= North–South Centre =

North-South Centre of the Council of Europe
- Alternative names: European Centre for Global Interdependence and Solidarity

General information
- Location: Lisbon, Portugal, Rua de São Caetano, 32
- Construction started: 1989
- Completed: 1990
- Inaugurated: 16 November

Website
- Official Site

The North–South Centre, officially the European Centre for Global Interdependence and Solidarity, is a Partial Agreement of the Council of Europe, the oldest political organisation of European states.

== History ==
It was the outcome of a process started in 1984, when the Portuguese Parliament hosted a conference held by the Council of Europe's Parliamentary Assembly on "North–South: Europe's role." The Lisbon Declaration, adopted at the end of the conference, broached the idea of a European public campaign on North–South interdependence and solidarity. The campaign was launched in 1988 with the support of the Parliamentary Assembly of the Council of Europe and the European Parliament. It ended with a European conference of parliamentarians and non-governmental organizations (Madrid, 1–3 June 1988), which launched the Madrid Appeal. The Madrid Appeal laid the foundations for a dynamic dialogue between North and South in a spirit of respect for democracy, and human dignity in order to allow all the world's inhabitants to enjoy fair, balanced and sustainable development. The Portuguese government then proposed setting up a European Centre for Global Interdependence and Solidarity, a proposal supported by the Council of Europe Parliamentary Assembly in a recommendation adopted in January 1989. The North–South Centre, was established in Lisbon in May 1990 with the purpose of promoting dialogue between North and South, fostering solidarity and raising awareness of global interdependence. The Centre fulfils a dual political role of representing "the voice of the South" within the Council of Europe and of promoting and transmitting the values of democracy and human rights that are central to the Council of Europe's mission in neighboring regions. The Centre strives to promote gender empowerment, youth participation and democratic consolidation through intercultural dialogue in cooperation with civil society, local authorities, governments and parliaments.

=== Key dates ===
- 29 May 2013: Adoption of the Report on the new Mission of the Centre in the framework of the Council of Europe neighborhood policy.
- 5 May 2011: Adoption of a new Statutory Resolution for the NSC which entered into force on 1 June 2011.
- 2010: Accession of Azerbaijan and Cape Verde, the second non-European country to become a member; Celebration of the 20th Anniversary of the North–South Centre.
- 2009: Accession of Morocco, first non-European country to become a member – the NSC has 21 member States and 1st African University on Youth and Development (Praia).
- 2007: 1st Africa-Europe Youth Summit.
- 2001: Accession of Germany – the NSC has 20 member States.
- 2000: Launching of the University on Youth and Development (Mollina).
- 1995: Launching of the North-South Prize of the Council of Europe (Lisbon).
- 1994: 1st meeting of the Lisbon Forum “Human Rights in North-South dialogue” Launching of the “Transmed Program” (Rome).
- 21 October 1993: Existence of the North–South Centre confirmed by Resolution (93)51 of the Committee of Ministers of the Council of Europe – the NSC has 15 member States.
- 1990: Set up of the North–South Centre in Lisbon.
- 16 November 1989: Adoption of the Resolution (89)14 adopted by the Committee of Ministers of the Council of Europe endorsing the creation of the North–South Centre following a proposition by the government of Portugal, with 10 founding countries.
- 1–3 June 1988: European public campaign on North-South interdependence and solidarity organized by the Council of Europe in cooperation with the European Community. It ended with a European conference of parliamentarians and non-governmental organizations (Madrid), which issued the Madrid Appeal.
- 9–11 April 1984: Conference organized in Lisbon held by the Parliamentary Assembly of the Council of Europe on the theme, “North-South: Europe’s role” and adoption of the “Lisbon Declaration”.

On 5 May 2011, the Committee of Ministers of the Council of Europe adopted a new statutory resolution for the North–South Centre. This step had positively concluded a process launched in November 2009 by the Parliamentary Assembly, in connection with the 20th Anniversary of the Centre. Through this decision, the member States - and all of the stakeholders of the North–South Centre - have confirmed its relevance and importance, at a time when the Arab countries are facing historical changes. The main lines of the Centre's new statute, which entered into force on 1 June 2011, are the following:
- the Centre has kept its present legal nature and continues to function as an enlarged partial agreement of the Council of Europe.
- an invitation is made to all member States of the Council of Europe as well as to the European Union to join the Centre as soon as possible.
- the Centre acts as an interface between the Council of Europe and countries in neighboring regions which are interested in cooperating with the Organization, by offering them a platform for structured cooperation at different levels (governments, parliamentarians, local and regional authorities, civil society).
- the two former statutory organs of the Centre merged into a new "Executive Committee", which is the single decision-making body of the North–South Centre through this important structural change, the "quadrilogue" functioning of the Centre has been preserved, while full participation of all member states in the decision-making process is ensured.
- the relationship with the European Union has been reinforced, through the introduction of the EU Committee of Regions as a new stakeholder of the North–South Centre.
- the priority areas of the Centre are confirmed (education, youth, intercultural dialogue), with an increased focus on the promotion of Council of Europe principles and values beyond the European continent.

== Mission ==
Building on the experience, knowledge and network of contacts established over the years, the Centre is an important asset of the Council of Europe and its role has been refocused to contribute to implementation of the Council of Europe's neighbourhood policy. The Centre's multilateral activities contribute to processes of democratic consolidation in member states and in neighboring regions, mainly through education to democratic citizenship and intercultural dialogue. The focus of many of these activities is on strengthening civil society, in particular with regard to youth and women.

The Centre works in close cooperation with the European Union in the framework of a Joint Management Agreement concluded between the NSC and the European Commission to raise awareness of global interdependence and solidarity through global/development education and youth cooperation in Europe and beyond. A key objective of the activities carried out under this agreement is to strengthen the role of youth and facilitate the development of policies and structures for youth participation, particularly in Europe and Africa.

== Structure ==
The European Centre for Global Interdependence and Solidarity, more commonly known as the North–South Centre, was established in November 1989 as an "Enlarged Partial Agreement" so that other states not members of the Council of Europe can also join. There are currently 17 member States, two of whom are not members of the Council of Europe.
Management of the North–South Centre is overseen by an Executive Committee that is composed of members representing each of the components of the "quadrilogue."
The "quadrilogue" is a unique North–South Centre concept coined to explain a partnership which brings together representatives of governments, national parliaments, local and regional authorities and civil society to ensure good governance of the Centre representative of all the relevant stakeholders.

=== The Executive Committee ===
The Executive Committee is the decision-making statutory organ of the Centre.
On 5 May, the Committee of Ministers of the Council of Europe adopted a new statutory resolution for the North–South Centre. One of the main lines of the Centre's new statute, which entered into force on 1 June 2011, concerns its statutory bodies. In fact, the two former statutory organs of the Centre merged into a new "Executive Committee".
The Executive Committee is the decision-making body of the Centre. The different components of the quadrilogue are represented as follows:
• A government representative for each member state of the Centre
• Four parliamentarians, 2 each from the Parliamentary Assembly of the Council of Europe and the European Parliament
• Four members representing organized civil society active in priority activity areas for the Centre and ready to engage in concrete cooperation
• A representative of the European Commission
• A representative of the Secretary General of the Council of Europe in an advisory

The Executive Committee meets twice a year, in principle in Lisbon and in Strasbourg. The current president of the Executive Council is Jean-Marie Heydt.

=== The Bureau ===
To facilitate efficient management, the Executive Committee shall elect a Bureau from among its members, ensuring representation of each of the 4 components of the quadrilogue.
The Bureau monitors the preparation and execution of programs and report to the Executive Committee. It also prepares the meetings of the Executive Committee, with the assistance of the Centre's Secretariat.
The Bureau shall also carry out any other task entrusted to it by the Executive Committee. The bureau meets twice a year, in principle in Lisbon and in Strasbourg.

=== Member states ===
Member states

- Algeria: June 22, 2017
- Andorra: April 15, 2013
- Azerbaijan: August 1, 2010
- Bosnia and Herzegovina: January 12, 2017
- Bulgaria: January 1, 2016
- Cape Verde: March 1, 2010
- Croatia: February 18, 2015
- Cyprus: November 16, 1989
- Greece: July 4, 1995
- (Vatican City) Holy See: June 4, 1998
- Liechtenstein: January 1, 1991
- Luxembourg: November 16, 1989
- Malta: November 16, 1989
- Montenegro: March 1, 2008
- Morocco: July 1, 2009
- Portugal: November 16, 1989
- Romania: September 7, 2016
- Serbia: March 1, 2009
- Spain: November 16, 1989
- Tunisia: December 16, 2016

Associate Member

- Lebanon: April 4, 2024

Former member states

- Finland
- France
- Germany
- Iceland
- (Republic of Ireland) Ireland
- Italy
- Netherlands
- Norway
- Slovenia
- Sweden
- Switzerland

Non-member States

- Armenia
- Austria
- Bulgaria
- Czech Republic
- Denmark
- Egypt
- Estonia
- (Georgia (country)) Georgia
- Hungary
- Jordan
- Lebanon
- Latvia
- Lithuania
- Moldova
- Monaco
- Poland
- Romania
- Russia
- Slovakia
- Switzerland
- Tunisia
- Turkey
- United Kingdom

== Programs ==
=== Youth Co-operation ===
The Objective of the Youth Co-operation Program of the Centre in terms of youth is to provide training and capacity building for young people and youth organizations as well as to facilitate their participation in decision and policy making, in the framework of quadrilogue initiatives. This work should be developed in close co-operation with youth organizations, the Youth Department of the Council of Europe, the EU-CoE youth partnership and other relevant institutions working in the youth field.
The Youth Co-operation Program is composed by 3 main dimensions:
1. A Euro-Arab and Mediterranean Dimension
2. The Network of Universities on Youth and Global Citizenship
3. The Africa-Europe Youth Co-operation activities in the framework of the “Joint Management Agreement” (JMA), signed with the European Commission in November 2008 and renewed until 2015.

=== Women ===
The Program "Women" aims to strengthen the role of women as developing actors in the southern and eastern Mediterranean region, and to enhance women's empowerment at all levels of governance in order to contribute to the ongoing democratic processes in this geographic area, with particular attention to Morocco and Tunisia.
The program is based on the following dimensions:
- Women's participation in politics
- Prevention of the violence against women and adoption of the CoE's Convention on preventing and combating violence against women and domestic violence (Istanbul Convention)
- Women and media
- Euro-Med Women Network
- Prevention of the human trafficking
The activities of the Women Program are implemented in the framework of the North-South Process for the Empowerment of Women (NSPEW) and its Euro-Med Women Network (EMWN).
North-South Process for the Empowerment of Women:
The North–South Centre acts as Secretariat and monitors the Euro-Med Women Network launched in 2012. The Euro-Med Women Network aims at contributing to the empowerment of women by providing its members with an online platform, supported by a website, which will facilitate the exchange of best practices, the identification of common challenges and the sharing of experiences as well as will contribute to the identification of projects and partnerships.

== Other Activities ==
As a partial agreement of the Council of Europe, the center shares the advantages of being institutionally an integral part of Europe's oldest political organizations of States. The Council of Europe is often defined as the "custodian" of Europe's political culture of pluralism, democracy and respect of human rights. The center is under the administrative responsibility of the Directorate of Democracy.

The North–South Centre's work is based on three principles: dialogue, partnership and solidarity. Governments, parliaments, local and regional authorities and civil society organizations constitute the partners in the quadrilogue and are involved in the center's activities. They are also represented in the center's statutory bodies. This approach helps to bring the different players in North–South cooperation closer, thereby creating constructive synergies.

The center carries out studies and organizes debates, workshops and training courses. It acts as a catalyst by facilitating meetings between players from different horizons and countries, working on issues of common interest and encouraging the formation of networks. Its expertise is used and recognized by its partners.

=== Global education activities ===
Strategies and Capacity Building for Global Education
The North–South Centre's objective as regards global education is to develop, enhance and sustain strategies and capacity-building for global education, targeting institutions and practitioners in the field of global education in the formal and non-formal sector.

Reinforcement of policies, partnerships and networking of key stakeholders in the field of global education
- Joint Management Agreement between the EC and the NSC
Objectives: elaborate on the prospects of developing a European framework for global/development education, facilitate and provide the space for dialogue and networking between international and European actors, in particular in the new EU member states, and to share experiences and identify common priorities.

Promotion of Global Education Practices
Objectives: promote and encourage global education practices through shared learning of global education fundamentals; support the successful implementation of global education program activities, in close collaboration with partners and stakeholders in Council of Europe members states and beyond (Southern countries and partners); achieve recognition of global education by policymakers in the member states of the Council of Europe.

Reinforcement of capacities
Objectives: offer guidelines and training courses for practitioners to understand and practice global education.
- Joint Management Agreement between the EC and the NSC
Objectives: elaborate on the prospects of developing a European framework for global/development education, facilitate and provide the space for dialogue and networking between international and European actors, in particular in the new EU member states, and to share experiences and identify common priorities.

Promotion of Global Education Practices
Objectives: promote and encourage global education practices through shared learning of global education fundamentals; support the successful implementation of global education program activities, in close collaboration with partners and stakeholders in Council of Europe members states and beyond (Southern countries and partners); achieve recognition of global education by policymakers in the member states of the Council of Europe.

Capacity building
Objectives: offer guidelines and training courses for practitioners to understand and practice global education.

=== Lisbon Forum ===
Organized annually since 1994 by the North - South Centre of the Council of Europe, the Lisbon Forum is a distinctive platform bringing together high - level participants from Europe, neighboring regions and other continents to share experience, good practice and expertise.

Themes of the Forum have been closely related to the core mission of the Council of Europe: to promote democracy, human rights and the rule of law.
In light of the events of the 'Arab Spring' and of the changes in the countries of the region, recent editions of the Forum have sought to address key challenges faced by Arab societies and explore possibilities for renewed cooperation with Europe.
The Lisbon Forum 2014, building on the conclusions of the previous editions, was devoted to 'Electoral processes and democratic consolidation in the countries of the Southern Mediterranean'.
It offered to the participants an opportunity to exchange on the main issues related to the electoral process as well as on the importance of democratic awareness of all actors involved.

=== North–South Prize ===
The North-South Prize has been awarded every year since 1995 to two candidates who have stood out for their exceptional commitment to promoting North-South solidarity.
The candidates, preferably a man and a woman, must have distinguished themselves in the following areas: protection of human rights, defense of pluralist democracy, public awareness raising on issues of global interdependence and solidarity, and strengthening the North-South partnership.

- 1995: (Cape Verde) Vera Duarte
- 1996: (France) Danielle Mitterrand
- 1997: (Republic of Ireland) Mary Robinson
- 1998: (Mozambique) Graça Machel
- 1999: (Italy) Emma Bonino
- 2000: (Burundi) Marguerite Barankitse
- 2001: (Brazil) Maria de Nazaré Gadelha Ferreira Fernandes
- 2002: (France) Albina du Boisrouvray
- 2003: (South Africa) Frene Ginwala
- 2004: (Egypt) Nawal El Saadawi
- 2005: (Ethiopia) Bogaletch Gebre
- 2006: (Pakistan) Mukhtaran Bibi
- 2007: (France) Simone Veil
- 2008: Rania of Jordan
- 2009: (Kuwait) Rola Dashti
- 2010: (Canada) Louise Arbour
- 2011: (Tunisia) Souhayr Belhassen
- 2012: (Switzerland) Monika Hauser
- 2013: (Lebanon) Suzanne Jabbour
- 2014: (Republic of Ireland) Maura Lynch
- 2015: (Mozambique) Joaquim Chissano
- 2016: (Tunisia) Mbarka Brahmi
- 2017: (Kenya) Abbas Gullet
- (United Kingdom) Peter Gabriel
- Women of Algeria (symbolic)
- (Chile) Patricio Aylwin
- (Canada) Lloyd Axworthy
- (Morocco) Abderrahmane Youssoufi
- (Portugal) Mário Soares
- (Switzerland) Cornelio Sommaruga
- (Timor-Leste) Xanana Gusmão
- (Portugal) António de Almeida Santos
- (France) Stéphane Hessel
- (Republic of Ireland) Bob Geldof
- (Netherlands) Frans van der Hoff
- (Ghana) Kofi Annan
- (Portugal) Jorge Sampaio
- (Russia) Mikhail Gorbachev
- (Brazil) Lula da Silva
- (Serbia) Boris Tadic
- (Pakistan) Asma Jahangir
- (United Kingdom) Aga Khan IV
- (Morocco) André Azoulay
- (Greece) Joaquim Chissano
- (Italy) Giuseppina Nicolini
- (Finland) Kristiina Kumpula

=== Joint management agreement ===
Global/development education aims at raising awareness and at strengthening citizens’ capacity to take action, advocate for their rights and take part in the political debate at local, national and international level for social justice and sustainable development.

== See also ==
- Council of Europe
- Council of Europe Development Bank
- European Audiovisual Observatory
- European Directorate for the Quality of Medicines and Health Care
