= North–South Prize =

Annual human rights award from the Council of Europe

The North–South Prize of the Council of Europe is awarded annually since 1995 by the North-South Centre of the Council of Europe to two public figures who are recognised for their deep commitment, outstanding achievements and hope they have generated in the field of protection of human rights, the defence of pluralist democracy and North-South partnership and solidarity.

== Call for candidates and selection ==
Anyone can submit a nomination. The "quadrilogue" (made up of governments, members of parliament, local and regional authorities, and non-governmental organisations from civil society) involved in overseeing the North-South Centre of the Council of Europe, along with media representatives and international and regional government organisations, are invited to name individuals or an organisation whose activities are considered worthy of distinction. The call for candidates is made on its website. The Centre's partners are similarly asked to inform their respective media organs. The file is sent for review to each member of the jury. After studying the files, the Jury makes a final decision on the candidates.

== Candidate selection criteria ==
The Prize is awarded every year to two nominees, selected from a combination of the categories Global, North and South, keeping, when possible, the gender and geographical balance.The Prize rewards their commitment to the defence and promotion of human rights, democracy and the rule of law as well as to the development of intercultural dialogue and the reinforcement of the North-South partnership and solidarity, in conformity with the principles and priorities of the Council of Europe.

== Jury ==
The Jury is presided by the Chair of the North-South Centre Executive Committee and is made up of members of the Bureau of the North-South Centre and a representative of the North-South Centre‘s host country, if the country’s representative is not a Bureau member.

== The winners ==
Year	Recipients	Country
1995	Peter Gabriel	United Kingdom
1995	Vera Duarte	Cape Verde
1996	Danielle Mitterrand	France
1996	Algerian women	Algeria
1997	Mary Robinson	Ireland
1997	Patricio Aylwin	Chile
1998	Graça Machel	Mozambique
1998	Lloyd Axworthy	Canada
1999	Emma Bonino	Italy
1999	Abderrahmane Youssoufi	Morocco
2000	Marguerite Barankitse	Burundi
2000	Mário Soares	Portugal
2001	Maria de Nazaré Gadelha Ferreira Fernandes	Brazil
2001	Cornelio Sommaruga	Switzerland
2002	Albina du Boisrouvray	France
2002	Xanana Gusmão	East Timor
2003	Frene Ginwala	South Africa
2003	António de Almeida Santos	Portugal
2004	Nawal El Saadawi	Egypt
2004	Stéphane Hessel	France
2005	Bogaletch Gebre	Ethiopia
2005	Bob Geldof	Ireland
2006	Mukhtaran Bibi	Pakistan
2006	Francisco Van Der Hoff	Netherlands
2007	Kofi Annan	Ghana
2007	Simone Veil	France
2008	Jorge Sampaio	Portugal
2008	Rania al-Abdullah	Jordan
2009	Mikhail Gorbachev	Russia
2009	Rola Dashti	Kuwait
2010	Louise Arbour	Canada
2010	Lula da Silva	Brazil
2011	Boris Tadić	Serbia
2011	Souhayr Belhassen	Tunisia
2012	Monika Hauser	Switzerland
2012	Asma Jahangir	Pakistan
2013	Aga Khan IV	United Kingdom
2013	Suzanne Jabbour	Lebanon
2014	Maura Lynch	Ireland
2014	André Azoulay	Morocco
2015	Lora Pappa	Greece
2015	Joaquim Alberto Chissano	Mozambique
2016	Giuseppina Nicolini	Italy
2016	Mbarka Brahmi	Tunisia
2017	Kristiina Kumpula	Finland
2017	Abbas Gullet	Kenya
2018	Jaha Mapenzi Dukureh	Gambia
2018	Damien Carême	France
2019	Nabila Hamza	Tunisia
2019	Leoluca Orlando	Italy
2020	Mediterranean Experts on Climate and Environmental Change (MedECC)	France
2020	International Commission against the Death Penalty (ICDP)	Spain
2021	Covax Mechanism	
2021	Zarifa Ghafari	Afghanistan
2022	Association of Ukrainian Cities (AUC)	Ukraine
2022	The Intergovernmental Panel on Climate Change (IPCC)	Switzerland
2023	Amina Bouayach	Morocco
2023	Global Campus of Human Rights	Italy
2024	Miguel Ángel Moratinos	Spain
2024	The initiative enabling refugees to compete in the Olympic and Paralympic Games (led by the International Olympic Committee, the Olympic Refuge Foundation, and the International Paralympic Committee)	
