= KMG Ethiopia =

Non-governmental charitable organization in Ethiopia

- Formation: Kembata, November 1997; 28 years ago
- Founder: Bogaletch Gebre & Fikirte Gebre
- Type: NGO
- Purpose: Social change
- Headquarters: Ethiopia
- Executive Director: Bogaletch Gebre
- Website: www.kmgusa.org

KMG Ethiopia, also known as Kembatti Mentti Gezzima-Tope (Kembatta Women Standing Together), is an indigenous non-governmental charitable organization based in Kembata, Ethiopia, dedicated to protecting women's rights, fostering women's health and supporting the environment. Founded in 1997 by sisters Bogaletch and Fikirte Gebre, the organization has expanded across the nation.

KMG Ethiopia works to foster change through social revolution and practical assistance, rather than through legislation. 2013's Making Citizens in Africa: Ethnicity, Gender, and National Identity in Ethiopia describes the work of KMG as "groundbreaking and culturally respectful", demonstrating "that reform for women and girls must be inclusive of women and men, it must include traditional power structures, and it will be most successful when it also integrates with anti-poverty and development initiatives." The organization has successfully deployed the "community conversations" technique pioneered by AIDS activist Moustapha Gueye to foster social change in a number of key areas related to the wellbeing of women and girls, including combating female genital mutilation and bridal abduction, and has assisted the Ethiopian government nationally with HIV prevention initiatives. It also works towards providing health care, including creating the Mother and Child Health Centre in Durame, and building schools. It has initiatives engineered at improving life through the environment by providing potable water, sustainable electricity and planting trees.

A 2007 article in The Lancet indicated that co-founder and executive director Bogaletch Gebre had "almost single-handedly eradicated the practice of female genital mutilation in Ethiopia".

== History ==
In November 1997, Ethiopian sisters Bogaletch and Fikirte Gebre came together to create Kembatti Mentti Gezzima-Tope with the goal of helping put an end to female genital mutilation (also commonly called female circumcision) and bridal abduction, the practice whereby women and girls are kidnapped and raped in order to force them into marriage. According to the National Committee on Traditional Practices of Ethiopia, such bridal abductions were the base of 69% of marriages in the country as of 2003. UNICEF's Innocenti Research Center estimates that in 1999 female genital mutilation had 100% social support in the region.

The sisters had been raised in a traditional Ethiopian home, themselves subjected to genital mutilation in their childhoods. Bogaletch Gebre had managed to obtain an education over her father's objections and relocated to the United States, where while earning her PhD in epidemiology she started a charity geared at sending technical books to high school and university students in her native land. In the mid-1990s she returned to Ethiopia with US$5,000, which she invested in local improvements to help win the confidence of the community. She supplemented this with a €500,000 grant from the European Commission, and KMG Ethiopia was born.

Originally operating in two kebele in Ethiopia, the organization began by surveying community members about practices and informing the community of the results, focusing education efforts on individuals who would then spread what they had learned to others. On request of the United Nations, they turned to hosting "community conversations" encouraging people in the region to talk about these subjects. These community conversations, a concept created by AIDS activist Moustapha Gueye, are based on traditional African conventions whereby communities come together for several hours on a regular basis to reach consensus on matters of communal concern. Hundreds of men and women were trained to serve as facilitators at the KMG community conversations, which initially focused on AIDS education. In 2004, due to its successful implementation of the community conversation strategy, KMG was chosen by the Ethiopian government to train people to lead conversations across the country as a key component of HIV prevention in Ethiopia.

Supported by KMG in speaking up, women at these community conversations in the Kembata region first began pressing for women's rights issues such as the right to sit in the presence of men, equal length of education for boys and girls, and a place for women as village elders in making decisions before moving on to female genital mutilation and kidnapping. A video screening of a female circumcision, a surgery locally known as "cutting off the dirt", had a particularly powerful impact. Both men and women in the community responded. Those who took part in conversations formed committees to work on ending the practice, including staging active interventions, with 2,000 trained facilitators across communities. Public celebrations of wholeness followed, with a rally on October 29, 2004 to celebrate intactness being attended by 100,000 people. According to the Innocenti Research Center, as of 2008 local support for female genital mutilation had dropped to 3%.

As of 2013, according to a New York Times profile, 85% of area residents were engaged in KMG's community conversations on multiple topics. Those who attend are encouraged to spread what they have learned to those who do not, with the intention of fostering social revolution on the individual level.

In addition to fostering conversation, KMG Ethiopia has taken an active role in pressing police to prosecute crimes such as bridal abduction. The practice has been illegal in Ethiopia since 2005, but in 2010 The Independent wrote that legal authorities outside the capital were loose in their application of law, with the first person to challenge her bridal abduction—a 13-year-old who could not prove she had been a virgin at the time of her kidnapping—being accused by her own defense attorney of inciting the rape. KMG has fostered support among women and men for victims, including persuading some to proactively intervene to prevent the act. According to The Independent, as of 2010 the rate of bridal abductions in the region had diminished by 90%.

KMG Ethiopia also offers other services, including health care and school construction, as well as creating sports programs and tournaments for girls. It works for maternal care and family planning, founding the Mother and Child Health Centre in Durame. Beyond directly supporting women's rights and health issues, it is also an environmental activism organization, planting over eight million trees and working to provide potable water and sustainable electricity.

To support its work, KMG collects an honorarium at community conversations and also raises money internationally, including from international charitable efforts like Comic Relief.

As of 2013, KMG's activities had spread from its initial two kebele to 26 districts in the Southern Nations, Nationalities, and Peoples' Region and the Oromia Region.

== Honors ==
Cofounder and executive director Bogaletch Gebre was awarded the 2005 North-South Prize and in 2007 the Jonathan Mann Award for Global Health and Human Rights. For her contributions to the development of Africa, Bogaletch Gebre was awarded the King Baudouin International Development Prize in May 2013, which she accepted on behalf of her colleagues at KMG Ethiopia.
