= European Alert System =

Earthquake warning system

The European Alert System (sometimes referred to as the European Alarm System or European Warning System) is an earthquake warning system for member states of the Council of Europe's EUR-OPA Major Hazards Agreement.

Seismic alerts are provided by the European-Mediterranean Seismological Centre (EMSC), an international, non-governmental, and non-profit association based at the Laboratoire de Détection et de Géophysique (LDG) of the French Atomic Energy Commission (Commissariat à l'Energie Atomique – CEA) in Bruyères-le-Châtel (Essonne, France). Until 1993, the EMSC was based in Strasbourg.

== Competence and notification ==
The EMSC's main area of competence is the following:

- west: to the Mid-Atlantic Ridge, north of 30°N
- north : to the Arctic Ocean
- east: to the Urals and the regions bordering the Caspian Sea and the Black Sea
- south : to the regions bordering the Mediterranean Sea.

The competent region also includes, as far as possible, territories of member states of the EUR-OPA Major Hazards Agreement which fall outside these boundaries.

The EMSC's Coordination Bureau is responsible for informing the Secretariat of the EUR-OPA Major Hazards Agreement about any major event in the European-Mediterranean region. It disseminates a notification to the Council of Europe less than an hour after an earthquake occurrence with a magnitude larger than 6.0 on the Richter scale in any of the states of the Partial Agreement, indicating the localization of the epicentre of the seism and its magnitude. The EUR-OPA secretariat undertakes to confirm the data with the affected state(s) and ask for their needs, which if necessary are communicated to other member states.

The Council of Europe does not provide humanitarian aid itself. This is provided by organisations such as the European Commission and UNOCHA.

== Past alerts ==
The alert was triggered for 19 events in 2006, notably the M_{w} 6.7 in Greece on 8 January 2006 and 18 events in the Extreme-Eastern Russia (10 events in the Kuril Islands, 5 in the Koryakia region (North of Kamchatka Peninsula) and 3 in or near the Kamchatka Peninsula).

== See also ==
- Earthquake early warning
- Earthquake prediction
- Emergency management
- EU-Alert
