= European-Mediterranean Seismological Centre =

- Abbreviation: EMSC / CSEM
- Formation: 1975
- Type: Not-for-profit NGO
- Location: Bruyères-le-Châtel, Essonne, France
- Region served: Île-de-France
- Services: Rapid Earthquake information
- Fields: Seismology
- Members: 85
- Employees: 10 (2016)
- Website: www.emsc-csem.org

The European-Mediterranean Seismological Centre (EMSC; French: Centre Sismologique Euro-Méditerranéen, CSEM) is an international, non-governmental and not-for-profit organisation.

The European-Mediterranean region is prone to destructive earthquakes. When an earthquake occurs, a scientific organisation is needed to determine, as quickly as possible, the characteristics of the seismic event. The European-Mediterranean Seismological Centre (EMSC) receives seismological data from more than 65 national seismological agencies, mostly in the Euro-Mediterranean region. The most relevant earthquake parameters, such as the earthquake location and the earthquake magnitude, and the shaking felt by the population are available within one hour from the earthquake onset.

== History ==
The European-Mediterranean Seismological Centre (EMSC) is a not-for-profit organisation with 84 member institutes from 55 different countries. The centre was established in 1975 under the request of the European Seismological Commission (ESC).

The EMSC became operational on 1 January 1975, at the Institut de Physique du Globe de Strasbourg. It received its final statute in 1983. In 1987, the EMSC was appointed by the Council of Europe as the main organisation to provide the European Alert System under the Open Partial Agreement (OPA) on Major Hazards.

In 1993, the EMSC statute and organisation were amended. Its headquarters moved to the Laboratoire de Détection et de Géophysique (LDG) within the Département Analyse, Surveillance, Environnement (DASE) of the French Atomic Energy Commission (CEA), in Bruyères-le-Châtel (Essonne, France).

As an international, non-governmental and non-profit organisation, the EMSC also focuses on promoting seismological research within and beyond its community. Hence, the EMSC is involved in many European (FP7 and H2020) projects:

FP7 projects:

- NERA
- VERCE
- MARsite
- REAKT

H2020 projects:

- EPOS-IP
- IMPROVER
- CARISMAND
- ENVRIplus
- ARISE2

Other projects:

- SIGMA
- RELEMR
- ARISTOTLE

== Objectives and activities ==
The main scientific objectives of the EMSC are:

- To establish and operate a system for rapid determination of the European and Mediterranean earthquake epicentres (location of major earthquakes within a delay of approximately one hour). EMSC, acting as the central authority, is responsible for transmitting these results immediately to the appropriate international authorities and to the members in order to meet the needs of protection of society, scientific progress and general information.
- To determine the main source parameters (epicentre coordinates, depth, magnitude, focal mechanisms, etc) of major seismic events located within the European-Mediterranean region, and to dispatch widely the corresponding results.
- To collect the data and make them available to other international, regional or national data centres such as the International Seismological Centre (ISC), the United States National Earthquake Information Center (NEIC), etc.
- To encourage scientific cooperation among European and Mediterranean countries in the field of earthquake research, and to develop studies of general interest such as: epicentre location methods, construction of local and regional travel-time tables, magnitude determination, etc.
- To promote seismological data exchange between laboratories in the European-Mediterranean area.
- To afford detailed studies of specific events.
- To build a European seismological data bank.
- To improve the observational systems in the European-Mediterranean region through a critical examination of the seismological coverage, and suggest methods in order to improve the quality of observations and their transmission to EMSC.

== Specific approaches ==
=== Flashsourcing ===
EMSC has developed a new approach based on internet traffic analysis: when an earthquake occurs, witnesses rush on the EMSC website to look for further explanation of the event. Therefore, they create a surge in the website traffic which can indicate that an earthquake just occurred, even before receiving data provided by national seismological institutes. By identifying the geographical origin of the website's visitors, the area where the earthquake was felt is mapped within a couple of minutes of its occurrence. This technique is named flashsourcing.

=== Citizen seismology ===
Citizens are a primary source of information in the real-time earthquake detections. EMSC involves them in earthquake response by collecting in-situ information (e.g., questionnaires, pictures, videos) on the earthquake impact directly from the earthquake eyewitnesses. Consequently, by involving the citizens in the response, the EMSC paves the way for an efficient strategy to raise seismic risk awareness.
