= Vera Duarte =

Cape Verdean poet, human rights activist, government minister and politician

- Born: Vera Valentina Benrós de Melo Duarte Lobo de Pina; October 2, 1952 (age 74); Mindelo, São Vicente, Cape Verde
- Occupations: poet, human rights activist, government minister, politician
- Awards: U Tam'si Prize for African Poetry

Vera Valentina Benrós de Melo Duarte Lobo de Pina (born October 2, 1952), also known as Vera Duarte Martins, is a Cape Verdean poet, human rights activist, government minister and politician.

== Biography ==
Duarte was born in Mindelo on the island of São Vicente. She spent her first years of school in Cape Verde. She studied abroad in Portugal at the University of Lisbon.

She returned to Praia in Cape Verde and became a counsellor judge at the Supreme Court. She later became an advisor to the President of the Republic.

Duarte was the recipient of the inaugural North–South Prize in 1995, along with musician, Peter Gabriel. The North–South Prize is awarded annually to recipients in the field of human rights by the North–South Centre of the Council of Europe. She is also a founding member of the Lisbon Forum.

Duarte is the only Capeverdean to have the U Tam'si Prize for African Poetry won in 2001.

Duarte co-founded and chaired the National Commission for Human Rights and Citizenship of Cape Verde in 2003. Most recently, Duarte has served as the Cape Verdean Minister of Education.

== Works ==
=== Poetry ===
- 1993 – Amanhã amadrugada
- 2001 – O arquipélago da paixão
- 2005 – Preces e súplicas ou os cânticos da desesperança
- 2010 – Exercícios poéticos
- 2018 - A reinvenção do mar

=== Novels ===
- 2003 – A candidata (The Candidate)
- 2017 - A matriarca – uma estória de mestiçagens (The Matriarch)
- 2021 - A Vénus Crioula (The Creole Venus)

=== Essays ===
- 2007 – Construindo a utopia (Constructing Utopias)
