= MJU =

MJU may refer to:

- Conference of Ministers of Justice
- Maejo University
- Minjiang University
- Myongji University
- Manna-Dora language, ISO 639-3 code mju
