= King Baudouin International Development Prize =

The King Baudouin Foundation is an independent and pluralistic foundation based in Brussels whose aim is to serve society. The Foundation was created in 1976, to mark the 25th anniversary of King Baudouin's reign. Its main objective is to make a lasting contribution to justice, democracy and respect for diversity.

The Foundation is associated with the "King Baudouin African Development Prize", worth 200,000 euros, awarded every other year by the Foundation's Board of Governors.

== Past winners ==
- 2018-19 - Wecyclers - Nigeria
- 2016-17 - BarefootLaw - Uganda, Farmerline - Ghana, Kytabu - Kenya
- 2014-15 - ADISCO - Burundi
- 2012-13 - Bogaletch Gebre - Ethiopia
- 2010-11 - Dr Denis Mukwege - Democratic Republic of Congo
- 2008-09 - KBR68H - Indonesia
- 2006-07 - Front Line - Ireland
- 2004-05 - Ousmane Sy - Mali
- 2002-03 - Fairtrade Labelling Organizations International (FLO, secretariat located in Bonn) - Germany
- 2000-01 - Fundecor (Fundación para el Desarrollo de la Cordillera Volcanica Central) - Costa Rica
- 1998-99 - The Human Rights Commission of Pakistan, Chaired by Mrs Asma Jahangir - Pakistan
- 1996-97 - Landless Peasants' Movement - Brazil
- 1992-93 - The Grameen Bank - Bangladesh
- 1990-91 - The Kagiso Trust - Peace Foundation - South Africa
- 1988-89 - The Indian Council of Agricultural Research - India
- 1986-87 - The International Foundation for Science - Sweden
- 1984-85 - Dr. Walter Plowright - UK
- 1982-83 - Dr. A.T. Ariyaratne - Sri Lanka
- 1980-81 - Paulo Freire - Brazil
- 1980-81 - The Consultative Group on International Agricultural Research - (CGIAR)
