= Council of Europe–European Union relations =

- European Union: Council of Europe

Council of Europe–European Union relations are the bilateral relations between the Council of Europe and the European Union. The Council of Europe and the European Union have shared relations since 1992. Almost 180 programmes have been implemented between the two European organisations in areas such as human rights, culture, democracy, and the rule of law. All 27 EU member states are members of the Council of Europe, which consists of 46 member states in total.

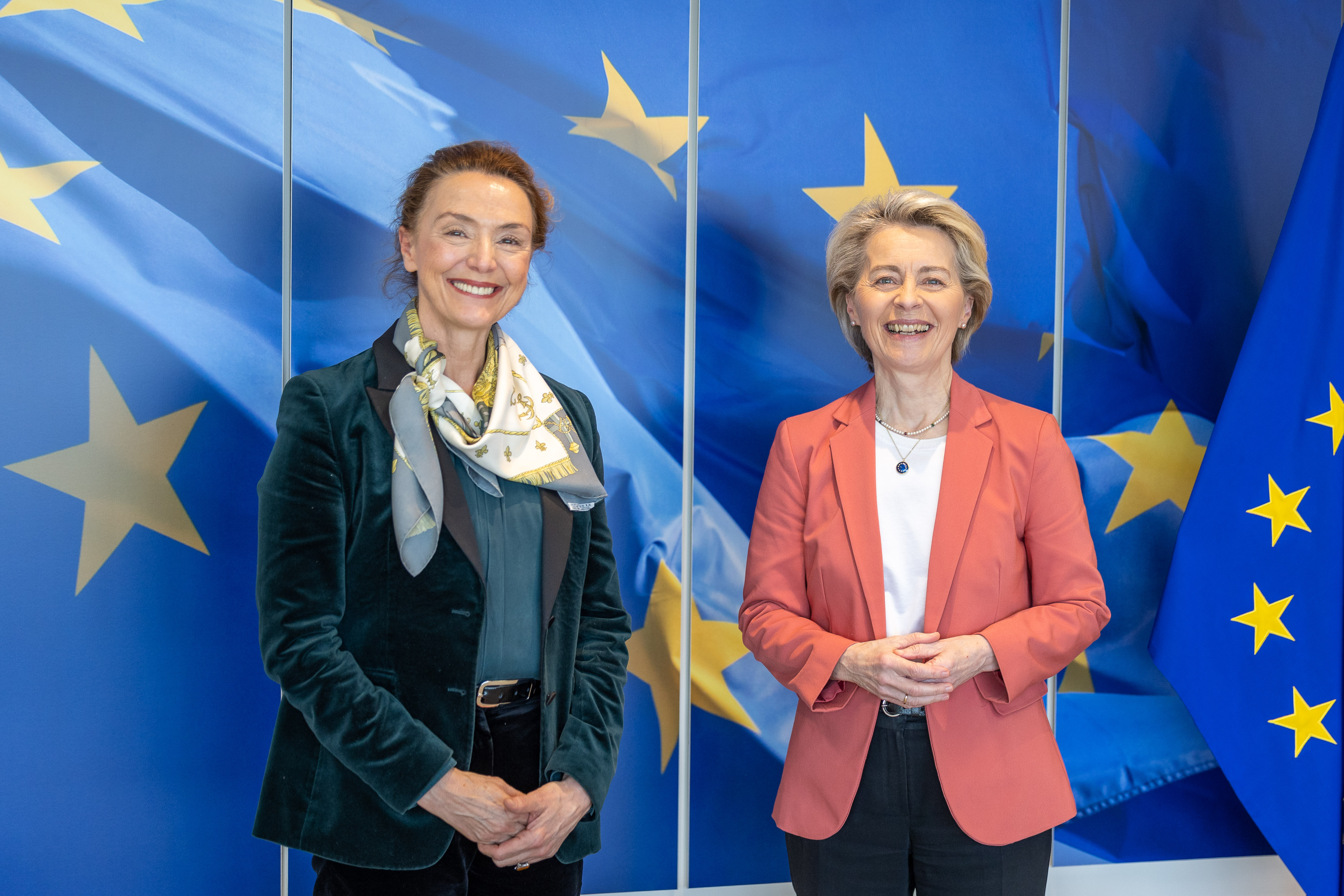
Secretary General of the Council of Europe Marija Pejčinović Burić with President of the European Commission Ursula von der Leyen in 1 March 2023

== Issues ==
=== Accession of the European Union to the Council of Europe ===
In May 2005, the Member states of the Council of Europe, meeting in Warsaw, expressed their wish to see the European Union join the Council of Europe and the European Convention on Human Rights. In practice, the Court of Justice of the European Union rulings have already been delivered in such a way as to be consistent with the rulings of the European Court of Human Rights. This accession is not intended to subordinate the European Union to the Council of Europe, nor even to amend the treaties. This would make it possible to subject to external control the respect for fundamental rights to which the Union's institutions are already subject.

The accession of the European Union was to be made possible by the ratification of Protocol 14 to the Convention for the Protection of Human Rights and Fundamental Freedoms. On 5 April 2013, the European Union and the Council of Europe finalised a draft agreement for the EU's accession to the European Convention on Human Rights. In order to be adopted, the draft agreement had to be submitted to the opinion of the EU Court of Justice, followed by unanimous support from the member states for accession, two-thirds support from the European Parliament and ratification by the national parliaments of the Council of Europe member states. However, on 18 December 2014, the Court of Justice delivered a negative opinion (No 2/2013) on the accession of the European Union to the ECHR due to legal incompatibilities. The process therefore came to a halt. After this stalemate, some Italian senators put forward a new proposal, based on a partial merger of the two courts.

Nevertheless, the European Union has since become a party to some Council of Europe treaties as an "international organisation", such as the Istanbul Convention (acceded on 13 June 2017, ratified on 28 June 2023, entered into force on 1 October 2023). It did so with a declaration explaining the legal competences of the Union on the one hand and the Member States on the other in relation to the Council of Europe and the Convention.

=== Confusion between the two organizations ===
The two institutions are often confused, which has led the Council of Europe to try to distinguish itself from the EU. Thus, the Council of Europe website includes a section entitled "Do not get confused" which summarises the various institutional points that need to be distinguished.

== See also ==
- Foreign relations of the European Union
