= EUR-OPA Major Hazards Agreement =

The EUR-OPA Major Hazards Agreement is a Partial Agreement of the Council of Europe, set up in 1987 by Resolution (87) 2 of the Committee of Ministers. Its full name is "Co-operation Group for the Prevention of, Protection Against, and Organisation of Relief in Major Natural and Technological Disasters (EUR-OPA)".

Its aims are to develop disaster prediction research, risk management, post-crisis analysis and rehabilitation.

The Agreement supports the development of specialised scientific and technical centres on both sides of the Mediterranean. Many of the research activities are organised through a network of these centres.

It also includes a European Alert System, which is an earthquake disaster alert and rapid response system, run by the Strasbourg secretariat in cooperation with the European-Mediterranean Seismological Centre.

== Members ==
The agreement is known as an "open" agreement, States do not have to be member States of the Council of Europe in order to join. As of September 2011, 23 Council of Europe member States and 3 Non-member States of the Council of Europe are party to the agreement. Several International organisations also participate.

Council of Europe member States party to the EUR-OPA treaty (as of September 2011) are Albania, Armenia, Azerbaijan, Belgium, Bulgaria, Croatia, Cyprus, France, Georgia, Greece, Luxembourg, North Macedonia, Malta, Moldova, Monaco, Portugal, Romania, Russia, San Marino, Serbia, Spain, Turkey and Ukraine. Council of Europe non-members party to EUR-OPA are Algeria, Lebanon and Morocco. Participating international organisations include the European Union, the World Health Organization, UNOCHA, UNESCO and the International Federation of Red Cross and Red Crescent Societies.

Armenia, Azerbaijan, Georgia and Monaco joined the Agreement before they joined the Council of Europe. Italy was a member of the Agreement from 1987 to 2002. Israel was also a member until 1996.

== Ministers and correspondents ==
The Agreement organises a ministerial session every two or three years, which sets the priorities for activities. The latest of these, the 11th session, took place on 31 October 2006 in Marrakesh on the theme "Protecting societies from disasters through preparedness and prevention: a political priority".

A network of permanent correspondents meets regularly between these sessions to coordinate the activities.

The Agreement functions with a small secretariat, based at the Council of Europe headquarters in Strasbourg in the Agora building.
