= Pompidou Group =

European drug policy cooperation platform

Council of Europe International Cooperation Group on Drugs and Addiction
- Nickname: Pompidou Group
- Formation: 1971; 55 years ago (foundation); 1979; 47 years ago (sui generis) 1980; 46 years ago (integration into CoE)
- Founder: George Pompidou
- Founded at: Paris, France
- Type: Governmental
- Headquarters: Strasbourg, France (Secretariat)
- Location: Europe
- Region served: Worldwide
- Members: 41 countries (2022)
- Chair of the Permanent Correspondents: João Goulão Castel-Branco
- Executive Secretary: Denis Huber
- Parent organization: Council of Europe
- Website: coe.int/en/web/pompidou

The Council of Europe International Cooperation Group on Drugs and Addiction, also known as Pompidou Group (French: Groupe Pompidou; and formerly Cooperation Group to Combat Drug Abuse and Illicit Trafficking in Drugs) is the co-operation platform of the Council of Europe on matters of drug policy currently composed of 42 countries. It was established as an ad'hoc inter-governmental platform in 1971 until its incorporation into the Council of Europe in 1980. Its headquarters are in Strasbourg, France.

== History ==
During the 1960s, the "French Connection", a large-scale drug smuggling scheme allowing the import of heroin into the United States via Turkey and France, raised international concerns. On 6 August 1971, former French President Georges Pompidou sent a letter to his counterparts of Germany, Belgium, Italy, Luxembourg, the Netherlands and the United Kingdom expressing his concerns and proposing a joint effort "to better understand and tackle the growing drug problems in Europe." It has been suggested the initiative was pressed by a letter addressed to Pompidou by U.S. President Rixhard Nixon in 1969.

The Group was officially launched at the first ministerial meeting held in Paris on 4 November 1971. According to its website:

"Until 1979, the group operated without a formal status supported by the countries holding its presidency: France from 1971 to 1977 and Sweden from 1977 to 1979. The group developed as a sui generis entity throughout the 1970s, and three other countries (Denmark, Ireland and Sweden) joined it during that decade."

After the death of Pompidou in 1974, the group started to informally adopt the name "Pompidou Group."

On 27 March 1980, the Committee of Ministers of the Council of Europe adopted Resolution (80)2, integrating the Pompidou Group into the institutional framework of the Council as an inter-governmental body, after which numerous countries joined it.

As the European integration process and expansion of Schengen Area took over many drug-related areas of competences of European countries, the Pompidou Group reoriented its action towards monitoring. It publishes on a number of topics such as review of seizures carried out at borders, guidelines for custom officers, drug markets, and epidemiology. Since 1989, the Group started working on human rights, health, prevention (including the role of police in drug use prevention), and more recently on harm reduction and HIV/AIDS. Since 2004, the Group now awards every two years a "European Drug Prevention Prize" to drug prevention projects involving young people. More recently, the group has started involving on topics such as addiction to the internet, trade in precursors, on-line drug sales, gender-related issues, prison policies, etc.

In 1999 and 2010, the group signed Memoranda of Understanding with the EU's European Monitoring Centre for Drugs and Drug Addiction.

On 16 June 2021, marking the fiftieth anniversary of the initiative, the Committee of Ministers of the Council of Europe adopted Resolution CM/Res(2021)4 making important changes to the status and mandate of the group. It also officially changed its name to "Council of Europe International Cooperation Group on Drugs and Addiction."

== Structure ==
The Presidency is the main political body of the Pompidou Group. It takes primary responsibility for supervising the work of the group. The Ministerial Conference elects the countries holding the Presidency and Vice-Presidency for a four years term.

The Ministerial Conference is the policy-making body and high-level political forum. It is composed of Ministers responsible for drug policies in their countries, who meet every four years. The Ministerial Conference establishes the Group's strategy and priorities.

The Permanent Correspondents is the main decision-making body. It is composed by officials representing their government in-between Ministerial Conferences. Permanent Correspondents meet twice a year.

== Membership ==
Although the group was launched among seven European countries, its membership has expanded in number and in nature along the years.

=== Member states ===
As of 2022, the Pompidou Group consists of 41 member states. As an "Enlarged Partial Agreement", membership of the Pompidou Group is also open to countries not members of the Council of Europe, including states outside Europe. Observer status is also possible for states. In addition, the US and the Holy See "at their request and after deliberation by the Permanent Correspondents, have been associated with the work of the Pompidou Group on an ad hoc technical basis."

Membership of the Pompidou Group
	Country	Period of membership
1	Belgium	1971–present
2	France	1971–present
/	Germany	1971–2011
3	Italy	1971–present
4	Luxembourg	1971–present
/	Netherlands	1971–2011
/	United Kingdom	1971–2011
/	Denmark	1973–2011
5	Ireland	1973–present
6	Sweden	1973–present
7	Turkey	1980–present
8	Greece	1981–present
9	Norway	1983–present
/	Spain	1984–2011
10	Portugal	1985–present
11	Switzerland	1985–present
12	Finland	1987–present
13	Austria	1988–present
14	Malta	1988–present
15	Cyprus	1989–present
16	Hungary	1990–present
17	Poland	1991–present
18	San Marino	1991–present
19	Slovakia	1993–present
20	Czech Republic	1993–present
21	Liechtenstein	1994–present
22	Slovenia	1994–present
23	Croatia	1997–present
24	Estonia	1998–present
/	Russia	1999–2022
25	Iceland	2000–present
26	Azerbaijan	2001–present
27	Lithuania	2001–present
28	Romania	2005–present
29	Bulgaria	2005–present
30	North Macedonia	2011–present
31	Serbia	2011–present
32	Morocco	2011–present
33	Moldova	2012–present
34	Montenegro	2012–present
35	Israel	2013–present
36	Bosnia and Herzegovina	2015–present
37	Monaco	2016–present
38	Mexico	2017–present
39	Armenia	2020–present
40	Georgia	2020–present
41	Ukraine	2022–present

=== Intergovernmental and non-governmental observers ===
Beyond countries' governments, as of 2022, the European Commission, the European Monitoring Centre for Drugs and Drug Addiction, the Conference of INGOs of the Council of Europe, the Inter-American Drug Abuse Control Commission (CICAD/OAS), the United Nations Office on Drugs and Crime (UNODC), and the World Health Organization enjoy observer status.

On its turn, the Pompidou Group enjoys observer or similar status in a number of EU and UN fora.

== Criticism ==
Some governments have criticized the overlap of discussions held at the Pompidou Group with those taking place in fora like the European Union (Horizontal Drugs Group) or the United Nations (Commission on Narcotic Drugs). Countries have also lamented the membership fees.

Civil society stakeholders have criticized the Pompidou Group for leaving little room for the direct participation and involvement of non-governmental organizations in its work and discussions.

In 2022, while announcing the withdrawal of his country from the Pompidou Group, Russian Deputy Foreign Minister Oleg Syromolotov nonetheless declared that "the expert dialogue with the EU on combatting drugs has until recently been one of the few that has not been subject to political conjuncture." The consensus of the Pompidou Group around stringent drug policies, compatible with the zero-tolerance approach of the Russian Federation on drugs, and in particular with strong positions opposing decriminalization and legalization of drugs, has long been criticized by observers. In 2021, the Executive Secretary of the Pompidou Group Denis Huber declared:

"The Pompidou Group, with the diversity of its members, has no official stance on the issue of decriminalisation, but it will continue to play its role of a platform of cooperation and dialogue for discussing both health and criminal related problems associated with drug use and abuse."
