= Walter Plowright =

English veterinary scientist

Walter Plowright (20 July 1923 in Holbeach, Lincolnshire – 19 February 2010 in London) was an English veterinary scientist who devoted his career to the eradication of the cattle plague rinderpest. Plowright received the 1999 World Food Prize for his development of tissue culture rinderpest vaccine (TCRV), the key element in the quest to eliminate rinderpest. Rinderpest became the first animal disease to be eliminated worldwide.

He was the second son of Jonathan and Mahala Plowright. He attended Moulton Grammar School which transferred to Spalding Grammar School in 1939. He graduated from the Royal Veterinary College in London in 1944 and was commissioned into the Royal Army Veterinary Corps.

As a young veterinary pathologist, Plowright carried out research in Kenya and Nigeria. The East African Veterinary Research Organization at Muguga in Kenya provided the base for Plowright and his colleagues to adopt the cell-culture techniques used to develop the polio vaccine to produce a live attenuated (non-pathogenic) virus for use as a rinderpest vaccine.

Plowright used a mono-layer of kidney cells to culture the virus until it became non-virulent and could be transmitted from one cattle to another, producing lifelong immunity against rinderpest. Unlike its predecessors, tissue culture rinderpest vaccine (TCRV) could be used safely in all types of cattle, it could be produced very economically and conferred lifelong immunity.

The research and application techniques that brought Plowright success in fighting rinderpest were later replicated by his colleagues to vaccinate against sheeppox and lumpy skin disease.

In 1964, Plowright returned to the United Kingdom to oversee animal disease research there until his 1983 retirement. He chaired the Royal Veterinary College's microbiology and parasitology department from 1971 to 1978. He was Head of Microbiology at the Institute for Animal Health in Compton, Berkshire from 1978 to 1983. In addition to rinderpest, Plowright also contributed to the study of such viral animal diseases as African swine fever, malignant catarrhal fever, poxviruses, and herpesviruses.

He was awarded a Fellowship of the Royal Society of London and received the Order of St Michael and St George. He also received the World Organisation for Animal Health's Gold Medal and the Animal Health Trust's Outstanding Scientific Achievement Award. He was awarded the King Baudouin International Development Prize 1984-1985 by the Belgian monarch.

== Honours and awards ==
- 1965 J.T. Edwards Memorial Medal, Royal College of Veterinary Surgeons
- 1972 R.B. Bennett Commonwealth Prize of the Royal Society of Arts, London
- 1974 Companion of the Order of St Michael and St George
- 1977 Fellow, Royal College of Veterinary Surgeons
- 1979 Bledisloe Veterinary award, Royal Agricultural Society of England
- 1981 Fellow of the Royal Society of London
- 1984 King Baudouin Prize for International Development
- 1984 Dalrymple-Champneys Award, British Veterinary Association
- 1987 Fellow, Royal Veterinary College
- 1988 Gold Medal, International Office of Epizootics, Paris
- 1991 Outstanding Scientific Achievement Award, Animal Health Trust
- 1994 Gold Medal, European Society for Veterinary Virology
- 1994 Theiler Memorial Trust Lecture and Award
- 1999 World Food Prize
