= Eurimages =

Funding body of the Council of Europe

Logo

Eurimages is a cultural support fund of the Council of Europe, established in 1989 (37 years ago). Eurimages promotes independent filmmaking by providing financial support to feature-length fiction, animation, and documentary films. In doing so, it encourages co-operation between professionals across Europe. Eurimages is headquartered in Strasbourg, France in the Agora building of the Council of Europe. The current Chairperson is Catherine Trautmann.

== Purpose ==
The fund was created in 1988 within the framework of the Council of Europe, as a Partial Agreement, under Committee of Ministers Resolution (88) 15, with an independent budget of 21M €. It includes 38 of the 46 member states of the Council of Europe, plus Argentina and Canada as associate members.

Eurimages aims to promote the European film industry by encouraging the production and distribution of films and fostering co-operation between professionals. Eurimages has a clear cultural aim and is complementary to the Media programme of the European Union, which has an industrial goal. Eurimages has four support schemes: feature film co-production, the promotion of co-production, theatrical distribution (to be suspended as from the 2020 cycle in its current form) and exhibition. Eurimages promotes independent filmmaking through a number of collaboration agreements with various festivals and film markets and has also adopted a strategy to promote gender equality in the film industry.

Awards presented by Eurimages include the Eurimages Audentia Award, an annual award presented at a different partner film festival each year to honour the best film by an emerging woman filmmaker in that festival's program.

=== Member states ===
Member states include:

- Albania
- Armenia
- Austria
- Belgium
- Bosnia and Herzegovina
- Bulgaria
- Croatia
- Cyprus
- Czech Republic
- Denmark
- Estonia
- Finland
- France
- (Georgia (country)) Georgia
- Germany
- Greece
- Hungary
- Iceland
- Italy
- Latvia
- Lithuania
- Luxembourg
- Montenegro
- Netherlands
- North Macedonia
- Norway
- Poland
- Portugal
- Republic of Ireland
- Romania
- Serbia
- Slovakia
- Slovenia
- Spain
- Sweden
- Switzerland
- Turkey
- Ukraine

Associate members include:

- Argentina
- Canada

On 26 February 2022, in the wake of the 2022 Russian invasion of Ukraine, the Ukrainian Film Academy demanded that Russia, which joined Eurimages in 2011, be removed from the fund.

== Eligibility ==
The fund supports feature-length fiction, animation and documentary films of a minimum length of 70 minutes, intended for cinema release. A main condition of obtaining Eurimages support is that the project is an international co-production between at least two independent producers, established in different member states of the Fund, of which at least one is a member state of the Council of Europe. Co-producers from non-member states of the Fund may participate in the project provided that their combined co-production percentage does not exceed 30% of the total co-production budget. Other conditions of eligibility for projects applying for Eurimages support are:

- Every co-producer has to have at least 50% of financing in place, at the moment of the application
- The project has to have the support of either a film fund, a distributor or a television presale (Eurimages cannot be the first fund which supports the project)
- Deferrals and in-kind contribution shall be accepted as confirmed sources of financing only up to a maximum of 15% of the total co-production budget
- The principal photography should not have been started before the meeting of the Eurimages Board of Management. However and for duly justified reason, shooting/animation has already started, the project is still considered eligible if no more than half of the total shooting/animation (80% for documentaries) has taken place before the examination of the application by the Board of Management.

In order to receive Eurimages support, projects must comply with the legislation if the countries concerned, the bilateral treaties in force between the co-producing countries or, where applicable, with the European Convention on Cinematographic Coproduction or Council of Europe Convention on Cinematographic Co-production (revised). Eurimages provides a conditionally reimbursable interest-free loan. Financial support shall not exceed 17% (25% for documentaries) of the total production cost of the film and shall in no event be superior to €500,000. The loan is reimbursed from the first € of each co-producer’s net receipts - at the rate of the percentage of Eurimages support.

== See also ==
- Cinema of Europe
