= Committee of Experts on Terrorism =

Inter-governmental panel

The Committee of Experts on Terrorism, or CODEXTER, is an inter-governmental committee of experts of the Council of Europe.

It was founded in 2003 to replace the Multidisciplinary Group on International Action Against Terrorism. In 2018 CODEXTER became the Council of Europe Counter-Terrorism Committee.

One of the principal functions of the organisation is to make profiles of each member's legislative and institutional counter-terrorism plans. These profiles are short reports on member states' counter-terrorism measures.

== Criticism ==
Amnesty International has urged CODEXTER to delete the last paragraph of the organisation's Preamble, which attempts to define terrorism, as it "does not sufficiently distinguish between unlawful acts and legitimate, non-violent opposition to the actions or non-action of states"
