= Conference of Ministers of Justice =

The Council of Europe have been organising Conferences of Ministers of Justice (MJU) on a regular basis since 1961. They constitute an important forum of exchange and coordination of legal policy at the pan-European level. They are one of the best known of the Council of Europe's Conferences of Specialised Ministers.

Preparation of these conferences is the joint responsibility of the European Committee on legal co-operation (CDCJ) and the European Committee on Crime Problems (CDPC)

The Ministers of Justice usually meet each year. On a year when there is not a formal (numbered) conference, an informal ministerial conference is usually organised. Each conference is devoted to one or more themes.

== Past conferences and themes ==
1st conference, Paris (France), 1961

Draft convention on road traffic offences

Draft recommendation on rights of prisoners

Juvenile delinquency

Council of Europe activities in the field of criminological research

2nd conference, Rome (Italy), 1962

Draft convention on supervision on conditionally released offenders

Exchange of information on bills relating to penal and prison matters

Juvenile delinquency

Harmonisation of penal provisions of concern of the Rome treaty

Studies on the international validity of penal sentences

European Convention on Human Rights

Draft uniform law on arbitration

3rd conference, Dublin (Ireland), 1964

Measures to promote the comparative study of laws

Information on foreign law

The uniform interpretation of European treaties

State immunity

After care for conditionally sentenced or conditionally released offenders

4th conference, Berlin (Germany), 1966

Law reform

Exchange of young lawyers

Prevention of new divergencies between the laws of member States

Standardisation of judicial documents

Short term treatment of offenders

Improving the efficacy of legal instruments for crime control at international level

5th conference, London (United Kingdom), 1968

6th conference, The Hague (Netherlands), 1970

7th conference, Basel (Switzerland), 1972

8th conference, Lidingö, (Sweden), 1973

9th conference, Vienna (Austria), 1974

1975, informal conference, Obernai (France)

10th conference, Brussels (Belgium), 1976

Current and future developments in family law

Alternative measures to imprisonment

Mass media legislation in member States

Measures to combat new forms of concerted acts of violence

11th conference, Copenhagen (Denmark), 1978

Problems posed by prisoners of foreign nationality

Access to justice

How can modern administration meet the needs of the citizen

The death penalty

Forfeiture of rights in penal law

1979, informal conference, Aix-la-Chapelle (France)

12th conference, Luxembourg, 1980

1981, informal conference, Montreux (Switzerland)

13th conference, Athens (Greece), 1982

1983, informal conference Rome (Italy)

14th conference, Madrid (Spain), 1984

1985, informal conference, Edinburgh (United Kingdom)

15th Conference : Oslo (Norway), 1986

1987, informal conference, Helsinki (Finland)

16th Conference : Lisbon (Portugal), 1988

Criminal law and criminological questions raised by the propagation of infectious diseases, including AIDS

The supremacy of the interests of the child in the field of private law

Sexual exploitation, pornography and prostitution of and trafficking in children and young women

Elaboration of a draft convention on interstate cooperation in the penal field

Improving the implementation of Council of Europe conventions in the field of private law

1989, informal conference, The Hague (Netherlands)

Legal problems in connection with modern payment systems

17th conference : Istanbul (Turkey), 1990

Protection of the environment through criminal law

The legal heritage of the Council of Europe : its role in reinforcing links with the countries of Eastern Europe

1991, informal conference, Ottawa (Canada)

Sentencing

18th Conference : Nicosia (Cyprus), 1992

Rule of law

Criminal aspects of the market economy

The draft Convention on civil liability for damage resulting from activities dangerous to the environment

1993, informal conference, Lugano (Switzerland)

Protection of minorities

19th Conference, 14–15 June 1994, Valletta (Malta)

Corruption

1995, informal conference, Bucharest (Romania)

20th Conference, 11–12 June 1996, Budapest (Hungary)

Efficiency and fairness of civil, criminal and administrative justice

21st Conference, 10–11 June 1997, Prague (Czech Republic)

22nd Conference, 17–18 June 1999, Chişinău (Moldova)

23rd Conference, 8–9 June 2000, London (United Kingdom)

24th Conference, 4–5 October 2001, Moscow (Russian Federation)

25th Conference, 9–10 October 2003, Sofia (Bulgaria)

26th Conference, 7–8 April 2005, Helsinki (Finland)

27th Conference, 12–13 October 2006, Yerevan (Armenia)

Victims: place, rights and assistance

28th Conference, 25–26 October 2007, Lanzarote (Spain)

Emerging issues of access to justice for vulnerable groups, in particular:

- migrants and asylum seekers;

- and children, including children as perpetrators of crime"

29th Conference, 17–19 June 2009, Tromsø (Norway)

Breaking the silence – united against domestic violence

30th Conference, 24–26 November 2010, Istanbul (Turkey)

- Resolution no.1 on a modern, transparent and efficient justice

== Documentation ==
The report for 1 was published as CEPC(61)16.

The report for 2 was published without reference.

Reports for 3 to 11 and the Obernai conference were published in the "CMJ" series of documents.

Reports from the 12 onwards and reports for informal conferences since 1981 have been published in the "MJU" series of documents.

No report was published for the 1979 conference.

The report of the 19th conference has also been published as a paying publication.
