= Conference of Specialised Ministers =

The organisation of a Conference of Specialised Ministers is a traditional working method of the Council of Europe.

The purpose of such conferences is to define and pursue the goals of the Council of Europe’s intergovernmental activities in their particular fields of competence. These conferences have a quasi-legal identity of their own in international relations. The practice began in Vienna in 1959 with the first Conference of Ministers responsible for Family Affairs. However, the working methods for such conferences were only formalised in 1971 with the adoption of Committee of Ministers Resolution (71) 44., which gives a list of conferences with which the Council of Europe "has a special working relationship".

In February 2008, in the interests of transparency and visibility, the Committee of Ministers decided that all of its ministerial conferences would henceforth include "Council of Europe" in the title.

Several attempts to update this text finally came to fruition in June 2011 with the adoption of Resolution CM/Res(2011)7.

Several of the Conferences are prepared by a special committee of senior officials, which meets solely for that purpose. Others are prepared by the respective Council of Europe steering committee. The Committee of Ministers issues a regular information document "Forthcoming Conferences of Specialised Ministers", which gives the current state of preparation of these conferences.

The Conferences traditionally use a 3-letter abbreviation by which they and their relevant reports and resolutions are readily identified. Although a few of these have changed over the years, most of them have remained remarkably consistent.

The Committee of Ministers currently lists 14 conferences as operational:

- Council of Europe Conference of Ministers responsible for Migration Affairs (MMG)
- Council of Europe Conference of Ministers responsible for Integration Policies for People with disabilities (IPH)
- Council of Europe Conference of Health Ministers (MSN)
- Council of Europe Conference of Ministers of Justice (MJU)
- Council of Europe Conference of Ministers responsible for Spatial/Regional Planning (CEMAT)
- Council of Europe Conference of Ministers responsible for Cultural Affairs (CMC)
- Council of Europe Standing Conference of Ministers of Education (MED)
- Council of Europe Conference of Ministers responsible for Sport (MSL)
- Council of Europe Conference of Ministers responsible for Local and Regional Government (MCL)
- Council of Europe Ministerial Conference on the Media and New Communication Services (MCM)
- Council of Europe Conference of Ministers responsible for Youth (MJN)
- Council of Europe Conference of Ministers responsible for Family Affairs (MMF)
- Council of Europe Ministerial Conference on Equality between Women and Men (MEG)
- Council of Europe Conference of Ministers responsible for Social Cohesion

The last of these, the Conference on Social Cohesion, is new, and met for the first time in Moscow in February 2009. There have been a number of other conferences in the past, which are now discontinued. Many of the conferences have undergone several name changes, which make them difficult to trace. They should be distinguished from European Union ministerial conferences. The European Union occasionally convenes ministers in certain sectors (such as culture). Such meetings are often described as informal.

Some of the more successful conferences (e.g. Ministers of Justice) have become virtual institutions in themselves. The Committee of Ministers approves the theme and the organisations and non-member states to be invited.

Each conference makes a report to the Committee of Ministers after the conference, which also examines the possible follow-up to the conference. Several conferences of specialised ministers have only been held once, with no plans for them to meet again, notably :

- Human rights (1985)
- Research (1986)
- Terrorism (1986)
- Movement of persons (1991)

Four other ministerial conferences have been discontinued :

- Ministers of Cultural heritage (MPC), which last met in 1985 (2nd conference ), 1992 (3rd conference), 1996 (4th conference) and 2001 (5th conference)
- Ministers of Environment (MEN), which last met in 1987 (5th conference) and 1990 (6th conference)
- Ministers of Labour (MTV), which last met in 1986 (3rd conference), 1989 (4th conference) and 1993 (5th conference)
- Ministers of Social security (MSS), which last met in 1989 (4th conference), 1992 (5th conference), 1995 (6th conference), 1998 (7th conference) and 2002 (8th conference)
