= CAHDI =

Committee of the Council of Europe

CAHDI, formally the Committee of Legal Advisers on Public International Law, is a committee of the Council of Europe.

It is an intergovernmental committee bringing together the legal advisers of the 47 member states of the council as well as those of observer states and organisations.

CAHDI meets twice a year.

The committee has examined a number of issues, including state succession and questions of recognition, state immunity and developments regarding the international criminal tribunals and the International Criminal Court.

== History ==
The Committee met for the first time on 8 and 9 April 1991. It is the successor to the Council of Europe's Committee of Experts on International Law.

== Stated aims ==
- Develop the role of public international law and bring national viewpoints closer together
- Share experience and practice through exchanges of views on topical issues
- Create a framework for international co-operation, and so strengthen the role and influence the development of public international law by bringing legal advisers together to pool their experience
- Monitor the work done by other international bodies in its areas of competence, and help member states to adopt common standpoints.

== Relevant texts ==
There are multiple texts which are relevant for the work of CAHDI, including European treaties, for instance the European Convention for the Peaceful Settlement of Disputes, the European Convention on Consular Functions, the Protocol concerning the Protection of Refugees, the Protocol relating to Consular Functions in respect of Civil Aircraft, the European Convention on the Abolition of Legalisation of Documents executed by Diplomatic Agents or Consular Officers, the European Convention on State Immunity and its Additional Protocol and Resolutions and Recommendations of the Committee of Ministers of the Council of Europe, like Resolution (64) 10 concerning the publication of digests of State practice in the field of public international law or Resolution (68) 17 concerning a model plan for the classification of documents concerning State practice in the field of public international law.
