= Maura Lynch =

Irish Doctor and Catholic Nun

Sr. Dr. Maura Lynch

Personal life
- Born: 10 September 1938 Youghal, County Cork, Ireland
- Died: 9 December 2017 (aged 79) Kampala, Uganda
- Education: University College Dublin
- Known for: Fistulae, prevention and treatment.
- Occupation: Doctor, nun

Religious life
- Religion: Roman Catholic
- Order: Medical Missionaries of Mary

Sr. Dr. Maura Lynch (10 September 1938 – 9 December 2017) was an Irish doctor, a nun, and proponent of women's health.

== Early life and education ==
Lynch was born in Youghal, County Cork, Ireland to Patrick and Jane Lynch on 10 September 1938. She was one of nine children, three girls and six boys. Her father worked for the Post Office and moved the family with him around the country. Her mother was a teacher. The family spoke Irish at home. Lynch entered the convent of the Medical Missionaries of Mary (MMM) just before her 18th birthday in Clonmel, County Tipperary in 1956. She completed her education in the medical school at University College, Dublin to become a doctor. Lynch graduated in the top three of her class. She went on to get a Diploma in Obstetrics and Gynaecology at the Royal College of Obstetricians and Gynaecologists in London in 1966. Once her training was complete she was sent to Angola in 1967 after a period in Lisbon, Portugal, to learn Portuguese. She studied in the Lisbon School of Tropical Medicine where she gained her Diploma in Tropical Medicine and Public Health.

== Career ==
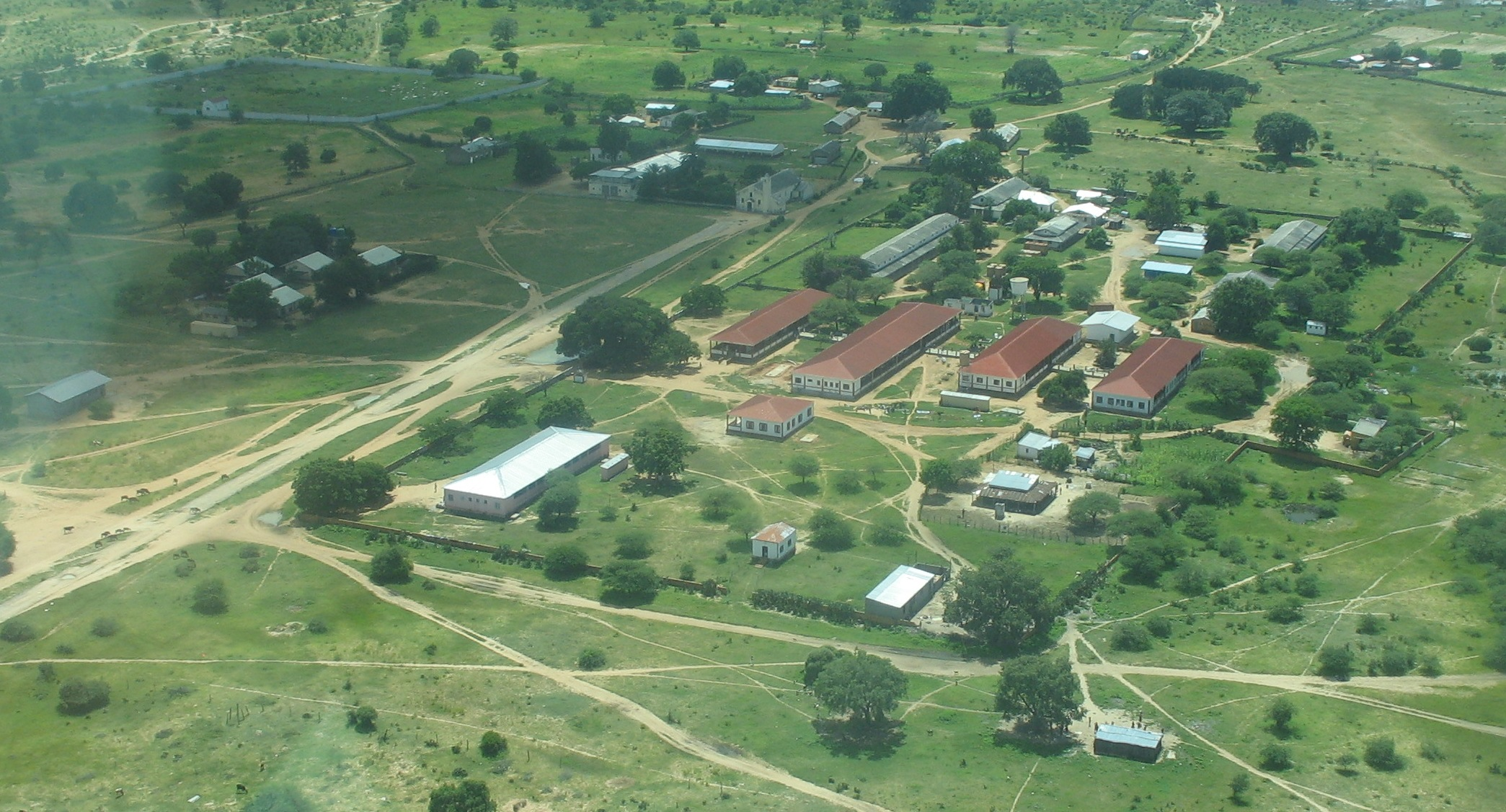
The hospital at Chiolo/TChiolo

In Angola, then known as Portuguese West Africa, Lynch worked as the medical director of the hospital at Chiulo. Lynch remained in the country during the Angolan War of Independence and the 1975 Angolan Civil War. The hospital became a focal point for war wounded.

Lynch completed her fellowship in surgery in 1985 and was then sent to Kitovu, Uganda in 1987 via Anua, Nigeria. In Nigeria Lynch learned about the repair of obstetrical fistulae which became a major focus of her work. She set up a medical centre in Kitovu Hospital for women affected by fistula and trained medical personnel on how to prevent and treat fistulae. The programme created by Lynch has received international recognition and awards. She was a founding member of the Association of Surgeons in Uganda. The government of Uganda granted her a Certificate of Residency for life. UCD awarded her an Honorary Fellowship of the School of Medicine in 2007. In 2013 she was given an honorary Fellowship in Obstetrics and Gynaecology from London College of Obstetric & Gynaecology and In 2015 she was awarded the Council of Europe's North-South Prize.

A fall in her eightieth year ended Lynch's tenure in Kitovu. She had surgery and moved to another local convent to recover. However less than a month later on the planned date of her golden jubilee celebration of her life in Africa, 9 December, she died in Kampala Hospital and was buried in Masaka, Uganda. She is remembered as a mentor, a feminist, and an advocate for women's rights. She is commemorated on the Women on Walls at Royal College of Surgeons in Ireland.
