= Bogaletch Gebre =

Ethiopian scientist and activist (died 2019)

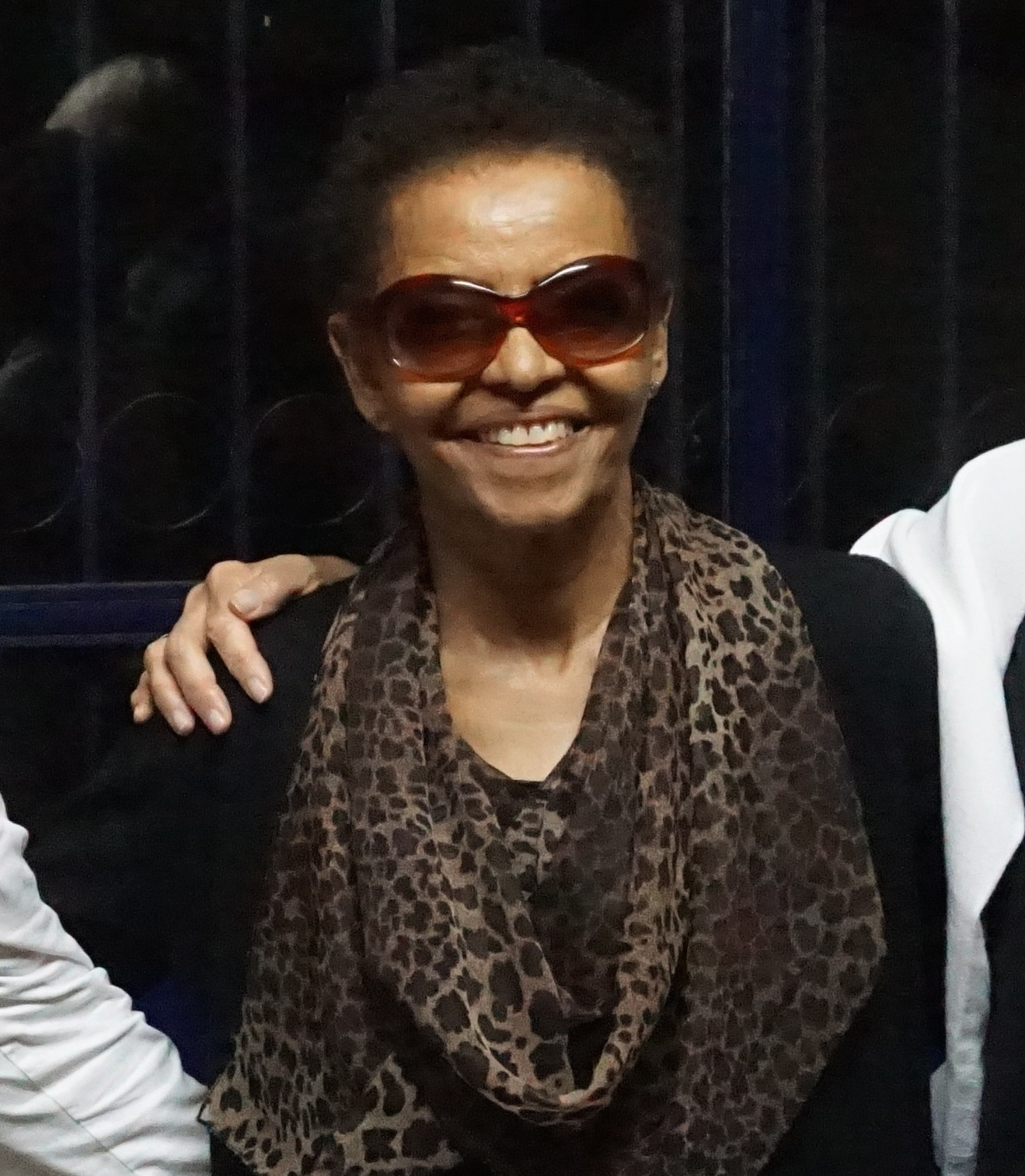
- Born: 1950
- Died: 2 November 2019 (aged 68–69)
- Citizenship: Ethiopia
- Education: University of Massachusetts Amherst
- Occupations: scientist, activist

Bogaletch "Boge" (pronounced Bo-gay) Gebre (1950s – 2 November 2019) was an Ethiopian scientist and activist. In 2010, The Independent characterized her as "the woman who began the rebellion of Ethiopian women." Along with her sister Fikirte Gebre, Gebre founded KMG Ethiopia, formerly called Kembatti Mentti Gezzima-Tope (Kembatta Women Standing Together). The charity works to serve women in many areas, including preventing female genital mutilation and bridal abductions, the practice of kidnapping and raping young women to force them into marriage. According to the National Committee on Traditional Practices of Ethiopia, such practices were the basis of 69% of marriages in the country as of 2003.

The Independent reports that the organization has reduced the rate of bridal abductions in Kembatta by over 90%, while The Economist notes it has been credited with reducing female genital mutilation from 100% to 3%. In 2005, Gebre was awarded the 2005 North-South Prize and in 2007 the Jonathan Mann Award for Global Health and Human Rights. For her contributions to the development of Africa, Boge was awarded the King Baudouin International Development Prize in May 2013.

== Background ==
Herself a victim of female genital mutilation at the age of 12, Gebre was forbidden a formal education by her father but sneaked out of her home to attend a missionary school. Ultimately, she studied microbiology in Jerusalem before attending the University of Massachusetts Amherst on a Fulbright scholarship. While in the United States, she launched her first charitable organization, Development through Education, through which students in Ethiopian high schools and universities received $26,000 worth of technical books.

After earning her PhD in epidemiology, Gebre returned to Ethiopia to help protect the rights of women in the 1990s. Following an initial public speech on the taboo topic of HIV/AIDS, Gebre realized that she would need to establish credibility with the community before she could effect change and so set herself to correcting problems that were pointed out to her, providing necessary supplies to build a bridge that would allow regional children to reach the nearest school and traders to reach the local market. Once the bridge was built, she and her sister formed KGM Ethiopia, opening community consultations village by village to protect the rights of women.

== See also ==
- Women in Ethiopia
