= Partial agreement =

Consensus among some Council of Europe members

Partial agreement is a term used within the Council of Europe to refer to a major activity of European cooperation that is organised by the Council of Europe but does not include all of its member states. This form of activity dates from a resolution adopted by the Council of Europe's Committee of Ministers on 2 August 1951. The resolution allowed for the adoption of agreements by a limited number of member states, without the participation of the remainder. Any expenditure would be made by the participating states alone. This form of variable geometry in intergovernmental cooperation has not been imitated by other international organisations. This form of cooperation also allows some activities to include non-European states as full-fledged participants.

In 1993 the ground-rules were revised by the Committee of Ministers to take into account new developments. Statutory Resolution (93) 28 of the Committee of Ministers replaced the 1951 resolution. It defines three types of agreement:

- A partial agreement: some member states of the Council of Europe;
- An enlarged partial agreement: some member states with one or more non-member states;
- An enlarged agreement: all member states with one or more non-member states.

The Council of Europe currently lists its partial agreements as the following:

Agreement name	Founded	Official name	Website
Council of Europe Development Bank	1956	—N/a	
European Centre for Modern Languages	1994	—N/a	Official website
Enlarged Partial Agreement on Cultural Routes	2010	—N/a	Official website
Enlarged Partial Agreement on the Observatory on History Teaching in Europe	2020	—N/a	
Enlarged Partial Agreement on Sport	2007	—N/a	
EUR-OPA Major Hazards Agreement	1987	EUR-OPA - The European and Mediterranean Major Hazards Agreement	
European Audiovisual Observatory	1992	—N/a	
European Directorate for the Quality of Medicines & HealthCare	1964	—N/a	Official website
Eurimages	1988	The European Support Fund for the co-production and distribution of films	Official website
GRECO	1998	Group of States Against Corruption	
Pompidou Group	1980	Cooperation Group to Combat Drug Abuse and Illicit Trafficking in Drugs	
North-South Centre	1989	European Centre for Global Interdependence and Solidarity	
Register of Damage for Ukraine, or RD4U	2022	Register of Damage Caused by the Aggression of the Russian Federation against Ukraine	Official website
Venice Commission	1990	European Commission for Democracy through Law	Official website
Youth Card	1991	Partial agreement on Youth mobility through the Youth Card	

Partial agreements are traditionally set up with a resolution of the Committee of Ministers. The European Directorate for the Quality of Medicines, which is usually listed as a Partial Agreement, falls outside of this definition, being the result of a treaty, and is thus technically a treaty body, such as the European Social Charter organs.

The European Card for Substantially Handicapped Persons, dating from 1977, never attracted sufficient interest from member states and so was never implemented.

Each agreement has its own form of supervision and management. A number of the agreements are supervised by the Committee of Ministers, others have their own executive boards.

In 2007, the activities of the public health partial agreement were transferred to the European Directorate for the Quality of Medicines, despite the fact that the member states were not the same.

The agreement on sport heralded a new development, dealing with an activity that had always been a mainstream intergovernmental activity but was relegated to a partial agreement to avoid it being axed altogether.

The Venice Commission is unique as being the one agreement which began life as a partial agreement and, because of its success, had to drop the qualifier 'Partial', when the last remaining member state joined.

The Council of Europe treaty office issues regularly updated information on all partial and enlarged agreements, listing all member states, observers, dates of accession and reference texts.
