= Ousmane Sy =

Malian politician

Ousmane Sy (born May 25, 1949) is a Malian politician.

Ousmane Sy was born in Bandiagara, Mali. He received his higher education in France. He holds a Doctorate in Economic and Social Development (University of Paris I) and two advanced Diplomas with specializations in agricultural development (Paris I) and agricultural economics (ISTOM, Le Havre).

Sy was appointed as an expert adviser to the United Nations Development Programme and later headed the Commission for Decentralization and Institutional Reform in Mali. He served as Minister for Territorial Administration and Local Communities under President Alpha Oumar Konaré.

He was in charge of the Malian presidential elections in 2002, which were won by Amadou Toumani Toure. The elections were said by critics to be fraudulent. Mr Sy is on record as saying that he could neither confirm nor deny whether there was rigging in those elections.

He is the founder of the Centre for Political and Institutional Expertise in Africa (CEPIA), a consultancy service which he has also directed since January 2004.

In May 2005, Sy was awarded the King Baudouin International Development Prize.

"for the strength of his vision and the courage of his convictions on the subject of governance in Africa, and for the originality of his campaigns in Mali by which, through a participatory process of decentralization and the organization of transparent elections, he has succeeded in creating an environment conducive to a better public administration and increased stability, two conditions that are crucial for development."

The Baudouin prize was worth 150,000 Euros and Mr Sy says he will spend it on his organisation, CEPIA.

In July 2009, Mr. Sy became a member of the SNV Netherlands Development Organisation's International Advisory Board to contribute his experience and expertise to the organisation's sustainable development work.

== Publications ==
- Charles Lépold Mayer, ed. (November 2009), Reconstruire l'Afrique, vers une nouvelle gouvernance fondée sur les dynamiques locales (PDF) (in French), p. 222
