= Souhayr Belhassen =

Tunisian journalist and human rights activist

- سهير بلحسن
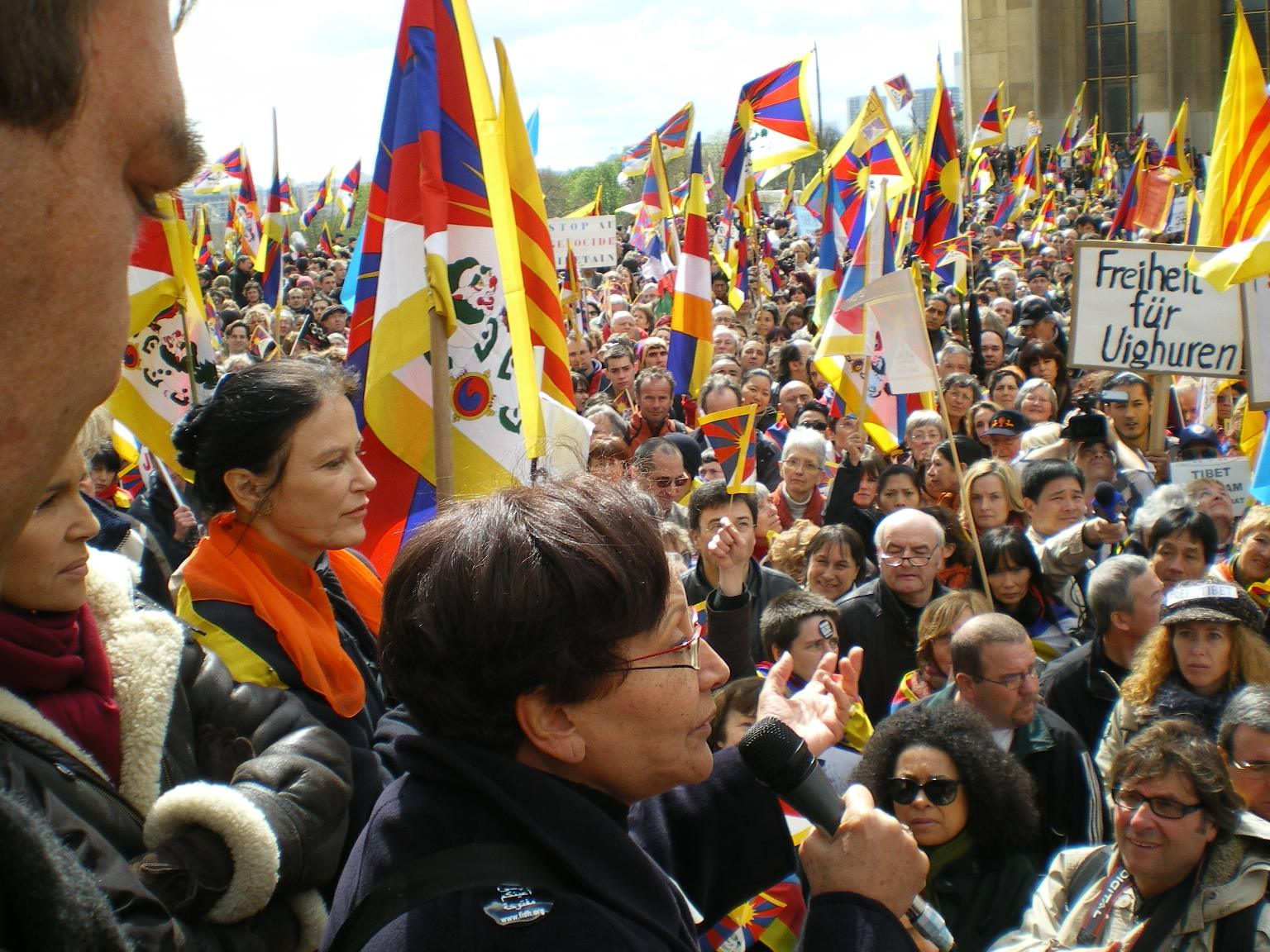
- Belhassen in 2008

University of Tunisia

Personal details
- Born: 19 June 1943 (age 83) Gabès, Tunisia
- Profession: Journalist

Souhayr Belhassen (born 19 June 1943) is a Tunisian human rights activist and journalist.

== Biography ==
She has served as the President of the International Federation for Human Rights (FIDH) based in Paris since April 26, 2007. Belhassen is a vocal critic of former Tunisian President Zine El Abidine Ben Ali, who was ousted during the 2010–2011 Tunisian protests, calling the former government's crackdown on protesters "a massacre."

Souhayr Belhassen also participated in the writing of Habib Bourguiba. Biography in two volumes (co-written with Sophie Bessis) a biography of president Habib Bourguiba.

She worked as a journalist for about twenty years. From late 1970s, she also worked as à correspondent in Tunisia, for the weekly Jeune Afrique and Reuters News Agency. . She was also very active in the fight for the defense of human rights in her country, by joining in 1984 the Tunisian Human Rights League, founded in 1977. In November 2002 she took over the organisation as vice-president.

Born of a Tunisian parents in Indonesia, she is the granddaughter of Hachemi Elmekki, journalist and founder of nationalist satirical newspapers written in Tunisian Arabic.She graduated in law from the University of Tunis and then from the Institute of Political Studies in Paris.

In 2004, she joined the board of directors of the International Federation for Human Rights. She was elected on April 24, 2007 at the head of this NGO, replacing the Senegalese Sidiki Kaba who supported her.

== Awards ==
- In 2011, she was awarded the North–South Prize.
- On 30 April 2011 Sohayer Belhassen obtained the "Takreem Arab Woman of the Year" The awards was presented to her at the Katara Cultural Village in Doha.
