= Abbas Gullet =

Personal details
- Born: Abbas Gullet Modogashe, British Kenya
- Spouse: Zaratun Gullet
- Education: Lancaster University, McGill University, Hitotubashi University, and Bangalore School of Management
- Occupation: Humanitarian Worker

Abbas Gullet is a Kenyan humanitarian worker who, since 2001, has been secretary general of the Kenya Red Cross Society.

== Life and work ==
Gullet was born in Modogashe, Garissa, in 1959. Orphaned at an early age, he was adopted and raised by a family in Mombasa. His adoptive father was a role model for him.

Gullet received his basic education from Buxton Primary School before proceeding to Mombasa Technical.

Gullet worked for Kenya External Telecommunications Company and the Kenya Post and Telecommunications between 1978 and 1984, and first became part of Kenya Red Cross Society as a medical Officer in 1985. After several postings in Kenya and abroad, he was seconded by the International Federation of Red Cross and Red Crescent Societies (IFRCS) to Kenya in 2001.

During his tenure, he transformed the Society from one that was facing multiple challenges, to a vibrant growing humanitarian organization, for which he was named "UN in Kenya Person of the Year" in 2007.
