= Giusi Nicolini =

Italian politician (born 1961)

Mayor of Lampedusa e Linosa
- In office 8 May 2012 – 11 June 2017
- Preceded by: Bernardino De Rubeis
- Succeeded by: Salvatore Martello

Personal details
- Born: Giuseppina Maria Nicolini; 5 March 1961 (age 65) Lampedusa, Italy
- Party: Democratic Party

Giusi Nicolini (born Giuseppina Maria Nicolini; 5 March 1961) is an Italian politician who served as the mayor of Lampedusa e Linosa from 2012 to 2017.

== Biography ==
A member of the Legambiente environmentalist association, after having been Deputy Mayor and Councilor for the Environment of Lampedusa e Linosa from 1983 to 1988, Nicolini was elected mayor at the 2012 Italian local elections.

After the 2013 Lampedusa migrant shipwreck, in which more than 300 migrants drowned, Nicolini asked the European Union to realize a new European law on sanctuary and immigration rules. Due to her several efforts in order to promote integration and solidarity, she was named Mayor of the Month for July 2014 by the City Mayors organisation. On 16 May 2015 Nicolini was awarded the Theodor Heuss Foundation medal; and in December 2015 she received the Stuttgart Peace Prize. She also received the Olof Palme Prize and the Simone de Beauvoir Prize in 2016 and the UNESCO Award for Peace in 2017.

She was unsuccessful in her bid for re-election to mayoralty during the 2017 Italian local elections.
