= Council of Europe =

International organisation

Council of Europe Conseil de l'Europe (French)
- Flag Logo

- Current and former members of the Council of Europe Green – current members Light green – former member
- Headquarters: Palace of Europe, Strasbourg, France
- Official languages: English, French
- Type: Regional intergovernmental organisation
- Membership: 46 member states: Albania; Andorra; Armenia; Austria; Azerbaijan; Belgium; Bosnia and Herzegovina; Bulgaria; Croatia; Cyprus; Czech Republic; Denmark; Estonia; Finland; France; Georgia; Germany; Greece; Hungary; Iceland; Ireland; Italy; Latvia; Liechtenstein; Lithuania; Luxembourg; Malta; Moldova; Monaco; Montenegro; Netherlands; North Macedonia; Norway; Poland; Portugal; Romania; San Marino; Serbia; Slovakia; Slovenia; Spain; Sweden; Switzerland; Turkey; Ukraine; United Kingdom; 5 Council observers: Canada; Holy See; Japan; Mexico; United States; 3 Assembly observers: Canada; Israel; Mexico

Leaders
  - Secretary General: Alain Berset
  - Deputy Secretary General: Bjørn Berge
  - President of the Parliamentary Assembly: Petra Bayr
  - President of the Committee of Ministers: Ervin Ibrahimović
  - President of the Congress of Local and Regional Authorities: Gunn Marit Helgesen
- Legislature: Parliamentary Assembly

Establishment
  - Treaty of London: 5 May 1949; 77 years ago
- Website coe.int

The Council of Europe (CoE; French: Conseil de l'Europe, CdE) is an international organisation which aims to uphold human rights, democracy and the rule of law in Europe. Founded in 1949, it is Europe's oldest intergovernmental organisation with the largest number of Member States, representing 46 European (Note: Depending on varying geographic definitions, some member states or portions thereof may be considered transcontinental or Eurasian (Armenia, Azerbaijan, (Note: Transcontinental country straddling both Europe and Asia.) Cyprus, Georgia and Turkey), or belonging to the Americas (Dutch Caribbean, French Guiana, and Greenland), Oceania (French Polynesia), and Africa (Canary Islands, Ceuta, Mayotte, Melilla, and Réunion)) member states. The council is an official United Nations observer. The headquarters of the Council of Europe, as well as the European Court of Human Rights – one of its main bodies – are situated in Strasbourg, France. Field offices are spread in over 16 countries, including in Africa, namely Morocco and Tunisia. The Council uses English and French as its two official languages. The Committee of Ministers, the PACE, and the Congress of the Council of Europe also use German and Italian for some of their work. The council's two statutory bodies are the Committee of Ministers, which comprises the foreign ministers of each member state, and the Parliamentary Assembly of the Council of Europe (PACE), which is composed of members of the national parliaments of each member state. The Commissioner for Human Rights is an institution within the Council of Europe, mandated to promote awareness of and respect for human rights within the member states. The secretary general presides over the secretariat of the organisation. Other major CoE bodies include the European Directorate for the Quality of Medicines & HealthCare (EDQM) and the European Audiovisual Observatory. The 1949 Statute of the Council of Europe established the organization, initially among Western European states. Portugal and Spain joined in 1976 and 1977 via the Portuguese and Spanish transitions to democracies. Following the revolutions of 1989 and dissolution of the Soviet Union, all post-Warsaw Pact and post-Yugoslav states countries joined (except Kosovo), as well as all European post-Soviet states except Belarus and Kazakhstan. Russia became the first country expelled from the Council, following its 2022 invasion of Ukraine.

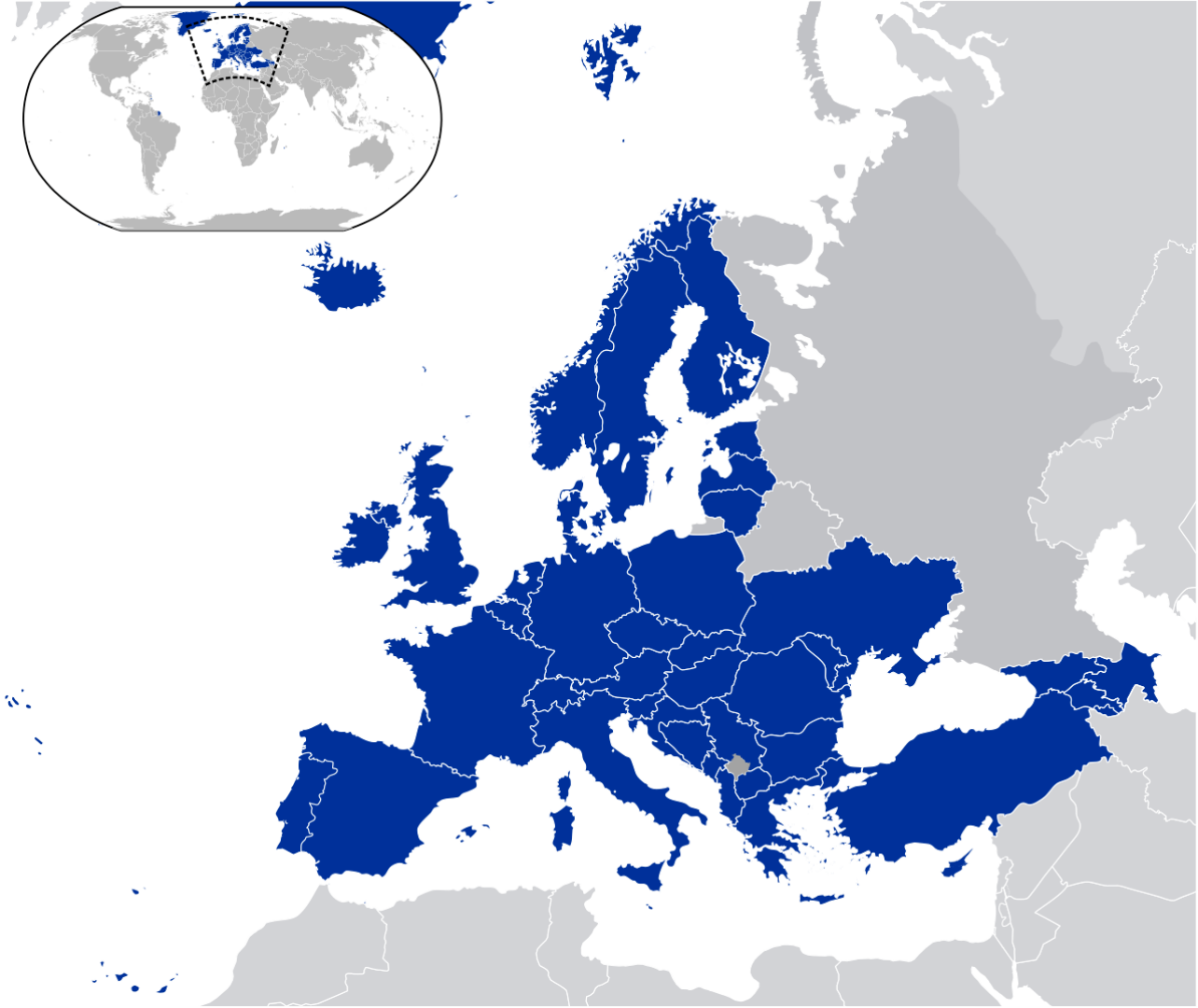
Current Member states of the Council of Europe. In addition, the European Convention on Human Rights (ECHR) applies in Kosovo as a result of domestic incorporation of the ECHR.

Unlike the EU, the Council of Europe cannot make binding laws; however, the council has produced a number of international standards and treaties, including the European Convention on Human Rights (ECHR), which also gave birth to one of its best-known bodies – the European Court of Human Rights, which rules on alleged violations of the ECHR. If the Court finds a violation, its judgments are legally binding on the state concerned – and the state may have to pay compensation or change its laws or practices. Provisions from the convention are incorporated in domestic law in many participating countries.

The organisation is distinct from the European Union (EU), although people sometimes confuse the two organisations – partly because the EU has adopted the original European flag, designed for the Council of Europe in 1955, as well as the European anthem. No country has ever joined the EU without first belonging to the Council of Europe, and it has been said that to see these interstate institutions of post-war Europe as clearly separate is "profoundly misleading". It operates with an annual ordinary budget of 656 million euros.

== History ==
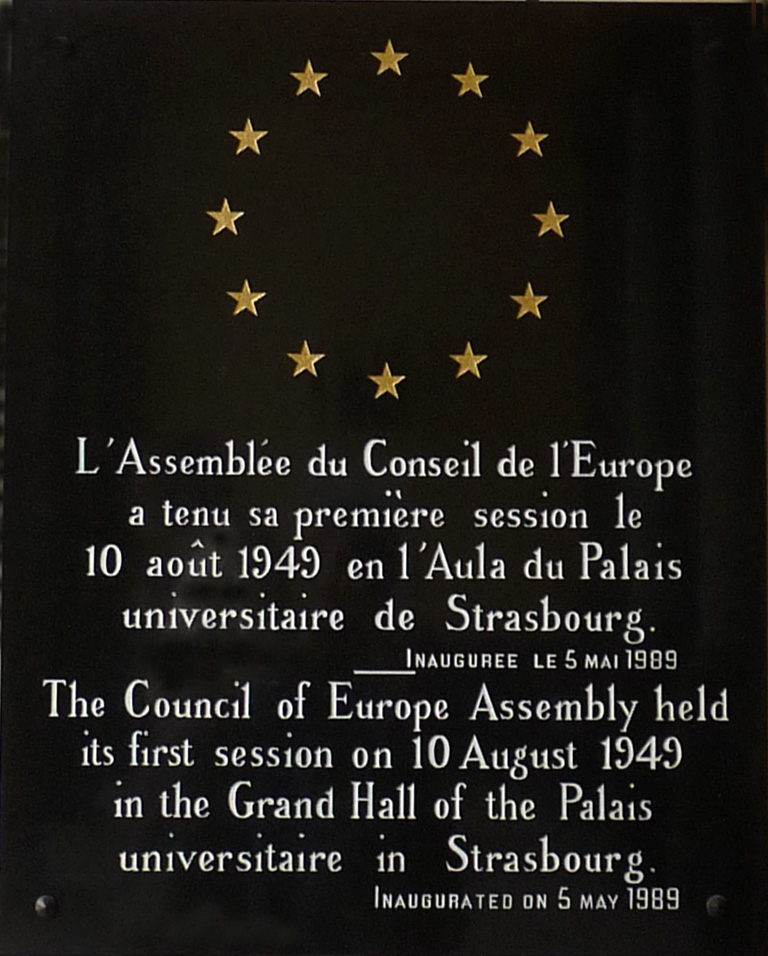
Plaque commemorating the first session of the Council of Europe Assembly at Strasbourg University

=== Founding ===
The idea of European unification gathered impetus after the First World War, with a number of politicians and thinkers raising the issue, including European pioneer Count Richard von Coudenhove-Kalergi, French Foreign Minister Aristide Briand, the Polish statesman Józef Piłsudski and others. A number of "pan-European" movements were established in several countries. But it was the devastation of World War II that led to fresh calls - with wider support and at a higher political level - for the creation of a political body to give these ideas practical shape.

The United Kingdom's wartime Prime Minister Winston Churchill first privately floated the idea of a "Council of Europe" in a letter to his then Foreign Secretary Anthony Eden on 21 October 1942, while the war was still raging. A few months later, in a BBC radio talk broadcast on 21 March 1943, he presented the proposal publicly for the first time. In his own words, he tried to "peer through the mists of the future to the end of the war", and think about how to rebuild and maintain peace on a shattered continent. Given that Europe had been at the origin of two world wars, the creation of such a body would be, he suggested, "a stupendous business".

He returned to the idea during a well-known speech at the University of Zurich on 19 September 1946, throwing the full weight of his considerable post-war prestige behind it, fleshing out the details and generating political momentum for the creation of the Council.

Additionally, there were also many other statesmen and politicians across the continent, many of them members of the European Movement, who were quietly working towards the creation of the council. Some regarded it as a guarantee that the horrors of war – or the human rights violations of the Nazi regime – could never again be visited on the continent, others came to see it as a "club of democracies", built around a set of common values that could stand as a bulwark against totalitarian states belonging to the Eastern Bloc. Others again saw it as a nascent "United States of Europe", the resonant phrase that Churchill had reached for at Zurich in 1946.

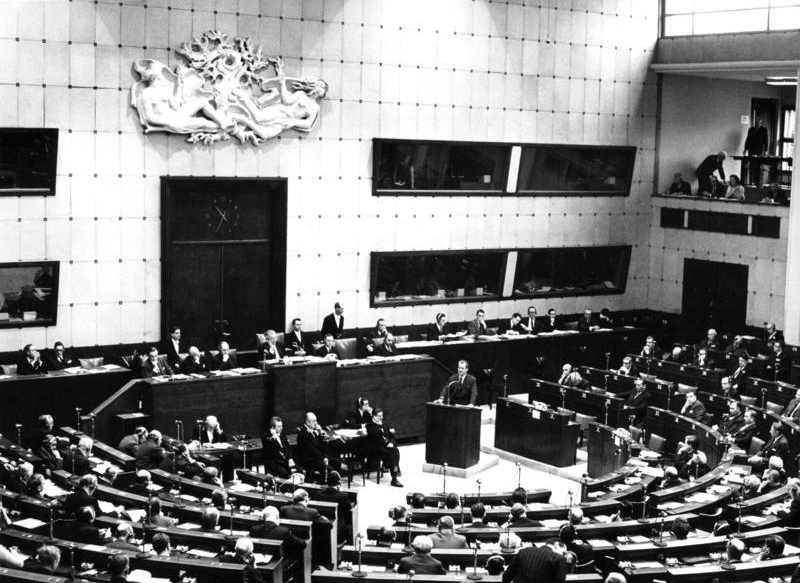
Session of the Council of Europe's Parliamentary Assembly in the former House of Europe in Strasbourg in 1967. Willy Brandt, German Minister for Foreign Affairs, is speaking.

The future structure of the Council of Europe was discussed at the Congress of Europe, which brought together several hundred leading politicians, government representatives and members of civil society in The Hague, Netherlands, in 1948, with Churchill as guest of honour. Responding to the conclusions of the Congress of Europe, the Consultative Council of the Treaty of Brussels convened a Committee for the Study of European Unity, which met eight times from November 1948 to January 1949 to draw up the blueprint of a new broad-based European organisation.

There were two competing schools of thought: some favoured a classical international organisation with representatives of governments, while others preferred a political forum with parliamentarians. Both approaches were finally combined through the creation of a Committee of Ministers (in which governments were represented) and a Consultative Assembly (in which parliaments were represented), the two main bodies mentioned in the Statute of the Council of Europe. This dual intergovernmental and inter-parliamentary structure was later copied for the European Communities, NATO and OSCE.

The Council of Europe was signed into existence on 5 May 1949 by the Treaty of London, the organisation's founding Statute which set out the three basic values that should guide its work: democracy, human rights and the rule of law. It was signed in London on that day by ten states: Belgium, Denmark, France, Ireland, Italy, Luxembourg, the Netherlands, Norway, Sweden and the United Kingdom, though Turkey and Greece joined three months later.

On 10 August 1949, 100 members of the council's Consultative Assembly, parliamentarians drawn from the twelve member nations, met in Strasbourg for its first plenary session, held over 18 sittings and lasting nearly a month. They debated how to reconcile and reconstruct a continent still reeling from war, yet already facing a new East-West divide, launched the radical concept of a trans-national court to protect the basic human rights of every citizen, and took the first steps in a process that eventually led to the creation of an offshoot organisation, the European Union.

In August 1949, Paul-Henri Spaak resigned as Belgium's foreign minister in order to be elected as the first president of the assembly. Behind the scenes, he too had been quietly working towards the creation of the council, and played a key role in steering its early work. However, in December 1951, after nearly three years in the role, Spaak resigned in disappointment after the Assembly rejected proposals for a "European political authority". Convinced that the Council of Europe was never going to be in a position to achieve his long-term goal of a unified Europe, he soon tried again in a new and more promising format, based this time on economic integration, becoming one of the founders of the European Union.

=== Early years ===
During the early years of the Council of Europe, its founders drafted what was to become the European Convention on Human Rights, a charter of individual rights which – it was hoped – no member government could ever again violate. They drew, in part, on the tenets of the Universal Declaration of Human Rights, signed only a few months earlier in Paris. But where the Universal Declaration was essentially aspirational, the European Convention featured an enforcement mechanism – an international Court – which was to adjudicate on alleged violations of its articles and to hold governments to account. Today, this is the European Court of Human Rights, whose rulings are binding on 46 European nations, the most far-reaching system of international justice anywhere in the world.

One of the council's first acts was to welcome West Germany into its fold on 2 May 1951, setting a pattern of post-war reconciliation that was to become a hallmark of the council, and beginning a long process of "enlargement" which saw the organisation grow from its original ten founding member states to the 46 nations that make up the Council of Europe today. Iceland had already joined in 1950, followed in 1956 by Austria, Cyprus in 1961, Switzerland in 1963 and Malta in 1965.

=== Historic speeches at the Council of Europe ===
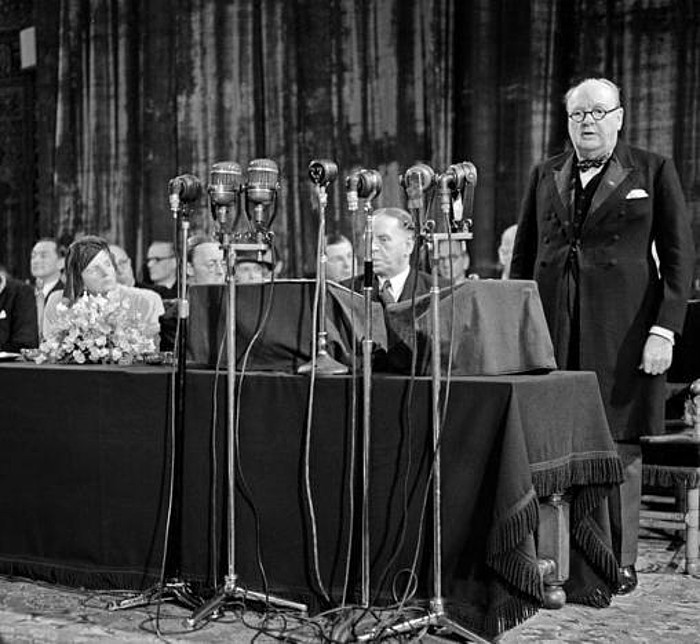
Winston Churchill's inaugural speech of the Council of Europe in The Hague

In 2018, an archive of all speeches made to the PACE by heads of state or government since the Council of Europe's creation in 1949 appeared online, the fruit of a two-year project entitled "Voices of Europe". At the time of its launch, the archive comprised 263 speeches delivered over a 70-year period by some 216 presidents, prime ministers, monarchs and religious leaders from 45 countries – though it continues to expand, as new speeches are added every few months.

Some very early speeches by individuals considered to be "founding figures" of the European institutions, even if they were not heads of state or government at the time, are also included (such as Sir Winston Churchill or Robert Schuman). Addresses by eight monarchs appear in the list (such as King Juan Carlos I of Spain, King Albert II of Belgium and Grand Duke Henri of Luxembourg) as well as the speeches given by religious figures (such as Pope John Paul II, and Pope Francis) and several leaders from countries in the Middle East and North Africa (such as Shimon Peres, Yasser Arafat, Hosni Mubarak, Léopold Sédar Senghor or King Hussein of Jordan).

The full text of the speeches is given in both English and French, regardless of the original language used. The archive is searchable by country, by name, and chronologically.

== Aims and achievement ==
Article 1(a) of the Statute states that "The aim of the Council of Europe is to achieve a greater unity between its members for the purpose of safeguarding and realising the ideals and principles which are their common heritage and facilitating their economic and social progress." Membership is open to all European states who seek harmony, cooperation, good governance and human rights, accepting the principle of the rule of law and are able and willing to guarantee democracy, fundamental human rights and freedoms.

Whereas the member states of the European Union transfer part of their national legislative and executive powers to the European Commission and the European Parliament, Council of Europe member states maintain their sovereignty but commit themselves through conventions/treaties (international law) and co-operate on the basis of common values and common political decisions. Those conventions and decisions are developed by the member states working together at the Council of Europe. Both organisations function as concentric circles around the common foundations for European cooperation and harmony, with the Council of Europe being the geographically wider circle. The European Union could be seen as the smaller circle with a much higher level of integration through the transfer of powers from the national to the EU level. "The Council of Europe and the European Union: different roles, shared values." Council of Europe conventions/treaties are also open for signature to non-member states, thus facilitating equal co-operation with countries outside Europe.

The Council of Europe's most famous achievement is the European Convention on Human Rights, which was adopted in 1950 following a report by the PACE, and followed on from the United Nations Universal Declaration of Human Rights (UDHR). The Convention created the European Court of Human Rights in Strasbourg. The Court supervises compliance with the European Convention on Human Rights and thus functions as the highest European court. It is to this court that Europeans can bring cases if they believe that a member country has violated their fundamental rights and freedoms.

The various activities and achievements of the Council of Europe can be found in detail on its official website. The Council of Europe works in the following areas:

- Protection of the rule of law and fostering legal co-operation through some 200 conventions and other treaties, including such leading instruments as the Budapest Convention on Cybercrime, the Convention on the Prevention of Terrorism, Conventions against Corruption and Organised Crime, the Convention on Action against Trafficking in Human Beings, and the Convention on Human Rights and Biomedicine
- CODEXTER, designed to co-ordinate counter-terrorism measures
- The European Commission for the Efficiency of Justice (CEPEJ)
- Protection of human rights, notably through:
  - the European Convention on Human Rights
  - the European Committee for the Prevention of Torture
  - the European Commission against Racism and Intolerance
  - the Convention on Action against Trafficking in Human Beings
  - the Convention for the protection of individuals with regard to automatic processing of personal data
  - the Convention on the Protection of Children against Sexual Exploitation and Sexual Abuse
    - This has also included work in the sport area advocating for safe sport and developing safe sport policy self-assessment tools for national sport organisations
  - The Convention on preventing and combating violence against women and domestic violence.
  - social rights under the European Social Charter
  - European Charter of Local Self-Government guaranteeing the political, administrative and financial independence of local authorities.
  - linguistic rights under the European Charter for Regional or Minority Languages
  - minority rights under the Framework Convention for the Protection of National Minorities
  - Media freedom under Article 10 of the European Convention on Human Rights and the European Convention on Transfrontier Television
- Protection of democracy through parliamentary scrutiny and election monitoring by its Parliamentary Assembly as well as assistance in democratic reforms, in particular by the Venice Commission
- Promotion of cultural cooperation and diversity under the Council of Europe's Cultural Convention of 1954 and several conventions on the protection of cultural heritage as well as through its Centre for Modern Languages in Graz, Austria, and its North-South Centre in Lisbon, Portugal
- Promotion of the right to education under Article 2 of the first Protocol to the European Convention on Human Rights and several conventions on the recognition of university studies and diplomas (see also Bologna Process and Lisbon Recognition Convention)
- Promotion of fair sport through the Anti-Doping Convention
- Promotion of European youth exchanges and cooperation through European Youth Centres in Strasbourg and Budapest, Hungary
- Promotion of the quality of medicines throughout Europe by the European Directorate for the Quality of Medicines and its European Pharmacopoeia
- Support for intercultural integration through the Intercultural Cities (ICC) programme. This programme offers information and advice for local authorities on the integration of minorities and the prevention of discrimination.

== Institutions ==
The institutions of the Council of Europe are:

- The Secretary General, who is elected for a term of five years by the PACE and heads the Secretariat of the Council of Europe. On 25 June 2024, Alain Berset was elected Secretary General of the Council of Europe, and assumed his role on 18 September 2024 succeeding Marija Pejčinović Burić.
- The Committee of Ministers, comprising the Ministers of Foreign Affairs of all 46 member states who are represented by their Permanent Representatives and Ambassadors accredited to the Council of Europe. Committee of Ministers' presidencies are held in alphabetical order for six months following the English alphabet: Iceland November 2022 – May 2023, Latvia May 2023 – November 2023, the Liechtenstein November 2023 – May 2024, Lithuania May 2024 – November 2024, Luxembourg November 2024 – May 2025, Malta May 2025 – November 2025, Moldova November 2025 – May 2026, and so on.
  Council's Parliamentary Assembly hemicycle
- The Parliamentary Assembly of the Council of Europe (PACE), which comprises national parliamentarians from all member states. Adopting resolutions and recommendations to governments, the Assembly holds a dialogue with its governmental counterpart, the Committee of Ministers, and is often regarded as the "motor" of the organisation. The national parliamentary delegations to the Assembly must reflect the political spectrum of their national parliament, i.e. comprise government and opposition parties. The Assembly appoints members as rapporteurs with the mandate to prepare parliamentary reports on specific subjects. The British MP Sir David Maxwell-Fyfe was rapporteur for the drafting of the European Convention on Human Rights. Dick Marty's reports on secret CIA detentions and rendition flights in Europe became quite famous in 2006 and 2007. Other Assembly reports were instrumental in, for example, the abolition of the death penalty in Europe, highlighting the political and human rights situation in Chechnya, identifying who was responsible for disappeared persons in Belarus, chronicling threats to freedom of expression in the media and many other subjects.
- The Congress of Local and Regional Authorities, which was created in 1994 and comprises political representatives from local and regional authorities in all member states. The most influential instruments of the Council of Europe in this field are the European Charter of Local Self-Government of 1985 and the European Outline Convention on Transfrontier Co-operation between Territorial Communities or Authorities of 1980.
- The European Court of Human Rights, created under the European Convention on Human Rights of 1950, is composed of a judge from each member state elected for a single, non-renewable term of nine years by the PACE and is headed by the elected president of the court. The current president of the court is Guido Raimondi from Italy. Under the recent Protocol No. 14 to the European Convention on Human Rights, the Court's case processing was reformed and streamlined. Ratification of Protocol No. 14 was delayed by Russia for a number of years, but won support to be passed in January 2010.
- The Commissioner for Human Rights is elected by the PACE for a non-renewable term of six years since the creation of this position in 1999. Since April 2024, this position has been held by Michael O'Flaherty from Ireland.
- The Conference of INGOs. NGOs can participate in the INGOs Conference of the Council of Europe. Since the Resolution (2003)8 adopted by the Committee of Ministers on 19 November 2003, they are given a "participatory status".
- The Joint Council on Youth of the Council of Europe. The European Steering Committee (CDEJ) on Youth and the Advisory Council on Youth (CCJ) of the Council of Europe form together the Joint Council on Youth (CMJ). The CDEJ brings together representatives of ministries or bodies responsible for youth matters from the 50 States Parties to the European Cultural Convention. The CDEJ fosters cooperation between governments in the youth sector and provides a framework for comparing national youth policies, exchanging best practices and drafting standard-setting texts. The Advisory Council on Youth comprises 30 representatives of non-governmental youth organisations and networks. It provides opinions and input from youth NGOs on all youth sector activities and ensures that young people are involved in the council's other activities.
- Information Offices of the Council of Europe in many member states.

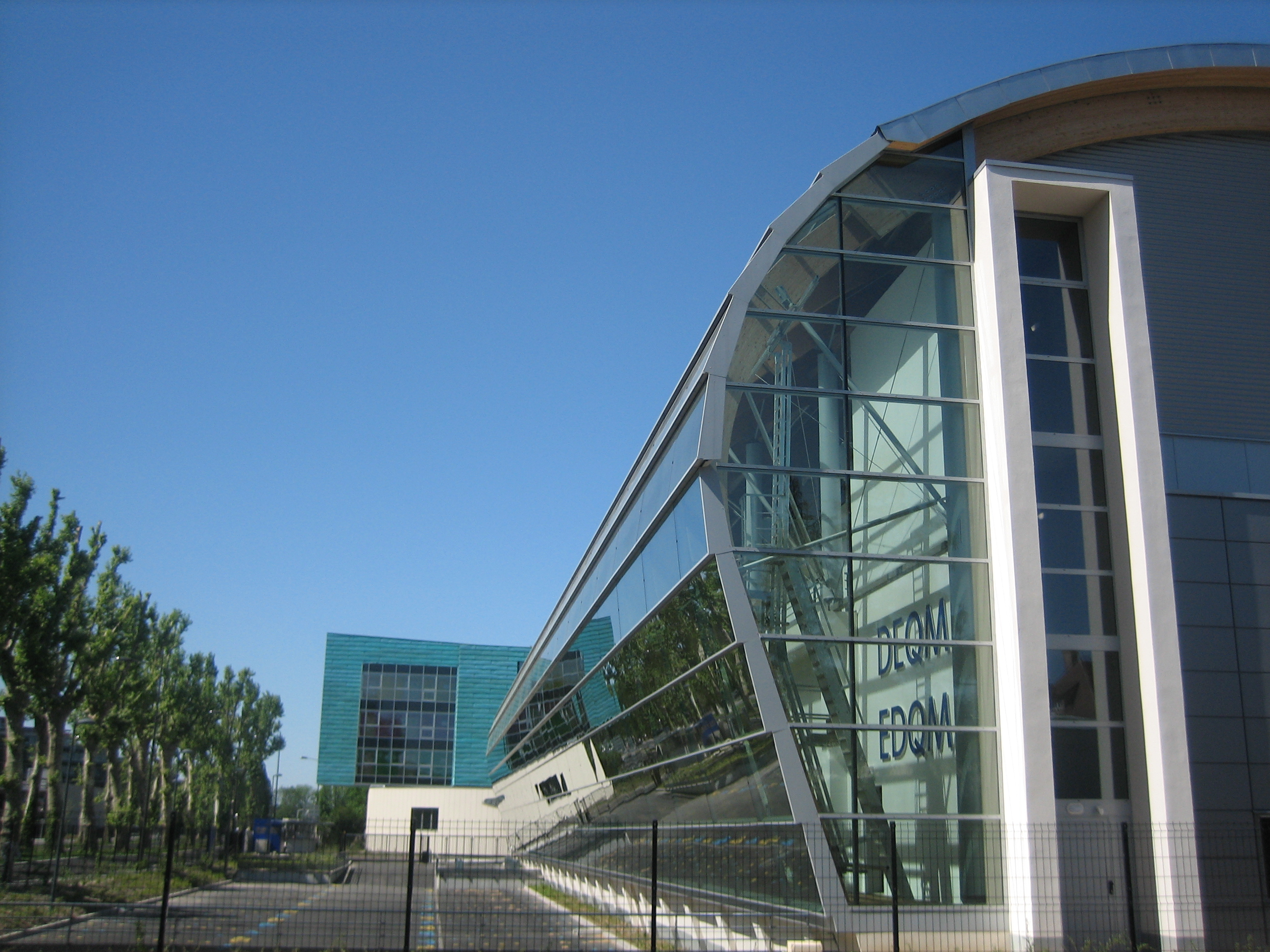
European Directorate for the Quality of Medicines

=== Partial agreements ===
The CoE system also includes a number of semi-autonomous structures known as "partial agreements", some of which are also open to non-member states:

- The Council of Europe Development Bank in Paris
- The European Directorate for the Quality of Medicines with its European Pharmacopoeia
- The European Audiovisual Observatory
- The European Support Fund Eurimages for the co-production and distribution of films
- The Enlarged Partial Agreement on Cultural Routes, which awards the certification "Cultural Route of the Council of Europe" to transnational networks promoting European heritage and intercultural dialogue (Luxembourg)
- The Pompidou Group – Cooperation Group to Combat Drug Abuse and Illicit Trafficking in Drugs.
- The European Commission for Democracy through Law, better known as the Venice Commission
- The Group of States Against Corruption (GRECO)
- The European and Mediterranean Major Hazards Agreement (EUR-OPA) which is a platform for cooperation between European and Southern Mediterranean countries in the field of major natural and technological disasters
- The Enlarged Partial Agreement on Sport, which is open to accession by states and sports associations.
- The North-South Centre of the Council of Europe in Lisbon (Portugal)
- The European Centre for Modern Languages in Graz (Austria)
- The Register of Damage for Ukraine, a register for Ukrainians to seek compensation for damages from the Russian invasion of Ukraine

=== Summits ===
Occasionally the Council of Europe organises summits of the heads of state and government of its member states. Four summits have been held to date with the fourth concluding on 17 May 2023.

Overview of Council of Europe summits
Date	Host country	Host city
8–9 October 1993	Austria	Vienna
10–11 October 1997	France	Strasbourg
16–17 May 2005	Poland	Warsaw
16–17 May 2023	Iceland	Reykjavík

=== Headquarters and buildings ===
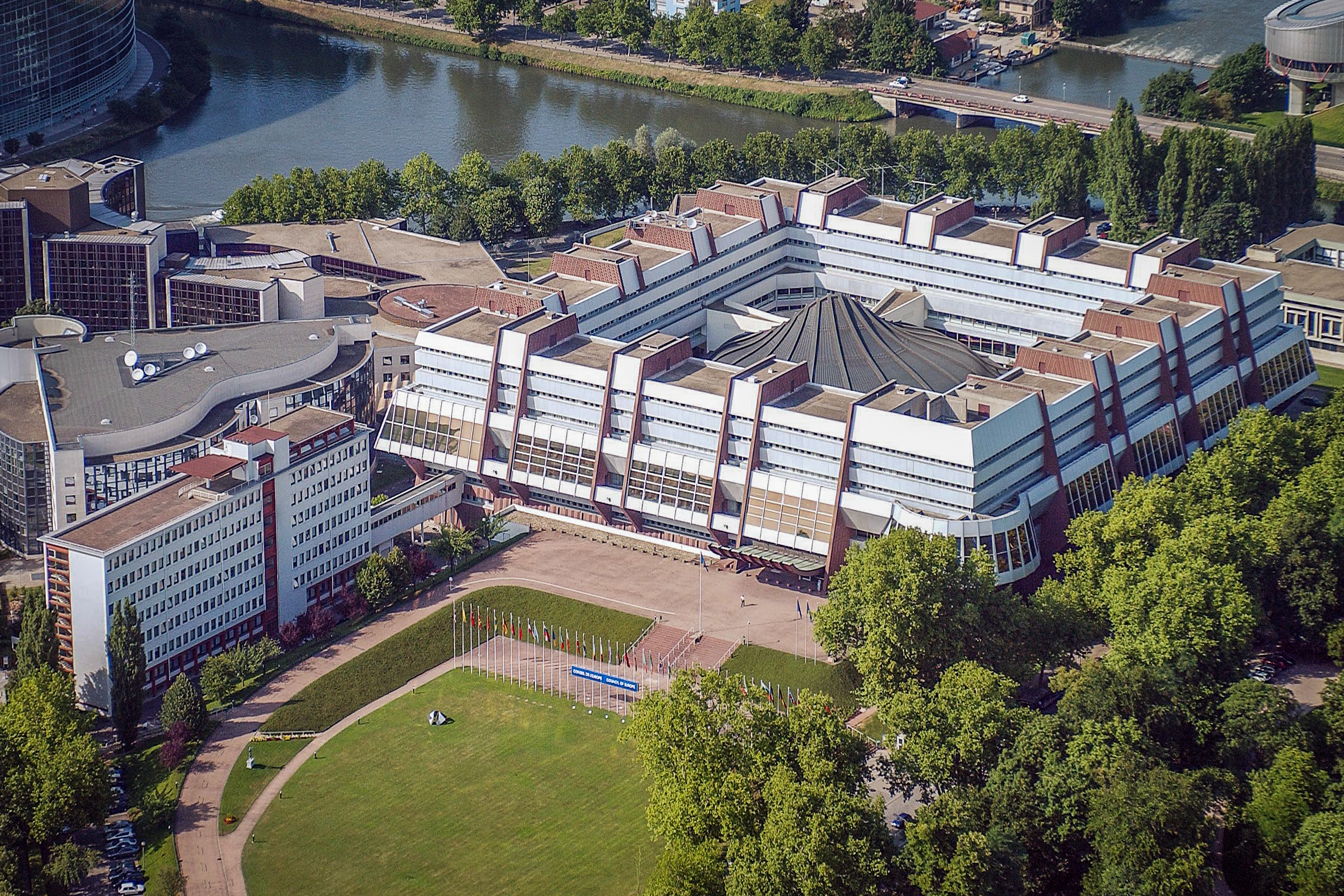
Aerial shot of the Palace of Europe in Strasbourg

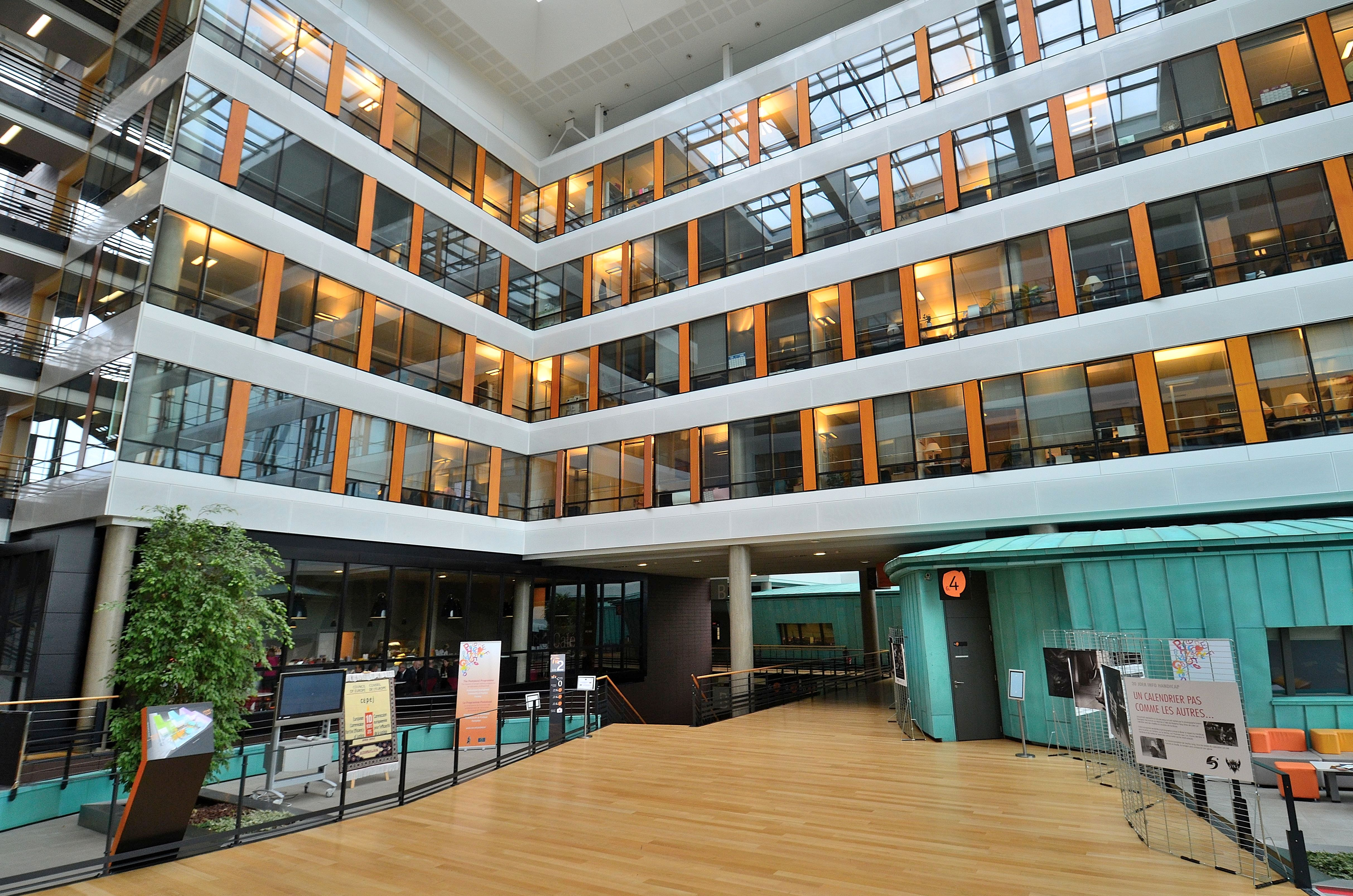
Council of Europe's Agora building

The seat of the Council of Europe is in Strasbourg, France. First meetings were held in Strasbourg's University Palace in 1949, but the Council of Europe soon moved into its own buildings. The Council of Europe's eight main buildings are situated in the Quartier européen, an area in the northeast of Strasbourg spread over the three districts of Le Wacken, La Robertsau and Quartier de l'Orangerie, where are also located the four buildings of the seat of the European Parliament in Strasbourg, the Arte headquarters and the seat of the International Institute of Human Rights.

Building in the area started in 1949 with the predecessor of the Palais de l'Europe, the Palace of Europe (demolished in 1977), and came to a provisional end in 2007 with the opening of the New General Office Building, later named "Agora", in 2008. The Palace of Europe and the Art Nouveau Villa Schutzenberger (seat of the European Audiovisual Observatory) are in the Orangerie district, and the European Court of Human Rights, the EDQM and the Agora Building are in the Robertsau district. The Agora building has been voted "best international business centre real estate project of 2007" on 13 March 2008, at the MIPIM 2008. The European Youth Centre is located in the Wacken district.

Besides its headquarters in Strasbourg, the Council of Europe is also present in other cities and countries. The Council of Europe Development Bank has its seat in Paris, the North-South Centre of the Council of Europe is established in Lisbon, Portugal, and the Centre for Modern Languages is in Graz, Austria. There are European Youth Centres in Budapest, Hungary, and in Strasbourg. The European Wergeland Centre, a new Resource Centre on education for intercultural dialogue, human rights and democratic citizenship, operated in cooperation with the Norwegian Government, opened in Oslo, Norway, in February 2009.

The Council of Europe has external offices all over the European continent and beyond. There are four 'Programme Offices', namely in Ankara, Podgorica, Skopje, and Venice. There are also 'Council of Europe Offices' in Baku, Belgrade, Chisinau, Kyiv, Paris, Pristina, Sarajevo, Tbilisi, Tirana, and Yerevan. Bucharest has a Council of Europe Office on Cybercrime. There are also Council of Europe Offices in non-European capital cities like Rabat and Tunis.

Additionally, there are four "Council of Europe Liaison Offices":

- Council of Europe Liaison Office in Brussels: The office is in charge of liaison with the European Union
- Council of Europe Office in Geneva: Permanent Delegation of the Council of Europe to the United Nations Office and other international organisations in Geneva
- Council of Europe Office in Vienna: The office is in charge of liaison with the OSCE, United Nations Office, and other international organisations in Vienna
- Council of Europe Office in Warsaw: The office is in charge of liaison with other international organisations and institutions in Warsaw, in particular, the Office for Democratic Institutions and Human Rights (OSCE/ODIHR)

== Member states, observers, partners ==
=== Eligibility ===
There are two main criteria for membership: geographic (Article 4 of the Council of Europe Statute specifies that membership is open to any "European" State) and political (Article 3 of the Statute states applying for membership must accept democratic values—"Every member of the Council of Europe must accept the principles of the rule of law and the enjoyment by all persons within its jurisdiction of human rights and fundamental freedoms, and collaborate sincerely and effectively in the realisation of the aim of the Council as specified in Chapter I").

Since "European" is not defined in international law, the definition of "European" has been a question that has recurred during the CoE's history. Turkey was admitted in 1950, although it is a transcontinental state that lies mostly in Asia, with a smaller portion in Europe. In 1994, the PACE adopted Recommendation 1247, which said that admission to the CoE should be "in principle open only to states whose national territory lies wholly or partly in Europe"; later, however, the Assembly extended eligibility to apply and be admitted to Armenia, Azerbaijan and Georgia.

=== Member states and observers ===
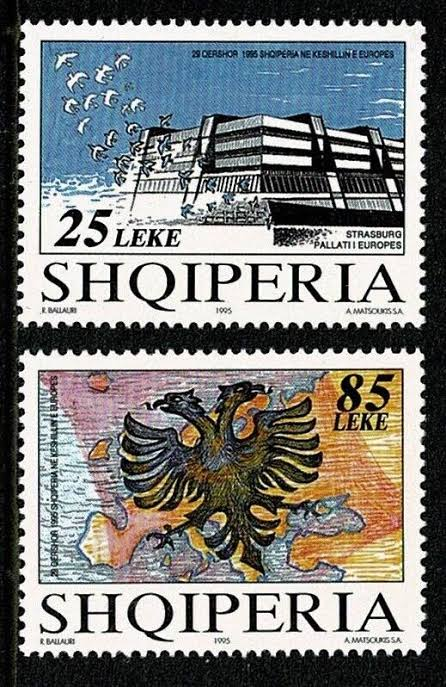
Postage stamp marks Albania as a member of the Council of Europe 1995.

The Council of Europe was founded on 5 May 1949 by Belgium, Denmark, France, Ireland, Italy, Luxembourg, Netherlands, Norway, Sweden and the United Kingdom. Greece and Turkey joined three months later. Iceland, West Germany and Saar Protectorate joined the Council of Europe as associate members in 1950. West Germany became a full member in 1951, and the Saar withdrew its application after it joined West Germany following the 1955 Saar Statute referendum. Joining later were Austria (1956), Cyprus (1961), Switzerland (1963), Malta (1965) and Portugal (1976). Spain joined in 1977, two years after the death of its dictator Francisco Franco and the Spanish transition to democracy. Next to join were Liechtenstein (1978), San Marino (1988) and Finland (1989). After the fall of Communism with the Revolutions of 1989 and the collapse of the Soviet Union, the following countries in Europe joined: Hungary (1990), Poland (1991), Bulgaria (1992), Estonia (1993), Lithuania (1993), Slovenia (1993), the Czech Republic (1993), Slovakia (1993), Romania (1993), Andorra (1994), Latvia (1995), Moldova (1995), Albania (1995), Ukraine (1995), the former Yugoslav Republic of Macedonia (1995) (later renamed North Macedonia), Russia (1996, expelled 2022), Croatia (1996), Georgia (1999), Armenia (2001), Azerbaijan (2001), Bosnia and Herzegovina (2002), Serbia and Montenegro (later Serbia) (2003), Monaco (2004) and Montenegro (2007). After Russia's expulsion in 2022, the Council has 46 member states.

Although most Council members are predominantly Christian in heritage, there are four Muslim-majority member states: Bosnia and Herzegovina, Turkey, Albania and Azerbaijan.

The CoE has granted some countries a status that allows them to participate in CoE activities without being full members. There are three types of nonmember status: associate member, special guest and observer. Associate member status was created for former Axis states which had not yet regained their sovereignty since their defeat in the Second World War; as such, it is no longer used, although there have been proposals to reactivate it to permit enhanced participation by the current observer states. "Special guest" status was used as a transitional status for post-Soviet countries that wished to join the council after the fall of the Berlin Wall and is no longer commonly used. "Observer" status is for non-European nations who accept democracy, rule of law, and human rights, and wish to participate in Council initiatives. The United States became an observer state in 1995. Currently, Canada, the Holy See, Japan, Mexico and the United States are observer states, while Israel is an observer to the PACE. Additionally Kosovo is a member of the Council of Europe Development Bank and a member of the Council of Europe's Venice Commission. The Assembly of Kosovo was invited to take part in the work of the Parliamentary Assembly of the Council of Europe and its committees as an observer in 2016. Two representatives of local government in Kosovo participate in the work of the Congress of Local and Regional Authorities as observers.

=== Withdrawal, suspension, and expulsion ===
The Statute of the Council of Europe provides for the voluntary suspension, involuntary suspension, and exclusion of members. Article 8 of the Statute provides that any member who has "seriously violated" Article 3 may be suspended from its rights of representation, and that the Committee of Ministers may request that such a member withdraws from the Council under Article 7. (The Statute does not define the "serious violation" phrase. Under Article 8 of the Statute, if a member state fails to withdraw upon request, the Committee may terminate its membership, in consultation with the PACE.

The Council suspended Greece in 1967, after a military coup d'état, and the Greek junta withdrew from the CoE. Greece was readmitted to the council in 1974.

==== Suspension and exclusion of Russia ====
Russia became a member of the Council of Europe in 1996. In 2014, after Russia annexed Crimea from Ukraine and supported separatists in eastern Ukraine, the Council stripped Russia of its voting rights in the PACE. In response, Russia began to boycott the Assembly in 2016, and beginning from 2017 ceased paying its annual membership dues of 32.6 million euros (US$37.1 million) to the Council placing the institution under financial strain.

Russia stated that its suspension by the council was unfair, and demanded the restoration of its voting rights. Russia had threatened to withdraw from the Council unless its voting rights were restored in time for the election of a new secretary general. European Council secretary-general Thorbjørn Jagland organised a special committee to find a compromise with Russia in early 2018, a move that was criticised by some as giving in to alleged Russian pressure by Council members and academic observers, especially if voting sanctions were lifted. In June 2019, an approximately two-thirds majority of the Council voted (on a 118–62 vote, with 10 abstentions) to restore Russia's voting rights in the council. Opponents of lifting the suspension included Ukraine and other post-Soviet countries, such as the Baltic states, who argued that readmission amounted to normalising Russia's malign activity. Supporters of restoring Russia's council rights included France and Germany, which argued that a Russian withdrawal from the council would be harmful because it would deprive Russian citizens of their ability to initiate cases in the European Court of Human Rights.

On 3 March 2022, after Russia launched a full-scale military invasion of Ukraine, the council suspended Russia for violations of the council's statute and the European Convention on Human Rights (ECHR). The suspension blocked Russia from participation in the council's ministerial council, the PACE, and the Council of the Baltic Sea States, but still left Russia obligated to follow the ECHR. On 15 March 2022, hours before the vote to expel the country, Russia initiated a voluntary withdrawal procedure from the council. The Russian delegation planned to deliver its formal withdrawal on 31 December 2022, and announced its intent to denounce the ECHR. However, on the same day, the council's Committee of Ministers decided Russia's membership in the council would be terminated immediately, and determined that Russia had been removed from the Council under its exclusion mechanism rather than through the withdrawal mechanism. After being excluded from the Council of Europe, Russia's former president and prime minister Dmitry Medvedev endorsed restoring the death penalty in Russia.

== Co-operation ==
=== Conventions: European Treaty Series ===
The Council of Europe works mainly through international treaties, usually called conventions in its system. By drafting conventions or international treaties, common legal standards are set for its member states. The conventions are collected in the European Treaty Series.

=== Non-member states ===
Several conventions have also been opened for signature to non-member states. Important examples are the Budapest Convention on Cybercrime (signed for example, by Canada, Japan, South Africa and the United States), the Lisbon Recognition Convention on the recognition of study periods and degrees (signed for example, by Australia, Belarus, Canada, the Holy See, Israel, Kazakhstan, Kyrgyzstan, New Zealand and the United States), the Anti-doping Convention (signed, for example, by Australia, Belarus, Canada and Tunisia) and the Convention on the Conservation of European Wildlife and Natural Habitats (signed for example, by Burkina Faso, Morocco, Tunisia and Senegal as well as the European Community). Non-member states also participate in several partial agreements, such as the Venice Commission, the Group of States Against Corruption (GRECO), the European Pharmacopoeia Commission and the North-South Centre.

Invitations to sign and ratify relevant conventions of the Council of Europe on a case-by-case basis are sent to three groups of non-member entities:

- Non-European states: Algeria, Argentina, Australia, Bahamas, Bolivia, Brazil, Burkina Faso, Chile, China, Colombia, Costa Rica, Dominican Republic, Ecuador, El Salvador, Honduras, Kyrgyzstan, Lebanon, Malaysia, Mauritius, Morocco, New Zealand, Panama, Peru, Philippines, Senegal, South Africa, South Korea, Syria, Tajikistan, Tonga, Trinidad and Tobago, Tunisia, Uruguay, Venezuela and the observers Canada, Israel, Japan, Mexico, United States.
- European states: Belarus, Kazakhstan, Kosovo, Russia and the observer Holy See.
- The European Community and later the European Union after its legal personality was established by the ratification of the EU's Lisbon Treaty.

=== European Union ===
A clickable Euler diagram showing the relationships between various European regional organisations

The Council of Europe is not to be confused with the Council of the European Union (the "Council of Ministers") or the European Council, which belong to the European Union, an entirely separate body from the Council of Europe, although they have shared the same European flag and anthem since the 1980s since they both work for European integration.

Cooperation between the European Union and the Council of Europe was reinforced in the mid-2000s, notably on culture and education as well as on the international enforcement of justice and Human Rights.

The European Union is expected to accede to the European Convention on Human Rights (the convention). There are also concerns about consistency in case law – the European Court of Justice (the EU's court in Luxembourg) is treating the convention as part of the legal system of all EU member states in order to prevent conflict between its judgements and those of the European Court of Human Rights (the court in Strasbourg interpreting the convention). Protocol No. 14 of the convention is designed to allow the EU to accede to it and the EU Treaty of Lisbon contains a protocol binding the EU to join. The EU would thus be subject to its human rights law and external monitoring as its member states currently are.

=== Schools of Political Studies ===
The Council of Europe Schools of Political Studies were established to train future generations of political, economic, social and cultural leaders in countries in transition. With the participation of national and international experts, they run annual series of seminars and conferences on topics such as European integration, democracy, human rights, the rule of law and globalisation. The first School of Political Studies was created in Moscow in 1992. By 2020, 20 other schools had been set up along the same lines, forming an association; a network covering the whole of Eastern and South-Eastern Europe and the Caucasus, as well as some countries in the Southern Mediterranean region. The schools are part of the Education Department, which is part of the Directorate of Democratic Participation within the Directorate General of Democracy ("DGII") of the Council of Europe.

=== United Nations ===
Cooperation between the CoE and the UN started with the agreement signed by the Secretariats of these institutions on 15 December 1951. On 17 October 1989, the General Assembly of the United Nations approved a resolution on granting observer status to the Council of Europe which was proposed by several member states of the CoE. Currently, the Council of Europe holds observer status with the United Nations and is regularly represented in the UN General Assembly. It has organised the regional UN conferences against racism and on women. It co-operates with the United Nations at many levels, in particular in the areas of human rights, minorities, migration and counter-terrorism. In November 2016, the UN General Assembly adopted by consensus Resolution (A/Res/71/17) on Cooperation between the United Nations and the Council of Europe whereby it acknowledged the contribution of the Council of Europe to the protection and strengthening of human rights and fundamental freedoms, democracy and the rule of law, welcomed the ongoing co-operation in a variety of fields.

=== Non-governmental organisations ===
Non-governmental organisations (NGOs) can participate in the INGOs Conference of the Council of Europe and become observers to inter-governmental committees of experts. The Council of Europe drafted the European Convention on the Recognition of the Legal Personality of International Non-Governmental Organisations in 1986, which sets the legal basis for the existence and work of NGOs in Europe. Article 11 of the European Convention on Human Rights protects the right to freedom of association, which is also a fundamental norm for NGOs. The rules for consultative status for INGOs appended to the resolution (93)38 "On relation between the Council of Europe and non-governmental organisations", adopted by the Committee of Ministers on 18 October 1993 at the 500th meeting of the Ministers' Deputies. On 19 November 2003, the Committee of Ministers changed the consultative status into a participatory status, "considering that it is indispensable that the rules governing the relations between the Council of Europe and NGOs evolve to reflect the active participation of international non-governmental organisations (INGOs) in the Organisation's policy and work programme".

=== Others ===
On 30 May 2018, the Council of Europe signed a memorandum of understanding with the European football confederation UEFA.

The Council of Europe also signed an agreement with FIFA in which the two agreed to strengthen future cooperation in areas of common interests. The deal which included cooperation between member states in the sport of football and safety and security at football matches was finalised in October 2018.

== Characteristics ==
=== Privileges and immunities ===
The General Agreement on Privileges and Immunities of the Council of Europe grants the organisation certain privileges and immunities.

The working conditions of staff are governed by the council's staff regulations, which are public. Salaries and emoluments paid by the Council of Europe to its officials are tax-exempt on the basis of Article 18 of the General Agreement on Privileges and Immunities of the Council of Europe.

=== Symbol and anthem ===
The Council of Europe created, and has since 1955 used as its official symbol, the European Flag with 12 golden stars arranged in a circle on a blue background.

Its musical anthem since 1972, the "European anthem", is based on the "Ode to Joy" theme from Ludwig van Beethoven's ninth symphony.

On 5 May 1964, the 15th anniversary of its founding, the Council of Europe established 5 May as Europe Day.

The wide private and public use of the European Flag is encouraged to symbolise a European dimension. To avoid confusion with the European Union which subsequently adopted the same flag in the 1980s, as well as other European institutions, the Council of Europe often uses a modified version with a lower-case "e" surrounding the stars which are referred to as the "Council of Europe Logo".

== Criticism and controversies ==
Both Human Rights Watch and the European Stability Initiative have called on the Council of Europe to undertake concrete actions to show that it is willing and able to return to its "original mission to protect and ensure human rights", despite launching political and economic activities that could generate redundancies with other international organisations (including the European Union and OCSE).

In October 2022, a new and different Pan-European meeting of 44 states was held, as the "inaugural summit of the European Political Community", a new forum largely organised by French President Emmanuel Macron. The Council of Europe, sidelined, reportedly was "perplexed" with this development, with a spokesperson stating "In the field of human rights, democracy and the rule of law, such a pan-European community already exists: it is the Council of Europe." A feature of the new forum is that Russia and Belarus are deliberately excluded, which was not seen as explaining the need for a different entity, given that at the time, Russia was no longer a member of the Council of Europe and Belarus only participated partially, as a non-member.

=== "Caviar diplomacy" scandal ===
After Azerbaijan joined the CoE in 2001, both the Council and its Parliamentary Assembly were criticised for having a weak response to election rigging and human rights violations in Azerbaijan. The Human Rights Watch criticised the Council of Europe in 2014 for allowing Azerbaijan to assume the six-month rotating chairmanship of the council's Committee of Ministers, writing that the Azeri government's repression of human rights defenders, dissidents, and journalists "shows sheer contempt for its commitments to the Council of Europe". An internal inquiry was set up in 2017 amid allegations of bribery by Azerbaijan government officials and criticism of "caviar diplomacy" at the council. A 219-page report was issued in 2018 after a ten-month investigation. It concluded that several members of the Parliamentary Assembly broke CoE ethical rules and were "strongly suspected" of corruption; it strongly criticised former Parliamentary Assembly president Pedro Agramunt and suggested that he had engaged in "corruptive activities" before his resignation under pressure in 2017. The inquiry also named Italian member Luca Volontè as a suspect in "activities of a corruptive nature". Volontè was investigated by Italian police and accused by Italian prosecutors in 2017 of receiving over 2.39 million euros in bribes in exchange for working for Azerbaijan in the parliamentary assembly, and that in 2013 he played a key role in orchestrating the defeat of a highly critical report on the abuse of political prisoners in Azerbaijan. In 2021, Volontè was convicted of accepting bribes from Azerbaijani officials to water down critiques of the nation's human rights record, and he was sentenced by a court in Milan to four years in prison.

== See also ==
- CAHDI
- Council of Europe–European Union relations
- Common European Framework of Reference for Languages
- Conference of Specialised Ministers
- Council of Europe Archives
- The Europe Prize
- European Anti-fraud Office
- European Political Community
- Film Award of the Council of Europe
- Human rights in Europe
- Moneyval
- International organisations in Europe, and co-ordinated organisations
- List of Council of Europe treaties
- List of linguistic rights in European constitutions
- North–South Centre of the Council of Europe
