= Kenyatta International Convention Centre =

Building in Nairobi, Kenya

Kenyatta International Conference Centre
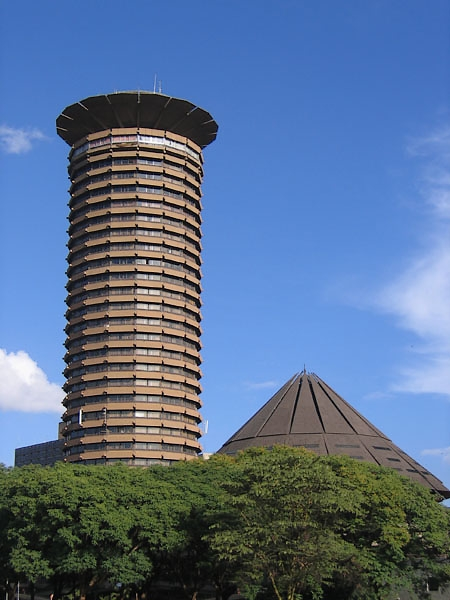
- Kenyatta International Conference Centre, 2006
- Interactive map of the Kenyatta International Conference Centre area

Record height
- Preceded by: Hilton Nairobi
- Surpassed by: Teleposta Towers

General information
- Type: Commercial
- Location: Nairobi, Kenya
- Coordinates: 1°17′19″S 36°49′23″E
- Completed: 1974

Height
- Roof: 105 m (344 ft)
- Top floor: 28

Technical details
- Floor count: 32
- Floor area: 225,000 sq metres
- Lifts/elevators: 5

Design and construction
- Architect: Karl Henrik Nøstvik

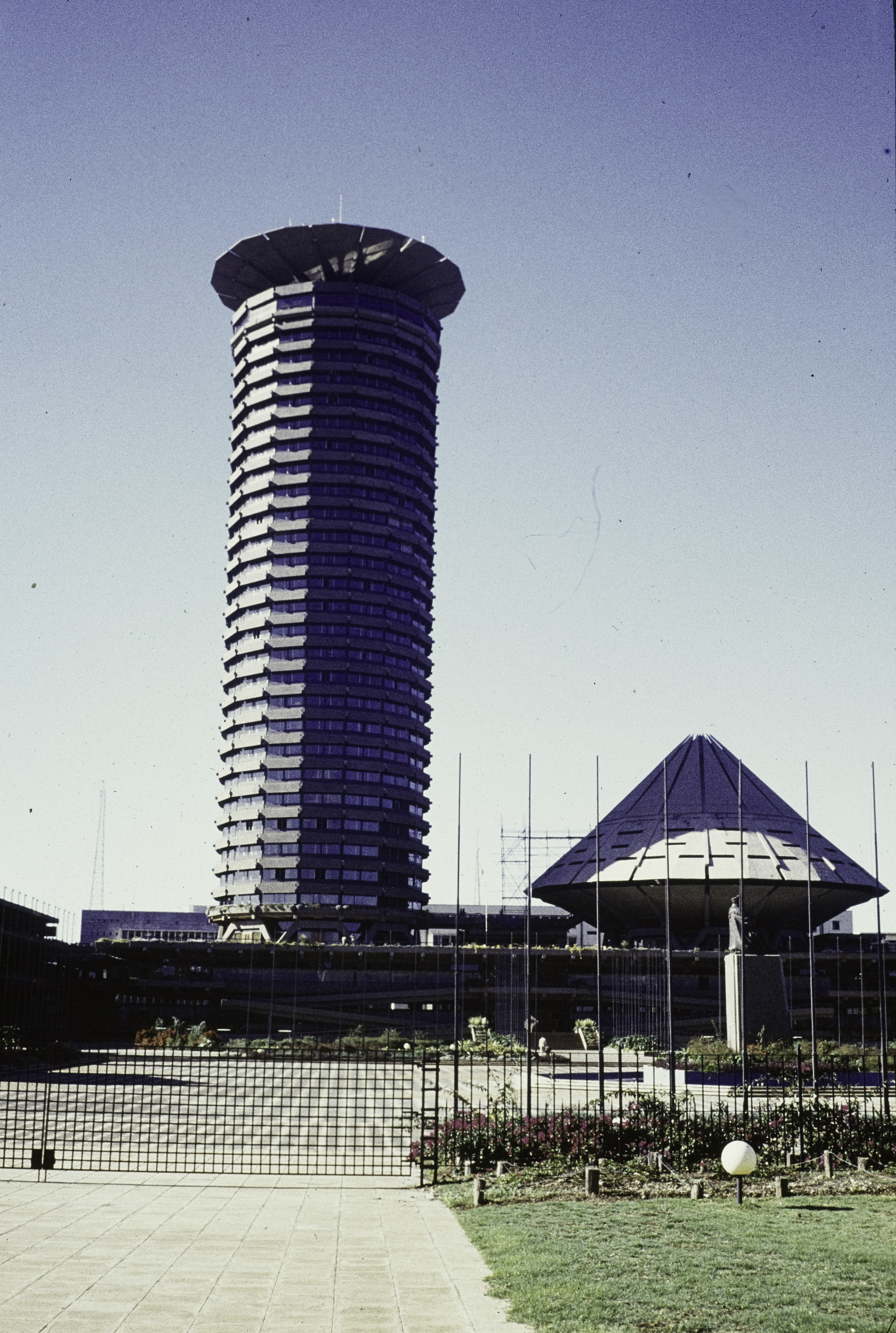
Kenyatta International Conference Centre, 1975.

The Kenyatta International Convention Centre (KICC), formerly the Kenyatta International Conference Centre, is a 32-story building located in Nairobi, Kenya. The KICC is located in the City Square of Nairobi, and is a crucial address for a number of Government offices, including those of recently elected Senators.

The KICC has been listed among the top venues for hosting conferences on the continent. After completion, the building held the rank of the tallest building in Nairobi up until the construction of Teleposta Towers. The building has since then ceded its position as the tallest tower to a host of other newer projects including the UAP Old Mutual Tower, Times Tower and the Britam Tower, which is the tallest building in Nairobi as of 2020.

== History ==
The Kenyatta International Conference Centre, locally known as the "KICC", was commissioned by Mzee Jomo Kenyatta, the first President of the Republic of Kenya, in 1967. It was designed by Karl Henrik Nøstvik architect with David Mutiso. The construction was carried out by contractors Solel Boneh & Factah. This was done in three phases. Phase I was the construction of the podium, Phase II consisted of the main tower and Phase III involved the Plenary. Construction was completed in 1973, with the opening ceremony occurring in September 1973 presided over by President Kenyatta. The KICC was then made a State Corporation established under the Tourism Act in 2011, which came into operation on 1 September 2012. Whereas the centre is known as a leading meeting venue in Nairobi, its national mandate following the Act became to nurture and promote the country as a destination most preferred for business travel and MICE tourism. M.I.C.E has been recognized as one of the four key products to be developed under the Kenya Vision 2030.

In September 2013, as the complex celebrated its 40th anniversary, it was renamed to the Kenyatta International Convention Centre.

== Structure ==
=== General ===
The KICC currently stands as the ninth tallest building in Kenya, reaching a height of just over 105 metres. It succeeded the Hilton Nairobi as the tallest building in Kenya, a position it held for 26 years before being surpassed by Teleposta Tower. The tower consists of 32 floors, including a revolving restaurant which offers panoramic views of the city, rotating 360° in 76 minutes. The building's light terracotta façade reflects traditional African architecture, as does the use of simple solid shapes- cuboids make up the Plenary hall, the tower consists of a cylinder composed of several cuboids and the amphitheatre and helipad both resemble cones.

There are several well-equipped conference and meeting rooms with the largest having a capacity over 6,000 delegates. The KICC is equipped with Simultaneous Interpretation Equipment with a capability of up to seven languages, a modern business centre, a banking facility, tour and travel services, expansive grounds and ample and secure parking. It is often depicted as an icon of Nairobi.

Up until the 1980s, there was a 'revolving restaurant' atop the KICC that was popular with politicians and the elite, but years of neglect literally brought it to a halt, though concerted efforts in 2012 to revive it were somewhat short lived. The 148-seater restaurant has a revolving mortar programmed to make approximately one revolution in 76 minutes.

=== The Amphitheatre ===
The amphitheater is designed for medium-sized events and accommodates 800 people on three balconies surrounding the auditorium, making it suitable for business meetings. It is equipped with simultaneous interpretation Booths, full logic recording facilities, a public address system and sound proofing.

=== Tsavo Ballroom ===
The largest conference chamber of its kind in East Africa, the plenary is fortified with sound proof grey stone, deep natural wood and lofty ceilings. It caters for large international meetings, exhibitions and grand balls, and has a capacity of 5000 people. It is equipped with Advanced Sound Amplification & recording systems, Wireless Simultaneous interpretation Equipment (up to 7 languages) booths, and observer galleries. Its high ceilings were made for elaborate décor, hosting banners and other promotional materials.

=== Courtyard ===
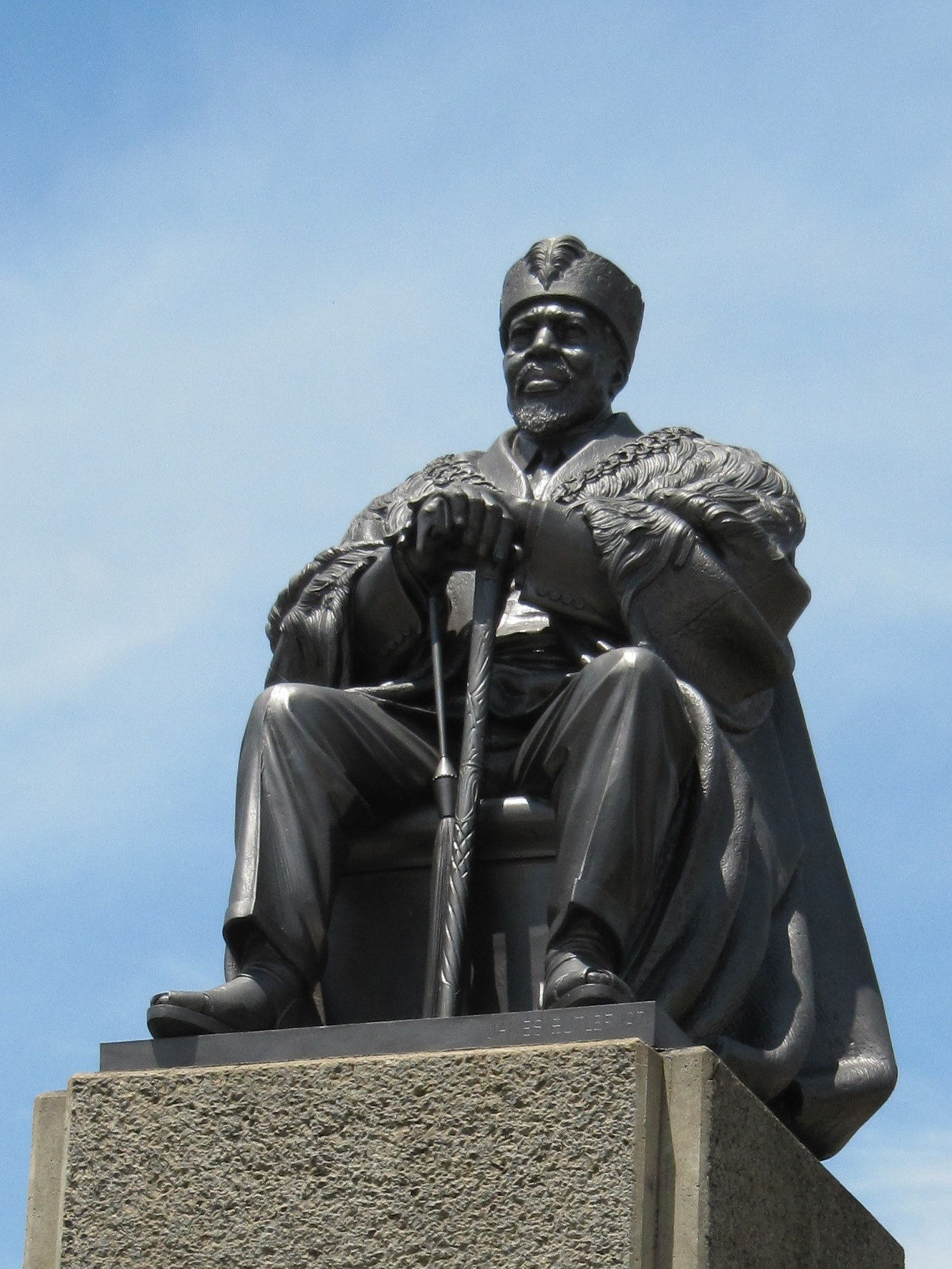
The statue of Kenyatta (1971) by James Butler at the KICC

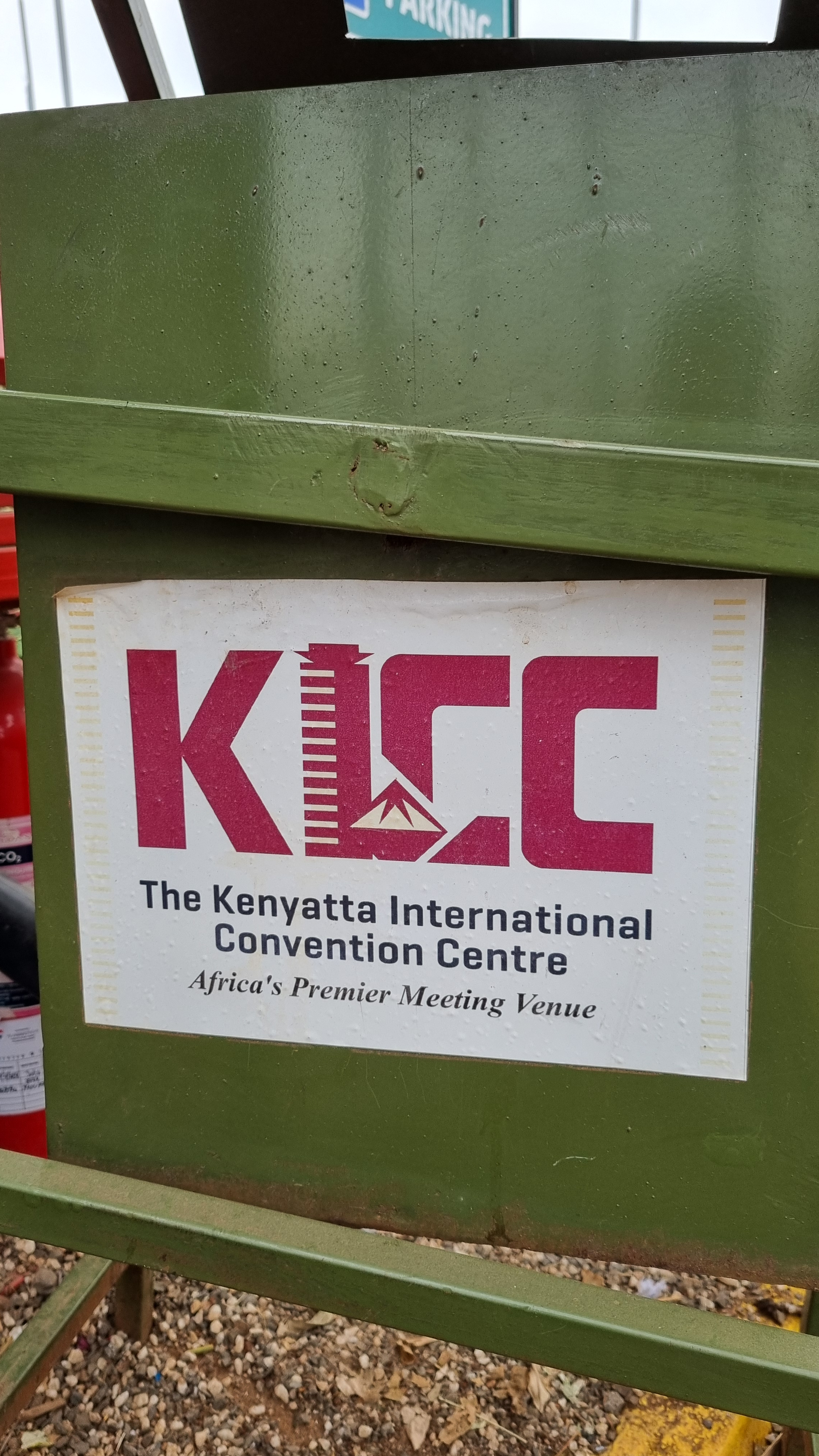
The official KICC logo

This is a paved 75 square meter courtyard surrounding the 1971 statue of Kenyatta by James Butler. The courtyard was designed as a respite for those attending conferences and includes gardens, pools and geyser fountains. Numerous flag poles and balconies in the courtyard are fashioned to host promotional identities.
