= Old Mutual Holdings =

Kenyan investment, retirement and insurance group

Old Mutual Holdings Plc

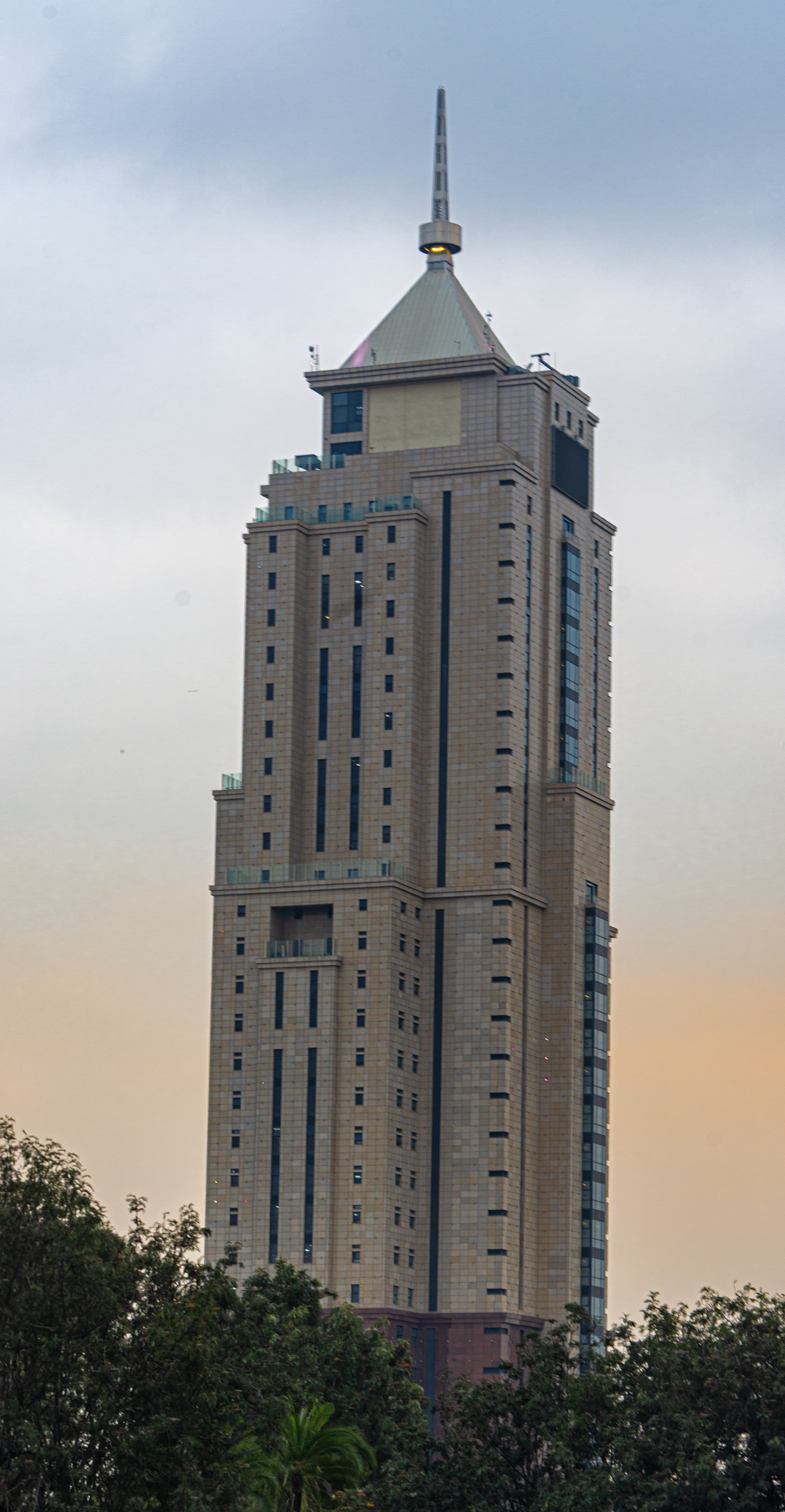
- Old Mutual Tower building, Nairobi
- Company type: Public company: OTC
- Industry: Insurance, financial services
- Founded: 1920; 106 years ago
- Headquarters: UAP Old Mutual Tower; Upper Hill Road; Nairobi, Kenya
- Key people: Arthur Oginga (CEO), Joseph B. Wanjui (Chairman)
- Products: Life and health insurance, investment management, Investment advisory, brokerage, real estate investment trusts
- Revenue: ▲KSh 16.8 billion (2015)
- Net income: ▼KSh 890 million (2015)
- Total assets: ▲KSh 48.7 billion (2015)
- Website: www.uapoldmutual.com

Old Mutual Holdings Plc, formally known as UAP Holdings Limited, is an investment, retirement, and insurance group that operates mainly in Eastern Africa. UAP Holdings is one of the leading insurance and financial services groups in eastern Africa with a network of branches and operational subsidiaries spread across the greater eastern and central Africa regions.

The group's headquarters are located in Nairobi, Kenya, with subsidiaries in Kenya, Uganda, South Sudan, Rwanda, Tanzania, the Democratic Republic of Congo, and Mauritius. The Mauritius units are holding companies for the non-Kenyan operations. The flagship company of the group is UAP Insurance Kenya.

== History ==
=== Origins ===
The Group's origins in Kenya date back to the 1920s when Provincial Insurance Company of East Africa was incorporated as a subsidiary of Provincial Insurance Company, an insurance group based in London, United Kingdom. The 1994 merger of Union des Assurances de Paris (UAP) of France and Provincial of the UK led to the formation of the UAP Insurance Company of Kenya. In 1996, the firm became part of Axa when Axa acquired UAP in France. Axa divested its shareholding in 2000 and the firm became a wholly owned Kenyan company.

UAP Holdings expanded to Uganda in 2005, to South Sudan in 2006, to Rwanda and the Democratic Republic of the Congo in 2011, and to Tanzania in 2013. All entries other than Tanzania were greenfield investments. The group entered Tanzania through the acquisition of Century Insurance Company Limited and re-branded it to UAP Century Insurance Company Limited. In total, UAP has sixteen businesses operating in the region.

=== Old Mutual ===
On 8 January 2015, Centum and Chris Kirubi announced that they had entered into an agreement with Old Mutual for the sale of their 13.75 per cent and 9.58 per cent stake in UAP Holdings, respectively, to the London Stock Exchange-listed financial giant in a deal valued at over KSh 7 billion. Once complete, Old Mutual will hold 23.33 per cent of UAP Holdings-issued shares and will act as a strategic investor to the group. On 27 January 2015, Kenyan print media reported that Old Mutual had acquired the shares in UAP Holdings previously owned by Abraaj, Africinvest, and Swedfund, amounting to 37.33 per cent of total shareholding, for US$155.5 million (KSh 14.2 billion), thereby raising Old Mutual's ownership in UAP Holdings to 60.66 per cent.

=== Merger into one company ===
In June 2015, shareholders of UAP Holdings agreed to merge with the parent company's other businesses in Kenya, to create a single entity that is referred to as UAP-Old Mutual Group. The combined company is expected to list its shares on the Nairobi Securities Exchange. In June 2015, Peter Mwangi was appointed chief executive officer of the UAP-Old Mutual Group. In April 2020, Arthur Oginga took over as CEO. Joe B. Wanjui, the former chairman of UAP Holdings, will assume the role of chairman of the new UAP Old Mutual Group.

== Subsidiaries and associated companies ==
The companies that comprise the Old Mutual Holdings include, but are not limited, to the following:

1. UAP Insurance Company Limited – Nairobi, Kenya – 100% Shareholding – The flagship company of the group. Offering general insurance.
2. UAP Life Assurance Limited – Nairobi, Kenya – 100% shareholding – Offering life insurance.
3. UAP Insurance Uganda Limited – Kampala, Uganda – 53% shareholding – Offering general insurance.
4. UAP Life Assurance Uganda Limited – Kampala, Uganda – 53% shareholding – Offering life insurance.
5. UAP Insurance South Sudan Limited – Juba, South Sudan – 100% shareholding – Offering general and life Insurance.
6. UAP Financial Services Kenya Limited – Nairobi, Kenya – 100% shareholding – Offering financial services, investment management, Investment advisory, and brokerage services.
7. UAP Financial Services Uganda Limited – Kampala, Uganda – 89% shareholding – Offering financial services, investment management, advisory and brokerage services.
8. UAP Investments – Nairobi, Kenya – 100% shareholding – Offering unit trusts and pension services.
9. UAP Properties Uganda Limited – Kampala, Uganda – 79% shareholding – real estate.
10. UAP Properties Kenya Limited – Nairobi, Kenya – 100% shareholding – real estate.
11. UAP Properties South Sudan Limited – Juba, South Sudan – 70% shareholding – real estate.
12. UAP Brokers – Kinshasa, Democratic Republic of Congo – Offering brokerage services.
13. Union Life Rwanda Ltd – Kigali, Rwanda – 100% shareholding – Offering life insurance.
14. Union Insurance Rwanda Ltd – Kigali, Rwanda – 100% shareholding – Offering general insurance.
15. UAP Century Insurance Company Limited – Dar es Salaam, Tanzania, – 60% shareholding – Offering general and life insurance.
16. UAP Africa Limited – Port Louis, Mauritius – 100% shareholding – Holding company for insurance businesses.
17. UAP Investments – Port Louis, Mauritius – 100% shareholding – Holding company for advisory financial service businesses.
18. UAP Properties – Port Louis, Mauritius – 100% shareholding – Holding company for real estate businesses.
19. UAP Global Services – Port Louis, Mauritius – 100% shareholding – Dormant.
20. UAP Credit Services – Port Louis, Mauritius – 100% shareholding – Dormant.

== Ownership ==
The shares of Old Mutual Holdings are traded over the counter at Dyer & Blair Investment Bank pending future listing on the Nairobi Securities Exchange. As of September 2018 the shareholding of Old Mutual Holdings is expected to look as depicted in the table below:

UAP Holdings Stock Ownership
Rank	Name of Owner	Per centage Ownership
1	Old Mutual East Africa Group^{1} of Kenya	43.34
2	Old Mutual Life Assurance Company (SA) Ltd^{1}	23.33
3	Bawan Limited	20.46
4	About 990 Other Local & International Investors	12.87
	Total	100.00

1 - These are subsidiaries of Old Mutual of South Africa. This gives Old Mutual 66.67% control of UAP Holdings.

== Building ==
UAP Holding opened UAP Old Mutual Tower, a 33-storey office complex in Nairobi's Upper Hill district. UAP Tower is set to becoming the tallest structure in eastern and central Africa upon its completion in 2015.

== See also ==
- Old Mutual
- Nairobi Stock Exchange
- Uganda Securities Exchange
- List of Insurance companies in Kenya
- List of insurance companies in Uganda
