= Jiangxi (disambiguation) =

Jiangxi is a province of China.

Jiangxi may also refer to these places in China:

- Jiangxi, Gansu (姜席), a town in Xihe County, Gansu
- Jiangxi, Guangxi (江西), a town in Nanning, Guangxi
- Jiangxi Subdistrict (江溪街道), a subdistrict of Xinwu District, Wuxi, Jiangsu
- Jiangxi province (Yuan dynasty), which included Jiangxi and Guangdong

== See also ==
- Jiangxi International, a Chinese construction and engineering company
- Jiangxi Air, a Chinese low-cost carrier
- Jianxi (disambiguation)
- Gangseo-gu (disambiguation)
  - Gangseo District, Busan, a district of Busan, South Korea
  - Gangseo District, Seoul, a district of Seoul, South Korea
