= Old Mutual East Africa Group =

Financial services conglomerate

- Company type: Private conglomerate
- Industry: Insurance, financial services
- Founded: 2015
- Headquarters: Nairobi, Kenya
- Key people: Joseph Wanjui; Chairman; Peter Mwangi; Group CEO
- Products: Life, health insurance, investment management, Investment advisory, brokerage, real estate investment trusts
- Number of employees: 4,000+
- Website: oldmutual.co.ke

Old Mutual East Africa Group is a financial services conglomerate that maintains its headquarters in Kenya, with subsidiaries in Uganda, Tanzania, South Sudan, Rwanda and the Democratic Republic of the Congo.

== Location ==
The headquarters of Old Mutual East Africa Group are located in the 33-storey Old Mutual Tower, located on Hospital Road, in Upper Hill, Nairobi, about 3 kilometres (2 mi), southwest of the city's central business district. The coordinates of the company headquarters are: 01°17'56.0"S, 36°49'10.0"E (Latitude:-1.298889; Longitude:36.819444).

== Overview ==
In 2014, Old Mutual acquired a controlling 67 percent interest in Faulu Kenya, the second-largest microfinance bank in Kenya, whose stock is privately held, for a sum of KSh3.6 billion (approx. US$40 million). In early 2015, Old Mutual, spent a total of US$253.1 million (KSh 23.1 billion) to acquire 60.66 percent shareholding in UAP Holdings. Later in 2015, Old Mutual began to consolidate all its investments in Kenya under one company, namely the "Old Mutual East Africa Group". The integration involves (a) UAP Holdings, in which Old Mutual owns 60.66 percent (b) Faulu Kenya, in which Old Mutual owns 67 percent and (c) the legacy businesses of Old Mutual Kenya, in which Old Mutual maintains 100 percent shareholding. Old Mutual plans to list its shares on the Nairobi Securities Exchange (NSE) in 2018, after the mergers are concluded.

== Governance ==
The group is governed by a 14-person board of directors chaired by Dr. Joseph Barrage Wanjui, a shareholder in the business. The Group CEO is Peter Mwangi, a certified public accountant and a chartered financial analyst.

== See also ==
- UAP Holdings
- Faulu Kenya
- Old Mutual
