= Rahimtulla Tower =

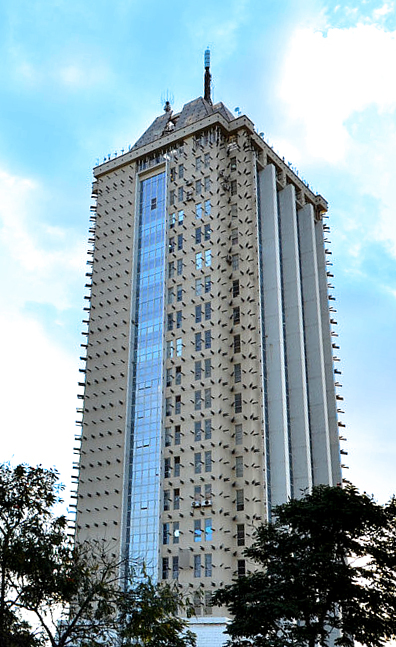
- Interactive map of the Rahimtulla Tower area

General information
- Type: Commercial
- Location: Upper Hill, Nairobi, Kenya
- Coordinates: 1°17′46″S 36°48′56″E
- Completed: 1999

Technical details
- Floor count: 22
- Floor area: 17,000 m^{2} (180,000 sq ft)

Design and construction
- Architect: Planning Systems Services
- Main contractor: Laxmanbhai Construction

Rahimtulla Tower, also known as the Rahimtulla Trust Building, is a tower in the Upper Hill neighbourhood of Nairobi, Kenya.

The tower is a reinforced concrete structure, and clad with blue-tinted glass and white louvre tiles. The tower has twenty-two storeys, including a double floor-height lobby, plus two basement floors. It is 16 storeys smaller than the New Central Bank Tower and the second tallest building in the country after the UAP Old Mutual Tower.

The building is capped by a 30-metre high mast, for television and radio communication. The main tenants are iWay Africa, PriceWaterhouseCoopers and Dhanush InfoTech. The architect is Planning Systems Services, the structural engineers Mangat, I.B. Patel & Partners, the main contractors were Laxmanbhai Construction and the services engineers for the project were Howard Humphreys (Kenya) Limited.

== Tenants ==
Spencon once had its head office here. It moved out of Rahimtulla in 2015, to Muguga, Kiambu County.
