= M-PESA =

Mobile banking service owned by Safaricom

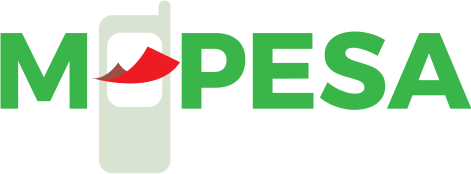
- Operating area: Kenya, Tanzania, Lesotho, DRC, Ghana, Mozambique, Egypt, Ethiopia.
- Members: Safaricom
- Founded: 2007
- Owner: Safaricom
- Website: www.m-pesa.africa

M-PESA ('M' for 'mobile', pesa is Swahili for 'money') is a mobile phone-based money transfer service, payments and micro-financing service, launched in 2007 by Vodafone and Safaricom, the largest mobile network operator in Kenya. It has since expanded to Tanzania, Mozambique, Democratic Republic of the Congo (DRC), Lesotho, Ghana, Egypt, and Ethiopia. The rollouts in India, Romania, and Albania were terminated amid low market uptake. M-PESA allows users to deposit, withdraw, transfer money, pay for goods and services (Lipa na M-PESA, Swahili for "Pay with M-PESA"), access credit and savings, all with a mobile device.

The service allows users to deposit money into an account stored on their cell phones, to send balances using PIN-secured SMS text messages to other users, including sellers of goods and services, and to redeem deposits for regular money. Users are charged a fee for sending and withdrawing money using the service.

M-PESA is a branchless banking service; M-PESA customers can deposit and withdraw money from a network of agents that includes airtime resellers and retail outlets acting as banking agents.

M-PESA spread quickly, and by 2010 had become the most successful mobile-phone-based financial service in the developing world. By 2012, a stock of about 17 million M-PESA accounts had been registered in Kenya. By June 2016, a total of 7 million M-PESA accounts had been opened in Tanzania by Vodacom. The service has been lauded for giving millions of people access to the formal financial system and for reducing crime in otherwise largely cash-based societies. However, the near-monopolistic providers of the M-PESA service are sometimes criticized for the high cost that the service imposes on its often poor users. For instance, M-PESA charges KES 29 to withdraw KES 300, translating to about 10% withdrawal fees.

== History ==
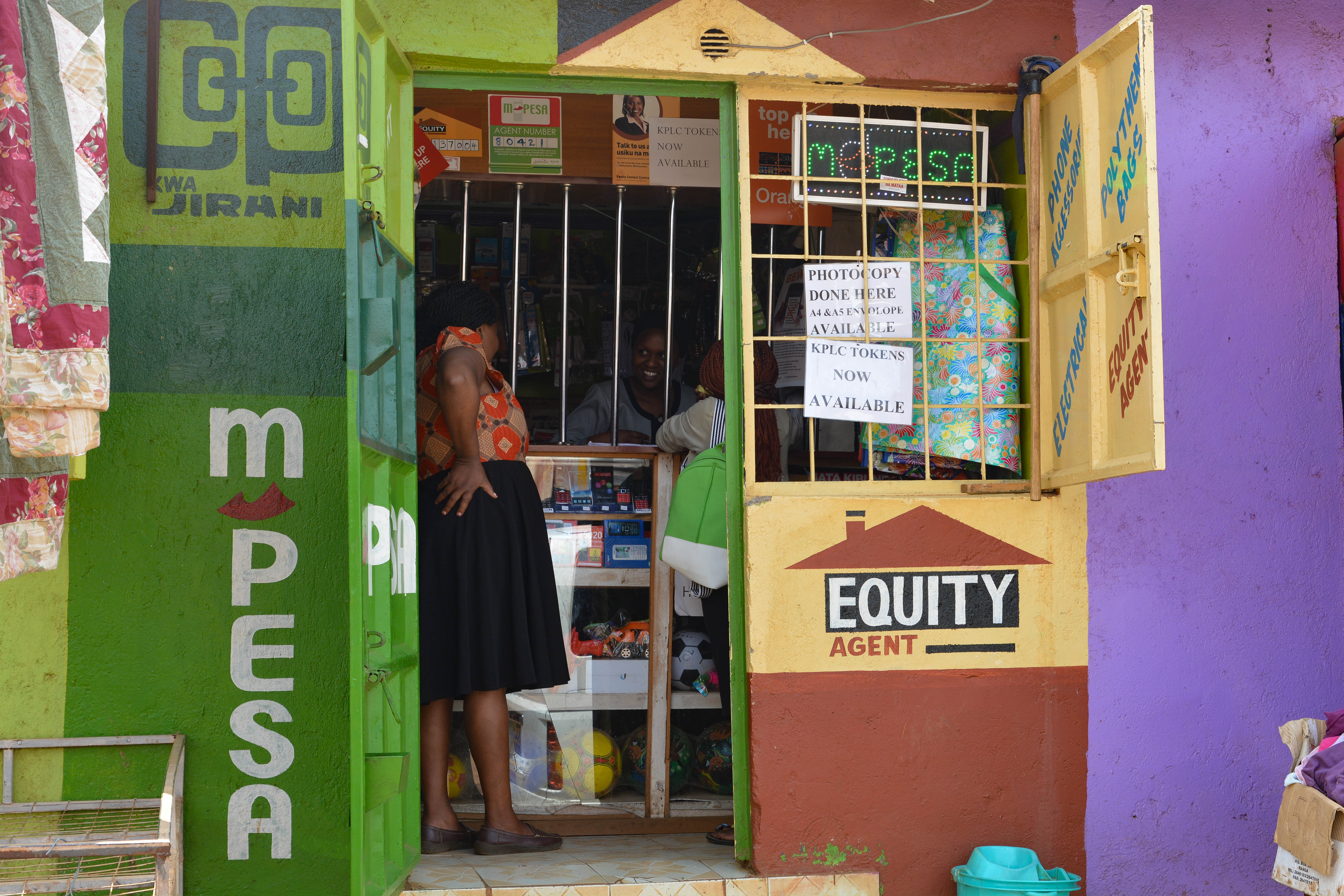
An M-PESA agent shop in Nairobi, Kenya. In such shops, customers can access most M-PESA services

Safaricom and Vodafone launched M-PESA, a mobile-based payment service targeting the un-banked, pre-pay mobile subscribers in Kenya on a pilot basis in October 2005. It was started as a public/private sector initiative after Vodafone was successful in winning funds from the Financial Deepening Challenge Fund competition established by the UK government's Department for International Development to encourage private sector companies to engage in innovative projects so as to deepen the provision of financial services in emerging economies.

The initial obstacle in the pilot was gaining the agent's trust and encouraging them to process cash withdrawals and agent training. However, once Vodafone introduced the ability to buy airtime using M-PESA, the transaction volume increased rapidly. A 5% discount was offered on any airtime purchased through M-PESA and this served as an effective incentive. By 1 March 2006, KSh50.7 million had been transferred through the system. The successful operation of the pilot was a key component in Vodafone and Safaricom's decision to take the product full scale. The learning from the pilot helped to confirm the market need for the service and although it mainly revolved around facilitating loan repayments and disbursements for Faulu customers, it also tested features such as airtime purchase and national remittance. The full commercial launch was initiated in March 2007.

A snapshot of the market then depicted that only a small percentage of people in Kenya used traditional banking services. There were low levels of bank income, high bank fees incurred and charged; most of the services were out of geographical reach to the rural Kenyan. Notably, a high level of mobile penetration was evident throughout the country making the adoption of mobile payments a viable alternative to the traditional banking channels. According to a survey done by CBS in 2005, Kenya then had over 5,970,600 people employed in the informal sector.

In 2002, researchers at Gamos and the Commonwealth Telecommunications Organisation, funded by the UK's Department for International Development (DFID), documented that in Uganda, Botswana and Ghana, people were using airtime as a proxy for money transfer. Kenyans were transferring airtime to their relatives or friends who were then using it or reselling it. Gamos researchers approached MCel in Mozambique, and in 2004 MCel introduced the first authorised airtime credit swapping – a precursor step towards M-PESA. The idea was discussed by the Commission for Africa and DFID introduced the researchers to Vodafone who had been discussing supporting microfinance and back office banking with mobile phones. S. Batchelor (Gamos) and N. Hughes (Vodafone CSR) discussed how a system of money transfer could be created in Kenya. DFID amended the terms of reference for its grant to Vodafone, and piloting began in 2005. Safaricom launched a new mobile phone-based payment and money transfer service, known as M-PESA.

The initial work of developing the product was given to a product and technology development company known as Sagentia. Development and second line support responsibilities were transferred to IBM in September 2009, where most of the original Sagentia team transferred to. Following a three-year migration project to a new technology stack, as of 26 February 2017, IBM's responsibilities have been transferred to Huawei in all markets.

=== Concept ===
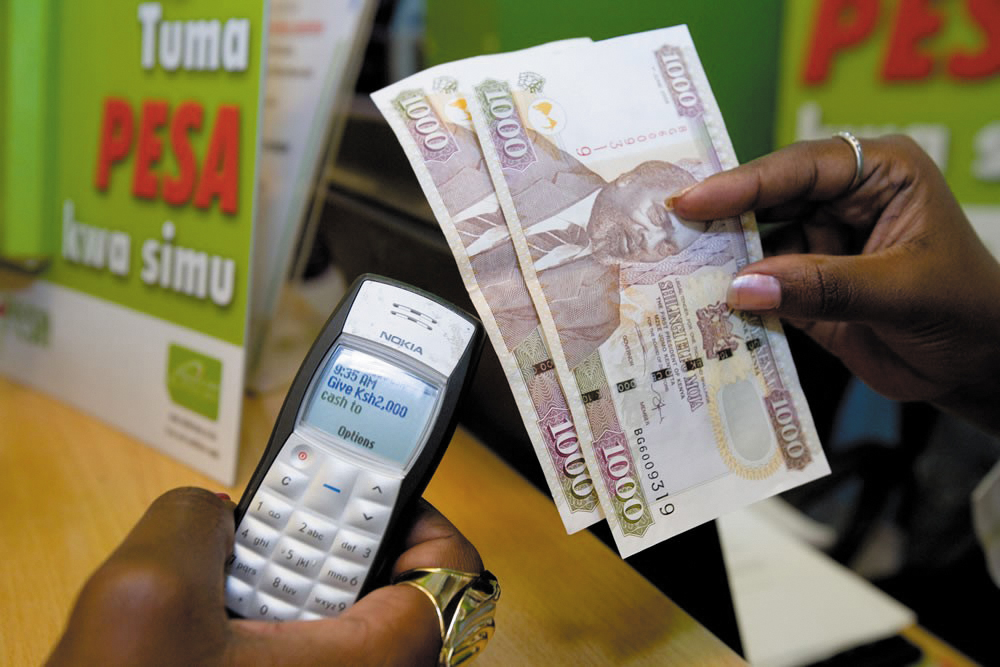
Image showing an individual using the M-PESA mobile money transfer.

The initial concept of M-PESA was to create a service which would allow microfinance borrowers to conveniently receive and repay loans using the network of Safaricom airtime resellers. This would enable microfinance institutions (MFIs) to offer more competitive loan rates to their users, as costs are lower than when dealing in cash. The users of the service would gain through being able to track their finances more easily. When the service was piloted, customers adopted the service for a variety of alternative uses and complications arose with Faulu, the partnering MFI. In discussion with other parties, M-PESA was re-focused and launched with a different value proposition: sending remittances home across the country and making payments.

== Services ==
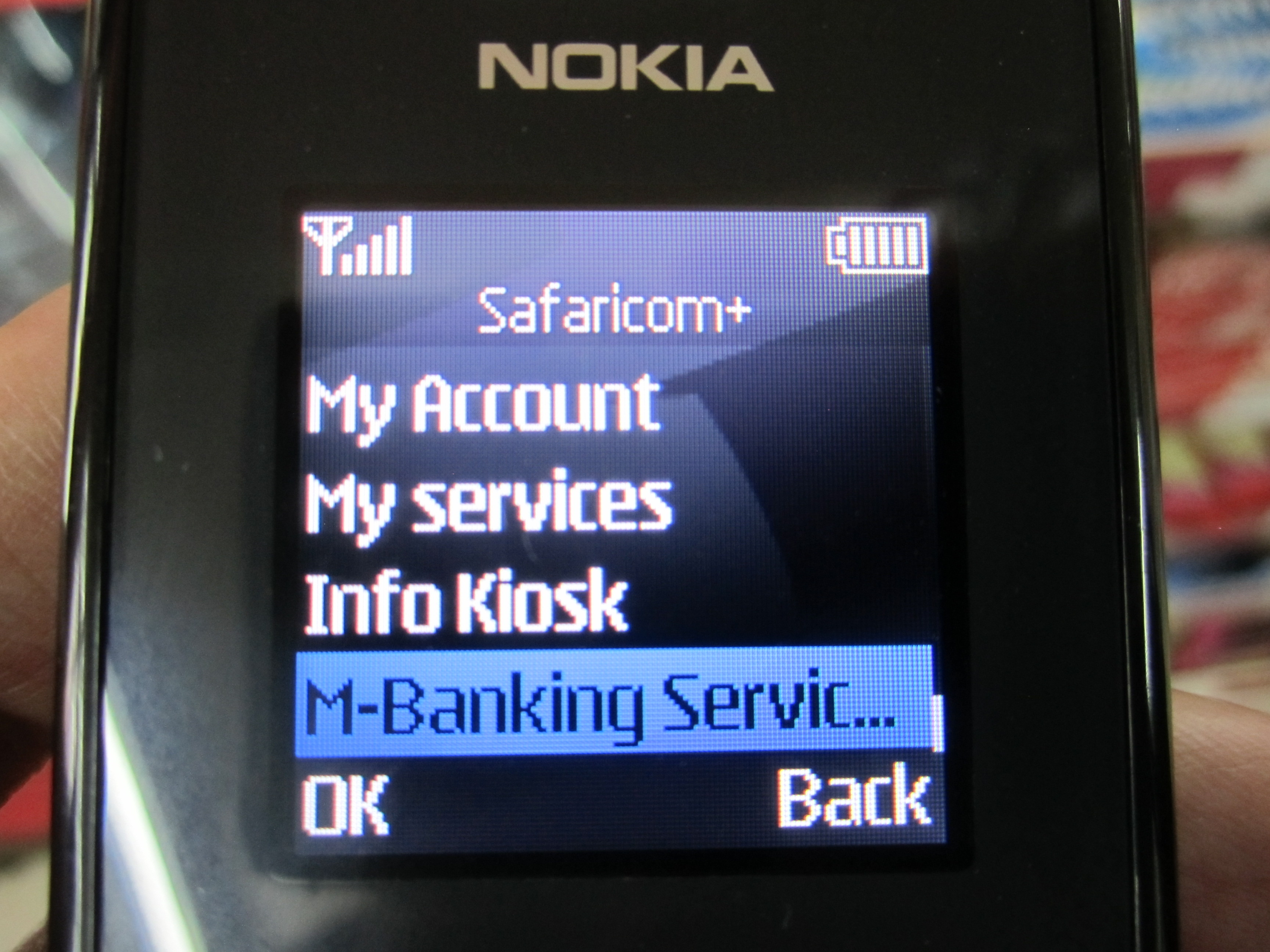
Safaricom's M-PESA service screen on a Nokia feature phone.

M-PESA is operated by Safaricom and Vodacom, mobile network operators (MNO) not classed as deposit-taking institutions, such as a bank. M-PESA customers can deposit and withdraw currency from a network of agents that includes airtime resellers and retail outlets acting as banking agents. The service enables its users to:

- deposit and withdraw local currency
- transfer currencies to other users
- pay bills
- purchase airtime
- save currency in a virtual account (Mshwari, Swahili for "calm")
- transfer currencies between the service and, in some markets like Kenya, a bank account
- borrow money to complete a transaction when short on cash (Fuliza, Swahili for "flush (with money)")
- Mobile loans - Mshwari

Partnerships with Kenyan banks offer expanded banking services like interest-bearing accounts, loans, and insurance.

The user interface technology of M-PESA differs between Safaricom of Kenya and Vodacom of Tanzania, although the underlying platform is the same. While Safaricom uses SIM toolkit (STK) to provide handset menus for accessing the service, Vodacom relies mostly on USSD to provide users with menus, but also supports STK.

== Cost, transaction charges, statistics ==
Transaction charges depend on the amount of money being transferred and whether the payee is a registered user of the service. The actual cost is a fixed amount for a given range of transaction sizes; for example Safaricom charges up to KSh66 (US$0.6) for a transaction to an unregistered user for transactions between KSh10 and KSh500 (US$0.92–US$4.56). For registered users the charge is KSh27 (US$0.25) or 5.4% to 27% for the same amount. At the highest transfer bracket of KSh50,001–70,000, the fee for a transfer to a registered user is KSh110 (US$1) or 0.16–0.22 %. The maximum amount that can be transferred to a non-registered user of the system is KSh35,000 (US$319.23), with a fee of KSh275 (US$2.51) or 0.8%. Cash withdrawal fees are also charged. With a charge of KSh10 (US$0.09) for a withdrawal of KSh50–100 or 10% to 20%, and up to KSh330 (US$3.01) for a withdrawal of KSh50,001–70,000 or 0.47% to 0.66%.

In an article published in 2015, Anja Bengelstorff cites the Central Bank of Kenya when she states that CHF 1 billion is moved in fiscal year 2014, with a profit of CHF 268 million, that is close to 27% of the moved money. In 2016, M-PESA moved KSh15 billion (US$147776845.14) per day, with a revenue of KSh41 billion. In 2017 KSh6,869 billion were moved according to a figure in Safaricoms own annual report, with a revenue of KSh55 billion. This would put Safaricom's profit ratio at around <1 % of total money transferred.

== Effect on poverty in Kenya ==
With the support of Financial Sector Deepening Kenya and the Bill & Melinda Gates Foundation, Tavneet Suri from the Massachusetts Institute of Technology and William Jack from Georgetown University have produced a series of papers extolling the benefits of M-PESA. In particular, their 2016 article published in Science has been influential in the international development community. The much cited result of the paper was that "access to M-PESA increased per capita consumption levels and lifted 194,000 households, or 2 % of Kenyan households, out of poverty." Global development institutions focusing on the development potential of financial technology frequently cite M-PESA as a major success story in this respect, citing the poverty-reduction claim and including a reference to Suri and Jack's 2016 signature article. In a report on "Financing for Development", the United Nations write: "The digitalization of finance offers new possibilities for greater financial inclusion and alignment with the 2030 Agenda for Sustainable Development and implementation of the Social Development Goals. In Kenya, the expansion of mobile money lifted two per cent of households in the country above the poverty line."

However, these findings on the role of M-PESA in reducing poverty have been contested in a 2019 paper, arguing that "Suri and Jack’s work contains so many serious errors, omissions, logical inconsistencies and flawed methodologies that it is actually correct to say that they have helped to catalyse into existence a largely false narrative surrounding the power of the fin-tech industry to advance the cause of poverty reduction and sustainable development in Africa (and elsewhere)".

== Markets ==
=== Kenya ===
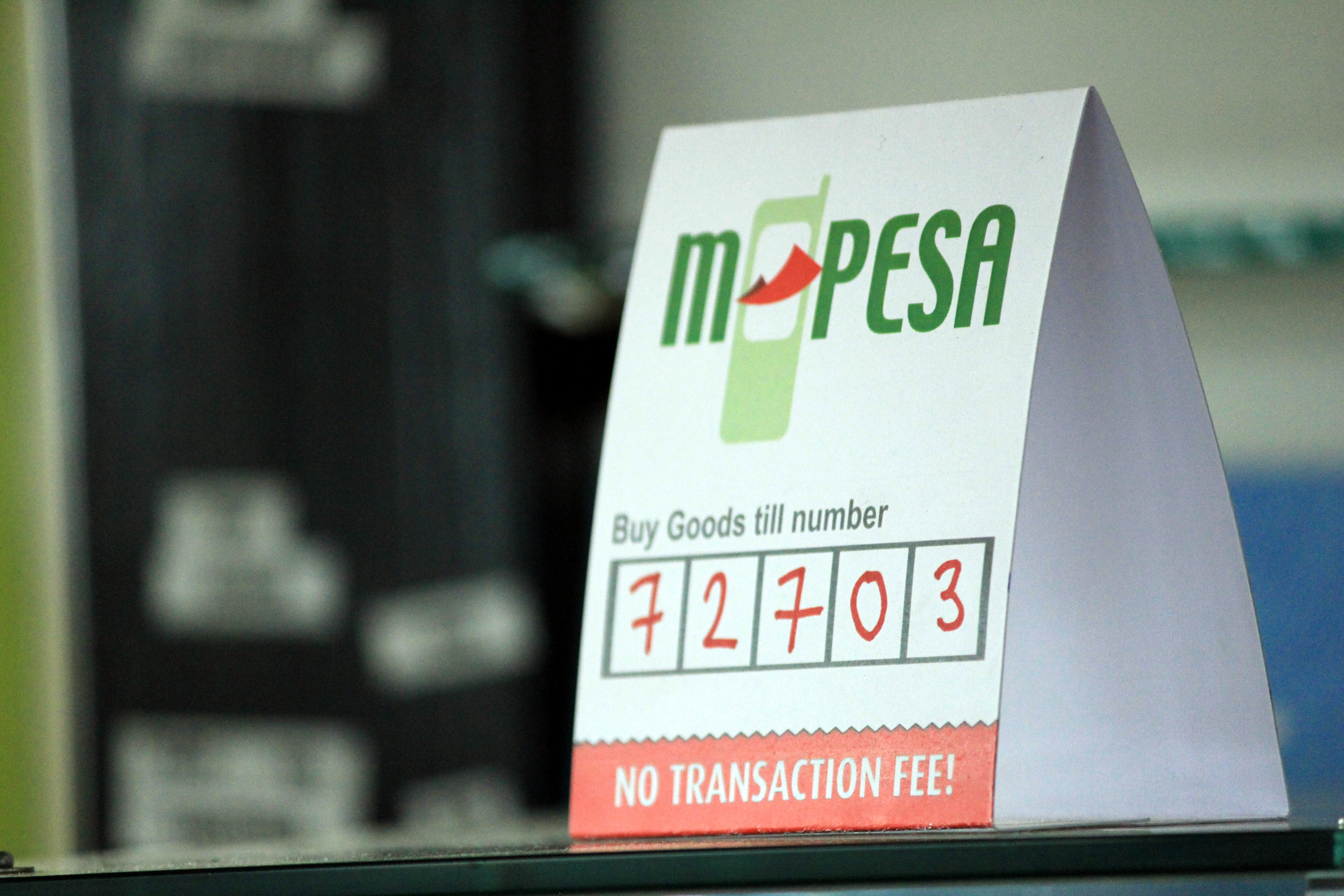
An M-PESA payment register at a Kenyan coffee shop

M-PESA was first launched by the Kenyan mobile network operator Safaricom, where Vodafone is technically a minority shareholder (40%), in March 2007. M-PESA quickly captured a significant market share for cash transfers, and grew to 17 million subscribers by December 2011 in Kenya alone.

The growth of the service forced formal banking institutions to take note of the new venture. In December 2008, a group of banks reportedly lobbied the Kenyan finance minister to audit M-PESA, in an effort to at least slow the growth of the service. This ploy failed, as the audit found that the service was robust. At this time the Banking Act did not provide a basis to regulate products offered by non-banks, of which M-PESA was one such very successful product. As at November 2014, M-PESA transactions for the 11 months of 2014 were valued at KSh2.1 trillion, a 28% increase from 2013, and almost half the value of the country's GDP.

On 19 November 2014, Safaricom launched a companion Android app, Safaricom M-Ledger for its M-Pesa users. The application, currently available only on Android, but as of now it's supported by iOS devices. The app gives M-PESA users a historical view of all their transactions. Many other companies business models rely on the M-PESA system in Kenya, such as M-kopa and SportPesa.

On 23 February 2018, it was reported that the Google Play store started taking payments for apps via Kenya's M-PESA service. On 8 January 2019, Safaricom launched Fuliza, an M-PESA overdraft facility.

=== Tanzania ===
M-PESA was launched in Tanzania by Vodacom in 2008 but its initial ability to attract customers fell short of expectations. In 2010, the International Finance Corporation released a report which explored many of these issues in greater depth and analyzed the strategic changes that Vodacom has implemented to improve their market position. As of May 2013, M-PESA in Tanzania had five million subscribers.

=== Afghanistan ===
In 2008, Vodafone partnered with Roshan, Afghanistan's primary mobile operator, to provide M-PESA, the local brand of the service. When the service was launched, it was initially used to pay policemen's salaries set to be competitive with what the Taliban were earning. Soon after the product was launched, the Afghan National Police found that under the previous cash model, 10% of their workforce were ghost police officers who did not exist; their salaries had been pocketed by others. When corrected in the new system, many police officers believed that they had received a raise or that there had been a mistake, as their salaries rose significantly. The National Police discovered that there was so much corruption when payments had been made using the previous model that the policemen did not know their true salary. The service was so successful that it was expanded to include limited merchant payments, peer-to-peer transfers, loan disbursements and payments.

=== South Africa ===
In September 2010, Vodacom and Nedbank announced the launch of the service in South Africa, where there were estimated to be more than 13 million "economically active" people without a bank account. M-PESA has been slow to gain a toehold in the South African market compared to Vodacom's projections that it would sign up 10 million users in the following three years. By May 2011, it had registered approximately 100,000 customers. The gap between expectations for M-PESA's performance and its actual performance can be partly attributed to differences between the Kenyan and South African markets, including the banking regulations at the time of M-PESA's launch in each country.

According to MoneyWeb, a South African investment website, "A tough regulatory environment with regards to customer registration and the acquisition of outlets also compounded the company's troubles, as the local regulations are more stringent in comparison to our African counterparts. Lack of education and product understanding also hindered efforts in the initial roll out of the product." In June 2011, Vodacom and Nedbank launched a campaign to re-position M-PESA, targeting the product to potential customers who have a higher Living Standard Measures (LSM) than were first targeted.

Despite efforts, as at March 2015, M-PESA still struggled to grow its customer base. South Africa lags behind Tanzania and Kenya with only ca. 1 million subscribers. This comes as no surprise as South Africa is well known for being ahead of financial institutions globally in terms of maturity and technological innovation. According to Genesis Analytics, 70% of South Africans are "banked", meaning that they have at least one bank account with an established financial institution which have their own banking products which directly compete with the M-PESA offering.

=== India ===
M-PESA was launched in India as a close partnership with ICICI bank in November 2011. Development for the bank began as early as 2008. Vodafone India had partnered with both ICICI and ICICI bank, ICICI launched M-Pesa on 18 April 2013. Vodafone had planned to roll out this service throughout India. The user needed to register for this service, registration was free and there were charges levied per M-PESA transaction for money transfer services and DTH and Prepaid recharges could be done through M-PESA for free.

M-PESA was shut down from 15 July 2019 due to regulatory curbs and stress in the sector, with Vodafone surrendering their PPI licence on 1 October 2019.

=== Europe ===
In March 2014, M-PESA expanded into Romania, while mentioning that it may continue to expand elsewhere into Eastern Europe, as a number of individuals there possess mobile phones but do not possess traditional bank accounts. As of May 2014, however, it was considered unlikely that the service would expand into Western Europe anytime soon. In December 2017, Vodafone closed its M-PESA product in Romania.

In May 2015, M-PESA was also launched in Albania. It was shut down on 14 July 2017.

=== Other markets ===
M-PESA expanded into Mozambique, Lesotho, and Egypt in May, June, and July 2013, respectively. A full listing of countries in which M-PESA currently operates can be found on M-Pesa's website.

== Regulation and KYC rules ==
M-PESA sought to engage Kenyan regulators and keep them updated on the development process. M-PESA also reached out to international regulators, such as the UK's Financial Conduct Authority (FCA) and the payment card industry to understand how best to protect client information and adhere to internationally recognized best practices.

Know your customer (KYC) requirements impose obligations on prospective clients and on banks to collect identification documents of clients and then to have those documents verified by banks. The Kenyan government issues national identity cards that M-PESA leveraged in their business processes to satisfy their KYC requirements.

M-PESA obtained a "special" license from regulators, despite concerns by regulators about non-branch banking adding to the current state of financial instability.

== Third-party integration ==
Safaricom released the new M-PESA platform dubbed M-PESA G2 to offer versatile integration capabilities for development partners.

Client-to-business and business-to-client disbursements are some of features available through the API.

== Criticism ==
The near-monopolistic providers of the M-PESA service are sometimes criticized for the high cost that the service imposes on its often poor users. The Bill and Melinda Gates Foundation warned in 2013 that lack of competition could drive up prices for customers of mobile money services and used M-PESA in Kenya as an example. According to the Foundation, a transfer of $1.50 cost $0.30 at the time, while the same provider charged only a tenth of this in neighboring Tanzania, where it was exposed to more competition.

A study sponsored by USAID found that poor uneducated customers, who often had bad vision, were a target of unfair practices within M-PESA. They had expensive subscriptions for ring-tones and similar unnecessary services pushed on them, with opaque pricing, and thus did not understand why their M-PESA deposits depleted so quickly. If they did, they were often unable to unsubscribe from those services without help. The authors concluded that it is not the marginalized people in Kenya who benefit from M-PESA, but mostly Safaricom.

A similar conclusion was reached by development economist Alan Gibson in a study commissioned by Financial Sector Deepening Trust Kenya (FSD Kenya) on the occasion of the 10th anniversary of FSD Kenya in 2016. He wrote that credit to business did not improve due to M-PESA and that credit to the agricultural sector even declined. He concluded in his otherwise very friendly survey that the financial sector benefitted handsomely from the expansion of M-PESA, while the living conditions of the people were not noticeably improved.

Milford Bateman et al. even conclude that M-PESA's expansion resulted in holding back economic development in Kenya. They diagnose serious weaknesses in the much cited paper by Suri and Jack, which had found positive effects on poverty, as M-PESA enabled female clients to move out of subsistence agriculture into micro-enterprise or small-scale trading activities. Alleged weaknesses include a failure to incorporate business failures and crowding out of competitors in the analysis. Bateman et al. call M-Pesa an extractive activity, by which large profits are created from taxing small-scale payments, which would be free if cash was used instead. As a large part of these profits are sent abroad to foreign shareholders of Safaricom, local spending power and demand are reduced, and with it the development potential for local enterprise.

Kenya does not have a data protection law, which enables Safaricom to use sensitive data of its subscribers rather freely. A data scandal surfaced in 2019 when Safaricom was sued in court for the alleged breach of data privacy of an estimated 11.5 million subscribers who had used their Safaricom numbers for sports betting. The data was allegedly offered on the black market.

== See also ==
- Digital currency

== Bibliography ==
- Mas, Ignacio; Morawczynski, Olga (2009). "Designing Mobile Money Services: Lessons from M-PESA". Innovations: Technology, Governance, Globalization. 4 (2): 77–91. doi:10.2139/ssrn.1552753. ISSN 1556-5068. S2CID 154328190.
- Morawczynski, Olga; Miscione, Gianluca (2008). "Examining trust in mobile banking transactions: The case of M-PESA in Kenya". Social Dimensions of Information and Communication Technology Policy. IFIP International Federation for Information Processing. Vol. 282. pp. 287–298. doi:10.1007/978-0-387-84822-8_19. ISBN 978-0-387-84821-1. ISSN 1571-5736.
- Morawczynski, O. (2008). "Surviving in the 'Dual System': How M-PESA is Fostering Urban-to-Rural Remittances in a Kenyan Slum" HCC8 Conference. Pretoria, South Africa.
- Omwansa, T. (2009). "M-Pesa: Progress and Prospects" innovations / Mobile World Congress 2009. Pg 107-123. (PDF)
