= 88 Nairobi Condominium Tower =

Residential skyscraper in Nairobi, Kenya

88 Nairobi Condominium

General information
- Status: Under construction
- Type: Residential Space
- Location: Upper Hill, Nairobi, Kenya
- Coordinates: 01°17′41″S 36°48′31″E
- Groundbreaking: Feb 2018
- Opening: 2026
- Cost: Sh5 billion (Est)

Height
- Roof: 150 m (492 ft)

Technical details
- Floor count: 48
- Grounds: 1.0 acre (0.40 ha)

Design and construction
- Architect: MSA Mimarlik Architects (Turkey)
- Developer: Lordship Africa

Website
- www.88nairobi.com

88 Nairobi Condominium is a 48-storey residential skyscraper under construction in the Upper Hill neighbourhood of Nairobi, the capital and largest city of Kenya. When completed it is expected to become the tallest residential structure in Sub Saharan Africa.

== Location ==
The building would be located on a 1 acre (4,000 m^{2}) plot of land, along Fourth Ngong Avenue, in the Upper Hill neighbourhood of Nairobi, approximately 3.5 kilometres (2 mi), south-west of the city's central business district.

== Overview ==
The 88 Nairobi Condominium is owned by Lordship Africa, a real estate investment and development firm, based in Nairobi. The firm, is a subsidiary of the Lordship Group, a real estate conglomerate, headquartered in Central Europe.

The development is expected to provide over 15,000 square feet (1,394 m^{2}) of rentable residential space and approximately 18,000 square feet (1,672 m^{2}) of garden space.

== Amenities ==
Other amenities include a convenience store, a 150-seat branded restaurant, Spa and Gym, Meeting and Business centre, Three resident Bars, Lavish Communal Lounge, a heated indoor swimming pool on the 31st floor, and parking space for 518 vehicles. There will be a total of 288 luxury condominiums in the development.

There are four apartment plans in the building: (a) the one-bedroom executive plan (b) the two-bedroom executive-plus plan (c) Duplex, and (d) the penthouse plans, of three and four bedrooms, available on the 40th floor and above. All units will be fully furnished.

== Target clientele ==
The target clientele is the estimated 40,000 executives and corporate employees working in the Upper Hill neighbourhood, which lacked executive residential apartments, as of February 2018.

The development would cut down on commute times and reduce the use of motorized transportation, as some executives might choose to walk to and from work.

== Construction & Funding ==
The construction budget is set at KSh5 billion (approx. US$50 million), raised through, debt, equity, and unit sales.

Construction kicked off in 2018, with completion approximated for 2023. The completion was then postponed to the first quarter of 2025. This was attributed to manifold construction and material stocking issues.

== See also ==
- List of tallest buildings in Nairobi
- List of tallest buildings in Africa
