= Hazina Towers =

Building in Nairobi, Kenya

- Interactive map of the Hazina Towers area

General information
- Status: Completed
- Type: Commercial
- Location: Moktar Daddah Street; Nairobi, Kenya
- Coordinates: 1.282491°S 36.815562°E
- Construction started: 1997; 29 years ago
- Completed: December 31, 2019; 6 years ago
- Owner: NSSF Kenya

Technical details
- Floor count: 15 (39 originally planned)

Design and construction
- Architects: Mruttu and Salman Associates
- Main contractor: China Jiangxi International

Hazina Towers, also Hazina Trading Centre, is a building under construction in Nairobi, the capital and largest city in Kenya. The building was originally planned to be 39 storeys tall.

== Location ==
The building is located at Moktar Daddah Street in the central business district of Nairobi. The coordinates of the building are:1°16'57.0"S, 36°48'56.0"E (Latitude:−1.282491; Longitude:36.815562).

== Overview ==
Hazina Towers is owned by National Social Security Fund (NSSF). In 1997 construction began, with the plan to lease the completed building and generate income for the pension fund. Due to financial difficulties, construction stalled at eight stories. In 2003 NSSF leased the eight-storey structure to Nakumatt, a local supermarket chain.

In 2013, following protracted legal challenges, China Jiangxi International was contracted to resume construction by adding 31 new stories to the existing structure. The total cost of the project is budgeted at KSh6.7 billion (approx. US$67.3 million). When complete, rental income is projected at about KSh100 million (approx. US$1 million) per month. The Kenyan Parliament is considering leasing space in the building for its members.

- Note: US$1.00 = KSh99.62, on 31 March 2016.

== New developments ==
In the period between June 2013 and March 2018, the management of the NSSF Kenya decided to change the building size from 39 floors to 15. As of March 2018, construction was still progressing, although the cost of the smaller tower of 15 floors was not publicly known. In December 2017, NSSF Kenya, the owners of the owners of the building, evicted Nakumatt from the development, for non-payment of rent, with arrears amounting to KSh73 million (approx. US$730,000).

In January 2020, the high rise completion was valued at a total investment of KSh4,095,862,434 (approx. US$41 million), for the 15-storey structure. This compares with the projected cost of KSh6,715,218,188 (approx. US$67.3 million), for the 39-level structure originally planned. The savings amount to KSh2,619,355,754 (approx. US$26.3 million).

== See also ==
- List of tallest buildings in Nairobi
- Nairobi County
