= Abcon Complex & Towers =

Coordinates: 01°17′39″S 36°48′55″E

General information
- Type: Commercial
- Location: Upper Hill; Nairobi; Kenya
- Construction started: 2016 (Expected)
- Completed: 2020 (Expected)

Height
- Top floor: 110 m (360 ft)

Technical details
- Floor count: 35

Abcon Complex & Towers is a planned building complex in Nairobi, Kenya's capital and largest city.

== Location ==
The building complex would sit on 3.57 acres (1.44 ha), in the Upper Hill neighborhood of Nairobi, the capital and largest city in the country, approximately 3.7 kilometres (2.3 mi), southwest of the city's central business district. The skyscraper would lie at the junction of Haile Selassie Avenue and Lower Hill Road. The coordinates of the proposed building are: 1°17'39.0"S, 36°48'55.0"E (Latitude:-1.294153; Longitude:36.815265).

== Overview ==
The development would consist of (a) an 18-floor hotel (b) residential apartments occupying 17 floors (c) office space on 22 floors (d) parking space for 1,320 vehicles (e) an amphitheater and (f) retail space on three floors.

== Construction costs ==
The budgeted construction cost is KSh5.52 billion (approx. US$55.5 million). Note:US$1.00 = KSh99.46 on 26 April 2016.

== Ownership ==
The development is owned by a consortium of seven investors, under the service vehicle called Greenfield Developers Limited. The shareholding in the project is as depicted in the table below:

Greenfield Developers Limited Stock Ownership
Rank	Name of Owner	Percentage Ownership
1	Abcon International LLC	62.60
2	Signature Development Limited	18.00
3	HassConsult	8.60
4	Elise Adan	2.60
5	Jayesh Saini	0.66
6	Others	7.54
	Total	100.00

== See also ==
- List of tallest buildings in Nairobi
- Nairobi
