= Muguga =

Settlement in Kiambu County, Kenya

- Location within Kenya
- Coordinates: 1.18°S 36.65°E
- Country: Kenya
- Province: Kiambu County
- Time zone: UTC+3 (EAT)

Muguga is a settlement in Kenya's Kiambu County, formerly in Central Province.

It is the location of a Veterinary Research Centre.

== Economy ==
Spencon had a headquarters in Muguga. The offices were in prefabricated buildings formerly used as workshops. The property also had a golf facility installed after July 2015. The headquarters moved there in 2015 as a cost-cutting measure, away from Rahimtulla Tower in Upper Hill, Nairobi.
