= Peter Mwangi =

Kenyan accountant, engineer, and business executive

- Born: Peter Mwangi; 1970 (age 55–56); Kenya
- Education: University of Nairobi (Bachelor of Science in Electrical Engineering); Certified Public Accountants of Kenya (Certified Public Accountant)
- Occupations: Engineer, Accountant & Business executive
- Years active: 2000 – present
- Title: Group Managing Director & UAP Old Mutual Group

Peter King'ori Mwangi is an electrical engineer, accountant and business executive in Kenya. He is the current [Managing Director|Group Managing Director] of the UAP Old Mutual Group, the financial services conglomerate, based in Kenya, with subsidiaries in six African countries.

== Background and education ==
He was born in present-day Nyeri County, Kenya circa 1970, and attended Kenyan schools for his pre-university education. He obtained a Bachelor of Science in electrical engineering, from the University of Nairobi, graduating in 1993. He is also a certified public accountant and a chartered financial analyst. He a member of the Institute of Certified Public Secretaries of Kenya (ICPSK).

== Career ==
He joined the Kenya Air Force (KAF) at the rank of Lieutenant and a job assignment of a Technical Officer. His job included the development of an ICT strategy and the maintenance of the avionic communication systems at the KAF. He worked there for five years, during which time he was promoted to the rank of Captain.

From 2000 until 2004, he served as Company Secretary and investment manager at ICDC Investment Company Limited, the precursor to Centum Investments. Having served as Acting Managing Director from 2004 until December 2004, Peter Mwangi was confirmed as managing director at the company in December 2004. He continued in his role as the CEO, managing director and investment manager, until 15 October 2008. During his tenure, the company re-branded to "Centum Investment Company Limited'.

When he left Centum, he joined the Nairobi Securities Exchange (NSE), as the chief executive officer in November 2008. His contract was renewed in 2011 but he had to leave the NSE in 2014, because the law allows for a maximum of two consecutive tree-year terms. During his tenure at NSE, the shares of stock of the exchange, were demutualised and sold to the public.

In October 2014, he was appointed the CEO at Old Mutual Kenya, a subsidiary of Old Mutual, the international financial services conglomerate, with headquarters in London, United Kingdom. In June 2015, when Old Mutual decided to merge all its businesses in Kenya under one roof, Peter Mwangi was selected to be the Group Chief Executive of UAP Old Mutual Group.

== See also ==
- UAP Holdings
- Old Mutual
- Faulu Kenya

== Other responsibilities ==
Peter King'ori Mwangi sits on the boards of the following public and private enterprises: 1. UAP Old Mutual Insurance Sudan Limited. 2. Kisii Bottlers Limited 3. Mount Kenya Bottlers Limited 4. Rift Valley Bottlers Limited 5. Eveready Batteries Limited 6. KWAL Holdings Limited 7. Central Depository & Settlement Corporation Limited 8. Funguo Investments Limited. 9. British American Tobacco Kenya Limited 10. Wildlife Works Inc.
