= Shelter Afrique =

African housing finance organization

Shelter Afrique Development Bank
- Type: Private
- Industry: Finance
- Founded: 1982; 44 years ago
- Headquarters: Longonot Road, Upper Hill, Nairobi, Kenya
- Key people: Chii P. Akporji (Chairperson); Thierno-Habib Hann(Managing Director & CEO)
- Products: Project finance, institutional lending, equity investments, trade finance & social housing
- Revenue: ▲US$100,983 (2023)
- Total assets: US$ 224.28 million (2023)
- Owner: 44 African Governments; AfDB; Africa Re; African Solidarity Fund
- Number of employees: 55 (2023)
- Website: www.shelterafrique.org

Shelter Afrique Development Bank (ShafDB), also known as Company for Habitat and Housing in Africa, is a pan-African finance development bank created to exclusively support the development of the African real estate and housing sector. Through its strategic partnerships, it offers products and related services which support the efficient delivery of commercial real estate and affordable housing.

== Location ==
The main offices of the organisation are located at Shelter Afrique Centre on Longonot Road, Upper Hill, in Nairobi, the capital of Kenya. The organisation also has two regional offices: one in Abuja, Nigeria's capital city at 1129, Muhktar El-Yakub's Place, Central Business District; and another in Abidjan, Côte d’Ivoire, located at Riviera 3, Carrefour Mel Theodore, Boulevard Arsène Usher Assouan.

== History ==
Shelter Afrique was established by a Constituent Charter in 1982 and incorporated in Kenya under the Shelter-Afrique Act, chapter 493C of the Laws of Kenya. Operations begun officially in 1985.

== Overview ==
As of December 2023, Shelter Afrique, being a supranational development financial institution had total assets valued at approximately US$224.26 million, and shareholders' equity of US$166.01 million. Besides using its own funds, SAf collaborates with other financial institutions which provide funding for onward lending in the real estate and housing arena within the continent. Partner funding sources include: (a) Netherlands Development Finance Company (b) French Development Agency (c) European Investment Bank and (d) Commercial Bank of Africa. SAf also works in collaboration with several international organizations with similar objectives, namely: 1. International Union of Housing Finance (IUHF) 2. Centre for Affordable Housing Finance in Africa (CAHF) and 3. UN Habitat for A Better Urban Future (UN-Habitat).

== Membership ==
Shelter Afrique's current shareholding comprises 44 African member countries ("Class A" Shareholders) plus three institutions; the African Development Bank (AfDB), the African Reinsurance Corporation (Africa-Re) and the African Solidarity Fund (FSA)

== Shareholders ==
The organization has 44 member African countries and two African financial multinational institutions:

- AfDB
- Algeria
- Benin
- Botswana
- Burkina-Faso
- Burundi
- Cameroon
- Cape Verde
- CAR
- Chad
- Congo
- Eswatini
- Djibouti
- DRC
- Equatorial Guinea
- Gabon
- Gambia
- Ghana
- Guinea
- Guinea-Bissau
- Ivory Coast
- Kenya
- Liberia
- Lesotho
- Madagascar
- Malawi
- Mali
- Mauritania
- Mauritius
- Morocco
- Namibia
- Niger
- Nigeria
- Rwanda
- São Tomé and Príncipe
- Senegal
- Seychelles
- Sierra Leone
- Somalia
- Tanzania
- Togo
- Tunisia
- Uganda
- Zambia
- Zimbabwe

== Governance ==
As of July 2026 the Chairman of the Board of Directors is Dr Chii P. Akporji a national of Nigeria. In August 2022, Thierno Habib Hann, a national of Guinea was confirmed as head of Shelter Afrique, replacing Zimbabwean Andrew Chimphondah.

== Accreditations ==
=== ISO Certification ===
Shelter Afrique received ISO (International Organization for Standardization) 9001:2015 certification for Quality Management Systems from Bureau Veritas Certification Holding SAS (UK Branch), accredited by United Kingdom Accreditation Service (UKAS) Management System.

This certification was issued in 2020, is valid for three years until 2023, and supports strengthening of the institution’s governance framework.

=== Bloomfield Rating ===
Shelter Afrique retained its Bloomfield Long Term Credit Rating at BBB+, which was issued in 2020.

== See also ==
- Common Market for Eastern and Southern Africa
- PTA Bank
- African Development Bank
- East African Development Bank
