= Victoria Commercial Bank =

Coordinates: 01°18′03″S 36°48′56″E

Victoria Commercial Bank Limited
- Type: Private
- Industry: Financial services
- Founded: 1987 (age 38–39)
- Headquarters: Nairobi, Kenya
- Key people: Seth Ketaki (chairman); Yogesh K Pattni (managing director)
- Products: Loans, checking, savings, investments, debit cards
- Revenue: ▲Aftertax: US$4.5 million (KES:649.48 million) (2022)
- Total assets: US$360.3 million (KES:52.08 billion) (2022)
- Number of employees: 110 (2023)
- Website: Homepage

Victoria Commercial Bank (VCB) is a private bank in Kenya. It is licensed as a commercial bank, by the Central Bank of Kenya, the Central Bank and national banking regulator.

== Location ==
The bank maintains five branches in Nairobi, Kenya's capital. The main branch is located at Victoria Towers, in the upscale neighborhood of Upper Hill, about 4.6 kilometres (3 mi) southwest of the central business district of Nairobi, Kenya's capital city.

== History ==
Victoria Commercial Bank was established in 1987 as Victoria Finance Company, a non-bank finance institution (NBFI). In 1996, following the issuance of a banking license by the Central Bank of Kenya, the company rebranded to Victoria Commercial Bank.

== Overview ==
The bank is a Tier III private bank in Kenya, East Africa's largest economy. VCB focuses on serving large corporations and high-net-worth clients. The bank also offers personal banking services to the employees of its corporate clients. Later, it began making loans to qualifying small and medium enterprises (SMEs).

As of December 2022, the bank's total assets were valued at about US$360.3 million (KES:52.08 billion), with shareholders' equity of about US$49.4 million (KES:7.32 billion).

== Ownership ==
As of January 2017, the shareholding in the stock of Victoria Commercial Bank was as follows:

Victoria Commercial Bank stock ownership
Rank	Name of owner	Percentage ownership
1	Kanji D. Pattni	13.02
2	Kingsway Investments	8.96
2	Orchid Holdings	8.33
2	Rochester Holdings	7.13
2	74 others	62.56
	Total	100.00

== Branches ==
As of July 2016, Victoria Commercial Bank maintains five branches in the city of Nairobi, Kenya.

== Credit rating ==
In July 2016, the South African credit rating agency Global Credit Ratings (GCR) rated the bank as BBB with a stable outlook. The bank has a history of "operating without a loan default for the last 10 years". During the first six months of 2017, VCB declared its first non-performing loan in the previous 10 years. The defaulted loan is valued at KSh18.3 million. (approx. US$180,000).

== See also ==
- List of banks in Kenya
- Economy of Kenya
