= Kenya Commercial Bank Plaza =

Building in Nairobi, Kenya

- Interactive map of the Kenya Commercial Bank Plaza area

General information
- Type: Commercial
- Location: Upper Hill; Nairobi; Kenya
- Coordinates: 1.3017°S 36.8129°E
- Construction started: 2010
- Completed: 2015

Height
- Top floor: 99 m (325 ft)

Technical details
- Floor count: 21
- Floor area: 228,330 ft^{2} (21,213 m^{2})

Design and construction
- Architect: Planning Systems Services

Kenya Commercial Bank Plaza (KCB Plaza) is a building in Nairobi, the capital and largest city of Kenya. Construction began in December 2010 and the building was completed in 2015.

== Location ==
The skyscraper is located in Upper Hill, approximately 2.5 kilometres (2 mi), by road, south-west of the central business district of Nairobi, the capital city of Kenya. The coordinates of the building are: 1° 18' 0.00"S, 36° 48' 48.00"E (Latitude:-1.300000; Longitude:36.813333).

== Overview ==
KCB Plaza has twenty-one storeys consisting of approximately 171,800 square feet (15,961 m^{2}) of rentable office space and enough parking for about four hundred and fifty automobiles. Construction began in December 2010, and was originally expected to last two years. However, multiple delays put the building's construction behind of schedule until its completion in July 2015, approximately 30 months behind schedule.

== Construction costs ==
The building is owned by the Kenya Commercial Bank Employee Pension Fund, who are footing the US$26 million (KES:2.1 billion) construction bill. In April 2012, Kenyan press reports indicated that the rentable space inside the building had been increased to 228,330 square feet (21,213 m^{2}). KCB Plaza was expected to be one of the tallest skyscrapers in Nairobi at the time of its completion.

The main contractor was China Wu Yi Company Limited. ARUP' was the environmental design engineers. Kenya Commercial Bank Group is the main tenant. The building is fitted with solar panels to supplement the power from the national grid. It also has the ability to harvest and treat rain water for use in the building. It is also fitted with water recycling capability, thereby reducing the cost of running the skyscraper.

== See also ==
- Kenya Commercial Bank Group
- List of banks in Kenya
- List of tallest buildings in Nairobi

== Photos and diagrams ==
- Artist's Impression of KCB Plaza At Nation.co.ke
- Photo at Nairobiwire.com
