= Development Bank of the Central African States =

African multilateral development bank

- Banque de développement des États de l'Afrique centrale (BDEAC)
- Established: 1975
- Type: Multilateral development bank
- Legal status: International financial institution
- Headquarters: Brazzaville, Republic of the Congo
- President: Dieudonné Evou Mekou

The Development Bank of the Central African States, usually known for its French initials, BDEAC, is a multilateral development bank that is charged with financing the development of the member states of Economic and Monetary Community of Central Africa (CEMAC). The BDEAC is different from the Bank of the Central African States (BEAC), which is a central bank.

The bank is dominated by authoritarian governments and is known to provide funds to help authoritarian regimes that face threats to their survival. A prominent example includes how the DEAC financed Michel Djotodia during the Central African Republic (CAR) civil war in 2013.

== History ==
BDEAC was created through an agreement signed in Bangui on December 3, 1975, in Bangui by the heads of state of Cameroon, Central African Republic, Republic of the Congo and Gabon. It started its operations on January 3, 1977.

Since 2006, the BDEAC has been actively involved in financing the development of the Pointe-Noire port, and in March 2012, it allocated 130 billion CFA francs for various projects, including two cement plants in Congo and Cameroon and a hospital in Equatorial Guinea. BDEAC significantly bolstered its financial base in July 2014 by increasing its share capital by 250 billion CFA francs to a total of 1,200 billion CFA francs, and in 2016, received an additional 400 billion CFA francs from the Bank of Central African States (BEAC).

In April 2017, BDEAC set forth a strategic plan for 2017-2021 focusing on agricultural projects to cut down on expensive agri-food imports in the CEMAC zone, and in July of the same year, the Kingdom of Morocco invested 4 million dollars for a 3% stake in BDEAC, gaining a seat on the board of directors. Furthering its commitment to the region's development, on January 25, 2020, BDEAC signed a partnership agreement with the African Solidarity Fund (FSA) to enhance financing for investments and significantly boost FSA's role in the Central African region.

== Leadership ==
The General Assembly is BDEAC's supreme organ. The Bank is led by a president elected by the General Assembly for a single five year term. This president is assisted by a vice president elected under the same conditions. Since 2022, the president is Dieudonné Evou Mekou.

== Finances ==
In 2017, Moroccan government acquired an equity investment of the BDEAC worth €10 billion. The deal was signed in Rabat by Mohamed Boussaid and the bank's vice president, Zounguere Sokambi Armand Guy. On July 26, 2017, the Arab Bank for Economic Development in Africa financed the BDEAC $15 million as part of a financing program. Also in 2017, the BDEAC gave $3 million to fund members of CEMAC.

In 2018, the BDEAC collaborated with the Nigerian Export-Import Bank to promote regional trade and investment.
