= Spencon =

Former construction company

Spencor Services Ltd.
- Type: Building and Development
- Founded: 1979/10

Spencon Services Ltd. was a construction company headquartered in Nairobi, Kenya.

== History ==
The company was established by Jitendra Chhotabhai Patel. In September 1979 incorporation occurred.

In addition to its business in Kenya, began operating in Tanzania and Uganda, India, and Zambia in circa 1984–1985, 1988, and 1994, respectively. It also had operations in Malawi, Mozambique, and Southern Sudan.

When the company was at its largest, its workforce numbered 5,000. Joel Gunter and Charles Young of the BBC stated that it was "one of the largest construction firms in East Africa."

According to court testimony from Patel, Emerging Capital Partners (ECP) invested KSh. 1.5 billion (US$15 million) into the company and used it to take 37.4% of the company in 2009 by changing the money into ordinary shares.

By early 2014 the company had been experiencing financial issues, so ECP assumed control of the company and appointed Briton Andrew Ross to help turn around the company in November of that year; ECP brought on Briton Steven Haswell in April the following year. Gunter and Young stated that "By the middle of 2016, Spencon was on its knees." In November 2016 the company collapsed, with Gunter and Young stated that it resulted in "hundreds of Kenyans out of work, some already missing months of pay." An additional 110 Kenyans were laid off by January 2017.

In 2017 Patel sued ECP in the United States District Court for the District of Columbia to get discovery, accusing ECP of illicitly buying a controlling stake in the company.

== Corporate affairs ==
Historically its head office was in Rahimtulla Tower, in Upper Hill, Nairobi. The headquarters moved to a depot, in Muguga, Kiambu County, in July 2015 as a cost-saving measure. The offices were in prefabricated buildings formerly used as workshops. The property also had a golf facility installed after July 2015.

The holding company was registered in Mauritius.
