= Jianxi =

Jianxi may refer to:

- Jianxi (建熙; 360–370), era name used by Murong Wei, last emperor of Former Yan

== Places in China ==
- Jianxi District (涧西区), a district of Luoyang, Henan
- Jianxi, Anhui (涧溪), a town in Mingguang, Anhui
- Jianxi, Fujian (建西), a town in Shunchang County, Fujian

== See also ==
- Jiangxi, a province of China
- Jiangxi (disambiguation)
