= List of tallest buildings in Kenya =

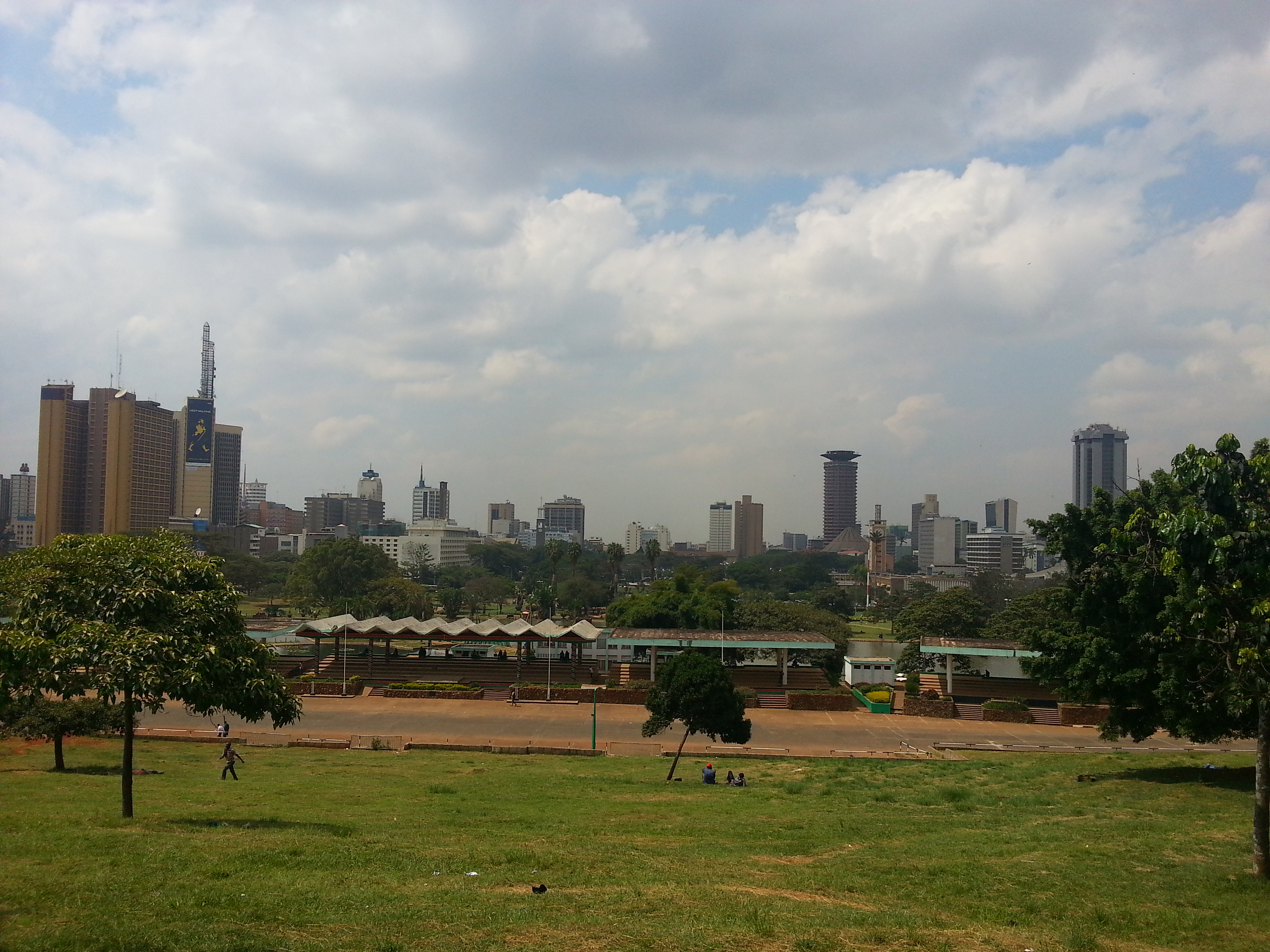
Nairobi skyline in August 2012

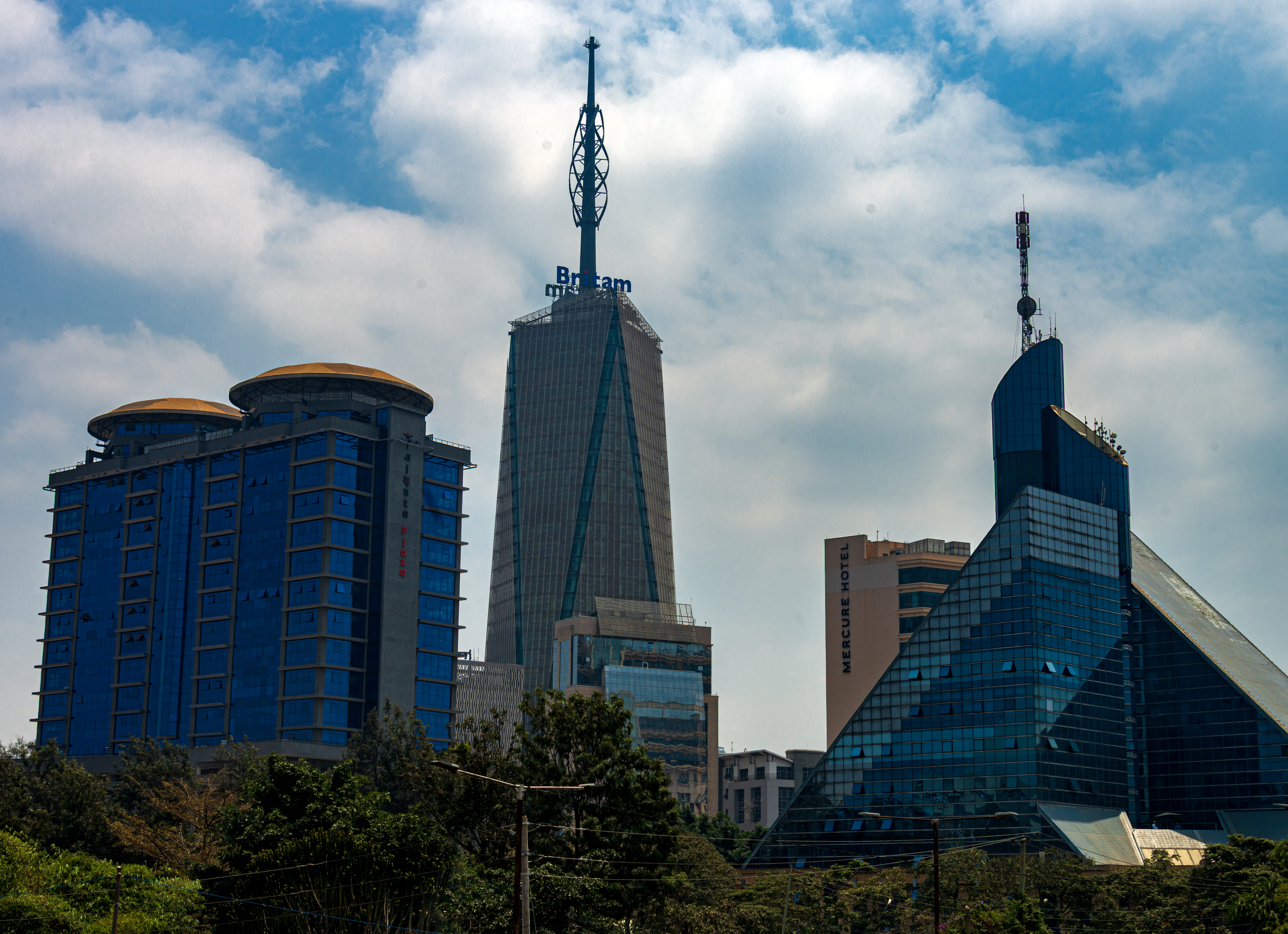
The Upper Hill

This list of the tallest buildings in Kenya ranks skyscrapers and high-rise buildings in Kenya by height. The vast majority of these skyscrapers are concentrated within the city of Nairobi, which serves as both the capital and the most populous urban center. In Nairobi, there are at least 20 completed skyscrapers and high-rise buildings that exceed a minimum architectural height of 80 m (262 ft). The tallest building in the country is the 31-story Britam Tower, which rises to an architectural height of 200.1 m (656 ft). Located in Nairobi, the skyscraper also stands as the second-tallest building in East Africa, surpassed only by the Commercial Bank of Ethiopia Headquarters in Addis Ababa, Ethiopia.

The evolution of the Nairobi skyline initiated with the completion of the IPS Building in 1967, followed by the Hilton Nairobi in 1969, the NSSF Building in 1973, and the Kenyatta International Convention Centre in 1974. Prior to the late 1960s, buildings within the city remained comparatively low-rise, until an initial commercial development surge accelerated vertical development. Between 1960 and 1980, the city experienced a significant expansion in skyscraper and high-rise engineering works, yielding a substantial portion of the municipal office inventory, including the Times Tower. Following this period of intense growth, a near 20-year stagnation in high-rise development ensued. However, a secondary, highly focused construction expansion commenced in the late 1990s and persists through 2026.

In 2015, Nairobi had 50 completed high-rise buildings, 6 projects under construction, and 6 proposed developments.

Regional urban centers across the nation are increasingly experiencing an acceleration in high-rise development. For example, the Moi University Pension Scheme Complex, subsequently renamed the Eldoret Daima Towers in Eldoret, reached completion in 2016 and stands at a maximum height of 89.7 m (294 ft), ranking it among the tallest buildings outside the capital. Furthermore, the construction of major high-rise buildings persists in other metropolitan zones, including the coastal city of Mombasa.

== Tallest buildings ==
Was the tallest building in Kenya upon completion
Indicates buildings that have been topped out but not yet completed

This list ranks completed and topped-out buildings in Kenya that stand at least 80 m (262 ft) tall, based on standard height measurement. This includes spires and architectural details, but does not include antenna masts. The "Year" column indicates the year in which a building was completed.

Rank	Name	Image	Height m (ft)	Floors	Year	City	Notes	References
1	Britam Tower		200.1 m (656 ft)	31	2017	Nairobi	Tallest building in Kenya since 2017. Located in Upper Hill. Tallest building completed in Kenya in the 2010s. Currently the tallest building in Kenya.	
2	Global Trade Center Office Tower		184 m (604 ft)	43	2021	Nairobi	Tallest building completed in Kenya in the 2020s. Located in Westlands. Formerly known as AVIC International African Headquarters.	
3	UAP Old Mutual Tower		163 m (535 ft)	33	2016	Nairobi	Tallest building in Kenya from 2016 to 2017. Located in Upper Hill.	
4	88 Nairobi Condominium Tower		150 m (492 ft)	48	2026	Nairobi	Tallest residential building in Kenya.	
5	Global Trade Center Hotel Tower		143 m (469 ft)	35	2021	Nairobi	Tallest hotel in Kenya. Second-tallest building within the GTC complex.	
6	Times Tower		140 m (459 ft)	38	2000	Nairobi	Tallest building in Kenya from 2000 to 2016. Tallest building completed in Kenya in the 2000s.	
7	Prism Tower		133 m (436 ft)	34	2018	Nairobi	Formerly known as Kings Prism Tower.	
8	Le'Mac		126 m (413 ft)	30	2017	Nairobi		
9	Bunge Tower		125 m (410 ft)	26	2024	Nairobi	Tallest government building in Kenya. Formerly known as Parliament Tower.	
10	Teleposta Towers		120 m (394 ft)	27	1999	Nairobi	Tallest building in Kenya from 1999 to 2000. Tallest building completed in Kenya in the 1990s.	
11	Global Trade Center Residential Tower 2		116 m (381 ft)	33	2021	Nairobi		
12	CBK Pension Towers		110 m (361 ft)	27	2022	Nairobi		
13	Kenya Commercial Bank Plaza		109.1 m (358 ft)	24	2015	Nairobi		
14=	Global Trade Center Residential Tower 1		109 m (358 ft)	31	2021	Nairobi		
14=	Global Trade Center Residential Tower 4		109 m (358 ft)	31	2021	Nairobi		
16	Kenyatta International Convention Centre		105.2 m (345 ft)	32	1974	Nairobi	Tallest building in Kenya from 1974 to 1999. Tallest building completed in Kenya in the 1970s.	
17	Upper Hill Chambers		104 m (341 ft)	26	2020	Nairobi		
18	Global Trade Center Residential Tower 3		103 m (338 ft)	29	2021	Nairobi		
19	Social Security House		102.7 m (337 ft)	28	1973	Nairobi	Tallest building in Kenya from 1973 to 1974. Formerly known as NSSF Building.	
20	I&M Bank Tower		99.1 m (325 ft)	18	2001	Nairobi		
21	KCB Plaza		99 m (325 ft)	21	2014	Nairobi		
22	Eldoret Daima Towers		89.7 m (294 ft)	26	2016	Eldoret	Tallest building in Kenya outside of Nairobi. Formerly known as MUPS Plaza.	
23	Sanlam Tower		89.1 m (292 ft)	20	2018	Nairobi		
24	Nyayo House		84.1 m (276 ft)	27	1982	Nairobi	Tallest building completed in Kenya in the 1980s.	
25	Cooperative Bank House		83 m (272 ft)	25	1981	Nairobi		
26	Nation Centre		82.9 m (272 ft)	17	1997	Nairobi		
27	National Bank House		82 m (269 ft)	21	1976	Nairobi		
28	Ocean Seven		80.6 m (264 ft)	25	2020	Mombasa	Tallest building in Mombasa.	
29	Rahimtulla Tower		80 m (262 ft)	18	1999	Nairobi		

== Tallest buildings under construction ==
Name	Height	Floors	Estimated Completion	City	Notes
NSSF Twin Tower A	260 m (853 ft)	60	2028	Nairobi	Upon completion, it will become the tallest building in both Kenya and East Africa.
NSSF Twin Tower B	145 m (476 ft)	35	2028	Nairobi	

== Tallest buildings proposed ==
Name	Height	Floors	Estimated Completion	City	Notes
Kingdom Tower	386 m (1,266 ft)	75	–	Nairobi	Considered to be a stale proposal.
Upper Hill Square	290 m (951 ft)	66	–	Nairobi	Considered to be a stale proposal.
Century Tower	254 m (833 ft)	70	–	Nairobi	Considered to be a stale proposal.

== Tallest buildings on hold ==
Name	Height	Floors	Year Began	Year Halted	City	Notes
Palm Exotjca	370 m (1,214 ft)	61	2018	2020	Watamu	Halted in 2020 following the refusal of the National Environment Management Authority (NEMA) to issue the mandatory Environmental Impact Assessment license for the development.
Pinnacle Tower 1	320 m (1,050 ft)	70	2017	2018	Nairobi	Indefinitely suspended in 2018 as a result of severe financial constraints alongside protracted legal disputes regarding the ownership and zoning regulations of the construction site.
Pinnacle Tower 2	201 m (659 ft)	45	2017	2018	Nairobi	
Montave	160 m (525 ft)	40	2016	–	Nairobi	Construction was originally scheduled to commence in late 2017; however, following a series of operational delays, the project was indefinitely halted.

== Tallest buildings cancelled ==
Name	Height	Floors	Year Cancelled	City	Notes
G47 Ugatuzi Tower (Original Proposal)	288 m (945 ft)	66	2025	Nairobi	Downsized to 34 floors.
Hazina Trade Centre (Original Proposal)	180 m (591 ft)	39	2017	Nairobi	Downsized to 15 floors.
Cytonn Towers	150 m (492 ft)	35	2018	Nairobi	Ultimately cancelled after Nairobi City County and the local judiciary determined that the developers failed to adequately mitigate the severe traffic congestion and community disruptions the massive 35-story project would introduce to the Kilimani area.

== See also ==
- List of tallest buildings in Africa
- List of tallest structures in the world by country
