= African Solidarity Fund =

Niger-based financial guarantee institution

The African Solidarity Fund (ASF), also known by its French name and acronym (Fonds de Solidarité Africain, FSA), is a multilateral, financial guarantee institution based in Niamey, Niger. Currently it has 24 member states. The purpose of the ASF is to contribute to the economic and social development of its regional member states by facilitating access to credit for states and public and private enterprises in its area of operation, to finance productive investment projects, and to mobilize local and external savings, in particular by providing loan guarantees on the financial markets.

== Historic overview ==
The Agreement establishing the African Solidarity Fund was adopted by the National Assembly of France and signed in Paris on 21 December 1976. The purpose of the ASF at that time was to facilitate the economic development of the participating African States - mainly States most disadvantaged by structural factors - by contributing to the financing of investment projects of particular interest. Fifteen African States and France participated in the creation of the Fund. The application for membership of three other African countries was accepted by the original members as early as April 1977. In France, the creation of the Fund was the subject of Law no. 77-732 of 7 July 1977.

ASF operations began in September 1979.

The French National Assembly adopted several amendments to the Agreement establishing the Fund in 1991. Law No. 91-1401 of 31 December 1991 validated changes to the conditions of guarantees of repayment, the headquarters, the resources, the operations, and the organization of the Fund. With regard to the headquarters, Law No. 91-1401 indicates that – even if the Agreement of 21 December 1976 had fixed the seat "provisionally" in Paris – since its creation, the headquarters of the Fund had always been established de facto in Niamey, Republic of Niger.

After more than 30 years of existence, the Fund's constituent texts were subject to further revision. Thus, at their meeting on 20 December 2008, held in Niamey, the Ministers responsible for the Fund adopted the Revised Agreement establishing the African Solidarity Fund. The Revised Agreement entered into force upon notification of its ratification by the majority of signatory States. France, which ratified the Agreement of 21 December 1976 and participated in the activities of the Fund until 2000, is not among the signatories to the Revised Agreement.

At the end of 2021, a first amendment was adopted by the representatives of the member countries of the ASF concerning several changes to the Revised Agreement of 2008, particularly with regard to the transfer of powers from the General Assembly to the Board of Governors and the definitions of the purpose and missions of the ASF.

== Mission ==
The mission of the ASF is to contribute to the economic development and social progress of its African member states by facilitating, through its intervention techniques, access to the financial resources needed to carry out investment projects and other income-generating activities.

== Member States ==
The 24 member states of the ASF are Benin, Burkina Faso, Burundi, Cape Verde, Central African Republic, Comoros, Congo, Côte d'Ivoire, Gabon, Gambia, Guinea, Guinea-Bissau, Liberia, Mali, Mauritania, Mauritius, Morocco, Niger, Rwanda, Senegal, Sierra Leone, South Sudan, Chad and Togo.

== Organization ==
The management of the ASF's internal structures is ensured by the Board of Governors, the Board of Directors and the Director General. The Board of Governors is composed of the Ministers of Finance of the Member States. The Board of Directors includes one administrator per member state. The Director General is named by the Board of Directors and tasked with the management of ASF's daily operations.

The Specialised Committees include ad hoc and permanent committees that deliberate on operational and institutional matters as mandated by the Board of Directors.

== The mobilization and allocation of resources ==
The financial resources of the ASF consist of endowments resulting from shareholder (member state) capital payments, operational revenue, investment gained from earnings, grants, resources allocated to specific tasks related to third-party fund management, and revenue from fixed deposits.

The authorized capital of the ASF is made up of contributions from its members. African member states of the ASF are category A shareholders. Non-African member states and institutions are category B shareholders. On 30 June 2023, the Development Bank of the Central African States (BDEAC) became the ASF's first category B shareholder.

The ASF intervenes in all sectors of the national economies of its member states, in particular in basic infrastructure, industries and energy.

== The types of intervention ==
The principal types of intervention are the guarantee, refinancing, interest rate subsidies, stake acquisition, third party fund management, and arrangement of structuring the financing for small and medium-sized enterprises (SMEs).

As of 31 December 2020, the cumulative approvals of guarantees reached EUR 1,164.1 million, in favor of 442 projects in 15 of the Fund's member states. These interventions enabled the mobilization of financing amounting to EUR 2,252.3 million. In fiscal year 2021, 51 guarantee requests were approved for a total amount of EUR 199.8 million.

== Regional and international partners ==
Since 1996, the ASF has worked closely with the West African Development Bank (BOAD). Their cooperation agreement was renewed in November 2013. As part of this agreement, the ASF provided both guarantees and interest rate subsidies for several loans. This permitted the BOAD to increase the volume of loans that it provides to investors in the West African region.

In July 2018, the ASF signed a partnership agreement with the French Public Investment Bank Bpifrance. The general objective of this partnership is to promote the development of the private sector and the commercial public sector in ASF member countries. Bpifrance wants to thereby strengthen the capacities of the ASF to better meet the needs of investors in its areas of intervention.

On 25 January 2020, the ASF signed a partnership agreement with the Development Bank of the Central African States (BDEAC). This agreement was signed with a view to increasing the financing of public and private investments in ASF member states. For the ASF, this implied a substantial increase of ASF interventions in the Central African region. In a follow up to this partnership agreement, the BDEAC, ASF and the Gabonese company SERUS Investments SA convened on 6 September 2021 in Niamey, Niger, to sign a guarantee agreement facilitating the construction of a major business and hotel complex in Moanda, Gabon. ASF agreed to guarantee 60% of the proposed investment loan, amounting to the equivalent of about US$2.74 million.

On 21 December 2023, Moussa Faki Mahamat, President of the African Union Commission, received the credentials of Mr. Abdourahmane Diallo, Managing Director of the African Solidarity Fund, as observer to the African Union.

In June 2024, the Director of the ASF announced an increase in the Fund's capital of around USD 286.8 million, thanks to support provided by the Arab Bank for Economic Development in Africa (BADEA).

== Ratings ==
The ASF has been the object of numerous independent ratings during the past decade. Here are some of the most recent ratings.

On November 25, 2025, the rating agency GCR Ratings (GCR) affirmed the Fund's long-term issuer rating of AAA(WU) on its regional scale. In addition, the short-term issuer rating was affirmed at A1+(WU). The outlook is stable. According to GCR, ASF's rating is based on the strength of its liquidity profile, the continued improvement in its claims ratio, and the gradual diversification of its shareholding structure.

At a ceremony held on 28 May 2024 in Nairobi, Kenya, the ASF was awarded an A rating by the Association of African Development Finance Institutions (AADFI), after having been assessed in terms of its compliance with NDPSE standards (Standards, Prudential Frameworks, and Evaluation System), as well as its impact on the development of its member states.

In November 2023, Moody's Investors Service (Moody's) assigned a Baa1 long-term foreign currency issuer rating to the ASF, with a stable outlook. Moody's rating reflected ASF's moderate capital adequacy, balancing weak asset quality against moderate and improving leverage, the Fund's liquidity position supported by structurally positive net cashflows, and the low strength of member support in case of need.

== Performance ==
In January 2021, ASF's compliance with ISO 9001:2015 was certified by the UK branch of Veritas Certification Holding SAS. Compliance with ISO 9001:2015 may serve as an objective and verifiable indicator of ASF's strong performance in terms of operational management and fund administration.

== Regional significance ==
The ASF is one of the three main multilateral financial guarantee institutions on the African continent, the others being: the African Guarantee Fund (AGF) and the Fonds Africain de Garantie et de Coopération Economique (FAGACE).

In February 2025, the ASF obtained official recognition as a specialized institution of the African Union. This decision was taken at the Summit of the Heads of the member States of the African Union.

== Perspectives ==
South Sudan joined the ASF in late June 2026. Morocco and Sierra Leone joined in June 2024. Other countries are in the process of joining the ASF, including Madagascar.
