= Jiangxi International =

Chinese construction and engineering company

China Jiangxi International Economic and Technical Cooperation Co., Ltd
- Type: State-owned enterprise
- Industry: Construction and engineering, real estate development, architectural design, geological exploration
- Founded: 1983
- Headquarters: Nanchang, Jiangxi, China
- Area served: Ghana, Botswana, Zambia, Kenya, and Zimbabwe
- Website: Official website

China Jiangxi International Economic and Technical Cooperation Co., Ltd (abbreviated as CJIC or called Jiangxi International) is a Chinese construction and engineering company that operates in many countries of Anglophone Africa. By sales revenue it is a top international contractor, ranking in 2013 among the 250 largest construction companies by international project value, with $392.3 in revenue.

Its Kenya subsidiary was selected in 2013 by the National Social Security Fund (Kenya) to build the Trade Centre, a $68 million 39-storey building set to the tallest in Nairobi.

In Ghana it is building the Cape Coast Stadium, a $30 million 15,000 spectator stadium given as a gift by China.

In more than 50 countries and regions in Asia, Africa, Oceania and Latin America, CJIC has delivered over 600 international contracting projects and China's foreign aid projects concerning buildings, roads and bridges, water conservancy, airports, stadiums and power supply infrastructure. The total contract value of CJIC's projects has reached 8 billion USD. In respect of foreign labour service, CJIC has sent about 100,000 skilled workers to Japan, Singapore, Jordan and Saipan (US).
