= Jiangxi Subdistrict =

Jiangxi Subdistrict 江溪街道
- Subdistrict
- Location in Jiangsu
- Coordinates: 31°34′11″N 120°20′32″E
- Country: People's Republic of China
- Province: Jiangsu
- Prefecture-level city: Wuxi
- District: Xinwu District
- Time zone: UTC+8 (China Standard)

Jiangxi Subdistrict (Chinese: 江溪街道; pinyin: Jiāngxī Jiēdào) is a subdistrict in Xinwu District, Wuxi, Jiangsu province, China. As of 2020, it has 26 residential communities, two villages, and two park communities under its administration.

Neighborhoods

- Jingdu Community (景渎社区)
- Tangnan Community (塘南社区)
- Shuguang Community (曙光社区)
- Xingzhu Community (兴竹社区)
- Dongfeng Community (东风社区)
- Fenglei Community (风雷社区)
- Taihu Huayuan First Community (太湖花园第一社区)
- Taihu Huayuan Second Community (太湖花园第二社区)
- Xukangli Community (叙康里社区)
- Yichun Community (奕淳社区)
- Xufengli Community (叙丰里社区)
- Fangqian Community (坊前社区)
- Xufeng Jiayuan Community (叙丰家园社区)
- Qianjin Community (前进花园社区)
- Wanyuyuan First Community (万裕苑第一社区)
- Wanyuyuan Second Community (万裕苑第二社区)
- Xinfengyuan First Community (新丰苑第一社区)
- Xinfengyuan Second Community (新丰苑第二社区)
- Chuncheng Jiayuan Community (春城家园社区)
- Dongfeng Jiayuan Community (东风家园社区)
- Weixing Community (卫星社区)
- Tixiang Community (缇香社区)
- Chunnuan Community (春暖社区)
- Dingcheng Community (鼎城社区)
- Chunyang Community (春阳社区)
- Huafeng Community (华丰社区)

Villages

- Yongfeng Village (永丰村)
- Jingdu Village (景渎村)

Parks

- Economic Development Park Community (经济发展园社区)
- Wuxi New District Industrial Expo Park Community (无锡新区工博园社区)

== See also ==
- List of township-level divisions of Jiangsu
