= Times Tower =

Office tower in Nairobi, Kenya

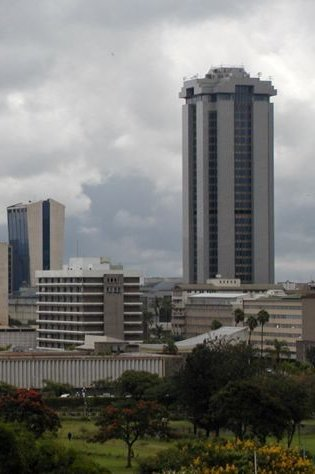
- Interactive map of the Times Tower area

Record height
- Tallest in East Africa from 2000 to 2015^{[I]}
- Preceded by: Teleposta Towers
- Surpassed by: UAP Tower

General information
- Type: Commercial
- Location: Haile Selassie Avenue; Nairobi, Kenya
- Coordinates: 1°17′25″S 36°49′26″E
- Construction started: 1992
- Completed: 2000

Height
- Roof: 140 m (459 ft)

Technical details
- Floor count: 33

Design and construction
- Architect: Triad Architects

The Times Tower, also known as the New Central Bank Tower, is an office tower in Nairobi, Kenya. At 140 metres (459 feet), it is the fourth tallest building in Kenya after Britam Tower, GTC Office Tower and UAP Tower, which have heights of 200 m (656 ft), 184 m (604 ft) and 163 m (535 ft) respectively. With 38 floors, along with a 7-storey banking complex and an 11-split storey car park, it is served by 10 elevators. The building is designed to resist earthquakes, and is set on a concrete raft varying in thickness from 0.9 to 3.0 m (2 ft 11 in to 9 ft 10 in). The building houses the main offices of the Kenya Revenue Authority (KRA).

== Overview ==
The only tenant of the building is the Kenya Revenue Authority, who use it for tax remissions and administration, and it serves as a location for taxpayer education.

The building is often the site of long queues, especially near the 20th of every month when taxes are due to be paid.

Security to the building is tight, with all guests going through screening by guards using metal detectors. It is well guarded by armed policemen at all times. The entrance is different from the exit to ensure easy handling of visitors.

To get into the building beyond the ground floor requires either a Kenyan ID card for locals or passports for foreigners. Entry without the documents is not allowed unless the member of staff being visited leaves his ID documents in place of the visitor.

Some floors are off limits for non-workers, such as the seventh floor.

== Gallery ==
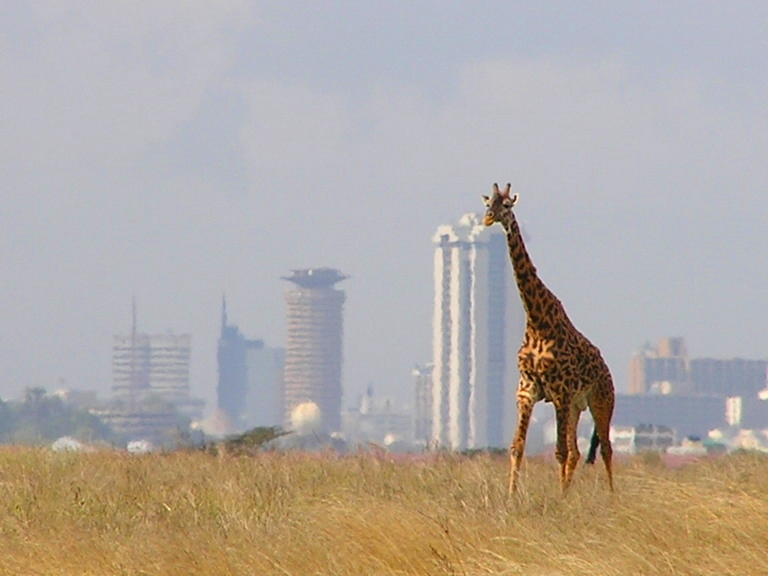

== See also ==
- List of tallest buildings in Kenya
- List of tallest buildings in Africa
