= Investment advisory =

Service recommending securities

An investment advisory is a service that recommends certain securities primed for appreciation, usually through direct management of clients' assets or by way of written publications.

== Purpose ==
Advisory services usually explain their investment theses to their customers and propose assets (such as stocks) that they view will appreciate over time. Advisers typically provide ongoing advice about buying, selling and/or holding investments and will monitor the performance of the client's investments and their alignment with the buyer's overall investment objectives. The fee that the customer pays for this advice is typically based on the value of all of the assets held in their account with the adviser. They may pay other fees and costs related to servicing the account and the investments that are bought or sold. Advisers also may give advice about market trends or asset allocation or offer financial planning services.

Investment advisers owe a fiduciary duty to their clients and are required to put their clients’ interests first at all times. Advisors usually suggest various potential investment strategies designed to best meet clientele needs given their budget and preferences.

Risk Management: Investment advisory services help clients navigate the inherent risks associated with financial markets. By conducting thorough risk assessments, advisors can tailor investment portfolios to match clients’ risk tolerance and financial services.

== Regulation and disclosure ==
In the US, investment advisers are regulated under the Investment Advisers Act of 1940 and may be registered with either the U.S. Securities and Exchange Commission or state securities authorities, depending on their size and business activities. Registered investment advisers file Form ADV, which provides information about the adviser's business, ownership, clients, employees, business practices, affiliations, and disciplinary history.

An investment adviser's fiduciary duty includes providing advice in the client's best interest and having a reasonable basis for advice in light of the client's objectives. This duty differs from the obligations of broker-dealers, which are governed by separate standards when making recommendations to retail customers.
