= Britam Tower =

Building in Nairobi

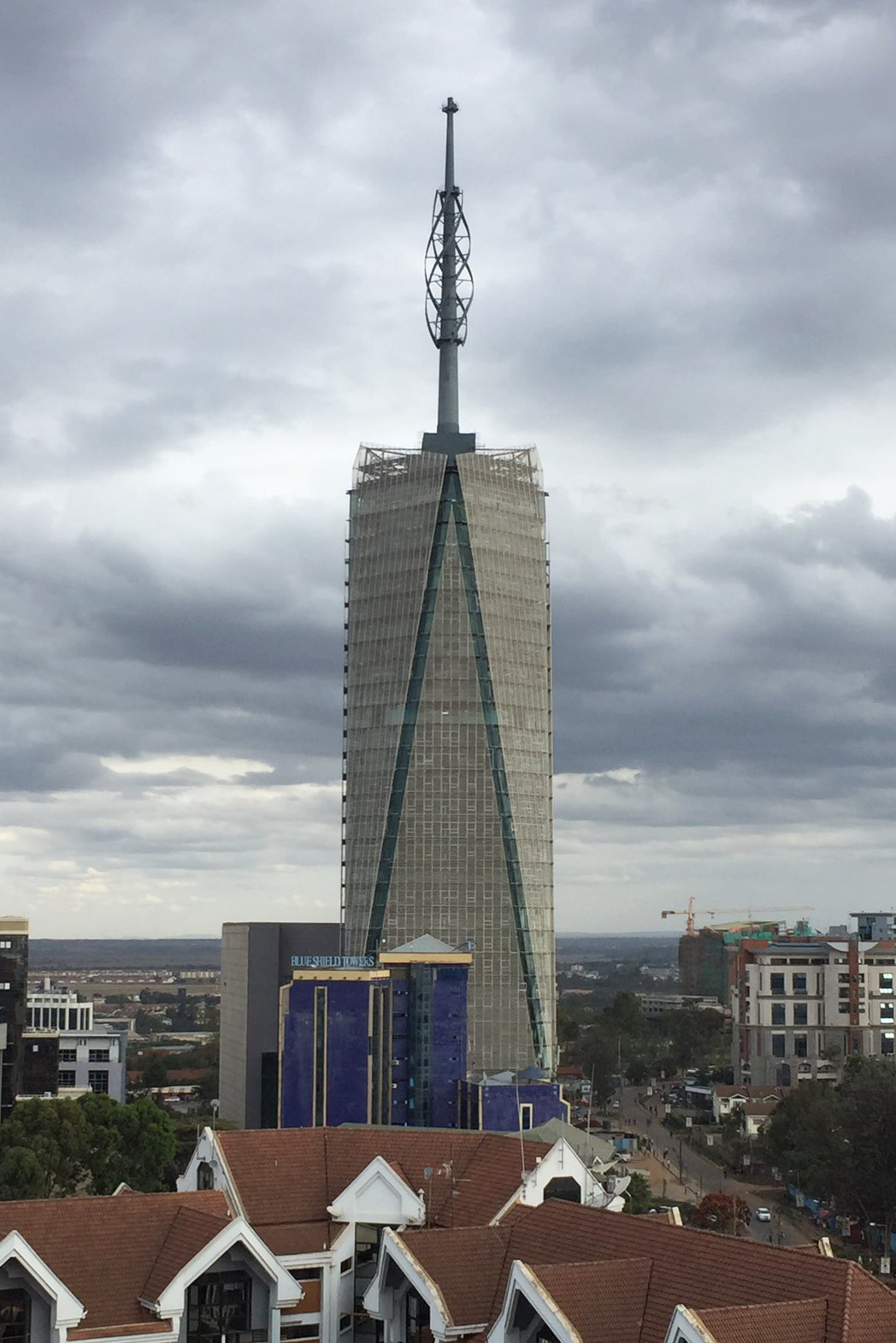
- Britam Tower on 10 March 2017.
- Interactive map of the Britam Tower area

Record height
- Tallest in Kenya since 2017^{[I]}
- Preceded by: UAP Old Mutual Tower

General information
- Status: Completed
- Architectural style: Structural Expressionism
- Location: Hospital Road, Upper Hill, Nairobi, Kenya
- Coordinates: 01°18′00″S 36°48′47″E
- Elevation: 1,795 metres (5,889 ft)
- Current tenants: Equity Group Holdings
- Construction started: September 2013
- Completed: September 2017
- Cost: KSh. 7 billion (US$70 Million)
- Client: Britam
- Owner: Britam

Height
- Height: 200.1 metres (656 ft)

Dimensions
- Diameter: 160 by 150 metres (520 ft × 490 ft)

Technical details
- Floor count: 32
- Floor area: 31,500 m^{2} (339,000 sq ft)

Design and construction
- Architects: Chris Kroese, GAPP Architects and Urban Designers

Website
- www.britam.com

The Britam Tower is a commercial building in Nairobi owned by British-American Investments Company (Britam). The skyscraper, the tallest building in Kenya, rises 200 metres (656 ft) above ground, with 32 usable floors. The building features a unique prismic shape, that starts as an equal four sided square footprint and ends with a two sided roof with a 60-metre (200 ft) mast, containing three helical wind turbines.

== Location ==
The tower is located along Hospital Road, in the Upper Hill neighbourhood of Nairobi, Kenya's capital and largest city.

== Overview ==
The building is the international headquarters of Britam. It also serves as the regional headquarters of the business conglomerate in East and Central Africa. The building has a total of 350,000 square feet (32,516 m^{2}) of office space to let for commercial purposes. To cater to its many tenants, the building has an attached 12 Storey Car Park that can accommodate up to 1,000 vehicles.

== Since 2018 ==
In July 2018, nearly one year after the building was completed, Britam, the skyscraper's owner-developer, began letting the building to prospective tenants. The target clientele are financial institutions, diplomatic missions, private companies and multinational corporations.

== See also ==
- One World Trade Center
