= UAP Old Mutual Tower =

33-storey office complex in the Upper Hill neighbourhood of Nairobi

Old Mutual Tower
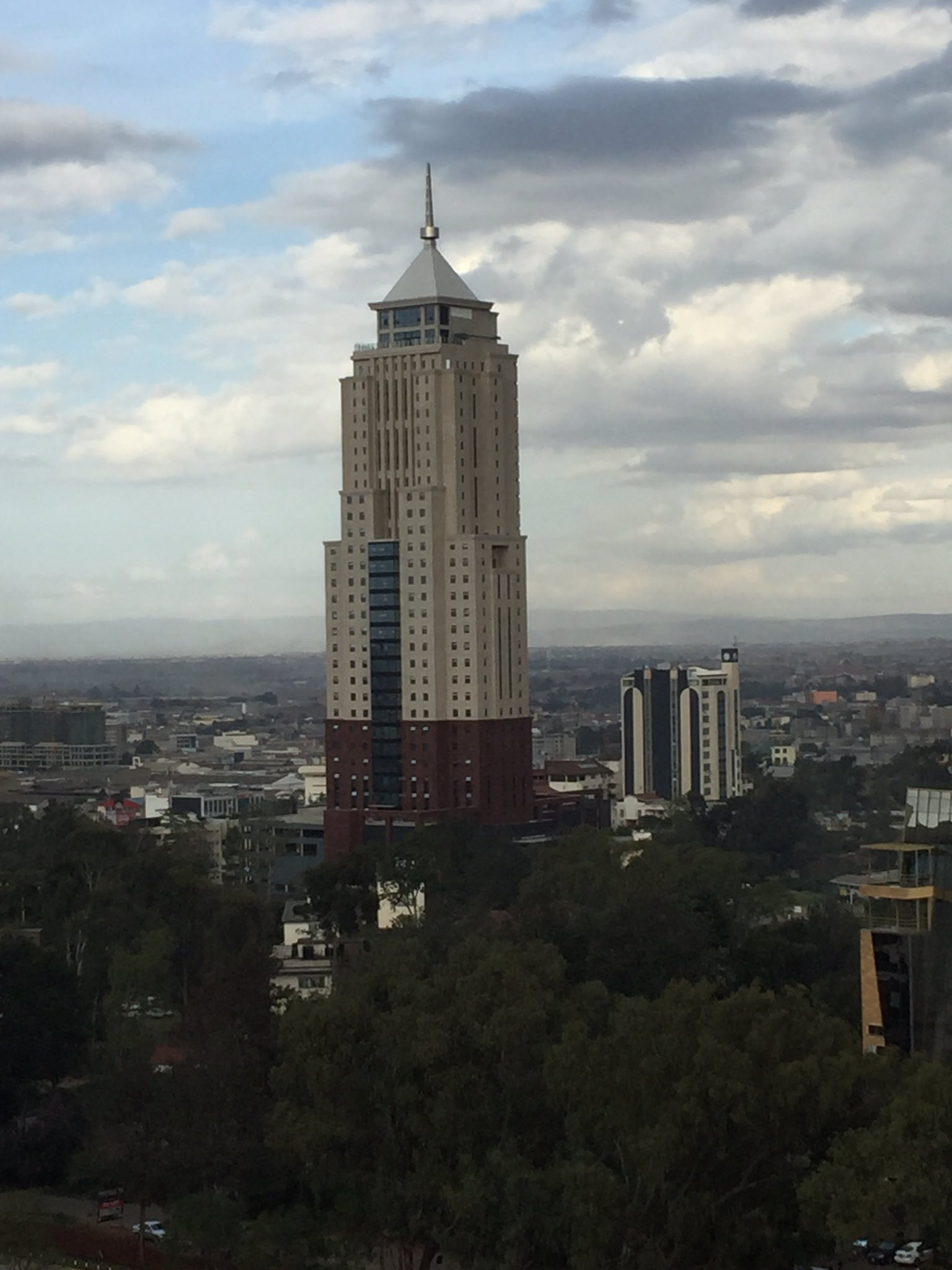
- Interactive map of the Old Mutual Tower area

Record height
- Tallest in East Africa from 2015 to 2016; 10 years ago^{[I]}
- Preceded by: Times Tower
- Surpassed by: Britam Tower

General information
- Status: Completed
- Type: Office and Retail Space
- Location: Upper Hill, Nairobi, Kenya
- Coordinates: 01°18′02″S 36°48′47″E
- Estimated completion: August 2015
- Opening: 5 July 2016
- Owner: UAP Old Mutual Holdings

Height
- Roof: 163 m (535 ft)

Technical details
- Floor count: 33

UAP Old Mutual Tower is a 33-storey office complex in the Upper Hill neighbourhood of Nairobi, the capital and largest city in Kenya. It became the tallest structure in Kenya upon its completion in 2015, surpassing Times Tower which had held that record for 15 years. Two years later it was surpassed by the nearby Britam Tower.

== Location ==
The skyscraper is located on Hospital Road, Upper Hill, Nairobi, about 3.5 kilometres (2 mi), west of the city's central business district.

== Overview ==
UAP Tower is owned by UAP Old Mutual Group, a financial services conglomerate headquartered in Kenya, with subsidiaries in six African countries. It has 29,000 square metres (310,000 ft^{2}) in rentable space, and serves as the corporation's headquarters. The tower was financed through private equity at a total of KSh 4 billion (approximately US$40 million as of 2015). The building opened for business on 5 July 2016 and was 50 percent filled on opening day.

== Gallery ==
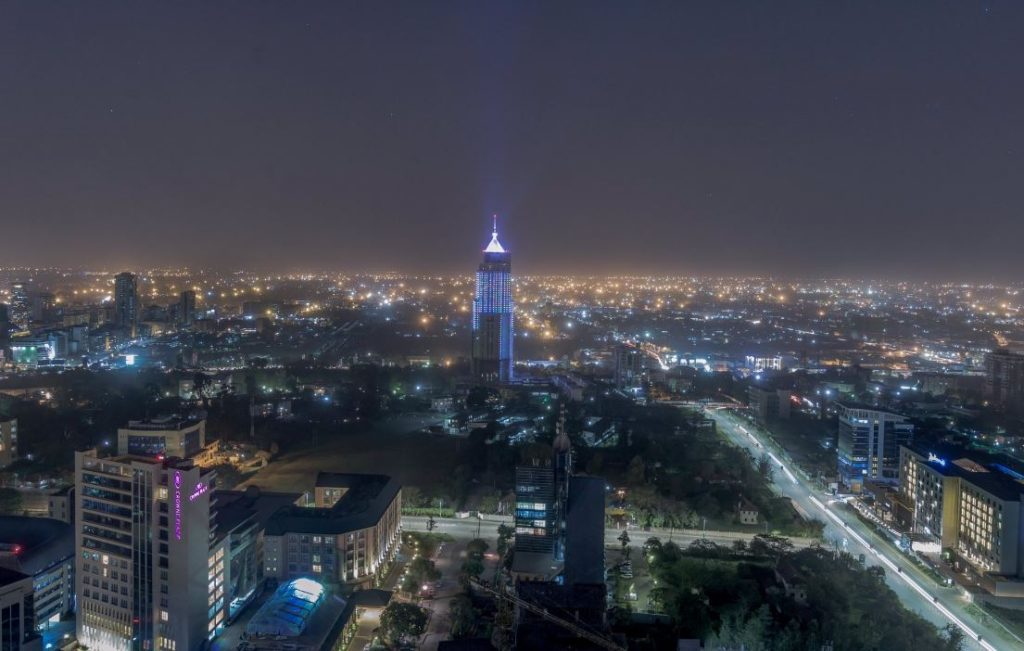
UAP Old Mutual Tower in the Nairobi night skyline

== See also ==
- List of tallest buildings in Kenya
- List of tallest buildings in Africa
