= Teleposta Towers =

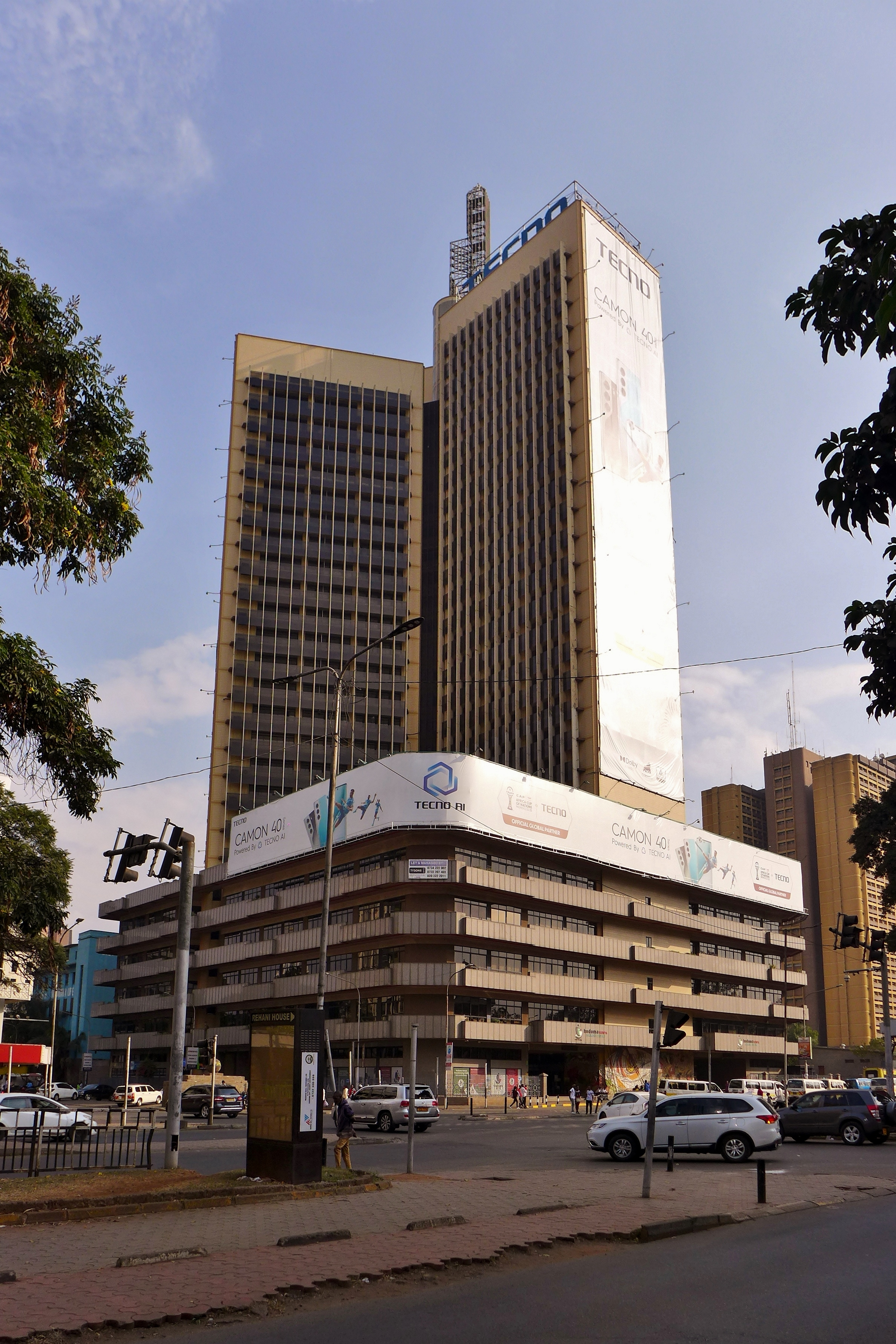
- Teleposta Towers in 2025
- Interactive map of the Teleposta Towers area

General information
- Status: Completed
- Location: 3 Koinange Street (cnr Kenyatta Avenue), Nairobi, Kenya
- Coordinates: 1°17′10″S 36°49′10″E
- Construction started: 1996
- Completed: 1999

Height
- Height: 120 metres (390 ft)

Technical details
- Floor count: 27

Design and construction
- Architect: Dr Paul Ndarua
- Main contractor: Laxmanbhai Construction

Teleposta Towers is the eighth-tallest building in Nairobi, Kenya. The building is located in central Nairobi along Kenyatta Avenue. It is 120 metres (390 ft) in height. The towers have 27 floors, and it houses Telkom Kenya, Kenya's Ministry of Information and Communications, and Kenya's Ministry of Trade. Construction of the towers was started in 1996, and completed in 1999. It was designed by Dr Paul Ndarua and constructed by Laxmanbhai Construction.

== Relative Heights in Kenya, Nairobi ==
When constructed in 1999 it was the third tallest building in Kenya. By 2019, it had been reduced to the 7th tallest building in the country. It is 120 m (390 ft) tall. The building has 27 floors.

== Power and Services ==
Power for the towers is provided by the Kenya Power and Lighting Company. Two diesel generators are used to provide standby Power. They were gifted from the United Kingdom by Welland Power. One generator provides power for the building services, the other for the fire pumps.

== See also ==
- New Central Bank Tower
