= Faulu Microfinance Bank Limited =

- Type: Private Subsidiary
- Industry: Banking and Finance
- Founded: 1991
- Headquarters: Nairobi, Kenya
- Key people: Apollo N. Njoroge; Managing Director; Dr. Peter W. Muthoka; Chairman
- Products: Loans Micro-Insurance
- Parent: Old Mutual
- Website: www.faulukenya.com

Faulu Microfinance Bank Limited, commonly referred to as Faulu Kenya, is a microfinance bank based in Kenya. It is regulated by the Central Bank of Kenya. The word Faulu is Swahili for succeed.

== History ==
Faulu Microfinance Bank is a limited liability company duly incorporated in Kenya under the Companies Act. The company changed its name to Faulu Kenya Deposit Taking Microfinance (DTM) Limited in 2008 as part of the requirements to obtain the Deposit Taking Licence from the Central Bank of Kenya. In May 2009, Faulu became the first registered DTM in Kenya under the Micro-Finance Act and is regulated by the CBK. The bank has grown from one MFI office in 1991 to over 90 service outlets which include 27 banking branches in seven of the eight provinces in Kenya by end of 2011.

In April 2014, Old Mutual completed its acquisition of 67% of Faulu Kenya through a KSH 2 billion capital injection. The acquisition gave Old Mutual a greater market reach through the Faulu Kenya branches across Kenya and gave Faulu Kenya greater capital to meet statutory requirements.

== Ownership ==
The stock of Faulu Kenya is privately held with Old Mutual being the largest shareholder with 67% of the issued capital.

== See also ==
- Central Bank of Kenya
- Kiva
- Food for the Hungry (FH)
- List of banks in Kenya
