= Upper Hill, Nairobi =

Neighbourhood of Nairobi, Kenya

Upper Hill
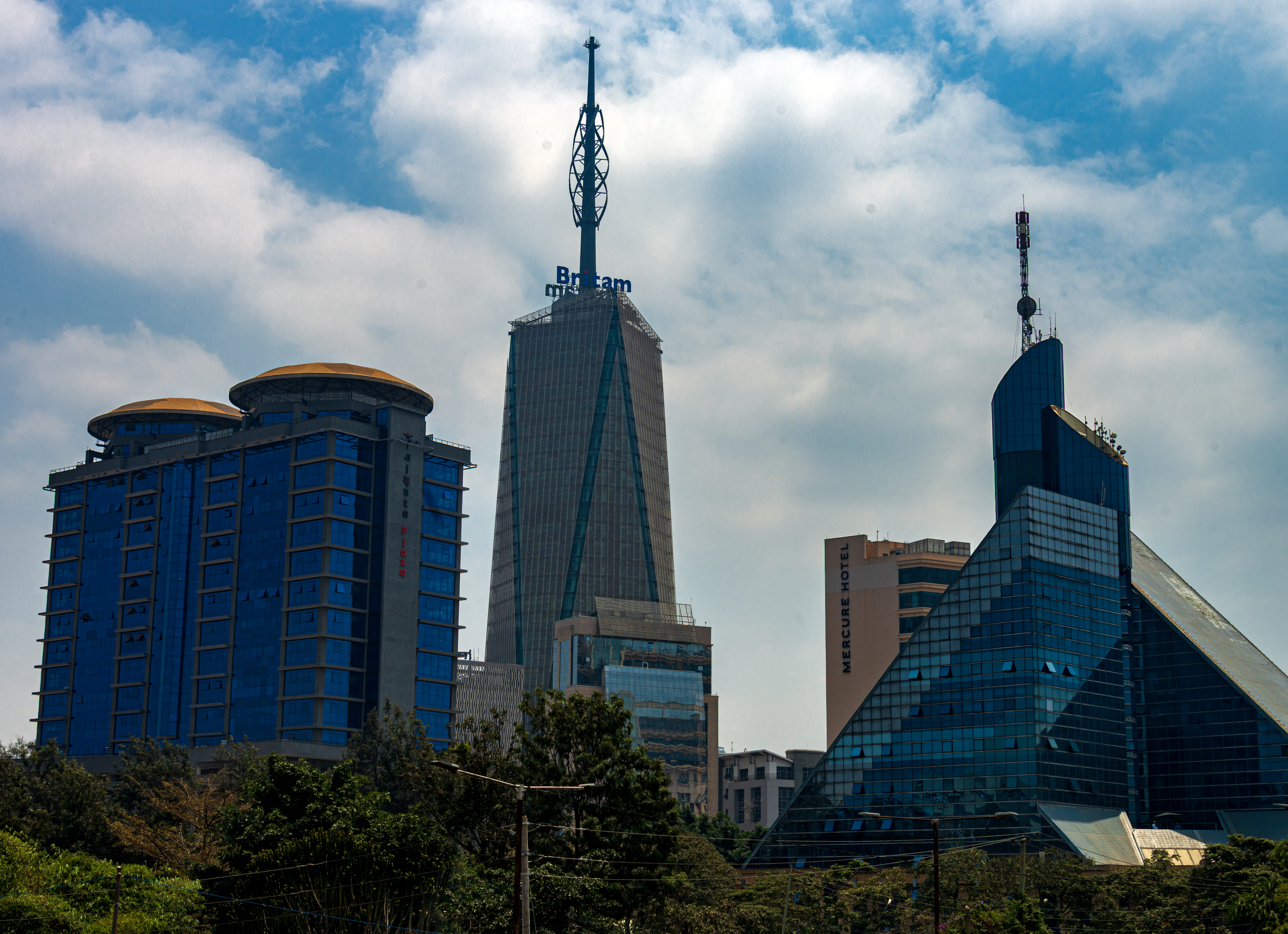
- Britam Tower and skyline, 2025

- Location of Upper Hill, Nairobi in Kenya
- Coordinates: 01°17′59″S 36°48′58″E
- Country: Kenya
- County: Nairobi City
- Sub-county: Westlands & Kibra
- Elevation: 5,600 ft (1,700 m)

Upper Hill is a central business district of the city of Nairobi, the capital and largest city of Kenya. The district has seen an increase in major construction in recent years, with several multinational corporations setting up offices.

== Location ==
Upper Hill is located 4 kilometres (2 mi) by road west of the central business district of Nairobi. The coordinates of Upper Hill are 1°17′59″N 36°48′58″E. Upper Hill lies in two major Nairobi City sub-counties; Kibra and Westlands. Ngong Road separates the two sub-counties.

== Overview ==
Upper Hill was historically one of the residential neighbourhoods of the city of Nairobi, during colonial times, and stretched all the way to the Kilimani estate. The 280 hectares (700 acres) that comprise part of Upper Hill were majorly owned by Kenya Railways. During the 1990s and early 2000s, as land and office space became scarce and exorbitantly priced in the central business district, businesses relocated to Upper Hill and Westlands, where land and office space were more readily available and less expensive. Today, Upper Hill possesses a new modern skyline that is still being filled by modern skyscrapers of different and prestigious designs in the architectural world.

== Economy ==
Spencon historically had its head office here, at Rahimtulla Tower.

== Landmarks ==
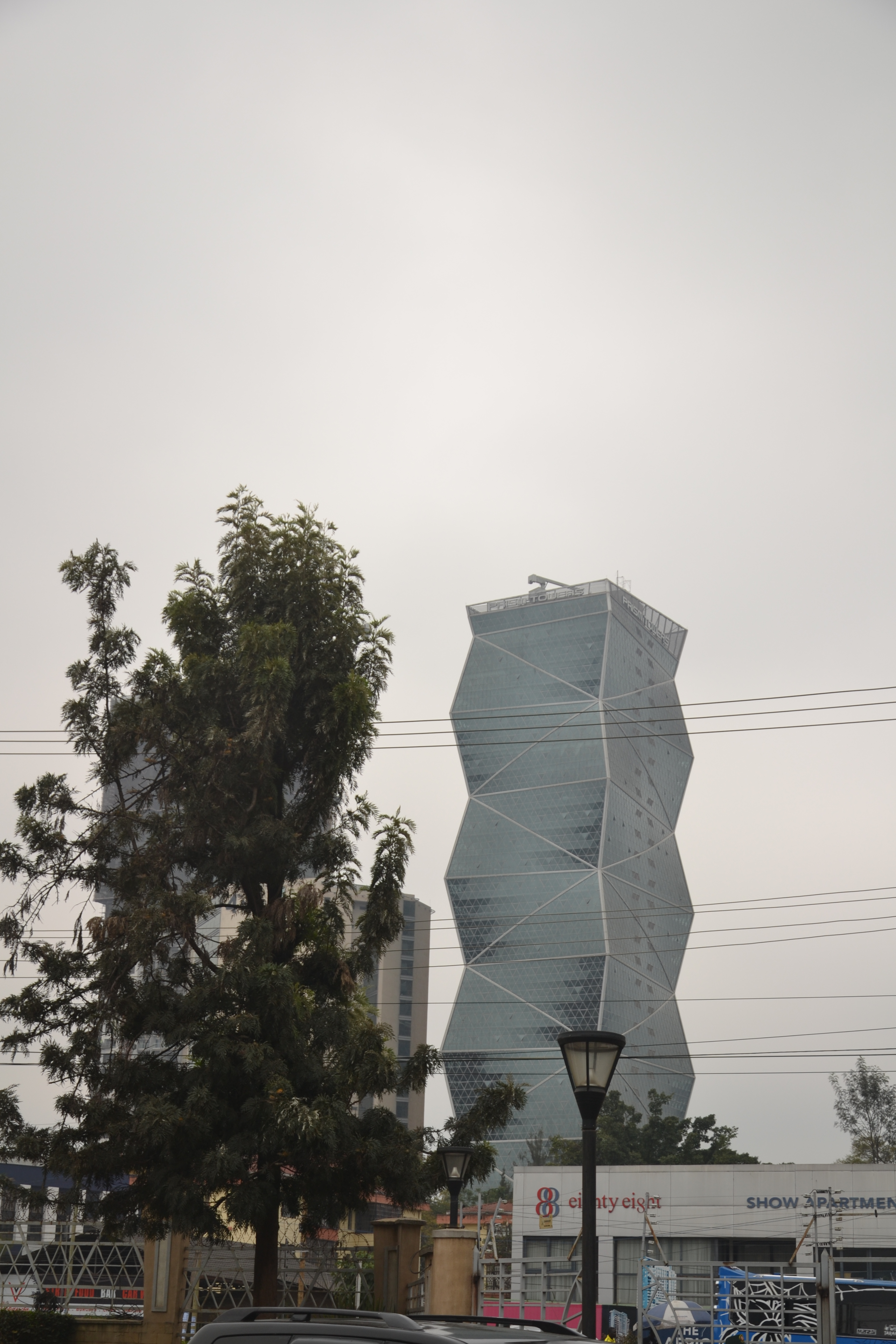
Prism Tower as seen from Kenyan National Library Service at Upper Hill, Kenya

In Upper Hill or near the boundaries of the suburb, there are several landmarks, including the following:

- Britam Tower, a 200-metre skyscraper, tallest building in Kenya, that houses an insurance company.
- UAP Old Mutual Tower, a 163-metre tower, the regional headquarters of UAP holdings.
- Prism Tower, a new upscale property along Ngong road.
- KCB towers, the new headquarters of KCB bank.
- Upper Hill District Association, an Association for Upper Hill
- The Kenyan regional offices of EMC Corporation
- Nairobi Hospital
- The headquarters of the Kenyan Ministry of Health
- Nairobi Club Ground – An upscale private membership cricket club, with a clubhouse and cricket oval.
- The offices of the World Health Organization in Kenya
- Upper Hill School
- The British High Commission in Kenya
- The Kenyan headquarters of the African Development Bank
- The Kenyan headquarters of Citibank
- The Kenyan headquarters of DawaSwift
- The headquarters of Equity Group Holdings
- The Kenyan headquarters of NextChat
- The headquarters of Britam
- The headquarters of NCBA Group
- The headquarters of Zep-Re (PTA Reinsurance)
- The headquarters of the Insurance Regulatory Authority
- The headquarters of Teacher Service Commission (TSC)
- The East African headquarters of Oxford University Press
- The Embassy of Japan
- The Embassy of Indonesia
- The Embassy of Israel
- The headquarters of UAP Group
- The headquarters of the Kenya Accountant and Secretaries National Examination Board (KASNEB)
- Institute of Certified Public Secretaries of Kenya (ICPSK)
- The Rahimtulla Tower, a twenty-two storey office skyscraper
- The Kenyan offices of the World Bank
- The Kenyan offices of the International Finance Corporation
- The headquarters of Victoria Commercial Bank, located in Victoria Towers on Kilimanjaro Avenue
- Kenya Commercial Bank Plaza (KCB Plaza)

== See also ==
- Abcon Complex & Towers
