= List of British Jewish scientists =

List of British Jewish scientists is a list that includes scientists from the United Kingdom and its predecessor states who are or were Jewish or of Jewish descent.

== Physicists ==
- Petrus Alphonsi, Spanish (not British) astronomer and doctor
- Edward Neville da Costa Andrade
- Sir Michael Berry, mathematical physicist
- Moses Blackman
- David Bohm, physicist, philosopher
- Sir Hermann Bondi, Austrian-born British cosmologist
- Max Born, physicist, Nobel Prize 1954 (converted to Lutheranism)
- Samuel Devons, physicist
- Cyril Domb, physicist, President of Association of Orthodox Jewish Scientists
- Paul Eisler, inventor of the printed circuit board
- Michael Fisher
- Otto Robert Frisch
- Herbert Frohlich
- Dennis Gabor, Nobel Prize for Physics 1971
- Sir David Lionel Goldsmid-Stern-Salomons, scientist and inventor
- Jeffrey Goldstone
- Ian Grant
- Sir Peter Hirsch, physicist
- Herbert Huppert, 1987
- Brian David Josephson, physicist, 1973 Nobel Prize
- George Kalmus, 1988
- Andrew Keller
- Olga Kennard, crystallographer 1987
- Rudolf Kompfner, invented the traveling wave tube
- Hans Kronberger, nuclear physicist
- Nicholas Kurti, physicist, Vice-President of the Royal Society 1965-67
- Frederick Lindemann, 1st Viscount Cherwell, physicist and politician
- Henry Lipson
- Sir Ben Lockspeiser
- Stanley Mandelstam
- Kurt Mendelssohn
- Leon Mestel, astronomer
- F.R. Nunes Nabarro
- Rudolf Peierls
- Michael Pepper
- Sir Joseph Rotblat, physicist, 1995 Nobel Peace Prize
- Adolf Schallamach, physics of friction and wear of rubber
- Sir Arthur Schuster
- Dennis Sciama, FRS, cosmologist
- David Shoenberg, physics of low temperatures (JYB 1995 p193)
- Sir Francis Simon
- David Tabor
- Samuel Tolansky, spectroscopist
- Felix Weinberg
- Michael Woolfson, crystallographer, computer simulation 1984
- Alec David Young, aero-engineer
- John Ziman

== Chemists ==
- Herbert Brown, chemist, 1979 Nobel Prize
- Sir Arnold Burgen
- Sir Roy Calne
- Jack David Dunitz, chemist
- Martin Fleischmann, chemist
- Rosalind Franklin, physical chemist and crystallographer, helped discover the structure of DNA
- Eugen Glueckauf
- Sir Ian Heilbron
- Walter Heitler
- Sir Aaron Klug, physicist and chemist, 1982 Nobel Prize
- Harold Kroto, discoverer of buckminsterfullerene, 1996 Nobel Prize (Jewish father; raised Jewish)
- Raphael Meldola
- Alfred Mond, chemist
- Ludwig Mond, chemist and industrialist
- Sir Robert Mond, chemist and archaeologist
- Albert Neuberger, chemical pathologist; father of Prof. James Neuberger, Lord Justice Sir David Neuberger and Prof. Michael Neuberger, and father-in-law of Julia Neuberger
- Friedrich Paneth
- Max Perutz, molecular biologist, 1962 Nobel Prize
- Michael Polanyi, chemist; naturalised British 1939
- Ralph Raphael
- Michael Rossmann
- Jeremy Sanders
- Anthony Segal
- Franz Sondheimer, organic chemist
- Michael Szwarc, polymer chemistry
- Carl Warburg, doctor of medicine and clinical pharmacologist
- Chaim Weizmann, acetone production; first president of Israel

== Biologists ==
- Saul Adler
- Ephraim Anderson, microbiologist
- Charlotte Auerbach
- Walter Bodmer, geneticist
- Gustav Victor Rudolf Born, professor of pharmacology
- Sydney Brenner, molecular biologist, 2002Nobel Prize
- Leslie Brent
- Edith Bülbring, pharmacologist (Jewish mother)
- Sir Ernst Chain, co-developer of penicillin, 1945 Nobel Prize
- Sir Philip Cohen, biologist
- Sydney Cohen, pathologist
- Emanuel Mendes da Costa, 18th-century botanist
- Raymond Dwek, biologist
- Sir Michael Epstein, co-discoverer of the Epstein-Barr virus
- Wilhelm Feldberg, pharmacologist
- Sir Alan Fersht, protein folding
- Sir Otto Frankel, geneticist
- Ian Glynn
- Professor Sir Abraham Goldberg, Regius Professor of Medicine, University of Glasgow and world authority on porphyria
- Susan Greenfield, Baroness Greenfield, neuroscientist and writer (Jewish father)
- Hans Gruneberg, biologist
- Sir Ludwig Guttmann, neurologist
- Sir Henry Harris
- Philip D'Arcy Hart, medical researcher
- Sir Gabriel Horn
- Alick Isaacs, virologist, interferon
- David Ish-Horowicz
- Sir Bernard Katz, biophysicist, 1970 Nobel Prize
- David Keilin, enzymologist
- Sir Hans Kornberg
- Hans Kosterlitz, pharmacologist
- Sir Hans Adolf Krebs, biochemist, 1953 Nobel Prize
- Sir John Krebs, zoologist
- Roland Levinsky, biologist
- Michael Levitt
- Hans Lissmann
- Joel Mandelstam
- Sir Michael Marmot, epidemiologist
- César Milstein, immunologist, 1984 Nobel Prize
- Leslie Orgel, evolutionary biologist
- Guido Pontecorvo
- Juda Quastel
- Ivan Roitt, immunologist 1983
- Steven Rose, biologist
- Sir Martin Roth, psychiatrist (JYB 2005 p214)
- Dame Miriam Louisa Rothschild, entomologist
- Victor Rothschild, 3rd Baron Rothschild
- Oliver Sacks, neurologist and author
- Isaac de Sequeira Samuda, first Jewish FRS, elected 1727
- Hannah Steinberg, psychopharmacologist
- John Vane, pharmacologist, 1982 Nobel Prize (Jewish father)
- Lawrence Weiskrantz, psychologist
- Robert Winston, Baron Winston, fertility expert and broadcaster
- Lewis Wolpert, developmental biologist and broadcaster
- John Yudkin, physiologist and nutritionist
- Lord Solly Zuckerman, anatomist, evolutionist

== Mathematicians and statisticians ==
- Abraham Manie Adelstein, statistician
- Hertha Ayrton, mathematician and engineer
- Laurence Baxter, statistician
- Abram Besicovitch, Russian-born British mathematician (karaite)
- Selig Brodetsky, mathematician, President of the Board of Deputies of British Jews, and President of the Hebrew University of Jerusalem
- Jacob Bronowski, mathematician and broadcaster
- Paul Cohn, algebraist
- H.E. Daniels, statistician
- Philip Dawid, statistician
- Arthur Erdelyi, mathematician
- Albrecht Frohlich
- David Glass, demographer
- Sir Samuel Goldman, British government statistician
- Sydney Goldstein, expert on fluid mechanics
- Benjamin Gompertz, mathematician
- Eugene Grebenik, demographer
- Steven Haberman, professor of actuarial science
- John Hajnal, demographer
- Hans Heilbronn
- Thomas Körner, mathematician
- Ruth Lawrence, mathematician and child prodigy
- Leone Levi, statistician
- Kurt Mahler, mathematician
- Sir Claus Moser, statistician
- Louis Mordell, number theorist
- Bernhard Neumann
- Richard Rado, mathematician
- Klaus Roth, mathematician, 1958 Fields Medal
- Bernard Silverman, statistician
- David Spiegelhalter, statistician
- James Joseph Sylvester, mathematician

== Computer scientists ==
- Samson Abramsky, computer scientist
- David Deutsch, quantum computing pioneer
- I.J. Good, cryptographer, philosopher of statistics; computing pioneer
- David Levy, computer chess expert
- Leo Marks, cryptographer and screenwriter
- Max Newman, mathematician and computing pioneer (Jewish father)
- Gordon Plotkin, computer scientist
- Leslie Valiant, computer scientist; parallel computation

== Economists ==
- Lord Bauer, economist
- Samuel Brittan, economist
- Charles Goodhart, Bank of England economist
- Noreena Hertz, economist and activist
- Richard Kahn, Baron Kahn, economist: multiplier
- Nicholas Kaldor, economist
- Michael Kidron, South African born Marxist economist, writer, cartographer and publisher
- Israel Kirzner, economist (UK-born)
- Ludwig Lachmann, economist
- Harold Laski, economist
- Alexander Nove, economist
- Sigbert Prais, economist
- David Ricardo, economist (converted to Quakerism)
- Arthur Seldon, economist
- Sir Hans Singer, economist
- Piero Sraffa, economist
- Lord Nicholas Stern, economist
- Basil Yamey, economist

== Social scientists ==
- Roy Clive Abraham, linguist
- Mark Abrams, sociologist
- Michael Balint, psychoanalyst (converted to Unitarianism)
- Zygmunt Bauman, sociologist
- Basil Bernstein, linguist
- Vernon Bogdanor, professor of politics
- Georgina Born, anthropologist; daughter of Gustav Victor Rudolf Born
- Gerald Cohen, professor of social and political theory
- Arthur Lumley Davids, linguist and orientalist
- Norbert Elias, sociologist
- Herman Finer, political scientist
- Samuel Finer, political scientist
- Sir Moses I. Finley, historian and sociologist
- Meyer Fortes, anthropologist
- Eduard Fraenkel, philologist
- Anna Freud, child psychoanalyst
- Norman Geras, professor of Government
- Morris Ginsberg
- Max Gluckman, anthropologist
- Frieda Goldman-Eisler, psycholinguist
- Theodor Goldstücker, orientalist
- Jean Gottmann, professor of geography, Oxford University
- Julius Gould, sociologist (JYB 2005 p249)
- Paul Hirst, social theorist (Jewish mother)
- Marie Jahoda, psychology of discrimination
- Josephine Klein, psychologist, psychoanalyst
- Melanie Klein, child psychoanalyst
- Paul Klemperer, economist
- Geoffrey Lewis Lewis, professor of Turkish
- Steven Lukes, political scientist
- Ashley Montagu, anthropologist and humanist
- Nikolas Rose, Martin White Professor of Sociology, LSE
- Isaac Schapera, anthropologist
- Edward Ullendorff, linguist

== See also ==
- Lists of Jews
- List of British Jews
