= Neuberger =

Neuberger is a surname of German origin. Notable people with the surname include:

- Albert Neuberger (1908–1996), British academic, member of the Royal Society
- David Neuberger, Baron Neuberger of Abbotsbury (b. 1948), British judge, barrister
- Günther Neuberger (contemporary), German Olympic bobsledder
- Herman N. Neuberger (1918–2005), German-American Orthodox rabbi
- James Neuberger (b. 1949), British physician, professor of medicine, and journal editor
- Julia Neuberger, Baroness Neuberger (b. 1950), British rabbi, social reformer, and Member of the House of Lords
- Leah Neuberger (1915–1993), American champion table tennis player
- Maurine Brown Neuberger (1907–2000), American politician from Oregon; U.S. Senator 1960–67
- Michael Neuberger (1953-2013), British biochemist and immunologist
- Richard L. Neuberger (1912–1960), American journalist, author, and politician from Oregon
- Roy Neuberger (1903-2010), American financier and art patron
- Samuel Neuberger, American attorney
- Sigmund Neuberger (1872–1911), German illusionist (magician) known as The Great Lafayette
- Willi Neuberger (b. 1946), German professional football player
