= List of people from the London Borough of Redbridge =

The following is a list of people who were born in the London Borough of Redbridge, or have dwelt within the borders of the modern borough (in alphabetical order):

- Bernard Ashmole, archaeologist
- Kenny Ball, trumpet playing English jazz musician
- Thomas John Barnardo, social reformer
- Nina Bawden, author
- Raymond Baxter, TV presenter
- Tony Bayfield, rabbi and leader of the Movement for Reform Judaism in the UK
- Nigel Benn, former boxer
- Sidney Bernstein, Baron Bernstein, media entrepreneur
- Jet Black (real name Brian Duffy), drummer with The Stranglers
- John Boardman, classical art historian, "Britain's most distinguished historian of ancient Greek art"
- Rhian Brewster (born 2000), Sheffield United F.C. footballer
- Geraldine Van Bueren, human rights lawyer
- Ken Campbell, comedian and actor
- Stuart Conquest, chess player
- Michael Coren, columnist, author, public speaker and radio host
- Malcolm Craven, England international speedway rider
- The Dooleys, 1970s pop act
- Noel Edmonds, TV entertainer and presenter
- Julia Fernandez, actress
- Keith Flint (1969–2019), The Prodigy singer
- Bill Fraser, TV actor, The Army Game; ran a sweet shop in Ilford Lane between bookings
- Steven Haberman, actuary and professor
- Georgina Hale, actress
- Jon Hare, computer game designer
- Eva Hart, one of the last remaining survivors of the sinking of the RMS Titanic on 15 April 1912; died on 14 February 1996
- John Carmel Heenan, cardinal and Archbishop of Westminster
- Jane Holland, poet, performer and novelist
- Ian Holm, actor, known as Bilbo Baggins in the Lord of the Rings movie trilogy
- Nasser Hussain, England international cricketer and team captain
- Ronald Hutton, historian, attended Ilford County High School
- Dev Hynes (born 1985), singer and record producer
- Paul Ince, England international footballer
- Frazer Irving, comic book artist
- Jessie J, singer-songwriter, attended Mayfield High School
- Reece James (born 1999), Chelsea F.C. footballer
- Anna Karen (1936-2022), South African born actress who lived in Ilford
- Hazel Keech, British-Mauritian actress who predominantly works in Bollywood.
- Mimi Keene, actress
- Kathy Kirby, singer
- Sophie Lawrence, actress
- Jane Leeves, actor, best known as Daphne Moon in Frasier
- Kenneth Lefever, civil servant
- Denise Levertov, poet
- Stephen Lewis, actor who lived in Wanstead Nursing Home until his death in 2015
- Otto Liebermann (1898–1974), scientist, died in Ilford
- Richard Littlejohn, journalist
- Louise Lombard (born 1970), actress
- Frank Miller Lupton (1854–1888), governor of Bahr el Ghazal province, Sudan (1881–1884)
- Raymond Lygo, admiral
- Victor Maddern, actor
- Sean Maguire, singer and actor
- Kevin Maher, footballer
- Tony Minson, virologist and pro-vice-chancellor of the University of Cambridge
- Peter R. Newman, screenwriter
- Geoffrey Orme, screenwriter for television and film
- Tamzin Outhwaite, actress
- Ruth Pitter, poet
- Jenny Powell, TV presenter
- Kathleen Raine, poet and critic
- David Rappaport, actor
- Ruth Rendell (1930–2015), novelist, author of thrillers
- Ian Ridpath, astronomy writer and broadcaster
- Amanda Rosario, British-Indian actress predominantly working in Bollywood
- Fauja Singh, centenarian athletics record holder
- Maggie Smith, actress
- Louise Wener (born 1966), Sleeper singer and author, attended Beal High School near Gants Hill
- Chris Willsher, writer, performer and singer with Bus Station Loonies
