= Brian Butterworth =

British professor of cognitive neuropsychology (born 1944)

- Born: Brian Lewis Butterworth; 3 January 1944 (age 82)
- Education: Merton College, Oxford
- Spouse: Diana Laurillard
- Scientific career
- Fields: Mathematical psychology, Dyslexia and Speech science
- Workplaces: Institute of Cognitive Neuroscience at University College London

Notes
- Fellow of the British Academy

Brian Lewis Butterworth FBA (born 3 January 1944) is emeritus professor of cognitive neuropsychology in the Institute of Cognitive Neuroscience at University College London, England. His research has ranged from speech errors and pauses, short-term memory deficits, reading and the dyslexias both in alphabetic scripts and Chinese, and mathematics and dyscalculia. He has also pioneered educational neuroscience, notably in the study of learners with special educational needs (Educational Neuroscience, 2013).

== Education ==
He read psychology and philosophy at Oxford University (1963–1966). He completed an MA on Gödel's theorem at Sussex University (1967–1968) under the direction of Peter Nidditch, and a PhD in psycholinguistics at UCL supervised by Frieda Goldman-Eisler, the first professor of psycholinguistics in the UK.

== Psycholinguistics ==
His early work, following Goldman-Eisler's pioneering studies, explored the functions of pauses in speech. He confirmed that pauses are required for both long-range planning and lexical selection. He went on to show that gestures and glances were also coordinated with planning and with turn-taking in naturally occurring conversations, So, for example, certain gestures—'iconic' gestures— similarly both anticipate lexical selection and resist interruption. Pauses at the ends of sentences both mark the completion of a syntactic plan, and are loci for turn-changing, therefore a speaker who wished to retain the turn would indicate this by turning away or by continuing to gesture. This led to a novel approach to aphasia, and showed that even a fluent jargon-aphasic patient plans in the usual way, with pauses and gestures in the usual locations, and the neologisms created to fill lexical gaps. His study of the pauses in the speech of one neurological patient with short-term memory deficit revealed entirely normal speech. This resolved a current controversy as to whether short-term memory has an input or an output locus. The latter hypothesis implies that speech should be affected.

In 1984, he diagnosed President Ronald Reagan on the basis of speech errors in his presidential re-election speeches in an article in the Sunday Times as having Alzheimer's disease ten years before this was formally identified.

== Reading and the dyslexias ==
His distinctive contribution to reading and dyslexia research was to show that John Marshall's 'two route model of reading' could explain the dyslexias in both alphabetic and logographic orthographies such as Chinese and Japanese. According to the two-route model, the reader simultaneously processes words as a whole and the components of words—letters in alphabetic scripts, and radicals in Chinese. Reading fluency depends on whether the outcomes of these two processes are compatible. In English, they often are not: -INT is pronounced one way in MINT and another way in PINT. This incompatibility slows down reading that word. He showed that this applies also to Chinese, as he showed with his student, Yin Wengang and Japanese with colleague Taeko Wydell. He also showed that each route could be separately impaired in development—developmental dyslexia—and in brain damage—acquired dyslexia—again in both alphabetic and logographic scripts. To learn an alphabetic script, it is critical to learn how each letter is pronounced—this is sometimes called 'phonics'—but of course orthographies such as English there are many exceptions that just need to be learned. For example, the letter C is pronounced differently in COT, MICE, AND CHURCH. He showed that the phonic route could be selectively impaired or spared in both learners and neurological patients. In development, learners who are unable to parse a whole syllable into their component phonemes will have great difficulty learning to read, and will have to rely on recognizing words as a whole, as he was the first to show. This would not be a problem for learning to read Japanese, and he reported a young man of English-speaking parents, raised in Japan, severely dyslexic in English but a superior reader of Japanese. His siblings were fluent readers in both languages.

== Mathematical cognition ==
Butterworth is one of the founding fathers of the modern approach to mathematical cognition. In 1989, when he started in this area, the few people who were working on it operated in disciplinary silos. A comprehensive review of research on number abilities in animals made no mention of humans and developmental psychologists ignored the brain. He changed this by bringing together a range of disciplines. The central idea is that human numerical abilities are based on an inherited mechanism specialized for extracting numerosity information from the environment. The idea of an inherited domain-specific basis for arithmetical development is now widely accepted. In his book The Mathematical Brain (1999) he proposed the idea of a 'number module,' an innate, domain-specific mechanism that extracts numerosity from the environment and represents it abstractly, independently of modality and mode of presentation. This representation is used in an adaptive way, by entering into combinatorial processes isomorphic with arithmetical operations, including =, <, >, +, -, x, etc. He argued that this is the foundation of arithmetic development. Learners for whom this mechanism is defective or inefficient, will have trouble learning arithmetic, but not necessarily other branches of mathematics.

Butterworth showed using data from neurological patients and from brain imaging that there is a specialized brain network that underpins this mechanism. The relevant findings were brought together in Dyscalculia: From Science to Education.

That we share this mechanism with other creatures is the theme of his book Can Fish Count? What Animals Reveal About Our Uniquely Mathematical Minds (2022).

== Subitizing experiment ==
Subitizing concerns the ability to instantly identify the number of items without counting. Collections of four or below are usually subitised with collections of larger numbers being counted. Brian Butterworth designed an experiment that ran as an interactive exhibit at the Explore-At-Bristol science museum to find whether subitising differed between women and men. Participants were asked to estimate as fast as they could between one and 10 dots and press the answer on a touch screen. How long they took—their reaction time—was measured. Over 18,000 people took part—the largest number ever to take part in a mathematical cognition experiment. He announced his finding that women were better than men at subitising at the British Association for the Advancement of Science's 2003 annual science festival. He also found that people were six per cent faster on calculating the number of dots if they were presented on the left side of the screen (and so right sided lateralised in the brain) but only if there were five or more and so counted.

== Publications ==
=== The Mathematical Brain ===
(1999). London: Macmillan. ISBN 978-0-333-76610-1

Published in the same year in the US as What Counts New York: Simon & Schuster. ISBN 978-0-684-85417-5

Italian translation. Intelligenza Matematica. (1999). Milano: Rizzoli. ISBN 978-88-7378-013-7
Japanese translation (Naze sugaku ga tokui na hito to nigate na hito ga irunoka? (Why are some people good, but others bad at maths?) (2001). Tokyo: Shufunotomosha.
Swedish translation Den matematiska människan. (2000). Stockholm: Wahlström & Widstrand. ISBN 978-91-46-17406-6
Chinese translation (2004). 200X Orient Publishing Company (Chinese)

=== Other books ===
Powell A., Butterworth B. (1971). Marked for life: a criticism of assessment at universities. London, Anarchist Group ISBN 978-0-901807-01-4

Butterworth B. (1980). Language Production Volume 1: Speech and talk Academic Pr ISBN 978-0-12-147501-7

Butterworth B. (1983). Language Production Volume 2: Development, Writing and Other Language Processes Academic Pr ISBN 978-0-12-147502-4

Butterworth B. Comrie B. Dahl O. (1984). Explanations for Language Universals Mouton De Gruyter ISBN 978-3-11-009797-9

Mareschal, D., Butterworth, B., & Tolmie, A. (2013) (ed.s). Educational Neuroscience. Chichester, West Sussex: Wiley Blackwell; 2013.

=== Dyscalculia ===
Butterworth, B. & Yeo, D. (2004). Dyscalculia Guidance Helping Pupils with Specific Learning Difficulties in Maths. David Fulton ISBN 978-0-7087-1152-1

Butterworth, B. (2019). Dyscalculia: from science to education. Abingdon, Oxon: Routledge. ISBN 978-1-138-68861-2 (pbk)

Italian translation (2021) Discalculia: Dalla scienzia all'insegnamento. Florence, Hogrefe. ISBN 978-88-98542-55-0

=== Speech ===
- Butterworth B. (1975). Hesitation and Semantic Planning in speech. Journal of Psycholinguistic Research 4: 75–87.
- Butterworth B. (1979). Hesitation and the Production of Verbal Paraphasias and Neologisms in Jargon Aphasia. Brain and Language, 8, 133–161.
- Butterworth B. (1981). Speech errors: old data in search of new theories. (pp. 627–662). In A. Cutler (ed.) Slips of the Tongue and Language Production: Berlin: Mouton.
- Butterworth B. (1983). Introduction: A Brief Review of Methods of Studying Language Production. (pp. 1–17). In B. Butterworth, B. Comrie and Ö Dahl (eds.) Explanations for Language Universals: Berlin: Mouton.
- Butterworth, B.; Howard, D.; McLoughlin, P. (1984). "The semantic deficit in aphasia: The relationship between semantic errors in auditory comprehension and picture naming". Neuropsychologia. 22 (4): 409–426. doi:10.1016/0028-3932(84)90036-8. PMID 6207456. S2CID 8143719.
- Butterworth, B.; Howard, D. (1987). "Paragrammatisms". Cognition. 26 (1): 1–37. doi:10.1016/0010-0277(87)90012-6. PMID 3608394. S2CID 235331431.
- Butterworth, B. (1992). "Disorders of phonological encoding". Cognition. 42 (1–3): 261–286. doi:10.1016/0010-0277(92)90045-j. PMID 1582159. S2CID 14838624.
- Butterworth, B. (1994). "Disorders of Sentence Production". Philosophical Transactions of the Royal Society B: Biological Sciences. 346 (1315): 55–61. Bibcode:1994RSPTB.346...55B. doi:10.1098/rstb.1994.0128. PMID 7886154.

=== Memory ===
- Shallice, T.; Butterworth, B. (1977). "Short-term memory impairment and spontaneous speech". Neuropsychologia. 15 (6): 729–735. doi:10.1016/0028-3932(77)90002-1. PMID 600367. S2CID 1020321.
- Butterworth, B.; Campbell, R.; Howard, D. (1986). "The uses of short-term memory: A case study". The Quarterly Journal of Experimental Psychology. A, Human Experimental Psychology. 38 (4): 705–737. doi:10.1080/14640748608401622. PMID 3809577. S2CID 6458322. PDF

=== Reading and dyslexia ===
- Campbell, R.; Butterworth, B. (1985). "Phonological dyslexia and dysgraphia in a highly literate subject: A developmental case with associated deficits of phonemic processing and awareness". The Quarterly Journal of Experimental Psychology. A, Human Experimental Psychology. 37 (3): 435–475. doi:10.1080/14640748508400944. PMID 4048548. S2CID 27485671.
- Yin, Wengang & Butterworth, B. (1998). "Chinese pure alexia". Aphasiology. 12 (1): 65–76. doi:10.1080/02687039808249444. OCLC 198414365.
- Wydell, T. N.; Butterworth, B. (1999). "A case study of an English-Japanese bilingual with monolingual dyslexia". Cognition. 70 (3): 273–305. doi:10.1016/S0010-0277(99)00016-5. PMID 10384738. S2CID 205872303.
- Butterworth, B.; Wengang, Y. (1991). "The Universality of Two Routines for Reading: Evidence from Chinese Dyslexia". Proceedings of the Royal Society B: Biological Sciences. 246 (1315): 91–95. Bibcode:1991RSPSB.246...91B. doi:10.1098/rspb.1991.0129. PMID 1684672. S2CID 27746068.
- Yin, Wengang, & Butterworth B. (1992). Deep and Surface Dyslexia in Chinese in Chen, H-C. & Tzeng, O. J. L. (eds.) Language Processing in Chinese. Amsterdam: North Holland/Elsevier. (1 MB)
- Shibahara, N.; Zorzi, M.; Hill, M. P.; Wydell, T.; Butterworth, B. (2003). "Semantic effects in word naming: Evidence from English and Japanese Kanji". The Quarterly Journal of Experimental Psychology Section A. 56 (2): 263–286. doi:10.1080/02724980244000369. PMID 12613564. S2CID 7623123. PDF

=== Mathematics ===
- Cipolotti L, Butterworth B, Denes G. (1991) "A specific deficit for numbers in a case of dense acalculia" Brain.; 114-2619-37
- Cipolotti, L.; Warrington, E. K.; Butterworth, B. (1995). "Selective impairment in manipulating Arabic numerals". Cortex. 31 (1): 73–86. doi:10.1016/s0010-9452(13)80106-2. PMID 7540123. S2CID 4476541. PDF
- Butterworth, B. (2001). "What makes a prodigy?". Nature Neuroscience. 4 (1): 11–12. doi:10.1038/82841. PMID 11135636. S2CID 14967746. PDF
- Butterworth, B.; Cappelletti, M.; Kopelman, M. (2001). "Category specificity in reading and writing: The case of number words". Nature Neuroscience. 4 (8): 784–786. doi:10.1038/90484. PMID 11477423. S2CID 1952687. PDF
- Piazza, M.; Mechelli, A.; Butterworth, B.; Price, C. J. (2002). "Are Subitizing and Counting Implemented as Separate or Functionally Overlapping Processes?". NeuroImage. 15 (2): 435–446. doi:10.1006/nimg.2001.0980. PMID 11798277. S2CID 13959500. PDF
- Landerl, K.; Bevan, A.; Butterworth, B. (2004). "Developmental dyscalculia and basic numerical capacities: A study of 8–9-year-old students". Cognition. 93 (2): 99–125. doi:10.1016/j.cognition.2003.11.004. PMID 15147931. S2CID 14205159. PDF
- Gelman, R.; Butterworth, B. (2005). "Number and language: How are they related?". Trends in Cognitive Sciences. 9 (1): 6–10. doi:10.1016/j.tics.2004.11.004. PMID 15639434. S2CID 5978945. PDF
- Butterworth, B. (2005). "The development of arithmetical abilities". Journal of Child Psychology and Psychiatry. 46 (1): 3–18. doi:10.1111/j.1469-7610.2004.00374.x. PMID 15660640. PDF
- Butterworth, B., Varma, S., & Laurillard, D. (2011). "Dyscalculia: From brain to education." Science, 332, 1049–1053. doi: 10.1126/science.1201536
- Butterworth, B., & Walsh, V. (2011). "Neural basis of mathematical cognition." Current Biology, 21 (16), R618-R621. doi:DOI: 10.1016/j.cub.2011.07.005
