= Anthony Neuberger =

British academic

Anthony Neuberger (born 1952) is an academic in the United Kingdom, currently Professor of Finance at Cass Business School. Neuberger has previously held senior positions at other academic institutions including Warwick Business School and London Business School.

== Education and career ==
Neuberger was born in 1952. He attended Westminster School, Trinity College, Cambridge (BA, 1969–73) and the London Business School (MBA, 1983–85; PhD, 1985–91). He held positions at London Business School (1991-2004), Warwick Business School (2004-2013) and joined Cass Business School in 2013.

== Family ==
His father Albert was an academic, and his uncle Herman was a rabbi. His brothers are David (a judge and former UK Supreme Court President), Professor James (a medical doctor), and the late Professor Michael (a biochemist). He is married to Julia Neuberger, a rabbi. The couple have two children, Harriet and Matthew.
