= Scouting and Guiding in Nigeria =

Scouting and Guiding associations in Nigeria

The Scout and Guide movement in Nigeria is served by

- The Nigerian Girl Guides Association, member of the World Association of Girl Guides and Girl Scouts
- Scout Association of Nigeria, member of the World Organization of the Scout Movement

== International Scout units in Nigeria ==
In addition, there are American Boy Scouts in Lagos, linked to the Direct Service branch of the Boy Scouts of America, which supports units around the world. Scout of Nigeria is the largest youth and Adult movement which trains a person to be a responsible citizen and to be a self reliance.
