= Olukunle Akinola =

Nigerian surveyor (1931–2025)

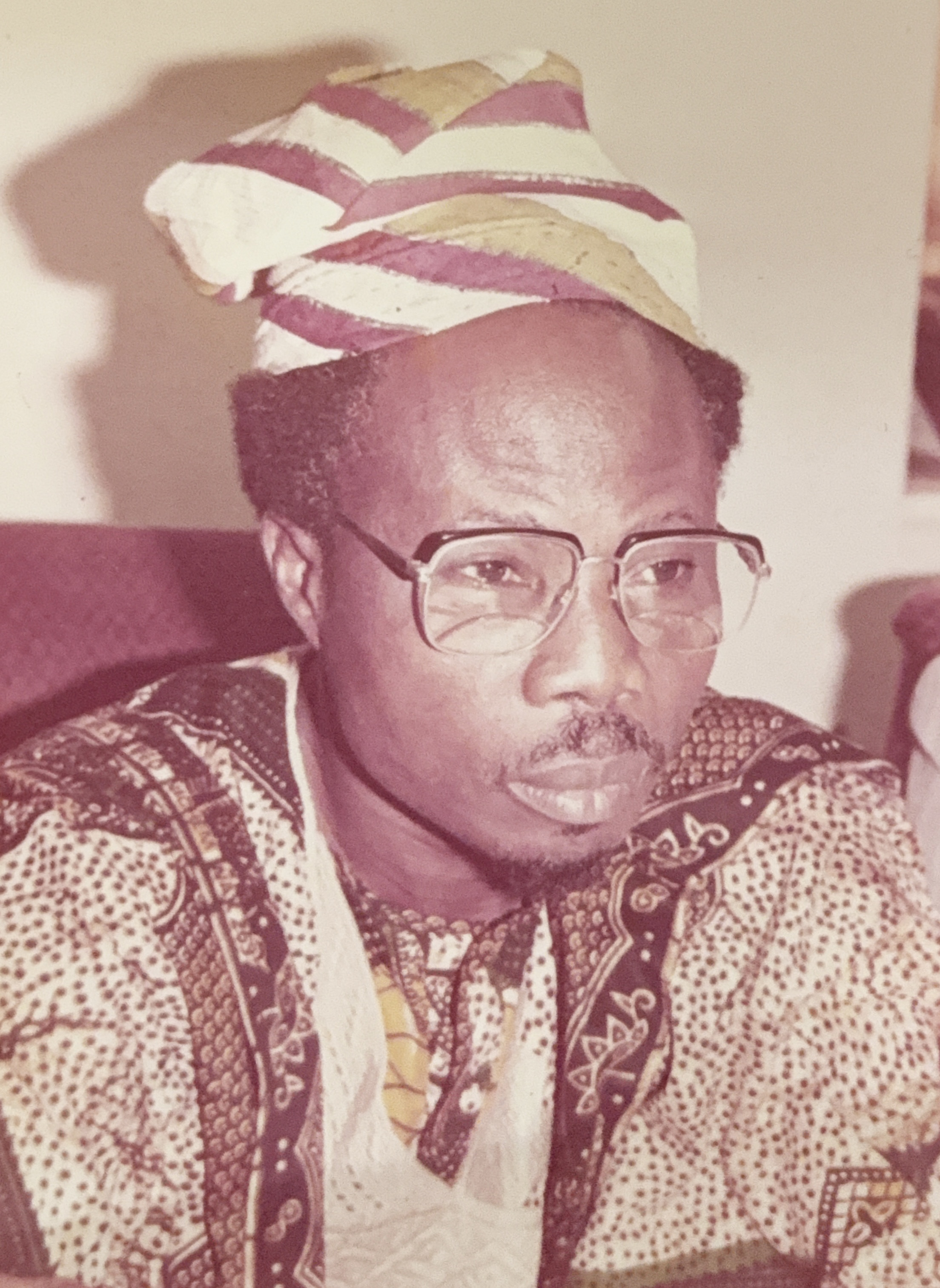
Akinola working in Ilorin, 1985

Chief Olukunle Akinola (31 October 1931 – 11 October 2025) was a Nigerian surveyor and public administrator. He was the first Surveyor-General of Lagos State and oversaw its initial mapping programme after the state’s creation in 1967.

== Early life and education ==
Akinola was born in Ipaja, in the present-day Ayobo-Ipaja Local Council Development Area of Lagos State, then part of the Western Region of Nigeria. His father was a farmer and lay reader in the Anglican Church, while his mother was a petty trader.

He attended St. Andrew's Primary School, Ipaja, before gaining admission to CMS Grammar School, Lagos in 1946, where he completed his studies in 1951. During his school years, Akinola was an active member of the Boys' Scouts, eventually becoming a patrol leader, Following his secondary education, Akinola joined the Federal Ministry of Works and Housing as a junior technical officer.

Akinola later attended the Federal School of Surveying, Oyo (1952–1953), where he received formal training in land surveying. , and pursued further studies at the Nigerian College of Arts, Science and Technology, Enugu; the South-West Essex Technical College, London; and the Geographical Survey Institute, Tokyo, Japan.

In 1964, he became a Chartered Surveyor after passing the final examinations of the Royal Institution of Chartered Surveyors (RICS).

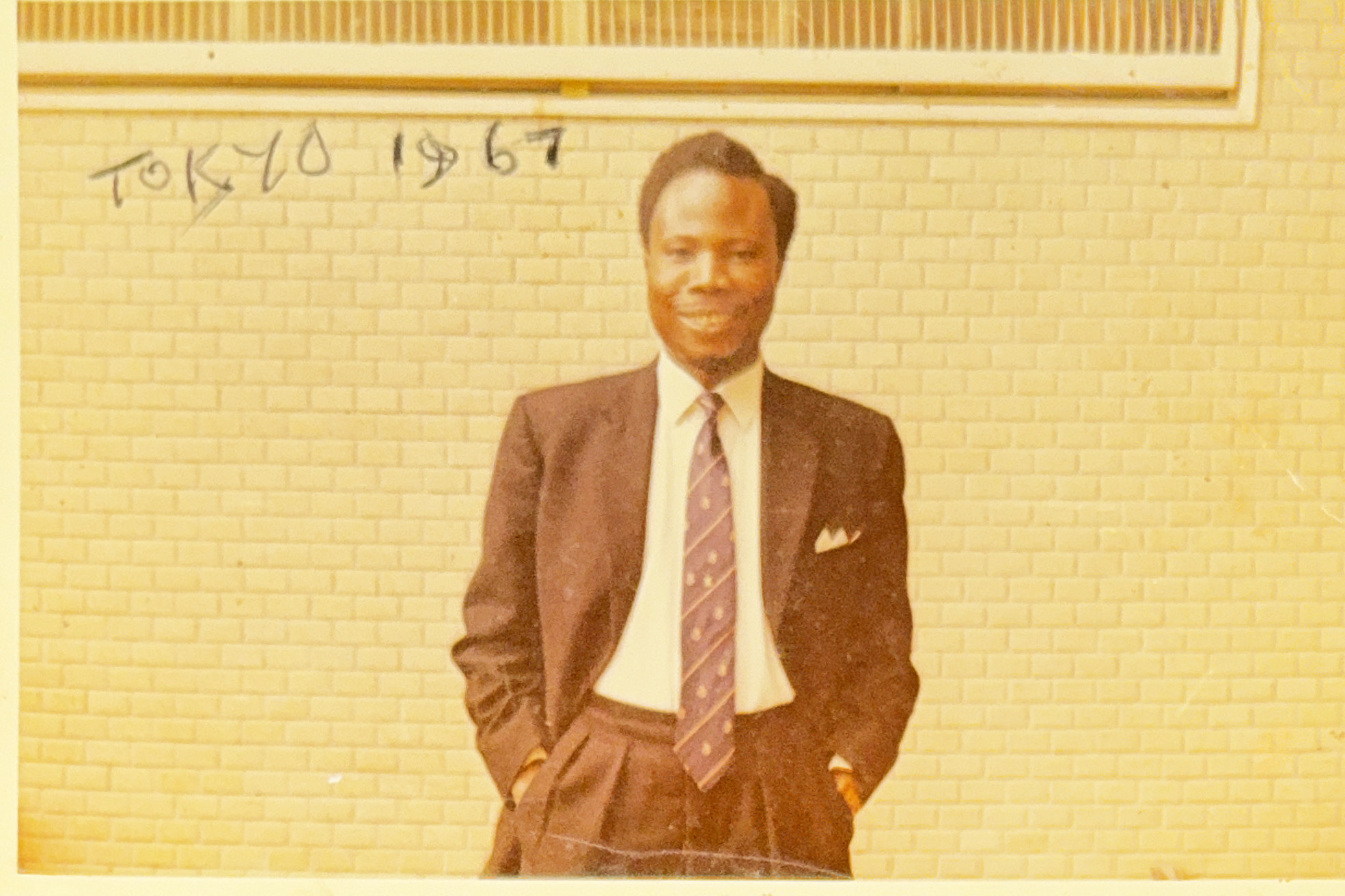
Chief Olukunle Akinola at the Geographical Survey Institute, Tokyo, Japan (1967)

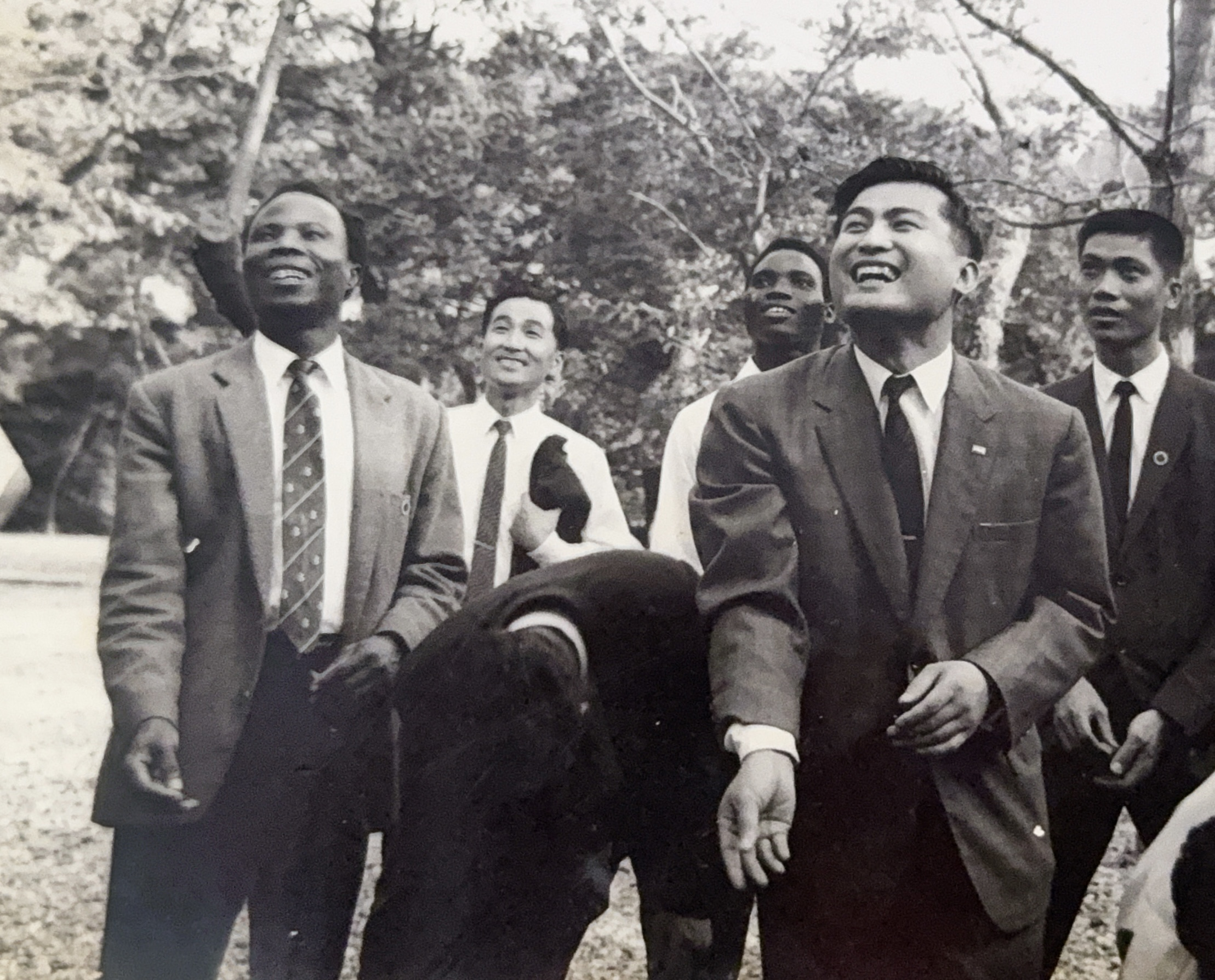
Chief Olukunle Akinola in Tokyo during the 1960s with his classmates.

== Career ==
Akinola joined the Federal Ministry of Works in the 1950s as a surveyor and later transferred to the Lagos State Government after its formation in 1967. He served as Surveyor-General of Lagos State from 1975 to 1987 and subsequently founded a private surveying consultancy.

== Personal life and death ==
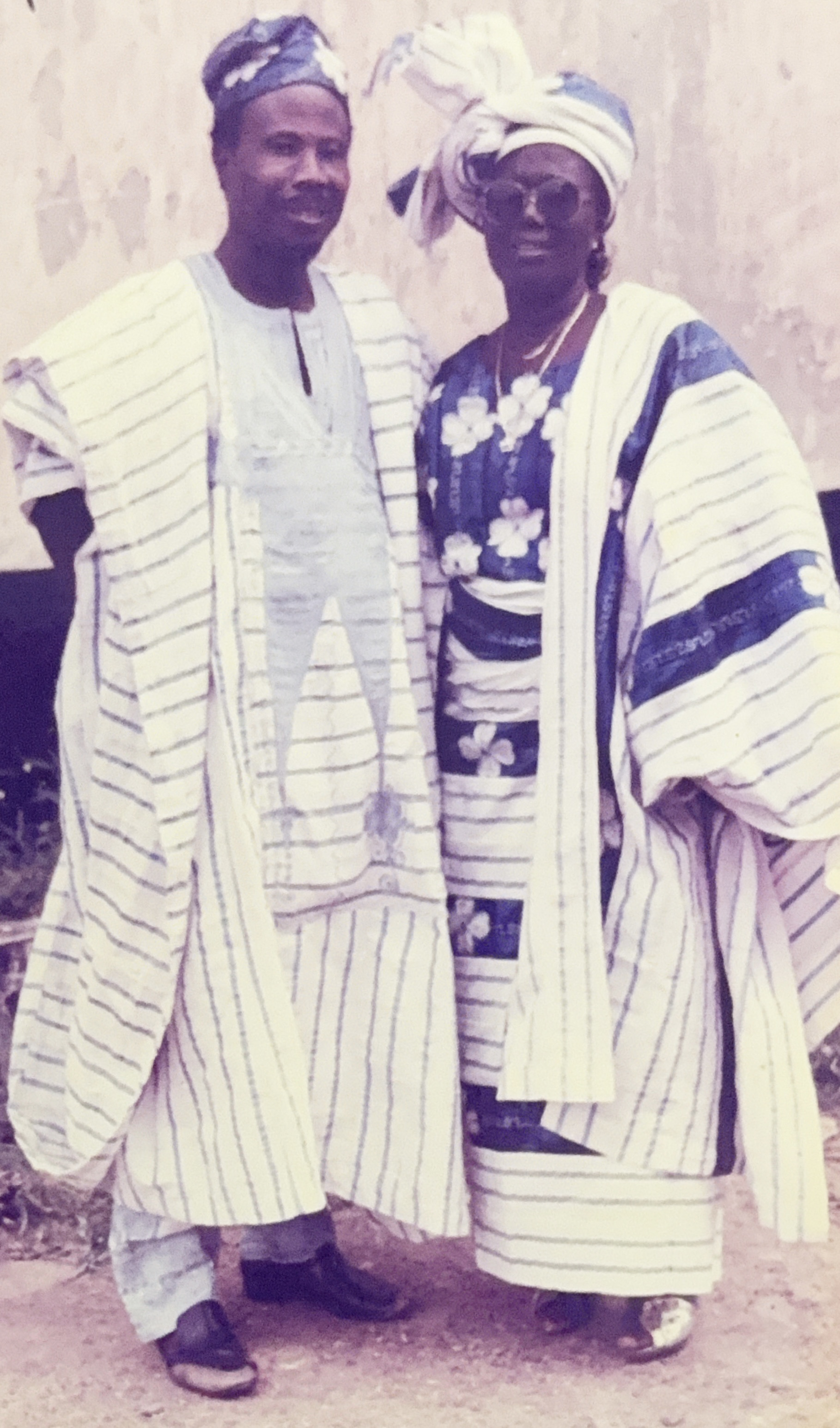
Chief Olukunle Akinola and his wife Grace Folake Akinola.

Akinola married Grace Folake Akinola in 1955. The couple met while he was undergoing training in Ibadan, where Grace attended St Theresa's College. They had six children.

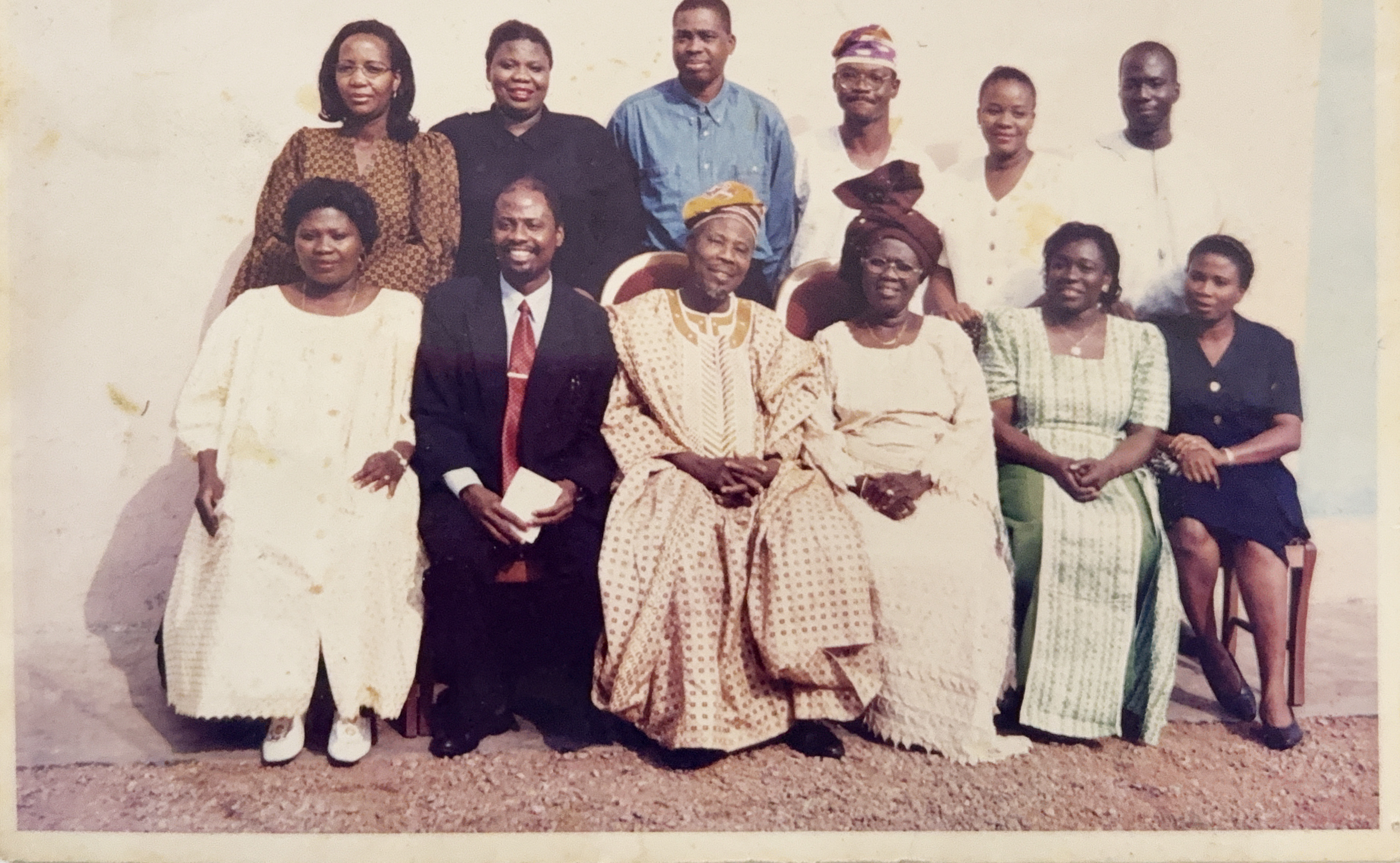
Akinola with his children in 2000 at his estate.

A lifelong Anglican and community leader, Akinola served as President-General of the Christian Unity Band of Nigeria (CUBN) and remained active in church and civic affairs.

Akinola died on 11 October 2025, at the age of 94.
