= T&D =

T&D may refer to:

- T&D Holdings, a Japanese insurance company
- T+D, a magazine of the American Society for Training & Development
- T&D Industries Ltd, a defunct UK firm - see Re T&D Industries plc
- Tease and Denial (Erotic sexual denial), a sexual practice also known as orgasm denial
- The Times and Democrat, a newspaper in Orangeburg, South Carolina, US
- Tralee and Dingle Light Railway, former railway in Ireland
- Transmission and Distribution - see Electric power transmission
- Transposition and docking, formally Transposition, docking, and extraction, a maneuver performed in space flight
- Training and development, a function of human resource management
