= Reddaway =

Reddaway may refer to:

- Reddaway (trucking company), American subsidiary of YRC Worldwide
- David Reddaway (born 1953), British former ambassador to Turkey
- John Reddaway (1916–1990), British diplomat
- Norman Reddaway (1918–1999), British civil servant and diplomat
- William Fiddian Reddaway (1872–1949), English historian
