= Marie Coates =

British biologist

Marie Evelyn Coates
- Born: 19 March 1916; Wanstead
- Died: 31 May 2004 (aged 88)
- Education: Ilford County High School; University of Reading
- Scientific career
- Workplaces: National Institute for Research in Dairying; Glaxo Laboratories
- Thesis: Methods of biological assay, using chicks, of vitamins of the B complex (1949)

Marie Coates (19 March 1916 – 31 May 2004) was a British biologist who was an expert in gnotobiosis. She served as President of the Nutrition Society. She used plastic isolators to research the impact of gut microbes on food additives.

== Early life and education ==
Coates grew up in Wanstead. She attended Ilford County High School. As a teenager she became interested in horseriding, and used to take excursions into Epping Forest. She trained in pharmacy and in 1934 completed the Royal Pharmaceutical Society apprenticeship at a hospital. After completing her qualifications she joined Glaxo Laboratories, which was based in Greenford. Here she developed chick bioassays to study B vitamins, and eventually earned a doctorate.

== Research and career ==
The Nutrition Laboratories of the Royal Pharmaceutical Society moved to the National Institute for Research in Dairying during World War II. Catherine Coward, then Director of the Nutrition Laboratories, recruited Coates to the laboratory, where she used chicks to study vitamins. She became interest in gut flora, and was involved with establishing the gnotobiology Unit. The Gnotobiology Unit joined the nutrition and microbiology departments. Her research considered the use of plastic film isolators to create germ-free environments to study the impact of gut microbes on food additives.

In 1981 she retired from the National Institute for Research in Dairying and moved to the University of Surrey as a Senior Research Fellow. She retired in 1989.

== Select publications ==
- Coates, M. E.; Fuller, R.; Harrison, G. F.; Lev, M.; Suffolk, S. F. (February 1963). "A comparison of the growth of chicks in the Gustafsson germ-free apparatus and in a conventional environment, with and without dietary supplements of penicillin". British Journal of Nutrition. 17 (1): 141–150. doi:10.1079/bjn19630015. ISSN 0007-1145. PMID 14021819. S2CID 27017590.
- Coates, Marie E.; Ford, J. E.; Harrison, G. F. (September 1968). "Intestinal synthesis of vitamins of the B complex in chicks". British Journal of Nutrition. 22 (3): 493–500. doi:10.1079/bjn19680057. ISSN 0007-1145. PMID 5698069. S2CID 14265121.
- Coates, Marie E. (1968). The germ-free animal in research. London. ISBN 978-0121771508.

== Personal life ==
Coates was married to Leonard George Goodwin in 1940.
