= Geoffrey Tyler =

Geoffrey Tyler OBE (born 10 June 1920 – 28 April 2012) was an English educationalist.

He was born in Ilford, Essex. A keen composer and singer, he has published books of songs for children.

== Education ==
He attended Ilford County High School, Manchester University and University College, Oxford.

== Career ==
- Armament Supply Officer, Admiralty HQ, 1938–46
- Assistant Master, Barrow Grammar School, 1951–53
- Administrative Assistant, School of Education, Manchester University, 1953–55
- Professional Assistant, Cheshire LEA, 1956–57
- Assistant Education Officer (Schools), Wiltshire LEA, 1957–61
- Further Education Officer, Buckinghamshire LEA, 1961–65
- Vice-Principal, Mid-Essex Technical College, Chelmsford, 1965–69
- Principal, Ealing Technical College, London, 1969–75
- Director, East Sussex College of Higher Education, 1976–78
- Associate Director, Brighton Polytechnic, 1978–79
- Governor, then Vice-Chairman, then Chairman, Eastbourne College of Further Education, 1979–93
- Chairman of Corporation, Eastbourne College of Arts and Technology, 1993–2001
- Vice-Chairman, Sussex Downs College, 2001–2007
- Appointed OBE, 2004
- Sheriff Woody {Toy Story musical at Disney Cruise}
