= Brian Green (barrister) =

English barrister

Brian Green KC (born 1956) is an English barrister.

He was born in Ilford and attended Ilford County High School and St. Edmund Hall, Oxford. After gaining a double first from Oxford University, he was a lecturer at LSE, 1978–85 and a tutor at St. Edmund Hall, 1978–80.

He was called to the Bar in 1980 and appointed a Queen's Counsel in 1997.

In 2009, he won an important Court of Appeal case on pensions.

Chambers and Partners Directory rate him as a star individual for traditional chancery and for pensions work, and Band 1 for Offshore work. He was awarded Chancery QC of the Year 2006 Chambers Bar Awards and Barrister of the Year 2007 at the STEP Private Client Awards .
