= Roland Dobbs =

British physicist

(Edwin) Roland Dobbs (2 December 1924 – 24 October 2016) was a British physicist, best known for his work in physical acoustics.

== Education ==
He was educated at Ilford County High School, Queen Elizabeth's School, Barnet and University College London. After gaining First Class Honours in Physics, he was called up for radar research for the Admiralty working there from 1943 to 1946. He returned to University College in 1946, completing a PhD: 'The Viscosity of Liquid Alkali Metals' in 1949. In 1977 he was awarded a D.Sc.

== Career ==
He was lecturer in Physics at Queen Mary and Westfield College (1949–1958), Fulbright Scholar in applied mathematics (1958–1959) and Associate Professor of Physics (1959–1960) at Brown University, AEI Fellow at the Cavendish Laboratory, University of Cambridge (1960–1964), Professor and Head of Department of Physics, University of Lancaster (1964–1973), Head of Department of Physics at Bedford College, University of London (1973–1985) and Hildred Carlile Professor (1973–1990). Following the merger of Bedford and Royal Holloway College, he was Head of Department of Physics, Royal Holloway and Bedford New College, 1985-90. On his retirement, he became Emeritus Professor.

He held several visiting Professorships at Brown University, Rhode Island. U.S.A., Wayne State University, Michigan, U.S.A., University of Tokyo, Japan, University of Delhi, India and Cornell University, N.Y., U.S.A.

He was a member of the Physics Committee of the Science Research Council and of its Nuclear Physics Board, and a member of the Physics Committee of the Science and Engineering Research Council. He was Convener, Standing Conference of Professors of Physics of Great Britain, 1985–1988.

His research interests were in various areas of condensed matter physics: metals, superconductors, condensed inert gases, and latterly Helium 3 as a Fermi liquid and superfluid. He was noted for his research on the physics of helium-3, including its behavior as a superfluid, and published what was regarded as the definitive monograph 'Helium 3' in its various states in 2000 (Oxford University Press). Other publications include: Solid Helium Three (Oxford University Press): 1993, Electricity and Magnetism (Routledge & Kegan Paul):1984 and Basic Electromagnetism (Chapman & Hall): 1993.

At Lancaster University he was the Foundation Principal of the County College for two years before the building of the College was completed.

He died on 24 October 2016 at the age of 91.
