= David Neuberger, Baron Neuberger of Abbotsbury =

English judge (born 1948)

The Right Honourable The Lord Neuberger of Abbotsbury GBS PC HonFRS
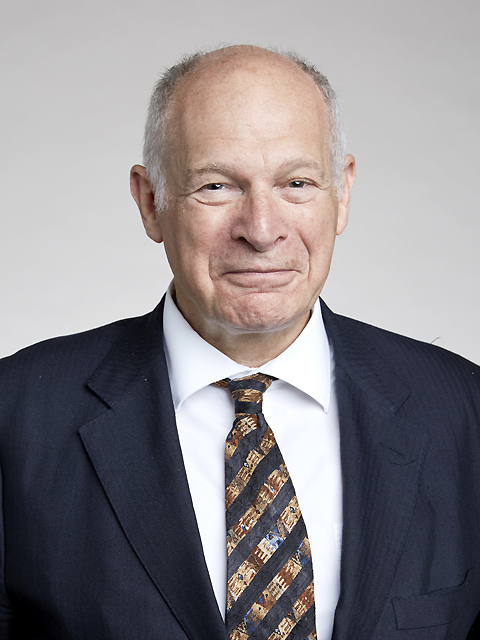
- Neuberger in 2017

President of the Supreme Court of the United Kingdom
- In office 1 October 2012 – 4 September 2017
- Nominated by: Kenneth Clarke
- Appointed by: Elizabeth II
- Deputy: The Lord Hope of Craighead; The Baroness Hale of Richmond
- Preceded by: The Lord Phillips of Worth Matravers
- Succeeded by: The Baroness Hale of Richmond

Master of the Rolls
- In office 1 October 2009 – 30 September 2012
- Preceded by: The Lord Clarke of Stone-cum-Ebony
- Succeeded by: Lord Dyson

Lord of Appeal in Ordinary
- In office 11 January 2007 – 30 September 2009
- Preceded by: The Lord Nicholls of Birkenhead
- Succeeded by: Lord Dyson (as Justice of the Supreme Court)

Lord Justice of Appeal
- In office 12 January 2004 – 11 January 2007

Non-Permanent Judge of the Court of Final Appeal of Hong Kong
- Incumbent
- Assumed office 1 March 2009
- Appointed by: Donald Tsang

Member of the House of Lords
- Lord Temporal
- Lord of Appeal in Ordinary; 11 January 2007

Personal details
- Born: David Edmond Neuberger; 10 January 1948 (age 78) Paddington, London, England
- Spouse: Angela Holdsworth
- Children: 3
- Parents: Albert Neuberger; Lilian Dreyfus
- Education: Westminster School
- Alma mater: Christ Church, Oxford (MA)
- Occupation: Judge
- Profession: Barrister

Chinese name
- Chinese: 廖柏嘉
Transcriptions
Yue: Cantonese
- Yale Romanization: Liuh Paak Gā
- Jyutping: Liu^{6} Paak^{3} Gaa^{1}

David Edmond Neuberger, Baron Neuberger of Abbotsbury (/ˈnjuːbɜːrɡər/; born 10 January 1948) is an English judge. He served as President of the Supreme Court of the United Kingdom from 2012 to 2017. He was a Lord of Appeal in Ordinary until the House of Lords' judicial functions were transferred to the new Supreme Court in 2009, at which point he became Master of the Rolls, the second most senior judge in England and Wales. Neuberger was appointed to the Supreme Court, as its President, in 2012. He now serves as a Non-Permanent Judge of the Hong Kong Court of Final Appeal and formerly served as the Chair of the High Level Panel of Legal Experts on Media Freedom. He was appointed to the Singapore International Commercial Court in 2018.

== Early life ==
Neuberger was born on 10 January 1948, the son of Albert Neuberger, Professor of Chemical Pathology at St Mary's Hospital, University of London, and his wife, Lilian. He was born Jewish originating from Germany. His uncle was the noted rabbi Herman N. Neuberger. All three of his brothers are or were professors: James Neuberger is Professor of Medicine at the University of Birmingham, Michael Neuberger was Professor of Molecular Immunology at the University of Cambridge, while Anthony Neuberger is Professor in Finance at Warwick Business School, University of Warwick.

He was educated first at The Hall School, Hampstead, then Westminster School, and studied chemistry at Christ Church, Oxford.

== Career ==
After graduation, Neuberger worked at the merchant bank, N M Rothschild & Sons, from 1970 to 1973. Neuberger was called to the Bar at Lincoln's Inn in 1974, where he became a Bencher in 1993. He became a Queen's Counsel in 1987. He was a Recorder from 1990 to 1 October 1996, when he was appointed a High Court Judge in the Chancery Division and received the customary knighthood.

In 2001, he was made Supervisory Chancery Judge of Midland, Wales and Chester, and of the Western Circuits, a post he held until 12 January 2004, when he was appointed a Lord Justice of Appeal and a member of the Privy Council.

Since 2005, he has been co-chair (with Richard Susskind) of ITAC (Lord Chancellor's Information Technology and Courts Committee).

On 11 January 2007, he succeeded Lord Nicholls of Birkenhead as a Lord of Appeal in Ordinary and was made a life peer as Baron Neuberger of Abbotsbury, of Abbotsbury in the County of Dorset, and introduced in the House of Lords on 15 January 2007 between Lord Bingham of Cornhill and his sister-in-law, Baroness Neuberger.

His rise to the Court of Appeal and then to the House of Lords is one of the quickest in recent times. Although Lord Devlin was, at 55, even younger on his own appointment to the House of Lords in 1960, Lord Neuberger was the youngest sitting Law Lord.

It was announced on 23 July 2009 that he would be appointed the next Master of the Rolls, succeeding Lord Clarke of Stone-cum-Ebony, who became one of the inaugural Justices of the Supreme Court on the retirement of Lord Scott of Foscote. This appointment took effect on 1 October 2009.

Between 2006 and 2007, he led an investigation for the Bar Council into widening access to the Bar. He also served on the Panel on Fair Access to the Professions, led by former Health Secretary Alan Milburn, which reported in July 2009. Other Panel members included Trevor Phillips, head of the Commission for Equalities and Human Rights, Michael Grade, Chairman of ITV, and Martin Rees, Astronomer Royal.

In July 2012, it was announced that Lord Neuberger would succeed Lord Phillips of Worth Matravers as President of the Supreme Court, which post he took up on 1 October 2012. In February 2017, it was announced that Lord Neuberger would retire "in the Summer" from his role in the Supreme Court.

== After UK judicial retirement ==
In 2017 Lord Neuberger served as Treasurer of Lincoln's Inn.

In 2018 he was appointed to the Singapore International Commercial Court for a period of three years from 5 January 2018. He has been reappointed and serves currently as at August 2024.

In 2019 Lord Neuberger advised the Post Office's defence against the claims by 555 sub postmasters that faults in the Post Office's Horizon IT had resulted in the wrongful prosecutions - a key part of the British Post Office scandal. He advised the Post Office in writing that there were reasonable grounds to apply for the judge in the group litigation to “recuse” himself (withdraw). The advice received much negative publicity, as did the subsequent evidence of Lord Grabiner about it. The judge did not recuse himself and the challenge was unsuccessful.

Lord Neuberger now sits as a voting cross-bench member of the House of Lords and was the Chair of the High-Level Panel of Legal Experts on Media Freedom, an independent body convened at the request of the UK and Canadian governments, until his resignation in August 2024.

== Controversial presence on the Hong Kong Court of Final Appeal ==
=== 2009 to August 2024 ===
Lord Neuberger was appointed a Non-Permanent Judge of the Hong Kong Court of Final Appeal in 2009 and continues in that role. In 2018 he was decorated with the Gold Bauhinia Star. UK judges serving on the Hong Kong judiciary had come under increasing criticism in the UK due to Hong Kong's national security laws. Tom Tugendhat, as chairman of the UK's parliamentary foreign affairs select committee in July 2020 questioned whether UK judges ought to continue to serve in this way.

On 6 January 2021 the Chief Justice of the Hong Kong Court of Final Appeal, Geoffrey Ma Tao-Li, retired. Lord Neuberger delivered (remotely) a farewell address in which he emphasised the demanding nature of the task of upholding and defending the independence of the judiciary in circumstances where media and public figures criticise the judiciary in “very blunt terms.” In his valedictory Reply, Chief Justice Ma explained his understanding of judicial independence with an emphasis on the apolitical discharge of judicial duties. He thanked the Non-Permanent Judges for their perspectives and contributions from other common law jurisdictions, and described their presence as “beneficial to the community.”

By the spring of 2022 serving members of the UK Supreme Court, Lord Hodge and Lord Reed, resigned from the Hong Kong judicial panel and criticised the state of civil liberty following the 2020 Hong Kong national security law. The decision to resign was supported by the Foreign Secretary, Liz Truss. At the time, aside from Lord Neuberger, other (retired) British judges continued their panel membership, namely Lord Collins, Lord Hoffman, Lord Phillips, Lord Sumption and Lord Walker. These six judges issued a joint statement in support of their continued panel participation. The reason given was the decision to support the work of the Hong Kong appellate courts in maintaining the rule of law and in reviewing the acts of the executive on the basis that this was in the interest of the people of Hong Kong.

In March 2024 further impending restrictions on the legal profession were the subject of an expression of serious concern by the International Bar Association’s Human Rights Institute (IBAHRI). These restrictions were contained in the Hong Kong Safeguarding National Security Law (SNS Law). In May 2024 The Committee for Freedom in Hong Kong Foundation argued foreign judges should not sit in Hong Kong or lend their prestige to the Hong Kong Court. On the 6 June 2024 Lords Collins and Sumption resigned from the Hong Kong judicial panel. Hong Kong Chief Executive, John Lee, regretted these resignations and emphasised the independence of the judges from interference. In the week following these resignations, Lord Neuberger resisted pressure to resign. Lords Phillips and Hoffman continued also to serve. Lord Falconer of Thornton described non-resignation as “untenable”. At this point the Jimmy Lai trial was ongoing.

=== August 2024 onwards ===
On Monday 12 August 2024, the Hong Kong Court of Final Appeal upheld the conviction and imprisonment of 76 year old British citizen and democracy campaigner Jimmy Lai, for taking part in an unauthorised procession in 2019. This decision was described as "unjust" by Lord Patten, the last British governor of Hong Kong. Lord Neuberger was a member of the court. This created a hostile uproar in the British press: the trial was described as an insult to justice and Lord Neuberger's participation as giving the Hong Kong authorities "a veneer of legitimacy." Letters to the Times from distinguished lawyers continued the debate as to whether Lord Neuberger ought morally to resign from the court. Michael Thomas KC SC insisted not. Derek Wood KC expressed the view Lord Neuberger should reconsider his position.

On 9 February 2026, 78 year old Jimmy Lai (alongside six others who received lower sentences) was sentenced to punishment of 20 years’ imprisonment, having been declared guilty of breaching China’s national security laws by colluding with foreign powers.

=== Period of recent Hong Kong appointments ===
In March 2021 Lord Neuberger was reported in the legal press as agreeing to a further three-year term expiring in February 2024. The Chief Executive of Hong Kong extended the appointment of Lord Neuberger for a further three years commencing on 1 March 2024.

== Consequences of Jimmy Lai conviction ==
As a Non-Permanent Judge of the Hong Kong Court of Final Appeal, Lord Neuberger is flown into Hong Kong and paid approximately £40,000 for each month-long visit. He sat on the final appeal panel which unanimously dismissed a bid by pro-democracy activist Jimmy Lai and six others to overturn all their various convictions for taking part in a peaceful protest in August 2019. For his participation in the judgment, Lord Neuberger was called "delusional" by Hong Kong's last governor, Lord Patten, and subsequently resigned from the Media Freedom Coalition. In its article about the furore over the conviction and subsequent resignation, The Washington Post noted that the Hong Kong government condemned Lord Patten's “wanton personal vilifications.”

Lord Neuberger in his resignation letter attributed the resignation to "focus on my position as a non-permanent judge in Hong Kong" which might impact or distract from the work of the High Level Panel. Reporters Without Borders (RSF) in its post about it described the resignation as “necessary to protect the independence and integrity of the High Level Panel.”

As at August 2026, Lord Neuberger’s continued sitting as a judge in Hong Kong remained highly controversial.

== Honorary appointments ==
=== 2024 ===
Lord Neuberger as at 17 August 2024 was President of The Academy of Experts and of the British Institute of International & Comparative Law (BIICL). He was chair of the Board of the Institute of Family Law Arbitrators, and a Member of the Tate Ethics Committee and of the Francis Crick Institute Ethics Committee. He was also Member of the advisory board of Grit. He was trustee of the Centre for German-Jewish Studies at the University of Sussex, and of Mental Health Research UK. He was trustee and director of associated companies for Prisoners Abroad, for the Thrombosis Research Institute and for The Westminster School Foundation (UK) Limited.

=== Historical ===
Neuberger was Chairman of the Schizophrenia Trust from 2003 to 2013, when it merged with and was subsumed by Mental Health Research UK. He was a Governor of the University of the Arts London between 2000 and 2010. He was President of the British Records Association from 2009 to 2012, in his capacity as Master of the Rolls. On 18 May 2020 he was appointed as Deputy President of The Academy of Experts and replaced Mark Saville, Baron Saville of Newdigate as President in late 2020.

== Awards and honours ==
He was elected an Honorary Fellow of the Royal Society in 2017.

In 2018, Lord Neuberger was awarded the Gold Bauhinia Star by the Chief Executive of Hong Kong.

== Cases ==
=== Notable cases or comments ===
In May 2010, Lord Neuberger gave an ex tempore dissenting judgment that the trade union Unite had not complied with ballot rules under trade union legislation.

In July 2010 Lord Neuberger ruled that peace protesters in Parliament Square who had camped out in Democracy Village should be evicted after the protesters lost an appeal.

In May 2011, while commenting on super injunctions, he said that social media sites like Twitter were "totally out of control" and society should consider ways to bring such websites under control.

=== Other selected cases ===
- Akici v L R Butlin Ltd [2006] WLR 601
- In re Osiris Insurance Ltd [1991] 1 BCLC 182
- Re Park House Properties [1997] 2 BCLC 530
- Yuen v McDonald's Corp (Chancery Division, 27 November 2001) The Daily Telegraph, 6 December 2001
- Re T&D Industries plc [2000] BCC 956
- Krasner v McMath [2005]
- St Helen's MBC v Derbyshire [2007] UKHL 16, [2007] ICR 841
- Stack v Dowden [2007] 2 AC 432, Lord Neuberger gave a powerful dissenting speech in which he warned the majority of violating "principle", departing from established precedence and complicating judicial tasks.
- Ladele v London Borough of Islington [2009]
- British Airways plc v Unite the Union [2010] EWCA Civ
- Manchester City Council v Pinnock [2010] UKSC 45, Lord Neuberger MR sitting in the Supreme Court along with 8 other Justices giving the only judgment,
- The Public Prosecution Service v William Elliott and Robert McKee [2013] UKSC 32
- FHR European Ventures LLP v Cedar Capital Partners LLC [2014] UKSC 45
- Jetivia SA v Bilta (UK) Limited (in liquidation) [2015] UKSC 23
- Marks and Spencer plc v BNP Paribas Securities Services Trust Company (Jersey) Ltd [2015] UKSC 72

== Significant lectures ==
On 24 February 2014, Lord Neuberger delivered at Cambridge University the Freshfields annual lecture, which he entitled "The British and Europe".

== Personal life ==
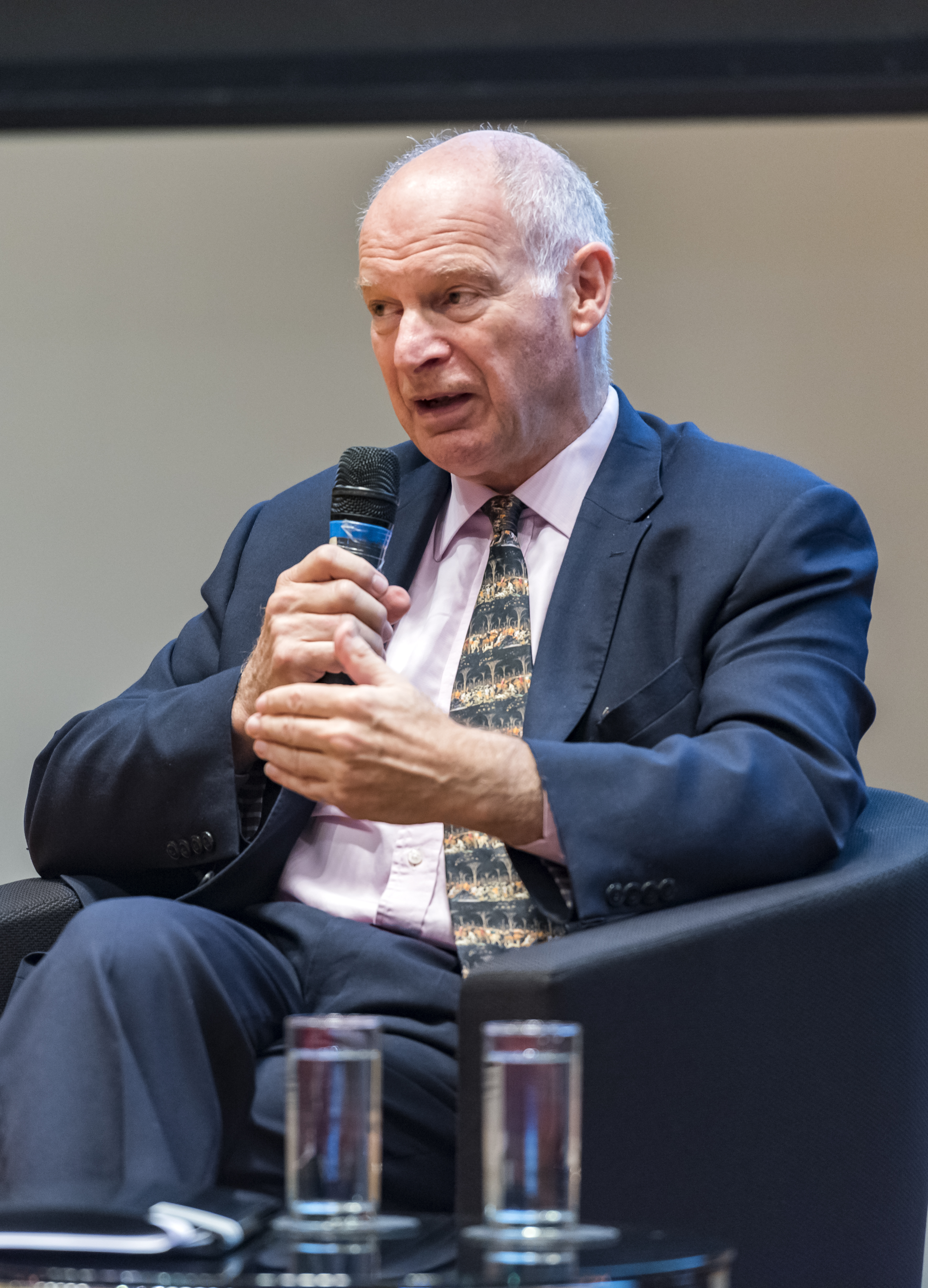
Lord Neuberger of Abbotsbury speaking at a conference in Singapore in 2016

In 1976, Neuberger married Angela Holdsworth, the TV producer and writer. They have three children, Jessica, Nicholas and Max, who are all solicitors. Neuberger's sister-in-law, through his brother Anthony Neuberger, is Julia Neuberger, Baroness Neuberger, Senior Rabbi of the West London Synagogue.

Legal offices
Preceded by The Lord Phillips of Worth Matravers	President of the Supreme Court of the United Kingdom; 2012–2017	Succeeded by The Baroness Hale of Richmond
Preceded by The Lord Clarke of Stone-cum-Ebony	Master of the Rolls; 2009–2012	Succeeded by Lord Dyson
Preceded by None	Non-Permanent Judge of the Court of Final Appeal of Hong Kong; 2009–present	Incumbent
Order of precedence
Preceded by Lord Hoffman; Non-Permanent Judge of the Court of Final Appeal	Hong Kong order of precedence Non-Permanent Judge of the Court of Final Appeal	Succeeded by William Gummow; Non-Permanent Judge of the Court of Final Appeal
