= John Matthew Mitchell =

British academic (1925–2019)

John Matthew Mitchell CBE (22 March 1925 – 9 April 2019) was Assistant Director-General (1981–1984) and Senior Research Fellow (1984–1985) of the British Council.

Education: Ilford County High School, Worcester College, Oxford, Queens' College, Cambridge (MA), Vienna (PhD 1949).

Mitchell served in the Royal Navy in World War II, 1944–1946. He worked for the British Council from 1949 until his retirement in 1985, by which time he was Assistant Director-General. Mitchell died in Surrey on 9 April 2019, at the age of 94.

== Appointments and honours ==
- Visiting Fellow, Wolfson College, Cambridge, 1972-3.
- He was awarded the CBE in 1976.
- Fellow, Institute of Linguists (Chairman of Council, 1996–99; President, 2004).

== Publications ==
- International Cultural Relations, 1986
- Verse and short stories, including Selected Poems, 2009
- Translations from German and French

In his self-published book of poems, the author acknowledges that the selection includes items previously published in the New Statesman, The Listener, The London Magazine, Country Life, and elsewhere, often under the name Matthew Mitchell.
