= Ralph Stead =

British businessman

Ralph Edmund Stead (7 January 1917 – 27 September 2000) was Chairman of the Eastern Region of the British Gas Corporation, 1977–81.

Education: Manchester Grammar School and Ilford County High School.

During World War II, he served in the Royal Army Service Corps. Qualifying as a chartered accountant in 1949, he worked for British Gas for the rest of his career.

He was also a member of the Financial Institutions Group, Department of the Environment, 1981–82; Management Committee, Lazards Property Unit Trust, 1979–92; and the Rent Assessment Panel for Scotland, 1983–87.
