= William Thomas George Gates =

British banker

William Thomas George Gates CBE (21 January 1908 – 23 November 1990), was a banker and expert on Africa.

== Biography ==
Gates was educated at Ilford County High School and the University of London before working at the National Bank of New Zealand at their London office, 1925–1930. He then moved to John Holt & Co. (Liverpool) Ltd, where he worked until his retirement in 1967. He was resident in Nigeria, 1930–1946 and their General Manager there from 1940. He became their Managing Director in 1956 and their Deputy Chairman in 1964. He was also a director of the West African Airways Corporation, 1941–46.

== Other posts held ==
- District Scout Commissioner, Northern Nigeria, 1940–42.
- Member, Liverpool District Committee, Royal National Lifeboat Institution, 1956–73
- Member, Board of Governors, United Liverpool Hospitals, 1958–70.
- Chairman, West Africa Committee (now the Business Council for Africa), 1961–76.
- General Commissioner of Income Tax, 1967–73.
- Chairman, Royal African Society, 1975–77; Vice-President, 1978–87).

He was appointed a CBE in 1967.

Keen on cricket and golf, he was a member of the MCC and the Royal Liverpool Golf Club, Hoylake. He was also an enthusiastic angler and gardener.
