= Neil Merritt =

Neil Merritt (born 3 March 1939) was the last President of Portsmouth Polytechnic (1991-2) and the first Vice-Chancellor of the University of Portsmouth (1992-4). He was chairman of Hillingdon Hospital Trust, 1991–94.

== Career ==
He was educated at Ilford County High School and the University of Hull (LLB). He lectured in law at various colleges, 1962–1973. (He was Secretary, then Chairman of the Association of Law Teachers, 1965–71.) He then became Vice-Principal of Mid-Essex Technical College, 1973–74. He was visiting professor of law at Indiana University in 1974. He was Pro-Director of Chelmer Institute of Higher Education, 1975–76, then returned to Indiana.

He was Director of Ealing Technical College (which became Ealing College of Higher Education, then the Polytechnic of West London), 1977–91. Throughout this time, he was a member of the Standing Conference of Principals.

Merritt resigned as vice-chancellor of the University of Portsmouth in 1994. His resignation followed his acceptance that he had made errors of judgement relating to his expenses; he had been claiming expenses for executive class flight tickets for long haul air travel but then trading the tickets in for cheaper deals and making a personal profit. Merritt received a £52,500 severance package and was never prosecuted. In 2014, Hampshire Constabulary reviewed the material relating to the expenses; the force's chief constable, Andy Marsh, subsequently wrote a letter in which he stated that it was “evident from this material that offences of fraud were committed” and that other allegations should also have been further investigated.

== Positions held ==
Throughout his career, Merritt served on committees connected with higher education. These included:

- Member: Advisory Committee on Legal Education, 1972–76
- Member: Council for National Academic Awards Legal Studies Board, 1978–84
- Member: National Advisory Body for Public Sector Higher Education Board, 1982-88 (Member, Chairman's Study Group, 1983–88)
- Trustee, then Vice-Chairman, Central Bureau for Educational Visits and Exchanges, 1980–88
- Chairman: Committee for Business and Finance, Business and Technology Education Council, 1982–85
- Chairman: Polytechnic and Colls Employers Forum, 1990–92
- President, European Association of Higher Education, 1990–92
- Co-Chairman, Committee for Higher Education in the European Community, 1991–92

He is a Fellow of the Royal Society of Arts.

== Publications ==
His book Business Law (with E. G. H. Clayton), published 1966, became a standard textbook.
