= Charles Harington (chemist) =

Welsh chemist

Charles Robert Harington
- Born: 1 August 1897; Llanerfyl, Wales
- Died: 4 February 1972 (aged 74); Mill Hill, London, England
- Known for: Synthesising thyroxine
- Scientific career
- Fields: Chemistry

Sir Charles Robert Harington, KBE, FRS (1 August 1897 – 4 February 1972) was a chemist, best known for synthesising thyroxine.

== Life ==
Although he was born and raised in Llanerfyl, north Wales. he was a member of the English aristocracy from the Harington family which can be traced back to 12th century Rutland. He was the son of Rev Charles Harington of Llanerfyl and his wife Audrey Emma Bayly. He was educated at Malvern College and then Cambridge University, graduating MA in 1919.

From 1920 to 1922 he was a research assistant in the therapeutics section of Edinburgh Royal Infirmary. He gained a PhD in 'Aspect of the pathology of protein metabolism' from the University of Edinburgh in 1922. He then went to University College, London as a lecturer in Chemical Pathology.

He was professor of chemical pathology at University College London between 1931 and 1942, and then director of the National Institute for Medical Research between 1942 and 1962. He was elected a Fellow of the Royal Society in 1931. One of his PhD pupils at UCL was Albert Neuberger, later Professor of Chemical Pathology at St Mary's Hospital, London, then part of the University of London.

He was knighted in 1948 and appointed Knight Commander of the Order of the British Empire (KBE) in 1962.

He died at home in Mill Hill in north-west London on 4 February 1972.

== Family ==
In 1923 he married Jessie McCririe Craig. They had a son and two daughters.

== Publications ==
- The Thyroid Gland: Its Chemistry and Physiology (1933)
