= Raymond Peters =

British chemist (1918–1995)

Raymond Harry Peters (19 February 1918 – 15 July 1995) was Professor of Polymer and Fibre Science, University of Manchester, 1955–1984, then professor emeritus.

He was educated at Ilford County High School, King's College London and the University of Manchester.

He worked for Imperial Chemical Industries, 1941-1946 and 1949–1955. After retirement, he was visiting professor at UMIST, 1984-1986 and the University of Strathclyde, 1984. He was president of the Society of Dyers and Colourists, 1967–1968.
