= Arthur Button (RAF officer) =

Royal Air Force air marshal

- Born: 26 May 1916
- Died: 27 May 1991 (aged 75)
- Military career
- Allegiance: United Kingdom
- Branch: Royal Air Force
- Service years: 1938–1976
- Rank: Air Vice Marshal
- Conflicts: Second World War
- Awards: Companion of the Order of the Bath; Officer of the Order of the British Empire; Queen's Commendation for Valuable Service in the Air

Air Vice Marshal Arthur Daniel Button CB, OBE (26 May 1916 – 27 May 1991) was a Royal Air Force officer.

He was educated at Ilford County High School and University College, Southampton (later the University of Southampton; BSc Hons (Lond.)).

He joined the RAF Educational Service in 1938. He married Eira Waterhouse in 1944. He was on general duties, 1941–6; his pilot experience during this time was mainly for instructional purposes. In 1946 he received the Queen's Commendation for Valuable Service in the Air, and returned to the RAF Education Branch. He was a senior maths instructor until 1949, followed by other varied duties such as armament staff officer at HQ RAF Bomber Command. He rose to become Director of the RAF Educational Services 1972–6.

After his retirement, he was director of the Association of Recognised English Language Schools (ARELS) Examinations Trust, 1976–86. He was a member of the council of the RAF Benevolent Fund and the RAF Association, 1980-9 and the Lord Kitchener National Memorial Fund, 1983–1991. He was Honorary President, ARELS-FELCO (Federation of English Language Course Organisations), from 1990 and a governor of the Duke of Kent School, 1981–6.

He was appointed an Officer of the Order of the British Empire in 1959 and a Companion of the Order of the Bath in 1976.
