= Steven Haberman =

Steven Haberman is Director and Deputy Dean in Cass Business School, Professor of Actuarial Science in its Faculty of Actuarial Science and Insurance and is Founding Editor of the Journal of Pension, Economics and Finance.

He was educated at Ilford County High School, Trinity College, Cambridge (MA) and City University (PhD, DSc).

== Career ==
- Prudential Assurance Company, 1972–74
- Government Actuary's Department, 1977–97
- City University: lecturer, Department of Actuarial Science 1974–79, senior lecturer 1979–83, reader 1983–85, professor 1985–, dean School of Mathematics 1995–2002
- Deputy dean, Cass Business School 2002–

== See also ==
- List of British Jewish scientists
