= Albert Neuberger =

British biochemist (1908–1996)

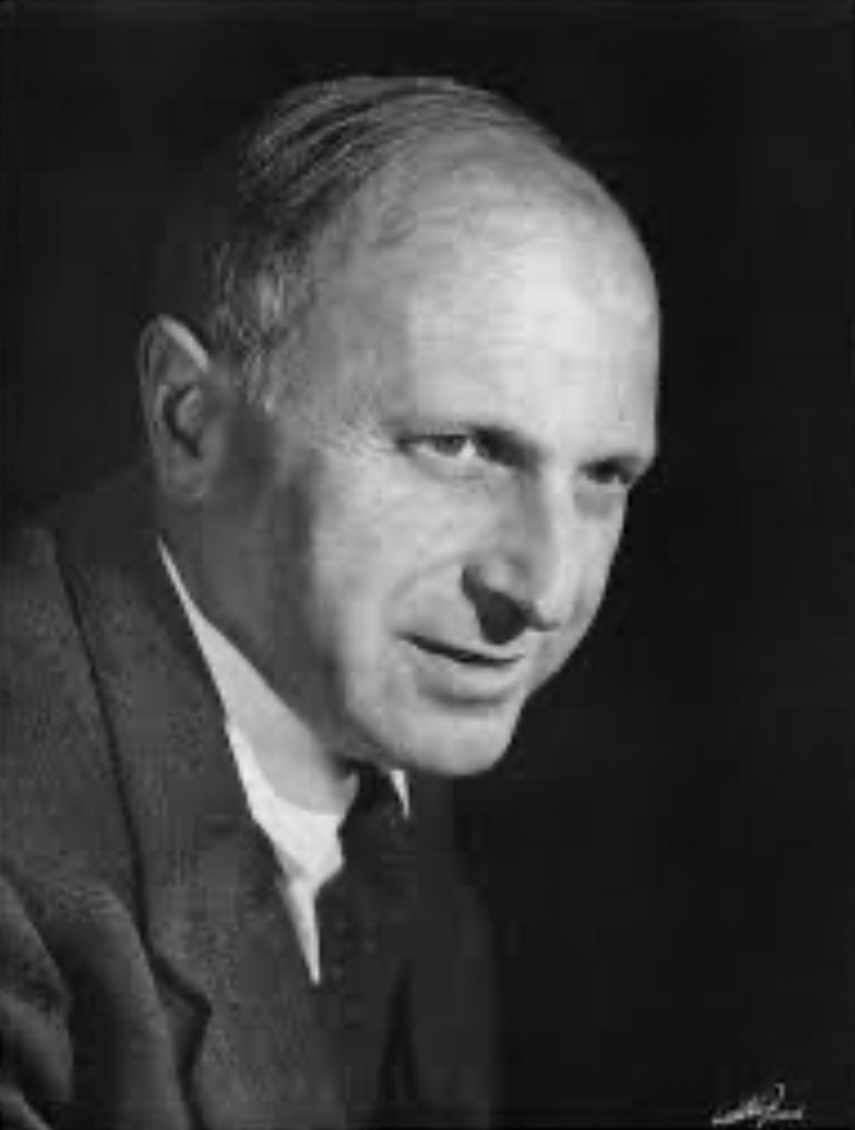
- Born: 15 April 1908; Hassfurt, Bavaria, German Empire
- Died: 14 August 1996 (aged 88); Hampstead, London, England
- Education: University of Würzburg; University College London
- Spouse: Lilian Ida Dreyfus (m. 1943)
- Children: David Neuberger; James Neuberger; Anthony Neuberger; Michael Neuberger; Janet Neuberger
- Awards: Fellow of the Royal Society
- Scientific career
- Workplaces: University of Cambridge
- Doctoral advisor: Charles Robert Harington
- Doctoral students: Frederick Sanger

Albert Neuberger CBE FRCP (15 April 1908 – 14 August 1996) was a British Professor of Chemical Pathology, St Mary's Hospital, 1955–1973, and later emeritus professor.

== Education in Germany ==
Born in Hassfurt, northern Bavaria, the first of the three children of Max (Meir) Neuberger (1877–1931), cloth merchant and businessman, and Bertha, née Hiller (1888–1974), both religious Jews. He studied medicine at the University of Würzburg where he was awarded a summa cum laude medical degree. He also took courses in chemistry there and also attended lectures given by Karl Bonhöffer, the outstanding psychiatrist and neurologist. He also worked for a while in research in Berlin where he began a lifelong friendship with Ernst Chain. Chain shared the 1945 Nobel prize with Alexander Fleming and Howard Florey for their work on penicillin.

== Education and career in England ==
Neuberger foresaw Hitler's persecution of the Jews after he came to power in 1933, and, as with numerous other Jewish intellectuals (including Chain), he fled to London. He received a PhD from the University College London (UCL) after attending UCL Medical School under Professor Sir Charles Robert Harington FRS in 1936 and continued research there. At the start of the Second World War he moved to the Department of Biochemistry at the University of Cambridge where he took on Fred Sanger as his PhD student. They published a paper together on the nitrogen content of potatoes. In 1942 he moved back to London to work at the National Institute for Medical Research. During the war, he spent some time in India as a consultant in nutrition to the army. From 1950 to 1955 he was Head of Biochemistry at the National Institute for Medical Research. He then moved to St Mary's Hospital as Professor.

He was elected a Fellow of the Royal Society in 1951, as was his son, Michael Neuberger, in 1993—a rare case of both father and son being FRS. He was appointed a CBE in 1964. He was also a Fellow of the Royal College of Physicians and the Royal Society of Chemistry. Other awards include the Heberden medal of the Royal Society of Medicine (1959), the Frederick Gowland Hopkins medal of the Biochemical Society (1960) and of which he was elected an honorary member (1973). He was also a foreign honorary member of the American Academy of Arts and Sciences (1972). He received honorary doctorates from the University of Aberdeen (1967), the Hebrew University of Jerusalem (1968), and the University of Hull (1981).

He married Lilian Ida Dreyfus in 1943 and was the father of (1) James Neuberger, (2) David Neuberger, Baron Neuberger of Abbotsbury, (3) Anthony Neuberger, Professor of Finance, University of Warwick, (4) Michael Neuberger and (5) Janet Neuberger. He was also the brother of Rabbi Herman Neuberger.

== See also ==
- The Lister Institute of Preventive Medicine
