= Kenneth Lefever =

Kenneth Ernest Lefever, CB (22 February 1915 – 8 July 2006) was a senior British civil servant born in Ilford and educated at Ilford County High School.

He spent his entire career, from 1935 to 1975, at HM Customs and Excise, apart from service in World War II from 1942 to 1946 as a captain in the Royal Engineers. He became a commissioner of Customs and Excise from 1972 to 1975, and Director of Organisation and Chief Inspector in 1974, making him the second most senior person in the organisation. He was made a Companion of the Order of the Bath in 1974.

After his retirement, he was appointed to the Civil Service Appeal Board, and was its Deputy Chairman from 1978 to 1980.
