= Peter Thomas Bauer =

Economist (1915–2002)

The Right Honourable The Lord Bauer FBA
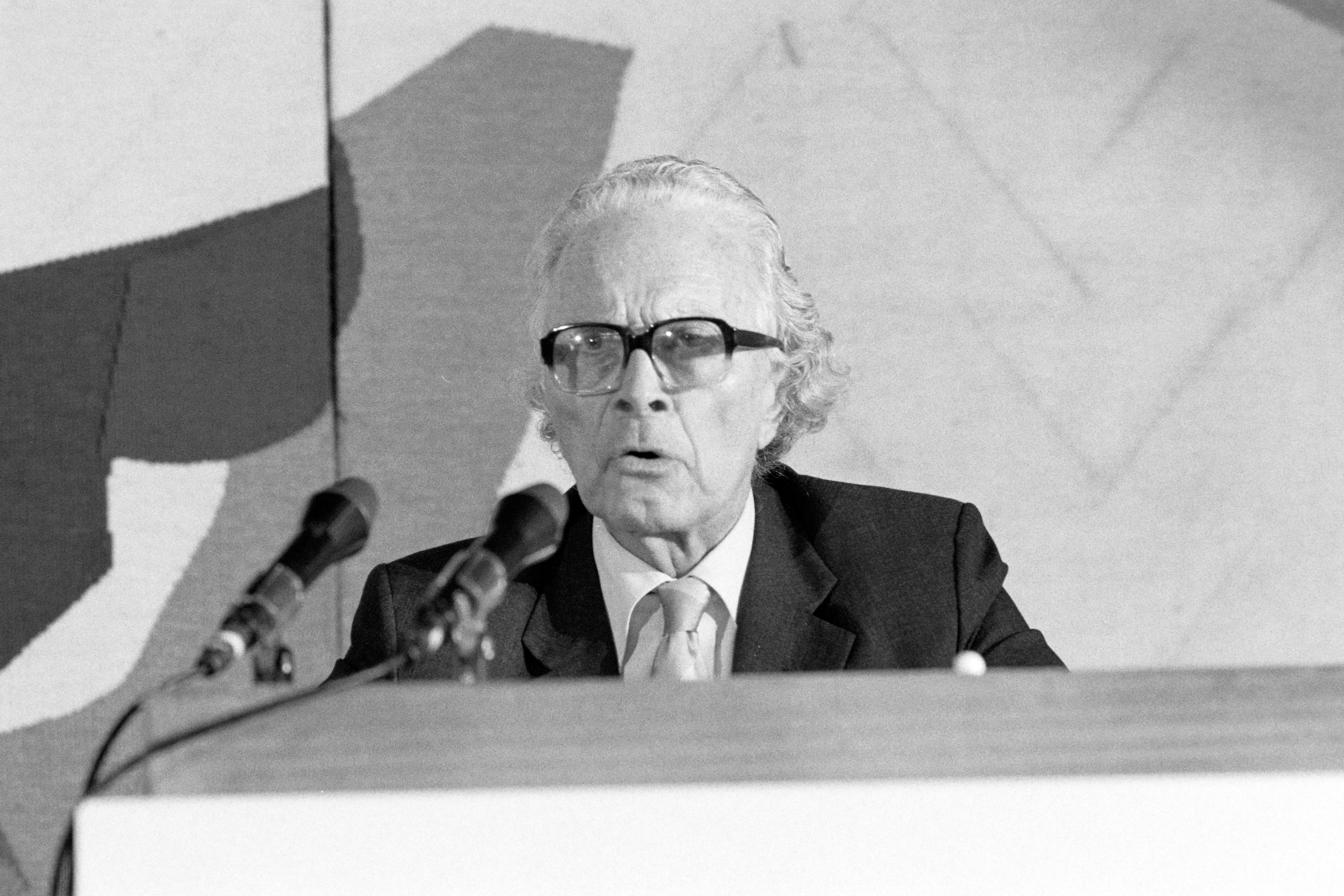
- Bauer in 1986
- Born: 6 November 1915; Budapest, Austria-Hungary
- Died: 2 May 2002 (aged 86)
- Known for: Pioneering work in development economics
- Awards: Friedman Prize for Advancing Liberty

Academic background
- Education: Gonville and Caius College, Cambridge
- Influences: Friedrich Hayek

Academic work
- Institutions: London School of Economics

Member of the House of Lords
- Lord Temporal
- Life peerage 10 February 1983 – 3 May 2002

Peter Thomas Bauer, Baron Bauer, FBA (6 November 1915 – 2 May 2002) was a Hungarian-born British development economist. Bauer is best remembered for his opposition to the then widely-held notion that the most effective manner to help developing countries advance is through state led development planning supported by foreign aid.

== Life ==
Portrait by Nick Sinclair, 1992

Bauer was born Péter Tamás Bauer in Budapest, Austria-Hungary, in 1915. His family was Jewish. He studied law in Budapest before embarking for England in 1934 to study economics at Gonville and Caius College, Cambridge, from which he graduated in 1937. After a brief period in the private sector working for Guthrie & Co., a London-based merchant house that conducted business in the Far East, Bauer spent most of his career at the London School of Economics. Bauer started teaching there in 1960 and retired in 1983 as Emeritus Professor of Economics.

With the support of his friend and admirer Prime Minister Margaret Thatcher, he was created a life peer as Baron Bauer, of Market Ward in the City of Cambridge on 15 February 1983. Lord Bauer was also a fellow of the British Academy and a member of the Mont Pelerin Society, which was founded by his friend Friedrich Hayek.

In 1978, Bauer received an Honorary Doctoral Degree at Universidad Francisco Marroquin for his contributions to economics.

In 2002, he won the Friedman Prize for Advancing Liberty; as part of his award, The Cato Institute cited his courage in espousing an approach almost universally opposed in post-World War II international economic circles. Bauer told London's Daily Telegraph: "I am truly honoured. I have long admired The Cato Institute and Milton Friedman, and recognition by both could not be more delightful."

He died on May 2, 2002.

== Contributions to economics ==
Nearly all of Bauer's contributions concerned development economics, international development and foreign aid. Bauer sought to convince other development experts that central planning, foreign aid, price controls, and protectionism perpetuate poverty rather than eliminate it, and that the growth of government intervention politicises economic life and reduces individual freedom.

Bauer influenced thinking about the determinants of economic advance. For example, the World Bank, in its 1997 World Development Report, reflected the point of view Bauer had been advocating for years, stating that the notion that "good advisers and technical experts would formulate good policies, which good governments would then implement for the good of society" was outdated:

the institutional assumptions implicit in this world view were, as we all realize today, too simplistic... . Governments embarked on fanciful schemes. Private investors, lacking confidence in public policies or in the steadfastness of leaders, held back. Powerful rulers acted arbitrarily. Corruption became endemic. Development faltered, and poverty endured.

For Bauer, the essence of development was the expansion of individual choices, and the role of the state to protect life, liberty and property so that individuals can pursue their own goals and desires. Limited government, not central planning, was his mantra.

He argued that "The exponents of Western guilt... patronize the Third World by suggesting that its economic fortunes past, present, and prospective, are determined by the West; that past exploitation by the West explains Third World backwardness... and that (their) economic future depends largely on Western donations."

Bauer placed himself in the tradition of libertarians. In his many articles and books, including Dissent on Development, Bauer overturned many of the commonly held beliefs of development economics. He refuted the idea that poverty is self-perpetuating and showed that central planning and large-scale public investment are not preconditions for growth.

He criticised the idea that the disadvantaged could not and would not save for the future, or that they had no motivation to improve their condition. He opposed "compulsory saving," which he preferred to call "special taxation," and, like modern supply-side economists, stressed the detrimental effects of high taxes on economic activity. Bauer also saw that government-directed investment funded by "special taxation" would increase "inequality in the distribution of power."

Bauer's experiences in Malaya (now West Malaysia) in the late 1940s and in West Africa influenced his views on the importance of individual effort by small landowners and traders in moving from subsistence to a higher standard of living. Bauer recognised the importance of the informal sector and advocated the "dynamic gains" from international trade – that is, the net gains that result from exposure to new ideas, new methods of production, new products, and new people. He demonstrated that trade barriers, and restrictive immigration and population policies deprive countries of those gains.

For Bauer, government-to-government aid was neither necessary nor sufficient for development, and may actually hinder it. The danger of aid, according to Bauer, is that it increases the power of government, leads to corruption, misallocates resources, and erodes civil society.

Bauer also debunked what Ralph Raico has termed the "timeless approach" to history. A person commits this fallacy when he ignores the various events and preconditions which existed before and acted as prerequisites for the event or state of affairs being analysed. Quoting Raico: "Rejecting the 'timeless approach' to economic development, Bauer has accentuated the many centuries required for economic growth in the Western world, and the interplay of various cultural factors that were its precondition"

== Major works ==
- Bauer, P. T. (1946). "The Working of Rubber Regulation". The Economic Journal. 56 (223). The Economic Journal, Vol. 56, No. 223: 391–414. doi:10.2307/2226047. JSTOR 2226047.
- Bauer, P. T.; Yamey, B. S. (1951). "Economic Progress and Occupational Distribution". The Economic Journal. 61 (244). The Economic Journal, Vol. 61, No. 244: 741–755. doi:10.2307/2226978. JSTOR 2226978. (with Basil S. Yamey)
- The Rubber Industry: A Study in Competition and Monopoly. Longmans, Green & Co. 1948.
- "Reduction in the Fluctuations of Incomes of Primary Producers". The Economic Journal. 62 (248). The Economic Journal, Vol. 62, No. 248: 750–780. 1952. doi:10.2307/2226525. JSTOR 2226525. (with F. W. Paish)
- West African Trade: A Study of Competition, Oligopoly and Monopoly in a Changing Economy. Cambridge University Press. 1954.
- The Economics of Under-developed Countries. Cambridge University Press. 1957. (with Basil S. Yamey)
- Economic Analysis and Policy in Under-developed Countries. Cambridge University Press. 1957. ISBN 0-415-31297-3.
- United States Aid and Indian Economic Development. American Enterprise Association. 1959. ISBN 0-297-78335-1.
- Indian Economic Policy and Development. Allen & Unwin. 1961.
- Bauer, P. T. (1971). "Economic History as Theory". Economica. 38 (150): 163–179. doi:10.2307/2552576. JSTOR 2552576.
- Dissent on Development. Harvard University Press. 1972. ISBN 0-674-21282-7.
- Equality, the Third World, and Economic Delusion. Harvard University Press. 1981. ISBN 0-674-25986-6.
- Reality and Rhetoric; Studies in the Economics of Development. Harvard University Press. 1984. ISBN 0-674-74946-4.
- The Development Frontier: Essays in Applied Economics. Harvester Wheatsheaf. 1991. ISBN 0-7450-1038-5.
- From Subsistence to Exchange. Princeton University Press. 2000. ISBN 0-691-11782-9. (with Amartya Sen)

== Arms ==
Coat of arms of Peter Thomas Bauer
Crest Between two feathers Argent quilled Or an escallop perched thereon a nightingale also Or. Escutcheon Gules a serpent erect between two escallops Or on a chief also Or a lion passant guardant Gules between two open books Argent bound Gules. Supporters Dexter a Malayan rubber tapper wearing a sarong of checked design Argent and Gules holding in the exterior hand a knife Proper, sinister an African market woman habited in a blouse sarong and headscarf of Batik design Or and Gules holding with her exterior hand a basket Proper. Motto Let Us Be Free From Cant

== Bibliography ==
- Blundell, John (2002). A Tribute to Peter Bauer. The Institute of Economic Affairs. ISBN 0-255-36531-4.
- Dorn, James A. (2008). "Bauer, Peter (1915–2002)". In Hamowy, Ronald (ed.). The Encyclopedia of Libertarianism. Thousand Oaks, CA: Sage; Cato Institute. pp. 27–28. doi:10.4135/9781412965811.n17. ISBN 978-1412965804. LCCN 2008009151. OCLC 750831024.
- 1997 World Development Report
- Vasquez, Ian (2007). "Peter Bauer: Blazing the Trail of Development". Econ Journal Watch.
