= Filled pause =

Pause in speech filled with filler word

A filled pause is a non-silent pause in otherwise fluent speech, where instead of a silent pause there is a filler. The filler can be non-lexical or semiarticulate utterances such as huh, uh, erm, um, or hmm. Fillers may also include words such as well, so, I mean, and like, when used in ways that do not change the meaning of the surrounding speech.

This particular type of pause is one of several types of speech disfluencies, which also include silent pauses, "false starts", phrases that are restarted or repeated, and repeated syllables.
