= Ilford County High School =

Selective secondary grammar school for boys

Location
- Fremantle Road; Barkingside, IG6 2JB; England; 51.592°N 0.077°E

Information
- Type: Grammar
- Motto: Learning to Lead. Empowering to Excel
- Established: 1901
- Local authority: Redbridge
- Department for Education URN: 102850 Tables
- Ofsted: Reports
- Head Teacher: Gavin Barnett
- Staff: 88
- Gender: Boys
- Age: 11 to 18
- Enrolment: 1096
- Houses: Eagles; Falcons; Hawks; Kestrels
- Colours: Burgundy and White
- Alumni: Old Parkonians
- Website: http://www.ichs.org.uk/

Ilford County High School (often abbreviated to ICHS) is a selective secondary grammar school for boys located in the town of Barkingside of the London Borough of Redbridge. The school was formerly called Park High Grade School and as a result old boys are referred to as Old Parkonians.

ICHS is a six-form entry school, each form comprising up to 30 pupils. Originally one of a number of selective schools in the London Borough of Redbridge, ICHS was retained in 1973 as the only boys’ selective school in the borough. Admission at 11+ takes place through tests administered by the borough as local education authority. There is also opportunity for admission at 16+, directly into the sixth form, but the majority of places each year are taken up by existing students of the school.

== History ==
The school was founded in 1901 in Balfour Road, Ilford as Park Higher Grade School, before moving to its present site on Fremantle Road, Barkingside in 1935. The ground floor of the original building in Balfour Road is today used as an annexe for the adjoining Christchurch Primary School, and the remainder of the building as Redbridge Teachers' Centre.

Although there once existed several selective grammar schools in the area, by 1973 it remained the only boys' selective school in Redbridge. The girls' section split off in 1929 to a new site in Cranbrook Road, where the school was known as Ilford County High School for Girls. Following the conversion of the girls' school to being part of a co-educational school (Valentines High School), Woodford County High School (WCHS) is now seen as the "sister school". In recent times, it has become the "partner school" of Trinity Catholic High School and Ilford Jewish Primary School.

In 2004/5, there were 843 pupils, including 245 in the sixth form, and 88 members of staff, including 63 teachers.

In 2021, the school's Ofsted rating was downgraded from 'outstanding' to 'good'.

In 2025-26, the school received a new Ofsted rating of 'strong standard' in all categories, following the new Ofsted rating system.

=== Headteachers ===
- 1901-1906: C W Clayson
- 1906-1936: Alfred E Diggins
- 1936-1966: Harry S Kenward
- 1966-1979: F Clifford Young
- 1979-1986: John A Evans
- 1986-1993: David J Moore
- 1993-2009: Stuart I Devereux
- 2010-2014: Michael Capon
- 2015-2025: Rebecca Drysdale
- 2025–present: Gavin Barnett

=== Old Parkonians ===
The Old Parkonians Association was founded as an association of former pupils of the Ilford County High School. Today, the association performs a dual role, as "landlord" of the facilities at the Oakfield Playing Fields and parent body for the affiliated Sports Clubs, and as a social hub for former pupils of the School.

The association has two affiliated sports clubs; the Old Parkonians Football Club & the Oakfield Parkonians Cricket Club.

Old Parkonians FC currently has four senior teams, two teams in the Essex Alliance League, and two more (as of season 2025-26) maintaining the long history of the Club by competing in the Southern Amateur League.

In the 2011/12 season, when the Club fielded as many as 9 teams in the SAL, OPFC became the first club to simultaneously hold the Senior (1st XI), Junior (2nd XI) and Minor (3rd XI) Old Boys cups.

In Summer 2014 the football club created a youth section called the Young Parkonians Football Club. There are currently Under 13's and Under 16's teams competing in the Echo Junior Football League with plans to add more youth teams in future years.

The Cricket Club, now open to all under the Oakfield Parkonians name, still retains strong links with the School, providing coaching during the winter and playing the annual Centenary Trophy match against the School 1st XI each year. The Cricket Club will field 6 XIs in the Hamro Foundation Essex Cricket League, and teams playing friendlies on Sundays, as well as running an extensive Colts section.

== School magazine ==
=== Chronicles ===
The school has published a magazine since its foundation entitled "Chronicles", often showcasing students' poems and artwork, in addition to news. Prior to 2007, Chronicles had always been published in book format and distributed to students throughout the school. However, this was discontinued in 2007, and was replaced by an online-only version. In 2025. however, there was a Chronicle remaster, in which there are two versions: winter and summer. These brought back paper copies, available at the reception office.

=== Focus ===
"Focus" was a school newspaper written by a group of school pupils. The first edition was released in 2010.

=== STEM ===
"STEM" was a termly periodical, formed and edited by a team of sixth form students which published articles on science-orientated subjects. The periodical was distributed during the 2015 academic year and remains available to view on the school website

== New facilities ==
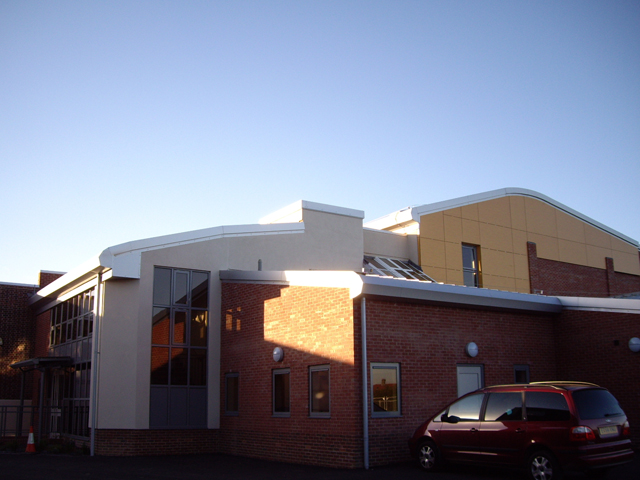
Side view of the new Sports Hall

Construction of a new Sports Hall was completed in November 2006 and was opened by former pupil Sir Trevor Brooking. The Sports Hall provides access to gym equipment, a swimming pool and a large sports hall. However the swimming pool later closed due to cost issues. It now remains as a relic commonly used for changing in Physical Education.

The Learning Resource Centre (Library) also came into action in October.

In 2014, the Sixth Form Suite was constructed, purpose made for KS5 students to use as a learning environment outside of the LRC which is used by all years. The block is constructed in the location of the old Economics and Business class, which has since been housed elsewhere in the school. The Sixth Form Suite also houses the offices for the Head of Sixth Form & Deputy Heads of Sixth Form.

On 1 June 2015 work was started to refurbish the canteen, and the canteen was ready for use for the students by the start of new school year. In August 2015 on the construction of a new science and technology block, with additional sixth form facilities, preparatory to expansion of the main school to six forms of entry commencing with the Year 7 intake in September 2016. Work initially got delayed due to planning permission going through with the sister school, Woodford County High School. In September 2015, construction commenced for the expansion of the school, while the school maintained normal functionality. The new building was finally available to students September 2017, and has been in use ever since.

== Notable alumni ==
- Sir Husein Hasanally Abdoolcader (1890–1974), Indian-born Malayan politician
- Kenneth Allen (1923–1997), professor of nuclear physics, University of Oxford
- Laurence Baxter (1954–1996), professor of statistics, State University of New York
- Raymond Baxter (1922–2006), TV personality (Tomorrow's World)
- Sir Michael Berry (b. 1941), professor of physics at Bristol University
- Reginald Horace Blyth (1898–1964), author and devotee of Japanese culture
- Sir Trevor Brooking (b. 1948), footballer
- Gerald Butler (1930-2010), Judge
- Air Vice-Marshal Arthur Button (1916–1991), director of RAF Education
- Marie Coates (1916 – 2004), biologist and food nutrition scientist
- Varun Chopra (b. 1987), Essex County Cricket Club, formerly Warwickshire County Cricket Club; England Lions (2013) and former captain of the English U-19 cricket team.
- Roland Dobbs (1924-2016), professor of physics, University of London
- William Thomas George Gates (1908–1990), banker
- Tom Goldsmith (b.1974), clerk of the House of Commons since 2023
- Jeffrey Alan Gray (1934–2004), psychologist and linguist
- Brian Green (b. 1956), barrister
- Steven Haberman (b. 1951), professor of actuarial science at City University
- Ronald Hutton (b. 1954), professor of history at the University of Bristol
- David Ian (b. 1961), theatre producer
- Norman Lloyd Johnson (1917–2004), professor of statistics
- Kenneth Lefever, CB (1915–2006), civil servant
- Kathleen Lonsdale (1903–1971), chemist, who had studied at the girls' school and transferred to the boys' school at the age of 16 so she could study science.
- John Lyall (1940–2006), footballer and West Ham manager
- Raymond Lygo (1924-2012), chief of Naval Staff 1978
- Johann Malawana (b. 1979), Doctor and Trade Unionist
- John Moloney (b. 1965), comedian and writer
- Neil Merritt (b. 1939), law lecturer; vice-chancellor, University of Portsmouth
- John Matthew Mitchell (b. 1925), assistant director general, British Council
- Kele Okereke (b. 1981), singer, Bloc Party
- Raymond Peters (1918–1995), professor of polymer and fibre science, University of Manchester
- John Reddaway (1916–1990), deputy head of the United Nations Relief and Works Agency
- Allen Sheppard (1932-2015), Baron Sheppard of Didgemere, industrialist
- Derek Smith (1931-2016), jazz pianist
- Charles Stapley (1925-2011), actor
- Ralph Stead (1917–2000), chairman, Eastern Region, British Gas plc
- Gary Stevenson (b. 1986), economist, equality activist and YouTuber
- Bramwell Tovey (1953-2022), conductor
- Geoffrey Tyler (1920-2012), educationalist

== Notable teachers ==
ICHS teachers notable in other fields, or who became head of a school, include:

- David Evennett, MP 1983–1997 and 2005–2024, had his entire teaching career at ICHS, 1972-4
- Ashley Gunstock, A political candidate for the Green Party
- Rolando Reid, A two-time Olympian with Jamaica's four-man bobsled team competing for the 2022 and 2026 Winter Olympics.
