= John Reddaway =

British diplomat

John Reddaway CMG, OBE (12 April 1916 – 25 June 1990) was a diplomat who served as Deputy Commissioner-General of the United Nations Relief and Works Agency for Palestine Refugees in the Near East (UNRWA), 1960–68.

He was born in Ilford and educated at Ilford County High School and the University of Reading.

Career: Colonial Administrative Service, Cyprus, 1938; Imperial Defence College, 1954; Administrative Secretary, Cyprus, 1957–60; Deputy Commissioner-General, United Nations Relief and Works Agency, 1960–8; Director-General, Arab-British Centre, London, 1970–80.

He was awarded the OBE in 1957 and the CMG in 1959.

As Director of the Arab-British Centre, he was involved in Paris with (in French) Lucien Bitterlin's EURABIA Committee ("European Coordinating Committee of Friendship Societies with the Arab World") where he represented the Council for the Advancement of Arab-British Understanding. He co-signed some publications of this EURABIA Committee.

In 1970 he joined Christopher Mayhew, Claud Morris and Anthony Nutting as a director of Middle East International, a bi-weekly journal focused on the Arab world. It was originally funded by Sheikh Zayed, the newly installed leader of the United Arab Emirates.
