= Otto Liebermann =

Otto Liebermann (24 November 1898 – 6 April 1974) was the first scientist to describe the low-temperature synthesis of dolomite in a reproducible laboratory experiment.

== Works ==
- Liebermann, O. (1967): Synthesis of dolomite. Nature, vol.213, pp. 241–245.
