= Basil Yamey =

South African economist (1919–2020)

Basil Selig Yamey CBE FBA
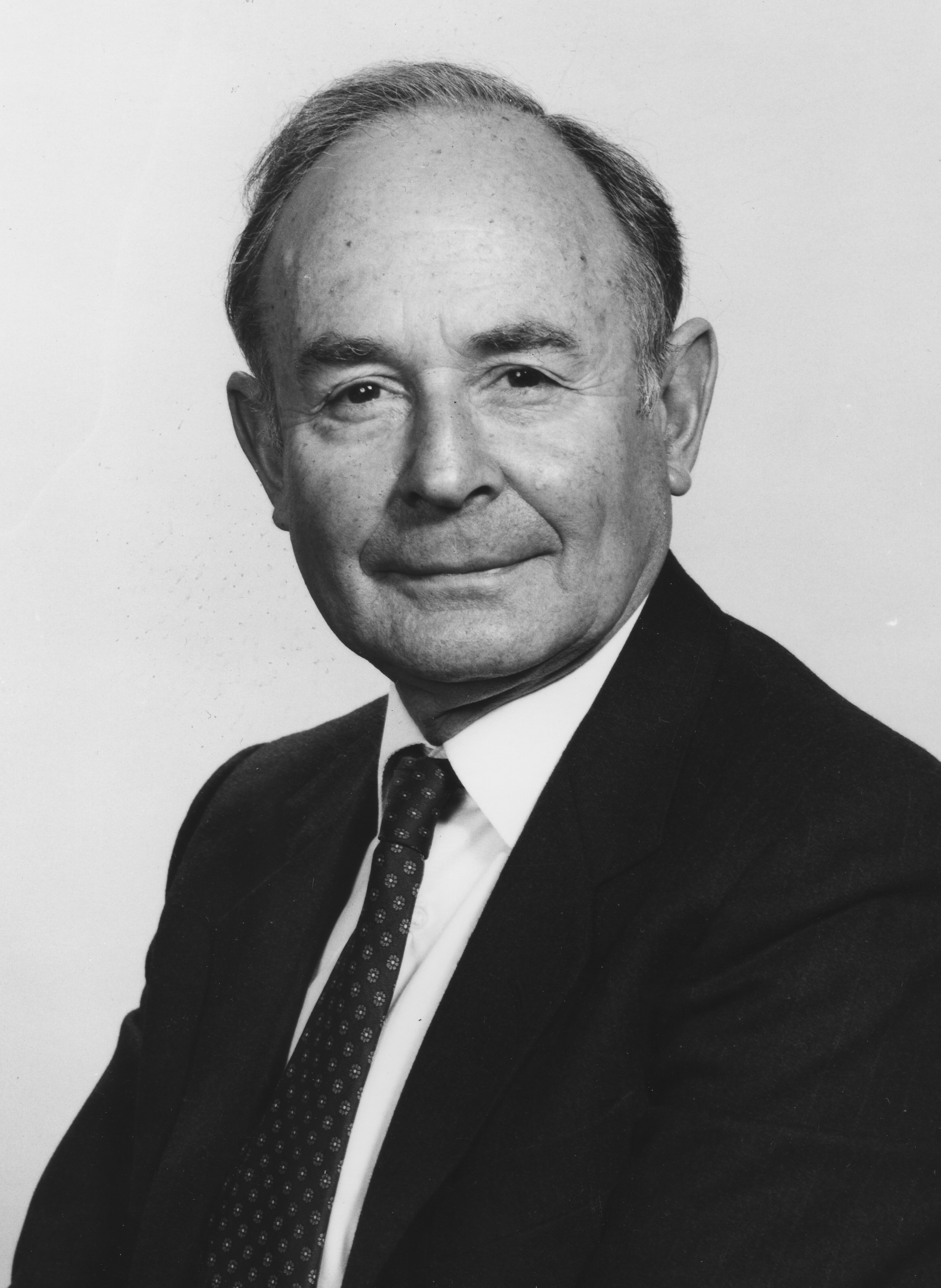
- Born: 4 May 1919; Cape Town, South Africa
- Died: 9 November 2020 (aged 101)
- Occupations: Economist, Professor
- Employer: London School of Economics
- Awards: CBE, Fellow of the British Academy

Academic background
- Education: University of Cape Town

Academic work
- Notable works: Art & Accounting

Basil Selig Yamey CBE FBA (4 May 1919 – 9 November 2020) was a South African economist and expert in the history of accounting.

== Career ==
He was born in Cape Town in South Africa in May 1919, and educated at the University of Cape Town. For many years he was a professor at the London School of Economics. He was a part-time member of the Monopolies and Mergers Commission from 1966 to 1978, and author of many books and articles, including one on the economics of underdeveloped countries co-authored with Peter Thomas Bauer.

Yamey's interest in rational economic decision-making led him to study historical accounting records. Yamey rejected the claim by Werner Sombart that the double-entry bookkeeping system was a pre-condition, or at least an important stimulating factor, for the emergence of modern capitalism. Yamey combined his interest in Accounting History with his love of art (he was a trustee of the National Gallery, London from 1974 to 1981 and of the Tate Gallery, London from 1978 to 1981) in his book Art & Accounting, a richly-illustrated survey of paintings portraying commercial scenes and business-people. He died in November 2020 at the age of 101.

== Selected bibliography ==
=== Journal articles ===
- Peter Thomas Bauer; Basil S. Yamey (1951). "Economic Progress and Occupational Distribution". The Economic Journal. 61 (244): 741–755. doi:10.2307/2226978. JSTOR 2226978.
- Basil S. Yamey (1949). "Scientific bookkeeping and the rise of capitalism". The Economic History Review. 1 (2–3): 99–113. doi:10.1111/j.1468-0289.1949.tb00108.x. JSTOR 2589824.
- Basil S. Yamey (1972). "Predatory Price Cutting: Notes and Comments". The Journal of Law & Economics. 15 (1): 129–142. doi:10.1086/466730. JSTOR 725017. S2CID 153377713.

=== Books ===
- Peter Thomas Bauer; Basil S. Yamey (1957). The Economics of Under-developed Countries. Cambridge University Press – via Internet Archive.
- Basil S. Yamey (1978). Essays on the history of accounting. New York: Arno Press. ISBN 0-405-10933-4 – via Internet Archive.
- Basil S. Yamey (1989). Art & Accounting. New Haven: Yale University Press. ISBN 0-300-04227-2.
