= Re T&D Industries plc =

UK insolvency case concerning administration of a company in financial distress

- Court: High Court (Chancery)
- Decided: 8 November 1999
- Citation: [2000] BCC 956

Case opinions
- Neuberger J

Keywords
- Administration

Re T&D Industries plc [2000] BCC 956 is a UK insolvency law case, concerning the policy of administration of a company in financial distress. It held that administrators have the clear power to deal with the company's property as is necessary if under the pressure of time before there is a creditors' meeting.

== Facts ==
The two administrators of T&D Industries plc (from PWC) wished to dispose of the company's assets before a creditors' meeting had taken place as required by the Insolvency Act 1986 s 24 (now Schedule B1, para 51). Section 17(2)(a) (now updated in schedule B1, para 1) contained the ambiguously worded provision that an administrator can manage the affairs, business and property of the company,

at any time before proposals have been approved … under section 24 … in accordance with any directions given by the court

Counsel for the administrators argued that this should be taken, on a first interpretation, to mean that the administrator could do anything, unless it was prohibited under the administration order for their appointment. Failing that, a second interpretation was that any disposal of the company's assets could be made, so long as the administrator had authorised it.

== Judgment ==
Neuberger J held that court approval was not needed, and the proper interpretation of section 17(2)(a) was that the administrator could do anything, unless it was prohibited under the administration order for their appointment. This was so reading together with section 14(1) which empowered the administrator to do anything necessary for the company's management. Furthermore, the policy of administration favoured expediency, and so section 14 could not be effectively operated, were it otherwise, without the court's sanction. Only one case actually decided the issue, namely, Re Charnley Davies Ltd, and that supported this view. He concluded as follows.

The three aspects I have considered above, namely the statutory language, the policy of the administration system, and the previous authorities, all have features which could be said with force to support each of the two interpretations. The language of the 1986 Act tends, albeit mildly, to support the first interpretation, in my view. Subject to one substantial point of concern, the policy of the administration system, as it appears from the 1986 Act, and indeed from the rules, appears to me to favour the first interpretation. Although there are more cases which can, as it were, be prayed in aid in favour of the second interpretation, it seems to me that the only case where the actual point in issue in the present case was considered and decided was in Charnley Davies (unreported, 21 January 1987) and that decision has not been doubted in any occasion where it has been considered.

Indeed, apart from being cited without disapproval by Millett J, it has been referred to and relied on in The Law and Practice of Corporate Administrations by Fletcher, Higham and Trower (1994, Butterworths) where one finds this in para. 5.4 on p. 69:

‘in principle, even prior to approval of his proposals, an administrator's statutory powers are fully exercisable, notwithstanding the absence of any specific or general direction from the court.’

A footnote to this passage refers to Charnley Davies and then continues:

‘This would appear to follow from the fact that the administration order directs that the affairs, business and property of the company are to be managed by the administrator.’

So far as the four subsequent cases are concerned, it is a telling point that Charnley Davies was not cited in any of them. Further, there are other grounds for saying that each of them is not in point. Either the case was concerned with a different aspect of the 1986 Act, ie s 15 in Consumer & Industrial and a period when s 17(2)(b) applied in Smallman, or it appears the whole application was predicated on the basis that the second interpretation was correct, and either the court had not even considered the first interpretation as in Montin, or the court, while raising the point that the interpretation may or may not be right, was content to proceed on the assumption that it is correct – in Osmosis .

In these circumstances, it appears to me that the first interpretation is to be preferred, albeit that, as I have to said, the issue is a difficult one.

I would like to make the following concluding points. First, my conclusion emphasises the desirability, indeed the need, for administrators to put their proposals under s 23 to the creditors, and to call a creditors' meeting under s. 24, as soon as reasonably possible. Naturally, the administrator will need time to get the necessary information and advice before he can properly make his proposals, and in some cases this may inevitably result in a long delay. However, the sooner he makes his proposals the better. Nothing in this judgment should detract from the emphasis placed by Peter Gibson J in Consumer & Industrial on the desirability of administrators being speedy and efficient in the conduct of the administration.

Secondly, my decision tends to emphasise the fact that a person appointed to act as an administrator may be called upon to make important and urgent decisions. He has a responsible and potentially demanding role. Commercial and administrative decisions are for him, and the court is not there to act as a sort of bomb shelter for him.

Thirdly, administrators should not be able to take unfair advantage of the fact that the creditors' rights are, as it were, limited by s 23–25 . There will be many cases where an administrator will be called upon to make urgent and important decisions and where the urgency means that there is no possibility of a s 24 creditors' meeting being called to consider the decision prior to it having to be made. However, the importance of the decision and the time involved may well be such that the administrator should have what consultation he can with the creditors. An obvious case might be where there were three days to make a decision and there were only four creditors of the company, or there were four creditors who make up 80 per cent in value of the total creditors of the company. In those circumstances, it seems to me that the administrator should at least consider consulting those four creditors. Whether he should effect any consultation, with whom he should effect it, how he should effect it, and what decision he should make following any consultation, must be a matter for him to decide by reference to the facts of the individual case.

Fourthly, there will also occasionally be cases where it would be appropriate for the administrator, one of the creditors who is consulted, or some other third party, at least to consider making an application to the court under s 14(3) or otherwise for directions. An example given by Mr Adkins might be where the administrator wishes to take a course which does not fall within the purposes contemplated by the administration order, either because it is a different purpose under s 8(3) from that for which the administration order was made, or because it is a step different from or even contrary to, that contemplated by the report the court made pursuant to r 2.2 of the Insolvency Rules 1986. Another example might be where the creditors do not agree on a particular course and the administrator has good reason for seeking guidance rather than making up his own mind.

Fifthly, particularly in view of what I have just said, while it may well be appropriate for an administrator to make an application where there is a point of principle at stake or where there is a dispute as to the appropriate course and it is possible for there to be an inter partes hearing, it would require a very unusual case before the court could give any real assistance in circumstances where there cannot be a proper hearing inter partes and where the decision is essentially an administrative or commercial one for the administrator. In many cases the administrator may take the view that his consultations indicate fairly clearly what the decision of the creditors' committee is likely to be and he may be able to take a degree of comfort from that.

Sixthly, in an appropriate case, where an application is made under s 14(3) and the proposed course is sufficiently significant and where there is sufficient time, the administrator may think it right to seek a direction from the court for an early and urgent meeting of the creditors on short notice with a view to considering the specific proposal. That appears to me to be an order that the court could made under s 17(3)(b).

Seventhly, I refer back to the observations of Peter Gibson J, echoed by Harman J, to the effect that if the administrators are proposing to dispose of all of the assets of the company prior to the creditors' meeting, this would result in the creditors' meeting being substantially ineffective. That is a factor which, it appears to me, an administrator should bear in mind when he is considering disposing of all or substantially all of the assets of the company prior to the s. 24 creditors' meeting. However, the weight to be given to that must inevitably depend upon all the factors in the particular case.

== See also ==
- UK insolvency law
- Re Transbus International Ltd [2004] EWHC 932 (Ch)
