= James Neuberger =

James Max Neuberger (born 4 November 1950) is a consultant physician, Queen Elizabeth Hospital, Birmingham, part of University Hospitals Birmingham NHS Foundation Trust, and professor of medicine at the University of Birmingham. He is one of the editors of the journal Transplantation and was the Associate Medical Director (Organ Donation and Transplantation) of NHS Blood and Transplant.

== Education ==
Neuberger was educated at Westminster School and Christ Church, Oxford from where he obtained his MA, BM, BCh and DM.

== Personal life ==
He is the son of Prof. Albert Neuberger, the brother of Prof. Michael Neuberger, Prof. Anthony Neuberger, and David Neuberger, Baron Neuberger of Abbotsbury (President of the Supreme Court of the United Kingdom), and the brother-in-law of Julia Neuberger.
