= The Nigerian Girl Guides Association =

National Guiding organization of Nigeria

- Country: Nigeria
- Founded: 1919
- Membership: 113,726
- Affiliation: World Association of Girl Guides and Girl Scouts

The Nigerian Girl Guides Association is the national Guiding organization of Nigeria. It serves 113,726 members (as of 2006). Founded in 1919, the girls-only organization became a full member of the World Association of Girl Guides and Girl Scouts in 1966. The Association provides girls and young women opportunities to develop leadership and practical skils.

== Nigerian Leadership and Oyinkansola Abayomi ==
Nigerian women have been instrumental to the development of Girl Guiding in Nigeria. A prominent figure is Oyinkansola Abayomi, who had participated in the Girls Guide movement while studying in England. After returning to Lagos in 1920, she joined the Girl Guides movement. She served on the Central Nigeria Executive Committee and rose to become the first Nigerian Girl Guide Captain in 1925.

She used her position to advocate for government funding at a level comparable to what was provided to the Boy Scouts. Her efforts also gradually paved the way for Nigerian leadership, as she was appointed Deputy Commissioner of the Nigerian Girl Guides in 1949, becoming the first African to hold that position. In 1951, she became the first Nigerian Chief Guide Commissioner. She continued to play a key role in the development of the organisation and was elected an honorary life president of the Nigerian Guides Association in 1982.

== Sections ==
Girl are divided into various age groupings:

- Rainbow 4-6
- Brownie 7-10
- Guide 10-16
- Ranger/young leader 16-18

Adults 18 and over can serve as Leaders.

== Promise ==
The Promise closely mirrors those from other countries, the ones listed below are for the Brownie and Guide levels, it is unknown if the other levels have their own promise.

=== Brownie Promise ===
I promise to do my best:
To do my duty to God and my country,
To help other people every day,
especially those at home.

=== Guide Promise ===
'I promise on my honor that i will do my best, To do my duty to God and my country, To help other people at all times and to obey the Guide Law.

== GS Law ==
As with the Promise there are also differences in the Law.

=== Brownie Law ===
1. A Brownie is truthful, obedient and cheerful.
2. A Brownie thinks of others before herself.

=== Guide Law ===
1. A guide's honor is to be trusted.
2. A guide is loyal.
3. A guide's duty is to be useful and to help others.
4. A guide is a friend to all and a sister to every other Guide.
5. A guide is courteous.
6. A guide is a friend to animals.
7. A guide obeys orders.
8. A guide smiles and sings under all difficulties.
9. A guide is thrifty.
10. A guide is pure in thought, word and deed.

== Motto ==
Again, following the differences within levels, here are the motto's of the Brownies and Guides.

- Brownie Motto: Lend a hand
- Guide Motto: Be Prepared

== See also ==
- Oyinkansola Abayomi, former head of the Nigerian Girl Guides Association and the first native Nigerian woman to work for the organization
- Boy Scouts of Nigeria
