= Frieda Goldman-Eisler =

Psychologist

- Born: Frymet Leib; June 9, 1907; Tarnów, Galicia
- Died: January 19, 1982 (aged 74); London, England, UK

Academic background
- Education: University of Vienna
- Thesis: Die Gesellschaftssatire bei Nestroy (1931)

Academic work
- Discipline: Psychologist
- Sub-discipline: Psycholinguistics
- Institutions: University College London

Frieda Goldman-Eisler (born Frymet Leib, also known as Frieda Eisler) (1907–1982) was a psychologist and pioneer in the field of psycholinguistics. She is known for her research on speech disfluencies; a volume dedicated in her honor calls her "the modern pioneer of the science of pausology".

== Life ==
Goldman-Eisler was either born in Tarnów, Galicia or Buchach, Galicia. She was the daughter of a manufacturer.

Goldman-Eisler was German-Jewish, and a communist. After her marriage to the writer Willy Goldman in 1934, due to the growing threat of Nazi Germany, she moved from Austria to London, where she lived the rest of her life. After her marriage to Willy Goldman ended, she married Paul Eisler in 1950.

In the early 1950s, she began pausological experiments, and continued doing research in this area for the rest of her career. She cancelled presenting at a workshop in Kassel in 1978 due to illness, and died in 1982.

== Education and career ==
She earned a PhD in German studies from the University of Vienna in 1931, while also studying psychology under Karl Bühler.

During World War II, Goldman-Eisler briefly worked for Mass Observation. She was also a research assistant for the BBC Listener Research Department from 1941 to 1946.

She was a member of the Medical Research Council's scientific staff at the Maudsley Hospital from 1948 to 1955.

Goldman-Eisler refers to being offered and accepting a "home" in the Department of Phonetics at University College London in 1955, though it is not clear what her position was at that time. In 1965 Goldman-Eisler was appointed a Reader at University College London, where she continued her career. She became the UK's first Professor of Psycholinguistics in 1970. She was eventually given the titles Emeritus Professor of Psycholinguistics and honorary Research Fellow at University College London.

== Publications ==
- Leib, F. 1931. Die Gesellschaftssatire bei Nestroy.
- Goldman-Eisler, Frieda. 1968. Psycholinguistics: Experiments in spontaneous speech.
