= Herman N. Neuberger =

Herman Naftali Neuberger (26 June 1918 – 21 October 2005) was an Orthodox Jewish rabbi who for over fifty years was the leader of Ner Israel Rabbinical College. He was the brother of the physician Albert Neuberger.

== Early years ==
Born in Hassfurt, northern Bavaria, he was the youngest of three children of Max (Meir) Neuburger (1877–1931), cloth merchant and businessman, and Bertha Neuberger (née Hiller), When he was eight years old the Neubergers moved to Würzburg. When he was 13, a few weeks after his bar mitzvah, his father died. As a teenager in Würzburg he met Rabbi Shamshon Rafael Weiss, an affluent Torah scholar who became his mentor and encouraged him to attend a larger yeshiva, so he traveled to Poland to learn in the Mir Yeshiva.

By 1938 Anti-Semitism was growing in Europe due to the rise of the Nazis. A relative of his father in New York was able to send him immigration papers to come to the United States. Not wanting to leave others behind, he arranged for papers for some of his close relatives too. His mother and siblings had already escaped. He also helped Rabbi Dovid Kronglass, who would later become the Mashgiach of Ner Israel, escape.

== In America ==
He studied in Baltimore at Yaakov Yitzchok Ruderman's yeshiva in a local synagogue, named Ner Israel. By 1941 Neuberger was on the Board, helping with administrative functions and arranging for the construction of a new school building on Garrison Blvd.

In 1942 Neuberger married Judy Kramer, Ruderman's sister in-law. They remained married until her death in 1994.

== Emigration from Iran ==
He took part in enabling the emigration of Persian Jewry. In 1975 when Shah Mohammad Reza Pahlavi was still in power in Iran and the country was secular, Jews had few opportunities to study Torah. Neuberger brought a small group of young Iranian Jews to the yeshiva with the intent that they would go back to Iran after receiving their rabbinical degrees to become educators. Before this could happen, the Ayatollah Khomeini's government took power in 1979 creating a more difficult situation for Persian Jews. Through a series of connections, Neuberger worked to help over 60,000 Jews escape from Iran.

== Recognition as a college ==
Neuberger and his friend Rabbi Moshe Sherer started the Association of Advanced Rabbinical and Talmudic Schools to help yeshivas gain recognition amongst American Colleges.

== Around the country ==
Another major accomplishment of Rabbi Neuberger was gathering married bachurim (young yeshiva-men) learning in Kollel Avodas Levi, and sending them out to open outreach kollelim around the country. Today there are kollelim in many cities including Atlanta, Georgia; Phoenix, Arizona; and Columbus and Cincinnati in Ohio.

== Influential Connections ==
He was described as "politically connected" and was an advisor to city, state and Federal officials on matters affecting his school and fellow Jews around the world.

== Legacy ==
He had five children, including his son, Sheftel, a rabbi who succeeded him as President of Ner Israel.
