= Michael Neuberger =

British biochemist and immunologist

Michael Neuberger FRS FMedSci
- Born: Michael Samuel Neuberger; 2 November 1954; London, United Kingdom
- Died: 26 October 2013 (aged 58); Cambridge, United Kingdom
- Education: University of Cambridge; Imperial College London (PhD)
- Spouse: Gillian Anne Pyman
- Children: 4
- Scientific career
- Institutions: Laboratory of Molecular Biology
- Thesis: Transducing phages for analysis of gene duplications (1978)
- Doctoral advisor: Brian S. Hartley

Michael Samuel Neuberger (2 November 1954 – 26 October 2013) was a British biochemist and immunologist.

== Biography ==
Born in Kensington, Michael Samuel Neuberger was the fourth of five children of Albert Neuberger and Lilian Ida (née Dreyfus). He was educated at Westminster School and Trinity College, Cambridge, from where he graduated with a first class honours degree in Natural Sciences in 1974. Neuberger then joined Brian Hartley at Imperial College to study for his PhD. During this time, and at Hartley's suggestion, he visited the South African biologist Sydney Brenner at the Laboratory of Molecular Biology (LMB) in Cambridge. Their discussions drew Neuberger back to the LMB in 1980 and he remained there for the rest of his career, eventually becoming its deputy director. César Milstein at the LMB recommended that Neuberger spent some time studying immunology with Klaus Rajewsky at the University of Cologne; he spent 18 months there, after his PhD.

Neuberger “was probably most widely known for delineating the role of DNA deamination in immunity through his pioneering work that explained how cytosine deamination drives the somatic hypermutation and class-switch recombination of antibody-encoding genes. Following the identification of activation-induced cytidine deaminase (AID) by Honjo and Durandy as the protein essential for both of those processes, Michael produced a series of seminal papers during 2002 that laid bare the mechanism that had perplexed immunologists for 30 years.”

=== Family ===
Michael Neuberger married Gillian Anne (Gill) Pyman, an Australian doctor, on 6 September 1991. They had four children: Saskia, Lydia, Thomas and Benjamin. He died of myeloma, a cancer of antibody-producing cells, at Addenbrooke's Hospital, Cambridge, on 26 October 2013. "At his request, he was buried in a Jewish consecrated grave in the grounds of the Baptist oratory, next to his family weekend home in Suffolk."

== Some key papers ==
- Neuberger, M.S. (1983). "Expression and regulation of immunoglobulin heavy chain gene transfected into lymphoid cells". The EMBO Journal. 2 (8). Wiley: 1373–1378. doi:10.1002/j.1460-2075.1983.tb01594.x. ISSN 0261-4189. PMC 555285. PMID 10872333. S2CID 36917815.
- Neuberger, Michael S.; Williams, Gareth T.; Fox, Robert O. (1984). "Recombinant antibodies possessing novel effector functions". Nature. 312 (5995). Springer Science and Business Media LLC: 604–608. Bibcode:1984Natur.312..604N. doi:10.1038/312604a0. ISSN 0028-0836. PMID 6095112. S2CID 4342212.
- Di Noia, Javier; Neuberger, Michael S. (31 July 2002). "Altering the pathway of immunoglobulin hypermutation by inhibiting uracil-DNA glycosylase". Nature. 419 (6902). Springer Science and Business Media LLC: 43–48. Bibcode:2002Natur.419...43D. doi:10.1038/nature00981. ISSN 0028-0836. PMID 12214226. S2CID 4390343.
- Harris, Reuben S.; Sale, Julian E.; Petersen-Mahrt, Svend K.; Neuberger, Michael S. (2002). "AID Is Essential for Immunoglobulin V Gene Conversion in a Cultured B Cell Line". Current Biology. 12 (5). Elsevier BV: 435–438. doi:10.1016/s0960-9822(02)00717-0. ISSN 0960-9822. PMID 11882297. S2CID 14276978.
- Petersen-Mahrt, Svend K.; Harris, Reuben S.; Neuberger, Michael S. (2002). "AID mutates E. coli suggesting a DNA deamination mechanism for antibody diversification". Nature. 418 (6893). Springer Science and Business Media LLC: 99–104. Bibcode:2002Natur.418...99P. doi:10.1038/nature00862. ISSN 0028-0836. PMID 12097915. S2CID 4388160.
- Rada, Cristina; Williams, Gareth T; Nilsen, Hilde; Barnes, Deborah E; Lindahl, Tomas; Neuberger, Michael S (2002). "Immunoglobulin Isotype Switching Is Inhibited and Somatic Hypermutation Perturbed in UNG-Deficient Mice". Current Biology. 12 (20). Elsevier BV: 1748–1755. doi:10.1016/s0960-9822(02)01215-0. ISSN 0960-9822. PMID 12401169. S2CID 11340281.

== Awards and honours ==
He was elected a Fellow of the Royal Society (FRS) in 1993, “a source of particular pride for his father and a very rare concurrence of father and son as Fellows.” and was awarded their GlaxoSmithKline Prize in 2003. He also received the Novartis medal in 2002 and delivered the Novartis medal lecture, entitled "Antibodies: a Paradigm for the Evolution of Molecular Recognition" on 9 April 2002 at Heriot-Watt University, Edinburgh. He was an inaugural Fellow of the Academy of Medical Sciences. In 2013 Neuberger was appointed a Foreign Associate of the National Academy of Sciences.
