= Stability testing =

Stability testing can refer to:

- In software testing, stability testing is an attempt to determine if an application will crash. Stability testing is a method to check the quality and how the system or software behaves in different environmental parameters like temperature, voltage etc.
- Stability testing (pharmaceutical), process used to determine how well a product retains its quality over the life span of the product
