= Mussett =

Mussett is a surname. Notable people with the surname include:

- Marjorie Mussett (1922–2004), British biologist and endocrinologist
- Tory Mussett (born 1978), Australian actress
