= Joyce Taylor-Papadimitriou =

British molecular biologist and geneticist (born 1932)

Joyce Taylor-Papadimitriou FMedSci
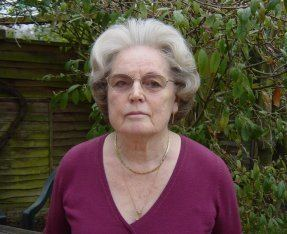
- Born: 1932 (age 93–94); Burnley, Lancashire, England
- Education: University of Cambridge, University of Toronto (PhD)
- Known for: Interferon type 1 requires the synthesis of effector proteins
- Scientific career
- Fields: Molecular biology and genetics
- Doctoral advisor: Louis Siminovitch

Joyce Taylor-Papadimitriou (born 1932) is a British molecular biologist and geneticist. She is Senior Fellow and Visiting Professor at King's College London specialising in the area of cellular, genetic and proteomic studies on patient breast tumour samples, and works within the Breast Cancer Biology Group. She was the first to identify that the action of interferon type 1 requires the synthesis of effector proteins.

== Early life and education ==
Joyce Taylor-Papadimitriou was born in 1932 in Burnley, Lancashire. She read biochemistry at the University of Cambridge, graduating in 1954. Further study led to a PhD at the University of Toronto, supervised by Louis Siminovitch.

== Career ==
As an early career researcher, Taylor-Papadimitriou worked at the National Institute for Medical Research (NIMR), London with Alick Isaacs. Here she found that the action of type 1 interferons requires effector protein synthesis. She worked in Greece for eight years following NIMR, returning to England after to set up her own lab at the Imperial Cancer Research Fund (ICRF).

Her work has included identifying and characterising the MUC1 membrane mucin, a breast and ovarian tumour associated antigen which is over expressed and aberrantly glycosylated in these tissues. Immunogens based on the MUC1 mucin are in various clinical trials.

Her most highly cited paper, Sandra J. GendlerS, Carole A. Lancaster, Joyce Taylor-Papadimitriou, Trevor Duhig, Nigel Peat, Joy Burchell, Lucy Pemherton, El-Nasir Lalani, and David Wilson " Molecular Cloning and Expression of Human Tumor-associated Polymorphic Epithelial Mucin*" Journal of Biological Chemistry 265:15286-93 (1990) has been cited 1039 times. The most cited paper of which she is first author, Joyce Taylor-Papadimitriou1, J. A. Peterson2, J. Arklie1, Joy Burchell1, R. L. Ceriani2 and W. F. Bodmer1 "Monoclonal antibodies to epithelium‐specific components of the human milk fat globule membrane: Production and reaction with cells in culture" International Journal of Cancer Volume 28, Issue 1, pages 17–21, 15 July 1981 has been cited 698 times.

== Honours and awards ==
Taylor-Papadimitriou was elected a Fellow of the Academy of Medical Sciences in 2001.
