= Electronic common technical document =

The electronic common technical document (eCTD) is an interface and international specification for the pharmaceutical industry to transfer regulatory information to regulatory agencies. The specification is based on the Common Technical Document (CTD) format and was developed by the International Council for Harmonisation (ICH) Multidisciplinary Group 2 Expert Working Group (ICH M2 EWG).

== History ==
Version 2.0 of eCTD – an upgrade over the original CTD – was finalized on February 12, 2002, and version 3.0 was finalized on October 8 of the same year. As of August 2016, the most current version is 3.2.2, released on July 16, 2008.

A Draft Implementation Guide (DIG) for version 4.0 of eCTD was released in August 2012. However, work stalled on the project. An additional Draft Implementation Guide was released in February 2015 The ICH and the FDA released draft specifications and guides in April 2016, and on May 13 there was an ICH "teleconference" to discuss the guidance and any queries or clarifications that might be necessary.

=== U.S. ===
On May 5, 2015, the U.S. Food & Drug Administration published a final, binding guidance document requiring certain submissions in electronic (eCTD) format within 24 months. The projected date for mandatory electronic submissions is May 5, 2017 for New Drug Applications (NDAs), Biologic License Applications (BLAs), Abbreviated New Drug Applications (ANDAs) and Drug Master Files (DMFs).

=== Canada ===
Health Canada was a sponsor and an early adopter of the eCTD workflow, especially for its Health Products and Food Branch regulator, but as of April 2015 had not yet fully automated it.

=== E.U. ===
The E.U. and its European Medicines Agency (EMA) began accepting eCTD submissions in 2003. In February 2015, the "EMA announced it would no longer accept paper application forms for products applying to the centralized procedure beginning 1 July 2015." The EMA verified on that date that it would no longer accept "human and veterinary centralised procedure applications" and that all electronic application forms would have to be eCTD by January 2016.

=== China ===
In November 2017, China Food and Drug Administration (CFDA) publishes draft eCTD structure for drug registration for public consultations. This is a big transition for China to move from paper submission to eCTD submissions.

=== Japan ===
The Japan Pharmaceuticals and Medical Devices Agency (PMDA) has been eCTD compliant at least since December 2017.

== Governing specifications ==
The Electronic Common Technical Document Specification, the main ICH standard, largely determines the structure of an eCTD submission. However, additional specifications may be applied in national and continental contexts. In the United States, the Food and Drug Administration (FDA) layers additional specifications onto its requirements for eCTD submissions, including PDF, transmission, file format, and supportive file specifications. In the European Union, the European Medicines Agency's EU Module 1 specification as well as other QA documents lay out additional requirements for eCTD submissions.

== Pharmaceutical point of view ==
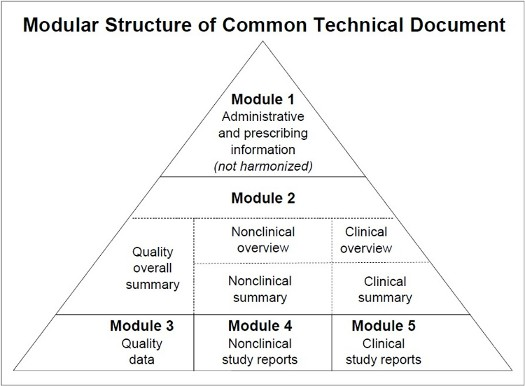

The eCTD has five modules:

1. Administrative information and prescribing information.
2. Common technical document summaries.
3. Quality.
4. Nonclinical study reports.
5. Clinical study reports

A full table of contents could be quite large.

There are two categories of modules:

- Regional module: 1 (different for each region; i.e., country)
- Common modules: 2–5 (common to all the regions)

The CTD defines the content only of the common modules. The contents of the Regional Module 1 are defined by each of the ICH regions (USA, Europe and Japan).

== IT point of view ==
=== eCTD (data structure) ===
The eCTD is a message specification for the transfer of files and metadata from a submitter to a receiver. The primary technical components are:

- A high level folder structure (required)
- An XML "backbone" file that provides metadata about content files and lifecycle instructions for the receiving system
- An optional lower level folder structure (recommended folder names are provided in Appendix 4 of the eCTD specification)
- Associated document type definitions (DTDs) and stylesheets.

Each submission message constitutes one "sequence". A cumulative eCTD consists of one or more sequences. While a single sequence may be viewed with web browser and the ICH stylesheet provided, viewing a cumulative eCTD requires specialized eCTD viewers.

The top part of the directory structure is as follows:

ctd-123456/0000/index.xml
ctd-123456/0000/index-md5.txt
ctd-123456/0000/m1
ctd-123456/0000/m2
ctd-123456/0000/m3
ctd-123456/0000/m4
ctd-123456/0000/m5
ctd-123456/0000/util

The string ctd-123456/0000 is just an example.

==== Backbone (header) ====
This is the file index.xml in the submission sequence number folder. For example:

ctd-123456/0000/index.xml

The purpose of this file is twofold:

- Manage meta-data for the entire submission
- Constitute a comprehensive table of contents and provide corresponding navigation aid.

==== Stylesheets ====
Stylesheets that support the presentation and navigation should be included. They must be placed in the directory:

ctd-123456/0000/util/style

See entry 377 in Appendix 4.

==== DTDs ====
DTDs must be placed in the directory:

ctd-123456/0000/util/dtd

See entries 371–76 in Appendix 4. They must follow a naming convention.

The DTD of the backbone is in Appendix 8. It must be placed in the above directory.

=== Business process (protocol) ===
The business process to be supported can be described as follows:

 Industry <-----> Message <-----> Agency

The lifecycle management is composed at least of:

- Initial submission: should be self-contained.
- Incremental updates: with its sequence number.

== See also ==
- Clinical trial
- Clinical Data Interchange Standards Consortium
- European Medicines Agency (EMA)
- Food and Drug Administration (FDA)
- Ministry of Health, Labour and Welfare (Japan).
- Russian Ministry of Healthcare and Social Development (Russia).
