= Standard for Exchange of Non-clinical Data =

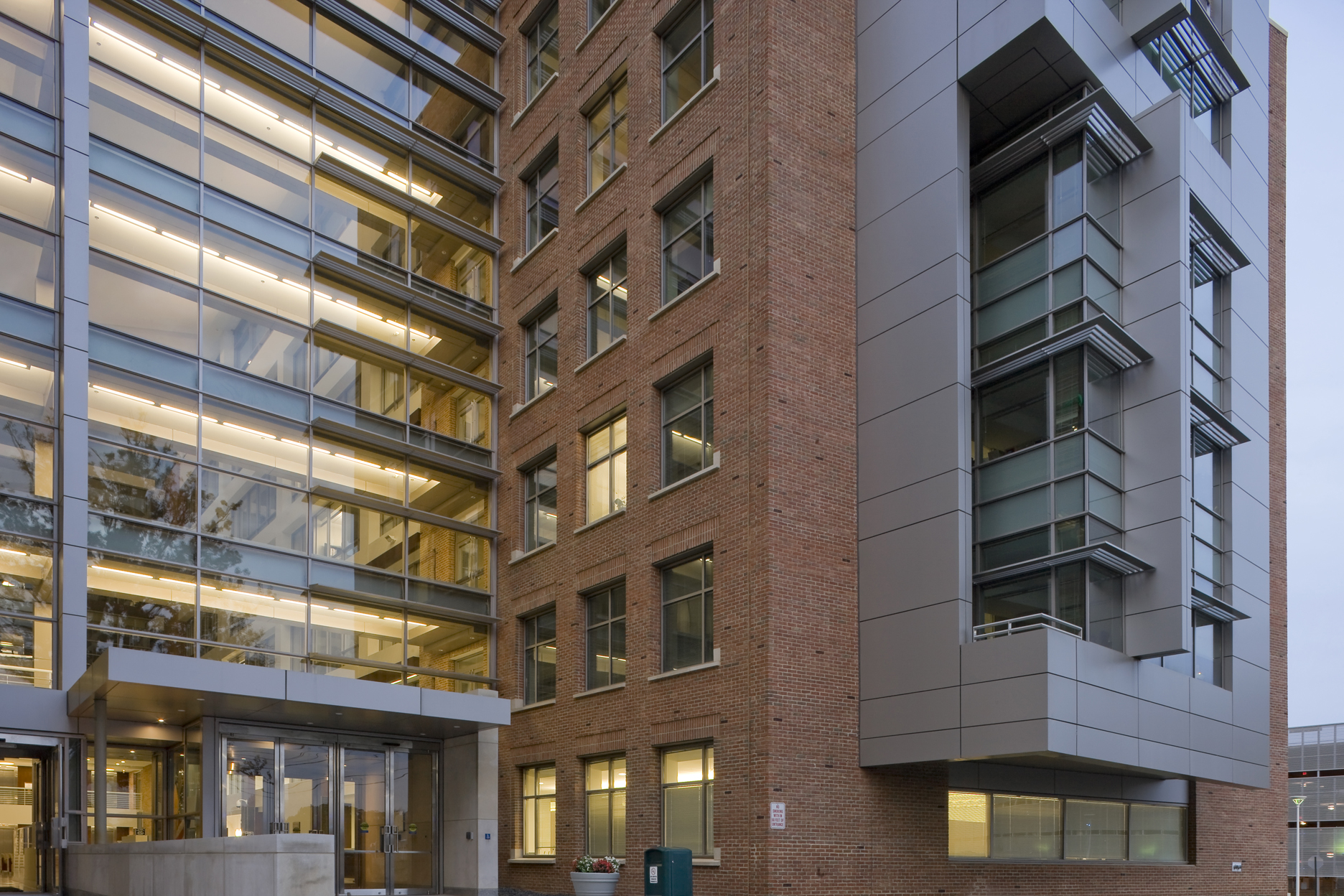
An FDA building.

The Standard for Exchange of Nonclinical Data (SEND) is an implementation of the CDISC Standard Data Tabulation Model (SDTM) for nonclinical studies, which specifies a way to present nonclinical data in a consistent format. These types of studies are related to animal testing conducted during drug development. Raw data of toxicology animal studies started after December 18, 2016 to support submission of new drugs to the US Food and Drug Administration will be submitted to the agency using SEND.

Having a common model to which the industry can conform enables benefits such as the ability for vendors to develop tools, for inter-organizational data exchange that is consistent in format regardless of the parties involved, and so on.

A SEND package consists of a few parts, but the main focus is on individual endpoint data. Endpoints typically map to domains (essentially, datasets), with a number of variables (a.k.a., columns or fields).

== Implementation ==
The SEND Implementation Guide (SENDIG) is a document that provides implementers with specifications for implementing SEND, including how to model various nonclinical endpoints, rules to doing so, and examples with sample data. This document is available on the CDISC SEND website.

Supplementing the guide is the SEND Implementation Wiki hosted by PhUSE designed to assist with the implementation process and filling in some of the gaps, most notably containing:

- SEND, CT, and Define.xml Fundamentals pages – providing more approachable descriptions of fundamental concepts in SEND
- Getting SEND-ready – to help new implementers get started
- FAQ – providing a large, evolving list of commonly asked questions

Companion to the wiki is the SEND Implementation Forum, which allows implementers to ask questions and get responses from SEND experts. New implementers are encouraged to ask questions here.

== History ==
The work on this standard began in July 2002—subsequently, a U.S. Food and Drug Administration pilot project was initiated in July 2003 through a Cooperative Research and Development Agreement (CRADA). Feedback from this pilot and continuous efforts to more closely align this implementation with the SDTM for human clinical trials led to development of SEND 2.3, but without widespread adoption.

In 2006, with renewed FDA interest, the industry met to revive SEND and work on a version that, with FDA backing, would cover regulatory submission as well as operational data transfer needs. By 2007, an FDA pilot was announced, during which time the SEND team worked on the SENDIG (implementation guide).

SENDIG 3.0 was released to production in July 2011. This was soon followed by the FDA's statement of preference for SEND datasets.

In December 2014, the FDA CDER and CBER divisions released guidance for industry enforcing the usage of SEND as part of Investigational New Drug (IND) and Biologic License Application (BLA) submission to the US Food and Drug Administration. All studies started after December 15, 2016 supporting IND and BLA submissions will need to be compliant with SEND. The Pharmaceuticals and Medical Devices Agency in Japan will enforce its use in the future, most probably in 2020. The European Medicines Agency also expressed interest and is recommending the use of SEND.

SENDIG 3.1 was released in June 2016, extending the format with new data domains. SENDIG-DART 1.1 was released in December 2017. SENDIG-DART is a standard which extends the SENDIG 3.1 standard for use with Segment II Development and Reproductive Toxicology Studies. Consider the SENDIG and the PhUSE SEND Implementation Wiki pages for additional related information.

== See also ==
- CDISC
- SDTM
- PhUSE
