= CEPR =

The acronym CEPR may refer to:

- Centre for Economic Policy Research, a London-based European network of economists, founded in 1983
- Center for Economic and Policy Research, a progressive think tank in Washington, D.C., founded in 1999
- Centre for Emergency Preparedness and Response, a subagency of the Public Health Agency of Canada
- Centre for Emergency Preparedness and Response, a subagency of the Health Protection Agency in the United Kingdom
