= Official Medicines Control Laboratory =

Official Medicines Control Laboratory (OMCL) is the term coined in Europe for a public institute in charge of controlling the quality of medicines and, depending on the country, other similar products (for example, medical devices). They are part of or report to national competent authorities (NCAs).

By testing medicines independently of manufacturers (that is, without any conflict of interest and with guaranteed impartiality), OMCLs play a fundamental role in ensuring the quality and contributing to the safety and efficacy of medicines, whether already on the market or not, for human and veterinary use.

OMCLs assess human and veterinary medicines to determine whether they meet the relevant requirements for content, purity, etc., as specified in the marketing authorisation dossier or an official pharmacopoeia. They can also check whether packaging and labelling comply with legal requirements, and provide support during quality assessment, good manufacturing practice (GMP) inspections and investigations of quality defects and pharmacovigilance. Investigations may also be carried out on products suspected of being falsified, in support of police, customs, health or judicial authorities. OMCLs also actively contribute to the development and verification of pharmacopoeial methods.

To take into account the cross-border and global dimension of medicines markets, OMCLs co-operate actively at the European level and beyond. They do so through the General European OMCL Network (GEON), which was set up jointly by the Council of Europe and the European Commission (EC) in 1995. A number of non-European OMCLs have joined the network as associate members.

The GEON, which comprises over 70 OMCLs from over 40 different countries, is co-ordinated by the Strasbourg-based European Directorate for the Quality of Medicines & HealthCare (EDQM) of the Council of Europe, an international organisation upholding human rights, democracy and the rule of law in Europe. A list of network members is publicly available on the EDQM homepage.

The network supports laboratories across Europe in making the best use of their expertise, technical capacity and financial resources, in order to ensure the appropriate control of medicines in Europe. This is done by organising co-ordinated testing programmes, meetings, training, audits and tailored Proficiency Testing Schemes (PTSs) and by providing the necessary (IT) infrastructure. The activities of the GEON are co-funded by the Council of Europe and the European Union.

OMCLs play an essential role in the Official Control Authority Batch Release (OCABR) procedure, which is foreseen in EU legislation. Under this procedure, each batch of vaccine for human use, medicinal product derived from human blood or plasma (e.g. clotting factors, human albumin) or immunological veterinary medicinal product (e.g. veterinary vaccine) undergoes independent quality control, including testing, by an OMCL after release by the manufacturer and before it reaches the patient. The legislation requires mutual recognition of test results among the member states (EU/EEA), so the OMCLs involved work together as a network to ensure that any batch is tested in only one OMCL, under agreed conditions, for the benefit of all.

== See also ==
- Public health laboratory
