= National Institute for Biological Standards and Control =

British biological standardisation body

- Abbreviation: NIBSC
- Formation: 1972
- Legal status: Government agency
- Location: Blanche Lane, Ridge, Herts, UK
- Region served: UK
- Members: 300 staff (200 scientists)
- Parent organization: Medicines and Healthcare products Regulatory Agency
- Affiliations: BBSRC, MRC, WHO, NHS, DstlDHSC
- Website: www.nibsc.org

The National Institute for Biological Standards and Control (NIBSC) is a government agency that works in the field of biological standardisation and is part of the United Kingdom's Medicines and Healthcare products Regulatory Agency (MHRA). It is responsible for developing and producing over 90% of the biological international standards in use around the world.

The Institute is the UK's Official Medicines Control Laboratory, responsible for independent regulatory testing of biological medicines within the framework of the European Union. It is also host to the UK's stem cell bank and is a key research centre in the field of pandemic influenza.

== History ==
The NIBSC began work in May 1972. The National Biological Standards Board was formed in 1975 at the NIMR in Mill Hill. A site was selected and the new £25m building opened in 1987, although it was officially opened in 1988. It has 4,500 square metres of laboratories. NIBSC employs around 300 staff, 200 of whom are scientists.

In February 2008, it featured in a thirty-minute programme on BBC Radio 4 in the Secret Science two-part series (the other programme was about the Health Protection Agency's Centre for Emergency Preparedness and Response at Porton Down).

In April 2009, NIBSC became a centre of the UK Health Protection Agency. In April 2013, NIBSC left that agency and was merged with the UK's Medicines and Healthcare products Regulatory Agency (MHRA).

== Functions ==
The agency produces WHO International Standards for substances such as antibiotics, enzymes, antibodies and hormones, and methods such as blood transfusions. These standards are part of global health efforts and pharmaceutical research, and over 10,000 standards a month are shipped worldwide.

It is the UK's Official Medicines Control Laboratory.

== Facilities ==
New buildings for the UK Stem Cell Bank (which has been on the site since May 2004 and was Europe's first stem cell bank) and Influenza Resource Centre were built on the site in a £12m development by Morgan Ashurst, and opened in December 2009.

== See also ==
- European Directorate for the Quality of Medicines & HealthCare
- European Medicines Agency
