= Mary C. Lobban =

British physiologist

- Born: 1922
- Died: June 14, 1982 (aged 59–60); St. John's, Newfoundland and Labrador, Canada
- Citizenship: British
- Known for: circadian rhythms
- Scientific career
- Fields: Physiology
- Institutions: University of Cambridge, National Institute for Medical Research and Memorial University of Newfoundland

Mary Constance Cecile Lobban (1922–1982) was a British physiologist who studied circadian rhythms.

Lobban was a Senior Demonstrator in Physiology in the Physiological Laboratory at the University of Cambridge from 1955 to 1959. From 1959 to 1974 she worked at the National Institute for Medical Research's Hampstead laboratories.

During the Cambridge Physiological Expeditions of the 1950s, Lobban conducted research into the sleep rhythms of volunteers in Spitsbergen, Norway, where the sun does not set during the summer months. Volunteers were separated into two groups and given wristwatches that were set to either 21- or 27-hour days. She later studied the renal circadian rhythms of people living in the Arctic and near the Equator. At the Victoria General Hospital in Halifax, she studied the effects of nurses changing their schedules from 8-hour to 12-hour shifts.

In 1978, she became a Professor of Environmental Physiology at Memorial University of Newfoundland where she taught nephrology and human physiology.

After suffering a stroke in May 1981, Lobban's health declined. She died on 14 June 1982 in Newfoundland. The Canadian Coast Guard scattered her ashes in the Canadian high Arctic.

== Publications ==
- Lewis, P. R.; Lobban, Mary C. (September 1956). "Patterns of electrolyte excretion in human subjects during a prolonged period of life on a 22-hour day". The Journal of Physiology. 133 (3): 670–680. doi:10.1113/jphysiol.1956.sp005617. PMC 1359128. PMID 13368113.
- Lewis, P. R.; Lobban, Mary C. (1957). "Dissociation of diurnal rhythms in human subjects living on abnormal time routines". Experimental Physiology. 42 (4): 371–386. doi:10.1113/expphysiol.1957.sp001281. PMID 13494673.
- Folkard, Simon; Monk, Timothy H.; Lobban, Mary C. (October 1978). "Short and Long-term Adjustment of Circadian Rhythms in ' Permanent ' Night Nurses". Ergonomics. 21 (10): 785–799. doi:10.1080/00140137808931782. PMID 729546.
