= European Directorate for the Quality of Medicines & HealthCare =

International organisation

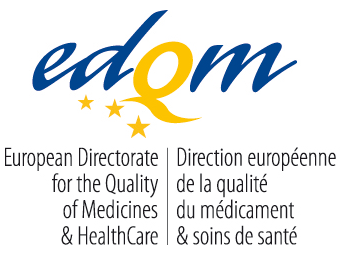

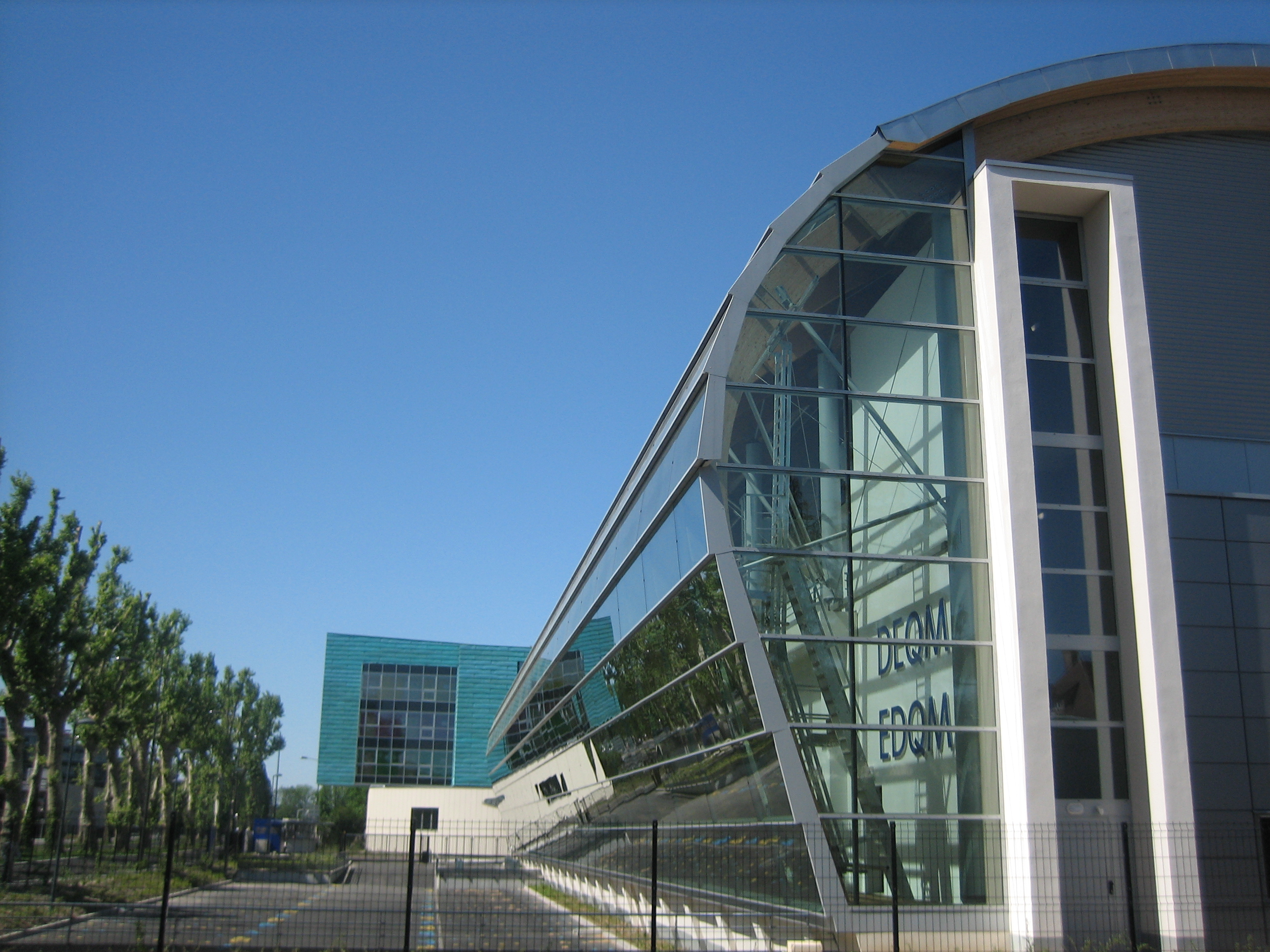
- EDQM building in Strasbourg
- Abbreviation: EDQM
- Predecessor: European Pharmacopoeia (1964–1996); European Directorate for the Quality of Medicines (1996–2007)
- Formation: 1964
- Type: Administrative entity of the Council of Europe
- Headquarters: Strasbourg, France
- Services: Protection of public health
- Director: Eugenia Cogliandro (from 17 June 2025)
- Staff: Over 340 (February 2020)
- Website: www.edqm.eu

The European Directorate for the Quality of Medicines & HealthCare (EDQM) is an agency and partial agreement of the Council of Europe that traces its origins and statutes to the Convention on the Elaboration of a European Pharmacopoeia (an international treaty adopted by the Council of Europe in 1964: ETS 50, Protocol).

The signatories to the convention – 39 member states and the European Union (EU) as of March 2020 – are committed to the harmonisation of quality standards for safe medicines throughout the European continent and beyond. In addition to the member states there are currently 30 observers, including the World Health Organization (WHO) and the Taiwan Food and Drug Administration (TFDA). The EDQM's quality standards for medicines are published in the European Pharmacopoeia (officially abbreviated to Ph. Eur.), which is recognised as a scientific benchmark worldwide and is legally binding in member states.

The EU pharmaceutical legislation refers directly to the Ph. Eur. and to other activities for which the EDQM is responsible (e.g. the Certification procedure or "CEP" and the OMCL Network – see below), demonstrating the shared commitment of the European organisations to public health protection.

The EDQM is also involved in a number of international collaboration and harmonisation initiatives, such as the Pharmacopoeial Discussion Group (PDG), the International Pharmaceutical Regulators Programme (IPRP), the International Council for Harmonisation of Technical Requirements for Pharmaceuticals for Human Use (ICH), the International Meeting of World Pharmacopoeias (IMWP), the Pharmaceutical Inspection Convention and Pharmaceutical Inspection Co-operation Scheme (PIC/S) and the International API Inspection Programme (co-ordinated by the European Medicines Agency, or EMA).

In addition, the EDQM works closely with World Health Organization (WHO) on the establishment, monitoring and distribution of WHO International Standards for Antibiotics (ISA) and WHO International Chemical Reference Substances (ICRS) which are necessary to apply the tests described in the WHO International Pharmacopoeia.

The EDQM therefore plays an essential role in the complex regulatory framework for medicines in Europe. Its primary purpose is to protect public health by enabling the development, supporting the implementation and monitoring the application of quality standards for safe medicines and their safe use.

== The EDQM’s mission ==
Within the Council of Europe, the EDQM's mission is to contribute to the basic human right of access to good quality medicines and healthcare, and to promote and protect human and animal health by:

- establishing and providing official standards for the manufacture and quality control of medicines in all the signatory states of the Convention on the Elaboration of a European Pharmacopoeia, and beyond;
- granting Certificates of suitability to manufacturers whose pharmaceutical substances comply with Ph. Eur. standards, and carrying out inspections of the manufacturing sites concerned;
- co-ordinating a network of Official Medicines Control Laboratories (OMCLs) to collaborate and share expertise between member states and optimise the use of available resources, with the aim of achieving effective independent quality control of medicines in Europe and beyond;
- proposing ethical, safety and quality standards for blood transfusions (collection, preparation, storage, distribution and appropriate use of blood components) and the transplantation of organs, tissues and cells;
- working with national, European and international organisations in the fight against falsification of medical products and similar crimes;
- providing policies and model approaches for the safe use of medicines in Europe, including guidelines on pharmaceutical care; and
- establishing standards for cosmetics and food contact materials and articles, and co-ordinating the independent control of cosmetics.

== Leadership ==
Directors:

- Petra Dörr (as of 1 October 2021)
- Susanne Keitel (1 October 2007 – 30 September 2021)
- Agnès Artiges (1994 – 31 July 2007)

== Activities related to the quality of medicines ==
=== The European Pharmacopoeia: setting quality standards for Europe and beyond and supplying pharmaceutical reference standards ===
Published and regularly updated by the EDQM or Council of Europe in English and French, the two official languages of the Council of Europe, the Ph. Eur. is a compendium of official quality standards for medicines and their ingredients. It thus helps define the requirements to be met by manufacturers seeking to obtain marketing authorisation (MA) for a (human or veterinary) medicinal product in Europe, but its standards are also recognised and used worldwide as a scientific benchmark in the field of quality control for human and veterinary medicines.

These common harmonised quality standards – known as monographs – describe strict specifications for medicines and the substances used in their manufacture, that apply throughout the product's entire life cycle. When adopted, they are legally binding and become mandatory on the same date in the 39 European countries that are signatories to the Ph. Eur. convention, applying to all medicines on their markets.

The contents of the Ph. Eur. are elaborated and updated by the Ph. Eur. Commission, which is responsible for overseeing the practical work of more than 800 experts in every field of the pharmaceutical sciences – all volunteers – who participate in currently 61 groups of experts and working parties. The Ph. Eur. Commission decides on the work programme, appoints the experts and adopts the monographs and other texts that comprise the Ph. Eur. (Articles 6 and 7, Ph. Eur. convention. It meets three times a year in Strasbourg (France) and takes all technical decisions by a unanimous vote. The EDQM provides the scientific secretariat and logistical support for the work of the Ph. Eur. Commission, and facilitates the activities of its groups of experts and working parties.

The texts of the Ph. Eur. cover all therapeutic areas and comprise:

- individual monographs describing legally binding quality standards for medicines and the ingredients used in their manufacture (active ingredients, excipients, herbals, etc.);
- individual monographs describing legally binding quality standards for medicinal products;
- general monographs describing legally binding quality standards for classes of substances (such as fermentation products or substances for pharmaceutical use) or for the different dosage forms that medicines can take (tablets, capsules, injections, etc.); and,
- general methods of analysis for substances used in the manufacture of medicines, which are not legally binding and may also be used for substances and medicines not described in the Ph. Eur.

All the analytical methods described in the monographs are experimentally verified. In addition, the EDQM is responsible for establishing and supplying the official reference standards without which it would be impossible to carry out many of the mandatory quality control tests described in the Ph. Eur. These physical standards are used by manufacturers located both in Europe and around the world, and national and European authorities involved in the quality control of medicines, to name but a few. The EDQM publishes a new edition of the Ph. Eur. every three years.

The current chair of the commission is professor Salvador Cañigueral, who was elected in March 2022.

=== The Certification procedure: evaluating the quality of active ingredients and excipients and inspecting manufacturing sites ===
The EDQM runs a quality evaluation programme for active ingredients and excipients used in the manufacture of medicines. The Certification of Suitability to the Monographs of the European Pharmacopoeia procedure was initially set up in 1992 as a pilot programme but went on to become routine for chemical substances in 1994; it was expanded in 2003 to include herbal drugs (active substances obtained from plants). Granted after an assessment of the documentation submitted by the applicant, a Certificate of Suitability (CEP) provides proof that the methods used by a manufacturer or distributor result in a product whose quality complies with the requirements laid down in the corresponding Ph. Eur. monograph(s). The EDQM also runs an inspection programme for CEP-holders, targeting their manufacturing and/or distribution sites.

The Certification procedure is not compulsory: it is a service that is offered to manufacturers who can submit their CEP in the quality section of a new marketing authorisation application or a variation of an existing marketing authorisation. It serves to centralise the evaluation of data for the benefit of both regulatory authorities and industry, thus saving time and resources.

A further advantage of the Certification procedure is that it provides the Ph. Eur. Commission with up-to-date information on the quality of substances on the European market, highlighting where Ph. Eur. texts and quality requirements might require revision and helping to ensure that the pharmacopoeia remains state-of-the-art.

CEPs – which are referred to in EU pharmaceutical legislation – are accepted by the Ph. Eur. member states and by a number of other countries and regions, including Australia, Canada, New Zealand, Saudi Arabia, Singapore, South Africa, Taiwan and Tunisia. An increasing number of licensing authorities worldwide accept CEPs to support (fully or partially) the data related to the quality of active ingredients used in medicinal products.

As previously stated, a CEP is granted after members of the EDQM's panel of assessors (drawn from national medicines agencies throughout Europe) have reviewed a detailed dossier submitted by the manufacturer. This dossier describes the manufacturing process and the tests performed on the raw materials and on the substance produced, as well as the necessary in-process controls. The manufacturer must demonstrate that the article complies with the quality standards laid down in Ph. Eur. and the EU legislation and that the monograph can be used to control impurities, unwanted chemicals that can be present in a substance for a variety of reasons. The applicant must also agree to comply with the relevant EU good manufacturing practice guidelines (GMP guide) as defined in Part II of the GMP Guide, and to accept an on site inspection at any time at the request of the EDQM.

=== The OMCL network: quality control of medicines on the market ===
On 26 May 1994, the European Commission and the Council of Europe decided to launch a new, jointly funded, co-operative venture targeting the quality control of medicines for human and veterinary use on the market, called the European Network of Official Medicines Control Laboratories (OMCLs). Open to both member states and observers of the Ph. Eur. convention, this network is made up of independent public laboratories that have been appointed by their respective national authorities. Their primary mission is to ensure, through random sample testing, that medicines supplied to patients – wherever they are in Europe – comply with the applicable quality standards and the terms and conditions of their MA.

The laboratories that form the network share resources, expertise and workloads: this not only contributes to reducing public health expenditure, a broader coverage of medicines on the market and to the development of future harmonised common standards, but means that laboratories across Europe have access to state-of-the-art technology and selective analytical procedures.

Nowadays many laboratories within the network have seen a significant shift from medicines on the market testing to the analysis of falsified and illegal medicines on behalf of other authorities such as customs, police, enforcement/food inspectors and courts.

The EDQM is responsible for co-ordinating the network's technical activities and ensuring the smooth running of its various joint programmes.

The OMCL Network performs studies on medicinal products already on the market (market surveillance studies). The EDQM organises inter-laboratory testing activities for OMCLs to improve their analytical performance (proficiency testing scheme [PTS] studies and promotes common quality management systems in all OMCLs to enable work-sharing and mutual recognition of test results.

The EDQM also provides the technical secretariat for the Official Control Authority Batch Release (OCABR) procedures for human and veterinary immunological medicinal products (e.g. vaccines) and human blood-derived medicinal products (e.g. clotting factor, immunoglobulin, albumin. For example, the OCABR procedure guarantees that for the vast majority of the vaccines used in the EU, no batch of vaccine is released to the market in member states without first undergoing an independent quality control by a laboratory of the OMCL Network in addition to the release test conducted by the manufacturer.

=== Pharmaceutical care and combating falsified medical products ===
According to WHO, it is estimated that half of all medicines worldwide are inappropriately prescribed, dispensed or sold, and that half of all patients fail to take their medicines properly. Errors related to medication use, lack of documentation on how medicines are prescribed, used and dispensed, as well as insufficient communication have a considerable impact on national mortality and morbidity rates. Therefore, the safe and appropriate use of medicines, which depends on the right information being available to those that need it, is as important as product quality.

In order to face this challenge while taking into account current constraints on public health budgets and social inequality in access to healthcare, the European Committee on Pharmaceuticals and Pharmaceutical Care (CD-P-PH), which is co-ordinated by the EDQM, oversees the work of experts in three main areas:

- The classification of medicines authorised in Europe into prescription and non-prescription medicines: although the responsibility for classifying medicines lies with the individual member state, the CD-P-PH issues classification recommendations. These recommendations may also cover medicines that are not licensed for use in the EU, since the EDQM has a broader membership and CD-P-PH members include representatives of member states that are not part of the EU. The recommendations are updated annually and published on the EDQM's website. The EDQM also hosts the publicly available Melclass database, which presents the classification status of medicines in Ph. Eur. member states.
- Setting quality and safety standards in pharmaceutical practices and pharmaceutical care: public authorities and the pharmaceutical industry devote much of their resources to ensuring the quality, safety and efficacy of medicines. However, the best treatment outcomes are only achieved when medicines are used safely and appropriately. The CD-P-PH develops scientific indicators to measure the quality of pharmaceutical care in Europe, a concept defined as "the responsible provision of drug therapy for the purpose of achieving definite outcomes that improve a patient’s quality of life". The indicators developed by the EDQM provide practical information that is of use to policymakers and professional associations on a daily basis, helping to make healthcare systems more responsible and cost-effective.
- Preventing and managing risks posed by falsified medical products: falsified medical products pose a growing and real threat to public health in Europe and world-wide. Falsified medicines and medical devices may contain poor quality ingredients, the wrong dosage of an active substance, a different active substance or even a poisonous substance, they may be deliberately mislabelled or have fake packaging or ingredients. To combat this problem, the Council of Europe established the MEDICRIME Convention (CETS No. 211), the first international treaty to criminalise the falsification of medical products and similar crimes with a view to protecting public health. The convention entered into force on 1 January 2016.

== Activities related to patient and consumer protection ==
=== Blood transfusion ===
The work of the EDQM in the area of blood transfusion is co-ordinated by the European Committee on Blood Transfusion (CD-P-TS), which consists of representatives from authorities working in the field of blood transfusion or at national blood establishments (BEs) from member states of the council of Europe and observers such as the European Commission, WHO, the USFDA and the Council of Europe's Committee on Bioethics (DH-BIO). These experts work together on the ethical, legal and organisational aspects of blood transfusion with a view to ensuring quality, increasing availability, avoiding wastage, ensuring optimal use of blood supplies and analysing the possible ethical and organisational impact of new scientific developments. One outcome of this work, the "Guide to the preparation, use and quality assurance of blood components", provides recommendations on blood collection, blood components, technical procedures, transfusion practices and quality systems for BEs.

Through its Blood Proficiency Testing Scheme and Blood Quality Management Programme the committee helps Council of Europe member states improve their blood transfusion services, ensuring the transfer of knowledge and expertise through training and networking and the monitoring of practices in Europe. They also assess epidemiological risks, in particular those related to the emergence of new infectious agents transmissible by blood transfusion.

=== Organ, tissue and cell transplantation ===
The work of the Council of Europe in the area of organ, tissue and cell transplantation began in 1987. The guiding principles for the EDQM's activities in this area are ensuring human dignity, maintaining and fulfilling human rights and fundamental freedoms, non-commercialisation of substances of human origin and protecting donors and recipients of organs, tissues and cells. This latter principle is fulfilled by improving and promoting strict standards for quality and safety in order to protect not only the donor and recipient, but also the precious donated organ/tissue itself.

The European Committee on Organ Transplantation (CD-P-TO) is the steering committee in charge of transplantation activities). This committee consists of representatives from member states of the Council of Europe, and observers including the European Commission, WHO, the DH-BIO, Eurotransplant, Scandiatransplant, the European Society for Organ Transplantation (ESOT), The Transplantation Society (TTS), the European Association of Tissue and Cells Banks (EATCB), the European Eye Bank Association (EEBA), the European Society of Human Reproduction and Embryology (ESHRE) and the World Marrow Donor Association (WMDA). It actively promotes the non-commercialisation of donation, the fight against organ/tissue and cell trafficking and the development of ethical, quality and safety standards in the field of organ, tissue and cell transplantation. An important part of the CD-P-TO's work is the development and publication of two major guides: the "Guide to the quality and safety of organs for transplantation" and the "Guide to the quality and safety of tissues and cells for human application".

The EDQM organises a European Donation Day (EDD) together with a different member state every year, to raise awareness of the importance of organ donation and transplantation in its member states and to encourage public debate and reflection on this life-saving therapy.

=== Cosmetics and food contact materials ===
Since 1 January 2009, the EDQM has worked on strengthening consumer health protection in Europe, with a focus on the safe use and quality of cosmetics and materials and articles in contact with foodstuffs.

The European Committee on Cosmetics and Consumer Health (CD-P-COS) is tasked with responding to emerging risks for health arising from the use of cosmetics. By promoting the principles laid down in Council of Europe Resolution ResAP(2008)1 on requirements and criteria for the safety of tattoos and permanent make-up, the committee also works to ensure the safety of these products. Activities on the work programme focus on fostering collaboration between member states and observers.

The CD-P-COS oversees the European Network of Official Cosmetics Control Laboratories (OCCLs). This network was established in 2010 to maximise the efficiency of cosmetics surveillance by strengthening cross-border collaboration and pooling resources to perform Europe-wide market surveillance studies. Several control laboratories in Asia also take part.

In addition to market surveillance studies, network activities include analytical development, PTS studies and the implementation of harmonised quality management systems. Priority is given to testing products that may present a health risk for consumers, either linked to the presence of prohibited or restricted substances (according to EU legislation) or trace metals. The network also publishes test methods after performing inter-laboratory trials to confirm that these methods are fit for purpose.

The European Committee for Food Contact Materials and Articles (CD-P-MCA) is tasked with developing and strengthening harmonised measures that supplement EU and national legislation to ensure the safety of packaging, containers, utensils and other materials and articles for food contact. It is supported by two subordinate bodies: the working group on food contact materials made from paper and board and the working group on printed food contact materials. The technical guides published by the CD-P-MCA are used as reference documents by manufacturers and other business operators, safety evaluators and control laboratories.
