= Louis Siminovitch =

Canadian biologist (1920–2021)

Louis (Lou) Siminovitch
- Born: May 1, 1920; Montreal, Quebec, Canada
- Died: April 6, 2021 (aged 100); Toronto, Ontario, Canada
- Education: McGill University
- Awards: Order of Canada; Order of Ontario; Flavelle Medal (1978)
- Scientific career
- Fields: Molecular biology, genetics
- Workplaces: Ontario Cancer Institute; Hospital for Sick Children Research Institute; Samuel Lunenfeld Institute at Mount Sinai Hospital; University of Toronto
- Thesis: The Preparation of disulphur decafluoride (1944)
- Doctoral advisor: R.L. McIntosh
- Notable students: Joyce Taylor-Papadimitriou

Louis Siminovitch CC OOnt FRS FRSC (May 1, 1920 – April 6, 2021) was a Canadian molecular biologist. He was a pioneer in human genetics, researcher into the genetic basis of muscular dystrophy and cystic fibrosis, and helped establish Ontario programs exploring genetic roots of cancer.

== Life and career ==
Siminovitch was born in Montreal, Quebec, the son of Goldie and Nathan Siminovitch, who were Jewish emigrants from Eastern Europe. He won a scholarship in chemistry to McGill University, earning a doctorate in 1944. He then studied at the Pasteur Institute in Paris. In 1953 he joined Toronto's Connaught Medical Research Laboratories. Later he joined the University of Toronto and worked there from 1956 to 1985. One of his doctoral students was Joyce Taylor-Papadimitriou.

He helped establish the Department of Genetics at the Hospital for Sick Children as geneticist in chief, where he worked from 1970 to 1985. From 1983 to 1994 he was the founding director of research at the Samuel Lunenfeld Research Institute of Mount Sinai Hospital (Toronto). He was the founder and the first Chair of the Department of Molecular Genetics at the University of Toronto, then called Department of Medical Cell Biology.

He was the author or coauthor, at last count, of over 147 scientific papers, reviews, and articles in journals and books.

He married Elinore, a playwright who died in 1995. They had three daughters. The annual Elinore & Lou Siminovitch Prize in Theatre is named in his and his wife's honour.

Siminovitch died in April 2021 in Ontario at the age of 100.

== Degrees ==
- 1941 B.Sc. McGill University, Montreal, Quebec (Chemistry)
- 1944 Ph.D. McGill University, Montreal, Quebec (Chemistry)
- 1978 D.Sc. Memorial University, St. John's, Newfoundland
- 1978 D.Sc. McMaster University, Hamilton, Ontario

== Honours ==
- In 1941 he won the Anne Molson Prize in Chemistry
- In 1965 - Fellow, Royal Society of Canada (F.R.S.C.)
- In 1967 - Canadian Centennial Medal
- In 1977 - Queen Elizabeth II Silver Jubilee Medal
- In 1978 he won the Royal Society of Canada Flavelle Medal
- In 1980 he was made an Officer of the Order of Canada.
- In 1980 - Fellow, Royal Society (London) (F.R.S.)
- In 1981 he received the Gairdner Foundation Wightman Award.
- In 1981 he received the Izaac Walton Killam Memorial Prize.
- In 1988 he was promoted to Companion of the Order of Canada.
- In 1997 he was inducted into the Canadian Medical Hall of Fame.
- In 1999 he was named a foreign associate, and the only Canadian, to the National Academy of Sciences.
- In 2012, he was made a member of the Order of Ontario.
- He was awarded a Doctor of Science, Honoris Causa from several Canadian Universities including Memorial University, McMaster University, Université de Montréal, McGill University, University of Western Ontario, University of Toronto and University of Guelph.

== Selected publications ==
- Siminovitch, L., McCulloch, E.A., Till, J.E. (1963) The distribution of colony-forming cells among spleen colonies. Journal of Cellular and Comparative Physiology 62:327-36. [Link to article]
- Till, J.E., McCulloch, E.A., Siminovitch, L. (1964) A stochastic model of stem cell proliferation, based on the growth of spleen colony-forming cells. Proceedings of the National Academy of Sciences (USA) 51(1):29-36. [Link to article]
- McCulloch, E.A., Siminovitch, L., Till, J.E. (1964) Spleen-colony formation in anemic mice of genotype WWv. Science 144(1620):844-846. [Link to article]
- McCulloch, E.A., Siminovitch, L., Till, J.E., Russell, E.S., Bernstein, S.E. (1965) The cellular basis of the genetically determined hemopoietic defect in anemic mice of genotype Sl/Sld. Blood 26(4):399-410. [Link to article]
- Wu, A.M., Till, J.E., Siminovitch, L., McCulloch, E.A. (1968) Cytological evidence for a relationship between normal hematopoietic colony-forming cells and cells of the lymphoid system. J Exp Med 127(3):455-464. [Link to article]
