= Alick Isaacs =

Scottish virologist (1921–1967)

- Born: 17 July 1921; Glasgow, Scotland
- Died: 26 January 1967 (aged 45)
- Education: University of Glasgow
- Awards: Fellow of the Royal Society
- Scientific career
- Fields: Virology
- Workplaces: National Institute for Medical Research

Alick Isaacs FRS (17 July 1921 – 26 January 1967) was a Scottish virologist.

== Background and early life ==
Isaacs's Jewish paternal grandparents came from Lithuania to escape oppression, and took the surname Isaacs. Alick's father Louis was born in 1890. His parents moved to Wigan and then to the Gorbals area of Glasgow where Isaacs was born.

== Professional life ==
Isaacs earned his Doctor of Medicine degree from the University of Glasgow in 1954.

In 1957 he co-discovered interferon with Swiss virologist Jean Lindenmann. He served as the head of the Laboratory for Research on Interferon at the National Institute for Medical Research in 1964–1967. Joyce Taylor-Papadimitriou worked as an early career researcher in his laboratory.

== Awards, death and legacy ==
Isaacs was awarded honours and the Bellahouston Gold Medal for his research on the influenza virus. He was elected a Fellow of the Royal Society in 1966. He died in 1967, aged 45, of a brain haemorrhage. He was survived by his wife, Susanna Isaacs Elmhirst, a paediatric registrar, who later became a child psychiatrist. A collection of his laboratory notes is held at the National Library of Medicine in Bethesda, Maryland.
