= Marjorie Mussett =

British biologist and endocrinologist

- Born: 1922
- Died: 21 December 2004 (aged 82)
- Education: University of London
- Scientific career
- Fields: Biology, Endocrinology
- Workplaces: National Institute for Medical Research

Marjorie Violet Mussett (1922 - 21 December 2004) was a British biologist and endocrinologist.

== Career ==
She obtained a Bachelor of Science degree from the University of London in 1950.

She worked at the National Institute for Medical Research from 1951 to 1974, in Biological Standards and Statistical Services, and transferred to the National Institute for Biological Standards and Control when this was separated. Marjorie worked as a statistician and was recognised for her contribution to the statistical reliability, with many acknowledgements of her work.

She authored 48 papers, mainly on the creation of international standards for antibiotics.

At the time of her death, she was living in Blenheim Road, Harrow, Middlesex.

== Selected publications ==
- R. Depoux and Marjorie V. Mussett - "Attempts to potentiate immunity to influenza in mice" (1954)
- D. R. Bangham and Marjorie V. Mussett - "Third International Standard for Posterior Pituitary" (1958)
- J. H. Humphrey, J. W. Lightbown, and Marjorie V. Mussett - "International Standard for Phenoxymethylpenicillin" (1959)
