= Marketing authorisation =

Process of reviewing medicinal products

Marketing authorisation is the process of reviewing and assessing the evidence to support a medicinal product, such as a drug, in relation to its marketing, finalised by granting of a licence to be sold.

This process is performed within a legal framework defining the requirements necessary for successful application to the regulatory authority, details on the assessment procedure (based on quality, efficacy and safety criteria), and also the circumstances where a marketing authorisation already granted may be withdrawn, suspended or revoked.

The application dossier for marketing authorisation is called a New Drug Application (NDA) in the USA or marketing authorisation application (MAA) in the European Union and other countries, or simply registration dossier. This contains data proving that the drug has quality, efficacy and safety properties suitable for the intended use, additional administrative documents, samples of finished product or related substances and reagents necessary to perform analyses of finished product as described in that dossier. The content and format of the dossier must follow rules as defined by the regulator. For example, since 2003, the authorities in the United States, the European Union and Japan ask for the Common Technical Document (CTD) format, and more recently, its electronic version – the electronic Common Technical Document (eCTD).

The application is filed with the regulator, which can be either an independent regulatory body or a specialised department in the ministry of health.

Depending on jurisdiction, the resulting document may be more detailed (in addition to data identifying the product and its marketing authorisation holder), for example containing addresses of all manufacturing sites, appended labelling, artwork of packaging components, etc. or may be simplified to a one-page document called certificate of registration (and containing minimal data identifying the product and its source).

== Procedures for obtaining a marketing authorisation ==
Authorisation processes follow either a purely national procedure, with rules and requirements as per national legislation in force, as it occurs in most of countries worldwide, or should follow a centrally approval or a mutual recognition of decentralised procedures within the European Union.

== Types of applications ==
The type of application may vary according to status of the active ingredient.

Thus, if the application concerns a new active ingredient (new active substance, new chemical entity, new molecular entity), one talks about a full application.

Once a new active ingredient is authorised, any additional strengths, pharmaceutical forms, administration routes, presentations, as well as any variations (changes to the existing marketing authorisation) and extensions shall also be granted an authorisation or be included in the initial marketing authorisation, being subject of an abridged application.

Special consideration is to be given to application for authorisation of biological products and biotechnology products, homeopathic products, herbal drugs, radionuclide generators, kits, radionuclide precursor radiopharmaceuticals and industrially prepared radiopharmaceuticals; in such instances, requirements are specific, in the meaning that they are special, more or less detailed, as per the nature of active ingredient.

== Validity of marketing authorisations ==
In most countries, a marketing authorisation is valid for a period of 5 years. After this period, one should apply for renewal of the marketing authorisation, usually by providing minimal data proving that quality, efficacy and safety characteristics are maintained and the risk-benefit ratio of the medicinal product is still favourable. However, in the European Union, after one renewal, the marketing authorisation shall remain valid for an unlimited period, unless the competent regulatory authority decides otherwise.

If the marketing authorisation is not renewed in due time as requested by the local legislation, in order to maintain the pharmaceutical product on a market, one can apply for re-authorisation (re-registration). In such situations, the applicant may be requested to submit the whole items necessary for a full application.

Marketing authorisation may be withdrawn, suspended, revoked or varied by regulatory authorities if under normal conditions of use the benefit over risk ratio is no more favourable, the product is harmful, or if it lacks therapeutic efficacy; also, one of the above actions can be taken if the qualitative and quantitative composition or other qualitative aspects (control) are not as currently declared.

Marketing authorisation may be also withdrawn, suspended or revoked if the marketing authorisation holder or its representative does not fulfil other legal or regulatory obligations necessary to maintaining of product on the market, as per the legislation in force.

Also, the marketing authorisation is withdrawn in the EU if the product is not placed on the market within next 3 consecutive years after granting of authorisation or if it is no more marketed for 3 consecutive years (so-called “sunset clause”).
