= Data definition specification =

In computing, a data definition specification (DDS) is a guideline to ensure comprehensive and consistent data definition. It represents the attributes required to quantify data definition. A comprehensive data definition specification encompasses enterprise data, the hierarchy of data management, prescribed guidance enforcement and criteria to determine compliance.

== Overview ==
A data definition specification may be developed for any organization or specialized field, improving the quality of its products through consistency and transparency. It eliminates redundancy (since all contributing areas are referencing the same specification) and provides standardization and degrees of compliance, making it easier and more efficient to create, modify, verify, analyze and share information across the enterprise.

To understand how a data definition specification works in an enterprise, we must look at the elements of a DDS. Writing data definitions, defining business terms (or rules) in the context of a particular environment, provides structure for an organization's data architecture. In developing these definitions, the words used must be traceable to clearly defined data.

A data definition specification may be used in the following activities:

- Business intelligence
- Business process modeling
- Business rules management
- Data analysis and modeling
- Information architecture
- Metadata modeling
- Data mastering
- Report generation

== Criteria ==
A data definition specification requires data definitions to be:

- Atomic – singular, describing only one concept. Commonly used and ambiguous terms should be defined. While a term refers to one concept, several words may be used in a term:

- File – A concept identifiable with one word
- File extension – A concept identifiable with more than one word

- Traceable – Mapped to a specific data element. In business, a term may be traced to an entity (for example, a customer) or an attribute (such as a customer's name). A term may be a value in a data set (such as gender), or designate the data set itself. Traceability indicates relationships in the data hierarchy.
- Consistent - Used in a standard syntax; if used in a specific context, the context is noted
- Accurate - Precise, correct and unambiguous, stating what the term is and is not
- Clear - Readily understood by the reader
- Complete - With the term, its description and contextual references
- Concise - To avoid circular references

== Applications ==
=== Enterprise data ===
A data definition specification was produced by the Open Mobile Alliance to document charging data. The document, the centralized catalog of data elements defined for interfaces, specifies the mapping of these data elements to protocol fields in the interfaces. Created for the exchange of financial data, Market Data Definition Language (MDDL) is an XML specification designed

to enable the interchange of information necessary to account, to analyze, and to trade financial instruments of the world's markets. It defines an XML-based interchange format and common data dictionary on the fields needed to describe: (1) financial instruments, (2) corporate events affecting value and tradability, and (3) market-related, economic and industrial indicators. The principal function of MDDL is to allow entities to exchange market data by standardizing formats and definitions. MDDL provides a common format for market data so that it can be efficiently passed from one processing system to another and provides a common understanding of market data content by standardizing terminology and by normalizing the relationships of various data elements to one another ... From the user perspective, the goal of MDDL is to enable users to integrate data from multiple sources by standardizing both the input feeds used for data warehousing (i.e., define what's being provided by vendors) and the output methods by which client applications request the data (i.e., ensure compatibility on how to get data in and out of applications)."

=== Clinical submissions ===
The Clinical Data Interchange Standards Consortium, a global, multidisciplinary, non-profit organization, has established standards to support the acquisition, exchange, submission and archiving of clinical research data and metadata. CDISC standards are vendor-neutral, platform-independent and freely available from the CDISC website. The Case Report Tabulation Data Definition Specification (define.xml) draft version 2.0, the oldest data definition specification, is part of the evolution from the 1999 FDA electronic submission (eSub) guidance and electronic Common Technical Document (eCTD) documents specifying that a document describing the content and structure of included data be included in a submission. Define.xml was developed to automate the review process by generating a machine-readable data-definition document. Define.xml has standardized submissions to the Food and Drug Administration, reducing review times from over two years to several months.

=== Archival data ===
A data definition specification is the foundation of metadata for scientific data archiving. The Metadata Encoding and Transmission Standard (METS) uses one principle of a DDS: consistent use of key terms to catalog digital objects for global use. The METS schema is a flexible mechanism for encoding descriptive, administrative and structural metadata for a digital library object and expressing complex links between metadata, and can provide a useful standard for the exchange of digital-library objects between repositories.

A similar effort is underway to preserve complex data associated with video-game archiving. Preserving Virtual Worlds attempted to address archival-format deficiencies, citing the lack of suitable documentation for interactive fiction and games at the bit level: specifically, the absence of "representation information" needed to map raw bits into higher-level data constructs. Preserving Virtual Worlds 2 is a research project expanding on initial efforts in this field.

== See also ==
- Clinical Data Interchange Standards Consortium (CDISC)
- Data governance
- ISO/IEC 11179
- Metadata Encoding and Transmission Standard (METS)
- OASIS
