= Pharmaceuticals and Medical Devices Act =

Law in Japan

The Act on Securing Quality, Efficacy and Safety of Products Including Pharmaceuticals and Medical Devices (医薬品、医療機器等の品質、有効性及び安全性の確保等に関する法律 Iyaku-hin, iryō-kiki tō no hinshitsu, yūkōsei oyobi anzensei no kakuho tō ni kansuru hō ritsu) is a law regulating the manufacturing, importation, and sale of drugs, medical devices and medical softwares. Originally passed as the Pharmaceutical Affairs Act (薬事法, Yakuji Hō) in 1960, the act was renamed to its current title in 2014. It is often abbreviated as the Pharmaceuticals and Medical Devices Act (医薬品医療機器等法, Iyaku-hin Iryō-kiki tō hō), which can be further abbreviated as the PMD Act (薬機法, Yakki hō).

== Legislative history ==
The July 2002 amendment to the law changed the regulatory structure for pharmaceuticals and medical devices, in an effort to align laws more closely with those in the European Union, Australia, Canada, and the United States. The amendment shifted the focus of regulation from the point of manufacturing to the point of sale, and adopted a risk-based classification system for products.

The June 2006 amendment to the law (Law No. 69 of 2006, with effective date of June 2009), represented the first change in the sales structure of OTC drugs in 46 years. The amended law permitted stores to sell certain over-the-counter drugs without having a pharmacist on staff, opening up the market to convenience stores, supermarkets, and other such stores. 7-Eleven was the first convenience store to take advantage of the amended law, while Aeon supermarkets also began selling OTC drugs at a 20% to 40% discount to competing drug stores (including Aeon-affiliated companies). The amendment was expected to put significant competitive pressure on drug stores. However, the law continued to ban internet sales of OTC drugs, which the Ministry of Health had previously justified by stating that drug sales should only be conducted in person by pharmacists or other qualified vendors who could explain the side effects of the drugs.

On May 24, 2013, the Government Cabinet approved a revision of Pharmaceutical Affairs Law to simplify the approval process for medical devices and regenerative medicine products, the safety of regenerative medicine using iPS cells (stem cells).

According to the revised bill, medical equipment can be checked by the private organization including regenerative medicine products and validation of the post-marketing effectiveness.

== See also ==
- Pharmaceuticals and Medical Devices Agency
