= Anne O'Garra =

British immunologist

Anne O'Garra FRS FMedSci
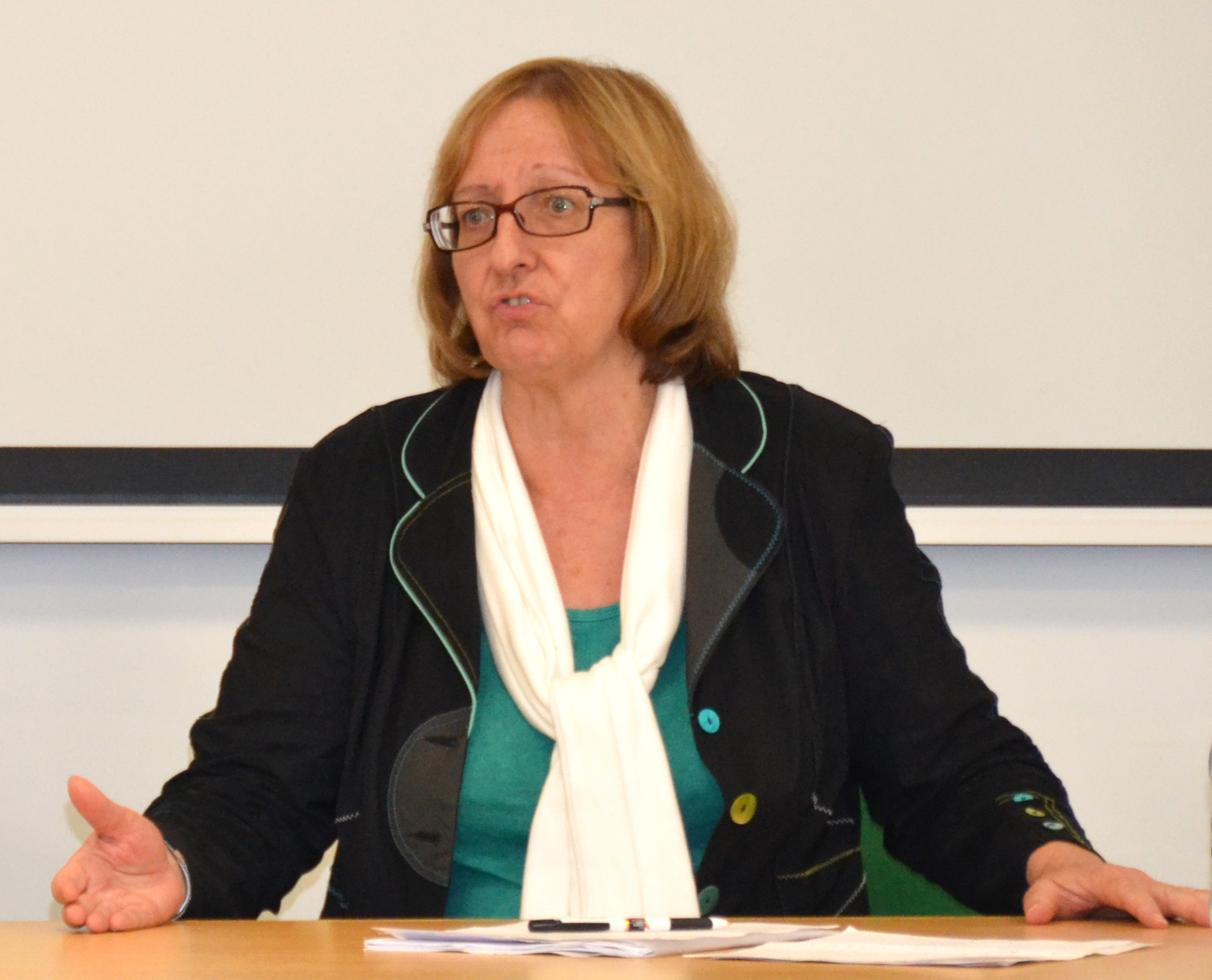
- Born: 1954 (age 71–72); Gibraltar
- Occupations: Immunologist, medical doctor
- Employer: Francis Crick Institute
- Scientific career
- Thesis: Adhesion of coagulase negative staphyloccoci to human ephithelial cells (1983)
- Website: www.crick.ac.uk/research/a-z-researchers/researchers-k-o/anne-o%E2%80%99garra/
- Website: www3.imperial.ac.uk/people/a.ogarra

Anne O'Garra (born 1954) is a British immunologist who has made important discoveries on the mechanism of action of Interleukin 10.

== Biography ==
She was born in Gibraltar to Louis O'Garra and Theresa O'Garra in 1954.

From 1977 to 1980, O'Garra studied at Chelsea College, University of London, and graduated with a B.Sc. (first class honours) in microbiology and biochemistry.

At the National Institute for Medical Research (NIMR), she earned her Ph.D. in microbiology, staying on there for a four-year post-doctorate in immunology.

In 1987, O'Garra left England for Palo Alto, California, to work for the DNAX Research Institute, where by 2000 she had become a principal staff scientist in the department of immunobiology. In 2001, she became the head of the Division of Immunoregulation at the Medical Research Council NIMR in London. Since 2015, she has been an associate research director and group leader at the Francis Crick Institute, the successor institute to the NIMR.

== Research ==
O'Garra is known for her contributions to the understanding of the intricate network of cell-cell and cytokine interactions regulating the induction and suppression of cellular immune responses. She was the first to discover the immunosuppressive functions of Interleukin-10 (IL-10), which inhibits antigen presentation by dendritic cells and macrophages and reduces their production of proinflammatory cytokines. She also discovered that dendritic cells produce the interleukin essential for activation of T-cells (IL-12) and subsequent eradication of intracellular pathogens and that IL-10 regulates this production.

== Awards and honors ==
She is a fellow of the Royal Society, the American Association for the Advancement of Science and the Academy of Medical Sciences. She is an honorary member of the British Society for Immunology. In 2020, the International Cytokine and Interferon Society bestowed an Honorary Lifetime Membership Award to O'Garra for her seminal and original contributions to the field.
