= International Council for Harmonisation of Technical Requirements for Pharmaceuticals for Human Use =

Initiative to promote public health

The International Council for Harmonisation of Technical Requirements for Pharmaceuticals for Human Use (ICH) is an initiative that brings together regulatory authorities and pharmaceutical industry to discuss scientific and technical aspects of pharmaceutical product development and registration. The mission of the ICH is to promote public health by achieving greater harmonisation through the development of technical guidelines and requirements for pharmaceutical product registration.

Harmonisation leads to a more rational use of human, animal and other resources, the elimination of unnecessary delay in the global development, and availability of new medicines while maintaining safeguards on quality, safety, efficacy, and regulatory obligations to protect public health. Junod notes in her 2005 treatise on clinical drug trials that "[a]bove all, the ICH has succeeded in aligning clinical trial requirements."

== History ==
In the 1980s, the European Union began harmonising regulatory requirements. In 1989, Europe, Japan, and the United States began creating plans for harmonisation. The International Conference on Harmonisation of Technical Requirements for Registration of Pharmaceuticals for Human Use (ICH) was created in April 1990 at a meeting in Brussels. ICH had the initial objective of coordinating the regulatory activities of the European, Japanese and American regulatory bodies in consultation with the pharmaceutical trade associations from these regions, to discuss and agree the scientific aspects arising from product registration. Since the new millennium, ICH's attention has been directed towards extending the benefits of harmonisation beyond the founding ICH regions.

In 2015, ICH underwent several reforms and changed its name to the International Council for Harmonisation of Technical Requirements for Pharmaceuticals for Human Use while becoming a legal entity in Switzerland as a non-profit association. The aim of these reforms was to transform ICH into a truly global initiative supported by a robust and transparent governance structure. The ICH association established an assembly as the over-arching governing body with the aim of focusing global pharmaceutical regulatory harmonisation work in one venue that allows pharmaceutical regulatory authorities and concerned industry organisations to be more actively involved in ICH's harmonisation work. The new assembly met for the first time on 23 October 2015.

== Structure ==
The ICH comprises the following bodies:

1. ICH Assembly
2. ICH Management Committee
3. MedDRA Management Committee
4. ICH Secretariat

The ICH assembly brings together all members and observers of the ICH association as the overarching governing body of ICH. It adopts decisions in particular on matters such as on the adoption of ICH guidelines, admission of new members and observers, and the ICH association's work plans and budget. Member representatives appointed to the assembly are supported by ICH coordinators who represent each member to the ICH secretariat on a daily basis.

The ICH Management Committee (MC) is the body that oversees operational aspects of ICH on behalf of all members, including administrative and financial matters and oversight of the working groups (WGs).

The MedDRA Management Committee (MC) is responsible for direction of MedDRA, ICH's standardised medical terminology. The MedDRA MC has the role of managing, supporting, and facilitating the maintenance, development, and dissemination of MedDRA.

The ICH secretariat is responsible for day-to-day management of ICH, coordinating ICH activities as well as providing support to the assembly, the MC and working groups. The ICH secretariat also provides support for the MedDRA MC. The ICH secretariat is located in Geneva, Switzerland.

The ICH WGs are established by the assembly when a new technical topic is accepted for harmonisation, and are charged with developing a harmonised guideline that meets the objectives outlined in the concept paper and business plan. Face-to-face meetings of the WG will normally only take place during the biannual ICH meetings. Interim reports are made at each meeting of the assembly and made publicly available on the ICH website.

== Process of Harmonisation ==
ICH harmonisation activities fall into 4 categories: Formal ICH Procedure, Q&A Procedure, Revision Procedure and Maintenance Procedure, depending on the activity to be undertaken. The development of a new harmonised guideline and its implementation (the formal ICH procedure) involves 5 steps:

=== Step 1: Consensus building ===
The WG works to prepare a consensus draft of the technical document, based on the objectives set out in the concept paper. When consensus on the draft is reached within the WG, the technical experts of the WG will sign the Step 1 Experts sign-off sheet. The Step 1 Experts' technical document is then submitted to the assembly to request adoption under Step 2 of the ICH process.

=== Step 2a: Confirmation of consensus on the technical document ===
Step 2a is reached when the assembly agrees, based on the report of the WG, that there is sufficient scientific consensus on the technical issues for the technical document to proceed to the next stage of regulatory consultation. The assembly then endorses the Step 2a technical document.

=== Step 2b: Endorsement of draft guideline by regulatory members ===
Step 2b is reached when the regulatory members of the assembly further endorse the draft guideline.

=== Step 3: Regulatory consultation and discussion ===
Step 3 occurs in three distinct stages: regulatory consultation, discussion, and finalisation of the Step 3 expert draft guideline.

- Stage I - Regional regulatory consultation: The guideline embodying the scientific consensus leaves the ICH process and becomes the subject of normal wide-ranging regulatory consultation in the ICH regions. Regulatory authorities and industry associations in other regions may also comment on the draft consultation documents by providing their comments to the ICH Secretariat.
- Stage II - Discussion of regional consultation comments: After obtaining all comments from the consultation process, the EWG works to address the comments received and reach consensus on what is called the Step 3 experts draft guideline.
- Stage III - Finalisation of Step 3 experts draft guideline: If, after due consideration of the consultation results by the WG, consensus is reached amongst the experts on a revised version of the Step 2b draft guideline, the Step 3 expert draft guideline is signed by the experts of the ICH regulatory members. The Step 3 expert draft guideline with regulatory EWG signatures is submitted to the regulatory members of the assembly to request adoption at Step 4 of the ICH process.

=== Step 4: Adoption of an ICH harmonised guideline ===
Step 4 is reached when the regulatory members of the assembly agree that there is sufficient scientific consensus on the draft guideline and adopt the ICH harmonised guideline.

=== Step 5: Implementation ===
The ICH harmonised guideline moves immediately to the final step of the process that is the regulatory implementation. This step is carried out according to the same national or regional procedures that apply to other regional regulatory guidelines and requirements in the ICH regions.

Information on the regulatory action taken and implementation dates are reported back to the assembly and published by the ICH secretariat on the ICH website.

== Work products ==
=== Guidelines ===
The ICH topics are divided into four categories and ICH topic codes are assigned according to these categories:

- Q: Quality Guidelines
- S: Safety Guidelines
- E: Efficacy Guidelines
- M: Multidisciplinary Guidelines

ICH guidelines are not binding, and instead implemented by regulatory members through national and regional governance.

=== MedDRA ===
MedDRA is a rich and highly specific standardised medical terminology developed by ICH to facilitate sharing of regulatory information internationally for medical products used by humans. It is used for registration, documentation and safety monitoring of medical products both before and after a product has been authorised for sale. Products covered by the scope of MedDRA include pharmaceuticals, vaccines and drug-device combination products.

== See also ==
- Brazilian Health Regulatory Agency
- Australia New Zealand Therapeutic Products Authority
- Biotechnology Innovation Organization
- Clinical study report
- Clinical trial
- Common Technical Document
- Council for International Organizations of Medical Sciences
- European Federation of Pharmaceutical Industries and Associations
- Food and Drug Administration, US
- Good clinical practice (GCP)
- Health Canada
- HSA, Singapore
- International Federation of Pharmaceutical Manufacturers & Associations
- International Pharmaceutical Federation
- Japan Pharmaceutical Manufacturers Association
- Ministry of Food and Drug Safety, Republic of Korea
- Ministry of Health, Labour and Welfare, Japan
- National pharmaceuticals policy
- Pharmaceutical policy
- Pharmacopoeia
- Pharmaceutical Research and Manufacturers of America
- Pharmaceuticals and Medical Devices Agency, Japan
- Regulation of therapeutic goods
- Swissmedic, Switzerland
- Food and Drug Administration (Taiwan)
- Uppsala Monitoring Centre
