= Janet Niven =

British pathologist (1902–1974)

- Born: 20 August 1902
- Died: 15 July 1974 (aged 71)
- Education: University of Glasgow
- Awards: Brunton Memorial Prize

Janet Simpson Ferguson Niven FCPath, (20 August 1902 – 15 July 1974) was a British histologist and pathologist.

Janet Niven graduated from the University of Glasgow with a first class Bachelor of Medicine and Surgery degree in 1925. She was the first woman to win the Brunton Memorial Prize, awarded to the most distinguished medical graduate each year. During her time working at the University of Glasgow, she was awarded the Faulds Research Fellowship (1924–1928), the McCunn Scholarship (1928–1940), and the Carnegie Research Fellowship (1940–1942). In 1932, she was awarded an MD for her research on tissue culture and became a lecturer in the Pathology Department (1932–1946), as well as working as an assistant pathologist at the Western Infirmary. In 1967, she was awarded an honorary LL.D by the University of Glasgow, traditionally awarded for a portfolio of advanced research.

During the Second World War, Niven joined the Royal Army Medical Corps as a pathologist and rose to the rank of Major. Her work included the preparation of viruses to study common diseases and vaccines against scrub fever for the soldiers.

In 1947, she moved to the MRC National Institute for Medical Research (NIMR), first working in the Division of Bacteriology and Virus Research and then becoming Head of the Laboratory of Cytopathology. She is known for her contribution to the development of safety testing procedures for polio vaccines used in the United Kingdom. She published many research papers on the host response to microbial and virus infections, on the recognition and characterisation of particular animal and human pathogens, and on the development and exploitation of fluorescence microscopy for the study of cellular and viral nucleic acids. She retired from NIMR in 1967, and her obituary called her 'a world authority on certain aspects of virus diseases'.

== Sources ==
- Janet Simpson Ferguson Niven (1974). Lancet 2 (7877):416-417.
