= National Institute for Medical Research =

Medical research institute in London, United Kingdom

Coordinates: 51.6175°N 0.2198°W

National Institute For Medical Research

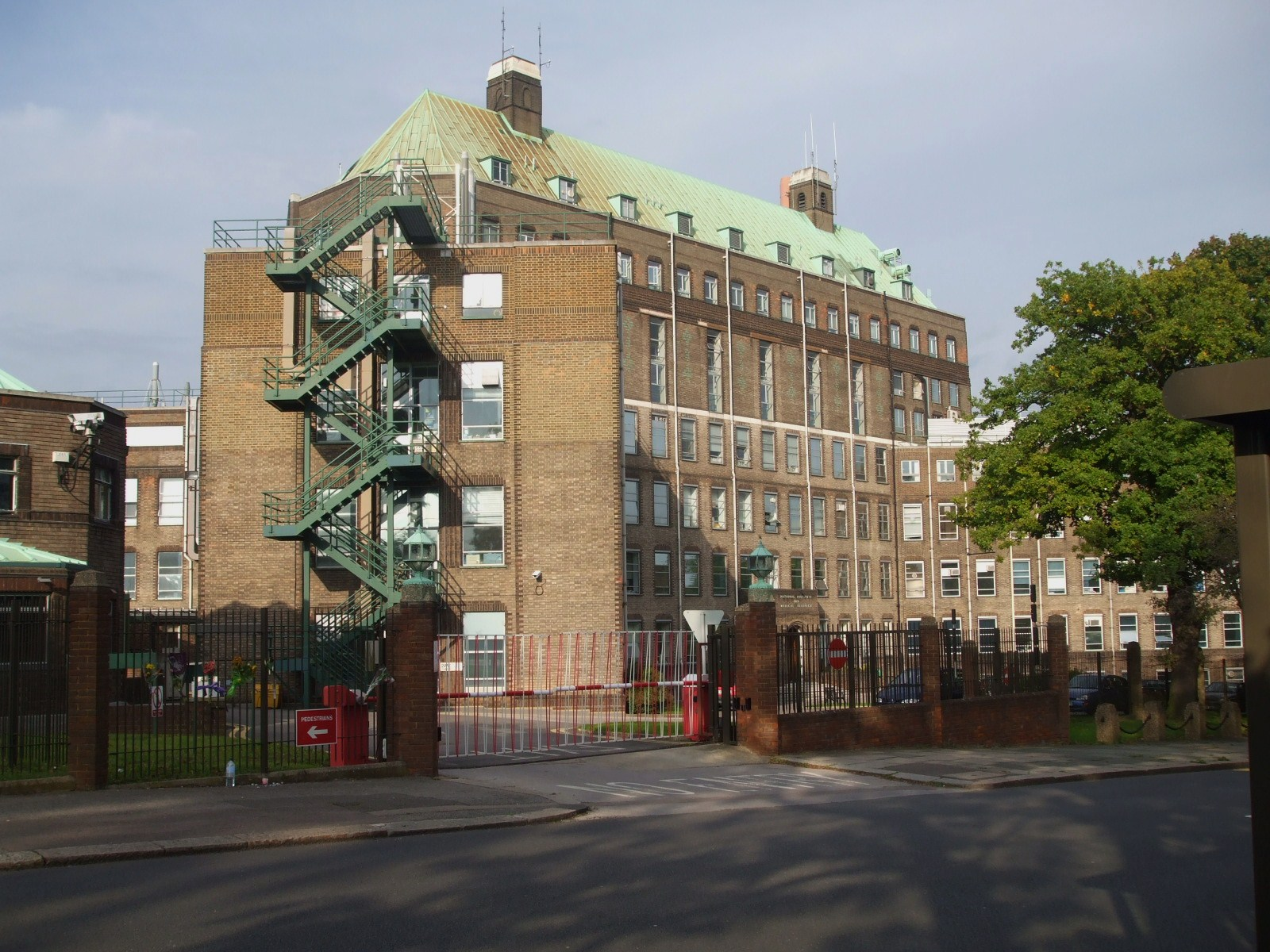
- The main building of the National Institute for Medical Research
- Abbreviation: NIMR
- Merged into: The Francis Crick Institute
- Formation: 1913
- Dissolved: 1 April 2015
- Legal status: Government agency
- Purpose: Biological research
- Location: The Ridgeway, Mill Hill, London, United Kingdom
- Region served: United Kingdom
- Members: 240 scientists
- Director: Prof Jim Smith
- Parent organization: Medical Research Council (MRC)
- Affiliations: BBSRC, WHO, NHS, Dstl
- Website: Archived

The National Institute for Medical Research (NIMR), was a medical research institute based in Mill Hill, on the outskirts of north London, England. It was funded by the Medical Research Council (MRC).

In 2016, the NIMR became part of the new Francis Crick Institute, which was constructed next to St Pancras railway station in the Camden area of central London.

== History ==
=== Foundation ===
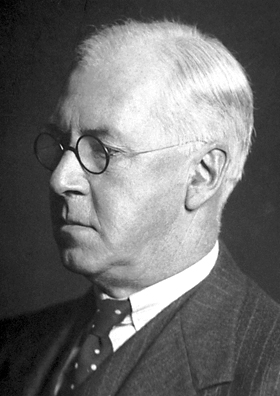
Henry Hallett Dale

The Medical Research Committee was set up in 1913 under the 1911 National Insurance Act. In 1914 it acquired premises for its research on the site of the Mount Vernon Hospital, in Hampstead, London. The outbreak of World War I set back plans for its conversion into a research institute, and it became first the Hampstead Military Hospital and later the Central Hospital for Flying Officers. In 1920, it became the National Institute for Medical Research, which remained there until it moved to Mill Hill in 1950.

The original institute, under the directorship of Sir Henry Dale, had three divisions:

- Bacteriology
- Biochemistry and Pharmacology
- Applied Physiology

Dale oversaw a period of considerable success at NIMR, including the discovery of the human influenza virus in 1933, and the discovery of the neurotransmitter acetylcholine, for which Dale himself received the 1936 Nobel Prize in Physiology or Medicine.

=== Moving to Mill Hill ===
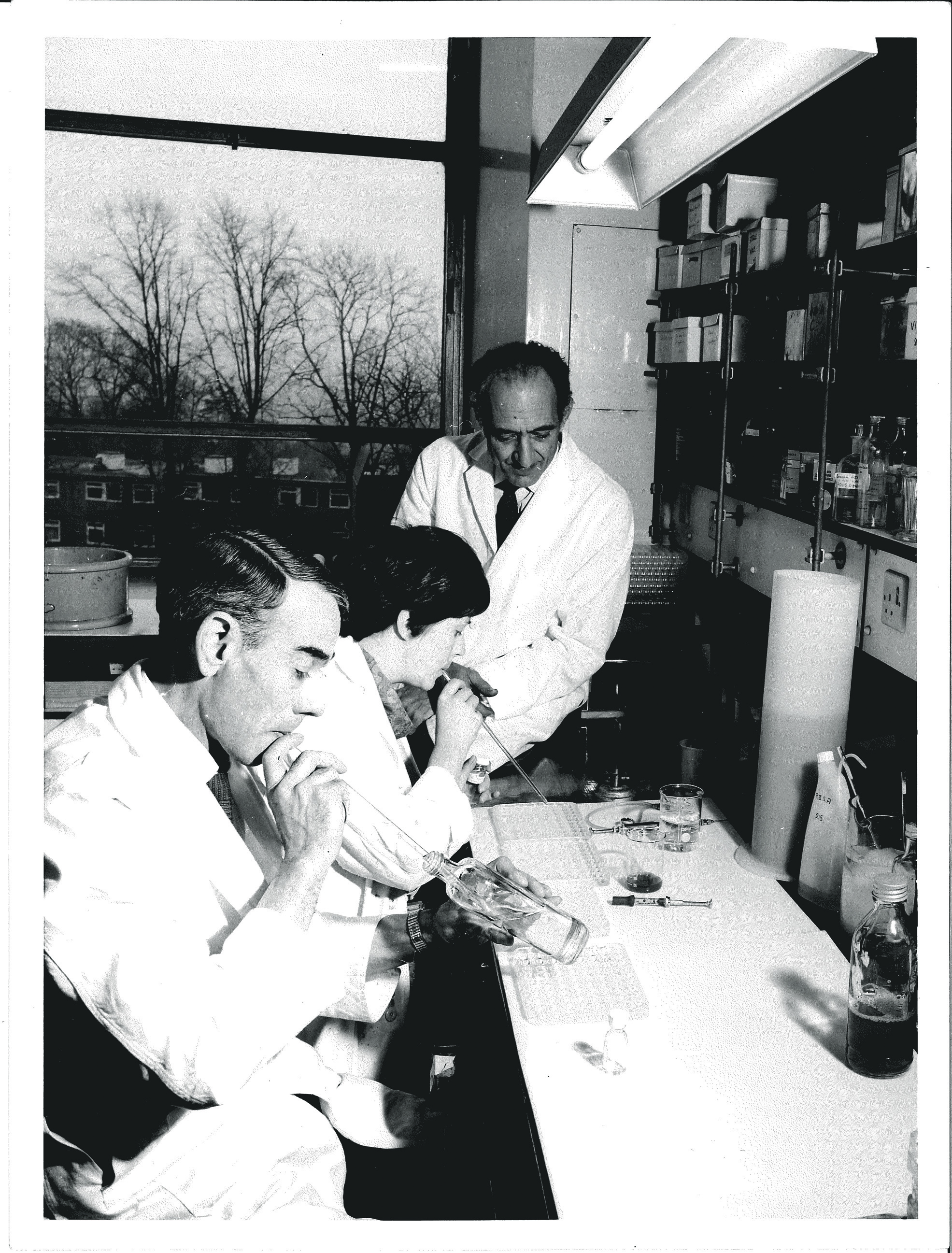
Helio Pereira, the then-Director of the World Influenza Centre at NIMR Mill Hill, oversees flu virus research

In 1937 construction began on new premises for the NIMR at Mill Hill, north London. The main building was designed by Maxwell Ayrton, architect of the original Wembley Stadium. Use of the building was delayed by the outbreak of World War Two, and the building was used by the Women's Royal Naval Service instead. The building was returned to the NIMR towards the end of 1949, and was officially opened on 5 May 1950 by King George VI.

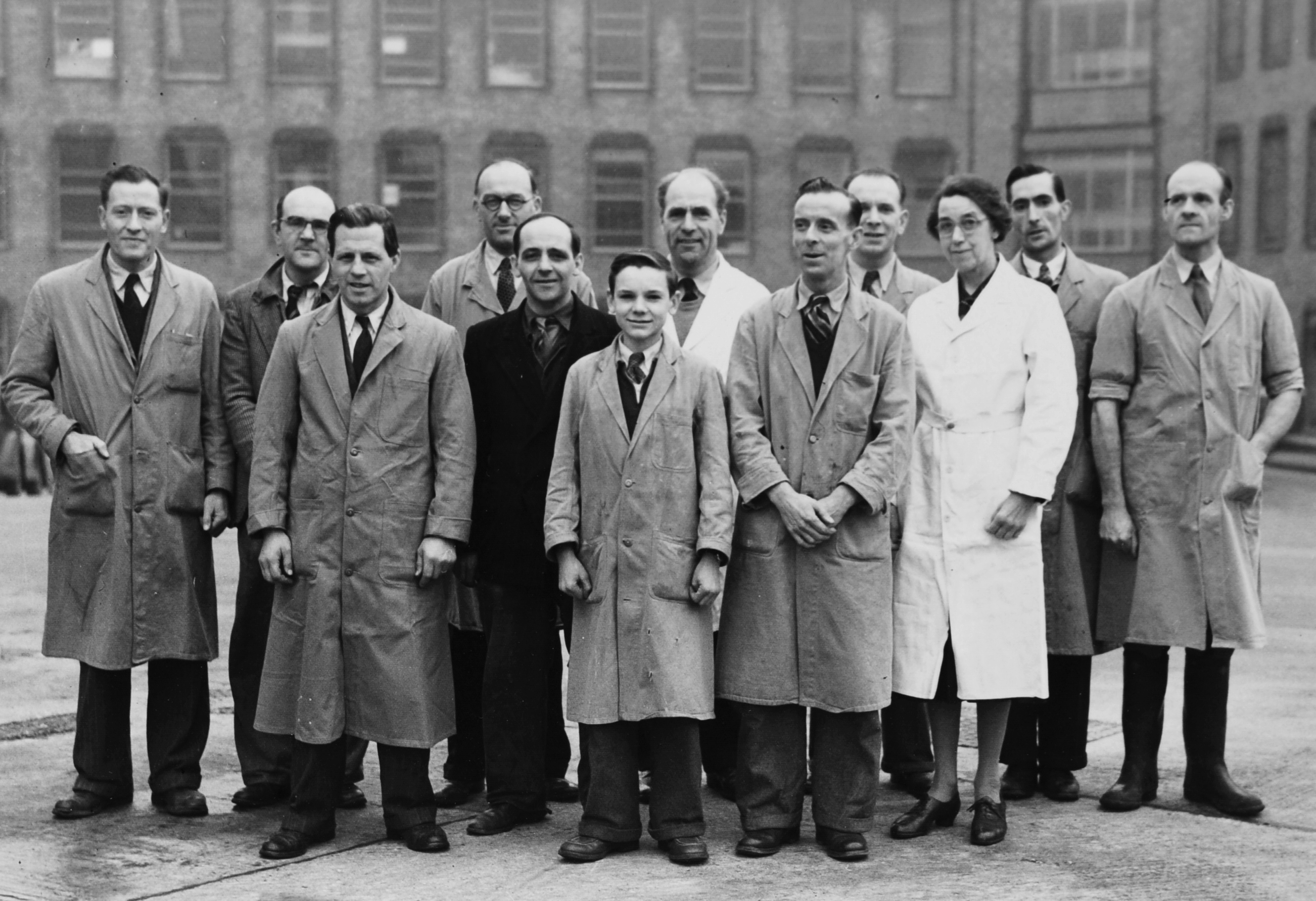
NIMR lab technicians in 1950

Sir Henry Dale had retired in 1942 and was succeeded by Sir Charles Harington as the new director from 1942 to 1962. Harington expanded the research programme into ten divisions during his 20-year tenure, and guided researchers at the institute to, amongst other achievements, the development of gas chromatography and the discovery of interferon. From 1950 to 1954 Albert Neuberger was Head of Biochemistry at the institute.

In 1962, Nobel Prize winner Sir Peter Medawar became director and, consistent with his research interests, established NIMR as a major centre for immunological research. Following an illness, Medawar retired as director in 1971 to be replaced by Sir Arnold Burgen. Burgen had an interest in nuclear magnetic resonance techniques and formed the MRC Biomedical NMR Centre at the institute in 1980. Sir Dai Rees became director in 1982 to be replaced by Sir John Skehel in 1987.

=== 2000 to 2015 ===
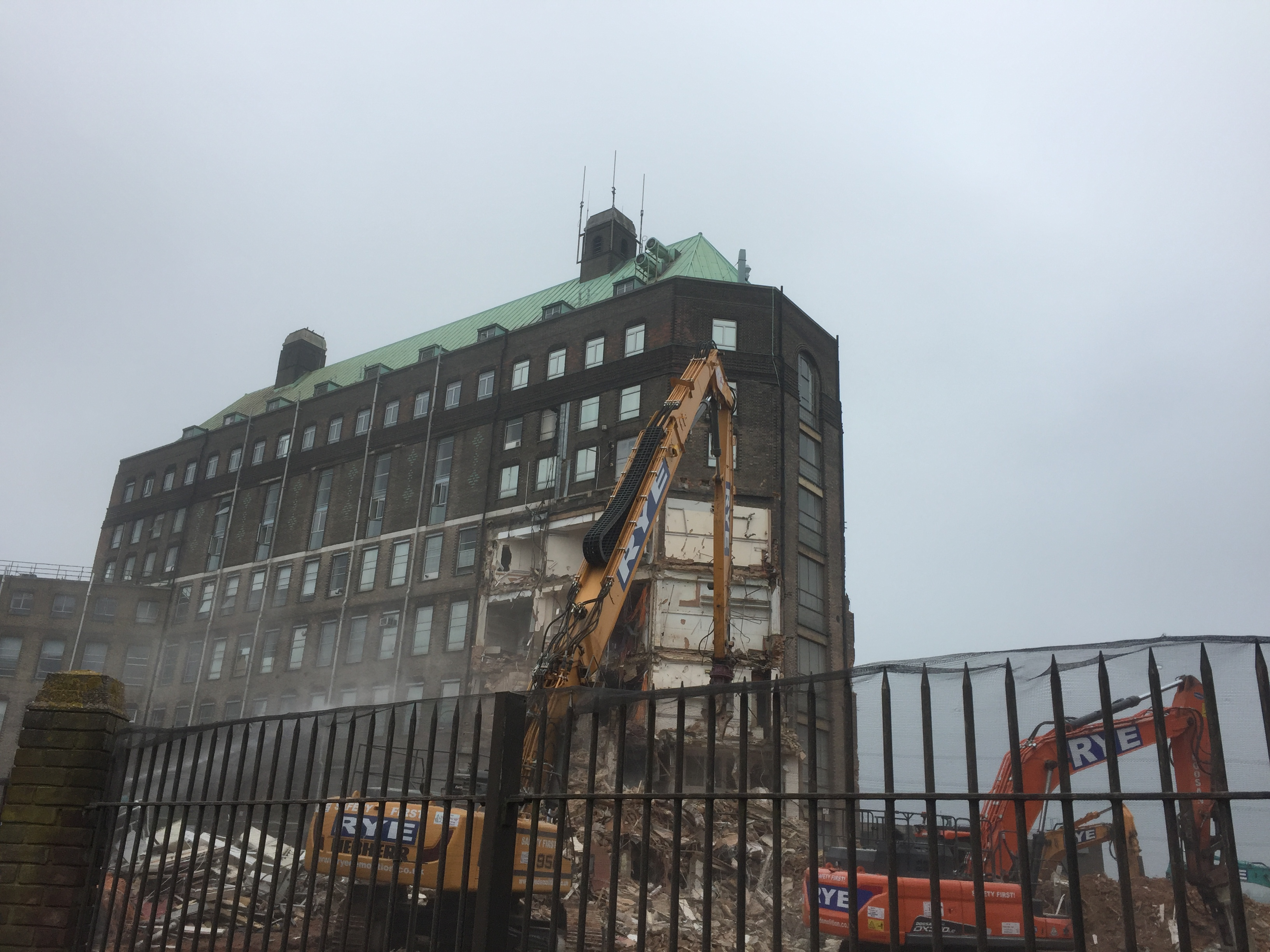
Demolition began in April 2018

In 2003, as part of their Forward Investment Strategy, the MRC announced plans to consider moving NIMR from its location in Mill Hill to a university/medical school site, to enhance its ability "to translate its biomedical research into practical health outcomes." University College London was selected as a preferred partner institution, and a nearby site in central London was acquired.

Some staff at the NIMR, including Robin Lovell-Badge and Skehel, expressed opposition to a move. In response to accusations of "coercion" during the review process, a House of Commons select committee investigation criticised both the MRC for losing the confidence of NIMR workers, and unnamed NIMR staff for "undermining [Colin] Blakemore's position as MRC chief executive."

In September 2006, Skehel retired as NIMR director and Sir Keith Peters became acting director until the future structure of the new institute could be finalised. In July of that year the MRC announced that Scott Fraser of the California Institute of Technology had been invited to take over the directorship. According to Blakemore, negotiations were ongoing as of December 2006. However, finally, in October 2008, Jim Smith of the Gurdon Institute, University of Cambridge (who worked at the NIMR from 1984 to 2000), accepted the directorship, with effect from January 2009.

=== Move to Francis Crick Institute ===
On 1 April 2015, the NIMR became part of the new Francis Crick Institute and ceased to exist as a separate MRC institute. The site at Mill Hill was fully vacated and closed for redevelopment during 2017.

In 2018 demolition of the building began, to make way for new homes.

== Activities ==
=== Mill Hill Essays ===
A yearly collection of essays was produced by guest authors and staff at the institute, under the title Mill Hill Essays. They are written to be accessible and informative to the lay reader.

== Notable staff ==
- Gordon Ada AO FAA (1922–2012), Australian biochemist
- Rudolf K. Allemann, Swiss biological chemist
- Brigitte Askonas FMedSci FRS, (1923–2013), immunologist
- Brigid Balfour (1914–1994), immunologist
- Rosa Beddington FRS (1956–2001), developmental biologist
- Hilda Bruce (1903–1974), zoologist, discoverer of the Bruce effect
- Sir Christopher Andrewes FRS (1896-1988), a virologist who discovered the human influenza A virus, appointed head of NIMR's Division of Bacteriology and Virus Research in 1939, set up the Common Cold Unit, Member of the United States National Academy of Sciences, former Deputy Head of the NIMR.
- Sir Frank Macfarlane Burnet OM AK KBE FRSNZ (1899–1985), Australian virologist and immunologist, 1960 Nobel Prize for predicting acquired immune tolerance
- G. Marius Clore FRS (born 1955) – Pioneer of multidimensional macromolecular NMR spectroscopy laying foundations of 3D structure determination of proteins in solution, and discovery of rare, invisible conformational states of macromolecules. Member of the United States National Academy of Sciences.
- Sir Henry Hallett Dale OM GBE PRS, pharmacologist and physiologist and 1936 Nobel Prize in Physiology or Medicine
- Ruth Deanesly (1901-1997) biologist
- Guy Dodson FRS FMedSci (1937–2012), biochemist
- Florence Margaret Durham (1869–1948), geneticist
- Sir David Evans FRS (1909–1984), microbiologist
- Wilhelm Feldberg CBE FRS (1900–1993), German-British physiologist and biologist
- Sir Charles Robert Harington FRS (1897–1972), chemist, best known for synthesizing thyroxine
- Cecil Hoare FRS (1892–1984), British protozoologist and parasitologist
- Brigid Hogan FRS, developmental biologist
- Alick Isaacs FRS (1921–1967), virologist, best known for his co-discovery of interferon at the National Institute in 1957
- Charles Kellaway MC FRS (1889–1952), Australian medical researcher and science administrator
- Jean Lindenmann (1924–2015), Swiss virologist, co-discovered interferon in 1957 with Dr. Alick Isaacs at the National Institute for Medical Research
- Mary C. Lobban (1922–1982), physiologist who studied circadian rhythms
- Robin Lovell-Badge FRS, geneticist most noted for his discovery of the SRY gene in mammals
- Archer John Porter Martin FRS (1910–2002), chemist, 1952 Nobel Prize in Chemistry for the invention of partition chromatography
- Dame Anne McLaren DBE FRS FRCOG (1927–2007), developmental biologist
- Sir Peter Medawar OM CBE FRS (1915–1987), biologist, 1960 Nobel Prize in Physiology or Medicine with Sir Frank Macfarlane Burnet
- Marjorie Mussett (1922–2004), biologist and endocrinologist
- Indira Nath (born 1938), Indian immunologist
- Albert Neuberger CBE FRS FRCP (1908–1996) pathologist
- Janet Niven (1902–1974), histologist and pathologist
- Anne O'Garra FRS, immunologist
- Dame Bridget Ogilvie AC DBE FRS (1938-2026), Australian-British scientist who worked across parasitology, immunology, tropical medicine and public engagement
- Delphine Parrott (born 1928), endocrinologist and immunologist
- Hélio Gelli Pereira FRS (1918-1994), virologist
- Rosalind Pitt-Rivers FRS (1907–1990), biochemist
- Christopher Polge CBE FRS (1926–2006), biologist, most noted for his work in cryopreservation
- Rodney Robert Porter FRS (1917–1985), biochemist and Nobel Laureate
- Elizabeth Press (1920–2008), immunologist
- Sir John Skehel FRS (born 1941) virologist
- Audrey Smith (1915–1981), cryobiologist
- Geoffrey L. Smith FRS FMedSci (born 1955), virologist
- Jonathan P. Stoye, virologist
- Dame Janet Thornton DBE FRS (born 1949), Director of the European Bioinformatics Institute
- Anne Warner FRS, biologist

== See also ==
- National Institute for Biological Standards and Control
