= Jean Lindenmann =

Swiss virologist and immunologist

- Born: 18 September 1924; Zagreb, Kingdom of Yugoslavia
- Died: 15 January 2015 (aged 90); Zurich, Switzerland
- Spouse: Ellen Buechler (1957–2007)
- Scientific career
- Fields: Virology
- Workplaces: National Institute for Medical Research; University of Zurich

Jean Lindenmann (18 September 1924 – 15 January 2015) was a Swiss virologist and immunologist. Lindenmann, together with his colleague, the British virologist Alick Isaacs, co-discovered and identified interferon in 1957 through their research at the National Institute for Medical Research. Interferon, a group of proteins involved in immune regulation and defence against viruses, is now used to treat a variety of conditions, including hepatitis C, multiple sclerosis, and some cancers.

== Early life and education ==
Lindenmann was born on 18 September 1924 in Zagreb, Yugoslavia (present-day Croatia), to a Swiss father and a French mother from Paris. The family moved from Yugoslavia to Zurich, Switzerland when Lindenmann was a few years old. His medical degree was from Zurich in 1951; he did postgraduate research at the Institute of Hygiene of the University of Zurich. He served in the Swiss Armed Forces.

== Career ==
Lindenmann gained a fellowship from the Swiss Academy of Medical Sciences to do postdoctoral research at the National Institute for Medical Research (NIMR) in London, UK (1956–57), where he worked with Alick Isaacs. Lindenmann returned to the Institute of Hygiene in 1957, and spent most of the remainder of his career at the University of Zurich, retiring in 1992. He also held a position at the Federal Office of Public Health, Bern (1960–62), as well as a visiting professorship at the University of Florida, Gainesville, USA, where he worked with George Gifford.

== Interferon research ==
While working together at the NIMR, Lindenmann and Isaacs noticed that if they killed viruses using heat and applied the dead viruses to living cells, those cells became resistant to further infections from live viruses. In 1957, Lindenmann and Isaacs discovered that the cells exposed to the dead viruses secreted a previously unknown substance which blocked future viral infections, which became known as interferon. It was later found that interferons are too toxic for use as general antiviral drugs, but they are used to treat hepatitis C as well as some types of cancer.

Lindenmann later returned to the University of Zurich to conduct further research on interferon and its potential uses. With Otto Haller and others, he studied why Mx^{+} laboratory mice were resistant to influenza, while Mx^{–} mice died from the virus. Lindenmann discovered that interferons acted indirectly to protect resistant mice by switching on a gene which produces a particular protein to defend against influenza.

The Journal of Interferon Research published a special edition dedicated to Lindenmann in October 1987 to mark the 30th anniversary of the discovery of interferon. In the commemorative issue, the journal's then editor-in-chief, Charles Weissmann, wrote of Lindenmann, "Not many scientists have the satisfaction of laying the foundations for a new field of research, and not only living to see its successful evolution but also contributing significantly, time and again, to its development."

== Personal life ==
Lindenmann married Ellen Buechler in 1957; she died in 2007. The couple had two sons. Lindenmann died from prostate cancer at a hospice in Zurich, Switzerland, on 15 January 2015, at the age of 90.

== Key papers ==
- Isaacs A, Lindenmann J. (1957) Virus interference. I. The interferon. Proceedings of the Royal Society Series B: Biological Sciences 147: 258–67
- Isaacs A, Lindenmann J, Valentine RC. (1957) Virus interference. II. Some properties of interferon. Proceedings of the Royal Society Series B: Biological Sciences 147: 268–73
- Staeheli P, Haller O, Boll W, Lindenmann J, Weissmann C. (1986) Mx protein: constitutive expression in 3T3 cells transformed with cloned Mx cDNA confers selective resistance to influenza virus. Cell 44: 147–58
