= Stability testing (pharmaceutical) =

Type of quality control test for drugs

In pharmaceutical industry, stability testing is a process that is used to determine the quality of a drug substance or drug product over a period of specified time under specific environmental conditions.

With stability testing, pharmaceutical industry inspects the quality of drug substances and drug products as per the guidelines outlined by US Food and Drug Administration and International Council for Harmonisation of Technical Requirements for Pharmaceuticals for Human Use to make sure that they retained the quality over the period of time. Stability testing depends upon the environmental factors like, light source, humidity and ambient temperature as well as the physical and chemical properties of the active drug product.
