= Common Technical Document =

Internationally agreed format for drug approvals

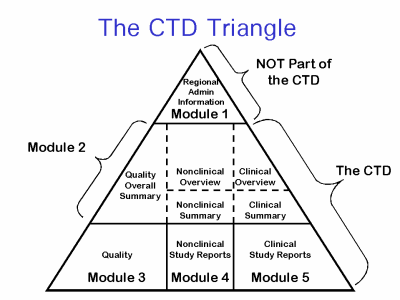

The Common Technical Document (CTD) is a set of specifications for an application dossier for the registration of medicine, designed for use across Europe, Japan, the United States, and beyond.

== Major Synopsis ==
The CTD is an internationally agreed format for the preparation of applications regarding new drugs intended to be submitted to regional regulatory authorities in participating countries. It was developed by the European Medicines Agency (EMA, Europe), the Food and Drug Administration (USA) and the Ministry of Health, Labour and Welfare (Japan) starting at World Health Organization International Conference of Drug Regulatory Authorities (ICDRA) at Paris in 1989.

The CTD is maintained by the International Council on Harmonisation of Technical Requirements for Registration of Pharmaceuticals for Human Use (ICH).

After the United States, European Union and Japan, the CTD was adopted by several other countries including Canada and Switzerland.

Paper CTDs are destined for replacement by their electronic counterparts, the eCTDs.

== Contents ==
The Common Technical Document is divided into five modules:

1. Administrative and prescribing information
2. Overview and summary of modules 3 to 5
3. Quality (pharmaceutical documentation)
4. Preclinical (pharmacology/toxicology)
5. Clinical – efficacy and safety (clinical trials)

Detailed subheadings for each module are specified for all jurisdictions. The contents of Module 1 and certain subheadings of others differ based on national requirements. However, investigational new drugs meant for emergency use or treatment applications and not for commercial distribution are not subject to the CTD requirements.

== See also ==
- Clinical Data Interchange Standards Consortium
- Clinical trial
- eCTD
- Harmonization in clinical trials
