= Clinical study report =

Document providing much detail about the methods and results of a trial

In medicine, a clinical study report (CSR) on a clinical trial is a document, typically very long, providing much detail about the methods and results of a trial. A CSR is a scientific document addressing efficacy and safety, not a sales or marketing tool; its content is similar to that of a peer-reviewed academic paper. Results of trials are usually reported in a briefer academic journal paper, but methodological flaws are often glossed over in the briefer paper.

The International Conference on Harmonisation of Technical Requirements for Registration of Pharmaceuticals for Human Use (ICH) is a body bringing together the regulatory authorities and pharmaceutical industry of Europe, Japan and the US to discuss scientific and technical aspects of drug registration; in 1995 it produced a tripartite harmonised ICH guideline on the format and content of a study report to be acceptable in all three ICH regions. Recommended prerequisites and content for producing a report conformant to ICH guidelines have been outlined by SE Caldwell. In the Nov 9, 2016 addendum to the ICH guidelines Canada and Switzerland were added to the countries which would accept the unified standard.
