= Australia New Zealand Therapeutic Products Authority =

The Australia New Zealand Therapeutic Products Authority (ANZTPA) is a proposed authority which if adopted in both Australia and New Zealand will be the sole authority which regulates therapeutic goods in both countries. The authority will replace the Therapeutic Goods Administration in Australia and Medsafe in New Zealand.

It has been proposed that the ANZTPA regulate:

- Complementary medicines;
- Over-the-counter medicines;
- Prescription medicines;
- Medical devices;
- Blood & blood products;
- Tissues;
- Cellular therapies.

The establishment of the joint authority was postponed by the New Zealand government on 16 July 2007 until such time as there is agreement in the New Zealand parliament to resume the establishment process. The Australian government was informed and agreed to the postponement. But despite completing its first harmonization activity in 2014, Australian and New Zealand officials have now decided to end the ANZTPA effort, saying a "comprehensive review of progress and [an] assessment of the costs and benefits to each country" had concluded the effort was no longer worth pursuing.

"While work on ANZTPA will cease, our two countries will continue to co-operate on the regulation of therapeutic products where there are mutual benefits for consumers, businesses and regulators in each country," the two countries said in a joint statement.
