= Health Protection Agency =

Former UK government agency (2004–2013)

Coordinates: 51.5940°N 0.2538°W

Agency overview
- Formed: 2003
- Preceding agencies: Public Health Laboratory Service; Microbiological Research Authority; National Focus for Chemical Incidents; National Radiological Protection Board (2005); National Institute for Biological Standards and Control (2009)
- Dissolved: 2013
- Superseding agencies: Public Health England (2013–2021); UK Health Security Agency (2021–Present)
- Jurisdiction: England
- Headquarters: London SW1
- Employees: 3,155 (2,831 at HPA and 324 NRPB)
- Annual budget: £244.7 million (2008–2009)
- Minister responsible: Secretary of State for Health
- Parent agency: Department of Health
- Website: www.hpa.org.uk

The Health Protection Agency (HPA) was a non-departmental public body in England. It was set up by the UK government in 2003 to protect the public from threats to their health from infectious diseases and environmental hazards.

The HPA's role was to provide an integrated approach to protecting public health in the UK. It did this by providing advice and information to the general public, health professionals and local government, and by providing emergency services, support and advice to the National Health Service (NHS) and the Department of Health. The HPA also played a lead role in helping prepare for new and emerging health threats, such as bioterrorism or emerging virulent disease strains.

There were four HPA centres – at Porton Down in Salisbury, Chilton in Oxfordshire, South Mimms in Hertfordshire, and Colindale in NW London. In addition, the HPA had regional laboratories across England and administrative headquarters in Central London. On 1 April 2013, the HPA minus the South Mimms site became part of Public Health England, a new executive agency of the Department of Health (DoH). The National Institute for Biological Standards and Control (NIBSC) located in South Mimms was merged with the Medicines and Healthcare products Regulatory Agency (MHRA).

== History ==
The Health Protection Agency (HPA) was originally established as an NHS special health authority in 2003. On 1 April 2005, the Agency became a non-departmental public body, with the National Radiological Protection Board (NRPB) being merged into the organisation at the same time.

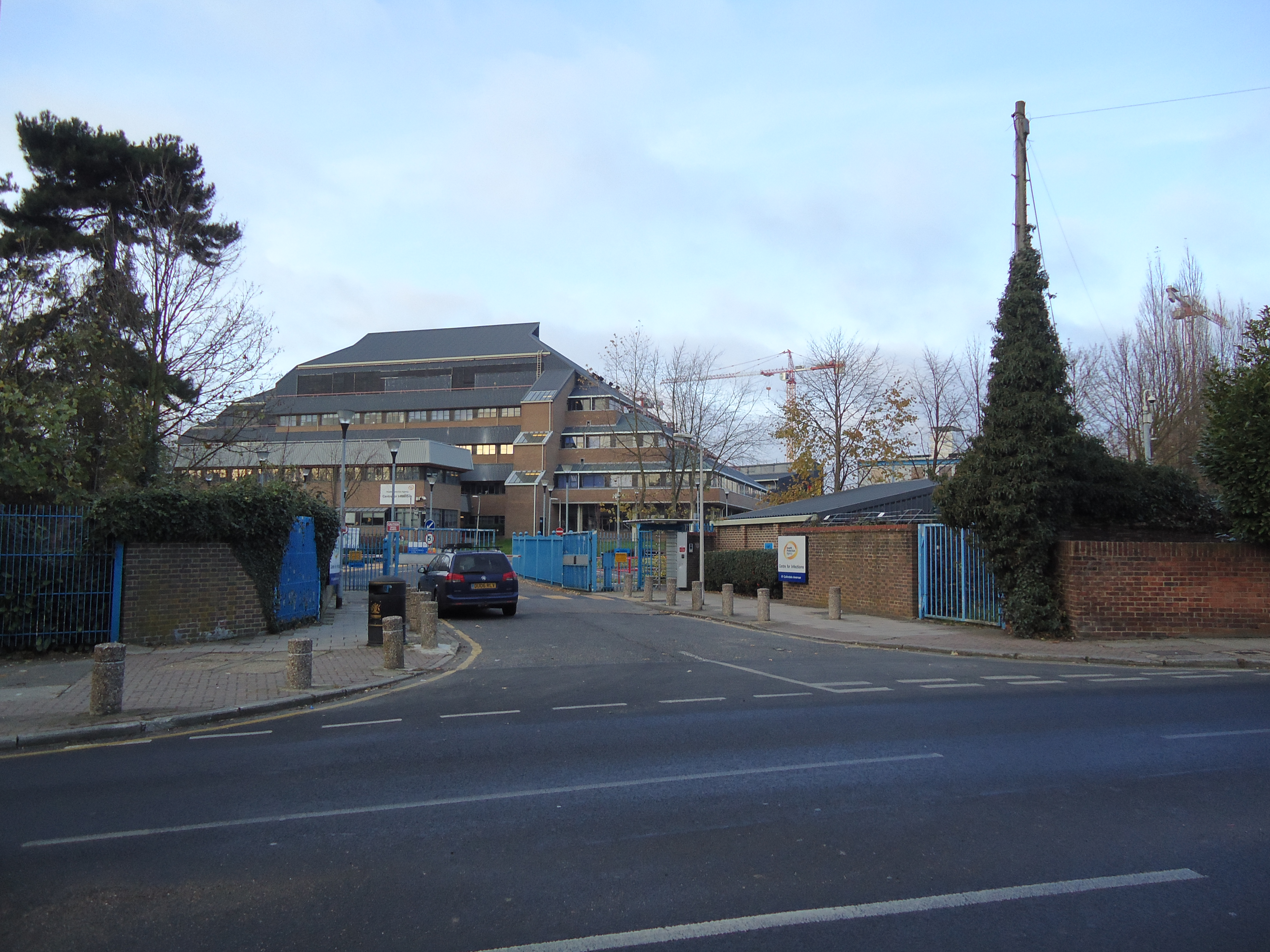
Main entrance of the HPA Colindale HQ

The origins of the HPA's largest facility in Porton Down can be traced back to 1940, when Porton had a highly secret and independent 'Biology Department' under the Ministry of Defence to study biological warfare and defence against it. By 1946 it was called the 'Microbiological Research Department', and from 1951 the 'Microbiological Research Establishment', with research becoming increasingly defensive and civilian in nature. Total civilian control was established by moving biological defence work to the Chemical Defence Establishment (now dstl), and renaming the facility from 1 April 1979 as the Centre for Applied Microbiology and Research (CAMR) within the Public Health Laboratory Service (PHLS). In April 1994, CAMR moved from PHLS centre to the Microbiological Research Authority (MRA), reporting to the Department of Health and continuing the programme in civil microbiological research started in 1979.

Microbiology Services remained the biggest of the four Divisions within the HPA with 1800 staff, consisting of laboratory groups from the Centre for Emergency Preparedness and Response, the Centre for Infections, eight regional microbiology laboratories and 37 collaborating hospital laboratories. Together, these laboratories provided frontline diagnostic and public health microbiology services to NHS trusts and HPA health protection units. Its remit included infectious disease surveillance, providing specialist and reference microbiology and microbial epidemiology, coordinating the investigation and cause of national and uncommon outbreaks, helping advise government on the risks posed by various infections and responding to international health alerts. In addition, both basic and applied research was undertaken to understand infectious diseases, and the group manufactured a number of healthcare products including vaccines and therapeutics. For instance, the HPA was the sole licensed manufacturer of anthrax vaccine in the UK.

== After dissolution ==
On 1 April 2013, the Health Protection Agency was merged into Public Health England (PHE), an executive agency of the Department of Health.

In August 2020, the UK Government announced that PHE would be replaced by a new organisation, the UK Health Security Agency (UKHSA), which formally launched on 1 April 2021. The health improvement functions of PHE were transferred to the Office for Health Improvement and Disparities (OHID), also within the Department of Health and Social Care.

== Funding ==
HPA was accountable to the UK Secretary of State for Health, and was funded primarily by Government Grant in Aid. Other income was received from the NHS, commercial activities, grants, and other sources. HPA’s income for the fiscal year ending 31 March 2008, was £160.2 million from Revenue Government financing plus £109.2 million total operating income. Total average staff numbers for that year, including secondments and agency staff, were 3,394 staff.

== Organisation ==
Following consultation during April 2010, the HPA was organised into four groups: Microbiology Services, Health Protection Services, Biological Standards and Control, and the Centre for Radiation, Chemical and Environmental Hazards.

=== Microbiology Services ===
The Division included laboratory groups from the Centre for Infections, Centre for Emergency Preparedness and Response, the Regional Microbiology Network and their associated supports. The remit of the Centre included infectious disease surveillance, providing specialist and reference microbiology and microbial epidemiology, coordinating the investigation and cause of national and uncommon outbreaks, helping advise government on the risks posed by various infections and responding to international health alerts.

The Centre for Emergency Preparedness and Response prepared for and coordinated responses to potential healthcare emergencies, including possible acts of deliberate release. In addition, both basic and applied research were undertaken into understanding infectious diseases and the Centre manufactured a number of healthcare products, including vaccines and therapeutics. Internationally recognised as a world leader in microbiology research and testing, HPA's Porton Down Centre worked with foreign governments, international biotechnology and pharmaceutical corporations, and start-up and spin-out companies. The strategic goal of the Centre was "to build on and develop the intellectual assets of the organisation in partnership with industry." Areas of expertise include: bacterial vaccines, toxin therapeutics, Good Laboratory Practice (GLP) and in-vivo testing of compounds, biodefence and biosafety testing, diagnostics, and the provision of cell cultures.

The Regional Microbiology Network was composed of eight regional microbiology laboratories. In addition, 37 hospital microbiology laboratories participated as HPA collaborating laboratories. Together, these laboratories provided frontline diagnostic and public health microbiology services to NHS trusts and HPA health protection units.

=== Health Protection Services ===
This Division comprised two nationally organised services, each with their own head: LaRS and a new National Epidemiology Service. Combining these services into one grouping was intended to facilitate and reinforce close team working among those with skills relevant to delivering effective and consistent responses to significant health protection threats. LaRS provided support to the front line response by coordinating services at the regional and local level. It was a source of specialist advice and operational support, and it contributed actively to policy making and implementation in partnership with other HPA divisions and with the NHS, local authorities and other agencies.

=== Centre for Radiation, Chemical and Environmental Hazards (CRCE) ===
The Centre for Radiation, Chemical and Environmental Hazards comprised the Radiation Protection Division (formerly the National Radiological Protection Board) and the Chemical Hazards and Poisons Division. The base for the Centre was in Chilton, Oxfordshire.

=== National Institute for Biological Standards and Control (NIBSC) ===
The National Institute for Biological Standards and Control's (NIBSC) mission was to assure the quality of biological medicines. At the heart of the work was the preparation, storage and worldwide distribution of World Health Organization international standards and reference materials to provide benchmarks for product quality. In addition NIBSC provided testing services as the UK's Official Medicines Control Laboratory to ensure compliance with product specifications. These activities and advice provided by NIBSC were underpinned by leading edge scientific research covering a wide range of scientific disciplines. In April 2013, the NIBSC left the HPA and was merged with the UK's Medicines and Healthcare products Regulatory Agency.

== Health Protection Agency Annual Conference ==
The Health Protection Agency Annual Conference, which was attended by approximately one thousand health professionals and scientists to promote scientific excellence and best practice in health protection and emergency planning, brought together experts from a wide variety of disciplines to share knowledge of the latest scientific research and developments. The conference continued after 2013 as the "Public Health England Annual Conference".

== See also ==
- Similar Agencies
  - European Centre for Disease Prevention and Control (ECDC) European Union
  - Centers for Disease Control and Prevention (CDC) United States
  - Centre for Health Protection (CHP) Hong Kong
  - Institut de veille sanitaire (IVS) France
  - Public Health Agency of Canada (PHAC) Canada
  - National Centre for Disease Control (India)
