= Pharmaceuticals and Medical Devices Agency =

Japanese Independent Administrative Institution

- 独立行政法人医薬品医療機器総合機構; Dokuritsu-gyōsei hōjin iyakuhin-iryō-kiki-sōgō-kikō

Agency overview
- Formed: 1 April 2004; 22 years ago
- Employees: 873
- Website: www.pmda.go.jp

The Pharmaceuticals and Medical Devices Agency (独立行政法人医薬品医療機器総合機構) (PMDA) is a Japanese corporation, an Independent Administrative Institution, responsible for ensuring the safety, efficacy and quality of pharmaceuticals and medical devices in Japan. It is similar in function, in many respects, to the Food and Drug Administration in the United States, the Medicines and Healthcare products Regulatory Agency in the United Kingdom, the Spanish Agency of Medicines and Medical Devices in Spain or the Food and Drug Administration in the Philippines.

The PMDA adopted the International Council for Harmonisation (ICH) Electronic Common Technical Document (eCTD) format for electronic regulatory submissions beginning in 2017.

== Tasks ==
Among other things, the agency is tasked with the following:

- Drug and medical device testing:
  - Scientific review of market authorization applications based on Japanese pharmaceutical law
  - Advice in clinical trials or in the preparation of dossiers for the registration procedure (New Drug Applications (NDA))
  - Inspection and conformity assessment of Good Clinical Practice (GCP), Good Laboratory Practice (GLP), and Good Practice Systems and Programs (GPSP)
  - Auditing of manufacturers to ensure they conform to Good Manufacturing Practice (GMP) and have a suitable Quality Management System (QMS)
- Post-marketing drug safety:
  - The collection, analysis and distribution of data on the quality, efficacy, and safety data of medicines and medical devices
  - Advising consumers on approved products
  - Research on the development of industry standards
- Victim compensation:
  - Payment of medical costs, lost wages, and pain and suffering for those who experience injury or disability resulting from the use of medical products
  - Disbursement of funds to those infected with HIV as a result of blood transfusions

== Leadership ==
Yasuhiro Fujiwara, former head of the National Cancer Center Japan, became chief executive of the agency in April 2019. From 2008 to 2019, the chief executive of the agency was Tatsuya Kondo, a neurosurgeon and graduate of the University of Tokyo.

== See also ==
- Pharmaceuticals and Medical Devices Act
