= Bakari =

Bakari may refer to:

- Bakari (name) (includes a list of people with the name)
- Bakari, Togo, a village in Togo
- Bakari, Cameroon, a village in the commune of Touboro, Cameroon

== See also ==
- Bacari
- Bakhari
- Bakary
- Bakairi (disambiguation)
- Bakeri (disambiguation)
