= Bakare =

Nigerian given name

Bákàrè
- Gender: Male
- Language: Yoruba

Origin
- Origin: Nigerian
- Meaning: Abubakar or Abubakr, the nickname of the first Caliph of Islam.
- Region of origin: South West, Nigeria

Bákàrè is a Nigerian male given name and surname predominantly used among Muslims, particularly within the Yoruba community. Derived from Arabic, "Abubakar or Abubakr", the nickname of the first Caliph of Islam. The 'Abu' part is dispensed with, and the 'bakar' part gets a terminal vowel according to Yoruba morphological patterns.

== Notable individuals with the name ==
- Airat Bakare (born 1967), Nigerian female sprinter
- Ariyon Bakare, (born 1971), Nigerian English actor
- Ayo Bakare (born 1960), Nigerian basketball coach
- Ayinde Bakare (1912–1972), Nigerian musician
- Bibi Bakare-Yusuf (born 1970), Nigerian academic, writer and editor
- Tunde Bakare (Born 1954), Nigerian prophetic-apostolic pastor
- Ibrahim Bakare (born 2002), Nigerian English footballer
- Laide Bakare, Nigerian actress
- Michael Bakare (born 1986), Nigerian English footballer
- Musa Bakare (born 1971), Nigerian swimmer
- Dami Bakare (born 22 September 1988), Nigerian British volleyball player
- Peter Bakare (born 1997), Nigerian businessman
- Olumide Bakare (1953–2017), Nigerian actor
- Dele Bakare (born 1989), Nigerian software developer and entrepreneur
- S.B. Bakare (born 1922), Nigerian businessman
- Rasak Ojo Bakare (born 1964), Nigerian professor
- Bakare Gbadamosi (born 1930), Nigerian Yoruba poet
- Tobi Bakare (born 1992) Ex BBNaija housemate and Nigerian actor.
- Damilola Bakare (born 1997) hails from Odoogbolu Ogun state. A Development Communication expert at the Aig-Imoukhuede foundation leading public sector transformation.

== See also ==
- Bakari (name)
- Bakary
