= Dele Bakare =

Nigerian software developer

- Born: Oladele Ibukun Bakare; 8 February 1989 (age 37)
- Education: Anglia Ruskin University,
- Occupations: software developer; entrepreneur
- Website: www.findworka.com

Dele Bakare (born Oladele Ibukun Bakare 8 February 1989) is a Nigerian software developer and entrepreneur from Ibadan, Oyo State in Nigeria. He is the founder and CEO of Findworka, a Nigerian startup that hires software developers and builds custom software products. He formerly served as a senior software developer at Infinion Technologies and technology lead at BudgIT. In 2016, he was nominated for the Future Awards Africa Prize for Science and Technology.

== Career ==
Just before obtaining his diploma in software engineering from NIIT, Dele was working as a software developer at Infinion technologies. He left Infinion technologies to co-found Jobs in Nigeria alongside Temitayo Olufuwa. He is currently a fellow of Swiss Africa Business Innovation & Initiative and Founders Gym, an online program that trains underrepresented founders on how to raise money to scale their tech startups.

== Findworka ==
In February 2016, Dele founded Findworka, a company set up to address the gap between the demand and supply of software developers. The company has raised seed investment from Oluseun Onigbinde and the Co-Creation Hub. In 2019, Connect Nigeria listed it as one of the top 5 website for freelancers in Nigeria.

== End SARS movement and the #StopRobbingUs campaign ==
After young software engineer Toni Astro was arrested by police in Lagos, he was one of the tech founders who joined their voice with that of other tech leaders in the Nigerian tech community to condemn widespread police harassment and extortion by the Nigerian police force. The other tech leaders who have also condemned the harassment include Bosun Tijani, Jason Njoku, Adetunji Eleso, Adewale Yusuf, Tayo Oviosu, Jessica Hope, Onyeka Akumah, Chinedu Azodoh, Editi Effiong, Damilola Teidi-Ayoola, Femi Longe, Idris Ayodeji Bello, Jay Alabraba, Kola Aina, Shola Akinlade, Gbenga Agboola, Mark Essien, Sim Shagaya, Aanu Adeoye, Tomiwa Aladekomo, Oo Nwoye, Nelson Olaonipekun, Chijioke Dozie to name a few.

== Awards and recognitions ==
In 2016, for his efforts in founding Findworka, Dele Bakare was nominated for the Future Awards prize in science and technology. Other nominees included Shola Akinlade, Olaniran Abiola, Oluyomi Ojo and Andrew Airelobhegbei.

Dele was one of the speakers at Techplus 2019, an annual tech conference that takes place in Lagos. In 2019, the theme was digital social innovation. He was a speaker alongside Hon. Akin Alabi (Naira Bet), Dr Sid, Jackye (BBN), Bolanle Banwo (The Female Designer Movement), Karounwi Anuoluwapo (Yorlang), Babs Ogundeyi, Bukola Akingbade (Kucheza), Debo Odunlana, Dele Bakare, Gabriel Okeowo, Funto Akinbesehin, Lola Esan, Odunayo Eweniyi (Piggyvest), Ola Brown (Flying Doctor), Osagie Alonge (Opay), Samson Ogbole, Tobi Aigbogun and others. The event also featured keynotes from Silas Adekunle, robotics engineer and Dr. Wendy Okolo, aeronautics engineer at NASA.
