= Onyeka =

- Gender: Unisex
- Language: Igbo

Origin
- Origin: Nigeria
- Meaning: someone who is strong
- Region of origin: South East, Nigeria

Onyeka audio is a Nigerian given name and surname of Igbo origin, it means “Who is greater” It is a name that evokes feelings of awe, respect, and connection to the divine. The diminutive forms include Onyekachi and Onyekachukwu which mean "Who is greater than God".

== Notable individuals with the name ==
=== As a forename ===
- Onyeka Nubia, British historian and author
- Onyeka Onwenu (1952–2024), Nigerian singer/songwriter, actress, and activist, known professionally as Onyeka
- Onyeka Ibe (born 1971) Nigerian-American painter
- Onyeka Ibezim (born 1978), Nigerian politician
- Onyeka Akumah (born 1984), Nigerian entrepreneur
- Odafa Onyeka Okolie (born 1985), Nigerian former professional footballer
- Onyeka Igwe (born 1986), British-Nigerian artist
- Onyeka Nwelue (born 1988), Nigerian writer, jazz musician and film-maker
- Onyeka Azike (born 1990), Nigerian weightlifter.
- Onyeka Lucky (born 1995), Nigerian football player
- Onyeka Okongwu (born 2000), American professional basketball player
- Onyeka Gamero (born 2006), American football player

=== As a surname ===
- Ikechukwu Onyeka, Nigerian film director
- Celestina Onyeka (born 1984), Nigerian former footballer
- Godfrey Onyeka (born 1994), professional Canadian football player
- Nakas Onyeka (born 1995), former professional Canadian football player
- Kene Onyeka (born 1996), professional Canadian football player
- Frank Onyeka (born 1998), Nigerian professional footballer
- Kosi Onyeka (born 1999), Canadian professional football
- Tyreece Onyeka (born 2001), English professional footballer
- Francis Onyeka (born 2007), German professional footballer

== See also ==
- Onyeka and the Academy of the Sun, 2022 science fiction novel
