= Mohammed Ibrahim Jega =

Nigerian Entrepreneur

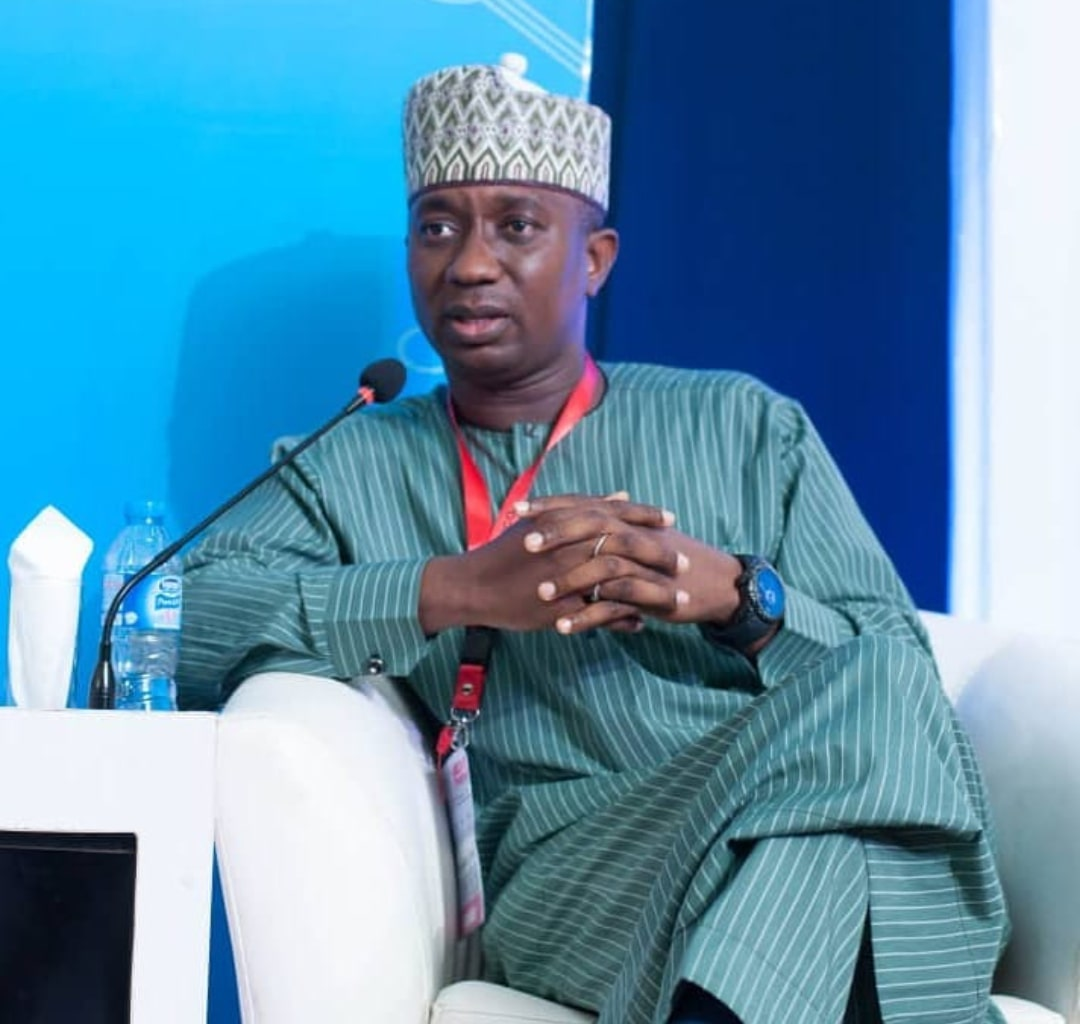
- Jega in 2018
- Born: June 15, 1981 (age 45); Kaduna, Nigeria
- Education: Ahmadu Bello University
- Occupation: Entrepreneur
- Employer: VoguePay
- Known for: StartUp Arewa
- Title: Chief Business Development Officer of VoguePay | Founder of StartUp Arewa | Co-founder of Domineum

Mohammed Ibrahim Jega (born June 15, 1981), an indigene of Jega, Kebbi State, is a Nigerian entrepreneur and technology startup founder. He is better known as the chief business development officer at the online payment processing gateway VoguePay.

Born and raised in Kaduna State, Jega founded the technology and innovation hub StartUp Arewa in 2016.

He was named as one of the members of Nigeria's presidential advisory group along with CcHUB founder Bosun Tijani in 2018. Jega was also part of Nigerian vice president Yemi Osinbajo's delegation to Silicon Valley in the same year.

His investment interest ranges from financial technology or block-chain technology to cyber security. In 2018, he joined the blockchain startup KickCity as an advisor on business development and growth in Africa.

Jega was named as one of the directors of the Silicon Valley–based the Founder Institute in February 2020.

In the year 2017, he was listed as one of the most influential young Nigerians by Advance Media.

== Early life and education ==
Jega was born in Kaduna, where he spent most part of his early life. He graduated with a bachelor's degree from the Ahmadu Bello University (ABU), Zaria, in 2003.

== Career ==
=== VoguePay ===
Jega joined VoguePay as one of its directors. VoguePay was founded in 2012.

Despite not having any venture-backing, the startup has grown to processing millions of dollars' worth of transactions daily. Jega said the company's approach to improving its products was the reason behind the rise in its numbers.

In 2019, VoguePay was named Online Payment Company of the Year at the African Ambassadors and Diaspora Interactive Forum (AAFID) summit in London.

=== StartUp Arewa ===
Jega founded StartUp Arewa in 2016. It now has different hubs in 19 states in Nigeria, helping young tech entrepreneurs and digital talents make the most of those skills.

The innovation hub launched a summit in 2018 that allowed over 500 young Nigerians to learn new digital skills.

Since its launch, StartUp Arewa has partnered with state governments in Northern Nigeria and other private individuals in an effort to grow the tech community in the region.

The startup incubation programmes have been supported by Nigeria's Bank of Industry (BOi) and Coders for Africa.

=== Domineum ===
The Jega co-founded Domineum, the first distributed ledger technology company providing blockchain as a service solution in Africa.

Domineum, founded in 2017, was reported to have helped African governments save over $5 million in 2019 alone. Jega co-founded this company along with another entrepreneur, Geoffrey Weli-Wosu.

Presently, the startup is working with several governments and individuals in Africa, the Caribbean and some parts of Europe.

== Recognitions ==
- Nishadi TV named Jega as one of the Top Twenty Northern Entrepreneurs under 40 in 2017.
- At the 2016 Africa Youths Award in Kenya, Jega was honoured with the "Entrepreneur of the Year" award.
