= Citizens' Gavel =

Lagos-based human rights organization

Citizen Gavel
- Founded: 7 May 2017; 9 years ago in Yaba, Lagos, Lagos State, Nigeria
- Founder: Nelson Olanipekun
- Type: Nonprofit; NGO
- Headquarters: Lagos, WC1; Nigeria
- Location: Nigeria
- Services: Protecting human rights
- Fields: Legal advocacy, Media attention, direct-appeal campaigns, research, lobbying
- Team Lead: Nelson Olanipekun
- Website: gavel.ng

Citizens' Gavel (also known as Tech for Justice or Gavel) is a civic tech organization aimed at improving the pace of justice delivery through the use of technology. It was established in 2017 as Open Justice by Nelson Olanipekun, from an incubation programme of Civic Hive, the incubation and media arm of BudgIT.

== History ==
Gavel, a product of an incubation programme of Civic Hive (the incubation and media arm of BudgIT) was established in 2017 in Lagos and later opened an office Ibadan in Oyo State and Abuja. It was founded by Nelson Olanipekun, a law graduate from the Ekiti State University. It was known as Open Justice at the time of establishment.

== Structure ==
Citizens' Gavel operates from offices in Ibadan, Lagos and Abuja. The head of the organization is addressed as the Team Leader and he also happens to be the founder of the organization. Gavel has 16 full-time staff and works with over 150 lawyers across 19 states of Nigeria. Gavel set up 2 arms to create diversification in their approach. These arms are JusticeLab and Podus. JusticeLab is focused on addressing systemic issues by responding to issues around weakness in the judicial system of Nigeria especially in areas it affects citizens. Podus is focused on linking citizens who have suffered or are suffering from security agency brutality to lawyers. Podus is already on the Google Play Store and it works like Uber such that victims can log into the app, enter in their issue/case and a lawyer within their vicinity can be alerted to assist them.

== Objectives and principles ==
The objectives of Citizens' Gavel is to use technology in accelerating justice delivery within the legal framework of Nigeria. This they do by linking those who cannot afford legal counsel to Pro bono lawyers. Also, they aim at using technology to digitise the activities of the court for public use to make a transparent judicial system in Nigeria.

== Activities ==
=== On police brutality ===
In April 2019, Citizens' Gavel challenged the Nigerian Police Force to conduct mental health assessment on the officers or face legal action. This came after the killing of Kolade Johnson by an officer of the State Anti Cultism Squad (SACS) in Lagos The organization challenged the government of Oluwaseyi Makinde of Oyo State to make the justice sector a priority because of the reported cases of police brutality in the State.

=== Digital rights promotion ===
In August 2019, Gavel signed a Memorandum of understanding with Paradigm Initiative (a social enterprise supporting under-served youth) to provide legal support to promote digital rights in Nigeria as well as educating the public about digital rights and its laws in Nigeria.

End SARS

End SARS was a social media movement on Twitter in 2018 led by Segun Awosanya and Citizens' Gavel to stop the brutal acts of the State Anti-Robbery Squad of the Nigeria Police Force. The movement led to mentions by celebrities and politicians which finally led to the end of the operation and rebranding into FSARS.

=== DSS vs Sowore ===
On the 7th of December 2019, Gavel asked Clement Boutillier of the European Union to blacklist the Department of State Services (DSS) for arresting pro-democracy reporter Omoyele Sowore and to impose a travel ban on DSS leaders. This was after the DSS operatives stormed the Federal High Court, Abuja to rearrest Sowore.

== Funding ==
Gavel was able to raise about $225,000 up till 2019.

== Controversies ==
After the establishment of Operation Amotekun, the founder and Team Leader, Nelson Olanipekun addressed the public on the operation on behalf of the organization debunking the comments of the Attorney general of the federation Abubakar Malami that the operation was illegal which was a very controversial issue at the said time.
