= Bakairi =

Bakairi or Bacairi may refer to:

- Bakairi people, an ethnic group of Brazil
- Bakairi language, a language of Brazil

== See also ==
- Bakeri (disambiguation)
- Bakari (disambiguation)
