= Catholic Missionary Union =

The Catholic Missionary Union can refer to:

- Catholic Missionary Union of England and Wales founded in 1996
- Apostolic Missionary Union which also known as the Catholic Missionary Union
