= Biney =

Biney is a surname. Notable people with the surname include:

- Ama Biney (born 1960s), British historian and journalist
- Maame Biney (born 2000), American short track speedskater
- Oliver Biney (born 1983), British professional wrestler
- W.H. Biney (born 1986), Ghanaian businessman
