= MC Yanmife =

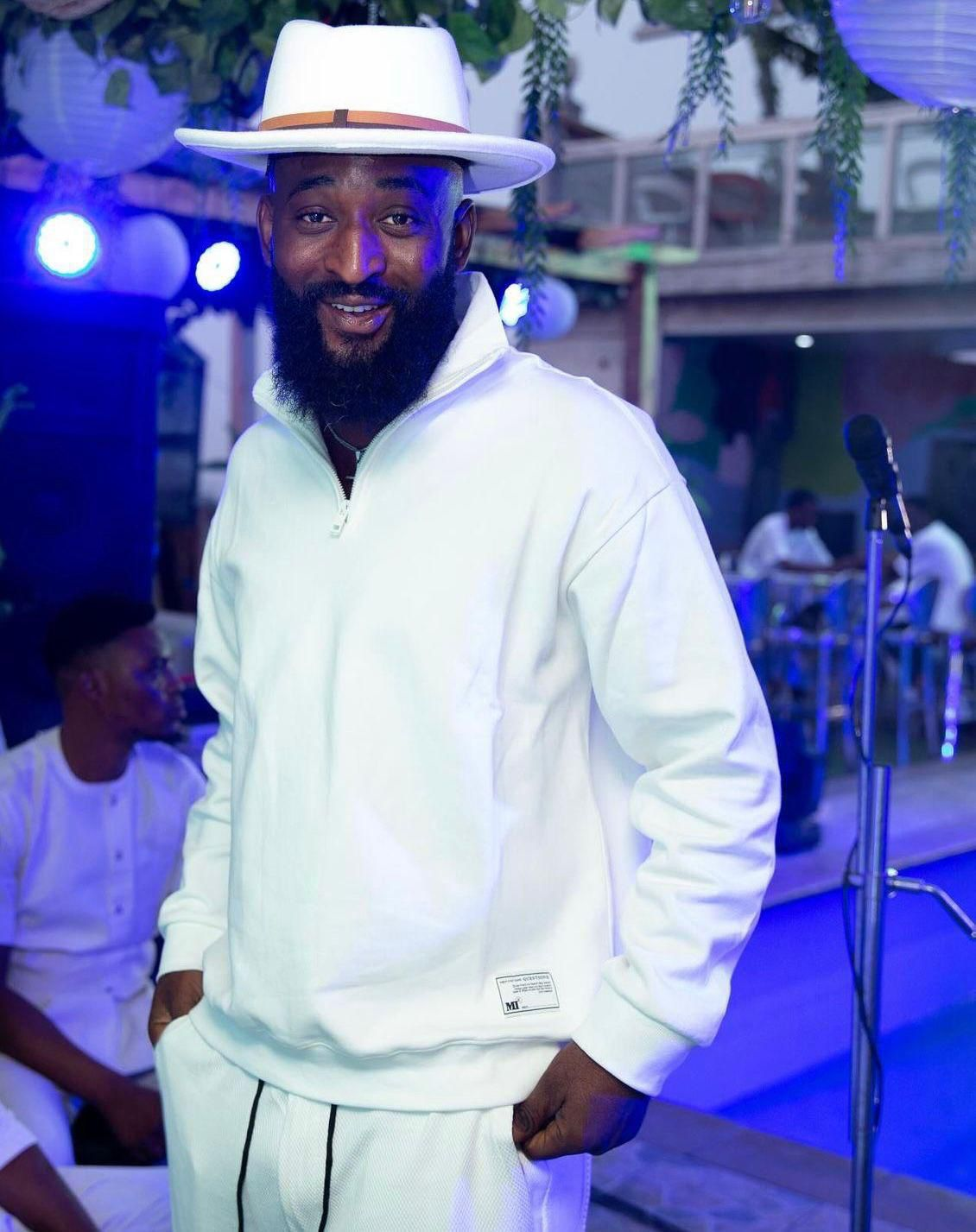
- Born: Faremi Emmanuel; September 13, 1994 (age 32); Nigeria
- Occupations: Master of ceremonies, comedian, actor
- Years active: 2010s–present

Faremi Emmanuel (born 13 September 1994), professionally known as MC Yanmife, is a Nigerian master of ceremonies, comedian and stage performer. His work includes live event hosting, theatre productions and cultural performances in Nigeria and the United Kingdom.

== Early life and education ==
Emmanuel attended Goodwill Primary School before enrolling at Loyola College, Ibadan. He later attended Goodwill Comprehensive College and completed his secondary education at Bloom Height School, Idi-Ape, in 2011.

He studied Architecture at The Polytechnic, Ibadan, between 2012 and 2014 before gaining admission to Olabisi Onabanjo University through direct entry in 2016. He graduated in 2021.

== Career ==
During his studies at The Polytechnic, Ibadan and later at Olabisi Onabanjo University, Emmanuel participated in campus entertainment and cultural activities.

In 2023, he relocated to the United Kingdom, where he continued his work in live entertainment and stage performance. In September of that year, he served as host and comedian for the Newcastle Fashion Runway, a fashion and cultural event organised by LagX in Newcastle, England.

In February 2024, he organised the All-White Party in Lagos.

In March 2026, Emmanuel participated in Black Pride Festival 2026 at CAST Waterdale Doncaster Performing Arts Theatre as one of the Spotlight performing acts. As part of the festival, he also contributed to creative workshops for children under the Root Rockers Culture and Diversity Project.

In April 2026, he appeared as a performing actor at Utopia Theatre in Sheffield, where he performed Ilu Le, a theatrical interpretation inspired by the music of Victor Olaiya incorporating drama, storytelling and live African drumming.

== Film ==
Emmanuel portrayed Tyler in the short film Jada's Cross, a drama exploring themes of relationships, emotional trauma and mental health.
