= Loyola College, Ibadan =

Coordinates: 7.39086°N 3.92569°E

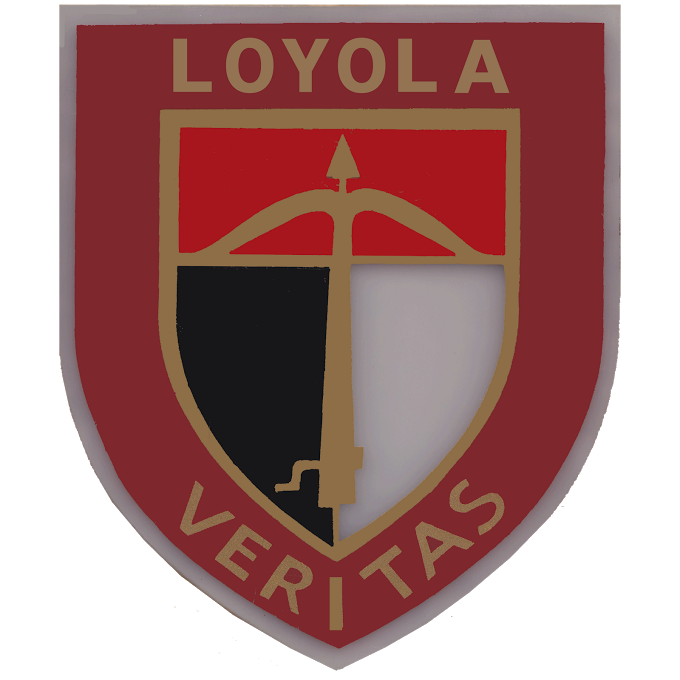
- Ibadan, Oyo State; Nigeria

Information
- Type: Public
- Motto: Veritas (Truth)
- Established: 1954; 72 years ago
- Gender: Boys
- Campus type: Urban
- Website: www.loyolacollegeibadan.org

Loyola College, Ibadan (LCI) is a boys-only Government-owned College in Oyo State, Nigeria, founded by the Catholic Missionary in 1954. It is located along Old Ife Road, Agodi area in Ibadan. Since its establishment, the school has produced notable alumni in Medicine, Engineering, Law, Politics, Media and other professions.

== Recent developments ==
In October 2023, IT professional Ladele Ajao, founder of Safetrucks Nigeria Limited and an alumnus of the college, awarded scholarships to six Senior Secondary School 3 (SSS3) students. The scholarships covered their WAEC registration fees, sponsorship for the UTME for two students, and a full scholarship to the top UTME performer.

== Scholarship ==
On 26 October 2023, Ladele Ajao, the founder of Safetrucks Nigeria Limited and an IT professional, awarded scholarships to six Loyola College students in Ibadan. The Scholarship was made known during his visit to his alma mater Loyola College in Ibadan, where he reflected on the role Loyola College played in nurturing dreams, including his own when he was still a student in the school.

== Building donation ==
In September 2017, the Old Boys Association of 1988 set of the school renovated classrooms for the junior secondary school of Loyola school in Ibadan.

On 30 July 2022, Governor Rotimi Akeredolu of Ondo state and the Old Boys Association of Loyola school, and the members of the 1968/1972 set, who were classmates, officially presented a spacious hall to the school administration and the Old Boys Association. Loyola College, which happened to be the Governor's alma mater, received this generous donation. The announcement of the event was made known by the Chief of staff, under the title "The donation of the hall", it serves as a commemoration of their 50 years since graduating from the school and reflects their commitment to giving back to their alma mater. The hall was named after him

== Road Safety Club creation ==
The Oyo State Government has launched Road Safety Club advocacy in the entire secondary school in Oyo State, Nigeria. Loyola College, Ibadan is the first point in which the club will take off; the club is to let students be aware of traffic rules and regulations and to orientate the students about how to excel in their education.

== Notable alumni ==
Loyola College has produced many notable alumni in different fields, they include:

- Lamidi Ona-Olapo Adesina, former governor of Oyo State (20 January 1939 – 11 November 2012). And also an educator
- Oluwarotimi Odunayo Akeredolu, a Senior Advocate of Nigeria (SAN), Nigerian Politician, and Executive Governor of Ondo State.
- Dele Bakare, Nigerian software engineer and entrepreneur and also a Founder and the chief executive officer (CEO) of Findworka.
- Raymond Dokpesi, Nigerian media businessman
- Ambassador Akin Fayomi, Nigerian Career Diplomat, he was the head of political Affairs at High Commission of Nigeria, London (July 2004 – March 2007).
- Oluseun Onigbinde, entrepreneur and open Data Analyst and also the Co-founder and the chief executive officer (CEO) of budgLT.
- Lawson Oyekan, Ceramic Sculptor
- professor Patrick Utomi, A Nigerian Professor of political Economy and Management expert and also a Former Presidential aspirant
- Oba Adeyeye Enitan Ogunwusi, traditional monarch of Ile-ife
- Ekpo Una Owo Nta, he is a Lawyer, and also the Chairman of the Independent Corrupt Practices and Other Related Offences Commission (ICPC)
- Olumide Oyedeji, basketball player who played professionally in the NBA in US and also captained the Nigerian National team (D’Tigers) at the 2012 Olympics
- George Latunji Lasebikan, he was an Anglican Bishop of Ondo in 2007 in Ondo State
- Hanks Anuku, a Nigerian-Ghanaian Actor
- Ladele Ajao, Founder of Safetrucks Limited and also K3bot Oyo State
