= D. bakeri =

D. bakeri may refer to:

- Delphinium bakeri, the Baker's larkspur, a perennial herb species endemic to California
- Ducula bakeri, the Vanuatu Imperial-pigeon, a bird species endemic to Vanuatu

== See also ==
- Bakeri (disambiguation)
