= Oluseun Onigbinde =

Nigerian entrepreneur and data analyst

Oluseun David Onigbinde
- Born: September 18, 1985 (age 40); Osogbo, Osun State, Nigeria
- Education: Stanford Executive Program in Social Entrepreneurship Bachelor of Engineering (B.Eng.), Electrical/Electronics Engineering. Federal University of Agriculture, Abeokuta Loyola College, Ibadan
- Occupations: Open Data advocate, entrepreneur
- Years active: 2011–present
- Known for: Co-Founder and CEO of BudgIT.
- Notable work: Tracka, Fitila.africa, yourbudgit.com
- Spouse: Oluwaseun Agbelusi (m. 2015)
- Children: 3
- Website: oluseunonigbinde.wordpress.com

Oluseun Onigbinde (born 18 September 1985) is a Nigerian entrepreneur and open data analyst, known as the co-founder and CEO of budgIT, a Nigerian civic startup. Oluseun Onigbinde is an advocate for fiscal transparency and open data.

In 2012, he was awarded the Future Awards Prize for Science and Tech Innovation.

On 13 September 2019, Onigbinde was appointed as Technical Adviser in the Ministry of Budget and National Planning in Nigeria. His appointment was controversial among government critics. On Monday, 16 September 2019, Oluseun resigned from this position.

== Early life and education ==
Oluseun is a native of Masifa, Ogbomoso, Oyo State. He was born in Osogbo, presently Osun State, Nigeria. Oluseun obtained his primary and secondary school education at Loyola College, Ibadan. He scored nine distinctions in his West African Examinations Council's exam, earning the best result of the school's 2001 set.

Oluseun attended the University of Agriculture, Abeokuta where he obtained a bachelor of engineering (B.Eng.) in Electrical/Electronics Engineering and the Stanford university graduate school of business where he completed the executive program in social entrepreneurship.

== Career ==
During his NYSC, he was posted to Benin City where worked at Access bank. He later joined First Bank for a period of three and half years. It was while he was working at First Bank that he got the idea for BudgIT. According to him, his interest in banking was from the strategy angle, a space where he could contribute his ideas.

Oluseun Onigbinde is a recipient of several awards and he is currently an Obama Foundation Scholar at Columbia University. He is a board member of the ONE Africa Policy Advisory Board.

He was appointed as Technical Adviser at the Ministry of Budget and National Planning but resigned few days later.

=== BudgIT ===
In 2011, Oluseun Onigbinde and Joseph Agunbiade formed a team during a hackathon held at the Co-Creation Hub. It was here that he came up with the idea for a need to publicize government spending to the general public, leading to the startup BudgIT. In 2014, the Omidyar Network invested $400,000 in BudgIT; this has always been listed on their website. In June 2015, the Kaduna State government under the administration of Mallam El-Rufai, signed BudgIT to build Open Budget mobile portal similar to the Buharimeter; a platform which was built by BudgIT for Center for Democracy and Development to hold President Buhari accountable for his campaign promises. In January 2017, BudgIT raised an additional $3 million grant from Omidyar Network and Gates Foundation. In February 2016, Oluseun Onigbinde was honoured to make a presentation at the Chatham House under the African Project on issue of accountability and governance.

=== Civic Technology ===
Onigbinde is an advocate for data-driven journalism. He participated in a health journalism project as part of the Knight Innovation Fellowship of the International Center for Journalists. In 2014, BudgIT launched Tracka, which monitors public projects in over 600 communities in Nigeria.

His organization also founded Civic Hive, Nigeria's civic innovation hub, that incubates civic tech start-ups.

== Personal life ==
Seun resides in Lagos with his wife, Oluwaseun, and daughters Wuraola, Ireoluwa and Adesuwa.

== Recognitions ==
- Ashoka Fellowship for Global Entrepreneurs.
- The Future Awards, 2012.
- World Summit Youth Award
- Knight International Journalism Fellow/ International Center for Journalists
- Harambe Fellowship (Harambe Entrepreneur Alliance)
- 2016 Aspen New Voices Fellowship
- 2016 Draper Hills Summer Fellowship, Stanford University (Center for Democracy, Development, and the Rule of the Law).
- Obama Foundation Scholar (2018 - 2019)
- Quartz Africa Innovators Award
- 2018 Archbishop Desmond Tutu Leadership Fellow
