= Bakari (name) =

Bakari is both a given name and a surname. Notable people with the name include:

== Given name ==
- Bakari Shamis Faki, Tanzanian politician
- Bakari Fofana (born 1962), Malian footballer
- Bakari Grant (born 1987), Canadian football player
- Bakari Hendrix (born 1977), American basketball player
- Michael Bakari Jordan (born 1987), American actor
- Bakari Koné (born 1981), Ivorian footballer
- Bakari Sellers (born 1984), American attorney, politician and commentator

== Surname ==
- Bahia Bakari (born 1996), French airplane crash survivor
- Dagui Bakari (born 1974), French-Ivorian footballer
- Grace Bakari (born 1954), Ghanaian sprinter
- Nurdin Bakari (born 1988), Tanzanian footballer
- Oumar Bakari (born 1980), French footballer
- Saïd Bakari (born 1994), French-Comorian footballer
- Tareq Bakari (born 1988), Moroccan writer

== See also ==
- Bakary
- Bakare
