= Olatunbosun =

Nigerian given name

ọlátúnbọ̀sún
- Gender: Male
- Language: Yoruba

Origin
- Origin: Yoruba
- Region of origin: South-west Nigeria

Other names
- Alternative spelling: Olatubosun
- Variant forms: Bọ̀sún, Túnbọ̀sún, Túbọ̀sún, Ọlátúbọ̀sún
- Nickname: 'Ola'
- Related names: Ọlábísí; Ọládèjọ; Ọlábọ̀dè; Ọlátúndé; Ọládipú̀pọ̀; Ọlákúnlé; Ọláyẹmí; Ọlábọ̀wálé; Ọládélé; Ọláwálé; Ọlásúnkànmí; Ọláṣubòmí; Ọlápéjú; Ọláṣèyí; Ọláfẹ́mi; Ọlákùnmi; Ọláṣọlá; Ọlátóbí; Ọlábùkún; Ọládàpọ̀

Ọlátúnbọ̀sún is a masculine name of Yoruba origin, from South-west Nigeria. The name is derived from a combination of three Yoruba words: ọlá, meaning "wealth"; túnbọ̀, meaning "continue to"; and sún, meaning "expand", "spread", or "shift". Therefore the meaning of the name is "wealth has expanded" or "wealth has shifted forward." It carries a positive and aspirational connotation, symbolising hope for the continued prosperity of the family.

== Origin and significance ==
Ọlátúnbọ̀sún is rooted in Yoruba culture and It is often given to children as a blessing or prayer for a life filled with wealth, and stability. By bestowing this name, families express their desire for future success and prosperity.

== Variants ==
- Bọ̀sún
- Túnbọ̀sún
- Túbọ̀sún
- Ọlátúbọ̀sún

== Notable people with the given name ==
=== Activists ===
- Ayoade Olatunbosun-Alakija, Nigeria's former chief humanitarian coordinator

=== Art and entertainment ===
- Olatubosun Oladapo (born 1943), Nigerian poet, playwright and music producer
- Tunbosun Aiyedehin (born 1973), Nigerian actress

=== Sports ===
- Olatunbosun "Tommy" Akingbesote (born 2003), American football player
- Bosun Lawal (born 2003), Irish professional footballer
- Bosun Ayeni (born 1978), Nigerian footballer

=== Politicians ===
- Bosun Tijani (born 1977), Nigerian minister of Communications, Innovation and Digital Economy

== People with the surname ==
- Sikiru Olatunbosun (born 1996) - Nigerian footballer
