= Yaba, Lagos =

Local council development area in Nigeria

Coordinates: 6.5097°N 3.3863°E

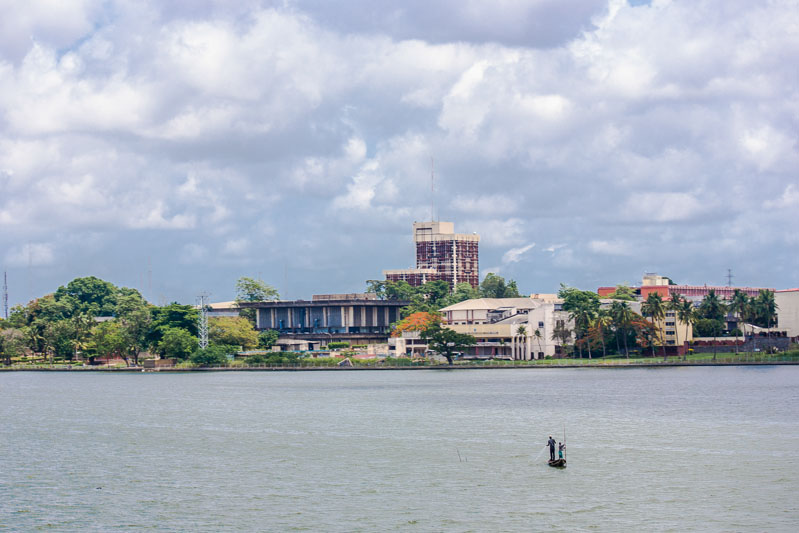
University of Lagos in Yaba

Yaba is a suburb located on Lagos Mainland, Lagos in Lagos State, Nigeria. With its educational institutions and technological start-ups, Yaba is considered the technological hub of Lagos. Inaugurated in 2021, the ultra-modern Mobolaji Johnson Central Station in Yaba connects Lagos with the country's third largest city, Ibadan, via one of the few standard-gauge railway lines in Africa. The bus station in Yaba stands out with its tent-like architecture. Yaba's market, especially around Tejuosho, is known as "the shopping centre of Lagos".

== History ==
Yaba Local council Development area was carved out of the old Lagos Mainland Local government area, which was created in 1977 as a separate Local government following the national reform of Local governments in September 1976. Lagos Mainland was carved out of Lagos city council which administered the Lagos Metropolitan city consisting of Lagos Island and Lagos Mainland. With the creation of three more Local governments on 27 August 1991, the former Lagos mainland was re-constituted, with Surulere carved out of it. Yaba Local Council Development Area was one of the 37 newly created Local Council development areas created out of Lagos Mainland by the administration of Senator Bola Ahmed Tinubu, after the state assembly passed a law creating new Local Council development areas.

== Educational institutions ==
There are several federal government institutions in the area, which include Queen's College, Methodist Girl's High School, the Nigerian Institute of Medical Research, the Yaba College of Technology, Igbobi College, the University of Lagos, the Federal Science and Technical College, Lagos state college of health technology (first college of health in Nigeria), and the Federal College of Education (Technical) Akoka.

CETEP City University is a private university in Yaba. The university has been offering undergraduate and postgraduate programmes since its establishment in 2005.

Lagos State College of Health Technology (LASCOHET) is an institution that offers degree programmes in the health sector, such as Health Information Management, Pharmacy Technology, Medical Laboratory Technology, Community Health Extension and Environmental Health Technology; it is located in Yaba.

== Tech start-ups ==
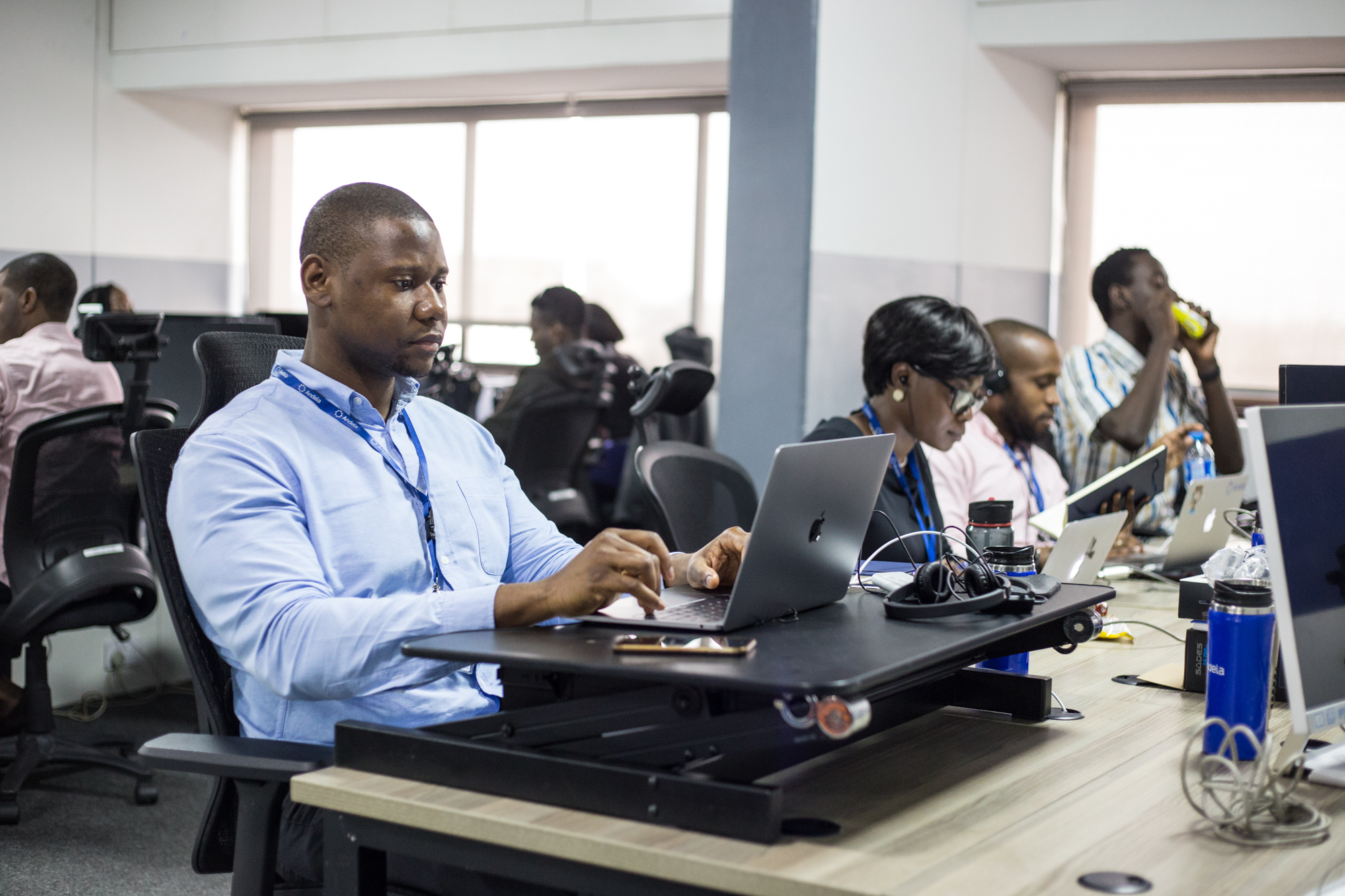
Tech unicorn Andela in Yaba

Yaba is also one of the favoured locations for the establishment of many companies. Thanks to numerous start-ups such as Hotels.ng, CcHUB and Andela, Yaba has developed into a technology centre. Andela is one of the seven tech unicorns of Africa[1].

The tech space in yaba became popular in late 2011 when Bosun Tijani and colleagues founded Cc-HUB, and it became one of Nigeria's pioneer startup incubator. With investment and support from organisations such as the Indigo Trust, Omidyar Network, MainOne Cable Company and the Lagos State government, it soon gained momentum and proceeded to install a fibre-optic-powered information superhighway. In 2011, former banker Seun Onigbinde co-founded BudgIT, a fiscal transparency project, on the third floor of CC Hub's six-storey building in Yaba. As one of the first early-stage startups to benefit from CC Hub's incubation drive in 2011, it received $5,000 of its $90,000 seed funding from billionaire businessman Tony Elumelu. Big names like Konga, eCommerce company valued at approximately $200 million as after raising $20 million in Series C rounds, arrived in 2013, while Africa Internet Group which has $469 million in 4 Rounds from six investors transferred six of its companies to Yaba in 2014. In same 2014 BudgIT received $400,000 grant from Omidyar. Mid 2016, Andela – a Nigerian-founded talent accelerator for programmers that has campuses in Lagos, Nairobi and New York – received $24 million in investment from the Chan Zuckerberg Initiative. In 2015, Hotels.ng, a hotel booking site in Nigeria secured $1.2 million in funding from Omidyar Network to expand its listings across Africa.

In 2016, Mark Zuckerberg attended a "Summer Bootcamp" where local children learn programming languages such as Python during their school holidays.

== Tourism ==
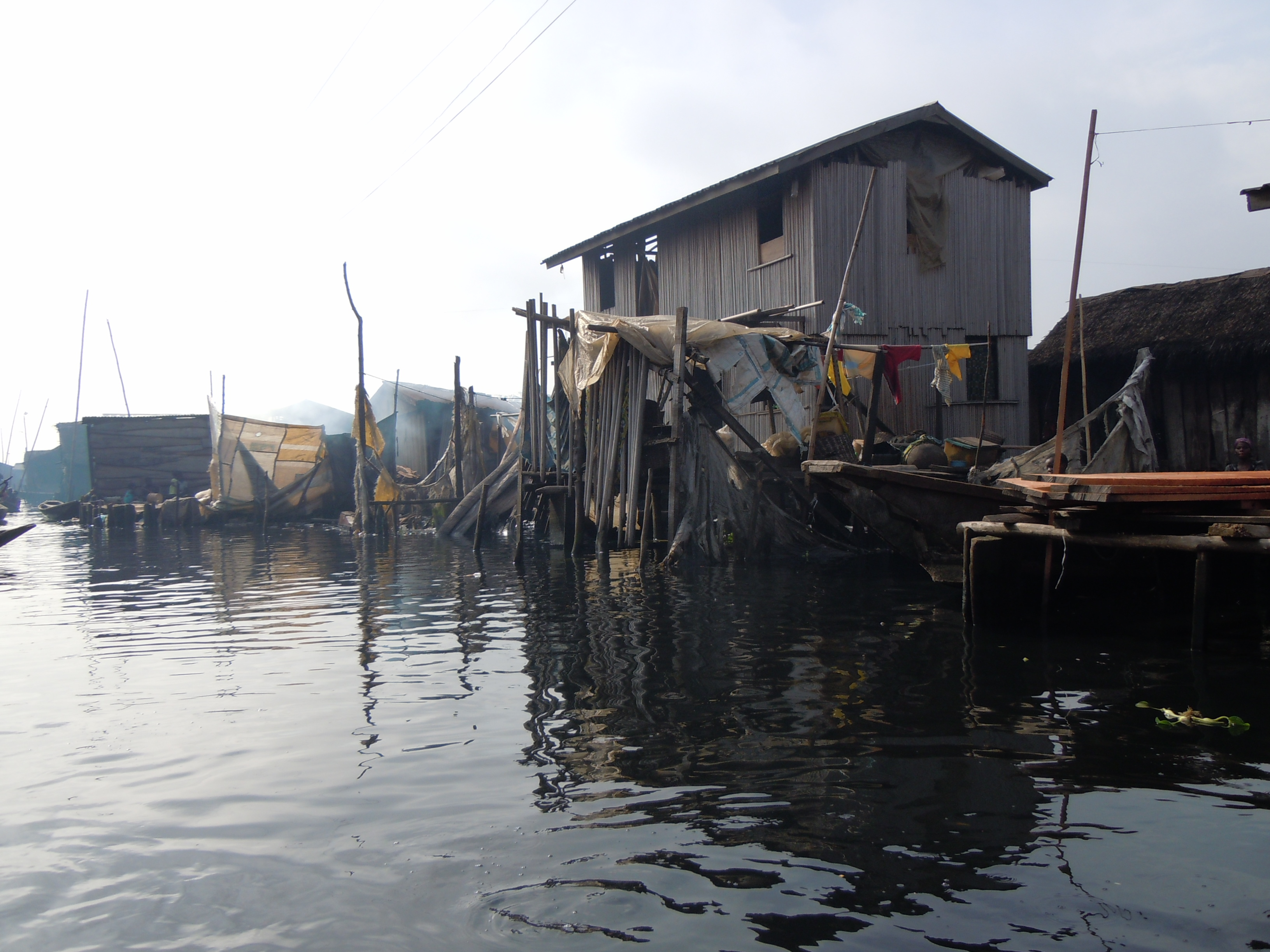
Makoko district

Yaba also includes the floating district of Makoko, which is literally considered a "no-go area" due to its lack of solid ground, but is also an insider tip among boat-suitable tourists due to the special characteristics of the inhabitants who live on the water.

However, visits to the district are typically recommended with a local guide.

== Hospitals ==
The Federal Neuro Psychiatric Hospital has been caring for psychiatric patients since 1907.

The 68 Nigerian Army Reference Hospital in Yaba played an integral role in the care of wounded Allied soldiers during World War II.

== Bargain market ==
Yaba market is also one of the busiest markets in Lagos. It is known for its low prices, and discount-price sales, especially in the evenings.

The market is known for its exceptionally affordable clothing. At the Tejuosho market, you can find large quantities of imported second-hand trousers, dresses, jackets, etc. Nigerian clothing is also displayed on mannequins for sale.

Those who do not want to shop in the open air can enter the Tejuosho shopping complex and browse through the various shops. Within the complex there is a pharmacy and several grocery and cosmetics shops. Another top shopping centre is the E-Centre, located directly on Commercial Avenue, and is home to the well-known Ozone cinemas. Many students visit the shopping centre to relax. There are various departments to fulfil the needs of visitors: e.g. for medical supplies, glasses, household goods and food.

== Notable institutions ==
- University of Lagos
- Yaba College of Technology
- Nigerian Institute of Medical Research
- Nigeria Centre For Disease Control Central Public Health Laboratory
- Infectious Disease Hospital, Yaba
- 68 Nigeria Army Reference Hospital
- Lagos University Teaching Hospital Annex
- Federal College of Education, Yaba
- West African Examination Council
- West African College of Surgeons
- Methodist Girls High School, Yaba

Reagan Memorial Baptist Girls’ Secondary School, Yaba

- Ozone Cinemas
- Queen's College Yaba
- All Saints Anglican Church, Yaba
- St. Finbarr's College
- Our Lady of Apostle Secondary School, Yaba
- Lagos State College of Health Technology

== Photo gallery ==
Important places in Yaba

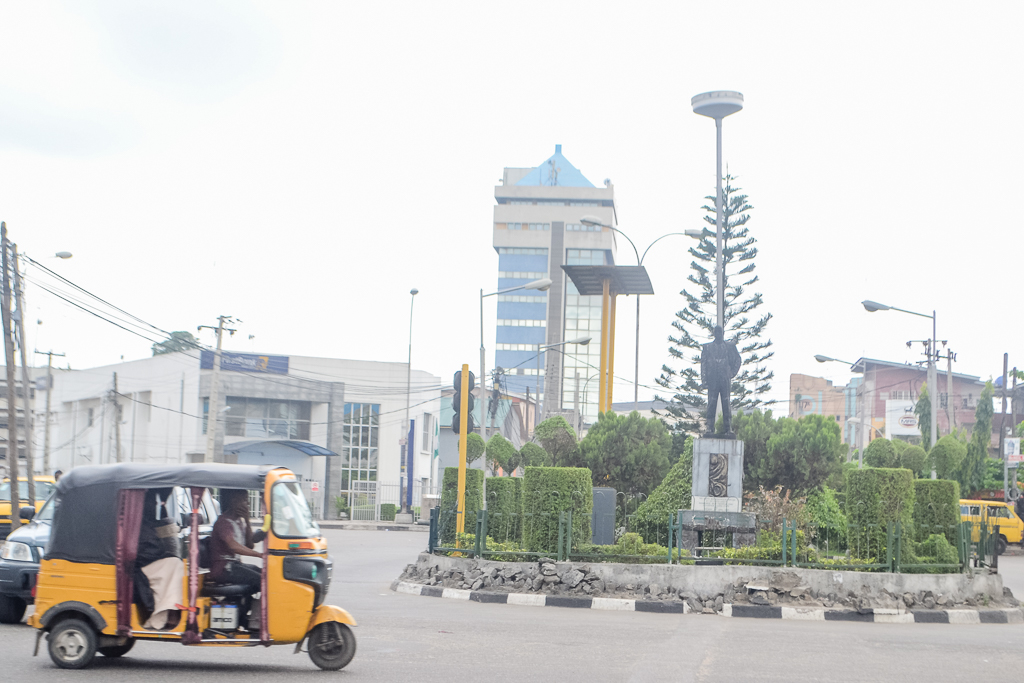
Sabo Roundabout at Yaba

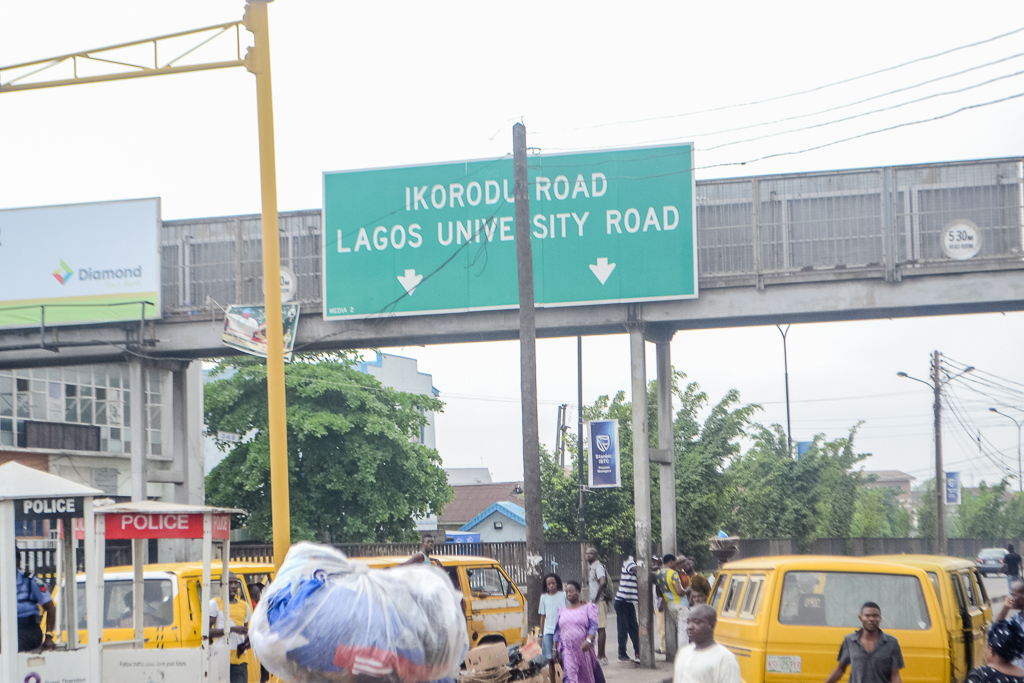
Road directional at Sabo Yaba

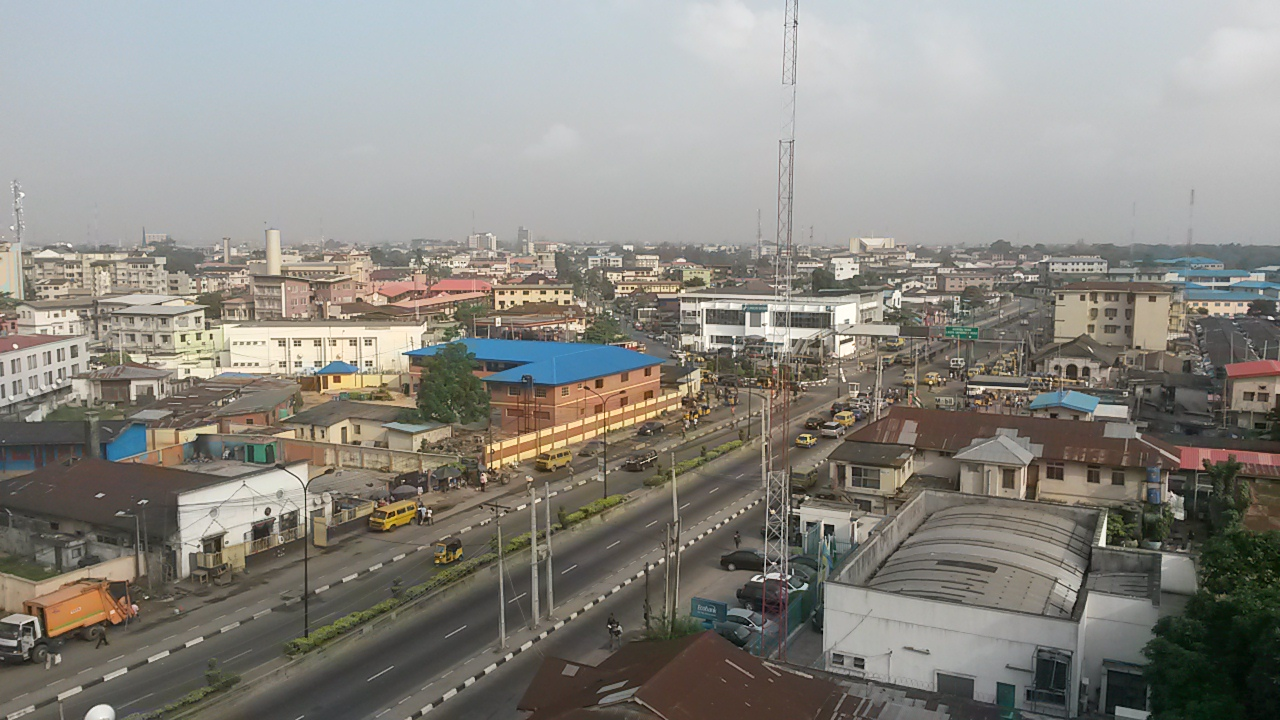
Yaba, Lagos, 2013

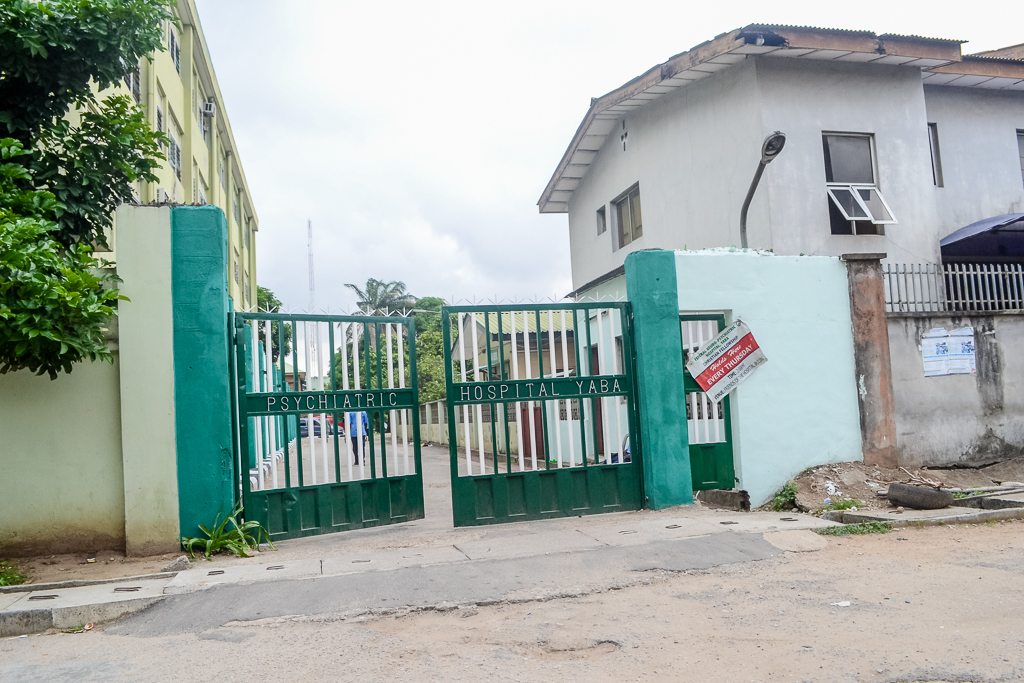
Psychiatric Hospital Yaba

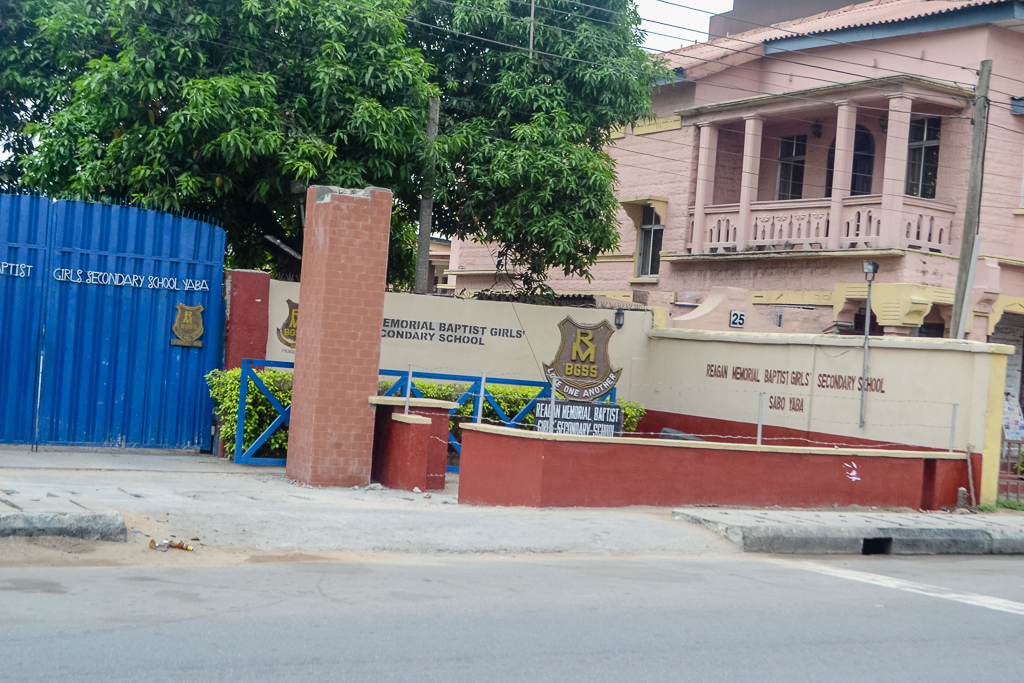
Reagan Girls Memorial Secondary School

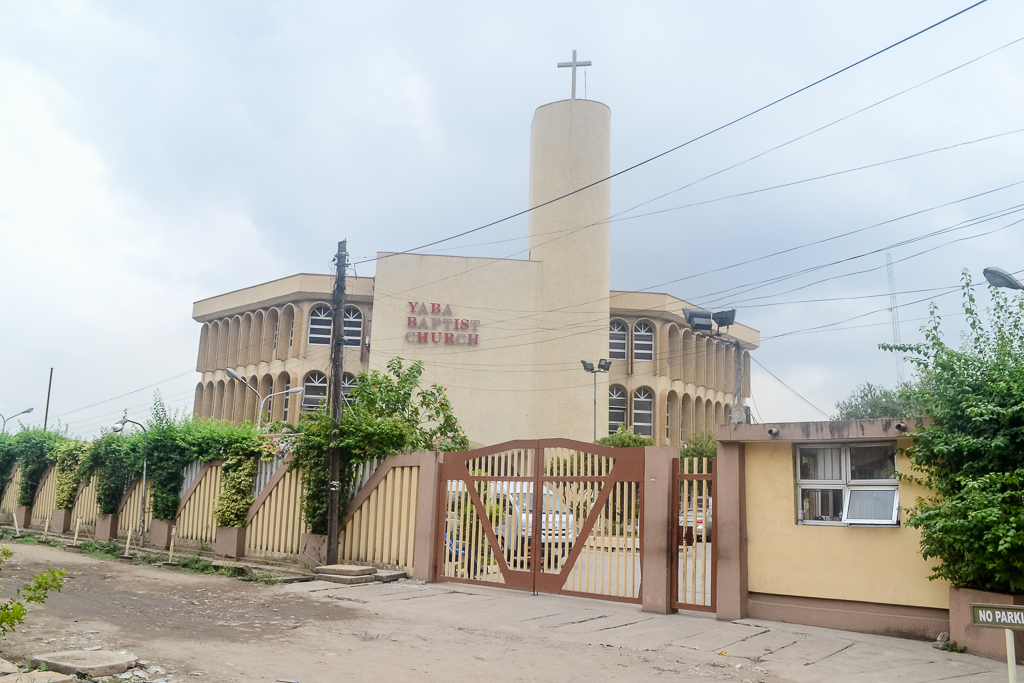
Yaba Baptist Church

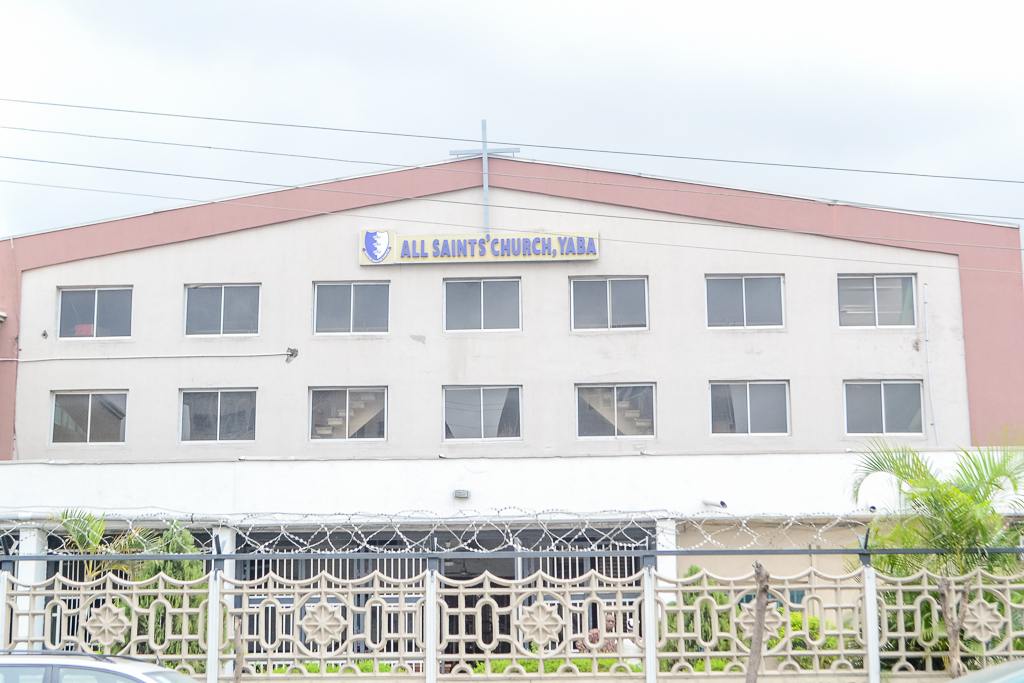
All Saints Anglican Church Yaba

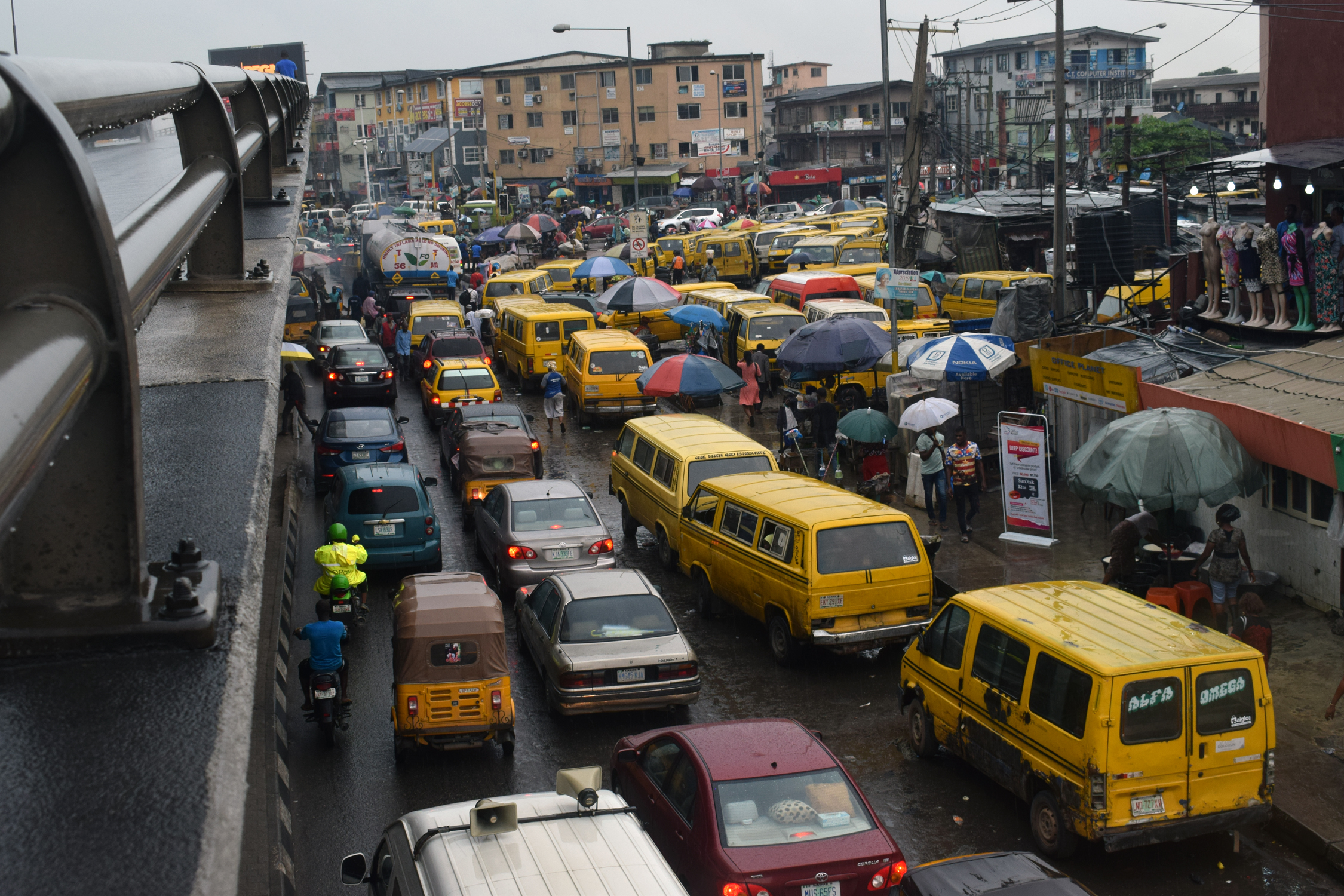

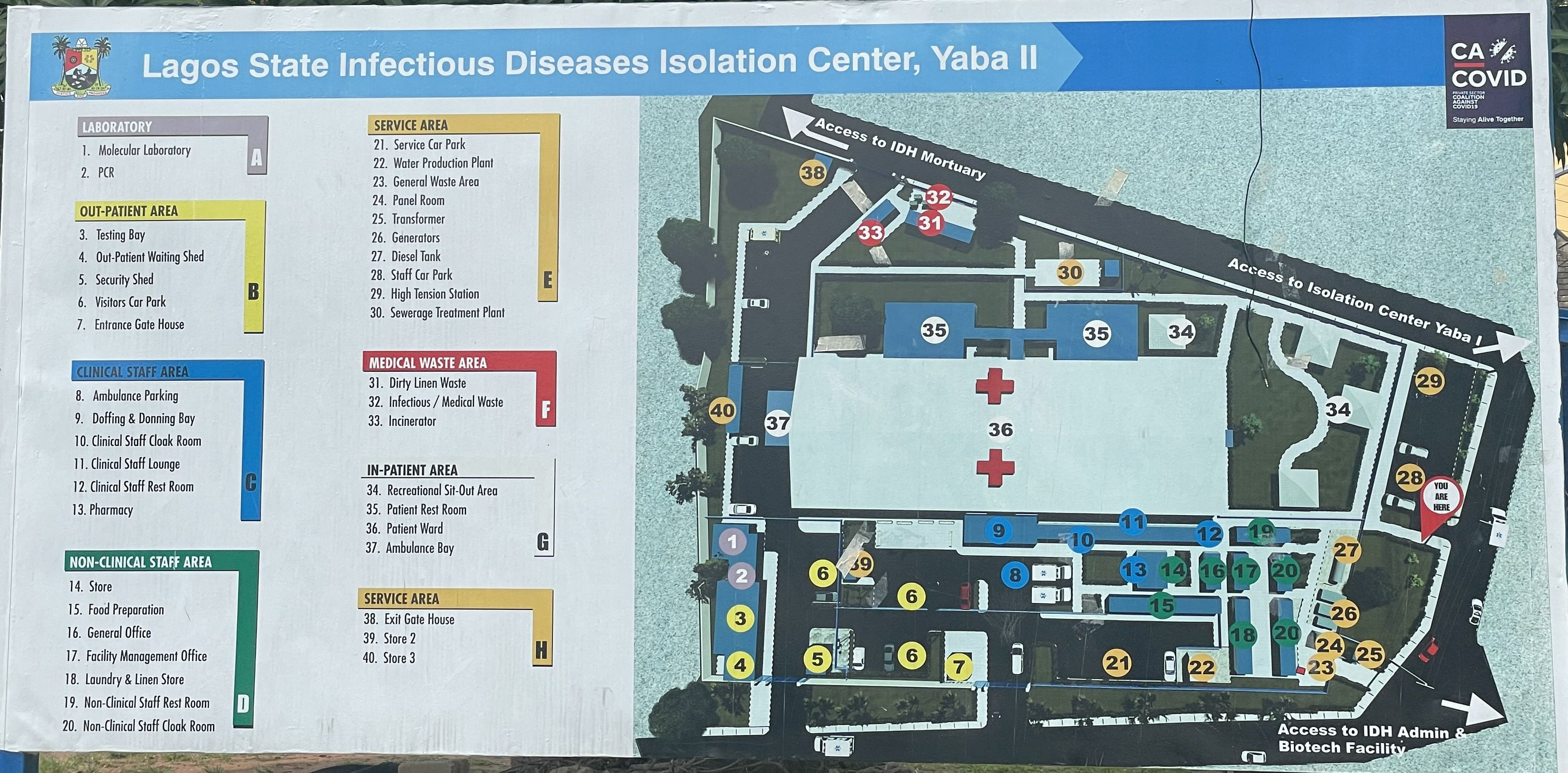
Layout of the COVID-19 isolation centre, Infectious Diseases Hospital, Yaba.

== See also ==
- Yabacon Valley
- Yaba monkey tumor virus
