= Bilikiss Adebiyi-Abiola =

Recycler in Nigeria

Bilikiss Adebiyi
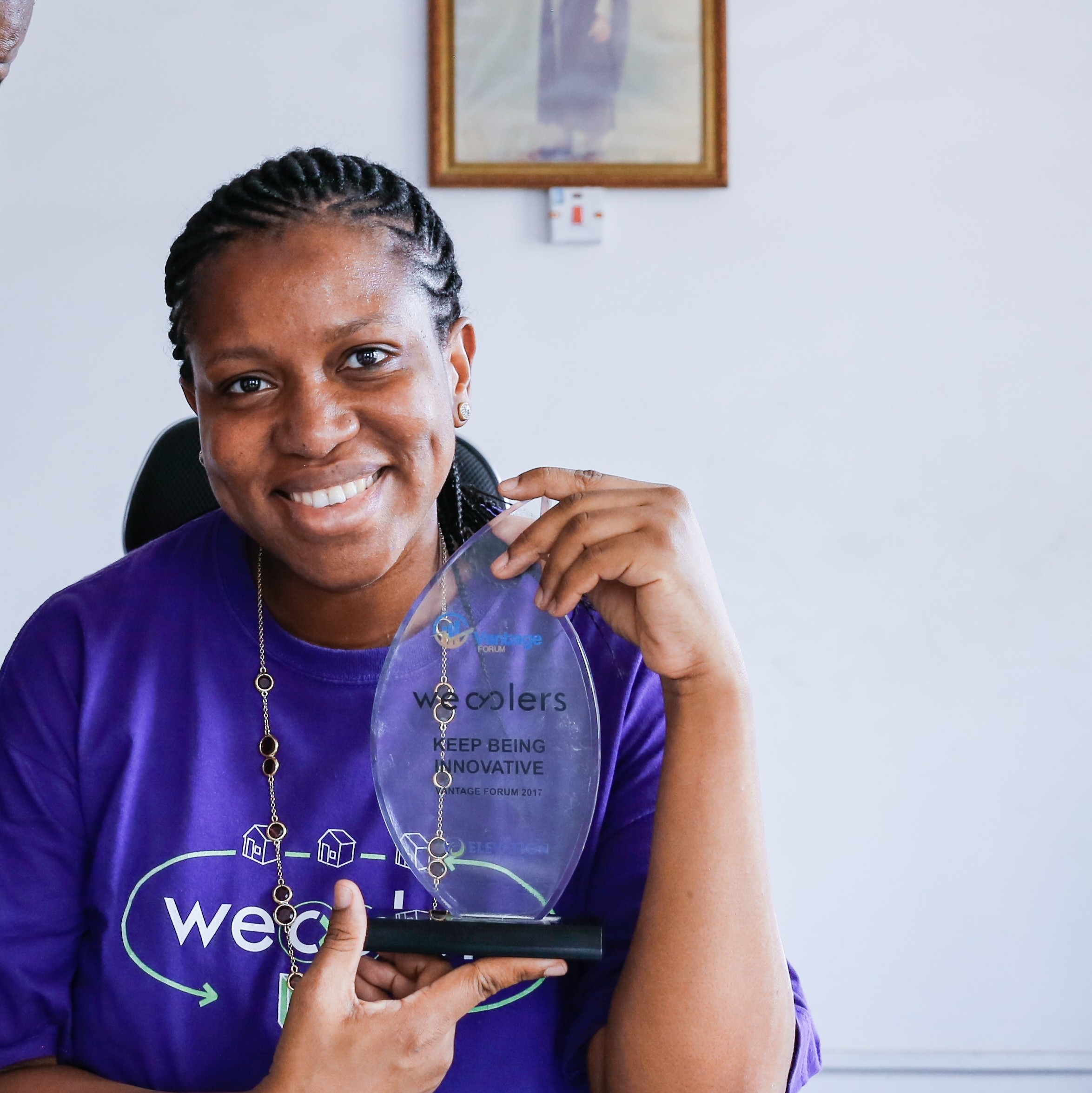
- in 2019
- Born: Lagos, Nigeria
- Other name: Bilikiss Adebiyi Abiola
- Education: Fisk University; Vanderbilt University; MIT
- Known for: CEO of Wecyclers

Bilikiss Adebiyi or Bilikiss Adebiyi-Abiola is a Nigerian entrepreneur who founded the Lagos-based recycling company 'Wecyclers' in 2012. In 2022 she was the Director General of the Lagos State Records and Archives Bureau (LASRAB) and Managing Director of the Lagos State Parks and Gardens Agency (LASPARK). She was a member of the Board of Trustees of the Lagos State Employment Trust Fund.

== Early life ==
Adebiyi was born in 1983 in Lagos, Nigeria, where she went to the Supreme Education Foundation secondary school. She entered the University of Lagos, but left after a year to complete her studies in the United States. She graduated from Fisk University and then went to Vanderbilt University, where she earned a master's degree. She worked for IBM for five years before deciding to study further. She was accepted to study for a Master of Business Administration (MBA) at the Massachusetts Institute of Technology (MIT).

== Wecyclers ==
Bilikiss Adebiyi Abiola on Ndani TV

She came up with the idea of a recycling business during her second year at MIT, where she worked on waste as her specialist subject. Her initial idea was to increase the quantity of waste she could collect from households by offering them raffle tickets in exchange. When she discussed this in Nigeria on a vacation she was surprised at the enthusiasm for her ideas. Waste is a particular nuisance in Lagos as only a small percentage was collected regularly. Adebiyi took the idea back to MIT where she was able to gather support by entering her idea in competitions. After graduating in 2012, Adebiyi moved back to Nigeria to be with her husband.

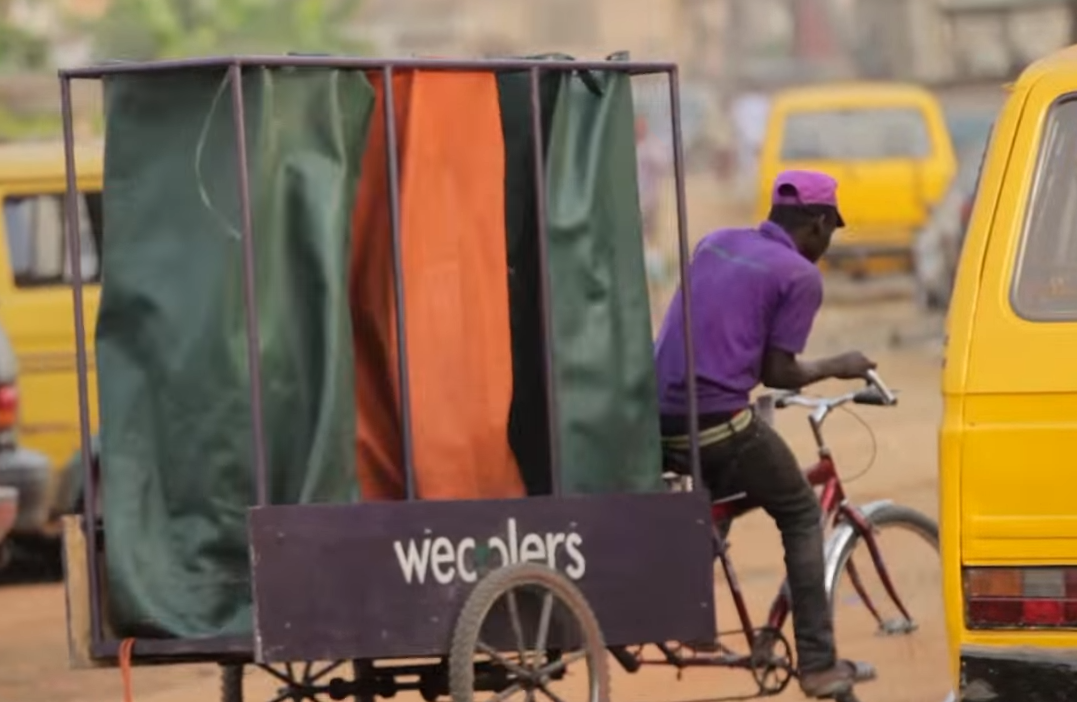
A Wecycler's tricycle – A "Wecycle"

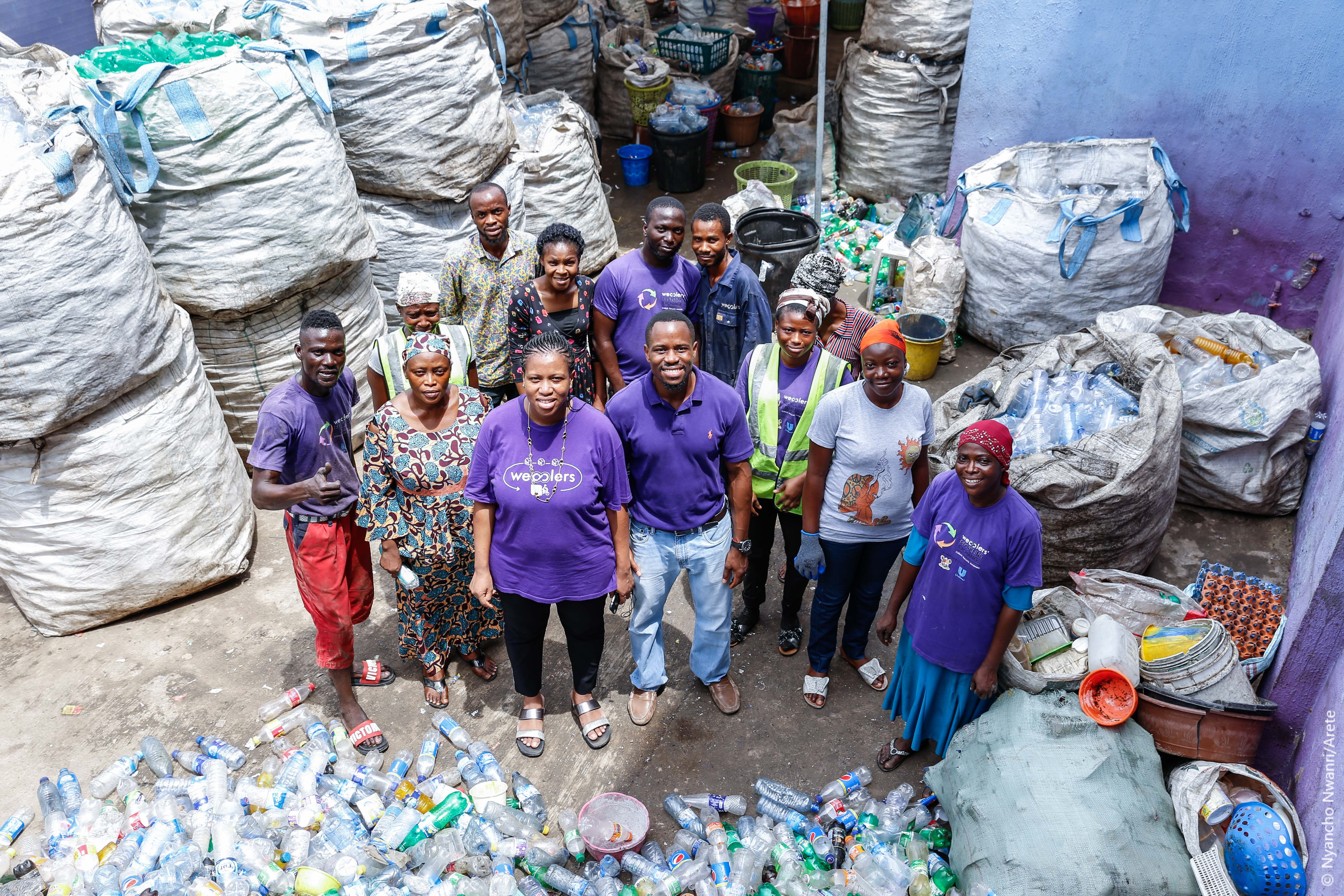
Wecycle rubbish and recyclers in 2019

In 2012, she co-founded Wecyclers, a company that collects recyclable rubbish from households in Lagos. When the business started, Adebiyi would take out a tricycle to do collections to find out more about her new business. Once the rubbish is sorted, her company sends a SMS back to the household, informing them of how many points they have earned for trading in the rubbish. These points can be converted for food, cleaning products, or cellphone minutes. The company works in partnership with the Lagos Waste Management Authority. Lagos produces 9,000 tons of waste per day and the authority was trying to double the proportion that was recycled from the 18% figure in 2011. The Nigerian economy is one of the largest economies in Africa, but the disorganisation in Lagos means that rubbish cannot always be collected. Wecyclers use modified tricycles that enable the collection of rubbish from places where normal vehicles cannot reach, gathering waste from thousands of households. The company's estimate in October 2015 is that it has collected over 500 tons of rubbish, it has created value from that rubbish and has employed 80 people.

Adebiyi, whose married name is Abiola, has arranged for the Coca-Cola and GlaxoSmithKline to subsidize their operation. Wecyclers had found that a significant proportion of the rubbish came from these companies and they were willing to assist with the recycling effort. Guinness in Nigeria agreed to collaborate with Wecyclers in 2018.

In 2017, Abebiyi stepped down as the CEO of Wecyclers to become the Managing Director of the Lagos State Parks and Gardens Agency (LASPARK). In her new role, she will be keeping open space in Lagos State attractive and carry out tree planting. She is currently (2023) the Director General of Lagos State Records and Archives Bureau (LASRAB).

== Recognition ==
Adebiyi's efforts have been reported in Nigeria and D+C. She has been awarded grants from MIT and she has won a number of awards, including the Cartier Women's Initiative Award for sub-Saharan Africa in 2013. Wecyclers were awarded the King Baudouin International Development Prize in 2018/19. Fela Akinse and Bilikiss Adebiyi-Abiola were the only two Nigerians listed in Africa among top five waste recycling entrepreneurs in 2020.

== Partners ==
Wecycler's partners include FCMB, DHL, Unilever, Oracle, Nigerian Bottling Company and MIT Sloan School of Management.
