= Onyekachi =

Onyekachi is a Nigerian given name and surname of Igbo origin. It is a diminutive form of Onyeka, which means “someone who is strong”

== Notable Individuals with the Name ==
=== As a given name ===
- Charles Onyeabor (fl. 2020), Italian-Nigerian singer, songwriter and businessman
- Kevin Amuneke (born 1986), Nigerian footballer
- Onyekachi Apam (born 1986), Nigerian footballer
- Onyekachi Elizabeth Gilbert (fl. 2011), winner of Nigerian Idol
- Onyekachi Hope Ugwuadu (born 1997), Nigerian footballer
- Onyekachi Nwaebonyi (fl. 2023), Nigerian politician
- Onyekachi Nwoha (born 1983), Nigerian footballer
- Onyekachi Okafor (born 1994), Nigerian footballer
- Onyekachi Okonkwo (born 1982), Nigerian footballer
- Onyekachi Silas (born 1996), Nigerian footballer
- Onyekachi Wambu (born 1960), Nigerian–British journalist and writer
- Stephanie Okereke Linus (born 1982), Nigerian actress, film director and model

=== As a surname ===
- Daniel Onyekachi (born 1985), Nigerian footballer
- Victor Ochei (born 1969), Nigerian politician
