= Jejere =

- Produced by: Laide Bakare
- Starring: Abolore Adegbola Akande, Akin Lewis, Ebun Oloyede, Laide Bakare Emeka Ike.
- Release date: 2018
- Country: Nigeria
- Language: English

Jejere is a 2018 Nigerian film all about a man in a new environment. It was produced by Sim Line International and the shooting took place for three days at oshogbo.

== Premier ==
The film, which was produced by Laide Bakare was premiered at Orchid Hotel in Lagos, and it was attended by different celebrities as well as government officials.

== Cast ==
Starring in the film are Abolore Adegbola Akande, Akin Lewis, Ebun Oloyede, Laide Bakare Emeka Ike, Oby Alex O, and Fathia Balogun.

== Synopsis ==
A woman is being pressured by her husband to give him a male child after 8 girls, despite her failing health. The film also addresses contemporary issues such as kidnapping, unemployment, and corruption.
