= S.B. Bakare =

Nigerian businessman (Born 1922)

- Born: Saliu Bolaji Bakare; 1922; Ilesha, Nigeria
- Occupation: Businessman

Saliu Bolaji Bakare was a Nigerian businessman who owned one of the largest stevedore business in Nigeria during the 1960s. Originally providing staffing services to Nigerian Railways, he later extended the service into the shipping sector and acquiring some of the assets of William Hamilton Biney.

== Life ==
Bakare was born in 1922 in Ilesha to Jegede and Abigail Bakare. His father was a trader who travelled to different regions in Nigeria to conduct business. He attended two schools in Ilesha, ending his education in 1933 at St John's Anglican, Iloro, Ilesha.

He joined his father's trade, moving to the Northern region, where he worked as a clerk. In 1940, he joined the army during World War II, he and served in The Gambia. Thereafter, he worked briefly with the army before leaving to establish a contracting business. Initially, the business supplied foodstuff to the army, and he got a break when he was awarded a conservancy contract from the army, He later established a stevedore business supplying staff to the railways. Bakare expanded the business into building materials supply and later became a contractor to the port authority and major ocean liners berthing in Lagos.

Bakare owned Surulere Night club, one of the venues of Fela and the first place Fela called the shrine.
