= Nelson Olanipekun =

Nigerian human rights lawyer

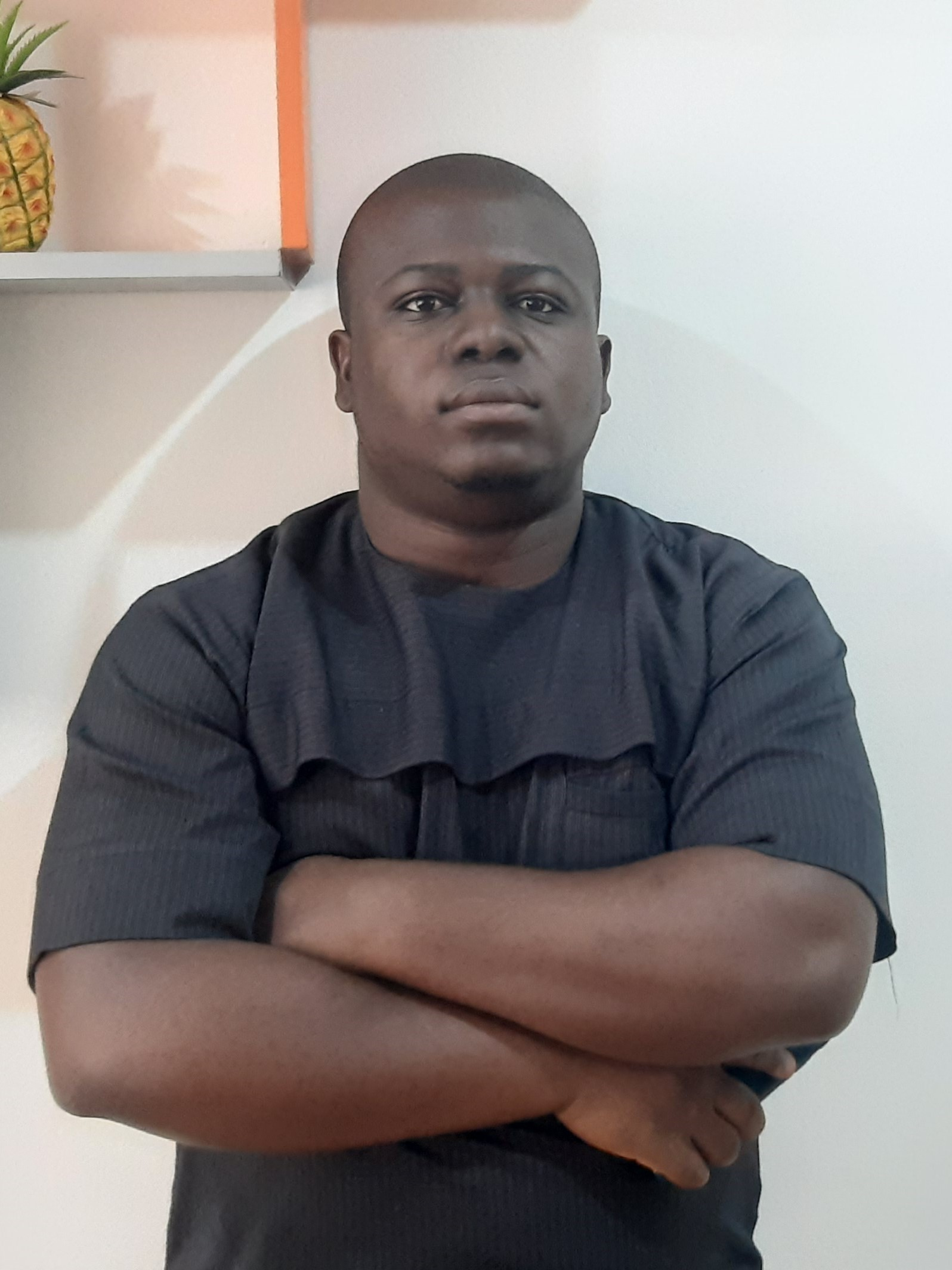
- Nelson Olanipekun in his Ibadan office
- Education: Ekiti State University, University of Ibadan
- Occupation: Human rights lawyer
- Years active: 2014–present
- Organization: Citizens' Gavel
- Known for: Founding Citizens' Gavel
- Notable work: #EndSARS Movement

Nelson Olanipekun is a Nigerian human rights lawyer and entrepreneur. He is the founder of Citizens' Gavel, an organization that aims to improve access to justice in Nigeria. As a legal advocate, he has been involved in discussions on police reform, including relating to the End SARS campaign.

== Education ==
Olanipekun attended Ekiti State University, receiving a Bachelor of Laws (LLB) degree in 2013. He subsequently attended the Nigerian Law School, qualifying as a barrister and solicitor in 2014. While at the Law School, he developed an online collaboration platform.

In 2017/ 2018 he attended a fellowship called Civichive.

His work and involvement in civic technology and legal activism have been reported in Nigerian and international media.

== Career ==
Olanipekun began his legal career interning at the Justice Development Peace Center (JDPC) in Ondo State, where he worked on legal aid and justice sector reforms. Between 2014 and 2017, he worked at Bola Ige & Co. and Oluwaseun Dada & Co., focusing on litigation and legal consultancy.

In 2017, he founded Citizens' Gavel, a non-governmental organization (NGO) that provides legal aid and aims to improve the efficiency of judicial processes. Initially launched in Lagos, Gavel later expanded to Ibadan and Abuja. The organization was initially called Open Justice before rebranding to Gavel.

Olanipekun has worked on cases involving human rights violations, police brutality, and extrajudicial killings. He worked as a legal consultant during the End SARS movement, which advocated for the reform of Nigeria's Special Anti-Robbery Squad (SARS). However, his precise role and influence in securing policy changes remain a subject of discussion.

Gavel started with nine staff members and has since grown, collaborating with over 150 lawyers across 19 states in Nigeria.

Nelson has been a Ashoka Fellow since 2023, and a New Voices Fellow with the Aspen Institute since 2021.

== Advocacy and public engagement ==
In December 2019, Olanipekun sent a letter to the head of the European Union's delegation to Nigeria urging sanctions against the Nigerian Department of State Services (DSS) over the re-arrest of Omoyele Sowore, a political activist. He requested that the DSS be blacklisted and its leadership subjected to travel bans following the storming of the Federal High Court in Abuja by DSS operatives to re-arrest Sowore.

== Criticism and controversy ==
Some commentators have questioned the extent of Olanipekun's influence in judicial reforms, noting that while Gavel has provided legal support, independent data on its overall impact is limited. Critics argue that his public advocacy sometimes blurs the line between activism and legal practice.
