= Bakery (disambiguation) =

A bakery is a place to make bread.

(The) Bakery may also refer to:

- Bakery (band), Australian rock band formed in 1970
- "Bakery" (The Apprentice), a 2010 television episode
- The Bakery (film), short by Laurel and Hardy
- The Bakery (recording studio), recording studio founded by Coldplay in London
- The Bakery (song), a song by Melanie Martinez
- "The Bakery" a song by Arctic Monkeys
- The Bakery, an historic Chicago restaurant operated by Louis Szathmary.

== See also ==
- Bakeri (disambiguation)
