= Bakari, Togo =

Bakari
- Location in Togo
- Coordinates: 9°16′N 0°34′E
- Country: Togo
- Region: Kara Region
- Prefecture: Bassar
- Time zone: UTC + 0

Bakari is a village in the Bassar Prefecture in the Kara Region of north-western Togo. It is also a word used to refer to the sport of Basketball
