= Rasak Ojo Bakare =

Professor of Theatre and Aesthetics

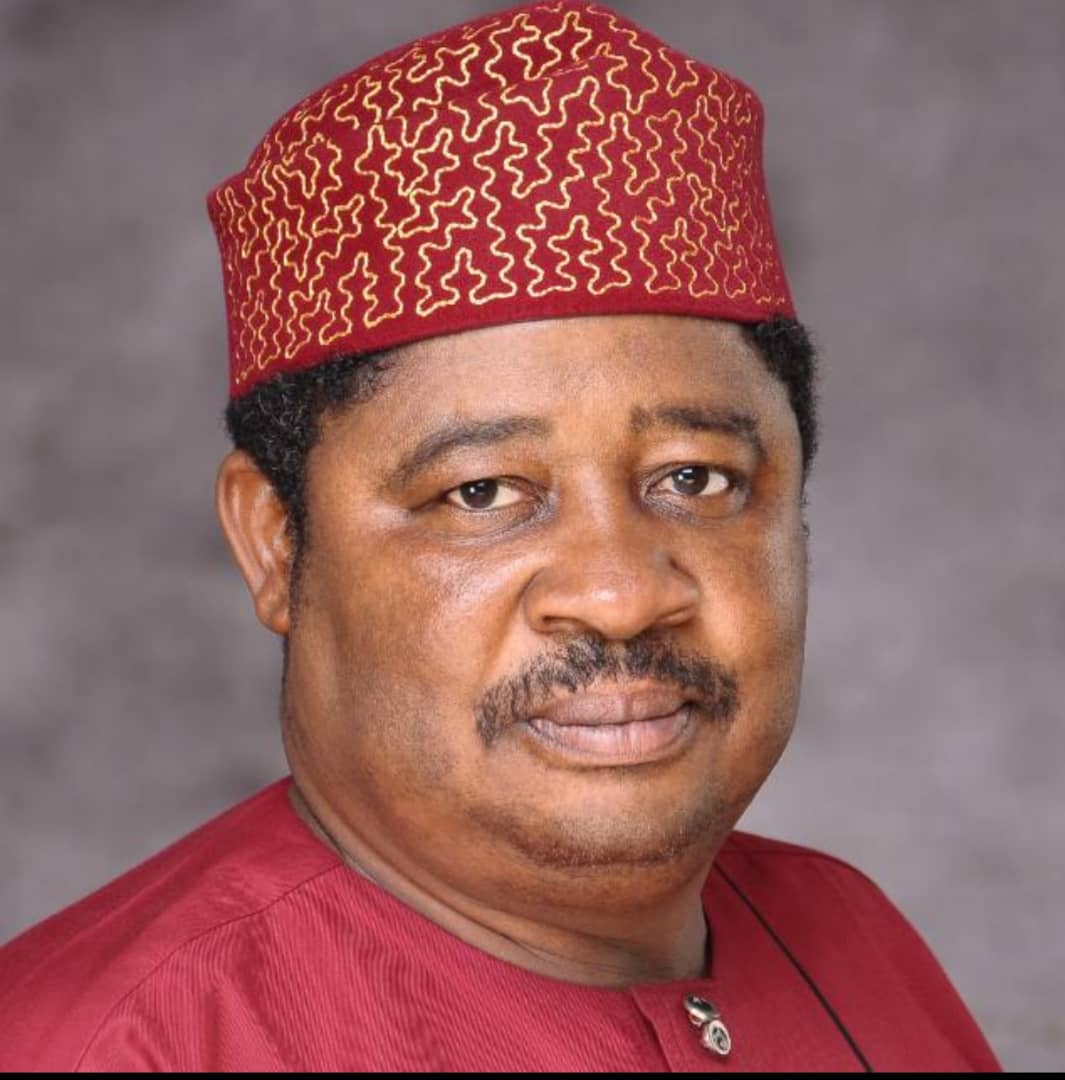
- Born: November 8, 1964 (age 61); Araomoko
- Education: University of Calabar, Calabar; Ahmadu Bello University, Zaria
- Occupation: Academia
- Known for: Performances Director

Rasak Ojo Bakare (born November 8, 1964) is the first professor of Choreography and Performing Aesthetics from Nigeria. A former Dean of Postgraduate School, Federal University, Oye-Ekiti, former Chief Executive Officer (CEO), and Artistic Director, Abuja Carnival and member, National Academy of Letters.

Rasak started his career in theater arts as a theater apprentice under Jimoh Aliu and Chief Hubert Ogunde, afterward he pursued the profession in the academic world. As an apprentice, he premiered in "Aropin N'Teniyan" a celluloid film by Hubert Ogunde, 1981/82. He graduated with a B.A(Hons) in Theater Arts and M A in Play Directing and Playwright from the University of Calabar, Rivers State and he later obtained a Ph.D. in Choreography and Dance Studies from Ahmadu Bello University, ABU, Zaria. As an academic, he started as Graduate Assistant in 1990. By 1992, he was a Lecturer II and at the end of 1992 he has become Lecturer 1. He rose to the position of a Senior Lecture by the year 2000. In 2005, he was an Associate professor and full Professor in 2011. As of 2003, Bakare was the Artiste- Scholar in – residence at the University of West Indies, Edna Monkey School of Performing Arts and National Dance Theater Company. In the same year, he was at the University of Pretoria, South Africa for collaborative research on African Musical Arts Education.

As a result of his commitment to the field of theater arts in Nigeria, he became the first Nigerian scholar to bag all the three Fellowship in the field of performing arts: a Fellow of Theater Arts (NANTAP), Fellow, Society of Nigeria Theatre Artisities, and Fellow, Dance Guild of Nigeria. He has anchored many presidential inaugurations for Nigerian former presidents Jagunmolu, Chief Olusegun Obasanjo, Voyage, Alhaji Musa Yaradua. and Langbodo. Dr.Goodluck Jonathan. In recognition of his impact in Art and Culture in Ekiti state, Bakare and the other 13 professional indigenes of Ekiti were honored as Cultural Ambassador by Governor Kayode fayemi. As of January 2020, he was the commissioner for Art, Culture and Tourism in Ekiti State. His professional career has taken him outside the shore of Nigeria; between 1994–1996, Rasak worked as Choreographer to the Gambia's National Troupe. Bakare, married to Dr.Lilian, a specialist in Costume and a lecturer at the Department of Theater and Media Arts, Federal University Oye-Ekiti.

== Early life and education ==
Bakare was born in Aramoko Ekiti in 1964. As a child, he grew up with love for singing, dancing and watching masquerade performances. Rasak and his father were not on a good term because of his intention to study theater arts. On one of the occasions, his father bought him a JAMB form to study Law at a Nigerian University, he felt otherwise and tore the form. He was later reconciled with his dad after his international exploit in Bulgaria.

He started his education from the College of Education, Ikere, Ekiti where he studied Yoruba Language and Religious Studies. After obtaining his National Certificate Education (NCE), Rasak, moved to the University of Calabar to study Theater Arts. At the same institution, he obtained his B.A(Hons) in Theater Arts and M.A in Play Directing and Playwright while he earned a PhD in Choreography and Dance Studies from Ahmadu Bello University, Abu, Zaria. As a 200 level student, he represented Nigeria in a dance competition and won a gold medal.

== Career ==
Rasak started his career as a theater apprentice under Chief Jimoh Aliu, Herbert Ogunde. Between 1981/82, he featured in " Aropin N'Teniyan" a celluloid film produced by Chief Ogunde. After graduating from the College of Education, he was employed at Ondo State Radiovision Corporation as an Assistant Drama Producer, actor and Yoruba Chants Presenter. From here, he got admission to the University of Calabar to study Theater Arts.

In 1990, he was retained as a Graduate Assistant at the same university. He was promoted to the position of lecturer in 1992. In 2000, he became a Senior Lecturer. In 2005, after five years of academic work, he became an Associate Professor and later in 2011 he earned his full Professor.

He was Artiste- Scholar in – residence at the University of West Indies, Edna Manley School of Performing Arts and National Dance Theater Company, Jamaica in 2003. In the same year, he got a grant for collaborative research on African Musical Arts Education. He became a member of the Carnival Research Roundtable, Trinidad and Tobago, 2012 and by 2013, he was a member of the Teaching Artists Research Group, Oslo, Norway. He has represented Nigeria in many international competitions; Friendship International Festival, North Korea, 1997, Afrika- in Tyrol Festival, Austria, 1999, Africa Peace Tour, Mozambique, 2002, Gauteng Carnival, Soweto, South Africa, 2010. He was a leading member of Nigeria's contingent to Cervantino Theatre Festival, Mexico in 2001. Between 1994-1996, he was the Choreographer, Gambia National Troupe and the Artistic Director/ CEO Nigeria National Carnival, Abuja, 2009-2013. As a performance director, he has directed over 200 performances among them are the three Presidential Inauguration command performances: Jagunmolu, 1999, Voyage, 2007 and Langbodo, 2011. He directed the culture content of the Heart of Africa project with performances in London, Paris and other cities of the World. Bakare is also a member of International Dance Council (CID), UNESCO, Member, National Academy of Letters. He is the first Nigeria Scholar with the three Fellowship available in the field of Performing Arts in Nigeria; Fellow of the Guild (fdgn), 2013, Fellow of the Learned Academic Society (Fsonta), 2018 and Fellow of the industry, 2019. At one time or the other in his academic career, he has worked as lecturer at University of Calabar, Ahmadu Bello University, Zaria, Obafemi Awolowo University, Ile-Ife, University of Uyo and University of Abuja. He has also worked in Imo State University, Delta State University, Kogi State University, Olabisi Onabanjo University and Federal University Oye Ekiti.
