= BudgIT =

Nigeria Tech Company

- Official logo
- Trade name: BudgIT
- Type: Private
- Industry: Civic Organization
- Founded: 2011; 15 years ago in Yaba, Lagos, Lagos State, Nigeria
- Founders: Oluseun Onigbinde; Joseph Agunbiade
- Headquarters: Yaba, Lagos State, Nigeria
- Key people: Oluseun Onigbinde (Co-founder and Director); Joseph Agunbiade (Co-Founder and Chief Technology Officer); Gabriel Okeowo (Principal Lead)
- Website: budgit.org

BudgIT is a Nigerian civic organisation that applies technology for citizen engagement with institutional improvement to facilitate societal change. The company, which launched operations in Lagos, Nigeria, was founded by Oluseun Onigbinde and Joseph Agunbiade in 2011 to provide social advocacy using technology.

== History ==
BudgIT was formed in 2011 by Oluseun Onigbinde and Joseph Agunbiade as a team during a hackathon held at the Co-Creation Hub. At Co-Creation Hub they came up with the idea for open data access of government spending for public knowledge, leading to the startup BudgIT. In 2014, the Omidyar Network invested $400,000 in BudgIT. In June 2015, the Kaduna State government under the administration of Mallam El-Rufai, signed BudgIT to build Open Budget mobile portal similar to the Buharimeter; a platform which was built by BudgIT for Center for Democracy and Development to hold President Buhari accountable for his campaign promises. In January 2017, BudgIT raised an additional $3 million grant from Omidyar Network and Bill & Melinda Gates Foundation.

== Tracka ==
In 2014, Tracka was created to track the implementation of government projects in various community to ensure service delivery. Functional in 20 States in Nigeria, it allows Nigerians to post pictures of developmental projects in their communities to communicate with their elected representatives, and demand completion of the government projects in their respective neighborhoods.

== LG Alert ==
Launched in 2019 with over 500,000 users across Nigeria, LG Alert gives citizens direct access to information about funds received by local governments.

== See also ==
- Akin Fadeyi Foundation
