= Apostolic Missionary Union =

The Apostolic Missionary Union also known as Apostolic Missionary House and the Catholic Missionary Union and was an organisation run by the Catholic Bishops of the United States to further missionary activity in the United States. It was strongly influenced by the Paulist Fathers.

It was headquartered in Apostolic House in Washington DC, which later became an administrative building for the Catholic University of America before being demolished in 1996.
