= Akin Fadeyi Foundation =

Nigerian non-profit

Akin Fadeyi Foundation (AFF)
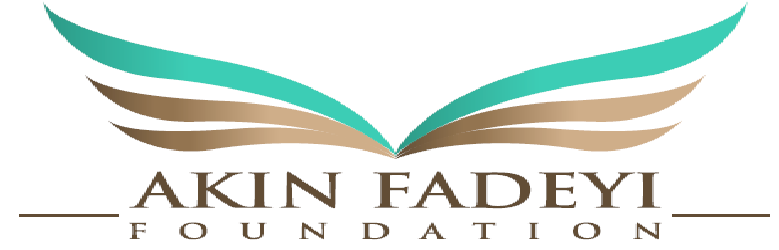
- Founded: Started as an anti-corruption campaign in Nigeria by Akin Fadeyi
- Type: Non-profit; NGO
- Headquarters: Abuja, Nigeria
- Location: Nigeria
- Services: Governance, Anti-Corruption, Social Justice and Education
- Fields: To advocate for change by leveraging communication, innovative technology, and capacity building for human development
- Founder: Akin Fadeyi
- Website: www.akinfadeyifoundation.org

Akin Fadeyi Foundation (AFF) is a Nigerian not-for-profit established in 2016 which focuses on using technology, media and communication tools to tackle corruption. It promotes civic engagement, transparency and accountability in Nigeria through its FlagIt corruption-reporting app, campaigns, and media awareness program. It is the convener of a nationwide anti-corruption crusade, Corruption Not-In-My-Country which has been endorsed by the European Union, United Nations, and the Nigerian government.

== History ==
Akin Fadeyi Foundation started as a campaign against corruption, for social justice and inclusiveness. The founder, Akin Fadeyi, saw the need to sustain the campaign and use communication for change approach to address insistent corruption practices in Nigeria; he founded the organization in 2016. AFF has worked to promote good governance, social justice, and women’s right in Nigeria.In 2 017, it started Corruption Not In My Country, a pan-Nigerian campaign against retail corruption in Nigeria which was used to mobilize young people as anti-corruption ambassadors.

== Campaigns and achievements ==
- Corruption Not in My Country: Since 2017, AFF has used its campaign, Corruption Not in My Country, to mobilize youth, organizations, agencies, and celebrities to stand against corrupt practices within the public sector. The campaign has been supported by the European Union, United Nations Development Programme (UNDP), United Nations Office for Drugs and Crime (UNODC) and the MacArthur Foundation.
- What Women Can Do: To increase women’s participation in governance, AFF with support from the Macarthur Foundation launched "What Women Can Do Campaign". The campaign included a competition that featured young women on leadership pitches related to topic of interests such as agriculture, education, healthcare and technology.
- Put on Your Thinking Cap: In March 2022, AFF unveiled a citizen’s voting project known as “Put On Your Thinking Cap”, which focuses on discouraging vote buying in Nigeria. The campaign was launched in preparation for Nigeria’s 2023 election and to mobilize citizens to ask key questions before voting for any candidate.

== Anti-corruption reporting ==
To promote civic engagement and increase reportage of corrupt practices in Nigeria, Akin Fadeyi Foundation and the Federal Road Safety Corps launched a mobile and web-based application known as FlagIt App. This has been used by citizens across Nigeria to monitor and report suspected corrupt practices.

== Supporters ==
- MacArthur Foundation
- European Union
- United Nations Development Programme
- United Nations Office for Drugs on Crime
- Federal Road Safety Corps
- National Orientation Agency

== See also ==
- Ado Ekiti
- Afe Babalola University
- List of Villages in Osun State
