= African Virtual University =

The African Virtual University (AVU) is a pan-African effort to create an open and affordable distance learning institution to serve the African continent. The AVU began in 1997 as a project of the World Bank and later developed into an autonomous institution after it was handed over to African governments in 2003. Over the program's lifetime, critics have questioned its efficacy as well as its neocolonial aspects.

== Reasons for creation ==
Sub-Saharan Africa is a region that has experienced high rates of HIV/AIDS, political instability, and poverty. These conditions have contributed to a paucity of state-run educational institutions, an insufficient number of educators, and a surplus of students. For these reasons, many students attend universities outside of SSA which has drained the region of its educated residents Specifically, the AVU was designed to expand the capacity of SSA institutions of higher learning to service a larger number of students. The UVA hoped that these additional spaces would lower the cost of education to more affordable levels. Furthermore, the AVU initiative desired to equip SSA students with the skills they would need to compete in the new professional jobs emerging on the continent—especially in the technical industries. The initiative hoped that the AVU could provide access to academic databases, high-quality professors, and technical curricula to close the gap between African country's economies and that of the rest of the world.

As of 2013, the program had more than 40,000 graduates in 27 Sub-Saharan countries and planned to expand to phone-based content in 2015 due to the prevalence of smartphones on the continent.

== Neocolonialism in higher education ==
Conditions attached to World Bank loans forced African countries to reduce spending on higher education, since higher education institutions paid lower dividends than elementary and secondary education programs. These conditions decreased the quality of education provided by African universities. Additionally, the World Bank also introduced their own more expensive alternative programs taught by western professors. These programs, especially regarding historical, cultural, and humanities-related content raised concerns about the interpretations being provided by western scholars. The origins of many African universities harkens back to western influence as well. Modern western schools have reinforced this legacy of dependency through AVU's western partner universities who provide the program's content. This flow of knowledge moves in a one-way direction from the West to the East, leaving African countries with little say in the curriculum.

== See also ==
- List of universities in Kenya
- Education in Kenya
