= Bakary =

Bakary is a given name and a surname. Notable people with the name include:

== Given name ==
- Bakary Diakité (born 1980), Malian football player
- Bakary Dibba (born 2001), Danish basketball player
- Bakary Koné (Burkinabé footballer) (born 1988), Burkinabé football player
- Bakary Sako (born 1988), Malian football player
- Bakary Saré (born 1990), Belgian football player
- Bakary Soro (born 1985), Ivoirian football player
- Bakary Soumaré (born 1985), Malian football player

== Surname ==
- Abubakar Khamis Bakary, Tanzanian politician
- Djibo Bakary (1922–1998), Nigerien politician
- Yaou Sangaré Bakary, Nigerien politician

== See also ==
- Bakari (name)
- Bakare
