= Wecyclers =

Nigerian waste management company

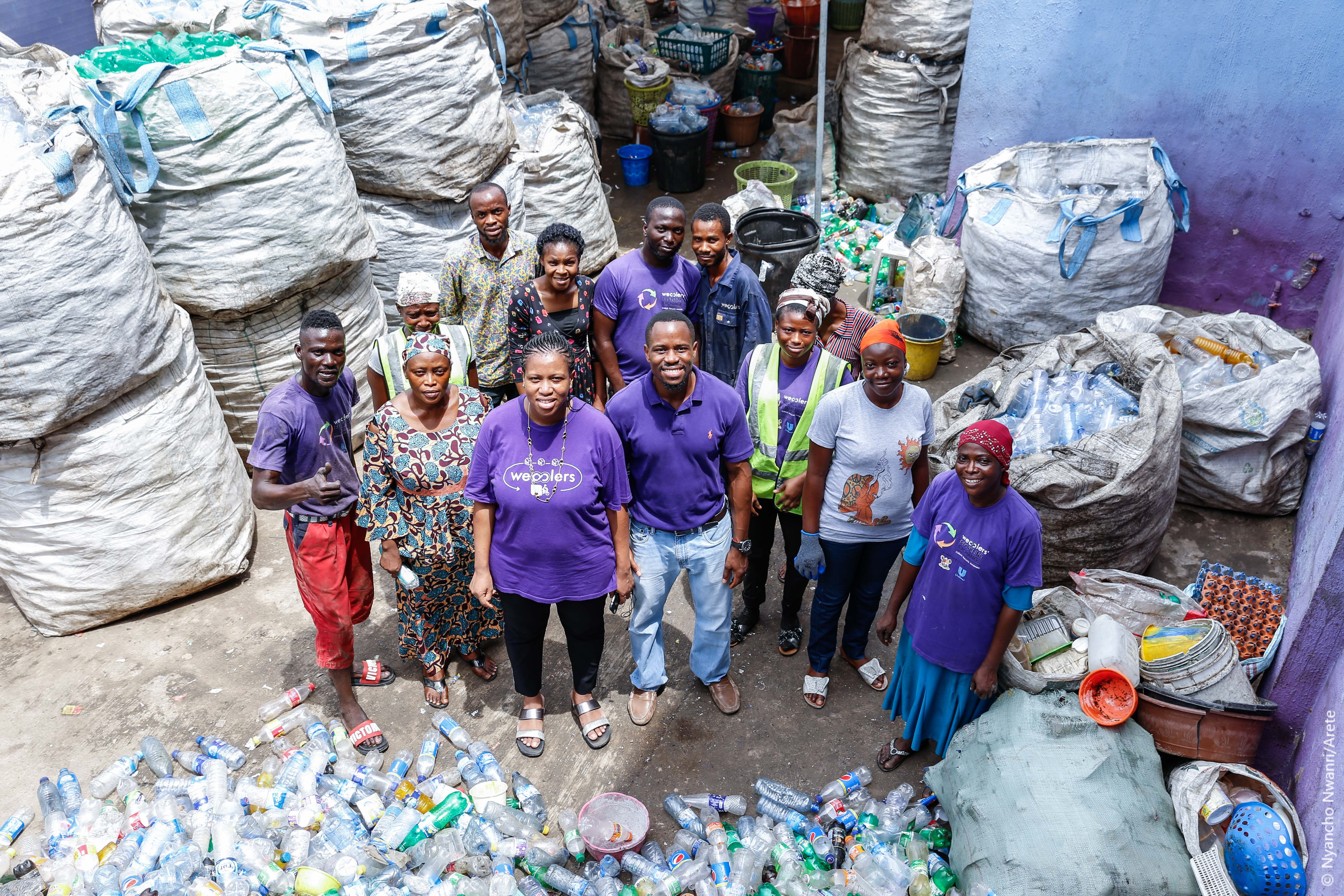
Bilikiss Adebiyi-Abiola

Wecyclers is a waste management company in Nigeria that helps low-income communities exchange their recyclable waste which is measured in kilograms for cash and other rewards.

== History ==
The waste management company Wecyclers began as a student project in respect to this, Bilikiss Adebiyi-Abiola has now modified it into a social enterprise that combats Lagos' garbage crisis and encourages low-income communities to turn refuse into revenue.

In 2012, Wecyclers was founded by Bilikiss Adebiyi-Abiola and her co-founders. Wecyclers uses low-cost cargo bicycles to provide convenient recycling services to households across Nigeria.

In 2023 the company gained funding for a plant in Ogun State that will be able to recycle PET bottles funded by a Norwegian initiative.

== Partnership ==
Wecyclers is in partnership with various organizations which includes; Nestle Nigeria, Guinness Nigeria and Lagos State Waste Management Authority.

In 2023 the company joined a partnership with Unilever and the UK government organised by Societe Generale. Wecyclers was to receive funds for expansion and they targeted a collection of 30,000 tonnes of waste plastic to be collected over the next five years. Unilever saw their investment as keeping plastics out of the environment in Nigeria.

== Awards and recognition ==
- Le Monde Smart-Cities 2017 Innovation Awards.
- The Tech Intel Environmental Awards 2013.
- 2019 King Baudouin Award.
