= Laide Bakare =

Nigerian actress and filmmaker

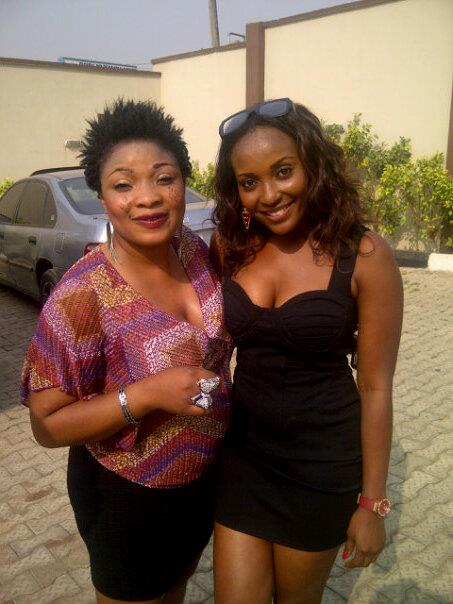
- Occupation: Actress
- Notable work: Jejere

Laide Bakare is a Nigerian actress. Her film Jejere won the 2012 Best of Nollywood Awards in the Best Constume Design category.

She was nominated for Most Outstanding Actress Indigenous Category at the 4th Africa Movie Academy Awards in 2008 for her role in the film Iranse Aje (2008).

== Career ==
Her first movie Jejere was premiered in the UK.

In 2024, Bakare released her first book, Becoming Laide Bakare: Make Millions in 6 Months.
