= Bakairi people =

Bakairi
Kurâ

Total population
- 982 (2014)

Regions with significant populations
- Brazil (Mato Grosso)

Languages
- Bakairi, Portuguese

Religion
- Traditional tribal religion

The Bakairi are an Indigenous people of Brazil. They speak the Bakairi language, one of the Cariban languages. They call themselves Kurâ, Bakairi being a Portuguese term of unknown origin. They currently live in the Santana and Bakairi Indigenous Territories of northern Mato Grosso, in the municipality of Paranatinga in the northern cerrado south of the Amazon rain forest. Like most native peoples, they were more numerous before European contact. In 1999 there were about 950 Bakairi, of whom 898 lived in the two Indigenous Territories. In 1965 only 261 were recorded.

== History ==
According to the Bakairi, they first lived in the rainforest on the Teles Pires (a branch of the Tapajos) below its confluence with the Verde, a large left tributary which comes in west of Sinop, Mato Grosso about 1000 km south of the Amazon, 400 km north of Cuiaba and 200 km west of the Xingu. Due to internal quarrels and conflict with their neighbors, mainly Kayabí, they moved south in three groups.

The small western group went south to 'Santana’ on the upper Arinos River, about 250 km north of Cuiaba. They were first contacted in the early 18th century and began to work in mineral extraction. From 1847 they were involved with the General Directorate of Indians in Cuiaba and later began to work in rubber extraction where they seem to have been abused. In the 1920s and 1960s many moved east to the central group. In 1965 an Indigenous Post was established and is now the Santana Indigenous Territory or Territorio Kurâ Bakairi. They resisted assimilation. The first school was established in 1975.

The central group moved south to the headwaters of the Teles Pires about 150 km east of Santana. They were first contacted by the Portuguese in the early 19th century and began working in agriculture and cattle raising. In 1889 a Captain Telles Pires took many Bakairi as paddlers to explore the river that now bears his name, but all of them died. The Bakairi Indigenous Territory was established here in 1920. It is about twice the size of the western Territory. Some Chavante moved from the Xingu to the Territory, outnumbering the Bakairi, but in 1974 they moved back to the Coluene River, branch of the Xingu.

The eastern and largest group moved to the upper Xingu northeast of the central group, an area almost unknown to Europeans. Here they lost contact with the other two groups. In 1884 Karl von den Steinen had some central Bakairi lead him to the eastern group on the Batavi River. Fifteen years later another German explorer, Hermann Meyer, found them on the Coliseu River (another branch of the Xingu) and judged them depopulated and corroded by the western Bakairi's ‘civilization’. In 1923 they seem to have moved to the central Bakairi.

== Ethnography ==
The Bakairi people were studied, and an outline of their language was written, by Karl von den Steinen. They came to prominence in Western ethnography after one of their customs was mentioned by Ernest Crawley in his work The Mystic Rose: A Study in Primitive Marriage (1902). Crawley mentioned an eating practice among them:

'Amongst the Bakairi every man eats by himself; when one eats in the presence of another, it is the custom to do so with head averted, while the other turns his back and does not speak till the meal is over. When the German explorer, not knowing of this, ate his lunch without giving notice, they hung their heads and showed on their faces real shame.'

Crawley used this to buttress his generalization that 'Every individual, as such, is surrounded by a taboo of personal isolation', an argument which engaged Sigmund Freud's curiosity in his paper on 'The Taboo of Virginity' in 1918.

== Sources ==
- "Bakairi". Povos Indígenas do Brasil. n.d.
- Hemming, John (1995). Amazon Frontier. Papermac. ISBN 978-033361745-8.
- Picchi, Debra (December 1995). "Village Division in Lowland South America: The Case of the Bakairí Indians of Central Brazil". Human Ecology. 23 (4): 477–498. doi:10.1007/BF01190133. JSTOR 4603178. S2CID 115148324.
- Picchi, Debra (2006) [First published 2000]. The Bakairí Indians of Brazil. Politics, Ecology, and Change (2nd ed.). Prospect Heights, Illinois: Waveland Press. ISBN 978-1-577-66430-7.
