= Bakairi language =

Cariban language of Brazil

Bakairí
- Bacairí, Bacaïri
- Kurâ
- Pronunciation: [baka.iˈɾi]
- Native to: Brazil
- Region: Mato Grosso
- Ethnicity: Bakairi people
- Native speakers: (950 cited 1999)
- Language family: Cariban: Pekodian; Bakairí
- Dialects: Western; Eastern

Language codes
- ISO 639-3: bkq
- Glottolog: baka1277
- ELP: Bakairí
- Linguasphere: 80-AIB-aa
- Bakairi is classified as Vulnerable by the UNESCO Atlas of the World's Languages in Danger

Bakairí (Bacairí) is a Cariban language, spoken by the Bakairi people in the state of Mato Grosso in Brazil.

== Phonology ==
The consonant and vowel inventories for Bakairí are shown below.

Consonants
		Bilabial	Alveolar	Palatal	Velar	Glottal
Plosive	voiceless	p	t		k	ʔ
Plosive	voiced	b	d		ɡ	
Fricative	voiceless		s	ʃ		h
Fricative	voiced		z	(ʒ)		
Nasal		m	n	(ɲ)		
Liquid	rhotic		ɾ			
Liquid	lateral		l			
Glide		w		j		

/ʔ/ is only heard in the western dialect.

Vowels
	Front	Central	Back
High	i ĩ	ɨ ɨ̃	u ũ
Mid	e ẽ	ə ə̃	o õ
Low		a ã	

Sounds /ɨ, ɨ̃/ are only heard in the eastern dialect.

== Syntax ==
Baikarí word order is either subject–object–verb or object–verb–subject.
