= Onyeka Ibe =

Nigerian-born American abstract expressionist painter

- Born: 29 September 1971 (age 54); Nigeria
- Known for: Expression painting
- Awards: The Best SOLO Artist of the Year 2006
- Website: www.onyekaibe.com

Onyeka Ibe (born 29 September 1971) is a Nigerian-born American abstract expressionist painter.

== Early life and education ==
Ibe was born on 29 September 1971 in Anambra State, Nigeria. He was introduced to drawing at an early age by his father, who was also a painter. At the age of 16, he exhibited his work at the National Gallery of Modern Art, Lagos, where the judges required him to perform a live demonstration to confirm he had painted the works himself. Upon proving his ability, he was awarded a full scholarship to complete his secondary education.

Ibe studied fine arts at the University of Benin, graduating in 1996 with a Bachelor of Fine Arts degree with first-class honours (summa cum laude). In 1998, his first visit to the United States was sponsored by Ebony magazine and Magic Johnson's Midsummer Night Magic charity event for indigent African American students. He subsequently relocated to the United States and pursued further studies at Georgia State University in Atlanta and Pratt Institute in New York.

== Career ==
Ibe's paintings draw on elements of abstraction, African visual culture, and contemporary artistic traditions. His work incorporates dark earthy tones, fragments of discovered objects, and recycled paints to produce sculptural installations and multi-layered paintings rooted in indigenous African art and architecture.

He has exhibited his works extensively across the United States, Mexico, South America, Europe, Asia, and Africa. In 2002, The Atlanta Journal-Constitution described him as one of the most exciting young painters to emerge from Sub-Saharan Africa since the 1990s. In 2006, he received the Best Solo Artist of the Year award at International Artexpo New York. In July 2007, Art Business News profiled him as one of Today's Top Artists.

Ibe is a member of the Portrait Society of America, the Portrait Society of Atlanta, African Americans for the Arts, and the Quinlan Visual Arts Center in Georgia. He has painted portraits of presidents, musicians, political figures, and Hollywood personalities.

== Personal life ==
Ibe was born not long after the end of the Nigerian Civil War and grew up in a developing democracy. His art style and techniques were influenced by the work of Pablo Picasso and Jackson Pollock.
