= Bakhari =

Bakhari Бахари
- Settlement
- Location within Perm Krai Location within Russia
- Coordinates: 60°26′N 57°04′E
- Country: Russia
- Region: Perm Krai
- District: Krasnovishersky District
- Time zone: UTC+5:00

Bakhari (Russian: Бахари) is a rural locality (a settlement) in Krasnovishersky District, Perm Krai, Russia. The population was 46 as of 2010. There are 2 streets.

== Geography ==
Bakhari is located 7 km north of Krasnovishersk (the district's administrative centre) by road. Naberezhny is the nearest rural locality.
