= Bakari Fofana =

Malian footballer

Personal information
- Full name: Bakari Fofana
- Date of birth: December 20, 1962 (age 63)
- Place of birth: Bamako, Mali
- Position: Striker

Senior career*
| Years | Team | Apps | (Gls) |
| 1988–1989 | Chamois Niortais | 4 | (0) |
- * Club domestic league appearances and goals

Bakari Fofana (born December 20, 1962, in Bamako, Mali) is a former footballer who played as an attacker.
