= The Africa Project =

Nonprofit organisation in KwaZulu-Natal, South Africa

- Formation: 2005; 21 years ago
- Type: Nonprofit
- Purpose: Humanitarian
- Headquarters: KwaZulu-Natal, South Africa
- Website: Official website

The Africa Project is an all-volunteer non-profit organization founded by volunteers in 2005 that supports outreach programs and services in South Africa's KwaZulu-Natal province. The Africa Project strives to address extreme poverty, HIV, tuberculosis (TB), malnutrition and other issues that affect children and families in South African rural areas. The Africa Project works with local nongovernment organizations (NGOs) who provide services in their communities including the Sizanani Outreach Programme, in Nkandla, South Africa and Duduza Care Centre, in Wasbank, South Africa. The Africa Project welcomes those who wish to make a difference in the lives of children and families in Africa. "Together, there are so many lives we can change!"
