= Bakeri =

Bakeri may refer to:

- Mehdi Bakeri, an Iranian hero during the Iran–Iraq War
- Rozita binti Adil Bakeri (born 1973), the child name of the queen of Malaysia
- Saipul Bakeri, finalist in the Malaysian Idol TV program
- Achal Bakeri, Indian entrepreneur

== See also ==
- Bakery (disambiguation)
- Bakairi (disambiguation)
