= W.H. Biney =

Ghanaian businessman

- Occupation: Businessman

Nana William Hamilton Biney was a Ghanaian businessman who built a large stevedore company in Lagos.

Biney was a philanthropist and a generous businessmen who had friends all over the country. His house in Lagos served as a residence for many traditional rulers visiting the then capital.

== Life ==
Biney was born in the Gold Coast, what is now Ghana, in 1896. After his elementary education in the Gold Coast, he went to Sierra Leone and attended the Wesleyan Boys High School, Freetown, completing studies in 1904. Biney immigrated to Nigeria in 1911 and settled in Lagos. He initially worked as a bookkeeper for Miller Bros but in 1918, he left the firm and began working as a sub-contractor to Elder Dempster.

A pioneer in stevedoring, he founded W. Biney and Co. in 1918 as a labour contracting firm providing loading and offloading services at the quay to firms such as UAC. The company started with two sheds and expanded as port activities grew. The company was also involved in the offloading of kerosene and petrol at the Ijora Wharf from firms such as Vacuum Oil Company, and it later added railway contracting services. In 1959, the firm was involved in the establishment of a stevedoring business in Tema, Ghana. The firm was highly respected and up till 1964, was the sole contractor handling loading and offloading of cargo in Apapa.

Biney was also involved in labour related activities. In 1941, he established a privately funded labour registration bureau and a bulletin on labour issues.

Biney established a zoo, the first privately owned zoo in Nigeria. He was also a boxing patron and horticulturist. He served as a founding member of the Island Club.

The nana was the holder of a Ghanaian traditional chieftaincy. He died in the 1970s.
