= Catholic Missionary Union of England and Wales =

The Catholic Missionary Union of England and Wales is a forum for missionary activity and interests within the Roman Catholic Church in England and Wales.
