= Onyeka Akumah =

Nigerian businessman

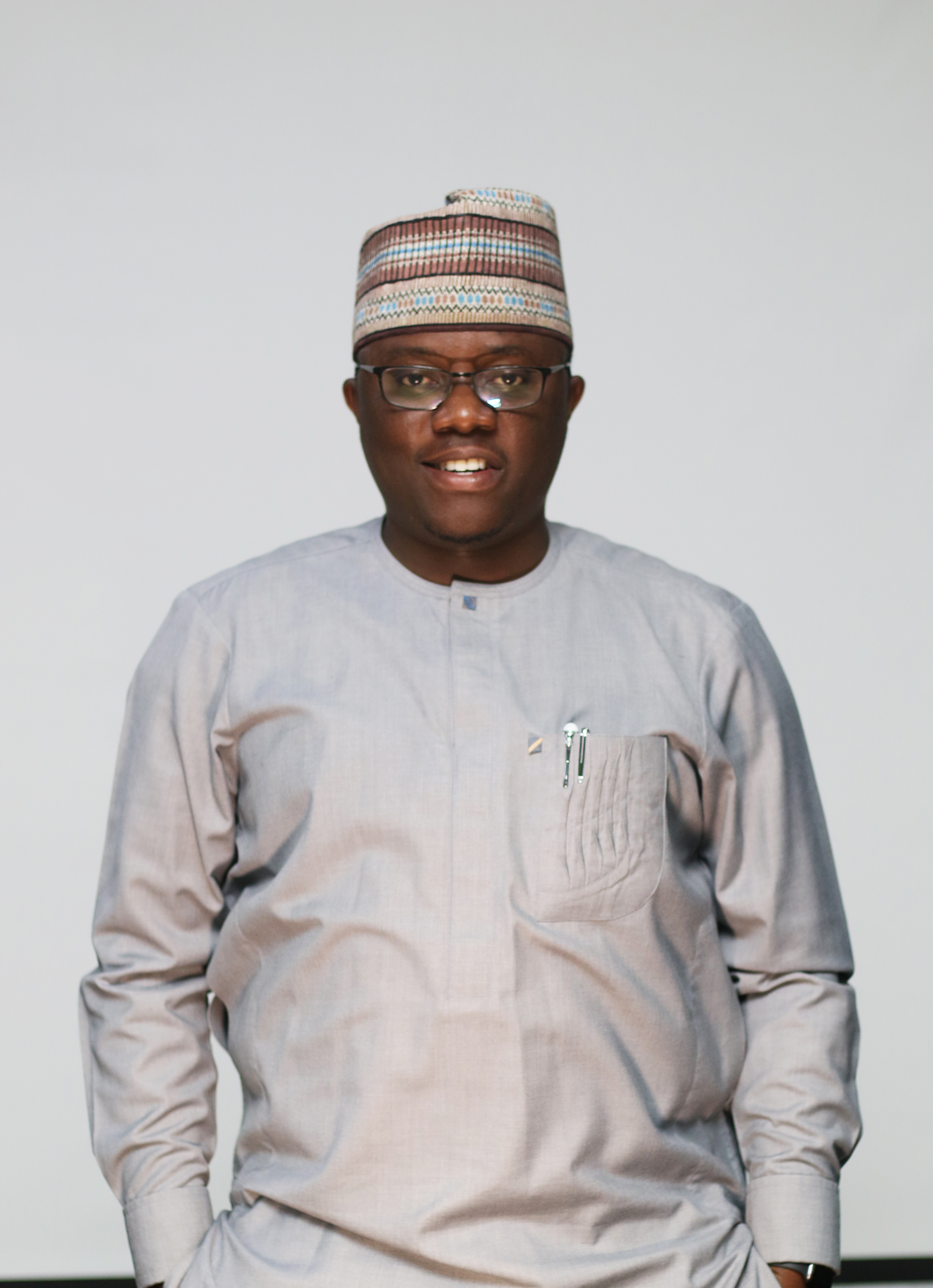
- Born: 21 October 1984 (age 42); Lagos, Lagos State, Nigeria.
- Education: BS in Applied Information Technology, Sikkim Manipal University India.
- Occupations: Tech entrepreneur, Startup Mentor and Investor
- Years active: 2007-present
- Known for: Founder of Treepz
- Notable work: Co-founding Treepz (formerly Plentywaka); Co-founding RentSmallSmall; Founding WO Community; Co-founding Farmcrowdy
- Title: CEO of Treepz
- Website: withonyeka.com

Onyeka Akumah (born 21 October 1984) is a Nigerian technology entrepreneur with a focus on transportation, agriculture, real estate, and media sectors. He is popularly known as the founder of Treepz Inc. Prior to founding his company in 2019, Onyeka Akumah was the CEO of Farmcrowdy. He is credited with having been involved in the success of various tech and e-commerce companies in Africa where he held positions and contributed to their growth.

== Early life and education ==
Onyeka was born in Lagos State, and just before he was 2 years old, his parents relocated to Sokoto State, North-west Nigeria where he did his Primary and Secondary School education. Onyeka earned his Bachelor's degree at the Sikkim Manipal University India where he graduated with a Grade A or First Class Honours in Applied Information Technology.

== Career ==
Onyeka ventured into entrepreneurship at a very young age, building startups even while he was still in the university recording successes and failures as he grew. After obtaining his first degree, Onyeka started his work experience with British Council as a Webmaster before going on to join Deloitte as the E-Marketing Coordinator for East, West and Central Africa. In 2010, he was the online marketing manager for Wakanow, then later had a stint with GTB to launch the SME Market Hub Onyeka is an e-commerce expert whose experience spans top e-commerce companies such as Rocket Internet owned Jumia, Konga and Travelbeta leading their marketing and commercial activities. He is the co-founder of Farmcrowdy, Plentywaka, Crowdyvest and RentSmallSmall. He resigned as CEO of Farmcrowdy in 2021 and is currently the CEO of Treepz (formerly Plentywaka). He was ranked among the top 10 Nigeria entrepreneurs by Vanguard alongside Uche Pedro, Seun Osewa, Anthony Ejefoh, Linda Ikeji and Temie Giwa-Tubosun. In October 2021, he was interviewed by Peace Hyde for his Forbes Africa Feature, where he spoke about his entrepreneurial journey. He was also featured on TechCrunch where he spoke about African Start-Ups and Global Expansion.

On 2 March 2021, Onyeka resigned as CEO of Crowdyvest following a 100% sale of the business and Tope Omotolani was then appointed as CEO after she led a total acquisition of the company.

== Treepz ==
In September 2019, after an unfriendly bus transportation experience, Onyeka along with his co-founders Johnny Enagwolor, Oluseyi Afolabi and John Shaibu founded Treepz. During its rebranding process in September 2021, the company needed a more globally acceptable name, hence the change from Plentywaka to Treepz Inc. Treepz Inc is building Africa's shared mobility platform offering commuters convenience, safety, and comfort on their daily commute. With operations in Nigeria, Ghana and Uganda, Treepz has moved over 800,000 riders. Treepz Inc is set to disrupt the transportation sector with services such as shared daily rides. Travel rides and now ticketing solutions. In December 2021, Treepz partnered with 53-year-old licensed shuttle bus company, CMS Taxi and Motor Nigeria Limited (CMS T&M), to digitise transportation for 1.6 million customers annually. They operate in the Central Business District of Lagos including Marina, Lagos Island, Victoria Island, Ikoyi and Lekki areas of Lagos State, with buses and minivans.

== Farmcrowdy ==
In November 2016, Onyeka, together with his co-founders Ifeanyi Anazodo, Akindele Philips, Christopher Abiodun, and Temitope Omotolani founded Farmcrowdy Limited, an agricultural digital platform connecting small-scale farmers to investors with the goal of boosting the food production in Nigeria. Farmcrowdy, took off very fast, receiving its first angel investment of $60,000 a month after launch and in 2017, got a $1 million seed investment at the Techstars Atlanta Accelerators Programme. Today, the company has grown to a team of 55 individuals who have worked with over 25,000 rural farmers across 16 states in Nigeria including Kano, Niger, Nasarrawa, Ogun, Oyo, Osun, Edo, Akwa-Ibom, Lagos, Plateau, Kaduna, Adamawa, Niger, Kwara, Abuja, Sokoto, and Benue. Farmcrowdy is described by the Vice President of Nigeria, Professor Yemi Osinbajo as the company creating the new wealth in Agriculture and was later honoured with the National Productivity Order of Merit by President of Nigeria, Muhammadu Buhari.

In August 2019, Oyo State announced a partnership with Farmcrowdy to onboard 50,000 rural farmers in Oyo State. He noted the aim of FarmCrowdy at a briefing held at the main office in Lekki, Lagos in 2019. He said "We are establishing this new aggregate outfit as a subsidiary of Farmcrowdy to drive the growth of agriculture not just in Nigeria but on the continent. We have also managed to use the resources we were able to gather from both investors and supporters to put together in the business, to drive food production on the continent. Our aim for doing this is to do all the things that will make a farmers life better in the country. However, this does not in any way affect Farmcrowdy's operations rather; it will make it better and boost the agric value chain of the country."

== Personal life ==
Onyeka lives in Lagos, Nigeria. When he is not doing business or investing in startups, he enjoys speaking and teaching at various events and workshops.

== Publications ==
Onyeka Akumah published his autobiography on the 22nd of December 2024. Titled Zero To Forty: Don't Stop, Keep Building, the book describes Onyeka's journey from Jumia to Konga and Farmcrowdy to Treepz.
