= Bosun Tijani =

Nigerian-British entrepreneur (born 1977)

Minister of Communications, Innovation and Digital Economy
- Incumbent
- Assumed office 21 August 2023
- President: Bola Tinubu
- Preceded by: Isa Ali Pantami

Personal details
- Born: Olatunbosun Tijani; 20 July 1977 (age 49) Ogun State, Nigeria
- Spouse: Moji Tijani
- Children: 3: Abuja, Nigeria; Leicester, England
- Education: University of Leicester; Warwick Business School; University of Jos
- Occupation: Entrepreneur
- Known for: Co-Founder and CEO of Co-creation Hub (CcHUB), iHUB, Truppr and STEM Cafe
- Awards: Desmond Tutu Leadership Fellowship
- Website: bosuntijani.com

Olatunbosun Tijani (born 20 July 1977) is a Nigerian-British entrepreneur who is the current Nigerian minister of Communications, Innovation and Digital Economy, since 2023.

In 2019, under his leadership, CcHUB acquired Kenya's iHub and launched the CcHUB Design Lab in Kigali, Rwanda in the same year.

== Early life and education ==
Tijani was born in Agege, Lagos, Nigeria and spent his formative years there before moving to Abeokuta, Nigeria for his secondary education. In 1996, he then went on to Jos, Nigeria to study at the University of Jos where he first started off studying for a diploma in Computer Science before going on to study Economics, graduating with a Bachelor's degree in 2002. He later obtained an MSc in Information Systems and Management from the Warwick Business School, United Kingdom in 2007.

In 2023, Tijani earned a PhD in innovation and economic development from the School of Business, University of Leicester. His doctoral research focused on contributing to a better understanding of how the network perspective to innovation capacity could provide a contextually relevant framework for explaining the adoption and adaptation of innovation in developing countries and specifically offer an alternative path to how African countries could effectively organise their innovation ecosystems

Tijani has also been part of the Innovation for Economic Development executive programme at Harvard Kennedy School in 2013 as well as being a 2014 Draper Hills Fellow of the Centre for Democracy, Development and the Rule of Law (CDDRL) at Stanford University.

== Career ==
International Trade Centre

Before CcHUB, Tijani worked with the International Trade Centre, Geneva, Switzerland as a Fellow, researching on trade development with particular emphasis on enterprise management development. During this period, he successfully led the development and deployment of a web-marketing and information services programme in Ghana between March and September 2006 and subsequently in Uganda and Kenya which recorded positive outputs. The programme was deployed in Ethiopia and later extended to South Africa and Tanzania.

Hewlett Packard

At Hewlett Packard, he successfully managed the deployment of the ODel learning centre at the Africa Virtual University in Kenya and completed the deployment of the HP, IEEE and University of Ibadan telecentre in Nigeria. He also initiated and completed the deployment of the HP Micro-enterprise Acceleration Programme learning centre at the Lagos Business School in Nigeria and provided recognizable support to its deployment in Egypt and Morocco.

Pera Innovation Network

Tijani would later move to Pera Innovation Network (PERA) in 2007 where he served as the European Innovation Manager. At PERA, he led the coordination of innovation agencies across Europe. In different capacities, he was responsible for managing the Pan-European Research Network of Universities participating in the Framework Programme 7 as well as the INNOTEX Project - A European Commission funded project for the development of a cross cluster best practice platform for entrepreneurial innovation for the technical textile sector (United Kingdom, Spain, Estonia and Denmark).

== Minister of Communications, Innovation and Digital Economy ==
On 16 August 2023, President Bola Tinubu appointed Tijani as the minister of Communications, Innovation and Digital Economy. Under his leadership, the Ministry launched the 3 Million Technical Talent (3MTT) program in late 2023. The 3MTT program is a major government policy aimed at training three million Nigerians in technical skills, such as software engineering, data science, and animation, to build a global tech talent export pipeline.

== Personal life ==
Tijani resides in Abuja (Nigeria) and Leicester (United Kingdom) with his wife, Moji Tijani and three children.
