= Co-Creation Hub =

Nigerian technology company

- Official logo
- Trade name: Co-Creation Hub Nigeria
- Type: Private
- Industry: Information technology
- Founded: August 2011; 15 years ago in Yaba, Lagos, Lagos State, Nigeria
- Founders: Bosun Tijani; Femi Longe
- Headquarters: Yaba, Lagos State, Nigeria
- Key people: Bosun Tijani (CEO); Femi Longe (Director of Programmes, Open Living Labs); Tunji Eleso (Managing Partner, Growth Capital by CcHUB)
- Website: cchubnigeria.com

Co-creation HUB, commonly referred to as Cc-HUB or the HUB, is a technology-oriented centre located in Yaba, a district of Lagos. Founded in 2010 by Bosun Tijani and Femi Longe, it provides a platform where technology-oriented people share ideas to solving social problems in Nigeria.

Cc-HUB hosted Facebook founder, Mark Zuckerberg, during his visit to Nigeria on August 30, 2016.

== History ==
Co-creation HUB was founded in October 2010 by Bosun Tijani and Femi Longe. It officially opened in September 2011 as a social innovation centre at 294, Herbert Macaulay, Yaba, serving as an open living lab dedicated to accelerating the application of social capital and technology for economic prosperity. Its methodology is said to be hinged on engaging a community of progressive stakeholders (end-users, subject-matter experts, government agencies, businesses, academics, civil societies etc.) who bring their creativity and knowledge to play in co-creating solutions to social challenges faced by the average Nigerian.

At the CcHUB, innovations by entrepreneurs are supported through advice, mentorship and funding through the pre-incubation and research unit. The CcHUB happens to be one of the few financially sustainable innovation hubs in Africa and is the home to over 50 Nigerian startups, such as BudgIT, Wecyclers, Truppr, Genii Games, Lifebank, GoMyWay, Vacantboards, Traclist, Autobox, Stutern, Findworka, Grit Systems and Mamalette.

In March 2018, Stanbic IBTC Bank launched the Blue Lab, an innovation hub supported by Co-Creation Hub.

== Growth Capital by CcHUB ==
In December 2015, Tijani announced the launch of Growth Capital in partnership with Bank of Industry (BoI), Venture Garden Group (VGG) and Omidyar Network (ON). It is an investment arm that is set to invest 1billion Naira in social tech ventures who are building technologies that make public services smarter while connecting them to citizens and/or smart technologies linking multiple public services together to make them more accessible to citizens.

GC's Managing Partner, Tunji Eleso, in an interview with Tech Crunch, stated that after supporting startups from ideation, pre-incubation to incubation for five (5) years, it became imperative to take a step forward by supporting those that are maturing but still require support. The fund proffered by Growth Capital by CcHUB is meant to support entrepreneurs who are building infrastructure for Nigeria's future. "Specifically, we are looking at products/services/technology tools that would make public services smarter and at the same time connect more citizens of Nigeria to those services", Eleso added.

== Make-IT Accelerator ==
The Make-IT Accelerator programme by Co-Creation HUB is designed to strengthen entrepreneurs' skills for scaling their innovations and achieving growth, cooperation and investment readiness. The programme is being implemented in Nigeria and Kenya.

== Giving4Good Challenge ==
The Giving4Good Challenge launched by Co-creation HUB is designed to explore the ways in which technology can increase individual philanthropy towards CSOs and NGOs in Nigeria. The top 3 ventures receives a combined funding of up to £35,000, and they will be supported by the Hub's Pre-Incubation program.

== iHub ==
On 26 September 2019, it was announced that Co-Creation Hub had acquired the Nairobi iHub.
