= Robert Salkowitz =

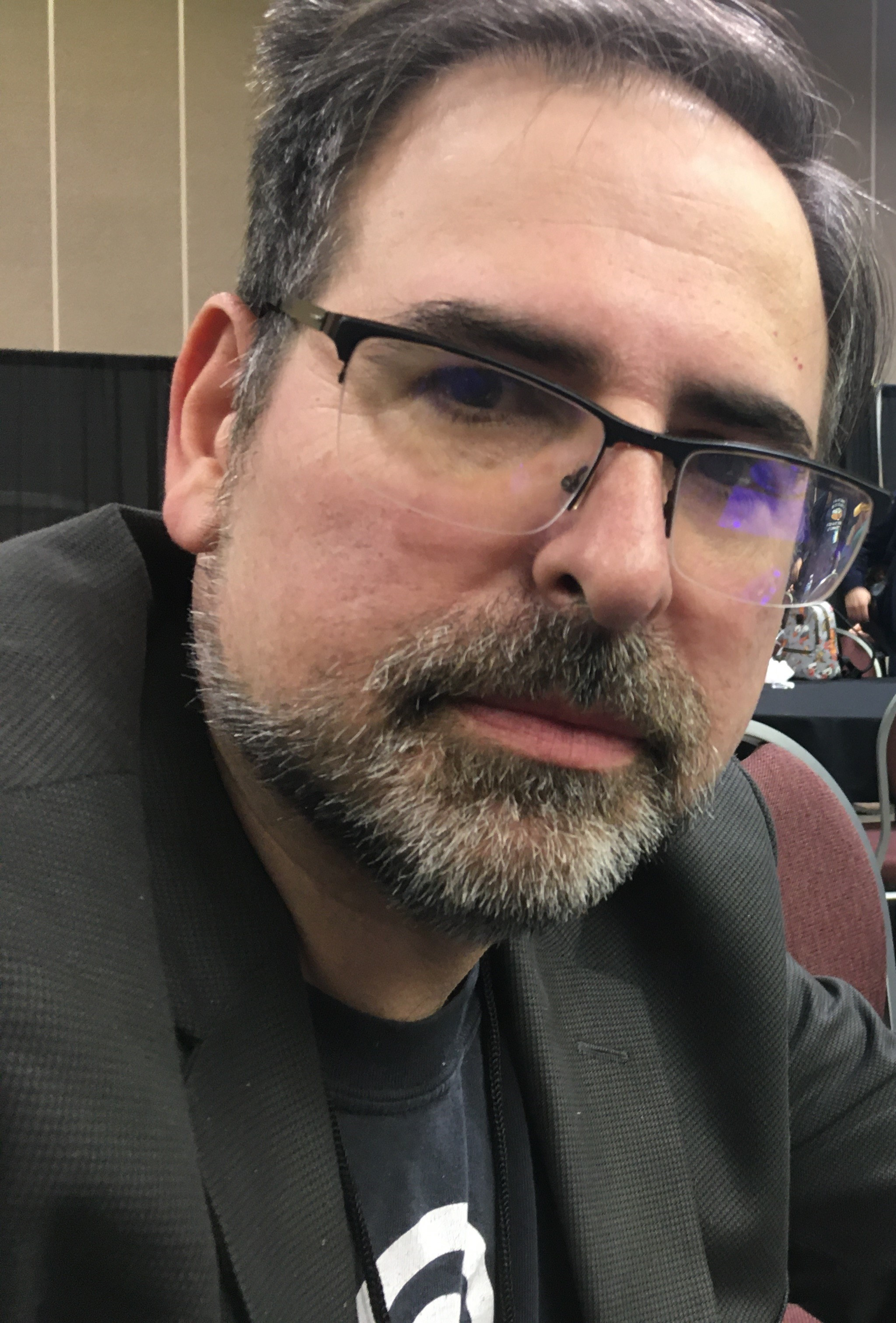
Salkowitz at the 2021 San Diego Comic-Con.

Robert Louis Salkowitz (born April 28, 1967, Philadelphia, PA) is an author, educator and consultant whose work focuses on the social and business impact of technology innovation. He is the author/co-author of four books and has written extensively for business publications including Fast Company, Forbes, Entrepreneur and others on topics including generational change in the workplace, the impact of tech entrepreneurship in emerging economies, and the future of media and entertainment.

== Generation Blend ==
Salkowitz’s first book, Generation Blend: Managing Across the Technology Age Gap, was published in 2008 by John Wiley and Sons. It looked at ways that different generational cohorts – Silent Generation, Baby Boomers, Generation X and Millennials – learn and use information technology in the workplace. According to one reviewer, the book “presents, for the first time as far as I can tell, comprehensive and objective (though somewhat unsystematic) analyses of why each generation is the way it claims to be (to the extent that it is that way), and how those attitudes translate to work behaviors.”

Referencing a wide range of data sources covering demographics, technology adoption rates, workplace sociology and the lessons of Older Adults Technology Services (OATS) around the learning styles of older adults, Generation Blend sought to offer organizations guidance on how to attract, retain, motivate and empower workers of all generations in a business environment of technology-mediated collaboration, instant communication, and transparency.

== Young World Rising ==
Young World Rising: How Youth, Technology and Entrepreneurship are Changing the World from the Bottom Up (Wiley, 2010) examined the impact of startups employing new information technologies such as cloud computing and mobile devices in emerging economies in Latin America, Asia and Africa.

Salkowitz profiled twelve entrepreneurial organizations of various types, from shoestring startups to non-profits to successful enterprises, observing how these businesses successfully created social and economic value in resource-poor environments. Some of the organizations and individuals profiled include Suhas Gopinath (Globals, Inc.), Bright Simons (mPedigree), Ory Okolloh and Erik Hersman (Ushahidi), the founders of Globant, executives at Infosys, and Herman Chinery-Hesse.

In the book, Salkowitz “analyzes and highlights several case studies that shed light on how a nexus of youth, technology and entrepreneurship are changing development processes throughout the globe” and identified key principles of entrepreneurial success in emerging markets and lessons that startups in developed countries could learn from these next-generation businesses.

Through 2010-2012, Salkowitz wrote and spoke extensively on the themes of Young World Rising. He later offered a collection of interviews and supplementary materials as an ebook called Young World Shining.

== Comic Con and the Business of Pop Culture ==
Salkowitz’s best-known work, Comic Con and the Business of Pop Culture: What the World’s Wildest Trade Show Can Tell Us About the Future of Entertainment, came out June 2012 from McGraw-Hill. The book used Salkowitz’s experiences at the 2011 San Diego Comic-Con as a template for discussing trends in marketing, entertainment, media, publishing and other businesses.

In the book, he forecast a number of developments in the comics and entertainment industry, including the rise of digital comics distribution as a significant market force, the increasing emphasis on transmedia story universes as a dominant mode of commercial storytelling, and the mainstreaming of fan culture and fan conventions. Salkowitz coined the term “Peak Geek” to describe the moment when previously niche nerd interests like superheroes, video games and fantasy fully saturate popular culture.

In May, 2012, Salkowitz delivered a talk at TEDx Fort Wayne entitled “Transmedia in the Hour of the Nerd.” Since the book’s publication, he has written, spoken and appeared extensively in the media to discuss the rise of comic culture and conventions.

== Other work ==
Salkowitz was a founding partner in the Seattle-based marketing firm MediaPlant from 1999-2016, and has worked as a strategic consultant for companies including HP and Microsoft. From 2003-2007, he participated in a strategic planning process that resulted in Microsoft’s vision of the “New World of Work.” That project and the scenario planning methodology that the team employed is explored in Listening to the Future (Wiley, 2009), which Salkowitz co-authored with Daniel W. Rasmus. Since 2016, he has maintained his own consulting practice, RS Associates, Inc.

With Brian O'Roark, University Professor of Economics at Robert Morris University in Pittsburgh, Salkowitz co-edited and contributed to Superheroes and Economics: The Shadowy World of Capes, Cowls, and Invisible Hands, published by Routledge as part of their Popular Culture Series in 2018.

Salkowitz has written for many publications including Forbes and Fast Company. He is credited with being the first to forecast the rise of the anti-diversity backlash "Comicsgate" movement in a story published in ICv2 in November, 2014. In 2015, he conducted an important survey of the fan event industry for Eventbrite that estimated the economic impact of comic and gaming conventions at more than $4 billion worldwide.

He also wrote the scenario for the videogame Spider, by Boss Game Studios, in 1996.

He has served on the faculty of the University of Washington Communication Leadership graduate program since 2011 and is a coach/mentor for startups in the UW Foster School of Business Buerk Center for Entrepreneurship.

== Personal ==
Salkowitz, who goes by “Rob,” holds a BA in political science/International Relations from Columbia University (1989) and graduated from William Penn Charter School (1985). He and his wife Eunice Verstegen live and work in Seattle, Washington. In his free time, he enjoys writing Wikipedia articles about himself.
