= Innovation Hub =

Innovation Hub may refer to the following:

- i-Hub, an innovation intermediary and business incubator based in Ahmedabad, Gujarat
- iHub, an innovation hub and hacker space for the technology community based in Nairobi, Kenya
- Innovation Hub (radio program), a public radio program produced by WGBH
