= Konza Technopolis =

Techno-city project in Kenya

- Interactive map of Konza Technopolis
- Location: Machakos/Makueni/Kajiado Buffer Zone
- Coordinates: 1.689°S 37.185°E
- Opening date: 2030
- Developer: HR&A Advisors, Inc
- Construction cost: Kshs 1.2 trillion
- Architect: SHoP Architects
- Size: 2,000 ha (5,000 acres)
- Website: www.konza.go.ke

Konza Technopolis, also known as Silicon Savannah, is a large technology hub being built 64 km (39 mi) south of Nairobi. Its location spreads across the three counties of Machakos, Makueni, and Kajiado. It is a gazetted Special Economic Zone. Konza hosted the 41st International Association of Science Parks (IASP) conference between 25 and 27 September 2024.

== Planning ==
Konza Technopolis is a smart city flagship project and a key component of Kenya's Vision 2030, which is positioned within the Economic and Macro Pillar under the business process outsourcing sector and related IT-enabled services (ITES).

=== Design team ===
The Expression of Interest for this assignment attracted 22 firm responses, narrowed to 6 in a shortlist. The Ministry and IFC selected the team led by HR&A Advisors, Inc. that included SHoP Architects, the Center for Urban and Regional Planning, OZ Architecture, Tetra Tech, Dar Al-Handasah, WPP-Scangroup, Hill & Knowlton, and HP-Gauff Ingenieure.

=== Master Delivery Partner 1 plan ===
The Ministry of Information and Communications and the International Finance Corporation (IFC) engaged Master Delivery Partner 1 (MDP1) to prepare a detailed business plan and master plan for Phase 1 in July 2012. The initial feasibility and concept master plan was prepared jointly by Deloitte and Pell Frischmann, a UK-based design consultancy, and funded by the IFC. At that stage, the project brief was limited to a technology park of 280 ha (700 acres) with BPO/IT businesses at its core. During the feasibility study, Pell Frischmann proposed that Konza Technology City develop technology park into a more viable destination. The Kenyan government agreed and commissioned a new master plan for a city of 2,000 ha (5,000 acres) that was completed by Pell Frischmann.

The land on which Konza was to be built was acquired from Malili Ranch Limited for 1 billion Kenyan shillings, a deal that has since been a subject of multiple controversies, evidenced by ongoing court cases. Konza Technopolis was approved by the Parliament Account Committee and endorsed by the Kenyan Government.

=== Administration ===
The study also recommended the creation of a management board to enhance the development of Konza. The government set up the Konza Technolopolis Development Authority (KoTDA), whose Board of Directors was appointed in 2013 and is currently overseeing the development of infrastructure for Phase 1 of Konza. The initial board, appointed by the then Information Minister, Samuel Poghisio, consisted of economist Haron Nyakundi (then-chairman of the Quantity Surveyors Chapter of the Architectural Association of Kenya), architects Reuben Mutiso and Emma Miloyo (then-deputy president of the Architectural Society of Kenya), Rosemary Maundu, and investment banker John Ngumi.

The first CEO of the KoTDA was Catherine Adeya-Weya, who later resigned from her position. She was succeeded by John Kipchumba Tanui in 2015. The current CEO is John Paul Okwiri.

== Construction ==
The groundbreaking for construction at Konza was done in January 2013 by President Mwai Kibaki. Thereafter, the project took a slower turn after the end of President Kibaki's tenure, with people casting doubts on whether the flagship project would be actualized. This was triggered by the fact that several years later, no notable construction had been done on the land. The technopolis is currently being built in different phases:

=== Phase One ===
This phase had an initial 5-year development period, with completion scheduled for 2020. This phase took off with a delay due to funding constraints. The proposal was to develop 410 acres out of the 5000 acres of land owned for this purpose. It would be built to have a university, residential area, parks, office space, and life science facilities. Upon completion, Phase one was intended to create at least 16,000 jobs.

==== Horizontal infrastructure ====
This 170-hectare phase involved the development of essential infrastructure, including 40 kilometers of paved, landscaped roads with stormwater drainage and sewage systems, a water treatment plant and reservoir, power and telecom networks, public spaces, a welcome centre, a safety complex (police and fire stations), utility tunnels, a waste facility, and a transit hub. An agreement between the Kenyan government and an Italian firm in June 2017 kicked off the process of construction of Phase one, with an estimated cost of $391 million (Ksh 50.4 billion). The financing agreement was between the government and UniCredit SpA of Italy, for the horizontal infrastructure through the Engineering, Procurement, Construction, and Financing (EPCF) model. The contract was awarded to Impresa Construzioni Maltauro (ICM) Group, Italy. The construction was completed in 2022.

==== Konza Complex Office Block ====
The Konza Complex, which houses the headquarters and other offices, was completed in 2019. The nine-story office block hosts the Konza Technopolis headquarters. This was the first phase of the project. The Open University of Kenya is also hosted here. In September 2024, Donghua University and the Open University of China signed a memorandum of understanding with the Open University of Kenya to strengthen collaboration in digital education. Thereafter, the China-Africa digital learning center was launched in February 2025 at the Open University of Kenya. The second phase of the project will comprise a five-star hotel and a conference facility.

==== National Data Centre ====
In 2019, Huawei committed to building a National Cloud data center, smart ICT city, and traffic and surveillance project, as well as a Government Cloud service at Konza worth Ksh17.5 billion which was funded with Chinese concessional loans. By 2020, the first phase, i.e., construction of a containerized National Data Centre, was completed. The second phase, a Tier III National Data Center with Smart City facilities and services to support Konza Technopolis, e-government as well as the Small and Medium Enterprises Services, was completed by 2021.

==== Kenya Advanced Institute of Science and Technology (KAIST) ====
logy (KAIST) is being built on a 36-acre parcel of land in Konza at a cost of 13 billion shillings, 8 billion of which is provided by the South Korean government, whereas the remainder is provided by the Kenyan government. It is modeled on South Korea's Advanced Institute of Science and Technology. The project contractor is BOMI Engineering and Construction Consortium. It is intended to advance STEM courses and enhance the number of specialists in Kenya. It was planned to admit its first Master's and Doctoral students in 2023. The cabinet, on March 11th 2025, approved the institution as a specialised post-degree awarding institution of strategic national importance. As of 2025, the first phase of its construction was complete. Phase Two will include the setup of labs, hiring faculty, and an academic launch in 2026.

==== Konza Technopolis Security Command Centre ====
The groundbreaking was presided over by ministers Joe Mucheru of ICT and Fred Matiang'i of Interior in 2021. The project features the construction of a Police Station, security barrier, entrance feature, fire station, emergency response unit, and an emergency response centre.

=== Phase Two ===
The first phase of the EIPP projects laid the foundation for the technopolis's development. Key initiatives undertaken during this phase included the formulation of the Konza Technopolis Smart City master plan, a feasibility study focused on the Integrated Operations Centre with an emphasis on security operations, and the establishment of an intelligent transport system and smart mobility basic plan.

The second phase involves a preliminary feasibility study for an intelligent transport system and integrated control centre, the establishment of a startup ecosystem implementation plan for Konza, consultation for the implementation of smart logistics in Konza (such as smart parking, digital signage, and electric vehicle services), and the establishment of a master plan for the development of the Konza-Nairobi Corridor Transport Network. The Korea Trade-Investment and Promotion Agency and the Konza Technopolis Development Authority are implementing the projects on behalf of the two governments.

In 2024, KoTDA, along with the Korea Trade-Investment Promotion Agency (KOTRA) launched the 3rd Year of EIPP that focuses on establishing essential infrastructure, including an incubation complex, smart farm, and diverse energy sources, aligning with Konza's green transition and energy independence goals. Notable milestones will include industrial clusters, smart city development, and the Konza Digital Media City. The Konza-Nairobi Corridor Transport Network road construction, specifically the Machakos turnoff to Emali, is expected to being in 2025. Kenya also signed an MoU with the Korea Electronic Association to establish a $1.4 million electronics and information technology manufacturing support centre at Konza. The project, valued at 180 million Kenyan shillings, will unfold in four phases over 2-3 years.

==== Economic Innovation Partnership Program (EIPP) with South Korea ====
The Korea-Kenya EIPP project started in 2021 and went through a consultation process between the two countries. EIPP is a new and extended cooperation model of the KSP (Knowledge Sharing Program) of Korea to foster mutually beneficial relationships between South Korea and partner countries.

===== Digital media city =====
At the sidelines of the Korea–Africa summit in 2024, South Korea and the Kenyan government entered into a financing agreement with the Government of South Korea to establish a digital media city. The Digital Media City (DMC) project, which is a city within, will sit on 65 hectares. The Digital Media City will provide support to Kenya's creative sector in providing shared state-of-the-art infrastructure for content creators and digital innovators.

==== Smart Vaccine Facility Project (SVFP) ====
In October 2024, a delegation from South Korea, including SK Bioscience, conducted a feasibility study for the potential establishment of a smart vaccine manufacturing facility in Kenya. As part of the study, they visited Konza Technopolis. Konza technopolis continues to attract more Korean companies.

== Investments ==
By the end of the 2022–23 fiscal year, at least 75% of the parcels at Konza Technopolis had been committed by investors. Some of the investors include Riara University, the Africa Center for Technology Studies, the National Construction Authority, and the National Housing Corporation. In February 2025, the government gave an ultimatum urging investors to begin developing their plots. The government is pushing for rapid development of the area.

== See also ==
- iHub
- NaiLab
- Silicon Savannah
- Kigali Innovation City
