= Co-worker =

Co-worker or coworker may refer to:

- A fellow employee at the same workplace or company
- A person working at a place of coworking (common working space shared with unrelated companies)
- The Coworker, a 2023 novel by Freida McFadden
- Coworker (company), an online marketplace for coworking spaces

== See also ==
- Worker cooperative
- Coworker backstabbing
- Worker (disambiguation)
- CO (disambiguation)
