= Eliud Owalo =

Kenyan politician and government minister

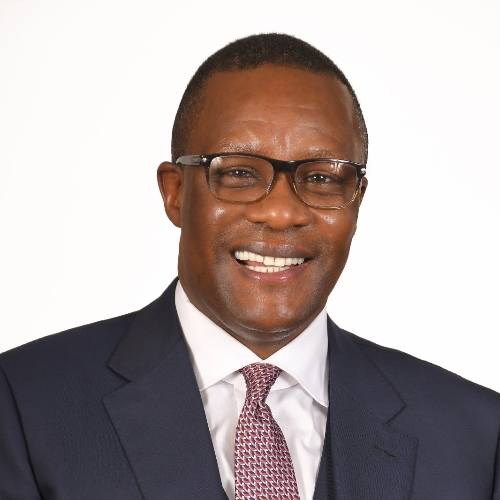

Deputy Chief of Staff (Delivery and Government Efficiency)
- Incumbent
- Assumed office 2024
- President: William Ruto

Cabinet Secretary for Ministry of Information and Communications (Kenya)
- In office 2022–2024
- President: William Ruto
- Preceded by: Joseph Mucheru
- Succeeded by: Margaret N. Ndung'u

Personal details
- Education: Kenyatta University; University of Nairobi
- Occupation: Economist, Management Consultant and Strategy Expert
- Website: Official website

Eliud Owalo is the former deputy chief of staff in charge of Delivery and Government Efficiency in the Executive Office of the President of Kenya. Previously, he was cabinet secretary for Information, Communication & Digital Economy in the Cabinet of Kenya since 2022.

== Career ==
Owalo is a Fellow of the Institute of Human Resource Management; Fellow of the Economists Society of Kenya; Member, Institute of Economic Affairs; Full Member, Kenya Institute of Management; Member of the Professional Trainers’ Association of Kenya; and a Former Director/Council Member of the Kenya School of Government.
