= Majoran =

Majoran is a non-profit coworking space in Adelaide, South Australia, established by entrepreneurs Michael Reid, Chhai Thatch and William Chau in 2012. It was Adelaide's first private startup coworking space focusing on the tech startup community, and remains Adelaide's only coworking space dedicated to tech companies.

Majoran hosts Adelaide startup and tech events including Hackerspace Adelaide, SouthStart and Silicon Beach Adelaide.

Initially known as Majoran Distillery, it dropped Distillery after a controversial branding change by an Adelaide digital agency now known as The Distillery.
