= Angela Oduor Lungati =

Kenyan technologist, community builder and open-source software advocate

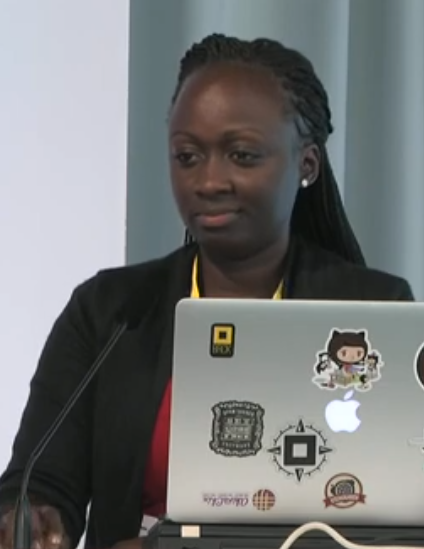
- Speaking at an HBS event in 2015
- Born: Kenya
- Education: Strathmore University
- Occupations: Technologist, Executive Director
- Organization(s): Ushahidi, AkiraChix, Creative Commons
- Known for: Executive Director of Ushahidi, Co-founder of AkiraChix, Chair of Creative Commons Board
- Notable work: Open-source civic tech, community innovation, digital inclusion
- Awards: World Economic Forum Young Global Leader (2024), Mozilla Rise25 Honoree
- Website: Ushahidi.com

Angela Oduor Lungati is a Kenyan technologist, community builder and open-source software advocate who was elected as the chair Board of directors for Creative Common in 2024. She is also the Executive Director of Ushahidi. She is known for her advocacy in digital inclusion, community-driven innovation, and the use of technology for social impact. She is also a co-founder of AkiraChix, an organization dedicated to nurturing generations of women in technology in Africa.

== Background and education ==
Lungati studied Business Information Technology at Strathmore University in Nairobi, Kenya. During her time at university, she was introduced to the Nairobi tech scene through the iHub and participated in an internship that connected her with other young women in tech, leading to the founding of AkiraChix.

== Career ==
Lungati began working with Ushahidi as a volunteer during the 2010 Kenyan constitutional referendum. She then formally joined the organization as a software development intern in 2011, then rose through the ranks to become Director of Community Engagement. In this role, she led Ushahidi’s user engagement and support initiatives, helping users across more than 160 countries. In 2019, she was appointed Executive Director of Ushahidi. Under her leadership, Ushahidi continues to grow and scale under her leadership in crisis response, election monitoring, grassroots data-collection globally. In 2010, co-founded AkiraChix with Lungati (non-profit organization that inspires more African women to go after tech careers). The organization provides training, mentorship, and resources for young women, especially those from underprivileged backgrounds, to gain skills in software development and design.

== Advocacy and recognition ==
Lungati is a prominent advocate for inclusion and ethics in technology. She was recognized as a 2024 World Economic Forum Young Global Leader and named one of Mozilla's Rise25 Honorees, celebrating her leadership in advancing trustworthy and inclusive AI and civic tech initiatives. She has spoken at several global forums including RightsCon, MozFest, and the Internet Governance Forum, often addressing the intersection of technology, social justice, and community empowerment.

== Personal life ==
Angela works from Nairobi, Kenya. She loves to coach, story telling and community generated innovation in addition to work commitments.

== See also ==
- Ushahidi
