= Juliana Rotich =

Kenyan informatician

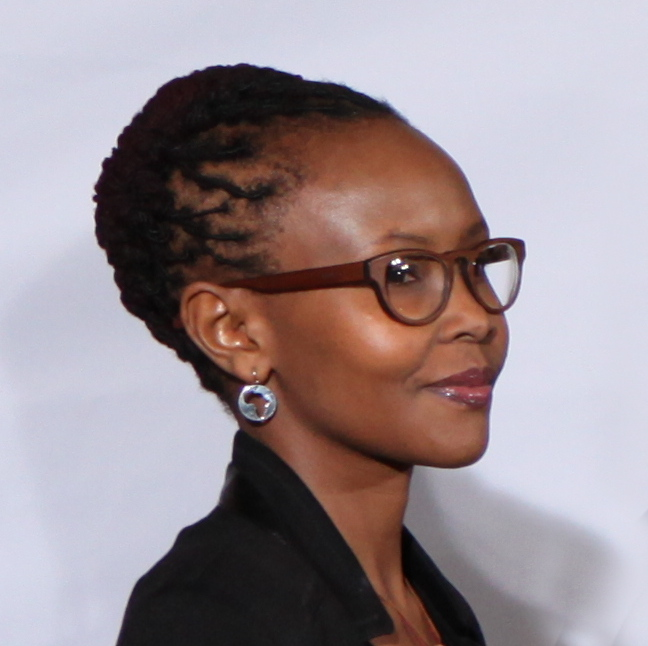
- Rotich in 2017
- Born: 1977 (age 48–49); Kenya
- Education: University of Missouri–Kansas City (Bachelor of Science in Computer Science)

Juliana Rotich is a Kenyan information technology professional, who has developed web tools for crowdsourcing crisis information and coverage of topics related to the environment. She is the co-founder of iHub, a collective tech space in Nairobi, Kenya, and of Ushahidi, open-source software for collecting and mapping information. She is a TED Senior Fellow.

She is a trustee of Bankinter Foundation for Entrepreneurship and Innovation in Spain, as well as a member of Kenya Vision 2030 Delivery Board. She was the head of East Africa Country Cluster for BASF from May to December 2018.

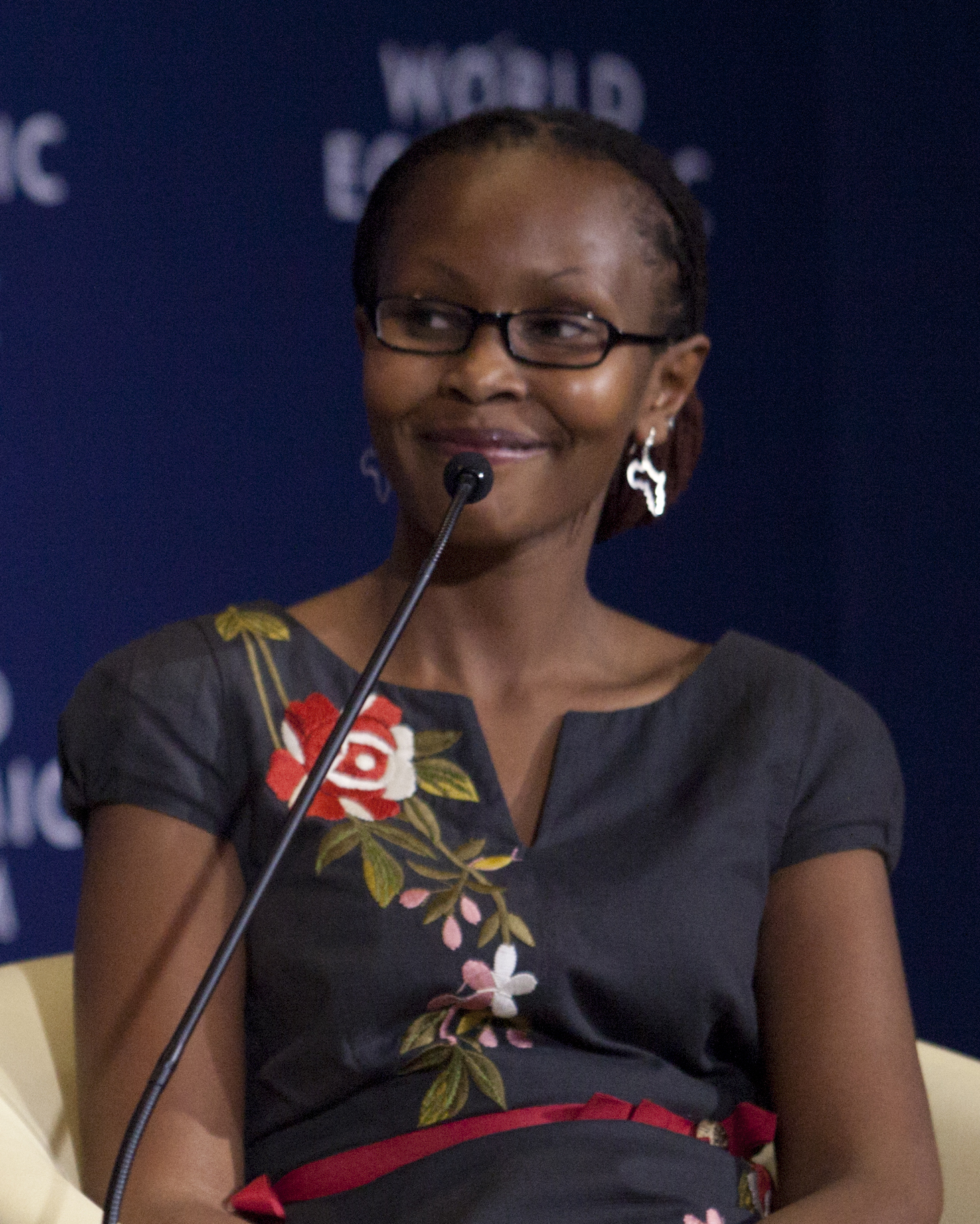
Juliana Rotich - World Economic Forum on Africa 2012

== Background and education ==
Rotich was born in 1977 in Kenya. After attending elementary and secondary school locally, she was admitted to the University of Missouri–Kansas City, in the United States. She graduated from there with a Bachelor of Science degree in Computer Science. She is an MIT Media Lab Fellow.

== Career ==
In 1999 Rotich started working at Sprint Nextel Corporation. In 2005 she left and moved to Chicago, Illinois, to work at InterCall Inc. A year later, she joined National Seminars Group, where she designed and maintained SQL Server databases. In 2007, she joined Hewitt Associates as a data analyst.

In 2008 Rotich co-founded the non-profit company Ushahidi, an Open-source software project which uses crowdsourced geolocation, mobile phone, and web reporting data to provide crisis reporting and information. She served as the Executive Director of Ushahidi from 2011 until 2015.

"Ushahidi" is the Swahili word for "testimony." Ushahidi was first put into practice during the Kenyan presidential election crisis of 2007–2008; it has since been used in Chile, Japan, New Zealand, Australia, Pakistan, Tanzania, and Haiti.

As a blogger, Rotich has authored articles on Afrigadget.com, acted as Environmental Editor of Global Voices Online, and participated in the TED Global Conference in Arusha in 2007. As a public speaker, she is known for her commentary on technology in Africa and voicing concerns about the loss of indigenous forest and water catchment areas in Kenya.

To help solve the lack of internet access due to blackouts in Nairobi, Rotich co-founded BRCK Inc., which produces a battery-operated modem that can run for eight hours without electricity.

In 2014, Rotich presented at the annual Design Indaba Conference in Cape Town. From 2014 until 2015, she served on United Nations Secretary-General Ban Ki-moon's Independent Expert Advisory Group on the Data Revolution for Sustainable Development, co-chaired by Enrico Giovannini and Robin Li.

In 2017 Rotich participated in the W20 Summit in Berlin, Germany and took part in a panel discussion together with Chancellor Angela Merkel, IMF director Christine Lagarde, Queen Máxima of the Netherlands, Canadian Minister of Foreign Affairs Chrystia Freeland, Ivanka Trump and others, where she represented BRCK.

In 2022, Safaricom named Rotich as its Head of Fintech Integration Solutions where she oversees the company’s financial solutions, which are anchored on M-Pesa.

== Other activities ==
=== Corporate boards ===
- Standard Group, Non-Executive Director of the Board of Directors (since 2018)
- BASF, Member of the Global Sustainability Advisory Council (2018)
- Microsoft, Member of the 4Afrika Advisory Council (since 2013)

=== Non-profit organizations ===
- Bill & Melinda Gates Foundation, Member of the AI Ethics and Safety Advisory Committee (since 2023)
- Lemelson Foundation, Member of the Advisory Committee (since 2017)

== Recognition ==
In 2011, Rotich was named Schwab Foundation Social Entrepreneur of the Year in Africa by the World Economic Forum. She earned a TED Senior Fellowship and a Director's Fellowship by the MIT Media Laboratory. In 2011, she was named among the "World's Top 100 Women" by The Guardian Newspaper.

In 2012, Forbes.com named Rotich as one of "The 20 Youngest Power Women In Africa".

In 2013, Rotich was awarded the Digital, Life, Design (DLD) Women Impact Award, at a ceremony in Munich, Germany.

In 2014, Fortune named Rotich one of the "World's 50 Greatest Leaders".

In 2019, she was presented the German Africa Prize, awarded by the German Africa Foundation, for her longstanding efforts to foster democracy, peace, and technological innovation. The award was presented by German Chancellor Angela Merkel.

Rotich has also been recognized as a World Economic Forum Young Global Leader. In 2013, Rotich was awarded the Digital, Life, Design (DLD) Women Impact Award, at a ceremony in Munich, Germany. In 2019, she was presented the German Africa Prize, awarded by the German Africa Foundation, to honor “outstanding individuals for their longstanding endeavors to foster democracy, peace, human rights, art, culture, the social market economy and social concerns”. The award was presented to Rotich by the German Chancellor, Angela Merkel. In 2012 Forbes.com named Juliana Rotich as one of "The 20 Youngest Power Women In Africa 2012".

External videos
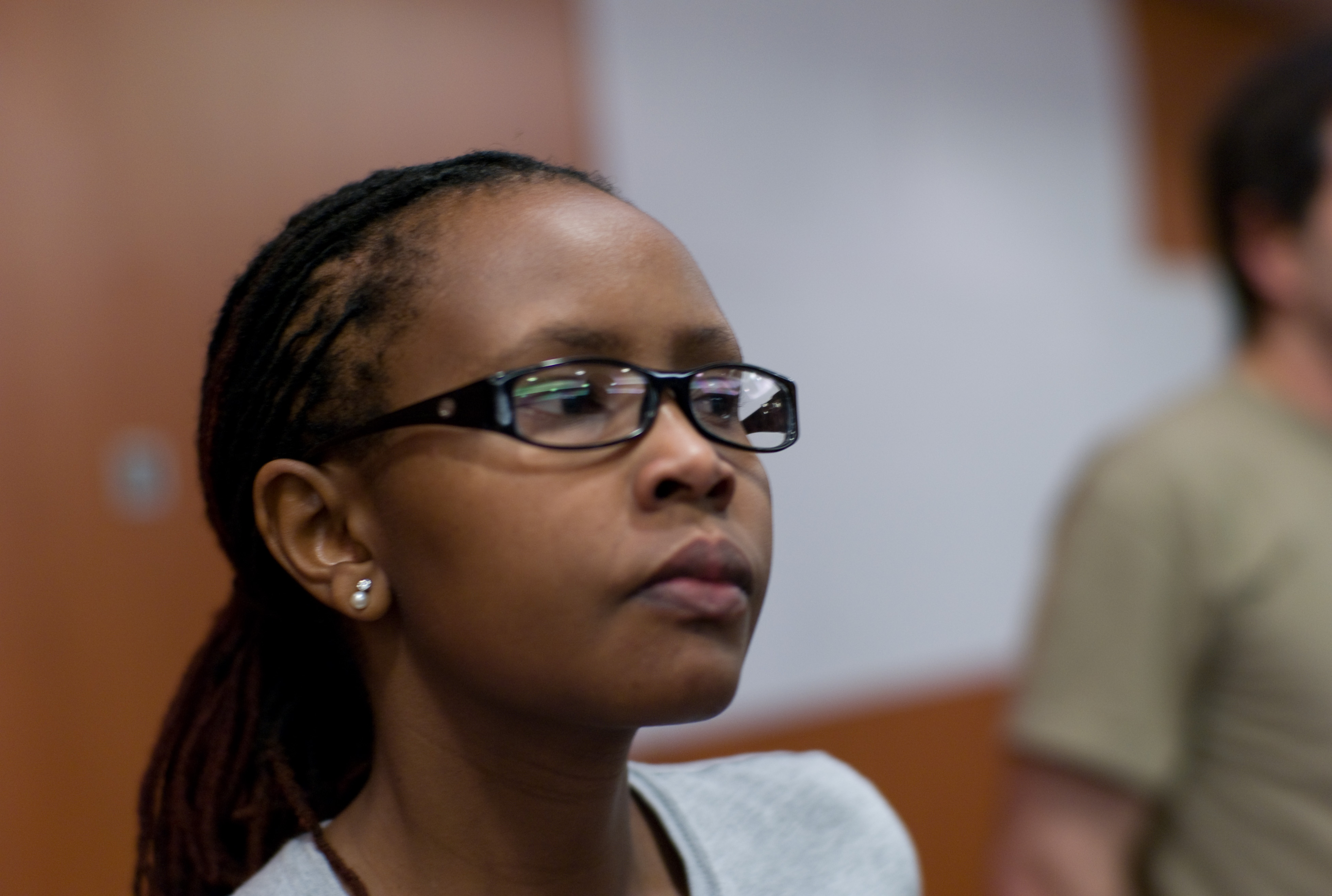
- Juliana Rotich: Meet BRCK, Internet Access Built for Africa, TED Talks, June 2013

== See also ==
- Ory Okolloh – Kenyan activist and co-founder of Ushahidi
- Dorcas Muthoni – Kenyan computer scientist and founder of AfChix
- Erik Hersman – co-founder of Ushahidi and iHub
- Njeri Rionge – Kenyan technology entrepreneur
