= IHub =

Organization

iHub
- An open space for the technologists, investors, tech companies and hackers in Nairobi.
- Formation: 2010
- Founder: Erik Hersman, David Kobia, Juliana Rotich
- Purpose: Hackerspace
- Location: Jahazi Building, 154 James Gichuru Road, Nairobi, Kenya
- Owner: Co-Creation Hub (CcHUB)
- Origin: Nairobi, Kenya
- CEO: Bosun Tijani
- Website: ihub.co.ke

iHub is a technology innovation hub and hackerspace located in Nairobi, Kenya. Founded in March 2010 by Erik Hersman, Juliana Rotich, David Kobia, and Ory Okolloh, it served as an open workspace and incubator for technologists, investors, researchers, and software developers. On 26 September 2019, iHub was acquired by the Lagos-based innovation center Co-Creation Hub (CcHUB), consolidating both organizations into a pan-African technology network under the leadership of CcHUB founder Bosun Tijani.

iHub was a pioneering tech hub in Africa, but in 2014 was one of many technology hubs across the continent, with a dozen in Nairobi in 2015, and NaiLab operating within the same building until March 2017.

== Facilities ==
iHub provides a space where members can receive mentorship, business support services, access to startup and product development related workshops and events, and the possibility of venture funding through connections with the local and international venture capital community. The space is a tech community facility with a focus on early stage entrepreneurs, web and mobile phone programmers, designers and researchers. It is part open community workspace (co-working), part vector for investors and venture capitalists, and part incubator.

=== MLab East Africa ===
MLab East Africa (stylised as m:lab) is an initiative that "aims to foster innovation and entrepreneurship within the Kenyan community, with a focus on Web and mobile services." It is not revenue generating for the iHub. It is a consortium of four organizations (eMobilis, World Wide Web Foundation, University of Nairobi, and iHub). It has had input from the World Bank Group's infoDev program, under its Digital Entrepreneurship Program that is "scaling Mobile Application Labs (mLabs) ... in Kenya, South Africa, and Senegal".

=== iHub UX Lab ===
The iHub UX lab is the first open user experience lab in Sub-Saharan Africa. The UX lab has a mission to develop a user-centered design culture in Africa by helping the local community learn human centered design methods that put the user at the centre of product development. As it stands, most solutions are still built with a tech-centric approach and therefore do not fully understand and design for the users' needs and context. Inevitably, most of these solutions therefore fail to meet the needs of the user and therefore have minimal or no adoption. The UX Lab was established to promote human-centered design (HCD) practices across Sub-Saharan Africa, offering design research, usability testing, and consultancy services for early-stage technology startups and software developers.

== Funding and ownership ==
iHub's launch was supported by grant funding from the Omidyar Network and Hivos, with initial operational support provided by open-source software project Ushahidi.

On 26 September 2019, Nigerian technology hub Co-Creation Hub (CcHUB) acquired iHub for an undisclosed amount. Following the acquisition, CcHUB Chief Executive Officer Bosun Tijani assumed executive oversight of iHub, steering its transition toward joint incubation programs, venture capital investments, and pan-African technology initiatives.

== Events ==
iHub has hosted community technology events, including BarCamp, Mobile Monday, Random Hacks of Kindness, and cybersecurity workshops.

The hub has hosted international technology leaders and executives for public discussions, including Internet pioneer Vint Cerf, former Yahoo CEO Marissa Mayer, Perl creator Larry Wall, former Apple CEO John Sculley, and Facebook co-founder Mark Zuckerberg, who visited iHub in September 2016 to meet with Kenyan developers and entrepreneurs.

== See also ==
- List of business incubators
- I-Hub
