= Kenya Vision 2030 =

Medium-term development programme in Kenya

- Ruwaza ya Kenya 2030
- The official logo of the project.

Development programme overview
- Formed: 10 June 2008
- Type: Development blueprint
- Jurisdiction: Government of Kenya
- Motto: Towards a globally competitive and prosperous nation
- Minister responsible: Prof. Njuguna Ndung'u, The National Treasury and Economic Planning, Victor Gichohi Githuku was appointed later to represent Youth, Marketing and Tourism
- Key document: Vision 2030 (Popular version); English; Swahili
- Website: www.vision2030.go.ke

Kenya Vision 2030 (Swahili: Ruwaza ya Kenya 2030) is a Kenyan development program, aiming to raise the average standard of living in Kenya to middle income by 2030. It was launched on 10 June 2008 by President Mwai Kibaki. Developed through "an all-inclusive and participatory stakeholder consultative process, involving Kenyans from all parts of the country," the Vision is based on three "pillars": Economic, Social, and Political. The Vision's adoption comes after the country's GDP growth went from 0.6% in 2002 to 6.1% in 2006, under Kibaki's Economic Recovery Strategy for Wealth and Employment Creation (ERS).

The Kenya Vision 2030 is to be implemented in successive five-year plans, with the first such plan covering the period 2008–2012. Under the Vision, Kenya expected to meet its Millennium Development Goals (MDGs) by the deadline in 2015, although this has not been achieved.

The Vision 2030 development process was launched by President Mwai Kibaki on 30 October 2006 when he instructed the National Vision Steering Committee to produce a medium-term plan with full details on the development programmes that would be implemented in the first five years after the ERS expires on 31 December 2007. A consultative approach was undertaken through workshops with stakeholders from all levels of the public service, the private sector, civil society, the media and NGOs while in rural areas, provincial consultative forums were also held throughout the country.

The objective of all these consultations was to provide an in-depth understanding of the country's development problems and the necessary strategies to achieve the 2030 goals.

A similar process and methodology was followed in identifying projects and priorities in the social and political pillars. Detailed analysis was carried out under a consultative process in order to come up with strategies capable of resolving the social and political problems that Kenyans face today. To arrive at workable solutions, the team of experts learned as much as they could from countries that have achieved rapid growth and also improved the lives of their people greatly in a span of 20–30 years, The team made extensive use of information available from the government, Kenya's private sector, civil society and universities.

== Foundations ==
The Vision 2030 strategy focus on reforms and development across 10 key sectors:

- Infrastructure.
- Science, Technology and Innovation.
- Public Sector Reforms.
- Tourism.
- Agriculture.
- Trade.
- Manufacturing.
- BPO (Business Process Outsourcing) & ICT (Information Communication & Technology).
- Financial Services.
- Education & Training.

== Pillars ==
=== Economic ===
This pillar seeks to improve the prosperity of all Kenyans through an economic development programme that covers the entirety of Kenya. It aims to achieve an average Gross Domestic Product (GDP) growth rate of 10 percent per annum until 2030. To achieve this target, Kenya is continuing with the tradition of macro-economic stability that has been established since 2002. It is also addressing other key constraints, notably, a low savings to GDP ratio, which can be alleviated by drawing in more remittances from Kenyans abroad, as well as increased foreign investment and overseas development assistance (ODA).

Delivering the country's ambitious growth aspirations required a rise of national savings from 17 percent in 2006 to about 30 percent in 2012. It was also found necessary to deal with a significant informal economy employing 75 percent of the country's workers. The informal sector is being supported in ways that will raise productivity and distribution and increase jobs, owner's incomes and public revenues. Furthermore, the country is continuing with the governance and institutional reforms necessary to accelerate economic growth. Other critical problems being addressed include poor infrastructure and high energy costs.

The key sectors highlighted below are being given priority as the key growth drivers for achievement of the economic pillar of Vision 2030:

- Wholesale and retail trade
- Manufacturing
- Agriculture and livestock
- Business process outsourcing
- Financial services
- Tourism
- Oil, gas and mineral resources
- Blue economy

It is notable that spheres of interest come with each government, but this has not necessarily been the case in Kenya. The administration of William Ruto picked five key economic deliverables characterized as "The Bottom-Up Economic Transformation Agenda (BETA)" which are entrenched in the Vision 2030 framework. These are:

1. Agriculture
2. Micro, Small and Medium Enterprise (MSME) economy
3. Housing and settlement
4. Healthcare
5. Digital Superhighway and Creative Economy

These key pillars were the result of the hotly contested elections of 2017 that led to an annulment of the Presidential vote by the country's Supreme Court led by Chief Justice Maraga. Notwithstanding, over 10,000 kilometers of road are to be tarmacked in the period 2013 to 2022 with 3000 kilometers in progress by 2018. Phase 1 of the modernisation of Kenya's railway system on the southern Corridor from Mombasa to Nairobi is complete, while phase 2 (Nairobi to Naivasha) is in progress as of May 2018; with the longest rail tunnel in Africa being located at Kibiko, Ngong in advanced stages. The tendering of the third phase is in progress.

Under LAPSSET, a key deliverable under Vision 2030, the Isiolo Airport is complete as of 2017, while Konza and Lamu Port have received renewed interest in 2018. Road works completed under Vision 2030 include Mombasa Road (with major funds still being pumped in), Thika Super Highway (commonly known as Kibaki Free Way due its convenience), Outerring Road, Southern Bypass, Eastern Bypass, and Northern Bypass. Others include expansions of the Ngong and Langata roads. Major malls with grade one offices in what has been characterized as public-private partnerships have been constructed and completed in Nairobi and its environs. This include Garden city and TRM on the Thika Superhighway, and Two Rivers Mall along the Northern Bypass and Limuru Road.

Even so, the advent of devolution with 47 county governments has thrust Kenya into an investment destination with individual counties competing to bring investors within their borders and/or regions. This has become a major catalyst for growth as county headquarters have become new centres of growth, even as key roads continue to be commissioned, as in the case of Marsabit, an oasis in a desert after completion of Isiolo-Marsabit to the Ethiopia border highway, which is a part of the Cape Cairo Pan African Highway. This, among many such regional projects in progress, is positioning every region in Kenya and the neighboring countries to profit from Vision 2030, a brainchild of former Kenyan president Mwai Kibaki.

Vision 2030 remains on course. However, perennial budget deficits continue to impede its completion. These have included major expansions of JKIA, Nairobi, Moi International Airport, Mombasa, Kisumu International Airport and Nairobi-Nakuru Highway, which are still in progress. Major roads in Kisumu, Mombasa and Nairobi are currently under major expansions in accordance with Vision 2030. Moreover, the expansion of infrastructure in both the Northern and Southern Transport Corridor is currently in progress.

This has included projects in power, with renewable energy taking centre stage with geothermal power plants in Ol Karia and Naivasha and wind farms in Ngong Hills, Turkana and Marsabit. A majority of the country relies on renewable energy sources, with the country eager to attract funds from international partners as the tightening of monetary policy becomes severe following the 2017 interest-capping regime in Kenya's banking sector. This has seen China emerge as the biggest holder of Kenyan foreign debt at more than 60% in May 2018 at over KSh700 billion/=.

Investments in technological hubs have led to Nairobi being called Africa's Silicon Savannah, with products such as M-pesa receiving global acclaim. Developments in ICT have seen government services and financial services become more inclusive with the introduction of services such as Huduma Centres and Lipa na Mpesa. This has made Kenya jump directly from an agricultural revolution to an information revolution within a decade. Industrialisation has received renewed focus, as part of Uhuru Kenyatta's Big Four Agenda. Exploitation of mineral wealth, with major discoveries in gold, oil, coal and rare earth deposits, among others, presents a big boost towards funding.

=== Social ===
Through this strategy, Kenya aims to build a just and cohesive society with social equity in a clean and secure environment. It, therefore, presents comprehensive social interventions aimed at improving the quality of life of all Kenyans and Kenyan residents. This strategy makes special provisions for Kenyans with various disabilities (PWDs) and previously marginalized communities. These policies (and those in the economic pillar) are equally anchored on an all-round adoption of science, technology and innovation (STI) as an implementation tool.

Key sectors:

- Education & training
- The health system and maternal health
- Water and sanitation
- The environment
- Housing and urbanization
- Gender, youth and vulnerable groups
- Equity and poverty elimination
- Reconciliation

=== Political ===
This aims to realize a democratic political system founded on issue-based politics that respects the rule of law, and protects the rights and freedoms of every individual in Kenyan society. It hopes to transform Kenya into a state in which equality is entrenched, irrespective of one's race, ethnicity, religion, gender, or socioeconomic status; a nation that respects and harnesses the diversity of its peoples' values, traditions, and aspirations for the benefit of all its citizens.

The political pillar vision for 2030 is "a democratic political system that is issue-based, people-centered, result-oriented and accountable to the public". An issue-based system is one in which political differences are about means to meet the widest public interest. "People-centered" goals refer to the system's responsiveness to the needs and rights of citizens, whose participation in all public policies and resource allocation processes are both fully appreciated and facilitated. A result-oriented system is stable, predictable and whose performance is based on measurable outcomes. An accountable system is one that is open and transparent and one that permits the free flow of information. This vision is expected to guarantee Kenya's attainment of the specific goals outlined under Vision 2030's economic and social pillars.

To meet objectives outlined in the economic and social pillars, Kenya's national governance system is being transformed and reformed to acquire high-level executive capability consistent with a rapidly industrializing country. The country is adopting a democratic decentralization process with substantial devolution in policy-making, public resource management, and revenue sharing through devolved funds. This has been achieved through the delivery of a new constitutional dispensation which came in effect in August 2010.

Transformation within Kenya's political governance system under Vision 2030 is expected to take place across six strategic initiatives, whose overarching visions, goals and specific strategies for 2012 are as follows:

- Rule of law
- Electoral & political processes
- Democracy and public service delivery
- Transparency and accountability
- Security, peacebuilding and conflict management

== Guiding principles ==
To ensure that economic, social and political governance gains made under the Vision are neither reversed nor lost as a result of change in ruling parties, the following eight governance principles will be adhered to:

1. Constitutional supremacy: Supremacy of the constitution shall be respected at all times. Political and property rights are guaranteed in the Bill of Rights.
2. Sovereignty of the people: The government derives all its just powers from the people it governs.
3. Equality of citizens: Kenya will not discriminate any citizen on the basis of gender, race, tribe, religion or ancestral origin.
4. National values, goals and ideology: Kenyans shall formulate and adopt a core set of national values, goals and a political ideology supportive of Vision 2030, these will include acknowledgement of the significance of God to the Kenyan people and an affirmation of the religious, cultural and ethnic diversity of Kenyans. It will also affirm the indivisibility of Kenya as a nation and her commitment to democracy and the rule of law.
5. A viable political party system: Kenya aims at a political party system that will be guided by policy and ideological differences rather than region of ethnicity. Founding of political parties on religious, linguistic, racial, ethnic, gender, corporate or regional basis will be prohibited. All political parties will be obliged to subscribe to a legally-binding Code of Conduct. There will be a clear definition of circumstances under which a party may be de-registered or reinstated. The delegation of state functions to (or the use of state resources by) political parties will not be permitted. Political parties will be required to publish their manifestos before participating in elections.
6. Public participation in governance: Kenyans shall appreciate the values of tolerance and respect for differences in opinion in a competitive society.
7. Separation of powers: Legislature, the Executive and Judiciary institutions are independently functioning in a manner that enhances the implementation of Vision 2030.
8. Decentralisation: Vision 2030 uses devolved funds to strengthen decentralization of development projects at the community level.

== Implementation ==
A Semi Autonomous Government Agency (SAGA) with the requisite capacity has been established to oversee the implementation of all the Vision 2030 projects. The agency works closely in collaboration with public and private sector, civil society and other relevant stakeholder groups. The strategies to deliver the 10% annual growth by 2012 is being executed through flagship projects across the priority sectors in all the three pillars of the Vision. The projects are original large-scale initiatives that look beyond their immediate locality. Flagship projects form part of the national development with complementary projects being undertaken in line with the medium-term plans, the budget outlook paper, and the medium-term expenditure framework.

During the life of the Vision, strategies and action plans are expected to be systematically reviewed and adjusted every 5 years in order to respond to the changing environment. Following the expiry of the ERS in December 2007, the first part of Vision 2030 is now being implemented under the 2008–2012 plan.

On 23 July 2013, the Ministry of Information and Communication launched the National Broadband Strategy, with the stated goal "Broadband connectivity that is always on and that delivers a minimum of 5 mbps to homes and businesses for high speed access to voice, data, video and applications for development."

== Vision Delivery Secretariat ==
The Kenyan Government established the Vision 2030 Delivery Secretariat (VDS), which provides leadership and direction towards the realization of Vision 2030 goals. The Secretariat is managed by the Director-General under guidance of the Vision 2030 Delivery Board (VDB), which plays an advisory role.
