= SketchPad =

Coworking space in Chicago for Jewish nonprofit organizations

- Headquarters: 4411 N. Ravenswood Ave; Suite 300; Chicago, Illinois 60640, United States
- Number of locations: 1
- Key people: Irene Lehrer Sandalow
- Products: coworking space
- Website: www.sketchpadchicago.org

SketchPad is a coworking space in Chicago for Jewish nonprofits.

== History ==
Founded by Irene Lehrer Sandalow, SketchPad is part of a limited collection of global Jewish-themed co-working spaces, including New York, Encinitas (California), London, and Melbourne. The concept took shape in 2015, a year after Lehrer Sandalow relocated to Chicago with her husband. Engaged in remote work on a project for the Union for Reform Judaism during that period, she conceived the idea of SketchPad. Following collaborative discussions with local Jewish organizations and successful grant acquisitions, she established SketchPad in 2017.

Susan Morrow is a board chair for SketchPad.
