= Firmspace =

American coworking space operator

- Company type: Private
- Industry: Coworking
- Founded: 2016; 10 years ago
- Founder: Matt Ferstler
- Headquarters: Austin, Texas
- Number of locations: Austin, Denver, Houston, Atlanta
- Area served: United States
- Key people: Kenny Kane (CEO); Matt Ferstler (President)
- Number of employees: 15 (2025)
- Website: firmspace.com

Firmspace is an American coworking space operator with headquarters in Austin, Texas.

== History ==
Firmspace was co-founded in 2016 by Matt Ferstler in Austin, Texas. It opened its first facility in Austin in November 2017. Following its launch, Firmspace began expanding to other U.S. cities. A location in Denver was established in 2018, followed by a Houston branch in early 2019. In September 2020, its fourth location was opened in Atlanta, Georgia.

In October 2022, Kenny Kane became the chief executive officer (CEO) of Firmspace after previously serving as chief operating officer from 2020 to 2022.

== Operations ==
Firmspace operates four coworking spaces located in Austin, Denver, Houston, and Atlanta. During the COVID-19 pandemic, Firmspace began describing its private offices as a safer alternative to open-plan workspaces. Its business model is centered on its "proworking" concept, which provides office suites rather than open-plan desks with standard facilities and focus on privacy.
