= Konza =

Konza mar refer to:

- Konza Prairie Biological Station, Kansas
- Konza, Kenya
  - Konza Technopolis
