= Konsa =

Family name

Konsa is the surname of the following notable people:

- Amalie Konsa (1873–1949), Estonian stage and actress and singer
- Ezri Konsa (born 1997), English footballer
- Oliver Konsa (born 1985), Estonian footballer

== See also ==
- Konza (disambiguation)
