= Coworker (company) =

Online marketplace for coworking spaces

- Company type: Private
- Industry: Coworking spaces
- Founded: 2015; 11 years ago
- Founder: Sam Marks, Leanne Beesley
- Headquarters: Toronto, Canada & Barcelona, Spain
- Products: Global Pass
- Members: 18,500
- Website: www.coworker.com

Coworker is an online marketplace and access solution for discovering and booking coworking spaces and flexible offices around the world. It was founded in 2015 by Leanne Beesley and current president Sam Marks. The company has offices in the United States, Canada, Spain, and Thailand, with its registration in the United States. By 2021, the company recorded 18,500 coworking spaces in 172 countries in its network.

== History and funding ==
Leanne Beesley and Sam Marks founded Coworker in 2015. The company provides an online portal that allows users to search for coworking spaces around the globe. As of 2020, the community includes more than 18,500 coworking spaces in 172 countries on six continents. The team is distributed in Mexico, United Kingdom, Ukraine, Thailand, and Malaysia with headquarters in both Toronto, Canada and Barcelona, Spain.

By 2017, Coworker has raised $1.2 million from angel investors and partners, including Jeff Natland of online payments company Neteller and Constant Tedder, founder of online game developer Jagex and owner of The Hive coworking spaces.

In January 2018, the company acquired Coworking Insights, an online publication for coworking industry professionals that publishes the latest trends, data, and news. The company also operates the Coworking Insights podcast.

As of April 2019, the company announced their partnership with TEDx, allowing Coworker's member coworking spaces to become designated sites for TEDx presentations and speakers.

In May 2019, Coworker launched a new partnership with OfficeRnD, the leading management software provider for coworking spaces, serviced offices, and business centers.

As of 2019, Coworker is the only database of coworking spaces that offers an annual global awards recognition, encouraging remote workers to vote for their favorite spaces around the world. The Coworker Members’ Choice Awards is now in its third year.

The company was described as an "innovation to watch" by the Financial Times in 2015.

The company collaborated with DeskMag, Coworking Africa, Coworking Insights, and Venia Business Hub to host the first Nigerian Coworking Conference held in IMAX Filmhouse, Lagos in 2017.

In October 2019, Coworker opened up its European Headquarters in Barcelona, Spain.

In 2020, Coworker launched its global access solution, Global Pass, which provides frictionless access to thousands of coworking spaces under a pass membership model. Global Pass is powered by the Coworker app.

== See also ==
- Office sharing
- Coworking
- Coworking Space Toronto
- Hot desking
