= Joseph Mucheru =

Kenyan civil servant

Joseph Wakaba Mucheru
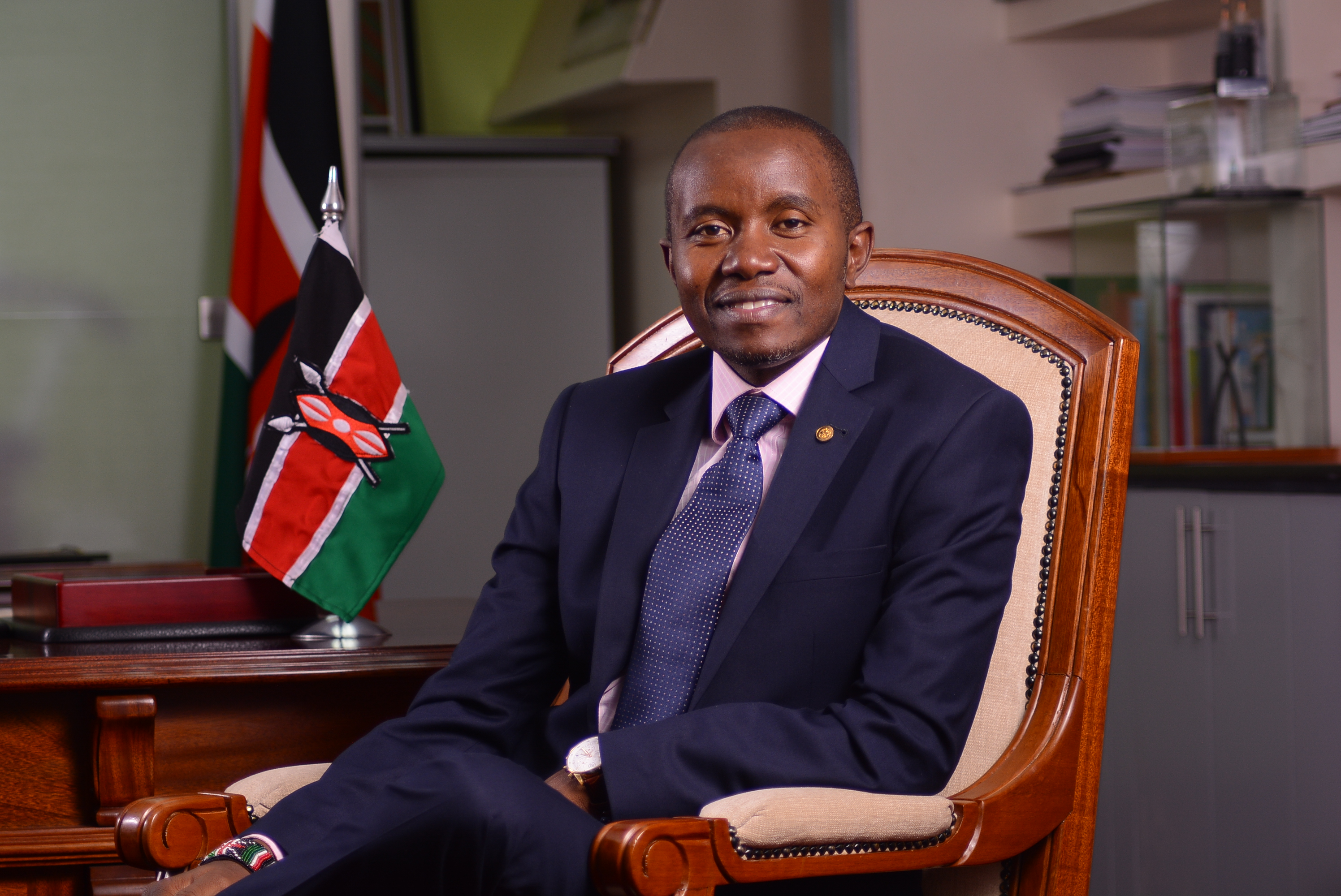

Cabinet Secretary for Ministry of Information and Communications (Kenya)
- In office 2015–2022
- President: Uhuru Kenyatta
- Succeeded by: Eliud Owalo

Personal details
- Born: August 28, 1968 (age 57) Limuru
- Citizenship: Kenyan
- Education: Stanford University Graduate School of Business
- Alma mater: City University London. (Bsc.Economics & Computer Science) Lenana School
- Awards: Elder of the Order of the Golden Heart (EGH), The Moran of the Order of the Burning Spear (M.B.S)
- Website: https://ict.go.ke

Joseph Wakaba Mucheru EGH was the former Kenyan Cabinet Secretary in the Ministry of Information and Communications. He was appointed by the then President of Kenya Uhuru Kenyatta. Joe held that office since from 2015 to 2022.

== Early life and education ==
Mucheru attended the Nairobi Primary School between 1977 and 1982, his high school education was at Lenana School between 1983 (form 1) and 1988 (form 6). He attended the Business Executive Programme from Stanford University Graduate School of Business in 2008. He holds a (B Sc. (Hons)) in Economics & Computer Science from City University London. He was awarded the Moran of the order of the burning spear in December 2010 by the President of the Republic of Kenya, Mwai Kibaki. He is a member of the Africa Leadership Network, The National Prayer Breakfast, and the East African Business Summit.

== Career ==
He is a former Google Sub-Sahara Africa Lead based in the Google Nairobi office. He was Google's first Sub-Saharan employee and was key to setting up Google's presence in Africa from 2007. Before joining Google he worked at Wananchi Online, a company he co-founded in 1999, in various roles at the company including Chief Technology Officer and Chief Executive Officer.

Joseph Mucheru has been on the boards of many companies and businesses, including the M-Pesa Foundation Academy advisory board, the payments platform BitPesa (now AZA Finance), and GiveDirectly, which aims to cut out the intermediary and ensure that donations go straight to the intended recipients.

== Personal life ==
Mucheru married Aida Wambui in 2005 under Kikuyu traditional laws. The marriage lasted for ten years, Wambui filed for divorce on June 29, 2015, claiming her marriage to Mucheru had irretrievably broken down and that their union was a “sham without feelings.”
