= Kenya Advanced Institute of Science and Technology =

Planned public university in Kenya

- Type: Public University
- Established: 2021; 5 years ago
- Academic affiliations: Korea Advanced Institute of Science and Technology
- Students: 200 (Pioneer class)
- Undergraduates: 0
- Postgraduates: 200
- Location: Konza Technology City, Machakos County, Kenya; 1°40′27″S 37°10′50″E
- Campus: Urban
- Website: kenya-aist.ac.ke

Kenya Advanced Institute of Science and Technology is a postgraduate-only public university established in 2021. The establishment of the university was aimed at meeting the shortage of highly skilled engineers, needed in the country and the region, to drive Kenya into an industrialized nation by 2030.

== Location ==
The university is under development on a 22 acres (9 ha) plot of land in Konza Technology City, in Machakos County, close to the county's borders with Makueni County and Kajiado County. This is approximately 70 kilometres (43 mi), by road, south-east of the central business district of Nairobi, Kenya's capital city, along the Nairobi–Mombasa Road.

== Overview ==
The Government of Kenya, in collaboration with the county governments of Machakos, Makueni and Kajiado counties, and the Konza Technopolis Development Authority (KoTDA), plan to establish an advanced institute of science and technology. The institute is planned to be an all-postgraduate research public university.

After competitive bidding, the Korea Advanced Institute of Science and Technology won the bid to design the university curriculum. A consortium of two Korean architectural and engineering firms of "Samoo" and "Sunjin", won the bid to design and construct the university campus. Those contracts were signed in November 2018.

== Construction and funding ==
Construction is funded by a KSh10 billion (US$72 million) loan from the Export–Import Bank of Korea to the Kenyan government. The facilities are expected to be ready in 2021, with the first intake of 200 postgraduate students starting classes in 2022.

== Academics ==
The university will start with six initial departments:

- Mechanical Engineering
- Electrical and Electronic Engineering
- ICT Engineering
- Chemical Engineering
- Civil Engineering and
- Agricultural Biotechnology.

== See also ==
- KAIST
- Education in Kenya
