= Christchurch Recovery Map =

The Christchurch Recovery Map, also known as eq.org.nz, was a short-lived website providing crowdsourced information about the Christchurch earthquake of 22 February 2011. The site aggregated information via email, tweets with an #eqnz hashtag, SMS and a locally hosted web form. The site was built with open source tools and active support from CrisisCommons and Ushahidi.

As well as providing information, the volunteers hosting the site provided much of the technical infrastructure behind the Student Volunteer Army. The site became a major source of public information. Within its first week of operation, it had received approximately 100,000 unique visitors. The site is listed as a credible source of information by New Zealand's two main news sites, stuff.co.nz and nzherald.co.nz, as well as Google Crisis Response's and the Trademe's website. As mainstream agencies responded to the quake, other forms of communication became established and the need for a grass roots website subsided. The website is no longer updated as the normal information channels have resumed, and recommends an alternative website.

Despite complaints, the website does work on the Wayback Machine, until the screenshot on 2 July 2011.
