= NaiLab =

Kenyan startup incubator

Nailab
- Formation: March 1, 2010; 16 years ago
- Legal status: active
- Purpose: Business incubator
- Location: Nairobi, Kenya
- Key people: Sam Gichuru; Anna Chojnacka; Bart Lacroix
- Website: www.nailab.co.ke

Nailab is a Kenyan startup incubator, located in Nairobi, that was founded in 2010 by Tonee Ndung, Bart Lacroix, Sam Gichuru (CEO) and Anna Chojnakha,. In 2012 Tonee Ndungu left and a few years later founded Kytabu, an EdTech company based in Nairobi, Kenya. The company incubated technology-based companies and offered 3–6 months entrepreneurship programs with a focus on growing innovative technology driven ideas. in their office on Bishop Magua Center, Ngong road.

As CEO, Sam Gichuru make the objective of Nailab to lower the entry barriers for ICT entrepreneurs who want to start and scale their businesses in Kenya.

Initial funding for Nailab came from angels Sam Gichuru, Bart Lacroix and Anna Chojnakha. It was later funded by partnership with 1%Club.

Already, 100's of startups have graduated from the Nailab, including Tusqee, a mobile app that allows schools to send children's grades to their parents by SMS, KejaHunt, an online house hunting platform that helps the low and middle income earners find affordable housing and MyOrder, an app that allow street vendors to open their own mobile web shop, allowing customers to order and pay by mobile phone.

Nailab Secured a $1.6 Million Tech Incubation project from the Government of Kenya, the initiative of the Ministry of Information and Communications through the World Bank. It is funded by the Kenya Transparency and Infrastructure Project which was spearheaded by the Kenya ICT Board (KICTB).

Nailab Mentorship Platform, launched in 2026 by the Kenyan startup incubator Nailab, is a comprehensive mentorship infrastructure platform designed as "the operating system for mentorship programs across Africa." It enables organizations, mentors, and youth entrepreneurs to efficiently design, manage, and scale mentorship initiatives through features such as custom-branded application forms, multi-stage review pipelines, intelligent skill-based matching, automated cohort management, session scheduling, goal tracking, real-time KPI dashboards, and grant disbursement tools—all tailored to African contexts with support for local time zones and donor reporting.

Building on Nailab's decade-plus experience since 2010 in startup incubation and acceleration, the platform has reportedly unlocked over $100 million for founders and supported more than 1,000 entrepreneurs through 100+ programs, aiming to streamline impact measurement and connect participants with funding opportunities from partners like Mastercard Foundation, USAID, and UNFPA.

== See also ==
- IHub
