= Anca Mosoiu =

Technical consultant and web developer

Anca Moșoiu
- Occupation: Technical consultant
- Known for: Founder of Tech Liminal

Anca Moșoiu (born 1973) is a technical consultant and web developer who established the Oakland, California co-working space Tech Liminal in 2009. She is credited with helping to build the tech industry in Oakland. She has been described as a "tech guru". She has worked in the business applications industry for more than 15 years at companies such as Razorfish, Sony, Juniper Networks, and Cisco systems.

== Early life ==
Mosoiu moved to the United States from Romania with her family in 1983 when she was 9 years old. Her family had been granted political asylum "before the revolution toppled the Soviet-era autocrat Nicolae Ceausescu". She grew up in Oakland attending local middle schools.

Mosoiu attended Massachusetts Institute of Technology, and earned her bachelor's degree in computer science in 1995.

== Tech Liminal ==
As a technical consultant Mosoiu spent a lot of time traveling and in hotel rooms. Because she wanted to work with people and be part of a community, Mosoiu founded Tech Liminal. Tech Liminal was the first technology co-working space in Oakland.

"It's easier to have more impact in Oakland with little more than gumption," Mosoiu said. "It feels like we're all in this together."
