= Uchaguzi =

- Founded: 2010
- Type: Community Initiative
- Location: Kenya
- Region served: Global
- Origin: Nairobi, Kenya
- Founders: Ushahidi, Hivos INFONET
- Volunteers: 150-250
- Website: Uchaguzi Website

Uchaguzi is a joint initiative spearheaded by Ushahidi in 2010 to monitor the Kenyan constitutional referendum. Ushahidi collaborated with the Hivos Foundation, the Constitution and Reform Education Consortium (CRECO), INFONET, and the Canadian International Development Agency (CIDA) to develop an ICT platform, which enables citizens, the civil society, election observers, law enforcement agencies and humanitarian response agencies to monitor election incidents of significance using any technology at their disposal.

The initiative has since successfully been implemented in the 2010 Tanzanian general elections, the 2011 Zambian general elections and in the 2013 Kenyan general elections.

== Background ==
In 2010, Ushahidi collaborated with the Hivos Foundation, the Constitution & Reform Education Consortium (CRECO), the Canadian International Development Agency (CIDA) and SODNET to create the Uchaguzi-Kenya election incidence reporting platform that is closely based on the Ushahidi crowd sourcing software.

One of the resolutions of the meeting was that a programme entitled "Election Watch for East Africa 2010 – 2013" be developed. The Constitutional Referendum in Kenya was seen as a pre-test of the tools and methods to be used in monitoring the upcoming electoral processes in the East African region (Tanzania – October 2010, Uganda – March 2011 and Kenya - March 2013).

The platform of Uchaguzi was thus established, a short code was sourced and popularized throughout the country, and 550 observers were trained and deployed in identified constituencies. The result was a momentous data and information flow which instantaneously portrayed the state of Kenya before during and after the referendum.

2013 Kenyan General Elections

Uchaguzi aims to help Kenyans have a free, fair, peaceful and credible general election. Its key strategy is to increase the transparency and accountability of the electoral process through active citizen participation in the electoral cycles. Uchaguzi's strategy revolves around connecting civil society and citizen information to respond to electoral issues rapidly.

Through its reporting platform, Uchaguzi enables unprecedented collaboration between the Kenyan citizenry, election observers, humanitarian response agencies, the civil society, community-based organisations, law enforcement agencies and digital humanitarians to monitor the 2013 general elections in near real-time.

Uchaguzi went live on 2 March 2013 in readiness for the 4 March General election. The key components were:

- Data: the main focus of Uchaguzi and the source of most of the reports is ordinary citizen. We want people to send us any information on the election/electoral process that they feel is significant
- Verification: the process through which Uchaguzi evaluates information and determines how credible it is
- Response: Amplifying verified information to organisations and individuals who can intervene positively and monitoring that response to measure its effectiveness.
