= Konza, Kenya =

Town in Machakos County, Kenya

Coordinates: 01°45′00″S 37°07′00″E

Konza is a small town in Makueni County, Kenya. It is located 40 kilometres (25 mi) south-east of Nairobi, the Kenyan capital.

Konza is located in Kimutwa location of Central division of Makueni County. Konza is part of Machakos municipality and Machakos Town Constituency.

== Transport ==
Konza is a junction on the Kenya Railways network. Konza is located along Mombasa - Nairobi railway, and branch line to Magadi diverts at Konza.

== Technopolis ==
Konza will also be host to the proposed Konza Technopolis.

== See also ==
- Transport in Kenya
- Railway stations in Kenya
- Konza Technopolis
