= Office sharing =

Office sharing is a concept that allows companies that own or manage an office that has redundant office space to share or rent the workstations or self-contained units to smaller companies looking for flexible workspace. This creates revenue for the company that runs the office, and provides a cheap, flexible alternative for companies looking for an office outside of their home. The main benefit of sharing an office is that it provides a more dynamic environment for both companies involved and access to new markets.

However, sharing office space does come with some problems of its own:

- Higher office management costs (cleaning services, printer ink, office supplies and so on)
- Faster wear and tear of office equipment
- Potential NDA issues if the space isn't properly divided
- Setup costs (dividing the space with fake walls)
- Management Software costs (resource management, reception desk software, meeting room management and so on)

The arrangement can be particularly sensitive in the case of attorneys and MDs - in such cases, a legally-binding Office Sharing Agreement should be carefully considered and redacted.

Office Sharing is similar to Coworking, though coworking spaces tend to include more tenants, a broader range of amenities and a stronger emphasis on community and networking.

== See also ==
- Sublease
- Shared services
- Coworking spaces
