= I-Hub =

Indian business incubator

Innovation Hub
- Gujarat Student Startup and Innovation Hub
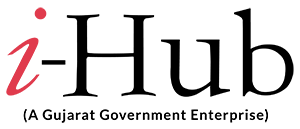
- Abbreviation: I-Hub
- Formation: 2019
- Type: Non-Profit Governmental Organization
- Legal status: Active
- Purpose: Business incubator
- Headquarters: Ahmedabad, Gujarat, India
- Region served: Gujarat
- Key people: Hiranmay Mahanta (CEO)
- Website: ihubgujarat.in

I-Hub (Innovation Hub) is an innovation intermediary and business incubator based in Ahmedabad, India. i-Hub was established under the Student Startup Innovation Policy (SSIP) by the Gujarat government's education department to encourage partnerships between prospective investable businesses and the India Accelerator.

i-Hub Gujarat has successfully incubated 840+ Startups, and the Education Department, Government of Gujarat has extended the Student Startup and Innovation Policy (SSIP 2.0) & allocated a corpus of ₹500 Crores to support early-stage student innovators and startups to develop their prototypes and venture into creative projects.

The complex was built under the Student Startup and Innovation Policy (SSIP 2.0) in 1.5 million square feet of space for startups and corporate space. Up to 500 start-ups can be housed at once in this Rs 98-crore project, which provides amenities to strengthen Gujarat's startup ecosystem. It is a five-story building that provides co-working space, networking facilities, 360-degree mentoring support, funding assistance, support for intellectual property as well as internship opportunities to students.

== History ==
A Memorandum of Understanding (MoU) was signed by the Gujarat Student Startup and Innovation Hub (i-Hub) and India Accelerator with the aim of establishing and selecting an early-stage startup pipeline that can receive mentorship, support, and funding from investors. In order to support and nurture the startup ecosystem in India, with a particular focus on Gujarat, India Accelerator, the country's only accelerator partnered with GAN, has teamed up with the state of Gujarat's dynamic incubation facility, i-Hub.

The construction project was given a two-year deadline and got underway in 2020. Following the failure to meet the January 2022 deadline, the state government declared its intention to take office on May 1, 2022. Later, the new date of May 1, 2023, was declared. The state's Education Department established the incubation center under the Student Startup and Innovation Policy (SSIP), and it was housed in a temporary 20,000 sq ft campus at the Knowledge Consortium of Gujarat (KCG) during the work being done on the new campus.

On 5 December 2023, the Gujarat Chief Minister inaugurated the 1.50 lakh square foot Gujarat Students Startup & Innovation Hub (i-Hub) complex, which can house 500 startups operating out of one room.

== Support Schemes ==
i-Hub, Gujarat under SSIP 2.0 has many schemes to support startup from the Ideation phase, i-Hub can support a Startup right from the Ideation phase up until Market Ready product. Currently i-Hub focuses on its flagship support scheme known as Startup Srujan in which innovators and startups gets grant from ₹2.5 Lakhs up until ₹10 Lakh.

i-Hub currently has 14 such support programs to help startup grow the programs are : Startup Srujan, M2M (Mind To Market), WEstart, Startup Grow, Startup Sathi, Startup Saksham, Startup Manak, Startup Prashansa, Startup Mart, Startup Goonj, SSIP Samajh, Startup Samarth, Startup Engage, Startup Clinic

== Co-working Space ==
i-Hub Gujarat provides co-working space to startups to setup their offices with facilities like Wi-Fi, Desks, Parking, Reception, Workspace, CCTV Surveillance and Networking Opportunities with other Startups.

i-Hub also frequently arranges mentorship sessions and support sessions which can help startups connect with industry and experts.

== See also ==
- List of business incubators
