= Coworking =

Sharing of office space

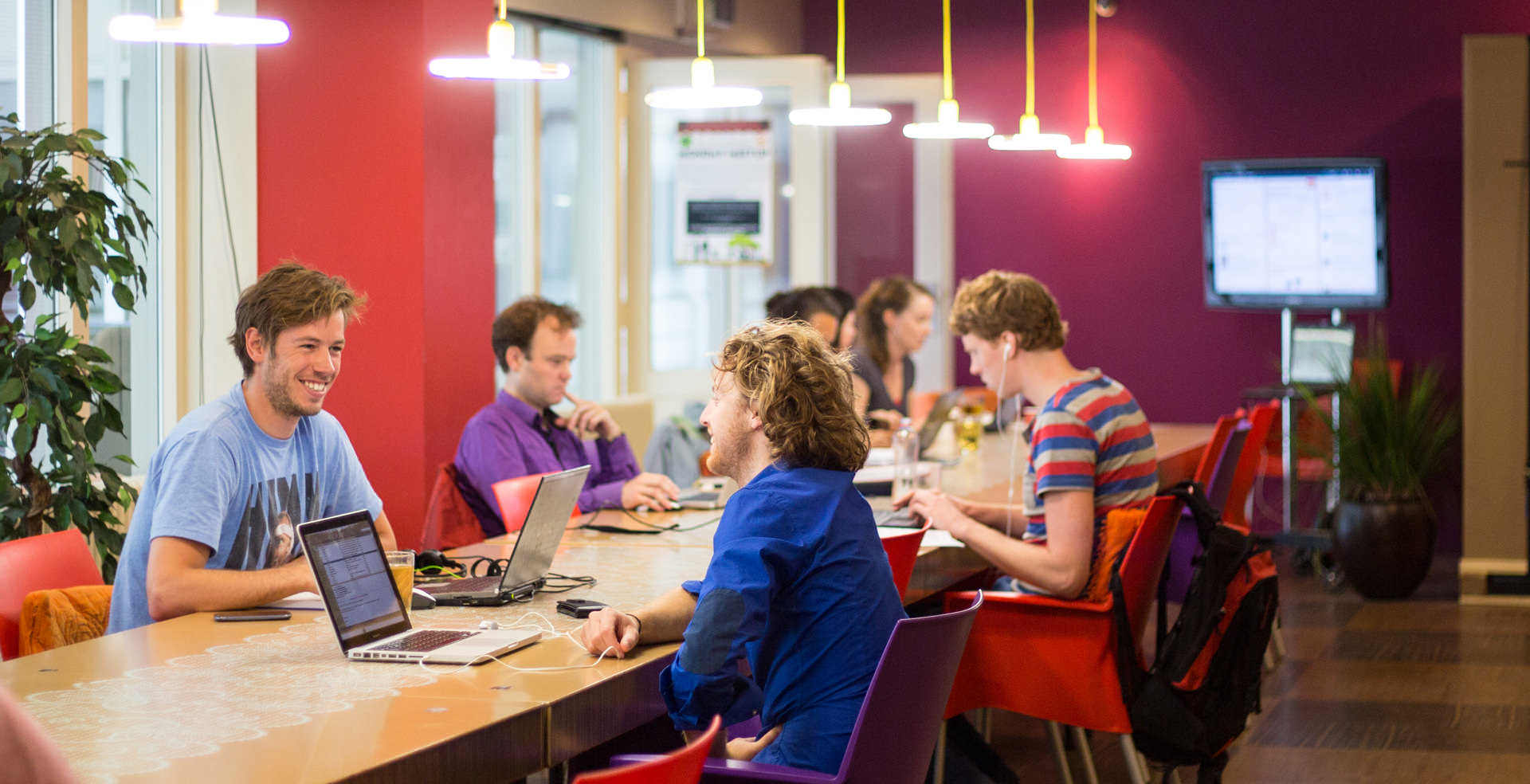
A coworking space in the Netherlands

Coworking is an arrangement in which workers for different companies, or those who are self-employed, share an office space. It allows cost savings and convenience through the use of common infrastructures, such as equipment, utilities and receptionist and custodial services, and in some cases refreshments and parcel acceptance services. It is attractive to independent contractors, independent scientists, remote workers, digital nomads, and people who travel frequently. Additionally, coworking helps workers avoid the feeling of social isolation they may experience while remote working or traveling and eliminate distractions in home office. Most coworking spaces charge membership dues. Major companies that provide coworking space and serviced offices include WeWork, IWG plc, Industrious, and Impact Hub.

== Types ==
Coworking is not only about providing a physical place, but also about establishing a community. Its rapid growth has been seen as a possible way for city planners to address the decline of high street retail in urban centres. Its benefits can already be experienced outside of the physical spaces, and it is recommended to start with building a coworking community first before considering opening a coworking place. However, some coworking places have no community building; they just get a part of an existing one by combining their opening with an event which attracts their target group.

Coworking tends to fall into two sides: Those that are real-estate-centric (all about selling desks and offices first) while others are community-centric (focused on building community that happens to also have offices or desks). Players target freelance professionals, remote workers, and small to medium enterprises (SMEs) who need a space and seek a community with a collaborative spirit. Customers also often benefit from professional services such as printing or incorporation or consulting.

Coworking is distinct from business accelerators, business incubators, and executive suites. These spaces do not fit into the coworking model because they often miss the social, collaborative, and informal aspects of the process. In coworking, management practices are closer to that of a cooperative, including a focus on community rather than profit. Some coworking participants are also involved in an unconference such as BarCamp.

Some coworking spaces are geared towards particular niches. For example, CoWorking With Wisdom, in Berkeley, California, combines coworking with meditation, mindfulness, and yoga programs, The Wing was founded for "the advancement of a certain type of woman", and Work and Play in South Orange, New Jersey has onsite childcare for entrepreneurial parents. Coworking spaces with a religious aspect include Epiphany Space, a Los Angeles space for artists, and SketchPad, a Chicago space for Jewish not-for-profit organizations.

== History ==
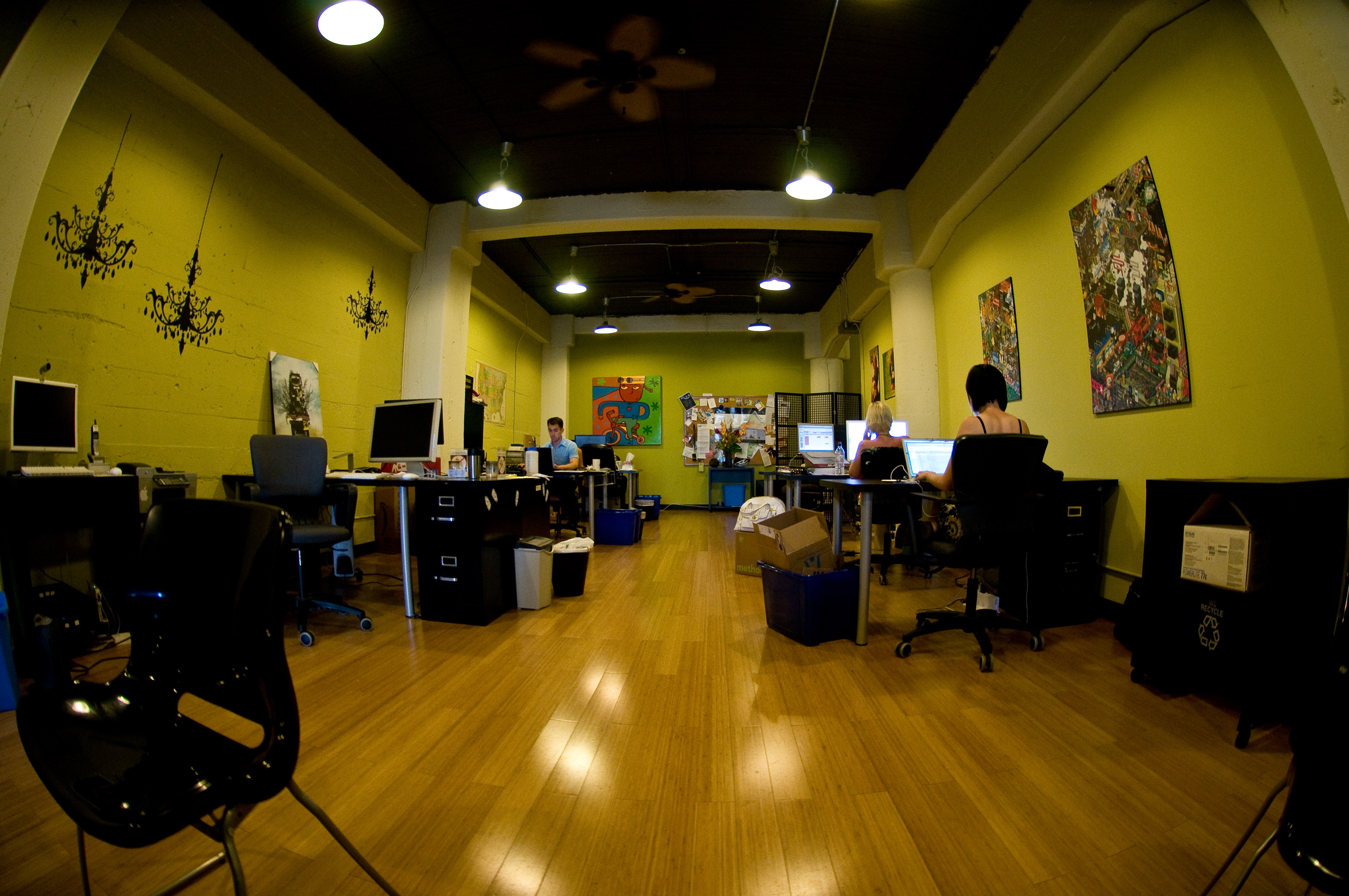
Citizen Space in San Francisco

Between 2006 and 2015, a few studies showed that the number of coworking spaces and available seats had roughly doubled each year. Coworking was preceded by European hacker spaces of the 1990s, where programmers would exchange skills and best practices.

Some coworking places were developed by remote workers and entrepreneurs seeking an alternative to working in coffeehouses and cafes, or to isolation in independent or home offices. Another major factor that drives demand for coworking is the growing role of independent contractors, digital nomads, and remote or hybrid employees.

=== In Asia Pacific ===
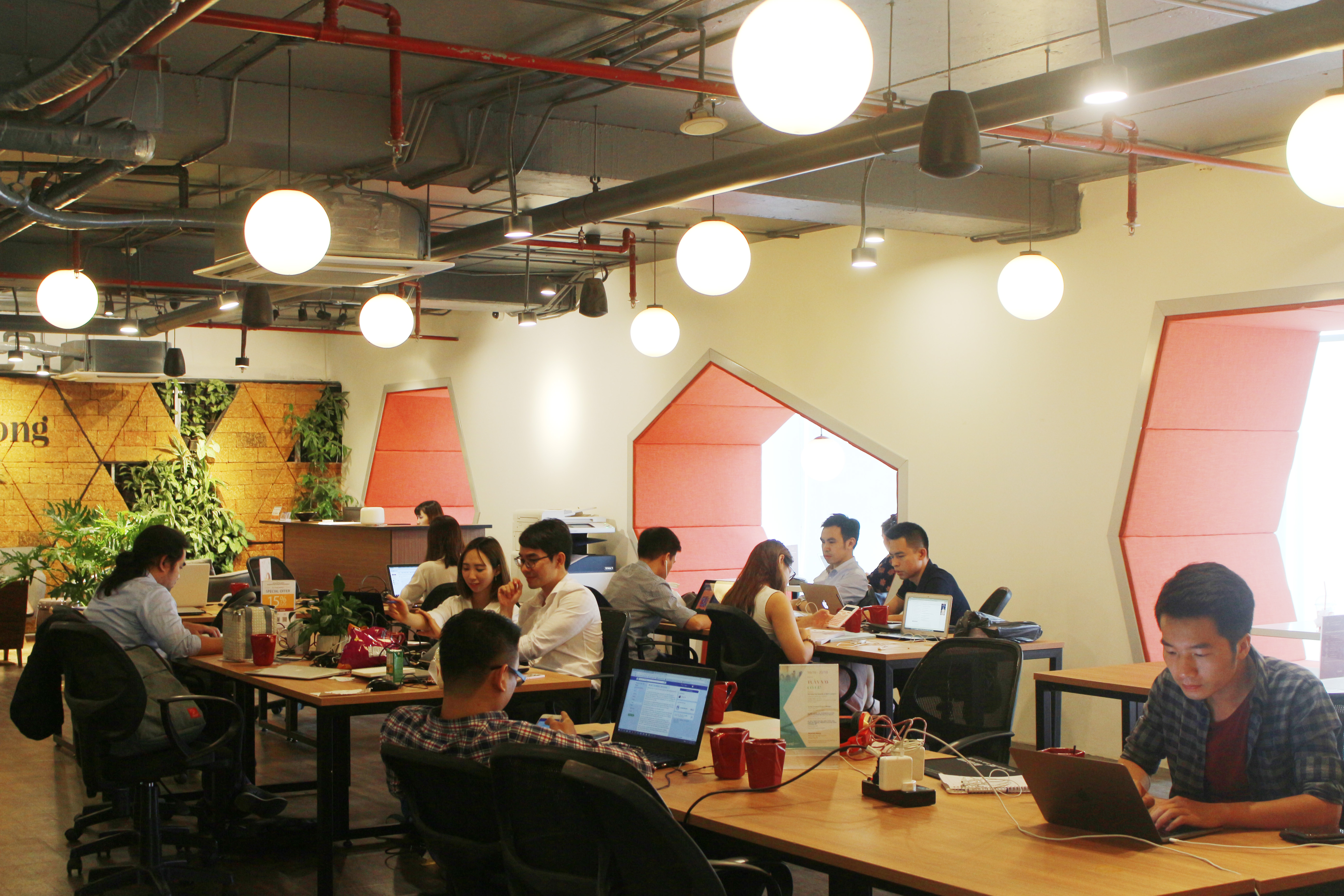
Toong's design in Hanoi is a blend of cultural features and modern details.

Coworking in Asia has become very popular as space is limited in regions like China, Hong Kong, India, the Philippines, Saudi Arabia, Singapore, Taiwan, and Vietnam. The major metropolitan cities in each of these regions are every day coming up with new coworking ideas and spaces, promoting emerging startups and business to adopt the trend. Research from commercial brokerage firm JLL found that flexible work space in Asia-Pacific, including both serviced offices and coworking, surged 150% from 2014 to 2017.

In Pacific countries such as Australia and New Zealand, coworking has been made popular as the prices of commercial spaces and bills rise, with coworking being up to 25% cheaper for most freelancers and businesses.

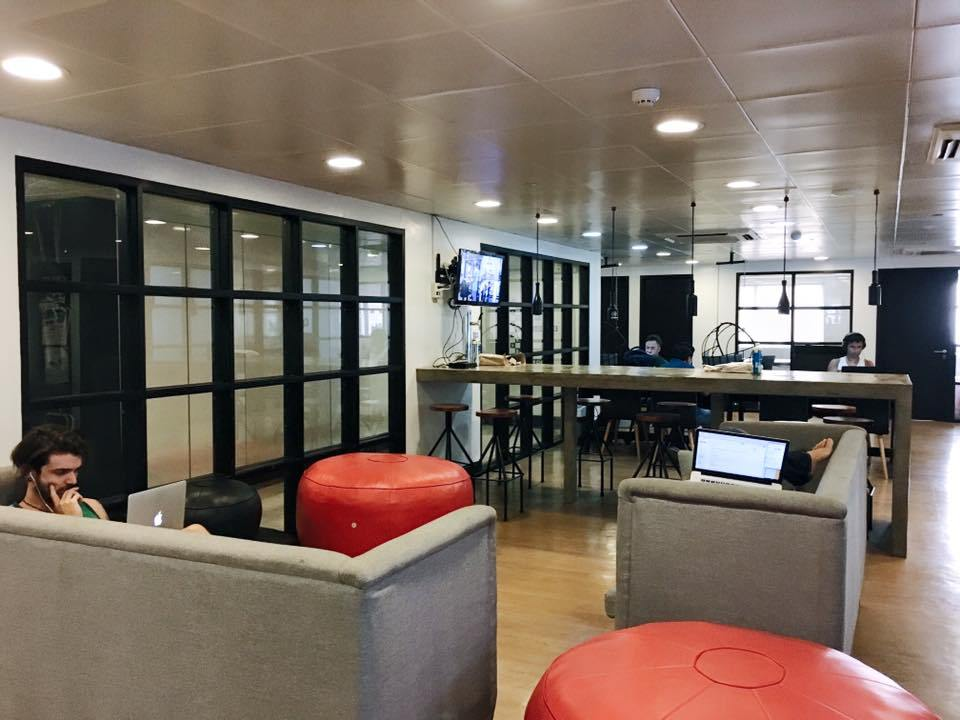
Coworking space in Makati, the Philippines

In Hong Kong, numerous coworking spaces have been established to support the startup sector. Forbes has categorized the city as a significant tech location, alongside New York City and Silicon Valley. These spaces are distributed across various districts, with a high concentration on Hong Kong Island, particularly in Central and Sheung Wan.

The Malaysian state of Penang, long regarded as the Silicon Valley of the East, has also witnessed an increase in coworking spaces. Aside from privately owned startups, the Penang state government has embarked on a drive to convert colonial-era buildings in the capital city of George Town into coworking spaces.

As well as tech startups, coworking is becoming increasingly common amongst digital nomads in Asia. A 2011 survey found most coworkers are currently in their late twenties to late thirties, with an average age of 34 years. Two-thirds are men, one third are women. Four in five coworkers started their career with a university education. The majority of coworkers work in creative industries or new media. Slightly more than half of all coworkers are freelancers.

Coworking is popular in India. According to a 2017 report by real estate firm CBRE, there are 350 shared office operators present in India spread across more than 800 locations. Leasing activity by coworking and business center operators more than tripled on 2016.

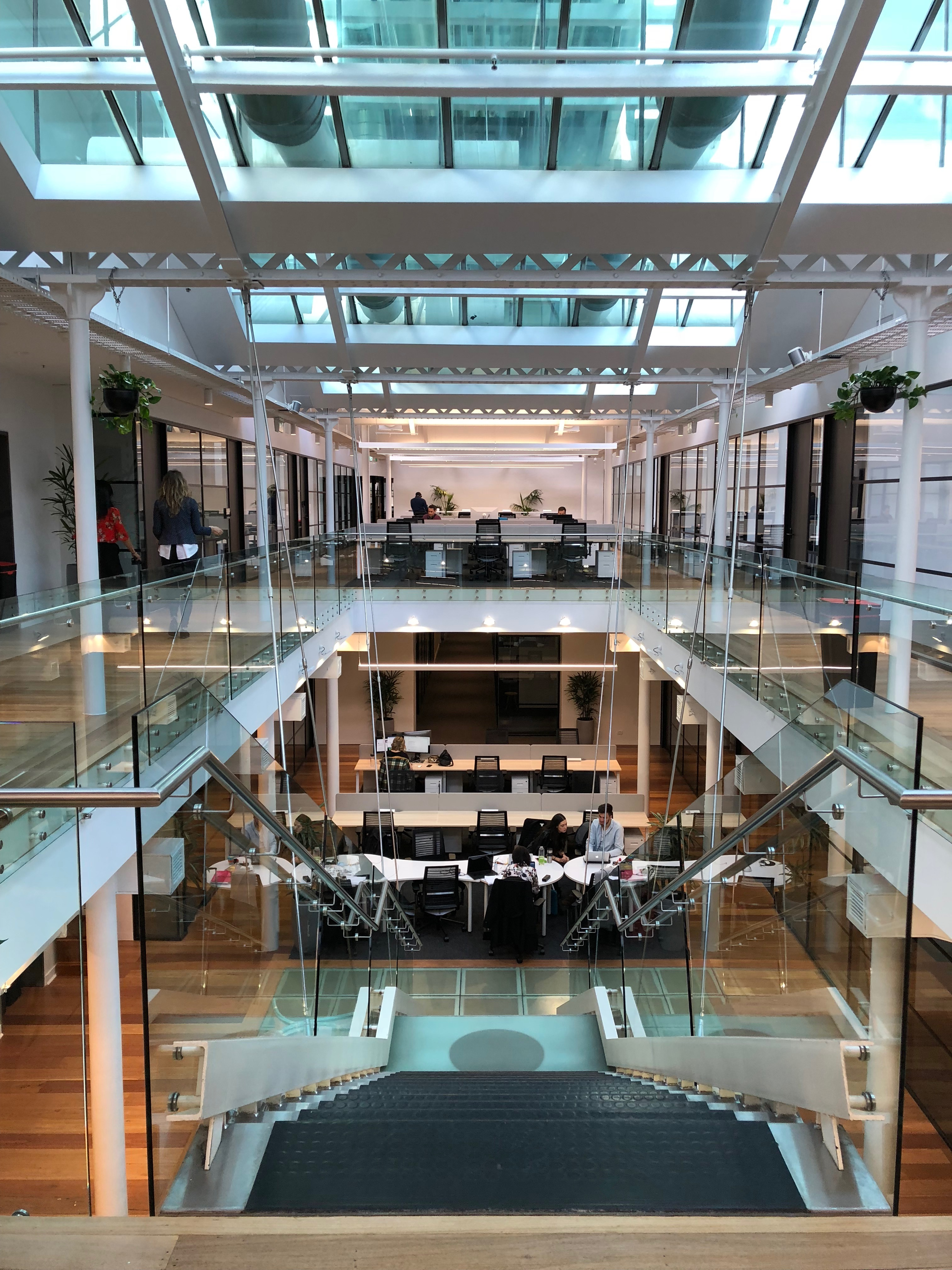
Coworking space in Melbourne, Australia

In Australia, WeWork and Spaces are present, challenging locally owned and operated companies. Hub Australia is the largest, privately owned Australian coworking operator. With many independent operators opening smaller specialist sites (including in rural and regional areas of the large country), some larger providers have expanded nationwide, with the distance between major cities an asset to both the coworking provider and the community.

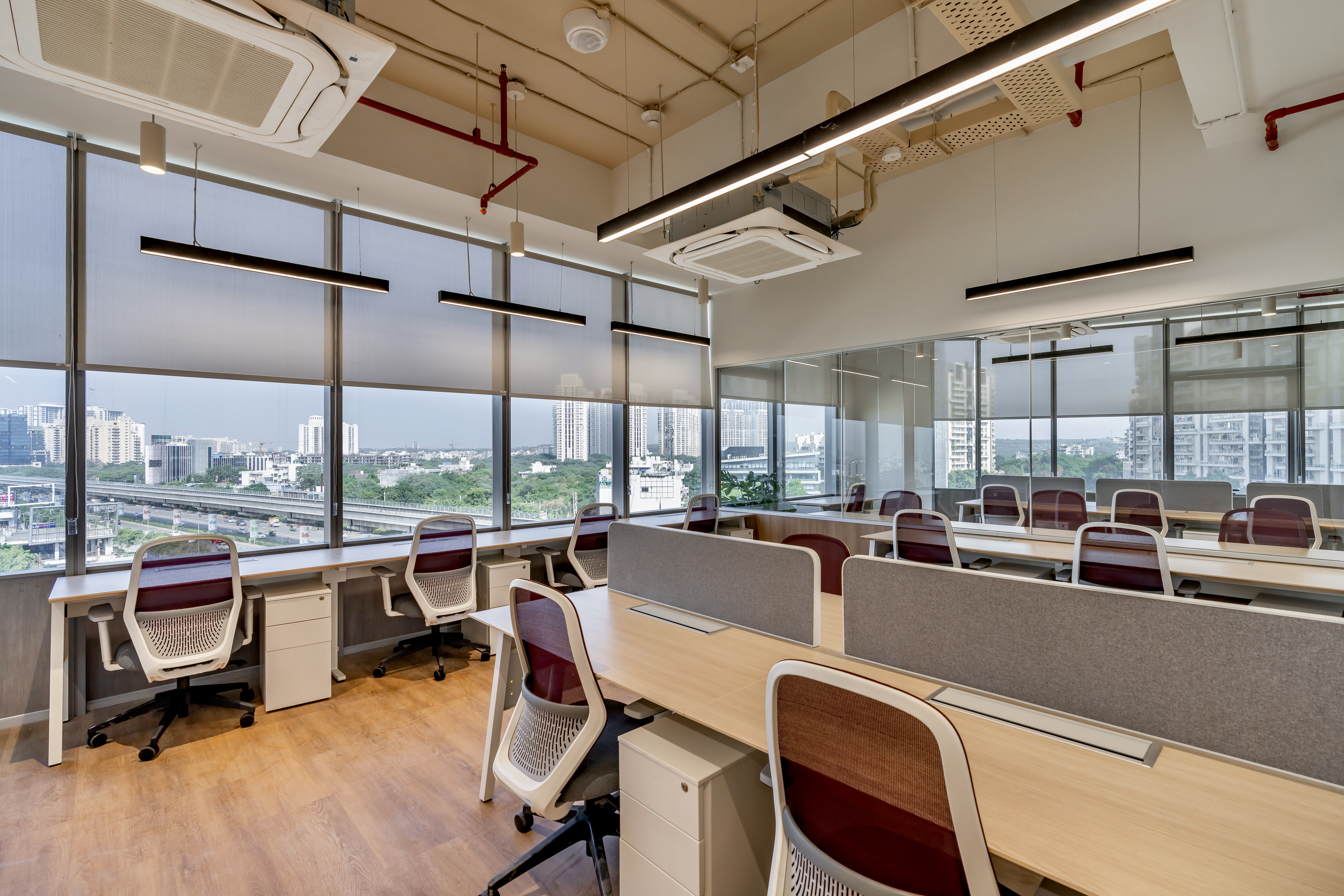
Coworking Space in Gurgaon

In India, Coworking business is very popular in metro city as Tier 2 and Tier 3 Cities of India. In India during 2017 and 2018 indicates a marked increase. While in 2017, the space leased was 1.9 million sq. ft., it increased more than two times to 3.9 million sq. ft. in 2018. India has the third-largest startup ecosystem after China and the US with more than 5,200 startups. Now many major cities like Mumbai, Hyderabad, Bangalore, Gurgaon, Delhi, Noida, Ahmedabad and Chennai have coworking spaces and they are increasing by the day due to the startups.

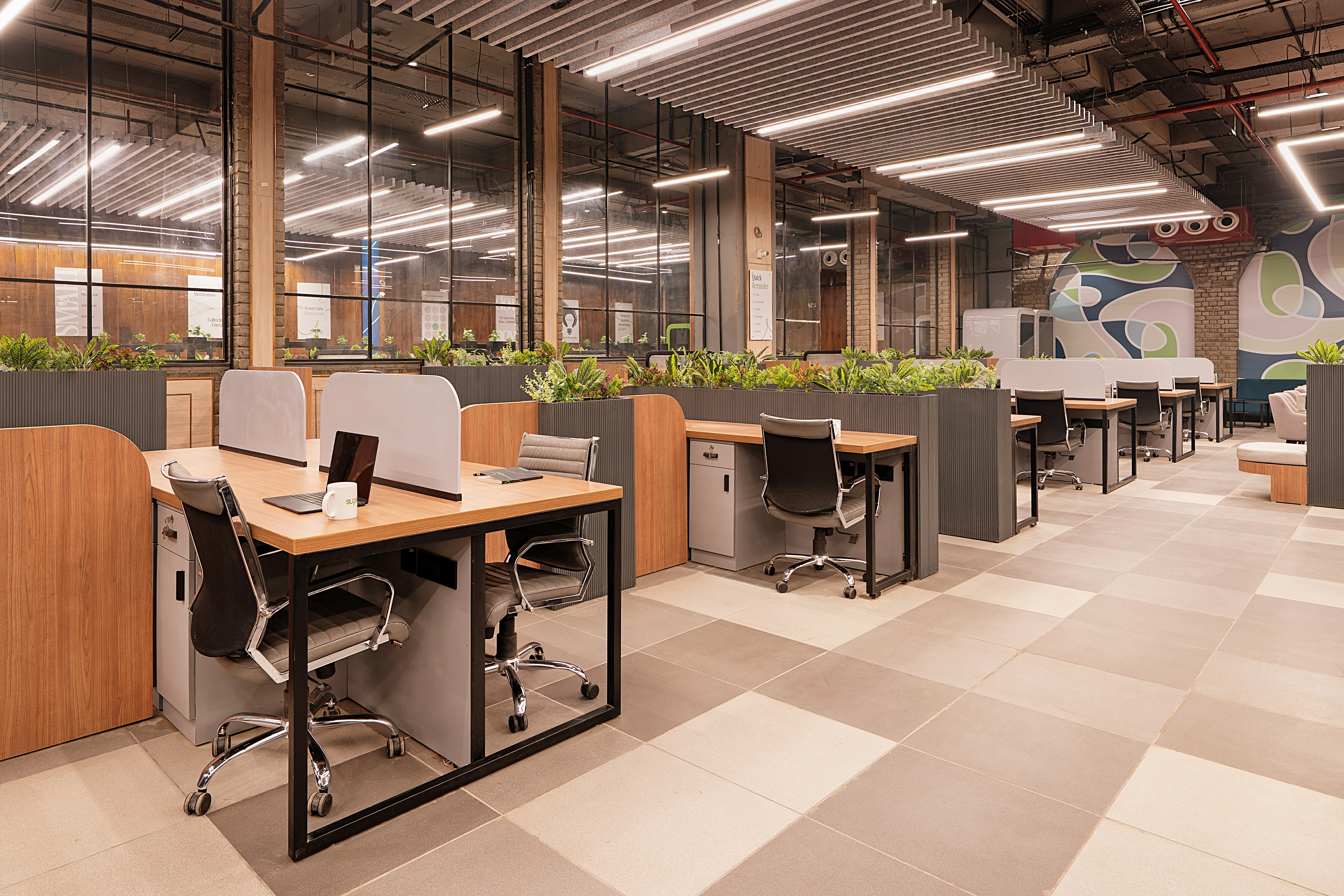
Coworking space in Noida

=== In Europe ===
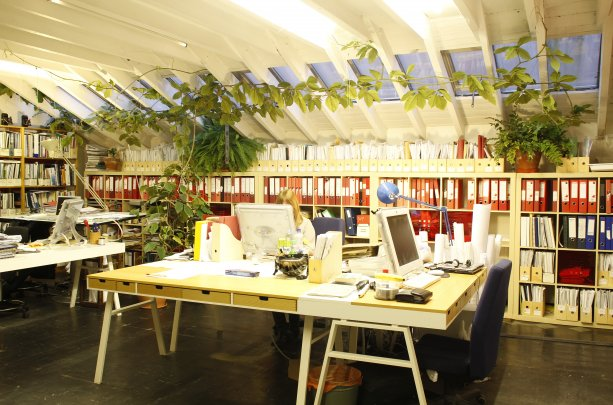
Coworking space in Glasgow, UK

In 2017, Europe ranked third as a region in terms of the number of coworking spaces, behind the United States (3,205) and Asia (3,975).

France opened its first coworking space in 2008, La Cantine, located in Paris.

The U.K. with a special focus on London, has a number of collaborative working initiatives. In the city, the Shoreditch area has large numbers of coworking spaces on the market, which is able to meet the needs of start-ups, entrepreneurs, and freelancers. Camden Collective is a regeneration project in London that re-purposes previously vacant and underused properties that opened its first 'wire-less, wall-less' coworking space in 2009.

In June 2013, the Government of the United Kingdom announced it would be applying coworking principles to a new pilot scheme for its 'One Public Sector Estate' strategy covering 12 local authorities in England, which will encourage councils to work with central government departments and other bodies so that staff share buildings. This will enable the authorities to encourage collaboration as well as re-use or release property and land deemed surplus to requirements, cutting spending and freeing up land for local development.

Estonia At the beginning of 2022, the Pärnu Start-Up Center coworking space opened in Pärnu. Their aim is to connect remote workers and small entrepreneurs who usually work in a café or at home, offering them a comfortable business centre where they can work in peace and meet their clients. Helping local business community to grow and make new contacts. Believing in the power of community and collaboration, and knowledge that together they can make the impossible possible. The building Hommiku 5 was renovated and funded for digital professionals by Chi Keung Ivan Wong from Hong Kong.

Coworking is also common in continental Europe, in places such as Stockholm and Brussels.

Smaller urban areas with many young and creative people and especially College towns may offer coworking places. Cooperation between coworking spaces and academic environments are focused.

=== In North America ===
Since Brad Neuberg started the coworking movement in 2005, San Francisco continues to have a large presence in the coworking community and is home to a growing number of coworking spaces. Also in the Bay Area, Anca Mosoiu established Tech Liminal in 2009, a coworking place in Oakland.

The coworking model for office space is extremely popular in Miami. In fact, a 2018 study done by Yardi Matrix, recognized Miami as the US city with most co-working spaces per square foot. As of 2023, Florida is one of the fastest growing coworking markets.

In the United states, coworking has also spread into many other metropolitan areas, with cities such as Seattle, Washington, Portland, Oregon, and Wichita, Kansas, now offering several coworking venues. In recent years there has been an increase in the number of suburban and rural coworking spaces including Amarillo, Texas, Des Moines, Iowa, Independence, Oregon and Indianapolis, Indiana.

The New York coworking community has also been evolving rapidly in Regus and Rockefeller Group Business Center. WeWork and other services have a large presence. The demand for coworking in Brooklyn neighborhoods is high due to the increased number of millennials in the workforce; nearly one in 10 workers in the Gowanus, Brooklyn area are remote workers. The industrial area of Gowanus is seeing a surge in new startups that are redesigning old buildings into new coworking spaces. In Brooklyn, in 2008, the first green-focused coworking space in the US, called Green Spaces, was founded by Jennie Nevin, and it expanded in 2009 to Manhattan and Denver and has been a driving force for green entrepreneurship through the collaboration of coworking.

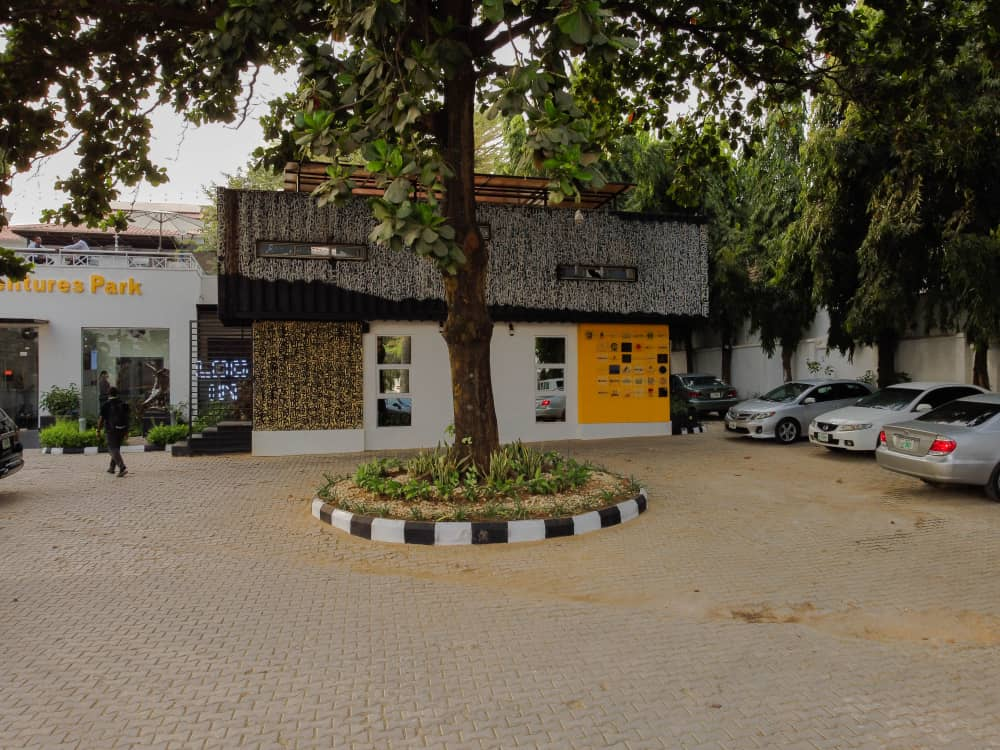
Hubs in Africa

In Canada, coworking has become popular in many large cities, including Toronto, Ontario, Vancouver, British Columbia, and Montreal, Quebec.

=== In Africa ===
In 2011, Co-Creation Hub was founded in Yaba, Lagos by Bosun Tijani and Femi Longe, it is often referred to as Cc-Hub and it houses over 50 startups such as BudgIT, GoMyWay, Lifebank, Findworka, Autobox

IHub is also an innovation hub and incubator space for startups founded by Erik Hersman in 2010. iHub was a pioneering coworking space in Africa, in 2019 Cc-hub announces the acquisition of IHub in Nairobi, Kenya.

Ventures Park was founded in 2016 in Abuja by Kola Aina. Its an artsy space for freelancer, entrepreneurs, professionals, and startups manage their operations and network. They launched a Campus Co-working space in University of Abuja known as Ventures Platform campus

In 2023, WomHub coworking space opened in Cape Town. It is a female-founded innovation center and coworking space designed to support women entrepreneurs in South Africa.

== Occupancy demographic in coworking spaces ==
=== Age of occupants ===
The average age of members in coworking spaces is currently 36 years old, increasing slightly from the previous year. Freelancers and entrepreneurs with staff are the oldest members with an average age of 38 and 40 years, respectively. Meanwhile, employees under the age of 30 make up 43% of the total workforce, with an average age of 33 years.In larger cities, where the ratio of employees is higher, the average age of members is lower at 34.5 years, while smaller cities with populations of less than 100,000 have an average member age of 38.5 years.

=== Gender of occupants ===
Women represent an estimated 40% of workers in coworking spaces, a figure that is thought to be increasing. This rise is largely attributed to the growing number of employees working in coworking spaces; in these spaces, women represent a small majority of employees, 46% of freelancers, and 24% of employer positions. Similar to trends outside of coworking spaces, the share of female members drops, particularly in the age group of 30 to 50 years, after marriage due to child care. This could also be influenced by the longer travel times women often face, especially as employees, when travelling to coworking spaces.

=== Area of work in occupants ===
Smaller coworking spaces largely house freelancers, and as the spaces grow bigger, they provide offices for companies or private individuals, which causes a decline in the ratio of freelancers. However, the trend has stagnated lately, and freelancers still make up 41% of coworking space members. The dominating industries for coworkers are IT, PR & sales. The survey also found that members are highly educated, with around 85% having finished an academic education, and the age group of over 50-year-olds has a slightly lower percentage of university graduates. Additionally, freelancers are more likely to hold a university degree, while employers are more likely to have a doctorate.

== See also ==
- Coworker (company)
- Coworking space providers
- Hot desking
- Office sharing
- Outsourcing
- Collaboration
- SOHO China
