= Ory Okolloh =

Kenyan activist, lawyer, and blogger

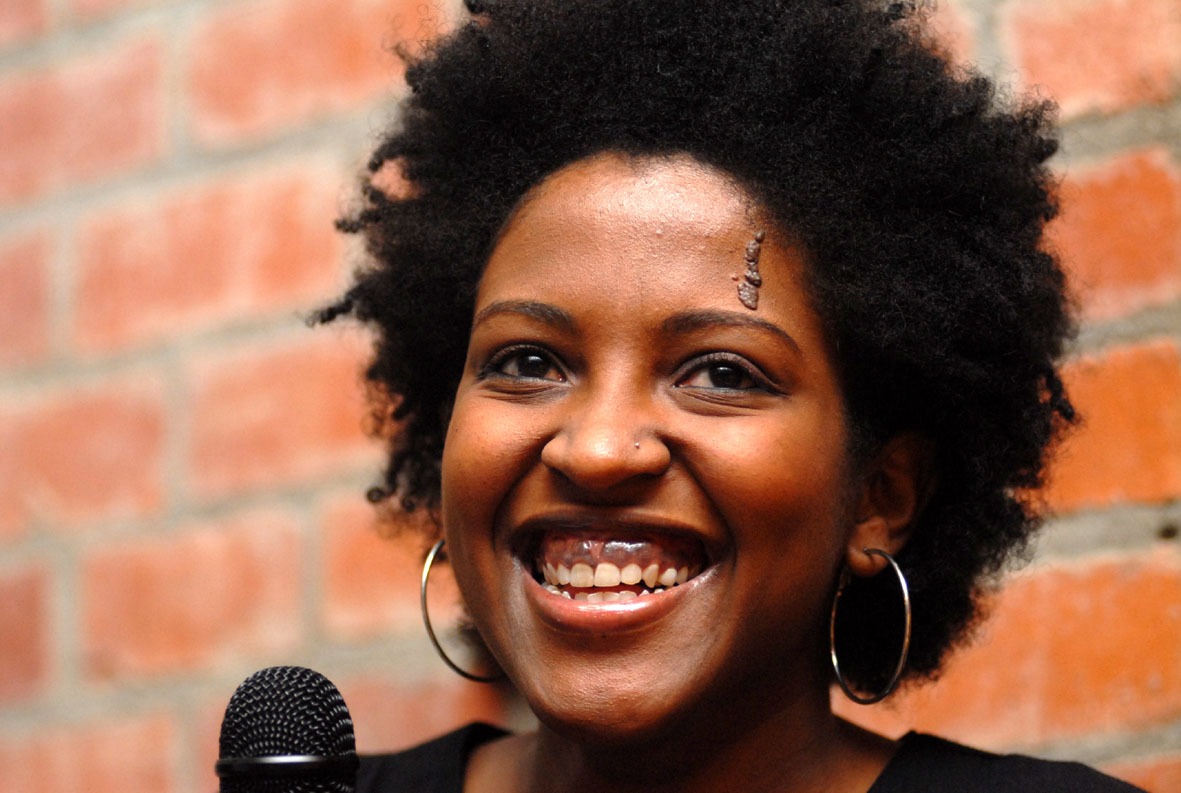
- Okolloh in 2006
- Citizenship: Kenya
- Education: University of Pittsburgh Harvard Law School
- Occupations: Activist, Lawyer, and Blogger
- Organization(s): Covington and Burling Thomson Reuters Founders Share Company Safaricom GSMA Foundation

Ory Okolloh (or Ory Okolloh Mwangi) is a Kenyan activist, lawyer, and blogger. She is a partner at Verod-Kepple Africa Ventures, a pan-African investment firm based in Lagos, Nigeria, with offices in Nairobi.

She previously served as the managing director at Omidyar Network, and as the policy manager for Africa with Google. Ory was named 100 most influential People in 2014. .

== Education ==
Okolloh earned a Bachelor of Arts in Political Science, summa cum laude, from the University of Pittsburgh. She graduated from Harvard Law School in 2005 with a Juris Doctor. After graduation, she turned down a job offer from a D.C. law firm to return to Kenya to work on government accountability.

== Career ==
In 2006, Okolloh co-founded the parliamentary watchdog site Mzalendo (Swahili: "Patriot"). The site sought to increase government accountability by systematically recording bills, speeches, MPs, and standing orders.

When Kenya was engulfed in violence following a disputed presidential election in 2007, Okolloh co-created Ushahidi (Swahili: "Witness"), a website and tool that collected and recorded eyewitness reports of violence using text messages and Google Maps. The technology has since been adapted for expanded purposes (including monitoring elections and tracking pharmaceutical availability) and used in a number of other countries.

Okolloh has a personal blog, Kenyan Pundit, which was featured on Global Voices Online.

She has worked as a legal consultant for NGOs and has worked at Covington and Burling, the Kenya National Commission on Human Rights, and the World Bank.

Okolloh was appointed to the board of Thomson Reuters Founders Share Company, the body that acts as a guardian of the Thomson Reuters Trust Principles in May 2015. She retired from the company in December 2024, having served as the deputy chair in her last year.

Okolloh has also served as an independent director at Safaricom since February 2023. She departed from the position in July 2024. She previously served on the board of Stanbic Bank Foundation Kenya, from April 2020 to July 2024, and as a non-executive director of Stanbic Bank until December 2020, when she resigned.

In February 2025, she was appointed to the board of GSMA Foundation.

She was appointed to the Board of Kepple Group in Japan in May 2025, as an Outside Director.

Ory is a member of the Africa Advisory Board of Harvard University's Centre For African Studies.

Additionally, she is involved in the following organisations' boards:

Organisation	Role	Appointment date	References
Van Leer Group	Board trustee	July 2020	
East African Breweries Ltd	Non-executive director	October 2020	
Deloitte Africa	Non-executive director	June 2021	
Adecco Group Foundation	Board member	July 2021	
GSMA Foundation	Board member	February 2025	
Kepple Group Japan	Outside Director	May 2025	

== Awards ==
- 2012, Forbes list "Africa's Most Successful Women"
- 2013, "Africa's Most Powerful Women In Technology"
- 2014, Time list "The 100 Most Influential People"
