= Ushahidi =

Non-profit technology company

Ushahidi, Inc.
- Founded: 2008
- Founder: Erik Hersman, Ory Okolloh, Juliana Rotich, David Kobia
- Type: 501(c)(3)
- Tax ID no.: 2652079
- Purpose: activism, mapping
- Location: Nairobi, Kenya
- Origins: Crowdsourcing
- Region served: World
- Method: mapping and geospatial
- Owner: Ushahidi, Inc.
- Key people: Erik Hersman, Juliana Rotich, David Kobia
- Revenue: US$2,500,000–$4,000,000
- Endowment: US$1,800,000
- Employees: 31
- Volunteers: 50
- Website: www.ushahidi.com

Ushahidi is an open source software application that collates and maps data using user-generated reports. It uses the concept of crowdsourcing serving as an initial model for what has been coined as "activist mapping" – the combination of social activism, citizen journalism and geographic information. Ushahidi allows local observers to submit reports using their mobile phones or the Internet, creating an archive of events with geographic and time-date information.

The Ushahidi platform is often used for crisis response, human rights reporting, and election monitoring. Ushahidi (Swahili for "testimony", closely related to shahidi which means "witness") was created in the aftermath of Kenya's disputed 2007 presidential election that collected eyewitness reports of violence reported by email and text message and placed them on a Google Maps interface.

The Ushahidi platform has been used by the United Nations Department of Field Services and Peacekeeping, in response to the Haiti Earthquake in 2010, to monitor the Nigerian elections in 2011, by the Obama Campaign for America 2012, by the Nepalese army to respond to the earthquake of 2015, in and by local activists groups such as Humanitarian Tracker to monitor violence in the Syrian civil war and HarassMap to help women report on sexual harassment.

Deployment of crisis mapping applications like Ushahidi benefits from attention to how the technology fits into the relevant cultural settings, and focusing on realistic goals.

== Products ==
=== Ushahidi ===
Ushahidi v2 was built on the Kohana web framework, a fork of the CodeIgniter framework. It includes support for Nexmo wholesale SMS API and Clickatell SMS Gateway (Budgetsms.net SMS Gateway is planned). Furthermore, the official Ushahidi-hosted websites use the commercial service. Ushahidi provides the option of using OpenStreetMap maps in its user interface, but requires the Google Maps API for geocoding. Ushahidi is often set up using a local SMS gateway created by a local FrontlineSMS set-up.

Ushahidi v3 was released in September 2015. As an improvement to the v2 platform it is built as an API with a web client. It allows for custom survey creation, and the running of multiple surveys on a single deployment, amongst other feature improvements from v2 such as embeddable maps and surveys, analytics, private deployments, and management of roles and permissions. It is built on the Laravel PHP web framework. It is open source under the AGPL license.

Ushahidi v4 was released in 2018, and replaces Kohana with Lumen.

==== Releases and codenames ====
- 1.0 Mogadishu – 10 December 2009
- 1.2 Haiti – ~22 January 2010
- 2.0 Luanda – 22 November 2010
- 2.1 Tunis – 9 August 2011
- 2.2 Juba – 13 March 2012
- 2.3 Juba – 24 April 2012
- 3.0 - September 2015
- 4.0 - 1 Oct 2018

=== Crowdmap ===
Crowdmap was designed and built by the team behind Ushahidi. As the platform evolved, so did its users. Crowdmap allows users to set up their own deployments of Ushahidi without having to install it on a web server. Since its release in 2010, prominent deployments of Crowdmap have documented the global Occupy movement and the 2011 London anti-cuts protest. The original Crowdmap was a hosted version of the Ushahidi v2 open source software platform.

On 31 December 2010, the Ushahidi team announced a new version of Crowdmap, that differed from the Ushahidi v2 codebase: Checkins, a geosocial add-on to Crowdmap that allows users to create a white-label alternative to sites like Foursquare and Gowalla. Rather than filling out submission forms online, checkins allow Crowdmap users to expedite data entry to their deployment, focusing first on location and adding more detailed information later. Ushahidi describes the effort as "checkins with a purpose".

=== SwiftRiver (discontinued) ===
SwiftRiver was free software whose goal was "to democratize access to the tools for making sense of information", particularly Twitter tweets. It was born out of the need to understand and act upon a wave of massive amounts of crisis data that tends to overwhelm responders in the first 24 hours of a disaster. The project attracted a lot of interest from newsrooms. In December 2014, Ushahidi stopped development and support, leaving the source code available on github. A user of the software was FirstToSee, a crisis management group in Pierce County, Washington, who noted that "One of the challenges of the project is the extensive technology stack used... deployment requires at the very least a “jack of all trades” who understand the basics of all these technologies." No new users are currently known.

=== Rollcall ===
Ushahidi built RollCall after a team member was involved in the terrorist attack at Westgate Malle in Nairobi in 2013. Rollcall is a quick way to check in with the people someone is responsible for during critical situations. Rollcall sends a one-click message with a binary question such as "Are you okay?" to a pre-prepared contact list, such as list of colleagues, parents at a school, or an embassy's list of citizens in a country at that time, via text, email, mobile app, and Slack. The recipients respond with a "yes" or "no" allowing the organization responsible for them to quickly triage who is in danger.

== History ==
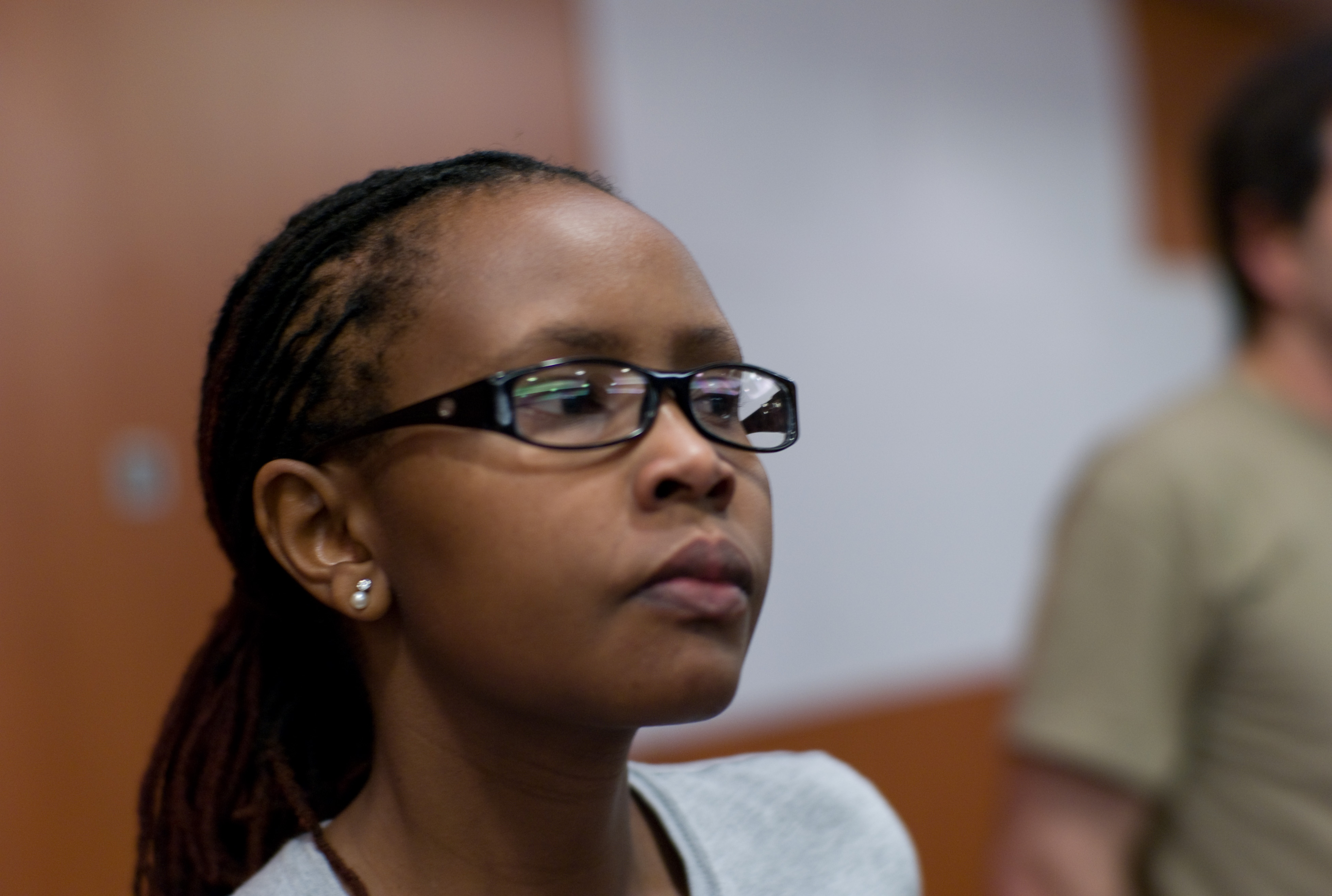
Juliana Rotich

=== Beginnings in Kenya ===
Ushahidi (Swahili for "testimony" or "witness") is a website created in the aftermath of Kenya's disputed 2007 presidential election (see 2007–2008 Kenyan crisis) that collected eyewitness reports of violence sent in by email and text-message and placed them on a Google map. It is also the name of the open source software developed for that site, which has since been improved, released freely, and used for a number of similar projects around the globe.

The Kenyan site was developed and run by several bloggers and software developers, all current or former residents of Kenya. They include Erik Hersman, Juliana Rotich, Ory Okolloh, and David Kobia. The site was initially proposed by Okolloh, developed cheaply, and put online within a few days. International media, government sources, NGOs, and Kenyan journalists and bloggers were used to verify eyewitness testimony. The site was later also used to facilitate donations from abroad.

An analysis by Harvard Kennedy School at Harvard University found that Ushahidi was better overall at reporting acts of violence as they began. The data collected by Ushahidi was superior to that reported by the mainstream media in Kenya at the time. The service was also better at reporting non-fatal violence as well as information coming in from rural areas.

On 23 December 2010, Ushahidi Co-founder and Executive Director Ory Okolloh announced that she was stepping down from her role to become Manager of Policy for Africa at Google.

=== Post-Kenya crisis uses ===
Soon after its initial use in Kenya, the Ushahidi software was used to create a similar site to track anti-immigrant violence in South Africa, in May 2008. The software has since been used to map violence in eastern Congo, beginning in November 2008. Ushahidi is used in Kenya, Malawi, Uganda, and Zambia in June 2009 to track pharmacy stockouts in several Southeast African countries. Finally, it was used to monitor elections in Mexico and India, among other projects. It was also used by Al Jazeera to collect eyewitness reports during the 2008–09 Gaza War.

The post election violence in Kenya was the subject of a Harvard Humanitarian Institute study and mentioned in a Berkman Center report.

=== 2010 ===
==== Haiti ====
In 2010, due to the earthquake in Haiti, Patrick Meier launched a joint effort between Ushahidi, The Fletcher School of Law & Diplomacy at Tufts University, UN OCHA/Colombia and the International Network of Crisis Mappers (CM*Net) to start the Haiti implementation. A few hours later many humanitarian/tech workers joined this initiative. Nearly 40,000 independent reports were sent to the Ushahidi Haiti Project of which nearly 4,000 distinct events were plotted. The project instance was an impressive proof of concept for the application of crisis mapping and crowdsourcing to large scale catastrophes and a novel approach to the rapidly evolving field of crisis informatics.

==== Chile ====
Only a month after the Haiti earthquake, the 2010 earthquake in Chile prompted Patrick Meier to launch Ushahidi-Chile within hours of the initial quake. The Chile site is co-managed with the School of International and Public Affairs, Columbia University in the United States, supported by Chilean Americans.

==== Louisiana, U.S. ====
On 20 April 2010 BP's offshore Deepwater Horizon oil rig exploded killing eleven workers and precipitating the largest accidental offshore oil spill in the history of the petroleum industry. On 3 May the Louisiana Bucket Brigade (LABB) publicly released the Oil Spill Crisis Map, the first application of the Ushahidi platform in a humanitarian response in the United States.

In the years since the BP oil spill, LABB continues to use the map (now the iWitness Pollution Map) as a repository of eyewitness reports and photos documenting the impacts of petrochemical pollution on human health and the environment. Reports to the map come from cities all over Louisiana, including Baton Rouge, St. Rose, and Chalmette. Since 2010 LABB has collected over 14,000 reports, making it the largest and longest-running deployment of an Ushahidi instance.

==== Washington, D.C. ====
In the wake of winter storms, The Washington Post and the web development company PICnet used the software to create a site mapping blocked roads and other information.

==== Italy ====
Elena Rapisardi, together with Giovanni Lotto, launched the first Italian crowdmap Open Foreste Italiane in order to list and map information to prevent and manage forest fires; the meaning of this project has been reported on the Ushahidi blog.

Though OpenForeste did not completely achieve his goals, it showed importance for two reasons: (1) unlike previous instances, the platform was utilized in absence of an acting crisis or emergency to collect, map, share and spread information in order to manage future and potential emergencies, thus joining the awareness of the possibilities of Web 2.0 and a different approach to natural risk prevention; (2) it brought to Italy the knowledge and potential of Ushahidi, crowdmapping and social use of crowdsourcing, which was then used in following years in several instances, both private and public, especially from local Civil Protection structures and based on the new approach to the Ushahidi platform (see here a non-complete crowdmap of Italian Crowdsourcing Projects).

==== Russia ====
Ushahidi was used in Russia to set up a "map of help" for voluntary workers needed after the 2010 Russian wildfires.

=== 2011 ===
Christchurch

Using Ushahidi, the Christchurch Recovery Map website was launched less than 24 hours after the February 2011 Christchurch earthquake in Christchurch, New Zealand. The site maps locations of services such as food, water, toilets, fuel, ATMs, and medical care. Information was gathered via Twitter using the #eqnz hashtag, SMS messages, and email. The site was founded by a group of web professionals, and maintained by volunteers.

Middle East

This software allowed pro-democracy demonstrators across the Middle East to organise and communicate what was happening around them in early 2011. On 2 March, the UN Office for the Coordination of Humanitarian Affairs (OCHA) requested that the Standby Volunteer Task Force be activated for Libya. The Task Force's Tech Team set up a password protected Ushahidi platform almost immediately and several days later launched a public version at OCHA's request. This allowed users to contribute relevant information about ground conditions as they occurred.

Italy

In July 2011, Giuseppe Calamita had created the first crowdmap to monitor a WIMAX/LTE Internet Service Provider to answer the issues not due to the ISP (jammer, etc.)

India

India Citizen Reports has been using Ushahidi since 2011 to collect and disseminate reports in various categories like civic problems, crimes and corruption. TelecomMap.com uses Ushahidi to map 3G network quality and Wi-Fi hotspots.

Australia

Australian Broadcasting Corporation used Ushahidi to map the Queensland floods in January.

United States

The MightyMoRiver Project used Ushahidi's hosted service Crowdmap to track the Missouri River floods of 2011.

Macedonia

Transparency Watch Project is using the Ushahidi platform to track corruption reported cases in the Republic of Macedonia. PrijaviKorupcija is a joint project by Transparency International and the Center for International Relations allowing citizens to report cases of corruption via ONE by sending SMS from their mobile phones, sending an email, using the web form, the hashtag #korupcijaMK on Twitter or by reporting via phone call.

Nigerian Elections

Ushahidi was used to monitor the Nigerian 2011 elections under the project Reclaim Naija. A published article in the Journal of Information Technology & Politics by Catie Snow Bailard & Steven Livingston showed that, "Controlling for a number of factors, we find that the number and nature of crowdmap reports generated by citizens is significantly correlated with increased voter turnout (by 8%) in the 2011 Nigerian presidential election as a result of providing officials with improved information about the functionality of local polling stations."

=== 2012 ===
Balkans (Bosnia and Herzegovina, Serbia, Montenegro, Macedonia)

Al Jazeera Balkans deployed Ushahidi crisis mapping platform on 5 February 2012 to track the snow/cold emergency in the Balkans.

=== 2013 ===
Kenya Elections

Ushahidi helped run the Uchaguzi partnership to monitor the 2013 Kenyan elections. The deployment gathered over 8000 reports, a report "Uchaguzi: A Qualitative and Quantitive Analysis of ICTS, Statebuilding, and Peacebuilding in Kenya." showed that 75% of reporters said their report was responded to.

=== 2014 ===
Kenya

Ushahidi announced Ping (now called Rollcall) in response to the attacks on Westgate Mall in Nairobi. The software was used to map out all the blood drive center locations in Nairobi and let users quickly identify places to donate, see which blood types were in demand, and identify whether equipment or volunteers were needed at any locations. Among the goals of this map was to help ensure that when the Kenyan population came out to donate blood, they would know which donation centers needed their blood type the most.

=== 2015 ===
Crowd sourced data were extensively used during the relief and rescue operations at Quakemap.org. Kathmandu Living Labs (KLL), a volunteer organization, set up a platform to collect and manage data from crowd using Ushahidi. KLL further managed to conduct first level of verification as well, providing the Nepalese Army with the following details: location, number of affected people, number of death/injured, support requirements, level of urgency, and contact information.

The Nepalese army report said that "Crowd Sourcing is one of the common approaches to collect information from the public. Although it is not new in the context of disaster management, but during April Earthquake in Nepal, this approach was appropriately used in a matured way. The systematic process defined by Kathmandu Living Labs volunteers marked a path in utilization of crowd sourced data by implementing agency like Nepalese Army."

=== 2016 ===
Ushahidi created USAelectionmonitor.com to monitor the USA 2016 Presidential Election. After the election Ushahidi set up Documenthate.org to monitor the spike in hate crimes against minorities in the USA post election. Ushahidi partnered with journalist and activist Shaun King and non-profit journalism group Propublica. The New Yorker covered the story, saying: "Now Shaun King, a writer for the Daily News, is working with the open-source software company Ushahidi to create a map of post-election intimidation. 'Thousands of people have emailed me incident reports over the past seven days,' King wrote me in an e-mail. 'The team at Ushahidi is helping me go through them, verify them the best we can, catalogue and then map them, then share them.' The aim is to raise awareness of politically motivated violence and help people stay safe, report it to authorities as needed, and create a database of such incidents."

=== 2017 ===
Ushahidi ran the Uchaguzi partnership to monitor the 2017 Kenyan elections, the fourth country-wide election monitoring effort for the organization. Ushahidi integrated a Facebook Messenger bot to allow the 7 million Facebook users in Kenya to report via Messenger. The platform received over 7000 reports on election day.

As of 2017, the platform reported that it had been deployed over 125,000 times in over 160 countries, although most of these were for evaluation, training or curiosity.

== Awards ==
Ushahidi has received several awards in recognition to its effectiveness and creativity, latest being The MacArthur Award. The awards received by Ushahidi so far include the following:

- The MacArthur Award – 2013
- Global Adaptation Index Prize – 2012
- Funding of US$1.4 million from the Omidyar Network

== Criticism ==
=== Sexual harassment allegations ===
On 9 July 2017, allegations surfaced online of Ushahidi covering up a sexual harassment incident perpetrated by one of the members of their senior leadership. Ushahidi released a statement the next day confirming they were aware of the allegations which were the subject of an ongoing internal inquiry.

Former Ushahidi board member and co-founder Ory Okolloh strongly condemned the laxity with which the board dealt with the issue on 11 July saying that "more clarity on steps that have been taken so far and the relevant timelines should be shared and those found culpable either by their action or inaction should resign".

Ushahidi released a second statement on 17 July 2017 detailing the chronology of events, showing that the incident occurred on 19 January 2017 and was reported to the board on 4 May 2017, and that on 5 May the accused was placed on temporary leave, given due process, and an investigation was undertaken. After back and forth with both parties' lawyers, the board held an inquiry on 3 July and the accused was alerted of his firing 14 days later on 17 July, the date of the statement.

Angela Kabari came out publicly on 20 July as the victim in a Medium post detailing a 6-month ordeal and called for the resignation of the entire Ushahidi board that consisted of David Kobia, Erik Hersman, Juliana Rotich and Jenny Stefanotti at the time. She identified Daudi Were, Ushahidi's Executive Director, as the accused. Her statement to the board when she reported the matter included an un-notarized transcript of the recording of the incident and claimed an earlier occurrence the previous year. In her post, she said she encountered 11 other victims some of whom were current employees of the organisation and that the board members were aware of Daudi's misconduct in separate incidents spanning 10 years, however, no others came forward. She castigated the board for lack of support, victim shaming, slander, delays and character attacks. Angela resigned on 28 June, citing frustration due to "continual stalling and inaction from the board 55 days after my complaint."

Daudi Were was alerted of his dismissal on 17 July, formally dismissed on 22 July, and Ushahidi released an apology to Angela for the harassment she experienced while working at Ushahidi.

Ushahidi staff and staff from Ushahidi related organizations, under the banner "Women in Tech Kenya", released a statement on 24 July that supported Angela's speaking out, condemned Daudi Were's conduct, applauded his dismissal, and supported the board following due process.

The Ushahidi board did not resign and through a series of posts defended their conduct, saying that they followed due process in the pursuit of justice. In a statement released on 28 July, Ushahidi said that due to the legal process, agreed upon by all parties, all communications had to go through the legal representation and called Ms. Kabari's claims that they did not care about her disingenuous for not understanding the neutral position the board undertook in the sexual harassment investigation.

== See also ==
- Crisis mapping
- Uchaguzi
- Commons-based peer production
- Cognitive Surplus
