= Erik Hersman =

Kenyan blogger

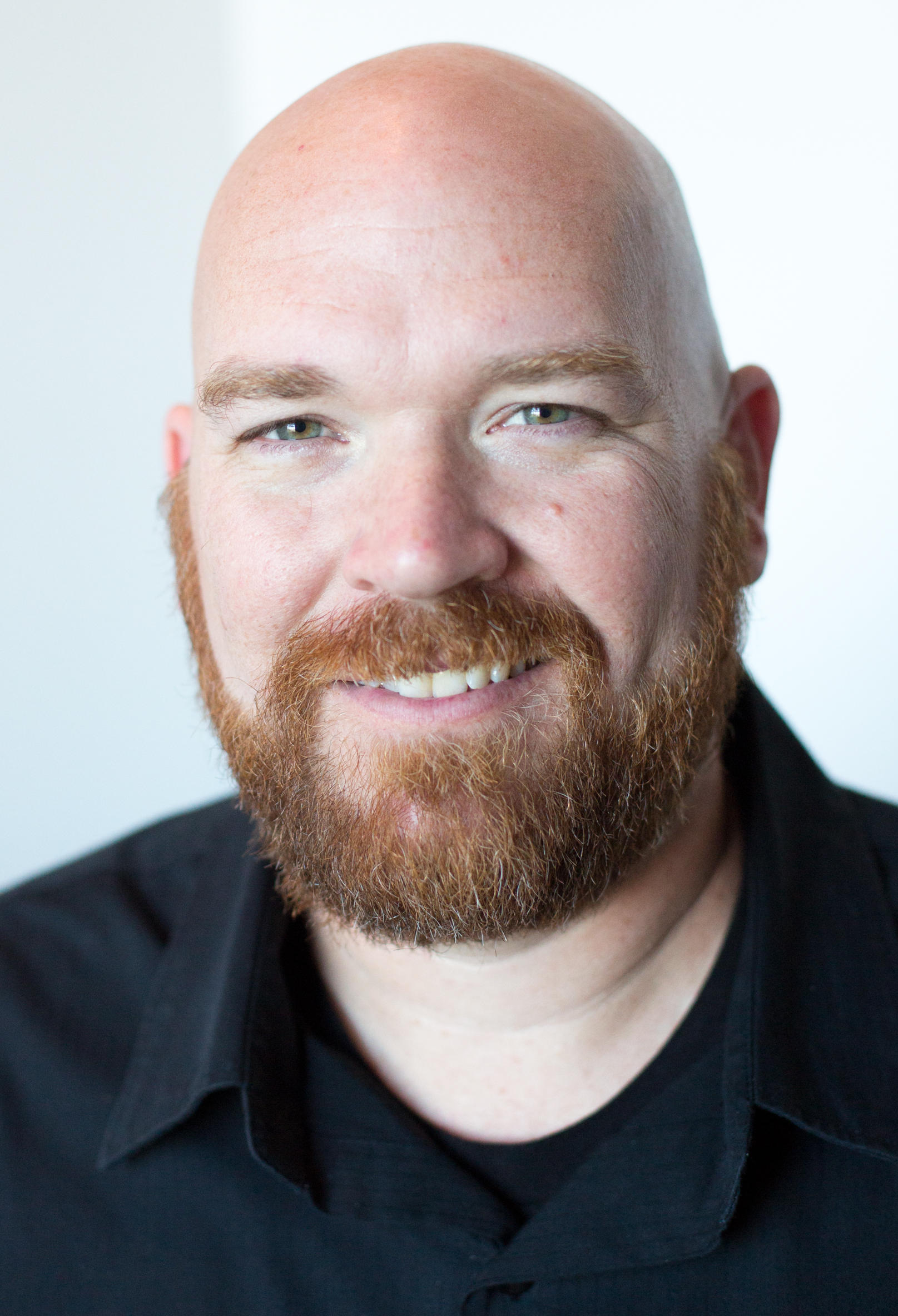
Hersman at PopTech 2013

Erik Hersman (born 1975) is a technologist, blogger and commentator who specialises in the impact and application of technology throughout Africa.

== Biography ==
Raised in Sudan and Kenya, he is a graduate of Kenya's Rift Valley Academy and Florida State University, he runs the websites WhiteAfrican and AfriGadget, the latter being a multi-author website dedicated to showcasing African ingenuity. AfriGadget was named one of Time's "Top 50 Sites of 2008".

He is co-founder of Ushahidi ("testimony" in Swahili), a crowdsourcing website created to map incidents of violence during the 2007–08 Kenyan crisis. Ushahidi has since been used for reporting violence in Madagascar and election monitoring in Afghanistan. In December 2009, the Omidyar Network announced an investment of $1.4 million to support the continued growth of the platform.

In 2008 Hersman was named a Pop!Tech Social Innovation Fellow. In the summer of 2009 he was awarded a TED Fellow Fellowship, and the following year named a Senior TED Fellow.

Married to Rinnie with three young children, he moved back to Kenya from his Florida home in December 2009.

He founded iHub, Nairobi's tech innovation hub, in March 2010 – an open space for the technologists, investors, tech companies and hackers in Nairobi.

He is the co-founder of BRCK, a 'backup generator for the internet' and one of the first hardware startups in Africa, which raised $1.2 million in July 2014.
