= Ministry of Information, Communications and the Digital Economy (Kenya) =

Government ministry of Kenya

The Ministry of Information, Communications and the Digital Economy was created in June 2004 due to a cabinet reshuffle. It is responsible for Information, Broadcasting and Communication policies.

== Departments ==
The ministry's departments are Administration, Human resources, Finance and Accounts; Economic Planning, Procurement, Aids Control Unit and Public Communications.

== Projects ==
=== Digital Literacy Program ===
The Digital Literacy Program was started to improve access to technology in schools.

=== Constituency Digital Innovation Hubs Program ===
Although the project is new, recently the concept was created in Limuru.

=== Digital Migration Project ===
The Digital Migration Project tries to switch the country from analogue TV and Medium Wave radio to digital broadcast TV and Transmission-KBC radio. The increase in digital broadcast TV has been rapid while the increase in Transmission-KBC radio has been slower, with the project only being 50% complete.
