= 50 Most Influential (Bloomberg ranking) =

Annual list of influential people

The 50 Most Influential ranking has been published by Bloomberg Media since 2011, annually featuring 50 individuals or initiatives with "the ability to move markets or shape ideas and policies".

Initially published in Bloomberg Markets until the 2016 edition. Bloomberg Businessweek took over from 2017 onwards. According to Bloomberg Media, the list is composed on the basis of recommendations and assessments by Bloomberg's journalists and analysts in the United States and internationally as well as data from Bloomberg Terminal.

The ranking has repeatedly been used as a reference or even as a news topic by news media other than Bloomberg, particularly in 2015 when political leaders were included.

== Lists ==
=== 2022 ranking ===
The 2022 ranking was published on December 14, 2022. It also includes The Usual Suspects, Notable Alums, and Ones to Watch.

- Business: Gautam Adani, Randy Nonnenberg, Chris Smalls & Michelle Eisen, Nick Hayek Jr., Kim Kardashian, Yvon Chouinard, Nicholas Bloom, Pinky Cole, Francesca Bellettini, Robin Hayes, Phil Spencer.
- Finance: Jeremy Hunt, John J. Ray III, Serena Williams, Said Haidar, Lisa Cook, Greg Solano & Wylie Aronow, Robert Habeck, Katie Haun, Daleep Singh, Kenneth C. Griffin, Todd Boehly.
- Science & Technology: Shou Zi Chew, James Webb Space Telescope, Bret Taylor, Nan Ransohoff, C. C. Wei, Tom Oxley, Rebecca Gomperts, Guillaume Pousaz, Dylan Field.
- Politics: Liz Cheney & Bennie Thompson, Ketanji Brown Jackson, Volodymyr Zelenskyy, Liane Randolph, Sauli Niinistö, Olivia Julianna, Lawrence Wong, Scarlett Lewis, Anthony Albanese, Gabriel Boric, Park Ji-hyun.
- Entertainment: Eileen Gu, Kevin Warren, Quinta Brunson, Tom Cruise, Jennifer Hudson, Brian Flores, Aaron Judge, Bad Bunny.

=== 2021 ranking ===
The 2021 ranking was published on December 1, 2021. It also includes The Usual Suspects, Notable Alums, and Ones to Watch.

- Business: James Kuffner, Melanie Perkins, Karen Lynch, Jitse Groen, Jim Farley, John Elkann, Albert Bourla, Toni Petersson, Xu Yangtian, David Zaslav.
- Finance: MacKenzie Scott, John Rolle, Nick Clarry, Carlos Eduardo Brandt, Nick Molnar and Anthony Eisen, The Meme Stock, Michael Sapir, Anne Brorhilker, Charlie Penner, Goldman Sachs' 13 Anonymous Junior Investment Bankers.
- Science & Technology: Vanessa Pappas, Andy Jassy, Peter Beck, Hoesung Lee, Frances Haugen, Andre Soelistyo, David Baszucki, Patrick Collison and John Collison, MiMi Aung, Falguni Nayar.
- Politics: Alexei Navalny, Jimmy Lai, Darnella Frazier, Elise Stefanik, Kate Jenkins, Cori Bush, Eugene Goodman, Stop AAPI Hate (Cynthia Choi, Russell Jeung, and Manjusha Kulkarni), Lina Khan, John Nkengasong.
- Entertainment: Bang Si-hyuk, Jia Ling, Allyson Felix, Jason Sudeikis, Mike Winkelmann, Olivia Rodrigo, Hwang Dong-hyuk, Paige Bueckers, Britney Spears, Matt Stone and Trey Parker.

=== 2020 ranking ===
The 2020 ranking was published on December 7, 2020, with many individuals being noted for their contributions during the COVID-19 pandemic. It included the below categories, as well as The Usual Suspects and Ones to Watch.

- Business: Sumit Singh, Aurora James, Strive Masiyiwa, Reed Hastings, Wang Xing, John Foley, Byju Raveendran, Viya, Forrest Li.
- Finance: Jane Fraser, James Gorman, Kristalina Georgieva, Alan Howard, Linda Kirkpatrick, Darrin Williams, Baiju Bhatt and Vladimir Tenev, Changpeng Zhao.
- Science & Technology: Jeong Eun-kyeong, Zeng Yuqun, Gwynne Shotwell, Tim Bray, The Vaccine Chasers (Ugur Sahin, Chen Wei, Kizzmekia Corbett, Dan Barouch, and Sarah Gilbert), Covid Tracking Project (Jeff Hammerbacher, Erin Kissane, Robinson Meyer, and Alexis Madrigal), Keller Rinaudo, Anthony Fauci.
- Politics: John Roberts, Abdalla Hamdok, Letitia James, Sviatlana Tsikhanouskaya, Luis Lacalle Pou, Odunayo Eweniyi and Damilola Odufuwa, Patrisse Cullors and Alicia Garza and Opal Tometi, Mohammed bin Zayed Al Nahyan, Madison Cawthorn, Maria Ressa, Tsai Ing-wen.
- Entertainment: Billie Eilish, Bong Joon-ho, Swizz Beatz and Timbaland, Celeste Barber, Sarah Cooper, Colin Kaepernick, Donna Langley, Guy Fieri, Jason Hehir, Renee Montgomery, Aya Kyogoku and Hisashi Nogami, Marcus Rashford.
- Non-categorized: Papa Giovanni Hospital's Front-Line Workers, Special Purpose Acquisition Companies.

=== 2019 ranking ===
The 2019 ranking was published on December 4, 2019.

- Business: Boris Jordan, Eric Yuan, Shari Redstone, Ethan Brown, Zhang Yong and Shu Ping, Ritesh Agarwal, Rhianna, Alex Blumberg and Matt Lieber, Vicki Hollub, Ann Sarnoff, Emma Walmsley, Doug McMillon, Kevin Mayer, Brian Niccol, Popeyes' fried chicken sandwich, Ramon Ang, Kylie Jenner.
- Finance: Stephanie Kelton, James Mwangi, Jon McAuliffe and Michael Kharitonov, David Marcus, Bruce Flatt, Gita Gopinath, Mortimer "Tim" Buckley, Robert Smith.
- Tech & Science: Ankiti Bose, Lisa Su, Tobias Lütke, Event Horizon Telescope leadership team, Rappi founders (Simón Borrero, Sebastian Mejia, and Felipe Villamarin), Joey Levin.
- Politics: Jacinda Ardern, Greta Thunberg, Marek Sekielski & Tomasz Sekielski, Jon Stewart, Jeff Zucker, Ekrem Imamoglu, Sabine Weyand, Stacey Abrams, Hong Kong protestors, Mette Frederiksen.
- Entertainment: Lil Nas X, Gabriela Cámara, United States women's national soccer team, Phoebe Waller-Bridge, David Simon, Kevin Feige, Simone Biles, Bhushan Kumar, Kaws.

=== 2018 ranking ===
The 2018 list featured other separated groups such as The Usual Suspects, for recurring appearing people, and also Ones to Watch, some of which nominated for 2018's ranking. It was published in the Bloomberg Businessweek issue of the 10th of December 2018.

- Business: Ben van Beurden, Audrey Gelman, Leanne Caret, Stuart Vevers, Brian Roberts, Sonia Cheng, Nguyễn Thị Phương Thảo, Bruce Linton.
- Politics: Time's Up Legal Defense Fund (Tina Tchen, Roberta Kaplan, Hilary Rosen, Fatima Goss Graves), Alexandria Ocasio-Cortez, Tim Scott, Chrystia Freeland, Liu He, Gavin Barwell, Rose Marcario, José Andrés, Xavier Becerra, Andrés Manuel López Obrador, Abiy Ahmed, Cyril Ramaphosa, Mahathir Mohamad, Mick Mulvaney.
- Finance: The Fed's nucleus (Jerome Powell, Richard Clarida, John Williams, Randal Quarles, Lael Brainard), Michael Gelband, Abigail Johnson, Cathie Wood, Guilherme Benchimol, Eric Glen Weyl and Eric Posner, Steven Maijoor, Whitney Wolfe Herd, Kenneth Hayne, Stacey Cunningham.
- Tech & Science: Amy Hood, Nadiem Makarim, John Maraganore and Jeff Marrazzo, Mukesh Ambani, John Krafcik, Daniel Ek, Mudassir Sheikha, Joy Buolamwini and Timnit Gebru, Sarah Friar, Donna Strickland, Drew Houston.
- Entertainment: Taylor Swift, Tiffany Haddish, Kenya Barris, BTS, Jenny Saville, Ryan Coogler, Tim Sweeney, Reese Witherspoon, Byron Allen.
- Not-categorized: Founders of March for Our Lives (David Hogg, X González, Delaney Tarr, Ryan Deitsch).

=== 2017 ranking ===
The 2017 list featured a new categorization of individuals and eliminated the ranked positions. It was published in the Bloomberg Businessweek issue of the 4th of December 2017.

- Business: Bobby Kotick, Ken Frazier, Yoshiaki Koizumi, Marillyn Hewson, Marcos Galperin, Aliko Dangote, Marc Lore, Andrew Zobler, Jeff Bezos, Paul Gaudio, Mary Barra, Charif Souki, Alessandro Michele.
- Politics: Nikki Haley, Mohammed bin Salman, Susan Collins and Lisa Murkowski, Margrethe Vestager, Scott Pruitt, Beatrice Fihn, Robert Mueller, Rachel Maddow, Michel Barnier, Jerry Brown, Luisa Ortega Díaz, Russian botnets (in reference to Russian interference in the 2016 United States elections).
- Finance: David Siegel and John Overdeck, Marty Chavez, David Autor, Igor Tulchinsky, Vitalik Buterin, Raphael Bostic, Natasha Lamb.
- Tech: Masayoshi Son, Diane Greene, Geoffrey Hinton, Richard Pazdur, Francesco De Rubertis, Susan Fowler, Anthony Tan, Luhan Yang, Elon Musk, Martin Lau.
- Entertainment: Lilly Singh, Jill Soloway and Patty Jenkins, Agnes Gund, Ashley Judd and Rose McGowan and Lauren O'Connor (for triggering #MeToo), Jordan Peele, Adam Silver, Chance the Rapper.

=== 2016 ranking ===
The 2016 ranking abandoned the prior rankings' five or six categories, and was a straightforward ranking from most to least influential among the 50. It was published in the Bloomberg Businessweek issue of the October 2016.

- Theresa May (1), Hillary Clinton and Donald Trump (2), Xi Jinping (4), Jeff Bezos (5), Angela Merkel (6), Mario Draghi (7), Janet Yellen (8), Warren Buffett (9), Sergio Moro (10), Elon Musk (11), Bill McNabb (12), Jamie Dimon (13), Zhou Xiaochuan (14), Lloyd Blankfein (15), Larry Fink (16), Jack Ma (17), Jay Y. Lee (18), Loretta Lynch (19), Carl Icahn (20), Sergio Ermotti (21), Jeffrey Gundlach (22), John Stumpf (23), Mary Erdoes (24), Masayoshi Son (25), Charlie Scharf (26), Paul Taubman (27), Mark Carney (28), Joseph Stiglitz (29), Vladimir Putin (30), Stephen Schwarzman (31), Paul Singer (32), Michael Pettis (33), Lael Brainard (34), Marc Benioff (35), Robert Gordon (36), Margrethe Vestager (37), Ruth Porat (38), Mark Zuckerberg (39), Travis Kalanick (40), Jorge Paulo Lemann (41), Prince Mohammed Bin Salman (42), Wang Jianlin (43), Raj Chetty (44), Ken Moelis (45), Blythe Masters (46), Mary Barra (47), Jim Coulter (48), Larry Summers (49), John Oliver (50)

=== 2015 ranking ===
The 2015 ranking was published in the November 2015 issue of Bloomberg Markets. Unlike previous rankings, it included heads of state and government, and ranked all individuals mentioned from 1 (Janet Yellen) to 50 (Ruchir Sharma). It also added a sixth category compared with previous rankings, focused on technological innovation and venture capital.

- corporate power Builders: Tim Cook (3), Warren Buffett (5), Jeff Bezos (15), Jorge Paulo Lemann (17), Akio Toyoda (29), Ellen Kullman (32), Wang Jianlin (37), Jimmy Lai (40), Aliko Dangote (41), Richard Davis (22)
- Bankers: Lloyd Blankfein (8), Jamie Dimon (11), Ana Botín (16), Elizabeth Warren (19), Tidjane Thiam (23), John Stumpf (36), Jiang Jianqing (39)
- Policy Shapers: Janet Yellen (1), Xi Jinping (2), Barack Obama (6), Angela Merkel (9), Narendra Modi (13), Mario Draghi (14), Paul Krugman (30), Wang Qishan (33), John Taylor (43), George Osborne (45)
- Tech Builders: Carl Icahn (7), Reid Hoffman (10), Fan Bao (22), Ruth Porat (24), Elon Musk (25), Marc Andreessen (27), Renaud Laplanche (28), Blythe Masters (44), Elizabeth Holmes (47), Jane Gladstone (49)
- Money Managers: Larry Fink (4), Abigail Johnson (12), Ray Dalio (18), Jeffrey Gundlach (21), Paul Singer (26), Jonathan Gray (34), Ken Griffin (35), Michael Kim (42)
- Thinkers: Thomas Piketty (20), Pope Francis (31), Christine Lagarde (38), Richard Thaler (46), Mo Ibrahim (48), Ruchir Sharma (50)

=== 2014 ranking ===
The 2014 ranking was published in the October 2014 issue of Bloomberg Markets.

- Money Managers: Leon Cooperman, Mary Erdoes, Larry Fink, Carl Icahn, Helena Morrissey, Stephen Schwarzman, Paul Singer, Yngve Slyngstad, Byron Trott, Jeffrey Ubben.
- Thinkers: Timothy Garton Ash, Jack Bogle, Lael Brainard, Satyajit Das, Charmian Gooch, Paul Graham, Charles Grant, Kathy Matsui, Jacqueline Novogratz, Thomas Piketty.
- Corporate Power Brokers: Rinat Akhmetov, Mary Barra, Warren Buffett, Tim Cook, Guo Guangchang, Jeffrey Immelt, Jack Ma, Elon Musk, Xavier Niel, Igor Sechin.
- Bankers: Arundhati Bhattacharya, Lloyd Blankfein, Ana Patricia Botin, James Gorman, Jiang Jianqing, Rose Lee, Kenneth Moelis, John Stumpf, Axel Weber.
- Policy Makers: Preet Bharara, Mario Draghi, Jason Furman, Idris Jala, Benjamin Lawsky, George Osborne, Raghuram Rajan, Xiao Gang, Janet Yellen, Zhou Xiaochuan.

=== 2013 ranking ===
The 2013 ranking was published in the October 2013 issue of Bloomberg Markets.

- Bankers: Paul Achleitner, Lloyd Blankfein, Ana Patricia Botin, Jamie Dimon, Isabelle Ealet, Sergio Ermotti, Jiang Jianqing, Gordon Nixon, Ruth Porat, John Stumpf
- Policy Makers: Akira Amari, Preet Bharara, Mark Carney, Mario Draghi, Jacob J. Lew, Ngozi Okonjo-Iweala, Raghuram Rajan, Mary Jo White, Xiao Gang, Janet Yellen.
- Money Managers: Hamed bin Zayed Al Nahyan, Leon Black, Mary Erdoes, Larry Fink, Carl Icahn, Daniel Ivascyn, Daniel Loeb, Helena Morrissey, Stephen Schwarzman, Dominique Senequier.
- Power Brokers: Jeff Bezos, Warren Buffett, Ivan Glasenberg, Lee Kun Hee, Jorge Paulo Lemann, Maurice Levy, Marissa Mayer, Dilip Shanghvi, Masayoshi Son, Alisher Usmanov.
- Thinkers: Dan Ariely, Esther Duflo, Robert J. Gordon, Salman Khan, Paul Krugman, Michael Mann, Elon Musk, Sheryl Sandberg, Michael Woodford, Andy Xie.

=== 2012 ranking ===
The 2012 ranking was published in the October 2012 issue of Bloomberg Markets.

- Corporate Power Brokers: Warren Buffett, Chung Mong Koo, Tim Cook, John Fredriksen, the Koch Brothers, Yuri Milner, Ginni Rometty, Carlos Slim, Tadashi Yanai, Mark Zuckerberg.
- Money Managers: Cliff Asness, Hamed bin Zayed Al Nahyan, Chase Coleman, Leon Cooperman, Ray Dalio, Mary Erdoes, Larry Fink, Bill Gross, Jeffrey Gundlach, Michael Platt.
- Policy Makers: Mamata Banerjee, Ben S. Bernanke, Preet Bharara, Mario Draghi, Timothy F. Geithner, Paul Ryan, Aung San Suu Kyi, Adair Turner, Janet Yellen, Zhou Xiaochuan.
- Thinkers: Maury Harris, Glenn Hubbard, Daniel Kahneman, Paul Krugman, Carmen Reinhart, Alan Simpson, Hans-Werner Sinn, Joseph Stiglitz, John Taylor, Nicolas Veron.
- Bankers: Lloyd Blankfein, Emilio Botin, Jamie Dimon, Isabelle Ealet, Andre Esteves, Anshu Jain, Jiang Jianqing, Gerald McCaughey, Ruth Porat, John Stumpf.

=== 2011 ranking ===
The 2011 ranking was published in the October 2011 issue of Bloomberg Markets.

- Policy Makers: Ben S. Bernanke, Agustin Carstens, Mario Draghi, Timothy F. Geithner, Christine Lagarde, Ali Al-Naimi, Masaaki Shirakawa, Wang Qishan, Elizabeth Warren, Zhou Xiaochuan.
- Bankers: Lloyd Blankfein, Robert Diamond, Jamie Dimon, James Gorman, Stuart Gulliver, Anshu Jain, Jiang Jianqing, Chanda Kochhar, Kenneth Moelis, Vikram Pandit.
- Money Managers: Steven Cohen, Ray Dalio, Laurence Fink, Jeremy Grantham, William Gross, Ho Ching, Lou Jiwei, Mark Mobius, James Simons, George Soros.
- Corporate Innovators: Mukesh Ambani, Eike Batista, Warren Buffett, Jeffrey Immelt, Steven Jobs, Mikhail Prokhorov, Wilbur Ross, David Rubenstein, Carlos Slim Helu, Ratan Tata,
- Thinkers: Carson Block, Martin Feldstein, Jan Hatzius, Daniel Kahneman, Paul Krugman, Jim O'Neill, Carmen Reinhart, Robert Shiller, Joseph Stiglitz, Nassim Taleb.

== Multiple appearances ==
=== Listed six times ===
- Lloyd Blankfein (2011, 2012, 2013, 2014, 2015, 2016)
- Warren Buffett (2011, 2012, 2013, 2014, 2015, 2016)
- Mario Draghi (2011, 2012, 2013, 2014, 2015, 2016)
- Laurence D. Fink (2011, 2012, 2013, 2014, 2015, 2016)

=== Listed five times ===
- Jamie Dimon (2011, 2012, 2013, 2015, 2016)
- Jiang Jianqing (2011, 2012, 2013, 2014, 2015)
- John Stumpf (2012, 2013, 2014, 2015, 2016)
- Elon Musk (2013, 2014, 2015, 2016, 2017)
- Janet Yellen (2012, 2013, 2014, 2015, 2016)

=== Listed four times ===
- Jeff Bezos (2013, 2015, 2016, 2017)
- Mary Callahan Erdoes (2012, 2013, 2014, 2016)
- Carl Icahn (2013, 2014, 2015, 2016)
- Paul Krugman (2011, 2012, 2013, 2015)
- Ruth Porat (2012, 2013, 2015, 2016)
- Zhou Xiaochuan (2011, 2012, 2014, 2016)

=== Listed three times ===
- Mary Barra (2014, 2016, 2017)
- Preet Bharara (2012, 2013, 2014)
- Ana Patricia Botín (2013, 2014, 2015)
- Tim Cook (2012, 2014, 2015)
- Ray Dalio (2011, 2012, 2015)
- Jeffrey Gundlach (2012, 2015, 2016)
- Jorge Paulo Lemann (2013, 2015, 2016)
- Ken Moelis (2011, 2014, 2016)
- Stephen A. Schwarzman (2013, 2014, 2016)
- Paul Singer (2014, 2015, 2016)
- Masayoshi Son (2013, 2016, 2017)
- Joseph Stiglitz (2011, 2012, 2016)
- Lael Brainard (2014, 2016, 2018)
