= List of Brearley School alumnae =

This list of alumnae of the Brearley School includes graduates and non-graduate former students.

- Virginia Ogilvy, Countess of Airlie, lady-in-waiting to Queen Elizabeth II
- Modupe Akinola, psychologist and academic
- Emma Allen, cartoon editor for The New Yorker
- Genevieve Angelson, actor
- Blue Balliett, author of Chasing Vermeer
- Mary Ellin Barrett, novelist
- Mary Catherine Bateson, writer and anthropologist
- Anne Baxter, actor
- Susan Berresford, foundation executive
- Devika Bhise, actor
- Jenny Bicks, television producer and screenwriter, What a Girl Wants and Sex and the City
- Margaret McKelvy Bird, archaeologist
- Henrietta Buckmaster, author
- Mary Steichen Calderone, physician and public-health advocate
- Oona, Lady Chaplin, social leader
- Eva Chen, director of fashion partnerships at Instagram
- Lucinda Childs, dancer and choreographer
- Mabel Choate, Gardener, collector and philanthropist
- Jill Clayburgh, actor
- Emily Cross, fencer, Olympic silver medalist
- Alexandra Daddario, actress and model
- Anne d'Harnoncourt, museum director
- Annie Dorsen, theater artist, MacArthur Fellowship awardee
- Fernanda Eberstadt, novelist, essayist, critic
- Katharine Evarts, politician
- Elizabeth Fishel, journalist and writer, Reunion: The Girls We Used to Be, the Women We Became
- Lacey Fosburgh, journalist and author, Closing Time: The True Story of the Goodbar Murder
- Virginia Kneeland Frantz, pathologist, pioneer in the study of pancreatic tumors
- Betty Furness, actress, consumer affairs activist, current affairs commentator
- Virginia Gildersleeve, dean, Barnard College, statesperson
- Jane Ginsburg, law professor
- Jane Gladstone, pioneer in the fintech industry, president of IntraFi Network, investment banker
- Carolyn Goodman, mayor of Las Vegas
- Phyllis Goodhart Gordan, scholar of the Renaissance
- Betsy Gotbaum, public advocate for the City of New York
- Isca Greenfield-Sanders, artist
- Emily Hoffman, socialite
- Ruth Sulzberger Holmberg, publisher
- Winifred Holt, sculptor, welfare worker; founder of the nonprofit that is now Lighthouse International
- Nora Johnson, novelist, The World of Henry Orient
- Judith Jones, editor and food writer
- Caroline Kennedy, diplomat, author and philanthropist
- Nancy Krieger, epidemiologist
- Maude Latour, singer–songwriter
- Téa Leoni, actress
- Bethel Leslie, actress
- Sarah Lewis, professor at Harvard University, art curator, and TED Talk presenter
- Priscilla Johnson McMillan, journalist, translator, author, historian
- Caryn Marooney, business executive
- Ruth Messinger, Manhattan borough president
- Sara Moulton, chef, author and television personality
- Elisabeth Murdoch, media executive
- Victoria Newhouse, architecture critic
- Diane Paulus, opera and theater director; artistic director, American Repertory Theater
- Mary Louise Perlman, musician
- Kathleen Ridder, philanthropist, educator, writer, activist for women's equality
- Mary Rodgers, children's author and composer
- Anne Roiphe, journalist, novelist
- Katie Roiphe, writer
- Niki de Saint Phalle, artist
- Dorothy Schiff, publisher of the New York Post
- Rose Schlossberg
- Tatiana Schlossberg
- Kyra Sedgwick, actor
- Maggie Shnayerson, journalist and blogger
- Helen Farr Sloan, educator, artist, philanthropist
- Sarah Solovay, singer–songwriter
- Kim Stolz, fashion model personality
- Marina Vaizey, art critic and author
- Elizabeth Chai Vasarhelyi, Academy Award winner, director and producer of documentary films
- Emily Vermeule, scholar and archaeologist
- Erica Wagner, literary editor for The Times
- Frieda Schiff Warburg, philanthropist
- Katharine Weymouth, former publisher of The Washington Post
- Flora Payne Whitney, patron of the arts
