= Pangalos =

Pangalos (Greek: Πάγκαλος) is a Greek surname which may refer to:

- Theodoros Pangalos (1878–1952), Greek general, politician and dictator
- Theodoros Pangalos (b. 1938), Greek politician
- Mene Pangalos, British neuroscientist
- Georgios Pangalos (b. 1936), Greek sports shooter
- Konstantinos Pangalos, Greek football player
- Nikos Pangalos (1915–2002), Greek football manager
