= David Grainger =

British venture capitalist

- Born: 12 October 1966 (age 59)
- Education: Cambridge University
- Occupations: venture capitalist, medicxi, biotechnology executive, Methuselah Health Ltd., blogger

David Grainger is a partner at medicxi, a European life sciences-oriented venture capital firm and chief executive officer of Methuselah Health Ltd., a drug development company doing proteomics research in the longevity space.

He was formerly with Index Ventures, an international venture capital firm with offices in London, Geneva and San Francisco, in the firm's life sciences practice. He also writes for Forbes.com on topics related to the pharmaceutical industry.

== Education ==
Reared in England, Grainger graduated with degree in Natural Sciences (Biochemistry) from Cambridge University in 1989, and a PhD in Vascular Cell Biology from the same institution in 1992.

== Career ==
After receiving his PhD, Grainger undertook post-doctoral research in the British Heart Foundation Smooth Muscle Cell laboratory at Cambridge University. Following publications in Nature and elsewhere setting out his Protective Cytokine Hypothesis explaining the role of the cytokine TGF-beta 1 in the cardiovascular system, Grainger was appointed principal investigator in the Department of Medicine at his alma mater, Cambridge University, in 1997.

While at Cambridge University, Grainger founded life sciences companies including FingerPrint Diagnostics (2001), and Funxional Therapeutics (2005). FingerPrint Diagnostics merged with SmartBead Technologies to form Pronostics, a molecular diagnostics company, in 2006. Funxional Therapeutics, based on an anti-inflammatory drug candidate spun-out from Grainger's Cambridge University lab, became an Index Ventures portfolio company where Grainger also served as chief scientific officer until it was sold to Boehringer Ingelheim in 2012.

Grainger joined Index Ventures in 2012, and a blogger on topics related to the pharmaceutical industry under the pen name “DrugBaron”. where he was involved with funding and advising a variety of companies, including XO1, a biotech company developing an anticoagulant, where he served as chairman and interim CEO before it was sold to Johnson & Johnson He co-founded medicxi in February 2016 with fellow former Index Ventures partners Francesco De Rubertis, Kevin Johnson and Michele Ollier.

== Publications and Patents ==
Grainger has co-authored a number of papers in peer-reviewed scientific journals, including Nature, Science and Nature Medicine.

Grainger formerly blogged under the pen name “DrugBaron” on a range of topics related to the pharmaceutical industry, and now has a column on similar topics on Forbes.com.
