= Yamibuy =

American electronic commerce company

Yami
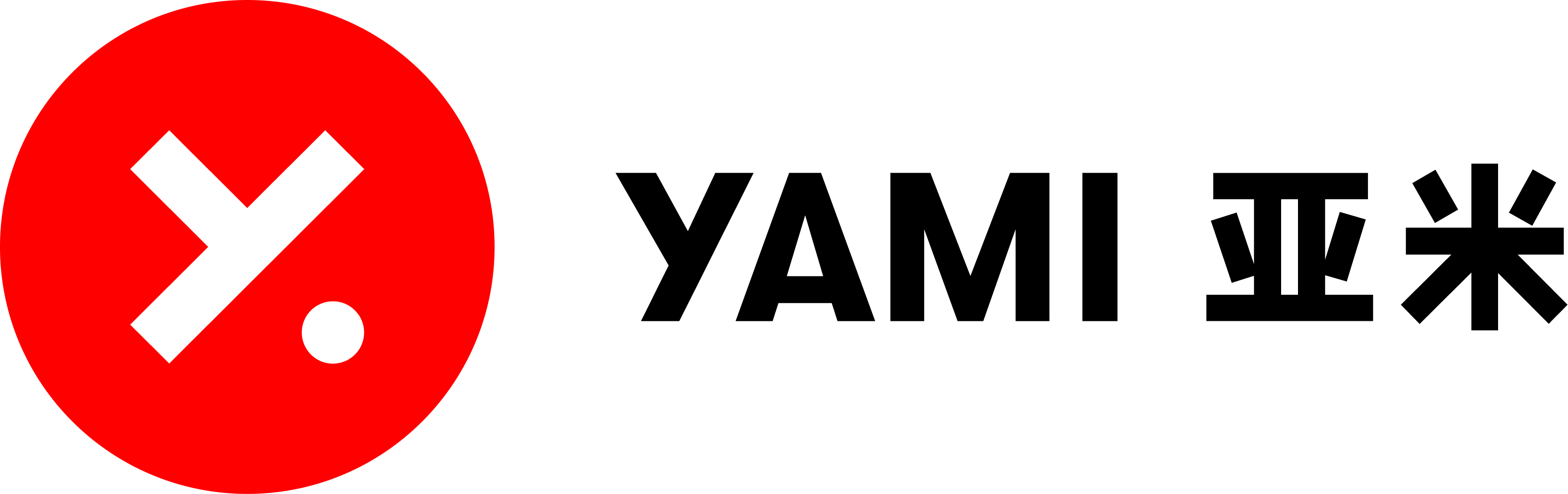
- Formerly: Yamibuy
- Industry: E-commerce
- Founded: March 2013; 12 years ago
- Headquarters: Brea, California
- Area served: United States
- Number of employees: 201-500 (2022)
- Website: yamibuy.com

Established in March 2013, Yami (亚米) is an online Asian marketplace.

== Description ==
Yami was founded by Alex Zhou, a Chinese student attending Kansas State University. During his studies, Zhou was frustrated by the scarcity and price of Chinese goods in the United States; as noted by the South China Morning Post, Zhou was forced to make a two-hour drive to Kansas City in order to procure authentic goods from China. This and other logistical realities frustrated Zhou, and led to the-then student conceiving of a company that could market Asian goods online.

Zhou graduated from the Kansas State University in 2013, after which he moved to Los Angeles to formulate the idea for an e-commerce website which could be used to market and distribute imports from China. He raised 50,000 dollars, and officially established Yami in March 2013. As noted by the South China Morning Post, the new company filled a niche in the stunted market for Chinese goods as two large China-based suppliers, Alibaba and JD.com, did not import Chinese goods into other countries. As such, most Asian supermarkets in the United States imported goods directly from suppliers in China. Zhou's early efforts to gain direct access to these suppliers on behalf of Yami included visiting Asian supermarkets and taking notes on the names of potential suppliers. He then contacted these companies and directly opened business accounts with them, allowing for Yami (which Zhou was operating out of a warehouse) direct access to imported goods. The company then sold these goods in an online marketplace. Using this method of sale, the website gained popularity among Chinese Americans and Chinese students studying in American colleges.

Following its founding, the company grew rapidly, and by 2018 was handling $100 million in transactions a year. By 2022, Yami has surpassed 2 million registered customers in the U.S., provided more than 260,000 stock-keeping units (SKUs) across food, beauty, health, and home categories with over 4,000 brands. Some sources attributed the company's growth to Yami emulating the business practices of larger, Asian American companies which tie social media notifications with product purchases. The company headquarters are in Brea, California.

== History ==
- In March 2013, Yami launched in Los Angeles, California.
- In 2014, Yami launched its Beauty and Home category, and the monthly GMV had reached $1.5 million U.S. dollars.
- In 2015, Yami Marketplace launched and moved into a business-to-consumer (B2C) and business-to-business (B2B) hybrid model.
- By 2016, Yami's monthly GMV reached $8 million U.S. dollars and exceeded $47 million a year.
- In 2017, Yami announced a $10 Million Series A investment led by GGV Capital.
- In June 2019, Yami signed an MOU agreement with South Korean-based leading food retailer Haitai at the Consulate General of the Republic of Korea. This agreement solidified Asian brands' presence in North America.
- In 2020, Yami ventured into fresh food delivery, Yami Fresh, in the great Los Angeles area during the pandemic and continually expand to the entire United States.
- In 2021, Yami partnered with Michelin Guide Restaurant Ivan Ramen to create an ultimate kit for Japanese home cooking to promote Asian culture through food.
- In 2022, Yami signed a fulfillment services agreement to help increase Asian companies’ presence in North America and extend their online marketplace. The same year, Yami raised $50M Series B to boost its online Asian marketplace and connect shoppers to Asian cultures, and continually fulfilling its mission, “Bringing the world closer for everyone to experience and enjoy.”

== Funding ==
In July, 2017 it announced its $10M series A funding led by GGV Capital. New Oriental Education & Technology Group Inc. and K2VC also participated in the round.

In 2022, Yami announced it has raised a $50 million Series B co-led by Altos Ventures and Balsam Bay Partners, with participation from previous backers J.P Morgan and GGV Capital. Yami uses the latest funding to further its U.S. expansion by opening up another warehouse in New Jersey to speed up delivery times, and to invest in technology like artificial intelligence and big data to strengthen its supply chain and improve customer experience.
