= Francis Crick Institute =

Biomedical research centre in London

- Established: 2010 (16 years ago)
- Type: Research institute
- Registration no.: England and Wales: 1140062
- Purpose: Medical research
- Location: 1 Midland Road, London NW1 1AT, United Kingdom
- Coordinates: 51.5315°N 0.1289°W
- Chief Executive: Edith Heard
- Website: crick.ac.uk

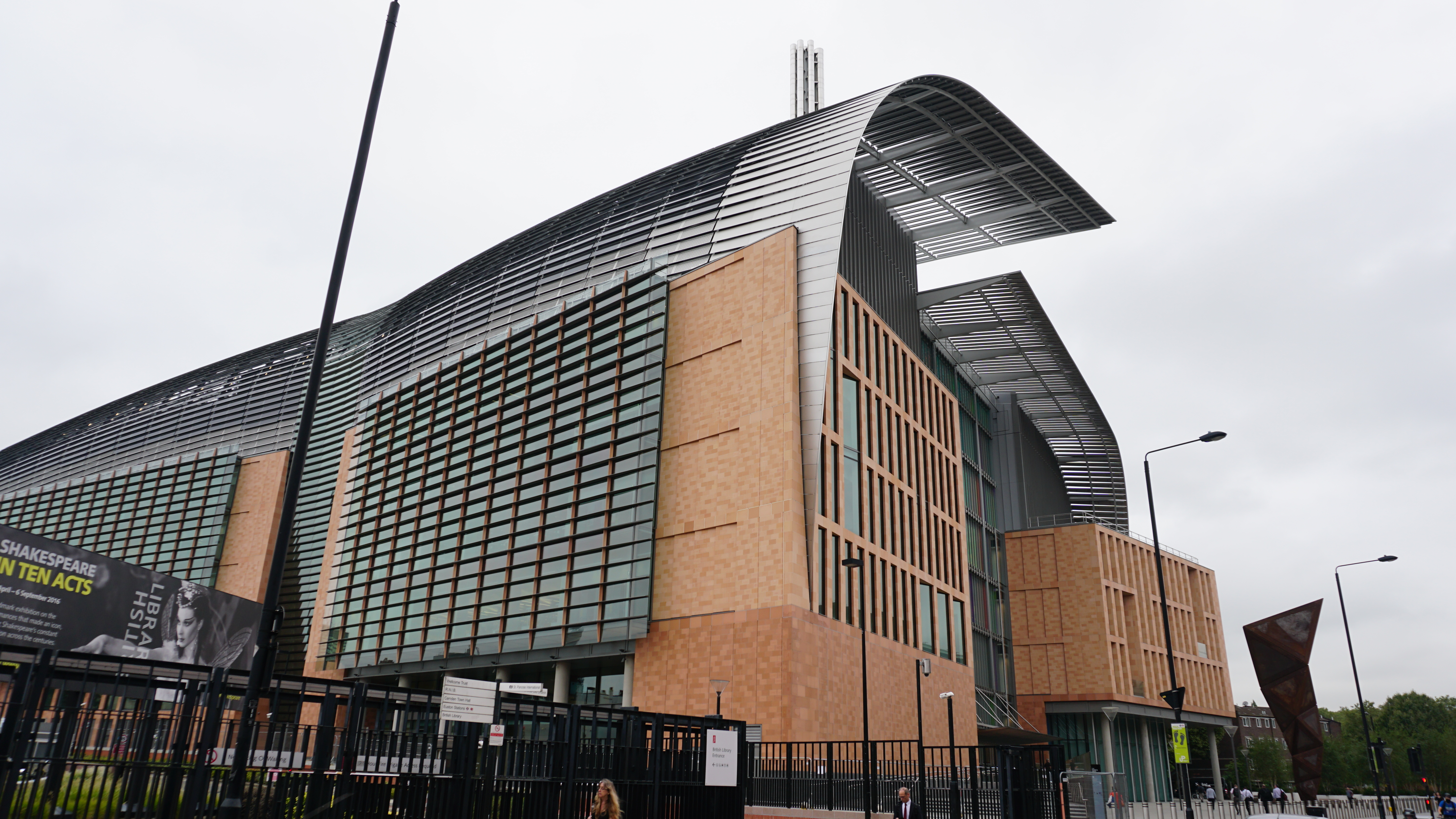
Francis Crick Institute main building

The Francis Crick Institute (formerly the UK Centre for Medical Research and Innovation) is a biomedical research centre in London, which was established in 2010 and opened in 2016. The institute is a partnership between Cancer Research UK, Imperial College London, King's College London (KCL), the Medical Research Council, University College London (UCL) and the Wellcome Trust. The institute has 1,500 staff, including 1,250 scientists, and an annual budget of over £100 million, making it the biggest single biomedical laboratory in Europe.

The institute is named after the molecular biologist, biophysicist, and neuroscientist Francis Crick, co-discoverer of the structure of DNA, who shared the 1962 Nobel Prize in Physiology or Medicine with James Watson and Maurice Wilkins. Unofficially, the Crick has been called Sir Paul's Cathedral, a reference to Sir Paul Nurse and St Paul's Cathedral in London.

== History ==
=== Background ===
In 2003, the Medical Research Council decided that its National Institute for Medical Research (NIMR) would need to relocate from Mill Hill. A Task Force, one of whose external members was Sir Paul Nurse, was established to consider options. Sites eventually rejected included Addenbrooke's and the National Temperance Hospital.

On 11 February 2005, it was announced that NIMR would relocate to University College London, but this was dependent on funding from the government's Large Facilities Capital Fund and did not proceed.

In December 2006, the Cooksey Review, commissioned by Chancellor Gordon Brown in March, was published. It assessed the strategic priorities of UK health research, highlighting in particular the importance of translating basic research into health and economic benefits.

=== Founding: initially named as UKCMRI ===
The creation of the UK Centre for Medical Research and Innovation (UKCMRI) was announced by the then British Prime Minister, Gordon Brown, on 5 December 2007. On 13 June 2008, the 3.5 acre eventual site on Brill Place was bought for UKCMRI for £85m, of which £46.75m was provided by MRC. The use of Brill Place for the UKCMRI faced objections by local residents of Somers Town, with some locals wanting the site to be used for housing.

David Cooksey was chair of the Francis Crick Institute from 2009 to August 2017.

On 15 July 2010 it was announced that Nobel laureate Paul Nurse would be the first director and chief executive of the UKCMRI. He took up his post on 1 January 2011. On 20 October 2010, the Chancellor of the Exchequer, George Osborne, confirmed that the British Government would be contributing £220 million over four years towards the capital cost of the centre. The planning was granted despite the campaign of St Pancras and Somers Town Planning Action (SPA) who argued the central London site did not represent value for taxpayers and a Labour councillor who raised the local shortage of housing.

Finally, on 11 November 2010, Cancer Research UK, the Medical Research Council, UCL and the Wellcome Trust signed an agreement to establish the UKCMRI as a charitable foundation, subject to the agreement of the Charity Commission. On 14 December 2010, Camden Council granted the planning approval for the scheme which had been submitted on 1 September.

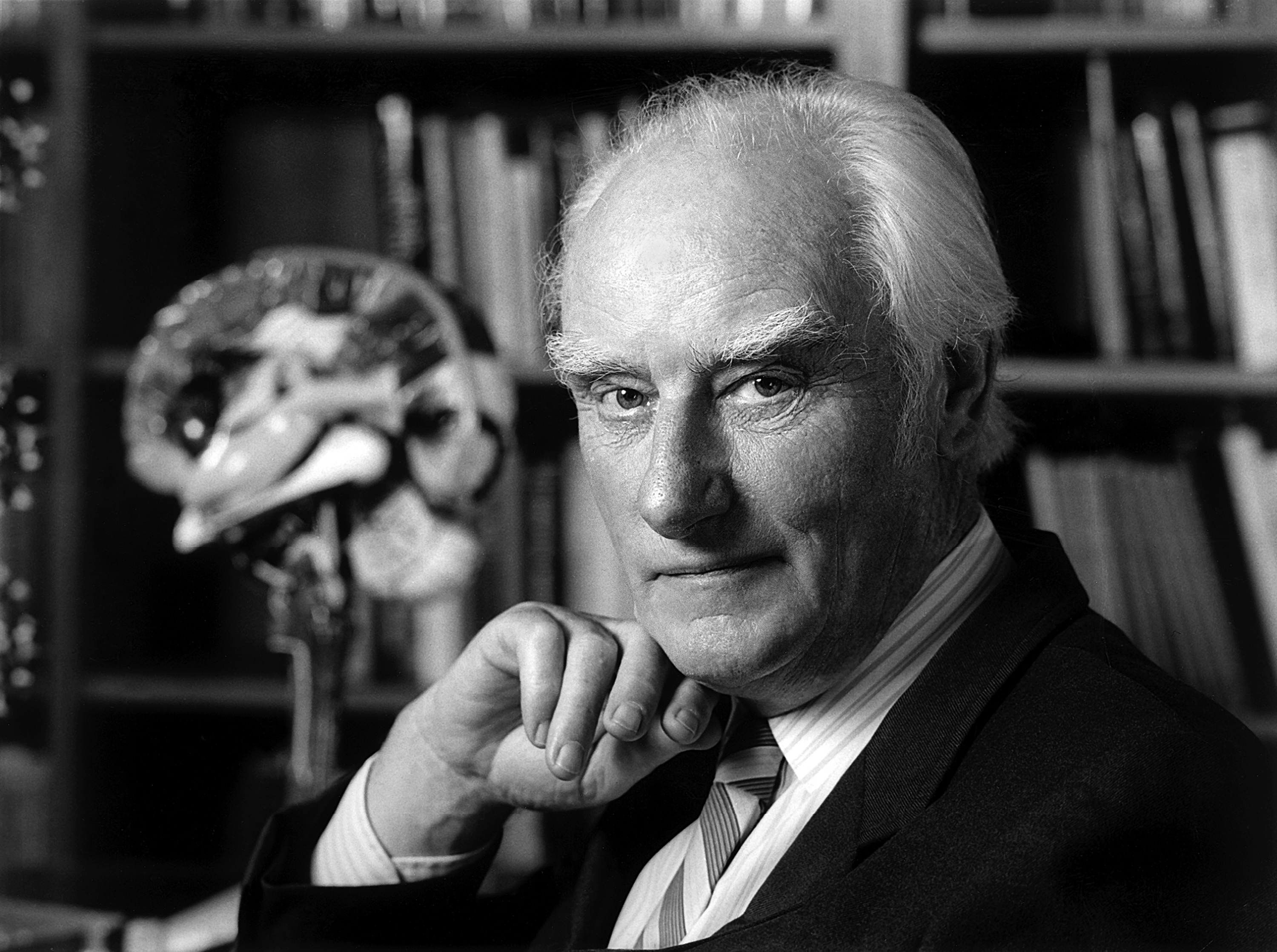
Francis Crick (above) and James Watson were two Cambridge scholars who created the first double-helix model of DNA and are the "fathers of modern genetics".

On 15 April 2011 it was announced that Imperial College London and King's College London would be joining the UKCMRI as partners and that both had signed a memorandum of understanding to commit £40 million each to the project.

In May 2011 the UK Government's Science and Technology committee published a report which commended the scientific vision but "expressed reservations about the location" in Central London.

=== Renamed as Francis Crick Institute ===
On 25 May 2011, it was announced that the UKCMRI would be renamed the Francis Crick Institute in July to coincide with ground being broken on the construction of its building, in honour of the British scientist and Nobel Prize winner Francis Crick. In July 2011 the UKCMRI was renamed the Francis Crick Institute. A dedication ceremony for the new building was held on 11 October 2011, attended by Mayor of London Boris Johnson, David Willetts MP and Sir Paul Nurse. Francis Crick's surviving daughter Gabrielle gave a short speech, while his son Mike donated Crick's California licence plate "AT GC" into a time capsule buried during the ceremony. On 6 June 2013 a topping out ceremony was held, the institute's science strategy was announced and a £3 million grant from the Wolfson Foundation was confirmed.

In mid August 2016, construction work finished and the building was handed over. The first scientists moved in on 1 September. On 9 November 2016 the Francis Crick Institute was officially opened by the Queen, accompanied by the Duke of Edinburgh and the Duke of York. During the visit a portrait of Francis Crick by Robert Ballagh was unveiled. As part of her tour, The Queen started the sequencing of the genome of the Crick's director, Sir Paul Nurse – all three billion letters in his DNA code.

== Governance and organisation ==
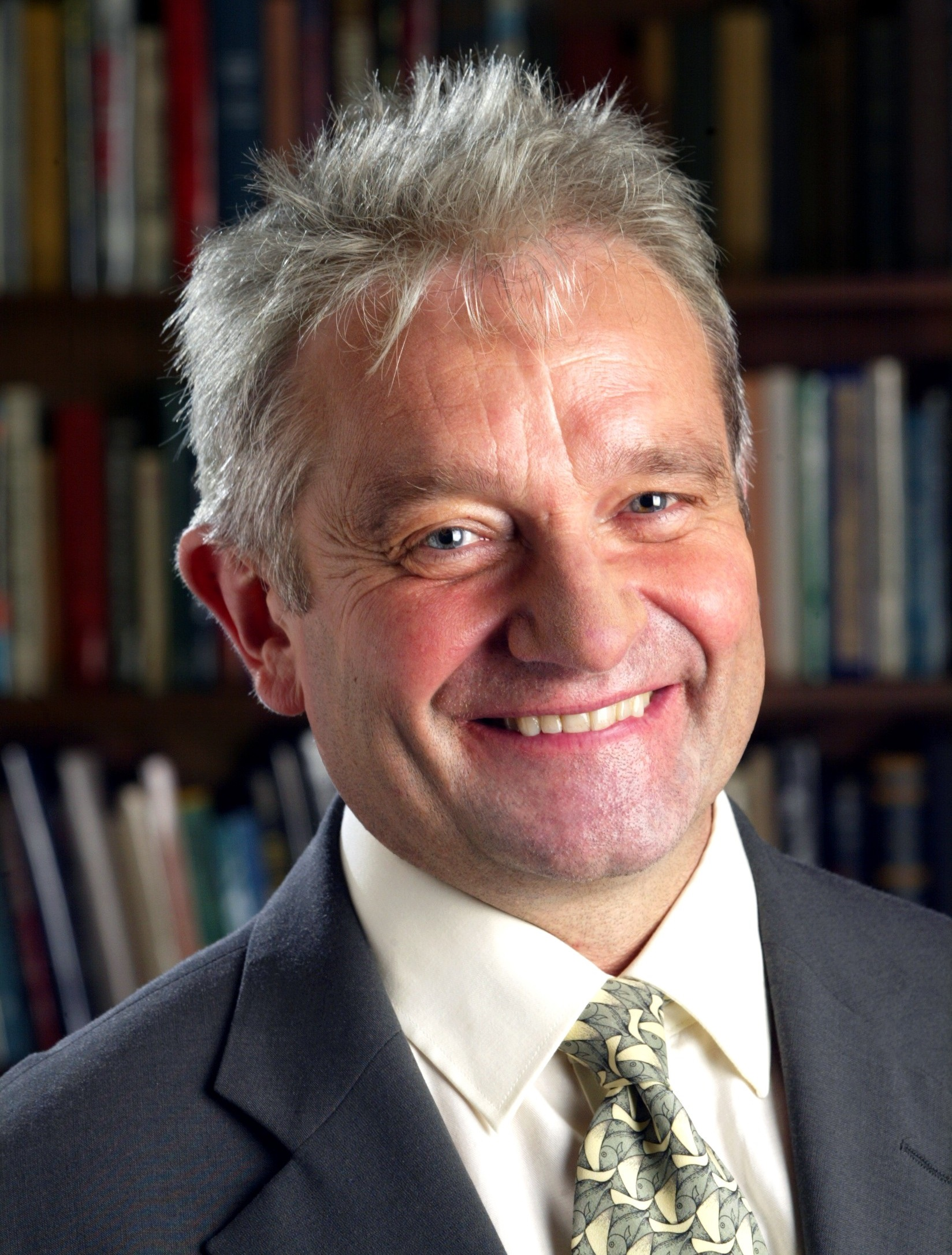
Paul Nurse, director and chief executive of the Institute, 2011–2025

=== Leadership ===
The Crick is led by a board of trustees, an executive committee, a scientific management committee and a scientific advisory board. As of 2024, the board is chaired by John Browne and includes Kate Bingham, Adrian Bird, Patrick Chinnery, Isabelle Ealet, Iain Foulkes, Brian Gilvary, Mene Pangalos, Geraint Rees, John-Arne Røttingen, Mary Ryan and Richard Trembath.

In July 2024, it was announced that Edith Heard would succeed Paul Nurse as director and chief executive from summer 2025.

The executive committee is staffed by Heard (director and chief executive) and includes Claire Hook (chief operating officer), Richard Treisman (director of research), Candice Cross, Steve Gamblin, Rahul Saxena, Ali Bailey, Michelle Shuttleworth, Stephen Mayhew and Steve Wilson.

=== Partners ===
The participants in the Francis Crick Institute providing funding for its construction and establishment were:

Organisations	Funding	Comments
Medical Research Council	£300 million	Founding partner (UKCMRI), including incorporating their National Institute for Medical Research
Cancer Research UK	£160 million	Founding partner (UKCMRI), including incorporating their London Research Institute
Wellcome Trust	£120 million	Founding partner (UKCMRI)
University College London (UCL)	£40 million	Founding partner (UKCMRI)
Imperial College London	£40 million	
King's College London (KCL)	£40 million	

== Research ==
=== Areas of research ===
The institute is a biomedical discovery institute aiming to help understand why disease develops and to find new ways to treat, diagnose and prevent illnesses such as cancer, heart disease, stroke, infections and neurodegenerative diseases.

=== Current science programme ===
The institute defines its research programme as exploring "seven high-level science questions reflecting both major issues of interest in biomedical research and the current research strategies of its six founders". According to the institute, these questions are:

- How does a living organism acquire form and function?
- How do organisms maintain health and balance throughout life and as they age?
- How can we use biological knowledge to better understand, diagnose and treat human disease?
- How does cancer start, spread and respond to therapy?
- How does the immune system know whether, when and how to react?
- How do microbes and pathogens function and interact with their hosts?
- How does the nervous system detect, store and respond to information and retain that information throughout life?

In July 2015 GlaxoSmithKline was announced as the institute's first commercial partner. The deal involves contribution of resources and personnel to joint projects.

In May 2022, The Francis Crick Institute announced it had received a £50 million pledge from the Chris Banton Foundation, the largest individual philanthropic pledge in the institute's five-year history. The pledge will fund a new meeting hub initiative to accelerate the translation of Crick discoveries into societal benefits.

=== Achievements and impact ===
In 2015, Tomas Lindahl, Emeritus group leader at the Francis Crick Institute and Emeritus director of Cancer Research UK at Clare Hall Laboratory, Hertfordshire, was awarded the Nobel Prize in Chemistry together with Paul Modrich and Aziz Sancar.

In 2016, Professor Tim Bliss, from the Crick, and Professors Graham Collingridge (University of Bristol) and Richard Morris (University of Edinburgh) were awarded The Brain Prize.

== Building and facilities ==
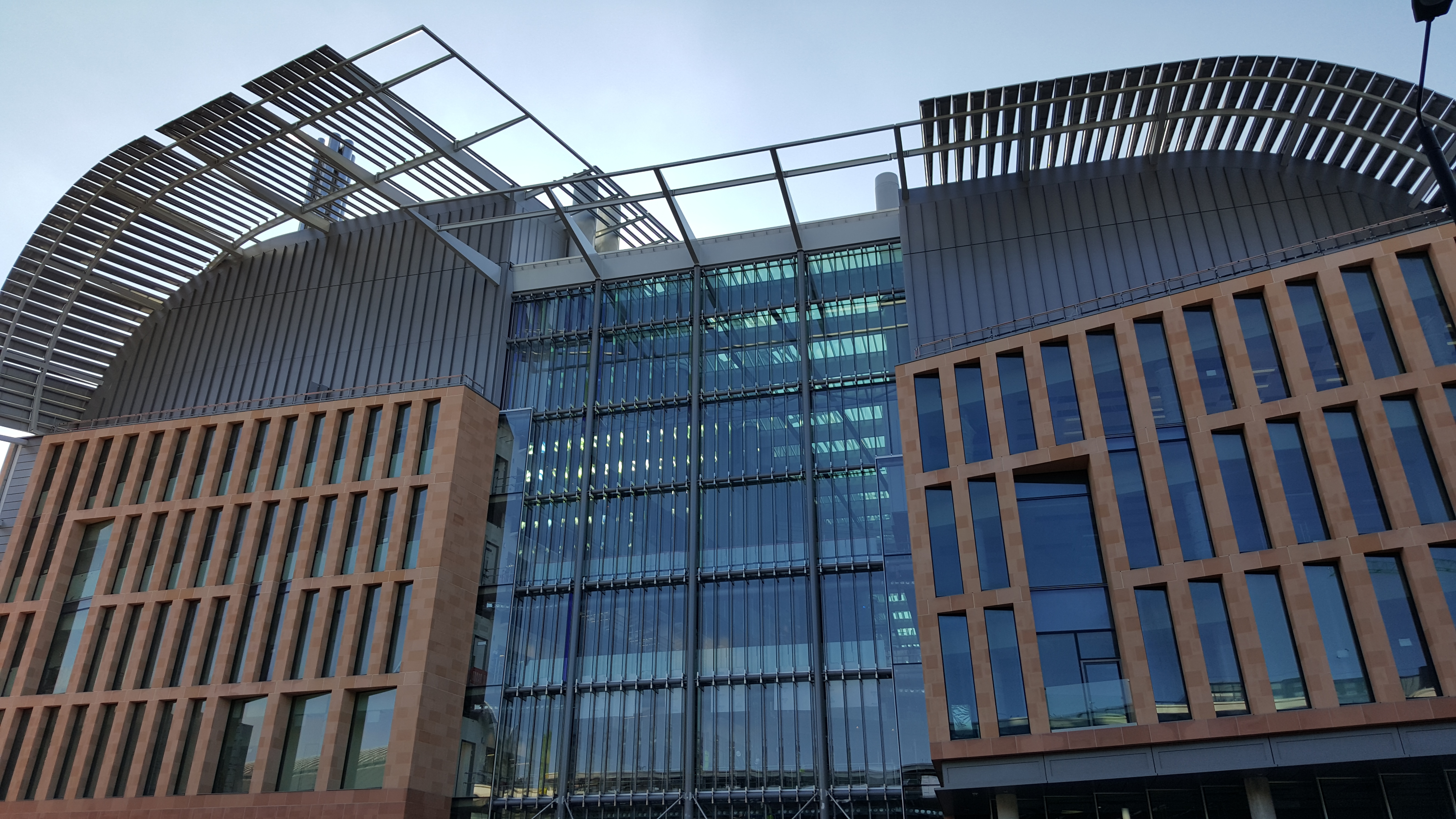
The Francis Crick Institute building in October 2015

The Francis Crick Institute is located in a state-of-the-art building, opened in 2016, built next to St Pancras railway station in the Camden area of Central London. It consists of four reinforced concrete blocks up to eight storeys high plus four basement levels. The total internal floor area is 82,578 m^{2} (98,762 sq yd) including 29,179 m^{2} (34,898 sq yd) of laboratories with 5 km (3.1 mi) of laboratory benching and 21,839 m^{2} (26,119 sq yd) of associated write up space.

As well as state of the art scientific equipment, much of it extremely sensitive to vibration and electromagnetic emissions, and requiring advanced methods of air handling, over a third of the building is given over to plant rooms and services distribution. The facility incorporates a combined heat and power plant in order to provide low-carbon onsite power. Solar panels installed in the roof provide extra renewable power and all light fittings are energy-efficient. The roof also hides the heating and cooling units. A third of the building is below ground to reduce its visible size and provide further protection to sensitive equipment.

Laboratories within the building are arranged over four floors, made up of four interconnected blocks, designed to encourage interaction between scientists working in different research fields. The institute also includes a public exhibition/gallery space, an educational space, a 450-seat auditorium and a community facility.

'Paradigm', a 14-metre high sculpture made of weathered steel and designed by the British artist Conrad Shawcross, was installed outside the main entrance to the institute in 2016. It is one of the largest public sculptures in London.

=== Construction timeline ===
In July 2008 Arup Project Management, who had previously been involved in site evaluation studies (alongside CBRE UK who acted as planning advisors and in the procurement of the site), were appointed by the client UKCMRI as project manager for the institute's chosen location at Brill Place. In August the full professional team was appointed, including architect and lead designer HOK, AKT II (structural engineer), Arup (building services engineering), CBRE Group (UK) (planning consultants) and Turner & Townsend (cost managers). In 2010 PLP Architecture was appointed to collaborate with HOK on the building's external envelope and BMJ architects were retained as a biological research facilities consultant.

Following planning approval by Camden in December 2010, Laing O'Rourke was appointed as main contractor in March 2011.

Construction began in July 2011 and reached practical completion on time and within budget in August 2016, with researchers starting work in the new building in September.

The construction cost was £465 million and including fit-out of the building the capital cost of the project was approximately £700 million.
