= Bao Fan =

Chinese investment banker (born 1970)

- Born: 18 October 1970 (age 55)
- Citizenship: Chinese
- Education: Fudan University; Norwegian School of Management
- Occupations: Investment banker; Investor
- Known for: Founder of China Renaissance; Co-founder of K2VC

Chinese name
- Chinese: 包凡
Transcriptions
Standard Mandarin
- Hanyu Pinyin: Bāo Fán
- IPA: [páʊ fǎn]

Bao Fan (Chinese: 包凡; born 18 October 1970) is a billionaire Chinese investment banker and investor. He is the former chairman and CEO of China Renaissance, an investment bank he founded in 2005. His net worth is estimated at US$1.7 billion.

In 2015, Bao was featured on Bloomberg Markets 50 Most Influential, ranking number 22.

In February 2023, Bao was missing for 2 days, but later it was revealed that he was taken in by Chinese authorities for questioning regarding his former colleagues.

== Early life and education ==
Bao was born in Shanghai to parents who worked in the government. In reference to his parents' placement within the government, Bao notes they were "Nothing senior, I'm not one of the princelings". He went to high school in the US.

He received degrees from Shanghai's Fudan University and the Norwegian School of Management.

== Career ==
Bao worked for Morgan Stanley, Credit Suisse and Morgan Stanley again, in London, New York and Hong Kong. In 2000, Bao left Morgan Stanley to become chief strategic officer at the Chinese start-up AsiaInfo Holdings.

In 2005, Bao founded China Renaissance, a Chinese financial institution dedicated to China's New Economy businesses. China Renaissance Holdings Limited was listed on the Main Board of HKEX in 2018.

China Renaissance started a private equity investment management business in 2013. Bao is the Founding Partner and Chief Investment Officer of China Renaissance's investment management business.

In February 2023, the BBC and other sources reported that Bao had been missing for two days and they were unsure of his whereabouts. The disappearance has caused the stock of China Renaissance to drop by 50 percent, though the company said in a statement that Operations would "continue normally". Later, the company announced that Bao was taken by the Chinese authorities as a part of an investigation targeting Bao's former colleague and the company's former president, Cong Lin.

In February 2024, Bao resigned from all of his roles at China Renaissance.

In August 2025, Fan was reported to have been released, after over two years in detention by Chinese authorities.

== Recognition ==
In February 2016, China Renaissance received FinanceAsia Achievement Awards for "Best China Deal" and "Best Private Equity Deal". The "Best China Deal" was for its role as the financial advisor for Meituan and Dianping's "strategic cooperation". Meituan-Dianping is China's largest group deals website, and in January 2016 it closed a $3.3 billion funding round, valuing the merged company at $18 billion. The company claims that this is China's largest ever funding round for a venture-backed Internet startup.

== Personal life ==
Bao lives in Beijing.
