= Jiang Jianqing =

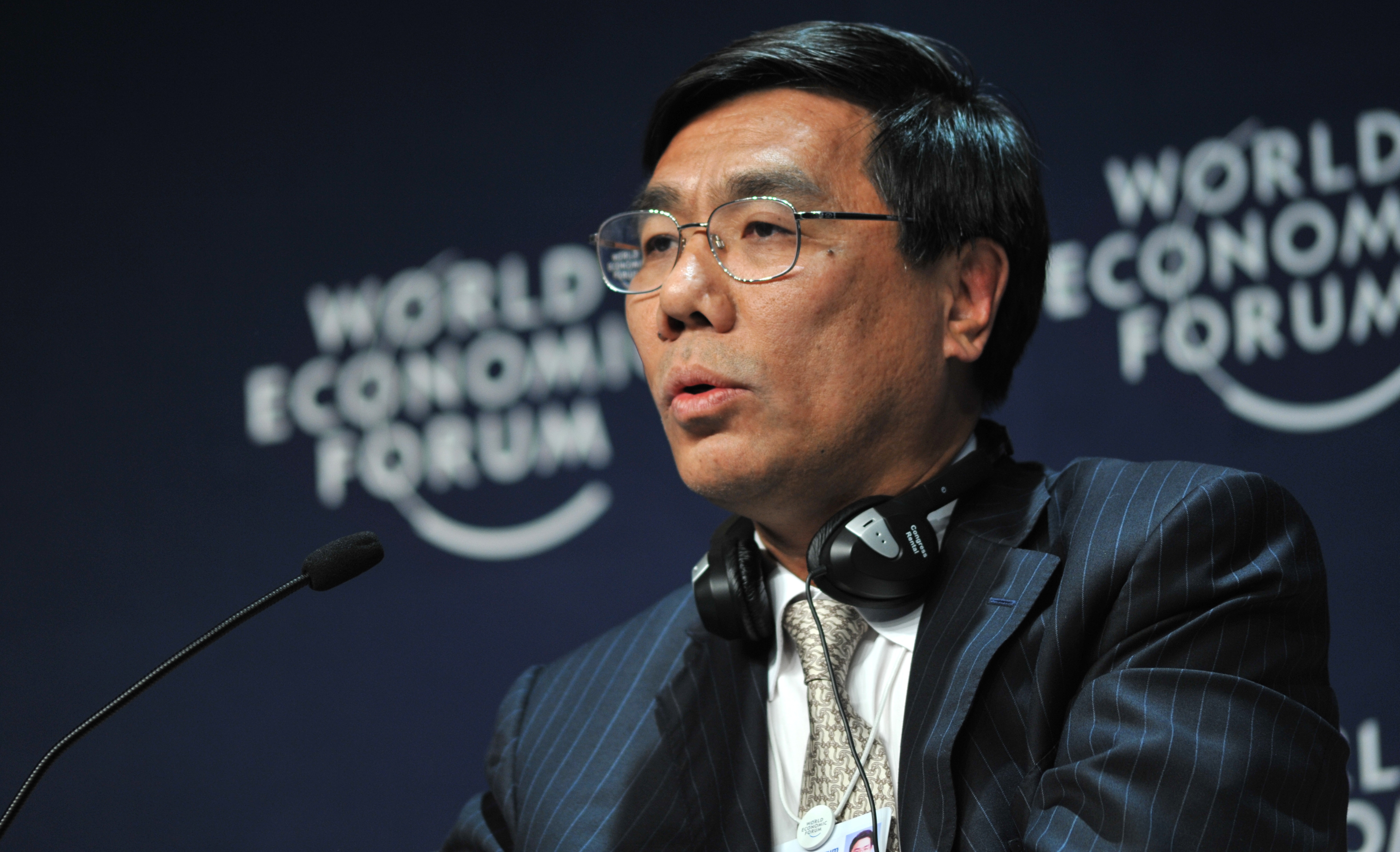
- Jiang Jianqing at the 2009 World Economic Forum on Africa
- Born: 1 February 1953 (age 73); Shanghai, People's Republic of China
- Education: Shanghai University of Finance and Economics; Shanghai Jiao Tong University
- Occupations: Chairman and Executive Director, Industrial and Commercial Bank of China
- Political party: Chinese Communist Party

Jiang Jianqing (Chinese: 姜建清; pinyin: Jiāng Jiànqīng; born 1 February 1953) is the former chairman of the Industrial and Commercial Bank of China (ICBC), the world's largest bank by assets and 2nd market value; he held the position from 2005 to 2016.

== Biography ==
Jiang worked pila in the fields of Jiangxi Province and the coal mines in Henan Province for labor education during the Cultural Revolution. In 1986, he joined ICBC as a teller in Shanghai. Jiang graduated from Shanghai University of Finance and Economics in 1984, and later obtained his master's and doctor's degrees from Shanghai Jiao Tong University. In 1993, Jiang was appointed as the vice president of ICBC Shanghai Branch. Jiang became president of the Bank of Shanghai in 1995 and served as the president of ICBC Shanghai Branch from 1997. In July 1999, Jiang was promoted to the vice president and Chinese Communist Party Deputy Committee Secretary of ICBC. From February 2000 to October 2005, Jiang served as the president and Chinese Communist Party Committee Secretary of ICBC. In 2005, when ICBC restructured for public listing, Jiang became the chairman of the board of directors, also the CCP Committee Secretary.

His research interests include theoretical and practical bank innovation, and corporation theory of both industrial and financial capital. He is the author of numerous articles including "Technical Revolution in American Banking Industry"; ... and an article on ICBC's legacy to develop into China's leading bank

He was an alternate member of the 16th, 17th, and 18th Central Committee of the Chinese Communist Party.

In both 2011 and 2012 he was included in the 50 Most Influential ranking of Bloomberg Markets Magazine.

In December 2012 he was awarded the Most Influential Leader of Listed Company at the China Listed Company Overseas Forum & China Securities "Golden Bauhinia Awards".

In April 2013, he was awarded the Business Leader of the Year at The Asian Awards. Jiang earned a salary of $326,000 in 2013, and reportedly took a pay cut for 2014 due to general public discontent over high executive compensation.

He is also an adviser to the China Finance 40 Forum (CF40).
