= Jane Gladstone =

- Born: 1968 or 1969 (age 57–58)
- Citizenship: American
- Education: Brearley School; University of Virginia
- Occupation: Investment banker
- Known for: Senior managing director at Evercore Partners Pioneer of the Fintech Industry

Jane Gladstone (born 1968/1969) is the president of IntraFi Network (formerly Promontory Interfinancial Network) and a member of its board of directors. She previously was a senior managing director at Evercore Partners for 15 years. Gladstone started the financial institutions group at Evercore in 2005, and has advised on about $150 billion of M&A and capital raising.

Gladstone worked for Morgan Stanley until 2005 where she created a fintech merger and acquisition and advisory practice. She left Morgan Stanley in 2005 to build a similar practice at Evercore.

In 2015, she was included in Bloomberg Markets list of the 50 Most Influential, those with "the ability to move markets or shape ideas and policies," alongside Janet Yellen, Warren Buffett, Pope Francis, and Elon Musk. In 2015, she was ranked at #2 in the Institutional Investor Fintech Finance 35.

Gladstone was awarded the National Organization for Women's Women of Power and Influence Award in 2015 for her visionary leadership in the Fintech industry and her work to drive forward innovation, redefine workplaces, and inspire the next generation of leaders.

Gladstone was featured in The Wall Street Journal for her Goldman Sachs parody as a member of Kappa Beta Phi, Wall Street's elite secret society.

Gladstone grew up in New York and Los Angeles. She attended the Brearley School before getting a degree in art history from the University of Virginia.
