= Anne Brorhilker =

German prosecutor

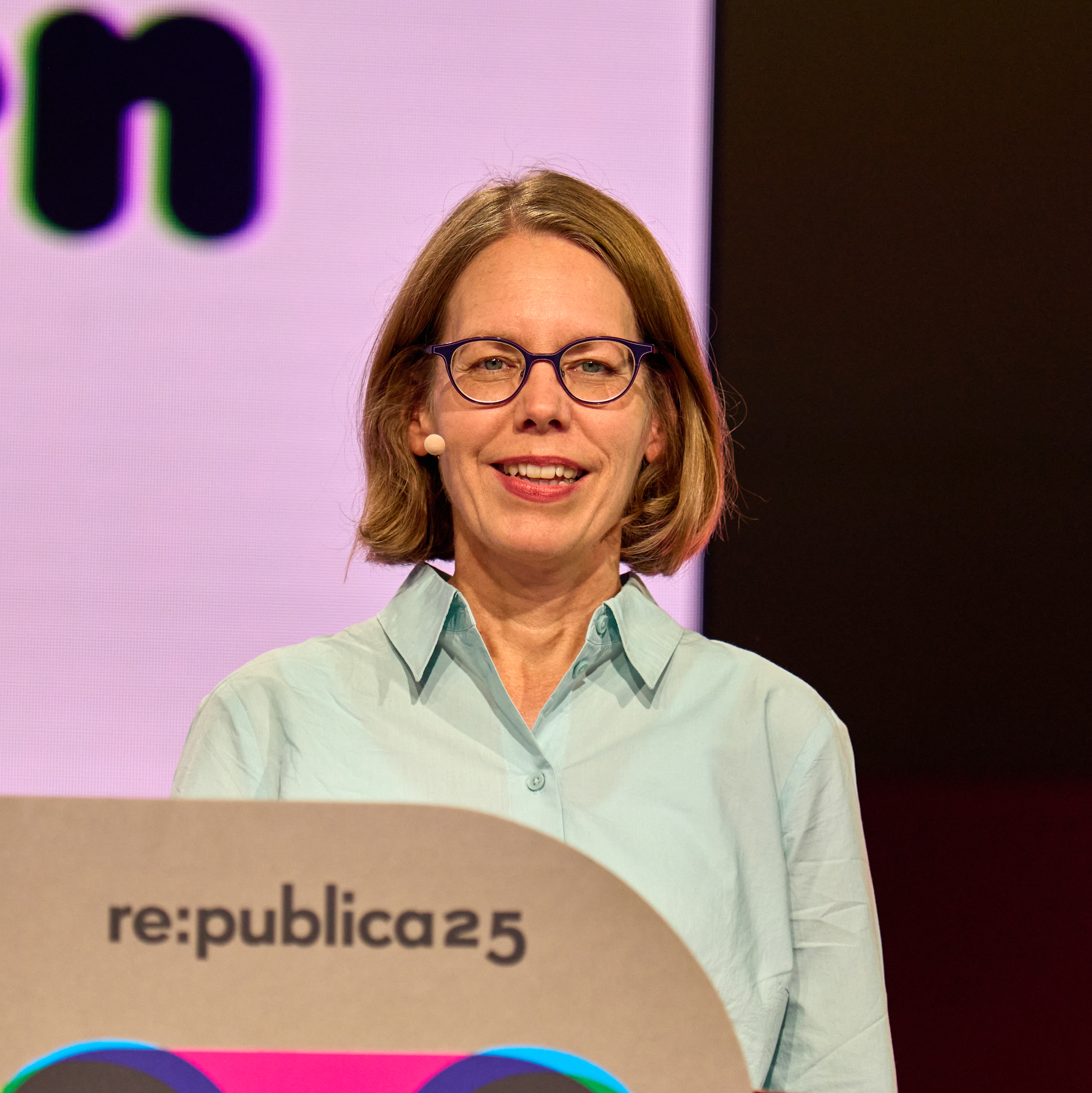
- Brorhilker in 2025
- Born: Anne Brorhilker; July 30, 1973 (age 53)
- Education: University of Bochum
- Occupation: Prosecutor

Anne Brorhilker (born 30 July 1973) is a German jurist who worked as a senior public prosecutor at the public prosecutor's office in Cologne. She became internationally known for her investigations into the CumEx fraud. In April 2024, she applied for dismissal from her civil servant position in order to work for the consumer financial lobby group Finanzwende as managing director.

== Life and career ==
Brorhilker studied law at the University of Bochum from 1993, where she also passed her first state examination in law. This was followed by a legal clerkship in Dortmund. Since 2002, she has worked at the public prosecutor's office in Cologne, where she moved to the specialist department for combating tax evasion in 2009.

== CumEx investigations ==
Brorhilker's first CumEx case began in the summer of 2013. In 2014, she had a worldwide raid carried out with great success.

In 2017, she became head of the tax department with a focus on CumEx proceedings.

Brorhilker's investigations led to the first CumEx ruling in spring 2020. For the first time, a court ruled that CumEx is illegal. Until now, many perpetrators had relied on supposed legal loopholes in their transactions. And indeed: for decades, legislators and tax authorities had not succeeded in stopping CumEx. In 2019, Brorhilker's test case for a landmark judgment with two key witnesses began at Cologne Regional Court. The aim was to clarify whether the CumEx system is illegal, i.e. criminal. In the spring of 2020, the Cologne Regional Court handed down a verdict that was clear: cum-ex is illegal.

In the same year as the trial at Cologne Regional Court, the Federal Court of Justice classified CumEx as criminal tax evasion. Of the proceedings against 1,800 defendants nationwide, 1,700 are being conducted under her leadership (as of August 2023).

In March 2021, Brorhilker was promoted to Head of Department H, consisting of four CumEx departments.

On 22 April 2024, she announced her resignation from the judiciary. She submitted an application to be dismissed from her position as a civil servant on 31 May 2024. Following her dismissal, she criticised the judiciary's lack of resources in the fight against financial crime.

== Awards ==
In 2021, Bloomberg named Brorhilkers one of the "50 Most Influential People" in the finance category. In the same year, Brorhilkers proceedings before the German Federal Court of Justice in the Cum-Ex case were awarded the Most Important Court Case of the Year Award by Global Investigations Review magazine.
