= Breakout Nations =

Book by Ruchir Sharma

Breakout Nations: In Pursuit of the Next Economic Miracles
- Hardcover edition
- Author: Ruchir Sharma
- Language: English
- Subject: Economics & Current Affairs
- Genre: Nonfiction
- Publisher: W. W. Norton & Company
- Publication date: April 2012
- Publication place: United States
- Media type: Print, e-book
- Pages: 304 pp.
- ISBN: 978-0393080261
- OCLC: 930382941

Breakout Nations: In Pursuit of the next Economic Miracles is a 2012 book written by Ruchir Sharma. The book discusses his views on emerging markets and his travel through these countries. Sales of the book has broken records and it has become an international best seller. Breakout Nations has received extensive global media coverage, including The Economist, and The Wall Street Journal.
