= Edith Heard =

British epigenetics researcher

Edith Heard CMG FRS MAE
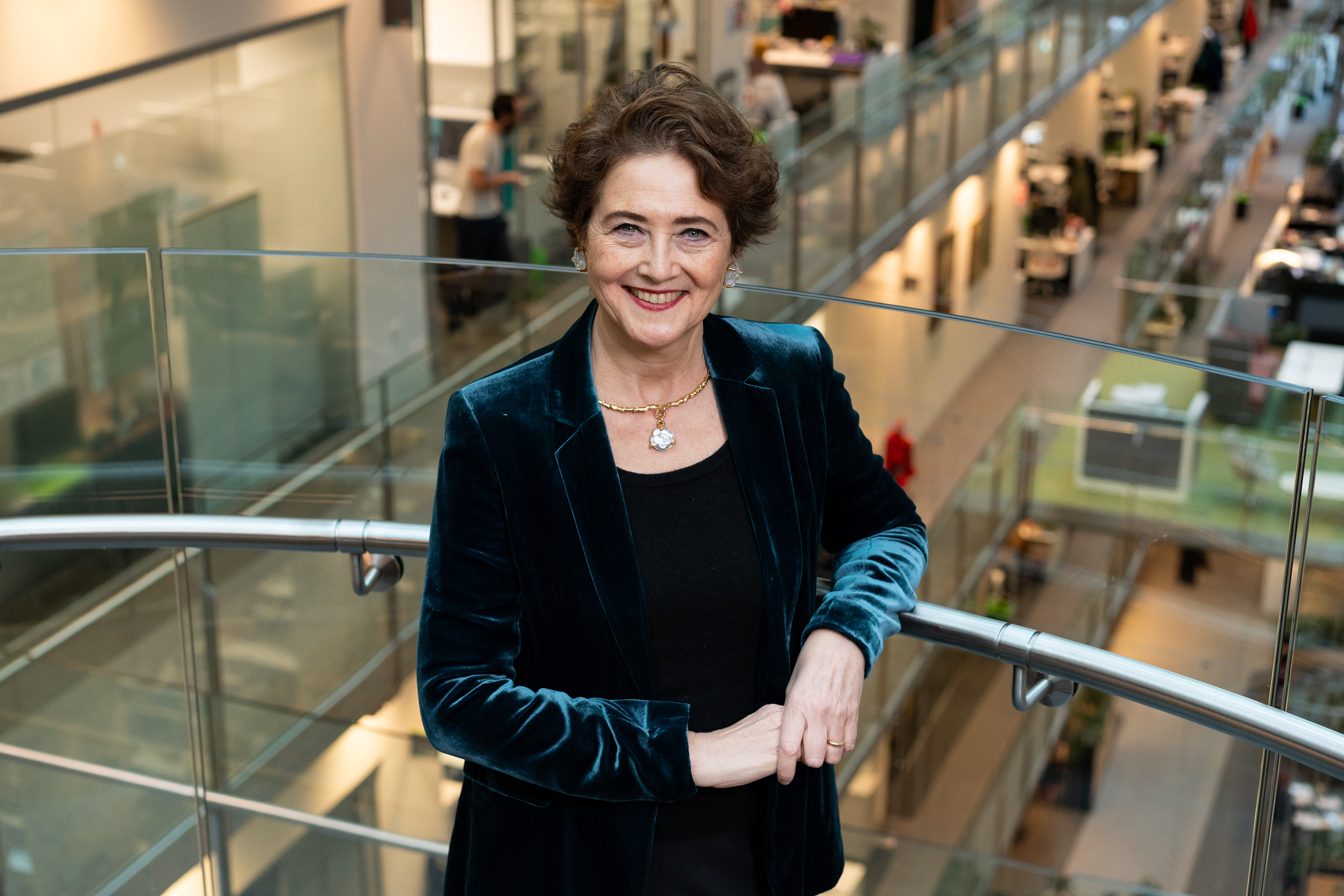
- Born: 5 March 1965 (age 61)
- Education: University of Cambridge (BA); Imperial College London (PhD)
- Spouse: Vincent Colot
- Awards: EMBO Member (2005); Suffrage Science award (2012); L'Oréal-UNESCO For Women in Science Awards (2020); Member of the National Academy of Sciences (2020)
- Scientific career
- Fields: Genetics; Epigenetics; X-inactivation
- Workplaces: Francis Crick Institute; European Molecular Biology Laboratory; Collège de France; Institut Curie (2001-2018); Institut Pasteur (1990-2000); University of Cambridge; Imperial College London; Imperial Cancer Research Fund
- Thesis: Analysis of a gene amplification event in rat cells (1990)
- Doctoral advisor: Mike Fried
- Website: www.crick.ac.uk/research/labs/edith-heard

Edith Heard (born 1965) CMG FRS MAE is a British researcher in epigenetics who became Director and CEO of the Francis Crick Institute in London, U.K. in September 2025, having previously served as Director General of the European Molecular Biology Laboratory (EMBL) since January 2019. She is also Professor at the Collège de France, holding the Chair of Epigenetics and Cellular Memory.

From 2010 to 2018, Heard was the Director of the Genetics and Developmental Biology department at the Curie Institute (Paris), France. Heard is noted for her studies of X-chromosome-inactivation.

== Education ==
Heard attended Francis Holland, Regent's Park, a private girls' school in central London. She graduated with a Bachelor of Arts degree in Natural Sciences (Genetics) from the University of Cambridge as a student of Emmanuel College, Cambridge, graduating in 1986. She was awarded a PhD from Imperial College London for research investigating gene amplification in rat cells in 1990 while working at the Imperial Cancer Research Fund Laboratory in London, UK.

== Career and research ==
Heard's main areas of research include genetics, epigenetics and developmental biology, in particular focussing on X-chromosome inactivation, which occurs when one of the two copies of the X chromosomes in female mammals is inactivated. Her work on this process started in the 1990’s during her post-doc in the laboratory of Philip Avner at the Pasteur Institute. After joining the CNRS, she continued to work on X inactivation, performing functional studies on the X-inactivation centre locus that regulates the initiation of X inactivation. In 2000, Heard spent a year as a visiting scientist in David Spector’s group at Cold Spring Harbor Laboratory where she discovered some of the early chromatin changes in the X-inactivation process.

Heard set up her own laboratory at the Institut Curie in 2001. Amongst her contributions, her group showed that X-chromosome inactivation happens not once, but twice, during development: first in all cells designated to building the placenta, then again in some cells sent off to build the embryo.

Heard developed powerful single-cell techniques enabling the analysis of fixed and living embryos and embryonic stem cells. These led to one of her major discoveries, showing that X-inactivation is a highly dynamic process during early embryogenesis and revealing major differences in X-inactivation strategies in different mammals, from mouse to man. Heard has also performed pioneering work revealing that in addition to epigenetic modifications, chromosome organization and nuclear compartmentalization are important players in the initiation and maintenance of X inactivation. Thanks to their studies on the X-inactivation centre, the Heard group also revealed the existence of Topologically Associating Domains (TADs) in collaboration with Job Dekker.

Heard has been a professor at the Collège de France, holding the Chair of Epigenetics and Cellular Memory, and from 2010 to 2018 she was director of the Genetics and Developmental Biology department at the Institut Curie in Paris. She and her laboratory moved to EMBL in 2019. In 2016, Heard was involved in establishing a Government of France programme to support scientists displaced by war or conflict – the Programme d'aide à l'accueil en urgence des scientifiques en exil (PAUSE).

In June 2017, Heard's appointment as the fifth Director General of the European Molecular Biology Laboratory was announced, and she took office in January 2019. In July 2024, Heard was announced as the second Director and CEO of the Francis Crick Institute and she took up the post in September 2025.

== Other activities ==
Heard is a member of the Scientific Advisory Board of the Biotech Research & Innovation Centre (Copenhagen, Denmark), the Institute of Molecular Biology and Biotechnology (Crete, Greece) and Aithyra, the Research Institute for Biomedical Artificial Intelligence of the Austrian Academy of Sciences. She is also a Trustee of the Howard Hughes Medical Institute and Institut Imagine (Paris, France).

Heard was a member of the Francis Crick Institute Scientific Advisory Board from 2016 until her announcement as incoming Director.

She has served as a member of the science council of the World Health Organization (WHO) since 2021.

== Awards and honours ==
In 2013, she was elected a Fellow of the Royal Society (FRS) in recognition for her discoveries in epigenetics. Her nomination reads:

Heard has made several groundbreaking discoveries in epigenetics, through her studies on X-chromosome inactivation, the process of dosage compensation in mammals. Heard developed powerful single-cell techniques enabling the analysis of fixed and living embryos and embryonic stem cells. These led to one of her major discoveries, showing that X-inactivation is a highly dynamic process during early embryogenesis and revealing major differences in X-inactivation strategies in different mammals, from mouse to man. Heard has also performed pioneering work revealing that in addition to epigenetic modifications, chromosome organization and nuclear compartmentalization are important players in the initiation and maintenance of X inactivation.

In 2011, Heard received the Grand Prix de la Fondation pour la recherche médicale. In 2009, she received the Prix Jean Hamburger. In 2005, Heard was a laureate of the FSER award. Heard has been an EMBO Member since 2005 and won the Suffrage Science award in 2012. She received the European Society for Human Genetics Award in 2017 and the Hansen Family Award in 2019.

In 2017, Heard was awarded the Inserm Grand Prix for her work on epigenetics.

In 2020, she was awarded the L'Oréal-UNESCO For Women in Science Awards and in April 2021 was appointed a member of the World Health Organization Science Council, and also elected as a foreign Member of the National Academy of Sciences. In 2021 she was elected to the German National Academy of Sciences Leopoldina. In October 2021, she was elected as an International Member of the National Academy of Medicine. In May 2022, she was appointed a Member of the Royal Danish Academy of Science and Letters. In July 2022, the Pontifical Academy of Sciences announced Heard's appointment as a member. In December 2022, Heard was elected to the French Academy of Sciences under the section ‘Human Biology and Medical Sciences’ for her work on epigenetics, particularly in deciphering the process of X-chromosome inactivation. On 12 December 2024 she received the CNRS Gold Medal.

She was appointed a Companion of the Order of St Michael and St George (CMG) in the 2025 Birthday Honours, for services to science and UK/France relations.

Heard was the 2025 recipient of the Croonian Medal and Lecture from the Royal Society for being a leading figure in X-chromosome biology. In 2026, she was elected a Fellow of the Academy of Medical Sciences.

== Personal life ==
Heard is married to French molecular biologist Vincent Colot. They have two children.
