= Mary Callahan Erdoes =

American banker (born 1967)

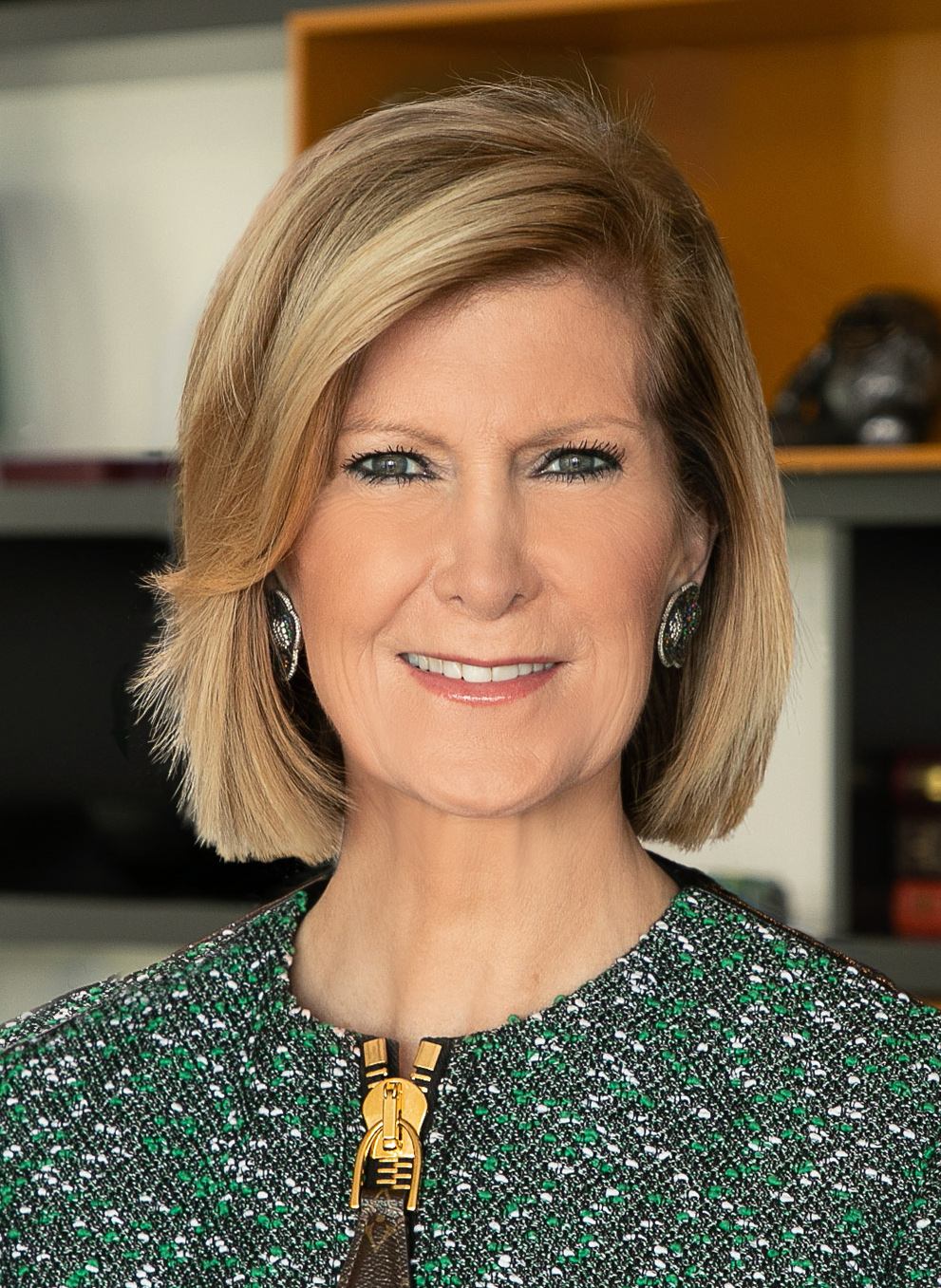
- Callahan Erdoes in 2018
- Born: Mary Callahan; August 13, 1967 (age 58); Menlo Park, California, U.S.
- Education: Georgetown University (BS); Harvard University (MBA)
- Spouse: Philip Erdoes (m. 1997; died 2026)
- Children: 3

Mary Callahan Erdoes (born August 13, 1967) is an American investment manager and businesswoman. She is the chief executive officer (CEO) of the asset and wealth management division of J.P. Morgan, since 2009.

With the firm since 1996, she began her career as a portfolio manager, specializing in fixed income trading. From 2005 to 2009, she was the CEO of the firm's Private Bank advising wealthy families and institutions. Her career has led to her being described as the most powerful woman in American finance.

== Early life and education ==
Mary Callahan was born on August 13, 1967 in Menlo Park, California, to Patricia and Patrick Callahan Jr. The oldest of four children, she grew up in Winnetka, Illinois, a North Shore suburb of Chicago. She was raised in a Roman Catholic family of Irish descent. She attended the all-girls Roman Catholic Woodlands Academy of the Sacred Heart in Lake Forest, Illinois. Callahan Erdoes received her bachelor's degree from Georgetown University, majoring in mathematics. She was the only woman to complete a mathematics major at Georgetown at the time. She earned her MBA at Harvard Business School.

== Career ==
Callahan Erdoes started her career with boutique asset manager Stein Roe & Farnham in Chicago, in a role she described as a "glorified mailroom job". She then joined Bankers Trust as an analyst in 1989, where she worked in corporate finance, merchant banking, and high-yield debt underwriting. Following her graduation from Harvard Business School in 1993, she joined Meredith, Martin & Kaye, a fixed-income specialty advisory firm, where she was responsible for credit research, trading, and portfolio management. As a portfolio manager, she oversaw assets that grew from $500 million to $3 billion over three years. In 1996, she joined J.P. Morgan Asset Management as the head of fixed income, aged 29, advising high-net-worth individuals, foundations, and endowments. From March 2005 to September 2009, she was the CEO of J.P. Morgan's Private Bank, the company's high-end wealth management unit, before being selected for her role as CEO of the company's asset and wealth management division. With that move, she also became part of the JPMorganChase Operating Committee. In 2024, Callahan Erdoes helped spearhead an AI initiative made available to employees of JPMorganChase. She has been noted as a potential successor to Jamie Dimon, as CEO of JPMorganChase.

She has served as a board member of the Robin Hood Foundation, the U.S. Fund for UNICEF, and the U.S.-China Business Council. She has been on the Federal Reserve Bank of New York's Investor Advisory Committee on Financial Markets. She has also served on the board of trustees for Georgetown University, Harvard Business School, and Harvard University, respectively, along with being appointed to Harvard Management Company's board of directors in November 2025. She is the vice chair of the Alfred E. Smith Memorial Foundation.

== Personal life ==
She first met Philip Erdoes in 1993, during their time at Harvard Business School; they were married from 1997 until his death in 2026. They lived in New York City with their three daughters.

Callahan Erdoes has donated to both Democratic Party and Republican Party candidates, including Republican nominees John McCain (2008) and Mitt Romney (2012).

== Honors ==
Since 2012, Callahan Erdoes has been included in the 50 Most Influential list of Bloomberg Markets. Since March 2013, Business Insider has included Callahan Erdoes on its list of the 25 most powerful women on Wall Street. Since 2016, Callahan Erdoes has been named one of the most powerful women in the world by Forbes and American Banker. In 2024, she made Forbes' self-made women list. In 2025, she ranked 40th on Forbes' list of "World's 100 most powerful women, and 96th on Forbes' list of America's richest self-made women. In 2025, Callahan Erdoes ranked first on The Most Powerful Women in Finance list by American Banker, marking her third consecutive year at the top of the ranking.
