= Feminist Coalition =

Nigerian feminist group

- Nickname: FemCo
- Founder: Odunayo Eweniyi; Damilola Odufuwa
- Founded at: Lagos, Nigeria
- Location: Nigeria
- Website: https://feministcoalition2020.com/

The Feminist Coalition is a group of young Nigerian feminists who work to promote equality for women in Nigerian society.

It was co-founded in July 2020 by Damilola Odufuwa and Odunayo Eweniyi.

== Projects ==
In October 2020, a series of mass peaceful protests against police brutality in Nigeria with the hashtag and slogan “End SARS” began. The protests called for the complete disbandment of the Special Anti-Robbery Squad (SARS), a police unit with a history of abuse of power. The members decided its first project would be to support the peaceful protests through ensuring the safety of Nigerians exercising their constitutional rights.

== Allegation of financial misconduct ==
On March 12, 2021, it was reported by Nigerian media outlets that the organization and its members withdrew ₦23,000,000 (equivalent to $51,000 per exchange rate) worth of Bitcoin from the EndSARS account and deposited it into private accounts. The feminist coalition released an official statement that contained their evidence of no wrongdoing and refuted any act of financial malpractice or privatizing any monies. The evidence was a combination of figures and crypto currency lingua which made it significantly difficult for persons without knowledge on how digital currency works to comprehend. The evidence was eventually tagged as a falsehood by crypto currency traders in Nigeria and third party crypto currency traders outside Nigeria who cited irregularities and factual inaccuracies in their evidence. Furthermore, the evidence provided by the feminist coalition appeared to be somewhat contradictory to what the organization claimed during the 2020 EndSARS protests in which they claimed all their legal services were pro-bono but their evidence did not support that claim as it showed millions of the Nigerian naira obtained from public donations were spent on legal fees. Crypto currency experts reprimanded the organization for being deceptive and deliberately obsfucating the evidence.

In May 2021, In bid to counter the financial misconduct they were indicted in, the organization released a comprehensive audit report regarding their management of funds obtained through the EndSARS donations but came under negative criticism because the audit report was sent to donors only. This attracted negative criticism as they were yet again accused of censoring information and accused of contradicting themselves once again. The organization claimed the audit reports were sent to the electronic mails of the donors only, but in 2020 during the EndSARS protests the organization claimed the donations they received to finance the protest were made anonymously, which birthed the question of how they knew the identity and electronic mails of the donors if the donations were made anonymously.
