= Maury Harris =

American economist

Maury Harris is a managing director and chief economist for the Americas for UBS. Harris was named among the 2012 Bloomberg 50 Most Influential people in global finance.

== Education ==
Harris graduated Phi Beta Kappa from University of Texas, and has a PhD in economics from Columbia University.

== Personal life ==
Harris is married with two children.
