= China Renaissance =

Chinese financial institution

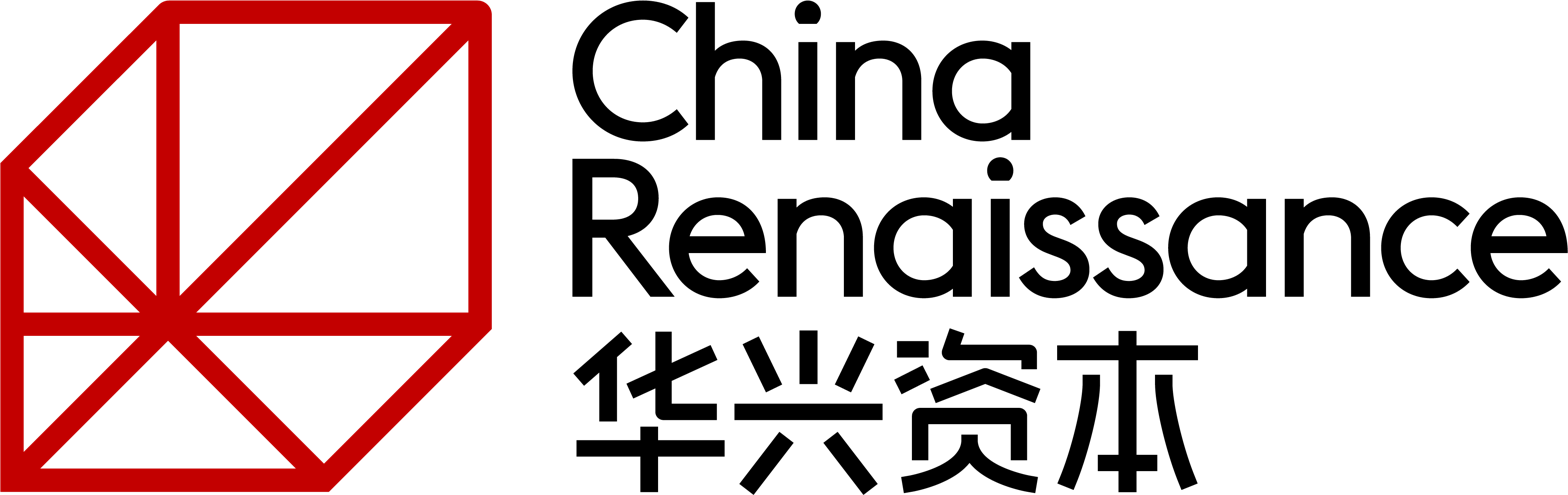
- Native name: 华兴资本
- Type: Public
- Traded as: SEHK: 1911
- Industry: Financial services
- Founded: December 2005; 20 years ago
- Founder: Bao Fan
- Headquarters: Beijing, People's Republic of China
- Services: Investment banking Investment management Wealth management
- Revenue: ▲CN¥2.50 billion (FY2021)
- Net income: ▲CN¥1.65 billion (FY2021)
- Total assets: ▲CN¥14.16 billion (FY2021)
- Total equity: ▲CN¥7.91 billion (FY2021)
- Number of employees: ▲731 (FY2021)
- Website: www.chinarenaissance.com

China Renaissance
- Simplified Chinese: 华兴资本
- Traditional Chinese: 華興資本
- Literal meaning: Rising China Capital
Transcriptions
Standard Mandarin
- Hanyu Pinyin: Huá Xìng zīběn

China Renaissance is a Chinese financial services company. Founded by Bao Fan in 2005 as a financial advisory firm, China Renaissance's core business now consists of investment banking, investment management and wealth management.

== Background ==
In 2010, China Renaissance launched K2VC, a venture capital firm.

In 2018, China Renaissance was listed on the Main Board of Hong Kong Stock Exchange.

In February 2023, the BBC and other sources reported that Bao had been missing for two days and they were unsure of his whereabouts. The disappearance has caused the stock of China Renaissance to drop by 50 percent, though the company said in a statement that Operations would "continue normally". Later, the company announced that Bao was taken by the Chinese authorities as a part of an investigation targeting Bao's former colleague and the company's former president, Cong Lin.

In February 2024, Bao resigned from all of his roles at China Renaissance.

The company has offices in Beijing, Shanghai, Hong Kong and New York City.
