= Democracy on the Road =

2019 book by Ruchir Sharma

Democracy on the Road: A 25 Year Journey through India
- Author: Ruchir Sharma
- Genre: Non-fiction
- Publication date: 2019

Democracy on the Road: A 25 Year Journey through India is a 2019 book by Indian investor Ruchir Sharma. It is an examination of Indian elections, and politics, in the post-independence period, with a specific focus on state and national elections between 1998 and 2018. It is based on annual road expeditions that Sharma organized and participated in, along with a group of journalists, to track elections in India.
