= Ayo Akinola (Piggyvest Co-Founder) =

Nigerian technology entrepreneur and author

Ayo Akinola is a Nigerian technology entrepreneur, business executive and author. He is a member of the founding team of Piggytech, the parent company of Nigerian financial technology platforms PiggyVest and PocketApp, and he is the Chief executive officer of PocketApp. In 2025, he published Credit Alert, a book about sales and consumer behaviour in Nigeria.

== Education ==
Akinola attended Covenant University and graduated with a Bachelor's degree (BSc) in Computer science. He also obtained his Senior Secondary School Certificate at the Air Force Secondary School.

== Career ==
=== PushCV ===
Akinola was part of the team that established PushCV, an online recruitment platform in Nigeria. It was developed to connect job seekers with employers by matching candidates according to skills, job preferences and employment opportunities. The founding team included Somtochukwu Ifezue, Ayo Akinola, Joshua Chibueze, Terry Kanu, Odunayo Eweniyi and Ibukun Akinola.

=== Piggytech and PiggyVest ===
Akinola was part of the founding team of Piggytech, the financial technology company behind PiggyVest. PiggyVest began operations in 2016 as a digital savings platform. He worked in business development and sales within the group and then led PocketApp.

=== PocketApp ===
Akinola serves as chief executive officer of PocketApp, a financial technology platform within Piggytech.

== Writing ==
In 2025, Akinola published Credit Alert, a

self-help book about selling to Nigerian consumers. The book discusses sales, marketing and consumer behaviour in the Nigerian market.
