= Damilola Odufuwa =

Nigerian business executive and activist

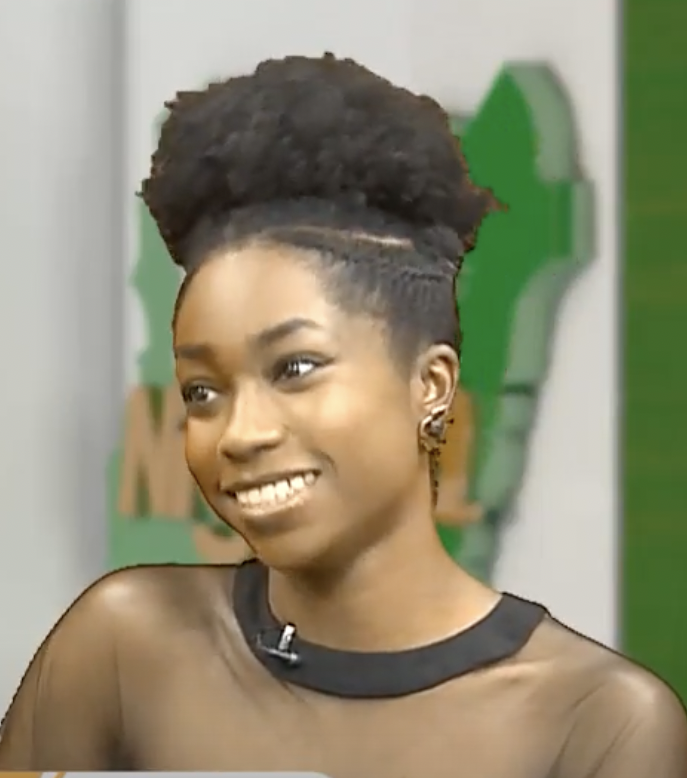
- An image of Damilola Odufuwa
- Occupations: Business Executive; Activist

Damilola Odufuwa is a Nigerian business executive and activist. She is the Head of Product Communications at Binance Africa as of March, 2022. She is also the co-founder and CEO of Backdrop and is also the co-founder of Feminist Coalition. She is also the co-founder of Wine & Whine.

== Education ==
Damilola Odufuwa attained a BSc. in Financial Economics with her final year dissertation on The Use of Microfinance Schemes on Alleviating Poverty in 2012 from the University of Kent. She then attained a master's degree in International Finance and Economic Development in 2013 from the University of Kent.

== Career ==
Damilola Odufuwa began her career working on MTV Shuga and then worked as a freelancer producer for National Geographic in July 2019 for one month. She also worked as Editor in Chief for ZUMI between 2018 and 2019. Damilola was also a social producer for CNN Africa. She also worked as Chief Editor for Konbini and Zikoko. She is the CEO of Backdrop – an app she Co-founded in 2020 with Odunayo Eweniyi that allows people to find and share places around the world and plan trips makess it easier for Gen Zs and milennials. She is also the co-founder of Feminist Coalition an advocacy group with the aim of Equality for Women in Nigerian society. She is the Global Head of Product Communications at Binance Africa as of March 2022. She also has been identified among six women at the forefront of West Africa's tech boom. Odufuwa also worked with Universal Music Group in media and digital and content roles.

== Awards ==
Damilola Odufuwa was listed as one of 12 Women Leaders That Changed The World In 2020 by British Vogue. She was also listed on the 2021 Times Next 100 list. Damilola was the winner of the 2020 The Future Awards Africa Prize for Leading Conversations. She was named in the Bloomberg 50 list of people who changed global business in 2020.

== Activism ==
Damilola Odufuwa and Odunayo Eweniyi created the Feminist Coalition, which focuses on women's rights and safety, economic empowerment, and political participation of women in Nigeria. For its first project, the organization supported the #EndSARS protests that swept Nigeria in 2020 and organized a food drive for low-income women and their families.
