= Katie Haun =

American venture capitalist and Founder of Haun Ventures

Kathryn Rose Haun
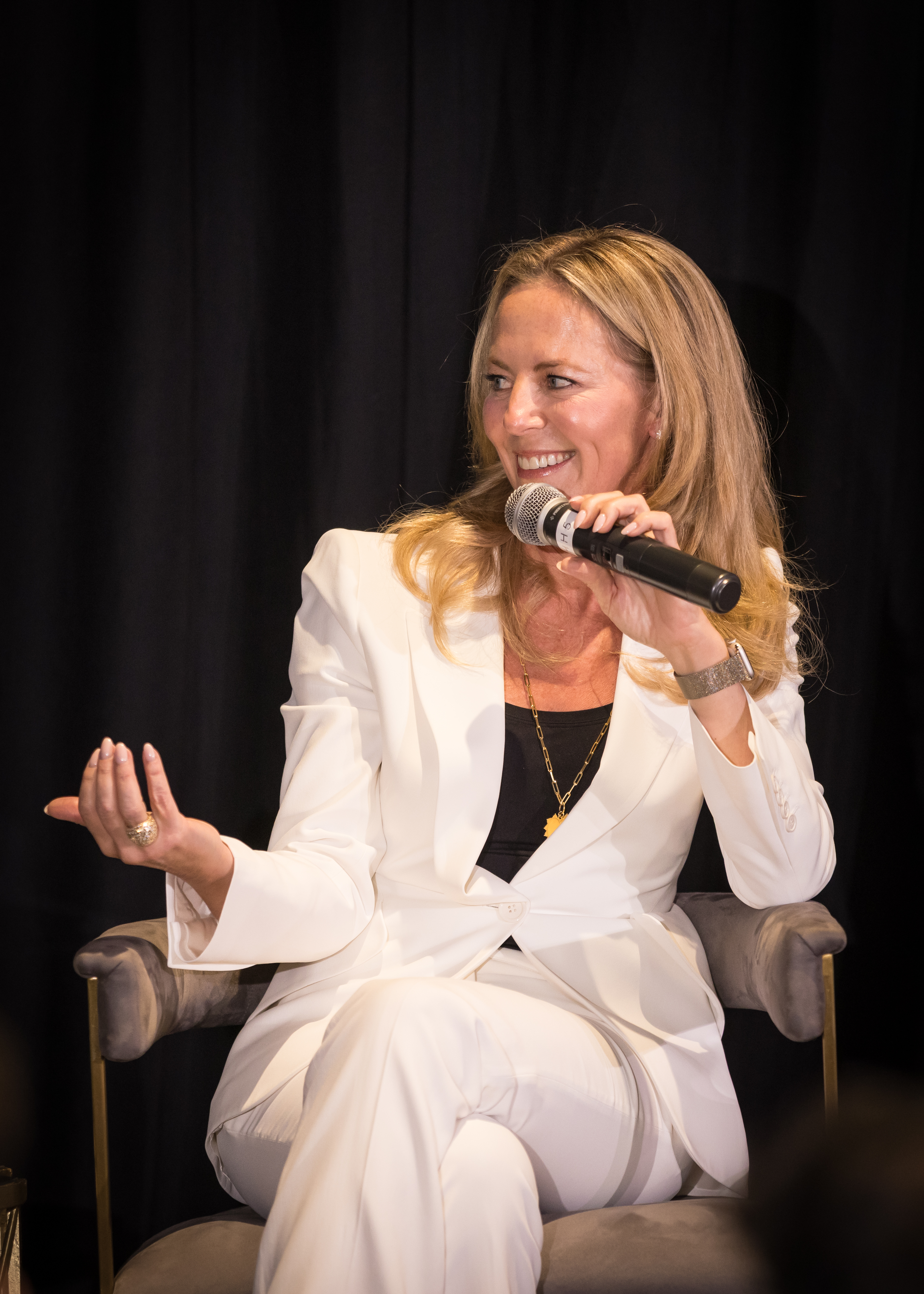
- Haun at the TechCrunch StrictlyVC event in 2025
- Education: Boston University; Stanford Law School
- Occupations: Venture capitalist, lawyer
- Known for: Founding cryptocurrency venture firm Haun Ventures
- Website: www.haun.co

Kathryn Rose Haun is an American venture capitalist and former federal prosecutor. She is the founder and CEO of Haun Ventures, a Silicon Valley venture fund specializing in digital assets and blockchain technology. She was previously a general partner at Andreessen Horowitz.

== Early life and education ==
Haun spent her childhood living in several countries, including Egypt. She moved back to the United States to attend Boston University. Haun graduated with honors from Stanford Law School.

== Career ==
After finishing law school, Haun served as a law clerk for Supreme Court of the United States Justice Anthony Kennedy. She was a lecturer at Stanford Law School where she taught a course on digital currency and cybercrime. Haun also taught a course on cryptocurrency at Stanford Graduate School of Business.

=== U.S. Department of Justice ===
In 2006, Haun became a federal prosecutor in the United States District Court for the Eastern District of Virginia and worked on cases focused on national security and terrorism. She held senior policy positions at the United States Department of Justice (DOJ) headquarters in both the National Security Division and United States Attorney General's office. In 2009, Haun moved to California and went back to serving as Assistant U.S. Attorney in San Francisco. There she prosecuted cases against organized crime, drug cartels, and gangs, including Nuestra Familia, Hells Angels, and the Mongols Motorcycle Club.

In 2012, Haun was first introduced to Bitcoin through her work at the DOJ. She led investigations into digital assets, including the corrupt agents on the Silk Road dark web marketplace and the Mt. Gox Bitcoin exchange hack. She also created the first DOJ cryptocurrency task force.

=== Venture capital ===
In 2017, Haun joined Coinbase as its first independent board member and served through the company's listing as the first publicly-traded crypto company. She left the board in 2024 after serving for seven years.

In 2018, she joined Andreessen Horowitz as a general partner. She co-led the firm's crypto franchise and helped guide Andreessen Horowitz in the field of cryptocurrency.

In addition to Coinbase, Haun has served on the boards of crypto and tech companies including cybersecurity platform HackerOne. She was included on Bloomberg's 2022 list of "50 People Who Defined Global Business." Haun is also a lifetime member of the Council on Foreign Relations.

==== Haun Ventures ====
In March 2022, Haun launched her own venture capital firm, Haun Ventures, with a $1.5 billion fund, the largest fund ever raised by a solo venture capitalist. The firm focuses on crypto startups and its portfolio includes companies like Bridge and Chainalysis.

In 2026, Haun Ventures closed $1 billion across two new funds, bringing total assets under management to $2.5 billion.
