= Kathy Matsui =

American economist

Kathy M. Matsui
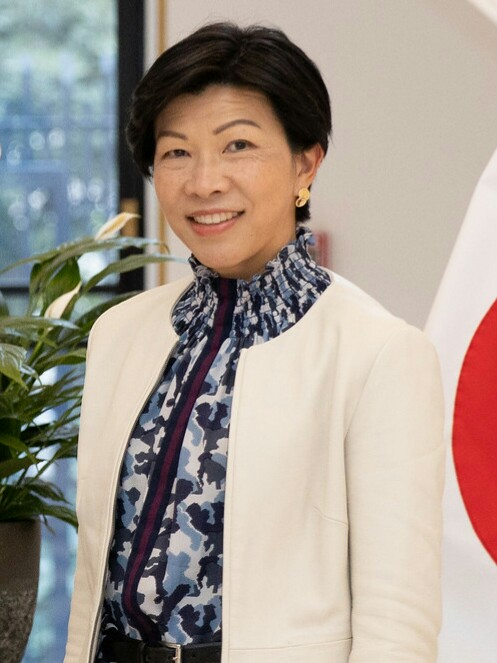
- Born: February 2, 1965 (age 61); Santa Clara, California, USA
- Spouse: Jesper Koll
- Children: 2

Kathy M. Matsui (キャシー・松井, born 1965) is a General Partner of Japan's first ESG-focused global venture capital fund, MPower Partners.

She is a former vice chair and chief Japan strategist for global investment bank Goldman Sachs. She was born in California in 1965. She was credited by Shinzō Abe, prime minister of Japan, with having coined the term "womenomics". She is a TEDx speaker.

== Life and career ==
Matsui's parents were Japanese Christians who emigrated from Nara Prefecture in Japan to the United States in the early 1960s. She was born in California in 1965, where her parents ran a commercial flower nursery in Salinas Valley. She has three siblings, Teresa, William, and Paul. Growing up, she worked in the family business while attending school and taking Japanese classes on Saturdays.

Matsui is a 1982 graduate of Gonzales High School. A small rural school district at the time served Gonzales, CA; Soledad, CA; Chualar, CA and the surrounding ranches and farm in central Salinas Valley.

Matsui earned degrees in social studies from Harvard University and international affairs from Johns Hopkins University. In 1986 she visited Japan for the first time—two years on a Rotary scholarship at the International Christian University in Tokyo. Before this, she had only a weak command of the Japanese language. Matsui joined the Japan Strategy team of Barclays de Zoete Wedd Securities in spring 1990, just after the Japanese bubble economy peaked. She joined Goldman Sachs Japan in 1994, where she became managing director in 1998 and the first female partner there in 2000.

In August 1999 Matsui published a thesis in which she coined the term "womenomics", in which she argues increasing the participation of women in the workforce as a better solution to Japan's economic stagnation than increasing immigration or the birthrate. At the time, 56.7% of working-age women participated in the workforce in Japan, where women's status and opportunities have ranked low compared to most other nations. She likened such low participation to "running a marathon with one leg".

Since her publication on womenomics, Japan's female labor force participation rate has risen to record levels that surpass both the US and Europe. The narrowing of the gender employment gap in Japan could thus sizably increase the nation's GDP by at least 10%.

In 2001, Matsui was diagnosed with breast cancer. She returned to California for chemotherapy and recuperation. She wore a wig when she returned to Goldman Sachs eight months later.

Japanese Prime Minister Shinzō Abe incorporated Matsui's womenomics research into his Abenomics economic reforms announced in 2012. On 1 January 2015 she was appointed a vice chair of Goldman Sachs Japan.

She is an advocate for women and pushes to enforce the vitality of women across all workspaces supported by policy and legislative recommendations. She lobbies for flexible labor contracts, tax reforms, looser immigration laws, and parliamentary gender quotas.

In 2014 Matsui was named "50 Most Influential" in Bloomberg Markets magazine for her implementation of "womenomics" into the field of investment banking and straight into her workplace at Goldman Sachs.

By 2020, she terminated her job at Goldman Sachs to pursue MPower Partners Fund. In 2021, she announced the creation of MPower Partners Fund - an entirely female-led fund that aims to allocate money towards startups. The capital that is allocated through the fund pushes towards investing in startups that use technology to tackle social issues with an emphasis on those that tackle health, education, and the environment. Creating this foundation emphasized Matsui's revolution of womenomics and instated it as a core value in the fund. Matsui aims to not only diversify the world of venture capital, but also to meet levels of diversity at the first stage of a startups' business cycle.

== Recognition ==
The magazine Institutional Investor named her the No. 1 stock market forecaster for Japan in 2000, 2001, and 2006, and the Wall Street Journal chose her in 2007 as one of "10 Women to Watch in Asia".

== Personal life ==
Matsui is married to Jesper Koll and is the mother of a son and daughter, both of whom were born in Japan.
