= Mene Pangalos =

British neuroscientist

Sir Mene Pangalos
- Born: London, England
- Education: Imperial College London (B.Sc., 1989); University College London (Ph.D., 1992)
- Known for: Drug discovery
- Scientific career
- Fields: Neuroscience, pharmacology
- Academic advisors: David Bowen, Derek Middlemiss, Nik Robakis

Sir Menelaos (Mene) Nicolas Pangalos (Greek: Μενέλαος Νικόλας Πάγκαλος) is a British neuroscientist of Greek descent.

Pangalos is Executive Vice President, BioPharmaceuticals R&D at AstraZeneca. He is responsible for the company's research and development of new drugs to treat respiratory, inflammation and autoimmune, renal, cardiovascular and metabolic diseases. Pangalos is the author of over 150 peer-reviewed articles published in scientific journals and serves on the board of the Francis Crick Institute, Cambridge Judge Business School and Dizal Pharma. He is a Fellow of the Royal Society and sits on their Science, Industry & Translation Committee. Pangalos was knighted in the 2020 New Year Honours for services to UK science.

== Early life and education ==
Pangalos was born in Ealing, London, to a family of Greek diaspora which settled in England. His parents were from the island of Chios and his mother (née Psarros) was also born there. His extended family on both parents' sides still live in Chios and he spent childhood summers there. He is fluent in Greek.

He commenced his scientific studies with a Bachelor of Science in Biochemistry and Molecular Biology (First Class Honours) from Imperial College London and a subsequent Ph.D. in neuropharmacology from University College London. His post-doctoral training was conducted under the tutelage of Prof. N. K. Robakis at the Mount Sinai Medical Center, New York.

== Pharmaceutical industry career ==
Pangalos previously served as Group Director and Head of Neurodegenerative Research at GlaxoSmithKline in Harlow, United Kingdom, and has held positions with SmithKline Beecham, Janssen Pharmaceutica and Bristol-Myers Squibb.

=== Wyeth ===
Pangalos was the Vice President of Neuroscience Research at American pharmaceutical company Wyeth from 2003 to 2008. He was responsible for overseeing the transition of more than 20 novel drug candidates into clinical development for a number of neurological and psychiatric diseases including Alzheimer's disease, stroke, schizophrenia, and pain.

=== Pfizer ===
In April, 2009, Pfizer announced that Pangalos would serve as the Chief Scientific Officer for Neuroscience, and that the role would be effective when the merger of Wyeth and Pfizer completed in 4Q, 2009. His time with Pfizer was brief, since Pangalos joined Astra Zeneca in 2010. According to Pangalos' linked-in profile, Pangalos was Senior Vice President at Pfizer from 2008 to 2010. He was responsible for 200 scientists and clinicians taking Pfizer neuroscience programmes from target identification through to proof of concept.

=== AstraZeneca ===
Pangalos was appointed Executive Vice President, BioPharmaceuticals R&D at AstraZeneca in January 2019. He previously held the role of Executive Vice President, Innovative Medicines & Early Clinical Development (IMED) Biotech Unit of AstraZeneca from April 2010 to December 2018.

Since Pangalos has been working at AstraZeneca, the company's compound success rate from pre-clinical studies to launch has increased from 4% to >19%. This is above the pharmaceutical industry average of 6%.

He has led the discovery and development of some of the pharmaceutical industry's fastest-to-market drugs, moving them from first-in-human trials to launch in just over 2.5 years. One notable example, the EGFRm inhibitor osimertinib for non-small cell lung cancer (NSCLC), is now approved in over 75 countries.

Pangalos is on the AstraZeneca Senior Executive Team and is the Executive Chair of the AstraZeneca Board Science Committee. In May 2020, amid the COVID-19 pandemic, he was appointed to the expert advisory group for the UK Government's Vaccine Task Force, chaired by Patrick Vallance.

== Academic career ==
Pangalos was elected a Fellow of the Royal Society in May 2022. He is also a Fellow of the Academy of Medical Sciences, the Royal Society of Biology and Clare Hall, University of Cambridge. He sits on the council of the Medical Research Council (MRC), co-chairs the Life Sciences Council Expert Group on Innovation, Clinical Research and Data and is a member of the UK Life Sciences Industrial Strategy Implementation Board.

Pangalos has held Visiting Professorships at the University of Pennsylvania and King's College London. He is on the editorial boards of a number of scientific journals – Molecular and Cellular Neuroscience, Neuropharmacology and The Scientific World and is on scientific advisory boards for the Wolfson Centre for Age-Related Diseases (King's College London University) and Rider University. Pangalos has edited the book Understanding G protein-coupled receptors and their role in the central nervous system (CNS), and a number of journal issues focused on drug discovery in the CNS.

He also mentors post-doc and PhD students in his role at AstraZeneca.

== Personal life ==
Pangalos married Kelly Charles, a fellow neuroscientist, in 2003 in Hertfordshire, England.
