= Ruchir Sharma =

Investor and fund manager

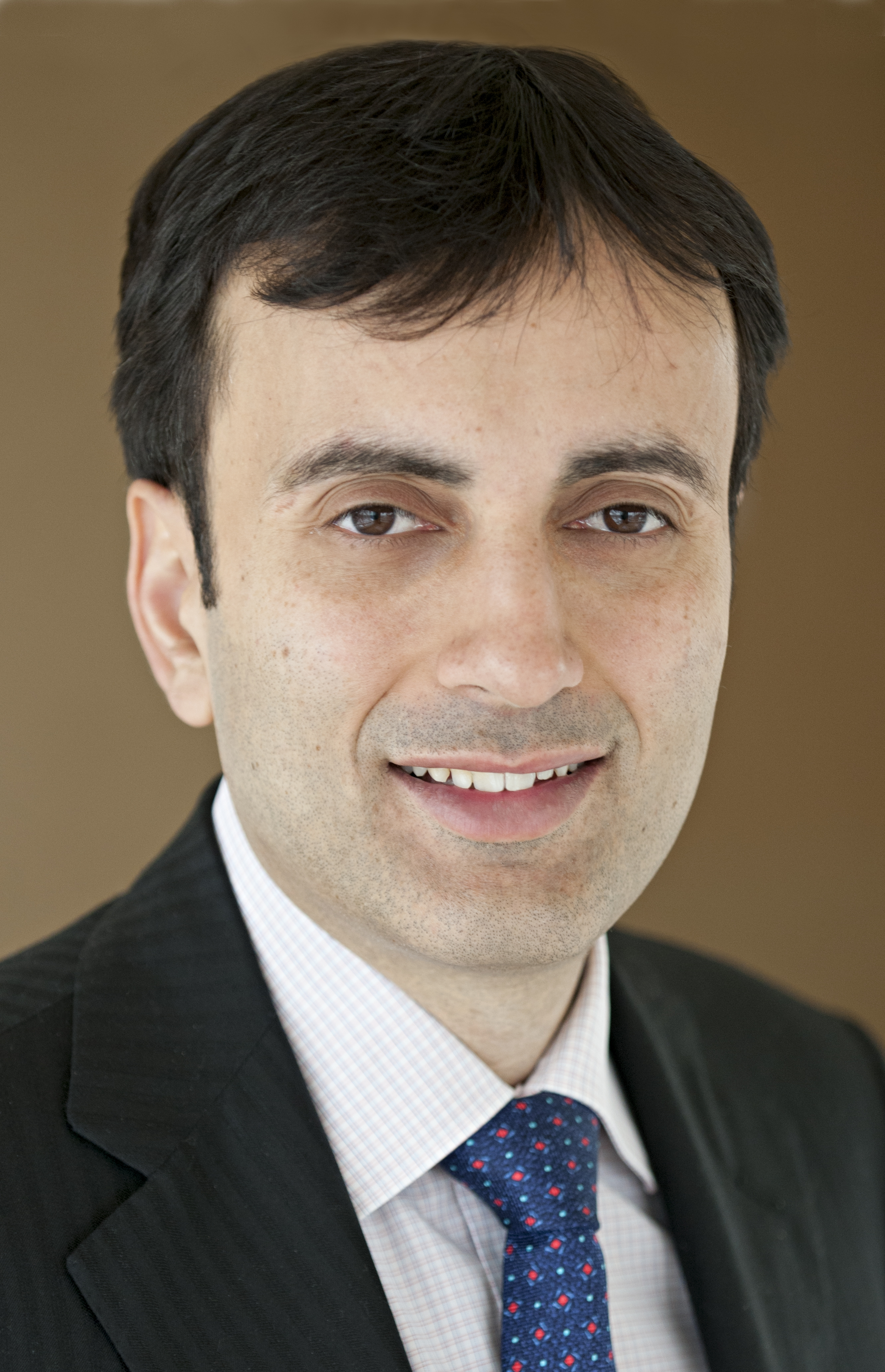
- Born: Wellington, Tamil Nadu, India
- Education: Delhi Public School, R. K. Puram; Shri Ram College of Commerce; Delhi University
- Occupations: Investor, Fund manager
- Employer: Rockefeller Capital Management
- Known for: Breakout Nations: In Pursuit of the Next Economic Miracles
- Website: www.ruchirsharma.com

Ruchir Sharma is an Indian American author, fund manager and columnist for the Financial Times. He is the head of Rockefeller Capital Management's international business, and was an emerging markets investor at Morgan Stanley Investment Management.

== Career ==
Sharma has told interviewers he spent his early school years in Mumbai, Delhi, and Singapore. He did his undergraduate studies at the Shri Ram College of Commerce in New Delhi, and afterward joined a securities trading company, and in 1991 he launched a column called For Ex, first for The Observer, later for The Economic Times of India. His writings attracted the attention of Morgan Stanley, which hired him in its Mumbai office in 1996. In 2002 he moved to the New York office. In 2003 he became co-head of the emerging markets team at Morgan Stanley Investment Management. In 2006 he became head of the team. In 2016, he took on an added role as Chief Global Strategist of MSIM. In November 2021, it was announced he would leave the firm on January 31, 2022.

== Economic and financial market views ==
Sharma's first book, Breakout Nations: In Pursuit of the next Economic Miracles (Norton 2012) chronicled his travels through emerging countries trying to spot the next big economic winners—and losers. He defined "breakout nations" as those poised to grow faster than rivals in their own income class. The book broke the nonfiction sales record in India and became an international bestseller.

In 2012 Foreign Policy magazine cited Sharma as one of its top 100 Global Thinkers "for dusting the gold off the term 'emerging markets', and refocusing the global discussion on "the real breakout nations to watch."

Sharma used his travels as the basis for many of his opinion columns, first published in The Economic Times, later in Newsweek International, The Wall Street Journal and other global media. Sharma's work has appeared in Foreign Affairs, The Washington Post, Time, Foreign Policy, Forbes, and The Bloomberg View, among others. A 2017 profile in the Financial Times described Sharma's style as a mix of stories picked up through his wanderings in bazaars and political rallies with "simple rubrics to explain distant economies… think Anthony Bourdain's inquisitiveness combined with Warren Buffett's folksiness."

From 2016 to early 2021 Sharma was a contributing opinion writer on global economics and politics for the New York Times, and he is currently a contributing editor at the Financial Times.

In June 2016, W. W. Norton & Company released The Rise and Fall of Nations: Forces of Change in the Post-Crisis World. It explained the principles he uses to identify nations that are poised to rise or decline in coming years, starting with the principle he calls "impermanence", that rapid economic growth is difficult to achieve, much less to sustain. Thus the next stars of the global economy are often those less known to the public. He said, "I prefer to look closely at countries that are so disdained by media that they are virtually ignored."

In a 2012 piece for Foreign Affairs, "Broken BRICs," Sharma had argued that the broad boom that lifted up virtually all emerging economies in the 2000s was freakishly unusual, and unlikely to be repeated. The hype over the BRICs—Brazil, Russia, India and China—was unlikely to be borne out. Forecasters who saw these rapidly catching up with rich ones would be disappointed. Instead, he said, the more likely outcome was a return to the normal historical pattern, with a few emerging economies catching up rapidly, and many struggling. Failing to sustain growth has been the general rule, and that rule is likely to reassert itself in the coming decade (2020's)," he wrote. ["Broken BRICS: Why the Rest Stopped Rising" Foreign Affairs Nov/Dec 2012].

The United States

At the same time, in articles for The Atlantic and other magazines, Sharma argued that the star of the 2020s was more likely to be the United States, which had seen its global reputation battered by the 2008 financial crisis. He cited five key factors pointing to a US comeback, all related to the superior flexibility of the US system, compared to its peers. The US was paying down its private debts faster than European rivals or Japan. The dollar was at its most competitive level in three decades (in real terms). The US remained the hub of technological innovation. The revolution in US shale oil and gas was greatly lowering energy costs. All these factors were helping to spur a US renaissance in manufacturing, putting the US in position to be the "breakout nation of the developed world," if it can address its Achilles heel: rising government debt.

By 2020, Sharma was arguing that the cycles were shifting again, bringing a new set of potential winners and losers to the fore. In "The Comeback Nation," a long essay for Foreign Affairs in March that year ["The Comeback Nation," Foreign Affairs March 31, 2020], Sharma pointed out that the United States had seen its share of global GDP expand over the previous decade, restoring its reputation as an economic superpower. It had also emerged more influential than ever as a financial superpower, with a greatly expanded share of global financial markets, and the dollar more dominant than ever as the world's most popular currency.

His message remained the same: don't believe the rosy straight-line forecasts, don't expect another golden decade for America. The United States was starting to show signs of the complacency and excess—particularly in the form of rising debt—that often develop in the course of a long boom. The next stars were still likely to come from outside the circle of hype.

China

Throughout, Sharma has been seen as something of a pessimist on the biggest economy story of the century, the rise of China. As early as Breakout Nations [Breakout p 17-18], he was arguing that both bullish forecasts of continued double digit growth, and bearish predictions of a coming collapse, were overwrought. Fundamental historic patterns were however pointing to a likely slowdown in China, including its aging population, its mounting debts, and its entry into the middle class of nations, which has always made it near impossible for countries to sustain a double digit growth rate.

By 2016, Sharma was warning in the pages of the NY Times ["How China Fell Off the Miracle Path", NYT June 3, 2016] that China was in the midst of the biggest debt binge every indulged by an emerging economy, and that binges of that scale had always, in the past, led to a severe recession, a financial crisis or both. Four years later, also in the NY Times ["How Technology Saved China’s Economy" Jan 20, 2020] Sharma pointed out that growth had in fact slowed sharply, from double digits to 6 percent (officially) and even slower by private estimates, weighed down as he had expected by demographics, debt, and economic maturity.

But there still had been no major recession and no crisis. China had been "saved" by the emergence of a new growth driver: its booming tech sector, and the giant internet companies it is generating. In the summer of 2021, asked on CNBC about the widening crackdown Beijing had launched against multibillionaire internet tycoons, Sharma pointed out the risk and irony of the moment: China was targeting its economic saviors ["Didi crackdown appears part of China's reaction to 'unbridled capitalism'; YouTube June 7, 2021].

India

Sharma argued as early as 2012 that India had the best chance among the BRICs to become a breakout nation (one that grows faster than rivals in the same income class) but its chance at only 50/50. That provoked debate in India, where many said he was too pessimistic (link to "50-50 India" Shreyashi Singh, The Diplomat, April 26, 2012.) Sharma argued for some time that India's growth shows a clear pattern, rising and falling with the tides of the global economy, never getting ahead of the pack. He has written that to break out, India needs to develop a stronger, more sustained will to reform, as East Asian success stories have in the past.

Sharma has also made the case that India is less a country than a continent, with more different states, communities and languages than the European Union [India's States of Excellence, Time, May 20, 2013]. Thus he has argued that India is best governed as a federation, allowing each distinct wide latitude to control its own destiny, rather than trying to centralize power in Delhi—as prime minister Narendra Modi has done ["As Modi discovered, India’s economy will never look like China's" Washington Post April 25, 2019].

In his 2019-book about India, Democracy on the Road, Sharma chronicled his quarter century of travels through his homeland, putting in thousands of miles covering major state and national elections. He writes that while he grew up hoping for a Ronald Reagan-type reformer, he has grown to accept that India's political DNA is fundamentally socialist and statist, and that this basic outlook defines the worldview of all the leading parties.

== Awards ==
- In 2012, Sharma was selected as one of the top global thinkers by Foreign Policy magazine.
- In June 2013, Outlook named Sharma as one of The World's 25 Smartest Indians.
- Breakout Nations debuted as the No 1 bestseller in India, and earned Sharma the Tata Literature Live! First Book Award for 2012.
- Breakout Nations made The Wall Street Journal hardcover business bestseller list, and was chosen by Foreign Policy as one of its "21 Books to Read in 2012".
- In 2015, Sharma was named by Bloomberg Markets to be one of the 50 Most Influential people in the world.

== Personal life ==
Asked where a constant traveler feels at home, Sharma has told interviewers "I'm from all over the place, but India remains home". Born in Wellington in The Nilgiris district in the southern Indian state of Tamil Nadu, Sharma was educated in Delhi, Bombay and Singapore and has lived in New York for nearly two decades.

Sharma has told interviewers his passions are politics, films, and sprinting. Since 1998, he has been leading a group of some 20 top Indian journalists on a road trip, following Indian general elections and key state assembly elections and interviewing top Indian politicians on background.

Sharma says he tries to train as a sprinter 6 days a week, whether traveling or not. In 2011, he ran in the 100-meter and 4 x 100 relay events, representing India at the World Masters, an international competition for athletes over the age of 35, in Sacramento, Calif. He is single and lives in New York City.

== Books written ==
- Breakout Nations (2012)
- The Rise and Fall of Nations: Forces of Change in a Post-Crisis World (2016)
- Democracy on the Road (2019)
- The 10 Rules of Successful Nations (2020)
- What Went Wrong with Capitalism (2024), Simon & Schuster

== See also ==
- Asset management
- Indians in the New York City metropolitan region
- Investment banking
- Mancur Olson
