= K2VC =

Chinese venture capital firm

- Native name: 险峰
- Formerly: China Renaissance K2 Ventures
- Company type: Private
- Industry: Venture capital
- Founded: 2010; 16 years ago
- Founders: Chen Keyi; Bao Fan
- Headquarters: Beijing, China
- AUM: US$1.4 billion (2024)
- Website: www.k2vc.com

K2VC (Chinese: 险峰; pinyin: Xiǎnfēng) is a Chinese venture capital (VC) firm headquartered in Beijing that focuses on angel investing and early stage companies.

As of 2024, K2VC has invested in over 700 companies.

== Background ==
The firm was founded in 2010 by Chen Keyi and China Renaissance founder Bao Fan. It originally operated under the name China Renaissance K2 Ventures. The name came from K2, the world's second-highest mountain.

K2VC historically focuses on companies in the technology, media and telecommunications (TMT) sector as an angel investor.

In December 2015, the firm changed its name to K2VC and ceased using the China Renaissance name. K2VC operates independently of China Renaissance.

In 2016, K2VC launched its first venture capital fund with a focus on investments in the healthcare sector.

In 2017, Li Li who was a K2VC managing partner left the firm to found Next Capital which K2VC invested in as a limited partner. In January 2019, K2VC served ties with Next Capital and publicly issued a statement attacking Next Capital for allegedly stealing confidential information from it.
