= Isabelle Ealet =

French businesswoman (born 1936)

- Born: c. 1963
- Other name: "Queen of Commodities"
- Occupation: Investment manager
- Honours: Legion of Honour (2015)

Isabelle Ealet (born c. 1963) is a French businesswoman and investment manager who served as the global head of Goldman Sachs' securities division from 2007 to 2018. She served as an advisor on commerce to the French embassy in London.

== Early life and education ==
Ealet was born to Colonel Edouard Ealet, an Officier in the Légion d’Honneur, the Ordre national du Mérite and the Ordre du Mérite Saharien. Ealet said that her father instilled in her his “taste for challenge, independence and devotion to his country”. Her grandfather, Albert Franchini, was Chevalier in the Ordre national du Mérite. Growing up, Ealet aspired to be a pilot in the French Air Force. She graduated from Ecole Supérieure de Commerce de Marseille in 1982 before attending the Paris Institute of Political Studies (Sciences Po).

== Personal ==
Ealet is married to John Corbani. They have two children.

== Career ==
After graduating she began working at French oil company, Total, as a product distributor. Her experience in the oil industry prompted Goldman Sachs to recruit her as an oil products trader in 1991. Ten years later, aged 37, she was promoted to firm partner and in 2007, she was asked to lead the company's commodities division. Nicknamed the "Queen of Commodities" she transitioned the firm to the derivatives market during the late 2000s and early 2010s. At the time of her departure in 2018, she was one of four women on Goldman's 30-person management team.

== Awards and honors ==
- In 2015, she was awarded the insignia of Chevalier in the 'Ordre national de la Légion d’Honneur' (Legion of Honour).

== See also ==
- List of former employees of Goldman Sachs
