= IntraFi =

American firm

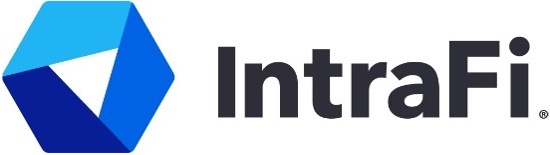
- Formerly: Promontory Interfinancial Network
- Industry: Financial services
- Founded: 2002
- Headquarters: Arlington, Virginia, U.S.
- Key people: Mark Jacobsen (cofounder & CEO)
- Website: www.intrafi.com

IntraFi, LLC (formerly Promontory Interfinancial Network) is a privately held firm with a network of more than 3,000 financial institutions, three-quarters of all U.S. commercial banks and thrifts as members. Among its members are 23 of 25 top U.S. banks and 95% of all U.S. community banks. The company’s headquarters is in Arlington, Virginia.

== History ==
The company was founded in 2002 by a number of former federal banking regulators with the goal of increasing the security of large deposits. Bank of New York Mellon (BNY Mellon) provides issuance, custody, settlement, and recordkeeping services for IntraFi. IntraFi has been ranked by the Washington Post as a top workplace in 2018, 2021, 2023 and in American Banker's list of Best Places to Work in Fintech 2018, 2021-2024, including first place in 2018 and 2021.

The co-founder and CEO of the company is Mark Jacobsen, a former chief of staff of the Federal Deposit Insurance Corporation (FDIC) and inventor of 13 patents related to IntraFi's FDIC-insured deposit placement services. The company changed its name to IntraFi Network in 2020.

IntraFi’s participating institutions offer access to millions of dollars in aggregate FDIC insurance across network banks by placing funds in demand deposit accounts, money market deposit accounts, and certificate of deposit (CD) accounts at IntraFi network banks. Its services are anchored in using reciprocal deposits, which the company invented, and are a way for banks to exchange funds depending on their deposit or funding needs, to give depositors access to FDIC insurance above the limit of $250,000 through a single banking relationship. During the 2008 economic crisis, Reuters noted that IntraFi's services "rose in popularity.” “In 2023, IntraFi garnered significant attention after 3 regional bank failures spotlighted the risks of keeping large uninsured deposits at banks.”

In collaboration with the Community Development Bankers Association (CDBA) and National Bankers Association (NBA), in June 2024 IntraFi launched the Advancing Communities Together (ACT) program to boost deposits at banks catering to underserved communities.

== Services ==
IntraFi offers FDIC-insured deposit placement services, including ICS (IntraFi Cash Service), CDARS (Certificate of Deposit Account Registry Service), and IntraFi Sweep (formerly IntraFi Network Deposits).

Built on IntraFi’s technology for reciprocal deposits, these services give depositors a way to access millions of dollars in aggregate FDIC insurance through a single banking relationship. Funds are broken up into core deposits under the FDIC insurance limit of $250,000 either as deposit accounts (via ICS) or CDs (via CDARS), then spread across a network of well-capitalized and well-managed banks.

With IntraFi Sweep, broker-dealers and fintechs automatically transfer, or “sweep,” unused cash balances from customer brokerage accounts to interest-bearing deposit accounts at banks insured by the FDIC and savings associations. The banks may be affiliated or unaffiliated with the broker-dealer, and the banks acquire the cash as wholesale funding.

IntraFi also publishes a quarterly business outlook survey of banks. It also publishes a weekly podcast called “Banking With Interest,” which features lawmakers, regulators, journalists, bank executives, and others in the financial services space. Podcast guests have included Gary Cohn, Mark Cuban, Randal Quarles, Tom Emmer, Michael Hsu, and Esther George.
