= Francesco De Rubertis =

Venture capitalist

- Born: 23 January 1970 (age 56); Italy
- Education: University of Pavia (B.A.); University of Geneva (Ph.D.)
- Occupation: Partner at medicxi
- Spouse: Divorced from Sandra Henchoz since 2018

Francesco De Rubertis (born 23 January 1970) is a partner at medicxi, a venture capital firm with offices in London, Jersey and Geneva, having co-founded the firm in February 2016. Prior to that he was a partner at another venture capital firm, Index Ventures, having led the firm's efforts to establish its life sciences practice after joining in 1997.

== Early life and education ==
De Rubertis was born in Italy. He graduated from the University of Pavia with a Bachelor of Arts in Genetics and Microbiology, before earning a Ph.D. in Molecular Biology from the University of Geneva, where he also met his wife, Sandra Henchoz, who was a fellow student. De Rubertis engaged in postdoctoral research in molecular genetics at the Whitehead Institute at Massachusetts Institute of Technology (MIT), and later earned the Chartered Financial Analyst (CFA) designation.

== Career ==
After his postdoctoral work at MIT, in 1997 De Rubertis moved back to Geneva, where he joined Index Ventures and helped co-found the firm's life sciences practice. In 2009 he moved to London (site of another Index office) where he continues to reside.

De Rubertis is responsible for all of Index Ventures’ investments in the life sciences. He has served on the Boards of Directors of many companies, including Addex Therapeutics (SIX: ADXN), CellZome (acquired by GlaxoSmithKline for $120 Million), Genmab (Nasdaq Copenhagen: GEN), Molecular Partners (SIX: MOLN), PanGenetics (acquired by Abbott Laboratories), and Parallele Bioscience (acquired by Affymetrix).

In 2012 De Rubertis spearheaded the launch of Index Ventures’ $200 Million life sciences fund in partnership with GlaxoSmithKline (GSK) and Johnson & Johnson (J&J), to invest in early-stage biotechnology companies.

De Rubertis is the author of several publications in international scientific journals.

In 2010 De Rubertis was named by BioWorld as one of 28 "movers and shakers" predicted to shape the biotechnology industry over the next two decades.

In October 2012 De Rubertis was named by Xconomy as one of 40 of “Young and Proven” biotech venture capitalists.

De Rubertis is a member of the Strategic Advisory Board of the University of Geneva.

In February 2016 De Rubertis launches an independent venture capital firm Medicxi (formerly Index Ventures Life Sciences) and announces the closing of Medicxi Ventures 1 (MV1) a €210m fund including GSK and Johnson & Johnson Innovation.

Medicxi is managed by four Partners Francesco de Rubertis, Kevin Johnson, David Grainger and Michèle Ollier all of whom previously led the Life Sciences practice at Index Ventures.

On November 30, 2017, De Rubertis was named in the Bloomberg Top 50 most influential people of 2017. He was selected as one of 10 nominees in the Tech (& Science) category along with Elon Musk (Tesla, SpaceX), Masayoshi Son (SoftBank Group) and Martin Lau (Tencent Holdings).

The Bloomberg Top 50 consists of 5 categories Tech (& Science), Business, Politics, Finance and Entertainment.

De Rubertis's reputation for halving the time it takes for a return on biotech investments has Silicon Valley eager to get in on a $300 million fund he's raised for late-stage startups.
