= Odunayo Eweniyi =

Nigerian business executive

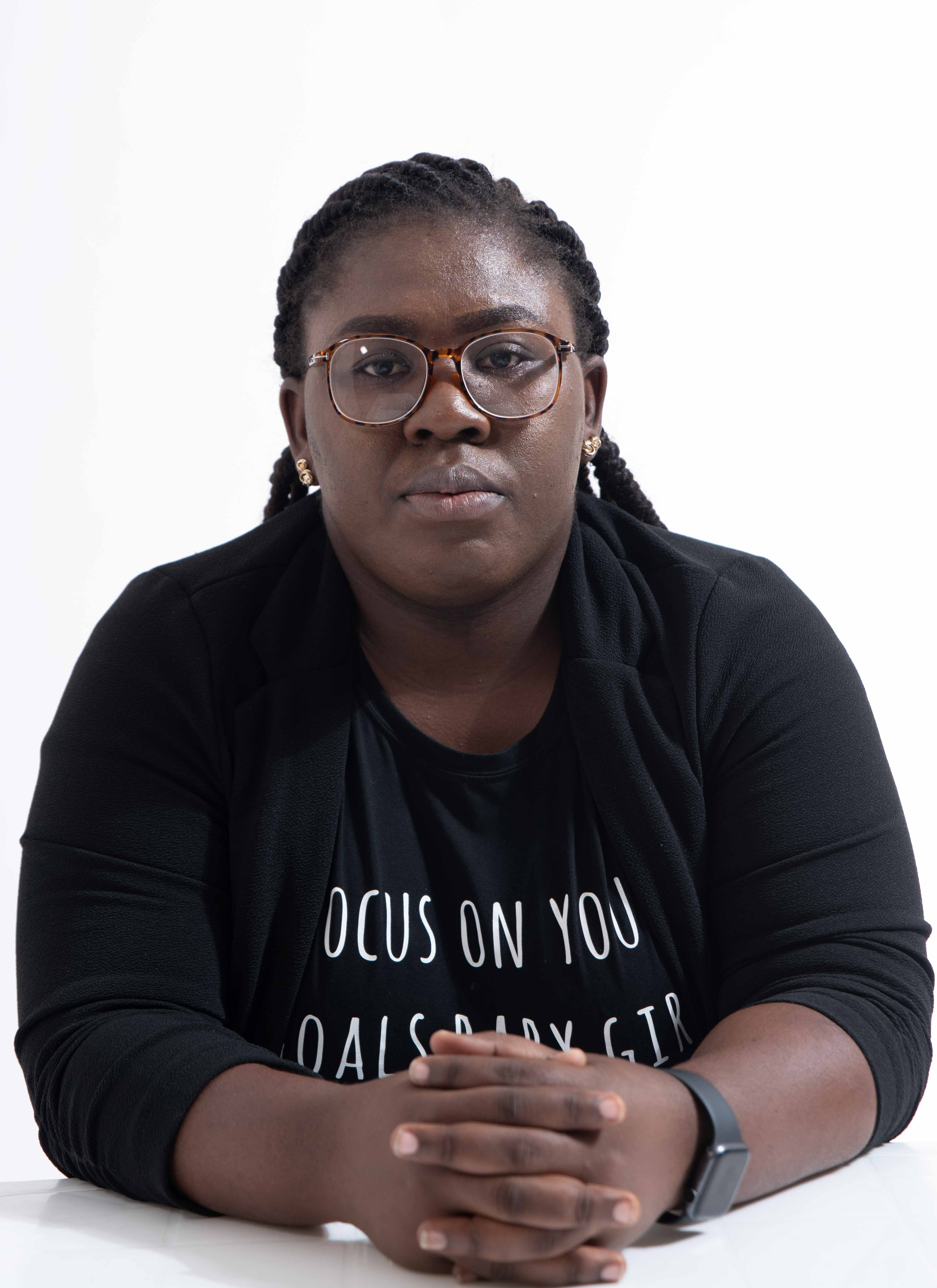
- Education: Covenant University
- Notable work: PiggyVest; Feminist Coalition
- Awards: Future Awards Africa

Odunayo Eweniyi is a Nigerian business executive and activist. She is the Co-founder and Chief Operations Officer PiggyVest and co-founder of Feminist Coalition.

== Background ==
Eweniyi is the first child of two professors with origins from Oyo State, Nigeria.

== Education and career ==
Eweniyi graduated from Covenant University in 2013 with a first-class degree in Computer Engineering. Eweniyi started out to launch Push CV with Somto Ifezue, Joshua Chibueze, Ayo Akinola, Terry Kanu, and Ibukun Akinola after her graduation in 2013. Two years later, the trio went on to start PiggyVest in 2016. Under her leadership as COO, PiggyVest has grown to become one of the largest digital savings and investment platforms in Nigeria, reaching over 5.5 million users by 2025.

== Awards ==
In 2018, Eweniyi won the Future Awards Africa Prize in Technology. In 2019, she was on Forbes Africa 30 under 30 Technology list. Eweniyi was named as one of 30 Quartz Africa Innovators for 2019.

Eweniyi was on Forbes Africa's list of 20 New Wealth Creators in Africa 2019. She was nominated for The Future Awards Africa Prize for Young Person of The Year in 2020. Eweniyi was also listed on Bloomberg 50 in 2020 and Time' Next 100 list in 2021 for her joint contributions during the End SARS protests of October 2020. In March 2022, she won the Forbes Woman Africa Technology and Innovation Award.

In 2022, Eweniyi was selected as a Bloomberg New Economy Catalyst. As part of the program, she attended the annual New Economy Forum held in Singapore, and the Bloomberg New Economy Catalyst Retreat that same year.

== Activism and ENDSARS ==
During the End SARS protests in 2020 against Nigerian police brutality, Eweniyi raised donations for medical care and legal support for victims of police brutality during and after the protests.

In January 2021, Eweniyi partnered with Eloho Oname to launch First Check, a platform of female business angels focused on supporting women led and women focused startups in Africa.
