= 2022 The Future Awards Africa =

- Presented by: The Future Project
- Hosted by: Tayo Faniran; Idia Aisien
- Website: www.awards.thefutureafrica.com

The 17th The Future Awards Africa (also known as 2022 The Future Awards Africa) released its nominees on Sunday, 24 September 2023. The award is to be hosted by Tayo Faniran and Idia Aisien at Federal Palace Hotel in Victoria Island, Lagos.

== Background ==
On 25 September 2023, the organizers of the 17th TFAA's Awards announced Mai Atafo, Oyinkansola Fawehinmi, Latasha Ngwube, Olumide Makanjuola, Adim Isiakpona, Aisha Augie, Mark Okoye, Aisha Yesufu, Dr. Melvis Ndiloseh, Gbemi Olateru Olagbegi, Tolulope Adedeji, Ayo Mairo-Ese, and Oluwasola Obagbemi, as members of its jury.

== Nominees ==
The following is a list of nominees:

Young Person of the Year	Education
Hilda Baci — Guinness World Record Holder; Oluwaseyi Moejoh — Climate Change and Youth Development Activist; Victor Osimhen — Professional Footballer; Rena Wakama — Coach of D'Tigress; Precious Eniayeka — Founder at Stellar Initiative; Enioluwa Adeoluwa — Content Creator	Aliu Toluwani Victor — CEO of Royal foundation Africa; Sultan Akintunde — CO founder and CTO AltSchool Africa; Demilade Adelaja — SDG Youth Advocate; Adaora Nwodo — Tech Content Creator; Uchechi Rochas — Director General of Rochas Foundation
Professional service	Law
Oghenerukevwe Toka — Social Media Manager, Consultant, and Coach; Phoebe Dami-Asolo — Marketing and Commercial Professional; Olubukayo Ewuoso — Digital Marketing Officer; Brian Muhumuza Bishanga — Intercontinental Publicist at BM Publications (Uganda); Fatima Jimanate Umar — Development Group Impact Analyst	Bioku Benjamin — Legal Manager at Sahara; Chidi Odoemenam — Senior Associate at Rendeavour Nigeria; Damilola Wright — Lawyer; Toyin Aiyepola — Lawyer
Entrepreneurship	Agriculture
Nathan Nwachukwu — CEO of Klas; Lukman Shobowale — Real Estate Expert; Jumoke Dada — Founder & CEO of Taeillo; Victor Ehindero — technology entrepreneur; Miracle Nwachukwu — Interior Designer; Victor Adegbile — CEO at Land Republic Limited; Bella Victor — Chairman of Lander Estate; Bright Sekoni — CEO of Audacia Properties; Sandra Chukwudozie — Founder & CEO – Salpha Energy; Noah Ibrahim — Co-founder – Eatnow.ng	Emmanuel Negedu — CEO of AgriLife youth; Joshua Ifezue — Founder of Jofez Agro; Joshua Okpata — Exxon Mobil Undergraduate Scholar
Technology	Photography
Weevil Company — Founders of Weevil Company; Victor Fatanmi — CEO of Fullgapco; David Onilude] — Founder of Tech Now Global; Yanmo Omorogbe — Co-founder and COO of Bamboo; Goodness Kayode — CEO of Sendchamp; Shodipo Ayomide — Engineering and Developer Relations Leader; Iyinoluwa Deborah Raj	Chika Onuu — Photographer and Videographer; Opeyemi Femi-Oke — Photographer; Deji Oluokun - Photographer & Owner of That Fashion Gvy; Ngozieme — Photographer; Akindele Ibukun — Lead director for VISUALCHEF.HO; Bolarinwa Yusuf — Owner of HOL Academy
Advocacy and Activism	Sport
Muhammad Kolo Muhammad — Play Metro; Odanye Kehinde — Youth Advocate; Osariemen Grace Omoruyi — Founder of Restorative Justice for Africa; Tobiloba Osogbiye — Public Affairs Officer	Victor Osimhen — Footballer; Tobi Amusan — Nigerian track and Field Athlete; Asisat Oshoala — Footballer; Michelle Alozie — Footballer; Mary Busayo Olatunji — Squash Player; Ese Brume — Athlete
ON-Air Personality	Journalism
Emmanuel Onwuka — Journalist; Ilowitdflo — TV Presenter; Karen Dimkpa — Queen of Pop Radio; Laila Johnson-Salami — Co-Anchor on Arise TV; Anita Akua Akuffo — Host and a Presenter; Adesola Balikis —Radio Presenter	Deborah Tolu Kayode — Communications Specialist; Akinlade Abiodun — Writer; Pelumi Salako — Freelance Journalist; Ore Ogunbiyi — Economist
Intrapreneurship	Health and Wellness
Tutu Adetunmbi — Content Marketing Consultant; Solomon O. Ayodele — Head of Innovation at WEMA Bank; Ernesto O. Dibia — Medical Laboratory scientist; Victor Okpala — Spotify's A&L Partnerships Manager for West Africa; Precious Akpan — Businesswoman	Mmekidmfon Umanah — Business Executive; Princess Ifeoma Ike — Public Health Optometrist; Emmanuel Oni — Businessman; Victor Amusan — Health Tracker
Fashion	Film
Uyiosa Omoregbe — Owner of NASO Clothing Brand; Rhoda Aguonigho — Fashion Consultant; Thebe Magugu — Fashion Designer; Veekee James — Fashion Designer; Gbemisola Okunlola — Founder of ALONUKO	Abula — Cinematographer; TG Omori — Music Video Director; Ovi Odiete — Nollywood Actor; Nora Awolowo — Producer, Cinematographer, and Filmmaker; Steven Ndukwu — Travel and Real Estate Content Curator; Ife Olujuyigbe — Filmmaker; Niyi Fagbemi — Filmmaker; Ifan Michael — Filmmaker
Acting	Content Creation
Mike Afolarin — Actor; Rahama Sadau — Actress; Moshood Fattah — Actor; Emeka Nwagbaraocha — Actor; Ama Qamata — Actress; Olumide Oworu — Actor; Tobi Bakre — Actor; Genoveva Umeh — Actress; Scarlet Gomez — Actress	Layi Wasabi — Content Creator; Fisayo Fosudo — Visual Storyteller; Korty EO — Filmmaker; Salem King — Content Creator; The Wisdom Man — Content Creator; Taaooma — Comedienne; Broda Shaggi — Comedian
Music	Governance
Ayra Starr — Singer; Asake — Artist; Libianca — Cameroonian Singer; Aya Nakamura — French Singer; Tayc — French Singer and Songwriter	Hakeem Onasanya — Head of Startups; Igunbor Sarah — Senior Assistant to Edo State Governor; Mustapha Isa Ozo — MD of A Public Relations and Digital Communication Company; Seun Olufemi White — Lawyer; Rukayat Shittu — Journalist; Khalil Halilu - CEO of National Agency for Science and Engineering Infrastructure
Community Action	Arts and Literature
GodsFavour Ahamisi — Game Changer in Community Action; Ndasadu lau Idris Bilyaminu — Founder of YapDfAfrica; Chioma Ukpabi — Founder of SUWK; Salawu Azeez — Climate Activist; Iresalewa Muhammed Bello — Founder of Nimah Andreh	Haneefah Abdulrahman — Writer; Michael Dubby — Entrepreneur; Morenike Olusanya — Book Cover Artist
Dance	Creativity and Innovation
Izzy Odigie — Choreographer; Regina Eigbe — Choreographer; Sherrie Silver — Choreographer; Dream Catchers — Dance Group	Victoria Adesanmi — Interior Designer; Hauwa Lawal — Screenwriter; Babatunde Sanni - Member of Ikorodu Bois; Intissar Bashir Kurfi — Environmentalist
Service to the Young
Melody Fidel — Entrepreneur; Bosun Tijani — Minister of Communications
