= 2021 Kids' Choice Awards =

Children's television awards show program broadcast in 2021

- Date: March 13, 2021
- Location: Barker Hangar (Note: The main stage for the ceremony was at the Barker Hangar, while a blimp 'traveled' to different destinations during the show including Stranger Things' Upside Down, Mars, Liza Koshy's house, and SpongeBob SquarePants' Bikini Bottom.); Santa Monica, California
- Hosted by: Kenan Thompson
- Most awards: BTS (3)
- Most nominations: Justin Bieber (5)

Television/radio coverage
- Network: Nickelodeon; TeenNick; Nicktoons; Nick Jr. Channel
- Runtime: 94 minutes
- Viewership: 0.53 million
- Produced by: Melissa M. Hill; Kathryn Rickey
- Directed by: Glenn Weiss

The 34th Annual Nickelodeon Kids' Choice Awards ceremony was held on March 13, 2021, at the Barker Hangar in Santa Monica, California with Kenan Thompson serving as host. It aired live on Nickelodeon and in a domestic simulcast with several other ViacomCBS cable networks, and was broadcast live or tape delayed across all of Nickelodeon's international networks.

The ceremony was held with most presenters, winners, and performers in-person, with some appearing virtually due to the ongoing COVID-19 pandemic. The show also featured an interactive fan wall to allow for an audience, and utilized XR technology throughout its broadcast. Justin Bieber performed "Intentions" with Quavo, as well as "Anyone" and "Hold On", the former originally being planned for the previous years' ceremony.

The show set a Guinness World Record for 'Most People Gunged/Slimed Simultaneously Online' with 195 participants. In addition, Millie Bobby Brown became only the second person since Amanda Bynes in 2003 to win both 'Favorite Movie Actress' and 'Favorite TV Actress' within the same ceremony. On March 18, it was announced that BTS set another world record after winning three awards in the ceremony, achieving them the Guinness World Record for 'Most Nickelodeon Kids' Choice Awards blimps won by a music group', with five overall (one each in 2018 and 2020).

A new episode of Danger Force led into the ceremony, while a new episode of Side Hustle served as the lead-out.

== Appearances ==
The ceremony featured appearances by celebrities including Anthony Anderson, Iain Armitage, Jayden Bartels, Joshua Bassett, Hailey Bieber, Millie Bobby Brown, BTS, Dove Cameron, Terry Crews, Charli D'Amelio, David Dobrik, Robert Downey Jr., Young Dylan, Gal Gadot, Jennifer Garner, Gabrielle Nevaeh Green, Tiffany Haddish, Kim Kardashian, Anna Kendrick, Heidi Klum, Liza Koshy, That Girl Lay Lay, Jules LeBlanc, Darci Lynne, Marsai Martin, Gaten Matarazzo, Lin-Manuel Miranda, Tyler Perry, Addison Rae, Noah Schnapp, JoJo Siwa, Sofía Vergara, and Finn Wolfhard. Also during the show were iCarly cast members Miranda Cosgrove, Nathan Kress, and Jerry Trainor all reuniting together, and Thompson's onscreen daughters of Kenan, Dani and Dannah Lane. Vice President of the United States, Kamala Harris, also made an appearance during the ceremony.

Presenters at the 2021 Kids' Choice Awards
Presenter(s)	Role
Anthony Anderson	Presented 'Favorite Voice from an Animated Movie'
David Dobrik	Presented 'Favorite Female Social Star'
Young Dylan	Presented 'Favorite Family TV Show'
Hailey Bieber	Presented 'Favorite Music Collaboration' and 'Favorite Male Artist'; Introduced Justin Bieber featuring Quavo
Lin-Manuel Miranda	Presented 'Favorite Reality Show'
Joshua Bassett Addison Rae	Presented 'Favorite Movie Actress'
Dove Cameron	Introduced 'Favorite Song' medley
Gabrielle Nevaeh Green	Presented 'Favorite Song'
Tiffany Haddish	Presented 'Favorite Movie Actor'
Marsai Martin Kim Kardashian Tyler Perry Yara Shahidi	Preview of Paw Patrol: The Movie
Jennifer Garner	Presented 'Generation Change'; Introduced Kamala Harris
Lincoln Loud Michelangelo Raphael Leonardo Donatello	Presented 'Favorite Animated Movie', 'Favorite Female Sports Star', 'Favorite Male TV Star', 'Favorite Kids' TV Show', 'Favorite Female Artist', and 'Favorite Male Sports Star'
Gabrielle Nevaeh Green	Presented 'Favorite Animated Series'
Dixie D'Amelio	Introduced Justin Bieber
Miranda Cosgrove Nathan Kress Jerry Trainor	Presented 'Favorite Movie'

== Performers ==
Performers at the 2021 Kids' Choice Awards
Performer(s)	Song(s)
Justin Bieber Quavo	"Intentions"
Various	Favorite Song medley "Cardigan" – Jules LeBlanc (originally performed by Taylor Swift) "Wonder" – Good NEWZ Girls (originally performed by Shawn Mendes) "Yummy" – Darci Lynne (originally performed by Justin Bieber) "Toosie Slide" – That Girl Lay Lay & Young Dylan (originally performed by Drake) "Blinding Lights" – Jayden Bartels (originally performed by The Weeknd) "Dynamite" (originally performed by BTS)
Justin Bieber	"Hold On" "Anyone"

== Winners and nominees ==
The nominees were announced and voting opened on February 2, 2021. Voting ended on March 13, 2021. The winners are listed first, highlighted in boldfaced text.

=== Movies ===
Favorite Movie	Favorite Movie Actor
**Wonder Woman 1984**; Dolittle; Hamilton; Hubie Halloween; Mulan; Sonic the Hedgehog	**Robert Downey Jr.** – Dolittle as Dr. John Dolittle; Jim Carrey – Sonic the Hedgehog as Dr. Robotnik; Will Ferrell – Eurovision Song Contest: The Story of Fire Saga as Lars Erickssong; Lin-Manuel Miranda – Hamilton as Alexander Hamilton; Chris Pine – Wonder Woman 1984 as Steve Trevor; Adam Sandler – Hubie Halloween as Hubie Dubois
Favorite Movie Actress	Favorite Animated Movie
**Millie Bobby Brown** – Enola Holmes as Enola Holmes; Gal Gadot – Wonder Woman 1984 as Diana Prince/Wonder Woman; Anne Hathaway – The Witches as Grand High Witch; Vanessa Hudgens – The Princess Switch: Switched Again as Princesses; Yifei Liu – Mulan as Mulan; Melissa McCarthy – Superintelligence as Carol Peters	**Soul**; Onward; Phineas and Ferb the Movie: Candace Against the Universe; The Croods: A New Age; Trolls World Tour; Scoob!
Favorite Voice from an Animated Movie
**Anna Kendrick** – Trolls World Tour as Poppy; Tina Fey – Soul as 22; Jamie Foxx – Soul as Joe Gardner; Chris Pratt – Onward as Barley Lightfoot; Ryan Reynolds – The Croods: A New Age as Guy; Emma Stone – The Croods: A New Age as Eep; Justin Timberlake – Trolls World Tour as Branch

=== Television ===
Favorite Kids' TV Show	Favorite Family TV Show
**Alexa & Katie**; Are You Afraid of the Dark?; Danger Force; Henry Danger; High School Musical: The Musical: The Series; Raven's Home	**Stranger Things**; Black-ish; Cobra Kai; Fuller House; The Mandalorian; Young Sheldon
Favorite Male TV Star	Favorite Female TV Star
**Jace Norman** – Henry Danger/Danger Force as Henry Hart/Kid Danger; Iain Armitage – Young Sheldon as Sheldon Cooper; Joshua Bassett – High School Musical: The Musical: The Series as Ricky; Dylan Gilmer – Tyler Perry's Young Dylan as Young Dylan; Caleb McLaughlin – Stranger Things as Lucas Sinclair; Finn Wolfhard – Stranger Things as Mike Wheeler	**Millie Bobby Brown** – Stranger Things as Eleven; Ella Anderson – Henry Danger as Piper Hart; Candace Cameron Bure – Fuller House as D.J. Tanner-Fuller; Camila Mendes – Riverdale as Veronica Lodge; Raven-Symoné – Raven's Home as Raven Baxter; Sofia Wylie – High School Musical: The Musical: The Series as Gina
Favorite Reality Show	Favorite Animated Series
**America's Got Talent**; American Idol; American Ninja Warrior Junior; Lego Masters; The Masked Singer; The Voice	**SpongeBob SquarePants**; ALVINNN!!! and the Chipmunks; Lego Jurassic World: Legend of Isla Nublar; Teen Titans Go!; The Boss Baby: Back in Business; The Loud House

=== Music ===
Favorite Music Group	Favorite Male Artist
**BTS**; Black Eyed Peas; Blackpink; Jonas Brothers; Maroon 5; OneRepublic	**Justin Bieber**; Drake; Post Malone; Shawn Mendes; Harry Styles; The Weeknd
Favorite Female Artist	Favorite Song
**Ariana Grande**; Beyoncé; Billie Eilish; Selena Gomez; Katy Perry; Taylor Swift	**"Dynamite"** – BTS; "Yummy" – Justin Bieber; "Toosie Slide" – Drake; "Wonder" – Shawn Mendes; "Cardigan" – Taylor Swift; "Blinding Lights" – The Weeknd
Favorite Music Collaboration	Favorite Global Music Star
**"Stuck with U"** – Ariana Grande & Justin Bieber; "Be Kind" – Marshmello & Halsey; "Holy" – Justin Bieber & Chance the Rapper; "Ice Cream" – Blackpink & Selena Gomez; "Lonely" – Justin Bieber & Benny Blanco; "Rain on Me" – Lady Gaga & Ariana Grande	**BTS** (Asia); David Guetta (Europe); Master KG (Africa); Savannah Clarke (Australia); Sebastián Yatra (Latin America); Taylor Swift (North America)

=== Sports ===
Favorite Male Sports Star	Favorite Female Sports Star
**LeBron James**; Tom Brady; Stephen Curry; Patrick Mahomes; Lionel Messi; Russell Wilson	**Simone Biles**; Alex Morgan; Naomi Osaka; Candace Parker; Megan Rapinoe; Serena Williams

=== Miscellaneous ===
Favorite Male Social Star	Favorite Female Social Star
**James Charles**; Jason Derulo; David Dobrik; Ryan's World; MrBeast; Ninja	**Charli D'Amelio**; Emma Chamberlain; GamerGirl; Addison Rae; JoJo Siwa; Maddie Ziegler
Favorite Video Game
**Among Us**; Animal Crossing: New Horizons; Fortnite; Minecraft; Pokémon Go; Roblox

== Special Recognition ==
=== Generation Change ===
- Kamala Harris

== International ==
The following are nominations for awards to be given by Nickelodeon's international networks.

Favorite Star (Africa)	Favorite Social Star (Africa)
Mo Salah; Sadio Mane; Sheebah; Siya Kolisi; Thuso Mbedu; Zozibini Tunzi	Emmanuella; Bonang Matheba; Elsa Majimbo; Ghetto Kids; Ikorodu Bois; Wian Van Den Berg
Aussie/Kiwi Legend of the Year	Favorite Star (Belgium)
Savannah Clarke; G Flip; Jacob Elordi; Patty Mills; Lauren Curtis	Pommelien Thijs; Celine Dept & Michiel Callebaut; Jamal Ben Saddik; Karen Damen; Nora Gharib
Best Fan Squad (Netherlands & Belgium)	Favorite Star (Netherlands)
Fource; Belgian Crew (Marco Rondas, Steffi Mercie, Nour & Fatma, Laura Kumpen, Stiend Edlund, Luna Duval & Maude van der Vorst); Bibi; Kwebbelkop; Spaze	NikkieTutorials; Eloise van Oranje; Nienke Plas; Numidia; Rolf Sanches
Brazilian Influencer	Brazilian Fandom
Enaldinho; Bibi Tatto; Juju Franco; Sophia Valverde; Luara Fonseca; Igor Jansen	#Uniters – Now United; #Gavassiers – Manu Gavassi; MC Soffia; #Beers – Giulia Be; Carol & Vitoria; Vitor Kley
Favorite Singers (Germany, Austria & Switzerland)	Favorite Song (Germany, Austria & Switzerland)
Lena; LEA; Mark Forster; Nico Santos; Wincent Weiss; Zoe Wees	"Übermorgen" – Mark Forster; "Verlierer" – Luna; "In Your Eyes" – Robin Schulz feat. Alida; "Control" – Zoe Wees
Favorite Footballers (Germany, Austria & Switzerland)	Favorite Social Media Star (Germany, Austria & Switzerland)
Toni Kroos; Alexandra Popp; Erling Haaland; Lena Oberdorf; Leon Goretzka	Younes Zarou; Dalia; Joey's Jungle; Julia Beautx; Leoobalys; Mai Thi Nguyen-Kim (maiLab)
Favorite Nick Character (Germany, Austria & Switzerland)	Favorite Team (Germany, Austria & Switzerland)
Kid Danger – Henry Danger; Captain Man – Henry Danger/Danger Force; Emily – Spotlight; Greta – Spotlight; Lincoln Loud – The Loud House; SpongeBob – SpongeBob SquarePants	The Voice of Germany 2020 (Coaches); Spotlight; Jan Köppen & Frank Buschmann; Jim Knopf und die Wilde 13
Favorite Star (Hungary)	New Favorite Star (Italy)
Szomjas Jennifer; Dallos Bogi; Vanek Andor; Bona Bianka	Michelangelo Vizzini; Antony; SickVladi; VirgiTsch; Yusuf Panseri
Favorite Internet Star (Italy)	Favorite Comic Star (Italy)
Cecilia Contarano; DinsiemE; Ryan Prevedel; Simone Berlini; Swami Caputo	Daniele Davi; Martina Socrate; Paky; Scottecs; Tommaso Cassissa
Favorite Influencer (Latin America)	Favorite Fandom (Latin America)
Fede Vigevani; YOLO Adventuras; Eloisa Os; Mis Pastelitos; The Donato; Antrax	#Skuad – Skabeche; #Dreamers – Danna Paola; #CNCowners – CNCO; #Balovers – Bala; #LaTribu – Camilo; #Cachers – Calle y Poché
Favorite Star (Arabia)	Favorite Star (Poland)
The Saudi Reporters; Azza Zarour; Bessan Ismail; Omar Farooq	Viki Gabor; Iga Świątek; Marcin Maciejczak; Sanah; Sylwia Lipka
Favorite Influencer (Poland)	Favorite Internet Star (Portugal)
Maria Jeleniewska; Antonina Flak; Charazinsky; Kacper JASPER Porebski; Kinga Sawczuk	Mafalda Creative; Madalena Aragão; Sea3PO (Catarina Lawndes); João Félix
Favorite Star (Romania)	Favorite Star (Russia)
Irina Rimes; Mimi; Rengle; Selly; Smiley	Группа Dabro; DETKI; Kucher; Lidus
Favorite House of Bloggers (Russia)	Favorite "Ship" of the Year (Russia)
BIP House; Dream Team House; Super House; XO Team	Аня Pokrov и Артур Бабич; Ваша Маруся и Олег Ликвидатор; Eva Miller и Gary; Катя Адушкина и Сёма Ким
Favorite Artist (Spain)	Favorite Influencer (Spain)
Elashow; Flavio; Karina & Marina; María Parrado	El mundo de Indy; Daniela YouTuber; Fabio Mufañas; Joaquinrs
