= 2024 The Future Awards Africa =

- Presented by: The Future Project
- Hosted by: Ladipoe, Mbryo, and Andre Vibez
- Website: www.awards.thefutureafrica.com

The 18th The Future Awards Africa (also known as 2024 The Future Awards Africa) released its nominees on Sunday, 21 September 2024. The award is to be hosted by Ladipoe, Mbryo, and Andre Vibez at Federal Palace Hotel in Victoria Island, Lagos.

== Nominees ==
The following is a list of nominees:

Young Person of the Year	Education
Seun Olagunju; Victory Ashaka; Tunde Onakoya; Funmi Oduwaiye	Odunayo Aliu; Kudakwashe Foya; Obasanjo Fajemirokun; Jennifer Jonathan; Aramide Kayode
Professional service	Law
Hammed Alabi; Mark-Anthony Ezeoha; Felix Ohaeri; Stanley Nweke-Eze; Aboyowa Ikpobe	Rosemond Phil-Othihiwa; Anita Osarieme; Victoria Oloni; Ayooluwa Oderinde; Bernice Asein
Entrepreneurship	Agriculture
Promise Ovai Kenneth-Odum (CEO Rukkies Decor); Oluwole Fapohunda (CEO Seven30 Real Estate Ltd); Bayo Lawal (Co-founder Dukiya Investment); Miracle Onuoha (CEO The Fluiide Company Ltd); Williams Fatayo (CEO MovebytruQ)	Etimbuk Imuk; Esohe Ekunwe; Azeez Salawu; Nyifamu Manzo
Technology	Photography
Tobi Ololade (Founder Dojah); Itunu Olufemi (Founder Brainary Technology Education); Johnson Jaiyeola (CEO Helgg Scooters LTD); Femi Aluko (CEO & Co-founder Chowdeck Logistics); Kelvin Umechukwu (CEO & Co-founder Bumpa)	Omoboyejo Oyewusi (ItsBoye); Onuchukwu Timothy (MyDadsBoss); Chika Onuu; Enoshowo Eworo (Captured by Adesuwa); Ifeoluwa Babalola (SnappCode)
Advocacy and Activism	Sport
Fauzuddeen Mahmud; Amrah Aliyu; Jude McKelvin Oseh; Tolulope Theresa Gbenro; Mukthar Halilu Modibbo	Victor Boniface; Ademola Lookman; Sukurat Aiyelagbegan; Amy Okonkwo; Elizabeth Oshoba
ON-Air Personality	Journalism
Seyebomi Ogunsanya (Sheye Banks); Ope Keshinro (SwitOpe); Ita Nsikan-Abasi Asuquo (Grandprince Ita); Emmanuella Isioma Odiatu; Osato Edokpayi (Osato EDK)	Adesuwa Giwa Osagie; Zainab Bala; Blessings Mosugu; Eniola Olatunji; Abubakar Ibrahim Olaye
Intrapreneurship	Health and Wellness
Victor Okpala; Hakeem Akiode; Debbie Larry-Izamoje; Mary Edoro; Salman Dantata	Olabintan Odunola; Yewande Benn; Dr. Kiki Diorgu; Dr. Olusina Ajidahun; Amanda Ihemebiri
Fashion	Film
Ikechukwu Urum (Founder Jabari Model Management); Phupho Gumede K; Muftau Femi Ajose (Founder Cute Saint); Amy Aghomi; Olayinka Ashogbon (Founder AshLuxe)	Akinkunle Michael Akinrogunde (AMA Psalmist); Praise Onyeagwalam (Director Pink); Tola Okodugha; Fadamana Okwong; Feyifunmi Oginni
Acting	Content Creation
Genoveva Umeh; Uche Montana; Mike Afolarin; Kayode Ojuolape; Jide Oyegbile (J-Blaze)	Isaac Olayiwola (Layi Wasabi); Winifred Nwania (Zeelicious); Joseph Onaolapo (Jay On Air); Nonye Udeogu (This Thing Called Fashion); Folagade Banks (Mama Deola)
Music	Governance
Chimamanda Chukwuma Pearl (Qing Madi); Ayobami Alli-Hakeem (AnEndlessOcean); Daniel Etiese Benson (BNXN); Michael Adebayo Olayinka (Ruger); John Saviours Udomboso (Young John)	Muhammad Sani Kassim; Abdulhaleem Ringim; Damilola Yusuf Adelodun; Naufal Ahmad; Ayisat Agbaje-Okunade
Community Action	Arts and Literature
Chioma Ukpabi; Damilola Uzoma-Udoma; Doreen Omosele; Stanley Anigbogu; Ridwan AbdulRazaq	Mayowa Alabi (ShutaBug); Samson Bakare; Sylvestre Nsengimana; Ahmed Alsagheer; Damilare Kuku
Dance	Creativity and Innovation
Izzy Odigie — Choreographer; Regina Eigbe — Choreographer; Sherrie Silver — Choreographer; Dream Catchers — Dance Group	Shamsuddeen Jibril; Zonna (Zo Culture); Anita Ashiru; Salvation Uzoma (Ke0la); Ibukunoluwa Ajagbe (IBQuake)
Service to the Young
Melody Fidel — Entrepreneur; Bosun Tijani — Minister of Communications	
