= TEDxLagos =

Event in Lagos, Nigeria

- Website type: Conference
- Headquarters: Lagos, {{{location_country}}}
- Area served: Lagos
- Owner: Sapling Foundation
- Website: tedxlagos.com
- Registration: Mandatory
- Launched: 2018 (New license)
- Current status: Active

TEDxLagos is an independent TEDx event held annually in Lagos, Nigeria. Like other TEDx events, the event obtained a free license from TED to hold the conference, with organizers agreeing to follow certain principles. In 2018, the refreshed TEDxLagos hosted 12 speakers at the Muson Centre.

== History ==
TEDxLagos was founded as an independent TEDx event by the original organizers of TEDxGbagada. In 2018, TEDxLagos reviewed numerous candidates and hosted twelve speakers on August 18, 2018, at the Muson Centre, Lagos Island. The hosts for the pre-recorded event were Nigerian comedian Bovi and Award-winning media entrepreneur Uche Eze founder of BellaNaija, who is also a TEDGlobal Fellow. TEDxLagos partnered with the Skoll Foundation and Union Bank of Nigeria for the 2018 event.

=== 2019 ===
- Vivian Oputa
- Nireti adebayo
- Nse Ikpe-Etim
- Clare Omatseye
- Olumide Soyombo
- Alade Maryam and Okechukwu Emmanuel
- Victor Sanchez Aghahowa
- Ayorinde B James
- Otto Orondaam
- Isioma Williams
- The Cavemen

=== 2018 (Relaunch) ===
- Simidele Adeagbo
- Ade Olufeko
- Clare Omatseye
- Tokini Peterside
- Janah Ncube
- Femi Leye (Performer)
- Damilola Onafuwa
- Boye Olusanya
- Supo Shasore
- Banky W
- Anthonia Ojenagbon
- James George
- Tope Okupe
- Dreamcatchers (Performer)

=== 2013 ===
Rebranded from TEDxVictoriaIsland, the first version of TEDxLagos themed Inclusion, took place in 2013 under a different organizing committee.

- Kunlé Adeyemi
- Tayo Oviosu
- Kola Karim
- Deepankar Rustagi
- Bobo Omotayo
- Tannaz Bahnam
- Somi
- Kelechi Amadi-Obi
- Tunde Kelani
- Nkemdilim Begho
- Dr. Innocent Okuku
- Yewande Sadiku
- Tonye Cole
- Tope Sadiq
- Bilikiss Adebiyi Abiola
- Nnenna Onyewuchi
- Papa Njie
- Uwa Agbonile
- Bunmi Otegbade
- Chef Fregz
- eLDee
- Wumi Oghoetuoma
- Azu Nwagbogu

== See also ==
- Lagos Island
