= The Black Book (2023 film) =

- Directed by: Editi Effiong
- Written by: Bunmi Ajakaiye; Editi Effiong
- Produced by: Editi Effiong; Uyai Effiong; Kemi Lala Akindoju
- Starring: Richard Mofe-Damijo; Ade Laoye; Sam Dede; Ireti Doyle; Shaffy Bello
- Cinematography: Yinka Edward
- Edited by: Antonio Rui Ribeiro
- Music by: Kulanen Ikyo
- Production company: Anakle Films
- Distributed by: Netflix
- Release date: 22 September 2023
- Running time: 124 minutes
- Country: Nigeria
- Languages: English; Nigerian; Pidgin
- Budget: $1 million

The Black Book is a 2023 Nigerian crime thriller film produced and directed by Editi Effiong, starring Richard Mofe-Damijo, Sam Dede, Shaffy Bello, Femi Branch, Alex Usifo, Ade Laoye and Ireti Doyle. It was released on Netflix on 22 September 2023. With themes of government corruption, police brutality and the struggle of ordinary Nigerians for justice, the film became the first-ever Nigerian film to rank third on Netflix’s worldwide film charts and hit the streamer's Top 10 list in over 69 countries.

Following the killing of his innocent son, Paul Edima (Richard Mofe-Damijo) seeks to avenge his death and punish the mastermind, and his former boss, General Issa (Alex Usifo).

Nigerian online newspaper Premium Times likened Richard Mofe-Damijo's character to John Wick owing to the storyline centered on a former hitman who is drawn back into the criminal underworld.

== Plot ==
Professor Craig and his infant child are abducted on the streets of Lagos, Nigeria, by an armed gang intent on forcing his wife—a prominent anti-corruption leader—to resign. Despite her compliance with their demands, both her husband and child are brutally killed.

Corrupt policemen try to pin the killing on an innocent man, Damilola Edima, and he is killed in the process. Aspiring journalist Vic Kalu tries to help Paul Edima, Damilola's father, to uncover the truth. After learning from Kalu the identity of the men who killed his son, Edima abducts and tortures them and records their confession on camera. Kalu shows the video to her editor, who destroys it, arguing the case is too sensitive. The gang kills several police officers and order Nigerian police to accuse Edima, who is declared a public enemy.

General Issa sends sends his men to kill Edima, but he overcomes them. He refuses money from Issa to compensate him for the loss of his son and open war is declared between the two men. At the church where Vic Kalu was raised as an orphan, Edima confesses that he was once part of Issa's gang and the hitman who killed Kalu's mother, an investigative journalist who was going to publish an article about Issa's illegal activities. Edima subsequently left his criminal past behind him and has been leading a pious life as a deacon.

The church is stormed by armed men who abduct Kalu, while Edima escapes. He seeks the help of "Big Daddy", a powerful business woman with a private army of female soldiers. They hatch a plan to storm Issa's headquarters to free Kalu. Captured by the gang, Edima finds himself in a cell alone with Kalu, who attempts to kill him to revenge her mother. Soon afterwards, Big Daddy and her soldiers, disguised as farmers, invade the complex, and leave with a case they take from a safe. Edima explains to Kalu that after killing Kalu's mother, he refused to kill her and instead took her to a church. He then threatens General Issa that he will release the titular black book, in which he documented the gang's operations. In exchange for the book, Issa frees Edima and Kalu.

Big Daddy leaks a video showing the gang's killing of four army officers to cover-up illegal mining activities. The video triggers a military invasion of their headquarters. His members killed or having fled, Issa is alone and confronted by Edima and later arrested. Eventually, Vic Kalu retrieves the case and find inside Edima's black book. While Edima can finally bury his son, he asks Kalu to reveal the story to the press, prompting numerous public figures to be arrested.

== Selected cast ==
- Richard Mofe-Damijo as Paul Edima
- Ade Laoye as Vic Kalu
- Alex Usifo as General Issa
- Olumide Oworu as Damilola Edima
- Shaffy Bello as Big Daddy
- Kelechi Udegbe as Officer Abayomi
- Taiwo Ajai-Lycett as Editor
- Ireti Doyle as Commissioner
- Sam Dede as Angel
- Bimbo Akintola as Professor Craig
- Norbert Young as Mr Craig
- Femi Branch as Young General Issa
- Patrick Doyle as Senator Dipo
- Funky Mallam as Tanko
- Asabe Madaki as Baraka
- Bimbo Manuel as Reverend Father Omotosho
- Boki Ofodile as Chi Chi
- Jazzy Ogaga as Zara
- Denola Grey as Jesu
- Uzor Osimkpa as Adaobi
- Jetro Taiwo as Mo Dipo
- Sandra Ezekwesili as Radio narrator
- Joseph Momodu as Young Paul Edima

== Production ==
The film's executive producers include tech founders Kola Oyeneyin, Ezra Olubi (co-founder of Paystack), Odunayo Oweniyi (co-founder and COO of Piggyvest), Gbenga Agboola (founder and CEO of Flutterwave), Kola Aina (founding partner at Ventures Partner), and Olumide Soyombo (cofounder Blue Chip Technologies).

The film was produced with a budget of $1 million, making it the Most Expensive Movie Production in Nollywood.

== Awards and nominations ==
Year	Award	Category	Recipient	Result	Ref
2024	2024 Africa Magic Viewers' Choice Awards	Best Movie	Editi Effiong, Kemi Lala Akindoju	Nominated	
2024	2024 Africa Magic Viewers' Choice Awards	Best Art Direction	Pat Nebo and Chima Temple	Nominated	
2024	2024 Africa Magic Viewers' Choice Awards	Best Editing	Antonio Rui Ribeiro	Won	
2024	2024 Africa Magic Viewers' Choice Awards	Best Supporting Actress	Bimbo Akintola	Nominated	
2024	2024 Africa Magic Viewers' Choice Awards	Best Lead Actor	Richard Mofe Damijo	Nominated	
2023	2023 Africa International Film Festival (AFRIFF)	Outstanding Performance Awards	Richard Mofe Damijo	Won	
