= Fishbone (disambiguation) =

For the bones of a fish see fish bone

Fishbone may also refer to:

- Fishbone, U.S. alternative rock band formed in 1979 in Los Angeles, California
- Fishbone diagram, aka Ishikawa diagram, used to identify potential factors causing an overall effect
- Fishbone (EP), recording debut of alternative group Fishbone
- Fishbone (2021 film), a Bulgarian-Romanian fantasy drama film directed by Dragomir Sholev
- Fishbone (2020 film), a short film by Nollywood producer Editi Effiong
