= Steven Ndukwu =

Nigerian filmmaker and media entrepreneur

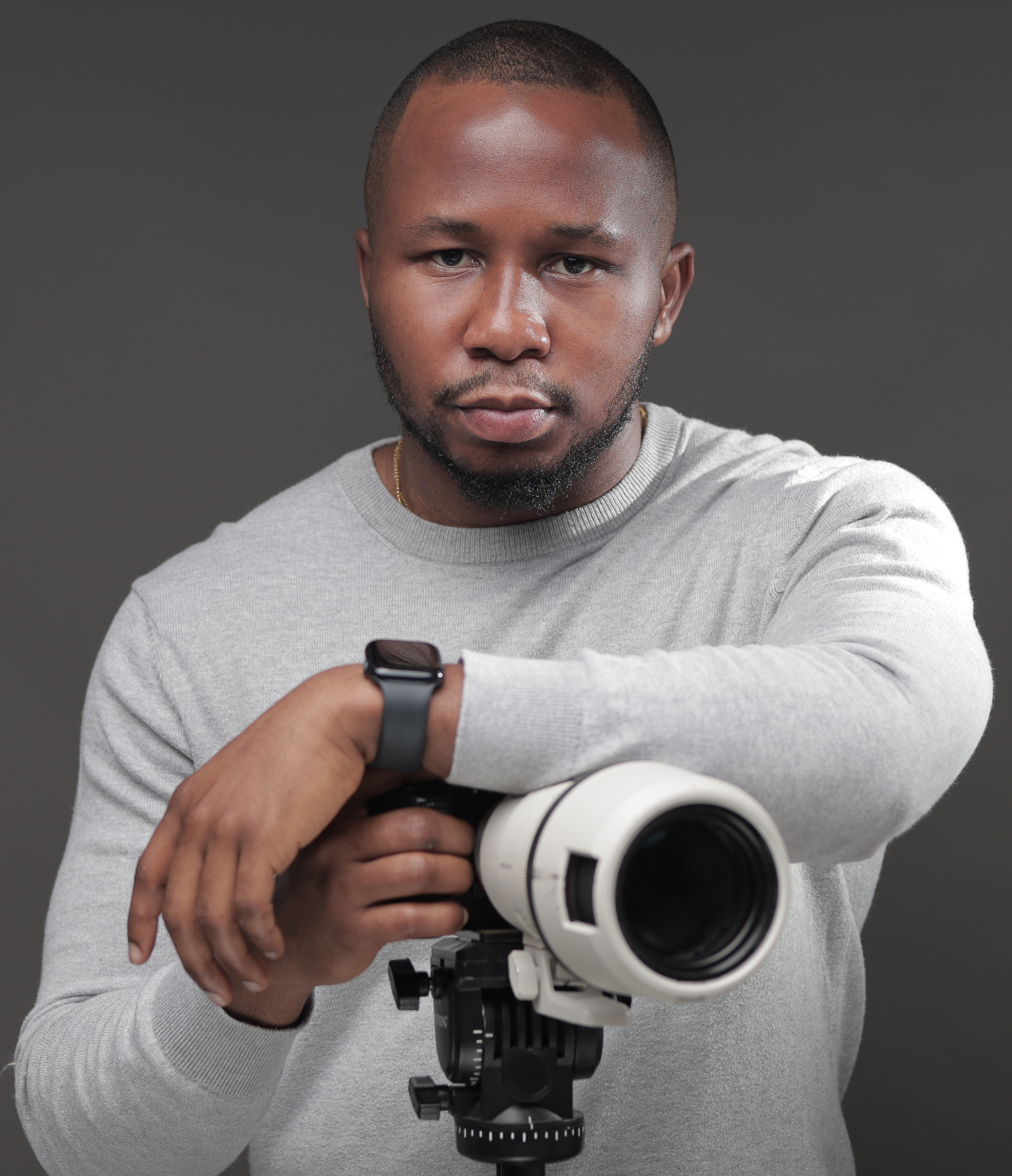
- Ndukwu in 2024
- Born: 15 June 1995 (age 31); Nigeria
- Occupations: Filmmaker, content creator, media entrepreneur
- Awards: Best Digital Content creator in Nigeria
- Honours: Nominated for the 2022 YouTube Black Class
- Website: stevenndukwu

Stephen Anthony Ndukwu (born 15 June 1995) popularly known as Steven Ndukwu is a Nigerian filmmaker, content curator and media entrepreneur from Lagos. His short films and documentaries center on projecting Africa's beauty, tourist destinations, culture, environment, people, African entrepreneurs and businesses in a positive way and as a center of attraction for foreign tourists. His YouTube content focuses mainly on destinations, cultures and real estate in African countries. In 2022, he appeared among the 26 selected African YouTube creators to join the second year of YouTube Black Voices Fund.

== Early life and education ==
He hails from Imo State, part of southeast Nigeria. He was born into a nuclear family of seven and raised alongside his four other siblings. He studied economics at the University of Calabar, Nigeria.

== Career ==
Ndukwu began his career as a graphic designer, videographer and web designer. A passionate viewer of YouTube videos he became interested in learning about cameras, drones, and filmmaking equipment and taught himself how to make videos. In 2017, he created his YouTube channel focused on instructing others on how to create video content. A trip to La Campagne, a beach resort in Lekki in Lagos State, proved to be a turning point for Ndukwu, setting him on a path to becoming an internet personality and influencer focused on showcasing African tourism and real estate. His travel vlog of his visit to La Campagne resonated with his followers, many who live outside the continent, and were surprised by its beauty. The reaction inspired Ndukwu to feature more content showing the attractive and upscale parts of Lagos and Nigeria and then Africa more broadly. As of 2023, he expanded his footprint to cover over 15 countries.

His content primarily showcases African cities, tourism sites and entrepreneurs with the aim to positively promote Africa and create awareness of its rich culture, diversity and potential. He also conducts interviews and investigative-type features. In April 2024, he visited Akon City, a planned city in the Thiès region of Senegal to investigate its viability. He has collaborated with organizations and brands that include World Trade Center Abuja, Zimbabwe Tourism Authority, Rwanda Development Board, Ogun State government, and Eko Atlantic City.

In 2022 he was one of 26 Africans selected to be part of the YouTube Black Voices Creator Class of 2022, an initiative funded by Google to empower black creators.

He has been featured in various media outlets, including Business Day, ThisDay Live, The Guardian, Nigerian Tribune, BellaNaija, Independent Newspaper, and TW Magazine3.

Ndukwu has advocated for strengthening private sector investment of Nigeria's tourism industry, pointing to Dubai as a model where the government has actively developed its tourism alongside private sector involvement.

As of November 2024, his YouTube channel has 519,000 subscribers and 209 videos.

== Personal life ==
He was born into the family of seven and has four siblings. He is single and does not have any children. He is a Christian and an Igbo from Imo state, southeast Nigeria.
