= Abula (cinematographer) =

Nigerian cinematographer

- Born: Abdulazeez Greene Oladimeji; 23 February; Lagos, Lagos State, Nigeria
- Education: Lagos State Model College, Igbogbo; Lagos State University
- Occupations: music video director, filmmaker, cinematographer, talent manager
- Spouse: Taaooma (m. 2021)

Abdulazeez Greene Oladimeji (born 23 February) known mononym as Abula, is a Nigerian-born cinematographer, music video director, commercial director, filmmaker, and talent manager. He is the CEO, and founder of The Greenade Company. He has directed music videos, and commercials for Zlatan, Fireboy DML, Portable, Dr Dolor, MohBad, Adekunle Gold, and Taaooma.

His production credit includes Zlatan's "My Body", Dr Dolor's "I go pay", "Madam The Madam", and Mohbad's "Ponmo Sweet".

== Biography ==
I was insulted several times in my struggling days.

— Abula

Abdulazeez Greene Oladimeji was born on 23 February, in Lagos. He attended Lagos State Model College, for his secondary education, and Lagos State University, for his Tertiary education. At the age of 13, he began shooting videos with his phone, and took it as a career while he was an undergraduate at Lagos State University, studying History and International Relations. In the mid-2010s, he relocated to Kwara State after his studies for his National Youth Service Corps. While still serving, he ventured into content creating and created the character, Sergeant Semiu Macaulay. During his stay in Kwara, he met Taaooma, who was an undergraduate at that time.

In 2016, he launched his professional career, as a video director in Abuja. In 2017, he came into the limelight and was credited as the co-director of "My Body" by Zlatan, and shot by Unlimited L.A. In 2018, Taaooma went viral for a skit he produced, about African Parents taking their kids to school. In 2020, he was credited for directing numerous music videos including "Ponmo Sweet" by Mohbad; and "I go pay" by Dr Dolors, starring Mercy Eke and Taaooma; which earned him a City People nomination in 2020, in the Music Video Director of the Year category. In 2022, he was the executive producer of Fireboy DML's Tiny Desk Concerts, and "Madam The Madam" by Dr Dolor, starring Regina Daniels.

== Personal life ==
In October 2020, he was engaged to Maryam Apaokagi (aka. Taaooma) in Namibia, and got married on 24 January 2021.

== Accolades ==
Year	Award	Category	Result
2020	City People Music Awards	Music Video Director of the Year	Nominated
2023	The Future Awards Africa	Prize for Film	Pending
