= Taaooma =

Nigerian online comedian

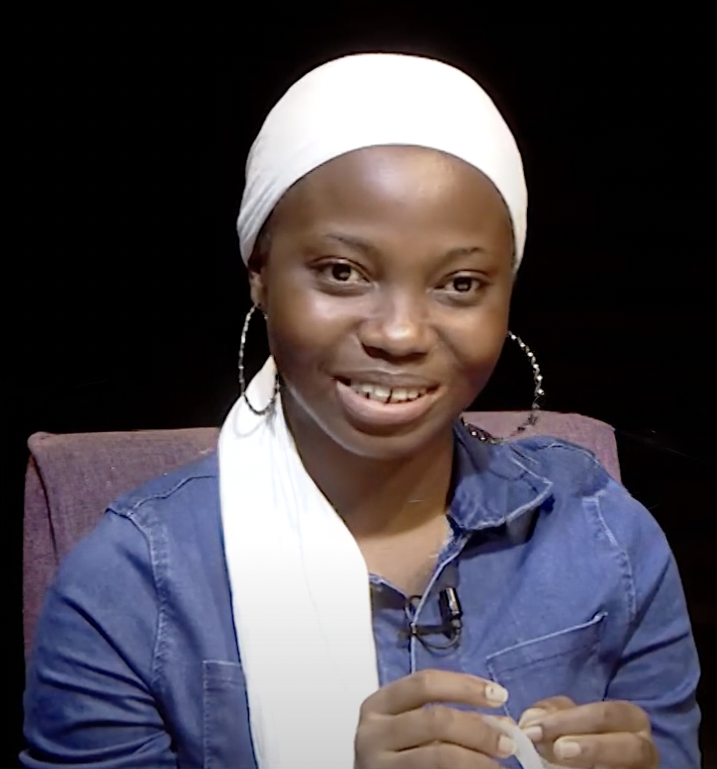
- Born: Maryam Apaokagi
- Education: Kwara State University
- Occupation: Comedian
- Spouse: Abula (m. 2021)

Maryam Apaokagi, known professionally as Taaooma, is a Nigerian comedian, content creator, cinematographer, and social media influencer. She is the CEO, and founder of Chop Tao, a food company, and directs for The Greenade Company, a cinematography firm. She is known for playing multiple roles in her skits.

== Early life ==
Maryam Apaokaigi spent most of her early years in Namibia. She studied Tourism and Travel Service Management at the Kwara State University. In 2022, she tells The Punch, “I wanted to be a doctor. Later, I changed it to a lawyer. I got to university and was offered Tourism.”

In 2015, she started online comedy after convincing her fiancé to teach her the basics of video editing. She rose to stardom in 2019 with a skit based on African parents taking their children to school. In 2019, she was the face of Media Room Hub’s July Issue. Her comedy skits are centered on exposing African mothers and their unique manner of disciplining African children with a slap.

== Personal life ==
In February 2020, Apaokagi became engaged to Abdulaziz Oladimeji (known as Abula) in Namibia, and married on 24 January 2021. The couple welcomed a daughter in 2024.

== Awards and nominations ==
Year	Award	Category	Result	Ref.
2019	The Gage Awards	Best Online Comedian Of The Year	Won	
2020	Nigeria's 25 under 25 awards	Social Entrepreneur	Won	
2020	The Future Awards Africa	Content Creation (YouTubers, Vloggers)	Nominated	
2020	Maya Awards	Skit Maker Of The Year	Nominated	
2020	City People Music Awards	Comedy Act of the Year	Nominated	
2020	The Guardian	100 Most Inspiring Women in Nigeria	Shortlisted	
2021	Net Honours	Most Popular Comedian	Nominated	
2021	JCI TOYP Award	Cultural Achievement	Won	
2022	Africa Magic Viewers' Choice Awards	Best Online Social Content Creator	Nominated	
2022	The Future Awards Africa	Content Creation (YouTubers, Vloggers)	Nominated	
2022	Net Honours	Most Popular Comedian	Nominated	
2023	The Future Awards Africa	Prize for Content Creation	Pending	

== See also ==
- List of Nigerian comedians
