= Editi Effiong =

Nigerian filmmaker, writer, producer, tech entrepreneur, and director

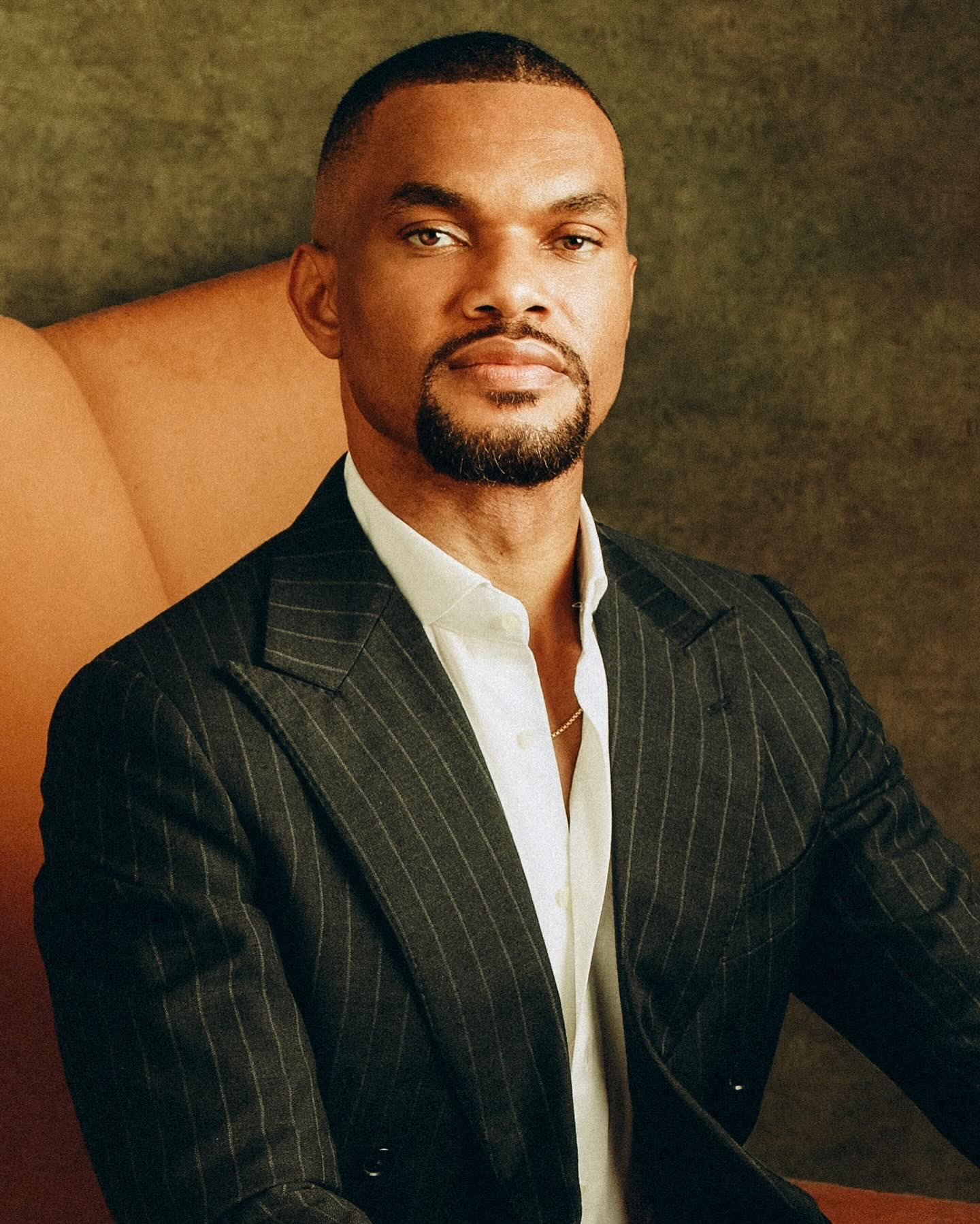
- Education: University of Calabar
- Occupations: Filmmaker, writer, producer, tech entrepreneur, director
- Organization: Anakle Films
- Notable work: Up North,The Black Book
- Website: www.anaklefilms.com

Editi Effiong is a Nigerian filmmaker, writer, producer, tech entrepreneur, and director. His work in Nollywood includes movies like Up North, Day of Destiny, The Setup, Fishbone, and The Black Book. He is the founder and CEO of Anakle Films.

== Early life and education ==
Editi Effiong was born to a father who studied literature and linguistics, which influenced his writing. He had read the entire African Writer Series by the time he turned 12, and knew he would either become a writer or a filmmaker. He spent the early years of his life fighting his father, who opposed his dream of being an artist.

At 14, he authored A Mile from Life, his first novel which was about 300 pages. He started learning coding at 17, but ended up studying Environmental Science at the University of Calabar.

== Career ==
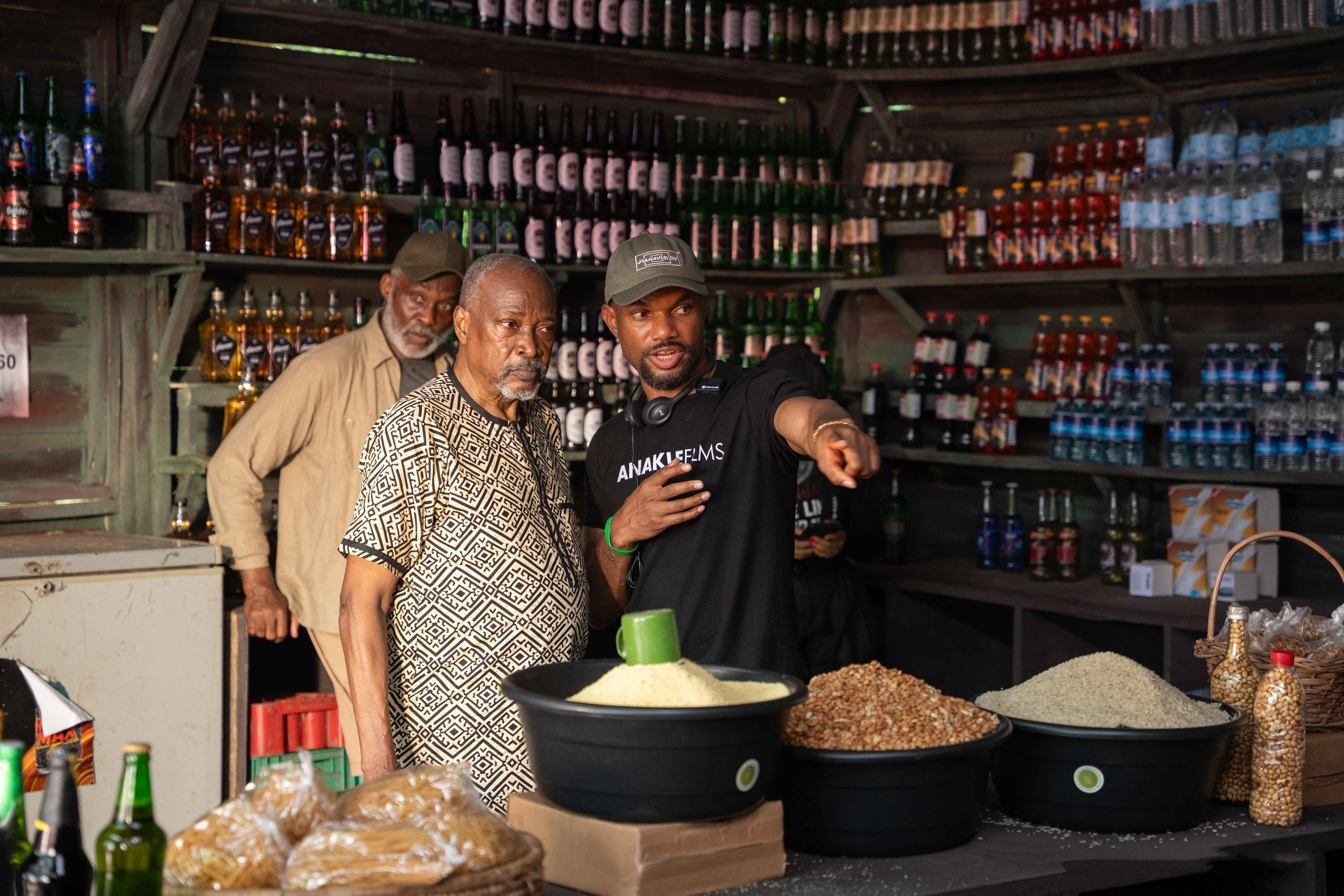
Editi Effiong on the set of The Black Book (2023 film) with Richard Mofe-Damijo

Effiong made his Nollywood debut in 2018 by producing Up North which was directed by Tope Oshin. He released his sophomore feature film The Setup next, and the two films were Anakle Films first two works acquired by Netflix. He followed up by releasing Fishbone, a short film about drug counterfeiting, from the perspective of its victims and perpetrators. The short film was set in one of Lagos slums, Makoko. He executive-produced Day of Destiny in 2021, a sci-fi and time travel Nollywood movie.

Effiong's Up North grossed N94 million at the Box Office, while Day of Destiny and The Set Up grossed N18.6 million and N53 million respectively.

In 2023, Editi Effiong made his directorial debut with The Black Book, an action thriller that made history as the first Nigerian-made movie to land on the Netflix’s global Top 3.

In February 2026, Effiong’s Anakle Films made an announcement that The Black Book 2: Old Scores, a sequel to The Black Book was in the works. The sequel, The Black Book 2: Old Scores, will have Editi Effiong return as writer and director, and will be produced by the Emmy-nominated producer behind Apple TV+’s Severance, Nicholas Weinstock.

== Personal life ==
Effiong lost his youngest brother to cancer, and later lost his son Bibi who was born at 24 weeks in 2013. Before his demise, his son had survived RSV, together with an induced coma, and had spent nine months in NICU.

== Filmography ==
- Up North (2018)
- The Setup (2019)
- Fishbone (2020)
- Day of Destiny (2021)
- The Setup 2 (2022)
- The Black Book (2023)
