= Uche Pedro =

Nigerian entrepreneur

- Born: Uchenna Jennifer Eze; 26 July 1984 (age 42) * Maiduguri, Nigeria
- Other name: Uche Pedro
- Education: Harvard Kennedy School; Ivey Business School
- Alma mater: University of Western Ontario
- Occupation: Media Tech Entrepreneur
- Years active: 2006–present
- Organization: BellaNaija
- Known for: BellaNaija
- Spouse: Bode Pedro
- Children: 2

Uche Pedro (born by Uche Eze; 26 July 1984) is a Nigerian entrepreneur. She is the founder and CEO of BellaNaija, a media tech brand known for entertainment and lifestyle content. Under her leadership, BellaNaija's social footprint has grown through its collective brands - BellaNaija.com, BellaNaija Weddings and BellaNaija Style - to be the largest on the African continent with more than 200 million impressions each month.

== Early life and education ==
Uche was born and raised in Nigeria, where she finished her primary and secondary school education. Uche holds an honors business administration degree from the Ivey Business School, where she graduated with distinction in 2006. In 2020, she graduated from the Harvard Kennedy School with a master's in public administration.

== Career ==
Uche worked for Shell Canada, Cadbury Middle East & Africa Unit in the UK, and Cadbury in Nigeria. In July 2006, she founded BellaNaija.

She claimed the idea for establishing BellaNaija came while she was studying at a university in Canada, where she had a two-week holiday and soon got bored. She said she was inspired to start something that represented the country when she came to Nigeria and observed fashion, entertainment, and business.

Uche is a Fellow of TEDGlobal and a Nigeria Leadership Initiative associate.

Uche realized the potential of what she was building, and she went ahead to organize the business. Taking a step in organizing the business by registering a parent company, BainStone Limited. BainStone Limited is focused on developing and managing innovative and exciting online media content for Africans. The company was among the 50 high potential SMEs chosen and awarded a British Airways, Opportunity Grant.

In 2013, Uche was honored as the British Council International Young Media Entrepreneur of the Year for Nigeria. In 2014 and 2015, Forbes Magazine Online listed Uche among the 30 Most Promising Young Entrepreneurs in Africa. In December 2015, she was listed amongst the Most Influential CEOs of 2015 by Ventures Africa as well as New African Woman's Women of the Year for 2015 and made the QUARTZ’S List of 30 African Innovators.

In 2016, she won the African Blogger of the Year award at the Nickelodeon Kids Choice Awards. In 2017, Uche was invited as a civic leader making a difference around the world for the first-ever Obama Foundation Summit and participated in the Stanford Seed Transformation Programme. In February 2018, Uche featured in the annual OkayAfrica100 Women campaign, celebrating extraordinary women from Africa and the diaspora making waves across a wide array of industries, while driving positive impact in their communities and the world at large. Uche was selected to participate in the 2018 campaign for Bill and Melinda Gates.

Uche Pedro received an invite to The Obama Foundation Summit; a 2-day gathering of about 500 civic leaders from around the world. The BellaNaija team completed the Stanford Seed Transformation Program in 2017, a 12- month program where high potential leaders are challenged to assess their companies’ vision and redefine strategies.

Uche is passionate about impacting her community and nurturing the next generation. She is the founder of #BNDoGood - an impact -driven initiative which consistently supports a wide variety of non-profits and social impact organizations including LEAP Africa, Slum2School, Django Girls, Junior Achievement Nigeria and a long list of others. In 2018, Uche co-founded PVCitizen, an initiative to encourage millennials and Generation Z to register to vote and become active citizens. In November 2018, Uche received an ELOY Award for Innovation/Invention, reserved for a woman who has used her skills to create innovative ways to solve problems and also invented solutions to different challenges. In addition, she was honored with a Frown Awards by UNFPA/UNICEF for her efforts to protect the right of every girl child and contribution to the Abandonment of Female Genital Mutilation (FGM) in Nigeria. Uche served as a host for the TEDxLagos Spotlight event in August 2018.

== Personal life ==
On 16 June 2012, Uche married Bode Pedro, a son of former Deputy Governor of Lagos State, Femi Pedro. She gave birth to a set of twins in April 2015

== Recognition ==
- 2023: World Economic Forum's Young Global Leaders Class of 2023
- 2020 Forbes: "Africa's 50 Most Powerful Women"
- 2019 Speaker BBC "Countering Fake News" Event.
- Speaker 2018 "Bloomberg Africa Business Media Innovators" Forum.
- Keynote Speaker #ADICOMDAYS2018
- OkayAfrica100 Women campaign.
- Gates Foundation/Gates Africa #GatesLetter Campaign.
- 2017 Obama Summit - "Civic Leader Making a Difference around the World"
- Stanford Seed Transformation Programme.
- SME 100 List of 100 most innovative female-owned businesses in Nigeria.
- Nickelodeon Kids Choice Awards - African Blogger of the Year.
- Nigeria's 100 Most Inspiring Women – #YWomen100 #LLA100Women 2016
- Forbes 30 Most Promising Young Entrepreneurs in Africa- 2015
- QUARTZ’S List of 30 African Innovators.
- Ventures Africa - Most Influential CEOs of 2015
- Tiffany Amber Women of Vision Honoree - 2014
- Forbes 30 Most Promising Young Entrepreneurs in Africa - 2014.
- New African Magazine's "50 Trailblazers under 50 Made in Africa" List.
- Forty-Forty: A Compendium of Young African Legends by Ventures Africa.
- New African Woman Magazine - 10 Young Nigerian Women to Watch.
- Nigeria Leadership Initiative (NLI) Future Leaders Seminar.
- TEDGlobal Fellow.

== Awards ==
Year	Award	Prize	Result	Ref
2010	The Future Awards	Young Person of the Year	Nominated	
2010	The Future Awards	The Best Use of Technology	Nominated	
2010	African Fashion Week	Outstanding Contribution to Fashion Communication Award	Won	
2012	FAB Awards	Online Publication of the Year	Won	
2013	The Future Awards	Young Media Entrepreneur of the Year	Won	
2013	TW Magazine Phoenix Gala Awards	Business Protege Award	Won	
2013	The British Council	Young Media Entrepreneur Award	Won	
2014	WIE Africa Conference	WIE Next Generation Leader Award	Won	
2015	Creative Industries Awards	Creative Industries Awards for Bloggers	Won	
2016	Kids' Choice Awards	Best African Blogger	Won	
2016	La Mode Awards	BellaNaija Style - Outstanding Recognition for contribution to the Fashion and Entertainment Industry	Won	
2016	Nigerian Fashion and Style Awards	BellaNaija Style - Fashion Support	Nominated	
2016	African Entertainment Award	BellaNaija - Most Popular Site	Won	
2016	Beatz Awards	BellaNaija -Best Blog	Won	
2017	APPOEMN's TEIC	BellaNaija Weddings - Wedding/Event blog of the Year Award	Won	
2017	Corporate Communications Award	BellaNaija - Special Media Recognition	Won	
2017	Beatz Awards	BellaNaija - Best Blog	Won	
2017	Glitz Style Award	BellaNaija Style - Fashion Blog of the Year (Africa)	Won	
2018	Beatz Awards	BellaNaija - Best Blog	Won	
2018	ELOY Awards	Innovation/Invention Award	Won	
2018	The Frown Awards 2018 by UNFPA/UNICEF	For efforts to protect the right of every girl child and contribution to the Abandonment of Female Genital Mutilation (FGM) in Nigeria	Won	
2018	Spice Lifestyle Honours	Social and Digital Media Person of the Year	Won	

== See also ==
- List of Nigerian bloggers
- List of Igbo people
