= Jumoke Dada =

Nigerian entrepreneur

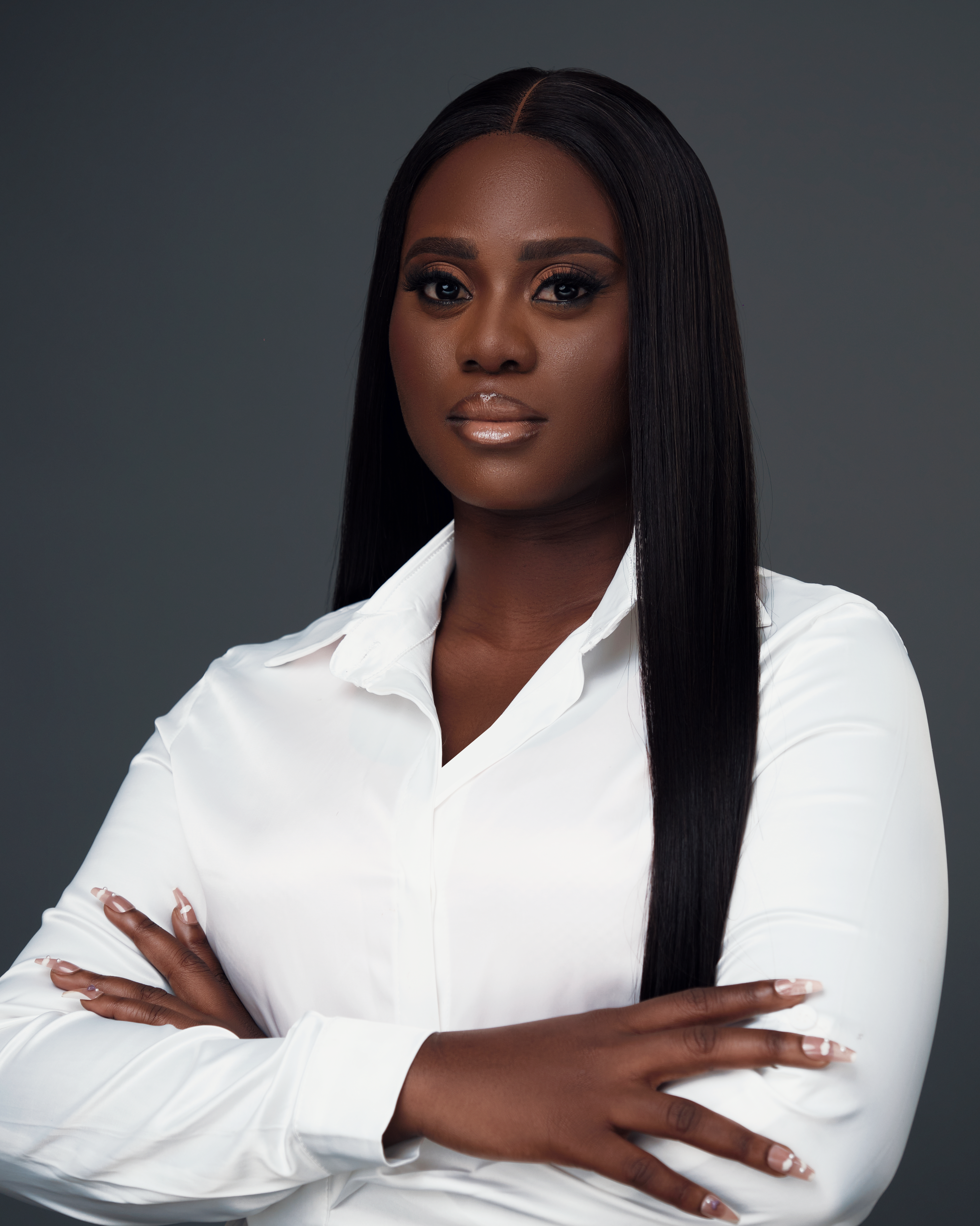
- Founder of Taeillo
- Education: University of Lagos
- Occupation: Entrepreneur
- Years active: 2016 - present
- Organization: Taeillo
- Awards: Diamond Bank Building Entrepreneur Award
- Website: dadajumoke.com

Jumoke Dada is a Nigerian entrepreneur and the founder of Nigerian furniture brand Taeillo.

== Career ==
Jumoke Dada began her career working as an intern at various interior design, architectural, and furniture manufacturing companies in Nigeria. By 26, Jumoke Dada had grown Taeillo to a multi-million dollar Brand, an e-commerce furniture business in Nigeria that enhanced customer experience by allowing them to envision furniture designs through augmented reality and virtual reality.

In December 2022, Jumoke helped raised $2.5 million for her start up company. The company has raised over $3 million across three funding rounds, including an initial $365,000.

== Awards and honours ==
In 2017, She received the She Leads Africa Accelerator Award for young female-led businesses leveraging technology to create better African Communities. In 2017, she was named one of 1000 entrepreneurs by The Tony Elumelu Foundation and awarded the Diamond Bank Building Entrepreneur Award. In 2020, She was featured in TechCabals Women in Tech and Elle Decoration South Africa 2021.

Jumoke Dada was also featured as a Milestone Maker of the Fall 2020 cohort of the Nasdaq Entrepreneurial Center on the Nasdaq Tower at the New York Times Square. She is a Pritzker Fellow and was among the '100 Most Inspiring Women in Nigeria' in 2021.

Jumoke Dada has also been a speaker at various national conferences, including the Nigerian Energy Forum 2021 and TEDx AjaoEstate 2021. She has been featured in a BBC World News interview talking about the challenges facing young entrepreneurs in Africa.
