= Hilda Baci =

Nigerian chef and actress

- Born: Hilda Effiong Bassey; September 20, 1995 (age 31); Akwa Ibom, Nigeria
- Occupation: Chef
- Known for: former Guinness World Records holder for World's Longest Cooking Marathon
- Mother: Lynda Ndukwe

Hilda Effiong Bassey (born 20 September 1995), known as Hilda Baci, is a Nigerian chef, restaurateur, actor, and a two-time Guinness World Record winner. She previously held the Guinness World Record for marathon cooking (cook-athon) with 93 hours 11 minutes in May 2023. Later that year, Irish chef Alan Fisher surpassed the record with 119 hours, 57 minutes. In August 2021, she won the Jollof Faceoff competition. In September 2025, Guinness World Records confirmed her feat for cooking the largest quantity of Jollof rice at once, breaking another world record in conjunction with Gino.

== Early life and career ==
Hilda Effiong Bassey was born on 20 September 1995, and she is from the Nsit Ubium Local Government Area of Akwa Ibom State. At the age of five, she moved to Abuja with her family and assisted her mother in running a restaurant opposite the Ministry of Defence office after school. She graduated with a degree in sociology from Madonna University, Okija, Anambra State. She was the host of Dine on a Budget, a television show that airs on Pop Central TV.

Baci embarked on a culinary education program, drawing inspiration from her mother, a culinary chef.

== Guinness World record ==
In March 2023, Baci announced she would be attempting the record for the longest cooking marathon. The record was previously held by Lata Tondon whose cooking marathon lasted for 87 hours, 45 minutes in 2019.

On 11 May 2023, she started her " Cook-a-thon " record attempt. She broke the record on 15 May 2023. On Monday, May 15, 2023, at exactly 7:45 am, Hilda broke the record for the longest cooking marathon by any individual hitting 87 hours 50 minutes above the previous record holder in 2019. On Tuesday, May 16, 2023, Guinness World Records spokesperson released an official statement on its website saying: "We are aware of the record attempt and are looking forward to receiving the evidence for our Records Management Team to review before we can confirm the record is official."

To set a new record for the longest cooking marathon, Hilda was originally set to cook for 96 hours but later extended her goal to a 100-hour cooking marathon. High-profile Nigerians who visited Hilda include Governor of Lagos State, Babajide Olusola Sanwo-Olu; Lead Pastor of Harvester International, Bolaji Idowu, Nigerian award-winning singer, Tiwa Savage, Tim Godfrey, Ice Prince. Then-Vice President of Nigeria, Yemi Osinbajo, also called to cheer Hilda up during the cook-a-thon. Hilda received a huge support fan base from Nigerians who trooped to the venue of the cooking competition, while others kept trending her name on Social media. After review of videos and evidence, Guinness World Records confirmed that Baci had broken the record longest cooking marathon (individual), with a time of 93 hours 11 minutes. Her record reportedly sparked a wave of endurance record attempts across Nigeria.

In November 2023, Hilda Baci lost her Guinness World Record title for the longest cooking marathon by an individual to Alan Fisher, an Irish chef. Fisher cooked for 119 hours and 57 minutes, surpassing Baci's previous record by more than 24 hours. Fisher also broke the record for the longest baking marathon (individual) with 47 hours and 21 minutes. Baci congratulated Fisher on his achievement and said she was proud of him for breaking her record.

On 12 September 2025, Baci achieved another Guinness World Record during the World Jollof Festival in Lagos, Nigeria. She prepared asun jollof rice over a nine-hour period, producing 8,780 kilograms (19,356 lb 9 oz) of the dish. Guinness World Records confirmed the feat as the largest quantity of jollof rice cooked at once, recognising Baci's achievement later that month

== Filmography ==
Year	Movie	Role
2020	Dreamchaser	Rihanna
2021	A Walk on Water	Annie
2023	Mr & Mrs Robert	Hilda

== Awards and nominations ==
Year	Award	Category	Recipient	Result	Ref
2023	The Future Awards Africa	Young Person of the Year	Herself	Won	
