= Lata Tondon =

Indian chef

- Born: 15 April 1980 (age 46); Rewa, Madhya Pradesh, India
- Known for: First woman to hold Guinness World Record for marathon cooking
- Culinary career
- Award won: Guinness World Records for marathon cooking
- Website: instagram.com/cheflatatondon

Lata Tondon (born 15 April 1980) is an Indian chef from Madhya Pradesh who is the former Guinness World Record holder for marathon cooking. She set the record in September 2019 after completing her cooking marathon in 87 hours, 45 minutes and was later surpassed by Nigerian chef Hilda Baci with 93 hours, 11 minutes.

== Background ==
Lata Tondon was born on 15 April 1980 in Rewa, a city in the north-eastern part of Madhya Pradesh state in India. She started cooking when she was young and found inspiration in her grandfather. According to the Hindustan Times, she credits her mother and mother-in-law for teaching her how to cook and she states that they were key players in her development. Tondon was educated at the Chef Academy of London in the United Kingdom and has worked with French chef Claude Bosi and American-British television chef Jun Tanaka.

== Career ==
In 2018 Tondon was the winner of International Indian Chef of the Year. In 2019 she set a Guinness World Record for marathon cooking. She was the first woman in the world to hold the record, and the first female chef to enter the Guinness World Record Book. She cooked for 87 hours, 45 minutes non-stop to set the record.

Tondon has worked both in India and London where she studied. She is also a TEDx speaker. She has focussed on promoting the regional cuisine of India; she also attempts to expand on the flavours and techniques of those dishes. Tondon also attempts to achieve zero food waste cooking and promotes healthy eating.

== Honours ==
Tondon has been honoured with several awards, which include recognitions from the Asia Book of Records, India Book of Records, Indo-china Book of Records, Vietnam Book of Records, Laos Book of Records, and Nepal Book of Records among others.
