= Femi Leye =

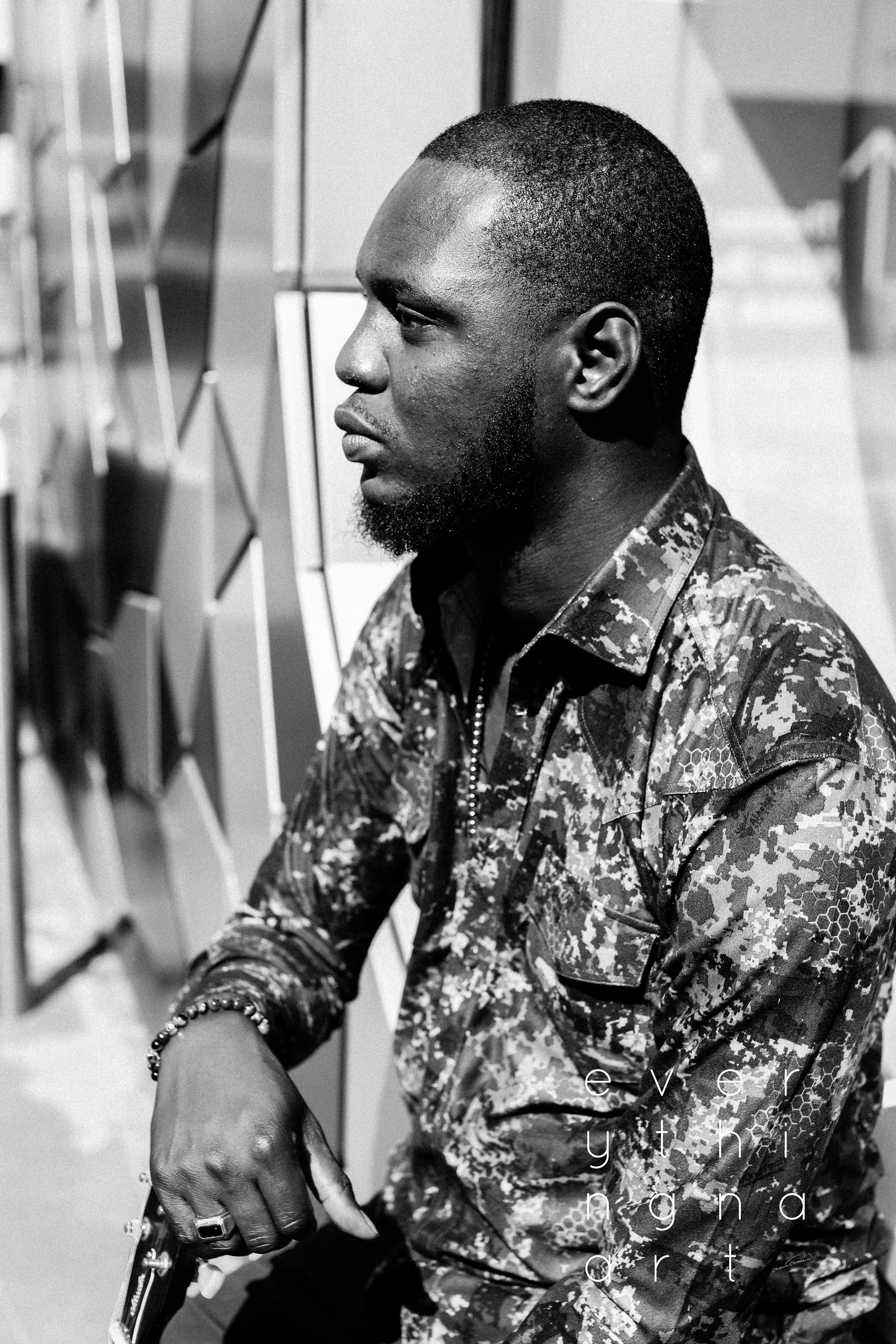

Background information
- Born: Oluwafemi Abolade Leye; 7 September 1989 (age 36); Ikeja, Lagos State, Nigeria
- Genres: African Music; Pop; Soul; Jazz; Rhythm and Blues; World Music Yoruba Music
- Occupations: Guitarist; Singer-songwriter; Multi-instrumentalist; Record Producer; Composer
- Instruments: Guitar; Piano; Bass; Drums; Percussions
- Years active: 2008–present
- Label: Femi Leye Entertainment
- Website: femileye.com

Oluwafemi Abolade Leye, known professionally as Femi Leye, is a Nigerian guitarist, singer, songwriter, record producer, and composer. His music is a hybrid of African ethnic sounds, Contemporary Soul, Jazz, Rhythm and Blues, Funk and Yoruba Music.

== Early life and education ==
Femi was born in Ogba, Lagos to the family of Francis Babatunde Ogunleye and Grace Folake Ogunleye. He has two siblings Dare Ogunleye and Tosin Akpoguma (Nee Ogunleye)

He graduated from Federal Polytechnic, Ilaro, with a degree in Food science and Technology.

== Career ==
He grew up listening to his father's vinyls of artists like King Sunny Ade, Ebenezer Obey, and Fela Anikulapo-Kuti. At age 14, Femi taught himself how to play the guitar, with heavy influences from musical legends like Jimmy Dludlu, Lionel Loueke, George Benson, Norman Brown and Wes Montgomery.

After graduating from college, he worked with different artistes in Nigeria in the studio and on stage. He had a residency with his band Femi Leye Trio at Eko Hotel & Suites.

He went on to score musicals and spoken word performances by Titilope Sonuga and Wanawana. He also had production credits and played for artists such as Youssou N'Dour, Angélique Kidjo, Salif Keita, Akon, Don Jazzy, Tiwa Savage, Adekunle Gold, Di'Ja, Reminisce, Chidinma Ekile, Burnaboy, Juls, and Brymo.

=== 2010–2011: Career beginnings ===
Femi produced his first song, "Irawo Owuro", which means "Morning Star". It is a contemporary jazz song with heavy African sound influences.

=== 2014–2015: Ekaabo and Ibukun ===
In 2014, he released his first official single titled, "Smile", which received massive airplay from popular radio stations. He will later release his debut studio album in August 2015, titled Ekaabo, which means "Welcome" in Yoruba. The album is a 10-song project of African infused Contemporary Jazz and Funk.

In 2015, he teamed up with Chopstix and released a joint project titled "Ibukun"

=== 2017–2018 ===
In September 2017, Femi released the album Ekaabo Live which was recorded from The Ekaabo Concert at the Lagoon Restaurant, Victoria Island, Lagos on June 3, 2017.

In June 2017, with his friend Adekunle Gold he started the band The 79th Element. The band has toured across Africa, Europe and the U.S.

He performed at the 2018 AMVCA Awards and presented a speech at TEDxLagos.

The Highlife Ep was released in October 2018 a collection of original highlife tunes written, produced and performed by Femi Leye.

The project went on to be used as soundtrack to Ndanitv's Skinny girl in transit.

=== 2019–present ===
In July 2019, he released his second studio album Femi Leye The Album to critical acclaim. He went on to perform to a 2500 audience at sky theatre Minnesota, USA opening for Congolese Artiste Fally Ipupa. He had his first headline concert at Norwood Club, New York selling out tickets a day before the show.

In September 2019, he collaborated with Reekadobanks on his hit record "RORA" and also did so on the acoustic version of the song.

Femi Leye performed at the 2020 AMVCA Nominees and sponsors party

In January 2021, he released Pendulum The Ep to Critical acclaim, the project is a fusion of Lofi, Jazz, Afrobeat and Hiphop with Femi Leye producing the entire project. He partnered with StageIt, a virtual live concert company in Los Angeles California with StreamAfrica for a virtual concert of live music and Live art alongside his wife Iniabasi Leye. They both appeared on Timesquare Billboard in New York City, USA.

Pendulum Vol 2 will be released June 25th, 2021.

== Personal life ==
Femi is married to Iniabasi Leye, an artist, art therapist and broadcaster. They have 3 children together.

== Discography ==
- Ibukun
- Ekaabo
- Ekaabo Live
- The Highlife Ep
- Femi Leye The Album
- Pendulum
- Pendulum Vol 2
- Pendulum Vol 3
- Pendulum Vol 4

== Awards and nominations ==
Year	Award ceremony	Prize	Recipient/Nominated work	Result
2016	Beatz Awards	Best Afrojazz Producer	Won	

== See also ==
- List of Nigerian musicians
