= Olumide Soyombo =

Nigerian entrepreneur and venture capitalist

- Born: September 1983 (age 43); Nigeria
- Occupations: Entrepreneur, venture capitalist
- Known for: Co-founder of Bluechip Technologies

Olumide Soyombo is a Nigerian entrepreneur and venture capitalist. He is the co-founder of Bluechip Technologies, and the co-founder of Voltron Capital.

== Early life and education ==
Soyombo was born in September 1983 in Nigeria. As a child, he aspired to be a medical doctor, but his interest shifted towards technology after being introduced to computers and the internet.

Soyombo received a BSc in systems engineering from the University of Lagos in 2005. He also holds a master's degree in business and information technology from Aston University in Birmingham, England.

== Career ==
=== Bluechip Technologies ===
In 2008, Soyombo co-founded Bluechip Technologies with Kazeem Tewogbade. The company provides data warehousing and business analytics solutions for banks, telecommunication companies, and insurance firms. Soyombo's father provided the initial seed investment of US $40,000. Bluechip Technologies has worked with companies such as Oracle, Microsoft, and several banks across Africa.

=== Angel Investing ===
Soyombo began angel investing in 2014. He initially launched Leadpath as a vehicle to invest in local tech startups, but later transitioned to investing individually. By 2024, he had invested in startups like Paystack (later acquired by Stripe), PiggyVest, TeamApt (now Moniepoint Inc.), Lemonade Finance, and AltSchool Africa.

=== Voltron Capital ===
In 2021, Soyombo co-founded Voltron Capital with Abe Choi. Voltron Capital is a venture capital firm focused on pre-seed and seed investments in tech startups across Africa. The firm's portfolio primarily includes startups in Nigeria, Kenya, South Africa, and North Africa. After launching its first fund in 2022, Voltron invested in 53 startups that year.
