= Laila Johnson-Salami =

Nigerian Journalist

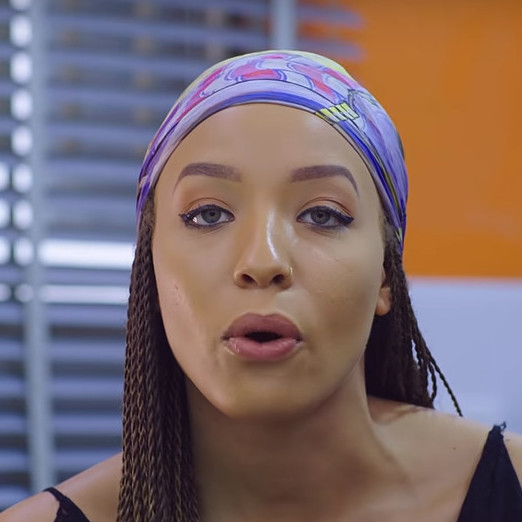
- Born: 3 December 1996 (age 29); Ibadan, Nigeria
- Citizenship: Nigerian
- Education: Degree in politics
- Alma mater: University of Westminster
- Occupation: Journalist
- Employer: Arise News
- Parents: Abayomi Salami (father); Diana Yeside Johnson (mother)

Laila Johnson-Salami (born 3 December 1996) is a Nigerian journalist. She has worked with Spice TV, Nigeria Info FM, Wazobia Max TV and as a correspondent at Arise News. In 2022, she received the inaugural UNDP/UN Women International Women's Day Award for Media and Entertainment category and was nominated for the 2022 Gatefield People's Journalist for Africa Award. She is known for her work in promoting gender equality, youth empowerment, climate action and social inclusion. She is a co-founder of We Rise Initiative, a nonprofit organization focused on women empowerment and a founding member of Feminist Coalition.

== Early life and career ==
Johnson-Salami was born in Ibadan, Nigeria to Abayomi Salami and Diana Yeside Johnson. Her grandfather, Lekan Salami was a chief, businessman, sports administrator and politician and her aunt, Caroline Lee Johnson is a British actress. Laila was raised in Nigeria and the UK where she received her education and earned a bachelor's degree in politics and international relations from the University of Westminster.

In 2016, she co-founded We Rise Initiative, an NGO focused on women empowerment. She returned to Nigeria from the UK in 2017. In 2018, Johnson-Salami co-hosted a show, On the Couch with Falz and Laila, where they interviewed presidential aspirants for the 2019 elections. In May 2019, Johnson-Salami joined Arise News as a co-host of The Morning Show, and later co-hosted the afternoon programme News Day. Since 2021, Johnson-Salami has worked as a field correspondent at Arise News reporting on the environment, healthcare and international affairs. In 2021, Johnson-Salami produced and presented Go Wild, a wildlife conservation series aired on Arise News in partnership with the international NGO WildAid. In 2022, the UNDP/UN Women International Women's Day Award committee described her as "a rising star in media and journalism who is changing the narrative around gender equality, youth empowerment, climate action and social inclusion, one conversation at a time."

She is a founding member of the Feminist Coalition, an organisation championing equality for Nigerian women.

== Awards ==
- UNDP/UN Women International Women's Day Award for Media and Entertainment (2022)
- Gatefield People's Journalist for Africa Award (nominee, 2022)
- Future Awards Prize for Journalism (nominee, 2021)
