= Taeillo =

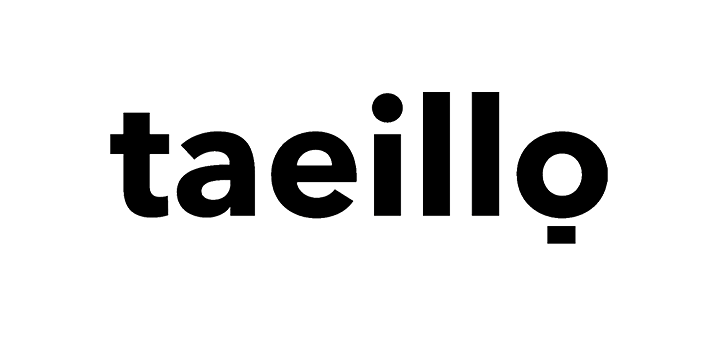
- Company type: Private
- Industry: Furniture E commerce, Retail
- Founded: 2018
- Key people: Jumoke Dada (CEO)
- Website: taeillo.com

Taeillo is a furniture company specialising in African-inspired designs.

== History ==
The company was founded by Jumoke Dada in 2018.

In December 2018, Taeillo ran an exhibit to showcase new designers of furniture, textile and lighting.

In February 2020, Taeillo set up an augmented reality exhibition at Lagos social media week.

In October 2021, Taeillo held an exhibition at Eko Design series during Lagos Design Week.

In June 2022, Taeillo was featured on CNN's Inside Africa.

== Funding ==
Taeillo raised about $3 million in funding over three rounds, starting from a $365, 000 pre-seed round in 2019. Its first round was backed by Montane Capital, Co-Creation Hub (CcHub) and B-Knight. In January 2021, CcHub added another $150,000 investment. In December 2022 the company raised $2.5 million in seed funding from Lagos-based investor Aruwa Capital Management, to help it scale its existing operations in Kenya.
