= List of Rise of the Teenage Mutant Ninja Turtles characters =

This is a list of characters from Rise of the Teenage Mutant Ninja Turtles. It is an American animated series based on the eponymous characters. It premiered on Nickelodeon in the United States on July 20, 2018 and concluded on August 7, 2020.

== Main characters ==
- Raphael (voiced by Omar Benson Miller) is a 15-16-year-old (17-18 in the movie) alligator snapping turtle and the oldest brother of the group; before the second-season finale, he was the team's leader, and he informally named themselves the "Mad Dogs". Raphael formerly wields two tonfa in a battle that can amplify his own physical strength with red mystical energy constructs and he had been given new sais in the season two four-part finale with the ability to make clones of himself made from the same energy. He has a habit of speaking in the third person in battle. Raph has numerous catchphrases: "Jumpin' Jackflash" when surprised, "Hot Soup" as a battle cry and "Power Punch-Jitsu" when using his tonfas.
- Leonardo (voiced by Ben Schwartz) is a 14-15-year-old (16-17 in the movie) red-eared slider, and the team's current leader as of the Season 2 finale. He is known as the trickster of the group and thinks that his one-liners will "fire up the team", but is shown to have actual encouraging charisma. Leo wields an ōdachi sword in a battle that can open portals, but he had been given new katanas in the season two finale that allows him to teleport himself or others. Despite coming off as arrogant, Leo has an insecure side and feels a need to always be right. By the end of the four-part "Finale" episodes, Splinter makes Leo the new leader of the group.
- Donatello (voiced by Josh Brener) is a 14-15-year-old (16-17 in the movie) soft shelled turtle, is the "genius of the team" and relishes praise from others. He has a sidekick drone named S.H.E.L.L.D.O.N. along with many battle shells that he makes to help him in battle because of his species. He rejects claiming a magical weapon like his brothers and instead wields a high-tech version of his traditional bō staff in a battle that can transform into a multitude of weapons like drills or a rocket-powered hammer. This was destroyed near the end of season two and was replaced with a mystic bō staff with magic energy versions of his gadgets. The new mystic staff could also link up with his technological attachments.
- Michelangelo (voiced by Brandon Mychal Smith) is a 13-14-year-old (15-16 in the movie) box turtle who is the youngest jokester-prankster brother. He is an affectionate and sensitive artist, and is also called the wild card of the group. Mikey wields a kusari-fundo in a battle that can become a fire spirit, but he had been given a new set of nunchaku in the season two finale with the ability to extend to great length and control will.

== Allies ==
- Hamato Yoshi / Splinter (voiced by Eric Bauza) is a mutant gray rat who is the Ninja Turtles' sensei and father. He is fond of watching the projects of Lou Jitsu, milk, and cake. His training of the Turtles manifests in copying and watching Lou Jitsu tapes, which is more effective than the brothers expected. In "The Evil League of Mutants" and "Shadow of Evil", Splinter is revealed to be Hamato Yoshi as he neglected to carry out the Hamato Clan's mission in preventing Shredder's return by working in Hollywood under the stage name of "Lou Jitsu", and in the four-part "Finale" revealed he resented his family's mission to it forcing his mother to leave him while he was young. He acquired a large fanbase during his career including Baron Draxum, who used his genetic sample to create the Turtles, and some members of the Foot Clan. The flashback sequences of "Many Unhappy Returns" and "Goyles, Goyles, Goyles" reveal that Yoshi was abducted by Big Mama to fight in the Battle Nexus and was later mutated after constantly being bitten by a rat, while Draxum used his DNA to create the Turtles.
- April O'Neil (voiced by Kat Graham) is a human friend of the Ninja Turtles, she has already known them for five years before the beginning of the show and the turtles look to her as an older sister figure. April is a fun-loving virtuous, if tomboyish, girl with glasses who is constantly looking for a job to support herself which constantly goes wrong. "Hypno: Part Deux!" shows that despite her bravado, she has a hard time making friends at school and is nervous about high school gatherings. When fighting, she also wields any blunt weaponry she can find, mostly a baseball bat. In "Warren & Hypno, Sitting in a Tree", it is revealed that April knows who Warren Stone is as she was part of a fan club dedicated to him called the Stoneheads, and she is 16 years old (later 18 years old in the film).
- Baron Draxum (voiced by John Cena in season one, Roger Craig Smith in season two) is a maroon-skinned Caprinae of indeterminate species Yōkai warrior and alchemist from the Hidden City who can manipulate giant purple tentacle-like vines to grab objects, enemies, or as a means of transportation. As the self-proclaimed protector of all Yōkai, Draxum seeks to mutate humanity to avert a prophecy predicting the destruction of the Yōkai. An incident amidst an earlier attempt to turn humanity into Yōkai led to the creation of the Teenage Mutant Ninja Turtles while causing Hamato Yoshi's transition into Splinter, attempting to win the former to his side before joining forces with the Foot Clan to reassemble the Kuroi Yōroi and revive Shredder. In "How to Make Enemies and Bend People to Your Will", Draxum exploits a loophole in the Foot's rules to becomes its leader through tactics that enable him to gain a shard of the Kuroi Yōroi that the Foot Lieutenant and Foot Brute failed to acquire. In the episode "End Game", Draxum equips the restored Kuroi Yōroi armor intending to destroy humanity once and for all. The Foot Lieutenant and Foot Brute address him as Shredder, but he rejects the title, confused with the name "Shredder". Due to a Jupiter Jim action figure being wedged in a hole in the back of the helmet, the Turtles managed to attack that part and cause the armor to fall off of Draxum, though the armor is revived after siphoning some of Draxum's life force, degrading his body and weakening his powers considerably. Draxum manages to escape through a portal created by the Foot Recruit. In "Repairin' the Baron", Mikey takes in a weakened Draxum and teaches him to tolerate humans with Raph's help. After saving a mother and daughter from the Ferris wheel during Garm and Freki's attempt to capture him at Albeartoland while losing his mask in the process, and slowly starting to regain his lost power, he starts to tolerate humans. Raph and Mikey get Draxum a job working at the cafeteria at April's school.
- Cassandra "Casey" Jones (voiced by Zelda Williams) - Cassandra Jones is a member of the Foot Clan who is an gender-bent interpretation of Casey Jones. She is initially only known as the Foot Recruit. In "Battle Nexus: New York", Cassandra was placed on a cruise by Shredder so that Big Mama can make New York into the Battle Nexus. She was the one who found that Big Mama was controlling the Shredder using a control device on him and its associated magic ring. When she claims the magic ring, Cassandra controls the Shredder into destroying the Grand Nexus Hotel as she shouts the Foot Clan's name. When the Shredder regained his power of speech, he promoted Cassandra to the rank of Foot General and had her perform the ritual to drain Splinter's essence. After witnessing Shredder's uncaring for his followers, Cassandra defected to the Turtles' side and helped to defeat Shredder while revealing her true name to them. The film Rise of the Teenage Mutant Ninja Turtles: The Movie revealed that she is the mother of Casey Jones.
- Casey Jones II (voiced by Haley Joel Osment) is Cassandra Jones' son from the future who appears in Rise of the Teenage Mutant Ninja Turtles: The Movie and adheres more to the character's traditional design. He was trained by Leonardo, who sends him back in time to stop the invasion of the Krang. In battle, he wields a hockey stick with a chainsaw attached to one end.
- Hamato Karai (voiced by Gwendoline Yeo) is the founder of the Hamato Clan and the biological daughter of Oroku Saki. After her father became the Shredder, she created the new Hamato Clan and ultimately defeated Shredder at the cost of her being imprisoned in the Twilight Realm with him, since then her clan has been preventing the foot from reviving their master. She ultimately was freed by the Turtles, who call her "Gram-Gram," and managed to channel her essence into April's body to give the Turtles the rightful ninja skills their required through April.
- Mayhem / Agent 64 is a kitten-like creature with short-range teleportation abilities that becomes April's pet. It is an agent that worked for the Council of Heads against Baron Draxum and was sent to monitor him.
- Todd Capybara (voiced by Thurop Van Orman) is a friendly mutant capybara and selfless charitable proprietor of Cuddles Cakes Puppy Rescue on Long Island. In exchange for Todd giving up his RV, Michelangelo and Donatello build a new type of residence for Todd and his rescue puppies.
- Señor Hueso (voiced by Eric Bauza impersonating Antonio Banderas) is a skeleton who uses his own left arm for a cane. He is the doorman and manager of the pizza parlor called Run of the Mill Pizza in New York's mystical Undercity. In "Portal Jacked", Senor Hueso has the brother named Capitán Piel. Señor Hueso's name is Spanish for "Mr. Bone".
- Stanley / Bullhop (voiced by Dave Foley) is a Canadian immigrant and bellhop who works at the Grand Nexus Hotel that was actually a front for Big Mama's Battle Nexus. After being attacked by Oozesquitos, Stanley is turned into a mutant bull and flees the hotel. After the Turtles try to make up for their mistake, he becomes their friend and develops advanced dancing skills. This character is a homage to Jerry Lewis' role in the film The Bellboy.
- DIGG are a trio of girl rock musicians longing for their breakthrough. Turned into a mutant burrowing animal by the Oozesquitos during one of their gigs, they attempt a misguided scheme to win themselves an attentive debut audience by targeting the different pizzerias. With the Turtles' aid, they finally become an attraction as pizzeria musicians while also reuniting a family of pizza makers.
  - Prairie Dog (voiced by E. G. Daily) is a mutant prairie dog who is the group's lead singer and guitarist.
  - Ground Hog (voiced by Betsy Sodaro) is a mutant groundhog who is the group's dig-obsessed drummer. She tends to say "dig" when she is burrowing.
  - Honey Badger (voiced by E. G. Daily) is a mutant honey badger who is the group's secondary guitarist. She is the strongest of the group.
- Sunita (voiced by Kody Kavitha) is a slimy Yōkai that can explode and reassemble at will. She can assume a human form thanks to a special amulet. At the time of meeting April and the Turtles, Sunita was wearing metal boots that turned out to be a part of the Kuroi Yoroi, leading her to be targeted by the Foot.
- Frankenfoot (voiced by Rob Paulsen) is a patchwork Origami Ninja put together by Raph as a sparring partner. He becomes a permanent member of the team, even earning a Mad Dog insignia courtesy of Mikey.
- S.H.E.L.L.D.O.N. (voiced by Greg Cipes) is an A.I. invention that is devoted to its creator Donnie causing a disgruntled Raph, Leo, and Mikey to reprogram and thus inadvertently turning it against their brother. Donnie was able to fix it and it occasionally fights alongside them in the form of a drone.
- Piebald (voiced by Chelsea Peretti) is a goldfish that is owned by Splinter and was accidentally flushed down the toilet by Leo months ago. After traversing through the sewers and nearly being eaten by Trash Wizard, Piebald swallowed an Oozesquito and was mutated, gaining camouflage abilities. Piebald works with Splinter to teach the Turtles a lesson about the dangers of lying.
- Gentry (voiced by Evanna Lynch) is a young Yōkai witch from the Hidden City's Witch Town district who befriends April and (though much less) Donatello.
- Hamato Atsuko (voiced by Keiko Agena) is Hamato Yoshi's late mother who died in her duty to her family's destiny to contain the Shredder while Yoshi was still a child. She was Karai's descendant.

== Villains ==
- Foot Clan are a ninja clan seeking to resurrect the Shredder and take over New York City. They can make origami ninjas out of paper and have the power of teleportation through hidden gateways. In "How to Make Enemies and Bend People to Your Will", Baron Draxum took command over the Foot after exploiting a loophole in the clan's rulings of leadership. In the episodes "End Game" and "Many Unhappy Returns", it is revealed that the Foot were manipulating Draxum into donning the Kuroi Yōroi so it could drain his life force to reassemble and resurrect Shredder.
  - Oroku Saki / Shredder (voiced by Hoon Lee) is the original leader of the Foot Clan. 500 years ago, Saki was possessed by the demonic Kuroi Yōroi armor, which consumed his soul, after making a deal with a powerful Oni (Krang) to forge the armor. Shredder terrorized Japan until he was defeated by the Hamato Clan, with his armor being broken into pieces and scattered across the world to prevent his return. The Foot and Baron Draxum began seeking out the fragments of the Kuroi Yōroi to reassemble it and resurrect the Shredder, the latter being tricked into wearing the armor so his life force can be siphoned. Shredder reconstitutes himself after the Turtles break the armor off of Draxum, but becomes a feral beast due to something that went wrong with his resurrection. After regaining his intelligence, Shredder attempts to drain Splinter's essence. With help from the Hamato Clan, the Turtles vanquish the Kuroi Yōroi, destroying the Shredder persona. Oroku Saki survives and is returned to the Hamato clan.
  - Foot Lieutenant (voiced by Rob Paulsen) is a leading officer of the Foot Clan.
  - Foot Brute (voiced by Maurice LaMarche) is a buff member of the Foot Clan who works alongside Foot Lieutenant.
  - Jocelyn (voiced by Cree Summer) is a Foot Initiate who gains the mark of the Foot in "How to Make Enemies and Bend People to Your Will". Foot Recruit claimed to Baron Draxum that she got the mark because her parents are "big donors".
  - Foot Soldiers (various voices) are an army of ninjas that are associated with the Foot Clan.
  - Origami Ninjas – Ninjas made out of paper that is created by Foot Lieutenant and Foot Brute.
- Krang are parasitic aliens who invaded Earth a long time ago but were defeated and banished to another realm. When the Foot Clan came under attack, the Krang gave Oroku Saki the Dark Armor, which eventually consumed his soul and turned him into Shredder. Only three of them managed to survive by the time they were freed, one was their leader who was banished again by Leo, the other was a female warrior with a temper who was captured by humans and the third one who's mute was in charge of bringing the Technodrome and controlling it who was apparently destroyed with it.
  - Krang One (voiced by Jim Pirri) is the leader of the Krang.
  - Krang Two (voiced by Toks Olagundoye) is a sadistic and temperamental member of the Krang.
  - Krang Three - A silent member of the Krang.
- Huginn (voiced by Timothy Simons) and Muninn (voiced by Sam Richardson) are two small gargoyles with retractable wings that are often seen sitting on Baron Draxum's shoulders. Huginn has a frog-like body and a cat-like head and tail while Muninn has a frog-like body and a tapir-like head. Their names and presence as Draxum's companions are a play on Odin's ravens Huginn and Muninn.
- Garm and Freki (both voiced by Fred Tatasciore) are two guardsman warriors who work for Baron Draxum and are experts at armed combat. They can also ride giant demon-like dogs. In "Repairin' the Baron", Garm and Freki are offered forgiveness from the Council of Heads if they bring Draxum to the Hidden City to stand trial for his crimes. They are later mentioned by Draxum to Raph and Mikey to be bounty hunters who work for whoever has the most money. Their names are a play on the wolf monster Garmr and Odin's wolf Freki.
- Oozesquitos are a swarm of mutant mosquitoes that are often used by Baron Draxum. They store mutagen in their abdomens to inject anyone they bite which turn them into mutants.
- Mutant Silverfish are a bunch of mutant silverfish. If they are attacked, the Mutant Silverfish will split into smaller silverfish that would later aggregate back to their original state.
- Rupert Swaggart / Meat Sweats (voiced by Johnny Rotten) is a former celebrity chef who was turned into a mutant domestic pig after being stung by an Oozesquito while holding a slab of pig meat. Meat Sweats has tendril-like arms, commonly hidden beneath his gloves, which he uses to temporarily absorb the abilities of other mutants.
- Albearto (voiced by Tom Kenny impersonating Ed Wynn) is an animatronic brown bear used at children's birthday parties in Albearto's Pizzeria. After a small child short-circuits Albearto, April has Donatello upgrade him. A stage mishap causes Albearto to be electrocuted and come to life.
  - Al-Beardo (voiced by Tom Kenny) is an animatronic bear pirate who is the mascot of a failed Albearto's British- and pirate-themed franchise called Al-Beardo's Squid and Chips.
  - Bayou 'Bearto (voiced by Tom Kenny) is an animatronic bear hillbilly who is the mascot of a failed unnamed, Southern state-themed Albearto franchise.
  - Chef Albéar (voiced by Tom Kenny) is an animatronic bear who is the mascot of a failed Albearto's Pizzeria franchise called La Petite Albear.
  - Otto von Bearto (voiced by Tom Kenny) is an animatronic bear who is the mascot of a failed Albearto's Pizzeria franchise called Otto von Bearto's Best Wurst House.
- Warren Stone (voiced by John Michael Higgins) is a semi-successful and narcissistic news anchor who mutated into a small mutant earthworm after being stung by an Oozesquito. If cut in half, Warren can regenerate. Since his mutation, he declared himself the greatest foe of the Teenage Mutant Ninja Turtles always ignore him. Warren Stone later gains a gauntlet that can shoot beams which he named Charlotte. This was later found to be one piece of the Kuroi Yoroi, which was needed to revive Shredder. In "Warren & Hypno, Sitting in a Tree", Warren has become a roommate of Hypno-Potamus and loses the gauntlet to Baron Draxum. While heavily implied in the show but not outright confirmed, social media posts from writer Russ Carney and executive producer Andy Suriano confirmed that Warren and Hypno-Potamus are a couple.
- Mezmer-Ron / Hypno-Potamus (voiced by Rhys Darby) is a successful stage magician and hypnotist who mutated into a hippopotamus after he was stung by an Oozesquito, merging him with his pet hippopotamus Doug. Driven by envy, Hypno-Potamus strives to outachieve any magician with an even greater "trick" than they can produce, and find a way to bring Doug back to life, leading to his clashes with the Teenage Mutant Ninja Turtles. In "Warren & Hypno, Sitting in a Tree", Hypno-Potatmus has become a roommate of Warren Stone, later being captured by Baron Draxum in an attempt to lure Warren and the turtles to him so Draxum could capture them and take Warren's gauntlet - a plan that Hypno took part in in order to secure Warren's safety. However, once it was revealed that Draxum had no real intent to keep Warren safe, Hypno temporarily sided with the turtles - resulting him saving Warren's life and the two leaving peacefully. While heavily implied in the show but not outright confirmed, social media posts from writer Russ Carney and executive producer Andy Suriano confirmed that he and Warren Stone are a couple.
- Repo Mantis (voiced by Fred Tatasciore) is the vicious, treacherous, and greedy owner of a salvage yard called Repo Mantis Salvage who was mutated into a purple mutant mantis after being stung by an Oozesquito. His mutation has not affected his salvaging business.
  - Mrs. Nubbins is Repo Mantis' pet cat who was stung by an Oozesquito and mutated into a cat/mantis hybrid due to having been in contact with her owner. Repo Mantis keeps Nubbins locked up for his own safety.
- Ghostbear (voiced by Jorge Gutierrez) is a human masked wrestling champion in a white bear cape who cheats. Raphael was a fan of him until he learned the truth about his fighting techniques. In "Snow Day" while trying to get revenge on the Turtles for ruining his pro wrestling career, Ghostbear is stung by a defrosted Oozesquito and mutated into a mutant polar bear. This new form gives him the ability to become intangible.
- Mutant Cockroach Gang are an unnamed group of mutant cockroaches that posed as mascots.
  - Atomic Lass (voiced by Grey Griffin) is an unnamed mutant cockroach dressed as Atomic Lass.
  - Joey the Junkyard Dog (voiced by John DiMaggio) is an unnamed mutant cockroach dressed as Joey the Junkyard Dog.
  - Robot Vampire (voiced by Grey Griffin) is an unnamed mutant cockroach dressed as Robot Vampire.
  - Sergeant Woodpecker (voiced by Eric Bauza) is an unnamed mutant cockroach dressed as Sergeant Woodpecker.
- Baxter Stockboy (voiced by Ramone Hamilton) is an unpaid stockboy and self-proclaimed "internet celebrity". Both vengeful and avaricious, he strives to either profit from his live-streamed schemes or take revenge on anyone (particularly the Turtles) who hinders him in doing so.
- Mrs. Cuddles (voiced by Eliza Schneider) is a plush rabbit character from the TV series of the same name who comes to life to feeds on the fear of her to become bigger and stronger. If someone laughs at her, Mrs. Cuddles loses her size and strength.
- Big Mama (voiced by Lena Headey) is a cunning Jorōgumo who can change between her purple-skinned human form and her humanoid spider form and has a habit of using improper upper-class words when she speaks. She is the owner of an extradimensional gladiator arena called the Battle Nexus in the secret sub-level of the Grand Nexus Hotel, which she runs in her human guise. Big Mama uses the Oozesquitos in her possession to mutate anyone into mutants so that they can fight for her entertainment in the Battle Nexus. Her plot has brought her into conflict with Baron Draxum who felt that Big Mama was misusing the Oozesquitos. Hinted in "The Ancient Art of Ninja Hide and Seek", the episode "Many Unhappy Returns" reveals that Big Mama was the ex-girlfriend of Hamato Yoshi and the indirect cause of his mutation when she abducted him to fight in the Battle Nexus.
  - Gus (voiced by Fred Tatasciore) is a mutant bulldog loyal to Big Mama who can grow spikes on his body.
  - Fox Bellhop (voiced by Eric Bauza) is an unnamed mutant red fox who works as a bellhop at the Battle Nexus.
  - Octopus Elevator Operator (voiced by Nolan North) is an unnamed mutant octopus who works as an elevator operator at the Grand Nexus Hotel.
  - Otter Bellhop (voiced by Nolan North) is an unnamed mutant North American river otter who works as a bellhop at Big Mama's Battle Nexus.
  - Owl Bellhop (voiced by Fred Tatasciore) is an unnamed mutant barn owl who works as a bellhop at Big Mama's Battle Nexus.
  - Battle Nexus Champions are a group of powerful fighters from the Battle Nexus.
    - Troll is a troll with a lion-like head who wields a club.
    - Sprite (voiced by Zelda Williams) is a sprite who never laughs. She fights Leo and Carl Sando while possessing the Statue of Liberty. Leo and Carl were able to defeat it by doing comical moves that she found funny.
    - Amphisbaena is a two-headed serpent with an insatiable appetite.
    - Cortex (voiced by Eugene Byrd) is a Cthulhu-like creature with extremely high intelligence.
- Purple Dragons are a trio of snobby, criminal tech club students at April's high school. They are skilled at computer hacking, high-tech theft, and other technology-based abilities.
  - Kendra (voiced by Tania Gunadi) is the leader of the Purple Dragons. She has known April since kindergarten. In "Breaking Purple", it is revealed that Kendra's dad married Jase's mom, making them step-siblings.
  - Jase (voiced by Eugene Byrd) - Member of the Purple Dragons. He has a fear of cats and dogs and, despite clearly being smarter and more sensible than Jeremy, is often regarded with disdain by Kendra. In "Breaking Purple", it is revealed that Jase's mother is married to Kendra's father, making them step-siblings.
  - Jeremy (voiced by Kyle Massey) is an African-American member of the Purple Dragons. He refers to Kendra as "chief".
- Sando Brothers are two acrobat brothers in a circus who were turned into mutant crabs by Oozesquitos. They can attack by launching their left claws at their opponents.
  - Ben Sando (voiced by Paul Scheer) is the first half of the Sando Brothers who has no hair.
  - Carl Sando (voiced by Jason Mantzoukas) is the second half of the Sando Brothers who has hair.
- Capitán Piel (voiced by Christian Lanz) is a living skin who is the brother of Señor Hueso and the pirate captain of the S.S. Alexis. His name is Spanish for "Captain Skin".
  - Kraken Pirate (voiced by Eric Bauza) is a humanoid kraken who is a member of Capitán Piel's pirate crew.
  - Mermaid Pirate (voiced by Rob Paulsen) is a mermaid who is a member of Capitán Piel's pirate crew.
  - Sea Serpent Pirate (voiced by Maurice LaMarche) is a humanoid sea serpent who is a member of Capitán Piel's pirate crew.
- The Makers of Brutality are a gang of ogres.
  - Boss Beverly (voiced by Gillian Vigman) is a one-eyed ogre who is the leader of the Makers of Brutality.
  - Ogre Henchmen (voiced by Gillian Vigman) - The unnamed henchmen of Boss Beverly.
- The Masters of Barbarianism is a gang of reptilian creatures.
  - Boss Bruce (voiced by Vic Chao) is a humanoid Japanese dragon with an eyepatch over his left eye who is the leader of the Masters of Barbarianism.
  - Snake Henchmen (voiced by Eric Bauza and Vic Chao) is the unnamed humanoid snake henchmen of Boss Bruce.
- Dr. Alex Noe (voiced by Tony Hale) is a dentist obsessed with collecting teeth from extremely rare or unusual creatures.
- Sloppy Joseph - Sloppy Joseph is a meat-based mutant created after Draxum and April trapped an Oozesquito in Draxum's mystery meat concoction.
- Scor-Pion (voiced by John Kassir) is a zookeeper who was stung by an Oozesquito and mutated into a mutant scorpion after he was pushed into the scorpion habitat by his co-workers. Marcus Moncrief once mistook him for an alien.
- Mud Dogs are a group of criminals operating in the Hidden City who mistook Raph as Heinous Green, all three of which are voiced by Donnie, Leo and Mikey's voice actors from the 2012 series.
  - Dastardly Danny (voiced by Rob Paulsen) is a rat-like member of the Mud Dogs.
  - Loathsome Leonard (voiced by Seth Green) is an ogre-like leader of the Mud Dogs.
  - Malicious Mickey (voiced by Greg Cipes) is an electric eel-like member of the Mud Dogs.
- Heinous Green is a size-shifting green Yōkai who is one of the most wanted criminals in Hidden City. The Hidden City Police mistook Raph for this villain.
- Kristoff van Bradford (voiced by Peter Stormare) is a martial arts action star and Lou Jitsu's rival who took over most of Lou Jitsu's dojos and teaches his students to do dishonest martial arts moves.
  - Komodo Dojo Students (four of them voiced by Jill Talley) are five students at the Komodo Dojo who are loyal to Kristoff.
    - Frank (voiced by Eric Bauza) is one of Kristoff Van Bradford's students.
  - Komodo Dragon Yōkai is an unnamed Komodo dragon Yōkai which can infuse anyone it bites with mutagen, endowing them with superhuman strength. It is loosely based on the character King Komodo from the Image Comic series.

== Other ==
- Stewart (voiced by Fred Tatasciore) is a food delivery man who accidentally fell into the Hidden City after mistaking a portal opened by Garm and Freki for a shortcut. He was captured by Baron Draxum, who used an Oozesquito to turn him into a mutant whitefish.
- Clem (voiced by Eric Bauza) is the owner of a candy shop who can shift between a pink-skinned human form and a magenta mutant goat form. His shop is a front where he sells magical items. To access the magical items, the password one has to say is "wink", although it is easy to get the password as Clem often accidentally tells it to the customers.
- Trash Wizard (voiced by Eric Bauza) is a man who dresses like a wizard and likes to dramatically place himself in the Turtles' path (especially during high-speed pursuits) as he yells "You shall not pass!"
- Hidden City Police Officers (voiced by Eric Edelstein and Audrey Wasilewski) are the unnamed members of the Hidden City Police Department. The male one resembles a humanoid winged lion and the female one is an unspecified creature.
- Exploding Frankie (voiced by Eric Bauza) is a slime Yōkai that can explode and reassemble at will. He is the father of Sunita and works as a birthday entertainer at Run of the Mill Pizza.
- Harold / Stinkbomb (voiced by James Adomian) is the leader of the property caretakers of a botanical garden who led his fellow caretakers in fighting the Foot Clan when they trespassed. After he saw that the corpse flower named Jewell was sliced, he rushed in and got it out to save it. To further his plans to take over the Foot and gain the Kuroi Yōroi, Baron Draxum deployed his Oozesquitos who mutated Harold into a mutant corpse flower that started attacking both sides to get them off the grass.
- Bat Librarian (voiced by Gillian Vigman) is a four-armed bat-like creature who works at the Undercity's library.
  - Hush-Bats are a swarm of bats who work for the Bat Librarians. They will carry off anyone who makes a sound and place them in the kiddie room.
- Marcus Moncrief (voiced by Phil LaMarr) is an actor who portrays Jupiter Jim, the titular character of a long-running fictional science fiction adventure franchise. Secretly insane, he believes himself to be Jupiter Jim to the point of building fully functional versions of his Jupiter Jim movie weapons, paralyzing his own fans, and dressing them up like trophies for his private Jupiter Jim museum.
  - Red Fox (voiced by Lauren Lapkus) is a red panda-type Yōkai with a prehensile tail who was Marcus Moncrief's co-star in the Jupiter Jim movies. She left after not being respected by Moncrief. Leo, Mikey, and Donnie encounter Red Fox at a theater, where she denies being a Yōkai. Red Fox later saves Moncrief and Raphael from Scor-Pion's trap.
- Council of Heads (voiced by Susan Blu, Peter Cullen, and Frank Welker) are a trio of large stone heads that run the Yōkai community. They are against Baron Draxum's plot to mutate humanity, citing his experiments as an offense against their very nature. The Council of Heads sent Agent 64/Mayhem to spy on him. In the episode "Reparin' the Baron", the Council of Heads are furious at Draxum for his crimes against both humanity and the Yōkai. However, they offer to forgive Garm and Freki for their assistance in his crimes in exchange for bringing Draxum to the Hidden City to stand trial.
- Loose Lips Malinowski (voiced by Russ Carney) is a fence constantly on the lookout for easy money. As his nickname signifies, he is prone to unconsciously spilling his beans to anyone asking him a direct question about his dealings.
- Mayor Mira (voiced by Kathy Najimy) is a witch who is the mayor of the Hidden City's Witch Town district.
- Hamato Sho (voice by Matthew Yang King) is Hamato Yoshi's maternal grandfather against whom Yoshi became embittered for trying to push onto him the tradition of the Hamato Clan to prevent the Shredder's return, a duty which took his mother away from him during his childhood.
