= Fishbone (2020 film) =

2020 Nigerian short film

Fishbone is a 2020 short film by Nollywood producer, Editi Effiong, which was set in Makoko, Lagos, Nigeria, and tells the story of drug counterfeiting and the exploitation of talented inhabitants of the Makoko slum.

The short film was birthed thanks to a collaboration between Anakle Films and the US Mission in Nigeria. The film features actors like Daniel Etim Effiong, Shaffy Bello, Moshood Fattah and other Nollywood stars.

== Synopsis ==
Fishbone features Mama T (Shaffy Bello) who runs a drug counterfeiting business in Makoko, relying on the exploitation of the poor residents of the slum, while being hunted by Inspector Cole (Daniel Etim Effiong) for her crimes. The film addresses piracy and counterfeiting of any type, and derived its title from an Ibibio proverb, which translates “a witch does not kill her own grandchild. Their rib will get stuck in her throat like a fishbone.“

== Selected cast ==
- Shaffy Bello as Mama T
- Daniel Etim Effiong as Inspector Cole
- Moshood Fattah as Schoolboy
- Dorcas Paul as Linda
- Olanrenwaju Oladipo as Cletus
- Blessing Okeoghene as Baby
- Blessing Jessica Obasi
- Okwuonye Chuks as Bodyguard
- Florentina Ago as Lawyer
- Waliu Fagbemi as Driver

== Release date ==
Fishbone was released on YouTube on May 1, 2020 just after the pandemic. Anakle Films had the official trailer released the year before, on September 12, 2019.

== Awards and nominations ==
| Year | Award | Category | Recipient | Result | Ref |
|---|---|---|---|---|---|
| 2020 | HAPAwards (4th African Independent Film Festival) | Best Short Film | Editi Effiong | Nominated | |
| 2020 | HAPAwards (4th African Independent Film Festival) | Best Actor in a Short Film | Moshood Fattah | Nominated | |
| 2020 | HAPAwards (4th African Independent Film Festival) | Best Actress in a Short Film | Shaffy Bello | Nominated | |
| 2020 | HAPAwards (4th African Independent Film Festival) | Best Supporting Actor in a Short Film | Daniel Etim Effiong | Nominated | |
