= Latasha Ngwube =

Nigerian journalist

- Born: Latasha Onyebuchi Ngwube; 8 May 1983 (age 42); Lagos
- Education: Federal government girls college, Shagamu
- Alma mater: University of Lagos
- Occupation: Lifestyle Journalist

Latasha Onyebuchi Ngwube (born May 8, 1983) is a Nigerian journalist, media personality, and advocate for body positivity. She is best known for her work in the Nigerian fashion and entertainment industry, as well as her efforts to promote inclusivity and diversity in the media.

== Early life and education ==
Latasha Ngwube was born on May 8, 1983, in Lagos, Nigeria. She attended Federal government girls’ college, Shagamu and graduated in 1999. She then proceeded to the University of Lagos.

== Career ==
Ngwube's journalism career began with notable roles in traditional print media houses such as Vanguard (Nigeria) newspaper, Allure magazine, This Day newspaper, Pride Magazine, Business Day, and RedEdit Magazine.

Ngwube is the creative director of AboutThatCurvyLife, a dynamic movement that advocates for size diversity, inclusion, and acceptance in Africa. Under her leadership, AboutThatCurvyLife organized the first-ever size-inclusive runway show at Lagos Fashion Week, featured on CNN, BBC, and Euronews. Her efforts have significantly contributed to reshaping the fashion industry's narrative and promoting body positivity.

Ngwube is considered by some to be an influential figure and tastemaker.

She has been involved in charitable initiatives, particularly those focused on education and empowerment in underserved communities.

== Awards and recognition ==
Ngwube was appointed as the Director of Media and PR at the maiden edition of the Edo State Film Festival (ESIFF). She was included in the 80th Golden Globes award non-member voting committee. Additionally, she served as a guest editor for AccelerateTV's The Cover magazine.
