= Lukman Shobowale =

Nigerian entrepreneur and writer (born 1994)

- Born: Lukman Olawale Shobowale; 29 May 1994 (age 32); Nigeria
- Education: University of Ilorin, Ajayi Crowther University, Lagos Business School
- Occupations: Real estate developer and Author
- Known for: CEO/Co-founder of Dukiya Investments
- Spouse: Oluwapelumi Shobowale
- Website: lukmanshobowale.com

Lukman Olawale Shobowale (born 29 May 1994) is a Nigerian writer and businessman that focuses on real estate investments. He is the co-founder and CEO of Dukiya Investments.

== Early life and education ==
Lukman is an alumnus of the University of Ilorin, where he studied History and International Studies for his Bachelor of Art Degree before proceeding to Ajayi Crowther University for a Masters in Business Administration in 2021. During his undergraduate degree at the University of Ilorin, he served as the President of the Student Union for the 2016/2017 academic year.

He went on to the Lagos Business School for the Owner Managers Programme. He attended executive programs at Rome Business School in 2023 and London Business School in 2024.

== Career ==
Lukman founded Dukiya Investments Limited, a Lagos-based real estate development and construction firm.

He is an author and also serves as the head of Business Development at Dukiya Investments LTD. Lukman is known for real estate, business, writing, and leadership. He advocates for the use of real estate to build wealth for future generations.

== Personal life ==
He is married to Oluwapelumi Shobowale and has two daughters.

Lukman is a volunteer who also engages in philanthropic activities.

== Books ==
- The Real Value of Wealth: Thoughts on Real Estate, Nigeria, and the Global Economy. Independently published. 23 July 2023. ISBN 979-8852436771.
- Emerge!: Like a Lotus in a Pond. Solakat Printhouse. 2017. ISBN 978-978-54560-9-7.

== Recognition ==
- 2023 Entrepreneur of the Year Prize by The Future African Awards
- The Entrepreneur of the year at the Real Estate Conference and Recognition Award (RECRA 2023)
- The Top 100 Nigerian Youth Leaders by the Ooni of Ife, Oba Adeyeye Enitan Ogunwusi, honored Lukman as one of the young Nigerians leading the way in the leadership and business arenas in 2020.
- 2016 Peace Ambassador in KWARA State.
