= Noah Ibrahim =

Nigerian real estate developer

- Born: Noah Olanrewaju Ibrahim; April 20, 1992 (age 34)
- Education: Obafemi Awolowo University
- Occupation: Real Estate Entrepreneur
- Years active: 2014–present
- Known for: Founder Of Novarick Homes
- Title: Chief Executive Officer

Noah Ibrahim is a Nigerian entrepreneur and chief executive officer at Novarick Homes, a property development company which was started in 2018. In 2021, he was appointed as the ECOWAS youth ambassador and received the Africa's Patriotic Personality Award from the League of African Development Students (LEADS Africa).

== Early life and career ==
Ibrahim was born on 20 April 1992 to Nigerian parents, he did his Primary and Secondary School education in St Leo's Catholic School, Lagos and Mayflower School Ikenne, Remo, Ogun State respectively before proceeding to Obafemi Awolowo University, Ile Ife, Osun State where he graduated with a bachelor's degree in mechanical engineering.

He co-founded Noah&Nola, a footwear brand in 2014 and later ventured into real estate development in 2018 when he founded Novarick Homes and Properties Ltd a real estate development company, operating in Nigeria.

== Awards and recognition ==
- (2016) Business Day CEO Apprentice 2016 - Winner
- (2020) Vanguard News listed Ibrahim as one of its 10 Real Estate Disruptors of 2020.
- (2021) Africa’s Patriotic Personality Award and a Development Mandate Service Award – League of African Development Students (LEADS Africa)
