= Ife Olujuyigbe =

Nigerian film producer, screenwriter and director

- Born: Ifeoluwa Olujuyigbe; Jos, Plateau State, Nigeria
- Education: Obafemi Awolowo University
- Occupations: Film producer; screenwriter; director
- Years active: 2017–present
- Known for: Ile Owo, Obara'm, Egun, Reel Love
- Awards: The Future Awards Africa Prize for Film (2023)

Ifeoluwa "Ife" Olujuyigbe is a Nigerian film producer, screenwriter and director working in Nollywood. She is known for her production and writing work with the Lagos-based studio FilmTrybe, and for credits on films including Ile Owo (House of Money), Obara'm, Egun and Reel Love. In 2023 she received The Future Awards Africa Prize for Film.

== Early life and education ==
Olujuyigbe was born in Jos, Plateau State, and later moved with her family to south-western Nigeria. At the encouragement of her parents, she studied Chemical Engineering at Obafemi Awolowo University, Ile-Ife, and worked briefly in the corporate and oil-and-gas sector before moving into film full-time.

== Career ==
Olujuyigbe began writing fiction and reviewing Nollywood films as a critic, including for the platform True Nollywood Stories, before moving into filmmaking. She trained through masterclasses at the Lagos Film Academy and has described the producer Jade Osiberu as an early mentor.

She has worked extensively with FilmTrybe, the studio founded by director Kayode Kasum, in roles spanning screenwriting, producing and directing. Her producing and associate-producing credits include Ile Owo (House of Money) (2022) and Obara'm (2022), both released on Netflix, and Egun (2023), a cinema release produced in collaboration between FilmTrybe, Singularity Media and FilmOne Entertainment. She also worked as a production manager on The Trade (2023), released on Amazon Prime Video.

As a screenwriter, her credits include the RedTV series When Are We Getting Married?, the feature Reel Love (2025), and titles such as What About Us? and The Thing with Feathers. She has said that directing is the role she is most drawn to, and in 2025 she released a debut single, "Soul Cry".

== Recognition ==
Olujuyigbe received The Future Awards Africa Prize for Film at the awards' 17th edition, held in October 2023 in Lagos. She has also received a nomination at the Africa Magic Viewers' Choice Awards in connection with the series When Are We Getting Married? In 2026 she was featured by BusinessDay among women identified as shaping the future of the Nigerian film industry.

== Selected filmography ==
Year	Title	Role	Notes
2022	Ile Owo (House of Money)	Associate producer	Netflix
2022	Obara'm	Associate producer	Netflix
2023	Egun	Producer	Cinema release
2023	The Trade	Production manager	Amazon Prime Video
2023	When Are We Getting Married?	Writer	RedTV series
2025	Reel Love	Writer	Cinema release
