= Solomon Ayodele =

Nigerian tech executive

Solomon Ayodele is a Nigerian tech executive and social activist. He is the Head of Product and Technology Innovation at Wema Bank and founder of the boy-child advocacy movement Boys Quarters Africa. He won The Future Awards for Activism and Advocacy and The Future Awards Africa for Intrapreneurship in 2025.

== Education and career ==
Ayodele holds a degree in Political Science and Public Administration and an MBA from Heriot-Watt University’s Edinburgh Business School. Ayodele started his career as an analyst and product manager at Stanbic IBTC before heading to lead Product and Technology Innovation at Wema Bank.

=== Boys Quarters Africa ===
Ayodele is the founder and chief executive of Boys Quarters Africa; an organization focused on education, mentorship and empowerment for boys and young men. In 2019, Boys Quarters Africa launched #BoysToo campaign to address the sexual harassment and abuse of the male child. In 2021, Boys Quarters Africa partnered with the Lagos State Government to launch First Boys Club Against Gender-Based Violence.

== Awards ==
- The Future Awards for Activism and Advocacy, 2025
- The Future Awards Africa for Intrapreneurship, 2025
- 100 Nigerians Who Defined 2025, Zikoko Culture List
- Chartered Institute of Bankers of Nigeria Next Generation Bankers Award, 2022
- BudgIT Active Citizen Award for Community Service, 2022
