= Ikorodu Bois =

Comedy group

Ikorodu Bois is a Nigerian online comedy group that recreates and mimics multi-million dollar music videos, Hollywood movie trailers and epic pictures.

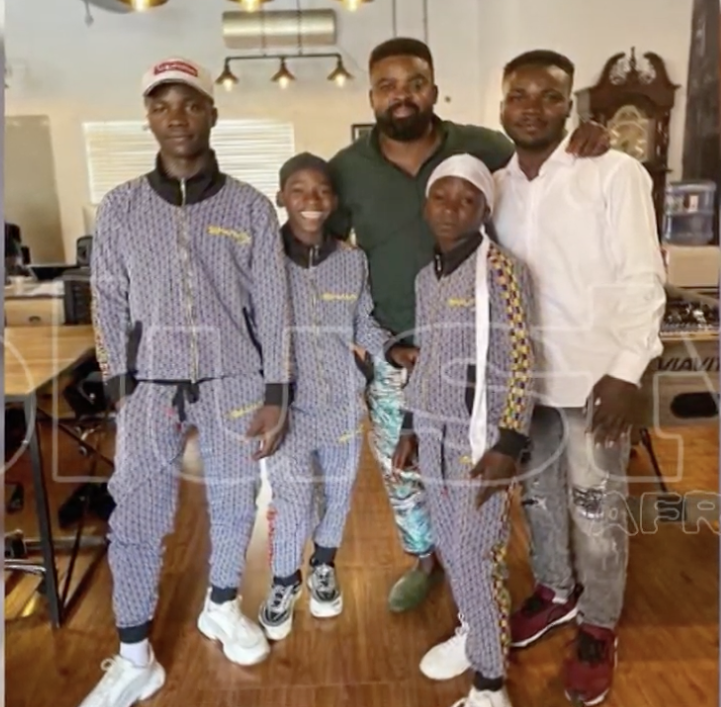
Ikorodu Bois with Kunle Afolayan - cropped

== About ==
Ikorodu Bois comprises three siblings namely, Babatunde Sanni, Muiz Sanni, Malik Sanni, and their cousin, Fawas Aina.

The three young boys are usually involved in the acting of the videos while their eldest brother, Babatunde Sanni does the editing of the videos. He also doubles as the group's manager.

The group makes use of common household items to depict top gears used in movies. Popular among these items is the use of local wheelbarrows to replicate luxury cars, an idea which was first exhibited by Kaptain Kush.

The name Ikorodu Bois is dubbed from a town called Ikorodu in Lagos, Nigeria, where the boys live.

== History ==
The group began in 2017 when Babatunde Sanni decided to share their skills with the world via social media. In an interview with CNN, Sanni said, "I felt like 'these things we are doing in our house, why don't we start putting them online?". He added that "our house is like a comedy house, we play too much".

== Notable works ==
Hollywood producers, Russo brothers, invited Ikorodu Bois to attend the premiere of the movie, Extraction 2 after the group re-enacted the trailer of the movie and posted it on Twitter and Instagram.

In April 2020, US actor and rapper, Will Smith, shared a clip of Ikorodu Bois' reenactment of Bad Boys Forever on his Instagram page with the caption: "This is GENIUS @ikorodu_bois!!".

Alvaro Morte who starred as Professor in the movie, Money Heist, remarked, "What an amazing job", after watching a mimicry of the Spanish series.

Ikorodu Bois have also done replica videos of DJ Cuppy, Davido, Funke Akindele, American Actor and WWE star, Dwayne "The Rock" Johnson, Roddy Ricch, Justin Bieber and Nigerian President, Mohammadu Buhari.

They also did a farewell replica of NBA Star Kobe Bryant shortly after his death.

In April 2021, they featured in a Netflix Oscar Weekend Film Brand Campaign which was on display at Time's Square in New York City. In the previous year, they had been gifted filming equipment by Netflix.

== Awards and nominations ==
| Year | Award | Category | Result | Ref |
|---|---|---|---|---|
| 2021 | Nickelodeon Kids’ Choice Awards | Favourite African Social Media Star | Nominated | |
