= BellaNaija =

Nigerian online magazine and blog

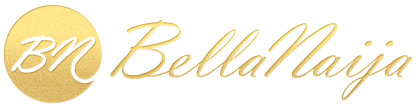
- Website type: Entertainment, fashion, lifestyle, weddings
- Available in: English
- Founded: July 2006
- Headquarters: Lagos, Nigeria
- Founder: Uche Eze
- Website: http://www.bellanaija.com/
- Advertising: Yes
- Registration: Optional
- Launched: 2 June 2006; 20 years ago
- Current status: Active
- Written in: HTML, JavaScript, CSS

BellaNaija is a Nigerian lifestyle, entertainment, and fashion website headquartered in Lagos, Nigeria.

== History ==
BellaNaija was founded by Uche Eze in 2006. In its early form, BellaNaija featured scanned magazine articles, pictures, and interviews of Nigerian fashion personalities.

== Achievements ==
In 2013, BellaNaija was ranked fourth in AfricaRanking's "Top 10 African Entertainment Websites." Uche Pedro and BellaNaija were also recognized on the SME 100 List of the 100 most creative female-owned firms in Nigeria. They completed the Stanford Seed program and the BBNWonderland – BN Lead Weddings Flagship Event with Baileys.

== Awards ==
| Year | Award | Prize | Result |
|---|---|---|---|
| 2015 | Creative Industries Awards | Creative Industries Awards for Bloggers | Won |
