= Izzy Odigie =

US/Nigerian choreographer

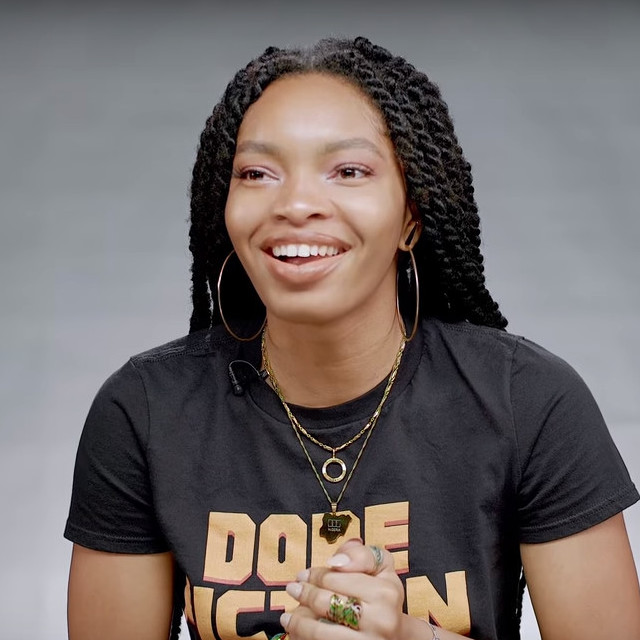
- in 2018 on NdaniTV
- Born: Iziegbe Aiwekhoe Uwadiae-Odigie; 1995 (age 30–31); Brooklyn, New York, U.S.
- Education: Nigeria
- Occupations: Dancer, Choreographer and Creative Director
- Known for: Viral Afrobeats Choreographies and Dance tours
- Website: https://iziegbe.com

Iziegbe Aiwekhoe Uwadiae-Odigie (born October 20, 1995), known popularly as Izzy Odigie, is a Nigerian-American dancer and choreographer. She is the founder and head choreographer of TRYBE, an agency focused on representing Afro dance artists. She is regarded as one of the most innovative choreographers in the African entertainment industry, credited for aiding in changing the perception of African street dances on the global stage. In 2022, she was chosen as CNN's African Change Makers for leveraging her influence to lead a dance tour (The Pan African Passport Tour) across four continents in one year, all while spotlighting the challenges African creatives face due to global perceptions tied to their nationality.

Izzy Odigie has worked with artists including Wizkid, Rema, Omah Lay, Yemi Alade, Ayra Starr, and Grammy award winner, Burna boy

== Early life ==
Odigie was born on October 20, 1995, in Brooklyn, New York but later relocated with family back to their homeland, Edo state, Nigeria. While attended boarding school, she fell in love with hip hop music and dance, often joining local competitions. She moved back to the US in 2007 and continued to pursue dance as a hobby, joining Laurel High School POMS team, competing locally and nationally at MAPDA and UDA competitions. In 2013, she gained admission into St. John's University in Queens, New York where she was given the opportunity to start a dance team for the African Students Association. Excited to finally take on the leadership role, she founded TRYBE, and began to build their reputation in the emerging afrobeats scene in NYC.

During a 2015 performance by TRYBE; Odigie came to notice when a video of her dancing with Eddy Kenzo to his hit song "Sitya Loss", reached over 20 million views.

== Career ==
As of 2019, Odigie had been on three dance tours, the Eggplant Tour, the OMG Tour, and the Killin' Dem Tour, teaching her viral choreographies to the eponymous singles, with stops across North America and Asia. That same year, she was chosen as an honoree on OkayAfrica 100 women list. The list's emphasis was to highlight women who were disrupting their own local culture whilst at the same time demanding equal access to the global stage. She went on to choreograph and appear in an episode of the sixth season of the Fox US drama, Empire and became the first Afro dancer on the bill of BeautyCon alongside Cardi B, Drew Elliott, and many more.

Her work includes choreographing for music videos, festivals, TV shows, commercials, and films. She has collaborated with artists including Asake, Wizkid, Davido, Olamide, Mr Eazi, Sho Madjozi, Omah Lay, Ayra Starr, Goldlink, Jidenna, and Grammy award winner, Burna Boy. One of her most notable collaborations is with Nigerian pop star, Rema. Their first known collaboration was at the 2019 Afro Nation festival in Ghana. Odigie then went on to become the opening act on Rema's 2022 Rave and Roses tour, performing in venues such as O2 Academy Brixton and The Fillmore Silver Spring. In 2023, she choreographed and performed at the Théâtre du Châtelet for Rema's performance at the Ballon D'or ceremony, pulling in notable attendees such as Lionel Messi, Erling Haaland, Kylian Mbappe, Prince Albert II of Monaco, Aitana Bonmati, and David Beckham. In 2024, after choreographing his sold-out concert at The O2 Arena a couple months prior, Odigie choreographed and performed during Rema's appearance at the Brit Awards. Their last known collaboration was in September 2024 for his homecoming concert in their homeland Benin city, Edo state.

== Film ==
In 2020, Odigie released her self-titled, experimental dance film, "Iziegbe". A visual from the film became the official visualizer for Grammy award winner, Wizkid's single "Ginger" featuring Burna Boy. The year prior, she released her "Indaba Dance Tape", which was a 6 part series in collaboration with the 2019 African Utopia Festival that took place at the Southbank Centre in London.
