= AltSchool Africa =

Nigerian digital learning platform

- Industry: Education
- Headquarters: Nigeria
- Key people: Adewale Yusuf - CEO Akintunde Sultan Opeyemi Awoyemi
- Website: https://www.altschoolafrica.com/

AltSchool Africa is a digital based learning platform. It was founded in 2021 by Adewale Yusuf, Akintunde Sultan and Opeyemi Awoyemi.

== History ==
In 2022, AltSchool Africa raised $1 million pre-seed funding. In March 2022, Unity Bank partnered with AltSchool Africa to train female software engineers.

As of September 2023, it announced it had 20000 students from Nigeria, Kenya, Ghana, Rwanda, and the United Kingdom were enrolled on the platform.

In September 2023, Falz, Mr. Macaroni, Do2tun, Nora Awolowo, Joey Akan, and Chinonso Egemba were named as facilitators for the creative business arm of the school.
