= List of business schools in Africa =

This is a list of business schools found in Africa.

== Algeria ==
- Management Institute of Algiers (IMAA)

== Cameroon ==
=== Yaounde ===
- Yaounde Business School, Yaounde

=== Outside Yaounde ===
- Catholic University Institute of Buea
- Ecole Superieure Des Sciences Economiques Et Commerciales (ESSEC), University of Douala, Douala (public)
- Faculty of Social and Management Sciences | University of Buea (public)
- Faculty of Economics and Management Science | University of Bamenda (public) - (HIPDET) Bamenda
- Higher Institute of Professional Studies (HIPS) - Buea (private)
- School of Business and Management Sciences| HIBMAT University Institute of Buea-HUIB
- University of Dschang (public)

== Cape Verde ==
- ISCEE Cape Verde Business School (ISCEE), Praia/Mindelo
- University of Cape Verde
- University of Santiago (Cape Verde)

== Ghana ==
=== Accra ===
- Accra Business School
- African Graduate School of Management and Leadership, Kanda
- Central University College
- Ghana Institute of Management and Public Administration (GIMPA)
- Nobel International Business School
- University of Ghana Business School
- Valley View University, Accra and Sunyani
- Zenith University College, School of Business, Labadi, Trade Fair-Accra

=== Outside Accra ===
- KNUST School of Business, Kumasi
- Sunyani Polytechnic School of Management, Sunyani
- University of Cape Coast School of Business, Cape Coast
- University of Professional Studies, Accra - U.P.S.A, Legon

== Kenya ==
=== Nairobi ===
- University of Nairobi
- University of Nairobi – Embu University College
- Daystar University
- KCA University
- Kenyatta University
- Kenyatta University – Machakos University College
- Pan Africa Christian University
- Strathmore University
- Technical University of Kenya
- United States International University

=== Outside Nairobi ===
- Africa Nazarene University, Ongata Rongai
- Catholic University of Eastern Africa, Langata
- Chuka University, Chuka
- Dedan Kimathi University of Technology, Nyeri
- Egerton University, Nakuru
- Great Lakes University of Kisumu, Kisumu
- Jaramogi Oginga Odinga University of Science and Technology, Bondo
- Kabarak University, Nakuru
- Karatina University, Karatina
- Kenya Methodist University, Meru Town
- Kibabii University, Bungoma
- Kisii University, Kisii
- Laikipia University, Nyahururu
- Maasai Mara University, Narok County
- Maseno University, Kisumu
- Masinde Muliro University of Science and Technology, Kakamega Town
- Meru University of Science and Technology, Meru
- Moi University, Uasin Gishu
- Moi University – Rongo University College
- Mount Kenya University, Thika
- Presbyterian University of East Africa, Kikuyu
- Pwani University, Kilifi
- Scott Theological College, Machakos
- South Eastern Kenya University, Kitui County
- St Paul's University, Kiambu County
- University of Eastern Africa, Baraton
- University of Eldoret
- University of Kabianga

== Morocco ==
=== Rabat ===
- Africa Business School
- ESCA School of Management
- ISCAE
- HEM Business School

=== Outside Rabat ===
- Al Akhawayn School Of Business Administration (SBA), Ifrane
- National School of Business and Management in Settat
- Sup de Co Marrakech

== Namibia ==
- Harold Pupkewitz Graduate School of Business, Windhoek
- Namibia Business School, University of Namibia

== Nigeria ==
=== Lagos ===
- Business School Netherlands
- Beeches Graduate School of Business
- ESUTH Business School
- Expert Business School (EBS)
- Fate Foundation
- Pan-Atlantic University, Lagos Business School (LBS)
- Poma International Business Academy (PIBA)
- University of Lagos Business School

=== Outside Lagos ===
- African Business School (ABS), Abuja
- ANAN University Business School, Jos
- Bowell Business School, Lagos & Akure
- Dangote Business School, Bayero University Kano
- The Delta Business School, Warri
- Garden City Premier Business School (GCPBS), Port Harcourt
- GPE Business School, Enugu
- Integrated Business School (IBS), Kaduna
- Kaduna Business School, Kaduna
- Lincolnshire Business School (LBS), Abuja
- MSME Business School, Abuja & Owerri
- Obafemi Awolowo University Business School, Ife
- Unicaribbean Business School Nigeria - Lagos, Abuja, Port-Harcourt, Akure, Delta State
- University of Ilorin Business School, Ilorin
- Unizik Business School, Nnamdi Azikiwe University, Awka
- Warri Business School (WBS), Warri
- West Africa Business School (WABS) Lagos; Accra, Ghana

== Rwanda ==
- Kigali Institute of Science and Technology

== Tanzania ==
=== Dodoma ===
- Open University of Tanzania
- University of Dodoma

=== Outside Dodoma ===
- College of Business Education, Dar es Salaam
- Eastern and Southern African Management Institute, Arusha
- Mwenge Catholic University, Moshi
- Mzumbe University, Mzumbe
- Tanzania Business School (TBS), Morogoro
- UDSM Business School, Dar es Salaam
- University of Iringa, Iringa

== Tunisia ==
=== Tunis ===
- Avicenne Private Business School
- Mediterranean School of Business

=== Outside Tunis ===
- Carthage University, Soukra
- Institut des Hautes Etudes Commerciales, Carthage and Sousse
- Tunis Business School, El Mourouj, Ben Arous Governorate

== See also ==
Lists of business schools in other continents:

- List of business schools in Australia
- List of business schools in Asia
- List of business schools in Europe
- List of business schools in the United States
