= List of universities and colleges in Kenya =

Location of Kenya

This is a list of universities and colleges in Kenya. Kenya has several universities and other institutions of higher learning. There are 36 public universities, 3 specialised universities,7 public university constituent colleges,30 chartered private universities and 4 universities with Letter of Interim Authority (LIA).

These universities are established through institutional Acts of Parliament under the Universities Act, 2012 which provides for the development of university education, the establishment, accreditation and governance of universities. According to a 2004 report on reforming higher education in Kenya, the rapid expansion of university education in the country was a spontaneous response to the increasing demand for higher education necessitated by the increasing flow of students from schools.

From July 2014, all government and private institutions offering technical and vocational education and training were put under TVET (Technical and Vocational Education and Training). This act normalized this sector as it had become tainted by unaccredited institutions offering substandard education as revealed by The Standard and The Star. As of October 10, 2016 there were 540 institutions accredited by the Authority.

== Public universities ==
NO	Name	Area	Year chartered	Original name	Year established	Campus
1	University of Nairobi	Nairobi	1970	Royal Technical College, Royal College, Nairobi	1956	Main campus, Kikuyu campus, Chiromo campus, Lower Kabete campus, Upper Kabete campus, Parklands campus, Kenya Science Campus, Kisumu campus, Mombasa campus
2	Moi University	Eldoret Kesses	1984	Moi University	1984	Odera Akang'o Yala Campus, Mombasa Campus, Kericho Campus, Nairobi Campus, Alupe Campus, Bomet University College
3	Kenyatta University	Nairobi	1985	Kenyatta University College	1965	Main campus, Parklands campus, Ruiru campus, City campus, Kitui campus, Mombasa campus, Nakuru campus.
4	Egerton University	Njoro	1988	Egerton Farm School, Egerton Agricultural College	1939	Main campus - Njoro, Nakuru Town Campus College (NTCC), Kenyatta campus.
5	Maseno University	Maseno	1991	Maseno Govt. Training Institute, Siriba Teachers College	1955	Oginga Odinga University
6	Jomo Kenyatta University of Agriculture and Technology	Kiambu	1994	Jomo Kenyatta College of Agriculture	1981	Multimedia University College of Kenya, Meru University College of Science and Technology, Murang'a University College
7	Technical University of Mombasa	Mombasa	2007	Mombasa Institute of Muslim Education (MIOME)	1948	
8	Masinde Muliro University of Science and Technology	Kakamega	2007	Western College of Arts and Applied Sciences	1972	
9	Dedan Kimathi University of Technology	Nyeri	2012	Kimathi Institute of Technology, Kimathi University College of Technology (2007) as a constituent college of Jomo Kenyatta University of Agriculture and Technology	1972	Main Campus, Nyeri
10	Chuka University	Chuka	2012	Chuka University College, Chuka University College (2004) as a constituent college of Egerton University	2004	Main Campus, Chuka
11	Laikipia University	Laikipia	2013	LSFTC (1965), AHITI (1979), Egerton University Campus (1990), Laikipia University College, as a constituent college of Egerton University		Main Campus, Nyahururu town Campus, Naivasha Campus, Nakuru Campus, Maralal Campus
12	South Eastern Kenya University	Kitui	2013	Ukamba Agricultural Institute (Ukai), South Eastern University College (Seuco)	2008	SEKU Main Campus, Kitui Town Campus, Mtito-Andei Campus, Migwani Center
13	Kisii University	Kisii	2012	Primary Teachers College, Secondary Teachers College (Diploma), Kisii University College,	1942 by Brighton	Main Campus, Eldoret Campus, Nairobi Campus, Kapenguria Campus, Kericho Campus
14	Multimedia University of Kenya	Nairobi	2013	Central Training School (CTS) to serve East African Posts Training School (1948), (KCCT) Kenya College of Communications Technology (1992), Multimedia University College of Kenya	2008	(MMU) Main Campus
15	University of Kabianga	Kericho	2013	The Government School, Kabianga (1925), Kabianga Teachers' Training College (1929), Kabianga Framers Training Centre (1959), Kabianga Campus of Moi University (2007), Kabianga University College	2009	(UoK) Main Campus, Kapkatet Campus, Kericho Satellite Campus, Satellite Campus
16	Karatina University	Karatina	2013	Moi University Central Kenya Campus, Karatina University College	2008	Main Campus, Karatina Town Campus, Itiati Campus, Nanyuki Campus, Riverbank Campus
17	Meru University of Science and Technology	Meru	2013	(MECOTECH) Meru College of Technology (1979), (MUCST) Meru University College of Science and Technology	2008	MUST Main Campus, Meru Town Campus
18	Kirinyaga University	Kerugoya	2016	Kirinyaga Technical Institute (1971), Kirinyaga University College (2011)	2016	Main Campus, Kutus town, Kirinyaga County
19	Pwani University	Kilifi	2013	Kilifi Institute of Agriculture	2007	Main Campus(Kilifi), Mombasa Campus
20	Murang'a University of Technology	Murang'a	2016	Murang'a College of Technology, Murang'a University College		
21	Machakos University	Machakos	2016	(MTTI) Machakos Technical Training Institute (1979), (MUC) Machakos University College	2013	MksU Main Campus
22	University of Eldoret	Eldoret, Kenya	2013	Chepkoilel Constituency College of Moi University	2013	Main Campus (Chepkoilel, Eldoret), Eldoret Town Campus
23	Kibabii University	Bungoma County	2015			
24	Maasai Mara University	Narok	2009	Narok Teachers Training College, Moi University Constituent College	2013	Narok
25	The Co-operative University of Kenya	Nairobi	2016	Jomo Kenyatta University of Agriculture and Technology	2016	CUK Main campus, Karen
26	Rongo University	Rongo, Migori	2016 Moi Institute of Technology (MIT), Rongo University College	1983	(RU) Main Campus	
27	Technical University of Kenya	Nairobi	2013	Kenya Polytechnic	1961	Main Campus (Nairobi)
28	Garissa University	Garissa	2017			Main Campus (Garissa)
29	Jaramogi Oginga Odinga University of Science and Technology	Bondo	2013	Bondo University College	2009	Main Campus (Bondo)
30	Taita Taveta University	Voi	2016	Jomo Kenyatta University of Agriculture and Technology(JKUAT) Taita Taveta Campus	2007	Main Campus (Voi)
31	Tharaka University	Tharaka	2022	Tharaka University	2017	Main Campus Marimanti
32	University of Embu	Embu	2016	Embu Agricultural Staff Training (EAST) College	1947	Main Campus (Embu)
33	Tom Mboya University	Homabay County	2022	Tom Mboya University College	2015	Main Campus (Homabay)
34	Kaimosi Friends University	Vihiga	2022	Kaimosi Friends University College (KAFUCO)	2015	Main Campus (Kaimosi)
35	Alupe University	Busia	2022	Alupe University College	2015	Main Campus (Busia)
36	Bomet University	Bomet	2026	Bomet University College	2017	Main Campus (Bomet)

== Public Specialised Universities ==
These are government-owned universities, but run on different models from mainstream universities

No.	Name	Location	Specialisation	Year Chartered
1.	National Defence University - Kenya	Nakuru	Military Sciences	2021
2.	National Intelligence Research University	Nairobi	Intelligence	2024
3.	Open University of Kenya	Konza	Virtual Educational	2023
4.	Kenya Advanced Institute of Science and Technology	Konza	Science and Technology postgraduate	2026

== Private universities ==
	University name	Original name	Year established
1	K.A.G East University	East Africa School of Theology	2024
2	Mount Kenya University (MKU)	Thika Institute of Technology	2006
3	Uzima University College (constituent college of CUEA)		
4	University of Eastern Africa, Baraton	Baraton Animal Husbandry Research Station	1980
5	Daystar University	Daystar University College	1989
6	Africa Nazarene University	African Nazarene University	1994
7	Scott Christian University	Scott Theological College	1962
8	Kabarak University	Kabarak University	2001
9	United States International University Africa (USIU - Africa)	United States International University, Nairobi Campus	1970
10	Strathmore University	Strathmore College	1961
11	Zetech University	Zetech College	1990
12	Kiriri Women's University of Science and Technology	Kiriri Women's University of Science and Technology	2001
13	Catholic University of Eastern Africa (CUEA)	Catholic Higher Institute of Eastern Africa	1984
14	Pan Africa Christian University	Bible College	1978
15	Kenya Methodist University	Kenya Methodist University	1997
16	Adventist University of Africa	Adventist University of Africa	2005
17	Gretsa University	Gretsa University	2006
18	Great Lakes University of Kisumu	Tropical Institute of Community Health and Development	1998
19	Presbyterian University of East Africa	Presbyterian College	1994
20	St. Paul's University	St Paul's Divinity School, St Paul's United Theological College	1903
21	KCA University	Kenya College of Accountancy	1989
22	Africa International University	Nairobi Evangelical Graduate School of Theology	1983
23	Riara University		2012
24	Management University of Africa	Management University of Africa	1993
25	Amref International University (AMIU)	Amref International Training Centre (AITC)	2017
26	Umma University (UMMA)	Thika College for Sharia and Islamic Studies	1997
27	Aga Khan University		1958(Pakistan)
28	Kenya Highlands University (KHU)	Kenya Highlands Bible College	1932

== Public University Constituent Colleges ==
These are fully independent institutions that rely on already established universities for curriculum development, and once fully mature, they are granted charter to confer degrees.

No.	Constituent College	Location	Mentor Institution
1.	Turkana University College	Lodwar	Masinde Muliro University of Science and Technology
2.	Mama Ngina University College	Gatundu	Kenyatta University
3.	Koitalel Arap Samoei University College	Nandi	University of Nairobi
4.	Nyandarua University College	Nyandarua	University of Nairobi
5.	Kabarnet University College	Baringo	Moi University
6.	Makueni University College	Wote	South Eastern Kenya University

== Approved universities in Kenya ==
The following tables list universities approved by the Commission for University Education (CUE) in accordance with the Universities Act (Cap 210) as of 12 March 2026.

=== Public chartered universities ===
No.	University	Year Chartered
1	University of Nairobi	2013
2	Moi University	2013
3	Kenyatta University	2013
4	Egerton University	2013
5	Jomo Kenyatta University of Agriculture and Technology	2013
6	Maseno University	2013
7	Masinde Muliro University of Science and Technology	2013
8	Dedan Kimathi University of Technology	2012
9	Chuka University	2013
10	Technical University of Kenya	2013
11	Technical University of Mombasa	2013
12	Pwani University	2013
13	Kisii University	2013
14	University of Eldoret	2013
15	Maasai Mara University	2013
16	Jaramogi Oginga Odinga University of Science and Technology	2013
17	Laikipia University	2013
18	South Eastern Kenya University	2013
19	Meru University of Science and Technology	2013
20	Multimedia University of Kenya	2013
21	University of Kabianga	2013
22	Karatina University	2013
23	Kibabii University	2015
24	Rongo University	2016
25	The Co-operative University of Kenya	2016
26	Taita Taveta University	2016
27	Murang’a University of Technology	2016
28	University of Embu	2016
29	Machakos University	2016
30	Kirinyaga University	2016
31	Garissa University	2017
32	Alupe University	2022
33	Kaimosi Friends University	2022
34	Tom Mboya University	2022
35	Tharaka University	2022
36	Bomet University	2026

=== Private chartered universities ===
No.	University	Year Chartered
1	University of Eastern Africa, Baraton	1991
2	Catholic University of Eastern Africa	1992
3	Daystar University	1994
4	Scott Christian University	1997
5	United States International University	1999
6	Africa Nazarene University	2002
7	Kenya Methodist University	2006
8	St. Paul’s University	2007
9	Pan Africa Christian University	2008
10	Strathmore University	2008
11	Kabarak University	2008
12	Mount Kenya University	2011
13	Africa International University	2011
14	Kenya Highlands Evangelical University	2011
15	Great Lakes University of Kisumu	2012
16	KCA University	2013
17	Adventist University of Africa	2013
18	KAG EAST University	2016
19	Umma University	2019
20	Presbyterian University of East Africa	2020
21	Aga Khan University	2021
22	Kiriri Women’s University of Science and Technology	2022
23	The East African University	2022
24	Zetech University	2022
25	Lukenya University	2022
26	Management University of Africa	2024
27	Tangaza University	2024
28	Islamic University of Kenya	2024
29	Riara University	2025
30	Uzima University	2025
31	Gretsa University	2025
32	Amref International University	2025

=== Specialized degree-awarding universities (public) ===
No.	University	Year
1	National Defence University–Kenya	2021
2	Open University of Kenya	2023
3	National Intelligence Research University	2024

== Technical and vocational education, and training institutions ==
- Ambritch College of Technology
- East Africa Institute of Certified Studies
- Talanta Institute
- African International Technical College(AITEC) www.aitec.ac.ke
- Africa Digital Media Institute - ADMI
- AirSwiss International College
- Divas Technology College - Kilifi
- Amboseli Institute of Hospitality and Technology - Thika, Nakuru
- Nairobi Institute of Software Development
- NairoBits Collage
- Nairobi Industrial Institute College
- Kenya Coffee School
- KMTC - Kilifi
- Barista Coffee Skills and Technology Training Institute
- Atlas College -Eastleigh, Nairobi
- Kenya Institute of Highways and Building Technology (KIHBT)- Nairobi
- Adept College of Professional Studies - Nakuru.
- African Institute of Research and Development Studies, Bandari College
- Baraton Teachers' Training College - Nandi Central Kapsabet
- Bungoma North Technical Vocational College -Naitiri
- Consolata Cathedral Institute -Nyeri
- Cascade Institute of Hospitality - Thika
- ELDORET TECHNICAL TRAINING INSTITUTE
- Eldoret Polytechnic - Eldoret
- Emma Daniel Arts Training Institute (EDATI)
- Government Training Institute (GTI)
- Gusii Institute of Technology
- Harvard Institute of Development Studies - Thika
- Hemland College of Professional and Technical Studies - Thika
- ICT Fire and Rescue - Thika
- Indian Institute of Hardware Technology- IIHT Westlands, Nairobi
- International Centre of Technology (ICT-Thika) - Thika
- Intraglobal Training Institute -Nairobi CBD
- Intraglobal Training Institute -Kisumu
- Intraglobal Training Institute -Kisii
- Intraglobal Training Institute -Embu
- Intraglobal Training Institute -Nakuru
- Intraglobal Training Institute -Donholm
- Jaffery Institute of Professional Studies - Mombasa
- Kabete National Polytechnic
- Kagumo College
- Kaiboi Technical Training Institute
- The Kenya College of Science and Technology
- Kenya Forestry College - Londiani
- Kenya Forestry Research Institute
- Keshnya School of Government (Formerly Kenya Institute of Administration (KIA))
- Kenya Institute of Biomedical Sciences and Technology - Nakuru
- Kenya Institute of Management (KIM)
- Kenya Institute of Mass Communication - South C
- Kenya Institute of Monitoring and Evaluation Studies (KIMES) - Nakuru
- Kenya Institute of Software Engineering - Thika
- Kenya Medical Training Centre (KMTC)
- Kenya School of Government
- Kenya School of Medical Science and Technology
- Kenya School of Monetary Studies - Ruaraka
- Kenya Science Teachers College, University of Nairobi
- Kenya Technical Teachers College (KTTC)
- Kenya Utalii College
- Kenya Water Institute - South C, Nairobi
- Kenya Wildlife Service Training Institute - Naivasha
- Kiambu Institute of Science and Technology
- Kigari Teachers College - Embu
- Kilimambogo Teachers College - Kilimambogo
- Kipkabus Technical and Vocational College (KTVC)
- Kisumu Polytechnic - Makasembo
- Kitale Technical Institute - Kitale
- Machakos Institute of Technology - Machakos
- Mboya Labour College - Kisumu
- Michuki Technical Institute - Muranga
- Nairobi Aviation College - Kisumu Campus
- Nakuru Counselling & Training Institute - Nakuru
- PC Kinyanjui Technical Training Institute (PCKTTI)
- Railway Training Institute - South B, Nairobi
- Ramogi Institute of Advanced Technology - Kisumu
- Rifkins College - Mombasa
- Rift Valley Technical Training Institute - Nakuru
- Sacred Training Institute - Bungoma and Nairobi Campuses
- Savannah Institute for Business and Informatics - Nakuru
- Sensei Institute of Technology for Plant Operator Training
- Sirisia Youth Polytechnic
- Teachers College
- Technical Training Institute (MTTI) - Mombasa
- The Thika Technical Training Institute - Thika
- Techno Links Ltd
- United Africa College - Nairobi
- Rift Valley Institute of Science & Technology - Nakuru
- Vision Empowerment Training Institute- Nairobi
- Vision Empowerment Training Institute- Kitengela
- Vision Stars Training Institute - Nairobi
- Visualdo Institute
- Kenya Institute of Development Studies (K.I.D.S.) - Nairobi
- Kenya Christian Industrial Training Institute- KCITI

== Proprietary schools ==
- Kenya Coffee School
- Africa College of Social Work
- African Institute of Research and Development Studies
- AirSwiss International College - Nairobi
- Airways Travel Institute
- Alphax College - Eldoret
- Amani College
- Arkline College - Nairobi
- Associated Computer Services - Development House, Nairobi
- AUGAB Computer College - Garissa
- Augustana College - Kasarani - Nairobi
- Australian Studies Institute (AUSI) - Westlands, Nairobi
- Bell Institute of Technology - Nairobi
- Belmont International College-Ongata Rongai - Kajiado
- Bible College of East Africa, Kasarani - Nairobi
- BizSmart Inter Technology
- Bungoma Technical Training Institute - Bungoma
- Career Training Centre - Nairobi
- Cascade Institute of Hospitality - Thika
- Centre for Distance & Online Learning - Nairobi
- Century Park College - Machakos
- Coast Institute of Technology
- College of Management Sciences - Nairobi CBD
- Compuera College - Nairobi
- Compugoal College - Nairobi
- Computer Learning Centre (CLC) - Nairobi
- Computer Pride Training Centre - Nairobi
- Computer Training Centre - Nairobi
- NEWVIEW COLLEGE - Nairobi
- Intraglobal Training Institute- Nairobi
- Consolata Cathedral Institute -Nyeri
- Consolata Institute of Communication and Technology - Nyeri-Mathari
- Cornerstone Training Institute - Nairobi
- Dairy Training Institute Naivasha (DTI Naivasha)
- Digital Resource Center (DRC) - Karama Estate, Nakuru
- Digiworld Computer School - Meru
- Don Bosco Boys' Town - Karen
- Don Bosco Institute of Management Studies, Nairobi
- Duolotech Computers - Gachie and Thika
- Eagle Air Aviation College (EAAC) - Ongata Rongai
- Eagle College of Management Studies
- East Africa Institute of Certified Studies - Nairobi
- East Africa School of Journalism (EASJ) - Jamuhuri Show Ground
- East Africa School of Management - Nairobi
- East Africa Vision Institute
- East African Media Institute (EAMI) - Nairobi
- East African School of Aviation - Embakasi, Nairobi
- Eldoret Technical Training Institute- Eldoret
- Eldoret Aviation Training Institute - Eldoret
- Elite Centre - Embakasi - Nairobi, Mlolongo, next to Co-operative Bank, Stepup Training Institute, Nakuru
- Elite Commercial Institute - Embakasi, Syokimau, satellite branches
- Elix Centre of Informatics - Lokichar-Turkana
- Emanex Computer College - Kahawa
- Esmart College - Kikuyu Town
- Felma College - Nairobi - Embakasi
- German Institute of Professional Studies - Nairobi
- Globoville Shanzu Beach College - Mombasa
- Graffins College - Westlands, Nairobi
- Gusii Institute of Technology - Kisii
- Hansons College of Professional Studies - Gachie, Nairobi/Kuimbu
- Hemland Computer Institute – Thika, Thika Arcade 5th Floor
- Hi-tec Institute of Professional Studies - Mombasa CBD
- Higher Institute of Development Studies - CBD, Nairobi
- Holy Rosary College - Tala
- ICT Fire and Rescue
- The iNet College - Bungoma Cooperative Bank Building, 3rd floor, Bungoma County
- Institute of Advanced Technology - Loita House, Loita Street, Buruburu, Nairobi
- Institute of Advanced Technology Campus - Westlands
- Institute of Business and Technology - Nakuru
- Institute of Information Technology Studies & Research - Nairobi, Ambank Hse, University Way
- Institute of Zaburi Technologies - Nairobi CBD
- Inter-Afrika Development Institute - NACICO Plaza 4th Floor, Nairobi
- International Centre of Technology (ICT-Thika) - Thika
- International College of Kenya - Nairobi/Machakos
- International Hotel & Tourism Institute - Nairobi
- InterWorld College - Nairobi
- Intraglobal Training Institute - Nairobi, Kisumu, Nakuru, Embu, Kisii
- Jodan College of Technology - Thika
- Jogoo Commercial College - Nakuru
- Karatina Institute of Technology (KIT-Karatina) - Karatina
- Keiway Mining & Technology College - Equity Bank Bldg, Mtwapa
- Kenair travel and related studies - Nairobi and Mombasa
- Kenya Aeronautical College (Aviation, Engineering & Cabin Crew) Wilson Airport - Nairobi
- Kenya Christian Industrial Training Institute (KCITI) - Eastleigh Campus
- Kenya College of Communications Technology - Mbagathi, Nairobi
- Kenya College of Medicine & Related Studies - Nairobi
- The Kenya College of Science and Technology
- Kenya College of Skills and Talent Development - Embakasi
- Kenya Institute of Administration (KIA) - Kabete
- Kenya Institute of Applied Sciences
- Kenya Institute of Biomedical Sciences and Technology (KIBSAT) - Nakuru
- Kenya Institute of Development Studies (KIDS) - Nairobi
- Kenya Institute of Management (KIM) - Nairobi
- Kenya Institute of Mass Communication - South C, Nairobi
- Kenya Institute of Media and Technology (KIMT) - Nairobi
- Kenya Institute of Professional Studies - Nairobi
- Kenya Institute of Social Work and Community Development (KISWCD) - CBD, Nairobi
- Kenya Institute of Special Education (KISE) - Kasarani, Nairobi
- Kenya School of Accountancy and Finance - Kitale and Kisii
- Kenya School of Professional Counseling & Behavioural Sciences (KSCBS)
- Kenya School of Professional Studies (KSPS) - Parklands, Nairobi
- Kenya School of Technology Studies (KSTS)- Thika
- Kenya Science Teachers College - Jamhuri, Nairobi
- Kenya Technical Teachers College – Gigiri, Nairobi
- Kenya Utalii College - Nairobi
- Kenya Water Institute - South C, Nairobi
- Kenya Wildlife Service Training Institute - Naivasha
- Kericho Teachers College – Kericho
- Kiambu Institute of Science and Technology – Kiambu
- Kigari Teachers College – Embu
- Kilimambogo Teachers College - Kilimambogo
- Kima International School of Theology (KIST) - Kima, Western Province of Kenya
- Kimathi Chambers
- Kinyanjui Technical Training Institute - Riruta, Nairobi
- Kisumu Polytechnic - Makasembo, Kisumu
- Lake Region Business Training and Consultancy - Naivasha, Kwa Muhia
- Lakeview Training Institute - Naivasha Kangiri House
- Language School in Kenya, The - Chania Avenue, Kilimani Nairobi
- Mark University of IT - Uganda
- Mawego Technical Institute - Kendu Bay
- Maxton College Of Media & Communications - Nairobi Umo
- Meru Technical Institute - Meru
- Migori Teachers college, Migori
- Mosoriot Teachers College – Eldoret
- Motion City International - Multimedia School, The Make Up Place
- Murang'a Institute of Technology – Murang'a
- Na rap Training Institute - Yaya Centre
- Nairobi Aviation College - Nairobi
- Nairobi Film School - Kipande Road, opposite National Museum of Kenya
- Nairobi Institute of Business Studies (NIBS)
- Nairobi Institute of Software Development - Nairobi
- Nairobi Institute of Technology Westlands
- Naivasha Computer & Business Studies College - Naivasha, Kenya
- Nakuru College of Health Sciences and Management - KFA and Showground campuses, Nakuru
- Nakuru Counselling & Training Institute, Centre of Hope - Nakuru
- Nakuru Institute of Information Communication Technology
- Narok Teachers College – Narok
- Narok Teachers Training – Narok
- National Youth Service Engineering Institute - Nairobi
- Nationwide Hotel and Tourism College (NHTC) - Nakuru
- Neema Lutheran College - Nyamira
- Nkabune Technical Institute
- Oshwal College - Parklands, Nairobi
- Pan African School of Theology (PAST) - Nyahururu, Kenya
- PCEA Shalom Training College - Eastleigh, Nairobi
- Pioneer's Training Institute - Nairobi, Umoja
- PREMESE Africa Development Institute - Vision Plaza, Msa Road, Nairobi
- Premier College of Hospitality and Business Studies - Biashara Street
- Premier College of Professional Studies Ltd - Nairobi
- Prestige Academy and College - Nakuru
- The Regional Institute of Business Management - Nairobi CBD
- Regional Centre for Tourism and Foreign language - Eagle House, opposite Tacos Club
- Regional Training Institute - CBD, Nairobi
- Regions Group International College
- Rift valley institute of business studies, Nakuru and Kericho
- Rehoboth College - Nairobi, Ngumo area
- Riccatti Business College of East Africa
- Rift Valley Institute Of Science & Technology - Nakuru
- Rochester Business School - View Park Towers, Nairobi
- Royal Institute of Applied Sciences - Meru
- Sacred Lake Institute of Technology - Kiirua, along Meru Nanyuki Road
- Sagana Institute of Technology
- School of ICT & Hairdressing and Beauty - Pioneer College
- School of Professional Studies - Parklands, Nairobi
- Shalom Information Technology Centre - Shalom House, off Ngong Road, Nairobi
- Shanzu Teachers College - Shanzu, Mombasa
- Shepherds Foundation Education & Research Centre - Buruburu, Nairobi
- Skynet Business College - CBD, Nairobi
- Skypath Aviation College - Wilson Airport AMREF KCO building, Nairobi
- SMA Swiss Management Academy - New Muthaiga, Nairobi
- Softpro Computer Institute - Pipeline Tumaini S/mkt blg, 3rd floor, Pipeline (Embakasi)
- South Rift International College (SORICO) - AM Plaza, Kericho
- St. Andrew's Pre-Medical College - Mumbasa
- St. Joseph Vocational Training Centre - Mlolongo
- St Joseph's Medical Training College - Nyabondo
- St. Mary's School of Clinical Medicine - Mumias
- Stanbridge College - Voi
- Star Media Institute - South B Estate, Southgate Ctr 1st Floor, Nairobi
- Starnet College - Nairobi
- Stonebic College - Westlands, Nairobi
- Superior Group of Colleges Intl.
- Talent institute - Nairobi
- Tambach Teachers Training College - Kerio Valley, Rift Valley
- Tangaza College
- Taznaam Tutorial College - Nairobi
- Tec Institute of Management - Nairobi and Eldoret
- Thomas Asingo College of Computer and Business Management
- Times Training Centre - Mombasa
- Universal Group of Colleges - Nairobi CBD
- Vision Institute of Professionals - Nairobi and Mombasa
- Vision Stars Training Institute
- Wang Point Technologies College of Information Technology
- Western College of Hospitality and Professional Studies - Wechaps College, Kisumu
- Zetech College - Nairobi
- Kenyaplex Institute of Technology, Mwala
- Meru University of Science and Technology TVET
