= Wanjirū Wanyoike =

Kenyan plant scientist

Professor Wanjirū Wanyoike
- Occupations: Plant scientist, researcher, and lecturer

Academic work
- Discipline: Mycology and Plant Pathology
- Sub-discipline: Research in Wheat, Aflatoxin, Infection,Plant Pathology, Mycotoxins, Food, Mycology, Fungal Plant Pathology, Plant Disease Management, Environmental Mycology, Phytopathology
- Institutions: Jomo Kenyatta University of Agriculture and Technology (JKUAT) Kiriri Women's University of Science and Technology (KWUST)

Wanjirū Wanyoike is a Kenyan plant scientist and associate professor specializing in plant pathology, mycology, and crop protection at Jomo Kenyatta University of Agriculture and Technology (JKUAT). Her research has addressed plant diseases, fungal biology, and food safety, including studies on aflatoxins in maize, which are of significance to agricultural production and public health in Africa. She has contributed to fungal biodiversity and taxonomy, including co-authoring the identification and description of Macrolepiota aberdarense, an edible mushroom species documented in Kenya.

In addition to her research, Wanyoike has contributed to scholarly output through peer-reviewed publications and postgraduate supervision in plant science and related fields. She has also held senior academic leadership roles, including serving as Deputy Vice-Chancellor at Kiriri Women’s University of Science and Technology, where she has been involved in university administration and academic programme oversight.

Beyond her scientific work, she has authored a long-term genealogical and historical study on Kikuyu lineage, based on approximately 25 years of research, representing a distinct contribution outside her primary academic discipline.

== Education ==
Wanyoike earned her Bachelor of Science (BSc) and Master of Science (MSc) degrees from the University of Nairobi, before completing her Doctor of Philosophy (PhD) at the University of Hohenheim in Stuttgart, Germany.

== Career ==
Wanyoike has served as an associate professor in the field of plant science and botany at the Jomo Kenyatta University of Agriculture and Technology (JKUAT). Wanyoike also serves as the Deputy Vice-Chancellor at Kiriri Women’s University of Science and Technology. She supported initiatives promoting university education for women in science and technology fields. Her teaching and mentorship roles have included supervising graduate students and instructing in plant pathology and crop protection—fields central to sustainable agriculture and plant disease management. Through collaborations with Kenyan universities and research institutes, her work has focused on fungal biodiversity and taxonomy, plant–pathogen interactions, crop disease management, and biological control for plant health promotion. She has also supervised postgraduate research on antifungal metabolites, plant pathogens, and endophyte-based crop protection strategies in crops such as beans and maize, contributing to the training of emerging scientists in plant pathology and microbiology and supporting improved agricultural disease management in Kenya. Wanyoike, co-authored research describing Macrolepiota aberdarense, a newly identified edible mushroom species from Kenya, demonstrating her involvement in fungal taxonomy and biodiversity documentation.

=== Contribution to community ===
Beyond her academic work, Wanyoike has contributed to cultural and historical scholarship within the Kikuyu community through a long-term genealogical and historical study of the Kikuyu kinship (mbari) of Ago (leaders). Over a period of 25 years, she researched and documented the Gathirimũ family lineage, culminating in the book Kikuyu History Following Gathirimũ Bloodline. The study traces the lineage of the Gathirimũ family—including the last anointed Agĩkũyũ mũgo, Gathirimũ (1690–1791)—across Kiambu, Murang’a, Nyeri, and Kirinyaga counties, covering historical developments from about 1500–2000 CE and earlier linguistic contexts. Drawing on oral traditions and family records, the work documents the role of ago—prophets, leaders, and medicine men—and provides perspectives on Kikuyu migration and leadership traditions linked to the Gathirimũ lineage, historically associated with figures such as Kinyanjui wa Gathirimu. The book was launched at Ruiru Sports Club on 26 February 2026, contributing to the preservation of Kikuyu history and community heritage.

== Selected works ==
- Wanyoike, W., Mbaluto, C., Runo, S., et al. (2018). Macrolepiota aberdarense, a new edible mushroom from Kenya. Article.
- Wanyoike, W., Chebon, S. K., Bii, C. C., et al. (2017). Prevalence of Aflatoxin Biosynthesis Genes According to Aflatoxin Levels in Maize... Article.
- Wanyoike, W., Chebon, S. K., Bii, C. C., et al. (2016). Incidence of Aflatoxigenic Fungi and Aflatoxins in Maize... Article.
- Wanyoike, W., Chebon, S. K., Bii, C. C., et al. (2016). Incidence of Aflatoxigenic Fungi and Aflatoxins in Maize... Highland and Mid‑altitude... Article.
- Wanyoike, W., Kangogo, M., Bader, O., et al. (2015). Molecular types of Cryptococcus gattii/ Cryptococcus neoformans species complex... Article.
- Wanyoike, W., Kangogo, M., Bii, C. C., et al. (2014). Isolation and Characterisation of Cryptococcus neoformans and C. gattii... Article.
- Wanyoike, W., Mbaluto, C., Runo, S., et al. (2013). Morphological characterisation of Kenyan native Macrolepiota spp... Conference Paper.
- Wanyoike, W., Mbaluto, C., Runo, S., et al. (2013). Morphological characterisation of Kenyan native edible mushrooms... Conference Paper.
- Wanyoike, W., Menza, N., Muturi, M., et al. (2013). Prevalence of Vaginal Candidiasis... Article.
- Wanyoike, W., Menza, N., Muturi, M., et al. (2013). Identification and Susceptibility Profile of Vaginal Candida Species... Article.
- Wanyoike, W., Bii, F., Nyende, A. B., et al. (2012). Fumonisin contamination of maize... Article.
- Wanyoike, W., Kangogo, M., Bii, C. C., et al. (2009). Genotypes of Candida albicans from clinical sources... Article.
- Wanyoike, W., Walker, F., Buchenauer, H., et al. (2002). Relationship between virulence, fungal biomass and mycotoxin production... Article.
- Wanyoike, W., Kang, Z., Buchenauer, H., et al. (2002). Importance of Cell Wall Degrading Enzymes Produced by Fusarium graminearum.
