= Kianjokoma brothers case =

Criminal case involving the murder of two Kenyan brothers

The Kianjokoma brothers case is a criminal case involving the murder of two Kenyan brothers Benson Njiru Ndwiga and Emmanuel Mutura Ndwiga, who were allegedly murdered by the police during the enforcement of the COVID-19 lockdown in Kenya. Njiru, was 22 years old and an engineering student at the Don-Bosco Technology Training Institute at the time of the murder; and Matura a was 19 years old law student at the Kabarak University.

On 2 August 2021, media houses in Kenya reported on the alleged murder of the two brothers, involving police enforcement of lockdown regulations.

On August 17, 2021, six police officers were arrested in connection to the murder. On 9 February 2022, the criminal proceedings for the case begun at the Milimani Law Court.

== Disappearance, search and discovery of the bodies ==
On 1 August 2021, the two brothers failed to return home after closing their business in Kianjokoma shopping center. On 2 August 2021, their father, John Ndwiga, went to look for them at the Manyatta Police Station. He assumed they had been detained for failing to observe the covid lockdown restrictions. He however, did not find them.

On 3 August 2021, the bodies of the two brothers were found at the Embu Level 5 Hospital morgue. The family claimed that the brothers had been killed by the police. However, the police, through Embu East Police boss Emily Ngaruiya, claimed that the brothers had died from jumping from a moving police car. The police boss claimed that the brothers were arrested together with 9 other suspects and were all put in a police car. The brothers however, jumped out of the car without the police knowledge. Upon getting to the police station and realizing that the two brothers were missing from the car, the police went to look for them. She claimed that the police found them laying on the road with serious injuries and took them to the Embu Level 5 Hospital where they were pronounced dead upon arrival.

It would be later revealed that the two brothers were killed on the first day of their new business, a pork butchery in Kianjokoma.

A postmortem revealed that they died of multiple head and rib injuries inflicted by a blunt object. Mutura's head was deformed and had bruises on his face. Njeru on the other hand, had broken ribs and injury to the brain.

On 13 August 2021, the brothers were buried in the same grave but different coffins. On 24 August 2021, the grandmother of the two brothers died from depression.

== Protests in Embu ==
The death of the brothers sparked protests in Embu demanding justice. To disperse the crowds, the police used live rounds leading to the death of one of the protesters. Following this, the deputy inspector general of police Edward Mbugua ordered that Embu North Sub-county police Commander Emily Ngaruiya and OCS Manyatta Police station be redeployed to Eastern Regional Police headquarters.

== Arrests and court proceedings ==
On August 17, 2021, six police officers; Benson Mputhia, Consolata Kariuki, Nicholas Cheruyoit, Martin Wanyama, Lilian Chemuna and James Mwaniki, were arrested over the alleged killings of the two brothers. The court decided to detain them for 14 days to allow for comprehensive investigations and also protect the police from the community where the killings occurred.

On August 26, 2021, the six police officers sued the Director of Public Prosecutions, Inspector General of Police and the Independent Policiing Oversight Authority, to block them from charging them with murder. They instead wanted an inquest into the deaths. They also filed a petition to have the bodies of the brothers exhumed. They asked the court to allow them to hire their own pathologist for an independent autopsy. The high Court Judge Daniel Ogembo however, dismissed this application. On August 31, 2021, ten lawyers, representing the six police officers quit the case. In September 2021, the six police officers pleaded not guilty to two counts of murder. In November 2021, the six police officers were released on a cash bail of ksh.300,000 each. They were also barred from going to Kianjokoma or Embu county. One of the police officers, Benson Mputhia, was allowed to transit through Embu to get to his home county Meru.

On 9 February 2022, the criminal case for the alleged murder of the two brothers commenced at the Milimani Law Courts. The first witness to be called on stand was John Mugendi Njeru, a friend of the two brothers. He narrated the last encounter with the brothers. He explained that on August 1, 2021, after the brothers had closed their pork butchery, they met up with another friend Chris Dan and decided to go to a nearby club. At 10:01pm they left the bar and found a police outside in plain clothing. They decided to run away to escape the police. While running, Emmanuel tripped and fell, prompting Benson to go back for him. The witness, Mugendi, hid in a ditch but could see Benson from where he was hiding. He claimed to have heard someone being beaten and upon peeping, he saw the man in the hoodie beating Benson, before throwing him into the police cruiser. Mugendi then ran home, but left the police cruiser at the same spot. A second witness, Chris Dan Mureithi, confirmed the testimony given by Mugendi.

In November 2022, the parents of the brothers, John Ndwiga and Catherine Njuki, appeared in court to testify on the last moments with their sons. They explained that they had several calls with the two brothers who were at the pork butchery. They discussed closing the butchery early due to the covid curfew. However, their phones went off later in the night. The next morning, they started the search for the brothers and three days later, learnt of their death. The brothers uncle Felix Njagi, also testified in court. He narrated that upon learning of the deaths, he visited Manyatta Police station and one of the accused police officers, James Mwaniki, told him that the family would be compensated by the insurance for the deaths.
