= Francis Lelo =

Francis K. Lelo
- Born: 1952 (age 73–74); Kenya
- Citizenship: Kenya
- Education: University of Nairobi (Bachelor of Education); York University (Master of Science) (Doctor of Philosophy); Clark University (Master of Business Administration)
- Occupations: Academic & Academic Administrator
- Years active: 1988–present
- Known for: Educational administration, environmental conservation
- Title: Assoc Professor

Francis K. Lelo is a Kenyan academic, researcher and academic administrator. He is an associate professor of Environmental Studies at Egerton University. He has also served as the vice chancellor Laikipia University and as ag. Prior to that, he was a principal at Kisii University College (South-Western Kenya). Francis K. Lelo is an expert in community mobilization and is well known for his efforts in environmental conservation.

== Career ==
Lelo has a longstanding relationship with Clark University that began in 1981, when he was recruited as a research assistant by Richard Ford, a Clark professor who was engaged in a special project for USAID. Additionally, Lelo obtained a master's degree in environmental science from York University in Toronto. In 1990, he was awarded a scholarship to pursue his doctorate in geography at Clark and spent four years in Worcester. Lelo also served as the coordinator for Kenya's Participatory Rural Appraisal, a program created by Ford and fellow Clark professor Barbara Thomas-Slayter to equip African villages with the necessary tools and strategies to enhance their quality of life, ranging from developing a sustainable local economy to resolving internal conflicts. In 2008, he became part of Laikipia University College (later renamed Laikipia University), where he progressed to the position of vice chancellor in 2013. Clark University presented Vice Chancellor Lelo with an honorary degree.
