= Pan African School of Theology =

Evangelical college in Nyahururu, Kenya

Coordinates: 0°00′N 36°22′E

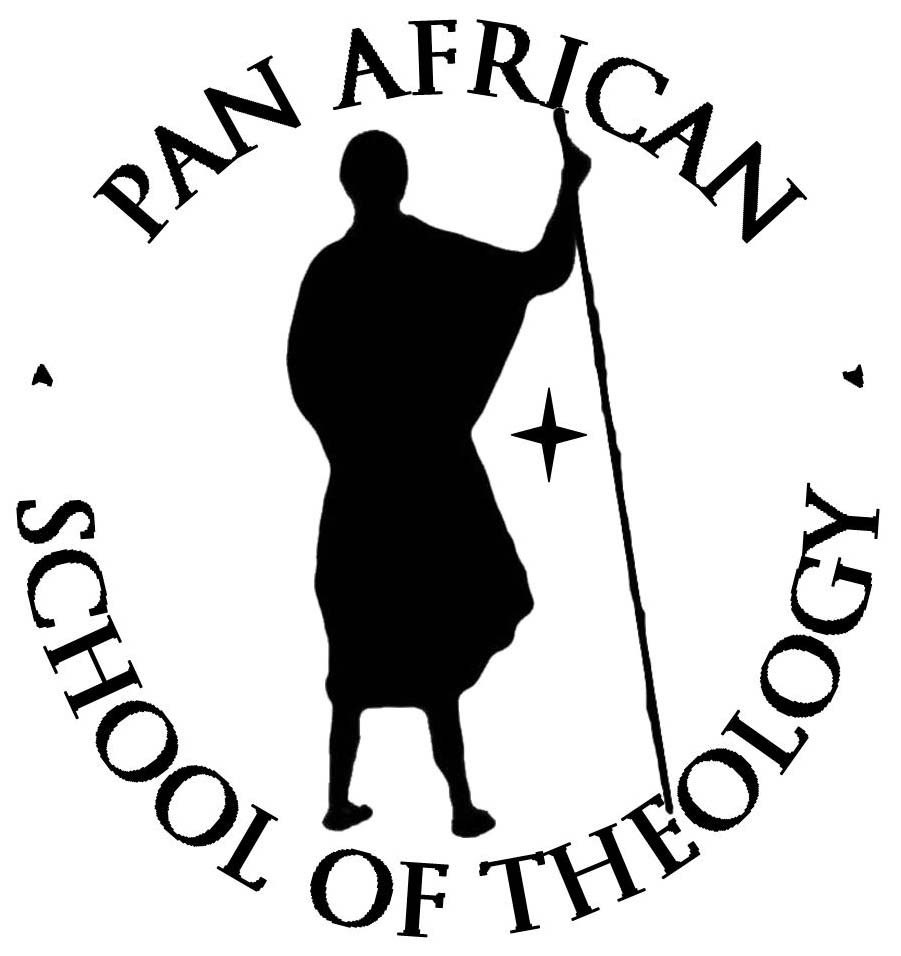
- Motto: "Equipping Pan Africans to Proclaim & Demonstrate the Power of the Word of God."
- Type: Private, Nonprofit, Christian
- Established: 2006
- President: Wachira Ngamau
- Location: Nyahururu, Kenya

Pan African School of Theology (PAST) is an evangelical theological college located in Nyahururu, Kenya. PAST is a globally significant entity as the first academic institution in the world solely dedicated to engaging men and women of African descent in scholarly dialogue over Pan-African issues in theology and ethnic teleology from a Biblical perspective.

== History ==
PAST was founded in 2006 by Pan African Christian Exchange (PACE Ministries International), an indigenous Christian mission organisation located in Nyahururu, Kenya. The college was given a mandate to provide higher education to local pastors and facilitate scholarly dialogue among people of African descent in the fields of theology and teleology. Today, PAST is a private, inter-denominational, residential and day college located on the equator at the eastern rim of the Great Rift Valley in the Aberdare Range highlands of central Kenya.

== Programmes ==
In association with the South African Theological Seminary (SATS), PAST facilitates accredited programmes in:

- Certificate in Christian Life
- Diploma in Biblical Studies
- Bachelor of Theology

Their programs are designed to prepare students for serving in areas of:

- Leadership & Management
- Relief & Development
- Peacemaking & Reconciliation
- Cultural studies
- Music
- Evangelism
- Communications (Broadcast & Publishing)
- Counseling & Psychology

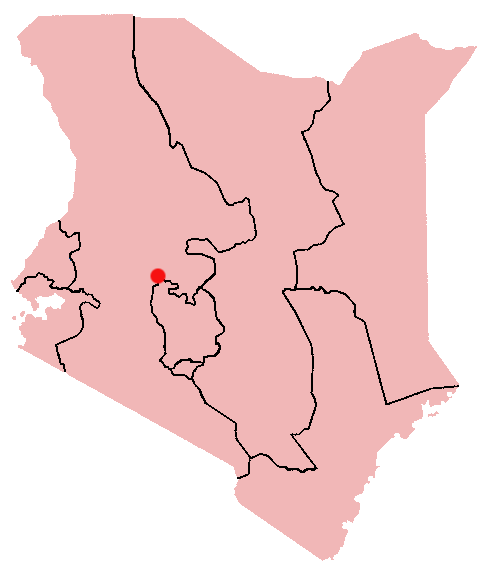
Location of Nyahururu in Kenya

== Accreditation and relationships ==
Pan African School of Theology is pursuing independent school accreditation by the Accrediting Council for Theological Education in Africa (ACTEA). SATS' programs are registered with the Commission for Higher Education (CHE) in South Africa, the Education and Training Quality Assurer (ETQA) of the South African Qualifications Authority (SAQA) and are registered by the Department of Education (registration number 01HX01).

At PAST, academic seasons follow a cycle of three twelve-week terms followed by four weeks of holiday. Michaelmas Term runs from September to November, Lent Term from January to March and Trinity Term completes the year from May to July graduation.

PAST maintains working relationships with other institutions throughout Kenya and Africa, such as Nairobi Evangelical Graduate School of Theology (NEGST), University of Nairobi, Daystar University, Nairobi International School of Theology (NIST), Pwani Bible Institute, St. Paul's United Theological College, Scott Christian University, Kabarak University and the Association of Evangelicals in Africa. Pan African School of Theology is to be distinguished from Pan Africa Christian University (PAC) (Nairobi, Kenya, East Africa); Pan-Africa Theological Seminary (PAThS)(Togo, West Africa) and The Pan-African Seminarians Association at Claremont School of Theology, with which there are no organizational connections.

== See also ==
- Pan-Africanism
- Pan-African Congress
- African diaspora
- Brown people
- Black people
- Race
- Black Consciousness Movement
- African theology
- teleology
- List of universities and colleges in Kenya
