= Moncef Belkhayat =

Moroccan politician

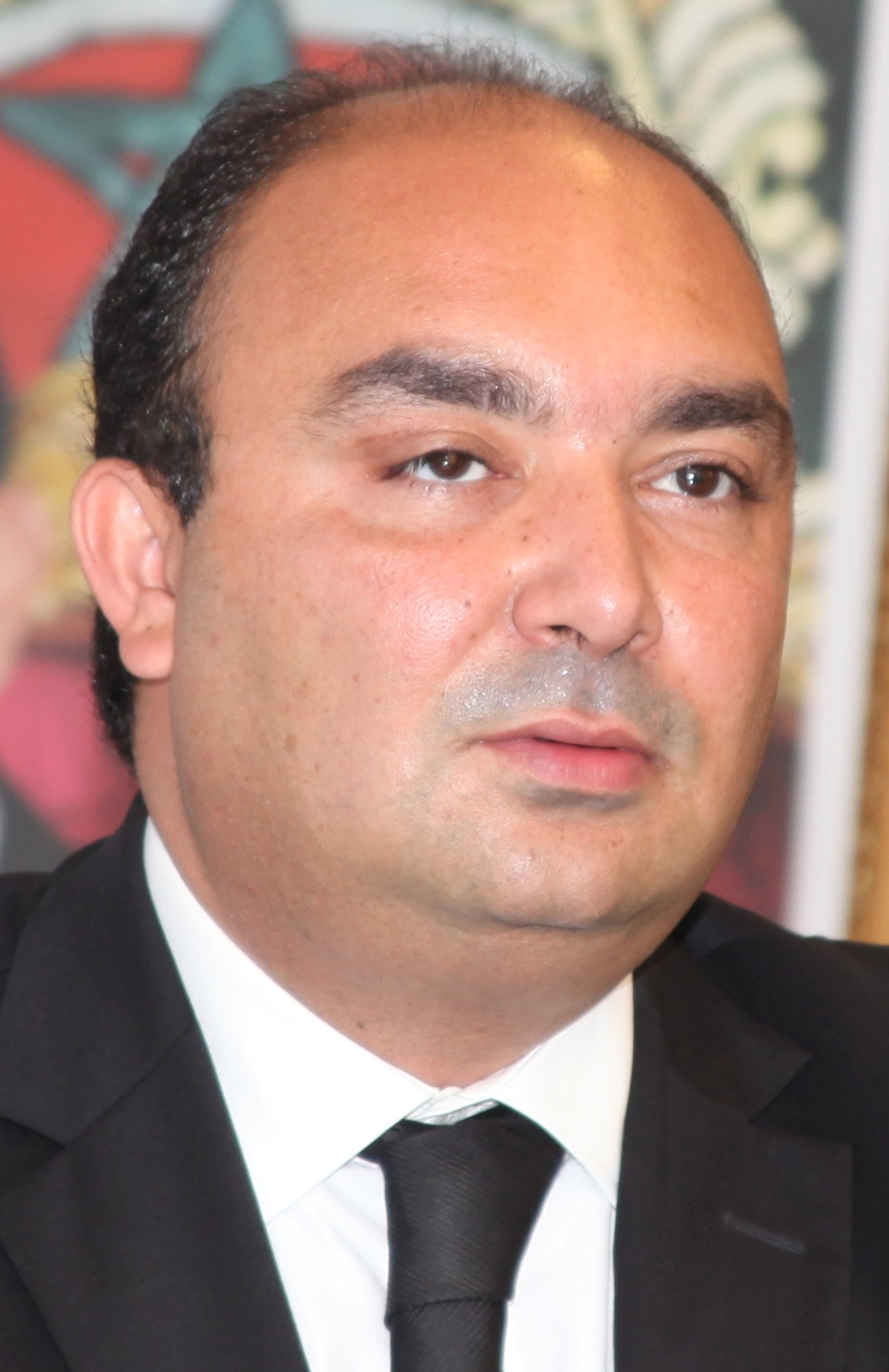
- Moncef Belkhayat during a meeting in Rabat, 2010

Minister of Youth and Sports
- Incumbent
- Assumed office 29 July 2009
- Prime Minister: Abbas El Fassi
- Preceded by: Nawal El Moutawakel

Personal details
- Born: January 28, 1970 (age 56) Rabat, Morocco
- Party: National Rally of Independents
- Education: ISCAE
- Occupation: Politician

Moncef Belkhayat (born 28 January 1970) is a Moroccan entrepreneur who founded and developed various companies in Morocco under the holding H&S. A former politician, he left politics on 26 December 2019 to focus on his various businesses. He served as the minister of youth and sports in Abbas El Fassi's government in 2009.

Born in Rabat, he earned his high school diploma in 1988, going on to graduate from the High Institute of Commerce and Business Administration (ISCAE) in 1992. For the next three years he worked as a sales representative for Procter & Gamble in Morocco. In 1996 he was promoted to regional sales manager in Saudi Arabia, and in 1998 became the development director of Africa and the Middle East. In 2000 he moved on to Meditelecom as sales director. He was appointed CEO of the Atcom subsidiary of Finance.com in November 2007 after refusing a CEO position at Meditelecom.

Belkhayat founded H&S Holding in 2005. As of 2015, the company has sixteen subsidiaries and 1,600 employees, earning 2.8 billion dirhams in revenue.

In 2006, Belkhayat joined Morocco Culture, the association that organizes the annual Mawazine Festival in Rabat. He held the position of festival marketing director between 2007 and 2009. In late 2007, he joined the FUS Committee (Fath Union Sport), a Rabat sports club.

From 2009 to 2011 he served as Minister of Youth and Sports under El Fassi's government. He was elected to the urban commune of Sidi Belyout in 2015. He has also been elected to the Regional Council of Casablanca-Settat, later becoming vice president of the region under the chairmanship of Mustapha Bakkoury.

== See also ==
- National Rally of Independents
