= Nyahururu =

Coordinates: 0°2′N 36°22′E

Nyahururu Thomson's Falls
- Town
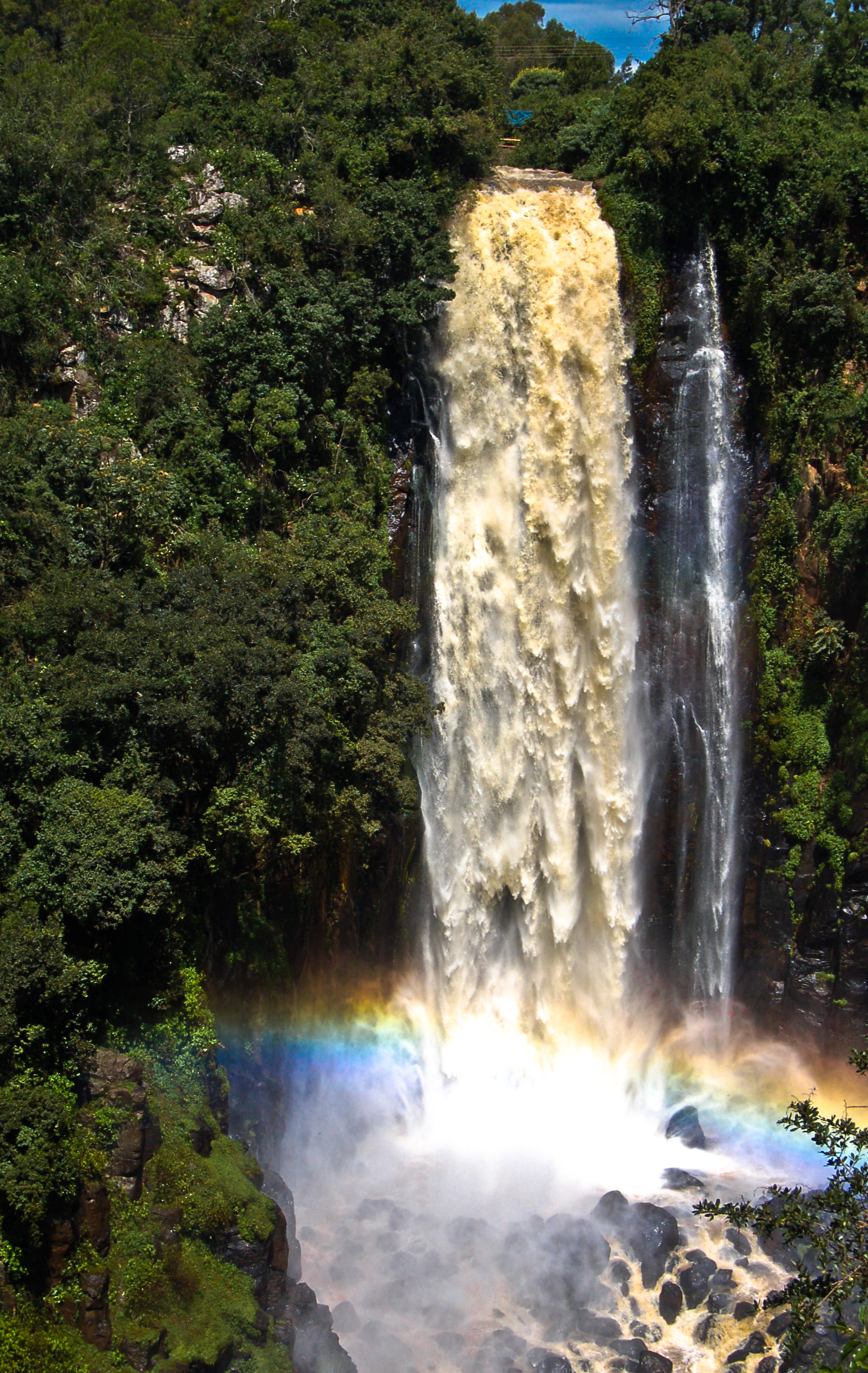
- Thomson's Falls in Nyahururu.
- Interactive map of Nyahururu
- Country: Kenya
- County: Laikipia County
- Nyahururu Sub County: Nyahururu Municipal Board
- Elevation: 2,303 m (7,556 ft)

Population
  - Total: 58,943

Nyahururu (previously named Thomson's Falls) is a town in Kenya, lying north east of Nakuru. Nyahururu means waterfall or windy or place of storms, in the Maasai language. It is located in both Laikipia County and Nyandarua counties. Nyahururu formerly functioned as the administrative capital of Nyandarua District, before it became a county and the headquarters were moved to Ol Kalou.The town has an estimated urban population of 36,450. The town still continues to be a central economic power of the immediate former district of Nyandarua. For that reason, the town has strong economic ties to the two counties.

== History ==
The town was founded as Thomson's Falls, being named after the 74-metre-high (243 ft) Thomson's Falls on the Ewaso Narok river, a tributary of the Ewaso Nyiro River, which drains from the Aberdare mountain ranges. It is at the Junction of Ol Kalou-Rumuruti road and the Nyeri-Nakuru road. Settlers were more interested in the rich lands of the neighbouring environments. Lord Maurice Egerton had the largest allocation of land neighbouring the town. The town grew around a railway from Gilgil, opened in 1929. While the railway fell into disuse in the early 1980s it was revived in 2026. The town was once an important player in the timber milling industry, and the now defunct National Pencil Company had a factory there. It is also an important milk processing hub.

== Economy and people ==
The region around Nyahururu is mainly agricultural. To the North, Ol Ngarua is famous for its maize, while Shamata to the south is a major producer of potatoes. Lately, flower farming has brought new life to Nyahururu. The cool temperate weather, land availability and cheap labour may be some of the attractions to flower farming.

The town is also a commercial centre. It has several supermarkets and large banks. The town has a number of hotels.

The town heavily relies on the transport industry. There are major highways linking the town to Nairobi, Nakuru and Nyeri. Most of these roads are now in good condition and paved. The long dormant railway line was also revived by Kenya Railways in 2026, with a twice a week service for passengers and goods.

Nyahururu is frequented by marathon and cross-country runners before major events due to its high altitude.

Samuel Wanjiru, the Olympic Marathon Record holder and the first Kenyan to win the Marathon at the Olympics, called Nyahururu home until his death on May 16, 2011. Other notables from Nyahururu are Bedan Karoki, John Ngugi and Godfrey Gitahi Kariuki.

== Education ==
Laikipia University has two campuses, one(main) in the outskirts of the town, and a campus within the town(currently closed). It also has several highly sought-after private schools. It has a National Polytechnic located on the outskirts of the town, on the way to Ol Kalau, two medical colleges, Nyahururu Medical Training College (NMTC) and Kenya Medical Training College (KMTC). Some of the large private schools within Nyahururu Town are Nyahururu Highway Schools, Busara Forest View Academy and Nyahururu Elite Schools. Large public schools include Nyandarua Boarding Primary School, District Education Board, Bishop Louis Ngarenarok, Ndururumo High School, Nyahururu Boys High School, and Ndururi High School.

The Pan African School of Theology, an evangelical theological college founded in 2006, is located near the town. Another Bible school is the Emmanuel Bible Institute. The Institute offers diplomas and certificates in theology.

== Religion ==
Nyahururu is predominantly Christian, with Catholic and Protestant churches. Redeemed Gospel Church is one of the major Pentecostal Churches with its Regional Headquarters in town and many other branches in the outskirts.

== Incidents ==
In 2010, Nyahururu was the site of an internationally reported incident in which police rescued a woman who was under threat of lynching after she shoplifted two Bibles from a supermarket.

In September, 2008, residents of the town were shocked to see a blanket of hail resembling snow covering their land following a thunderstorm. "I have not seen such a thing ever since I was born," said one surprised resident of Nyahururu. Cold weather kept the hailstones from melting quickly, as hail usually does in western Kenya.

== See also ==
- List of cities and towns in Kenya by population
