= Masinde Muliro University of Science and Technology =

Public university in Kenya

- Type: Public
- Established: 2007
- Chairperson: Dr. Pamela Sitienei
- Chancellor: Dr. Peter Wanyaga Muthoka
- Vice-Chancellor: Prof. Solomon Igosangwa Shibairo
- Students: 25,000
- Location: Webuye-Kisumu Road, PO Box 190 Kakamega 50100 Kakamega Kenya, Kakamega; 0.2924°N 34.7622°E
- Campus: 133 acres (54 ha)

Masinde Muliro University of Science and Technology

or MMUST, formerly Western University College of Science and Technology, is a profit public university in Kenya. The university is named after Masinde Muliro, a Kenyan politician who helped found the institution. It has approximately 25,000 students across its branches: Main Campus (Kakamega Town) and its two satellite campuses, Webuye Campus and Bungoma Campus.

== History ==
MMUST became a fully accredited public university in 2007. Before being elevated to full university status, it was a constituent college of Moi University.The school was established in January 1972, known as Western College or WECO, a college of arts and applied sciences awarding certificates and diplomas in technical courses.

In 2002 it became a constituent college of Moi University and changed its name to Western University College of Science and Technology. The university is open to the community to use its resources e.g. the library and other facilities.

Prof. Fredrick Otieno served as vice chancellor for a five-year term. He was succeeded in an acting capacity by Prof. Joseph Bosire, after which Prof. Solomon Shibairo assumed the position of vice chancellor.

== Academics ==
Officially recognized by the Commission for University Education of Kenya, Masinde Muliro University of Science and Technology (MMUST) offers courses and programmes leading to officially recognized higher education degrees such as pre-bachelor's degrees (i.e. certificates, diplomas, associate or foundation), bachelor's degrees, master's degrees and doctorate degrees in several areas of study. The 15 years old Kenyan higher-education institution has a selective admission policy based on students' past academic record and grades. The admission rate range is 70-80% making this Kenyan higher education organization a somewhat selective institution. International applicants are eligible to apply for enrollment. MMUST also provides several academic and non-academic facilities and services to students including a library, sports facilities, study abroad and exchange programs, online courses and distance learning opportunities, as well as administrative services.

MMUST offers over 400 different academic programmes at the undergraduate and graduate levels across its 11 schools. The schools and departments include:

- Agriculture, Veterinary Sciences and Technology
- Arts and Social Sciences
- Business and Economics
- Computing and Informatics
- Disaster Management
- Education
- Engineering and the Built Environment
- Medicine
- Natural Sciences
- Nursing and Midwifery
- Public Health

== ISO certification ==
ISO 9001:2015 Quality Management System

== Accreditations ==
=== Institutional accreditation ===
- Commission for University Education of Kenya
- TVET Authority

=== Other specialized or programmatic accreditations ===
- Engineers Board of Kenya (EBK)
- Kenya Medical Practitioners and Dentists Board (KMPDB)
- Commission on Collegiate Nursing Education (AACN)
- Association to Advance Collegiate Schools of Business (AACSB International)
- Council on Accreditation of Nurse Anesthesia Educational Programs (AANA)

== Memberships and affiliations ==
- Inter-University Council for East Africa (IUCEA)
- Association of African Universities (AAU)
- African Institute of Capacity Development (AICAD);World Association of Industrial and Technological Research Organizations (WAITRO)
- Institute of Directors Kenya
- Association of Commonwealth Universities (ACU)
- International Association of University Presidents (IAUP)
- African Council for Distance Education (ACDE)

== Notable alumni ==
- Vincent Achuka

== See also ==
- List of universities in Kenya
- Education in Kenya
