= Thomas Cheruiyot =

Kenyan academician

- Citizenship: Kenyan
- Occupation: Academician

Academic background
- Education: Egerton University

Academic work
- Discipline: Agribusiness Manager
- Institutions: University of Eldoret

Thomas Kimeli Cheruiyot is a Kenyan academic and the second vice-chancellor of the University of Eldoret. He has been in office since 2023 to date. He took over from Wilson K. Ng'etich, who served as Acting Vice-Chancellor from 9 June 2023 to 1 September 2023..

== Early life and education ==
Thomas obtained his bachelor's degree at Egerton University in Kenya in 1995. He proceeded to Wageningen University in the Netherlands, where he obtained a Master of Management Sciences in 1999. He later pursued a Ph.D in Strategic Management at Moi University, which he completed in 2010.

== Academic career ==
Thomas served as Head of the Department of Accounting and Finance. He later served as the Dean of the School of Business and Economics and later took on the roles of interim Deputy Vice-Chancellor for Finance and interim Principal at Bomet University College.

In August 2023, he was appointed as the Vice-Chancellor of the University of Eldoret. He took over from Wilson K. Ng'etich, who served as Acting Vice-Chancellor from 9 June 2023 to 1 September 2023..
