= Thomson's Falls =

Waterfall of the Ewaso Ng'iro River, Kenya

Coordinates: 0°02′39″N 36°22′13″E

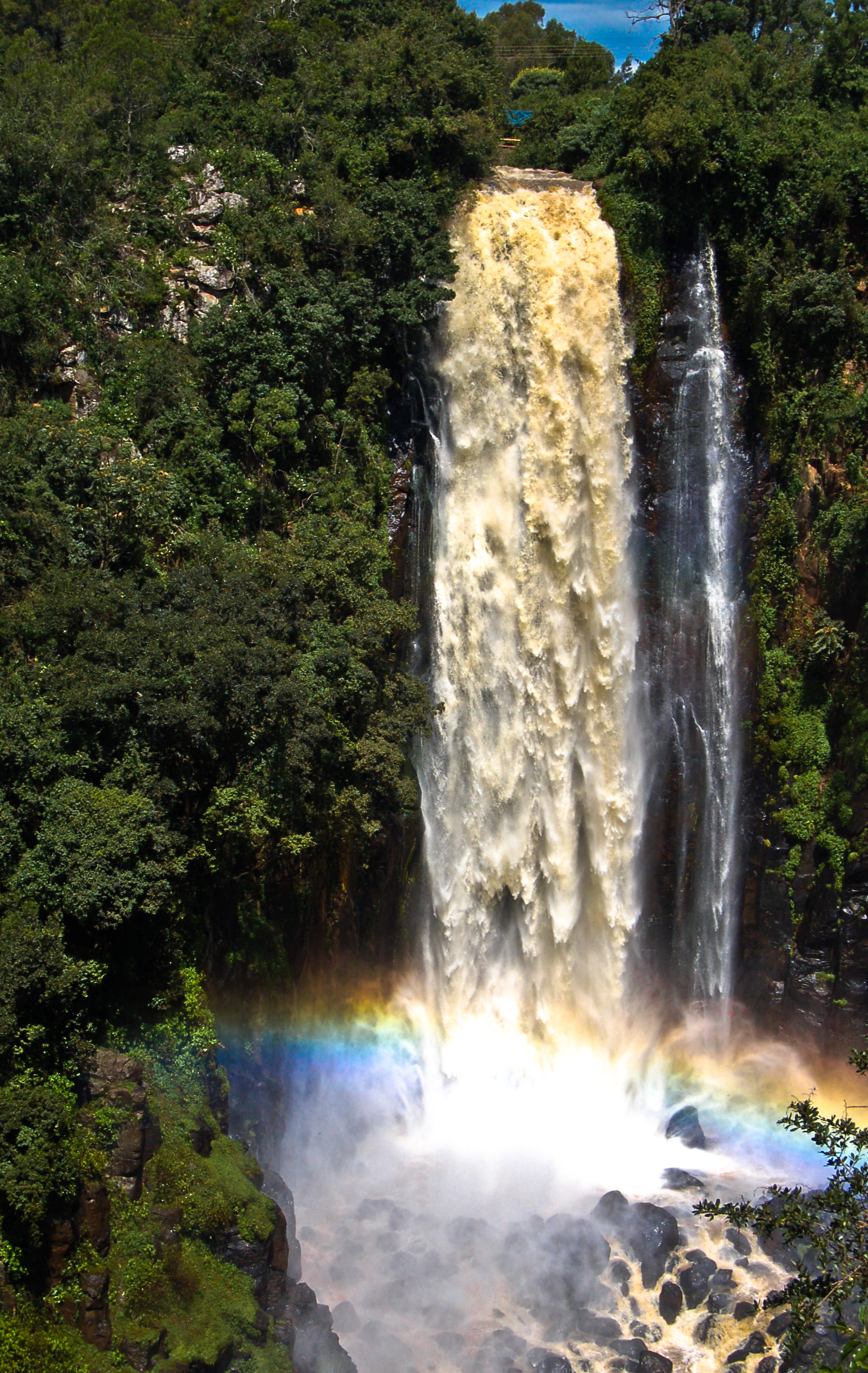
Thomson's Falls.

Thomson's Falls is a 74-metre (243 ft) waterfall on the Ewaso Ng'iro River in Central Rift Valley Kenya, a few kilometres from Lake Ol Bolossat, which drains from the Aberdare Range. It is situated 3 kilometres (2 mi) from the town of Nyahururu, at 2,360 metres (7,740 ft) elevation. In 1883, Joseph Thomson was the first European to reach the waterfall and named it for his father. Thomson wrote:

I was impressed mightily by the stupendous thundering of the waters which in magnificent mass plunged down several hundred feet into a fearful gloomy gorge. ... The crevices give support to a splendid drapery of creepers and bushes, the spray from the waters yielding the necessary sustenance. Among other plants wild bananas are to be seen.

— Joseph Thomson

Thomson was a Scottish geologist and naturalist who became the first European to walk from Mombasa to Lake Victoria in the early 1880s.

The falls are a major economic resource for the adjacent town of Nyahururu. Most of the revenue is received from tourists, both international and domestic, who are charged at the gate.

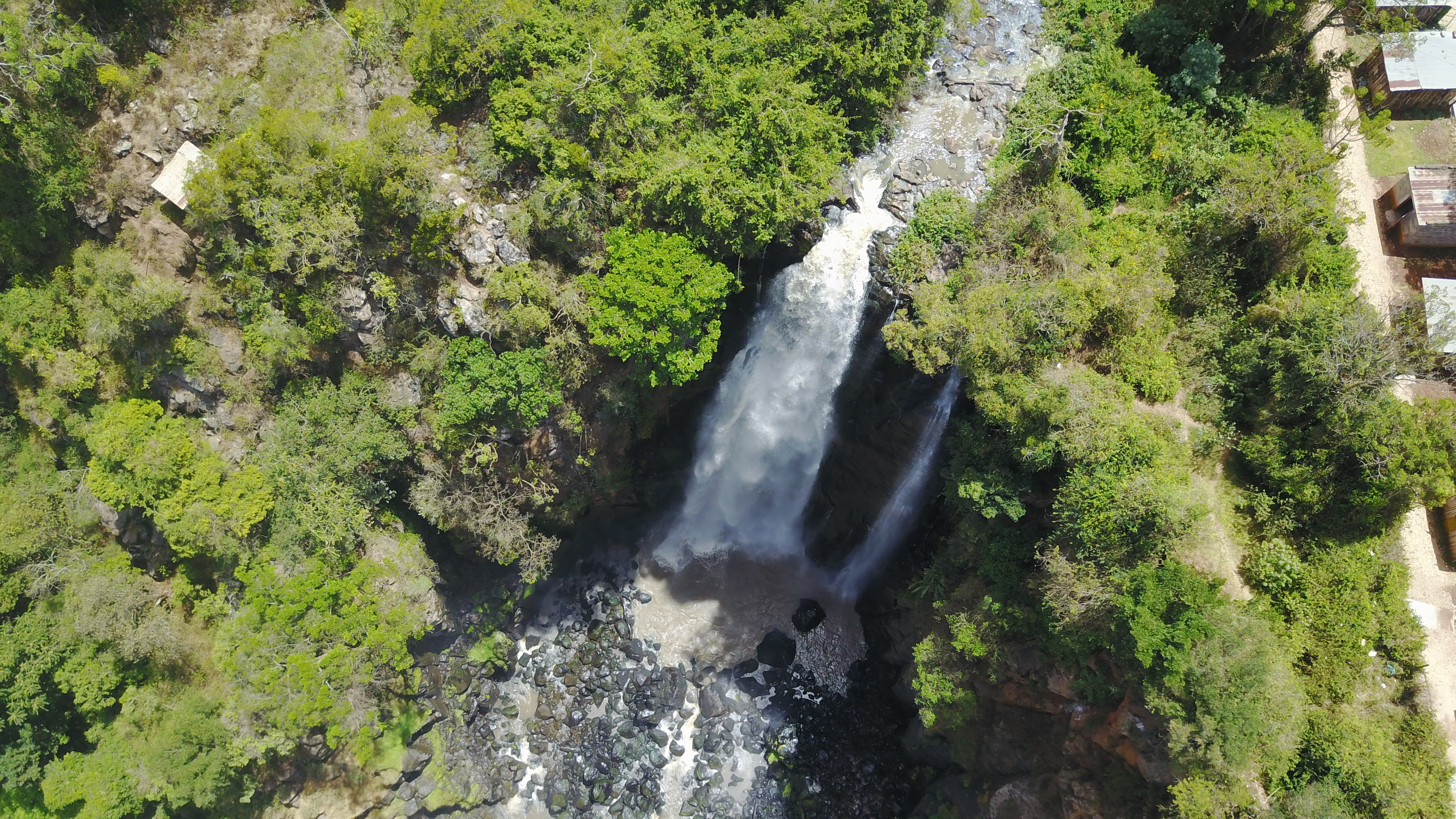
An aerial view of Thompson's Falls

The falls appeared in the TV Movie The Man in the Brown Suit (1988).

== Climate ==
Thomson Falls generally has an oceanic climate. It has rainfall during almost all months of the year.

== Location ==
Thomson’s Falls is located on the outskirts of Nyahururu. Access is by road, a four hour drive from Nairobi.

== See also ==
- List of waterfalls
