= Vincent Achuka =

Kenyan journalist and writer

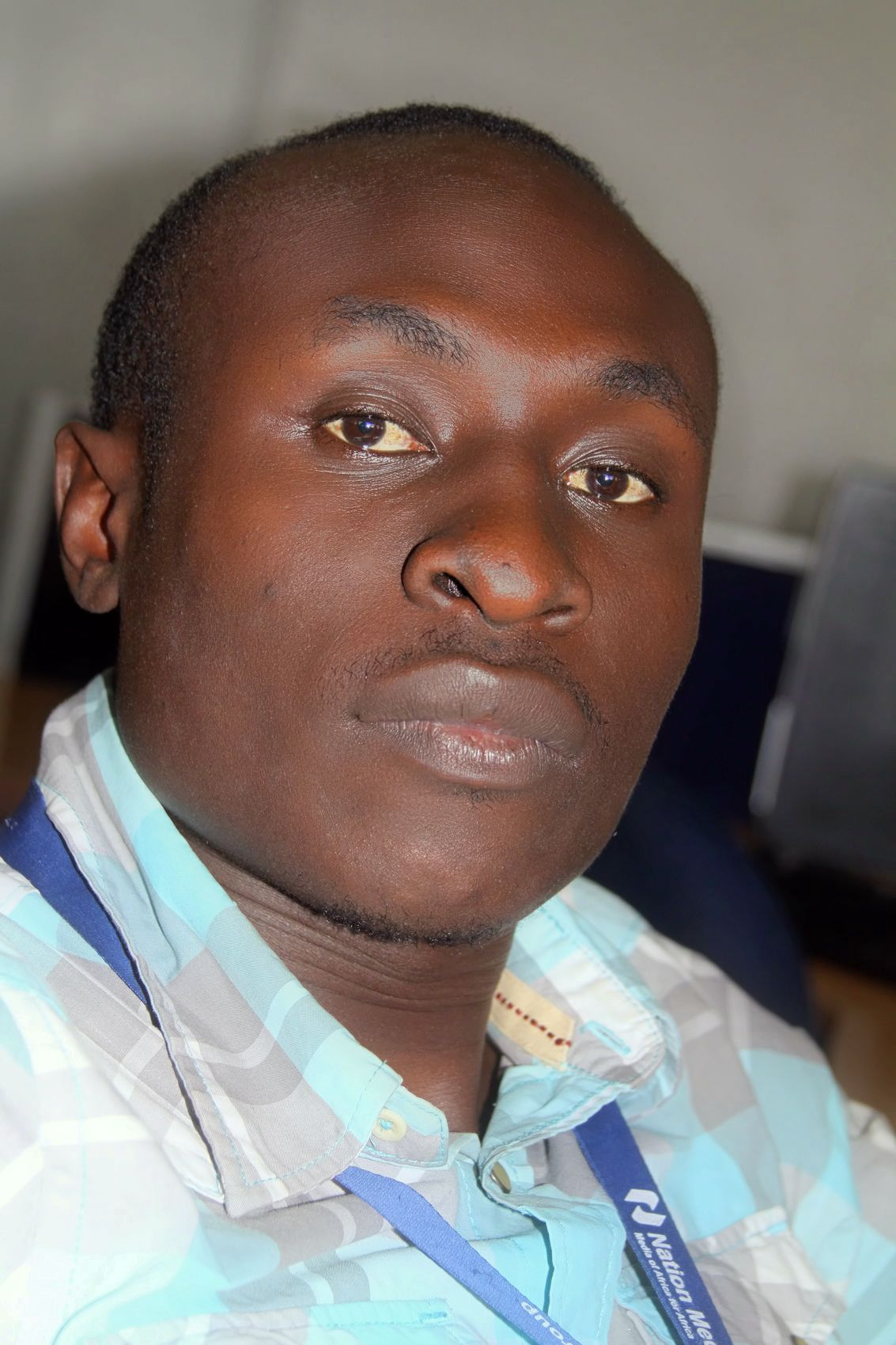

Vincent Achuka is a Kenyan journalist and writer based in Nairobi.

He majors on investigations, analysis and features with specific interests in crime, human interest stories, infrastructure transport, aviation, business and urban trends.

He currently writes for the Saturday and Sunday Standard in Kenya where he moved to in February 2017 after writing for the Sunday Nation, a weekly publication with the largest circulation in East and Central Africa for three years.

The Sunday Nation is owned by the Nation Media Group. The Saturday and Sunday Standard are owned by the Standard Media Group.

Prior to joining the Nation he worked for the Ghetto Mirror, a community newspaper ran by Shining Hope for Communities-an international NGO that focuses on social issues in the informal settlements of Nairobi. In between he freelanced for South Africa's Sunday Times, UKs Think Africa Press and Next City in New York majorly writing features about Kenya's slums.

== Awards ==
His 2014, Achuka was awarded the tourism story of the year in the Annual Journalism Excellence Awards by the Media Council of Kenya for his 2013 “Slum tourism, the new fad for tourists in Kenya,” which talked about the rise of slums as an attraction for tourists and the need for Kenya to regulate and adopt as part of its Vision 2030 objectives as South Africa and India have done.

The same year his investigative story “Gaza, the new teenage killer gang calling the shots in Nairobi’s Eastlands” won first runners up for the good governance reporting award by the Media Council of Kenya.

In 2016, he was awarded by the Media Council of Kenya as the second runners up in the Development Reporting Category during the Annual Media Excellence Awards

He is a 2010 Bachelor of Journalism and Mass Communication graduate of Masinde Muliro University of Science and Technology.
