= Teresia Wairimu =

Kenyan evangelis

Reverend Teresia Wairimū Kìnyanjui
- Native name: Wairimu
- Church: Faith Evangelistic Ministries (FEM)

Personal details
- Born: 15th November, 1957 Waithaka, Nairobi County
- Denomination: Christian
- Residence: Nairobi Kenya
- Parents: Mother-Njeri Kìnūthia Father-Kìnūthia Kìnyanjui
- Children: Robert and Catherine

Teresia Wairimū Kìnyanjui (15 November 1957) is a Kenyan evangelist, the founder and director of Faith Evangelistic Ministries (FEM). She has over 20,000 ministry partners, with offices in Kenya, United States of America (USA) and United Kingdom (UK). She founded FEM in 1989 when charismatic churches emerged as an alternative to the worship in mainstream denominations. Wairimū became the first female preacher to hold regular revival crusades at Uhuru Park grounds.

== Early life and education ==
Wairimū was born on 15 November 1957 in Waithaka, Nairobi County as the second child to Njeri Kìnūthia, and Kìnūthia Kìnyanjui. Her grandfather Kìnyanjui wa Gathirimū was a Paramount Kikuyu Colonial Chief.

Wairimū attended Mūkarara Primary School in Waithaka, Nairobi County from 1964 to 1970 and later joined Ngiriambu Girls' High School in Kirinyaga County from 1971 to 1975.

== Career ==
She worked as a kindergarten teacher and served as a teacher at Christ for All Nations (CFAN) School of Evangelism in Orlando, Florida, training ministers to be effective in ministry.

=== Ministry life ===
Wairimū became a committed Christian in 1977. She founded Faith Evangelistic Ministry (FEM) in 1989, which started from small house gatherings and transitioned to large gatherings at venues like Nairobi’s City Hall, Kenyatta International Convention Centre (KICC), and eventually regular Sunday crusades at Uhuru Park, where she preached on the second Sunday of each month for 14 consecutive years. The ministry has been in existence since 1989. Wairimū was commissioned by German Pentecostal evangelist Reinhard Bonnke in June 1988, after one of his crusades in Kenya, in which "she witnessed the manifestation of God through him".

Her ministry focuses on evangelism and incorporates elements such as healing, miracles, charitable outreach and public preaching, depicting true Pentecostalism. Wairimū emphasizes the practical application of Christian teachings, particularly in contexts of poverty and social need, for instance, the establishment of Kikambala, an orphanage, which functions as a feeding center for orphaned and destitute children.

Wairimū has expanded her Christian ministry activities beyond Kenya to several countries internationally. Her overseas missions have included visits to Uganda, Nigeria, Ethiopia, India, Singapore, Canada, the United States, the United Kingdom, Brazil, Sweden, Norway, South Africa, the Faroe islands and Jamaica. In recognition of her ministry work of evangelism and charitable outreach, Wairimū received the Martin Luther King Peace Award for Africa.

=== Spiritual experience and vision ===
Wairimu recalls having a spiritual vision on July 21, 1985, according to stories from her ministry. She later described that this event marked the start of her religious calling. After that, she participated in ministry activities at Bible studies, small Christian gatherings, schools, and universities. She met evangelist Reinhard Bonnke in Oslo in 1992, an encounter which she describes as a turning point in the growth and development of her ministry.

== Personal life ==
Wairimū was married on 25 November 1978, and has two children, Robert and Catherine, and five grandchildren.

== Selected work ==
- Kinyanjui, T.W. ( 2011). A Cactus in the Desert. Nairobi: Revival Springs Media.
