= PC Kinyanjui Technical Training Institute =

PC Kinyajui Technical Training Institute
- Motto: Excellence in Technology
- Established: 1979
- Location: Nairobi, Kenya
- Chief Principal: Lucy M. Anampiu
- Website: http://kinyanjuitechnical.ac.ke

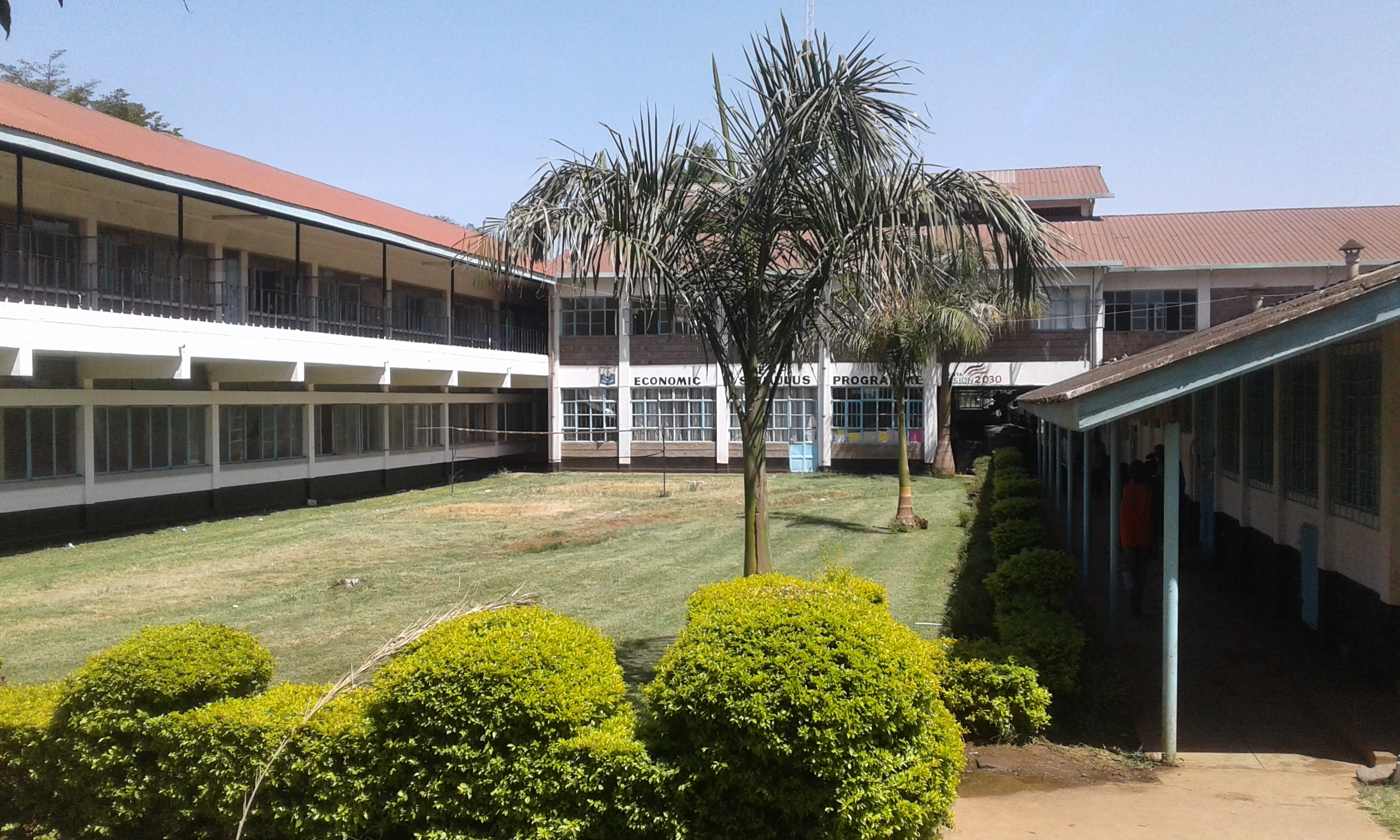
A photo of PC kinyanjui Technical economic stimulus program block

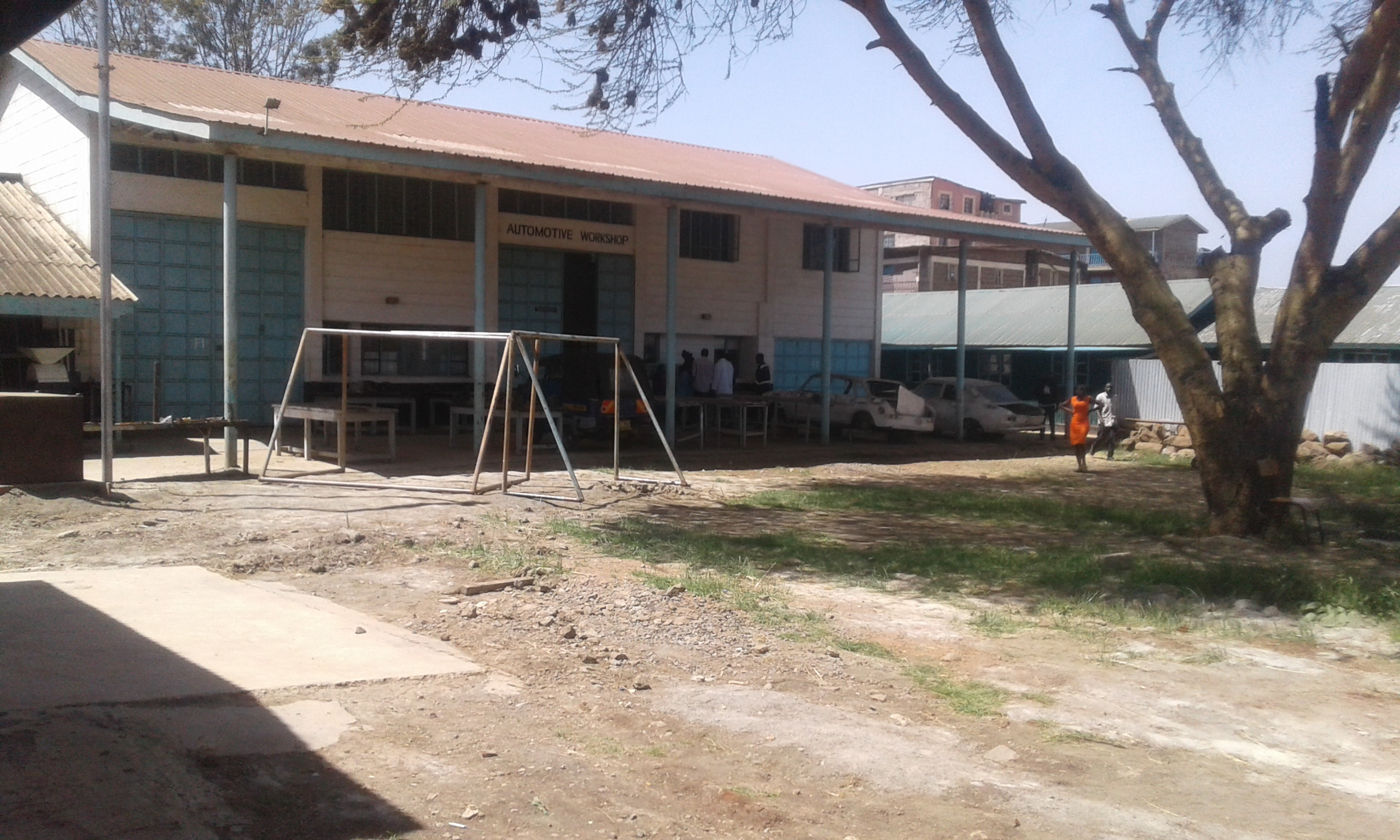
PC Kinyanjui Automotive Workshop

Paramount Chief Kinyanjui Technical Institute (PCKTTI) is a collegiate public, technical institute in Nairobi Kenya. PC Kinyanjui was founded in 1979 with a total of 1,500 students. The vision of starting the school was established by Jomo Kenyatta, the first president of the republic of Kenya. PC Kinyanjui was then upgraded to a technical collegiate institution in 1987 and offers a variety of courses including Engineering education, Business education, Hospitality, ICT. Mr. Simon K. Nyaga is currently the Chief Principal of the Institution. PC Kinyanjui Technical Training Institute is accredited by TVET (Technical and Vocational Education and Training) as a technical training Institution.

== Academic departments and faculties ==
- Mechanical engineering
- Computing and Informatics
- Applied science
- Hospitality
- Building and construction engineering
- Business and Liberal Studies
- Civil and architectural engineering
- Electrical and Electronics Engineering

== Location ==
The PC Kinyanjui Technical Training Institute is located on Kabiria Road in Riruta satellite Dagoretti South Constituency in the county of Nairobi. The school is about 400 m (1,300 ft) from Riruta satellite Police station, next to Orthodox College of Africa and approximately 8.2 km (5.1 mi) from Nairobi's Central Business District.

== History ==
PC kinyanjui was founded in 1979 as a technical secondary school and named Kinyanjui in honour of Kinyanjui wa Gathirimu, who was chief of the area between 1893 and 1929.

== See also ==
- Kibra Technical and Vocational College
- Technical University of Mombasa
- Rift Valley Technical Training Institute
