= National School of Business and Management in Settat =

French business school in Morocco

Coordinates: 33.0000°N 7.6167°W

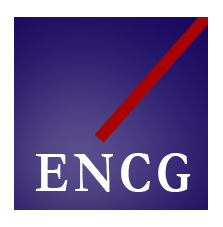
- Other names: ENCG Settat
- Type: Business school
- Established: 1994
- Director: Abdessadeq SADQI
- Location: Settat, Morocco
- Website: encg-settat.ma

The National School Of Business and Management of Settat (in French ENCG Settat) is a public business school, founded in 1994 in Morocco. The school is the first school of the ENCG network. Under the sovereignty of Hassan First University of Settat, it aims to train qualified senior managers with high technical expertise in the areas of commerce, management science, and business administration.

It is ranked best business school in Morocco alongside ISCAE.

== Process of admission ==
The school can be integrated directly after obtaining the Baccalaureate. There is a preliminary selection of the applicants based on their grades. Candidates with grades equal to or above the fixed threshold are then required to pass an exam called TAFEM in four categories: reading, math, French and general culture. The top students will be assigned to their school of choice based on their scores.

== Curriculum ==
The first three years are common root, meaning they are intended to teach freshmen about business in general, accounting, management, etc. The fourth year is when the students are asked to choose their major. The primary majors are Finance and Accounting, Auditing and Management Accounting and Marketing.

== School life ==
Students can choose to enroll in one of these five year programs: "Business School Programme Marketing & communication", "Business School Programme Finance & accounting management", and "Business School Programme: Audit & management control". Students also have the option to partake in the "Executive MBA" course, which requires bi-weekly attendance and lasts for eighteen weeks.
