= University of Eldoret =

University in Kenya

University of Eldoret(formerly Chepkoilel University College)
- Motto: Flame of Knowledge and Innovation
- Type: Public
- Established: Founded in 1956 by the white settlers as a Large Scale Farmers Training Centre.
- Endowment: 20,300
- Chancellor: Prof. Judith Mbula Bahemuka
- Vice-Chancellor: Prof. Thomas Kimeli Cheruiyot
- Undergraduates: 25,000+
- Postgraduates: 8,000+
- Location: Eldoret, Kenya
- Campus: Urban, Town Campus,
- Website: www.uoeld.ac.ke

University of Eldoret is one of the 22 public universities in Kenya and situated approximately 9 km along the Eldoret-Ziwa road in Eldoret town, Uasin Gishu County. It was founded in 1946 by the white settlers as a Large Scale Farmers Training Centre. In 1984, it was converted to a teachers’ training college and renamed Moi Teachers’ Training College to offer Diploma Science Teachers Training. Due to the double intake crisis, the college was taken over by Moi University as a campus in 1990, renaming it Chepkoilel Campus. From 1990, the university made it a campus of Natural, Basic and Applied Science programmes.

In August 2010, President Mwai Kibaki, through Legal Notice No. 125 of 13 August 2010 upgraded the campus into a University College with the name Chepkoilel University College, a Constituent College of Moi University. Upon the award of charter by the president in March 2013, the University College was renamed University of Eldoret.

== Schools/Faculties and Departments ==
The university has the following schools;

- Agriculture and Biotechnology
- Business and Management Sciences
- Education
- Engineering
- Environmental Studies
  - Environmental Studies – Arts
  - Environmental Studies – Science
- Human Resource Development
- Natural Resource Management
- Science
- Economics

The University on Friday 7 February 2013 added its first campus in Eldoret town-Town campus-Housing School of Environmental studies Human Resource Business and management sciences Education (Arts)

== Graduation ==
- Held its First Graduation Ceremony on 3 December 2013 at the University Sports Pavilion
- Held its Second Graduation Ceremony on 28 November 2014 at the University Sports Pavilion
- Held its Third Graduation Ceremony on 27 November 2015 at the University Sports Pavilion
- Held its Fourth Graduation Ceremony on 25 November 2016 at the University Sports Pavilion
- Held its Fifth Graduation Ceremony on 24 November 2017 at the University Sports Pavilion

== See also ==
- List of universities in Kenya
- Education in Kenya
