= Machakos Institute of Technology =

College in Machakos, Kenya

The Machakos Institute of Technology (MIT) is a private institute in Machakos, Eastern Province, Kenya. MIT has nine schools with an emphasis on social work, community development, and scientific and technological research.

MIT was founded in 2008 in response to the expansion in primary and secondary education in Kenya and a lack of corresponding increase in mid-level training colleges and universities. This led to the inability of majority of KCSE school leavers to access training, leading to a huge training gap.

The institute offers short, certificate, diploma and advanced diploma courses, and runs consultancy services.

== Academics ==
=== Schools ===
MIT is divided into Thirteen Schools:

- School of Social Work & Community Development
- School of Business Education
- School of Applied and Health Sciences
- School of Computing and Information Technology
- School of Fashion and Design Technology
- School of Hospitality & Tourism Management
- School of Information Science
- School of Accounts and Finance
- School of Engineering
- School of Architecture and Building Technology
- School of Hairdressing and Beauty Therapy
- School of Counseling and Psychology
- School of Media and Journalism
