= Rift Valley Technical Training Institute =

Public technical training institute in Kenya

- Rift Valley Technical Training Institute
- Former names: Rift Valley Technical and Trade High School
- Motto: Technology and Innovation
- Type: Public
- Established: 1962
- Affiliations: TVET
- Chairman: Prof. David Some
- Principal: Mrs. Loice Yator
- Academic staff: 214
- Administrative staff: 17
- Students: 9917
- Location: Eldoret, Uasin Gishu County, Kenya; 0°30′18″N 35°18′17″E
- Campus: Urban
- Language: English, Swahili
- Colors: Gold, Blue and White
- Nickname: RVTI, Techie
- Website: rvti.ac.ke

Rift Valley Technical Training institute (RVTTI) is a public technical training institute located in the highland city of Eldoret, Kenya. It is one of the Technical Training Institutes in Kenya. The institution offers Artisan, Craft, Diploma and Higher Diploma Courses with bias to practical industrial applications.

== History ==
The institution started in 1962 as a technical and trade school. In 1979, it was given high school status and began A- level courses in mathematics, physics and chemistry. In 1986, the school was elevated further to become the regions first technical training institute. The Institution has continuously grown and in recognition to this sustained prosperity, it was nominated in 2013 to be an East African Community Center of Excellence in TVET. In 2016, the institution became a UNESCO-UNEVOC network centre, the only TVET institution to have such recognition in East and Central Africa. RVTTI was chosen among the pilot institutions for the Competency-based education and training programme(CBET) and had the first cohort join three programmes in January 2019.

== Research ==
Since 2012 RVTTI annually holds an International conference with themes surrounding Technical and Vocational Education. It also publishes two journals namely; Kenya Journal of Technical and Vocational Education and Training (KJ-TVET) and Africa Journal of Technical and Vocational Education and Training (AfriTVET).

== Departments ==
Rift Valley Technical Training institute (RVTTI), has 8 Admitting departments. These are

- Mechanical Engineering Department
- Building and Civil Engineering Department
- Business and Liberal Studies Department
- Electrical and Electronics Engineering Department
- Hospitality and Institutional Management Department
- Information Communication Technology Department
- Health and Applied Sciences Department
- Department of Agriculture

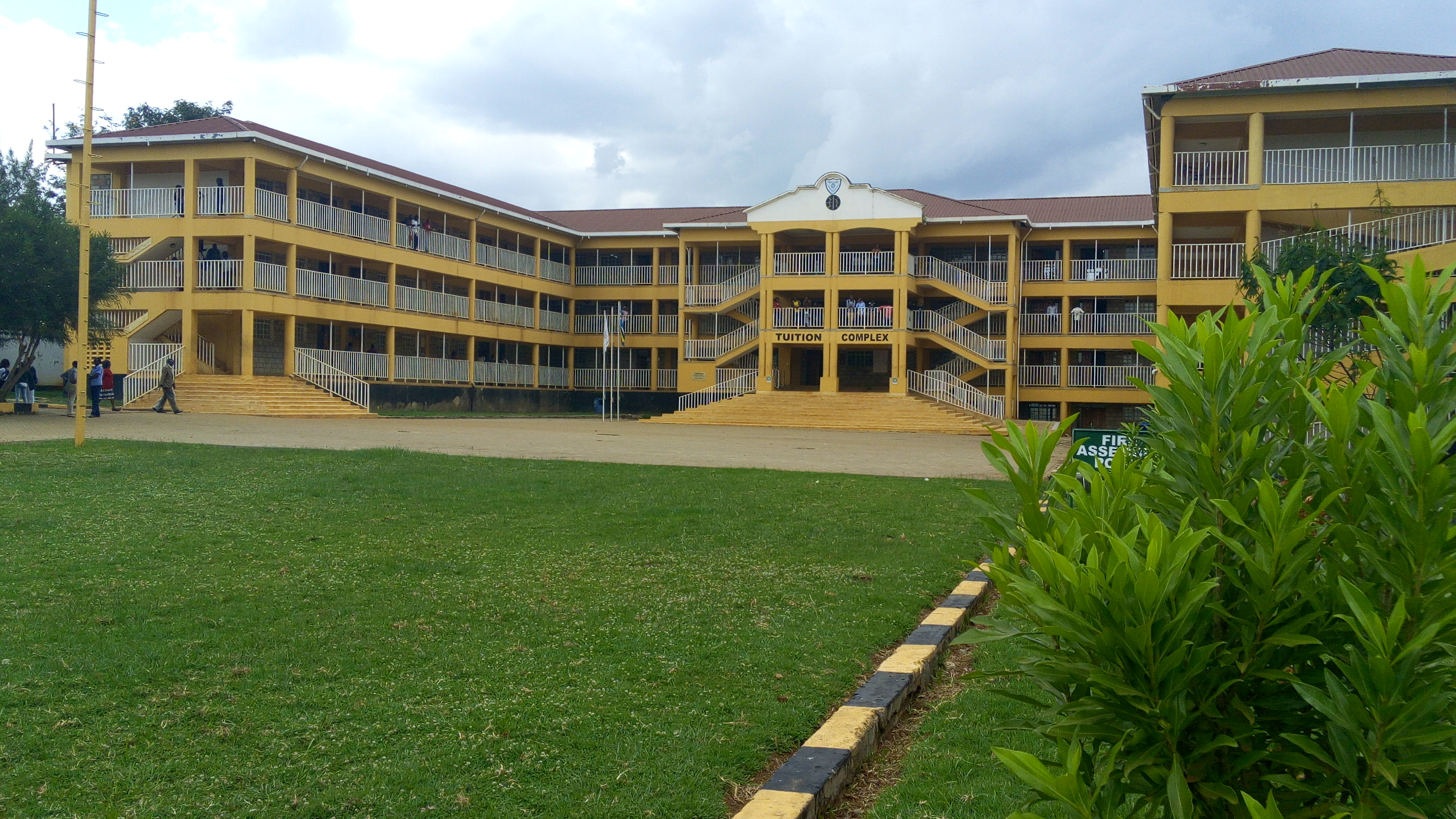
Tuition complex at the Main Campus

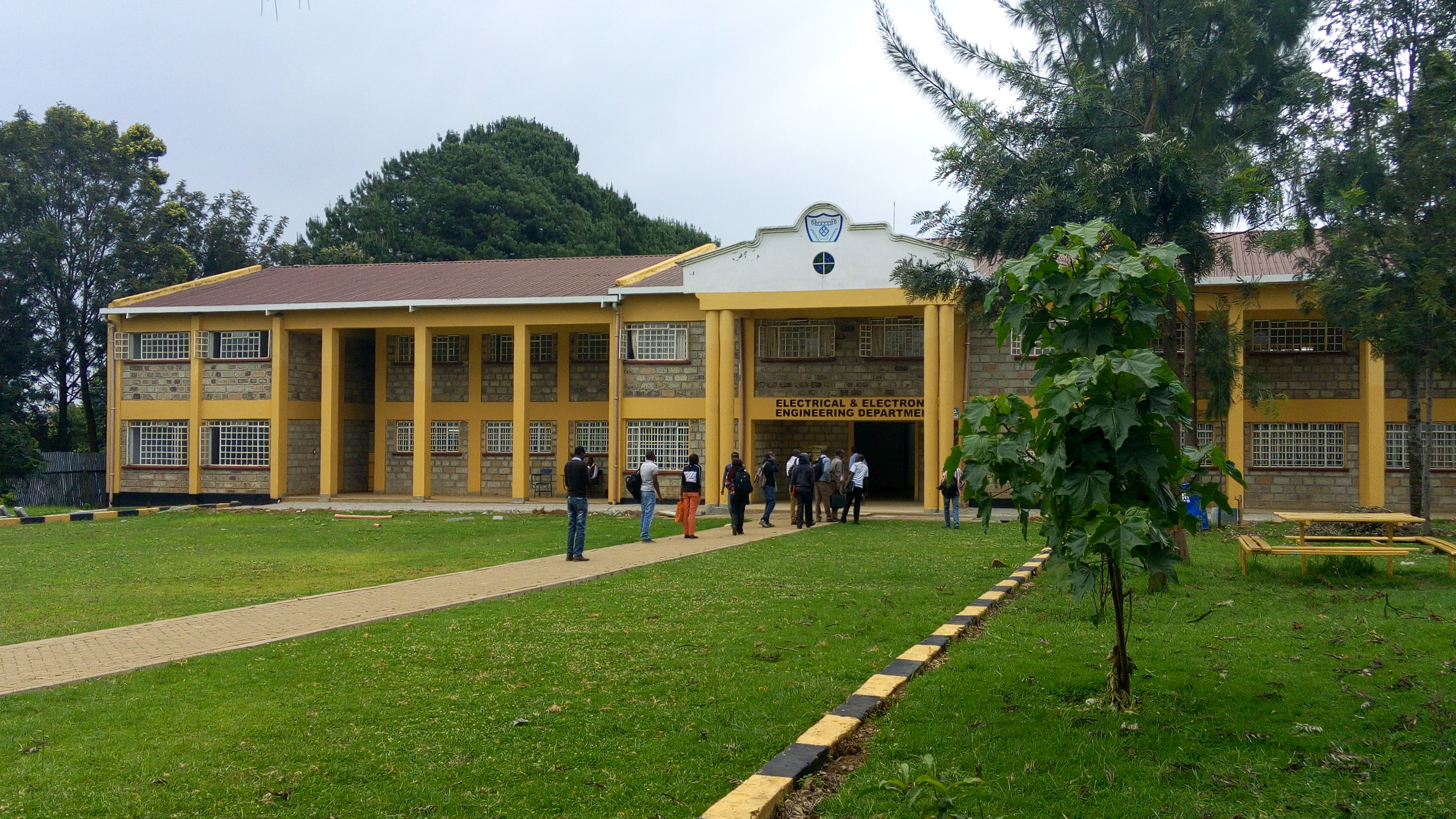
Electrical and Electronics Engineering Department Complex

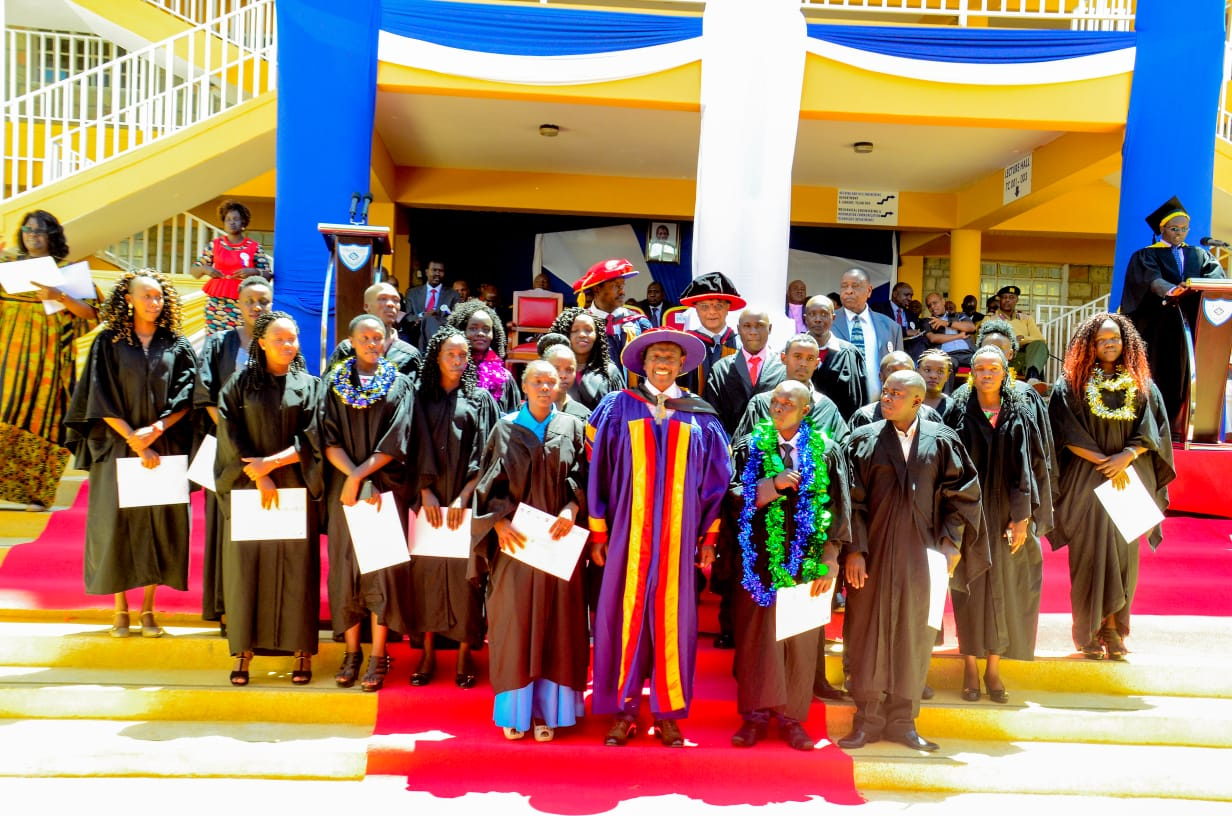
HE Hon Dr William Ruto and PS VTT Dr Kevit Desai Poses with Top Students during 9th Graduation Ceremony

== Directorates ==
- Industrial Attachment and Liaison Center
- ICT Infrastructure
- Performance Contracting
- Quality and Information Security Management
- Examination Department
- Research Innovation and Development
- e-Learning and External linkages

== Facilities ==
The institution has numerous facilities catering for the various technical programs being offered. These include a Sizable State of art Library Complex with a seating capacity of 700, an E-library with seating capacity of 60, Three Conference Halls, Three Restaurants, Several Labs for Bio Chemical Practicals, ICT, Mechanical Engineering, Automotive Engineering, Electrical Engineering, Building and Civil engineering, and several lecture rooms some equipped with Smart Boards. The institution also has two smart classrooms which offer advanced engineering exposure in the fields of Mechatronics and Renewable energy. The smart classrooms where equipped by Devotra with funding from the ministry of education.

The institution also has facilities for sports including a standard sized football pitch, a basketball Court, a volleyball pitch, a rugby pitch, and a netball pitch.

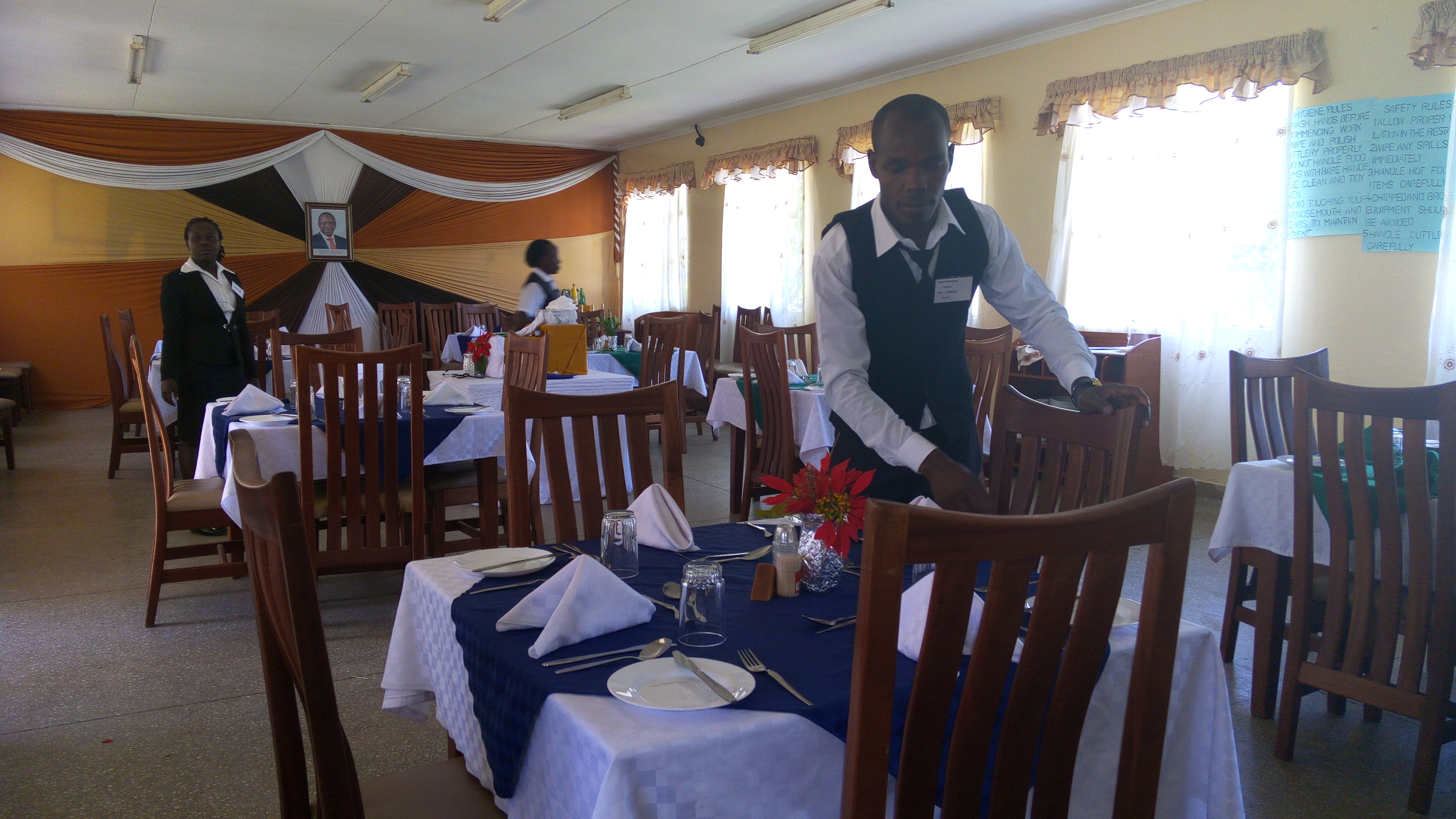
Food and Beverage students setting tables in their training restaurant

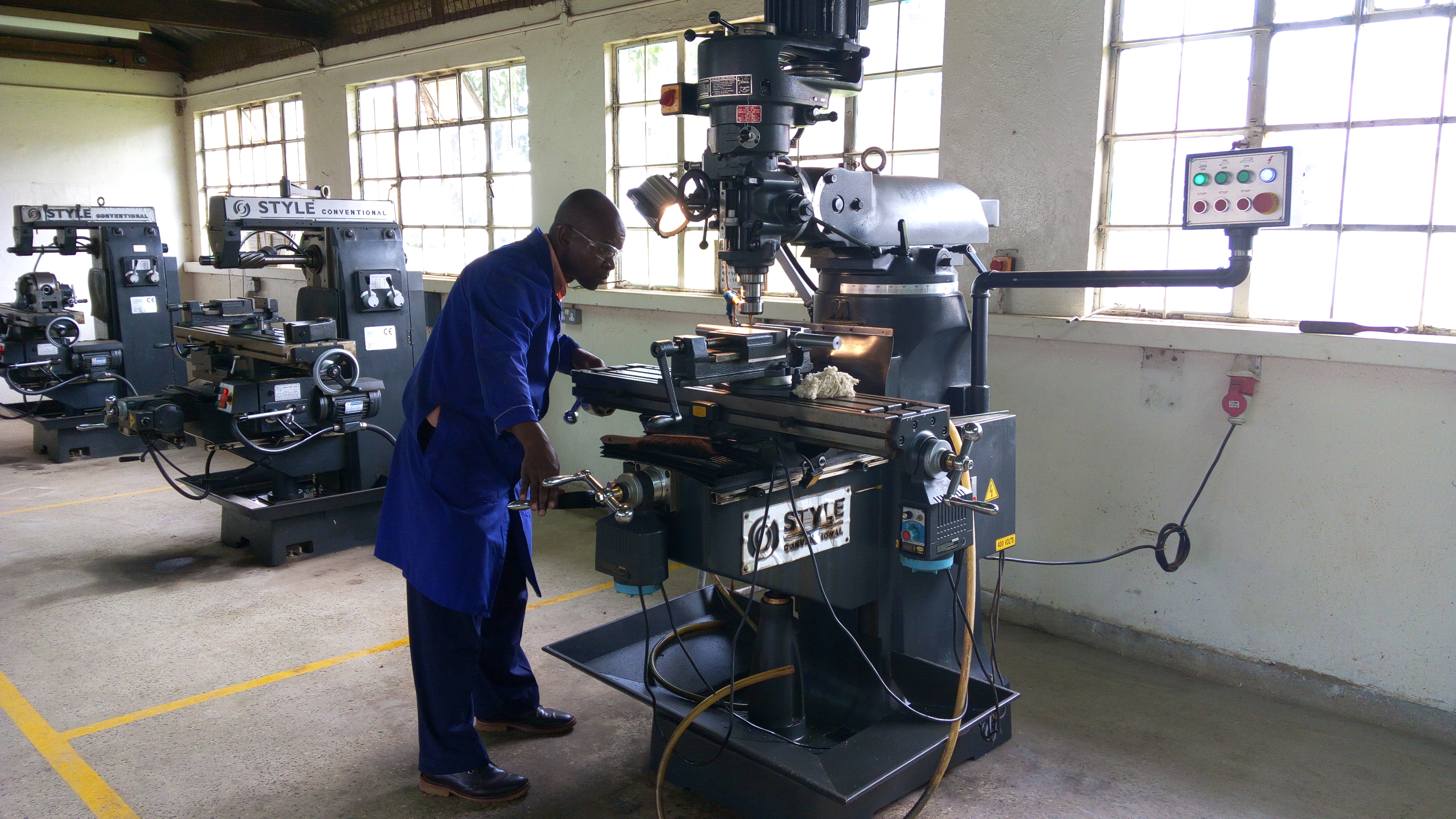
A Technician operating a CNC Milling Machine in one of the Labs

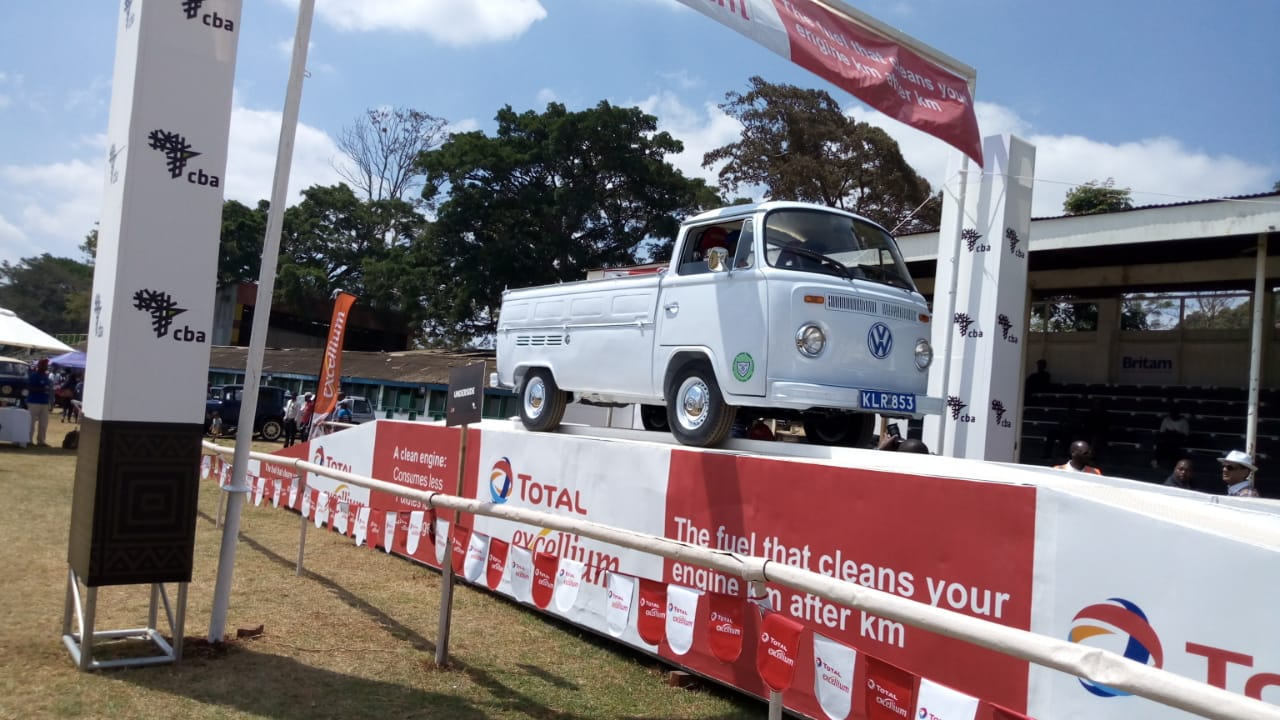
Institute's 1970 VW Kombi pick up during 2019 CBA Concours d'Elegance

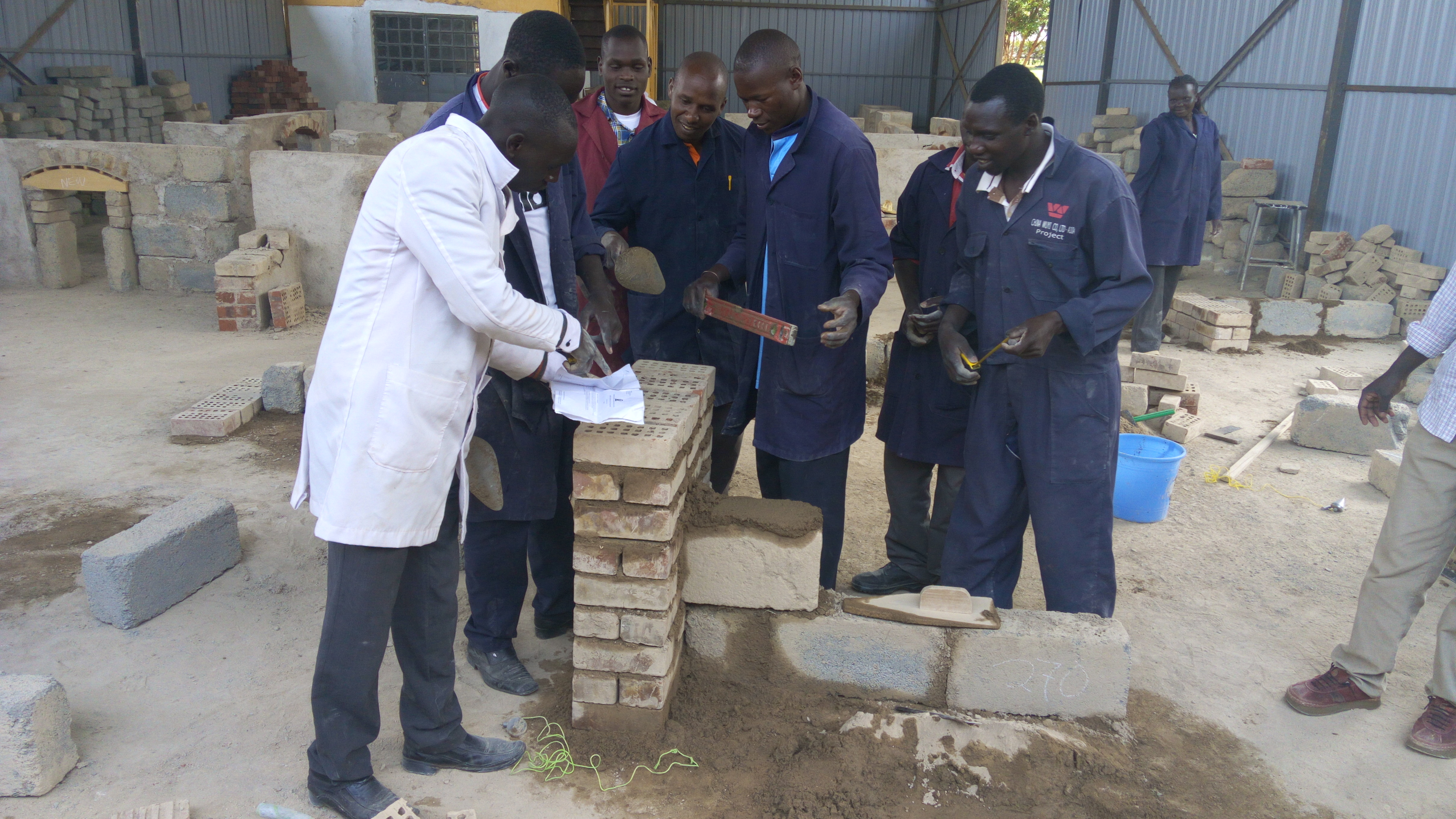
Students taking instructions at the Building and Civil Engineering Lab

== Campuses ==
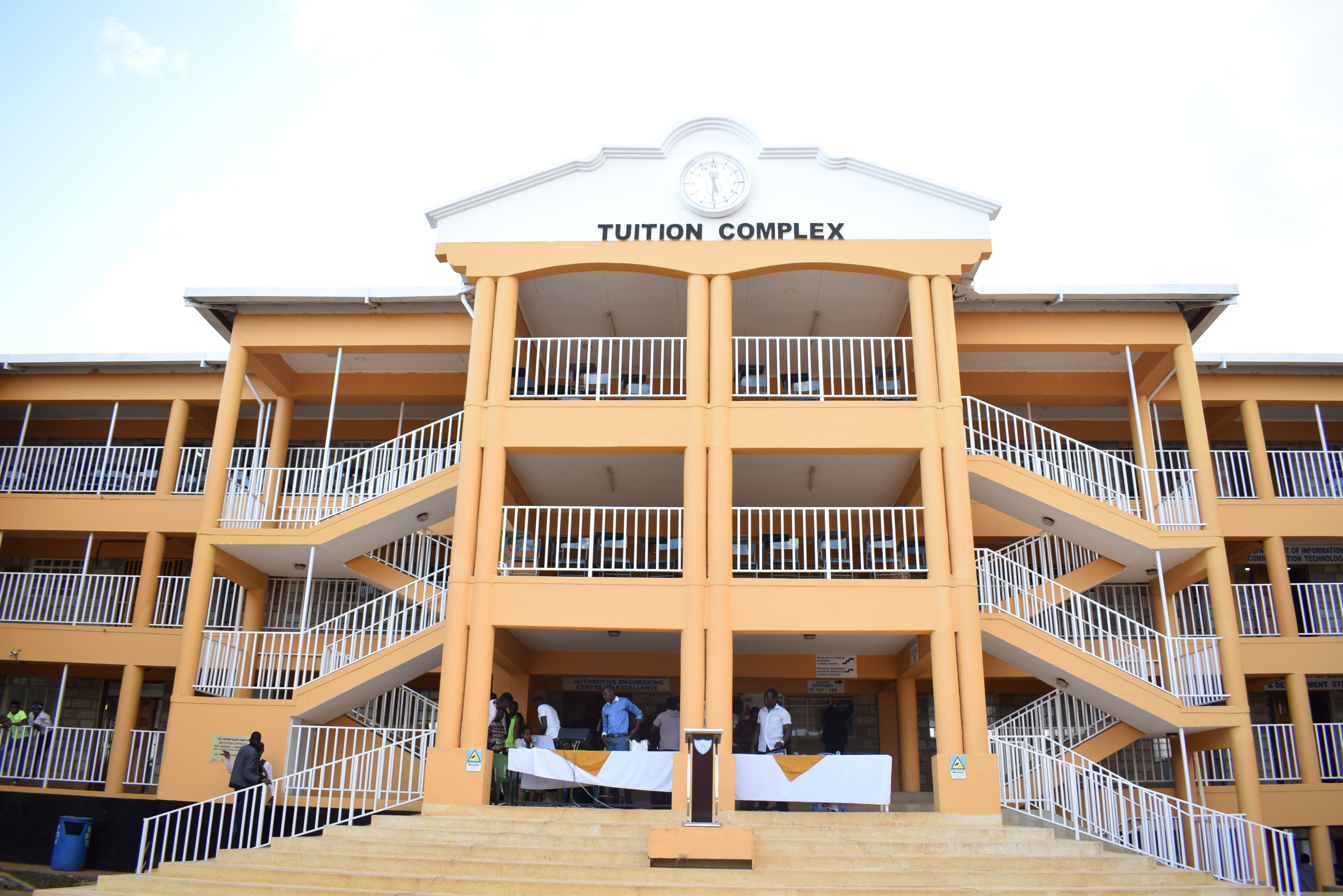
- Main Campus, Eldoret, Opposite KCC
- TIaty Campus

== See also ==
- African Rift Valley
- Education in Kenya
- List of universities and colleges in Kenya
- Universities in Kenya
- Vocational education
