= Kinyanjui wa Gathirimu =

Kikuyu chief in Kenya (1865–1929)

Paramount Chief Kìnyanjui Gathirimu
- Born: Kinyanjui wa Gathirimu c. 1865; Present day Kandara
- Died: 1929; Kikuyu, Kiambu District, Colony and Protectorate of Kenya
- Other name: Chief Kinyanjui
- Awards: King's Medal for Chiefs

Kìnyanjui wa Gathirimu (c. 1865 – 1929) was a Kikiyu leader. He was a member of the Kikuyu people, who was later appointed paramount chief.

== Early life ==
Kìnyanjui wa Gathirimū was born in presented day Kiria in Murang'a County around 1865.

The son of Wanūgū wa Gathirimū, he traced his roots to the Mbarĩ ya Gathirimū sub-clan, long revered for its association with Kikuyu prophets. His granddaughter is Teresia Wairimū, the founder of Faith Evangelistic Ministry.

Kìnyanjui was criticized and disowned by relatives for impregnating many women and causing financial hardship for his family.

== Career ==
In the town of Kiambu, he found refuge with his distant relative, Waiyaki Wa Hinga, a respected and wealthy elder. He was assigned to be a servant. He later entered the service of the Imperial British East Africa Company as a porter and translator for trading caravans in 1890.

He would accompany Waiyaki to see William J. Purkiss of the Imperial British East Africa Company, who was in charge at Fort Smith in Kikuyu. During a dispute with Purkiss, Waiyaki was wounded and taken prisoner. Kìnyanjui assumed the role of the first "chief" among the Kikuyu after the elder died at Kibwezi on his way to exile. The Kikuyu were governed by a local leader or elder, chosen by the people, before the Europeans arrived and introduced the concept of chiefs.

Kìnyanjui supported the British company's successive officers as a mercenary following the 1892 death of Waiyaki Wa Hinga. When Francis George Hall replaced Purkiss, Kinyanjui emerged as a key ally for the new administration, as Hall isolated him and formed a friendship. Hall, stationed at a fort built in Dagoretti, acknowledged him as the headman of Dagoretti, before later founding Fort Smith in Kabete. Kìnyanjui was referred to as Hall's "fidus Achates." Kìnyanjui commanded a Kikuyu faction supportive of the company in Kabete. His growing ties led to roles as an intelligence agent, garrison supplier, and leader of punitive campaigns against Kikuyu groups opposed to the company officials.

In 1895, the British Government established the East Africa Protectorate and entrusted the Imperial British East Africa Company with its administration in 1888. The company quickly opened the Highlands to white settlers. Fort Smith, abandoned in 1899, was replaced by Francis Hall with a new post called Fort Hall (now Mūrang'a) before his death in 1901.

Kìnyanjui advanced by assisting the British in taking Kikuyu land. Beginning in 1902, Kìnyanjui sold land in southern Kiambu to its first white settlers.

Appointed senior chief under the Protectorate government in 1908, he later became the only Kikuyu to hold the title of paramount chief. Kìnyanjui was appointed paramount chief shortly after World War I, a post he retained until his death in 1929.

In 1919, Kìnyanjui chaired what is considered the first formal political meeting among the Kikuyu.

The East Africa Protectorate was transformed into the Colony of Kenya in 1920. Based on his close association with the British Empire, the colonial government later consulted him in the appointment of new chiefs and the introduction of policies. Kìnyanjui received the King's Medal for Chiefs in 1922 for his services to the colonial government. In 1925, the "Paramount Chief of the Agìkūyū" was introduced to King George V, the Duke of York, when the latter visited Kenya.

While visiting Maasailand from January to February 1929, Kìnyanjui leg was pierced by a piece of corrugated iron sheet, leading to a septic wound.

== Death ==
Kìnyanjui wa Gathirimu died on 1 March 1929, in Kikuyu, in Kiambu District in the Kenya Colony at the Thogoto Mission Hospital (now P.C.E.A Kikuyu Hospital).

== Legacy ==
David Gìthanga, the eldest son of the late chief, succeeded him as chief on April 12, 1929.

Chief Kìnyanjui was featured in Robert L. Ripley's Believe It Or Not column in The Washington Herald in November 1936, with a claim of having 400 wives and 380 children.

In the late 1970s, the PC Kìnyanjui Technical Training Institute was named after him.
