= Kenya Institute of Media and Technology =

Private institute in Nairobi, Kenya

The Kenya Institute of Media and Technology (KIMT) is an accredited private institute of higher learning located in Nairobi, Kenya. The institute was founded in 1961. It offers both Technical and Professional courses in Media and Technology.

== Courses offered ==
- Diploma in Radio Programmes Production
- Diploma in Film Video Programmes Production (Camera Option)
- Diploma in Film Video Programmes Production (Sound Option)
- Diploma in Mass Communication (Mass Communication)
- Certificate in Food Production (Food Production)
- Diploma in Food Production (Food Production)
- News Anchoring using Autocues (Media)
- Diploma in Electronics Technology (Electronics Technology)
- Certificate in Electrical Technology (Electrical Technology)
- Certificate in Electronics Technology (Electronics Technology)
- Certificate in Journalism & Mass Communication (Journalism & Mass Communication)
- Diploma in Journalism and Mass Media Communications (Journalism)
- Diploma in Mass Communication & Journalism (Mass Communication & Journalism)
- Diploma in Telecommunication Engineering (Telecommunication Engineering)
- Diploma in Journalism and Media Studies (Journalism and Media Studies)
- Higher Diploma in Journalism/Mass Communication
- Diploma in Disaster Management (Disaster Management)
