= Sup de Co Marrakech =

Coordinates: 31°39′9.4″N 8°1′5.96″W

Sup de Co Marrakech (KMR Holding Pédagogique)
- Type: Private
- Established: 1987
- President: KABBADJ Mohamed
- Location: Marrakesh, Morocco
- Campus: Urban
- Website: www.supdeco.ma

Sup de Co Marrakech (also École supérieure de commerce de Marrakech) is a private five year college based in Marrakesh, Morocco. It was founded in 1987.

Since 2006 the college started a master's degree in business in partnership with Sup de Co Grenoble, France.

The school is affiliated to École supérieure de commerce de Toulouse of France.

== Partnerships ==
Since 1995, the school started to build many partnership programs with international institutions like:

- University of Delaware, Newark, Delaware
- University of St. Thomas, Houston, Texas
- Oklahoma State University, Oklahoma City
- National-Louis University, Chicago, Illinois
- Drexel University, Philadelphia, Pennsylvania
- Elmhurst College, Elmhurst, Illinois
- Temple University, Philadelphia, Pennsylvania
- UQAM, Montreal, Quebec, Canada
- University of Houston, Houston, Texas
