= Kabarak University =

Private Christian university in Kenya

- Other name: KABU
- Motto: Education in Biblical Perspective
- Type: Private university
- Established: September 2002
- Founder: Daniel arap Moi
- Affiliations: African Inland Church
- Chancellor: Gideon Kipsielei Towett Moi
- Vice-Chancellor: Prof. Henry Kiplangat
- Provost: Rev. Mutuku Justus
- Faculty: 280
- Administrative staff: 400
- Students: 12,500
- Undergraduates: 11000
- Postgraduates: 1500
- Location: Nakuru, Rift Valley, Kenya; 0°10′02″S 35°57′58″E
- Campus: Main Campus (Kabarak), Nakuru City Campus
- Colors: White, gold, brown
- Website: www.kabarak.ac.ke
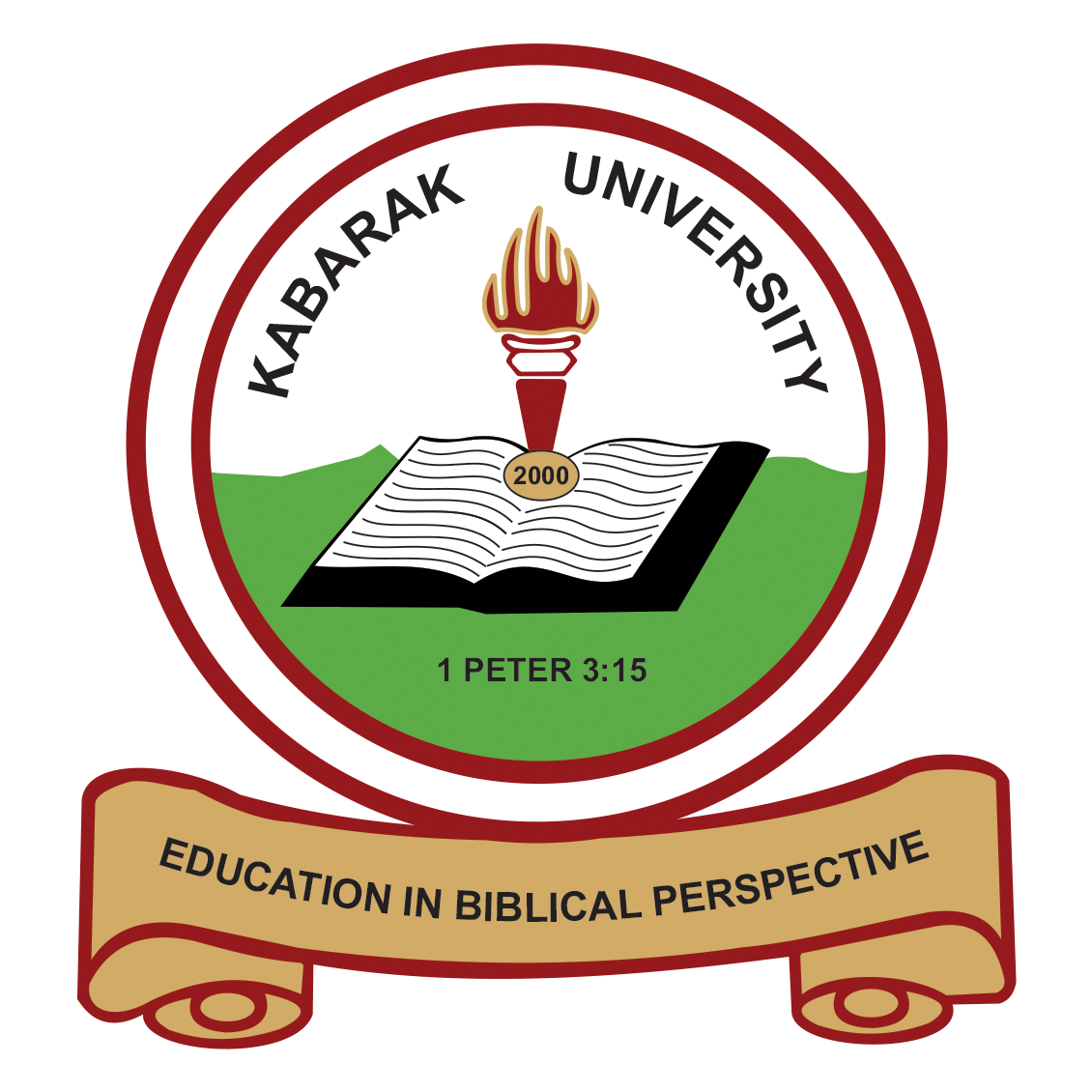

Kabarak University is a private Christian institution of higher education in Kenya. It was founded in 2000 by the second President of Kenya, Daniel arap Moi, and its first students were admitted in 2002. The University is located between Nakuru and Rongai in Nakuru County. The University offers a wide range of courses in various faculties, including business, economics, education, social sciences, music, performing arts, law, pharmacy, medicine, health sciences and pure and applied sciences.

== History ==
Kabarak University was founded as a private Christian university by Daniel arap Moi, the second president of Kenya, near the end of his presidency. The land for the university came from Moi's 3,000-acre (1,200 ha) farm in Kabarak, where he had already established a high school. The university was established in 2000, and admitted its first students in 2002, the same year Moi's presidency ended. He served as the university's founding chancellor until his death in 2020. Moi's son, Gideon, became the chancellor afterward.

Like many new private Kenyan universities, Kabarak started its operation under a Letter of Interim Authority granted by the Government of Kenya. In 2008 the university was awarded its charter and officially accredited.

A range of international collaborations have been set up throughout the 2020s. The 2026 Times Higher Education World University Rankings named Kabarak as the fifth-best university in Kenya, and the top private university in the country.

== Location ==
The main campus of Kabarak University is located 20 kilometres (12 mi) outside Nakuru. There is also a secondary campus in Nakuru city.

== Schools and Institutes ==
- School of Business & Economics
- School of Education, Humanities & Social Sciences
- School of Law
- School of Medicine & Health Sciences
- School of Music & Media
- School of Pharmacy
- School of Science, Engineering & Technology
- Institute of Postgraduate Studies

== Academics ==
All the programs offered by Kabarak University Online are accredited by the Commission for University Education. The university is also fully accredited by the Commission for University Education to offer Fully Online programs.

- Full-Time Programmes
- Part-Time Programmes
- Fully Online Programmes
- ICT Short Courses

== Student activities ==
The university has approximately 5000 students drawn from Kenya and the east African region. Students participate in co-curricular activities, for example:

- Aiesec Kabarak
- Kabarak Crisis Intervention and counsellors Association (KACICA)
- Rotaract Club – Kabarak University
- Christian Union
- Students in Free Enterprise (SIFE)
- I Choose Life – ICL
- Foster National Cohesion (FONACON)
- Drama Club
- Kenya Model United Nations – KABARAK CHAPTER (KMUN)
- Kabarak University Journalism Association of Clarisson
- Kenya Red Cross Society KABARAK CHAPTER
- Itech
- Vision 2030 Kabarak chapter

In sports and games, Kabarak students participate in rugby, football, tennis, hockey, badminton, basketball and swimming.

== Student Organization ==
The student government, which is known as Kabarak University Student Organization (KUSO), is the organ that represents student interests.

== Notable alumni ==
Rosemary Bosibori Onyancha, winner of the 2023 African Union's Continental Best Teacher Award.

== See also ==
- List of universities in Kenya
- Education in Kenya
- Nakuru County
- Commission for University Education
