= Commission for University Education =

Agency of the Government of Kenya

Coordinates: 01°13′35″S 36°47′55″E

- CUE

Agency overview
- Formed: 2012; 14 years ago
- Jurisdiction: Government of Kenya
- Headquarters: Red Hill Road, Gigiri Nairobi, Kenya
- Agency executive: Chief executive officer, Prof.Mike Kuria
- Parent agency: Kenya Ministry of Education
- Website: Homepage

The Commission for Higher Education is an agency of the Government of Kenya, regulated by the Commission for University Act No. 42 of 2012 established by the Kenyan Parliament, that is mandated to plan, monitor, regulate, modify, improve and communicate policy to stakeholders, regarding university education in Kenya.

== Location ==
The headquarters of the Commission for University Education, are located at Red Hill Road, (off Limuru Road), in the Gigiri neighborhood of Nairobi, the capital city of Kenya. The geographical coordinates of the agency's headquarters are 1°13'35.0"S, 36°47'55.0"E (Latitude:-1.226389; Longitude:36.798611).

== History ==
CUE is governed by the Commission for University Act No. 42 of 2012, as amended.

== Overview ==
CUE's main role is to license new universities and other institutions of higher learning in Kenya. Accreditation may be provisional or permanent, and is revocable at the sole discretion of CUE. The agency is also responsible for monitoring the performance of the institutions that it licenses, to ensure that they maintain the standards, if satisfactory, and remedy those aspects, where improvement is needed. The commission is governed by a five-person Commission Board, chaired by the Commission Secretary, who also serves as the chief executive officer of the government agency.

== See also ==
- Education in Kenya
