= Kiriri Women's University of Science and Technology =

University in Nairobi, Kenya

- Type: Women's
- Established: May 2002
- Chancellor: Dr. Paul G. Ndarua
- Location: Nairobi, Kenya; 1.223737°S 36.966507°E
- Campus: Mwihoko Githurai (Main Campus) Kasarani, Westlands / Muguga Green
- Website: www.kwust.ac.ke

Kiriri Women's University of Science and Technology, often referred to as KWUST, is a non-state funded secular women's university in Nairobi, Kenya. It was started in 2002. Its aim is to empower women in sciences. Kiriri Women's University is the only women's university in east and southern Africa. Its main campus is located in Mwihoko, Githurai along Thika Road on the outskirt of Nairobi approximately 20km from Nairobi CBD. Kiriri has no male students. It offers Bachelors in Science degrees, mathematics (actuarial, pure, statistics), computer science and business administration, as well as diplomas and certificates.

== Admissions ==
Admissions are conducted twice annually, in May and September.The university maintains a female-only enrollment policy, in line with its mission to empower women in STEM and leadership fields.

== Accreditation ==
Kiriri Women's University of Science and Technology (KWUST) was officially accredited by the Commission for University Education (CUE) in Kenya and granted its charter on 2 August 2022.
