= Laikipia University =

Public university in Nyahururu, Kenya

- Former name: Laikipia University College
- Established: 2013
- Vice-Chancellor: Prof. Joseph K Rotich PhD
- Students: 8,000+
- Location: Nyahururu, Kenya
- Campus: Main campus
- Website: http://laikipia.ac.ke

Laikipia University is a Kenyan University located in Laikipia along the Nyahururu-Nakuru Highway approximately 11km from Nyahururu Town. It is a premier university of Education (Arts). It has 1 campus: Main Campus.

== History ==
Laikipia University was founded in 1929 as a primary school by William Thomas Alfred Levet. Between 1965 and 1970, the institution served as a Large–Scale Farmers Training College (LSFTC). LSFTC was administered by the Ministry of Agriculture and Animal Husbandry. In October 1979, it was converted into an Animal Husbandry and Industry Training Institute (AHITI) offering a two-year course leading to a Certificate in Animal Health. In 1990, Laikipia University was established as a Campus of Egerton University.

This followed the recommendations of a Government Committee appointed to look into modalities of absorbing a double intake of students from Secondary Schools. It was meant to offer Education courses for graduate teacher-training.

It remained a campus of Egerton University between 1990 till 2010 majoring in BEd Arts and BA corses. In 2011, it became a constituent University College of Egerton University until 19 February 2013 when the then President of the Republic of Kenya, his Excellency Hon. Mwai Kibaki awarded Charter to make the institution a fully-fledged University.

== Campuses ==
=== The Main Campus ===
Laikipia University Main Campus is located 50 km from Nakuru town and 11 km from Nyahururu Town, along the Nakuru - Nyahururu Highway. It is situated in a serene environment which is conducive for learning. The Main Campus is the University nerve centre where most courses are offered and has the majority of students. The Main Campus has numerous facilities ranging from classrooms, laboratories, library, computer hub, bookshop, sports & games facilities, hostels for student accommodation, a health centre, restaurant, farm and Lake Chacha, among others.

== Schools/Departments/Institutes ==
- School of Humanities and Developmental Studies
- School of Science and Applied Technology
- School of Business and Economics
- School of Education
- Graduate School

== School of Sciences and Applied Technology ==
The School of Science and Applied Technology has five Departments namely:

- Department of Biological & Biomedical Sciences Technology
- Department of Chemistry and Biochemistry
- Department of Mathematics
- Department of Computing and Informatics
- Department of Earth Sciences

== School of Humanities and Developmental Studies ==
The School of Humanities and Developmental Studies has two Departments namely:

- Literary and Communication Studies
- Public Affairs and Environmental Studies

== School of Business and Economics ==
The School of Business and Economics has two Departments namely:

- Department of Commerce
- Department of Economics

== School of Education ==
School of Education has two Departments namely:

- Psychology, Counselling and Educational Foundations
- Curriculum and Educational Management
