= ISCAE =

Business school based in Morocco and Guinea

Coordinates: 33°31′36.9″N 7°38′17.28″W

- Type: Public
- Established: 1971
- President: Ryad Mezzour
- Director: Tarik EL MALKI
- Location: Casablanca, Morocco
- Campus: Casablanca, Rabat, Guinea
- Website: GROUPEISCAE.ma

The ISCAE (Institut supérieur de commerce et d'administration des entreprises) is a business school in Casablanca and Rabat, Morocco and in Conakry, Guinea. It was founded in 1971 by King Hassan II to improve business education in Morocco.

== Programmes ==
=== Cycle Grande Ecole ===
The Cycle Grande Ecole is a three-year programme which delivers a master's degree in 3 different fields;

- Corporate finance
- Audit
- Marketing

=== Executive MBA ===
The ISCAE Executive MBA is a part-time programme which was substituted for the former Cycle Superieur de Gestion.

=== Chartered Professional Accountancy program ===
The ISCAE CPA Programm in collaboration with Association of Chartered Accountants (O.E.C Ordre des Experts Comptables)
