= Education in Kenya =

Education in Kenya refers to the education system of Kenya. The institutionalized system differs from traditional (or customary) education which had been in existence long before missionarisation and colonization, and was administered according to the various indigenous groups' cultures and customs.

Institutionalized education in Kenya dates back to as early as the 18th century among the Swahili people, whereby the earliest school was established by missionaries in Rabai. During colonial rule, schools for the colonial settlers and administrators, as well as schools serving various religious and cultural communities, were established.

Kenya has maneuvered through three education curriculums since independence in 1963, with the latest being the Competency-Based Curriculum (CBC), which was rolled out in 2017 to replace the 8-4-4 Curriculum that has been in practice since 1985.

Even though efforts have been put in place to promote basic education - with literacy levels increasing among the Kenyan population - poverty, teenage pregnancy, truancy, drug abuse, among others, all affect the literacy levels of prospective pupils.

In 2017, the World Economic Forum rated Kenya's education system as the strongest among forty-three other mainland Africa countries. In the following year, 2018, the World Bank also ranked Kenya as the top African country for education outcomes.

In Kenya, education is guaranteed by the Constitution of Kenya 2010, whose Article 53 stipulates that every child has the immediate right to free and compulsory basic education.

== History ==
East African socio-linguistic groups had access to institutionalized education by 1728, as attested by the Swahili manuscript Utendi wa Tambuka (Book of Heraclius). Some of these traditions were later documented in the travels of Johann Ludwig Krapf and Johannes Rebmann.

In the coastal region near Mombasa, missionaries from the Church Missionary Society (CMS) established the earliest mission school in Kenya at Rabai in 1846.

Over the late 19th and early 20th centuries, educational activity expanded inland alongside the railway from Mombasa to Uganda. Some communities adopted missionary schools, while others resisted them. In 1894, an attempt to establish a school and mission at Yatta encountered resistance from the Kamba community. In western Kenya, the first school was founded at Kaimosi in 1903.

During the early and mid-20th century, increasing numbers of Kenyans gained access to formal education and pursued further studies abroad. Among those who studied overseas during the colonial period were Jomo Kenyatta, Charles Njonjo, Peter Mbiyu Koinange, Mwai Kibaki, R. Mugo Gatheru, Tom Mboya, Masinde Muliro, Julius Gikonyo Kiano, and Barack Obama Sr.

Kenyatta attended Woodbrooke College and the London School of Economics, while Koinange studied at Columbia University and Muliro attended the University of Cape Town. Julius Gikonyo Kiano, who attended Stanford University, became the first Kenyan to obtain a PhD. Barack Obama Sr. later attended the University of Hawaiʻi at Mānoa.

Between 1959 and 1963, around 800 Kenyan students attended universities in the United States and Canada through the Airlift Programme, an initiative led by Tom Mboya that connected East African students with North American universities.

Educational participation increased steadily during the colonial period. By the time Kenya gained independence in 1963, approximately 840,000 African children were attending elementary school.

== Pre-independence schooling ==
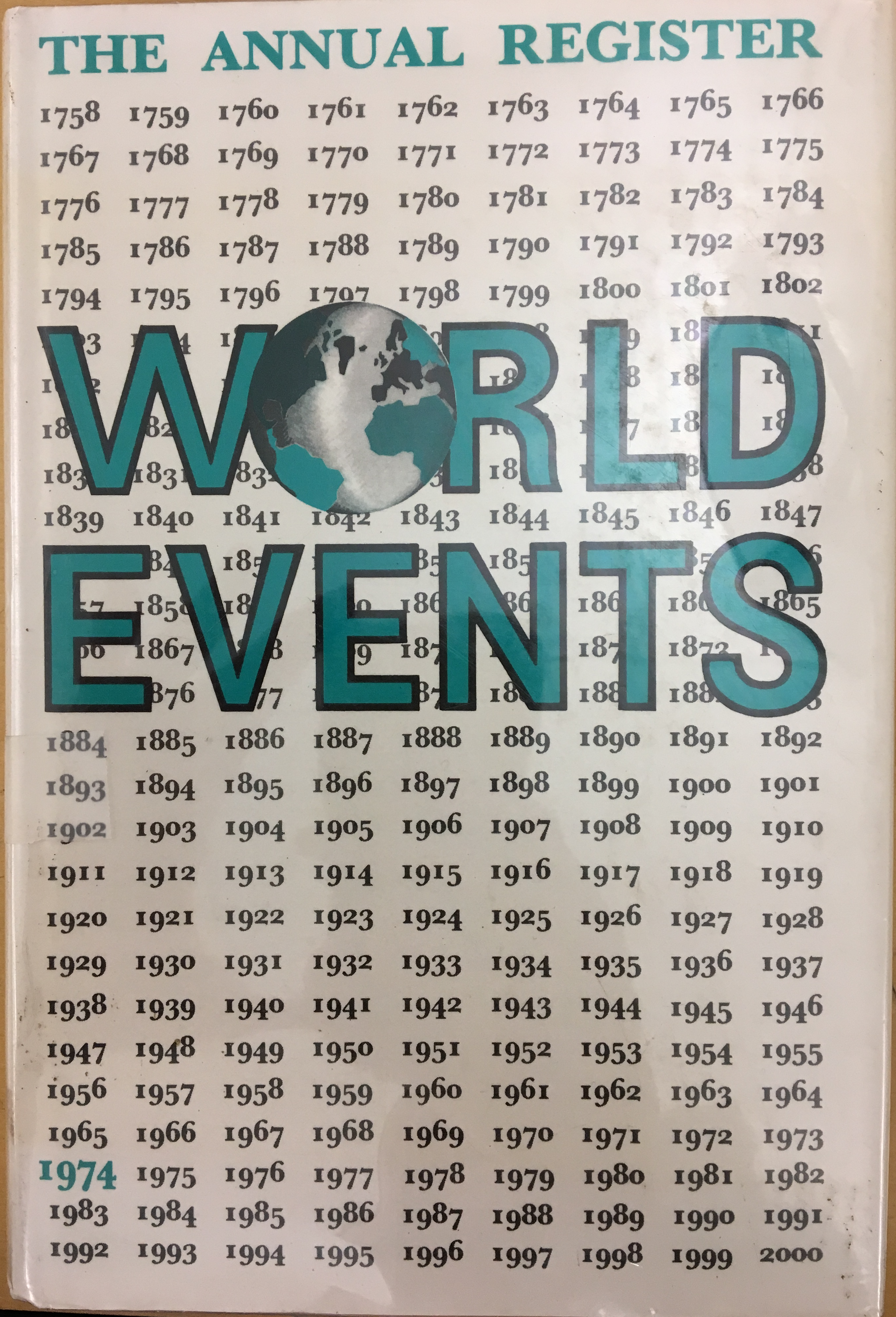
History form 1

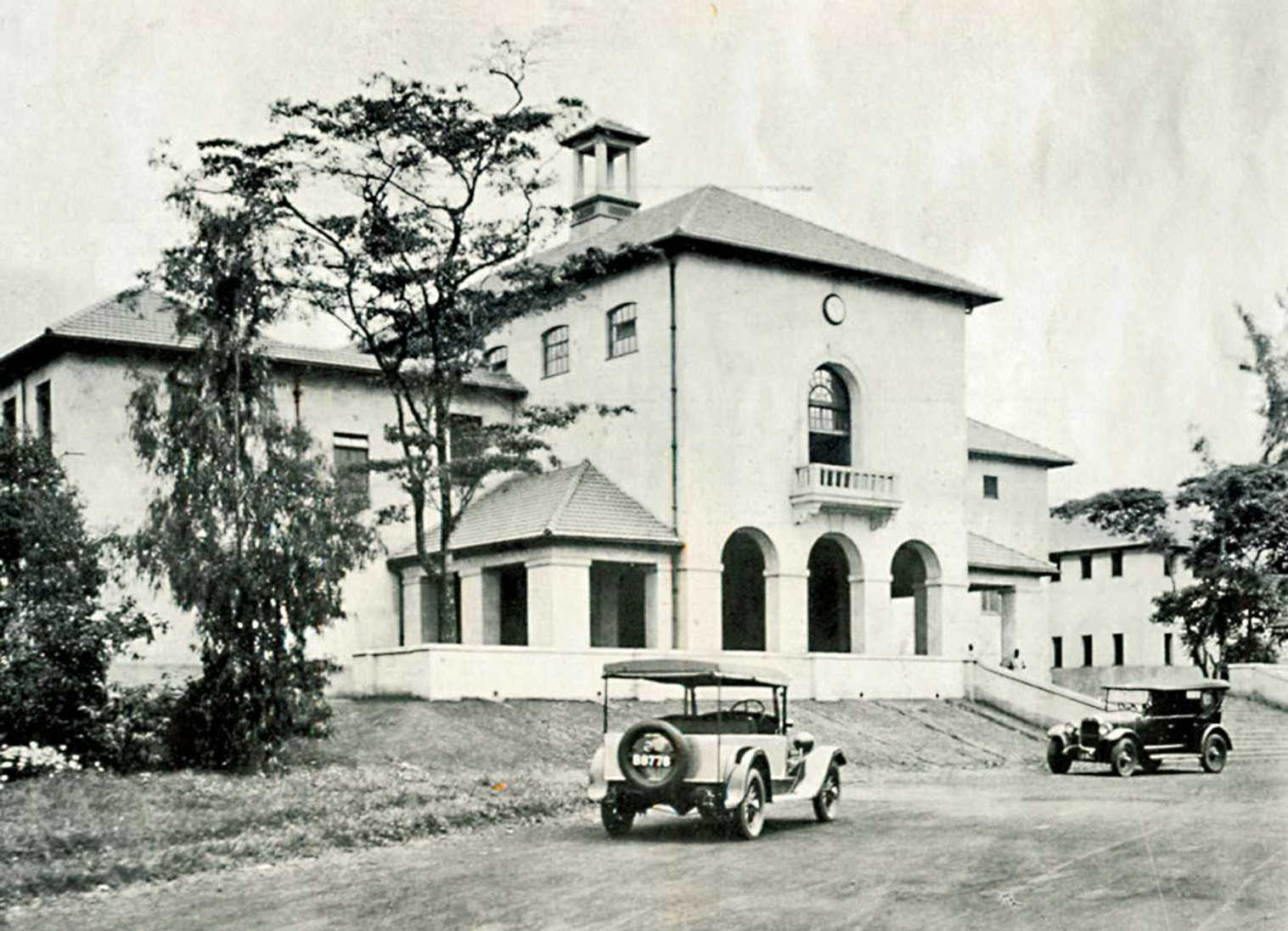
Nairobi Primary school

institutionalized education in Kenya had begun far before the country became independent in 1963, with at least seventy schools having been established by various groups and for various communities. These included:

- Pre-independence schools for ethnic Africans
- Pre-independence schools for Muslims and ethnic Arabs
- Pre-independence schools for ethnic Indians
- Pre-independence schools for ethnic Europeans
- Multi-ethnic schools

== Education curricula ==
=== 7–4–2–3 system ===
With the collapse of the East African community in 1977, Kenya continued with the same system of education but changed the examination names from their regional identity to a national identity. The East African Certificate of Primary Education (EACPE) became the Certificate of Primary Education (CPE) - awarded after 7 years of primary school - the first time the CPE was marked by a computer system. The East African Certificate of Education (EACE) became the Kenya Certificate of Education (KCE), awarded after 4 years of secondary school. The East African Advanced Certificate of Education (EAACE) became the Kenya Advanced Certificate of Education (KACE), awarded after 2 years of high school. The 7-4-2-3 system foresaw 11–13 years of basic education schooling and a minimum of 3 years for undergraduate university education.

=== 8–4–4 curriculum ===
In 1985, President Daniel arap Moi introduced the 8–4–4 system of education, which adopted 8 years of primary education, 4 years of secondary education and 4 years of university education. With the introduction of the 8–4–4 system CPE became KCPE (Kenya Certificate of Primary Education) while KCE became the Kenya Certificate of Secondary Education (KCSE). The length of basic education schooling was reduced to 12 years and the length of undergraduate studies was increased to a minimum of 4 years.

From 1985 to 2017, public education in Kenya was based on an 8–4–4 system, with eight years of primary education followed by four years of secondary school and four years of college or university. To date, there has been steady growth in the advancement of education in the country which boasts of a great number of public and private universities, as well as TVET institutions and middle-level colleges.

=== Competency Based Curriculum (CBC), 2-6-3-3-3 ===
In 2017, the Competency-Based Curriculum (CBC) was launched to replace the traditional 8–4–4 system introduced by the President Moi in 1985. The Competency-Based Curriculum was designed by the Kenya Institute of Curriculum Development (KICD) with the aim of churning out 'engaged, empowered and ethical citizens'.

Unlike the 8-4-4 system, where learners would spend 8 years in primary education, 4 years in secondary school, and 4 years at the university, the CBC curriculum runs on a 2-6-3-3-3 system of education, where basic education has been organized in three levels; Early Years Education, Middle School Education, and Senior School Education.

Under CBC, learners spend 2 years in Pre-primary, 6 years in Primary School (Grades 1–6), 3 years in Junior School (Grades 7, 8, 9), 3 years in Senior School (Grades 10,11,12) - retaining 12 years of basic education schooling - and 3 years in university.

The Competency-Based Curriculum puts emphasis on seven core competences namely: communication and collaboration, critical thinking and problem-solving, creativity and imagination, citizenship, digital literacy, learning to learn and self-efficacy.

According to KICD, the traditional curriculum is teacher-centered while the CBC is learner-centered.

Learners are assessed on the seven competencies based on the following areas: Meeting Expectations (ME), Approaching Expectations (AE) and Below Expectations (BE).

The first cohort of learners under the CBC curriculum completed their Primary Education in 2022, and transitioned to Junior School in 2023. The government has through the Ministry of Education been investing in developing the infrastructure required in public schools across the country to accommodate the Junior School pupils.

In October 2021, President Uhuru Kenyatta directed the National Treasury to increase funding to education. 8B to the Education Ministry for the construction of 10,000 classrooms in secondary schools across the country by 2023. According to the then-Education Cabinet Secretary Prof George Magoha, 700 new CBC junior classrooms had been completed within secondary schools as of February 2021. Consequently, CBC has been a top priority funding area in the KSh 126.3B supplementary budget, submitted to parliament by Treasury Cabinet Secretary Ukur Yattani.

According to the Kenya Institute of curriculum Development (KICD), students transitioning to Junior Schools will be between the ages of 12 and 14.

=== British curriculum ===
An increasing number of private schools offer a system of education similar to the British system of education with eight to nine years of preparatory/primary school, followed by two to three years of secondary school (culminating in the International General Certificate of Secondary Education (IGCSE), and thereafter two years of high school leading to the Advanced Level qualification. This has similarities with the 7-4-2-3 system described above.

=== North American curriculum ===
A few private schools provide formal education based on the K–12 education system in the United States and the Canadian curriculum, consisting of twelve school grades, leading to the equivalent of the US-American and Canadian high school diplomas. Such schools include Rosslyn Academy, West Nairobi School and International School of Kenya in Nairobi, as well as Rift Valley Academy in Kijabe.

== Transition rates and overall performance ==
Out of all children in Kenya, about 85% attend primary school. Seventy-five percent of those who complete primary education will proceed to secondary schools and 60% of those who complete secondary school will proceed to institutions of a higher level of education, including business and vocational institutions, national polytechnics, public and private universities within the country. Over 950,000 Kenyans have furthered their education abroad with a majority of graduates from India, the United Kingdom, Canada, the United States, Russia, and Uganda.

== Education quality ==
Education quality has recently received a lot of attention in Kenya. The Kenyan government's primary document influencing this effort, the Kenya Education Sector Support Program for 2005–2010, established the National Assessment Centre (NAC) to monitor learning achievement. In 2010, the NAC released the results of its first assessment.

In 2009, in collaboration with the NAC, conducted an assessment of the basic literacy and numeracy skills of children ages 6–16. The Annual Learning Assessment (ALA) reached villages in 70 out of 158 districts in Kenya and assessed nearly 70,000 children in their homes. The ALA was set at a Standard 2 level, which is the level where students are supposed to achieve basic competency in reading English and Kiswahili and complete simple arithmetic problems. The chart below shows the percent of children who could not read a Standard 2 level paragraph or solve Standard 2 level subtraction problems:

Level of Children Assessed	Cannot Read English Paragraph	Cannot Read Swahili Paragraph	Cannot Do Subtraction
Standard 2	85%	–	79%
Standard 5	27%	23%	30%
Standard 8	4%	4%	10%

Key findings about education in Kenya, based on the results of the Uwezo 2009 assessment:

1. Literacy levels are low, and are substantially lower in certain regions. Girls tend to perform better in reading English and Kiswahili, while boys tend to perform better in math.
2. Literacy levels are lower in public schools than private schools.
3. Most children can solve real world, "ethno-mathematics" problems, while fewer can solve similar math problems in an abstract, pencil and paper format.
4. 5% of children are not enrolled in school, but the problem is far worse in particular regions.
5. About half of children are enrolled in pre-school.
6. Many children are older than expected for their class level, including 40% of children in class 2, and 60% of children in class 7.
7. North Eastern Province and arid districts in Rift Valley and Eastern Provinces have particularly low performance; and many older children, especially girls, are not attending school.
8. Many families pay for extra tuition, which focuses heavily on drilling and exam preparation.
9. Schools struggle to plan their budgets because they receive funds at unpredictable times.
10. Children whose mothers are educated, particularly beyond primary school, tend to have much higher rates of literacy and numeracy.
11. About 15% of students are absent on a given day, with much higher absenteeism in certain districts as a result of increased poverty level.
12. There is a severe shortage of teachers, estimated at 4 teachers per school.
13. The reluctance of the government to invest in educational institutions in marginalized areas thereby developing schools in cities only which result in inefficient education process in arid and semi-arid areas.
14. Embezzlement of public funds by school administrators and lack of accountability of the use of government grants and high levels of corruption in educational institutions.

Due to the mentioned problems in public education, private schools are soaring in popularity, even among families that can ill afford school fees.

== Early Childhood Development education ==
Early Childhood Development (ECD) or pre-primary education serves as the foundation of Kenya’s basic education system and targets children aged 0–5 years. The programme emphasizes early literacy, numeracy, social development, play-based learning, and values such as responsibility, creativity, and respect for diversity. ECD is delivered through three levels: Baby Class, Nursery, and Pre-Unit. Since the rollout of the Competency-Based Curriculum (CBC) in 2017, pre-primary learning has focused on age-appropriate competencies, learner participation, and holistic development.

Between 1992 and 2002, the number of ECD centres increased by almost 69%, reflecting growing demand for early learning services across the country. This expansion continued after devolution in 2013, when responsibility for ECD infrastructure and staffing was transferred to county governments, while the national government retained curriculum development and teacher training. By 2023, more than 2.3 million children were enrolled in ECD institutions nationwide.

=== Accessibility concerns in ECD education ===
Access to ECD services in Kenya is shaped by multiple factors, including household income, regional disparities, mobility patterns, and varying levels of infrastructure across counties. Families living in poverty often struggle to meet indirect schooling costs such as uniforms, meals, and transport, which can reduce enrolment and retention in the early years. Although ECDE is publicly funded in many counties, parental contributions remain common, especially in private centres and community-run institutions.

Regional variations also influence access. Arid and Semi-Arid Lands (ASAL) counties experience challenges linked to long distances between learning centres, nomadic lifestyles, and occasional insecurity that disrupts continuity in early learning. To address this, several counties have adopted mobile ECDE centres and community-based models to reach children in migratory communities.

Gender disparities in ECD enrolment have declined significantly over the last decade, with national data showing near gender parity. However, localized cultural practices in some regions still contribute to uneven enrolment, with boys sometimes prioritized in households facing economic hardship.

Policy challenges persist in areas such as standardized teacher training, harmonization of learning environments, and early identification of children with special needs. While many counties have expanded ECDE classrooms and hired trained caregivers, some community-based centres still operate with limited facilities and minimal trained personnel.

Health factors, particularly those affecting children under five, also influence ECD outcomes. Kenya has made substantial progress in reducing infant and under-five mortality over the past decade, but children facing chronic illness, malnutrition, or inadequate healthcare remain at heightened risk of delayed school entry or irregular attendance.

== Primary education ==
Primary education marks the beginning of the 8-4-4 Curriculum. It begins at the age of 5 to 7 after completion of a year of kindergarten commonly known as nursery school or pre-unit. The first class or year of primary school is known as Standard 1, the final year as Standard 8 and primary school children are known as pupils. The school year at both primary and secondary levels, begins in January and ends in November. Students get 3 school vacations in April, August and December.

At the end of the school year, students advance to the next grade. Since repetition was banned students still progress to the next grade even though they fail their examinations. Most primary schools are day schools with pupils living at home. Fewer schools at primary level are boarding schools compared to secondary schools. All public primary school pupils sit for the Kenya Certificate of Primary Education examination at the end of the school year in Standard eight. In primary school, students are taught English, Kiswahili and Indigenous language activities.

- Lower primary: This is a 4-year period that marks the first transition into the mainstream primary education system. and starts at ages 6 or 7. The grading system is called "standard", meaning the first four years the students transition from standard one through four.
- Upper primary: This is also a 4-year period that helps prepare the students for the high school years. At standard 7, the students become more aware of which high schools they want to attend. During the last year of the primary school system, students are allowed to select 4 to 6 secondary schools that they would like to attend including one national school and take the KCPE, which validates their transition to high school.

Universal Primary Education (UME), an international development goal created by the World Conference on Education, has led to Kenya's target of universal primary education for all citizens. Since 2003, enrollments have increased drastically and today Kenya has much closer rates of enrollment to first world countries, such as the United States. In January 2003 President Mwai Kibaki re-introduced free primary education which previously existed before the mid-80s when the government adopted cost-sharing measures that led to a minor level of school fees charged by primary schools for textbooks, PTA, and extracurricular activities. Since 2003, education in public schools became free and compulsory (Kenya Constitution, Article 53, 2010). On learning that primary education had once again become free in Kenya, Kimani Maruge, an uneducated farmer and the world's oldest person to enrol in primary school joined Kapkenduiywo primary school in Eldoret at the age of 84. He was elected head boy at the age of 86 in 2005.

== Secondary education ==
Secondary schools in Kenya fall into three categories: government-funded, Harambee and private. Government-funded schools are divided into national, provincial and district levels. Harambee schools do not receive full funding from the government and private schools are run by private organizations or individuals. After taking the primary school leaving exam and successfully passing, government-funded schools select students in order of scores.

Students with the highest scores gain admission into national schools, while those with average scores are selected into provincial and district schools. Harambee schools accept students with low scores. Students who fail their examinations pursue technical and vocational education. The latter is divided into technical secondary school (lasting 4 years) and apprenticeships solutions. Since 2010, technical secondary schools student can have access to university programs. A number of students also drop out of school by choice due to poor scores.

Under the current system, students attend secondary school for four years before sitting for the school-leaving exam at the end of the fourth year. The first-class or year of secondary school is known as form 1 and the final year is form 4. At the end of the fourth year, from October to November, students sit for the Kenya Certificate of Secondary Education examination. In 2008, the government introduced plans to offer free secondary education to all Kenyans.

Historic national high schools include Mang'u High School, Alliance High School (Kenya), Lenana School and Starehe Boys' Centre and School. Private secondary schools in Kenya are generally costly, offering students an alternative system of education with better or more luxurious facilities compared to public schools. Most private schools in Kenya offer the British system of education which includes "O-levels" and "A-levels". Very few offer the American system of education, and a good number of them offer the Kenya system. Some of the oldest private schools in Kenya include Loreto Convent Msongari, Nairobi (1921), St. Mary's School, Nairobi, Braeburn School, Consolata School, Strathmore School, Oshwal Academy, Rift Valley Academy, Aga Khan Academy, Kenton College and Brookhouse School.

=== KCSE grading requirements ===
==== Subject grouping ====
The average grade is based on performance in seven subjects. Where a candidate sits for more than the minimum seven subjects, the average grade is based on the best seven subjects. The grade assigned to the candidate depends on how well he has performed in all the seven ranked subjects. The subjects are grouped. The exams from Group 1 are compulsory. Students must pick at least two Group 2 exams, and one Group 3 exam. Sitting Group 4 and 5 exams is optional.

Group
	Group 1	Group 2	Group 3	Group 4	Group 5
Subject
Subject	English; Kiswahili; Mathematics or Mathematics, Alternative B	Biology; Physics; Chemistry; Biology for the Blind; General Science	History; Geography; Christian Religious Education (CRE) or Islamic Religious Education (IRE) or Hindu Religious Education (HRE)	Home Science; Art and Design; Agriculture; Wood Work; Metal Work ; Building Construction; Power Mechanics; Electricity; Drawing and Design; Aviation Technology; Computer Studies	French; German; Arabic; Sign Language; Music; Business Studies
	Compulsory	Minimum of two or maximum of three	Minimum of one or maximum of two	Optional or maximum of one	Optional or maximum of one

==== Grading system ====
Mean grading

Grade	A	A− (minus)	B+ (plus)	B (plain)	B− (minus)	C+ (plus)	C (plain)	C− (minus)	D+ (plus)	D (plain)	D− (minus)	E
Points	84–81	80–74	73–67	66–60	59–53	52–46	45–39	38–32	31–25	24–18	17–11	10–7

Subject grading

Grade	A	A− (minus)	B+ (plus)	B (plain)	B− (minus)	C+ (plus)	C (plain)	C− (minus)	D+ (plus)	D (plain)	D− (minus)	E
Points	12	11	10	9	8	7	6	5	4	3	2	1

- Grade P – This grade denotes that the results are pending due to infringement of entry requirements. For instance, the candidate did not key in the correct index number or was involved in some form of forgery.
- Grade X – This grade is awarded to a candidate who did not sit for one or all the papers that they registered for. In that case, the student will not be graded and will be awarded Grade X. This grade will automatically be awarded when total points scored by candidate fall below 7. A candidate will also be awarded Grade X if they did not sit minimum required subjects in grades 1, 2 and 3. However, the candidate can be graded (Grade A – E) after skipping for the final exams in any subjects in Grades 4 and 5, provided they sat for at least seven subjects in grades 1, 2 and 3, but their certificate and transcript will indicate Grade X in that particular subject.
- Grade W – A candidate is awarded this grade on suspicion of exam malpractice. The examination board will conduct further investigation before grading or cancelling the results of the candidate.
- Grade Y - After exam irregularities are proven, the candidate will be awarded Grade Y. The candidate may face prosecution and will have to resit the examination with the next cohort.

University matriculation is based on the best eight and performance in particular subjects relevant to degree courses. For instance:

Subject	Group	Grade	Points
English	1	B+	10
Kiswahili	1	A−	11
Mathematics	1	A	12
History & Government	3	B	9
Geography	3	A−	11
Physics	2	B+	10
Chemistry	2	B−	8
Biology	2	A−	11

The total number of points is 74: which is a mean grade of A−. Chemistry has not been used in the ranking, as maximum number of subjects that can be used in final ranking are seven. This student qualifies for direct admission in a Public University. Training institutions and faculties and departments determine their own minimum entry requirements.

The number of students admitted to public universities through the Kenya Universities and Colleges Central Placement Service (KUCCPS), prior to 2012 known as Kenya Universities Joint Admissions Board (JAB), depends on the total number of places available in all the public universities. Nonetheless, those who miss out but attained the minimum university entry mark of C+ or C with a relevant diploma certificate are admitted through the parallel degree programs (module II) if they can afford the full fees for the course.

Students who manage a grade of C+ qualify to do a degree course at the university. Owing to the competition, and fewer places at the university, those with B (and, in a few cases, B−) and above are taken for degree courses at the public universities and benefit by paying government-subsidized fees. The rest join private universities or middle-level colleges.

People have questioned the rationale and morality of locking out qualified students from public institutions yet still admitting those who come from financially able families.

== Technical and vocational education and training institutions ==
These institutions operate under the state department of vocational and technical training under the helm of a Principal Secretary. The current Secretary is Esther Thaara Muhoria.

They award artisan, craft and diploma and higher national diploma certificates after successful completion of relevant courses. Courses offered by these institutions include Business Education, Accounting, Secretarial Studies, Nursing, Teacher Training, Computer Studies, Journalism, Media, Design, Culinary Studies, Foreign Languages, Tourism and Engineering. In order of credibility or accreditation, national polytechnics rank first, followed by government training institutes, teacher training colleges and private institutions. Although generally termed colleges, these institutions do not award degrees.

From July 2014, all government and private institutions offering Technical and Vocational Education and Training where put under the TVET act. This act normalized this sector as it had become tainted by unaccredited institutions offering substandard education as revealed by The Standard and The Star. As of 10 October 2016, there were 540 institutions accredited by the Authority.

=== Government TVET institutions ===
There are three types of government TVET institutions in Kenya. These are National Polytechnics, Technical Institutions and Vocational Education Centers (formerly Youth Polytechnics).

Notable institutions include:

1. Technical University of Kenya
2. Technical University of Mombasa
3. The Sigalagala National Polytechnic
4. Rift Valley Technical Training Institute

== University education ==
There are 48 universities in Kenya, 22 of which are public and 26 private. The University of Nairobi is the oldest public university in Kenya while KAG East university is the oldest among the private universities.

While education accessibility has been of major importance at the primary and secondary levels in Kenya, the attempt of making education accessible has not been implemented at the higher education level, which leaves students from a lower socioeconomic status at a disadvantage compared to those of a higher socioeconomic status. In recent years there has been an increase in the cost of higher education worldwide, and there is no exception for Kenya which is limiting access to specific socioeconomic groups and those from different regions and ethnic groups since it favors and is more accessible to those who can afford it. There are very few students from disadvantaged backgrounds attending higher education institutions which is a reflection of the society and the quality of prior education. There are many social inequalities present in Kenya which have a direct impact on education such as: disparities in distribution of national income, security, and employment, levels of investment, health care, and public services are also evident across populations, genders, and ethnic groups. In an observation done by the Society for International Development, in 2004 10% of Kenya's population controlled about 42% of the national income while 10% contents with significantly less than 1%. The poverty gap has widened so significantly that the top 1% is making approximately $1,204 per month while the rest of the population is making approximately $181 per month.

Immediately after independence, Kenya's public higher education was free for all students regardless of their socioeconomic status; it was fully funded by the government. This created a high demand for higher education which raised a concern for donor agencies. At that time, the demand was continuously increasing, but Kenya's economy was not improving, so the government established a cost sharing and cost recovery model. In the cost sharing model, the government would cover part of the cost, but the remaining cost was the institutions and families responsibility. After this change, the student loan scheme was introduced. It was the responsibility of the Higher Education Loans Board (HELB) to pay out loans to Kenyan students that are interested in attending a higher education institution; there have been concerns that the loans are not being distributed equitably which has not fully improved the higher education access issues. Kenya has also explored the Module II admissions plan. In this plan, the admitted students must pay their full tuition fees but also pay an amount that is equivalent to attending a private institution. This has widened the accessibility gap for families of lower socioeconomic status as they will not be able to pay the amount of tuition, so higher education remains unaffordable and inaccessible for those students.

Due to the current policies and financial requirements, educational access is limited to students who perform highly in academics and those who do not. If students are academically inclined and perform well in their primary and secondary education institutions, the educational fees and increasing tuition costs cause them to be unable to attend a higher education institution. Cost sharing has created an even larger gap in accessibility for students; continuing similar policies will keep creating a larger gap.

=== Higher education financing ===
In 2023, the Government of Kenya launched the Higher Education Financing portal to ensure equality in the access to education for university and TVET students. The HEF portal is based on the New Funding Model (NFM) launched by the President of Kenya on 3 May 2023. Under the NFM, students assessed as vulnerable and extremely needy will receive 100% Government funding for their education. Those assessed as needy will receive 93% of Government funding via the HEF portal.

=== Digital accessibility in university education ===
There has been a recent focus on digital accessibility after the COVID-19 pandemic. In a study done by Githinji et al. (2022), there was a focus on the accessibility of digital content in Kenya. This was done at the higher education level. The study found that one of the major challenges in accessibility was the internet connectivity for both educators and students. In many areas in the country, there are not the necessary resources or funds to be able to purchase a device to access digital content.

==== Public universities ====
Sno	University Name	Area	Year Chartered	Original name	Year established	Campus
1	University of Nairobi	Nairobi	1970	Royal Technical College, Royal College Nairobi	1956	Main campus, Kikuyu campus, Chiromo campus, Lower Kabete campus, Upper Kabete campus, Parklands campus, Kenya Science campus, Mombasa campus and Kisumu campus
2	Moi University	Eldoret	1984	Moi University	1984	
3	Kenyatta University	Nairobi	1985	Kenyatta University College	1965	Main campus, Parklands campus, Ruiru campus, City campus, Kitui campus, Mombasa campus, Nakuru campus
4	Egerton University	Njoro	1988			
5	Maseno University	Maseno	1991	Maseno Govt. Training Institute, Siriba Teachers College	1955	Oginga Odinga University
6	Jomo Kenyatta University of Agriculture and Technology	Kiambu	1994	Jomo Kenyatta College of Agriculture	1981	Multimedia University College of Kenya, Meru University College of Science and Technology, Murang'a University College
7	Masinde Muliro University of Science and Technology	Kakamega	2007	Western College of Arts and Applied Sciences	1972	Constituent colleges, Kibabii University College, Turkana University Uollege, Kaimosi University College, Main campus in Kakamega and Mumias campus
8	Dedan Kimathi University of Technology	Nyeri	2012	Kimathi Institute of Technology, Kimathi University College of Technology (2007) as a Constituent College of Jomo Kenyatta University of Agriculture and Technology	1972	Main Campus, Nyeri
9	Chuka University	Chuka	2012	Egerton University Eastern Campus College, Chuka University College (2007) as a Constituent College of Egerton University	2004	Main Campus, Chuka
10	Technical University of Kenya	Nairobi	2013	Kenya Technical Institute, Kenya Polytechnic, Kenya Polytechnic University College (2007) as a Constituent College of the University of Nairobi	1961	Main Campus, Nairobi
11	Technical University of Mombasa	Mombasa	2013	(MIOME), Mombasa Technical Institute [1966], Mombasa Polytechnic [1976], The Mombasa Polytechnic University College [2007] as a Constituent College of Jomo Kenyatta University of Agriculture and Technology	1940	Main Campus, Tudor. Satellite Campuses in Kwale and Lamu County
12	Pwani University	Kilifi	2013	Kilifi Institute of Agriculture, Pwani University College as a Constituent College of Kenyatta University	2007	Main Campus, Kilifi
13	Kisii University	Kisii	2013	Primary Teachers' Training College (1965), Secondary Teachers' College (1983), Egerton Campus (1994), Kisii University College (2007) as a Constituent College of Egerton University	1965	Main Campus, Kisii Town Campus
14	University of Eldoret	Eldoret	2013	Chepkoilel University College as a Constituent College of Moi University		Main Campus Eldoret
15	Maasai Mara University	Narok	2013	Narok University College as a Constituent College of Moi University	2008	Main Campus, Narok
16	Jaramogi Oginga Odinga University of Science and Technology	Kisumu	2013	Bondo Teachers Training College, Bondo University College, as a Constituent College of Maseno University	(2009)	Main Campus, Lake Victoria
17	Laikipia University	Laikipia	2013	LSFTC (1965), AHITI (1979), Egerton University Campus (1990), Laikipia University College, as a Constituent College of Egerton University		Main Campus, Nyahururu town Campus, Naivasha Campus, Nakuru Campus, Maralal Campus
18	South Eastern Kenya University	Kitui	2013	Ukamba Agricultural Institute (Ukai), South Eastern University College (Seuco)	2008	SEKU Main Campus, Kitui Town Campus, Mtito-Andei Campus, Migwani Center
19	Multimedia University of Kenya	Nairobi	2013	Central Training School (CTS) to serve East African Posts Training School (1948), (KCCT) Kenya College of Communications Technology (1992), Multimedia University college of Kenya	2008	(MMU) Main Campus
20	University of Kabianga	Kericho	2013	The Government School, Kabianga (1925), Kabianga Teachers' Training College (1929), Kabianga Framers Training Cente (1959), Kabianga Campus of Moi University (2007), Kabianga University College	2009	(UoK) Main Campus, Kapkatet Campus, Kericho Satellite Campus, Satellite Campus
21	Karatina University	Karatina	2013	Moi University Central Kenya Campus, Karatina University College	2008	Main Campus, Karatina Town Campus, Itiati Campus, Nanyuki Campus, Riverbank Campus
22	Meru University of Science and Technology	Meru	2013	(MECOTECH) Meru College of Technology (1979), (MUCST) Meru University College of Science and Technology	2008	MUST Main Campus, Meru Town Campus
23	Kirinyaga University	Kerugoya	2016	Kirinyaga Technical Institute, Kirinyaga University College	2012	Kutus, Kerugoya
24	Machakos University.	Machakos	2016	Technical Rural Training School (1957), Machakos Technical and Trade School(1958), Machakos Technical School(1967), Machakos Technical Training Institute (MTTI) (1987)	1957	Main Campus, Machakos
25	The Co-operative university of Kenya	Nairobi	1968	Jomo Kenyatta University of Agriculture and Technology	2016	CUK Main campus, Karen
26	University of Embu	Embu	2016	Embu Agricultural Staff Training College	1947	Main Campus, Embu
27	Alupe University	Busia	2022	Alupe University College	2015	Main campus, Busia
28	Tharaka University	Tharaka Nithi	2022	Tharaka University College	2015	Main campus, Tharaka Nithi
29	Mama Ngina University College	Gatundu South	2021			Main Campus, Gatundu South

=== Private universities ===
There are 3 categories of private universities: chartered universities – fully accredited universities, by the Commission for Higher Education; universities, which had been offering degrees long before the establishment of the Commission for Higher Education; and universities authorized to operate with Letters of Interim Authority (LIA).

==== Chartered universities ====
1. Strathmore University.
2. Mount Kenya University.
3. University of Eastern Africa, Baraton.
4. United States International University Africa (USIU-A).
5. Catholic University of Eastern Africa (CUEA).
6. Daystar University.
7. Kabarak University.
8. Riara University.
9. KAG East University
10. Kenya Methodist University (KeMU).
11. Africa Nazarene University.
12. St. Paul's University.
13. Kenya Methodist University.
14. Pan Africa Christian University.
15. Scott Christian University.
16. Maasai Mara University.
17. Kenya Highlands Evangelical University. Formerly Kenya Highlands Bible College (KHBC).
18. Great Lakes University of Kisumu.
19. Africa International University (formerly NEGST).
20. KCA University.
21. Adventist University of Africa (Rongai).
22. Pan Africa Christian University.
23. University of Eastern Africa, Baraton.
24. Aga Khan University.

==== Universities with Letters of Interim Authority (LIA) ====
1. Kiriri Women's University of Science and Technology.
2. Presbyterian University of East Africa.
3. Gretsa University.
4. The East African University.
5. UMMA University.
6. Management University of Africa.
7. Riara University.
8. Pioneer International University.
9. RAF International University.
10. Adventist University.
11. Inoorero University.
12. GENCO University.

==== Universities operating with Certificates of Registration ====
1. The Nairobi International School of theology.

== Teacher education ==
Most universities in Kenya have a teacher training programme, and the B.Ed. programmes often have the most students compared to other programmes. Kenya's population is growing, which in turn means that the demand for teachers is growing; however, there is often a shortage of teachers due to budget issues in schools. There are four different levels of teacher education. Early childhood development teacher education, which is available as a certificate or 2-year diploma, requires 300 hours of teaching practice. Primary teacher education is a 2-year programme in which teachers-in-training practice teaching in four sessions of three weeks. A variety of subjects are studied. Diploma teacher education is a 3-year programme. Teacher trainees in this programme take a wide variety of subjects. The undergraduate bachelor’s programme is a 4-year programme; trainees study 2 different subjects. All teaching programmes require teaching practice in which a teacher trainee prepares for lessons and teaches the lesson while being assessed on their preparation and the teaching itself. Mentor teachers at the school work with administration and supervisors to assess the teacher trainee. One challenge to teacher education in Kenya is a lack of experienced teacher educators who have knowledge of both the content and pedagogy. Additionally, some of the teacher educators of primary programmes were themselves trained at the secondary level, so they do not possess the knowledge of primary education necessary.

== Access to education ==
In 2003, the government launched the Free Primary Education programme (FPE), which abolished primary school fees for all children. Previously, school fees, uniform costs, and textbook costs were a substantial barrier to education for many, especially considering the rate of poverty and economic inequality in Kenya. The aim of FPE was to remove these barriers to education and ensure that more children with low socioeconomic status are able to access schooling. Despite the goals of FPE to improve equitable education for all, analysis of the Kenya Certificate of Primary Education (KCPE) examination scores showed that counties with high enrollment impact and improved KCPE scores were in the arid and semi-arid area, while counties with high enrollment impact and lower KCPE scores were in coastal areas.

FPE led to an increased number of students who could attend school. It also led to an increase in the number of private schools, and it resulted in a larger teacher-student ratio in schools. Despite more students per teacher, researchers found that the implementation of FPE resulted in only slightly decreased test scores in those who would have finished primary school regardless of FPE. Overall, FPE succeeded in increasing access to primary school.

=== Students with disabilities ===
The Free Primary Education programme secured equal rights for children with disabilities and set aside funding for schools with students with disabilities. Still, by 2005 less than 10% of children with disabilities had access to schooling. In 2010, a new constitution was adopted by Kenya which ensured that children with disabilities have the right to a free and compulsory education. Also in 2010, the National Special Needs Education Policy Framework was adopted by the Kenyan government to ensure that students with disabilities have access to good education. The objectives of this framework include early identification and intervention, increasing public awareness, supporting research, and providing adequate facilities. Despite the strong intentions of this framework to make education accessible for children with disabilities, by 2018 the framework had not been fully implemented. It is not uncommon for policies to remain unimplemented after adoption in Kenya; this may be due to a lack of available government funds.

Prior to the adoption of Free Primary Education, only four categories of disability were recognized: hearing impaired, mentally handicapped, physically handicapped, and visually impaired. After Free Primary education was adopted, autism, cerebral palsy, and Down syndrome were included in the disability categories. The National Special Needs Education Policy Framework further expanded the list of recognized disability categories to twenty-two, including orphaned students, the internally displaced, and nomadic students. There have been strides made in helping students with disabilities access an equitable education, but challenges remain. Few teachers are trained in special education. Referral and assessment services do not receive adequate funding, and not all schools have access to these resources. Additionally, there is a cultural stigma on people with disabilities in Kenya. The stigma and marginalization on people with disabilities is particularly acute in rural areas.

Mobile devices are seeing some success as assistive technology for the visually impaired in Kenya. Approximately 1.4% of Kenyans may be visually impaired, and students who are visually impaired have less access to textual works. There are six schools for the blind in Kenya, but only two of them offer secondary education. Only two universities admit visually impaired students, and the majors open to them are limited because of a lack of assistive technology resources. However, mobile devices are very common in Kenya, and one study found that distributing mobile devices to students made it easier for students with visual impairments to access education. Students were able to type notes, record lectures, have text read to them, and easily communicate with classmates and professors via email.

=== Women's access to education ===
In 2008, the national secondary education expansion program was put in place. This program reduced school fees at the secondary level and increased class sizes, thereby expanding access. This policy resulted in an increase of educational attainment by women by 0.75 years. It also reduced the chance of a first childbirth by age 19 and age 20 by about 30%, and it reduced the chance of first marriage by age 16 and age 18 by 40% and 20% respectively. Higher education for women is associated with benefits for both women and their future children.

== Factors affecting education in Kenya ==
In 2003, the Kenyan government promised free primary education to its citizens. In the early 70s, primary school fees were abolished, but in the mid 80s, cost-sharing measures between the government and its citizens led to the re-introduction of minor fee charges by primary schools. As the trend continued with schools requiring parents to pay fees such as PTA, harambee, textbooks, uniforms, caution fees, exam fees and extracurricular activity fees, parents became unable to raise such fees. Those who could not afford the money to pay for their children's school fees often had their children drop out of school. Many children were also forced to drop out of school when teachers would not allow them to take exams. To pressurize parents to pay fees, schools often sent children home during the final exams.

The growth of Kenya's education sector has exceeded expectations. After the first university was established in 1970, six other public universities and 23 private universities have been established. Although Kenya has its own universities, some parents prefer to send their children to universities outside the country. This is largely because Kenyan public universities are not as flexible with admission requirements as some foreign universities. Youth with disabilities are facing major obstacles to progress in higher education, and measures as affirmative action or measures tailored to the needs of particular profiles of students could play a relevant role in this.

== Literacy ==
In a 2020 study on literacy published in Early Education and Development, researchers found that mothers and fathers in Kenya do not spend much time reading and storytelling with their children. This may be explained by the low level of education attained by the mostly rural participants in the study; it could also be explained by the amount of time these families need to spend on subsistence activities. However, one-third of other household members did read to children living in the same household, which had a positive effect on early childhood literacy.

== See also ==
- Aiducation
- Kenya National Examination Council
- List of universities and colleges in Kenya.
- List of schools in Kenya
- Gender disparities in Kenyan education
- National Library Service of Kenya
- TVET schools in Kenya
