= Kikuyu Constituency =

Electoral division in Kenya

Kikuyu
- constituency for the Parliament of Kenya
- Kikuyu Constituency within Kiambu County

- Kiambu County within Kenya
- County: Kiambu
- Population: 187,122
- Area: 173 km^{2} (66.8 sq mi)

Current constituency
- Number of members: 1
- Party: UDA
- Member of Parliament: Kimani Ichung'wah
- Wards: 5

Kikuyu Constituency is an electoral constituency in Kenya. It is one of twelve constituencies in Kiambu County and was established during the 1963 elections. From the period 1988 elections were held until the 2002 elections were held in Kenya, it was known as Kabete Constituency. With the new demarcation of constituencies by the Independent Electoral and Boundaries Commission (IEBC), the constituency was split into two and now we have Kikuyu Constituency and Kabete Constituency.

== Leadership ==
The Current Member of Parliament for Kikuyu Constituency Anthony Kĩmani Ichung'wah who was elected on The United Democratic Alliance (UDA) ticket . He is the Leader of the Majority Party in the National Assembly for the 13th National Assembly. He was the Chairman of the Budget and Appropriations Committee (2017–19) also the Vice - Chairman of the Public Investments Committee (2013–2017), a Member of the committee of Powers and Privileges and equally a Member of the Departmental Committee on Agriculture, Livestock and Co-operatives in parliament in the 11th and 12th Parliament. Kikuyu Constituency borders Kabete, Limuru, Westlands and Dagoreti South Constituencies. The constituency had its name changed to Kabete Constituency before the 2007 General Elections and Later in 2012 during the review of boundaries by the Independent Electoral Boundaries Commission (IEBC), the constituency was split into two, thereby creating Kikuyu and Kabete constituencies Respectively.

== Economy ==
Kikuyu Constituency has registered rapid growth in the recent past due to the demand for housing which the construction sector is rapidly trying to match and improved education and roads network. More and more housing units are being put up, especially on plots with close proximity to the road. The area provides a conducive area for habitation due to the elaborate infrastructure and proximity to Nairobi where most individuals work. The region has a mixture of urban and semi-urban lifestyles which makes it possible for people to access food easily from surrounding farmers as well as access other social amenities with ease.

Other constituencies within Kiambu county are; Limuru, Lari, Gatundu North, Gatundu South, Juja, Thika Town, Ruiru, Githunguri, Kiambu and Kiambaa.

== Members of Parliament ==
| Elections | MP | Party | Notes |
|---|---|---|---|
| 2022 | Kĩmani Ichung'wa | UDA | |
| 2017 | Kĩmani Ichung'wah | Jubilee | |
| 2013 | Kimani Ichung'wah | TNA | |
| 2007 | Lewis Nguyai Nganga | PNU | |
| 2002 | Paul Kibugi Muite | Safina | |
| 1997 | Paul Kibugi Muite | Safina | |
| 1992 | Paul Kibugi Muite | Ford-K | |
| 1988 | Peter Kabibi Kinyanjui | KANU | One-party system. |
| 1983 | Peter Kabibi Kinyanjui | KANU | One-party system. |
| 1980 | Charles Njonjo | KANU | By-elections. One-party system. |
| 1979 | Amos Ng'ang'a | KANU | One-party system |
| 1974 | Amos Ng’ang’a | KANU | One-party system |
| 1969 | Joseph Kararahe Gatuguta | KANU | One-party system |
| 1963 | Joseph Kararahe Gatuguta | KANU | |

== Wards ==
| Ward | Registered Voters |
|---|---|
| Sigona | 19,571 |
| Karai | 15,710 |
| Kikuyu | 30,130 |
| Kinoo | 19,303 |
| Nachu | 14,044 |
| Total | 98,758 |
