= Kimani =

Kimani is a surname of Kenyan origin that may refer to:

- Anthony Kimani (born 1989), Kenyan footballer
- Eddy Kimani (born 1978), Kenyan actor
- Esther Kimani, Kenyan engineer
- Harry Kimani (born 1982), Kenyan musician and composer
- Humphrey Kimani Njuguna (born 1961), Kenyan politician
- Joseph Kimani (1972–2012), Kenyan long-distance runner
- Kevin Kimani (born 1989), Kenyan footballer
- Lucia Kimani (born 1981), Kenyan-Bosnian marathon runner
- Martin Kimani (born 1971), Kenyan ambassador to the United Nations
- Peter Kimani Ndung'u (born 1966), Kenyan Roman Catholic prelate
- Samwel Mushai Kimani, Kenyan visually impaired runner
- Sarah Kimani (born 1990), Kenyan journalist
- Victoria Kimani (born 1984), Kenyan-American singer
- Waruingi Kimani (born 1962), Kenyan wrestler
- Wendy Kimani (born 1986), Kenyan singer
- Willie Kimani (1984–2016), Kenyan human rights lawyer

== Kimani as a given name ==
- Kimani Ffriend (born 1977), Jamaican basketball player
- Kimani Griffin (born 1990), American speed skater
- Kimani Herring (born 1975), American football player
- Kimani Ichung'wah (born 1978), Kenyan politician
- Kimani Jack (born 2004), British high jumper
- Kimani Jones (born 1981), American football player
- Kimani Maruge (1920–2009), Guinness World Record holder
- Kimani Melius (born 2001), West Indian cricketer
- Kimani Njogu (born 1953), Kenyan linguist
- Kimani Stewart-Baynes (born 2005), Canadian soccer player
- Kimani Toussaint, American professor and academic
- Kimani Vidal (born 2001), American football player
- Kimani Young, American men's basketball coach
