= Lougué =

Lougué is a surname. Notable people with the surname include:

- Hortense Lougué, Burkinabé activist
- Kouamé Lougué, Burkinabé politician
