= Becky Shah =

British human rights activist

- Born: March 1972 (age 54); Denmark
- Occupation: Human rights activist

Becky Shah is a British woman human rights defender who is the daughter of Inger Shah, who at age 38 was one of the victims of the Hillsborough disaster. Shah was a longtime campaigner for the reopening of the Hillsborough inquiry into the causes of the disaster, and has campaigned to defend the Human Rights Act.

Inger Shah had attended the match along with her son, Daniel, who survived. As their mother was a single parent, Becky and her brother (aged 17 and 13) were taken into care following her death. For the inquests she gave an account of her mother’s life.

Following the Hillsborough disaster, West Midlands police took statements from Shah and her brother that attempted to suggest that their mother had been drinking.

She wrote for Amnesty International following the inquiry verdict in 2016 that "The determination of our campaign and the power of the Human Rights Act were crucial in securing the verdict on 26 April 2016". Shah has supported Amnesty International's campaign to prevent the repeal of the Human Rights Act following Britain's withdrawal from the European Union.

Along with relatives of the other 97 victims of the Hillsborough disaster, Shah has severely criticised the Crown Prosecution Service decision not to open criminal proceedings into the conduct of West Midlands Police.

Shah has also supported families campaigning for inquests into the deaths of their relatives in police custody.
