= Paradise Lost Caves =

Cave system in Kiambu County, Kenya

- Location: Misarara, Kiambu County, Kenya
- Discovery: 1996

Paradise Lost Caves are a cave system located in Kiambu County, Kenya. They were discovered officially by Joseph Mbai and some of his farmhands on his property in 1996. A National Museums of Kenya expedition uncovered human remains dated back 8000-12000 years, along with obsidian artifacts from the Later Stone Age. The caves are outfitted with electric lighting for tours that pass through, but can be difficult to traverse due to caves becoming very narrow at points.
