= Ahlia University =

University in Bahrain

Coordinates: 26.2359°N 50.5930°E

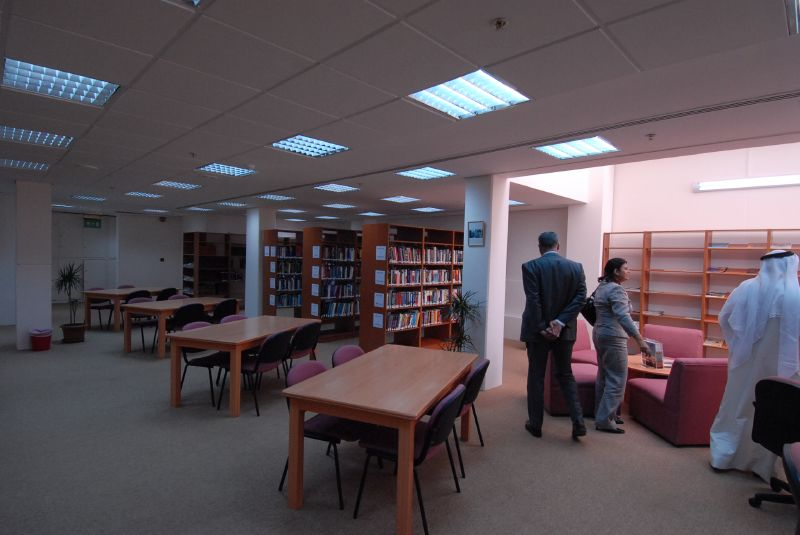
- Type: Private
- Established: 2001; 25 years ago
- Affiliation: Ahlia School
- President: Prof. Mansoor Alali
- Location: Manama, Bahrain
- Website: www.ahlia.edu.bh

Ahlia University (AU) is a private, not-for-profit university in Manama, Bahrain and owned by a private holding company, The Arab Academy for Research and Studies (AARS). The holding company is collectively owned by a group of companies and individuals from the Gulf Cooperation Council.

The AU project became a reality when the Government of Bahrain issued the Cabinet Decision No. 03-1626 dated March 2001, making it the first private university to be licensed by the government.

Ahlia University has five colleges:

- College of Arts and Science
- College of Business and Finance
- College of Engineering
- College of Information Technology
- College of Medical and Health Sciences...

The university includes a deanship of student affairs and a deanship of graduate studies and research, in addition to a number of centres.

In 2021, Ahila University partnered with Huawei to establish both the Huawei ICT Academy, as well as a research organization focusing on the Internet of things.

University rankings

Global – Overall
- QS World: 801-850 (2026)

== See also ==
- List of universities in Bahrain
