= Gathanga =

- Location within Kenya
- Coordinates: 1.18°S 36.8°E
- Country: Kenya
- County: Kiambu County
- Time zone: UTC+3 (EAT)

Gathanga is a settlement in Kenya's Kiambu County. It is situated within Kiambu County, which is known for its agricultural activities, including tea and coffee farming. Gathanga lies near the larger town of Kiambu, and the region around it is primarily rural.

The local population engages in farming as the main economic activity, with small-scale farmers cultivating crops like maize, beans, and bananas. The settlement is also known for having community services such as local schools and small markets serving the residents.

Due to its rural nature, Gathanga experiences limited urban development, but it benefits from its proximity to Kiambu and Nairobi, Kenya's capital city.
