= Women human rights defenders =

Human rights defender

Women human rights defenders (WHRDs) are women who defend human rights, and defenders of all genders who defend the rights of women and rights related to gender and sexuality. Their work and the challenges they face have been recognized by a United Nations (UN) resolution in 2013, which calls for specific protection for women human rights defenders.

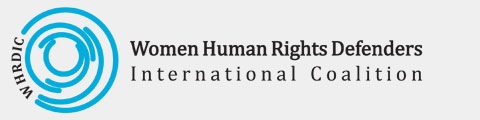
This is the logo for the Women Human Rights Defenders International Coalition that represents the coming together and discussing problematic issues dealing with human rights for all.

A woman human rights defender can be an Indigenous woman fighting for the rights of her community, a woman advocating against torture, an LGBTQI rights campaigner, a sex workers' rights collective, or a man fighting for sexual and reproductive rights.

Like other human rights defenders, women human rights defenders can be the target of attacks as they demand the realization of human rights. They face attacks such as discrimination, assault, threats, and violence within their communities. Women human rights defenders face additional obstacles based on who they are and the specific rights they defend. This means they are targeted just because they are women, LGBTI people or for identifying with their struggles. They also face additional obstacles connected with Institutional discrimination and inequality and because they challenge, or are seen to be challenging, patriarchal power and social norms. They are more at risk of facing gender based violence in the home and the community, and sexist, misogynistic, homophobic, trans-phobic threats, smears and stigmatization, as well as exclusion from resources and power.

International Women Human Rights Defenders Day has been celebrated each 29 November since 2006.

== Examples of contemporary WHRDs ==
- Morena Herrera (El Salvador)
- Estela de Carlotto (Argentina)
- Aura Lolita Chavez Ixcaquic (Guatemala)
- Maxima Acuna (Peru)
- Sheyene Gerardi (Venezuela)
- Sonia Pierre (Dominican Republic)
- Su Changlan (China)
- Leila de Lima (Philippines)
- Angkhana Neelapaijit (Thailand)
- Hina Jilani (Pakistan)
- Reema Omer (Pakistan)
- Shazia George (Pakistan) (Former Member, Punjab Commission on the Status of Women)
- Azza Soliman (Egypt)
- Narges Mohammadi (Iran)
- Loujain Al-Hathlou (Saudi Arabia)
- Katana Gégé Bukuru (DR Congo)
- Salimata Lam (Mauritania)
- Delphine Djiraibe (Chad)
- Lydia Foy (Ireland)
- Marjan Sax (Netherlands)
- Anina Ciuciu (France/Romania)
- Anna Mokrousova (Ukraine)
- Chonthicha Jaengraew (Thailand)
- Hortense Louge (Burkina Faso)
- Caoimhe Butterly (Ireland)
- Geraldine Chacón (Venezuela)
- Marfa Rabkova (Belarus)

The following is a list of WHRDs killed because of their human rights activism:

- Pranee Boonrat (Thailand)
- Salwa Bugaighis (Libya)
- Montha Chukaew (Thailand)
- Miroslava Breach (Mexico)
- Berta Cáceres (Honduras)
- Elizabeth Ibrahim Ekaru, Kenya
- Almaas Elman (Somalia/Canada)
- Natalia Estemirova (Russia)
- Marielle Franco (Brazil)
- David Kato (Uganda)
- Hande Kader (Turkey)
- Gauri Lankesh (India)
- Dr George Tiller (USA)
- Xulhaz Mannan (Bangladesh)
- Noxolo Nogwaza (South Africa)
- Joannah Stutchbury, Kenya
