= International Justice Mission =

International human rights organization

- Formation: 1997; 29 years ago
- Founder: Gary Haugen
- Type: INGO
- Legal status: 501(c)(3) organization
- Headquarters: Washington, D.C., US
- CEO: Gary Haugen
- Endowment: $105 million
- Website: www.ijm.org

International Justice Mission is an international non-governmental organization focused on human rights and law enforcement. It was founded in 1997 by lawyer Gary Haugen in Washington, D.C. All IJM employees are required to be practicing Christians, and 94% are nationals of the countries they work in.

IJM works to combat sex trafficking, child sexual exploitation, cybersex trafficking, forced labor, forced scamming, slavery, property grabbing, and police abuse of power, and addresses citizenship rights of minorities. Some have criticized IJM’s law-enforcement based approach to combating sex trafficking, alleging that police and legal actions such as brothel raids and prosecutions have included voluntary sex workers. Others have alleged that its target-driven prosecution requirements intended for traffickers have led to misidentified targets in their rescue operations.

== History ==
=== Founding ===
The International Justice Mission was founded in 1997 as a faith-based non-profit by American lawyer Gary Haugen of the United States. In its first case, the organization aided the arrest of a rape suspect in Manila, Philippines. In 1998, IJM claimed to have helped rescue more than 700 people. In addition to helping clients with legal representation, Haugen decided his organization could have more influence by partnering with governments of developing countries to help improve their legal systems.

As of November 2022, IJM has two country programs (out of 30 total) that focus on sex trafficking: Kenya-Mombasa, Romania, and the Dominican Republic.

The other 26 program offices work on forced labor (Romania; Ghana; Malaysia; Thailand; Cambodia; Indonesia; Myanmar; India; Philippines); domestic violence and sexual assault (Uganda; Kenya; Colombia; Guatemala; El Salvador; Bolivia; and Peru) and police violence (Kenya.)

=== Work in Thailand ===
IJM has worked in northern Thailand through IJM's Chiang Mai field office (FO) since 2000, partnering with government authorities on hill tribe Thai citizenship cases and cases of sexual violence against children. Over the early 2000s IJM was involved in work to target the sex worker industry. These included a number of brothel raids in Northern Thailand which were the subject of criticisms at the time due to their impact on non-coerced adults. In 2017, IJM started a new field office in Bangkok and in 2018 IJM Foundation was established to provide support to Thai authorities to eliminate labor trafficking and forced labor from the Thai fishing and seafood industries after a 2017 study found 38% of fisherman on Thai fishing vessels identified as trafficking victims.

=== Work in Cambodia ===
IJM has worked with Cambodian authorities to combat child sex trafficking for over 25 years. An external Evaluation of the International Justice Mission's Program to Combat Sex Trafficking of Children in Cambodia, reports that between 2003 and 2013, IJM trained a total of 504 persons, including 481 police officials and 23 other trainees, including DoSVY, NGO partners, and Deputy Governors of Districts in Siem Reap Province.

IJM director Gary Haugen invited the American television show Dateline (NBC) to film a March 29, 2003 raid which it planned to conduct at a large Cambodian brothel in the village of Svay Pak. The brothel contained approximately 40 girls, many under the age of 10, who were detained by Thai police along with 12 accused pimps and madams. A noodle vendor, who had no involvement with the brothel, was among those who were arrested in the raid; the noodle vendor subsequently died in jail of a stroke. IJM later contracted with a Cambodian human rights organization, LICADHO, to review its actions in organizing the raid. Peter Sainsbury, the consultant who reviewed the raid, said that he had told IJM about his medical concerns about the noodle vendor, but that his concerns were ignored. At least twelve of the victims "rescued" from the 2003 Svay Pak raid ran away from the safe house to which they were taken. In a brothel raid a year later there, a number of girls rescued from the 2003 raid were found to be involved again in sex work.

While IJM considered these "rescues" to be successes, critics questioned the organization's tactics, saying raids on brothels do not focus on the root causes of child prostitution, have led to the arrests of people not in the sex trade, and hindered HIV-prevention initiatives.

=== Work in Ghana ===
In Ghana IJM has been engaged in identifying instances of child labour and trafficking since 2014. Children as young as age 4 have been subjected to forced labor in fishing in the areas around Lake Volta, sometimes as a result of human trafficking. In 2017 IJM Ghana team and local authorities rescued 31 children believed to be engaged in forced labor from fishing communities within the area of Lake Volta and placed them into custody. The authorities who placed the children into custody included representatives from Ghanaian social welfare agencies within the government.

=== Murder of Willie Kimani ===
On June 30, 2016, Willie Kimani, a Kenyan IJM lawyer, and two persons, including an IJM client, were found murdered and dumped in a river outside Nairobi in Kenya. They were last seen alive at a police station. Three police officers and a civilian informant were charged with murder and later found guilty in 2022. Haugen denounced the killings as "an intolerable outrage and should serve as an abrupt wake-up call to the blatant injustices committed daily and incessantly against the poor and vulnerable around the world". Kimani was posthumously named 'Jurist of the Year' by the International Commission of Jurists, Kenya Section, in December 2016.

=== Expansion ===
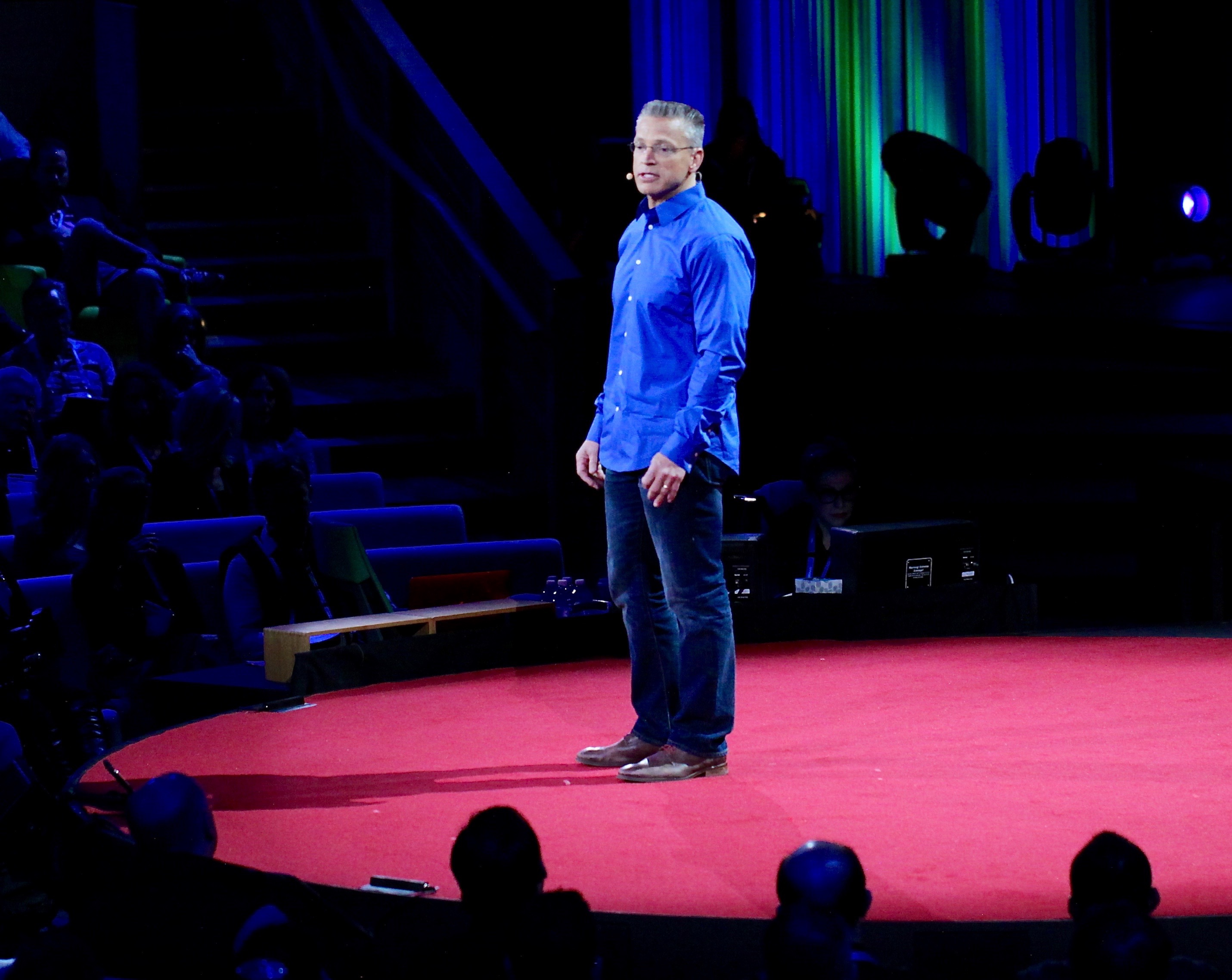
Gary Haugen delivering his TED Talk in Vancouver, 2015

International Justice Mission expanded its work beyond prevention of sex trafficking. By 2009 its lawyers, social workers and advocates also helped victims whose land had been seized, who were bonded laborers, or who were falsely imprisoned. In 2010 U.S. News & World Report named International Justice Mission as one of '10 Service Groups That Are Making a Difference' list. Under President Barack Obama's administration, the United States Department of State honored Haugen, International Justice Mission's founder and CEO, as a Trafficking in Persons Report Hero Acting to End Modern Slavery in 2012. The State Department said IJM helped nearly 4,000 victims and assisted in the prosecution of 220 offenders between 2006 and 2012.

In December 2011, Google awarded a total of US$11.5 million in grants to organizations to combat modern-day slavery. Google donated $9.8 million to International Justice Mission to lead a coalition focusing on fighting slavery in India, in addition to running advocacy and education programs in the country, and mobilizing Americans.

IJM CEO Gary Haugen and Victor Boutros co-wrote The Locust Effect: Why the End of Poverty Requires the End of Violence in 2014. They won the 2016 University of Louisville Grawemeyer Award for Ideas Improving World Order for this book. Haugen gave a 19-minute TED talk on this material in Vancouver, British Columbia, Canada, in 2015.

Within 20 years of its founding, International Justice Mission had grown into an organization with a $51.6 million budget comprising more than 750 employees in 17 countries in Africa, Latin America, South Asia and Southeast Asia, and five partner offices in Canada, UK, Netherlands, Germany and Australia.

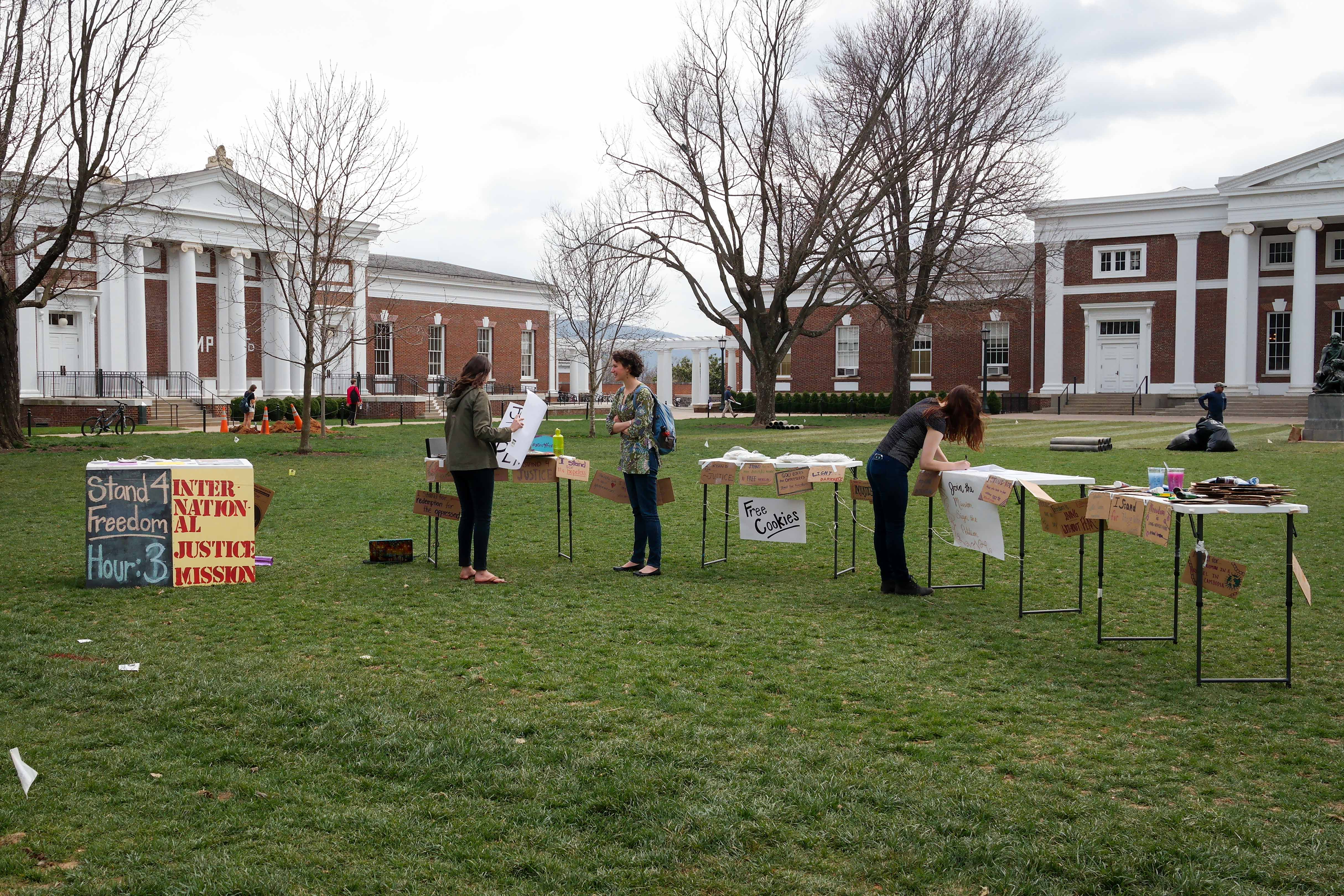
International Justice Mission volunteer work at University of Virginia

== Programs ==
International Justice Mission represents victims in cases of sex trafficking, forced labor, slavery, abuse of police power, theft of property and citizenship rights. It also works with the governments of developing countries to improve justice systems.

IJM hires only practicing Christians; its job listings include "Mature orthodox Christian faith as defined by the Apostles' Creed" among stated requirements. Workdays at all offices begin with a half-hour of stillness and a half-hour of corporate prayer later in the day as part of their spiritual formation practices.

Through Project Lantern, International Justice Mission worked to develop a model for combatting sex slavery and human trafficking that other organizations and agencies could use. In 2010, IJM reported the project documented a 79 percent decrease in the number of minors sold for sex in Cebu, Philippines. Project Lantern was funded by a $5 million grant from the Bill & Melinda Gates Foundation in 2006.

In addition to its aforementioned work, International Justice Mission runs programs to train criminal justice departments and governments and provides legal aid. The organization runs programs to help victims recover from their time in forced labor. Additionally, IJM has endorsed proposed legislation in Washington, D.C., to enhance anti-trafficking efforts, including the End Modern Slavery Initiative.

Investigations from third-party sources have presented some negative outcomes of IJM's work. A United States Agency for International Development-funded census of sex workers in Cambodia in 2003 found that underage prostitution increased in the area in the months following a series of brothel rescue missions organized by IJM. A researcher said that's because the girls have debt contracts and families are pressured to pay back those debts after the girls are rescued. The Nation reported that under Thai law at the time of specific raids in Thailand, voluntary sex workers faced deportation after raids. In the Philippines, The Nation reported, "a number of the women and girls" housed in a government-run facility following rescue missions escaped. In 2016, Holly Burkhalter, IJM's senior advisor for Justice System Transformation, said that within 10 years of working with the government in Cambodia, less than 1 percent of victims of sex trafficking were minors.

Presidents George W. Bush and Barack Obama have both commended IJM for its work. During International Women's Day on 12 March 2004, Bush extolled the work of an IJM official in charge of anti-trafficking operations. Bush went on to state that the U.S. government would stand by IJM's mission to end sex slavery. In 2012, Obama said International Justice Mission was "truly doing the Lord's work" during the annual meeting of the Clinton Global Initiative.

== Governance and financials ==
International Justice Mission's global headquarters is located in Washington, D.C. It is governed by a 13-member international board of directors, which includes founder and CEO Gary Haugen. As of 2016, Nicole Bibbins Sedaca chairs the board.

On June 1, 2016, the independent charity watchdog Charity Navigator gave International Justice Mission four stars with an overall score of 92.15 out of 100. The organization scored 88.91 for its finances, and 100 for accountability and transparency.

According to a 2015 independent auditor's report by RSM US, International Justice Mission generated $51.56 million in total support and revenue in 2015. The organization's expenses totaled $52.25 million. Year-end net assets were $20.03 million.

International Justice Mission's 2015 funding came primarily from individuals (71%), in addition to foundations and businesses (12%), IJM partner offices (6%), churches (4%), gifts-in-kind (4%), government grants (1%) and other sources (2%). Programs accounted for 75% of expenses, general and administrative costs for 12%, and expenditures for fundraising for 13%.

Among its grants, the United States Department of Labor awarded International Justice Mission a three-year cooperative agreement on September 30, 2002. The nearly $703,000 grant helped implement the Thailand Sex Trafficking Task Force: Prevention and Placement program. Then-U.S. Secretary of State Colin Powell provided the organization with a $1 million grant to combat sex trafficking in Southeast Asia in 2004. Bill & Melinda Gates Foundation awarded a $5 million grant in 2006. On December 14, 2011, the Google Foundation awarded $11.5 million to organizations fighting modern slavery. Among the groups to receive those funds were International Justice Mission, BBC World Service Trust, ActionAid India and Aide et Action.

== Criticism ==
IJM has aroused criticism over its tactics and mission. Much of the criticism stems from IJM's role in organizing brothel raids and subsequent arrests or deportations of sex workers. Others have criticized IJM for hindering HIV prevention efforts and for maligning local organizations which have questioned its tactics. Still others have questioned IJM's focus on law enforcement tactics and close coordination with police agencies to carry out a human rights mission. In July 2023 a BBC News investigation alleged that Ghanaian children had been wrongly taken in raids backed by the IJM. In a secretly filmed conversation with a senior IJM staff member, a reporter was told that IJM staff needed to rescue a set number of victims and secure a set number of prosecutions every year. Another staff member said that IJM staff were denied pay rises or were at risk of being sacked if they did not reach these targets.

=== Brothel Raids in Thailand ===
In the year 2000, and again in 2003, IJM instigated a raid on a karaoke restaurant in Chiang Mai, Northern Thailand. Thai police later twice raided the establishment, arresting and subsequently deporting the women who worked there. IJM characterized the operations as successful "rescues". In another raid in 2001, IJM sent men undercover to a brothel, used hidden cameras and produced a 25-page document alleging specific violations of Thai law. Police raided the brothel and detained 43 female sex workers. Some of the women detained by police said that they were working voluntarily and had not wished to leave the brothel. About half the group subsequently escaped; some apparently feared deportation to Burma. After the 2000 and 2003 raids on the Chiang Mai restaurant, IJM requested other local non-governmental organizations to provide translation assistance when its employees realized that the sex workers were not Thai citizens. After providing translation assistance, the Shan Women's Action Network said that the raids had grossly violated the women's human rights. The group pointed out that although IJM had twice conducted a raid on the same establishment, it failed to protect the women from prosecution and further victimization. In later years IJM moderated its initial assertion that the Thailand brothel raids were successful. In a 2012 article, Holly Burkhalter, IJM's vice president for Government Relations, characterized the 2003 raid as "one of the few IJM cases in which law enforcement treatment of non-coerced adults did not meet IJM standards."

=== Maligning local organizations ===
IJM organized brothel raids have been accused of interfering with public health and HIV-prevention efforts, some of which took place at the brothels themselves. In response, IJM has stated that sex workers can instead go to clinics for such information. When Thai organization EMPOWER raised questions about the televised brothel raid, Empower staff say IJM accused their organization of supporting pimps. The International Union of Sex Workers criticizes IJM's work as being focused on Christianity, and for presenting anyone involved in sex work, coerced or not, in the role of a victim awaiting salvation. It states that crackdowns drive prostitution further underground. Others have criticized brothel raids more generally as an ineffective way to fight human trafficking, likely to cause harm to those allegedly rescued, and disruptive of public health efforts.

=== IJM response to criticism ===
After The Nation published a series of critical articles about IJM in 2009, IJM published a document to clarify and explain its mission and tactics. Its piece says that IJM operations with local police are focused solely on securing for children and trafficked women the right to be free from commercial sexual exploitation and that IJM supports HIV-prevention efforts. It says that it has introduced protocols to local law enforcement that address the appropriate treatment of non-trafficked adults who work in the brothel with minors. IJM has refused to share these protocols with reporters. IJM states that it supports "placing child trafficking victims in secure environments from which they cannot leave".

IJM's Holly Burkhalter, Vice President of Government Relations and Advocacy, formerly with Human Rights Watch and Physicians for Human Rights, wrote an article, "Sex Trafficking, Law Enforcement and Perpetrator Accountability", presenting IJM positions on these issues. It was published in the first issue of the new journal, Anti-Trafficking Review, published in June 2012.
