= Alice Wambui Ng'ang'a =

Kenyan politician

- Education: Africa Nazarene University
- Occupation: politician

Alice Wambūi Ng'ang'a or Alice Wambūi is a Kenyan politician who was elected to be the Member of Parliament for the Thika Town Constituency in Kiambu County.

== Life ==
Wambūi started at St. Annes Lioki in 1989 and in 1992 she left, starting Africa Nazarene University in 2003. She graduated in 2006 with a degree in banking and finance.

She stood at the 2010 by-election as a Kenya National Congress candidate. The winner took 42,000 votes and she followed with nearly 25,000. In the 2017 election she was beaten by Patrick Wainaina. In 2015 she successfully completed an MBA qualification with Kenya's Daystar University.

At the 2022 elections she was the United Democratic Alliance candidate and she was elected to serve Thika Town constituency.

In April 2024 she called for the extension of school holidays following the flooding that had resulted in the deaths of 70 people. She argued that an extra week would allow the government to better assess the situation.
