= Mama Ngina University College =

University College in Kenya

- Other names: MNUC
- Motto in English: "Shaping the Future"
- Type: Public University
- Established: September 17, 2021
- Parent institution: Kenyatta University
- Chairperson: Dr. Dinah J. C. Mwinzi
- Principal: Prof. Zipporah Ng'ang'a
- Location: Gatundu South, Kiambu County, Kenya; 1°02′14″S 36°55′24″E
- Language: English
- Website: mnu.ac.ke

Mama Ngina University College (MNUC) is a public institution and a constituent college of Kenyatta University. It was formally gazetted by the Ministry of Education on 17 September 2021 through Kenya Gazette Supplement No. 177, Legal Notice No. 193. Afterwards, on 3 December 2021, the Government, through the Ministry of Education, appointed the first MNUC Council via Gazette Notice No. 13129. The first Chairman of Council was Dr. David Oginde.

== Location ==
Mama Ngina University College is located along Kenyatta Road in Mutomo (Ngenda Ward), Gatundu South, Kiambu County, Kenya. It is approximately 43 km North of Nairobi and about 14 km off the Thika Superhighway.

== History ==
MNUC was initially placed under the mentorship of Moi University before being transferred to Kenyatta University in 2017. Kenyatta University acquired land in Mutomo for the establishment of the University College.

In April 2019, the then Chancellor of Kenyatta University, Dr. Benson Wairegi, presided over the groundbreaking ceremony for the construction of an administration block and lecture theatre. The first phase of construction was completed in July 2021. Following inspection and recommendation by the Commission for University Education (CUE), MNUC was gazetted as a constituent college of Kenyatta University on 17 September 2021, with its inaugural cohort of students reporting on 4 October 2021.

== Management ==
The Chairperson of the University College Council is Dr. Dinah J. C. Mwinzi. The Principal is Prof. Zipporah Ng'ang'a, who previously served in senior leadership roles at South Eastern Kenya University and Jomo Kenyatta University of Agriculture and Technology. The Deputy Principal is Prof. Thomas Sakwa.

== Academics ==
=== Schools ===
MNUC comprises three Schools:

- School of Pure and Applied Sciences
- School of Business, Economics and Humanities
- School of Health Sciences

=== Programmes ===
The University College offers undergraduate and postgraduate degree programmes accredited by the Commission for University Education in Kenya. It also offers short professional courses through collaborations with Cisco Networking Academy, Huawei ICT Academy and IBM Skills Academy.

=== Undergraduate Degree Programmes ===
- Bachelor of Commerce (B. COM)
- Bachelor of Economics and Finance
- Bachelor of Economics and Statistics
- Bachelor of Arts (Counselling Psychology)
- Bachelor of Public Policy and Administration
- Bachelor of Science in Nursing
- Bachelor of Science (Population Health)
- Bachelor of Science (Health Records and Information Management)
- Bachelor of Science in Computer Science
- Bachelor of Science in Hospitality and Tourism Management
- Bachelor of Science (Environmental Health)
- Bachelor of Information Technology
- Bachelor of Science (Mathematics and Computer Science)
- Bachelor of Environmental Studies and Community Development
- Bachelor of Science (Statistics and Programming)
- Bachelor of Library and Information Science
- Bachelor of Science (Community Resource Management)

=== Master's Degree Programmes ===
- Master of Business Administration
- Master of Economics
- Master of Science (Climate Change and Sustainability)
- Master of Environmental Science

=== PhD Programmes ===
- PhD in Business Administration

== Student Services ==
The institution provides digital learning platforms, ICT support and various co-curricular activities which include indoor and outdoor games.

The University College hosts annual Cultural Week Festivals that showcase the Kenya's cultural diversity and concludes with student competitions which include Mr. and Miss MNUC pageant.

MNUC organizes annual Career Week which brings together students, industry leaders and professionals for exhibitions, mentorship and networking. The event aims that aligning the academic preparation with the job market.

== Partnerships and Engagement ==
Mama Ngina University College has established collaborations with both national and international organizations which include:

- Kenya National Bureau of Statistics (KNBS) on the following areas: Joint research, data sharing and mentorship.
- Kenya Commercial Bank (KCB) on the following areas: scholarships, internship, infrastructure and endowment programmes.
- Qejani Hostels in provision of affordable housing for students.
- DigiFunzi in training and mentorship in digital literacy.
- Tech Innovators Network (THINK) in co-hosting artificial intelligence hackathons, supporting students' AI projects and research.
- SKIES Rapid Tech Skills Development Program (World Bank-Funded) in training in cybersecurity, data science, software engineering and other ICT related fields.
- Kenya National Chamber of Commerce and Industry (KNCCI), Kiambu Chapter on the following areas: Skills training, policy engagement and community outreach within Kiambu County and beyond.
- The 5th Integrated Free medical camp, held in partnership with various hospitals, took place in October 2025, and served both the University College clients and community members.

== See also ==
- Kenyatta University
- Moi University
- Commission for University Education (Kenya)
