= Joannah Stutchbury =

Kenyan environmental activist (c.1954–2021)

- fair use image
- Born: c.1954
- Died: 15 July 2021; Nairobi
- Cause of death: shot
- Citizenship: Kenyan
- Occupations: land and environmental rights defender activist
- Known for: protecting Kiambu Forest in Kenya

Joannah Stutchbury (c.1954 - 2021) was a Kenyan land and environmental rights defender activist. She was one of the leading conservationists of the environment of Kenyan forests, who is remembered for trying to protect Kiambu forest from encroachment. She helped the Kenya Forest Service. She was shot and killed on 15 July 2021 at the age of 67. Joannah was the great-niece of Jim Corbett.

== Life ==
Stutchbury was born in about 1954 and she lived in Kiambu which is nearly twenty kilometres from the centre of Nairobi.

She was campaigning against the developers encroaching on the Kiambu Forest near Nairobi. 16% of Kiambu County, 40,000 hectares are covered by forest. The trees are used for wood fuel as there is a high demand for both charcoal and firewood. Tree planting projects are in progress as the trees face increasing temperatures due to climate change.

Stutchbury had spoken out against land-grabbers and noted private developers. In 2018, she hit the headlines when she single-handedly confronted those developers. The developers were felling trees in the Kiambu Forests. She was told by unknown people that they would kill her if she continued intervening in their plan to constructing a roadway through the forest.

On 15 July 2021, Joannah Stutchbury was shot dead near her home, allegedly because of her campaign against the development of wetlands in a national park. She stopped her car to clear branches blocking her driveway when she was shot several times. Later, her neighbours found her body in her car. Her car engine was still running. Her valuables were still in the vehicle. From that, it was surmised that the attack was not a robbery. Stutchbury had raised her voice against the encroachment and building up of structures in the nearby Kiambu Forest. Before the incident, she had received multiple death threats, but nevertheless continued to stand for the environment until her death. She owned land which she protected as she refused to sell it. She had discussed moving away because of the pressures.

This was the first death of an environmentalist in Kenya for a year although eight had died in Africa. No quick arrests were made. The World Forest Organisation petitioned the president of Kenya, to protect an area of the forest at national level, in honour of Joannah.

Stutchbury's murder has been considered as extrajudicial together with the 2022 death of journalist Arshad Sharif, blogger Daniel Muthiani in 2023 and human rights lawyer Willie Kimani who died in 2016.
