= Anna Mokrousova =

Hanna Mokrousova
- Born: 29 April 1981 (age 44); Luhansk
- Education: Taras Shevchenko National University of Luhansk and East Ukrainian Volodymyr Dahl National University
- Occupations: Human rights activist, volunteer, psychologist
- Organization: NGO Blue Bird

Hanna Mokrousova is the Ukrainian human rights defender, psychologist and a co-founder of Blue Bird, an organisation that tracks information about civilians kidnapped or disappeared in the Eastern Ukraine and provides psychological, legal and humanitarian help to their families.

== Biography ==
Anna Mokrousova was born on 29 April 1981 in Luhansk. She studied practical psychology at Taras Shevchenko National University of Luhansk and East Ukrainian Volodymyr Dahl National University.

== Activism ==
Mokrousova participated in the Euromaidan Revolution in 2014 in Kyiv working with psychological care team.

When Russian military intervention in Ukraine started in February 2014, many people have been reported missing or kidnapped, mostly by separatist and pro-Russian armed groups. At that time Mokrousova was an activist in Luhansk and did live streams of separatist rebels when they took Ukrainian military bases and government buildings in Luhansk. Mokrousova was kidnapped herself in Luhansk in 2014. Speaking about the problems former hostages face:

"There is no state program of assistance and support for people who survived the captivity. Former prisoners of war can get a medical examination, but they do not have a special status. However, the civilians who survived the captivity, do not receive any help from the state at all, although the overwhelming majority of them, after the captivity, are displaced people: without housing, without work, without essential things, with a multitude of health problems. Today, virtually all programs of psychological assistance and social rehabilitation are carried out by representatives of NGOs and volunteers"

In 2014 Mokrousova became a coordinator of the Public Initiative Vostok-SOS, a civil initiative focused on protecting human rights during the conflict period, supporting internally displaced people. In 2015 she co-founded the NGO Blue Bird. The organization is focused on work with people who are reported missing or are illegally detained in Donbas. Blue Bird provides professional psychological support and assistance, as well as medical screening of and legal aid to the victims of abductions. Mokrousova and Blue Bird also gather medication and food for the hostages, provide psychological and rehabilitation assistance for those released and their families. Blue Bird also collects information about people who are illegally detained, held hostage or missing in Donbas, carry out public control over law-enforcement bodies. The organization has assembled a database of the missing Ukrainian military and civilians who were illegally detained in Anti-Terrorist Operation zone.

== Honors ==
In December 2014 Anna Mokrousova received Volunteer Award in the nomination “For Protecting Truth”.
