= Sarah Kimani =

Kenyan journalist (born 1990)

- Citizenship: Kenyan
- Education: Alliance Girls High school
- Title: Journalist

Sarah Kimani is a Kenyan journalist based in Nairobi who is currently the Southeast African Correspondent of the South African Broadcasting Corporation. In 2005 she won an award as a CNN African journalist of the year in environment category. (SABC)

== Early life ==
Sarah was born in Karura, Kiambu County. She later moved to live in Korogocho, Nairobi with her parents.

== Education ==
After Sarah completed her primary education, she joined Alliance Girls High school to pursue her secondary education. Her passion for storytelling grew after her teacher took a keen interest on how she read news stories and gave her a lot of encouragement. After high school completion, she pursued journalism as a career abroad and won an award as the CNN African Journalist of the year (Education Category) in 2004.

== Career ==
Sarah came back to Kenya and worked at Nation Media Group. Soon, she landed a job at the South African Broadcasting Corporation (SABC) in 2008. She has worked at SABC for the last 12 years.

== Her work ==
Sarah's niche is mainly on food security, environmental and wildlife conservation. She has not only worked in African media houses, but also contribute to international media houses such as Voice of America and CNN. She was also a judge and mentor at semifinals in 2019
In May 2019, Sarah did a story on how Kenyan farmers were benefiting from insurance service providers. In the event of experiencing unpredictable climatic conditions, farmers were able to prevent losses and secure themselves from paying huge amount loans. In August 2019, Sarah featured a story about how medical experts in Kenya were preventing maternal deaths by banking breast milk for new born babies. Sarah has done numerous stories for the South African Broadcasting Corporation. Since she is a special correspondent in East Africa based in Kenya, her stories revolve around food security in Kenya and East African states.

== Her work on COVID-19 ==
Since the East African region reported on its first coronavirus case, Sarah has been keen on doing stories featuring the pandemic. Her stories include: How Kenyans are coming up with alternatives to earn a living. coronavirus statistics Kenyan protests against police brutality during the pandemic

== Awards ==
- 2005 CNN African Journalist of the year (Environment Category)
