= Gary Haugen =

American lawyer (born 1963)

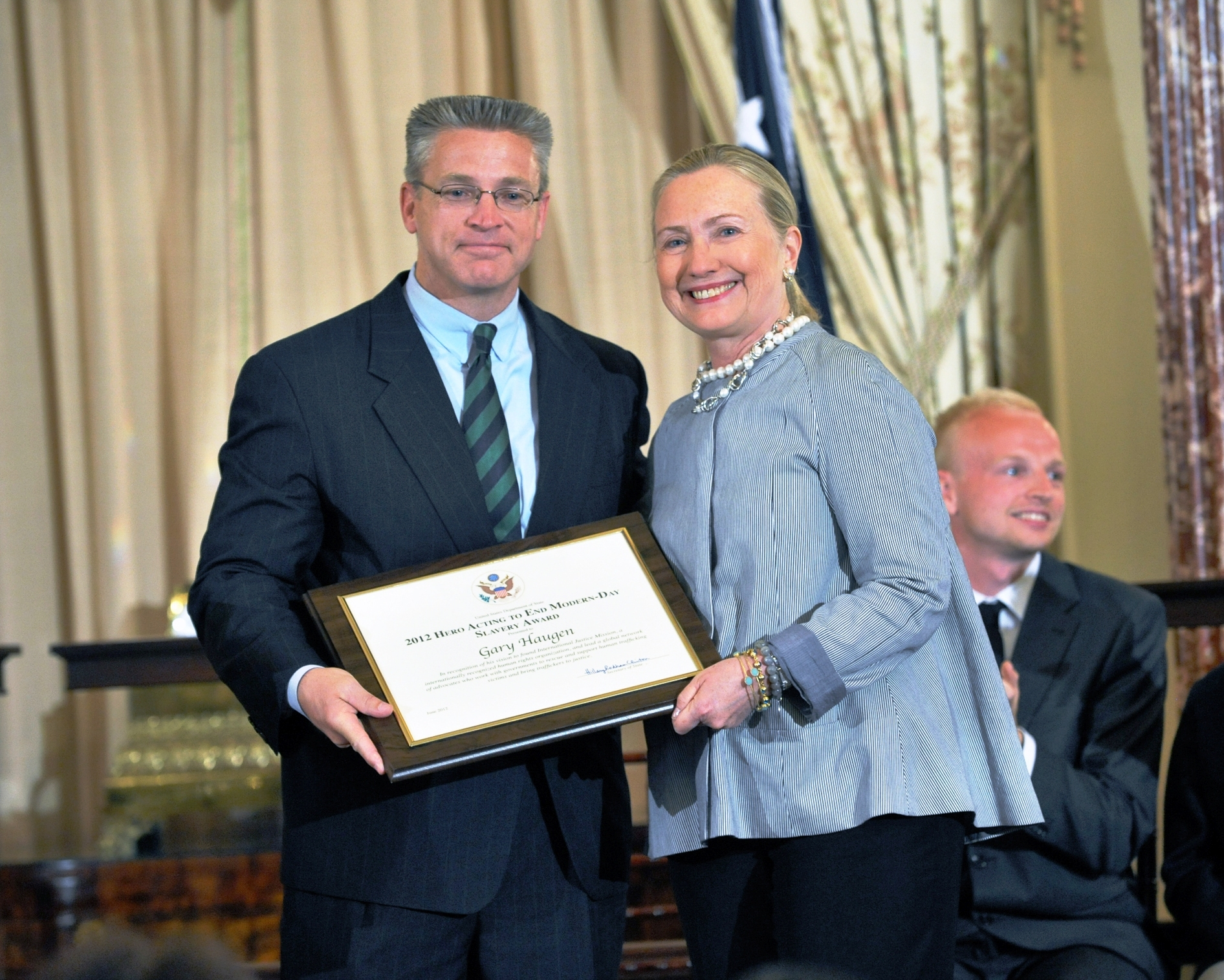
Gary Haugen receiving the Trafficking in Persons Report "Hero Award" from Hillary Clinton in 2012

Gary Alan Haugen (born April 16, 1963) is an American attorney who is the founder and CEO of International Justice Mission, a global organization which claims to "protect people in poverty from violence and slavery" International Justice Mission partners with local authorities to rescue victims of violence, bring criminals to justice, restore survivors, and strengthen justice systems. Haugen founded the organization in 1999.

== Education ==
Haugen graduated magna cum laude from Harvard College in 1985 with a B.A. in social studies and Juris Doctor from University of Chicago Law School.

== Published Works ==
Gary Haugen has authored several books and articles focused on human rights, justice systems, and the role of faith in addressing global violence. His writing often draws from his experience at the U.S. Department of Justice and his leadership at International Justice Mission.

Good News About Injustice: A Witness of Courage in a Hurting World (InterVarsity Press, 1999; revised edition 2009) In this foundational work, Haugen explores how Christian faith calls individuals to confront injustice. The book combines biblical reflection with real-world stories of modern-day oppression and rescue.

Terrify No More: Young Girls Held Captive and the Daring Undercover Operation to Win Their Freedom (Thomas Nelson, 2005) This book recounts one of IJM’s earliest and most dramatic rescue operations: the undercover operation that uncovered and ended the exploitation of minors in a Cambodian commercial sex venue.

Just Courage: God's Great Expedition for the Restless Christian (InterVarsity Press, 2008) Haugen challenges Christians to move beyond personal comfort and into a life of courageous service in the fight against injustice.

The Locust Effect: Why the End of Poverty Requires the End of Violence (Oxford University Press, 2014, co-authored with Victor Boutros) A more academic and systemic exploration, this book argues that addressing violence is essential to overcoming poverty. It was a Washington Post bestseller and received widespread acclaim in development and policy circles.

== Christian faith ==
Haugen is an engaged Christian. He is a member of the Anglican Church in North America, and spoke at their General Convention in 2014. Since founding International Justice Mission in 1997, he has described witnessing a "sea change" within the "Christian community that was [once] largely disengaged from the struggle for justice in the world," but now views care for victims of injustice as a significant issue in faith.

== Media, public appearances, and awards ==
Haugen has spoken at numerous venues around the world including Harvard University, Yale Law School, Berkeley School of Law, Pepperdine University, Stanford University, The University of Chicago Schwartz Lecture, The World Economic Forum, The World Bank, The Clinton Global Initiative, Willowcreek Leadership Summit, Passion Conference, and TED2015.

Haugen and the work of IJM have been featured by The Atlantic, Dateline NBC, The Oprah Winfrey Show, NPR, 60 Minutes II, The Today Show, Dateline NBC, NBC Nightly News, CNN, MSNBC, Fox News, BBC World News, The New York Times, The Wall Street Journal, Forbes magazine, Need Magazine, Foreign Affairs, Christianity Today, The New Yorker, and The New York Times Magazine.

Haugen was also featured in Harvard Magazine and in the University of Chicago School of Law's magazine, The Record.

In 2010, U.S. News & World Report named IJM one of the top 10 service groups making a difference in the world, describing IJM as an example of "noteworthy public service programs that are having an impact."

In 2019, Haugen received an honorary degree from Wake Forest University. He was also the keynote speaker at the Baccalaureate service for Wake Forest's commencement in 2019.
