= Lewis Nguyai Nganga =

Kenyan politician

Lewis Nguyai Ng'ang'a is a Kenyan politician. He belongs to the Party of National Unity and was elected to represent the Kikuyu Constituency in the National Assembly of Kenya since the 2007 Kenyan parliamentary election. He's a close ally of the former president Uhuru Kenyatta. In February 2021 he was appointed as the chairman of the National Hospital Insurance Fund (NHIF) Board. He was named Assistant Minister of Local Government in May 2009. He lost the seat in the 2013 Kenya's General election to TNA's George Muchai a labour Movement deputy leader in what was believed to be a hotly contested seat. He is the son of former area MP Amos Ng'ang'a who served between 1974 and 1980.
