= Gitombo =

Village in Kiambu county, Kenya

Gitombo is a village in Komothai, Githunguri Constituency, Kiambu county in Kenya. It has an estimated population of 1,500 people most of who are 30 years old and above.
