= Oshwal Academy =

School in Kenya

Oshwal Academy is a private, co-educational institution situated in Nairobi and Mombasa, Kenya, which is owned and managed by Oshwal Education and Relief Board (part of a community of Kenyan-Indians practising Jainism), which also owns four private schools and hostels in Nairobi, Kenya.

Its curriculum follows the National Curriculum for England General Certificate of Education (GCE), although it replaced the O Level system to IGCSE from the 2012/2013 academic year.

The original building was sold and the school relocated to the exclusive Nyali region of Mombasa in 2005.

== Facilities ==
The new 14-acre (57,000 m^{2}) campus includes:

- Kindergarten School
- Primary School
- Junior School
- Senior School
- 3 ICT laboratories
- 6 Science laboratories
- Cafeteria
- Administration block
- Library
- Staff room
- Book store
- 2 Art rooms
- Music room
- Band room
- Swimming pool, and
- Basketball field.

The campus has a multi-purpose hall (which caters for indoor games such as badminton, basketball, handball, table-tennis and volleyball. It can host assemblies, examinations and entertainment events. The campus also includes sporting facilities, as follows: 25-metre swimming pool and toddlers pool, Full-sized football pitch (also can be used for hockey and rugby), 400 metre track field, Tennis courts, Common rooms, and Gardens.

== Schools ==
The Kindergarten section in the school is a co-educational institution for children between the ages of 2 and 5. The section has a separate building, with a separate playing area.

Junior School caters for students between the ages of 6 and 11 which follows the English educational system of Key Stage.

Senior School is divided into an IGCSE section and an A Level section. Year 7 to 11 concentrate on the IGCSE examinations, after which students sit on their pre-university examinations during Year 12 and 13, modelled after the EnglishAdvanced Level system.

== Activities ==
Some of the clubs and activities available are: 'Music, dance and theatre', Expedition, Model United Nations, Student council, President’s Award Scheme, Art and Craft, Chess, First Aid, Girl Guides, Interact, Journalism, Public speaking and drama, Science, Scouting, Smart Cookies, Wildlife, Young Farmers, Book and Media club, Taekwondo, and London Academy of Music and Dramatic Art.
