= Sigona =

Sigona is an Italian surname, originally from Sicily. Notable people with the surname include:

- Carmelo Sigona (born 1968), American graffiti artist
- José Sigona Torres (born 1953), Mexican politician
- Nando Sigona (born 1975), Italian social scientist and academic
