= Hortense Lougué =

Hortense Lougué is a woman human rights defender and the Executive Director of the Association of Support and Awakening Pugsada (ADEP), a non-governmental organisation that focuses on improving the legal, and socio-economic status of women and girls in Burkina Faso. She works extensively with young girls and women who have been forced into marriage, are victims of gender violence or have suffered female genital mutilation. Having been a volunteer in the Pugsada association, she became the coordinator and chief executive when the founder took over international duties in 2008. Her drive to do this originated from her experience of inequality and injustice.

== Activism ==
ADEP works on gender-based violence, education and human rights and aims to combat gender-based violence and forced marriages. It was founded in 1995. This organisation works with women and young girls who have been forced into marriages or suffered female genital mutilation. It is based in the Ouagalese district of Kalghondin, not far from the center of the capital of Burkina Faso. ADEP works throughout Burkina Faso in schools, with local and traditional authorities and has opened a reception center for girls and women victims of violence such as early marriage and domestic violence. It consists of more than 15 people working across the country to defend the rights of girls.

Lougué has spearheaded many projects to advance education on these topics, providing awareness and information on how to tackle these issues. ADEP has training workshops on the concepts of gender equality and shared resource management to help students understand that equality is a chance for everyone.

“I have been an activist, general secretary, program coordinator and today I am an executive director of the Association of Support and Awakening Pugsada (ADEP), an NGO focused on improving the legal status and socio-economic living conditions of girls. I lead 10 projects and through determination and perseverance, we are committed to improving the lives of girls and women in Burkina Faso,” she says.

According to Amnesty International her committed advocacy efforts have also led to new laws addressing violence against women in Burkina Faso.

== Partnerships ==
In May 2016, Hortense Lougué featured in an exhibition entitled BURKINA FASO: On The Frontline Of The Struggle For Sexual Health And Rights In Burkina Faso, organised by Make Every Woman count. In November 2018, she participated in the World Forum for Democracy. ADEP also collaborated with Amnesty International on the My Body My Rights campaign. She has collaborated with Crossroad International in 2016 to increase capacity in the organisation.

== Context ==
In February 2016 the Burkina Faso government promised to increase the legal marriage age for girls to 18. This has not yet been implemented. During the 2013 Universal Periodic Review of Burkina Faso, the country accepted recommendations to end forced marriage. However, the country has the 7th highest rate of child marriage in the world. One in every two women in Burkina Faso will be married before the age of 18. Child marriage affects all aspects of a girl's life, including denying women the opportunity to make decisions about their well-being and sexual health. According to Plan International, child marriage leads to increased risk of violence, abuse and ill-health.
