= Aiducation =

Non-profit organization in the field of education

Aiducation International
- Type: Non-profit organization
- Industry: Education
- Founded: 2007
- Founder: Kristin Kapitza
- Headquarters: Kenya, Switzerland, Germany, UK, and United States
- Key people: Dr. Florian Kapitza (Co-founder), Matthias Meier, Dr. Kristin Kapitza (Co-founder), Dr. Hannes Röst, Dr. Kerstin Hockmann, Marc Blumenfeld, Jan Rihak, and Dr. Eva Koeberl (Co-founder)
- Website: http://www.aiducation.org

Aiducation International, founded in 2006, is an international "for impact" non-profit organization (NPO) in the field of education. Its focus is on Kenya and on the Philippines. Aiducation supports bright young people from low-income families through scholarships to higher education and accompanies them on their educational and career journeys, often more than ten years. Supported by individual donors, foundations and companies, Aiducation provides not only scholarships, but also mentoring, coaching, and entrepreneurship programmes through employee engagement and CSR initiatives.

== Need ==
While the Kenyan population has access to free-of-charge primary education, few families can afford secondary school education for their kids. Every year, this forces thousands of students to drop out of school. Consequently, talent, creativity, motivation and drive are lost – potential needed for the economic, social and political development of Kenya.

== Information ==
- Aiducation International has chapters on three continents.
- Aiducation International spends more than 90% of all scholarship donations directly on education.
- Aiducation International was founded in 2006. Today, Aiducation International is run by volunteers (called Aiducators) with chapters in Germany, Kenya, UK, USA, and Switzerland.

2006:

AI started as an NGO startup with roots in Kenya. In February 2006, members of the Kenyan civil society founded the organization- Pwani Education Welfare Association (PEWA), which soon became Aiducation International Kenya.

2007:

AI Schweiz was founded in September 2007. In the same month Aiducation was able to award the first two scholarships to poor but high performing students.

2008:

The first "Mentorship Academy" took place in Kenya. During the event, scholars meet to network, learn from guest speakers as well as from each other, and participate in workshops on how to make their country a better place.

2009:

Chapters were opened in Germany and Singapore. The indirect impact of the scholars of Aiducation International became visible for the first time as one of the scholars organized fundraising events against a famine in northern Kenya.

Since its inception, Aiducation has provided more than 2800 students with scholarships.

== Awards ==
- VentureKick award
- Reboot grant
- Procter & Gamble Alumni Grant to finance Mentorship Academies in 2010.

== Organization structure ==
Aiducation International (the umbrella organization) has national chapters in developed as well as developing countries. The chapters in developed countries are for the purpose of raising scholarships as opposed to those in developing countries which exist to provide scholarships to bright, underprivilleged students. The fundraising chapters (Switzerland, Germany, UK and the US) and talent-raising chapters (Kenya) have contact with scholars. The latter are responsible for the recruitment and pre-selection of students as well as mentoring of scholars.

== Merit-based scholarships ==
Aiducation International sources scholarships for bright and poor children to fund their secondary school education. Typically, these students are above-average performers and would have dropped out of school due to financial constraints. Donors can choose which student receives their scholarships from among Aiducation's pool of applications.

== In the news ==
Aiducation International has received media coverage:

- Finanz und Wirtschaft: 16 Oct 2026, "Kaffee mit Christina Reuther"
- World Finance: 2022, "Beyond Capital: Empowering 1000 Young Entrepreneurs"
- Roche: 02 May 2022, "Secondary School Scholarships with Aiducation in Kenya"
- Neue Zürcher Zeitung (NZZ): 19 Jun 2009, "Ein startup, das die Welt verändern will" (in German: in this article and the associated podcast two of the founders describe the young history of Aiducation International and about Aiducation's way of helping people help themselves)
- 20min: 19 Aug 2008, "Oberschulbildung für alle" (in German: the article is a general feature of the organization to the public)
- ilsole24ore: 15 Mar 2009, "Impegno nel no profit per Florian Kowalke" (in Italian: an article describing how one of the founders, Florian Kowalke, became a founder of Aiducation International)
- Neue Zürcher Zeitung (NZZ): 20 Oct 2009, "Ein Kick für eine gute Sache" (in German: the newspaper article is about one of the most important Swiss startup prizes that Aiducation won in 2009)
- Die Zeit: 19 Nov 2009, "Das können WIR tun" (in German: the article uses the organization to exemplify useful approaches in modern development aid)
