= Thika Town Constituency =

Kenyan electoral constituency

Thika Town
- constituency for the Parliament of Kenya
- Thika Town Constituency within Kiambu County

- Kiambu County within Kenya
- County: Kiambu
- Population: 339,040 (Note: Consolidated population figures for Thika East, Thika West and Thika Township sub-counties)
- Area: 217.9 km^{2} (84.1 sq mi)

Current constituency
- Created: 2012
- Number of members: 1
- Party: UDA
- Member of Parliament: Alice Wambui Ng'ang'a
- Created from: Juja
- Wards: 5

Thika Town is a constituency in Kenya. It is one of twelve constituencies in Kiambu County.

== History ==
The Thika Town constituency was established following the 2012 boundary delimitation in Kenya.

== Current Representative ==
The Member of Parliament for Thika Town has been the Honorable Patrick Kimani Wainaina Jungle and later Alice Wambui Ng'ang'a.
