= Kimani Ichung'wah =

Kenyan politician (born 1976)

Anthony Kĩmani Ichũng'wah

Majority Leader
- Incumbent
- Assumed office October 6, 2022
- Speaker: Moses Wetang'ula
- Preceded by: Amos Kimunya

Member of the Kenyan Parliament
- Incumbent
- Assumed office 2013
- Constituency: Kikuyu Constituency

Personal details
- Born: 6 April 1976 (age 50) Kiambu District, Central Province, Kenya
- Citizenship: Kenyan
- Party: United Democratic Alliance
- Spouse: Alice Nyokabi
- Education: University of Nairobi

Anthony Kĩmani Ichũng'wah (born 6 April 1976) is a Kenyan politician from the United Democratic Alliance. He is the majority leader in the National Assembly of the 13th Parliament of Kenya.

== Early life ==
Kìmani Ichūng'wah was born on 6 April 1978, in Gìkambura in Kiambu District of Central Province, Kenya. He grew up in a large family, being the second last-born among 13 siblings. His upbringing was deeply influenced by his father, who worked as a butcher. This familial connection to entrepreneurship would later shape Ichūng'wah's own career path and values.

== Education ==
He attended Kikuyu Township Primary School for his primary education and after completion, he joined Alliance Boys High. He was an undergraduate at Strathmore College (Certified Public Accounts(K)) and later earned a bachelor's degree in Economics at the University of Nairobi.

== Politics ==
Ichūng'wah was elected MP for Kikuyu Constituency in 2013, 2017 and 2022.

Ichūng'wah began his political career in 2013 when he was elected to the 11th Parliament as the Member of Parliament (MP) for Kikuyu Constituency under the National Alliance (TNA) Party ticket. His entry into politics was marked by a strong connection with his constituents. He made history in the 2017 general elections by becoming the first MP to be elected unopposed under Kenya's 2010 Constitution.

During his first term, Ichūng'wah served as the vice-chairman of the Public Investments Committee, and was a member of the Committee on Parliamentary Powers and Privileges, as well as the Departmental Committee on Agriculture, Livestock, and Co-operatives. He also represented Kenya in the International Visitor Leadership Program (IVLP), gaining valuable foreign policy experience.

In the 12th Parliament, Ichūng'wah chaired the Budget and Appropriations Committee until 2019, where he was lauded for his leadership and contributions to Kenya's budget-making process. He also served on the Committee on Appointments and the Committee on Members Services and Facilities.

=== Bills sponsored ===
His legislative work includes sponsoring bills some of which have been successfully passed into law. They include;

- The Alcoholic Drinks Control (Amendment) Bill, 2014
- The National Disaster Management Authority Bill, 2019
- The Land Laws Amendment Bill 2023
- The Digital Health Bill, 2023
- The Livestock Bill, 2024
- Conflict of Interest Bill 2023
- Public Finance (Amendment) Bill, 2019
- Affordable Housing Bill 2023
- Public Finance (Amendment) Bill, 2019

In 2022, Ichung'wah was re-elected for a third term and was appointed as the Leader of the Majority Party in the 13th Parliament.

== See also ==
- 11th Parliament of Kenya
- 12th Parliament of Kenya
- 13th Parliament of Kenya
