= Umma University =

Private university in Kenya

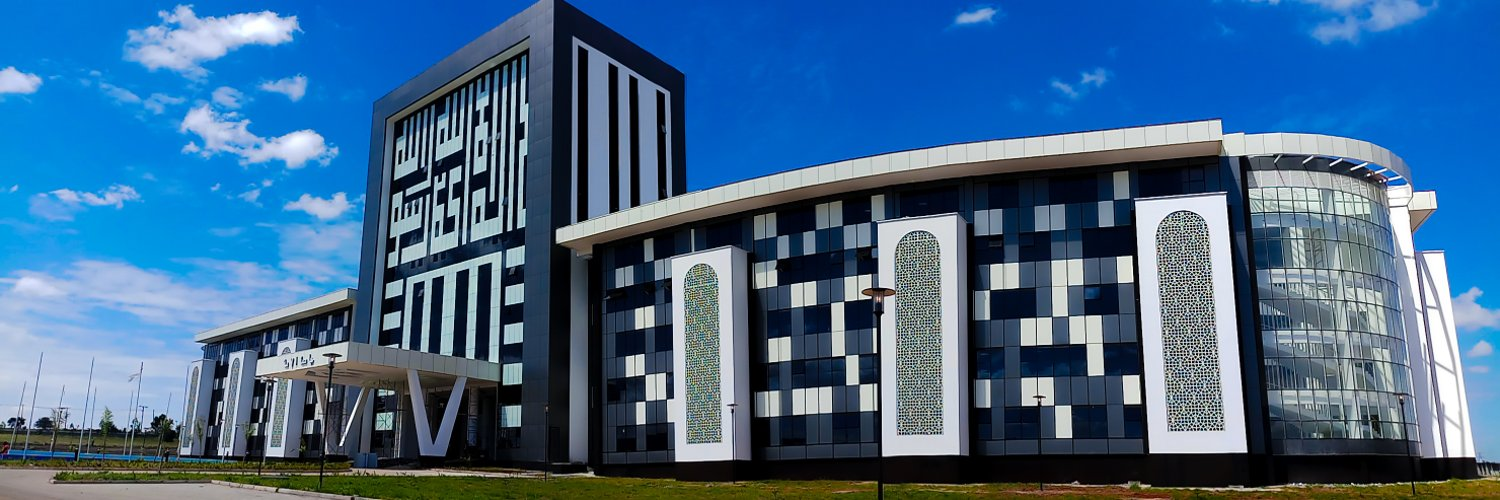
Umma University

Umma University is the first Islamic institution of higher education in Kenya, offering certificate, diploma, degree and postgraduate studies. Umma University was founded in 1997. The main campus is located in Kajiado County. Other branch is located in Thika-Makongeni off Garissa road.

Umma University is the brainchild of Africa Muslim Agency (currently known as Direct Aid International), a non-governmental organization which was founded by a Kuwait medical doctor, Abdulrahman Al-Sumait. It was founded in the year 1998 as Thika College for Sharia and Islamic Studies and was registered under Ministry of Education in the year 2001, and subsequently authorized to offer Diploma programmes in Islamic Sharia and Islamic Studies.

In 2007, Thika College for Sharia and Islamic Studies applied to the then Commission for Higher Education (currently known as Commission for University Education) for validation of its programmes in Islamic Sharia and Studies. The commission validated the programmes upon visitation and inspection of its facilities, in accordance with the Universities Rules 2004 and the Universities Act, Cap, 210B, Laws of Kenya. The programmes validation paved way for the college to apply to Commission for Higher Education for grant of authority to collaborate with the International University of Africa, Khartoum, Sudan to offer two degree programmes namely; Bachelors of Arts in Islamic Sharia and Bachelor of Arts in Islamic Studies. The running of the two degree programmes under the collaboration with the International University of Africa has been a good experience for the college. With the experience gained from offering the two programmes, the sponsor felt that it is the right time to establish a university.

The university was awarded Letter of Interim Authority in the year 2013. On 18 October 2019, President Uhuru Kenyatta awarded charter to Umma University after the institution met the ministry of education requirements. The university was also presented with the mace, logo, seal and two volumes of accreditation reports at a ceremony held in State House, Mombasa.

The university is fully established and has officially launched all its approved, quality and diverse programmes to contribute to national development. Currently the university offers additional courses in Computer Science, Business Management, Information Technology, Nursing and Islamic Banking and Finance. The university is also offering two postgraduate programmes namely Master of Business Administration and master's degree in Islamic studies. The institution is planning to roll out several postgraduate and undergraduate programmes in the near future.

== See also ==
- List of universities in Kenya
- Education in Kenya
