= Elizabeth Ibrahim Ekaru =

Kenyan human rights activist (1974–2022)

- Born: 1974; Isiolo County, Kenya
- Died: 3 January 2022 (aged 47–48); Kambi Garba, Isiolo, Kenya
- Cause of death: Stabbed
- Occupation: Human rights activist
- Organization: Maendeleo Ya Wanawake
- Children: 5

Elizabeth Ibrahim Ekaru (c. 1974–2022) was a Kenyan human rights activist. Known for her defence of women's rights, particularly indigenous women, in Isiolo County, Ekaru was murdered in 2022 following a land rights dispute.

== Personal life ==
Ekaru was from Isiolo County, Kenya, and lived in Isiolo at the time of her death. She was married with five children. In 2011, Ekaru's husband was murdered; as of 2021, his killers had not been apprehended.

== Activism ==
Ekaru grew up in a rural community where cattle rustling was common, causing conflict between different communities. Ekaru's own cattle were stolen in an attack that saw three herders killed; when Ekaru made a criminal complaint against the thieves, she was imprisoned by local police officers until a local human rights group successfully campaigned for her release. Ekaru went on to work as a peacemaker in Isiolo County through the Isiolo Peace and Resolution Committee, and advocated for the equal compensation of male and female victims of communal conflict in Isiolo and Garissa. In 1998, Ekaru became president of Turkana Dancer, a pacifist group that used dance as a tool for promoting change.

Ekaru became a noted advocate for the rights of women in Isiolo County, particularly indigenous women. In 2005, she was elected president of the feminist organisation Maendeleo Ya Wanawake, and was a member of the Defenders Coalition of Kenya's National Network of Women Human Rights Defenders. Ekaru advocated for girls' education and female empowerment through village savings and loans associations and self-help groups; she also supported women with HIV and victims of forced marriage. Ekaru challenged laws and traditions that forbade indigenous women from inheriting land, which was later enshrined in law in 2016, although this was not widely followed by many communities nor enforced by authorities. Her lands rights work also focused on the impact of climate change, promoting the cultivation of crops in areas impacted by drought.

In 2010, Ekaru represented Isiolo at the National Constitution Conference in Nairobi in which a new constitution was drafted.

== Murder and response ==
On 3 January 2022, Ekaru was stabbed to death at a funeral in Kambi Garba, Isiolo at the age of 48. She was reportedly stabbed five times in the chest, groin, back and hand by a neighbour with whom she was involved in a land rights dispute. The suspect was subsequently chased and apprehended by a mob, requiring his hospitalisation before he was transferred to Isiolo Police Station. On 25 January, the suspect plead not guilty; his trial started on 5 December 2022 at the High Court in Meru County.

On 12 January 2022, protests were held in at least six of Kenya's counties under the hashtag "#Justice4Elizabeth", demanding justice for Ekaru and other murdered Kenyan women. Petitions demanding a speedy investigation into Ikaru's murder was presented to the County Commissioners in Isiolo and Kisumu, as well as to the Supreme Court of Kenya and Harambee House, home of the President of Kenya, in Nairobi.

Front Line Defenders expressed concern at escalating attacks against women, and particularly activists, in Kenya. It expressed its condolences for her family and called on the Kenyan government to publicly condemn her murder. Peace Brigades International called on Kenyan authorities to "seek justice" for Ekaru and other murdered female activists. La Via Campesina condemned Ekaru's murder. The Women Human Rights Defenders Hub praised Ekaru for her efforts to protect rights enshrined in the Kenya constitution.

== Recognition ==
Ekaru received the Head of State Commendation Award for her human rights work in Kenya.
