= Presbyterian University of East Africa =

University in Kenya

The Presbyterian University of East Africa
- Motto: Finding New Paths
- Type: Private
- Established: 2007
- Affiliations: Commission of University Education
- Vice-Chancellor: Professor Wangari Mwai
- Faculty: 200
- Administrative staff: 50
- Students: 5000
- Undergraduates: 4000
- Postgraduates: 100
- Location: Kikuyu, Kenya
- Colors: Blue, Red and Green
- Website: puea.ac.ke

The Presbyterian University of East Africa (PUEA) is a chartered private university in Kenya. It is registered and accredited by the Commission for University Education (CUE). The University is located in Thogoto, Kikuyu, Kiambu county near Alliance High school and Alliance Girls High School approximately 20km from Nairobi CBD.

PUEA offers Certificate, Diploma, and Degree programmes in Computer Science, Theology, Business Administration, Education Health Sciences, Hotel and Tourism, Occupational Therapy, and Communication. It also offers two master's degrees: Master of Business Administration (MBA) and Master of Education in Educational Management.
