= Kiambu Constituency =

Electoral constituencies of Kenya

Kiambu
- constituency for the Parliament of Kenya
- Kiambu Constituency within Kiambu County

- Kiambu County within Kenya
- County: Kiambu
- Population: 145,903
- Area: 98 km^{2} (37.8 sq mi)

Current constituency
- Number of members: 1
- Party: UDA
- Member of Parliament: John Machua Waithaka
- Wards: 4

Kiambu is a constituency in Kenya. It is one of twelve constituencies in Kiambu County.
