= Willie Kimani =

Kenyan human rights lawyer

Willie Kimani Kinuthia
- Born: 21 April 1984
- Died: 23 June 2016 (aged 32)
- Burial place: Kabete, Kiambu
- Occupation: Human rights lawyer
- Employer: International Justice Mission
- Spouse: Hannah Wanjiku Gitwiria
- Children: 2
- Parents: Paul Kinuthia (father); Elizabeth Wambui (mother)

Willie Kimani Kinuthia (21 April 1984 – 23 June 2016) was a Kenyan human rights lawyer that was murdered in-line of duty in one of the most prolific cases on Police Brutality in Kenya. He worked with the International Justice Mission (IJM) in Nairobi and a board member of Right Promotion Protection and also a member of the Law Society of Kenya (LSK)

Before his killing, Willie had taken up a case against police officer Fredrick Leliman filed by his client Josephat Mwenda, a motorcycle 'bobaboda' operator. This followed an incident in April 2015, when Leliman allegedly shot Josephat Mwenda in the hand without provocation and subsequently charged him with several fabricated criminal offenses in an attempt to cover up the shooting. As a result of the harassment, Josephat filed a complaint with the Independent Police Oversight Authority (IPOA). In December 2015, he was again charged with six traffic offenses, including riding a motorcycle without a helmet. The International Justice Mission (IJM) took over the case in February 2016, assigning Willie to represent him.

== Extrajudicial execution ==
On 23 June 2016, Kimani alongside Josephat Mwenda, and their taxi driver, Joseph Muiruri, were abducted by four members of Kenya’s Administration Police and subsequently extrajudicially executed. Their abduction happened as they left the Mavoko Law Courts following a hearing.

On 1 July their bodies were recovered from Ol-Donyo Sabuk River with their arms tied behind their backs and with their bodies bearing signs of torture.

== Court case ==
Following a three-week investigation, four Administration Police officers — Fredrick Leliman, Stephen Cheburet, Silvia Wanjiku, and Leonard Mwangi — were charged on 18 July 2016 with three counts of murder for the disappearance and murder death of Kimani, Mwenda and Muiruri.

On 24 June 2021, his family called for the expedition of the murder trial, which was still ongoing, 5 years after his murder. On September 20, 2021, a Kenyan judge ruled that the four accused had a case to answer.

On 22 July 2022, three police officers; Fredrick Leliman, Stephen Cheburet, and Sylvia Wanjiku and police informer Peter Ngugi were found guilty of three counts of murder — of Kimani, his client Josephat Mwenda and driver Joseph Muiruri — officer Leonard Maina Mwangi was acquitted on all three counts of murder.

On 3 February 2023, the accused were sentenced as follows; Fredrick ole Leliman, the police officer believed to have been the mastermind of the brutal murder was sentenced to death, Stephen Cheburet Morogo was sentenced to 30 years and Sylvia Wanjiku Wanjohi was sentenced to 24 years. The informant, Peter Ngugi Kamau was sentenced to 20 years in prison. The ruling was made by Justice Jessie Lesiit.

== Personal life ==
Kimani's parents were Paul Kinuthia and Elizabeth Wambui. He was married to Hannah Wanjiku with whom he had two children.

== Awards and honours ==
In recognition of his work, Kimani was named 2016 Jurist of the Year and awarded the posthumous award for his bravery in defending the downtrodden in Kenya.

In 2017, Kimani was feted with the Fr. John Anthony Kaiser Human Rights Award by the Law Society of Kenya (LSK) for his fight for the rights of the downtrodden in society.

Rapper Julius Owino (Juliani) released a song, Machozi Ya Jana, that loosely translates to Yesterday's Tears. The song was in honour of the Late Willie Kimani and the other victims of extrajudicial killings.
