= Huawei ICT Academy =

Huawei university-enterprise cooperation project

- Website type: Educational program
- Available in: Multiple languages
- Area served: Worldwide
- Owner: Huawei Technologies Co., Ltd.
- Website: e.huawei.com/en/talent
- IPv6 support: Yes
- Commercial: Yes
- Registration: Required
- Launched: 2013; 13 years ago
- Current status: Online

Huawei ICT Academy is a global university-enterprise cooperation project led by Huawei. By the end of 2024, Huawei had partnered with more than 3,000 universities to build Huawei ICT Academies, which have collectively trained more than 1.3 million students.

== Structure and features ==
=== ICT Academy Support Center ===
The ICT Academy Support Center (IASC) is a partner certified and authorized by Huawei to assist in the development and operation of the Huawei ICT Academy.

=== Academy resources ===
Huawei ICT Academy provides courses, talent development, and certification standards for universities to help cultivate ICT professionals. The program includes the Huawei ICT Competition, which serves as an international competition and communication platform to foster learning and industry engagement.

=== Academy courses ===
Huawei ICT Academy had released over 80 courses in multiple languages, including Chinese, English, French, Arabic, Portuguese, Spanish, German, Russian, Korean, Indonesian, Japanese, and Turkish.

General courses: Introductory ICT topics covering AI, algorithm and program design, computer networks, data management, and analytics.

Professional and certification courses: More advanced, industry-aligned courses covering WLAN, 5G networks, data communication, AI applications, and IoT technologies.
