= Kiambu County =

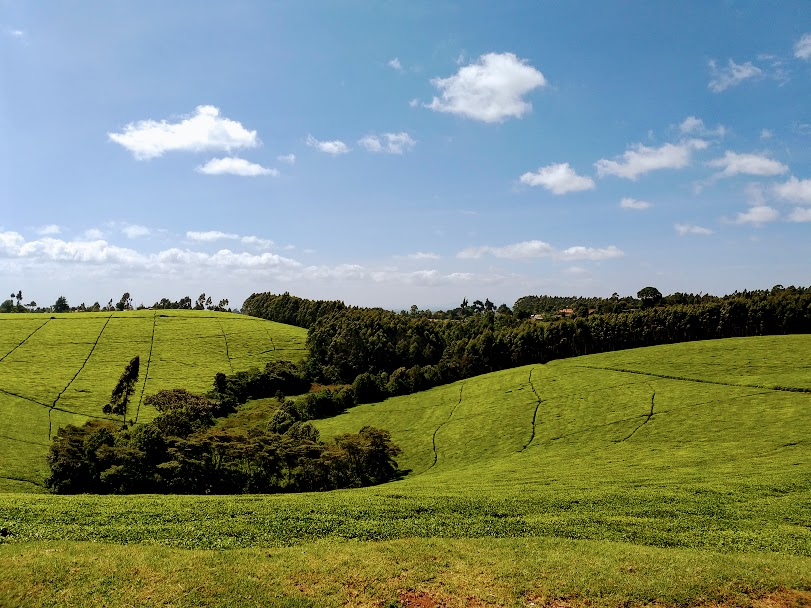
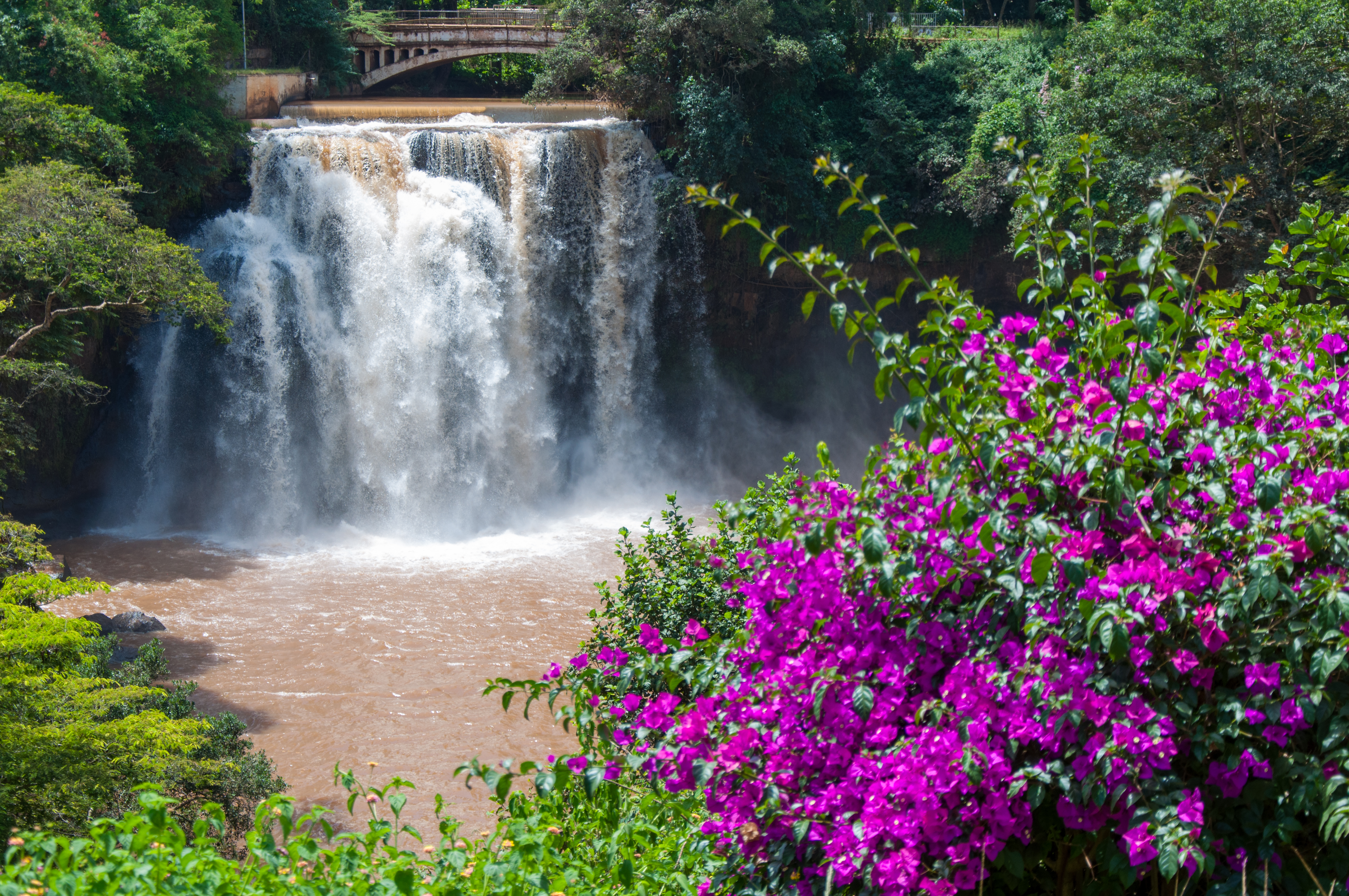
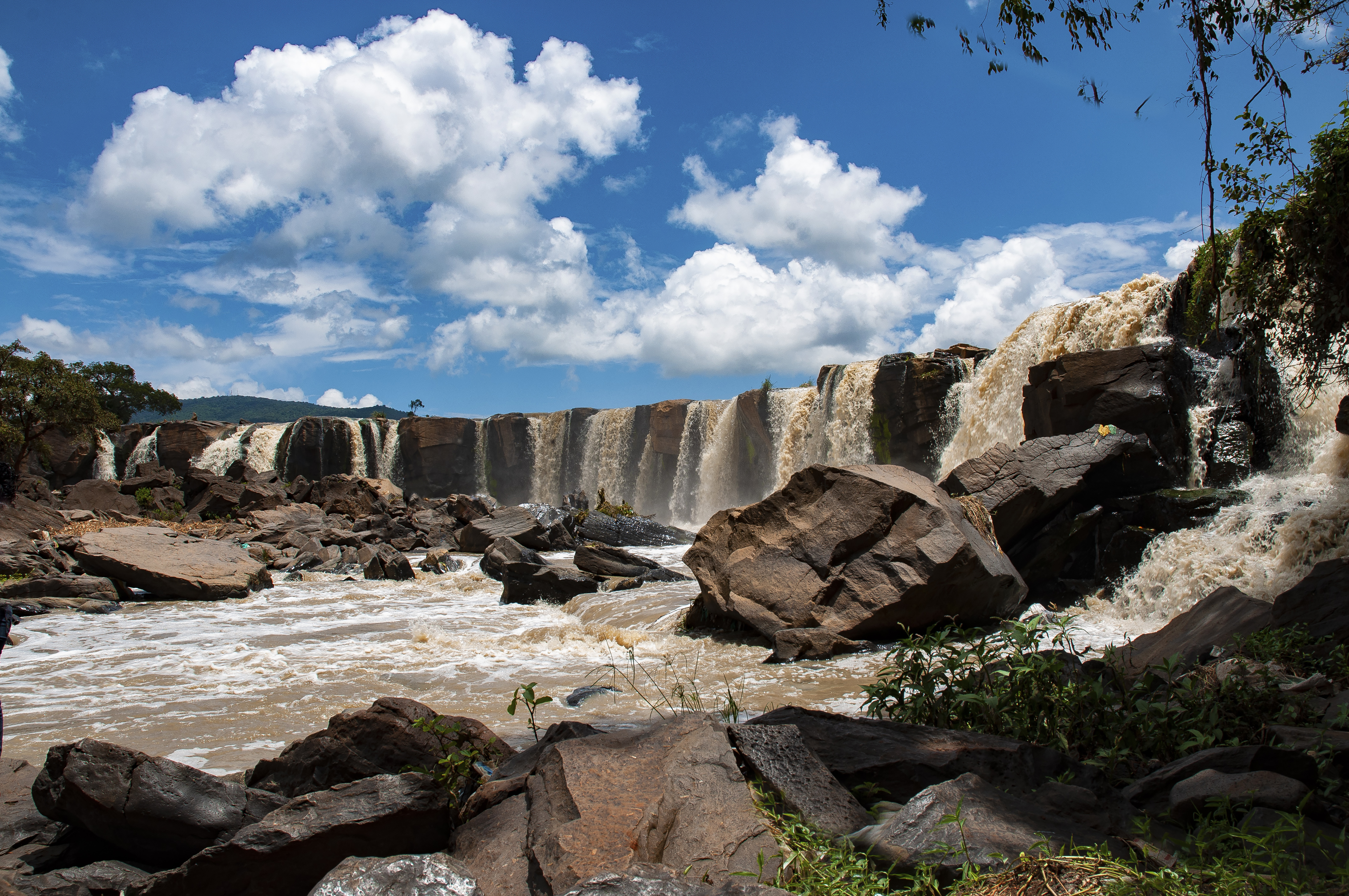
- From Top to left: Limuru Tea Estate, Chania Falls and Fourteen Falls

- Flag

- Location in Kenya
- Coordinates: 1°10′S 36°50′E
- Sovereign state: Kenya
- Region: Central Province
- Established: 4 March 2013 (by 2010 Constitution of Kenya)
- Preceded by: Central Province
- Capital: Kiambu
- Seat of Government: Thika Town
- Wards: 59

Government
  - Governor: Kimani Wamatangi
  - Judiciary: 12

Area
  - Total: 2,449.2 km^{2} (945.6 sq mi)

Population (2019 census)
  - Total: 2,417,735
  - Density: 987.15/km^{2} (2,556.7/sq mi)

GDP (PPP)
  - GDP: ▲$16.78 billion (2nd)(2022)
  - Per Capita: ▲$6,458 (2022) (7th)

GDP (NOMINAL)
  - GDP: ▲$6.164 billion (2022) (2nd)
  - Per Capita: ▲$2,369(2022) (7th)
- Time zone: UTC+3 (East Africa Time)
- Senator: Karungo Wa Thang'wa
- Woman Member of National Assembly: Ann Muratha
- County Assembly: County Assembly of Kiambu
- Speaker: Charles Murungaru Thiong'o.
- Website: www.kiambu.go.ke

Kiambu County is one of the 47 counties of Kenya located in the Mount Kenya region of Kenya. Its capital is Kiambu and its largest town is Thika. Kiambu County is the second most populous county in Kenya after Nairobi County. It is part of the Nairobi Metropolitan Area, The largest Metropolitan area in East Africa containing 15.95 Million people. Kiambu County borders Nairobi and Kajiado Counties to the South, Machakos to the East, Murang'a to the North and North East, Nyandarua to the North West, and Nakuru to the West. It has a population of 2,417,735.

The county is 40% rural and 60% urban owing to Nairobi's consistent growth Northwards. The Kikuyu are the dominant tribe in the county. Kiambu is also an economic and political powerhouse in Kenya due to its sprawling population and relatively urban and educated populace. The county features the second most universities only behind Nairobi.

== Climate ==
The county has an average annual rainfall of 1,200 millimetres (47 in) and a mean temperature of 26 °C (79 °F) with temperatures as low as −7 °C (19 °F) in the upper highland areas of Limuru. The long rains start in mid-March to May, and the cold season from July to August.

== Demographics ==
According to the 2019 census, there is a total population of 2,417,735 in the county: 1,187,146 males, 1,230,454 females, and 135 intersex persons. There are 796,241 households with an average household size of 3.0 persons per household and a population density of 952 people/km^{2}.

Distribution of Population by Sex and Sub-County
Sub-County	Male	Female	Intersex	Total
Gatundu North	54,189	55,678	3	109,870
Gatundu South	60,384	61,714	5	122,103
Githunguri	82,037	83,187	8	165,232
Juja	148,446	152,480	22	300,948
Kabete	97,794	101,845	14	199,653
Kiambaa	115,690	120,695	15	236,400
Kiambu	69,661	76,225	17	145,903
Kikuyu	90,919	96,198	5	187,122
Lari	67,061	68,238	4	135,303
Limuru	79,632	79,682		159,314
Ruiru	180,947	190,144	20	371,111
Thika East	19,688	19,264	4	38,956
Thika West	120,698	125,104	18	245,820
Total	1,187,146	1,230,454	135	2,417,735

=== Religion ===
Religion in Kiambu County

Religion (2019 Census)	Number
Catholicism	588,975
Protestant	882,779
Evangelical Churches	525,366
African instituted Churches	187,238
Orthodox	17,670
Other Cristian	120,492
Islam	21,311
Hindu	1,311
Traditionists	3,117
Other	119,515
No ReligionAtheists	30,770
Don't Know	3,854
Not Stated	436

== Administrative and political units ==
=== Political units ===
Politically, the county is divided into 12 constituencies, 60 county assembly wards, 97 locations and 257 sub-locations.

==== Electoral constituencies ====
- Gatundu North Constituency
- Gatundu South Constituency
- Githunguri Constituency
- Juja Constituency
- Kabete Constituency
- Kiambaa Constituency
- Kiambu Constituency
- Kikuyu Constituency
- Lari Constituency
- Limuru Constituency
- Ruiru Constituency
- Thika Town Constituency

=== Political leadership ===
Kimani Wa Matangi is the governor of Kiambu County following his election win on a UDA Ticket and successful swearing-in after the 2022 General election. He is deputised by H.E. Rosemary Kirika who hails from Gatundu-North subcounty.

Although the capital is Kiambu town, the Executive conducts business from Thika town. Due to its large Agikuyu dominated populace, Kiambu tends to deliver large votes during presidential elections. In the 2017 presidential election Uhuru Kenyatta, the Jubilee party frontrunner received 912,607 votes in the county, which is the most votes ever received from a single county in Kenya's election history, actually this accounted for nearly sixty percent of Kenyatta's margin of victory in the election. The current Kenya Kwanza government has its most members of Parliament from the county.

County Executive Committee
	Number
Governor	1
Deputy Governor	1
County Secretary	1
CEC Members	10
Total	13

=== Legislature ===
The legislature of Kiambu County is a unicameral County Assembly. It comprises 60 elected Members of County Assembly (MCA) from the 60 wards of the county and 27 nominated members. The members hold office for a five-year term each, renewable during the general election. The speaker and deputy speaker of the assembly are elected by the MCAs. The County Assembly is located at Kiambu town.

=== Judiciary ===
The Kiambu High Court was established on 20 June 2016. As of 2017, it consists of a one-judge bench. It is temporarily located at Thika waiting for a permanent building to be constructed at Kiambu, the capital.

=== County administration ===
The county has a county administrator who is appointed by the President of Kenya. He is not part of the county government but is a representative of the President to assist with matters of administration in the county with regards to the national government.

== Education ==
In Kiambu County, there are 1,515 ECD centers, 948 primary schools, 365 secondary schools, 33 youth polytechnics, 165 adult education centers, one technical training institution, one technical institute of technology. There are a number of universities: Kenyatta University, St Paul's University, Presbyterian University of East Africa, Mama Ngina University College, Jomo Kenyatta University of Agriculture & Technology and four private universities, Gretsa University, UMMA University, Mount Kenya University and Zetech University.

Education Institutions in Kiambu County 2014
Category	Public	Private	Total	Enrolment
ECD Centres	552	963	1515	99,061
Primary Schools	476	472	948	326,770
Secondary Schools	271	94	365	116,366
Youth Polytechnics	33	0	33	
Technical Training Institutes	1	0	1	
Adult Education Centres	165	0	165	6,128
Institutes of Technology	1	0	1	
Universities	1	4	5	

== Health ==
Kiambu County has a total of 505 health facilities: 108 are public, 64 faith-based, and 333 private. Kiambu County has 2,652 health personnel of different cadre with a doctor/population ratio of 1:6,667, while the nurse population ratio is at 1:1,110. The immunization coverage is at 89%, close to the national target of 90%.

According to 2016 estimates, HIV prevalence is at 5.6% (below the national 5.9%) and the county is ranked 6th in terms of HIV burden.

Health Facilities by Ownership
	Government	FBO	Private	TOTAL
Hospitals	89	11	100	251
Health centres	33 20	0	43	
Dispensaries	72	21	0	93
Clinics	0	0	147	147
Total	119	40	173	332

== Transport and communication ==
The county is covered by 2,049 kilometres (1,273 mi) of road networks. Of this, 459 kilometres (285 mi) is covered by earth surface, 1,075.8 kilometres (668.5 mi) is murram surface, and 515 kilometres (320 mi) is covered by bitumen.

There are 19 Post Offices.

== Trade and commerce ==
There are 302 trading centers, 118 markets, 364 retail supermarkets, 5,813 registered businesses, 5,807 licensed retail traders and 5,740 licensed wholesale traders.

Tatu City is a special economic zone and an industrial park located in Ruiru sub-county. Apart from real estate, individuals and organizations have also invested in processing. Companies operating in Kiambu include: Farmers Choice Ltd, 25 Kenchic Co. Ltd, Brookside Dairies, Githunguri Dairies, Ndumberi Dairies, Limuru Milk and Palmside Dairies. Kiambu has the second largest economy in Kenya, largely due to its sprawling population and close proximity to the capital city. Kiambu also has the second most educated populace of any county in Kenya.

Thika sub-county which hosts Thika Town (also known as Birmingham of Kenya, due to the many industries) has 58 industries, including Bidco Oil Industries, Devki Steel Mills, Broadway Bakeries and Kenblest, among others.

== Environment ==
Around 16% of Kiambu County, 40,000 hectares, is covered by forest. The trees are used for wood fuel as there is a high demand for both charcoal and firewood. Tree planting projects are in progress as the trees face increasing temperatures due to climate change.

In 2021 a leading activist, Joannah Stutchbury was assassinated after protesting about developments in the forest.

== Constituencies and sub-counties ==
The county has twelve constituencies and fourteen sub-counties. Of the twelve constituencies, Lari occupies the largest land mass at 439.2 km^{2} (169.6 sq mi), while Kabete is the smallest by landmass as it occupies 60.3 km^{2} (23.3 sq mi).

Kiambu County area: Constituencies size by land-mass
Constituency	Area (km^{2})	No. of Wards	Electoral Wards
Lari	439.2	5	Kinale Ward, Kijabe Ward, Nyanduma Ward, Kamburu Ward, Lari/Kirenga Ward
Juja	326.6	5	Murera Ward, Theta Ward, Juja Ward, Witeithie Ward, Kalimoni Ward
Ruiru	291.9	8	Gitothua Ward, Biashara Ward, Gatongora Ward, Kahawa/Sukari Ward, Kahawa Wendani Ward, Kiuu Ward, Mwiki Ward, Mwihoko Ward
Gatundu North	286.0	4	Gituamba Ward, Githobokoni Ward, Chania Ward, Mang'u Ward
Limuru	281.7	5	Bibirioni Ward, Limuru Central Ward, Ndeiya Ward, Limuru East Ward, Ngecha Tigoni Ward
Kikuyu	236.1	5	Karai Ward, Nachu Ward, Sigona Ward, Kikuyu Ward, Kinoo Ward
Thika Town	217.5	5	Township Ward, Kamenu Ward, Hospital Ward, Gatuanyaga Ward
Gatundu South	192.4	4	Kiamwangi Ward, Kiganjo Ward, Ndarugo Ward, Ngenda Ward
Kiambu	189.1	4	Ting'ang'a Ward, Ndumberi Ward, Riabai Ward, Township Ward
Githunguri	173.5	5	Githunguri Ward, Githiga Ward, Ikinu Ward, Ngewa Ward, Komothai 3 Ward
Kiambaa	83.2	5	Cianda Ward, Karuri Ward, Ndenderu Ward, Muchatha Ward, Kihara Ward
Kabete	60.3	5	Gitaru Ward, Muguga Ward, Nyathuna Ward, Kabete Ward, Uthiru Ward
Total	2,777.5	59	59

=== Sub-counties ===
Sub-counties are mostly derived from constituency boundaries but two constituencies, Gatundu and Thika, have two sub-counties each.

- Gatundu North Sub-county
- Gatundu South Sub-county
- Githunguri Sub-county
- Githurai Sub-county
- Kabete Sub-county
- Kiambaa Sub-county
- Kiambu Sub-county
- Kikuyu Sub-county
- Juja Sub-county
- Lari Sub-county
- Limuru Sub-county
- Ruiru Sub-county
- Thika East Sub-county
- Thika West Sub-county

== Population ==
Historical populations
Year	Population	Variation
1979	686,290	–
1989	914,412	+33.2%
1999	1,389,723	+52.0%
2009	1,623,282	+16.8%
2019	2,417,735	+48.9%

== Nairobi Metro ==
Part of southern areas of Kiambu County are within Greater Nairobi, which consists of four out of 47 counties in Kenya.

== Stats ==
=== Nairobi Metropolitan ===
==== Urbanisation ====
Urbanisation in Nairobi Metro
County	Urbanisation in Nairobi Metro (Per cent)
Nairobi County	100
Kiambu County	60.8
Machakos County	52
Kajiado County	41.4
Kenya Average	32.3
Urbanisation by County within Nairobi Metro

Source: OpenDataKenya

==== Wealth/Poverty Level ====
Wealth/Poverty Level in Nairobi Metro
County	Poverty Level in Nairobi Metro (Per cent)
Kajiado County	11.6
Kiambu County	98.8
Nairobi County	22
Machakos County	59.6
Kenya Average	45.9
Poverty level by County

Source: OpenDataKenya Worldbank

=== Central Kenya Region ===
==== Urbanisation ====
Urbanisation in Central Kenya
County	Urbanisation in Central Kenya (Per cent)
Kiambu County	60.8
Nyeri County	24.5
Nyandarua County	18.5
Muranga County	16.3
Kirinyaga County	15.8
Kenya Average	32.3
Urbanisation by County in Central Kenya

Source: OpenDataKenya

==== Wealth/poverty level ====
Wealth/Poverty Level in Central Kenya
County	Poverty Level in Central Kenya (Per cent)
Kirinyaga County	25.2
Muranga County	28.5
Kiambu County	28.9
Nyeri County	32.7
Nyandarua County	46.6
Kenya Average	45.9
Poverty level by County

Source: OpenDataKenya Worldbank

== See also ==
- Gitombo
- Kabete
- Kijabe
- Kiratina
- Wilfred Kiboro
- Nakuru County
- Meru County
- Nairobi County
- Kajiado County
- Machakos County
- Muranga County
- Nyandarua County
