= Koinange =

Koinange can refer to:

- Charles Karuga Koinange, colonial and post-colonial African official in Kenya
- Jeff Koinange, CNN reporter on African assignments
- Koinange Street, a major street in Nairobi, Kenya
- Koinange wa Mbiyu, prominent African chief and political leader during Kenya's colonial period
- (Peter) Mbiyu Koinange, former Kenyan Foreign Minister
