= List of gay, lesbian or bisexual people: Bi–Bz =

This is a partial list of notable people who were or are gay men, lesbian or bisexual.

The historical concept and definition of sexual orientation varies and has changed greatly over time; for example the general term "gay" wasn't used to describe sexual orientation until the mid 20th century. A number of different classification schemes have been used to describe sexual orientation since the mid-19th century, and scholars have often defined the term "sexual orientation" in divergent ways. Indeed, several studies have found that much of the research about sexual orientation has failed to define the term at all, making it difficult to reconcile the results of different studies. However, most definitions include a psychological component (such as the direction of an individual's erotic desire) and/or a behavioural component (which focuses on the sex of the individual's sexual partner/s). Some prefer to simply follow an individual's self-definition or identity.

The high prevalence of people from the West on this list may be due to societal attitudes towards homosexuality. The Pew Research Center's 2013 Global Attitudes Survey found that there is "greater acceptance in more secular and affluent countries," with "publics in 39 countries [having] broad acceptance of homosexuality in North America, the European Union, and much of Latin America, but equally widespread rejection in predominantly Muslim nations and in Africa, as well as in parts of Asia and in Russia. Opinion about the acceptability of homosexuality is divided in Israel, Poland and Bolivia." As of 2013, Americans are divided – a majority (60 percent) believes homosexuality should be accepted, while 33 percent disagree.

== Bi–Bz ==
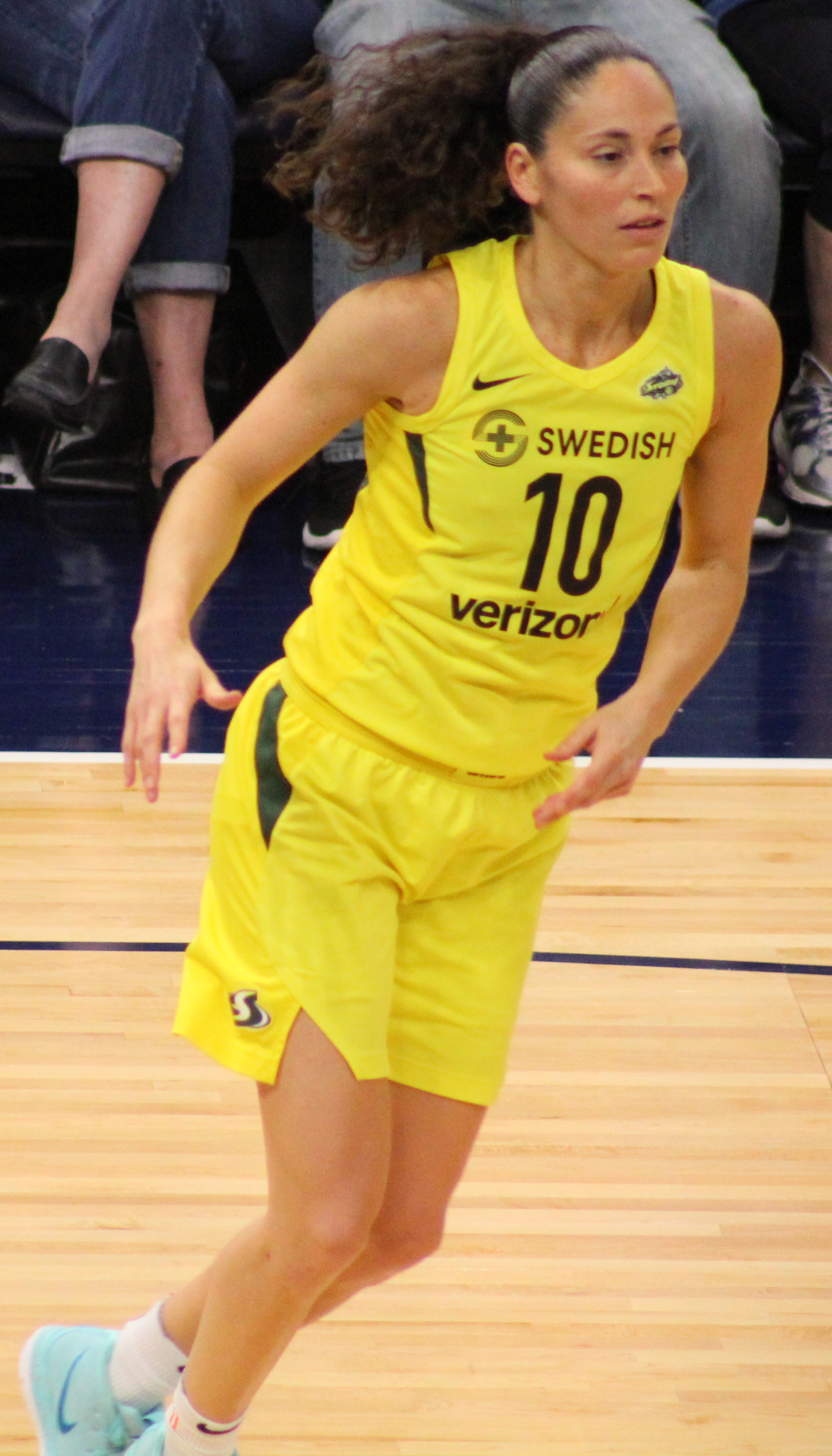
Basketball player Sue Bird

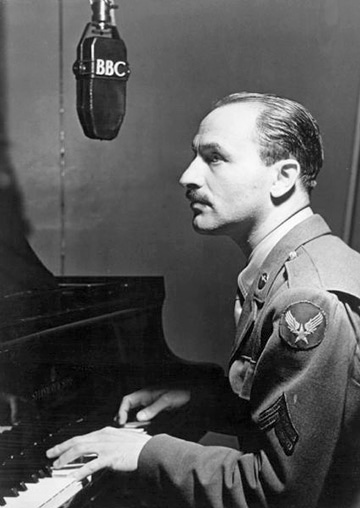
Composer, lyricist and librettist Marc Blitzstein

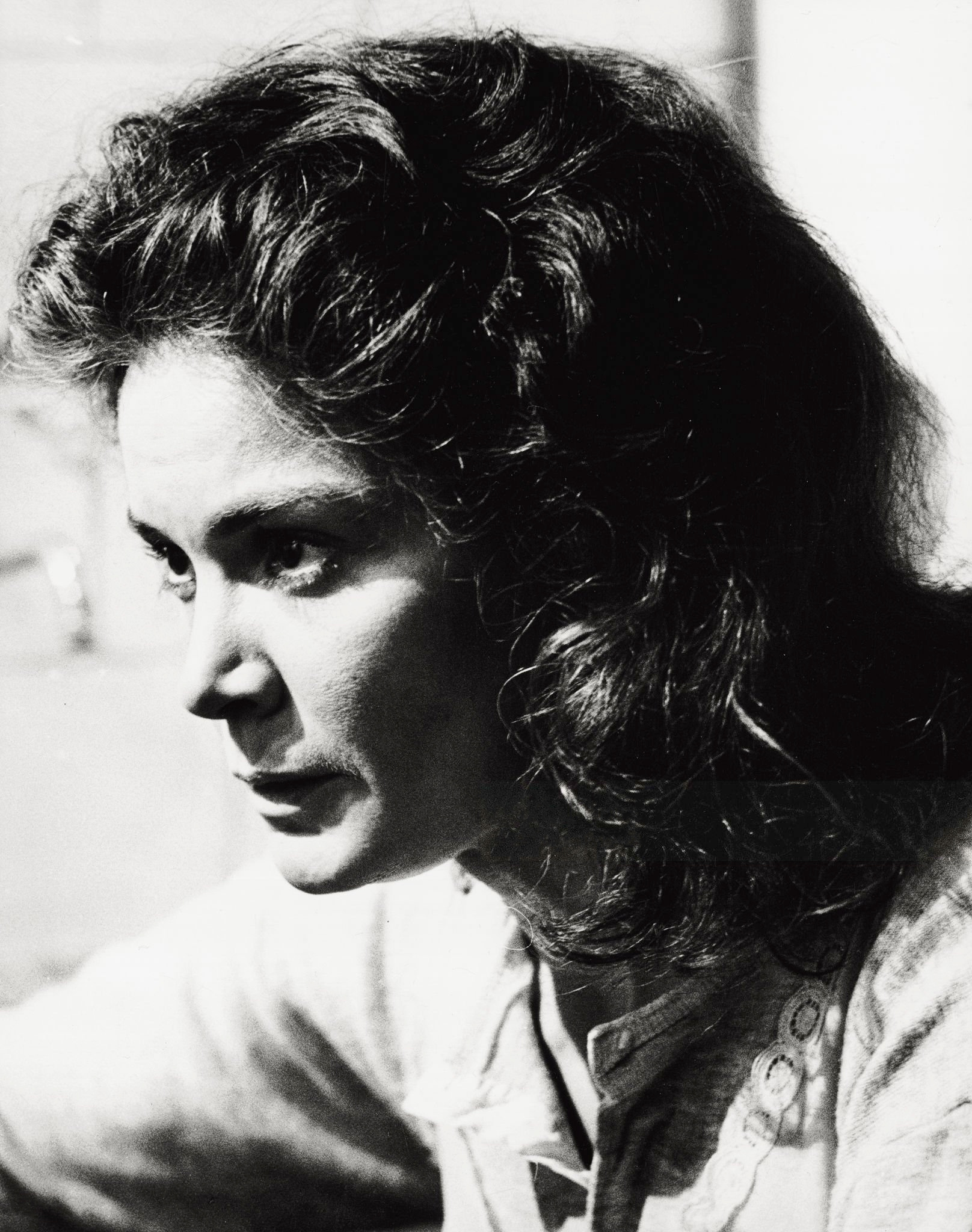
Actress Florinda Bolkan

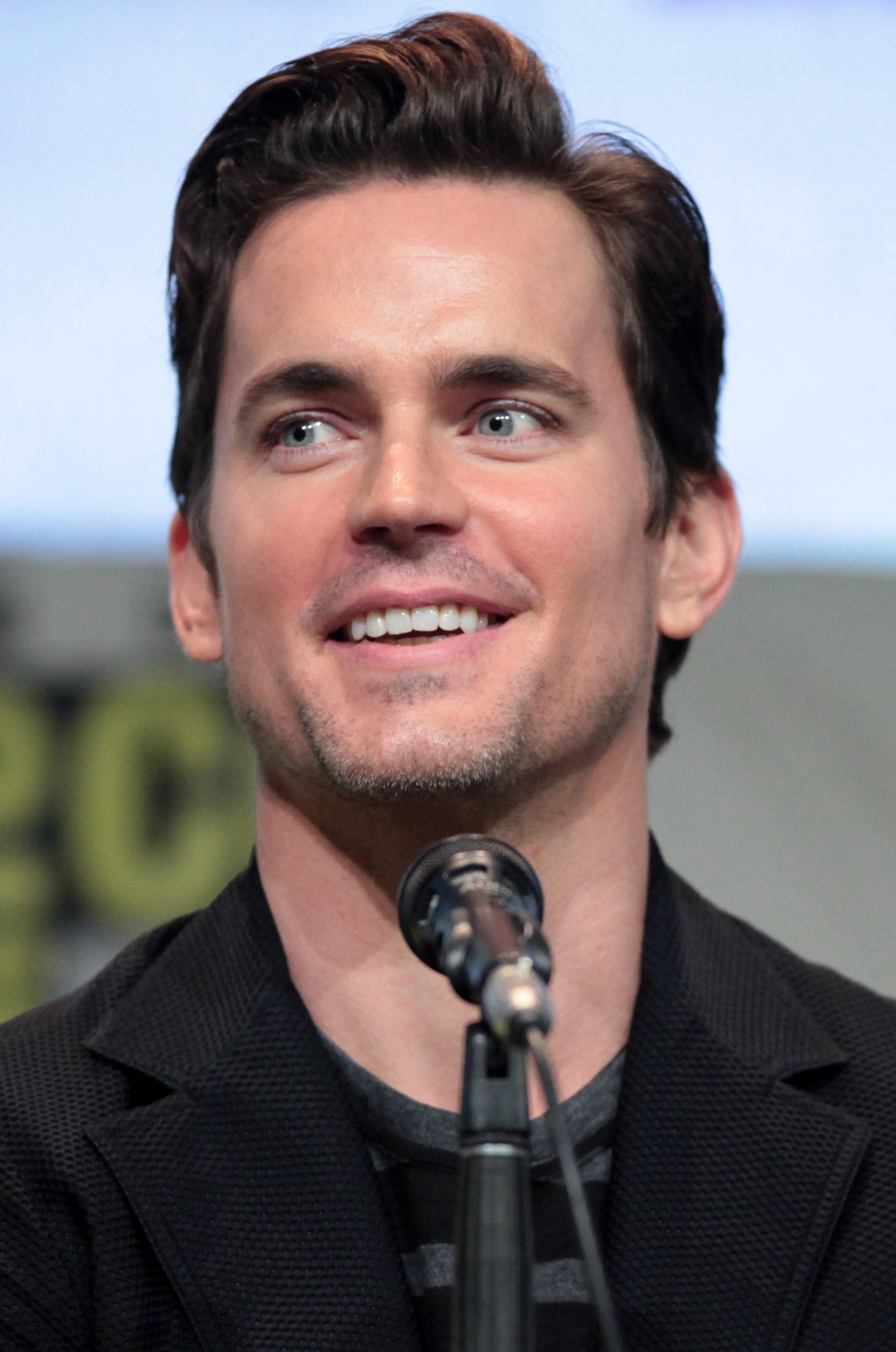
Actor Matt Bomer

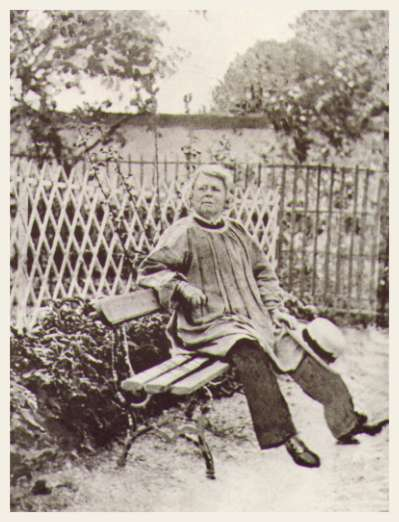
Artist Rosa Bonheur

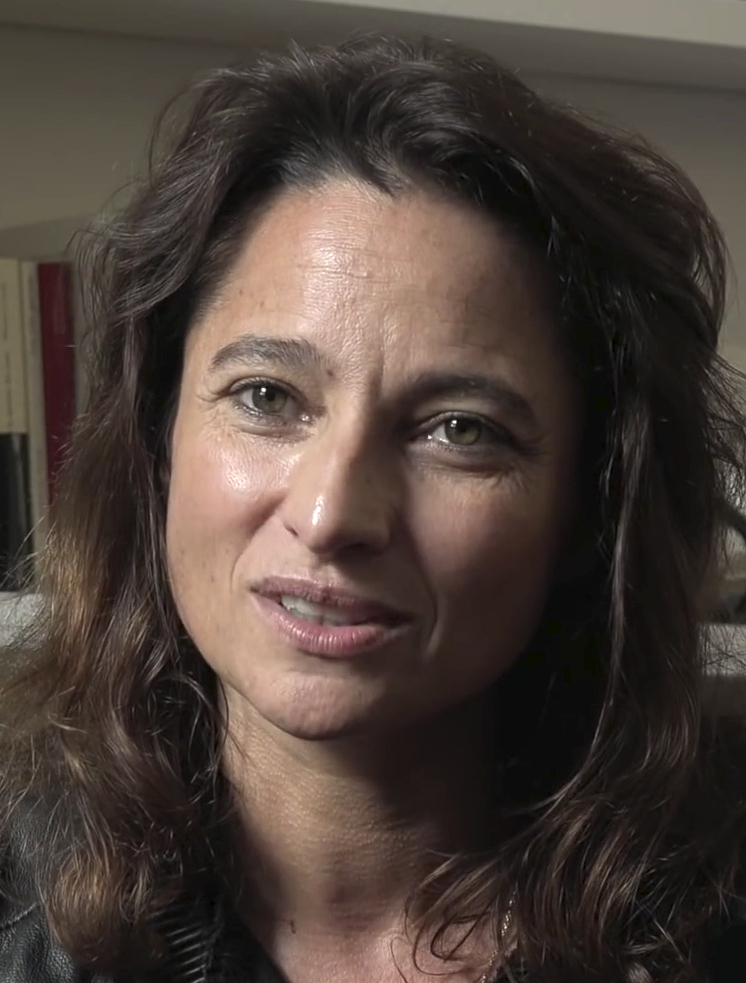
Author Nina Bouraoui

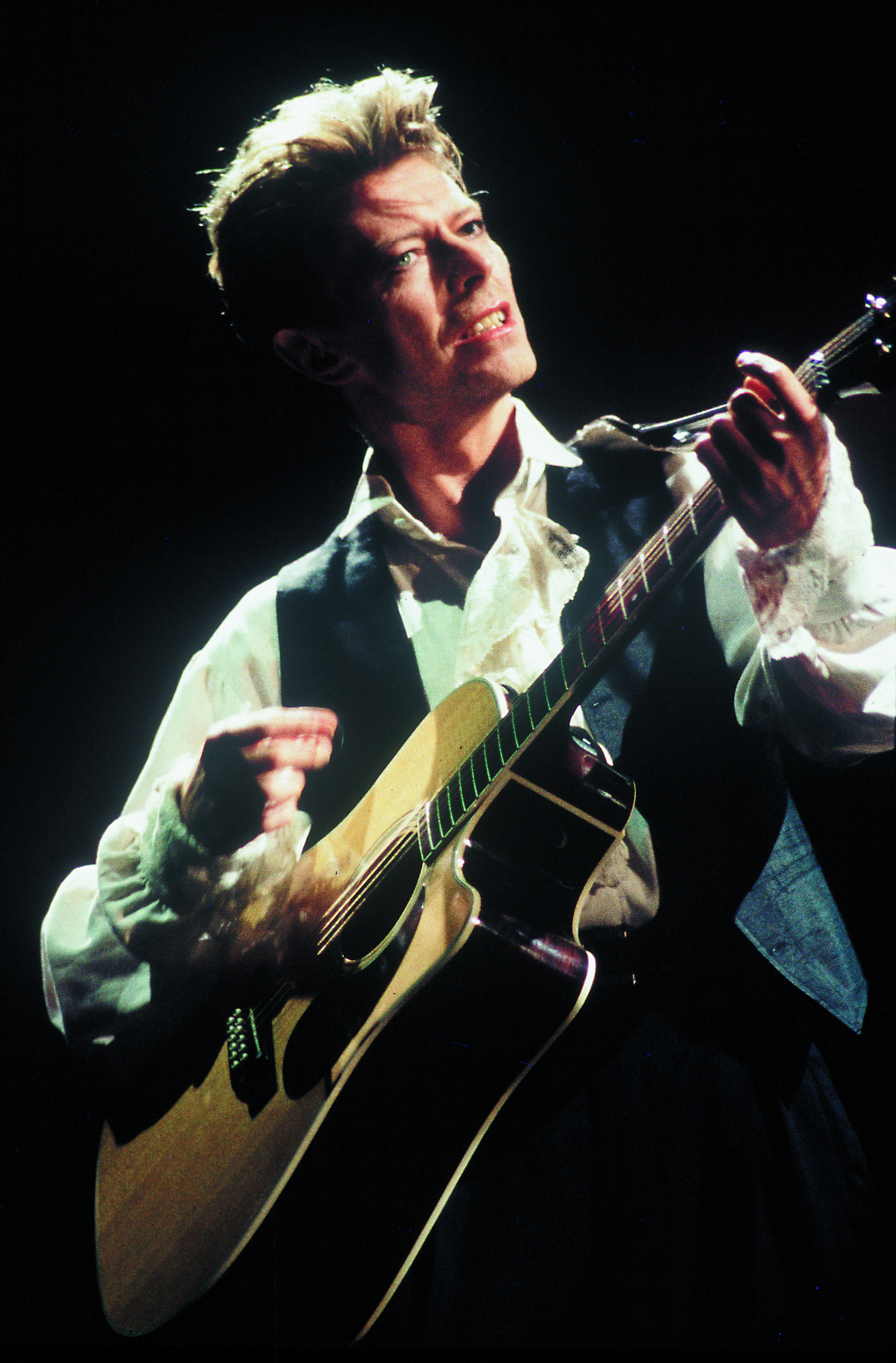
Singer David Bowie

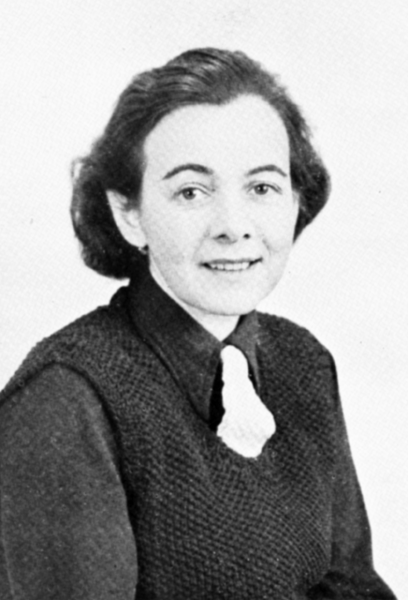
Poet Karin Boye

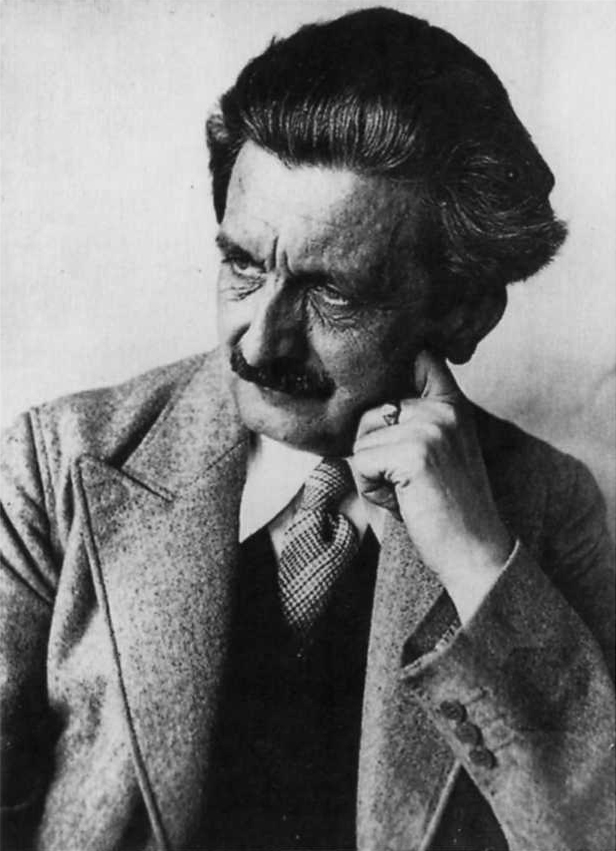
Writer, anarchist and activist Adolf Brand

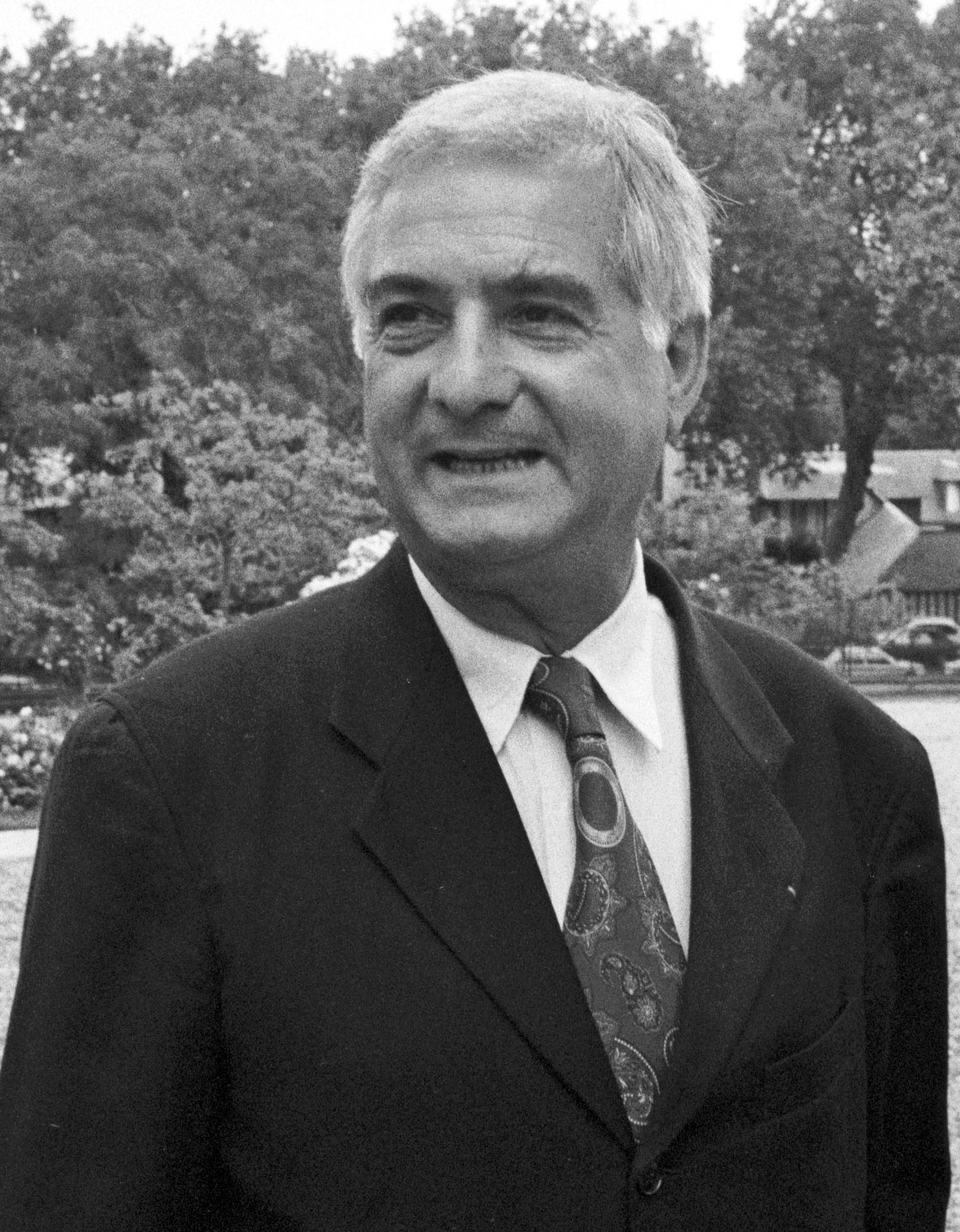
Actor Jean-Claude Brialy

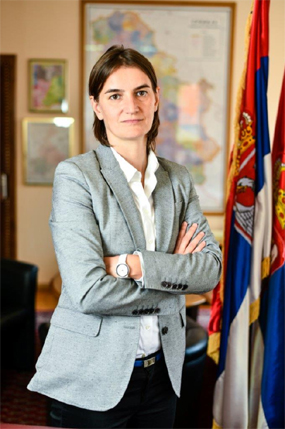
First woman and first lesbian Prime Minister of Serbia Ana Brnabić

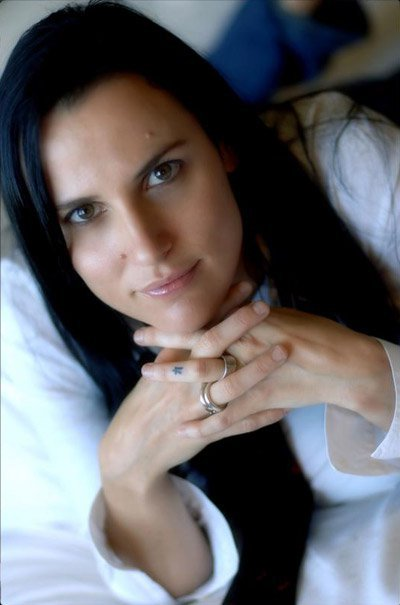
Filmmaker Katherine Brooks

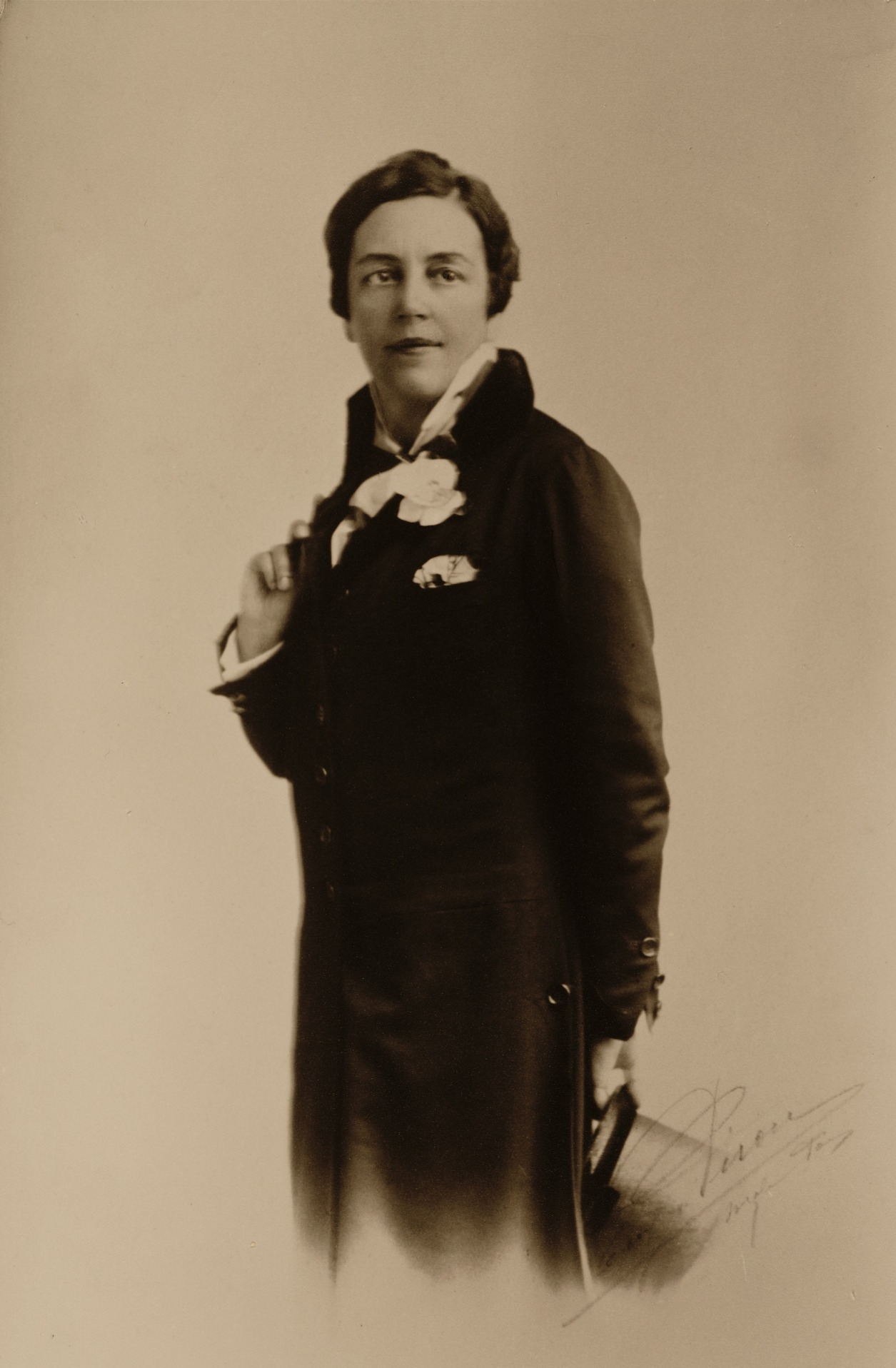
Painter Romaine Brooks

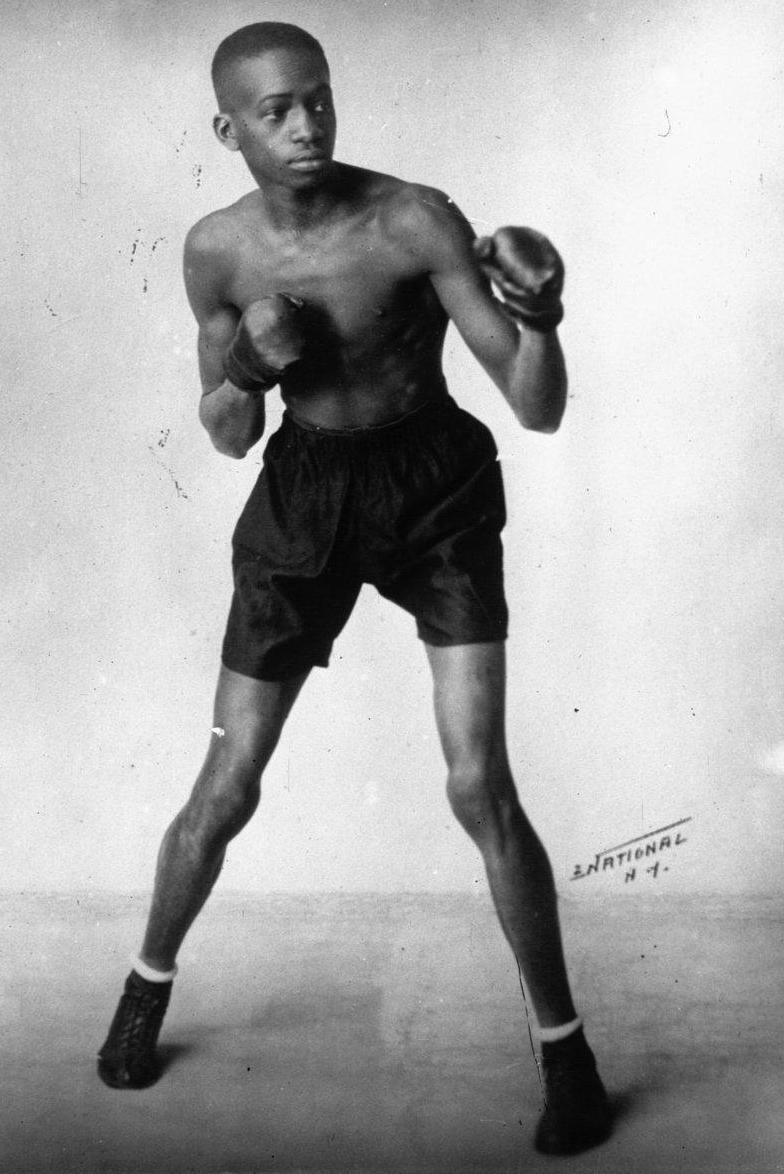
Boxer Panama Al Brown

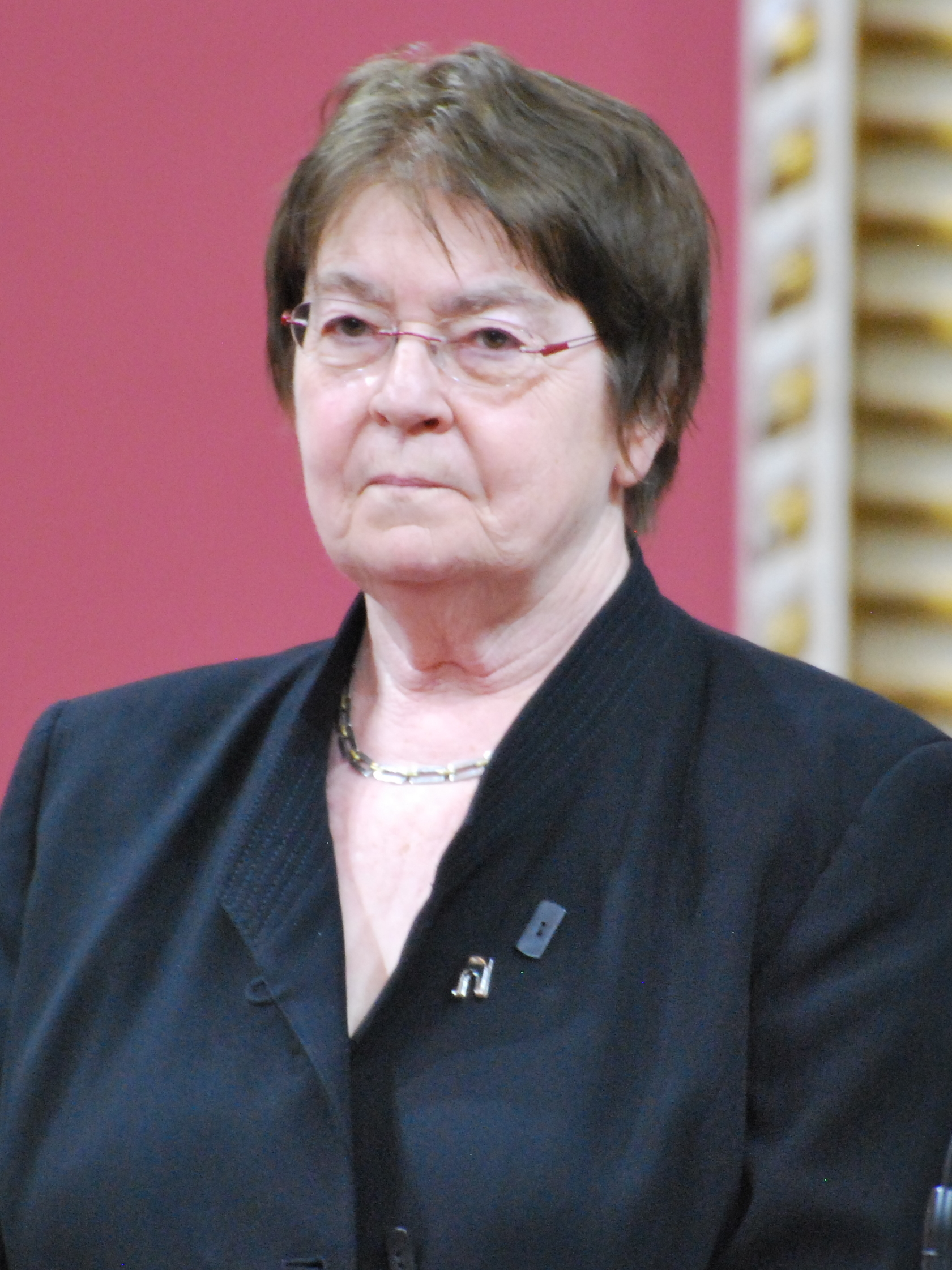
Poet and novelist Nicole Brossard

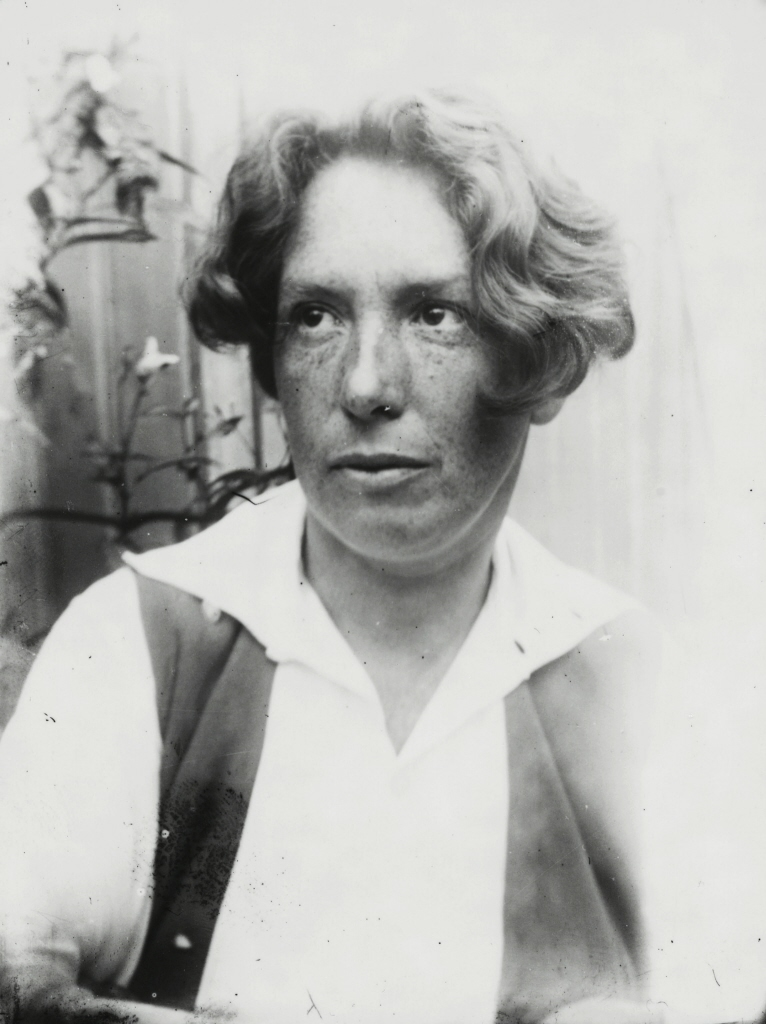
Poet, linguist and translator Til Brugman

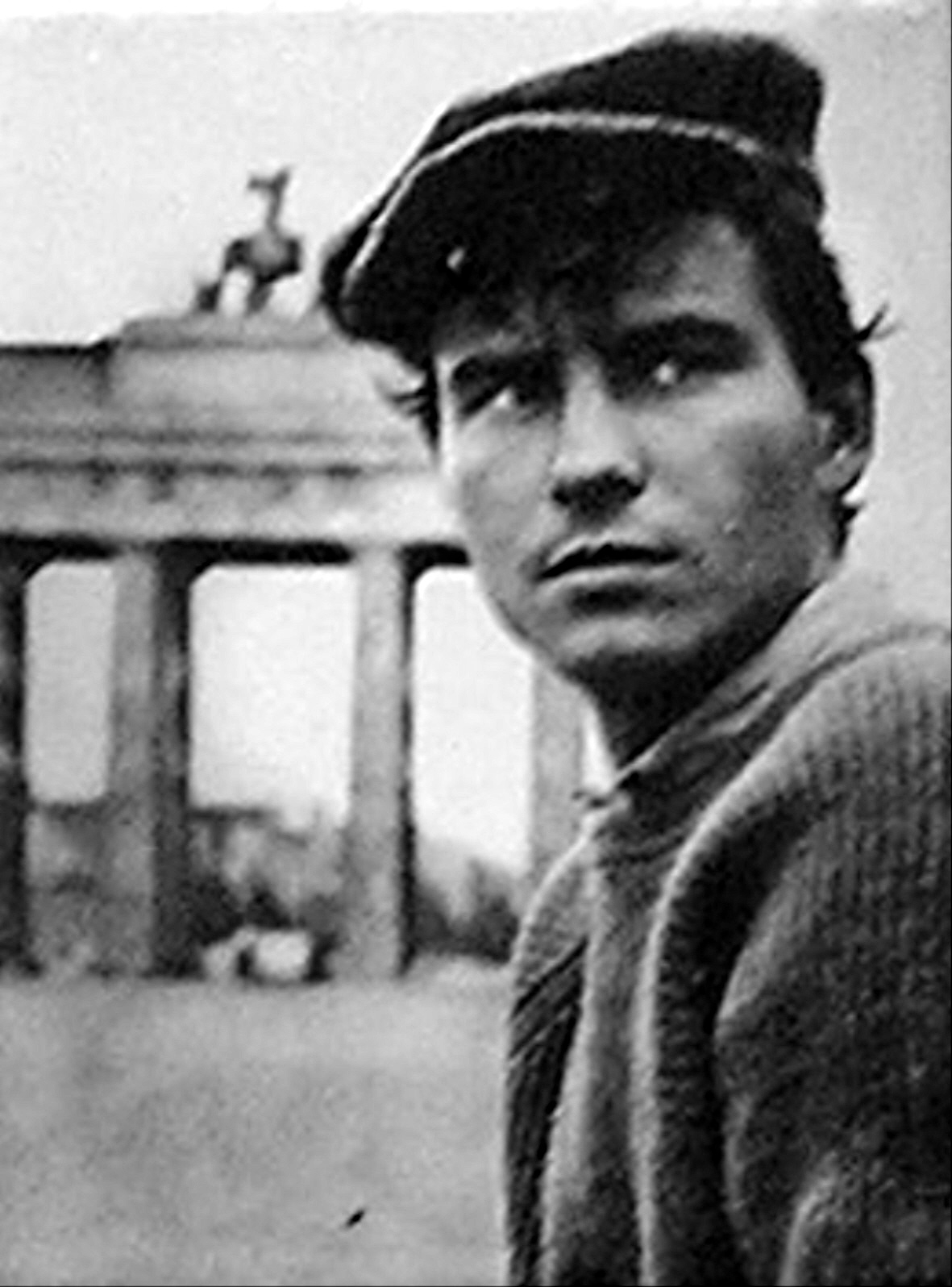
Actor Horst Buchholz

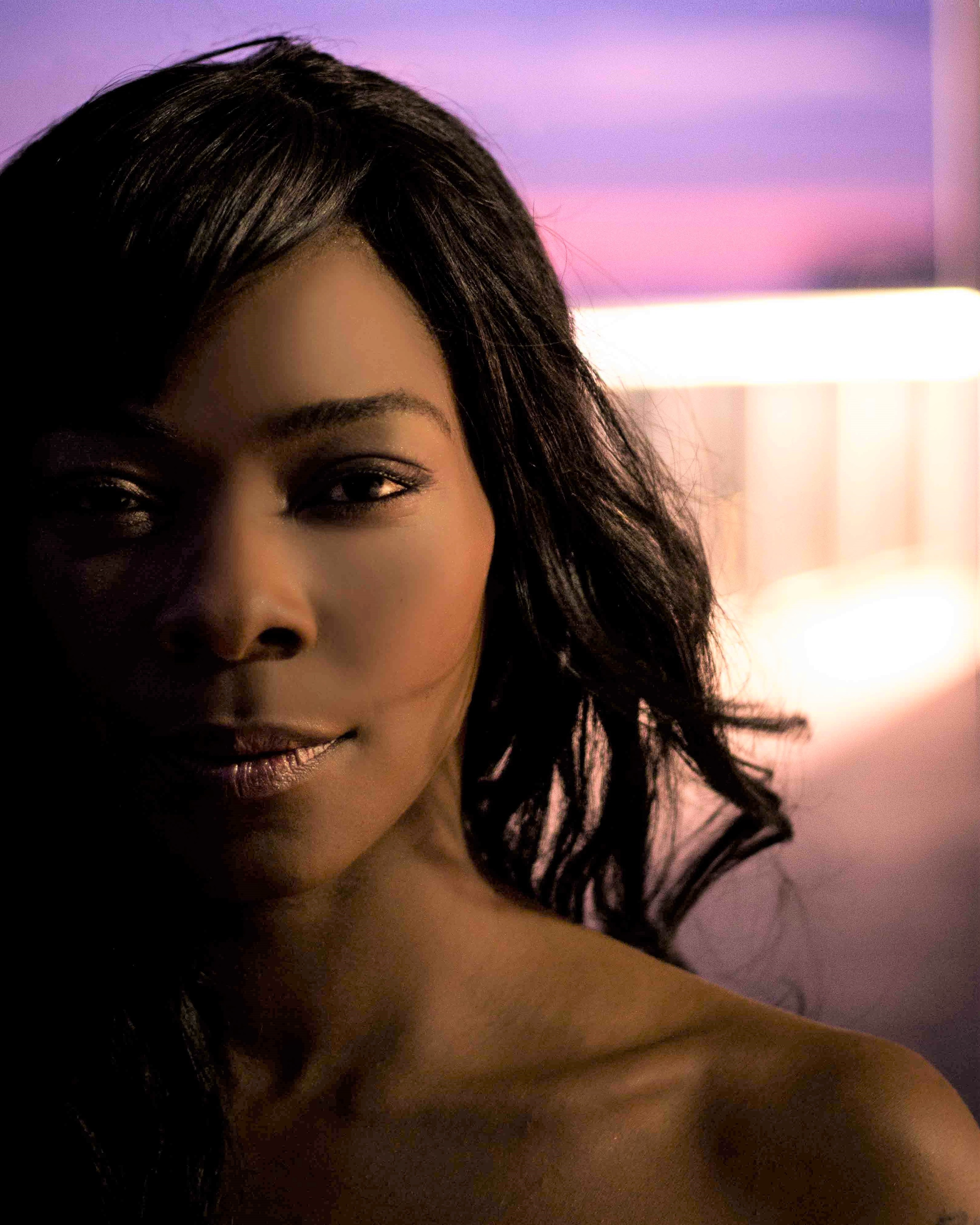
Singer Concha Buika

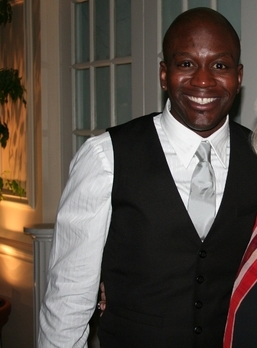
Actor and singer Tituss Burgess

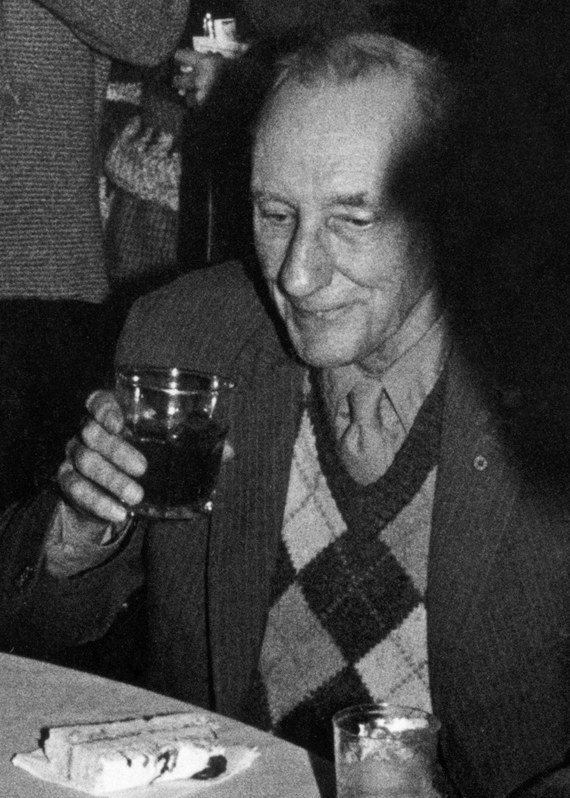
Writer and visual artist William S. Burroughs

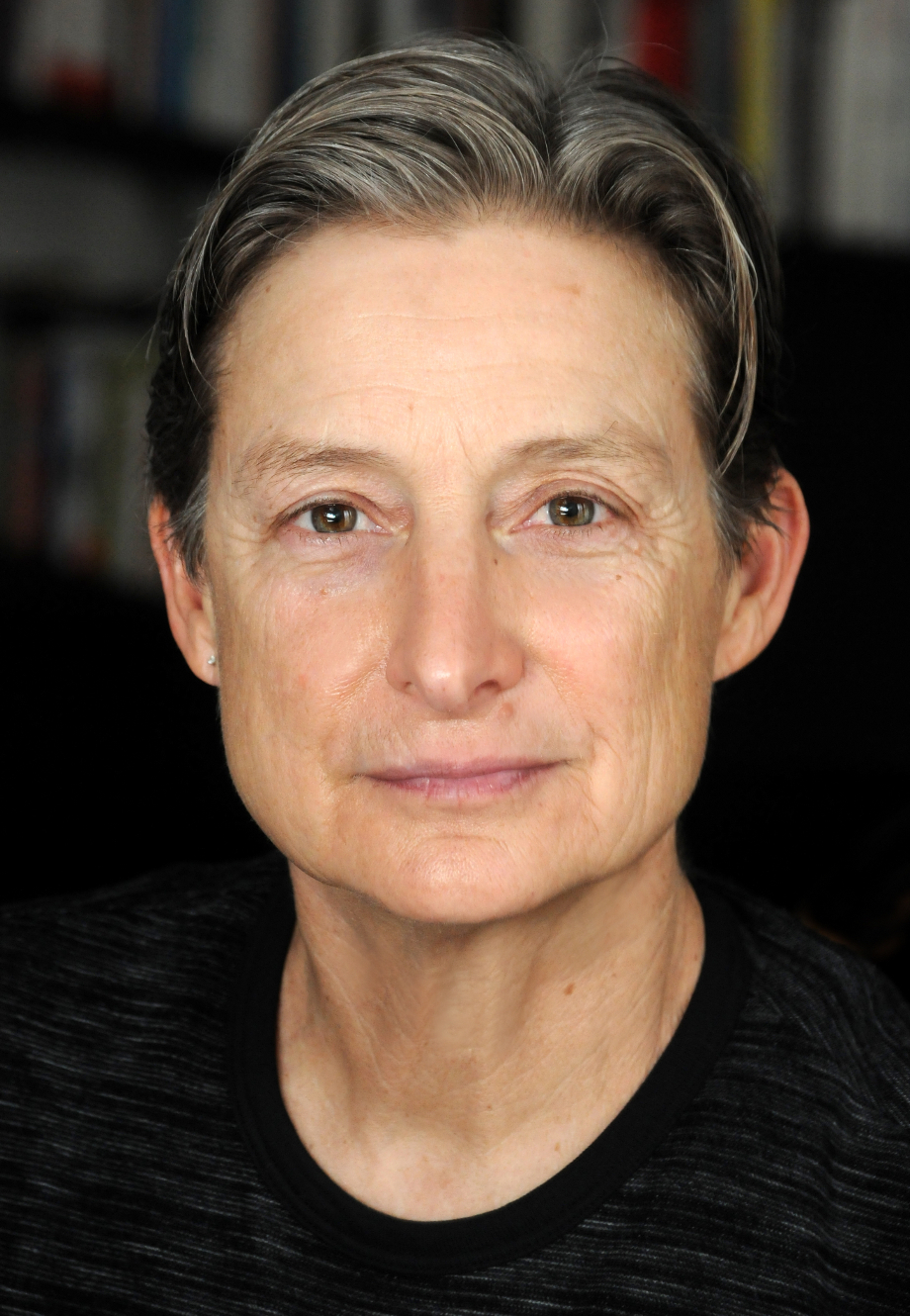
Philosopher Judith Butler

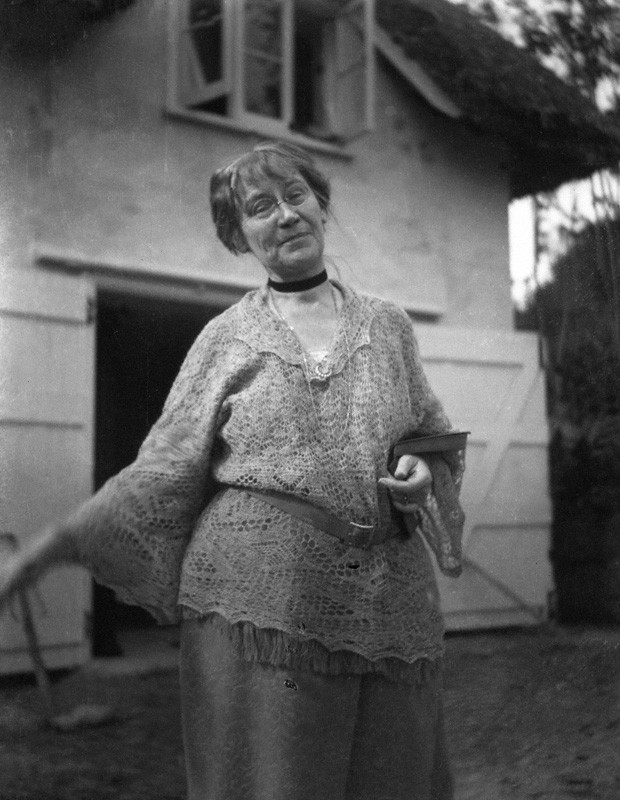
Novelist and translator Dorothy Bussy

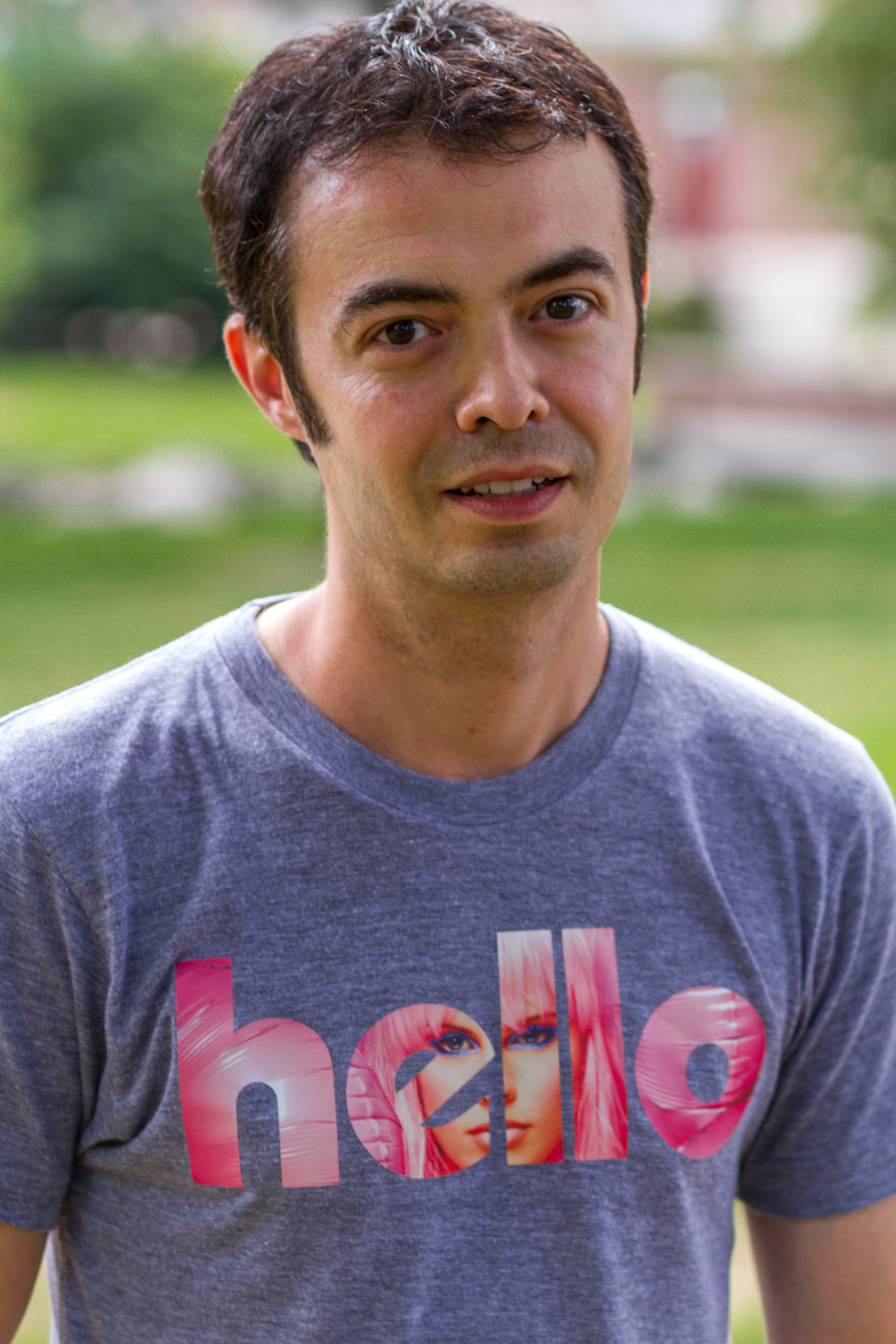
Computer scientist and software engineer Orkut Büyükkökten

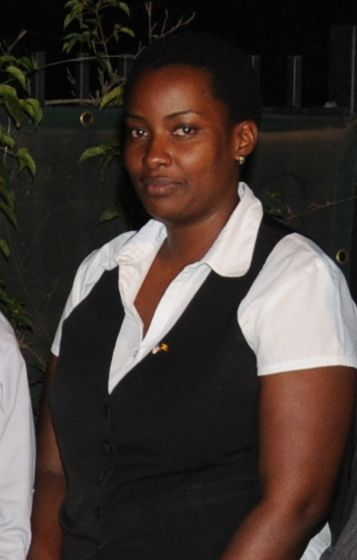
LGBT rights activist Clare Byarugaba

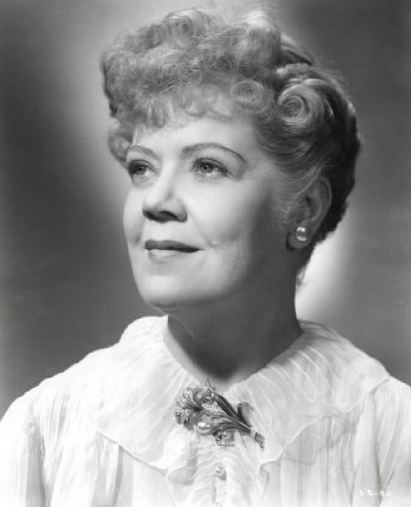
Actress Spring Byington

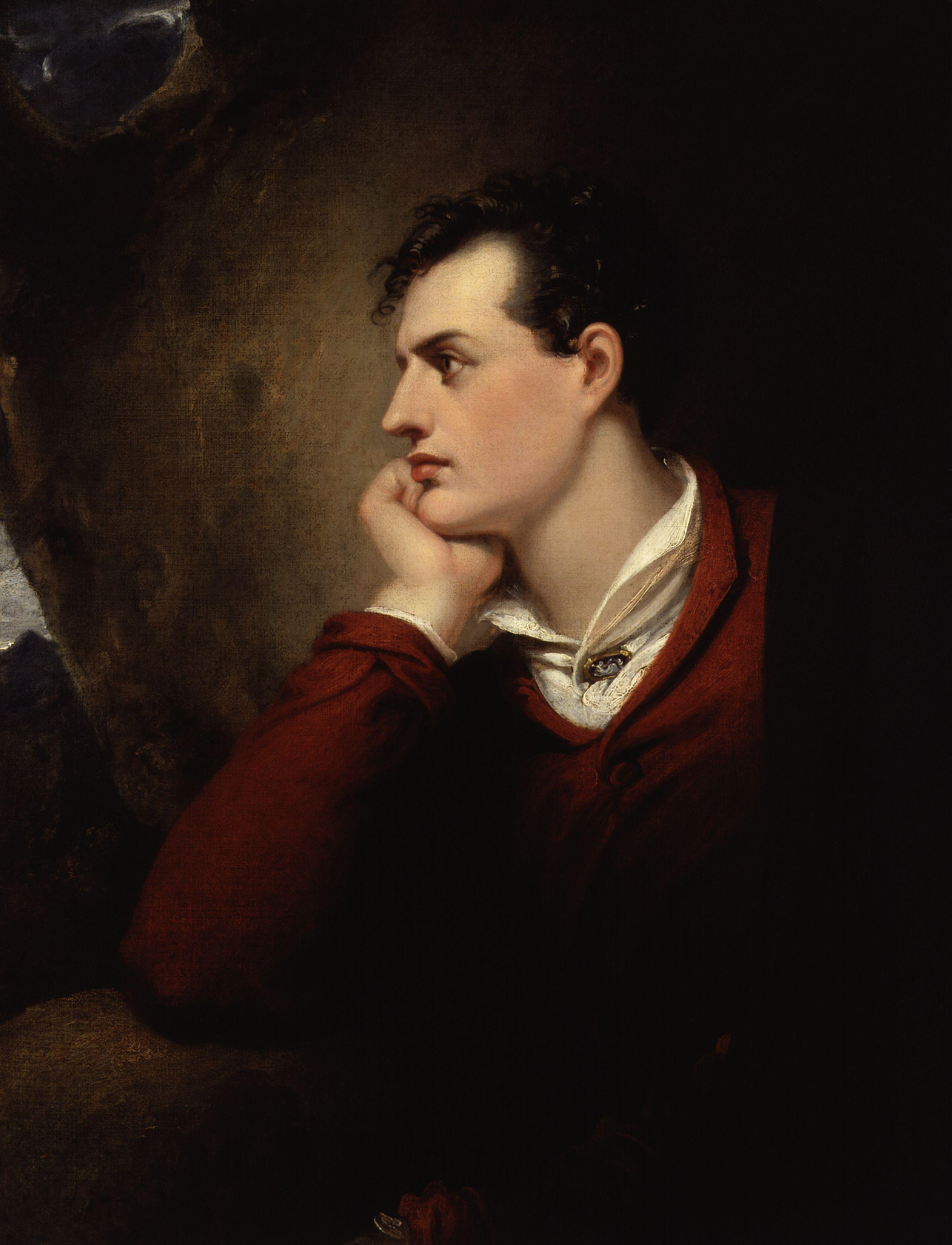
Poet Lord Byron

Name	Lifetime	Nationality	Notable as	Notes
Miron Białoszewski	1922–1983	Polish	Poet, novelist, playwright, actor	G
Hector Bianciotti	1930–2012	Argentine-French	Author	G
Stephen Bicknell	1957–2007	English	Organ builder	G
Frank Bidart	b. 1939	American	Poet	G
James Bidgood	1933–2022	American	Photographer, filmmaker	G
Robert Biedroń	b. 1976	Polish	Politician	G
Aristide von Bienefeldt	1959–2016	Dutch	Writer	G
Horst Bienek	1930–1990	German	Novelist, poet	G
Thom Bierdz	b. 1962	American	Actor	G
Christopher Biggins	b. 1948	English	Actor, TV presenter	G
Tobias Billström	b. 1973	Swedish	Politician	B
BillyBoy*	b. 1960	American	Artist, socialite, fashion designer	G
Julie Bindel	b. 1962	English	Writer, feminist activist	L
Bernice Bing	1936–1998	American	Artist	L
Liz Bingham	b. ?	British	Businesswoman	L
Mark Bingham	1970–2001	American	Entrepreneur, victim of 11 September 2001 attacks	G
Charmaine Bingwa	b. 1985	Zimbabwean-Australian	Actor	L
Biofrost	b. ?	Canadian	Gamer	G
Alfred Biolek	1934–2021	German	Actor, producer	G
Elizabeth Birch	b. 1956	American	LGBT rights activist, attorney	L
Thora Birch	b. 1982	American	Actor	B
Sue Bird	b. 1980	Israeli-American	Basketball player	L
Joan E. Biren	b. 1944	American	Photographer, documentarian	L
Odin Biron	b. 1984	American	Actor	G
Balázs Birtalan	1969–2016	Hungarian	Author, poet	G
Chester Biscardi	b. 1948	American	Contemporary classical composer, academic	G
Elizabeth Bishop	1911–1979	American	Writer, poet	L
Heather Bishop	b. 1949	Canadian	Children's music performer-composer	L
Michael Bishop	b. 1942	English	Business executive	G
Jackie Biskupski	b. 1966	American	Politician	L
Norbert Bisky	b. 1970	German	Painter	G
Bill Bissett	b. 1939	Canadian	Poet	G
Dyanne Bito	b. 1991	Dutch	Footballer	L
Annlis Bjarkhamar	b. 1974	Faroese	Politician, educator	L
Björk	b. 1965	Icelandic	singer, songwriter, composer, record producer, actor	B
Dustin Lance Black	b. 1974	American	Screenwriter	G
Mhairi Black	b. 1994	Scottish	Politician	L
Persimmon Blackbridge	b. 1951	Canadian	Writer, artist	L
Tyler Blackburn	b. 1986	American	Actor, singer, model	B
Victor Blackwell	b. 1981	American	Journalist	G
Raymond Blain	1951–1992	Canadian	Politician	G
Nell Blaine	1922–1996	American	Artist	L
Maybelle Blair	b. 1927	American	Softball player	L
Marie-Claire Blais	1939–2021	Canadian	Author, playwright	L
Richard Blanco	b. 1968	American	Poet; 1st openly gay person and the youngest person to be the U.S. inaugural poet	G
Eduardo Blanco Amor	1897–1979	Spanish	Writer, journalist	G
John Blankenstein	1949–2006	Dutch	Football referee, activist	G
Doug Blasdell	1963–2007	American	Personal trainer, reality show star	G
Jonah Blechman	b. 1975	American	Actor	G
Ross Bleckner	b. 1949	American	Artist	G
Sebastian Bleisch	b. 1957	German	Writer, pornographic director	G
Larry Bliss	b. 1946	American	Politician, educator.	G
Marc Blitzstein	1905–1964	American	Classical composer, lyricist, librettist	G
Anthony Blond	1928–2008	English	Publisher, author	G
Nikki Blonsky	b. 1988	American	Actor, singer, dancer, internet personality	L
Allan Bloom	1930–1992	American	Philosopher	G
Amy Bloom	b. 1953	American	Writer	L
Jake Blount	b. 1995	American	Bluegrass and folk musician	G
Tommye Blount	b. ?	American	Poet	G
Charles M. Blow	b. 1970	American	Journalist	B
Susan Blu	b. ?	American	Voice actress, director	L
Lionel Blue	1930–2016	English	First openly gay rabbi in the UK, broadcaster	G
Hans Blüher	1888-1955	German	Writer, philosopher	G
Ditlev Blunck	1798–1853	Danish	Painter	G
Anthony Blunt	1907–1983	English	Art historian, spy	G
Crispin Blunt	b. 1960	English	Politician	G
Brooke Blurton	b. 1995	Australian	Youth worker, media personality	B
Kristin Blystad-Bjerke	b. 1980	Norwegian	Footballer	L
Lucilla Boari	b. 1997	Italian	Recurve archer	L
Julio Bocca	b. 1967	Argentine	Ballet dancer	G
Klaus Bondam	b. 1963	Danish	Actor, politician	G
Konrad Boehmer	1941–2014	Dutch	Contemporary classical composer	G
Randy Boehning	b. 1962	American	Politician	B
Tom Boellstorff	b. ?	American	Anthropologist	G
Catherina Boevey	1669–1726	English	Philanthropist	L
Dirk Bogarde	1921–1999	English	Actor	G
Yuri Bogatyryov	1947–1989	Russian	Actor	B
Alexandru Bogdan-Pitești	1870–1922	Romanian	Symbolist poet, essayist, and art and literary critic	G
Catherine Bohart	b. 1988	Irish	Stand-up comedian, writer, actor	B
David Bohnett	b. 1956	American	Entrepreneur	G
André Boisclair	b. 1966	Canadian	Politician	G
Brian Boitano	b. 1963	American	Figure skater	G
Louise Boije af Gennäs	b. 1961	Swedish	Writer, feminist, author	L
Boki 13	b. 1986	Macedonian	Singer	G
Bola de Nieve (Ignacio Jacinto Villa Fernández)	1911–1971	Brazilian	Singer-pianist, songwriter	G
Marc Bolan	1947–1977	English	Guitarist, singer (T. Rex)	B
Jason Bolden	b. 1982	American	Fashion stylist	G
Nicholas Boles	b. 1965	English	Politician	G
Florinda Bolkan	b. 1941	Brazilian	Actor	L
Andrew Bolton	b. 1966	English	Museum curator	G
Ray Boltz	b. 1953	American	Singer-songwriter	G
Matt Bomer	b. 1977	American	Actor	G
Damien Bona	1955–2012	American	Film historian	G
Cris Bonacci	b. 1964	Australian	Rock musician (Girlschool), producer	L
Michael Boncoeur	?-1991	Canadian	Comedian, television and radio writer	G
Klaus Bondam	b. 1963	Danish	Actor, politician	G
Jacopo Bonfadio	1508–1550	Italian	Humanist, historian (executed due to his homosexuality)	G
Rosa Bonheur	1822–1899	French	Painter, sculptor	L
William Bonin	1947–1996	American	Serial killer	G
Abel Bonnard	1883–1968	French	Writer	G
Sully Bonnelly	b. 1956	Dominican	Fashion designer	G
DeWanna Bonner	b. 1987	American	Basketball player	L
Gillian Bonner	b. 1966	American	Model	B
Theo van den Boogaard	b. 1948	Dutch	Cartoonist	G
James Booker	1939–1983	American	Rhythm and blues musician	G
Peter Bonsall-Boone	1938–2017	Australian	Activist	G
Zachary Booth	b. 1983	American	Actor	G
Mel Boozer	1946–1987	American	LGBT-rights activist	G
Jobriath Boone	1946–1983	American	Musician, actor	G
Lizzie Borden	b. 1958	American	Filmmaker	B
Walter Borden	b. 1942	Canadian	Actor, playwright	G
Jake Borelli	b. 1991	American	Actor	G
Renata Borgatti	1894–1964	Italian	Classical musician	L
Barrie Jean Borich	b. ?	American	Writer	L
Trevor Boris	b. 1978	Canadian	Comedian	G
Alejandra Borrero	b. 1962	Colombian	Actor	L
David Borrow	b. 1962	English	Politician	G
Francisco Bosch	b. 1982	Spanish	Actor, dancer	G
Joshua Boschee	b. 1982	American	Politician	G
Lorna Boschman	b. 1955	Canadian	Media artist, filmmaker, curator, educator	L
Miguel Bosé	b. 1956	Spanish	Singer, actor	G
Julia Boseman	b. ?	American	Politician	L
Henriëtte Bosmans	1895–1952	Dutch	Composer	B
Raphael Bostic	b. 1966	American	Economist, academic, 15th CEO of the Federal Reserve Bank of Atlanta	G
John Boswell	1947–1994	American	Historian	G
Carlo Boszhard	b. 1969	Dutch	TV personality, actor	G
Tom Bosworth	b. 1990	English	Racewalker	G
Erik Bottcher	b. 1979	American	Politician	G
Ivy Bottini	1926–2021	American	Activist, artist	L
Rodolfo Bottino	1959–2011	Brazilian	Actor, cook, restaurateur	B
António Botto	1897–1959	Portuguese	Writer	G
Fortunato Botton Neto	1963–1997	Brazilian	Convicted serial killer	G
Roddy Bottum	b. 1963	American	Rock musician (Imperial Teen, Faith No More)	G
Michel-Marc Bouchard	b. 1958	Canadian	Playwright	G
Brigitte Boucheron	b. 1947	French	Activist	L
Tom Bouden	b. 1971	Belgian	Comic strip artist	G
Erica Bougard	b. 1993	American	Hepathlete	L
André Boulerice	b. 1946	Canadian	Politician	G
Charles Karel Bouley	b. 1962	American	Radio personality, writer	G
Nina Bouraoui	b. 1967	French	Author	L
Gaël Bourgeois	b. 1983	Swiss	Politician	G
Bette Bourne	b. 1939	English	Actor	G
Matthew Bourne	b. 1960	English	Choreographer	G
Sipke Jan Bousema	b. 1976	Dutch	TV presenter, actor	G
Adam Bouska	b. 1983	American	Photographer	G
Virginie Bovie	1821–1888	Belgian	Painter, arts patron	L
Brittany Bowe	b. 1988	American	Speed skater	L
Elizabeth Bowen	1899–1973	Irish-British	Novelist, short story writer	B
Jeff Bowen	b. 1971	American	Actor	G
Anthony Bowens	b. 1990	American	Professional wrestler	G
Scotty Bowers	1923–2019	American	Marine, former pimp	B
Leigh Bowery	1961–1994	Australian	Performance artist	B
Angie Bowie	b. 1950	American	Model	B
David Bowie	1947–2016	English	Rock singer	B
Jane Bowles	1917–1973	American	Writer	B
Paul Bowles	1910–1999	American	Classical composer, author	B
Jeffrey Bowyer-Chapman	b. 1984	Canadian	Actor, model	G
Karin Boye	1900–1941	Swedish	Writer	L
Keith Boykin	b. 1965	American	Author, broadcaster, political advisor	G
Raelene Boyle	b. 1951	Australian	Sprinter	L
John Boyne	b. 1971	Irish	Novelist	G
Daniel Boys	b. 1979	English	Actor	G
Juan Boza Sánchez	1941–1991	Cuban	Artist	G
Joop Braakhekke	1941–2016	Dutch	Chef, restaurateur, TV presenter, author	G
Luc Bradet	b. 1969	Canadian	Figure skater	G
Edwin Emmanuel Bradford	1860–1944	English	Uranian poet	G
Maureen Bradley	b. ?	Canadian	Filmmaker	L
Ben Bradshaw	b. 1960	English	Politician	G
Luisa Bradshaw-White	b. 1974	English	Actor	L
Fern Brady	b. 1986	Scottish	Comedian, writer	B
Stephen Brady	b. 1959	Australian	Official Secretary to the Governor-General of Australia	G
Alice Braga	b. 1983	Brazilian	Actor, producer	L
Howard Bragman	1956–2023	American	Writer	G
Joe Brainard	1942–1994	American	Artist, writer	G
Christopher Bram	b. 1952	American	Writer	G
Wilfrid Brambell	1912–1985	Irish	Actor	G
John Paul Brammer	b. ?	American	Writer	G
Adolf Brand	1874–1945	German	Writer, LGBT rights activist	B
Dionne Brand	b. 1953	Canadian	Writer	L
Jens Brandenburg	b. 1986	German	Politician	G
Marlon Brando	1924–2004	American	Actor	B
Johnny Brandon	1925–2017	English	Singer	G
Marcus Brandon	b. 1975	American	Politician	G
Jay Brannan	b. 1982	American	Actor, musician	G
Gerd Brantenberg	b. 1941	Norwegian	Author, activist	L
Ben Brantley	b. 1954	American	Theatre critic	G
Guy Branum	b. 1975	American	Comedian, writer	G
Karan Brar	b. 1999	American	Actor	B
Febrônio Índio do Brasil	1895–1984	Brazilian	Serial killer	G
Erlend Bratland	b. 1991	Norwegian	Pop singer	G
Elegance Bratton	b. 1979	American	Filmmaker, filmographer	G
Netalie Braun	b. 1978	Israeli	Filmmaker, writer	L
Sabine Braun	b. 1965	German	Track and field athlete	L
Erica Brausen	1908–1992	German	Art dealer	L
Michele Bravi	b. 1994	Italian	Pop singer	B
Claudio Bravo	1936–2011	Chilean	Painter	G
Kayla Braxton	b. 1991	American	Sports broadcaster	B
Alan Bray	1948–2001	American	Historian, LGBT rights activist	G
Yvonne de Bray	1889–1954	French	Actor	L
Rudolf Brazda	1913–2011	German	WWII concentration camp survivor convicted under Germany's Paragraph 175 criminal code against homosexuality	G
Kelly Brazier	b. 1989	New Zealand	Rugby union player	L
Bunny Breckinridge	1903–1996	American	Actor	G
Abraham Bredius	1855–1946	Dutch	Art collector	G
Patrick Breen	b. 1960	American	Actor, playwright, screenwriter, director	B
Claudia de Breij	b. 1975	Dutch	Comedian, singer, TV personality, radio DJ	L
Andy Brennan	b. 1993	Australian	Footballer (first openly gay male soccer player from Australia)	G
Barbara Brenner	1951–2013	American	Activist	L
Linda Bresonik	b. 1983	German	Footballer	B
Jeremy Brett	1933–1995	English	Actor	B
Allison Brewer	b. 1954	Canadian	Politician	L
Harry Brewis	b. 1992	English	YouTube personality and essayist	B
Wally Brewster	b. 1960	American	Ambassador	G
Otokar Březina	1868–1929	Czech	Symbolist, poet, essayist	G
Thomas Brezina	b. 1963	Austrian	Children's author, TV presenter	G
Jean-Claude Brialy	1933–2007	French	Actor	G
Aaron Bridgers	1918–2003	American	Musician	G
Alicia Bridges	b. 1953	American	Pop singer	L
James Bridges	1936–1993	American	Screenwriter, director	G
Susie Bright	b. 1958	American	Writer, broadcaster	B
Deborah Brin	b. 1953	American	Rabbi	L
Mark Brindal	b. 1948	Australian	Politician	G
Dave Brindle	b. ?	Canadian	Journalist	G
Jos Brink	1942–2007	Dutch	Actor, musician	G
Josefin Brink	b. 1969	Swedish	Politician	L
Mónica Briones	1950–1984	Chilean	Painter, sculptor	L
Joanna Briscoe	b. 1963	English	Author	L
Scott Brison	b. 1967	Canadian	Member of Parliament	G
Jabari Brisport	b. 1987	American	Politician (1st openly gay person of color elected to the New York State Legislature), activist, public school teacher	G
Patrick Bristow	b. 1962	American	Actor, comedian	G
Janine Brito	b. ?	American	Comedian	L
Harry Britt	1938–2020	American	Political activist, politician	G
Benjamin Britten	1913–1976	English	Classical composer, conductor	G
Leopoldo Brizuela	b. 1963	Argentine	Writer, translator	G
Ana Brnabić	b. 1975	Serbian	Politician, first female and first openly gay Prime Minister of Serbia	L
David Brock	b. 1962	American	Writer	G
Lino Brocka	1939–1991	Filipino	Filmmaker	G
Q. Allan Brocka	b. 1972	American	Director	G
Bill Brochtrup	b. 1963	American	Actor	G
Belle Brockhoff	b. 1993	Australian	Snowboarder	L
Daniel Brocklebank	b. 1979	English	Actor	G
Lois Bromfield	b. ?	Canadian	Comedian, screenwriter	L
David Bromstad	b. 1973	American	TV personality, fashion designer	G
Michael Bronski	b. 1949	American	Writer, academic	G
Steve Bronski	1960–2021	Scottish	Pop musician (Bronski Beat)	G
Harry Bronson	b. 1959	American	Politician, attorney	G
Rupert Brooke	1887–1915	English	Poet	B
Katherine Brooks	b. 1976	American	Movie director	L
Louise Brooks	1906–1985	American	Actor	B
Romaine Brooks	1874–1970	American	Painter	B
Sarah M. Broom	b. 1979	American	Writer	L
Brigid Brophy	1929–1995	English	Writer	B
Nicole Brossard	b. 1943	Canadian	Poet, novelist	L
Ian Brossat	b. 1980	French	Politician	G
Trev Broudy	b. 1968	American	Actor, model	G
Gayle Broughton	b. 1996	New Zealand	Rugby union player	L
Bob Brown	b. 1944	Australian	Senator, first openly gay member of the Australian Parliament	G
Derren Brown	b. 1971	English	Psychological illusionist/mentalist	G
Erin Brown	b. 1979	English	Actor, model, filmmaker	B
Jasmin Savoy Brown	b. 1994	American	Actor	L
Jason Brown	b. 1994	American	Figure skater	G
Jericho Brown	b. 1976	American	Poet, professor	G
Karamo Brown	b. 1980	American	TV personality, activist	G
Kate Brown	b. 1960	American	Politician	B
Lynne Brown	b. 1961	South African	Politician	L
Margaret Wise Brown	1910–1952	American	Writer	B
Michael Brown	b. 1951	English	Journalist, politician	G
Neil Brown	b. 1940	Australian	Politician	G
Nick Brown	b. 1950	English	Politician	G
Panama Al Brown	1902–1951	Panamanian	Boxer	G
Rebecca Brown	b. 1956	American	Writer	L
Rita Mae Brown	b. 1944	American	Author, activist	L
Roger Brown	1925–1997	American	Social psychologist	G
Spencer Brown	b. 1994	American	Electronic dance musician, producer, DJ	G
Tim Brown	b. 1962	American	Politician	G
Wendy Brown	b. 1955	American	Political theorist	L
John Browne	b. 1948	English	Oil executive, member of the House of Lords	G
Thom Browne	b. 1965	American	Fashion designer	G
Oscar Browning	1837–1923	English	Writer, historian	G
Carrie Brownstein	b. 1974	American	Rock musician (Sleater-Kinney)	B
Harvey Brownstone	b. 1956	Canadian	Judge	G
Victoria Brownworth	1956–2025	American	Journalist, writer, editor	L
Carlos Bruce	b. 1957	Peruvian	Politician	G
Tammy Bruce	b. 1962	American	Author	L
David Brudnoy	1940–2004	American	Talk radio host	G
Til Brugman	1888–1958	Dutch	Poet, linguist	G
Erik Bruhn	1928–1986	Danish	Dancer	G
Chantal de Bruijn	b. 1976	Dutch	Field hockey player	L
Tyler Brûlé	b. 1968	Canadian	Journalist	G
Lisa Brummel	b. 1959/1960	American	Former Executive Vice President, Human Resources for Microsoft Corporation	L
Bruna	b. 1984	Brazilian	Footballer	L
Roxane Bruneau	b. 1991	Canadian	Pop singer, songwriter	L
Frank Bruni	b. 1964	American	Journalist	G
Rachele Bruni	b. 1990	Italian	Swimmer	L
Gioia Bruno	b. 1963	American	Pop musician (Exposé)	B
Manfred Bruns	b. 1934	German	LGBT rights activist	B
Charity Bryant	1777–1851	American	Tailor	L
Chris Bryant	b. 1962	English	Politician	G
Dorien Bryant	b. 1985	American	Football player	G
Bryher	1894–1983	English	Writer	L
B.Slade	b. 1975	American	Entertainer	G
Dan Bucatinsky	b. 1965	American	Actor	G
Amandine Buchard	b. 1995	French	Judoka	L
Horst Buchholz	1933–2003	German	Actor	B
Pancrazio Buciunì	1879–1963	Italian	Artist's model	B
Ed Buck	b. 1954	American	Businessman, activist, Democratic political fundraiser	G
Norman Buckley	b. 1955	American	TV director	G
Raymond Buckley	b. 1959	American	Politician	G
Ron Buckmire	b. 1968	Grenadian-American	Mathematician, activist	G
Anastasia Bucsis	b. 1989	Canadian	Speed skater	L
Dragoș Bucurenci	b. 1981	Romanian	Communication strategist, social activist, journalist, TV personality	B
Eddie Buczynski	1947–1989	American	Wiccan, archaeologist, gay rights activist	G
Zsuzsanna Budapest	b. 1940	Hungarian-American	Author, proponent of female spirituality	L
Saskia Budgett	b. 1996	English	Rower	L
Viktorija Budrytė-Winnersjo	b. 1989	Lithuanian	Footballer	L
Ryan Buell	b. 1982	American	Paranormal investigator, TV personality	B
Bernard Buffet	1928-1999	French	Expressionist artist	B
Traude Bührmann	b. 1942	German	Writer, journalist, photographer, translator	L
Florin Buhuceanu	b. 1971	Romanian	LGBT rights activist	G
Anne Buijs	b. 1991	Dutch	Volleyball player	L
Concha Buika	b. 1972	Spanish	Singer	B
John Albert Bullbrook	1882–1967	English	Archaeologist	G
Jim J. Bullock	b. 1955	American	Actor	G
Charlotte Bunch	b. 1944	American	Author, activist	L
Lady Bunny	b. 1962	American	Drag performer, DJ, promoter	G
Filippo Buonaccorsi	1437–1496	Italian	Renaissance humanist, writer	G
Victor Buono	1938–1982	American	Actor, comic	G
Ernst Burchard	1876–1920	German	Physician, sexologist, gay rights activist	G
Julie Burchill	b. 1959	English	Writer	B
Ross Burden	1968–2014	New Zealand	Celebrity chef	G
Barbara Burford	1944–2010	Jamaican-British	Medical researcher, poet, writer	L
Guy Burgess	1911–1963	English	Spy	G
Jim Burgess	1953–1993	American	Record producer	G
Tituss Burgess	b. 1979	American	Actor, singer	G
Trevor Burgess	b. ?	American	Entrepreneur	G
Wilma Burgess	1939-2003	American	Country music singer	L
Brendan Burke	1988–2010	Canadian	Ice hockey player	G
Glenn Burke	1952–1995	American	Baseball player	G
Ronnie Burkett	b. 1957	Canadian	Puppeteer	G
Davis Burleson	b. 2002	American	Social media personality	G
Kris Burley	b. 1974	Canadian	Gymnast	G
Bruce Burnett	1954–1985	New Zealand	HIV/AIDs activist	G
Joel Burns	b. 1969	American	Politician	G
Pete Burns	1959–2016	English	Pop singer-songwriter (Dead or Alive)	B
John Burnside	1916–2008	American	Inventor	G
Chandler Burr	b. 1963	American	Author	G
Raymond Burr	1917–1993	Canadian	Actor	B
Anne Burrell	b. 1969	American	Chef, TV personality	L
Geoffrey Burridge	1948–1987	English	Actor	G
Augusten Burroughs	b. 1965	American	Writer	G
William S. Burroughs	1914–1997	American	Writer	G
Saffron Burrows	b. 1973	English-American	Actor	B
Paul Burston	b. 1965	English	Journalist, author	G
David Burtka	b. 1975	American	Actor, chef	G
Gary Burton	b. 1943	American	Jazz musician	G
Charles Busch	b. 1954	American	Playwright, actor	G
Wolfgang Busch	b. 1955	German-American	Filmmaker	G
Rachel Kramer Bussel	b. 1976	American	Author, columnist	L
Ivan Bussens	1960–2007	English	Water polo player	G
Sylvano Bussotti	b. 1931	Italian	Contemporary classical composer	G
Dorothy Bussy	1865–1960	English	Writer	B
Mikey Bustos	b. 1981	Canadian	Singer, comedian	B
Andy Butler	b. ?	American	Musician (Hercules and Love Affair)	G
Dan Butler	b. 1954	American	Actor	G
John Butler	b. 1972	Irish	Director, screenwriter, novelist	G
Judith Butler	b. 1956	American	Philosopher	L
Laphonza Butler	b. 1979	American	Politician	L
Samuel Butler	1835–1902	English	Author	G
William Butler	b. 1968	American	Actor, writer, director, make-up artist, special effects technician, producer	G
Pete Buttigieg	b. 1982	American	Politician and 1st openly gay Democratic presidential candidate	G
Jerry Buttimer	b. 1967	Irish	Politician	G
Jeffrey Buttle	b. 1982	Canadian	Figure skater	G
Orkut Büyükkökten	b. 1975	Turkish	Computer scientist, software engineer	G
Clare Byarugaba	b. 1987	Ugandan	LGBT rights activist	L
Beth Bye	b. ?	American	Politician	L
Latasha Byears	b. 1973	American	Basketball player	L
Spring Byington	1886–1971	American	Actor	B
Witter Bynner	1881–1968	American	Author	G
Rory Fleck Byrne	b. 1988	Irish	Actor, composer	G
Lord Byron	1788–1824	English	Poet	B

== See also ==
- List of gay, lesbian or bisexual people
