= Julie Mutesasira =

Ugandan gospel singer

- Born: Julie Birungi; 27 February 1978 (age 48); Kampala, Uganda
- Other names: Julie Naluggya, Julie Mutesasira
- Citizenship: Ugandan, Canadian
- Occupation: Singer
- Years active: 2003–present
- Spouses: Pastor Steven Mutesasira (divorced) Jean (m. 2020)
- Children: Esther, Elizabeth and Ezekiel Mutesasira

Julie Mutesasira (born 27 February 1978), professionally known as Julie Birungi and Julie Naluggya, is a Ugandan-Canadian gospel singer and musician.

She is known in Uganda, and across East Africa for her songs like Nkulembera, Lwana Nabo, Ekikunyumira and Bamuyita Yesu, a collaboration with Iryn Namubiru.

She received the best female gospel song award for her song Saba in 2014 and the Best Religious Song award for her song List Ya Mukama in 2015 and was nominated for Best Religious Song for her song Kijja Kugwa in 2016 at the third, fourth and fifth HiPipo Music Awards respectively. She won the Song of the year award at the Olive Gospel Music Awards in 2012, the Female artist of the year award at VIGA Awards in 2016, Diva Collabo Award for Yani, a collaboration with Iryn Namubiru at the 2011 DIVA Awards.

== Personal life and career ==
Julie's parents are the late Henry Ssebatta and Rose Lutwama. Julie Mutesasira was married to Pastor Steven Mutesasira of the Redeemed of the Lord Evangelistic Church, Kamwookya and they are now divorced. The couple had three children, Esther Mutesasira, Ezekiel Mutesasira and Elizabeth Mutesasira, two of whom, Esther and Ezekiel, were the winners of East Africa's Got Talent in 2019. The couple divorced in 2016 and she relocated to Canada. In 2020, she publicly revealed that she is a lesbian and the same year was married to her wife Jean.

Julie recorded her first single titled Nakwagala in 2004.

== Discography ==
- Asobola
- Ntelekera
- Ekikunyumira
- Tokikola
- Gwenjagala
- Tokola Ensobi
- Nkizudde
- Ngateyakutonderwa
- Lwana Nabo
- List Ya Mukama
- Nzuuno
- Tambula
- Nkulembera
- Bewunya
- Saba
- Sseyeya
- Ninze
- Kijja Kugwa
- Wantwala
- Njagala Okuyimba
- Ankuuma
- Ndayira
- Sikyaadayo
- Katonda Nange
- Nkwagala
- Gwenjagala
- Lwana Naabo
- Linda
- Yani (Bamuyita Yesu)

== See also ==
- Godiva Akullo
- Clare Byarugaba
- Richard Lusimbo
- Jackie Senyonjo
