= Mbiyu =

Mbiyu is a name. It may refer to:

- David Mbiyu (born 1971), English freelance photojournalist
- Mbiyu Koinange (1907–1981), Kenyan politician
- Koinange Wa Mbiyu (1866–1960), Kenyan Kikuyu chief
