= Godiva Akullo =

Ugandan high court advocate and feminist lawyer

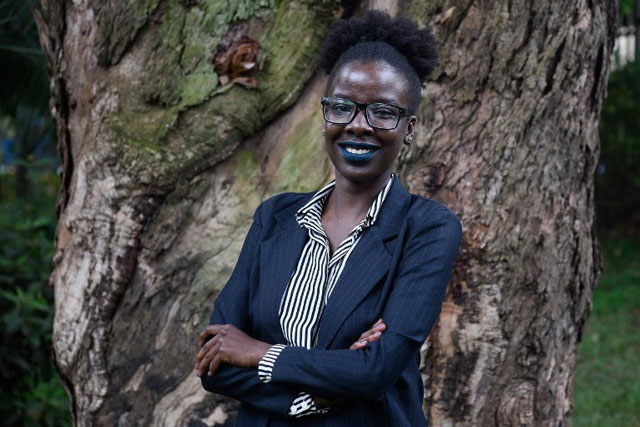
- Godiva Akullo
- Education: Makerere University, Bachelor of Law Law Development Centre, Diploma in Legal Practice from Law Development in Uganda
- Occupations: Ugandan high court advocate, LGBT activist in Uganda, consultant in areas of sexuality, Gender and Law, and Human Rights, and a lecturer of Law
- Employer: Uganda High Court
- Known for: LGBT Activism and Human Rights in Uganda

Godiva Akullo is an advocate of the High Court of Uganda and a feminist. They are an LGBTQ and women's rights activist in Uganda, consultant in areas of Sexuality, Gender and Law, and Human Rights, and a Lecturer of Law.

== Education ==
They studied at Makerere University in Uganda and graduated with a Bachelor of Law Degree, Diploma in Legal Practice from Law Development in Uganda(LDC). They hold a Master's Degree of Law from Harvard University.

== Published articles ==
Godiva Akullo published many articles including;

- Once Again: Ugandan Politicians Stoking Anti-LGBTQ+ Sentiment to Stay in Power.
- Uganda: Fueling anti-LGBTQI sentiment to stay in power.
- Those who rape and murder women will kill you too.

== See also ==
1. Dorcus Acen
2. Kasha Jacqueline Nabagesera
3. Stella Nansikombi Makubuya
4. Clare Byarugaba
5. Richard Lusimbo
6. Julie Mutesasira
