= Esther and Ezekiel =

Ugandan singing duo

Esther and Ezekiel Muteesasira
- Origin: Kampala, Uganda
- Genres: pop music; R&B; gospel music
- Years active: 2019–present
- Members: Esther Muteesasira; Ezekiel Muteesasira

Esther and Ezekiel Muteesasira are a Ugandan sibling singing duo who won the first season of East Africa's Got Talent in October 2019, at the ages of 14 (Esther) and 11 (Ezekiel).

They are the daughter and son of Ugandan gospel singer Julie Muteesasira and Pastor Steven Mutesasira.

== Life and career ==
Esther and Ezekiel come from a musical family. Their mother, Julie Muteesasira, is a Ugandan gospel singer who has had a number of hits, like "Ekikunyumira," "Lwana Nabo," and "Nterekera" in Uganda. During an interview on Kenya's Citizen TV, Ezekiel revealed how he got into music by watching his mother and trying to do everything she did. Esther revealed how her aunt discovered her singing capabilities and secretly recorded her singing around their home. The duo, together with their parents, are involved in charity work and during an interview with New Vision after their win, they revealed that they would build an orphanage for homeless children. Their mother later got divorced and came out as a gay woman, and the two children moved to Canada to live with their mother after being separated for 5 years.

=== East Africa's Got Talent ===
Esther and Ezekiel's audition tape was submitted by their aunt, who had discovered them in 2017 as singers. They sang Alexandra Burke's version of "Hallelujah" at the theater auditions, receiving yeses from all four judges and making it to the live shows. They sang Andra Day's 2015 song "Rise Up" at the live shows. They did not get the public vote to continue to the finals, as the public votes were given to Rwanda's Intayoberana. However, they were selected by three judges, Gaetano Kagwa, Makeda, and Jeff Koinange, to continue to the finals. For their finals performance, the duo sang Whitney Houston and Mariah Carey's 1998 single "When You Believe." They received the most votes at the finals, winning the competition and taking home the US$50,000 (Ugs184 million) cash prize and a congratulatory message from President Yoweri Museveni, who called them his grandchildren (bazukulu).

== Canada's Got Talent ==
After relocating to Canada to live with their now single mother, Esther and Ezekiel took part in Canada's Got Talent season 2 and got a standing ovation by the audience and judges and advanced to the second round.
