= Judith Babirye =

Ugandan gospel musician and politician

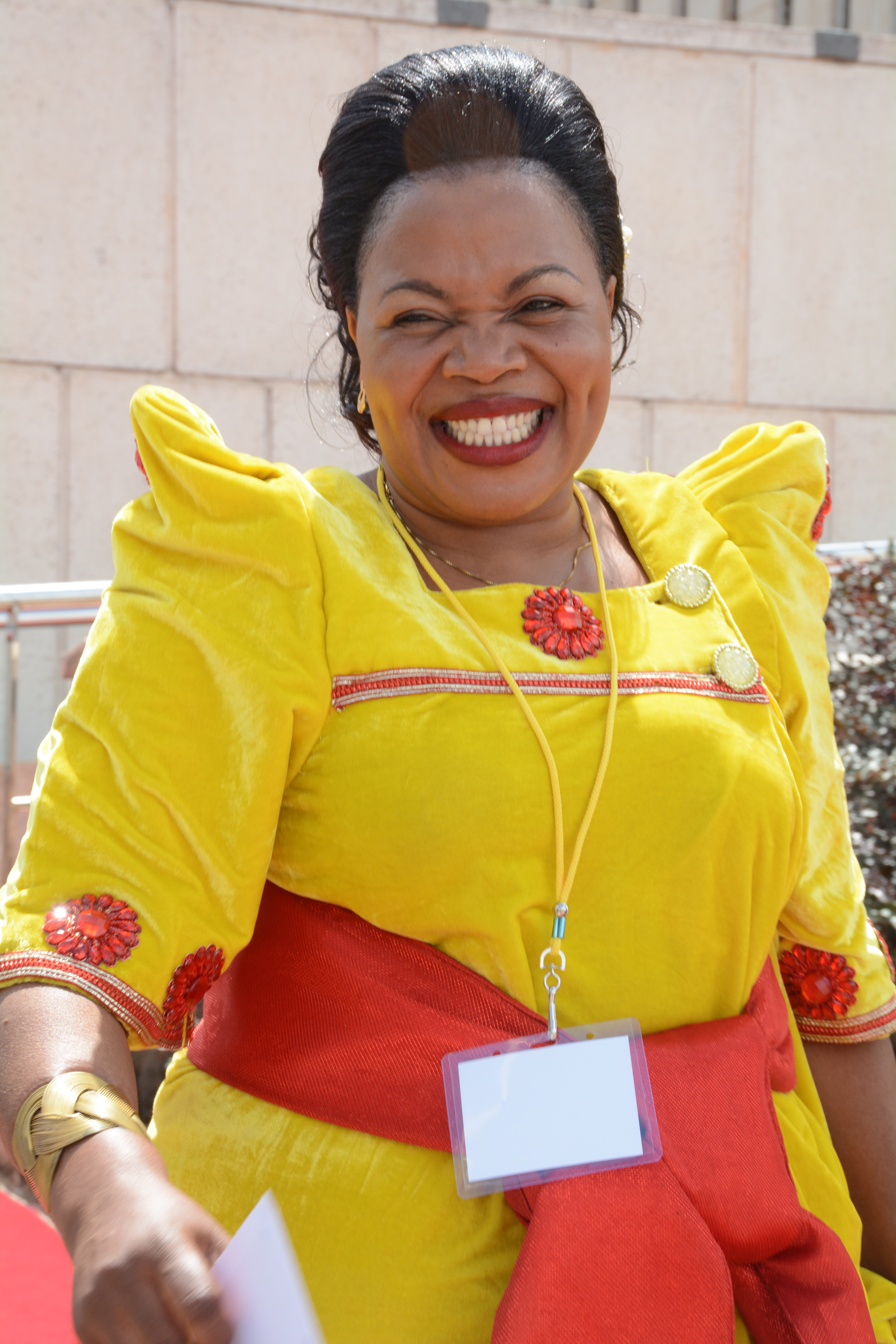
- Born: 23 September 1977 (age 49); Nyenga, Uganda
- Citizenship: Uganda
- Education: Makerere University (Bachelor of Arts in Tourism)
- Occupations: Religious leader, gospel musician, Politician
- Years active: 2001–present
- Known for: Gospel Music
- Title: Member of Parliament for Buikwe District Women Constituency
- Term: 2016–2021
- Spouse: Paul Musoke Ssebulime (m. 2018)

Judith Babirye (born 23 September 1977) is a Ugandan gospel musician and politician. She is a senior pastor at New Life Deliverance Church, located in Makindye Division, in the southeastern part of Kampala, Uganda's capital city.

She also served as the elected Member of Parliament representing Buikwe District Women Constituency in the 10th Parliament (2016–2021).

== Early life and education ==
Babirye was born in Nyenga, Buikwe District, to Mr and Mrs Mukooza, on 23 September 1977. She attended Nalinya Lwantale Primary School in Luweero District. She studied at Ndejje Senior School for her O-Level education and at Iganga Secondary School for her A-Level studies, graduating with a High School Diploma in 1998.

She was admitted to Makerere University, Uganda's oldest and largest public university, where she graduated in 2001 with a Bachelor of Arts in Tourism degree.

== Music career ==
When Babirye was in Senior Two at Ndejje Secondary School, she won the music composition festivals in which they were tasked to compose the school anthem. At Iganga, she also composed the school anthem sparking off her musical career.

Her debut song, "Beera Nange", won the best gospel single in the 2006 Pearl of Africa Music Awards. She has had hits like "Wambatira", "Omusaayi gwa Yesu", "Ekitibwa kyo Mukama" and "Maama".

== Personal life ==
Babirye was married to Niiwo with whom they have a daughter. However, in January 2017, she filed for divorce. She later married Paul Musoke Sebulime, on 28 July 2018, in a traditional ceremony.

== Discography ==
=== Songs ===
- Ampisizaawo
- Golokoka
- Wanonda
- Maama
- Wambatira
- Wanonda
- Beera Nange
- Eno Mbaga

=== Albums ===
- Beera Nange, 2006
- Yesu Asobola, 2007
- Nzijukira, 2008
- Wanjagala, 2011

== Awards and recognition ==
- Best gospel single, "Beera nange", in the 2006 Pearl of Africa Music Awards.
- Album of the year in Victoria Gospel Music Awards (VIGA), 2007.

== Family ==
In 2005, Judith Babirye was married to Samuel Niwo and became the parents of one daughter circa 2006. They separated in 2009. In January 2017, Babirye filed for divorce.

In 2018 she married Paul Musoke Ssebulime, at that time the MP representing Buikwe North Constituency. It was the second marriage for each of them.

== See also ==
- Jackie Senyonjo
- Julie Muteesasira
