= Nashiba Nakabira =

- Born: Uganda
- Education: Makerere University (MA, Peace and Conflict Studies); Kyambogo University (BA, Social Sciences)
- Occupations: Peacebuilding practitioner, Youth development professional
- Years active: c. 2018–present
- Employer: Sisters for Peace Initiative (SPI)
- Organization: Sisters for Peace Initiative (SPI)
- Known for: Peacebuilding, youth and women empowerment, preventing violent extremism
- Notable work: Community-based peacebuilding programs in Uganda
- Title: Head of Programs

Nashiba Nakabira is a Ugandan peacebuilding practitioner and youth development professional. She is known for her work in youth empowerment, gender mainstreaming, and community-based approaches to preventing violent extremism.

== Early life and education ==
Nakabira holds a Master of Arts in Peace and Conflict Studies from Makerere University and a Bachelor of Arts in Social Sciences from Kyambogo University. Her academic work has focused on issues related to peacebuilding, governance, and social development.

== Career ==
She is serving as the African Union Youth Ambassador for Peace (AYAP) for the East African region. She is a co-founder of the Sisters for Peace Initiative (SPI), a women-led non-profit organization focused on peacebuilding and preventing violent extremism. She serves as Head of Programs at SPI, where she oversees program implementation and organizational activities.

== See also ==
- Sandra Kwikiriza
