= Sir Elvis =

Kenyan country singer

- Also known as: Elvis Otiono, Sir Elvis Otieno
- Born: 1977 (age 48–49); Kenya
- Genres: country
- Occupation: Singer
- Instruments: Guitar, banjo, piano
- Years active: 2000s to present

Sir Elvis (born Elvis Otieno) is a Country singer from Nairobi, Kenya. He has risen in popularity since his appearances on television. He appeared in the United States where he won an award for Best male vocalist of the year. He has been referred to as the African King of Country music. He also appeared with well-known journalist Jeff Koinange on television several times.

== Background ==
He was named after Elvis Presley by his parents. The son of a preacher, he was born in rural Kenya the year that Elvis Presley died. He is Kenya's best known country singer. A musician who play the guitar, piano and the banjo, he has been singing country music since the early 2000s. He became serious about Country music while in Norway and played in a country band. His family had been there since leaving Kenya when he was 7 years of age. When he was a student he visited the United States and there he attended his first country concert with featured Shania Twain. After seeing Twain he started soaking up the music of Jim Reeves, Charley Pride and Dolly Parton, and the more modern Country sound of Garth Brooks and Alan Jackson.

== Career ==
It was reported by Michael Chepkwony in the September 1 edition of Kenya's news paper The Standard that he was heading to the Texas Sounds International Country Music festival the following month. He was also the only nominee from Kenya scheduled to compete with 23 other international country artists. Also that month, Sir Elvis appeared alongside Citizen TV's Jeff Koinange (himself a country music lover) at the Country Roads event which was hosted at Thika Greens Golf Resort on Saturday, September 28. He is the first Luo to be Knighted at Ciala Resort with Jeff Koinange is presence,

He competed in the sixth annual Texas Sounds International Country Music festival which ran from October 17-20 and won the Best Male Vocalist of the year award. On December 31 that year, he appeared at the country crossover concert which was held at the Ngong Racecourse. The event which attracted a sizable crowd of country enthusiasts also featured Steve Rodgers.

He has yet to be signed by a record label and has yet to release a full-length album.
