= Sandra Kwikiriza =

Ugandan feminist, LBQ rights and digital rights activist

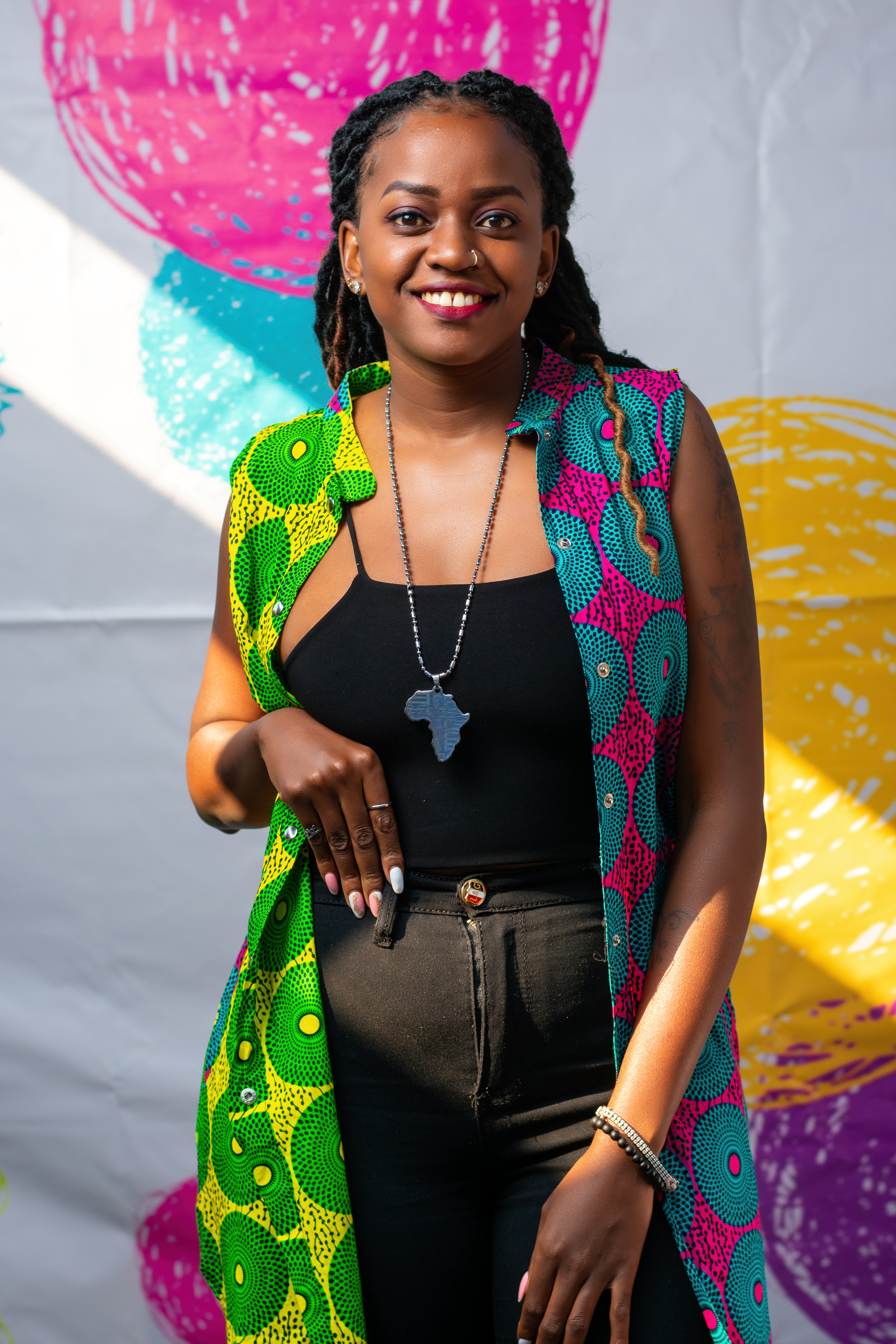
- Kwikiriza in 2022
- Born: Uganda
- Citizenship: Ugandan
- Education: African Women Leaders’ Institute
- Occupations: feminist, LBQ rights activist and digital rights activist
- Organization(s): Foundation for Women’s Health Research and Development (FORWARD), HER Internet
- Known for: Founder of Her Internet, Advocacy for digital rights
- Notable work: Advocacy on online harassment, disinformation, and digital rights
- Title: Executive Director HER Internet

Sandra Kwikiriza is a Ugandan feminist, LBQ rights activist and digital rights activist. She founded the organization HER Internet and serves as Executive Director.

== Biography ==
Kwikiriza was born in Uganda and lives in Kampala. She attended the African Women Leaders’ Institute and is a fellow of the Foundation for Women’s Health Research and Development (FORWARD).

Kwikiriza founded HER Internet, which is "a women led feminist organization that advocates for the digital rights and internet freedoms of women focusing on LBQ (lesbians, bisexual and queer) women and female sex workers" and "supports digital literacy for marginalized women." She is the HER Internet Executive Director.

Kwikiriza has raised awareness of online harassment, how women in politics are often the target of disinformation attacks during election periods, and has run workshops on how to identify and combat the effects of false information with support from the Collaboration on International ICT Policy for East and Central Africa (CIPESA Uganda). In 2022, she spoke about these issues to Executive Women Members of Parliament during a meeting organized by Women Human Rights Defenders Network (WHRDN-U).

Kwikiriza has spoken at events, such as at the Kick Off of the Digital Human Rights Lab in 2019 where she argued for a holistic approach to digital security and at the Hacks/Hackers Africa 2022 about mental health in relation to internet usage. At the Forum on Internet Freedom in Africa (FIFAfrica22) where she was part of a panel of African feminists convened by the African Women’s Development and Communication Network (FEMNET) discussing "Resistance and Connection: an African feminist perspective for decolonizing the internet." She has also spoken on colonial harm at events in Europe, delivering a talk to the Cross Party Group of Scotland’s International Development Alliance (SIDA) in 2024 covering the impact of colonialism on LGBTQ+ rights, cultural restoration and the need for intersectionality to be considered in reparations.

In 2023, she featured on an episode of the Whose Voices? podcast, covering the challenges faced by the queer community while using the internet and the ways online spaces can be safer for queer women. She is also part of the committee of the English and Spanish language Women Moving Forward Together magazine.

== See also ==
- Thelma Awori
- Godiva Akullo
