= Serro (musician) =

Kenyan musician

SERRO
- Born: Hulda Serro; Kenya
- Occupation: Musician
- Years active: 2014–present

Hulda Serro, known professionally as Serro, is a Kenyan singer, songwriter and performer of benga, afro-pop and jazz style, known for her hit singles, "Rongai" and "Kasyoki Wa Mitumba". She writes and sings in Sheng slang.

== Career ==
Serro started writing music in 2014 and released her first single, "Rongai", in 2016. "Rongai" became her signature tune until her 2019 single "Kasyoki Wa Mitumba", which she released in an acoustic version and a benga version. "Kasyoki Wa Mitumba" gained popularity since Serro performed an acoustic version of it live at East Africa's Got Talent in 2019. That same year her fifth single, "Ya Dunia", was released. In December 2019, she released another single, "Aheri" about broken promises in relationships.

== Education ==
Serro studied music at Sauti Academy and at Kenyatta University and graduated with a First Class Honours Bachelor's Degree in Music.
