= Jackie Senyonjo =

Jackie Senyonjo is a Ugandan Gospel Artiste, song writer and choir director.

== Early life and education ==
Jackie known as Jackie Tumwebaze was born to a family of four children where she is the second. She grew up from Entebbe in Uganda.

== Career ==
She started singing in her teenage years while serving in the school scripture unions. Her music career then took a step forward when she joined the Kansanga Miracle Centre Church choir. Her and two other friends started a group called Extanol which then produced a song called Gyogenda.

When Extanol broke up, Senyonjo has continued as a solo artiste since 2008. She makes music in different styles including reggae, afrobeat, zouk and RnB.

She produced two albums, Nandibaddewa and Ndoperaggwe.

== Discography ==
- Netaaga ggwe
- Nandibaddewa
- Obeerawo
- Okooye
- Sisaana
- Yanwanira
- Okuba omukazi
- Guma noyo
- Grateful
- Bumper

== Personal life ==
She took on the name Senyonjo after marrying Godfrey Ssenyonyo, a pastor at Kansanga Miracle Centre where she was serving in the choir that she joined in 1999.

She separated from her husband and moved to Canada.

== See also ==
- Judith Babirye
- Julie Muteesasira
