= East Africa's Got Talent =

- Genre: Talent show
- Created by: Simon Cowell
- Presented by: Anne Kansiime
- Judges: Season 1: Gaetano Kagwa; Makeda Mahadeo; Vanessa Mdee; Jeff Koinange
- Country of origin: Kenya
- Original languages: English, Swahili
- No. of seasons: 1
- No. of episodes: 10

Production
- Executive producer: Lee Ndayisaba
- Production locations: Kenyatta International Conference Centre, Nairobi (Auditions); Catholic University of Eastern Africa, Nairobi
- Running time: 60–120 minutes
- Production company: Rapid Blue

Original release
- Network: Citizen TV (Kenya); Clouds Media (Tanzania); RTV (Rwanda); NBS TV (Uganda)
- Release: 4 August – 6 October 2019

East Africa's Got Talent is a talent show competition that is part of the Got Talent franchise owned by Simon Cowell. It broadcasts simultaneously across four countries in East Africa: Kenya, Tanzania, Uganda, and Rwanda.

== Winners ==
Season 1: Esther and Ezekiel

== Judges ==
=== Season one ===
Jeff Koinange (Kenya)

Vanessa Mdee (Tanzania)

Makeda Mahadeo (Rwanda)

Gaetano Kagwa (Uganda)

== Show structure ==
The show has two rounds of auditions. The first round referred to as, pre-auditions is held across different cities in each participating country. The second round, referred to as, theatre auditions are done later at a setting in front of Judges and live audience.

Preliminary auditions

The pre-auditions were held in major cities in each country which included Nairobi, Mombasa, Dar es Salaam, Kampala and Kigali.

Theater auditions

Once a performance is over, each judge will give an overview of what they thought about the act, before casting a vote.

The judges are allowed to use the golden buzzer to send an act directly to the semi-finals. Each judge can only press the golden buzzer once throughout the entire season.

Deliberations

After the completion of theater auditions, the judges whittle down the acts to only eighteen to compete in the semi-finals.

Live shows

Semi-finals

The live shows include three episodes of semifinals in which the successful eighteen acts from the auditions get to compete for a spot in the finals. In each episode, six acts perform. The act with the most public vote automatically goes through to the finals while the judges choose from the 2nd and 3rd respectively in the public vote. In case of a tie, the act placed 2nd in the public vote advances to the finals. A judge can buzz if not impressed with the act. The performance can be terminated if all the judges buzz the act.

Finals

The final episode operates using the same format as the semi-finals, though this time the winner is determined purely by a public vote, with the finalists attempting to secure more votes than the others by performing a new routine at their best.

The host announces the results with the act gaining more public votes declared the winner. The winner receives a grand prize of 50 000 dollars.

== Auditions ==
The show had two rounds of auditions. The first round referred to as, pre-auditions were held across different cities in each participating country. The second round, referred to as theatre auditions, were done later at a setting in front of judges and a live audience.

Preliminary auditions

The pre-auditions were held in major cities in each country.

Theater auditions

Theater auditions were held in Mpesa foundation academy, in Kenya in front of judges and a live audience. This event was pre recorded. The judges cast a vote to either eliminate an act or send it through to the next stage.

Golden Buzzer

The judges had a choice to press the golden buzzer which sends an act direct to the semi-finals.

The first Judge to press the golden buzzer was Vanessa Mdee for Uganda's 7year old, Leyna Kagere.

Jeff Koinange pressed his second golden buzzer for Tanzania's Team Makochokocho.

The third golden buzzer from Makeda went to Hoziyana Peace (23) from Rwanda.

The last golden buzzer was pressed by Gaetano Kagwa for Uganda's Jehova Shalom Acapella.

=== Participants ===
These participants made it past theatre auditions by securing at least three yes from the judges.

Winner

Runners up

Golden Buzzer - Auditions

No.	Participant	Act	Origin	Result
1	All eyes on Us	Acrobat dancers	Uganda	Semi-Finalist
2	Leyna Kagaere	Singer	Uganda	Semi-Finalist
3	Esther and Ezekiel	Singers (duo)	Uganda	Winner
4	Jua Kali Drummers	Drummers	Kenya	Semi-Finalist
5	Peace	Singer	Rwanda	Semi-Finalist
6	DNA	Comic dancers	Uganda	Finalist
7	Tetemesha	Dancers	Kenya	Semi-Finalist
8	Yada Dance	Contemporary dancers	Kenya	Semi-Finalist
9	Liz	Gymnastic Acrobat	Tanzania	Semi-Finalist
10	Sinaubi	Instrumentalist	Tanzania	Semi-Finalist
11	Intayoberana	Cultural dancers	Rwanda	Runners up
12	Spell Cast	Singing group	Kenya	Finalist
13	Makorokocho	Dancers	Tanzania	Semi-Finalist
14	Himbaza club	Drummers	Rwanda	Semi-Finalist
15	The Mason 666	Street Dancers	Tanzania	Semi-Finalist
16	Jannell Tamara	Singer	Kenya	Finalist
17	Jehovah Shalom Acapella	A capella group	Uganda	Finalist
18	Elisha the Gift	Sunger	Rwanda	Semi-Finalist

== Semi-finals ==
The Semi finals were filmed live at Catholic University of Eastern Africa

Eighteen acts that got through from the theatre auditions battled it out in a heated competition to secure a place in the final six. Six acts performed each week and only two made the cut.

Buzzed Out | Judges' choice |
Won Public Vote | Won Judges' Vote Lost Judges' Vote

=== Semi-finals 1 (September 15) ===
Guest Performer, Results Show: Nandy

Time	Order	Semi-finalist	Origin	Act	Buzzes and Judges choice				Result 10.00pm
Time	Order	Semi-finalist	Origin	Act	Gaetano	Makeda	Vanessa	Jeff	Result 10.00pm
Sunday 8.00 Pm (EAT)	1	The Mason 666	Tanzania	Street dancers					Eliminated
Sunday 8.00 Pm (EAT)	2	Elisha the Gift	Rwanda	Singer				❌	Eliminated
Sunday 8.00 Pm (EAT)	3	All eyes on Us	Uganda	Acrobats					Eliminated (Lost Judges' Vote)
Sunday 8.00 Pm (EAT)	4	Jannell Tamara	Kenya	Singer					Advanced (Public Vote)
Sunday 8.00 Pm (EAT)	5	Himbaza Club	Rwanda	Drummers					Eliminated
Sunday 8.00 Pm (EAT)	6	Jehovah Shallom A capella	Uganda	A capella group					Advanced (Won Judges' Vote)

Non-competition performances

performer	Country	Act
Nandy	Tanzania	Singer

=== Semi-finals 2 (September 22) ===
Guest Performer, Results Show: Serro

Time	Order	Semi-Finalist	Origin	Act	Buzzes and Judges choice				Result 10.00pm
Time	Order	Semi-Finalist	Origin	Act	Gaetano	Makeda	Vanessa	Jeff	Result 10.00pm
Sunday 8.00 PM (EAT)	1	Liz Rafael	Tanzania	Gymnastic acrobatic					Eliminated
Sunday 8.00 PM (EAT)	2	Intayoberana	Rwanda	Cultural dance					Advanced (Public Vote)
Sunday 8.00 PM (EAT)	3	Esther & Ezekiel	Uganda	Singers(duo)					Advanced (Won Judges' Vote)
Sunday 8.00 PM (EAT)	4	Yada Dance	Kenya	Contemporary Dancers					Eliminated
Sunday 8.00 PM (EAT)	5	Leyna Kagere	Uganda	Singer					Eliminated (Lost Judges' Vote)
Sunday 8.00 PM (EAT)	6	Tetemesha	Kenya	Dance group					Eliminated

Non-competition performances

Performer	Origin	Act
Serro	Kenya	Singer

=== Semi-finals 3 (September 29) ===
Guest Performer, Results Show: Bruce Melodie

Time	Order	Semi-Finalist	Origin	Act	Buzzes and Judges choice				Result 10.00pm
Time	Order	Semi-Finalist	Origin	Act	Gaetano	Makeda	Vanessa	Jeff	Result 10.00pm
Sunday 8.00 Pm (EAT)	1	Jua Kali Drummers	Kenya	Drummers					Eliminated
Sunday 8.00 Pm (EAT)	2	Peace	Rwanda	Singer					Eliminated (Lost Judges' Vote)
Sunday 8.00 Pm (EAT)	3	DNA	Uganda	Comic Dancers					Advanced (Public Vote)
Sunday 8.00 Pm (EAT)	4	Sinaubi	Tanzania	Instrumentalist					Eliminated
Sunday 8.00 Pm (EAT)	5	Spell Cast	Kenya	Singers(Group)					Advanced (Won Judges' Vote)
Sunday 8.00 Pm (EAT)	6	Makorokocho	Tanzania	Dance group					Eliminated

Participant	Origin	Act
Bruce Melodie	Rwanda	Singer

== Final ==
=== Finale (October 6) ===
The Finale was filmed live at Catholic University of Eastern Africa.

Winner | Runner-up

6 acts had to step up their game and battle it out for the grand prize of $50,000.

Guest Performer, Results Show: Ommy Dimpoz.

Time	Order	Finalist	Country	Description	Buzzes and Judges choice				Result
Time	Order	Finalist	Country	Description	Gaetano	Makeda	Vanessa	Jeff	Result
Sunday 7.30 Pm (EAT)	1	Spell Cast	Kenya	Singers(group)					Finalist
Sunday 7.30 Pm (EAT)	2	Intayoberana	Rwanda	Cultural dance					2nd
Sunday 7.30 Pm (EAT)	3	Jannell Tamara	Kenya	Singer					Finalist
Sunday 7.30 Pm (EAT)	4	DNA	Uganda	Comic dance					Finalist
Sunday 7.30 Pm (EAT)	5	Esther & Ezekiel	Uganda	Singers(duo)					1st
Sunday 7.30 Pm (EAT)	6	Jehovah Shalom A capella	Uganda	A capella group					Finalist

Participant	Origin	Act
Ommy Dimpoz	Tanzania	Singer

== Awards ==
The winners won $50,000, c. KES 5,000,000.

== Controversy ==
Concerns were raised about the Burundian drummers not coming from the four participating countries namely Uganda, Rwanda, Kenya and Tanzania. The producers of the show released a statement clarifying that the group members were legal residents of Rwanda and had all the rights to participate as participation was open to anyone from the four countries.
