= Liz Bingham =

British businessman

- Occupation: Businessman

Elizabeth Anne Bingham OBE is a British businesswoman and president of R3, the industry body for restructuring professionals.

A managing partner at EY (Ernst and Young), she joined the firm in 1986 having previously worked at BDO Stoy Hayward.

She is a leading campaigner for diversity in the workplace for which she has been named a Stonewall Role Model. She was appointed Officer of the Order of the British Empire (OBE) in the 2015 New Year Honours for services to equality in the workplace.

== Awards ==
She has an Honorary Doctorate of Business Administration from BPP University and an Honorary Doctorate of Laws from the University of Bath.

Other awards she has received include:

- 2012 award for achievement from Women in Banking & Finance
- 2012 ranked 31 in the World Pride Power List of influential LGBT people worldwide
- 2013 ranked 27 by Accountancy Age in the Financial Power List
- 2013 named in the BBC Radio 4 Woman's Hour 100 Power List
- 2013 one of Cranfield's 100 Women to Watch list.
- 2014 ranked 18 in the FT Top 50 Outstanding in Business List.

In April 2014, she was a judge in the BBC Woman's Hour power list 2014.
