= Mbiyu Koinange =

Kenyan politician

Hon. Mbiyū Koinange

Member of Parliament
- In office 1963–1979
- Succeeded by: Njenga Karume
- Constituency: Kiambaa

Personal details
- Born: Mbiyū wa Koinange; 1907 Kiambaa, Kikuyu District, East Africa Protectorate
- Died: 3 September 1981 (aged 73–74) Nairobi, Kenya
- Resting place: Kiambaa, Kiambu
- Party: Kenya African National Union (KANU)
- Education: London School of Economics, University of Cambridge (St. John's College), Columbia University, Ohio Wesleyan University, Hampton Institute, Alliance High School
- Cabinet: Jomo Kenyatta

Peter Mbiyū Koinange (1907 – 3 September 1981) was a politician from Kenya. He served in the government and cabinet of Jomo Kenyatta, Kenya's first president, for 16 years. During this time, he held the post of member of parliament for the Kiambaa Constituency and the portfolios of Minister of State for Education, External Affairs, Pan-African Affairs, as well as Minister of State in the Office of the President.

== Family ==
Born Mbiyū wa Koinange in 1907 in Njunu, Kiambu District he was the eldest son of Koinange Wa Mbiyu, a prominent Kikuyu chief during Kenya's colonial period, and Wairimu, the chief's great wife. He was one of seven children, with another six siblings who died either at birth or early on in their childhood. His elder sister, Isabella, was one of Kenya's first trained African nurses, while his younger brother, Charles Karuga Koinange, served as a colonial chief and was a civil servant in independent Kenya for more than 30 years. He was also brother to Grace Wanjiku, Jomo Kenyatta's third wife.

== Education ==
Mbiyū Koinange last studied in the Alliance High School, then the only secondary school open to Africans but which offered mainly religious and vocational education and moved to the United States in 1927 for studying. He attended Hampton Institute in Virginia, where he graduated in 1931. Koinange then started at Ohio Wesleyan University in Delaware, Ohio in 1931, completing a four-year bachelor's degree in 1935. From Ohio, Koinange then received a one-year postgraduate certificate in education from Columbia University in 1936. Mbiyu Koinange then spent a year at the University of Cambridge, St. John's College as a Rhodes Scholar, followed by a year at the University of London Institute of Education before returning to Kenya in 1939. He was the first Kenyan African to hold a postgraduate degree.

== Early career ==
Upon his return to Kenya and in consultation with his father, Koinange Wa Mbiyu, Mbiyū Koinange decided to create an African-run, community owned college, modelled on his alma mater Hampton Institute and on Tuskegee University. Mbiyū Koinange was the principal of this Kenya Teachers College situated at Githunguri, the site of the first independent elementary school founded by Musa Ndirangū. The KTC's objective was to train teachers for the Kikuyu Independent Schools Association (KISA) and the Kikuyu Karinga Education Authority (KKEA), founded in 1929, and to increase their independence from missionary training centres.

In 1952, just as a state of emergency was decreed in Kenya and the Kapenguria Six and many others, notably associated with the KTC, were arrested, Mbiyū Koinange was in England representing the Kenya African Union, thus narrowly escaping arrest himself. Following the proscription of the KISA and KKEA schools in late 1952, Mbiyu Koinange remained in England, returning ten years later as the secretary of the Pan-African Freedom Movement for East, Central and South Africa.

== Political career ==
He was the Kiambaa Constituency MP from 1963 to 1979 when Njenga Karume was elected the Kiambaa MP. During this 16-year tenure, Mbiyu Koinange served in several roles including Minister of State for Pan-African Affairs, Minister for Foreign Affairs, Minister of Education. For the majority of his tenure, Peter Mbiyu served as Minister of State in the Office of the President (1966–79).

== Publications ==
- The People of Kenya Speak for Themselves (1955), Detroit: Kenya Publishing House

This book was endorsed by C. L. R. James, Grace Lee Boggs and Cornelius Castoriadis in their book Facing Reality
