= Charles Karuga Koinange =

Kenyan politician (1920–2004)

- Born: 1920
- Died: 2004 (aged 83–84)
- Occupations: Colonial Chief, District Commissioner, Provincial Commissioner
- Years active: 1951–1980
- Known for: Administration during colonial and post-independence Kenya
- Father: Koinange Wa Mbiyu

Charles Karuga Koinange (1920-2004), the son of a prominent colonial Kikuyu chief, served as key colonial chief in Central Kenya during the 1950s. After Kenya's independence in 1963, Charles Karuga served as a District Commissioner and Provincial Commissioner in the independent Republic of Kenya. As a leading member of the prominent Koinange family, Charles Karuga Koinange held a prominent role in late colonial developments in Central Kenya, as well as politics in Central Kenya following Kenya's independence.

== Family ==
Charles Karuga Koinange was the second son of Koinange Wa Mbiyu, a leading colonial African chief among the Kikuyu people of Central Kenya.

== Career ==
Charles Karuga Koinange civil service career began in 1951 and ended in 1980. Beginning as an assistant to local chiefs in 1951, he then served as chief of the Kiambaa District from 1955 until 1961. This district had formerly been overseen by his father, Koinange Wa Mbiyu, from c. 1920 to 1939. During Charles Karuga's tenure as chief, his father was detained, first in Marsabit and then in Kapenguria as, according to the colonial government, a leader of the Mau Mau Rebellion of the early 1950s. Charles then served a short stint as an African Administrative Officer from 1961-1963, before moving on to serve as District Commissioner of Muranga and Nyeri Districts. His final administrative posts, which he began in 1967, as Provincial Commissioner of the Central Province and Eastern Provinces of Kenya.

In the early 1980s, Charles Karuga served as chairman of the Kenya Tea Development Authority.
