= Koinange Street =

Street in Nairobi, Kenya

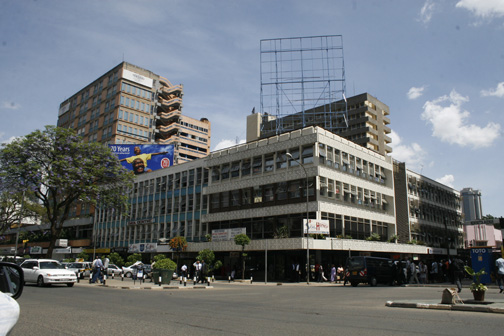
- The junction of Koinange Street and Kenyatta Avenue
- Interactive map of Koinange Street
- Former names: Sadler Street; (to 1964)
- Namesake: Koinange Wa Mbiyu
- Type: Street
- Location: Nairobi CBD
- Coordinates: 1°17′01″S 36°49′07″E
- Northwestern end: University Way
- Major junctions: Kenyatta Avenue
- Southeastern end: Kaunda Street

Other
- Known for: Red-light district

Koinange Street is a busy street in the city of Nairobi, Kenya. In colonial times it was named Sadler Street after an early governor, James Hayes Sadler. In 1964, it was renamed after Koinange Wa Mbiyu.

It is a major red-light district despite prostitution in Kenya being illegal.

Koinange Street is the street in Nairobi Central Business District with the highest number of banks along one street.
