= Jeff Koinange =

Kenyan journalist (born 1966)

- Born: Jeff Mwaūra Koinange; 7 January 1966 (age 60); Kenya
- Citizenship: Kenyan
- Education: Kingsborough Community College, New York University
- Occupations: Journalist and talk-show host
- Notable work: Jeff Koinange Live
- Spouse: Shaila Koinange ,1998
- Relatives: Koinange Wa Mbiyu (grandfather)

Jeff Mwaūra Koinange MBS (born 7 January 1966) is a Kenyan journalist and host of Jeff Koinange Live, a talk show on Citizen TV since February 2017. He was also a radio host, alongside Patrick Igunza, on the evening show at HOT 96, the English-language station owned by Royal Media Services. He was a judge representing Kenya at the new East Africa's Got Talent, which premiered on 4 August 2019. He served as the Africa correspondent for CNN and CNN International from 2001 to 2007, and later as chief reporter at TV station K24 from 2007 to December 2012. Before joining KTN, he worked with KTN on his branded news programme, Jeff Koinange Live. He had earlier served as the chief anchor Africa for Arise Television Ltd based in Johannesburg. He joined East Africa's Got Talent as a judge alongside Gaetano Kagwa, Makeda Mahadeo and Vanessa Mdee.

== Early life and career ==
Koinange was born in Kenya, He was one of the grandsons of Koinange Wa Mbiyu. Between 1987 and 1989, he attended Kingsborough Community College in Brooklyn, New York, and graduated with an associate degree. He also received a Bachelor of Arts degree in broadcast journalism from New York University.

Prior to joining CNN, Koinange worked for Reuters Television from 1995 to 2001, covering Africa and serving as their chief producer from 1999 to 2001. He also worked as a producer at NBC News in 1994 and earlier worked for ABC News, from 1991 to 1992. He married his second wife, Shaila Koinange, in 1998 and has one child, Jamal Mbiyu Koinange.

=== CNN career ===
Included among the more significant stories Koinange has covered for CNN in Africa were the crisis in Darfur, the civil wars in Liberia and Sierra Leone and the famine in Niger, for which he won an Emmy Award.

In early 2007, Koinange was reprimanded by the government of Nigeria for his coverage of the Movement for the Emancipation of the Niger Delta (MEND). In his report, Koinange accompanied masked MEND guerillas to a camp where they were holding a number of Filipino hostages. The Nigerian government said that the report was "staged," a charge CNN denied.

He has also covered news outside of Africa, including extensive reporting on the aftermath of the Hurricane Katrina crisis in the US and the Iraq War.

On 29 May 2007, CNN announced that Koinange was no longer employed by the network.

=== Post-CNN career ===
Seven months after leaving CNN, Koinange was hired as a news anchor by a new Kenyan TV station, K24, which began test transmissions in Nairobi in December 2007. He was the host of Capital Talk Show, where he won a Kalasha Award for Best TV Host at the 2nd Kalasha International Film & TV Awards. He now hosts 'Jeff Koinange Live', a talk show aired on Citizen TV Kenya, part of Royal Media Services and a prime news anchor for the same station. He has an Instagram page and has featured fellow workmates, including MC Azeezah Hashim.

=== Book: Through my African eyes ===
In his autobiography, Through My African Eyes, published in 2014 by the Footprints Press Kenya, Koinange describes his school days and his career climb to be one of Africa's most recognised journalists.

=== Philanthropy and community work ===
In 2017, he began an initiative to develop and stock a library in the Kibera slums where students from the neighborhood can gain access to reading material. He has also done notable speaking engagements, such as at the Journalism In Africa forum, organised by a community organisation called Fatuma's Voice in 2016.

== Music ==
Koinange is a country music lover and appeared with Kenyan singer Sir Elvis at the Country Roads event at Thika Greens Golf Resort in September 2019. Koinange had previously appeared with Sir Elvis at other events.
