= Richard Lusimbo =

Ugandan LGBT rights activist (born 1986)

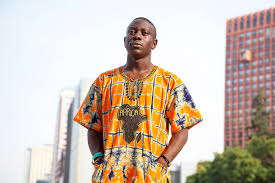
Portrait of Richard Lusimbo taken in Mexico City at the ILGA World Conference 2014.

Richard Lusimbo (born 1986) is a Ugandan LGBT activist, documentary filmmaker, and public speaker who gained international attention when he was outed in a Ugandan tabloid newspaper for being gay.

He serves as the Research and Documentation Officer at Sexual Minorities Uganda, and has appeared in New York Times, The Washington Post, CNN, The Advocate, The Guardian, among others.

== Activism ==
In August 2011, Lusimbo began volunteering at Sexual Minorities Uganda (SMUG), Uganda's umbrella LGBTI organisation. There he was called upon to convince an LGBTI health conference, supported by the International HIV/AIDS Alliance Uganda. For the first time, Lusimbo was actively involved in the Ugandan LGBTI community, working as the Executive Assistant to Frank Mugisha, the executive director of SMUG. In 2012 Lusimbo was hired as the Research and Documentation Officer at SMUG. There he began documentation of human rights abuses experienced by the LGBTI community in Uganda, production of policy reports to highlight cases and recommendations for action by civil society and the state to ensure the health and rights of LGBTI persons.

In 2012 he also became the Chair of African Research Team for Envisioning Global LGBT Human Rights, and began production of a documentary on the anti-homosexuality movement in Uganda. This gave Lusimbo an opportunity to travel across the country to speak with LGBTI persons on a personal level. Not long after beginning work at SMUG, in 2013, Lusimbo was outed in a local tabloid, "Red Pepper," along with other staff of SMUG. Later, his photo appeared along with his address on a Ugandan Facebook campaign to attack LGBTI Ugandans. Lusimbo had to leave his home and stay with a friend, and later leave the country for a month and stay in the United States. While in the U.S., Lusimbo used this as an opportunity to share his story and of other Ugandan LGBTI persons. He gave speeches at the University of Vermont, and University of Rochester, and State University of New York at Geneseo. In April 2013, Lusimbo returned to Uganda and continued work at SMUG, until the Anti-Homosexuality Bill passed through parliament in December 2013.

Again in 2014, after the Anti-Homosexuality Act was signed into law by Ugandan President Museveni, Lusimbo was outed on the cover of the popular local tabloid, "Red Pepper," with the headline "Top Gays Speak Out: How I Became Homosexual." This brought a lot of fear. Lusimbo received many threats, hate mail on his phone and social media forcing him into hiding.

In May 2014, Lusimbo became the Country Coordinator for REAct (Rights, Evidence, Action). He worked as a consultant to train on the human rights and monitoring system, including human rights theory, questionnaire adaptation, interviewing skills and the use of MARTUS to record cases. Part of team that developed and pilot-tested REAct. Consultancies successfully completed with the International HIV/AIDS Alliance and Gays and Lesbians of Zimbabwe (GALZ), AIDS Legal Network (ALN), Community Health Alliance Uganda (CHAU).

In 2015, Lusimbo premiered his documentary Film, "And Still We Rise" in Kampala, Uganda. The film documents the resistance and resilience of Ugandan LGBTI persons throughout the Anti-homosexuality movement. The documentary is a form of participatory film-making and was created by people in the midst of the struggle against the Anti-Homosexuality Bill in Uganda.

Lusimbo has continued to serve his community in different forms. This includes the, International Planning Board of the Planning Conference, Miami Out Games, Coordinator of Pride Uganda 2015, Co-chair Alternate of the 2014–2016 Pan-African ILGA Board, Co-Secretary General Alternate of the ILGA World Board 2014–2016, Advisor to Benetech the designers of MARTUS software used for REAct, board member, Transgender Equality Uganda from 2012 until 2015, and Boardchair from 2015 until present.

Further, Lusimbo lead the Ugandan delegation to the United States in the Sexual Minorities Uganda v. Scott Lively case in 2013. Lusimbo. Lively is perhaps the most infamous example of Christian leaders involved in the Anti-Homosexuality movement in Uganda, and is being sued by SMUG in a U.S. Federal Court for crimes against humanity after he came to Uganda and took part in the drafting of the Anti-Homosexuality Act. Lusimbo has served as a witness in the case, and gave a deposition in 2015.

== See also ==
- Geoffrey Ogwaro
