= Koinange Wa Mbiyu =

Kikuyu chief and Mau Mau independence figure

Senior Chief Koinange wa Mbiyū
- Born: Njunu-wa-Mbiyu (also known as Gathecha) c. 1865; Kiambaa, Kiambu, British East Africa
- Died: 20 July 1960; Kiambaa, Kiambu, Kenya
- Known for: Senior Chief of Kiambu District; land rights advocate; supporter of the Mau Mau independence movement; founder of Githunguri Teachers College
- Spouse(s): Mariamu Wambui, Julia Njeri, Joyce Kagendo, Phylis Wambui, Elizabeth Gathoni, Beatrice Gata
- Children: 34, including Mbiyu Koinange, Charles Karuga Koinange, Frederick Mbiyu Koinange, John Karuga Koinange

Koinange wa Mbiyū (c. 1865 – 20 July 1960) was a senior Kikuyu chief in colonial Kenya and one of the most influential African political figures in Kiambu District during the colonial era. Born into the wealthy Njunu clan of Kiambu, he rose through the colonial administrative ranks while simultaneously advocating for Kikuyu land rights, African education, and ultimately the independence struggle. Although he never learnt to read or write, he was widely regarded as one of the most articulate and politically astute African leaders of his generation.

== Early life and background ==
Koinange was born around 1865 in the Kiambu area of what is today Central Kenya. He was born with the names Njunu-wa-Mbiyu or Gathecha; the name Koinange, meaning "to break" in Kikuyu, was the name by which he became widely known.

== Colonial administrative career ==
Koinange was appointed "headman" by the colonial administration in 1921, and Senior Chief of Kiambu District in 1938. By 1942 he was Senior Chief without location, serving as an adviser on African affairs to the District Commissioner, who once described him as "the evil genius of Kiambu".

He retired in February 1949 as Senior Chief but remained active, retaining the role of African deputy vice-president of the Kiambu Local Native Council. At the time of his detention in 1952, he held approximately 600 acres of land across Kiambaa and surrounding areas of Kiambu, which supported his six wives, 34 children and extended household.

== Land rights advocacy ==
Koinange was a persistent defender of Kikuyu land rights against colonial encroachment. As early as 1914, he submitted the first written complaint against land alienation to the colonial government. He also fought for the right of Kikuyu farmers to grow coffee, a cash crop the colonial government had reserved exclusively for white settlers.

== Education ==
Despite being illiterate himself, Koinange was one of the most ardent advocates for African education in colonial Kenya. In 1927, he sent his eldest son Mbiyu Koinange to the United States — making him one of the first Kenyans to be educated in America — where Mbiyu attended Hampton Institute in Virginia, Ohio Wesleyan University (earning a Bachelor of Arts), and Columbia University (where he became the first Kenyan to earn a Master of Arts degree).

Working in partnership with his son, Koinange was instrumental in establishing the Kenya Teachers Training College at Githunguri in 1939. The college was an African-run, community-owned institution whose objective was to train teachers for the Kikuyu Independent Schools Association (KISA) and the Kikuyu Karinga Education Authority (KKEA), reducing African dependence on missionary-controlled education. When Jomo Kenyatta returned to Kenya from England in 1946, Koinange appointed him vice-principal of the college; Kenyatta later became its principal in 1947.

Koinange also pushed for a government high school in Kiambu District. When the colonial government failed to act, he became a key figure in establishing the Kikuyu Independent Schools movement — an act of institutional defiance that resulted in his dismissal from government favour, though the colonial administration allowed him to retain his Senior Chief title.

== Connection to Jomo Kenyatta ==
To seal a growing political and personal alliance between the Koinange family and Kenyatta, Senior Chief Koinange arranged for Kenyatta to marry his daughter Grace Wanjiku, making Mbiyu Koinange Kenyatta's brother-in-law. Grace Wanjiku later died in 1950 while giving birth to Jane Wambui.

== Role in the Mau Mau independence struggle ==
Koinange has often been mischaracterised as a colonial collaborator. A more accurate reading, presented in Jeff Koinange's 2000 biography Koinange-wa-Mbiyu: Mau Mau's Misunderstood Leader, portrays him as a strategic patriot who worked within colonial structures while covertly advancing the independence struggle.

From as early as 1945, Koinange began mobilising the Kikuyu community to raise funds and collect weapons in support of the emerging resistance. His homestead at Kiambaa became one of the most important nerve centres of Mau Mau organisation. Due to its proximity to Nairobi, the compound served as both a meeting place for independence strategists and an oath-taking centre for new recruits. He made his home available for meetings and was involved in providing support for the Mau Mau.

== Detention and death ==
In 1952, with the declaration of the State of Emergency in Kenya, Koinange — then approximately 87 years of age — was arrested and detained. Kenya Law courts characterised his detention as resistance to "colonial exploitation of land in the Central Province of Kenya." He was held first in Marsabit and subsequently in Kapenguria. Several of his wives and sons were also detained alongside him, and his approximately 600 acres of family land was seized or left unmanaged during his near-decade of detention.

He was released on 1 July 1960, by which time he was approximately 95 years old and severely weakened. He died nineteen days later, on 20 July 1960, at Kiambaa in Kiambu District.

Letters of administration for his estate were issued by the High Court of Kenya on 19 June 1967 (Administration Cause No. 186/67), seven years after his death, reflecting the complexity of settling an estate disrupted by nearly a decade of colonial detention and land seizure.

== Legacy and family ==
Koinange had six wives — Mariamu Wambui, Julia Njeri, Joyce Kagendo, Phylis Wambui, Elizabeth Gathoni and Beatrice Gata — and 34 children. His descendants became some of the most prominent figures in independent Kenya:

- Mbiyu Koinange (Peter Mbiyu Koinange, 1907–1981) — eldest son; served as Minister of State in the Office of President Jomo Kenyatta and is regarded as one of the most powerful political figures of the early independence era.
- John Karuga Koinange — Senator for Kiambaa in Kenya's first bicameral National Assembly, 1963–1966.
- Frederick Mbiyu Koinange — first African Kenyan to open a car dealership (1948) and opened the Koinange Petrol Station in Kariokor in 1966, the first indigenous petrol station in Kenya.
- Jeff Koinange — renowned television journalist and talk show host; grandson of Koinange wa Mbiyu and author of Koinange-wa-Mbiyu: Mau Mau's Misunderstood Leader (2000).
- Lilian Wairimu Koinange — wife of Anglican Bishop Obadiah Kariuki and mother of Justice Paul Kihara Kariuki.

Koinange Street, one of the most prominent streets in the Nairobi central business district, is named in the family's honour.
