= Clare Byarugaba =

Ugandan LGBT activist in Kampala

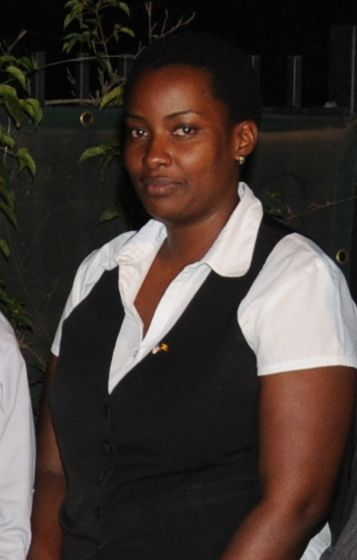
- Born: Clare Byarugaba; Southwestern Uganda
- Occupation: LGBT rights activist
- Years active: 2010s–present
- Organization(s): Civil Society Coalition on Human Rights and Constitutional Law
- Known for: LGBT rights advocacy in Uganda; Civil Society Coalition on Human Rights and Constitutional Law
- Notable work: Co-coordinator, advocacy for LGBT rights in Uganda
- Awards: Oak Fellow (Oak Institute for the Study of International Human Rights, Colby College, 2014)

Clare Byarugaba is a Ugandan LGBT activist in Kampala who has spoken out against the government's anti-LGBT rhetoric. She is the co-coordinator of the Civil Society Coalition on Human Rights and Constitutional Law.

== Career ==
In 2013, Byarugaba was set to start a Kampala chapter of PFLAG to support relatives of LGBT persons in a country whose president banned homosexuality. After this ban, she was outed by a national tabloid that put her face on its cover, threatening her life. In 2014, Byarugaba joined the Women in the World summit to share her personal story through the organization's mission to give women voice and agency. Byarugaba was the 2014 Oak Fellow with the Oak Institute for the Study of International Human Rights at Colby College.

== Personal life ==
Byarugaba was born and raised in southwestern Uganda. When President Yoweri Museveni banned homosexuality in Uganda, Byarugaba's mother threatened to turn her into the police for being a lesbian.
