= Banana Hill =

Town in Kiambu County, Kenya

Coordinates: 1°10′40.0″S 36°45′20.6″E

Banana Hill is a suburb of Karuri town, in the eastern part of Kiambu County, Kenya. Banana Hill's population constitutes 20 percent of the estimated 100,000 residents within Kiambaa Constituency.

The town is situated 2,000 m above sea level, approximately 20 km north of Nairobi. From there, it can be reached via Limuru Road by Runda Estate. It is approachable from an alternate route, the Limuru, Kiambaa/Kiambu and Ndenderu/Redhill all-weather roads. Banana Hill comprises small estates named Banana town, Mombasa, Gacorui, Ndunyu, Miberethi Inana ('Eight Pipes'), and Thimbigwa.

Its location in the temperate Kenyan Highlands is thought to have been one of the major attractions for its former British colonizers. The area receives an average annual rainfall of 790 mm (31 in) with average temperatures ranging from 48–84 °F in January and 45–79 °F in July. Most mornings and evenings are chilly.

== History ==
Banana Hills was so-named by British colonial soldiers, locally known as johnnies, who could only see banana plantations as they looked downhill towards the capital city, Nairobi, whenever they drove their military trucks over the hills en route to Limuru. The green scenery has been replaced with mushroomed red mansion rooftops as the city of Nairobi spread north.

== Landmarks and other features ==
Coffee farming has been an important revenue source for the Banana Hill area, but has been on the decline as many land owners opt to resort to real-estate and building rentals where global prices for coffee have been in decline. The area is also known for dairy farming; and for horticulture, such as small-scale flower growing, from which a number of families have made livelihoods.

=== Banana Hill Art Studio ===
Banana Hill has world renown as a locale where multiple contemporary artists, The Banana Hill Artists, display and sell their work at the famed Banana Hill Art Studio (see photo). The work-cum-gallery setting was an idea originated by twelve artists in 1992, and has steadily grown into a representation site for the work of nearly four dozen artists.

=== Banks, health centre, police station, and post office ===
- Banana Hill features branches of Family Bank Limited (FBL), Postbank, and Kenya Women Finance Trust Ltd. (KWFT), a microfinancing institution.
- Karuri Health Centre is one of the oldest medical centres in the country. It provides outpatient services to area residents, has an 18-bed capacity; and offers maternity services.

Anthem healthcare providing speciality clinic services and radiology solutions. Optician services Echocardiogram, ECG and eye clinic also available at Anthem healthcare.

- Karuri Police Station
- Karuri Post office serves the following areas: Nairobi North – Kangemi, Kikuyu, Githunguri, Nazareth, Limuru, and the Postal Corporation of Kenya, Karuri.

=== Churches, faiths, and denominations ===
The oldest churches of the Banana Hill area were based on Protestant (primarily Anglican) and Catholic faiths. The major churches of Banana Hill are St. Martin de Porres Catholic Church, Karuri; and member churches of the ACK (Anglican Church of Kenya), such as ACK Emmanuel Church Karuri, ACK Thimbigwa Church, and ACK Banana Hill Church and Restoration victory Ministries International. Within the recent past, many other churches of different denominations have sprung up.

=== Schools in and near Banana Hill ===
- Primary (elementary) schools in the area include Karuri Primary School, Kiambaa Primary School, Msingi Bora Academy; Muthurwa Primary School, Thimbigwa Primary School, and Kibathi Primary School.
- Secondary (high) schools include Karuri High School, Muthurwa High School, Senior Chief Koinange High School; and off Banana-Kiambu Road in Kiambaa, Kiambu District—Banana Hill High School, a private secondary school offering French-language coursework.
- A nearby postsecondary school is Banana Hill Technical Training Institute, in Karuri town.

=== Commerce ===
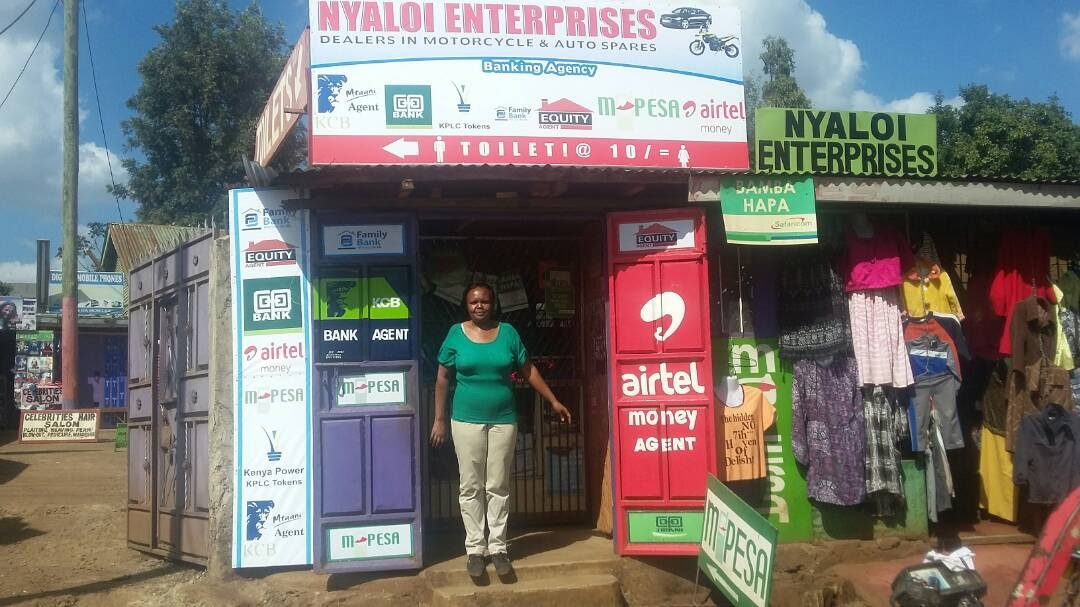
Nyaloi

Banana Hill has recently acquired its own identity as a significant shopping district in Kiambaa Division. It has also become an important transport exchange point. The town has hair salons, hardware stores, supermarkets, a good number of entertainment spots; and hosts a number of internet cafes. It also has a large market where farm produce and clothing items are bought and sold; and a large open-air market operating only on Mondays and Thursdays.

== Ethnic makeup ==
Banana Hill is a multi-ethnic, multi-racial town with a reputation for welcoming refugees fleeing from local and international conflict areas, amongst them: Uganda, Mozambique, and South Africa when it was under apartheid rule. It is rumored that Yoweri Museveni, President of Uganda sojourned in Banana Hill during his years in exile. The same has been rumored of the late John Garang, head of the Sudan People's Liberation Army/Movement, which spearheaded the July 9, 2011, founding of the Republic of South Sudan. Also families of prominent Ugandans like the Late Katunku Nicholas, late Kirya Balaki Kebba (Leader of Uganda Freedom Movement fighting group), Adok Nekyon (cousin brother of the late President Milton Obote), Air force Major Lutaya, Nampenda Philip, Muvule, and Wamusi Teddy all lived in Banana Hill from 1981-1985 when they went back to Uganda.

== Transit and transportation ==
Banana Hills is a major transit point for passengers traveling to Limuru, Kiambu, Wangige, Kikuyu town and other outlying areas. Matatu vehicles (simplified plural, matatus) are used as the primary means of commercial transportation. The matatu system relies on use of privately owned vehicles with assigned drives and touts, for which passengers are charged slightly higher fares than for bus travel. Matatus are, essentially, the strongest competition for bus transportation systems and taxi cabs outside of the capital city, and provide essential transportation for large numbers of commuters who work in the capital and large towns, but cannot afford ownership of vehicles. All vehicles used commercially for transportation of goods and passengers must be licensed.

== Prominent personalities from Banana Hill ==
- Geoffrey Gatama Geturo and Joseph Kamiru Gikubu, co-founders (with Geoffrey William Griffin) of Starehe Boys' Centre and School.
- James Njenga Karume, a long-time area representative in the Parliament of Kenya and a renowned Kenyan businessman.
- Captain John Kiniti, one of the first group of African pilots trained by the former East African Airways (EAA), alongside Captains Joe Gathecha, Philip Kandia, and the late Captain Michael Kinyanjui. During the dissolution of EAA, Captain Kiniti is credited with flying a Douglas DC-9 from Dar es Salaam to Nairobi, one of the aircraft that would be incorporated into the newly formed Kenya Airways fleet. Captain Kiniti joined Kenya Airways at its founding in January 1977 and served with distinction as a pilot and captain until his retirement in December 2015. Captain Kiniti is noted for his role during the transition from East African Airways to Kenya Airways. The dissolution of EAA resulted in the partition of its fleet and staff among Kenya, Tanzania, and Uganda, enabling the rapid formation of national airlines. Captain Kiniti was among the EAA-trained pilots who transitioned to Kenya Airways, helping maintain operational continuity during this period. He passed away on October 4, 2025 following an illness.
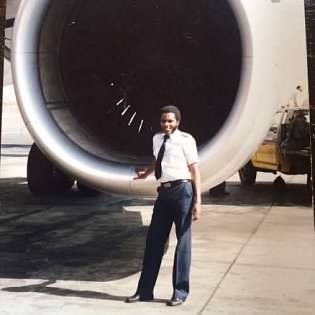
  Captain John Guy Kiniti
- Margaret Wangari, an evangelist, bishop, and faith healer who became pioneer of the Pentecostal movement in Banana Hill. She is founder of the Anointed Christian Fellowship, a ministry credited with the founding of many Pentecostal churches in the area and around the country.
- Mbiyu Gakuura, Kiambaa Senator in Kenya's pre-independence era.
- Mbiyu Koinange, son of the former famous colonial Senior Chief Koinange wa Mbiyu who was the Kiambaa Constituency representative in the Parliament of Kenya from 1963 to 1974. His fame is as a powerful government minister, and a very close confidante of Kenya's first president Jomo Kenyatta.
- Mungai Kimari, a Commonwealth Games medalist.
- Obadiah Kariuki, a bishop of Anglican Church of Kenya, Mount Kenya Diocese, who was among the first Africans to be ordained as a bishop in the then largely white-controlled Anglican church in post-colonial Kenya.
- Stanley Munga Githunguri, a successful businessman and former area MP (Member of Parliament).
