= Assassination of Waruhiu =

1952 murder in Gachie, Kenya

- Part of Mau Mau Uprising
- Location: Gachie, Kiambu Disctrict, Kenya Colony
- Date: October 7, 1952; 74 years ago
- Target: Chief Waruhiu
- Deaths: 1
- Perpetrator: Mau Mau rebels

On 7 October 1952, 'Chief Waruhiu (a senior tribal chief of the Kikuyu people) was murdered near Gachie, seven miles from Nairobi.

Waruhiu was a notable loyalist to the British administration in Kenya. He had grown up in poverty in a family of tenant farmers, and had survived the 1899 famine in Kenya with the help of the Gospel Missionary Society (GMS), an American Baptist society which had a mission in Kambui. Baptised by the Rev Willian Knapp (a Baptist minister born in Connecticut) in 1913, Waruhiu was a devout Christian (for instance refusing to eat meat slaughtered in accordance with Kikuyu custom) and became increasingly prominent in his locality. By 1922, he had been appointed as chief of the Ruiru location, a role in which he remained until his death. He concurrently acted as chief of the Githunguri division from 1930, and as chief of the Kiambu district from 1951 (in each case also until his death). Waruhiu was highly thought of by the colonial administration; in 1927 he was described by the British District Commissioner as "probably the most reliable official headman I have, as regards carrying out his duties", whilst another Commissioner noted in 1943 that Waruhiu was "serious-minded and sound in his ideas [...] executively outstandingly efficient". Waruhiu received a number of awards for his service, ultimately including the MBE, and was considered thoroughly loyal to the British authorities.

On 7 October 1952, near the town of Gachie, a location seven miles outside Nairobi, Waruhiu's car was stopped by three gunmen who shot him at point blank range. Waruhiu had publicly condemned the Mau Mau movement shortly before his death; Mau Mau had become increasingly notorious for violent murders of British colonists and loyalist Africans over the previous years. The authorities captured and tried 14 suspects for Waruhiu's murder, the majority affiliated in some way with Mau Mau. Of the 14, five were discharged by the magistrate for lack of evidence; three of the remaining nine were tried at the Supreme Court for Waruhiu's murder, and the remaining six for conspiracy to commit murder. The six who had been charged with conspiracy were all set free after the judge ruled that the sole prosecution witness was unreliable (though they were subsequently detained under the Emergency Regulations then in force across the colony as a result of Mau Mau). Of the three men charged with Waruhiu's murder, one was released whilst the remaining two (Gathuku wa Migwe and Waweru wa Kamundia) were found guilty and sentenced to death. Both men had confessed to the killing, though they later alleged that the confessions had been procured through torture.

At Waruhiu's funeral, mourners included the chief's family, various Kenyan leaders, thousands of Kikuyu tribesmen, and a number of dignitaries from the colonial administration. Governor Evelyn Baring called him "a great man, a great African and a great citizen of Kenya, who met his death in the service of his own people and his Government."
