= Karuri =

- Town Council
- Location within Kenya
- Coordinates: 0.73°S 37.05°E
- Country: Kenya
- County: Kiambu County

Population (2019)
  - Total: 194,342
- Time zone: UTC+3 (EAT)
- Climate: Cfb

Karuri is a town in Kiambu County. The town hosts a town council.

The Council borders the city of Nairobi to the south for about 20 km from Nairobi City, Kikuyu Town Council to the west, Limuru Municipal Council to the north and Kiambu Municipal Council to the east. It covers an area of 46 km^{2}. with a population of 194,342 (2019 census).

The council's main town, Karuri, was established as a meeting centre in the pre-colonial era where Kikuyu paramount chiefs would meet for deliberations. The town derives its name from the principal chief Karuri wa Gakure who would travel from Tuthu in the slopes of Aberdare Range to meet his counterparts like Kinyanjui wa Gathirimu.

== Economy ==
Proximity to the city of Nairobi and adequate transportation have attracted many people working in Nairobi and other neighbouring towns to the few urban centres within the town council in search of cheaper accommodation. In many circles, the Council has always been referred to as the "Dormitories" of Nairobi.

The town serves as the divisional headquarters for Kiambaa division, thereby boosting its growth. It was made an urban council in 1988 under Kiambu County Council with an area of 44.8 km2. The town council was upgraded into a township in 1997 with an area of 46 km2.

== Geography ==
The council falls in the Hinterland, which has fertile soils that are well drained. The council enjoys good climatic conditions as do most areas in Kenya's central region. The council lies in the east highlands of the Rift Valley, enjoying a moderate climate, and within a coffee-growing zone, although bordering a tea-growing zone.

Hills, plateaus and high-level structural plains that make it fairly easy for the development of road network characterize Karuri Town Council. The area does not have major rivers. The altitude ranges between 1500 and 1800 metres above sea level.

The soils are developed on undifferentiated tertiary volcanic and basic igneous rocks. They are well-drained, shallow, dark reddish brown though in some places they are imperfectly drained, very deep, dark gray to black, with calcareous, slightly saline deep sub-soil. They are of moderately high fertility. The crops that are grown are coffee, maize, horticultural crops, fruits and dairy farming.

Other physical features include steep slopes and valleys that are unsuitable for cultivation.

Rainfall regime around Karuri is bimodal, with long rains occurring between April and May while short rains fall from October to November. The average temperature, which is determined by altitude range from 20.4 degrees in the upper highland to 34 degrees in the lower midland.

== Administration ==
The council consists of four electoral wards:

- Kiambaa Ward
- Muchatha Ward
- Kihara / Gachie Ward
- Ndenderu / Ruaka Ward

The four wards elect one councillor each. The total number of councillors is six with one nominated councilor and an appointed public officer. All these wards are part of the Kiambaa Constituency.

== Demographics ==
According to the 1979 census the area had a population of 45,000. In the 1989, census the population had grown to 73,000, and 105,506 in the 1999 census. The population has been growing tremendously as a result of the influx of working-class people from Nairobi coming to look for cheaper and convenient accommodation in this township. Many people working in Nairobi reside in the periphery towns like Gachie, Kihara, Ruaka, Ndenderu, and Karuri. Market centres attract people because they offer business and employment opportunities.

The population growth rate around Karuri stands at 2.87%. The same growth rate has been used to compute the population projection of this council.

Population analysis per the LADP 2001 shows that women are more numerous than men, hence a high reproductive capacity. People aged between 0-44 comprise 83.6% of the total population. The population in this category is very needy in terms of social amenities, services and related infrastructure. This is the same population which contributes to the council's revenue; thus the council is embarking on investing adequately in terms of service provision.
