= Starehe =

Neighbourhood in Nairobi, Kenya

- Location of Starehe in Kenya
- Coordinates: 1°16′51″S 36°50′28″E
- Country: Kenya
- County: Nairobi City
- Sub-county: Starehe

Starehe is a neighbourhood in the city of Nairobi. It is approximately 2.6 kilometres (1.6 mi) east of the central business district of Nairobi. It is one of the oldest estates in Nairobi.

== Location ==
Starehe is located approximately 2.6 kilometres (1.6 mi) east of Nairobi's central business district. It is straddled by General Waruingi Road to the south and borders other neighbourhoods such as Kariokor, Pumwani and Ziwani.

== Overview ==
Starehe is one of Nairobi's oldest neighbourhoods, dating back to the 1920s. Built between 1942 and 1946, based on the design by Kenya Government architect Peter Dangerfield, Starehe provided for single-family houses and dormitories suitable for bachelors. Starehe was the second of the three estates in Nairobi to employ the garden city concept after Ziwani then Kaloleni. Land on the westerly parts of Starehe estate that was originally had housing units, is currently occupied by a secondary school: Starehe Boys' Centre and School. The piece of land set aside for establishment of a boys and girls' secondary school is occupied by the Pumwani Boys' High School.

Due to the housing deficit in the city of Nairobi, Starehe has in the recent years been earmarked for upgrade, with demolition of the old low-density houses to high-density, with over 5,000 affordable housing units.

Starehe Sub-county and Starehe Constituency names are borrowed from the estate. The sub-county is one of the eleven sub-counties of Nairobi City County. Created in 1966, the constituency is one of the seventeen constituencies in Nairobi. the electoral divisions covers the mainly the central and some southern parts of Nairobi. It has six electoral county assembly wards within it.

== Points of interest ==
1. Starehe Boys' Centre and School, a secondary school founded in 1959 in Starehe.
2. Pumwani Boys' High School, a secondary school next to Starehe Boys' Centre and School, bordering the Pumwani suburb.
