= Kiambaa Constituency =

Kenyan electoral constituency

Kiambaa
- constituency for the Parliament of Kenya
- Kiambaa Constituency within Kiambu County

- Kiambu County within Kenya
- County: Kiambu
- Population: 236,400
- Area: 91 km^{2} (35.1 sq mi)

Current constituency
- Number of members: 1
- Party: UDA
- Member of Parliament: John Njuguna Wanjiku
- Wards: 5

Kiambaa Constituency is an electoral constituency in Kenya. It is one of the twelve constituencies in Kiambu County. The constituency was established for the 1963 elections.

== Members of Parliament ==
Elections	MP	Party	Notes
1963	Mbiyu Koinange	KANU	
1969	Mbiyu Koinange	KANU	One-party system
1974	Mbiyu Koinange	KANU	One-party system
1979	Njenga Karume	KANU	One-party system
1983	Njenga Karume	KANU	One-party system.
1988	Njenga Karume	KANU	One-party system.
1992	J. Kamau Icharia	Ford-Asili	
1997	Njenga Karume	DP	
2002	Njenga Karume	KANU	
2007	Stanley Munga Githunguri	KANU	
2013	Paul Koinange	Jubilee Party	
2021	John Njuguna Wanjiku	UDA	
2022	John Njuguna Wanjiku	UDA	

== Locations and wards ==
Location	Population
Cianda	13,441
Kamiti	7,496
Kiambaa	44,859
Kiambaa Settled Area	18,337
Kihara	36,710
Ndumberi	20,396
Riabai	21,068
Ruaka	15,348
Ting'ang'a	14,290
Waguthu	21,363
Total	213,308
1999 census.

Ward	Registered Voters	Local Authority
Cianda	5,433	Kiambu county
Kanunga	6,033	Kiambu town
Kiambaa	14,155	Karuri town
Kihara	12,333	Karuri town
Kihingo	2,714	Kiambu town
Muchatha	8,712	Karuri town
Ndenderu	6,683	Karuri town
Ndumberi	6,818	Kiambu town
Riabai	2,826	Kiambu town
Technology	4,820	Kiambu town
Ting'ang'a	9,027	Kiambu county
Township	10,801	Kiambu town
Total	90,355	
*September 2005.
