= Ziwani, Nairobi =

Ziwani
- Location of Ziwani in Kenya
- Coordinates: 1°16′46″S 36°50′18″E
- Country: Kenya
- County: Nairobi City
- Sub-county: Starehe

Ziwani is a neighbourhood in the city of Nairobi. It is approximately 2.4 kilometres (1.5 mi) east of the central business district of Nairobi. It is one of the oldest estates in Nairobi.

== Location ==
Ziwani is located approximately 2.4 kilometres (1.5 mi) east of Nairobi's central business district. It is lies between General Waruingi Road, Quarry Road and borders, Starehe estate to the east.

== Overview ==
The original blueprint of the Ziwani estates dates back to 1939. Actualisation began later in 1940 making the estate as one of Nairobi's oldest neighbourhoods. Built in order to remedy the housing shortage in the city among government-employed Africans, Ziwani, Kaloleni and Starehe were to contain two-three thousands dwellings and two-three thousand residents each. Ziwani was the first native estate and was designed by municipal engineer G. Fletcher. Ziwani provided for a range of housing that corresponded to the varying income levels as well as family structures, though single-family houses were not included. The houses were uniquely characterized by indoor kitchens. Ziwani was the first of the three estates to employ the garden city concept followed by Starehe (1942) and Kaloleni (1943).

Due to the housing deficit in the city of Nairobi, Ziwani has in the recent years been earmarked for upgrade, with demolition of the old low-density houses to high-density, with over 5,000 affordable housing units.
