= Kaloleni =

Kaloleni may refer to

- Kaloleni, Tanzania, an administrative ward in the Arusha District of the Arusha Region of Tanzania
- Kaloleni, Kenya, a settlement in Kilifi County in Kenya
- Kaloleni, Nairobi, a suburb in the city of Nairobi in Kenya
- Kaloleni Constituency, an electoral constituency in Kenya, one of three constituencies in Kilifi County
