= Joseph Kamiru Gikubu =

Kenyan educator

Joseph Kamiru Gikubu (1934 – 8 May 2014) was a Kenyan educationist and co-founder of the Starehe Boys' Centre. He was also an active member of the Kenya Land and Freedom Army, also known as Mau Mau, during the struggle for independence against British colonists.

== Early life ==
Gikubu was born in 1934 in Kiambaa village, around Banana Hill, Kiambu, to Sara Wanjiku and Gikubu Karanja. He was born in a polygamous family and was the fourth born in a family of twenty.

He went to Independent School Muchatha, Kanunga Primary and later Riara Intermediate School.

Before he completed his primary school education, the Mau Mau uprising broke out and he joined the movement as a courier and errand boy. He later fled to the then Tanganyika after learning of his being sought for arrest by the colonial government. He was promptly arrested at the Kenyan border upon his return to Kenya and detained at the infamous Manyani Detention Camp. Due to his young age at the point of detention, in 1955 he was transferred to Wamumu Rehabilitation camp as a child prisoner, where he met Geoffrey Griffin, with whom he was later to co-found Starehe Boys' Centre & School.

== Starehe Boys’ Centre ==
Gikubu co-founded Starehe Boys' center and School with the late Dr. Geoffrey Griffin and the late Geoffrey Geturo. He worked closely with Geoffrey Griffin and Geoffrey Geturo in running Starehe and for 55 years, he has played an active role in shaping the education of Kenya's youth.

== Personal life ==
Gikubu married Gladys Mary Nduta in 1960 and together they had seven children: two boys and five girls. At his death, he was survived by several grandchildren.

== Death ==
Gikubu died on the morning of Thursday 8 May 2014 while on the way to a city hospital, after developing breathing difficulties. He was buried 15 May 2014 in Kiambu amid accolades from leaders and thousands of Kenyans. Former President Mwai Kibaki described the lateGikubu as a dedicated Kenyan who served without discrimination, saying:

“The sad news of the passing on ofGikubu brought forth memories of his dedication to the welfare of young Kenyans while serving at Starehe Centre. There is no doubt that he was a visionary leader,”

== Awards ==
Gikubu was awarded Moran of the Order of the Burning Spear and Head of State Commendation honors by the government of Kenya on December 12, 1987.
