= Njenga Karume =

Kenyan businessman and politician

Dr. Hon. James Njenga Karūme
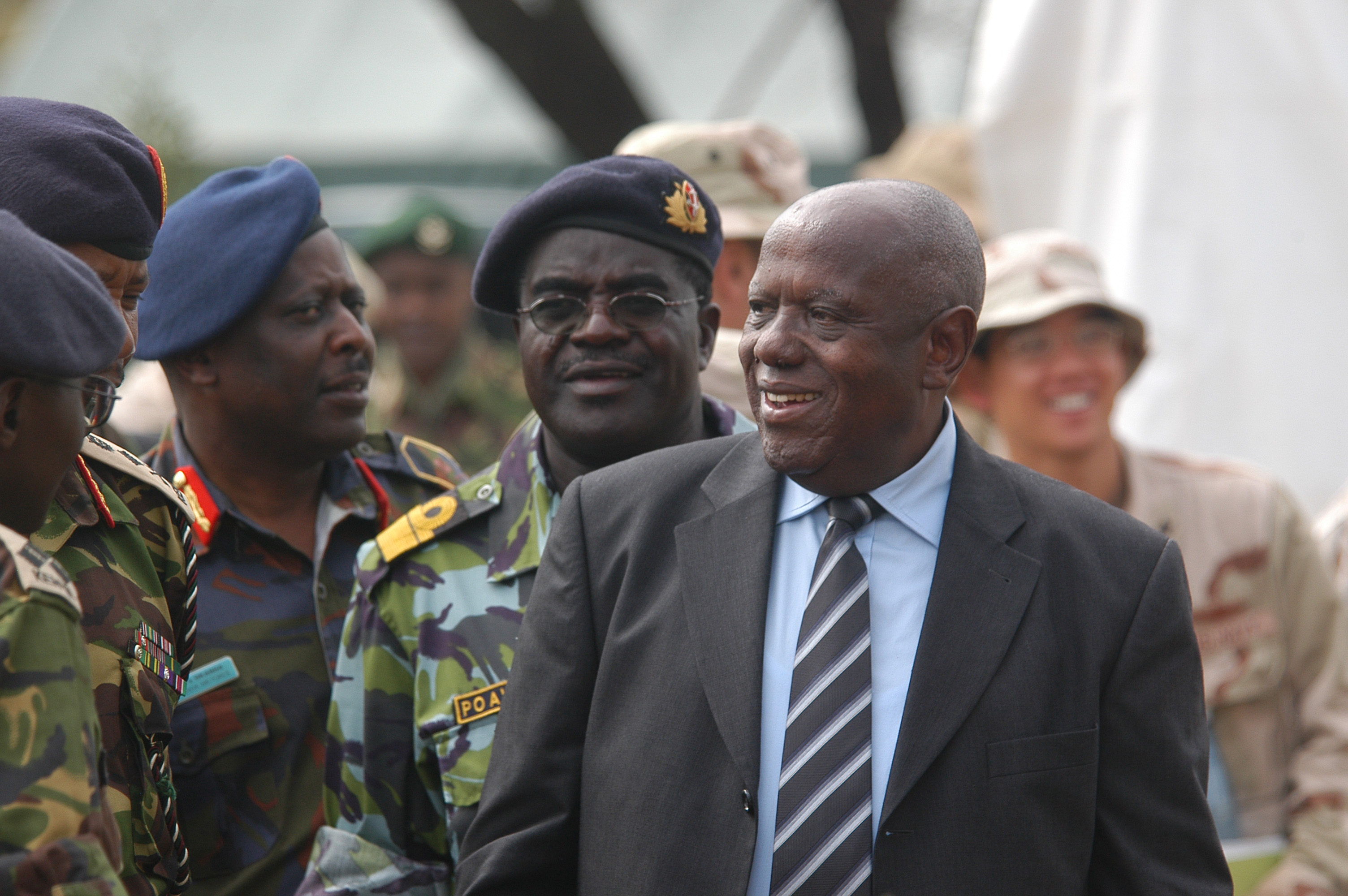
- In office 1974–2007
- President: Mwai Kibaki

Minister for Special Programs in the Office of the President
- In office June 2004 – December 2006
- President: Mwai Kibaki

Minister for State Defence
- In office 14 December 2005 – December 2007
- President: Mwai Kibaki
- Preceded by: Chris Murungaru
- Succeeded by: Mohamed Yusuf Haji

Member of Parliament for Kiambaa
- In office 1979–2007
- Preceded by: Mbiyu Koinange
- Succeeded by: Stanley Mūnga Githunguri

Personal details
- Born: 1929 Lake Elementaita, Nakuru District, Kenya
- Died: 24 February 2012 (aged 82–83) Karen Hospital, Nairobi, Kenya
- Citizenship: Kenyan
- Party: Kenya African National Union (1976–1991); Democratic Party (1991–2002); Kenya African National Union (2002–2007); Party of National Unity
- Spouse(s): Maryanne Wariara Njenga (m.1950– 14 March 2003); Margret Njeri Njenga (m.1960 – 4 February 1990); Grace Njoki Njenga (m. 21 February 2006 – 24 February 2012)
- Children: 10
- Education: Business Management Diploma, Kenya Institute of Management formerly Jeans School, Kenya
- Occupation: Founder, Chairman & CEO, Karume Trust Fund and Politician (MP for Kiambaa constituency)

James Njenga Karūme (1929 – 24 February 2012) was a Kenyan businessman and politician. He was born in Elementaita, Nakuru District.

== Early life ==
Njenga Karume was born in 1929 on Lord Delamare's Soysambu ranch in Elementaita. He was the eldest of 8 children of Joseph Karume (later changed to Karogo) and Teresia Njeri Karogo, who were indentured servants working for colonial white settlers. Njenga's amiable personality was always curious and deep. He had a strong relationship with his grandfather, with whom he spent most of his childhood days.

== Education ==
Because of the absence of schools for black Africans near Elementaita, Njenga attended school at the Kahuho-Karing'a Primary School in Ndeiya, Limuru at the beginning of 1942. Keen on pursuing further education, he proceeded to Riara in Kiambu after 3 years at Kahuho, but not before being baptized. Still pursueing his education back in Central Kenya, his parents moved to Elburgon where he later joined them and settled in Marioson Forest in 1944.

As expected in the Kikuyu culture, Njenga had reached the age at which he was expected to undergo circumcision and was then admitted to the (njata) STAR age group in 1947. Now considered a full grown man, equipped with some formal education and eager to fend for himself, Njenga decided to start his life and moved back to Rift Valley closer to his parents.

== Business ==
Karume's first business venture began in his school days where he went into the buying and selling of stationeries. His business was located inside the school premises with students as his target customers. His entrepreneurial skill eventually ran the school's tuck shop out of business.

After his education, Karume found a job doing clerical work on a farm. A few days before beginning work, he attended a rally between the white farm owners and the workers. In the heat of a debate, Njenga asked a question that upset the whites. He lost his job and from then on decided not to be employed.

He then started trading in charcoal. After failing to convince his friend, the late John Njenga, to join him, he continued on his own. He began saving what he earned in the charcoal business to finance his timber business.

Karūme held a diploma in business management from Jeans School (KIA). While Kenya was still under colonial rule, he formed a wholesale shop on Grogan Road (now Kirinyaga Road) in Nairobi. It was one of the few shops in Kenya operated by indigenous people.

Later he operated the Nararashi Distributors, which distributed the products of the Kenya Breweries Limited (KBL). Later Castle Brewing Kenya Limited, a Kenyan subsidiary of South African Breweries (SAB) was formed, with Karūme appointed its director. Karūme himself sought to distribute the products of both companies, but KBL was afraid of the competition and cancelled the distribution contract with Karūme. Karūme took the case to the court stating the cancellation of the contract was unfounded. The High Court first ordered KBL to pay KSh 231 million in damages (about US$2.9 million), but upon appeal the decision was overturned and Karūme was told to pay KBL for the suit. As a result, Karūme suffered severe financial losses. He continued to distribute Castle Beer for a while until SAB left Kenya, finally ending his transport business.

Before his death his business empire was valued at close to $200 million and includes the Jacaranda Group of Hotels under Jacaranda Holdings Limited, Karūme Holdings Limited and Cianda Holdings Limited. His empire is diversified into three main areas – hospitality, real estate and agriculture.

== Politics ==
Karūme joined politics in 1974 as a nominated Member of Parliament and in the three subsequent elections held in 1979, 1983 and 1988 Karūme vied for and won the Kiambaa constituency seat. Between 1979 and 1988 he served as an assistant minister.

Karūme was an active figure in the G.e.m.a. association. He was named chief and spokesman of the Gema communities. While Jomo Kenyatta was still the Kenyan president in 1976, Karūme joined a number of other politicians, including Kihika Kimani and Paul Ngei, forming the "Change the Constitution Movement" attempting to change the Constitution of Kenya such that then Vice-president Daniel arap Moi would not inherit the presidency upon Kenyatta's death. This was to prevent a non-Kikuyu president. The movement did not last long. Attorney-General Charles Njonjo charged Karume and other leader of the movement with treason, as "they had imagined the death of the sitting president", which was forbidden by the Penal Code. President Kenyatta dropped the charges, but at the same time silenced the movement.

At the National Delegates Conference in Kasarani in mid-1991 Karūme moved a motion to repeal Section 2A of the Kenyan Constitution – that is, restoration of the multi-party system. President Moi accepted the motion.

Karūme was reluctant to join the leading opposition force Forum for the Restoration of Democracy (FORD), foreseeing its split. Instead, he formed the Democratic Party (DP) with Mwai Kibaki and John Keen on 31 December 1991. At the 1992 elections Karūme ran on a DP ticket, but lost his seat to Kamau Icharia of FORD–Asili, whose presidential candidate Kenneth Matiba enjoyed higher popularity in his constituency.

He regained the parliamentary seat at the 1997 elections running again on DP ticket. For the 2002 Election he won the seat again, but now on KANU ticket, supporting their presidential candidate Uhuru Kenyatta, despite the long-standing friendship between him and presidential candidate Kibaki.

He won the seat also at the 2002 elections. In December 2006, when he was appointed the Minister of State for Defence. At the 2007 election he represented the PNU coalition led by President Kibaki, but lost the seat to Stanley Munga Githunguri of KANU.

In 2009 he released an autobiography titled 'Beyond Expectations: From Charcoal to Gold'.

== Personal life ==
He met his first wife Maryanne Wariara Njenga née Waireri in 1951. In 1952 they got married and had ten children Dr. Wanjìkū Kahiū, The late Joseph Karūme Njenga, Teresia Njeri Karūme, Lucy Wanjirū Karūme, The Late Jane Mūkuhì Matu, Nee Karūme, Henry Waireri Karūme, The late Kennedy Njoroge Karūme, Albert Kìgera Karūme, Samuel Wanjema Karūme.

He also married a second wife Margret Njeri Njenga in 1960 upon advice from his father in law that having two wives would help look after his empire.

On 21 February 2006, he married Grace Njoki and the couple had Emmanuel Karūme Njenga.

Karūme was also a personal friend and key political advisor to Kenyan presidents Jomo Kenyatta, Mwai Kibaki and Uhuru Kenyatta

== Death and legacy ==
Karūme had been having medical problems from late November 2011. He had been taken for chemotherapy treatment in India and returned on 1 January 2012 and was undergoing chemotherapy at the Aga Khan Hospital. He was preparing to go to Israel for further treatment but a few days before leaving he developed an infection. He was admitted to the Karen Hospital on 17 February 2012 in poor health and as the week went on his condition deteriorated. In the early hours of the morning on 24 February 2012, Njenga Karūme was pronounced dead due to a cardiac arrest. He died days after his close friend and political ally John Michuki.

Before he died he had formed the Njenga Karūme Trust which was designed to manage his inheritance. A board of trustees was chosen to manage these interests and it was led by George Ngūgi Waireri as the chairman who is brother-in-law and managing director or Standsand (Africa) Limited, a tea exporting company. Margaret Ndete his sister and who owns a successful chain of supermarkets, named Kamindi Selfridges, James Raymond Njenga who is his cousin and a retired businessman, his oldest living son Henry Waireri Karume who is a successful entrepreneur in the construction and supplies business, Kūng'ū Gatabaki a long time friend and is currently a chairman for Letshego he also appointed his Wife Grace Njoki Njenga as an overseer over his trust.
