= Kenyatta University =

Public university in Nairobi, Kenya

- Former names: Kenyatta College (1965–1975); Kenyatta University College (1975–1985)
- Motto: Elimu ni Nguvu
- Motto in English: "Education is strength"
- Type: Public
- Established: 1 September 1985; 41 years ago, as Kenyatta University
- Academic affiliations: ACU
- Chairman: Shem Migot-Adholla
- Chancellor: Amb. Francis K. Muthaura, EGH
- Vice-Chancellor: Paul Wainaina
- Faculty: 1,500+ (2016)
- Administrative staff: 3,500+ (2015)
- Students: 67,905 (2023)
- Location: Kahawa, Nairobi, Kenya; 1°10′59″S 36°55′34″E
- Campus: 1,000 acres (400 ha)+; 13 campuses
- Language: English
- Colors: Sky blue
- Mascots: Lion & elephant
- Website: www.ku.ac.ke

Kenyatta University (KU) is a public university with its main campus in Nairobi, Kenya. It acquired the status of university in 1985, being the third university after University of Nairobi (1970) and Moi University (1984). As of October 2014, it was one of 23 public universities in the country.

== Location ==
The main campus of Kenyatta University sits on over 1,000 acres (1.6 mi^{2}), at Kahawa, in the Kasarani Sub-county, north of Nairobi City County, approximately 17.5 kilometres (10.9 mi), by road, northeast of the central business district of Nairobi, the capital city of Kenya, off of the Nairobi-Thika Road.

The list of KU campuses includes the following locations:

- Main Campus - Kahawa, Nairobi
- Ruiru Campus - Ruiru
- Parklands Campus - Parklands
- Kitui Campus - Kwa Vonza
- Mombasa Campus - Mombasa
- City Centre Campus - Nairobi Central Business District
- Nyeri Campus - Nyeri
- Nakuru Campus - Nakuru
- Kericho Campus - Kericho - closed
- Dadaab Campus -Dadaab
- Embu Campus - Embu

Ruiru Campus was renamed as Kenyatta Model School for play groups, pre-primary and primary learners in 2024. The Arusha and Kigali campuses in Tanzania and Rwanda respectively were closed in 2018.

== History ==
In 1965, the British government handed over the Templar Barracks in Kahawa, to the newly formed government of Kenya. The southern part of the facility remains in military use, as the Kahawa Barracks. The other part of the barracks were converted into a college called Kenyatta College, which offered Advanced Level (A-Level) secondary education at Form 5 and 6 level, as well as some undergraduate diploma courses. In 1978 the entire Faculty of Education of the University of Nairobi was transferred to Kenyatta College, and its name was changed to Kenyatta University College, following an Act of Parliament. The school became the only institution in Kenya training teachers at the degree level, and discontinued all other courses. Degrees offered at Kenyatta were in the name of the University of Nairobi.

In 1985, it was granted full university status and was renamed Kenyatta University.

U.S. President Barack Obama, whose late father, Barack Obama, Sr. (an economist) and paternal relatives are from Kenya, visited Kenya in 2015. While there, he visited the university's main campus.

== Academics ==
As of March 2016, the university had 12 campuses offering bachelor's degrees, master's degrees, and doctoral degrees. The degrees awarded include those in medicine and law. The university has open-learning, e-learning which is known as the digital school, school-based, part-time and full-time teaching. Kenyatta University is accredited by the Kenya Commission of University Education, the Inter-University Council for East Africa, the Africa Association of Universities, the International Association of Universities and the Commonwealth Universities.

=== Library ===
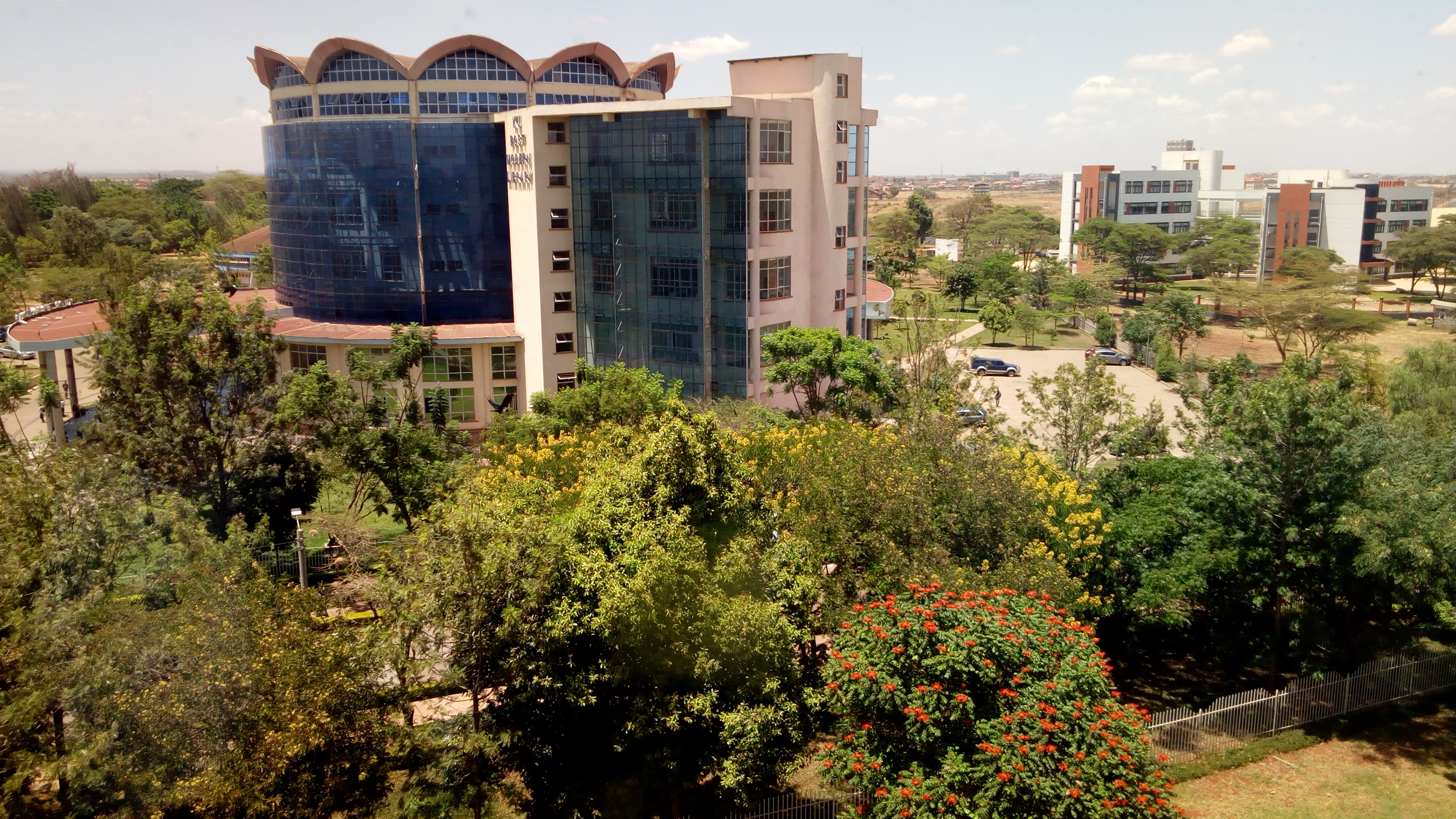
A view of Kenyatta University Library from the Central Administration Complex

Kenyatta University's library is one of the largest in Africa and offers scholarly information resources and services to its students and researchers. In addition to lending services, the library offers E-services and has branches in the respective satellite campuses.

=== Schools and institutes ===
As of April 2024, the university maintains the following schools:

School of Agriculture and Environmental Sciences
School of Business, Economics and Tourism
School of Education
School of Pure And Applied Sciences
School of Law, Arts and Social Sciences
School of Health Sciences
Digital School of Virtual & Open Learning
School of Engineering and Architecture
Graduate School

=== Institutes and centers ===
The university hosts institutes and centers including:

- Confucius Institute at Kenyatta University
- Africa Centre for Transformative and Inclusive Leadership (ACTIL)
- Chandaria Business Innovations and Incubation Centre (CBIIC)
- Center for Refugee Studies and Empowerment
- Cisco Networking Academy
- Centre for Entrepreneurship and Enterprise Development
- Center for International Programmes and Collaboration (CIPC)
- Centre for Gender Equity & Empowerment
- National Phytotherapeutics Research Centre

=== Degrees and courses ===
The university offers 14 doctorate and PhD courses, 94 master's degree courses, 117 bachelor's degree courses and 12 postgraduate diploma courses as accredited by the Commission for University Education in Kenya (CUE).

== Student life ==
=== International students ===
The Centre for International Programmes and Collaboration is a unit under the office of the vice chancellor, responsible for coordinating international activities, collaborations and linkages.

=== Athletics ===
Kenyatta University partnered with IAAF as an athletics-village in the 2017 world under 18 championship Nairobi. The athletes were hosted in the Nyayo hostels and used the campus facilities for training.

==== Men's sports ====
Men's sports include football, rugby, hockey, volleyball, netball, handball, basketball, tennis, table tennis, squash, badminton, chess, scrabble, darts, boxing, bodybuilding, taekwondo, swimming, athletics (track and field), scrabble, karate, roll ball, woodball, judo, wrestling, goalball, baseball, and softball.

==== Women's sports ====
fWomen's sports include football, rugby, hockey, volleyball, netball, handball, basketball, tennis, table tennis, squash, badminton, chess, scrabble, darts, boxing, fitness modelling, Taekwondo, swimming, athletics (track and field), Karate, roll ball, woodball, Judo, goalball, baseball, and softball.

Seminars and courses in coaching, sports management, training and sports leadership are offered.

==== Sports facilities ====
- Two swimming pools
- One gymnasium
- Five soccer fields
- Eight tennis courts
- Four volleyball courts
- One rugby field
- Two badminton courts
- One squash court
- Three netball fields
- Two athletics and track fields (IAAF track)
- Three handball courts
- Two hockey fields
- Four basketball courts
- Two common rooms for indoor sports and board games
- One rollball court

==== Sports achievements ====
- 2012 - National Champions, Kenya University Women's Games
- 2011 - National Champions, Kenya University Games
- 2009 - National Champions, Kenya University Games

== Management ==
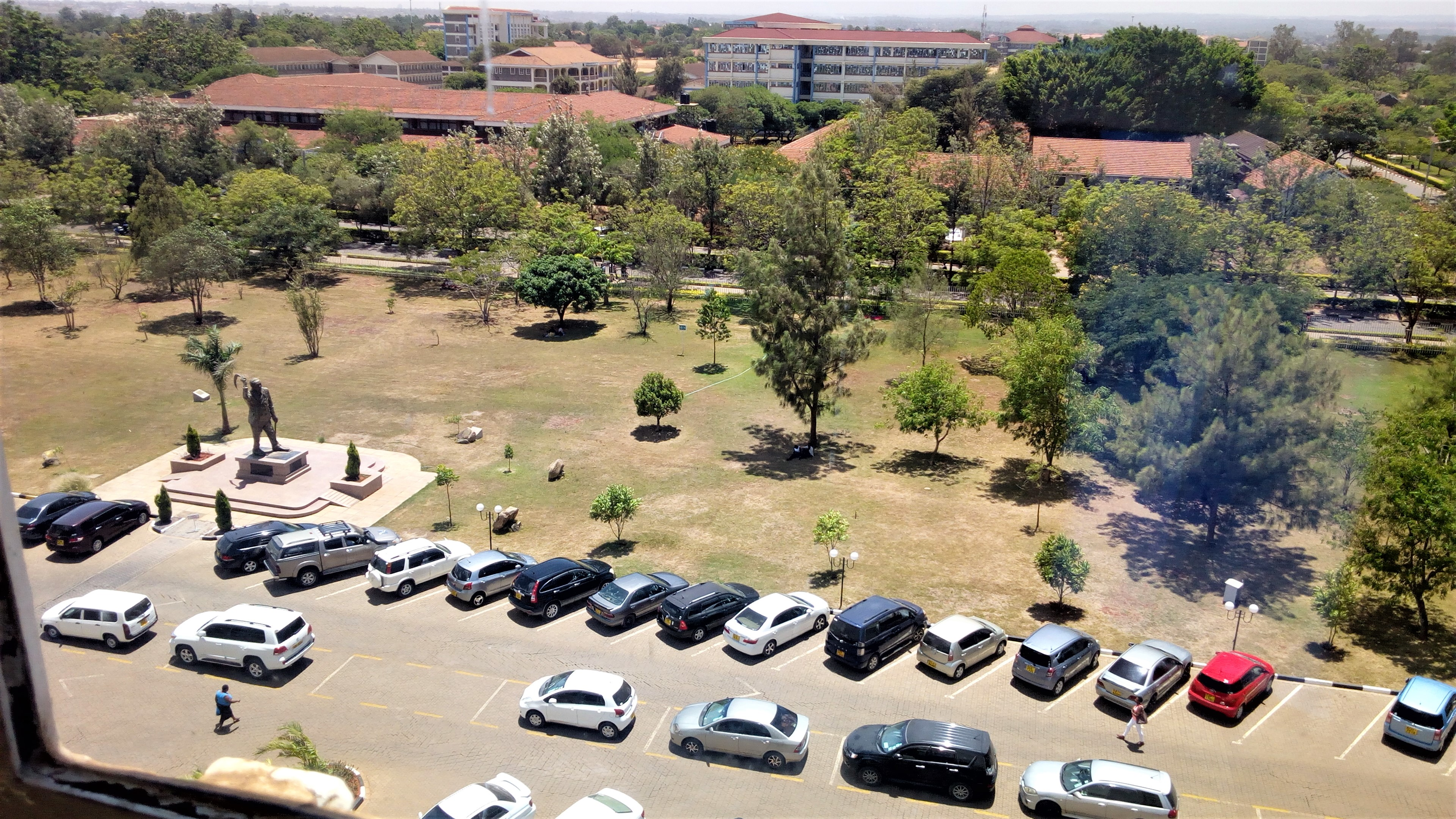
Kenyatta University Central Administration parking lot. The Junior Library and Education building can be seen in the background.

The chancellor is Benson Wairegi. The vice chancellor is Professor Paul Wainaina, who was reinstated on November 3, 2022, after being suspended on July 12, 2022, due to a dispute with the government over the university's land. During his suspension, Professor Waceke Wanjohi was appointed to act as the vice chancellor. Wainaina had succeeded Professor Olive Mugenda, the first female vice chancellor of a public university in Kenya, who retired after the end of her tenure in January 2016. There are four deputy vice chancellors and four registrars, to assist the vice chancellor in carrying out his mandate.

The deputy vice chancellors are:

- DVC Academic Affairs: Professor John Okumu
- DVC Administration: Professor Fatuma Chege
- DVC Finance and Development: Professor Godfrey Mse
- DVC Research, Innovation & Outreach: Professor F.Q Gravenir

== Businesses and investments ==
The university owns and operates the following income-generating businesses and investments:

- Kenyatta University Funeral Home
- North Coast Beach Hotel - Mombasa
- Uni-City Shopping Mall & Office Complex - Nairobi
- Kenyatta University Conference Center - Nairobi (100 rooms)
- Kenyatta University Bookstore - Nairobi
- Television station KUTV
- Kenyatta University Children's Hospital - Nairobi (under construction)
- Kenyatta University Dairy Farm (in development)
- Kenyatta University Hospital (KUH)

== Alumni ==
The following individuals are some of the prominent alumni of the Kenyatta University website:

- Dr. Eddah Gachukia - academic director, Riara Group of Schools
- Dr. Geoffrey William Griffin - founder director of Starehe Boys' Centre and School
- Daudi Kabaka - musician and band leader of Kenyatta University Band
- Mwai Kibaki - former president of Kenya, 2002 to 2013
- Jakaya Kikwete - president of the United Republic of Tanzania, 2005 to 2015
- Fredrick Muyia Nafukho - professor, Foster School of Business
- Benjamin Mkapa - former president of Tanzania, 1995 to 2005
- Daniel arap Moi - former president of Kenya, 1978 to 2002
- Professor Joseph Maina Mungai - former vice-chancellor, University of Nairobi
- Kalonzo Musyoka - former vice president of Kenya
- Dr. James Mwangi - managing director and chief executive officer, Equity Bank Group
- Esther Ngumbi - entomologist and winner of the 2018 Society for Experimental Biology Presidential Award
- Dr. Mostafa Tolba - former executive director of the United Nations Environment Programme

== Notable staff and professors ==
- Prof. Mike Boit - sports science, former athlete; received an honorary Doctorate of Science (DSc) from the University of Glasgow in recognition of his contributions to the academic research of sports and its development in Kenya 2014
- Ambassador Joseph Magutt - Kenya's ambassador to the Republic of Germany
- Prof. Olive Mugenda - former vice-chancellor (2009-2016), board chair of KU Kospital

== Gallery ==
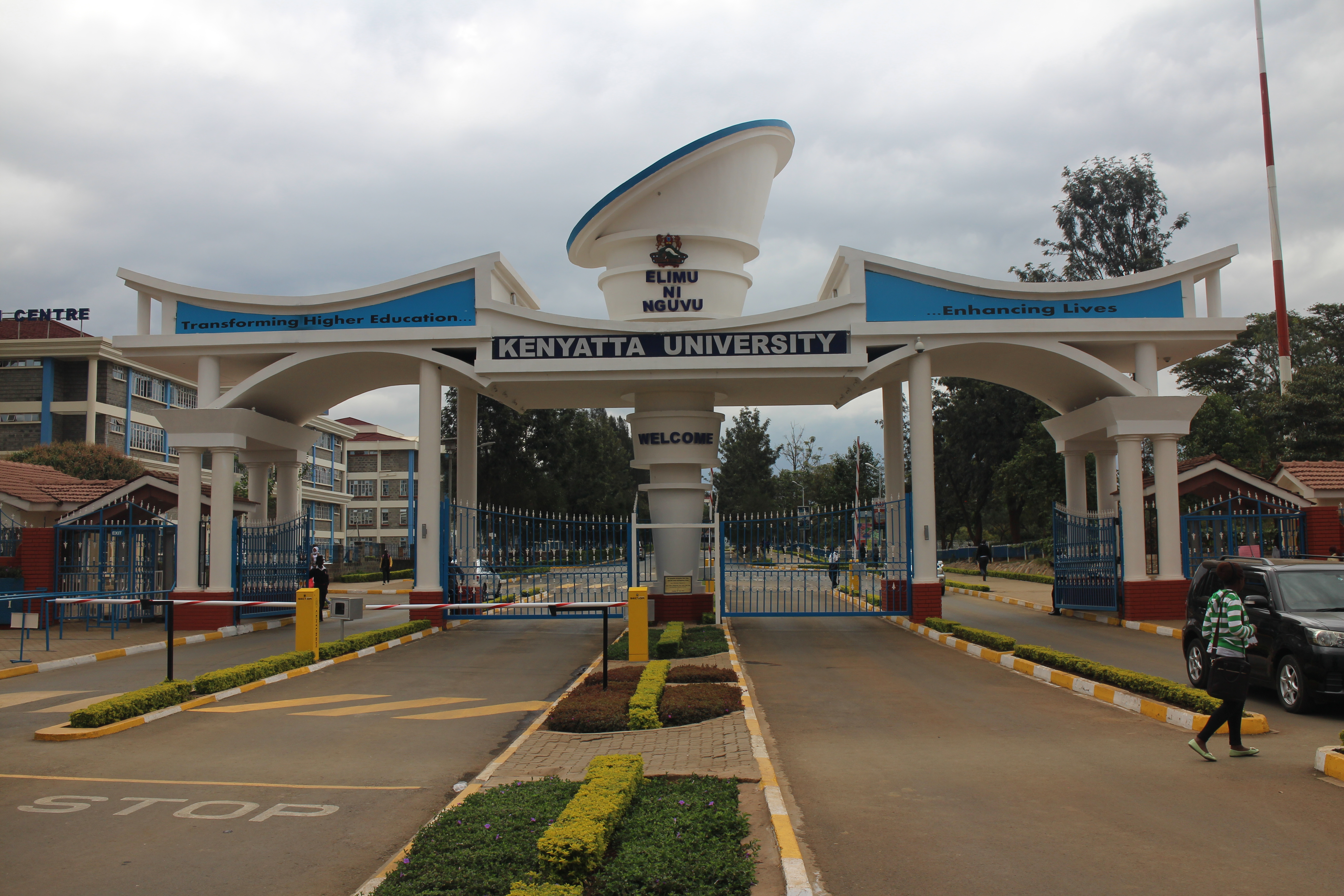
Main entrance

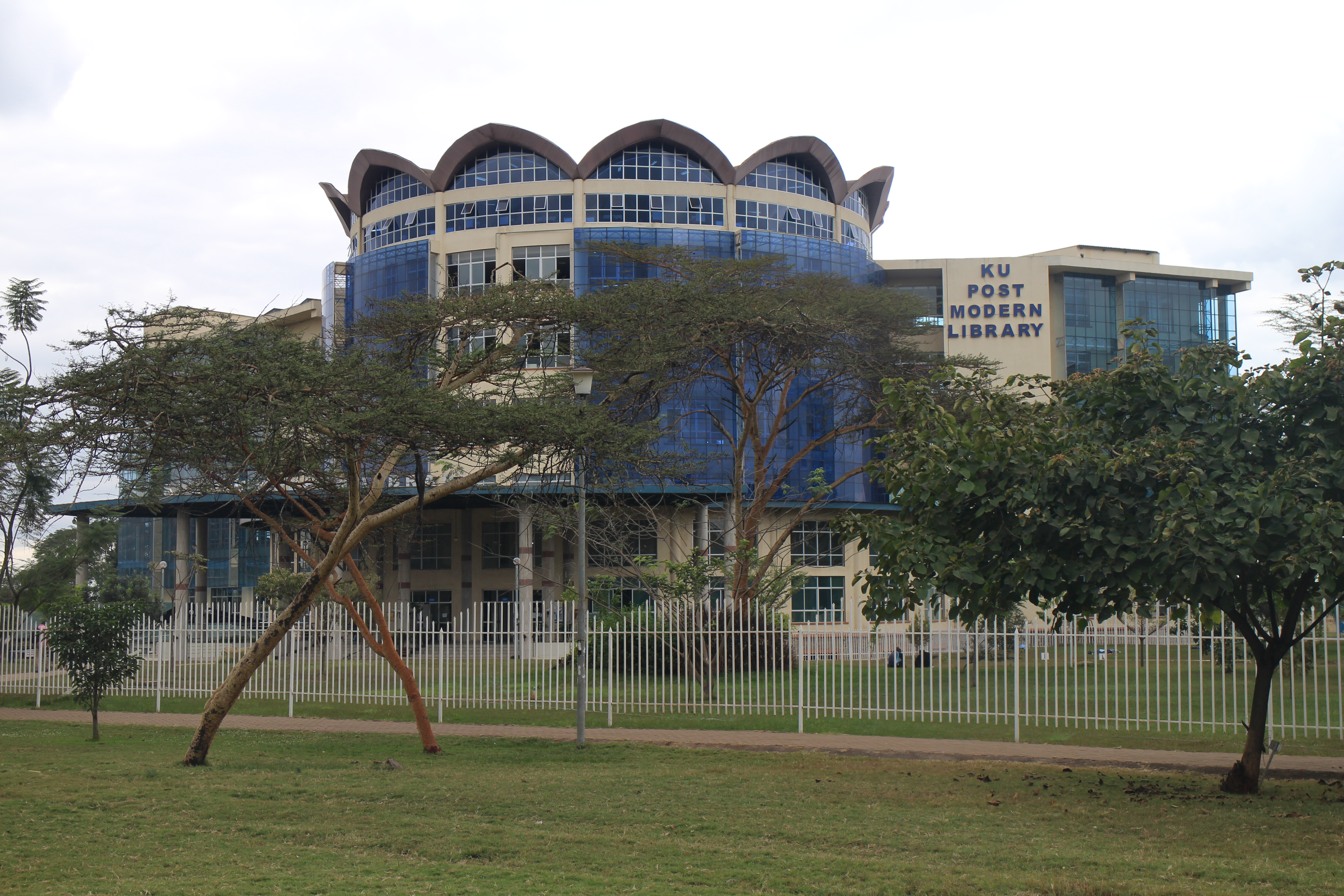
Main library

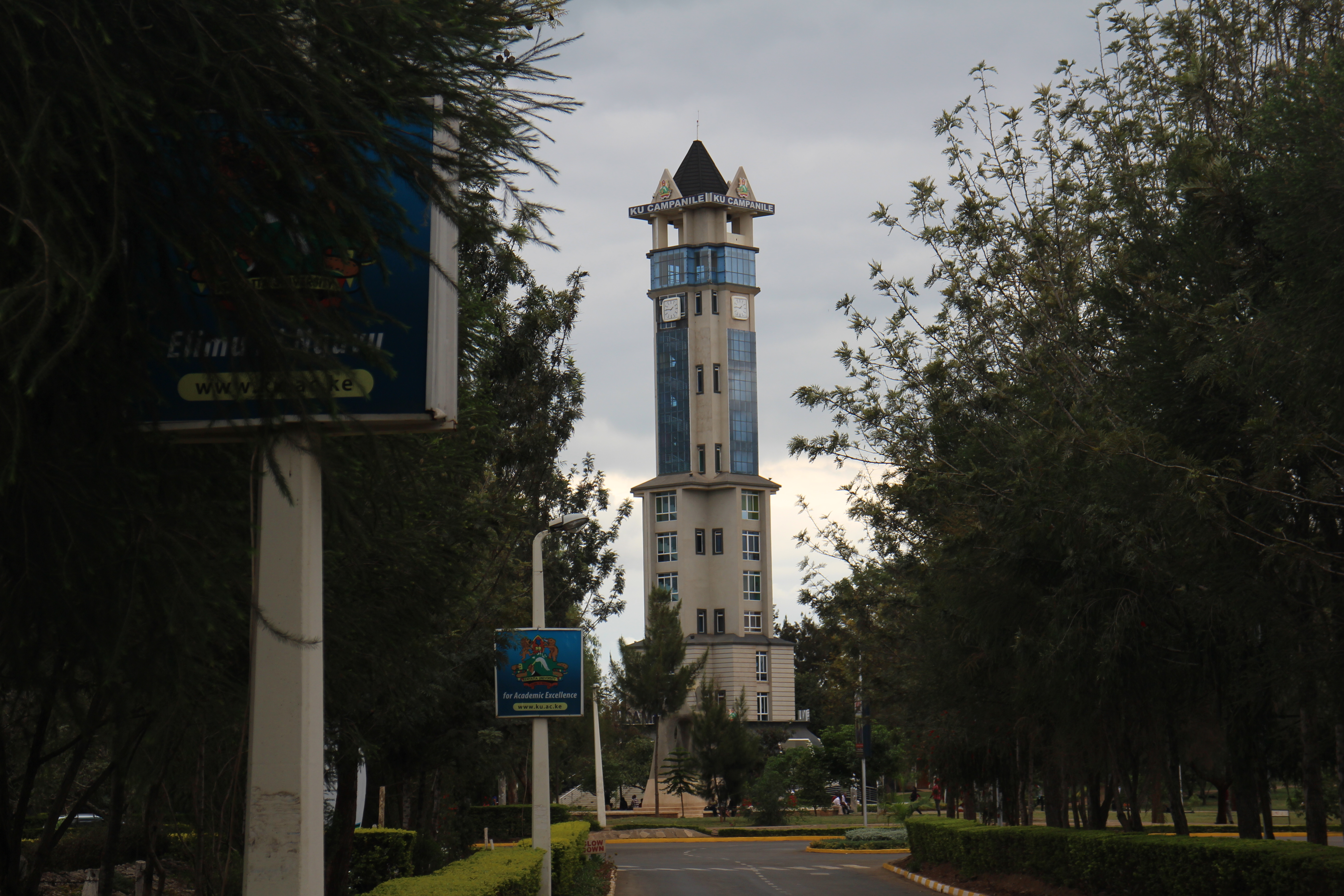
The Campanile

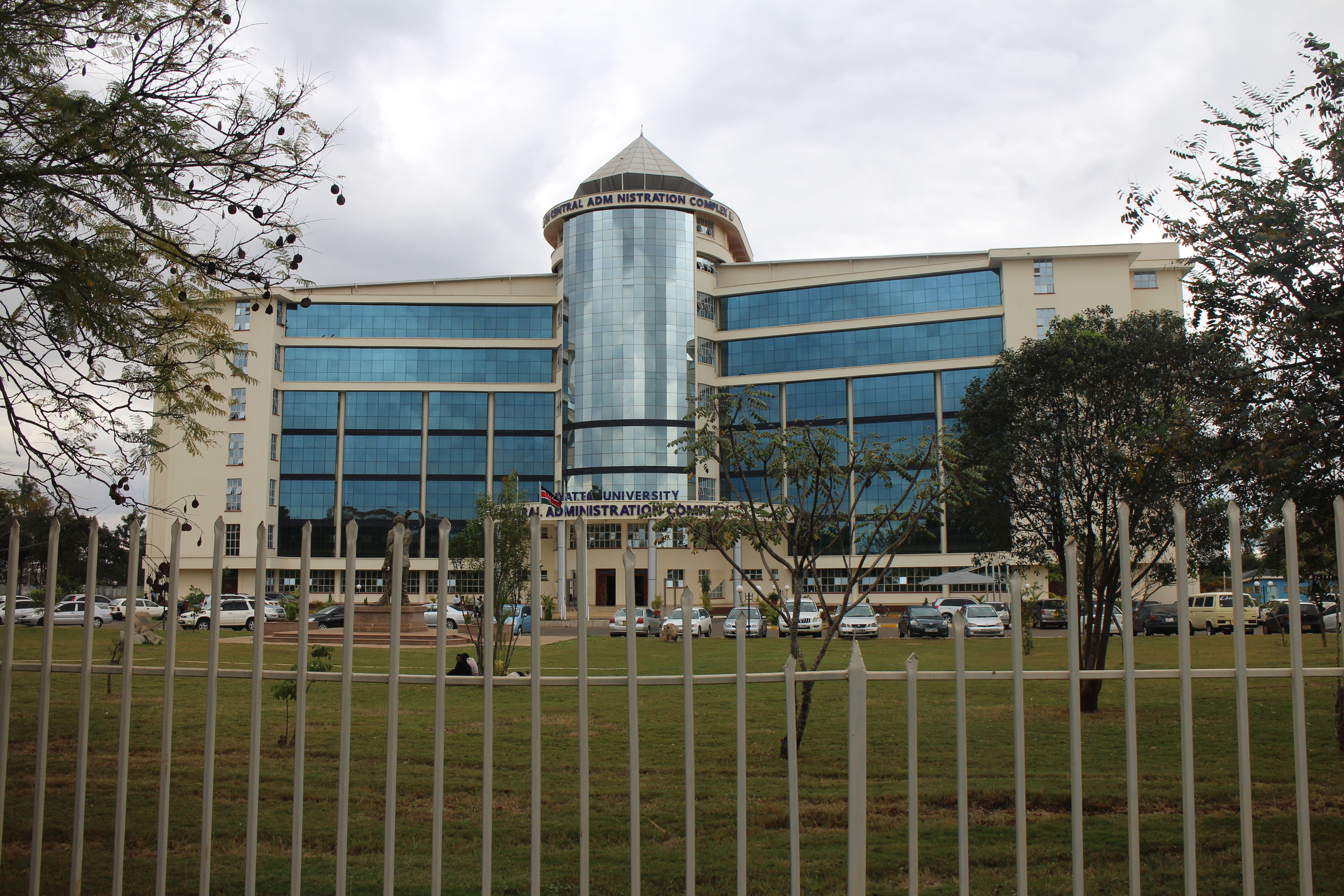
Central Administration Complex

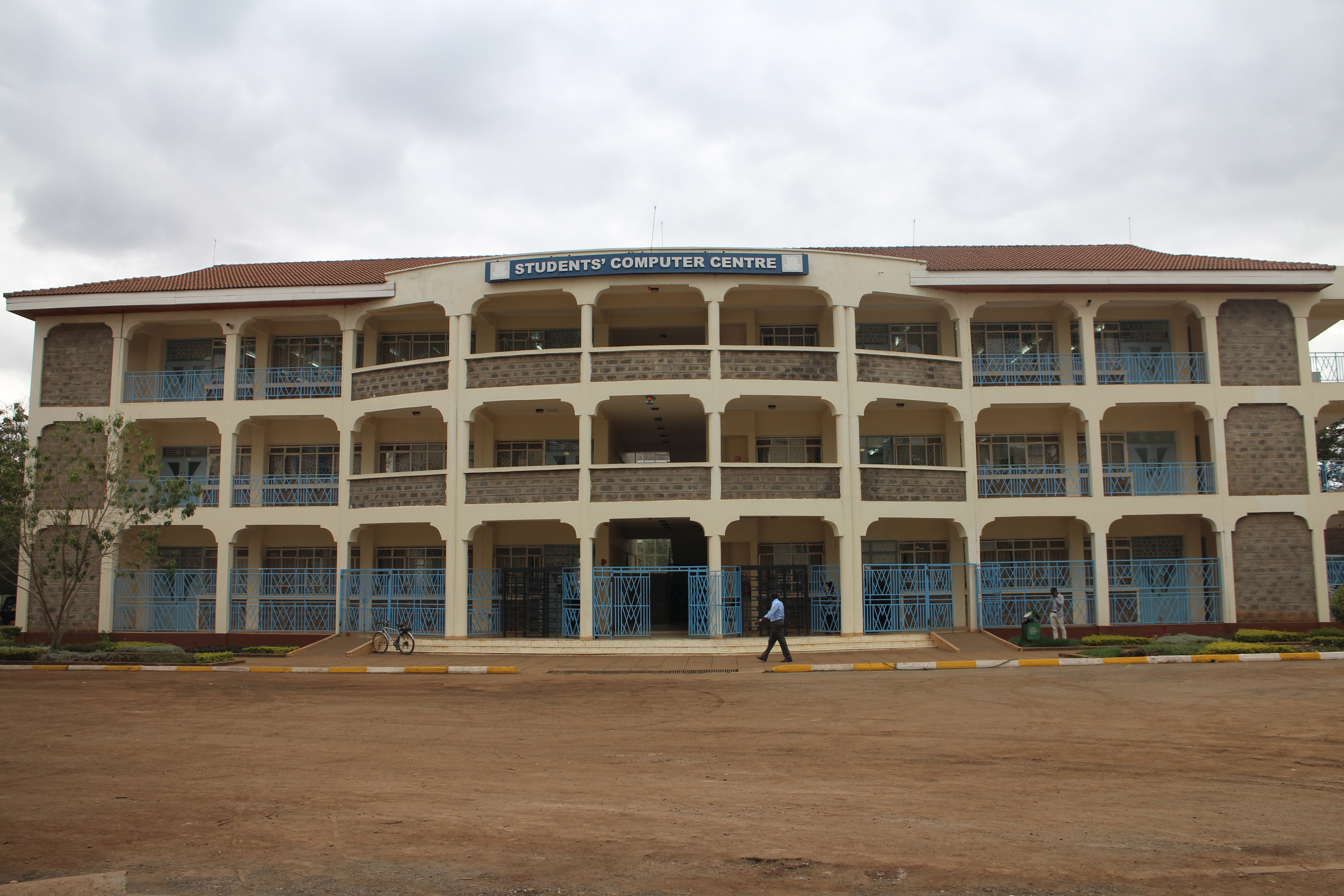
Students' Computer Centre

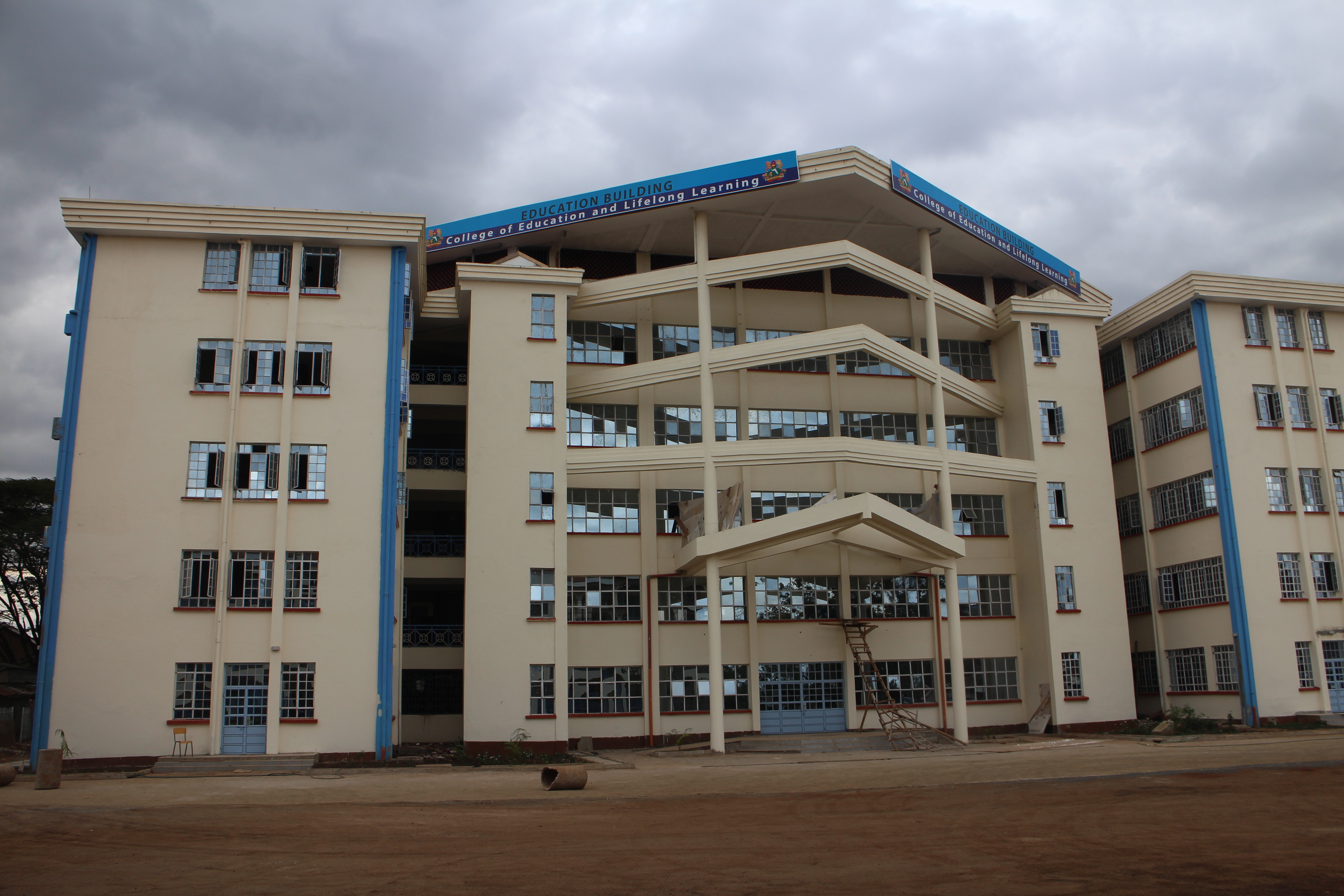
Education Building

== See also ==
- List of universities in Kenya
- Education in Kenya
