= Esther Ngumbi =

Kenyan-American entomologist

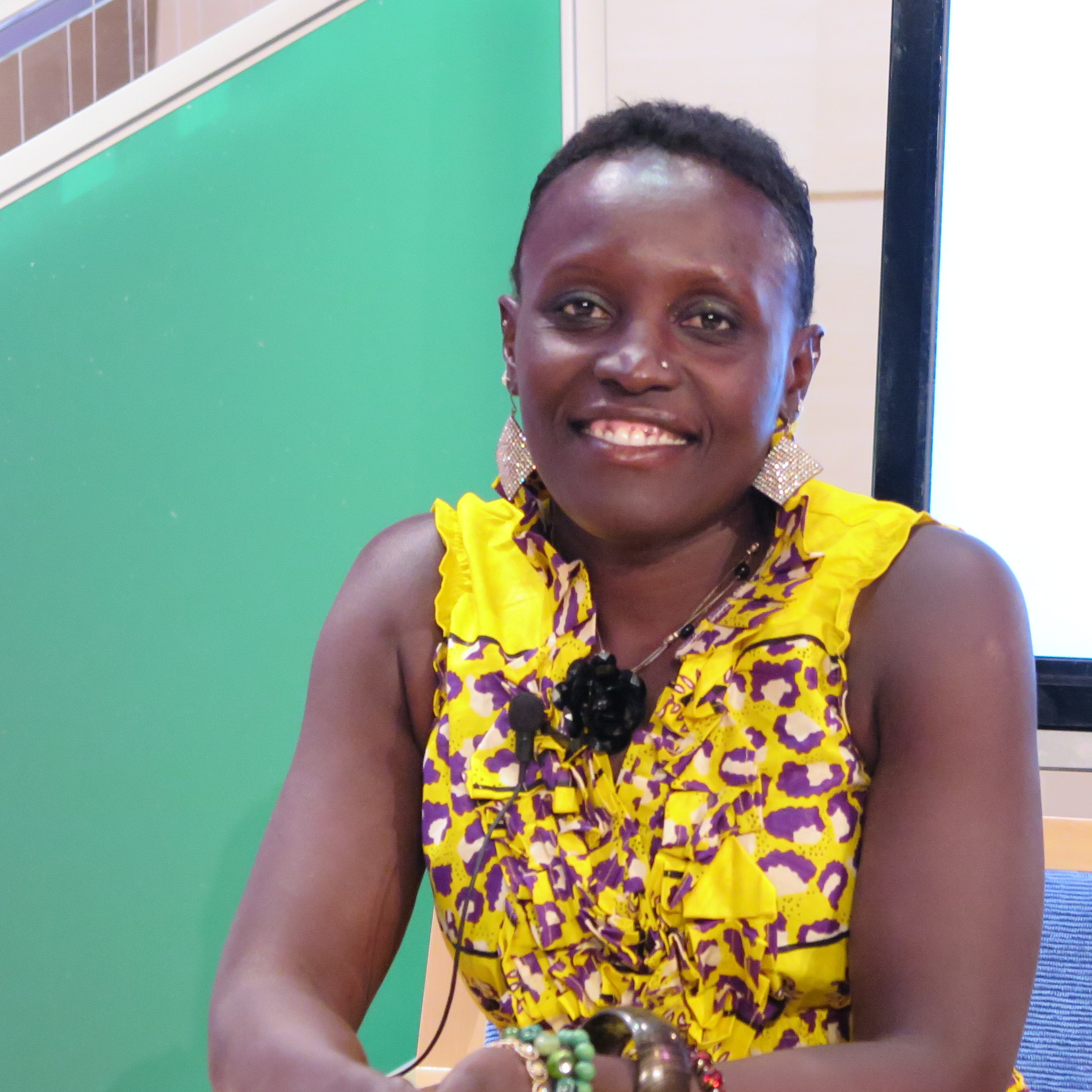
- Ngumbi in 2015
- Born: Kenya
- Education: Kenyatta University; Auburn University
- Scientific career
- Workplaces: University of Illinois at Urbana–Champaign; Auburn University

Esther Ndumi Ngumbi is a Kenyan-American entomologist and academic who is currently an Assistant Professor of Entomology and African-American Studies at the University of Illinois at Urbana–Champaign. She was awarded the 2018 Society for Experimental Biology Presidential Award.

== Early life and education ==
Esther Ngumbi grew up in Kwale County, a rural farming community in Kenya. She was introduced to farming at the age of seven, when her parents gave her a strip of land to cultivate cabbages. As a child she became aware of the challenges that farmers faced, including drought and bad soils. The first time she left her village was to attend Kenyatta University, where she earned her Bachelor's and Master's degrees. In 2007 she was awarded an American Association of University Women (AAUW) International Fellowship that allowed her to complete a doctoral degree in entomology at Auburn University. In 2011 she became one of the first people from her community to achieve a doctorate. After earning her PhD she remained at Auburn University as a postdoctoral scholar.

== Research and career ==
Ngumbi began serving as an Assistant Professor of Entomology and African-American studies and the University of Illinois at Urbana–Champaign in 2018. She also teaches science communication. She studies the way that herbivores, plants, micro-organisms and insects make use of volatile and non-volatile chemical signals. These include volatile organic compounds (VOCs) that mediate conversations between plants, herbivores and microbes. Ngumbi believes that better urban agriculture can help to combat unhealthy eating. In 2019 Ngumbi delivered the plenary lecture at the British Ecological Society annual meeting.

=== Academic service and recognition ===
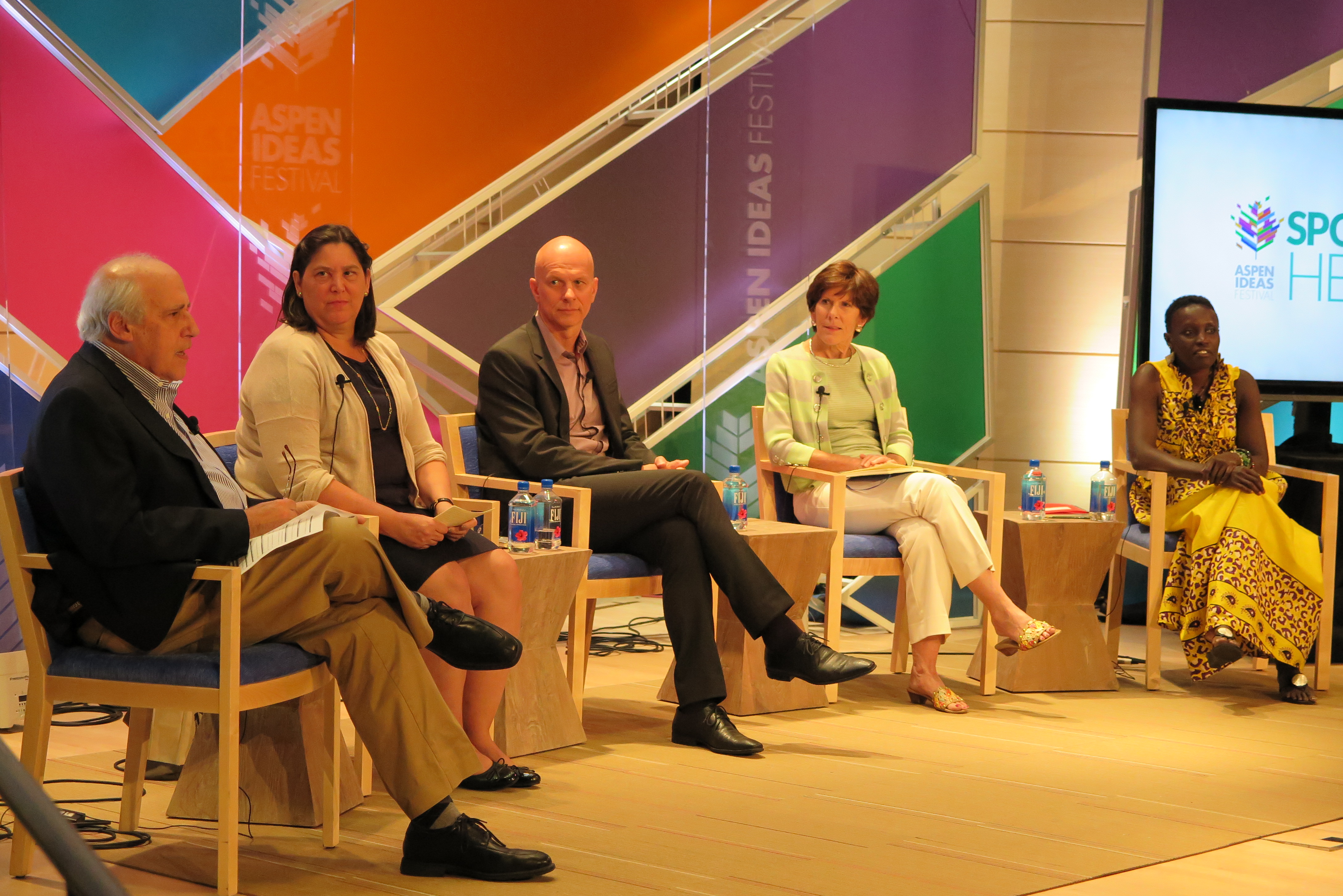
Ngumbi at right discussing food security at Spotlight Health Aspen Ideas Festival in 2015

She was awarded the 2017 Emerging Sustainability Leader Award and Women of Colour Award. In 2018 Ngumbi was awarded the Society for Experimental Biology's President's Medal.

Ngumbi is an active science communicator and has contributed to Mail & Guardian, The Moth, Scientific American and the World Economic Forum. She has appeared on Wisconsin Public Radio. Ngumbi was selected by Barack Obama to be part of the Young African Leadership Initiative. She mentors young researchers through the Clinton Foundation. She has campaigned for girls from rural communities to have better access to education, particularly in science and technology. Working with her family, Ngumbi helped to establish Dr Ndumi Faulu Academy, a school in her hometown that serves over 100 middle school students. In 2021 Ngumbi was awarded the Mani L. Bhaumik Award for Public Engagement with Science by the American Association for the Advancement of Science.

=== Selected publications ===
Her publications include:

- Ngumbi, Esther (2016). "Bacterial-mediated drought tolerance: current and future prospects". Applied Soil Ecology. 105: 109–125. Bibcode:2016AppSE.105..109N. doi:10.1016/j.apsoil.2016.04.009.
- Ngumbi, Esther (2009). "Comparative GC-EAD Responses of A Specialist (Microplitis croceipes) and A Generalist (Cotesia marginiventris) Parasitoid to Cotton Volatiles Induced by Two Caterpillar Species". Journal of Chemical Ecology. 35 (9): 1009–1020. Bibcode:2009JCEco..35.1009N. doi:10.1007/s10886-009-9700-y. PMID 19802643. S2CID 5921837.
- Ngumbi, Esther (2012-12-01). "Comparison of associative learning of host-related plant volatiles in two parasitoids with different degrees of host specificity, Cotesia marginiventris and Microplitis croceipes". Chemoecology. 22 (4): 207–215. Bibcode:2012Chmec..22..207N. doi:10.1007/s00049-012-0106-x. S2CID 14865498.
