= Fredrick Muyia Nafukho =

Kenyan-American academic

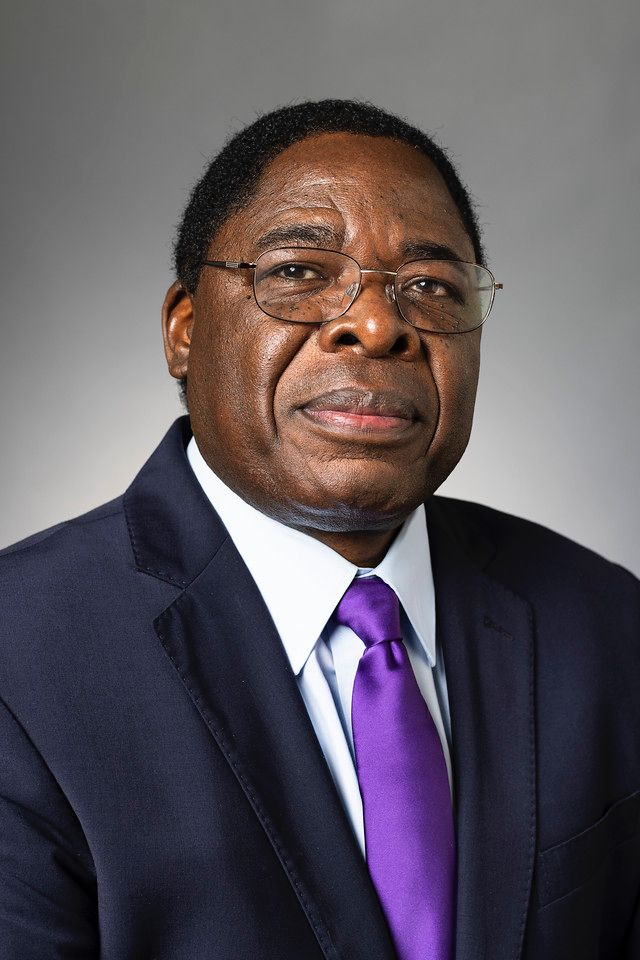
- Fredrick Muyia Nafukho in 2023
- Occupations: Vice provost for Academic Personnel, professor of Management and Organization, Foster School of Business, and Presidential Term Professor at the University of Washington

Academic background
- Education: Kenyatta University (Bachelor's); Kenyatta University (M.Ed); Louisiana State University (PhD); Harvard University (Certificate)

Fredrick Muyia Nafukho serves as vice provost for Academic Personnel, professor of Management and Organization, Foster School of Business, and Presidential Term Professor at the University of Washington, Seattle, Washington. He previously served as a professor of Educational Administration and Human Resource Development and associate dean for Faculty Affairs, College of Education and Human Development at Texas A&M University.

== Early life and education ==
Fredrick Muyia Nafukho earned a B.Ed. in Business Studies and Economics and an M.Ed. in Economics of Education from Kenyatta University, Kenya. He earned his Ph.D. in Leadership and Human Resource Development from Louisiana State University. He attended Harvard's Management Development Program (MDP) offered by Harvard Institutes for Higher Education and was certified in 2013.

== Career ==
Nafukho has served on the faculty of four institutions of higher education: University of Washington, Texas A&M University, University of Arkansas and Moi University. He has been an associate dean for faculty affairs, a department head, a program chair, and a professor (at Texas A&M); an associate professor, a graduate program director, and an assistant department head (at University of Arkansas); and a department head and senior lecturer (at Moi University).

== Research ==
Nafukho's research focuses on educational policy analysis within international and comparative education, investment in human capital development, emotional intelligence and leadership development, organisational development, human and organisational learning including the transfer of learning, e-learning and lifelong learning.

The African Ubuntu worldview of "I am because we are" is articulated in his two books published by Pearson Education and UNESCO, Foundations of Adult Education in Africa, and Management of Adult Education Organisations in Africa.

== Awards and honors ==
- Fulbright Fellowship, Fulbright Program, 1996
- Distinguished International Scholar Award, Louisiana State University, 1997
- Outstanding New Faculty Award, Dean's Development Council, College of Education and Human Development at Texas A&M University, 2008
- Carnegie African Diaspora Fellowship, 2016, International Institute of Education
- Outstanding HRD Scholar Award 2019, Academy of Human Resource Development (AHRD)

== Bibliography ==
=== Publications ===
- Nafukho, Fredrick (2005). Foundations of adult education in Africa. Pearson South Africa. ISBN 92-820-1121-6.
- Nafukho, Fredrick (2006). Road traffic injury prevention: Training manual.
- Nafukho, Fredrick (2011). "Management of adult education organizations in Africa". International Review of Education. 57 (5–6): 771. Bibcode:2011IREdu..57..771A. doi:10.1007/s11159-011-9243-7.
- Nafukho, Fredrick (2012). Learning entrepreneurship through Indigenous Knowledge.
- Nafukho, Fredrick (2014). Governance and transformation of universities in Africa.
- Nafukho, Fredrick (2015). Informal public transport in practice: Matatu entrepreneurship.
- Nafukho, Fredrick (2015). Handbook of research on innovative technology integration in higher education.
- Nafukho, Fredrick (2017). Talent development and the global economy: Perspectives from special interest groups.
- Nafukho, Fredrick (2019). Global issues and talent development: Perspectives from countries around the world.
- Nafukho, Fredrick (2021). Handbook of research on nurturing industrial economy for Africa's development. IGI Global. ISBN 978-1-7998-6472-1.
