= Stanley Munga Githunguri =

Kenyan politician

Stanley Mūnga Gìthūngūri
- Born: February 17, 1945; Gachie, Kiambu District, Kenya
- Died: November 30, 2022 (aged 77); Kenya
- Education: Alaska Methodist University (Political Science & Economics)
- Occupations: Politician, Businessman
- Known for: Owning Lilian Towers & Nakumatt Ridgeways
- Office: Member of Parliament for Kiambaa Constituency
- Predecessor: Njenga Karume
- Successor: Paul Koinange
- Political party: Kenya African National Union (KANU)

Stanley Munga Gìthūngūri (1945-2022) was a Kenyan politician, banker, and businessman.

== Early life ==
He was born on 17 February 1945 in Gachie, Kiambu District.

He attended Gacharage Primary School from 1954 to 1957 before going to Karura Intermediate School (1958-1961). He then attended St. Mary's School, Nairobi, between 1962 and 1964.

== Education and career ==
He had a degree in political science and economics from Alaska Methodist University in the USA.

Gìthūngūri worked as a bank manager at the National Bank of Kenya between 1969 and 1971. He later served as Executive Chair of the bank, serving between 1976 and 1971.

He belonged to the Kenya African National Union and was elected to represent the Kiambaa Constituency in the National Assembly of Kenya after the 2007 Kenyan parliamentary election. In the 2013 elections, he lost the senatorial race for Kiambu County.

Stanley Gìthūngūri was a successful businessman within the city, owning several assets, including the Lilian Towers building, which consists of a five-star hotel in Nairobi, and Ridgeways Mall, which is located at the border of Kiambu County with Nairobi County.

Upon his death, his estate was estimated at KSh. 1.8bn.

Gìthūngūri died on November 30, 2022, at Nairobi Hospital after a long struggle with dementia and diabetes.
