= Olive Mugenda =

Kenyan academic

Olive Mwìhaki Mūgenda
- Born: 1956 (age 69–70); Kenya
- Citizenship: Kenya
- Education: University of Nairobi (Bachelor of Education); Iowa State University (Master of Science) (Doctor of Philosophy); Eastern and Southern African Management Institute (Master of Business Administration)
- Occupations: Academic & academic administrator
- Years active: 1988–present
- Title: Chancellor; KCA University

Olive Mwìhaki Mūgenda is a Kenyan academic, researcher and academic administrator. She is the former chairperson of the board of directors at the Kenyatta University Teaching, Referral and Research Hospital, a leading national referral hospital. She was appointed vice chancellor of Kenyatta University, one of the 31 public universities in Kenya, in 2006. She was the first woman to lead a public university in the African Great Lakes area, and served in that position until 20 March 2016.

Mūgenda was cited as one of the top 100 most influential Africans by New African magazine in 2016.

== Background and education ==
Mūgenda was born and raised in Kenya. She attended the University of Nairobi, graduating with a Bachelor of Education degree. She studied at Iowa State University, obtaining the degree of Master of Science in family studies in 1983. Her degree of Doctor of Philosophy, in the same field, was obtained in 1988, also from Iowa State University. She also holds a Master of Business Administration from the Eastern and Southern African Management Institute.

== Career ==
When Mūgenda graduated with her first degree, she joined the staff at Kenyatta University, in 1981, as a tutorial fellow. Because she had done very well during her Bachelor of Education studies, obtaining a first class honors degree, she was given a scholarship to study at Iowa State University for her master's degree and doctorate.

After her graduate studies in the United States, she returned to lecture at Kenyatta University. She specialized in "women's education, home economics, statistics and research methodology". She was promoted from lecturer, to head of department, to dean of faculty. Then she was appointed deputy vice chancellor for Finance and Planning. In 2006, when the position of vice chancellor at the university was advertised, she applied and beat three other applicants, all male, for the job. As vice chancellor, one of her major accomplishments was the establishment of Kenyatta University Referral Hospital, a 500-bed referral hospital, wholly owned by the university, which cost US$95 million to construct. In October 2013, Mūgenda was appointed chairperson of the Council of the Association of Commonwealth Universities. The association is the oldest international universities network, with over 500 universities in 37 countries as members. The secretariat is based in London, United Kingdom.

After her retirement from Kenyatta University, President Uhuru Kenyatta nominated Mūgenda to serve in the Judicial Service Commission, where she is to represent members of the public. She was also appointed in April 2019 as the chairperson of the board of the Kenyatta University Teaching & Referral Hospital in 2019. The board was tasked to kickstart operations in the hospital that had been lying idle years after completion due to uncertainties over its management and ownership structure. However, in December 2024, she officially resigned as the board chair.

== Family ==
Mūgenda and her late husband, Abel Mūgenda, an academic at the University of Nairobi, are the parents of four children.
