= National Youth Service (Kenya) =

Organisation under the Government of Kenya

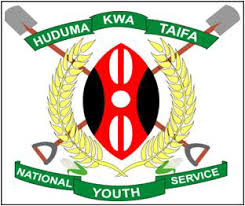
- Abbreviation: NYS
- Formation: 1964; 62 years ago
- Founder: Geoffrey Griffin
- Type: Non-combatant Paramilitary and Civilian volunteer organisation
- Purpose: Youth mentorship
- Headquarters: Nairobi
- Fields: TVET, Engineering, Agriculture, Textiles, Security
- Members: Voluntary
- Commandant General: James K. Tembur, MBS
- Key people: Lt. Gen. (Rtd) Adan K. Mulata MGH, CBS, OGW, NDC (K), PSC(UK) (chairman)
- Main organ: Governing Council
- Parent organization: Ministry of Public Service, Youth and Gender Affairs
- Budget: Ksh 13.2 B (USD 120.39 M) (2019/2020)
- Staff: 2,000 (2019)
- Volunteers: 30,000 (2019)
- Website: nys.go.ke

The National Youth Service (NYS) is an organisation under the Government of Kenya. It was established in 1964 to train young people in important national matters. In 2019, the organization was transformed from a state department to a fully fledged semi-autonomous state corporation after enactment of the National Youth Service Act, 2018 by the Kenyan parliament.

== Purpose ==
The main purpose of NYS is to train and mentor Kenya's youth through:

1. Paramilitary and regimentation
2. National building programs
3. Technical and vocational training in various skills and trades

== Enrollment ==
Enrollment to the service is voluntary for Kenyan youth aged between 18–24 years old. Upon enlistment, the recruits are subjected to rigorous non-combat paramilitary training for 6 months.

The recruits are required to offer at least 6 months of national service, which may include:

- Construction
- Vector control
- Slums upgrade program
- Traffic Control
- Public security
- Agriculture

Before the late 1980s, students had to participate in the organisation before admission into universities. Today, recruitment is done on a volunteer basis.

After successfully completing the compulsory national service, the recruits are sent to technical and vocational schools within NYS to train in various fields such as agriculture, engineering and hospitality. The training is free of charge to all recruits.

== List of NYS TVET Colleges ==
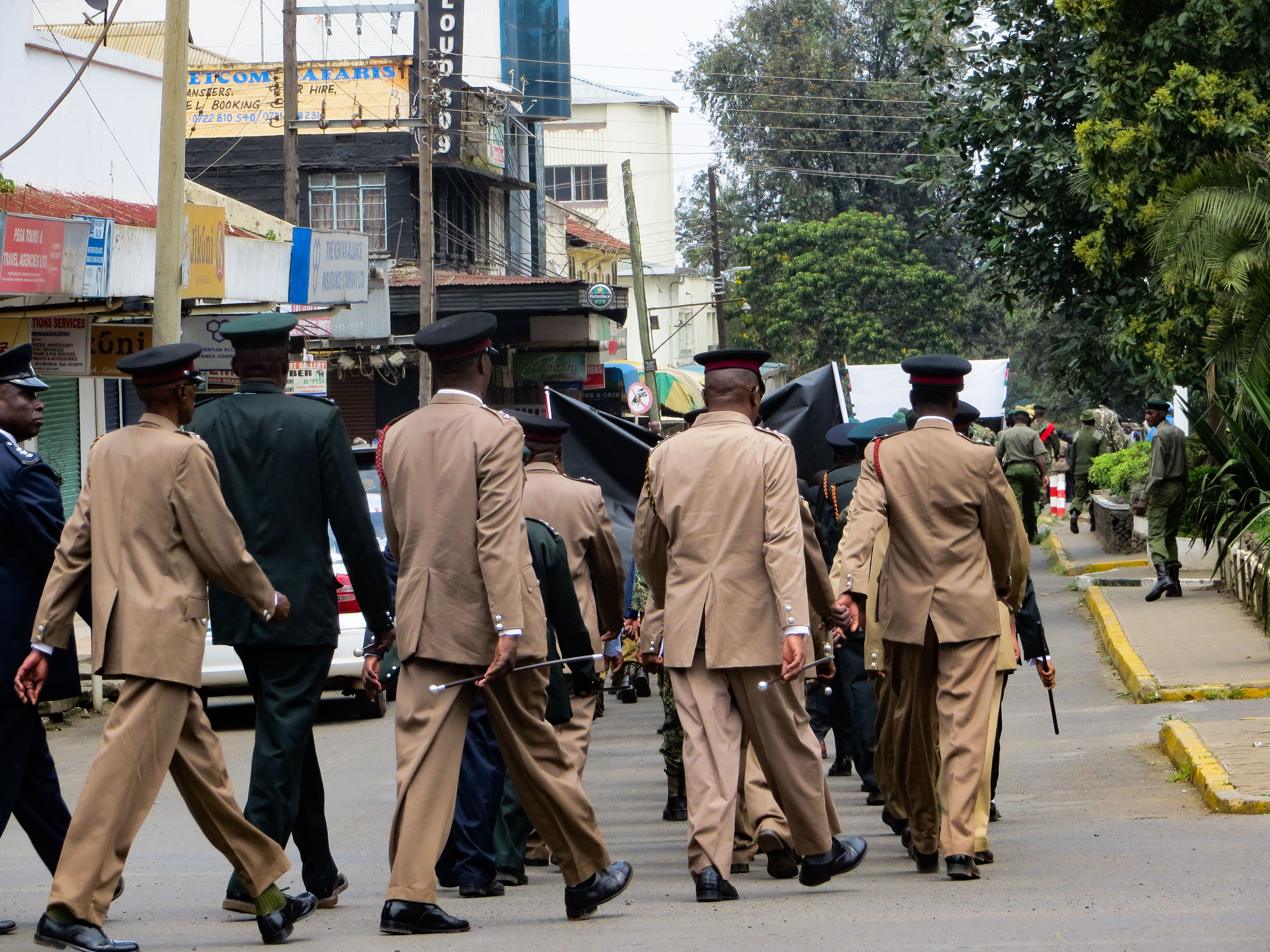
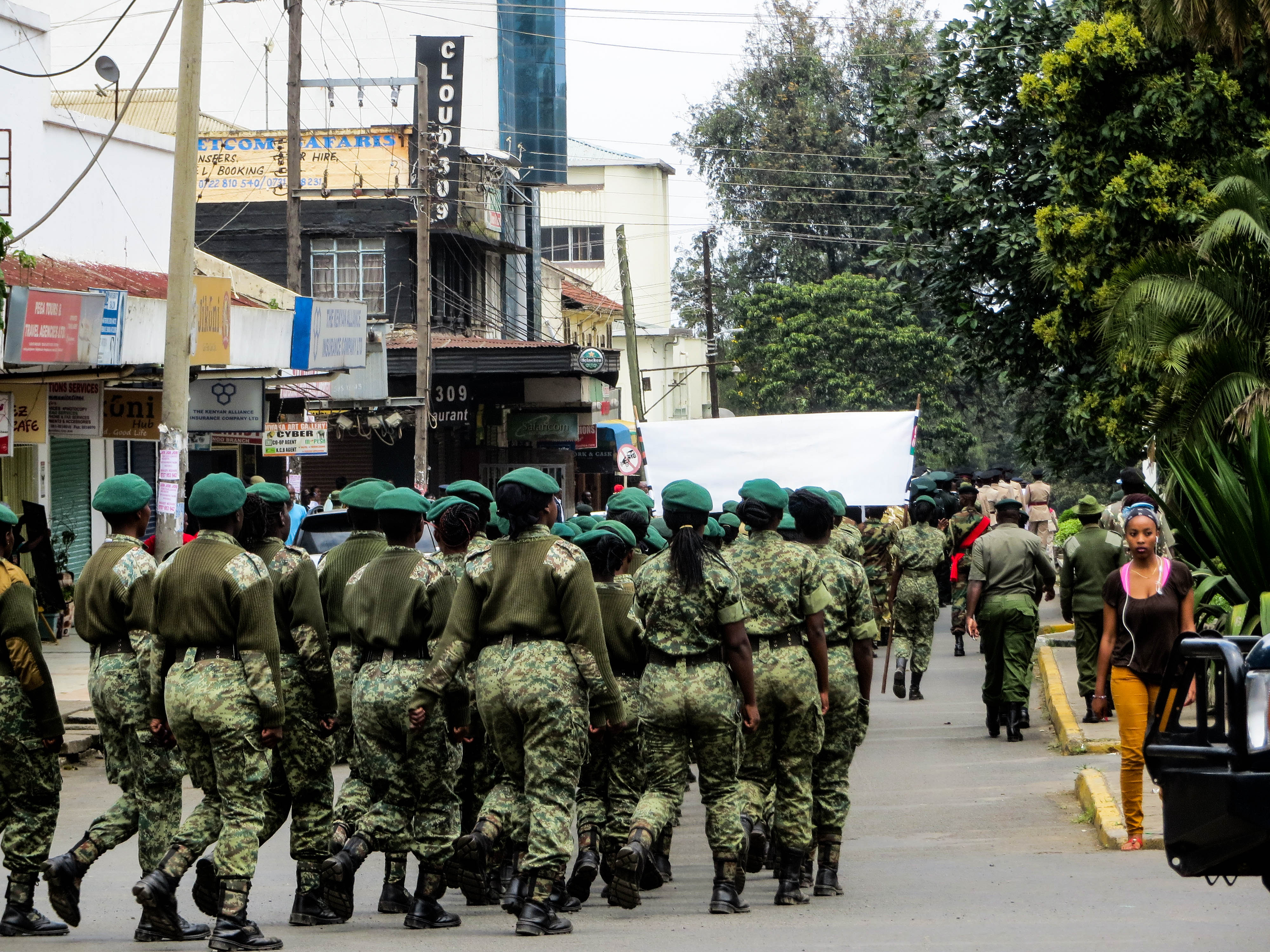
National Youth Service officials (top) and other members (bottom) in Nakuru

The following is a list of TVET institutions run by the NYS:

- NYS Institute of Business Studies – Nairobi
- NYS Engineering Institute – Nairobi
- Nairobi Engineering Craft School – Nairobi
- NYS Yatta College
- Textile & Garment Training Institute – Nairobi
- Advanced Building School – Gilgil
- NYS Technical College – Mombasa
- Rural Craft Training Center – Turbo
- NYS Driving School
- Plant Operator School – Kerio Valley
- Early Childhood College – Naivasha
- Vocational Training Institute – Nairobi
- Catering and Hospitality School – Gilgil
- On Job Training – Motor Transport Branch, Nairobi

== History ==
National Youth Service was established with the assistance of Israeli government, it was inspired by Nahal (fighting pioneer youth) and GADNA (Youth battalion) models which combined military service and the establishment of agricultural settlements. In Kenya, this model was attractive to the government to instil national values to the young people and to rehabilitate the freedom fighters (Mau Mau). The Israeli had hoped to use the youth training as their entry point to Africa.

In mid-1959, Kenyan statesman Tom Mboya had led a delegation to Israel where he and other African leaders had been introduced to the Gadna-Nahal movement, during a six-week seminar. After the conference, Mboya would later work with the Israelis to set up the National Youth Service all as part of Israel's efforts to build close ties with the administration of then-president Jomo Kenyatta.

In February 1966, after threats of disbandment, the service was included as part of disciplined forces in the April 1966 amendment of the Kenya Constitution.

Overall, the Nahal movement as crafted by the Israelis in East Africa failed. Steven Carol, a foreign policy scholar on the Nahal, speculated that the fate of the program was because most of the youth were illiterate and unlike the Israelis "they had no avowed enemy, or marauding terrorists across the border".

In 2013, the then-president Uhuru Kenyatta's government undertook efforts to make the NYS a major institution for youth empowerment. The organization's budget was increased by 1000% in 2014, but the organization struggled with managing this budget. To address these challenges, in 2008 the government carried out reforms of NYS that was aimed at dealing with endemic integrity problems, building capacity and professionalizing the organization. NYS was made a parastatal with a council to run its affairs.
