= Waceke Wanjohi =

Professor at Kenyatta University

Prof. Waceke Wanjohi
- Citizenship: Kenyan
- Occupation: Professor
- Employer: Kenyatta University
- Known for: Plant pathology and nematology research; Acting Vice Chancellor of Kenyatta University (from July 2022)
- Title: Vice Chancellor (Academic), Kenyatta University

Prof. Waceke Wanjohi is a professor at Kenyatta University who works in plant pathology, research, teaching, networking, and graduate education. She is the l Vice Chancellor (Academic) at Kenyatta University. She was appointed to act as the Vice chancellor of the same university from July 2022. Dedicated to boosting Africa's competitiveness in the global arena by improving agricultural output in smallholder farming systems in Sub-Saharan Africa.

== Research interests ==
- Vegetable nematode infestations
- Plant nematology capacity building in the regions At all levels, both human and infrastructure

== Publications ==
Publications:

- Wanjiku, E.K., Waceke, J.W. and Mbaka, J.N., 2021. Suppression of Stem-End Rot on Avocado Fruit Using Trichoderma spp. in the Central Highlands of Kenya. Advances in Agriculture, 2021.
- Wanjiku, E.K., Waceke, J.W., Wanjala, B.W. and Mbaka, J.N., 2020. Identification and Pathogenicity of Fungal Pathogens Associated with Stem End Rots of Avocado Fruits in Kenya.
- Juma, W.S., Waceke, J.W. and Nchore, S.B., 2020. Diversity of Plant Parasitic Nematodes of Tree Tomato (Solanum betaceum Cav.) In Kiambu and Embu Counties, Kenya. Middle East J, 9(3), pp. 605–616.
- Onduso, J.N., Muthomi, J.W., Mutitu, E.W., Kathimba, F.K., Kimani, P.M., Kiriika, L.M., Narla, R.D., Mulugo, L., Kibwika, P., Kyazze, F.B. and Omondi, B.A., 2018. Management of bacterial wilt of tomato using resistant rootstocks.
- Horn, L.N. and Shimelis, H.A., 2018. Importance of cowpea production, breeding and production constrains under dry areas in Africa. RUFORUM Working Document series, 17(1), pp. 499–514.
- Waceke, J.W., 2018. Response of Common Beans Varieties to a Mixed Population of Root Knot Nematodes (Meloidogyne spp) in Central Highlands of Kenya.
- Nchore, S.B., Waceke, J.W., Buttner, C., Omwoyo, O. and Ulrichs, C., 2016. Efficacy of soil solarization and selected organic amendments for the control of root-knot nematodes in African nightshades. In Fifth African Higher Education Week and RUFORUM Biennial Conference 2016," Linking agricultural universities with civil society, the private sector, governments and other stakeholders in support of agricultural development in Africa, Cape Town", South Africa, 17–21 October 2016 (pp. 771–777). RUFORUM.
- Mwangi, J.M., Kariuki, G.M., Waceke, J.W. and Grundler, F.M., 2015. First report of Globodera rostochiensis infesting potatoes in Kenya. New Disease Reports, 31, pp. 18–18.
- Muturi, J., Gichuki C., Waceke J. W., Runo S.M.2010 Use of Isoenzyme phenotypes to characterize the major root – knot nematodes (Meloidogyne spp.) parasitizing indigenous leafy vegetables in Kisii Kenya. In “Transforming Agriculture for improved livelihoods through Agricultural Product Value Chains: The Proceedings of the 12th KARI Biennial Scientific Conference”8- 12th Nov 2010 Nairobi Kenya Pg. 605–612
- Kavuluko J. M., C. Gichuki, J.W. Waceke and S.M. Runo 2010. Characterization of root-knot nematodes (Meloidogyne spp.) from selected legumes in Mbeere District Kenya using isoenzyme phenotypes. In “Transforming Agriculture for improved livelihoods through Agricultural Product Value Chains: The Proceedings of the 12th KARI Biennial Scientific Conference”8- 12th Nov 2010 Nairobi Kenya Pg. 92- 97
- Luambano, N., B.R. Kerry, J.W. Kimenju, R.D. Narla and Waceke J.W. 2009. Screening of locally available organic materials for the mass production of a biological agent, Pochonia chlamydosporia, used against root-knot nematodes in the 5th International Congress of Nematology proceedings
- Waceke J. W. and J. W. Kimenju 2007. Intensive Subsistence Agriculture: Impacts, Challenges and Possible Interventions. Dynamic Soil, Dynamic Plant 1(1): 43–53
- Waceke J. W. 2007. Plant parasitic nematodes associated with cabbages in Kenya. In The African Crop Science Conference Proceedings Vol. 8 (2), 27–31 October 2007, El- Minia- Egypt. Pg. 1071–1074
- Waceke, J. W., Arim, J. O., Waudo, S. W. and Kimenju, J. W. 2007. Impact of some soil fertility management practices on lesion nematodes of maize in Kenya. First Biennual Meeting of the Regional Universities Forum for Capacity Building In Agriculture, 23 – 27 April 2007, Mangochi, Malawi. Pp 179 – 186
- H.A.L.Talwana, J.W. Kimenju, Z. Sibanda, Waceke .J. W, S.R. Gowen, D.J. Hunt and B.R.Kerry. 2006. Sustainable management of nematodes in east and southern Africa requires capacity building in the region. XXVIII International Symposium of the European Society of Nematologists
- Arim, J. O., Waceke, J.W., Waudo, S. W. and Kimenju, J. W. 2006. Effects of Canavalia ensiformis and Mucuna pruriens intercrops on Pratylenchus zeae damage and yield of maize in subsistence agriculture. Plant and Soil 284(1–2), 243 – 251
- Waceke, J.W. 2006. A Review –Arbuscular Mycorrhizal Fungi (AMF) inoculum production for use in horticulture .Journal of Tropical Microbiology and Biotechnology Vol. 2(1) 2006: 45–51. http://www.ajol.info/viewarticle.php?jid=259&id=27921
- Waceke, J. W., Bumbarger D. J., Mundo-Ocampo, M., Subbotin, S. A. and Baldwin, J.G. 2005. Zeldia spannata sp. n. (Nematoda: Cephalobidae) from the Mojave Desert, California. Journal of Nematode Morphology and Systematics 8 (1), 57 – 67.
