= Ndumberi =

- Location within Kenya
- Coordinates: 1°9′25″S 36°48′25″E
- Country: Kenya
- County: Kiambu County
- Elevation: 1,820 m (5,970 ft)
- Time zone: EAT
- Climate: Cfb

Ndumberi is a municipality division in Central Province, Kenya. It is located at an elevation of about 1,820 m. The surrounding catchment has a population of about 18,000. It is located 3 km NW of Kiambu, the capital of the Kiambu County.

Ndumberi is home to several individuals associated with Kenya including Githu Muigai and gospel artists such as Shiru wa GP and Betty Bayo. The area has experienced growth in residential development, with housing and local amenities contributing to its development.

Road improvements in 2008 have made this village more accessible to Nairobi. As of 2019, Ndumberi is termed as among the bedrooms of Nairobi. This is because many residential houses have sprung up in the area providing affordable rental houses for people working in town. As such, the population has increased turning the small village into a semi metropolitan area. In addition to that the area has seen an increase in investments both from the local people and also outsiders.

This changes have seen Ndumberi become a choice for many activities including political rallies, mass gathering, religious gathering, concerts as well as conferences. This has made Ndumberi stadium popular even though it's of low standards. Moreover Ndumberi has seen visitors come and go leading to the spring up of renowned joins and clubs to offer hospitality to the guests this includes L8, conteina, club coconut, Sam's pavilion as well as guests houses. L8 has proven to be more famous with visitors attracting more searches online including Google maps.

Entertainment is not the only thing that has sprung up in Ndumberi. The area has become quite industrious attracting investment in areas including farm products, processing, transport, food among others. Ndumberi Dairy Farmers Co-operative is one such example, producing Winners Yoghurt, which is distributed to supermarkets and shops country wide. Winners Yoghurt has enabled the organization to buy more milk from local farmers. Another addition to the micro economy in Ndumberi has been animal feed products. Several small businesses have sprung up providing a variety of animals feeds. One such example, Happy Feeds[1] that has provided employment opportunities for the local people.

== Ndumberi Coffee Growers Co-Operative Society ==
The town is surrounded by hilly Kikuyu farmland, mostly coffee and tea plantations. About 20% of the coffee production comes from small-share landowners and co-operatives. One of these is the Ndumberi Coffee Cooperative, which was inaugurated by Kenya's first president Jomo Kenyatta when it was formed in 1960. Mars Drinks purchases its beans from this co-operative to produce Kenyan Dawn, a self-billed "sustainable coffee choice." It has wet mills in Ndumberi, Riabai and Ngaita. In 2006, the company launched their sustainable coffee chain and started the Ndumberi Coffee Improvement Project. In addition to improving farming conditions with new equipment and facilities, Mars Drinks helped the co-op become UTZ Certified. This worldwide certification program sets a standard for responsible coffee production and sourcing.

== PEFA Mercy Medical Centre ==
In August 2007, PEFA Mercy Medical Centre opened in Ndumberi as another regional clinic. Operated by PEFA (Pentecostal Evangelical Fellowships of Africa) Mercy Ministries as an outreach of the Kiambu Central PEFA Brethren, the clinic was supplied by donations from Boise Idaho through the work of Genesis World Mission, Hands of Hope Northwest, Eagle (Idaho) Nazarene Church, Capital Christian Center, and Compassion International - Australia. The partnership between PEFA and some of these organizations extends back to 2003 when annual medical camps were held in Ndumberi, as well as 48 km northwest of Ndumberi in Kirasha (Kamae). A nearby forest camp in the Kieni forest is home to over 4000 internally displaced people who are poverty stricken. Their plight is exacerbated by the government's forcible removal from the forest and relocation to a 3-acre (12,000 m^{2}) plot. Expansion International, formed in Meridan Idaho, started in 2008 with intentions to develop projects in Ndumberi and other places in Kenya.

== Ndumberi Golf Club ==
The Ndumberi Golf Club and Sports Ground, popularly known as St. Andrews, has the distinction of being a football field, as well as a golf course, and was formed in 1963. It has produced several well-known Kenyan golfers. It is located along Kiambu road, but not in Ndumberi itself per se. In 2008, residents complained that the Kiambu Municipal Government destroyed part of the Sports Ground as part of improvements going on in the area.
