= Ndenderu =

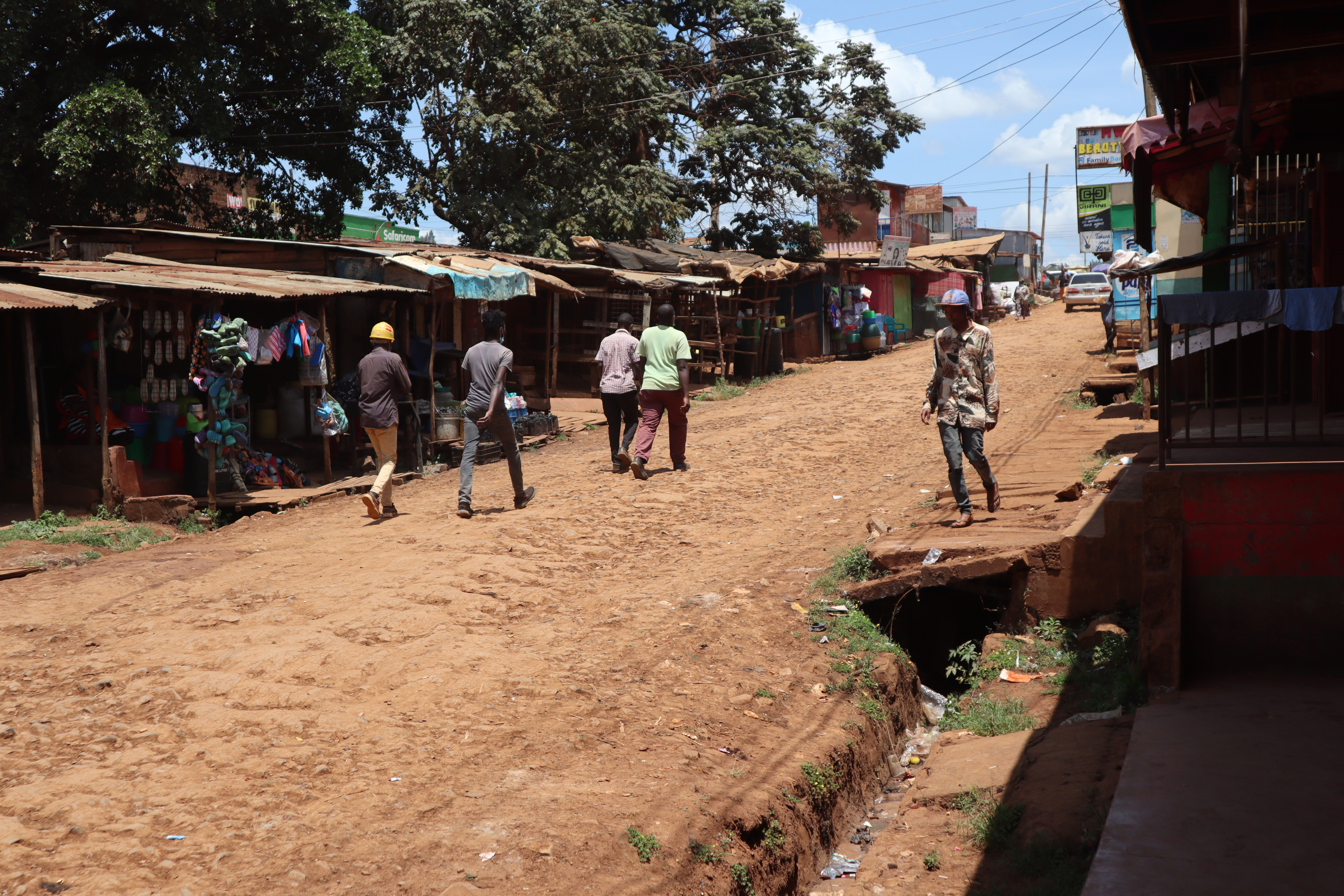

- Location within Kenya
- Coordinates: 1.18°S 36.75°E
- Country: Kenya
- Province: Central Province

Government
  - MCA (Member of County Assembly): Mwaura

Population (30/9/2010)
  - Total: 2,349
- Time zone: UTC+3 (EAT)

Ndenderu is a settlement in Kenya's Central Province. It sits along the very leafy cold sides of Limuru. It's a ward(location) in Kiambaa Constituency Constituency of Kiambu County Represented by Solomon Kinuthia.

== Demographics ==
The region is predominantly inhabited by the Kikuyu tribe. It has a booming population as it's part of the larger Nairobi Metropolitan Area. It lies 15 km north of Nairobi, the capital of Kenya.
