= Geoffrey William Griffin =

Geoffrey William Griffin OBE
- Born: 13 June 1933; Eldoret
- Died: 28 June 2005 (aged 72)
- Known for: Founding director of Starehe Boys' Centre and School

Geoffrey William Griffin OBE was the founding director of Starehe Boys' Centre and School in Kenya. He founded the centre in November, 1959 with the help of Geoffrey Gatama Geturo and Joseph Kamiru Gikubu. He was director of the centre from its founding to his death in 2005. He was also the founding director of the National Youth Service between 1964 and 1988.

In addition to their duties at Starehe Centre, Griffin and Geturo were appointed (and re-appointed) members of Kenya's Central Probation Commission. The Commission was a group appointed by Daniel arap Moi, the second President of Kenya, who at the time of the 1974 Commission was acting in his capacity as Vice-President and Minister for Home Affairs, a ministry responsible for all non-foreign affairs of the country.

== Education ==
Griffin had his primary education at Kitale School, where he then proceeded for high school at The Prince of Wales School, Nairobi, Kenya between 1945-1950, (which later changed its name to Nairobi School)

After leaving school before completing the additional two years of advanced high school required for admission to university in Kenya, he first joined the Survey of Kenya, and then the King's African Rifles (KAR). After serving during the Emergency, and tired of the brutality of war, he became convinced of the justice of the Mau Mau cause. He did not renew his commission, and started participating in attempts to rehabilitate former fighters that were held or recently released from detention camps. After a couple of years, his attention turned to children orphaned by the war, and he started a rescue centre, out of which grew another school, Starehe.

== Honours ==
Griffin was awarded an honorary Ph.D. in Education by Kenyatta University for developing Starehe Boys' Centre and School.

He was awarded the MBS (Moran of the Order of the Burning Spear) by President Kenyatta in 1970, the MGH (Moran of the Order of the Golden Heart) by President Daniel arap Moi in 1986, appointed an Officer in the Order of the British Empire (OBE) by Queen Elizabeth II in 2002, and a Lifetime Achievement Award by the Kenya National Commission on Human Rights in 2005.

== Starehe Boys' Centre ==
Griffin, together with Joseph Kamiru Gikubu and Geoffrey Gatama Geturo, founded Starehe Boys' Centre in July, 1959. The Centre then only had two huts erected by donation from the Shell-BP Petroleum Company, which served as dormitories for the first waifs brought in from the streets. Kenya was going through a challenging time under the Emergency Regulations declared in 1952. It was amid suspicion and even hostility from some of the authorities, local people and the first boys themselves that the Centre was officially opened on 14 November 1959.

Starehe offers free education to many orphaned and poor African children, on a model similar to Christ's Hospital. The Centre claims several distinguished alumni, including: Raphael Tuju, former cabinet minister and current secretary general of the Jubilee party; Paul Ereng, Olympic gold Medalist; Dr. Amrose Misore, former Senior Deputy Director of Medical Services, and by 2010 Project Director of PATH's USAID-funded AIDS Population & Health Integrated Assistance Program (APHIA) II Western; and late Prof. George Magoha, Medical Surgeon & Urologist, was Vice-Chancellor of the University of Nairobi and former Minister of Education, are Old Stareheans.

== Death ==
Geoffrey Griffin died on 28 June 2005, at the Nairobi Hospital at the age of 72 after succumbing to Colon Cancer. He had led Starehe for 46 years. He was buried on 8 July 2005 inside the chapel of Starehe Boys Centre and School.

Griffin was remembered and praised by the then President of the Republic of Kenya in a eulogy delivered at his burial ceremony.

The late Geoffrey Griffin's final words were read to the students during the burial ceremony, saying: "Happy are those who dream dreams and are willing to make the sacrifices to make them come true."

== Remembrance ==
On 19 June 2009, President Mwai Kibaki launched The Griffin Memorial Endowment Trust to cater to the educational needs of bright but needy children.

On Saturday, 21 July 2018, during the 59th Founders’ Day Celebration at Starehe Boys Centre, Nairobi County Governor Mike Sonko renamed Ngara Ring Road to Dr. Geoffrey William Griffin Road in honor of the founder of the Starehe Boys Centre.

== Bibliography ==
- Geoffrey Griffin (1994) School Mastery: Straight Talk About Boarding School Management in Kenya, (Nairobi: Lectern Publications).
- Roger Martin (1978) Anthem of bugles: the story of Starehe Boys Centre and School, (Nairobi, London : Heinemann Educational).
- Kennedy O.A. Hongo & Jesse N.K. Mugambi (2000) Starehe Boys Centre: School and Institute. The first forty years 1959-1999 (Nairobi: Acton Publishers)
