= Starehe Boys' Centre and School =

School in Nairobi, Kenya

Coordinates: 1°16′50″S 36°50′25″E

Starehe Boys Centre and School

Information
- Established: 14 November 1959
- Founders: Geoffrey William Griffin Geoffrey Gatama Geturo Joseph Kamiru Gikubu
- Website: https://www.stareheboyscentre.ac.ke

Starehe Boys' Centre and School (popularly known as "Starehe") is a partial-board, boys-only school in Nairobi, Kenya. The school was founded in 1959 by Dr. Geoffrey William Griffin, MBS, OBE, Geoffrey Gatama Geturo and Joseph Kamiru Gikubu. It started as a rescue centre in Nairobi. The school is a member of the Round Square network of schools.

== Status ==
Starehe Boys' Centre and School educates at least 70% of its students for free, and the rest at a reduced rate. This stems from its founding charter as a charitable school. School fees are paid on a means-tested basis, with substantial subsidies paid by the school, so that students from all walks of life are able to have a public school education that would otherwise be beyond their means.

The entrance process uses results from the national KCPE exams and prefers to award school places to those who show academic potential.

The school is governed by a Managing Committee chaired by David Mureithi, Former Managing Director of Unilever East and Southern Africa, former Managing Director of Unilever West Africa, and Executive Vice President of Vivo Energy. Vivo Energy Kenya (formerly Kenya Shell) is one of the school's main sponsors since its inception.

=== Admissions ===
Admission of students is by open competitive examination. Each year, approximately 20,000 applications are received; only 250 are selected to join the student body, and about six places are reserved for very needy situations where the applicant might not have had the opportunity to apply but is still meritorious.

Candidates are judged according to need and parental income, and their performance in the national KCPE examinations. Selection is solely on merit.

== History ==
Starehe Boys' Centre was the result of the vision of Geoffrey William Griffin, assisted by Joseph Gikubu, and Geoffrey Geturo. Its genesis was the earlier State of Emergency declared by the Governor of Colonial Kenya during the 1952 Mau Mau Uprising and the resultant overflow on to the streets of poor and destitute Mau Mau orphans.

The first 17 boys entered the school from Kariokor Rescue Centre, Nairobi, and it was established in two tin huts donated by Kenya Shell and BP in 1959. After a few months it moved to its current location at Starehe, Nairobi.

The name "Starehe" is Swahili for 'Tranquility', 'Peace', or 'Comfort', signifying a place where orphaned boys could find solace in its humble beginnings. It is also the name of the place in which the institution is situated.

The school is a member of the international Round Square school organisation, offering education to children from diverse backgrounds, many of whom are poor.

== Accommodation ==
Students take 'githeri' (mixture of beans and maize), a staple of the school since its inception. Starehe's education places emphasis on academic excellence as well as duty and discipline. An inscription at the Assembly Hall entrance reads "the path of Duty is the way to Glory".

Students perform daily duties that include cleaning their dormitories and the school compound as well as classes and laboratories. These duties are assigned and supervised by the prefects.

== Discipline ==
Starehe follows a rank-based prefect system. A student may become a prefect from the second year at the school but never are full prefects. They only bear the rank of sub-prefect and are so confirmed during assembly where the Director announces their promotion. Promotion through the ranks is assessed by School Prefects (normally referred to as House Captains), who form the Cabinet of the School. Any potential prefect is vetted by the Cabinet, which consists of the School Prefects, the School Captains and the Director.

Commoners are divided according to year. Those in Form One and Two are Junior Boys, Form Three and Four are Senior boys. Starehe also has a technical training institute called Starehe Technical Training Institute for post Secondary education. Starehe Institute students are referred to as "Form Five's".

When corporal punishment was legal in Kenya, only the Director was allowed to use the cane at Starehe. This was so that he kept abreast of all serious offences in the school.

Dr. Griffin took issue with the government's ban on caning, saying the government was bowing to international pressure and that little thought had been given to the implications. It would lead to an escalation in indiscipline and a decline in educational standards, he said.

== Notable alumni ==
- Paul Ereng – Olympic Gold Medallist – 1988 Seoul Summer Olympics – 800m
- Peter Kenneth – Former Assistant Minister in the Ministry of State for Planning, National Development and Vision 2030, former MP for Gatanga Constituency, presidential candidate in Kenya's 2013 election
- George Magoha - Immediate former Kenyan cabinet secretary for education
- Kinuthia Murugu – Permanent Secretary, Ministry of Youth and Sports
- Peter Ndegwa – Chief Executive Officer of Safaricom since 1 April 2020.
- Ken Okoth – a Kenyan politician who served as the Member of Parliament for Kibra Constituency from 2013 to 26 July 2019 when he died from complications caused by colorectal cancer.
- Raphael Tuju – former Minister of Foreign Affairs

== Starehe UK ==
Starehe UK was founded in 1970 to help support Starehe Boys' Centre. In 1994–1996 it raised over £1M through the Aim High Appeal to establish an endowment fund in the UK for the Centre. It has supported Starehe Girls' Centre since its founding. 2009 was the fiftieth anniversary of the Starehe Boys' Centre. The Girls' Centre was opened in 2005.

== See also ==
- The Save the Children Fund Film
