= Gachie =

- Location within Kenya
- Coordinates: 1.22°S 36.78°E
- Country: Kenya
- Province: Kiambu County

Population
  - Total: 27,487
- Time zone: UTC+3 (EAT)

Gachie is a locality in Kihara ward, Kiambaa constituency, Kiambu county. It is located in Kenya's Kiambu County approximately 14 kilometres (9 mi) from the Nairobi CBD. It neighbors the affluent Nyari Estate. Gachie is named after one of its first settlers and a son of Kihara.

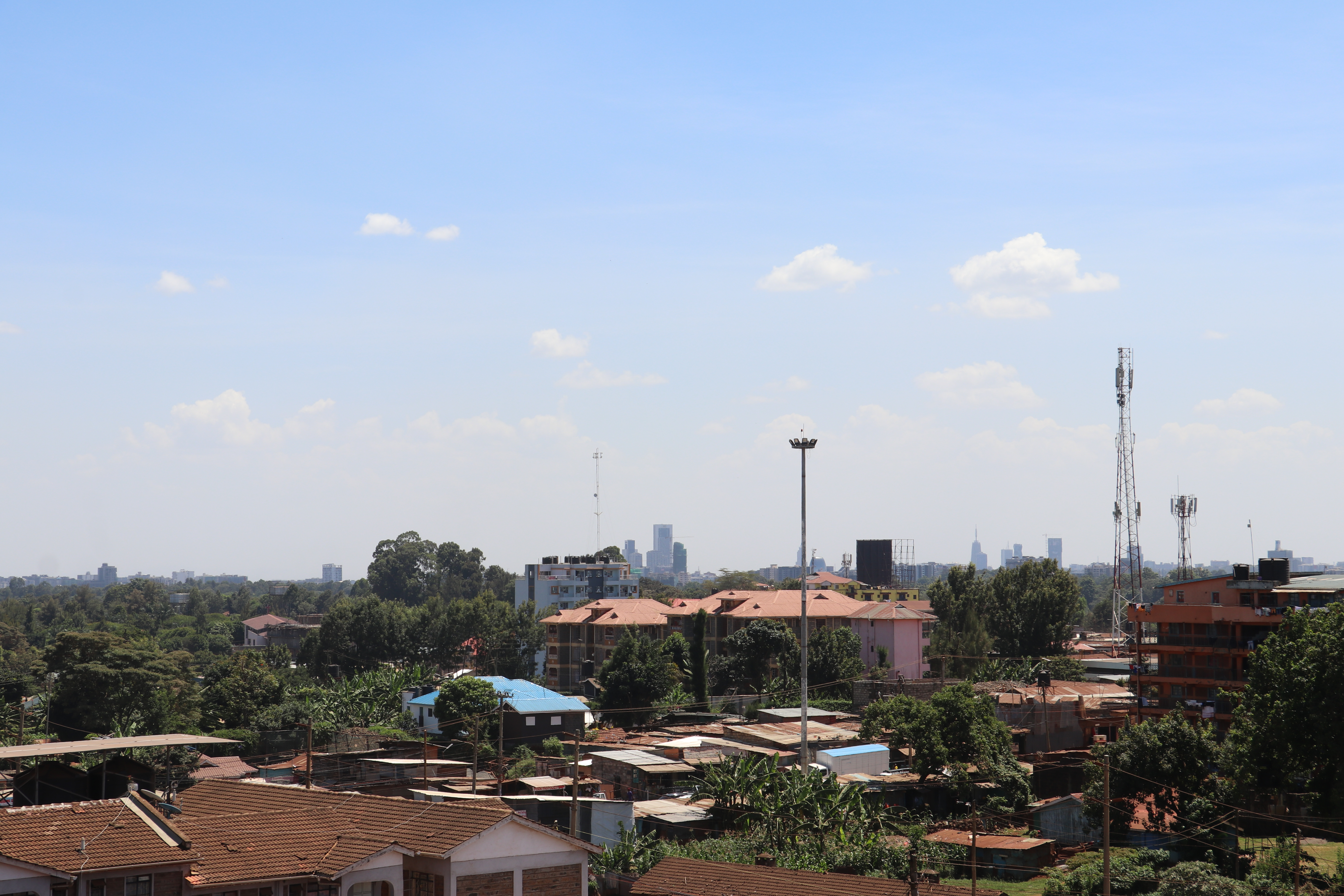
Skyline of Nairobi Viewed from Above St. James ACK Church Gachie

Being within The Nairobi outskirts, Gachie offers more than meets the eye. To some the dust was hectic, to the old the village is chill and lovely, to the community it is a peaceful environment.

In 2013, Gachie and Kihara areas were enjoying a steady demand for property. Another research paper by the University of Nairobi Digital Repository said "The area (Gachie) which was previously rural in character has changed and is now acquiring an urban character".
