= Kaloleni, Nairobi =

Suburb of Nairobi, Kenya

Kaloleni
- Location of Kaloleni in Kenya
- Coordinates: 1°17′43″S 36°50′41″E
- Country: Kenya
- County: Nairobi City
- Sub-county: Makadara

Area
  - Total: 0.6 km^{2} (0.23 sq mi)

Population (2019)
  - Total: 16,761
  - Density: 30,257/km^{2} (78,370/sq mi)

Kaloleni is a residential neighbourhood in the city of Nairobi. It is approximately 3 kilometres (1.9 mi) southeast of the central business district of Nairobi. It is one of the oldest estates in Nairobi, having been completed in the 1940s.

== Location ==
Kaloleni is located approximately 3 kilometres (1.9 mi) southeast of Nairobi's central business district. It is straddled by Jogoo Road to the south. It borders other neighbourhoods such as Makongeni and Industrial Area.

== Overview ==
Following recommendations by Sir Charles Mortimer, who chaired the African Housing Committee (AHC), conception of Kaloleni began as early as 1927. Its initial stages of the estate's design was greatly influenced by Garden City Concept, although the final blueprint was informed by the template created by American urban planner Clarence Perry based on his concept, the Neighbourhood Unit. The estate was built in the 1940s by the Italian prisoners of the war. The bungalows were built of stone, roofed with Mangalore tiles, and floors finished with cement screed.

Kaloleni Social Hall was completed with the same design as the bungalows but was bigger. It is at Kaloleni Social Hall that social and political meetings were convened in an effort to push for independence.

Kaloleni was completed in the 1948 and gifted to World War II veterans, the King's African Rifles. The neighbourhood has remained relatively unchanged but the houses have become dilapidated and in need of renovation. Kaloleni residents have put up informal extensions, and rented them out for extra income.
