= Kiambu =

- Municipality
- Location within Kenya
- Coordinates: 1°10′S 36°49′E
- Country: Kenya
- County: Kiambu County

Population (2019)
  - Urban: 147,870
- Time zone: UTC+3 (EAT)

Kiambu is a town in Kiambu County, Kenya. It is 14 km (8.7 mi) from the national capital, Nairobi. It is the capital of Kiambu County, which bounds the northern border of Nairobi. Other proximate towns are Ruiru, Gatundu, Limuru and Kabete.

== Administration ==
Apart from central Kiambu, there are villages such as Ndumberi, Ting'ang'a, Riabai, Kihingo, Ngegu, Kanunga, and Kangoya among others. The town's administration is under the County Government of Kiambu, which came into force with the promulgation of Kenya's constitution in 2010. Kiambu is also the centre of Kiambu Town Constituency, an administrative division and electoral constituency of Kiambu subcounty.

== Infrastructure ==
Kiambu and its surrounding areas have experienced residential real estate development, including projects such as Migaa, Riverside Estate, Edenville Estate, Runda Palm Estate, Runda Paradise Estate, Tatu City, Village of Kenya Estate, Hidden Creek Estate and Fourways Junction.

Kiambu Club was established in 1916 and has a nine-hole golf course, tennis courts and swimming pools. The club's main lounge is named in honour of Mama Ngina Kenyatta, Kenya's first First Lady, who has been an honorary member of the club.

== Education ==
In the outskirts of Kiambu town is Kiambu High School, a nationally recognized boarding school for its performance in academics and sports.

Other high-performance schools are ACK St.James Academy inside the town's metropolitan and St.Ann Gichocho

There is also a science college i.e. Kiambu Institute of Science and Technology.

Other upcoming colleges are Pettans Driving and Computer College and Dykaan College

== Religion ==
Churches in the town include ACK St.James Cathedral Kiambu, St.Peter and Paul Catholic Church, PCEA Kiambu church, Word of Faith Kiambu Church, AIC Kiambu Church etc. Most of the population in Kiambu are Christians and a small percentage are either Muslims, Massais, Njemps, and Arabs.

== Notable people ==
The marathon runner Pauline Njeri Kahenya was born here in 1985.
