= Pre-independence schools in Kenya =

Pre-independence schools in Kenya with institutionalised education began before the country became independent of British colonialism in 1963, with some 80 schools having been established by various groups and for various communities.

== Pre-independence schools for ethnic Africans ==
When the British colonised Kenya in 1896, they claimed to be bringing civilisation to the Africans, yet they provided only minimal education — education that was intended to make Kenyan students efficient servants of their white masters. Many schools for ethnic Africans were established by missionaries, who also collaborated with the colonial government. However, some were also started through local community initiatives.

1. Rabai Mission School (1846): established in the current Kilifi County by missionaries Johann Ludwig Krapf and Johannes Rebmann from the Anglican Church Mission Society. The site is the current location of Isaac Nyondo Primary School. Isaac Nyondo was a local ethnic African and assistant of Johann Krapf.
2. United Methodist School (1862): (later in 1963 the co-educational Ribe Secondary School, in 1989 Ribe Boys and Ribe Girls High Schools), established at Ribe, Kilifi County
3. The Mary Leakey Girls' High School (1901): established at Kabete as a co-educational mission school by Rev. A. W. McGregor of the Church Mission Society (CMS), and later named after the founder of the girls' section, Mary Bazett Leakey
4. Friends Africa Industrial Mission (1903): (later Kaimosi Friends Elementary School in 1904, now Kaimosi Friends Primary School), established in Kaimosi, Nandi County by American Quaker missionaries
5. Maseno School (1906): established in Maseno by the Missionaries of the Church Missionary Society (CMS) for the children of local ethnic chiefs, currently sponsored by the Anglican Church of Kenya (ACK) and overseen by the Diocese of Maseno South
6. Nyeri High School (1907): established in Nyeri as a primary school along with the neighbouring St. Paul Seminary and the Mathari Mission Hospital by the Consolata Missionary Sisters
7. Tumutumu Mission School (1908): (now Tumutumu Girls' High School and Kagumo Teachers College) established as a co-ed primary school in Nyeri County by the Church of Scotland Mission
8. Kabare School (1911): (from 1964 Kabare Girls High School), established by the Church Mission Society in Gichugu, Kirinyaga County, after area coffee farmers agreed to each contribute two cents per half kilogramme of cherry thereby raising over KES 80,000, to form Kabare School (for girls) and Mutige School (for boys).
9. Mutige School (1911): (later Mutige Boys School), established by the Church Mission Society in Gichugu, Kirinyaga County, after area coffee farmers agreed to each contribute two cents per half kilogramme of cherry thereby raising over KES 80,000, to form Mutige School (for boys) and Kabare School (for girls).
10. Government African School Machakos (1915): formed as a boys' primary school, from 1946 a co-educational primary school. In 1950 the boys' section relocated to become Machakos School; the girls section was renamed Government African Girls’ Intermediate School, which gave rise to today's Machakos Girls' High School
11. Butere Girls High School (1916): founded as a primary school in Butere, Kakamega County by the Irish missionary Jane Elizabeth Chadwick (Church Mission Society, CMS)
12. Kabaa High School (1923): established by the Catholic Church in Machakos County
13. Harambee Waa School (1923): (later Waa Boys High School), established in Kwale County by missionaries of the Holy Ghost Catholic Fathers
14. Ng'iya Girls High School (1923): first established as a primary school in Siaya County, later (1953) a teacher training college, then a secondary school in 1962
15. Central Training School for Catechists (1925): (later Catholic Central School and Kabaa School, now Mang'u High School), established in Thika by Dutch priest Michael Joseph Witte (from the Holy Ghost Fathers)
16. Government African School Kapsabet (1925): established in Nandi County by the Africa Inland Mission; today Kapsabet High School and Kapsabet Girls' High School (from 1951)
17. Jeanes School Kabete (1925): (later Public Service Management and Development Institute plus Kenya Medical Training College in 1961, Kenya Institute of Administration in 1963, and in 2012 Kenya School of Government), established in Kabete
18. Alliance School (1926): now Alliance High School, established as a junior secondary school by the Alliance of Protestant Missions
19. Francis Scott High School (1927): (later in 1963 Nakuru High School plus Nakuru Girls Secondary School in 1961)
20. St. Mary's School Yala (1927): founded by the Roman Catholic Mill Hill Missionaries
21. Ruthimitu Independent School (1929): boys' school in Dagoretti, Nairobi, later Waithaka Independent School (1939), currently Dagoretti High School (1962)
22. Kisii School (1932): established Kisii, Kenya
23. Government African School Kakamega (1932): (later Kakamega High School, now Kakamega School)
24. Kagumo High School (1933): established as a primary institution in Gatitu to train artisans; relocated to Kiganjo, Nyeri County in 1958
25. MaryHill Girls' High School (1933): established in Thika town, Kiambu County by the Catholic Missionary Sisters of Our Lady of Africa (White Sisters)
26. Buxton School (1935): (later Ronald Ngala Primary School), established by the Church Mission Society in Mombasa
27. Gaiteiguru Intermediary School (1938): (today Our Lady Consolata Mugoiri Girls High School), established by the Consolata Missionary Sisters in Mugoiri, Murang'a County
28. Kangaru schools (1947): in Embu County, established as a Church Mission Society primary school, later Government African Teacher Training Center and Secondary School (G.A.T.T.C. & S.S) in 1952, and African Girls Intermediate School (GAGI) in 1953. Embu Girls High School was fused into the school in July 1973, separating again in 1989
29. African Girls High School (1948): (now Alliance Girls High School) established in Kikuyu town, Kiambu County by the Alliance of Protestant Missions.
30. Jeanes School Maseno (1956): later Maseno Training Centre (1961), Maseno Government Training Institute (1967), in 1990 merged with Siriba Teachers' College to form Maseno University College, today Maseno University (since 2001)
31. Gitoro Technical (1956): later Meru Technical School (1964), Meru Technical Vocational Training School (1969), Meru Technical Secondary School (1973), Meru Technical Training Institute (1986), Meru National Polytechnic (2016). Originally established in Meru town by the local town council to train youth in various practical skills
32. Xaverian Primary School (1956): established in Kisumu County
33. Kahuhia Girls' High School (1957): established in Kahuhia, Murang'a County through an initiative by the local community and Christian missionaries
34. Starehe Boys' Centre and School (November 1959): established by Dr. Geoffrey William Griffin, Geoffrey Gatama Geturo and Joseph Kamiru Gikubu in Starehe, Nairobi
35. Cardinal Otunga High School Mosocho (1960): established in Kisii County following a request from the then Kisii Diocese Bishop, His Eminence Maurice Otunga
36. Bishop Gatimu Ngandu Girls High School (1960): established by The Right Reverend Caesar Gatimu in Karatina, Nyeri County
37. Baricho High School (1960): established in Ndia, Kirinyaga County by The Right Reverend Caesar Gatimu
38. Chebokokwa School (1961): (now St. Patrick's High School Iten), established by the Patrician Brothers in Iten, Elgeyo-Marakwet County, and currently operated by the Roman Catholic Diocese of Eldoret
39. Kianyaga High School (1961): boys' school established in Gichugu, Kirinyaga County through fundraisers by local elders.
40. St Paul’s Amukura High School (1962): boys' school established in Busia County by the Catholic Church

== Pre-independence schools for Muslims and ethnic Arabs ==
The local coastal communities were the primary driver in the establishment of their schools.

1. Arab Boys' Primary School Mombasa (1920s): established in Mombasa
2. Shimo La Tewa School (1932): (later Coast African Secondary School, then Shimo-La-Tewa High School), established in Shanzu, Mombasa City as secondary school for Arab boys who has successfully completed their primary education at the Arab Boys' Primary School Mombasa
3. Mombasa Institute of Muslim Education - MIOME (1948): (later in 1966 Mombasa Technical Institute - MTI, from 2007 Mombasa Polytechnic University College - MPUC, from 2013 Technical University of Mombasa), established in Mombasa to provide technical education to Muslim students of East Africa

== Pre-independence schools for ethnic Indians ==
The Colonial government was the original provider of institutionalised education for Indian children, whose families originally arrived in the East Africa Protectorate from British India as labourers and indentured servants working on the Uganda Railway. Later, various religious communities mobilised to establish schools to serve their members.

1. Arya Kanya Pathasala (1910): (today: Arya Primary School), established by the Arya Samaj community in Ngara, Nairobi at the home of a Mr. Mathura Dass
2. Indian School (1912): in Mombasa County, from which emerged Allidina Visram High School (in 1923, named after Allidina Visram) as a rehousing and secondary extension of the Indian School
3. The Aga Khan Primary School, Mombasa (1918): established as a boys' school in Kizingo, Mombasa City, from which later emerged The Aga Khan High School, Mombasa. It is operated by Aga Khan Education Services of the Shia Ismaili community of Muslims
4. The Duchess of Gloucester School (1932): (now Pangani Girls High School), established in Pangani, Nairobi
5. Nyeri Indian School (1935): (Temple Road Primary School from 1996; now Temple Road Junior School and Temple Road Secondary School) established in Nyeri Town
6. Oshwal Academy (1950): established in Parklands, Nairobi; managed by the Oshwal Education and Relief Board (OERB) of the Jain community
7. Arya Vedic School (1950): established at Puri Bhavan, Ngara, Nairobi by the Arya Samaj community. It gave rise to Arya Vedic Academy
8. Modern High School (1951): Technical High School from 1953, later Nairobi Technical Training Institute in Ngara, Nairobi
9. City High School (1952): founded in Ngara, Nairobi by the Sharma family of the Arya Samaj community
10. The Aga Khan Primary School, Kisumu (1952): established in Kisumu City. It is operated by Aga Khan Education Services of the Shia Ismaili community of Muslims
11. Parklands Arya Girls High School (1957): established in Parklands, Nairobi by the Arya Samaj community in Kenya
12. Ngara Girls' High School (1957): emerged from a co-educational school in Ngara, Nairobi along with present-day Highway Secondary School
13. Highway Secondary School (1957): emerged from a co-educational school along with Ngara Girls' High School, relocated to Nairobi's South B suburb in 1962 to become the boys' secondary school
14. The Aga Khan High School (1961): co-educational day school established in Westlands, Nairobi. It is operated by Aga Khan Education Services of the Shia Ismaili community of Muslims

== Pre-independence schools for ethnic Europeans ==
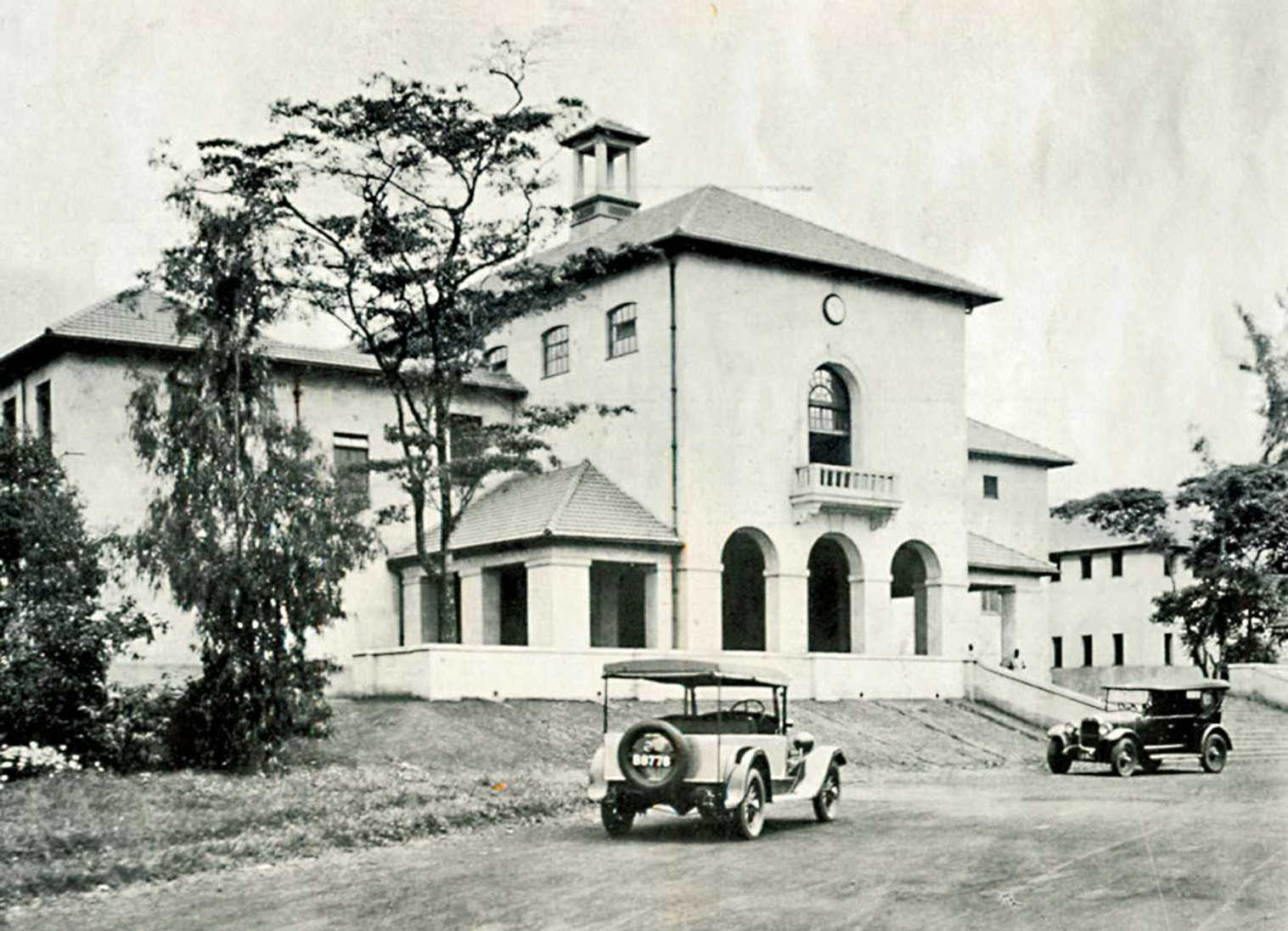
The European School, Nairobi. Birthplace of Nairobi Primary School, Nairobi School and The Kenya High School, and feeder school for Lenana School

1. Rift Valley Academy (1906): established in Kijabe town, Kiambu County as the first up-country European school by Charles Hurlburt of the Africa Inland Mission. In 1967 it was the first school in Africa to receive US-American accreditation.
2. The European School, Nairobi (1910): (now Nairobi Primary School), co-educational school which birthed the Prince of Wales School (Nairobi School) and the European Girls School (The Kenya High School)
3. Loreto Convent Msongari (1921): "Msongari" being a mispronunciation of Muthangari where the school is located in Westlands Sub-county, was established by the Sisters of Loreto
4. Hill Preparatory School (1922): (later Limuru Girls High School in 1926), established by European settler, Arnold Buttler McDonell, on his Kiambethu Farm in Limuru, Kiambu County
5. The Hill School (1923): established in Eldoret as European Primary School, later Central School then Highlands School, which in 1956 amalgamated with New Girls' Secondary School (today Moi Girls' High School, Eldoret)
6. Kenton College (January 1924): (now Kenton College Preparatory School), established as an all-boys boarding school in Kijabe, moving to Kileleshwa in 1935, taking its roots from Kenya Grange School at Lumbwa
7. Pembroke House (1927): established in Gilgil, Nakuru County. It was named after the Cambridge College attended by its founder Headmaster, Harold Turner, and has been owned by Kenya Educational Trust Limited since 1959
8. Kitale Primary (1929): (later Kitale Academy, now Kitale School) in Kitale, Trans-Nzoia County
9. St. Andrews School, Turi (1931): established in Molo, Nakuru County
10. The Prince of Wales School - TPWS (1931): later Nairobi School; emerged from The European School, Nairobi along with The European Girls School; in 1931 relocated to what was then part of Kabete (current Kitisuru Ward in Westlands Sub-County)
11. The European Girls School (1931): later The Kenya High School; emerged from The European School, Nairobi along with The Prince of Wales School; relocated to Kileleshwa in 1950
12. Mombasa European Primary School (1935): (MEPS, from 1962 Mombasa Primary School), established in Mombasa
13. Greensteds School (1936): established in Nakuru
14. Loreto High School, Limuru (December 1936): established by the Sisters of Loreto in Limuru
15. St. Mary's School, Nairobi (1939): established by the Holy Ghost Fathers from Blackrock College in Ireland; today located on the land of St. Austin’s Parish in Muthangari, Westlands Sub-county
16. Loreto Convent Valley Road (1941): established by the Sisters of Loreto in Upper Hill, Nairobi
17. Mara Hills Academy (February 1947): established in Tanganyika Territory by the Eastern Mennonite Mission and relocated to Gigiri, Nairobi in 1967 as Rosslyn Academy
18. The Duke of York School - TDYS (1949): established by colonial governor Sir Philip Euen Mitchell in Riruta Satellite, Nairobi; in 1969 renamed Lenana School after the Masaai Laibon
19. Delamere School (1956): established in Nairobi, from which emerged in 1959 as the New Girls Secondary School (later Delamere Girls High School, now State House Girls High School) and Delamere Boys High School (later Simba Secondary School, now Upper Hill School)

== Multi-ethnic schools ==
1. Railway Educational Centre (1906): established as a co-educational institution for both European and Indian workers of the Uganda Railway Authorities. Later Railway School Nairobi, then Government Indian School in 1928, later The Duke of Gloucester School for boys in 1955, since 1968 Jamhuri High School in Ngara, Nairobi
2. Strathmore College (1961): later Strathmore College of Arts and Sciences, and then the parallel Strathmore School and Strathmore College School of Accountancy. The latter merged with Kianda Secretarial College in 1993, and in 2002 became the current Strathmore University. Established under the guidance of the Opus Dei founder, Saint Josemaría Escrivá, in Muthangari, Westlands Sub-county as a residential Sixth form college and the country's first multi-ethnic plus poly-religious school; currently managed by Study Centres of Kenya
3. Kianda Secretarial College (1961): established by Kianda Foundation in Westlands Sub-County, Nairobi, in 1993 merged with Strathmore College School of Accountancy to form Strathmore University.
