= Loresho =

Residential suburb in Nairobi

- Location of Loresho in Kenya
- Coordinates: 1°14′50″S 36°45′43″E
- Country: Kenya
- County: Nairobi City
- Sub-county: Westlands
- Time zone: UTC+3

Loresho is an affluent neighbourhood in the city of Nairobi. It is approximately 7.5 kilometres (4.7 mi) northwest of the central business district of Nairobi.

== Location ==
Loresho is located approximately 7.5 kilometres (4.7 mi) northwest of Nairobi's central business district. It borders the Lower Kabete and the Kitisuru neighbourhoods. Loresho together with Kitisuru and Kyuna sub-locations form the Kitisuru Ward of Nairobi City County.

== Overview ==
Loresho is derived from the Maasai word Oloresho. The land on the present-day Loresho was a Maasai grassland prior to the 1920s, when it was taken over by the British settler Hugh Cholmondeley, 3rd Baron Delamere. Due to the high altitude, with a cool climate the area enjoyed, Cholmondeley put up an expansive coffee estate of 400 acres and built a home with views of Mount Kenya in 1928. After Cholmondeley's death in 1931, the land was auctioned and put up for sale to clear debts that he had acquired. Several African labourers who lived in the estate relocated to other places such as Kangemi.

With the breakup of the estate, settler families acquired plots and individuals' homes in Kibagare Valley. By the 1960s Loresho was managed by the Loresho Housing Company which built four-bedroom single family bungalows. Occupation started in the 1970s, for anyone who could afford the mortgage, making Loresho the first non-segregated estate in Nairobi.

Loresho is zoned as a low-density neighbourhood with single family residential units allowed to be built within the estate.

Loresho Ridge estate in Loresho is a housing project that was actualised by the Kenya Power Pension Fund that consists of 170 housing units, a commercial center and a kindergarten school.

As per the 2019 census, the Loresho location has a population of 21,036, and a population density of 2,316 per square kilometre in a land area of 9.1km^{2}.
