= Nairobi GTC Office Tower =

Building in Nairobi

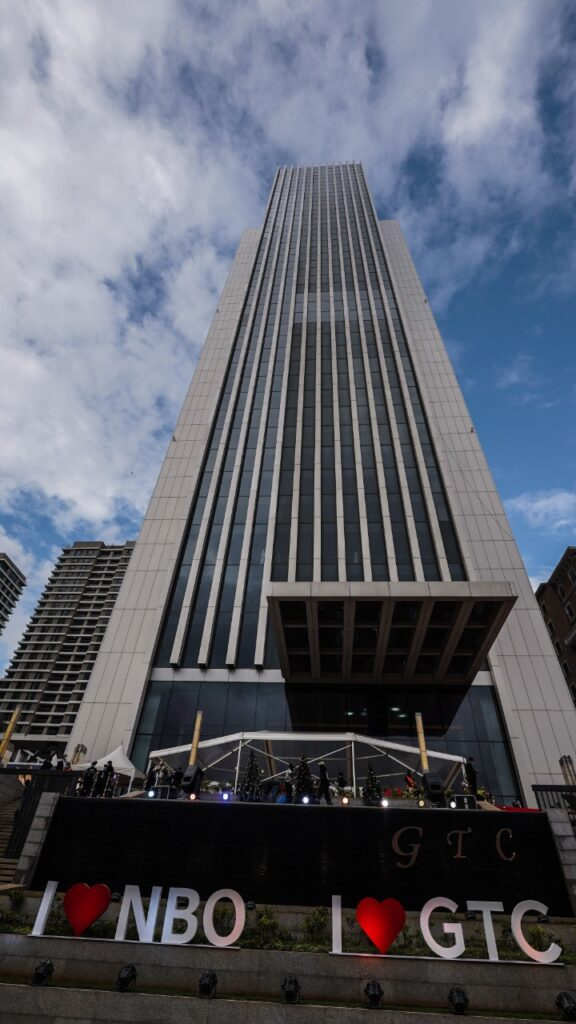

General information
- Status: Completed
- Location: Westlands, Nairobi, Kenya
- Coordinates: 1.2710817°S 36.8084200°E
- Construction started: 2015
- Completed: 2022
- Inaugurated: 23 December 2022
- Owner: [Nairobi GTC Industry Ltd.]

Height
- Height: 184 metres (604 ft)

Technical details
- Floor count: 43
- Floor area: 57,670 m^{2} (620,800 sq ft)

Design and construction
- Architects: Julius Talaam; Sujesh Patel

The Global Trade Centre Office Tower (GTC Office Tower) is the tallest of the towers at the Global Trade Centre in Nairobi owned by Nairobi GTC Industry Ltd. The skyscraper, rises 184 metres (604 ft) above ground, with 43 floors. It is the second tallest building in Kenya, as of January 2026.

== Overview ==
The GTC Tower is the main building among other mixed-use high-rises that form the Global Trade Centre. They sit on a 7.5-acre piece of land in the Westlands neighbourhood of Upper Parklands. GTC Nairobi, located along the Waiyaki Way, Westlands Road and Chiromo Lane, comprises six other imposing towers: a 42-floor 3A Plus Office Tower, a 35-floor hotel tower hosting the US chain JW Marriott hotel, and four residential flats of 24 to 28 floors. GTC also includes a 4-storey mall on the and a 3-storey retail within the GTC Office Tower The GTC Tower is located at the farthest south of all the other establishments with its front façade facing Waiyaki Way and the Nairobi Expressway.
