= Ruhila Adatia-Sood =

Kenyan radio presenter (1982–2013)

- Born: Ruhila Adatia; August 29, 1982; Kisumu, Kenya
- Died: September 21, 2013 (aged 31); Nairobi, Kenya
- Education: Rhodes University
- Occupation: Radio Africa Group presenter
- Years active: 2007–2013
- Organization: Kiss FM
- Spouse: Ketan Sood

Ruhila Adatia-Sood (29 August 1982 – 21 September 2013) was a Kenyan television and radio presenter and journalist of Indian heritage.

== Biography ==
Ruhila Adatia was born and brought up in Kisumu, Kenya. She graduated from Aga Khan Academy, Nairobi, and in 2007 from Rhodes University in Grahamstown, South Africa. Since 2007 she had worked for Kenya Radio Africa Group as a news presenter and Rankingshow Kiss 100 moderator for Kiss TV, and Metro East FM, a radio station in Nairobi aimed at Kenyan Asians. Since 2011 she was, together with Kamal Kaur, a moderator of a TV cooking show for children, recorded each month in Westgate shopping mall in Nairobi.

She was a member of Kenya's Ismaili Muslim community. In January 2012, she married Ketan Sood, a member of the USAID mission in Nairobi; the wedding took place at the Arya Samaj Temple in Parklands, Nairobi.

She was wounded in the Westgate shopping mall shooting while hosting a cooking competition for children in the centre's rooftop car park, and died on the way to the Aga Khan Hospital. At the time of her death, at the age of 31, she was six or seven months pregnant with her first child.
