= Kyuna =

Neighbourhood in Nairobi, Kenya

- Location of Kyuna in Kenya
- Coordinates: 1°15′11″S 36°46′11″E
- Country: Kenya
- County: Nairobi City
- Sub-county: Westlands

Area
  - Total: 1.2 sq mi (3 km^{2})

Population (2019)
  - Total: 6,026
  - Density: 5,100/sq mi (1,980/km^{2})
- Time zone: UTC+3

Kyuna is an affluent neighbourhood in the city of Nairobi. It is approximately 6.4 kilometres (4.0 mi) northwest of the central business district of Nairobi.

== Overview ==
Kyuna is located approximately 6.4 kilometres (4.0 mi) northwest of Nairobi's central business district. It borders the Loresho and the Spring Valley neighbourhoods. Kyuna together with Kitisuru and Loresho sub-locations form the Kitisuru Ward of Nairobi City County.

Kyuna is zoned as a low-density neighbourhood with single family residential units allowed to be built within the estate. It is an exclusive neighbourhood that is inhabited by the high-income segment of Nairobi residents.

As of 2019, Kyuna has a population of 6,026, and a population density of 1,980/km^{2} in a land area of 3 km^{2}.
