= Valley Spring =

Valley Spring may refer to:

- Valley Springs, California, United States
- Valley Spring, Texas, United States

== See also ==
- Spring Valley (disambiguation)
