= Pangani, Nairobi =

Suburb of Nairobi, Kenya

Pangani, Nairobi is a suburb of Nairobi. It is one of the oldest estates in Nairobi, and is located approximately 4 kilometres (2.5 mi), by road, northeast of Nairobi's central business district.

Pangani traditionally had a large Asian population, who have mostly either emigrated or moved to the more upmarket areas of Westlands and Parklands.

It borders Muthaiga to the north, Ngara to the west, Eastleigh to the east, and Pumwani to the south.
