= Kileleshwa =

Residential neighbourhood in Nairobi, Kenya

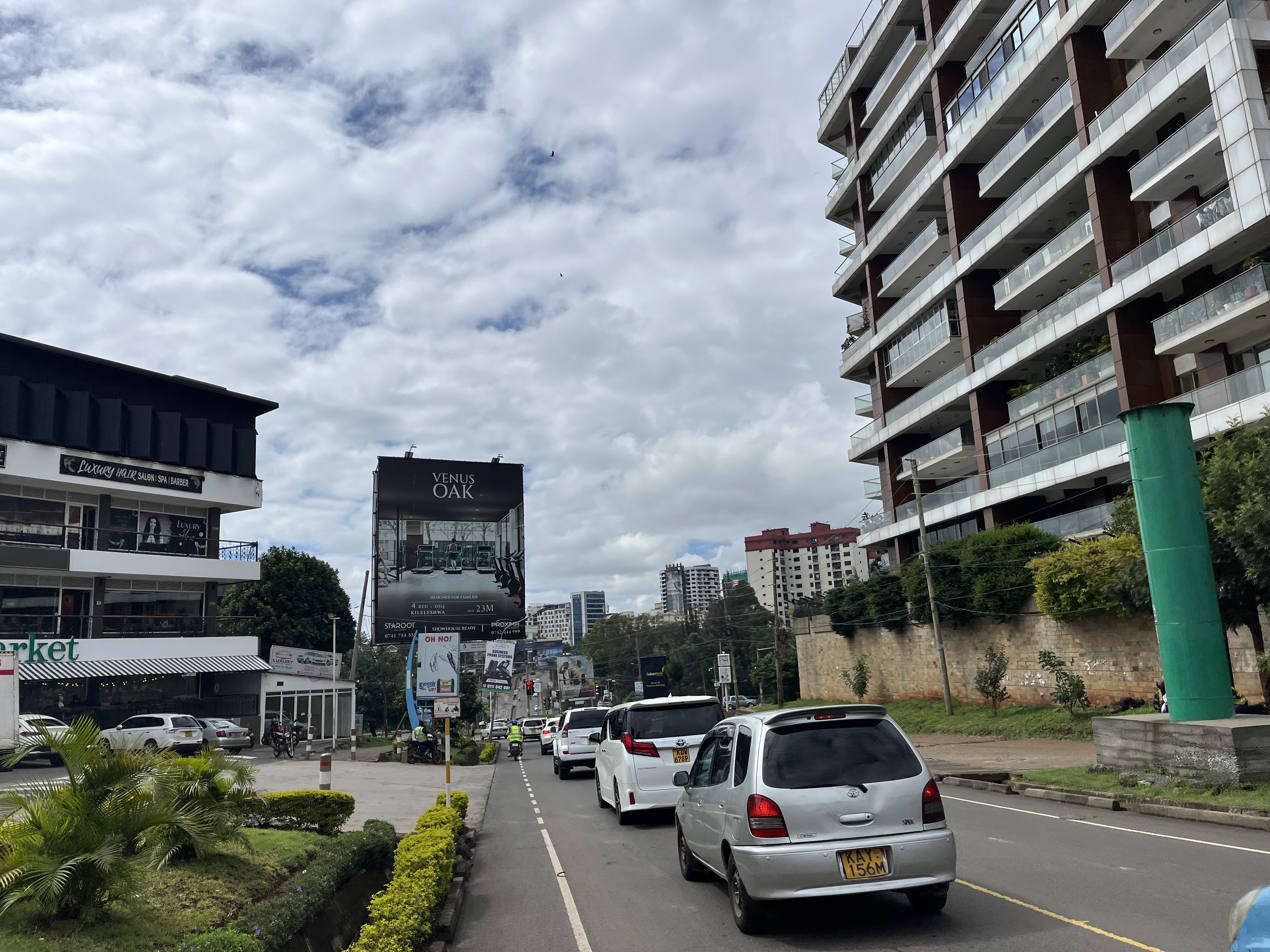

- Location of Kileleshwa in Kenya
- Coordinates: 01°16′37″S 36°47′35″E
- Country: Kenya
- County: Nairobi City
- Sub-county: Westlands

Area
  - Total: 2.0 sq mi (5.3 km^{2})

Population (2019)
  - Total: 22,216
  - Density: 10,950/sq mi (4,229/km^{2})

Kileleshwa is a residential neighbourhood in the city of Nairobi. It is located approximately 5.2 kilometres (3 mi) from Nairobi's central business district. The neighbourhood was originally a low-density leafy suburb but after a change in zoning regulations in the early 2000s, there has been significant mushrooming of high-rise flats in the area. It hosts mainly the upper middle class segment of Nairobi residents.

== Overview ==
Kileleshwa hosts a significant population of the upper middle income population of Nairobi. The neighbourhood has historically been primarily low-density residential, but since the early 2000s, Kileleshwa and its environs have become increasingly high-density mixed residential and commercial; both retail and offices, due to the zoning laws in the area being changed. Some of the high-rise buildings have been built contrary to the county's bylaws and have been characterised as vertical slums due to them burdening the existing laid infrastructure. Residents of Kilimani and Kileleshwa have also raised concerns about the increasing number of nightclubs in the areas.

In March 2024, Nairobi Governor Johnson Sakaja proposed a re-zoning that would allow the construction of buildings up to 75 floors in Kilimani, Kilelelshwa, and Lavington.

Kileleshwa, an electoral ward within the Dagoretti North Constituency, borrows its name from the estate, encompassing other estates and neighbourhoods such as: Chiromo, Groganville, Kileleshwa, Muthangari and Riverside.

As per the 2019 census, Kileleshwa had a population of 22,216, with a population density of 4,229/km^{2} in a land area of 5.3 km^{2}.

=== Restaurants, hotels, and rentals ===
Kileleshwa was historically an almost entirely residential area, with little commercial activity. Restaurants and cafés became more numerous as apartment development brought more residents to the neighbourhood.

Several former residential bungalows with gardens have been converted into popular restaurants, including Sushi Soo, Samaki Samaki and a number of more local-style garden restaurants.

Historically, Kileleshwa has had few hotels. The Emory Hotel opened in 2018 and rebranded to Swiss-Belinn Nairobi in 2024.

Short-stay furnished apartments, including Airbnb rentals, have expanded rapidly alongside residential development. While this trend has been evident across Nairobi, it has been particularly accentuated in Kileleshwa. Guests include international visitors and business travellers, in many cases staying for several months.

=== Location ===
Kileleshwa is located approximately 5 kilometres (3 mi) west of Nairobi's central business district, within the larger sub-county of Westlands. It is east of Lavington; south of Muthangari, and west of Kilimani, mainly separated by the Kirichwa River.

== History ==
The earliest documented settlement in Kileleshwa was an African settlement in the early 1900s. Residents included government workers and former civil servants cultivating land in the area. Between 1925 and 1927, African residents were evicted by the colonial government to make way for European settlement.

Kileleshwa remained a quiet, leafy residential suburb into the early 2000s, with bungalows, some low-rise apartments, and limited commercial activity.

Densification accelerated after zoning changes in 2005. Through the 2010s, growing middle-class demand drove further development. Roads completed between 2011 and 2013 improved connections to neighboring Kilimani, Lavington, and Westlands. Frequent concerns have been raised that developments approved contrary to zoning rules have strained roads, water supply and sewerage systems.

The area remains predominantly residential, with an increasing number of restaurants, cafés, and bars. The 2026 zoning rules allow buildings of up to 30 floors in Kileleshwa.

=== Real Estate Trends ===
Over the past two decades, Kileleshwa has experienced rapid urbanisation, marked by a surge in high-rise apartment buildings. Originally a low-density area, zoning law adjustments in the early 2000s allowed for more intensive development. This has led to mixed reactions from residents, with some appreciating the area's accessibility while others decry the strain on local infrastructure. The proliferation of high-rise flats has also significantly impacted property values, making Kileleshwa a popular residential area for upper-middle-class residents.

=== Name ===
The name Kileleshwa derives from oleleishwa, the Maa name for the leleshwa bush. The Maa prefix ol- was replaced by the Bantu prefix ki-, giving the name the meaning "a big bush".

== Points of interest ==
=== Schools ===
- The Kenya High School is located in Kileleshwa.
- Kenton College Preparatory School is one of the oldest preparatory schools in East Africa.

=== Parks ===
- Nairobi Arboretum adjoins Kileleshwa. the 30.4-hectare forest reserve was established in 1907 and features walking trails, picnic areas and birdwatching. It has a walk-in gate from Arboretum Drive in Kileleshwa.

=== Research institutions ===
- The British Institute in Eastern Africa conducts research in the humanities and social sciences. Its Kileleshwa research centre includes a reference library and lecture facilities.

=== Shopping centres ===
- Kasuku Centre is a neighbourhood shopping centre with shops and restaurants.
- Basic Mall houses a Quickmart supermarket, which opened in 2023.

=== Restaurants ===
- Samaki Samaki. Seafood garden restaurant with live music and jazz performances.
- Sushi Soo - a Japanese/Korean outdoor restaurant.
- Robot Cafe. Ultra-moden café with robotic waiters.
- The Wine & Bottle.
- Sesame Asian Tapas & Lounge Bar.
