= Trevor Ombija =

Kenyan Journalist

- Born: Trevor Ombija; September 9, 1988 (age 37); Kisumu, Kenya.
- Citizenship: kenyan
- Education: University of Nairobi (BA)
- Occupations: Broadcast journalist; political commentator
- Years active: 2014–present
- Employers: Nation Media Group (2014-2019); Citizen TV (2019–present)
- Notable work: Monday Report, Day Break
- Children: 1 son

Trevor Ombija (born 9 September 1988) is a Kenyan journalist who currently works for Citizen TV as the host of the channel's Monday Report and morning show Day Break.He began his media career in 2012 as an intern at China Global Television Network (CGTN) before joining Nation Media Group, where he worked as a radio presenter for Nation FM and later as a news anchor for NTV.In 2019, he transitioned to Royal Media Services, becoming one of the leading faces of Citizen TV’s political and current affairs coverage.

== Early years ==
Ombija was born on 9 September 1988 in Kisumu County, Nyanza province.He attended high school at Anding'o Opanga Secondary school in Nyanza Province and afterwards joined University of Nairobi where he obtained a Bachelor of Arts (Journalism and Media studies) between 2010 and 2013.

== Career ==
However, before journalism, Ombija worked as a Leaf Stores Clerk for DHL between 2006 and 2010. Ombija entered the field of journalism starting out for China Global Television Network in 2012 as an intern. After graduating, Ombija worked with Nation Media Group as a radio anchor for Nation FM then moved to TV where he worked for NTV as a news anchor in 2014. In 2019 Ombija moved to Citizen TV where he is currently working.

== Personal life ==
Outside of journalism and media, Ombija is an investor at Kileleshwa club, Samaki Samaki Club, and is a senior partner of Crestwood Marketing and Communications Ltd. On 20 June 2023, Ombija revealed on Instagram that he has a son.

== Awards and achievements ==
On 18 December 2020 Ombija was awarded the Head of State Commendation (HSC) award by former president Uhuru Kenyatta.
