= List of botanical gardens in Kenya =

This list of botanical gardens in Kenya is intended to include all significant botanical gardens and arboretums in Kenya.

| Garden | Location | Date established | Coordinates | Notes |
|---|---|---|---|---|
| Kaya Cum Arboretum | Bamburi | | 4°S 39.71667°E | |
| Moi University Botanic Garden | Eldoret | | 0.558516°N 35.297757°E | |
| East African Agriculture and Forestry Research Institute | Kikuyu | 1948 | 1.251629°S 36.686743°E | |
| Kenya Agricultural Research Institute | Kikuyu | | 1.251629°S 36.686743°E | |
| The Baobab Gardens | Kilifi | | 3.516001°S 39.895945°E | |
| Mutomo Hill Plant Sanctuary | Kitui | | 1.371657°S 37.993845°E | |
| Mazeras Botanical Gardens/Nursery | Mombasa | 1940 | 3.962494°S 39.549762°E | |
| Nairobi Arboretum | Nairobi | 1907 | 1.278222°S 36.803306°E | |
| Botanic Garden of the National Museums of Kenya | Nairobi | 1990 | 1.274294°S 36.813931°E | |

| Egerton University || Njoro,Nakuru || || 4°S 39.71667°E ||

== See also ==
- Protected areas of Kenya
- List of botanical gardens
- List of tourist attractions worldwide
