= Nairobi Global Trade Centre =

Building in Nairobi

Global Trade Centre
- Interactive map of the Global Trade Centre area
- Alternative names: GTC

General information
- Status: Completed
- Location: Westlands, Nairobi, Kenya
- Coordinates: 1.2710817°S 36.8084200°E
- Construction started: 2015
- Completed: 2022
- Inaugurated: 23 December 2022
- Cost: KES 40 billion
- Owner: Nairobi GTC Industry Ltd.

Height
- Height: Office Tower: 184 metres (604 ft); Hotel Tower: 143 metres (469 ft)

Technical details
- Floor count: Office Tower: 42; 3A Hotel Tower: 35; 4 Residential flats: 24–28; Boutique mall: 3
- Floor area: Office Tower: 57,670 m^{2} (620,800 sq ft)

Design and construction
- Architects: Julius Talaam; Sujesh Patel

The Global Trade Centre (GTC) is a mixed-use complex in the Westlands suburb of Upper Parklands in Nairobi owned by Nairobi GTC Industry Ltd. The establishment is set on a 7.5 acre piece of land in Westlands, comprises the Nairobi GTC Office Tower, the tallest building in Kenya, rises 184 metres (604 ft) above ground, with 42 floors.

== Overview ==
The Global Trade Centre developed as mixed-use high-rises, sits on a 7.5-acre piece of land in the Westlands neighbourhood of Upper Parklands. The GTC comprises six other imposing towers: a 42-floor Office Tower, a 35-floor hotel tower hosting the US chain JW Marriott hotel, and four residential flats of 24 to 28 floors. GTC also includes a 4-storey mall on the and a 3-storey retail within the GTC Office Tower The GTC Office Tower is sits at the furthest south of all the other establishments along Chiromo Road and the Nairobi Expressway, the rest of the complex spreads northwards and westwards along Westlands Road and both sides of Chiromo Lane.
