= Spring Valley station =

Spring Valley station may refer to:

- Spring Valley station (New York), a Metro-North Railway and NJ Transit station in Spring Valley, New York
- Spring Valley station (DART), a DART Light Rail station in Richardson, Texas
- Spring Valley station (Minnesota), a Chicago Great Western station in Spring Valley, Minnesota

== See also ==
- Spring Valley (disambiguation)
