= City High School, Nairobi =

Private secondary school in Nairobi, Kenya

Coordinates: 1.258083°S 36.767190°E

Location
- Nairobi; Kenya

Information
- Established: 1952; 73 years ago

City High School is a private secondary school in Nairobi, Kenya.

== History and operations ==
City High School was established in 1952 by the Sharma family, who had managed several high schools in the Ngara area.

On October 31, 1964, around 1000 boys at the school went on strike, objecting to the school facilities.

Ram Lal Sharma, who was the school's proprietor in the 1970s, was a follower of Hare Krishna. City High School was one of the last schools founded by him.

Lilian Mumias, wife of Nabongo (King) Peter Mumia II of the Wanga Kingdom, was among the school's teachers in the 1970s.

== Notable pupils ==
- Patrick Obara
- Thomas Odoyo, Kenyan cricketer
- Heronimo Sehmi, actor
- Professor George Wajackoyah

== See also ==
- Education in Kenya
- List of schools in Kenya
