= Kanana Muthomi =

Kenyan amateur golfer (born 2013)

Personal information
- Born: 2013 (age 12–13) Kenya
- Sporting nationality: Kenyan
- Residence: Nairobi, Kenya

Career
- Status: Amateur

Kanana Muthomi (born 2013) is a Kenyan amateur golfer. She has gained national attention in Kenya for her success in junior and open tournaments from a young age.

== Early life ==
Muthomi was introduced to golf at the age of two at the Windsor Golf Hotel & Country Club in Nairobi, where her father worked. She began formal training and competitive play by age six.

== Career ==
=== Amateur career ===
In 2023, Muthomi won her age category at the Junior Golf Foundation's Safaricom-sponsored event at Royal Nairobi Golf Club. Earlier that year, she was the top-performing female golfer at the Kabete Open, finishing third overall in the amateur category. Her ability to compete against professionals was demonstrated when she made the cut at the 2023 Safari Tour event at Vet Lab Sports Club. She continued her success into 2024 by winning the girls' 13-14 years title at a Junior Golf Foundation leg held at Vet Lab Sports Club.

== National representation ==
Muthomi was selected for the Kenyan national junior golf team in 2023 for training ahead of regional championships.

== Style of play and recognition ==
Muthomi has been featured in national and international media as "Kenya's golf prodigy." She has expressed aspirations to turn professional and represent Kenya internationally.
