= Spring Valley, Nairobi =

Residential suburb in Nairobi, Kenya

Spring Valley
- Location of Spring Valley in Kenya
- Coordinates: 1°14′45″S 36°46′52″E
- Country: Kenya
- County: Nairobi City
- Sub-county: Westlands

Area
  - Total: 1.1 sq mi (2.8 km^{2})

Population (2019)
  - Total: 6,804
  - Density: 6,300/sq mi (2,432/km^{2})
- Time zone: UTC+3

Spring Valley is a residential neighbourhood in the city of Nairobi. It is approximately 6 kilometres (3.7 mi) northwest of the central business district of Nairobi.

== Location ==
Spring Valley is located approximately 6 kilometres (3.7 mi) northwest of Nairobi's central business district. It borders the Barton and the Kyuna neighbourhoods.

== Overview ==
Spring Valley was zoned as a low-density neighbourhood, but over the years residential flats were allowed. Single family residential units are more common in Upper Spring Valley. It was an exclusive neighbourhood prior to the revision of zoning regulations that is inhabited by a high-income segment of Nairobi residents. It has slowly become more middle-class as the mushrooming of flats started. It has a mixture of modern, old and pre-modern architecture.

As per the 2019 census, Spring Valley had a population of 6,804, with a population density of 2,432/km^{2} in a land area of 2.8 km^{2}.
