= Hurlingham, Nairobi =

Neighbourhood in Nairobi, Kenya

Hurlingham
- Location of Hurlingham in Kenya
- Coordinates: 1°17′25″S 36°48′0″E
- Country: Kenya
- County: Nairobi City
- Sub-county: Westlands

Hurlingham is a commercial and residential neighbourhood in the city of Nairobi. It is approximately 2.5 kilometres (1.6 mi) west of the central business district.

== Location ==
Hurlingham Estate is located approximately 2.5 kilometres (1.6 mi) west of Nairobi's central business district in the Upper Hill neighbourhood. Hurlingham is straddled by mostly the Agwings Kodhek Road (formerly Hurlingham Road). It ends at the intersection between Agwings Kodhek Road and Cotton Avenue (Ring Road, Kilimani). Yaya Centre, an upscale shopping mall, is a major landmark of the neighbourhood. It borders Kilimani Estate to the west, to the and north and contains Caledonia Estate. Electorally, Hurlingham is placed under Dagoretti North Constituency, which is partially administratively placed within the larger sub-county of Westlands.

== Overview ==
Hurlingham Estate was named after a sport of polo was introduced in British East Africa at around 1907. Hurlingham was placed under the Upper Hill and was considered a whites-only residential area by the British colonialists in the mid 20th century. It was not until the 1960s when it was racially integrated. The neighbourhood has historically been primarily low-density residential, but gradually grew into a mixed-use neighbourhood since the early 1990s; both retail and offices and the launch of Yaya Centre shopping mall.

== Points of interest ==
1. Yaya Centre, in Hurlingham, is a shopping mall with over 100 retail shops.
2. Department of Defence Headquarters, along Valley Road.
