= Tim Wanyonyi =

Kenyan lawyer and politician

Honourable Timothy Wanyonyi Wetangula MP
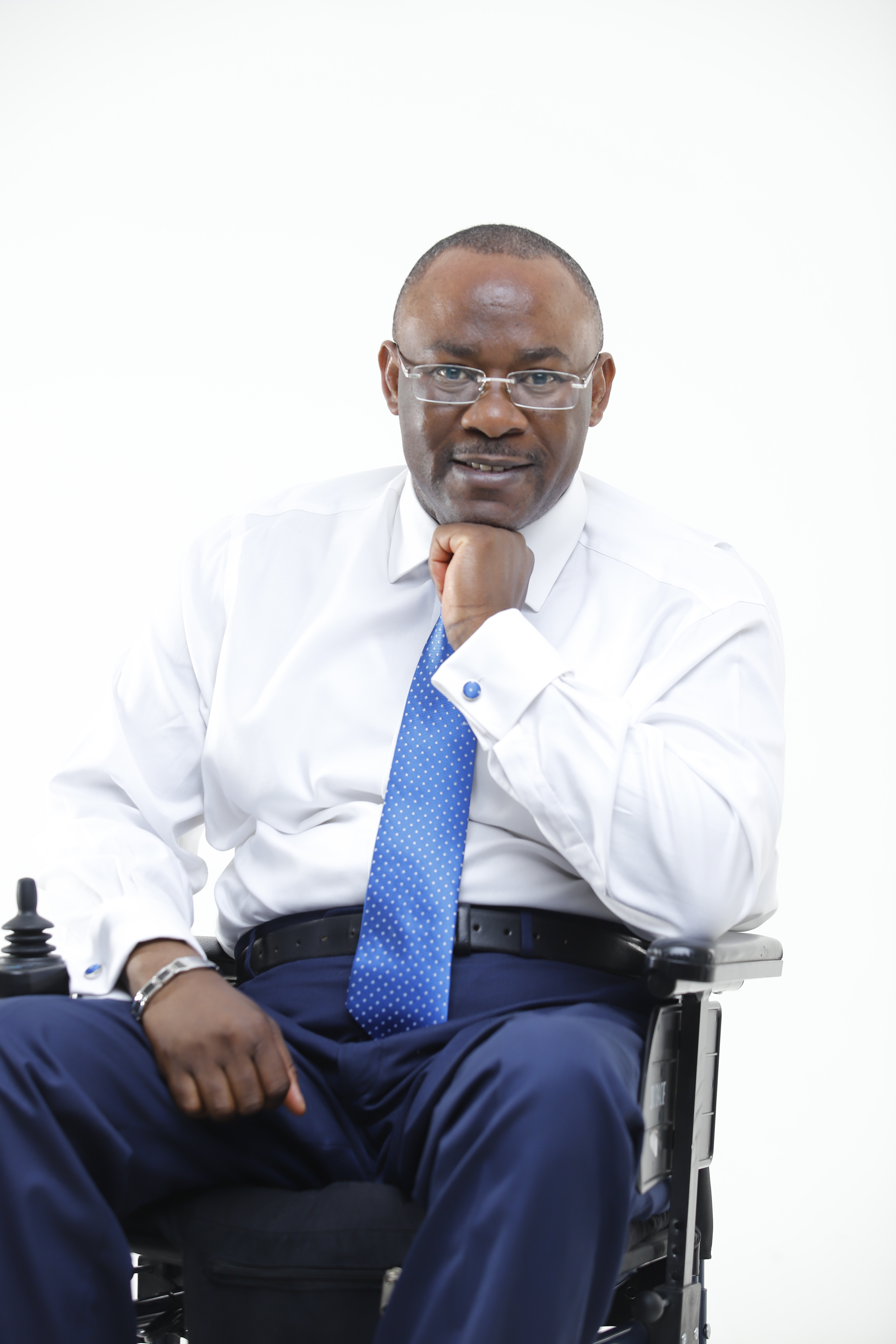

9th Member of the Kenyan Parliament for Westlands Constituency
- Incumbent
- Assumed office 28 March 2013
- Preceded by: Fred Gumo
- Constituency: Westlands Constituency

Personal details
- Born: Timothy Wanyonyi Wetangula; 1963 (age 62–63) Mukhweya, Nalondo, Bungoma County, Kenya
- Party: ODM; Azimio La Umoja
- Other political affiliations: NASA (before 2022)
- Spouse: Electina Naswa
- Relations: Moses Wetangula (brother)
- Children: 3
- Education: Punjab University; University of Delhi
- Occupation: Politician
- Profession: Lawyer
- Website: www.parliament.go.ke www.facebook.com/TimothyWanyonyiWetangula
- Nickname: Tim

Timothy Wanyonyi Wetangula is a Kenyan lawyer and politician serving as a member of parliament representing Westlands Constituency. He was first elected as a councillor for the defunct Nairobi City Council in 2007 election, before being elected Westlands MP during 2013 elections and defended his seat in the 2017 and 2022 general elections held on 8 August 2017 and 9 August 2022 respectively. He is a brother to Moses Wetangula, the Speaker of the National Assembly of Kenya and former senator for Bungoma County. He is a member of the Orange Democratic Movement.

Wetangula founded the Kenya Paraplegic Organisation. He is in the Azimio la Umoja coalition movement that lost in the 2022 general elections.

== Family and background ==
Wanyonyi, the seventh-born in his family, was brought up in Mukhweya village, Nalondo, Bungoma County. His father, Mzee Dominic Wetang'ula, is a retired teacher and a polygamist. They were brought up in abject poverty, a matter that forced Wanyonyi to repeat classes severally as he sacrificed for his other siblings to also achieve education.

His elder brother, Moses Wetang'ula, is the current speaker of the National Assembly of Kenya, and party leader of the Forum for the Restoration of Democracy – Kenya. His other siblings include the twins James Mukhwana Wetang'ula and Virginia Sikhoya Sifuma who are the eldest in the family and are both retired teachers; Mary Khayinja Ong'amo and Dorothy Namarome Watila(who are also twins); Scholastica Naswa Opemo, a retired civil servant residing in Kisumu; Fred Wekesa Wetang'ula and Charles Atkins Wetang'ula both Bungoma-based businessmen and step-brother to the Late Anthony Waswa Wetang'ula.

Timothy Wetangula is married to Electina Naswa and they are blessed with three children; a son Sylvanus and twin daughters Paulyne and Sophia.
