= Fred Gumo =

Kenyan politician

== Early life ==
Fredrick Fidelis Omulo Gumo (born 1945) is the first-born son to the famous businessman Pius Gumo and Martina Gumo. He belongs to the Abanyala people, a sub-tribe of the Abaluhya tribe of the western Kenya. Gumo has largely kept a low profile since retiring from active politics in 2013 after 38 years. He is remembered for his ‘Kaa Ngumu’ rallying call.

== Education ==
He studied diploma in Mechanical Engineering at the Kenya Polytechnic and went on to study a higher diploma in the same field at Metropolitan college in London.

== Political career ==
He currently belongs to the ODM and represented the Westlands Constituency in the National Assembly of Kenya from 1994 to 2013. He also served as the member of parliament for Kitale East Constituency following his election in 1979 and went on to serve between 1979 and 1984, his star continued rising after he was re-elected in the 1983 snap election on a KANU party. However, in 1984 Gumo's election was invalidated due to ballot box stuffing. Masinde Muliro won the resulting by-election against a Kalenjin candidate, Hon Joseph Yego in an election marred by widespread election rigging and malpractises.

He would be elected again into parliament in a by-election following the death of Hon Amin Walji, the then MP for Westlands Constituency. In 2013, he retired from active politics and was replaced by Hon Timothy Wanyonyi Wetangula as the representative of the Westlands Constituency.

The veteran politician was also elected mayor of Kitale Municipal Council and chairman of Nairobi City Commission between 1989 and 1992, and he is remembered for facilitating the great migration of communities from Western Province to the Nairobi City when he headed the then City Council of Nairobi.

He also served as the Assistant Minister for Tourism and Wildlife between 2003 and 2007. In 2008, he was appointed Minister for Regional Development Authorities from 2008. In 2012, he was appointed to take over the ministerial duties at the Ministry of Local Government in an acting capacity. The office had fallen vacant after the then deputy Prime Minister Musalia Mudavadi resigned in order to focus his energy on his presidential bid.

In 2013, the veteran politician announced he was quitting active politics. He said he would not be going for any political positions in the coming elections as he wanted to spend time with his family and travel the world. He then added that he would support Raila Odinga's presidential bid. “I have decided to retire from politics peacefully. I know if I decided to run for any seat I can easily win. I am now 66 years old and I think I have done enough. I also need my own time so that I can travel around the world and my country and enjoy myself,” he said at the time.

== Controversies ==
=== Child upkeep case ===
In 2013, The Standard reported that the former legislator was embroiled in a paternity suit after a woman sued him for maintenance of her six-months old baby. The woman was seeking Ksh150,000 maintenance while Gumo said he had offered her Ksh10,000 and secured her a job in Kisumu. He requested a DNA test, which both of them agreed to. He said the woman just wanted to enrich herself through him as she had three other children whose father's must be paying maintenance.

=== Gumo Had Moi’s Car Stolen In 2008 ===
In 2012, the then Local Government Minister was found in possession of a Range Rover belonging to former President Daniel arap Moi that had been stolen in 2008. The top of the range vehicle had been taken to CMC Industrial Area workshop for repairs when it went missing under mysterious circumstances.

In his defense, Mr Gumo claimed he had bought the vehicle from a Mombasa-based businessman and had made attempts to return it to the seller but he failed to pay him back forcing him to repossess the car.

“I traded in my vehicle with a Mombasa businessman to get this car. However, I rarely use it because I never received all the documents,” said Mr Gumo. The vehicle was impounded when it was taken to CMC for servicing as it matched the car that had gone missing four years earlier. The car bore registration number KBQ 455S but the records in the computers showed that it was received for service yesterday as KBJ 124D. “CMC is announcing that it has impounded a motor vehicle whose details are believed to closely match those of a car that was believed to have gone missing in its workshop in 2008,” said CMC CEO Mr Lay.

== Family and personal life ==
He is married to Mary Gumo and Emma Gumo to whom he has 10 children. Among his well known children are Michael Magero Gumo and Pius Omulo Gumo, they have been trying to fit into their fathers shoes the former having vied for the Westlands Constituency seat in Nairobi County on an ODM, while the latter vied for the Endebess Constituency seat in Trans Nzoia County as an independent candidate during the 2022 general election.

National Assembly (Kenya)
Preceded by Amin Walji	Member of Parliament for Westlands; Bye election 1994–2013	Succeeded by Timothy Wanyonyi Wetangula
