= Margaret Kobia =

Kenyan civil servant

Cabinet Secretary for the Public Service, Youth and Gender Affairs
- In office 26 January 2018 – 27 October 2022
- President: Uhuru Kenyatta
- Preceded by: Sicily Kariuki
- Succeeded by: Aisha Katana Juma

Personal details
- Born: Meru County, Kenya
- Children: 3
- Education: University of Nairobi (Bachelor of Education); Kenyatta University (Master of Education); University of Illinois at Urbana–Champaign (Doctor of Philosophy)

Margaret Kanyiri Kobia (née Rukaria) is a Kenyan civil servant who was nominated by President Uhuru Kenyatta as Cabinet Secretary for the Public Service, Youth, and Gender Affairs, on 26 January 2018. Prior to her current position, she served as the chairperson of the Kenya Public Service Commission from December 2012 until January 2018.

== Background and education ==
Kobia was born in Meru County. Her mother was a farmer and housewife and her father was a police officer. She is the first-born in a family of seven siblings, five sisters, and two brothers. Kobia attended Mariinya-A-Ruibi Primary School. She then studied at Alliance Girls High School, which she joined in 1972, for both her O-Level and A-Level education, graduating in 1977.

In 1979, she was admitted to the University of Nairobi, graduating with a Bachelor of Education (BEd) degree. In 1990, she was admitted to Kenyatta University, where she obtained a Master of Education (MEd) degree, specializing in teacher education, in 1991. Later, in 2003, she graduated with a Doctor of Philosophy (PhD) degree, in Human Resource Education and Entrepreneurship, from the University of Illinois at Urbana–Champaign, where she studied on scholarship.

== Career ==
Right after her first degree, Kobia started teaching at Ngara Girls' High School in 1981. After six years at Ngara, she joined the Kenya National Examinations Council (KNEC) as a research officer and test developer.

In 1992, Kobia was appointed Senior Lecturer in Education at Kenya Science Teachers’ College. Then in 1996, she moved to Kenyatta University as the Acting Deputy Registrar and the Director of the Students’ Welfare Services Board. In 2002, she was appointed Assistant Commission Secretary at the then Commission for Higher Education, now the Commission for University Education. She then returned to teaching, at Strathmore University, as a senior lecturer in management, Entrepreneurship and Research Methodology.

In 2005, Kobia was appointed the director, Kenya Institute of Administration (KIA), now the Kenya School of Government, serving in that capacity until 2012, when she was appointed the chairperson of the Kenya Public Service Commission, the first Kenyan woman to serve in that position.

== Family ==
Kobia is a married mother of three children, one son and two daughters.

== Other considerations ==
Kobia has received a number of awards, including the "Order of Grand Warrior" (OGW), the Order of "Chief of Burning Spear" (CBS), Elder of Golden Heart (EGH) and the "Commonwealth Gordon Draper Award". She was elected as the Vice President and board member of the Commonwealth Association of Public Administration and Management (CAPAM), in October 2014. She was awarded the 2019 distinguished Alumni Award by the College of Education, University of Illinois. She is the Chancellor, St Paul's University, Kenya since 2018. She is a fellow at the Kenya Institute of Management and at the Institute of Certified Public Secretaries of Kenya.

== See also ==
- Amina Mohamed
- Raychelle Omamo
- Judy Wakhungu
