= Yaya Centre =

Shopping centre in Nairobi

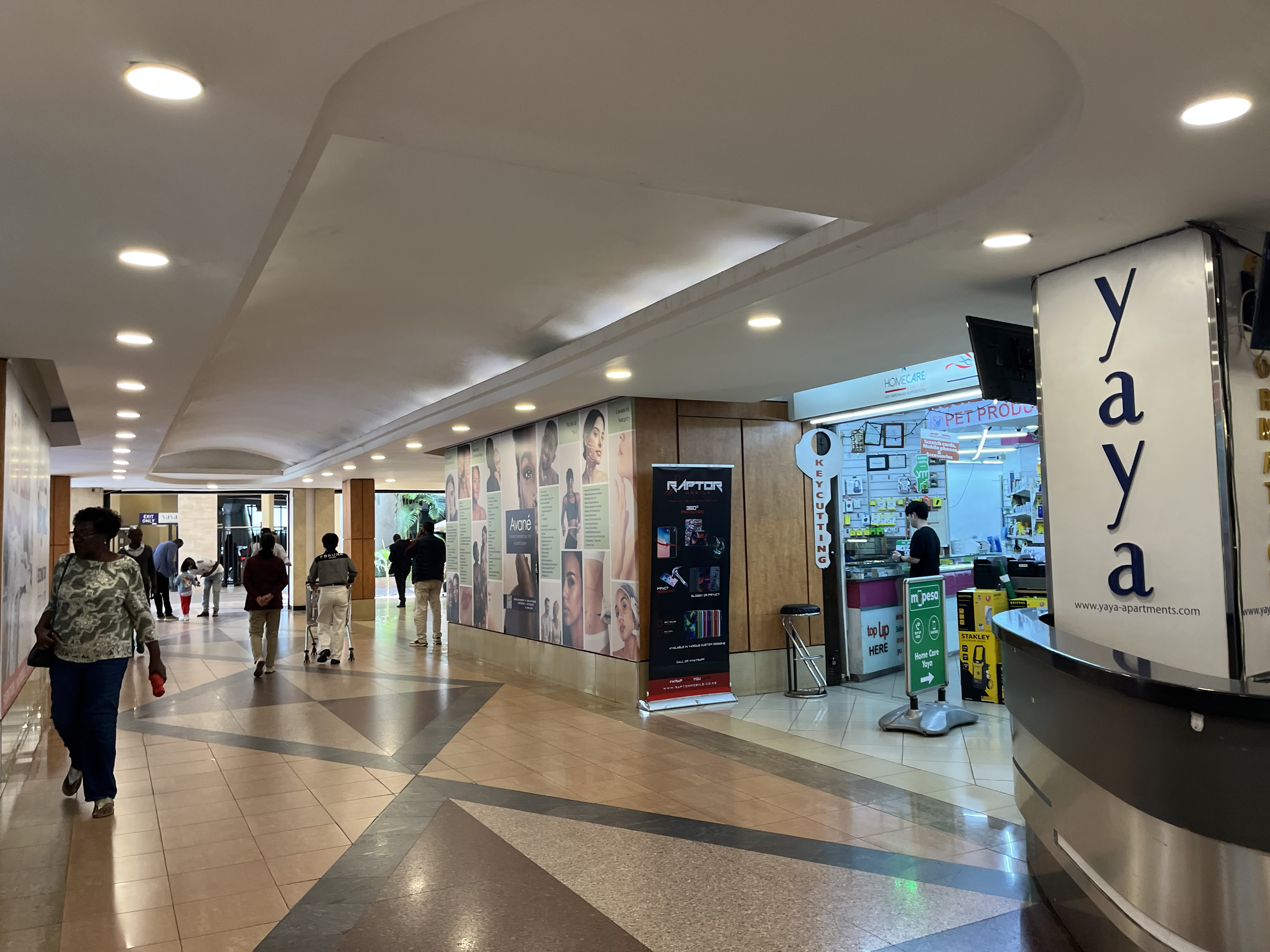
- Location: Hurlingham, Nairobi, Kenya
- Coordinates: 1°17′33″S 36°47′15″E
- Opened: 1992; 34 years ago
- Owner: Biwott family (former); Kantaria family (current)
- Website: www.yaya-centre.com

Yaya is a shopping centre located in Hurlingham in Nairobi, Kenya. The establishment had been an asset for the Nicholas Biwott business empire until 2023 when it was announced that the Kantaria family had acquired it at undisclosed amount.

== Overview ==
The mall is located approximately 3.4 kilometres (2 mi) from Nairobi's city centre, along Argwings Kodhek Road in Hurlingham in Upper Hill. It was opened to the public in 1992, making it one of the first malls in Kenya. The mall is part of a mixed-use establishment that also provides housing in the Yaya Towers; in which the west wing tower as remained incomplete due to a suspected dispute with the contractor. Yaya Centre provides an array of services from a retail supermarket chain; fast food restaurants; fashion and accessories shops; electronics and technology shops; banking and services; a movie theatre; outdoor recreation centre.

The shopping complex has for years been associated with the late former cabinet minister Nicholas Biwott's business empire since. In July 2023, saw a consortium of investors, notably Kantaria family, acquire the shopping centre together with Yaya Towers and Hotel for an undisclosed amount. The private transaction had reportedly been executed in 2020.
