= Kenton College =

Kenton College Preparatory School

Location
- Kileleshwa, Nairobi; Kenya; 1.2793943575617°S 36.788601673456°E

Information
- Motto: Viribus Synceri Viri Sinceritate (By the strength of sincerity, by the sincerity of men)
- Founders: Finlay Cramb, William Jesse
- Head teacher: Sally Weston
- Gender: Coeducational
- Age: 3 to 13
- Website: kentonschoolnairobi.com

Kenton College Preparatory School is a co-educational, independent preparatory day school located in the Kileleshwa neighborhood of Nairobi, Kenya. It caters to pupils aged 6 to 13 (Years 1 to 8) and follows the National Curriculum for England.

It is one of the oldest international preparatory schools in East Africa, having been founded in what was then the Kenya Colony in 1924.

== History ==
=== Foundation and early years (1924–1934) ===
Kenton College was established in January 1924 as an all-boys boarding school by Finlay Cramb, who served as the school's first headmaster, and William Jesse.

The school was originally situated on Kijabe Hill overlooking Mount Longonot and Lake Naivasha, on the premises of a former infirmary for European settlers.

Due to the isolation of the Kijabe location, the founders secured a 35-acre plot in Kileleshwa, 5 kilometers from the Nairobi city center. Construction began in 1934, and the school officially relocated to its current site in January 1935.

=== Second World War and mid-20th century ===
At the onset of World War II, the British military requisitioned the Kileleshwa campus for use as a military headquarters and later as a hospital. During this time, the school temporarily relocated to the Westwood Park Hotel in Ngong. Following the end of the war, Kenton College returned to its Kileleshwa location.

Rev. Cyril Birks took over as headmaster in 1947, leading the school until 1966. Under his successor, Rev. Roy Stagg (1966–1980), the school began admitting day pupils for the first time.

=== Modern era ===
In 1980, the school transitioned into an educational trust. Further major administrative changes occurred under headmaster Henry Searle, who introduced girls to the school in 1992, making Kenton College fully co-educational. Boarding was eventually phased out, converting the school into an all-day institution.

== Campus and facilities ==
The school is situated on a 35-acre campus on Gichugu Road in Kileleshwa, Nairobi. Its facilities include:

- Science laboratories and ICT suites
- The Roger Owles Hall (a multi-purpose assembly and performing arts hall)
- An open-air swimming pool
- Sports fields for rugby, cricket, football, hockey, and rounders
- Tennis and netball courts

== Management and governance ==
Kenton College is run as a not-for-profit institution by a trust, the Kenton College Trust, which is managed by a board of governors consisting of parents of current and former students.

The Board of Governors appoints the school's headteacher.

== Academics and curriculum ==
Kenton College follows the National Curriculum of England adapted for an international context. Pupils in Year 8 take the Common Entrance (CE) examinations administered by the Independent Schools Examinations Board (ISEB).

Graduates typically transition to private international secondary schools. in Kenya, as well as schools in the United Arab Emirates, United Kingdom and South Africa.

== Affiliations ==
Kenton College is a member of:

- The Independent Association of Prep Schools (IAPS)
- The Kenya Association of Independent Schools (KAIS)
