= Ngara Girls' High School =

Boarding school in Kenya

Ngara Girls' High School is a girls' secondary boarding school in Nairobi, Kenya.

== History and operations ==
It opened in January 1957 as a mixed-sex secondary school for Indian-Kenyan students. It served Nairobi neighbourhoods of Ngara and Parklands.

In 1962, male students were transferred out, making the school girls' only; boys who previously attended the school began attending Highway Secondary School in South B, Nairobi.

The school opened to students of all races after 1964, when racial segregation in schooling ended.

In 2004, the school's boarding facilities opened. The funding came from a 1996 Community Development Trust Fund (CDTF) grant.

== Notable staff ==
- Margaret Kobia

== See also ==
- Education in Kenya
- List of boarding schools
- List of schools in Kenya
- Women in Kenya
