= Mountain View, Nairobi =

Neighbourhood in Nairobi, Kenya

Mountain View
- Location of Mountain View in Kenya
- Coordinates: 1°16′9″S 36°44′20″E
- Country: Kenya
- County: Nairobi City
- Sub-county: Westlands

Area
  - Total: 0.81 sq mi (2.1 km^{2})

Population (2019)
  - Total: 22,294
  - Density: 27,850/sq mi (10,752/km^{2})
- Time zone: UTC+3

Mountain View is a neighbourhood in the city of Nairobi. It is approximately 9 kilometres (5.6 mi) west of the central business district of Nairobi.

== Overview ==
Mountain View is located south of Waiyaki Way, 9 kilometres (5.6 mi) west of the Nairobi central business district, and borders the low-income neighbourhood of Kangemi. It is a middle-income to lower middle-income neighbourhood significantly characterised by single-family homes with a gated community.

Mountain View, an electoral ward, borrows its name from the estate. It covers the Gichagi and Mountain View sub-locations of Nairobi.

As per the 2019 census, Mountain View had a population of 22,294, with a population density of 10,752/km^{2} in a land area of 2.1 km^{2}.
