= Amin Walji =

Amin Walji was Kenyan Asian politician who was elected as the (KANU) representative for the Westlands Constituency in the Kenyan general election, 1992, the first multi-party elections since independence in 1963.

The Westlands Constituency was a marginal seat, and Walji challenged the incumbent Njoroge Mungai for the KANU by nomination. There were claims that Mungai had won the first ballots, but concern over irregularities in the nomination process led to the nomination process being carried out three times, with a third candidate dropping out complaining that non-resident voters were being imported to rig the nominations.

He died in 1996.

National Assembly (Kenya)
Preceded by Njoroge Mungai	Member of Parliament for Westlands; 1992–1994 (died in office)	Succeeded by Fred Gumo
