= Muthangari =

Neighbourhood in Nairobi, Kenya

- Location of Muthangari in Kenya
- Coordinates: 1°15′46″S 36°47′1″E
- Country: Kenya
- County: Nairobi City
- Sub-county: Westlands

Area
  - Total: 1.5 sq mi (3.9 km^{2})

Population (2019)
  - Total: 10,297
  - Density: 6,920/sq mi (2,672/km^{2})
- Time zone: UTC+3

Muthangari is a neighbourhood in the city of Nairobi. It is approximately 4.4 kilometres (2.7 mi) northwest of the central business district of Nairobi.

== Location ==
Muthangari is located approximately 4.4 kilometres (2.7 mi) northwest of Nairobi's central business district. It is straddled by the Waiyaki Way to the south.

== Overview ==
Muthangari was zoned as a low-density neighbourhood, but over the years, residential flats as well as commercial buildings were allowed. It was an exclusive neighbourhood prior to the revision of zoning regulations that was inhabited by high-income segment of Nairobi residents. It has slowly become more middle-class as the mushrooming of flats started. Muthangari and Kileleshwa together form the Kileleshwa county assembly ward of Nairobi City County

As per the 2019 census, the suburb has a population of 10,297, with a population density of 2,672 per square kilometres in a land area of 3.9 km^{2}.

== Points of interest ==
1. St. Mary's School, Nairobi, a private Roman Catholic primary and secondary day school for boys, located off James Gichuru Road in Muthangari.
2. ABC place, a shopping mall along Waiyaki Way in Muthangari.
