= Spring Valley =

Spring Valley may refer to:

== Places ==
=== Canada ===
- Spring Valley, Ontario
- Spring Valley, Prince Edward Island
- Spring Valley, Saskatchewan

=== Kenya ===
- Spring Valley, Nairobi

=== United States ===
- Spring Valley, Arizona
- Spring Valley, San Diego County, California
- Spring Valley, Lake County, California
- Valley Springs, California, formerly Spring Valley
- Spring Valley, Illinois
- Spring Valley, Kentucky
- Spring Valley, Minnesota
- Spring Valley, Nevada, in Clark County
- Spring Valley (White Pine County, Nevada), a valley in northeastern Nevada
  - Spring Valley Wind Farm, built in the valley in 2012
- Spring Valley, New Jersey
- Spring Valley, New York
- Spring Valley, Ohio
- Spring Valley (Oregon)
- Spring Valley Historic District, Pennsylvania
- Spring Valley Rural Historic District, Virginia
- Spring Valley, Manitowoc County, Wisconsin, an unincorporated community
- Spring Valley, Wisconsin, a village in Pierce and St. Croix counties
- Spring Valley (town), Wisconsin, in Rock County
- Spring Valley Village, Texas
- Spring Valley (Washington, D.C.)

== Other ==
- Spring Valley (Yoplait)
- Spring Valley High School (South Carolina)
