= Samuel Kivuitu =

Kenyan bureaucrat

Samuel Kivuitu (1939 – 25 February 2013) was head of the now defunct Electoral Commission of Kenya. He was reappointed to his post by the Kenyan President Mwai Kibaki ahead of the 2007 general election, having already been in charge during Kenya's general elections in 1997, 2002 as well as a constitutional referendum in 2005.

== Death ==
He died on 25 February 2013 at the MP Shah hospital after suffering from throat cancer for years.
