= Kabete =

Human settlement in Kenya

Coordinates: 1°16′S 36°43′E

Kabete is the ancestral name of the present Kiambu county. Today, it is a neighbourhood that located along the border of Nairobi and Kiambu counties. It is located less than 15 km (9.3 mi) outside of the capital city of Nairobi. According to the 2009 census, the Kabete area has a population of 140,427. As part of the Nairobi Highlands area, the region's environment remains unpolluted.

Anthropologist Louis Leakey was born in Kabete. His nickname was Giteru and hence the reference Kabete gwa Giteru (Meaning Kabete, Giteru's place). The Mary Leakey High School, founded in the Lower Kabete area remains as part of his family's legacy.

Kabete town also has the Kabete National Polytechnic, that offers tertiary education.
