= Highway Secondary School =

- Form IV block at Highway Secondary School

Location
- Coordinates: 1°19′03″S 36°50′13″E

Information
- Motto: With Pride and Dignity, Endeavour to Excel
- Established: 19 February 1962
- Gender: Boys
- Houses: 4
- Colour: Ultramarine
- Website: www.highwaysecondary.sc.ke

The Highway Secondary is a public boys' boarding school located in Nairobi's South B suburb, Kenya. The school is named for the Mombasa Highway that runs along the school's southern perimeter. The school is classified as an Extra County school.

== History ==
The school was created as an Asian school for O-level boys and co-ed A-level (girls and boys) on 19 February 1962. This was concurrent with the conversion of Ngara Girls' High School a boy's and girls school into an all-girls school. The headmaster along with all the male teaching staff and the boys were moved to the site of the present school location.

The school was officially inaugurated by Hon. Lawrence G. Sagini, Minister of Education. In 1963 the school enrolled its first four black students. The school is currently headed by Principal P.Irungu Nduati and deputy principal Mrs Mwaura .In 2022 after winning the East Africa school soccer games, the school qualified for the International School Football games that will be held in Morocco. This being the first time Kenya in being represented in the world games.

== Headmasters ==
- Mr. M.A. Turnidge (1962)
- Mr. J.C. Clement (1962–1963)
- Mr. J. Farnell (1963–1964)
- Mr. M.A. Quarishy (1965–1966)
- Mr. A.S. Maina (1969–1973)
- Mr. C.B. Maina (June 1973 – December 1973)
- Mr. N.W.A. Mwangi (January 1974 – January 1980)
- Mr. G.M. Okwiya (February 1980 – January 1982)
- Mr. S.K. Kibe (February 1982 – December 1996)
- Mr. H.W. Njeru (January 1997 – December 1998)
- Mrs. A. Kasibwa (January 1999 – April 2001)
- Mr. D. Karaba (May 2001 – October 2002)
- Mr. J.K. Mbogori (October 2002 to– January 2010)
- Mr. P. Maritim (January 2010 – December 2019)
- Mr.P.Irungu Nduati (January 2020-

== Chairmen of Board of Governors ==
- Dr. Hassanaly Rattansi (1964–1978)
- Mr. D.M. Mutiso (1978–1996)
- Mr. L.M. Ombete( 1997–1999)
- Mr. P. Thige (2000 – July 2006)
- Dr. Vijoo Rattansi, OGW (July 2006 – )

== Notable alumni ==
- Naushad N. Merali - founder of Sameer Group
- Clemo Kenyan Music producer and co-founder of Calif records
- Dr. Nicholas Muraguri Director of Medical Services. 2013 to date
- Harold Wafula Systems Auditor-City Hall. 2010 to 2015 | Trustee-Systems Audit Office. 2015 to 2024 | Chief Finance Officer-City Hall(Nairobi Sub County).2024 to date
- [Joash Omoke, Internet Specialist]
- Joel Chacha General Manager and Chief Strategist at Tell-Em Public Relations (2017 to date), Corporate Member Representative / Board Member - Marketing Society of Kenya (MSK), Chairman Marketing and Gala Committee, Judge at MSK, Chairman of the Media Relations Expert Panel at the Public Relations Society of Kenya (PRSK), Director Visions International Academy and College (2008 to date)
- Nick Ndeda Former Radio host kiss 100 Kenya and Homeboyz Radio( urban sound of Nairobi.
