= Kitisuru Ward =

Kitisuru Ward is a ward in Westlands Constituency, Nairobi County, Kenya. It comprises Kitisuru, Loresho and Kyuna. It has a population of around 31.302 people and covers 21.3 km^{2}, yielding a population density of 1,465 people per km^{2}.

Alvin Alando Palapala of the Orange Democratic Movement represents the ward on the Nairobi City County Assembly.
