= Ramlal Sharma =

Indian teacher and economist

Ram Lal Sharma (1941–2012) was an Indian teacher and economist.

== Biography ==
Sharma was born in Baytoo, a small village in Barmer district of Rajasthan, India in 1941. His father was a poor farmer. When he was a student at high school, he began to work part-time to support his parents. Despite several hardships, he had a strong desire to gain higher education and graduated in Economics from Jai Narain Vyas University, Jodhpur. He was later appointed as a faculty member in the same university. In 1969, under the Fulbright Program, he went to study at the University of Arizona, United States.

During his career as a university teacher, he taught at several institutions in India and abroad which included Birla Institute of Technology and Science, Pilani, University of Nairobi, Kenya, and Indian Institute of Management Ahmedabad.

Throughout his career, he worked on many research projects in economics. In 2000, he began to teach on a part-time basis at the newly established Aravali Institute of Management at Jodhpur. He was proud and delighted to learn that the quality of higher education had started to improve in Rajasthan and the private sector was also making its own contribution. He was then appointed at another newly established National Law University, Jodhpur. Later, he was granted emeritus professorship from University Grants Commission and worked on a project named Money Cycle in India.

Apart from teaching, Sharma also took an active part in reforming society. He voiced strong concerns against the widely popular culture of "feasts on death" (locally known as Mrityu Bhoj). Despite being born in a Brahmin family, he was against the caste system in India, which divides society into upper and lower castes. He was often sad that in his lifetime he couldn't see the elimination of the caste system from society.

Sharma fell ill in 1996 and was given a life expectancy of a few weeks, however he recovered and continued to work.

In January 2010, he was appointed as a faculty member at Indian Institute of Technology, Jodhpur, but soon developed severe pneumonia. He was put on ventilator support and his life expectancy was predicted to be a few days. He recovered, but unfortunately his heart became weak and he developed severe heart failure. While homebound from illness, he continued to teach students.

On 20 October 2012, Sharma died sitting next to his wife at home. His family members have taken initiative to start Professor Ram Lal Sharma education trust to help improve level of education in Western Rajasthan.
