= Butere Girls High School =

- Kenya

Information
- Gender: Girls
- Website: https://www.buteregirlshighschool.sc.ke/

Butere Girls High School is a girls only public boarding secondary school in Butere, Kenya.

== History ==
Butere Girls High School grew out of a primary school founded by the Irish missionary Jane Elizabeth Chadwick, who arrived in Butere in 1916 and taught there until 1925, when she returned to Ireland. Some of Chadwick's manuscript memories of her early students have been anthologized. The school became a full day school in 1931 and then a boarding school in 1937. The future archbishop Festo Olang' taught at Butere in the early 1940s.

In 1957 it became a secondary school. At that time the school was regarded as a leading Protestant girls' high school, ranked second in Kenya after Alliance Girls High School. In 1970 it admitted its first A level class. After facing infrastructure, management and discipline problems in the 1980s its academic performance deteriorated. However, its performance recovered and in 2012 the school was promoted to national school category.

In 2013 the school presented a controversial play, Shackles of Doom, by the playwright and future senator Cleophas Malala. The play, which addressed the issues of ethnicity, tribalism and inequality in Kenya, was banned by the Ministry of Education, though the ban was later lifted by the High Court. In 2018 the school's performance of another play by Mabala, It is Well, earned them first place at Western Region Drama Festival.

In 2016 the principal, Dorah Okalo, was removed from office after pressure from the Bishop of Butere.

In February 2019 a Form Three student committed suicide at the school.

== Notable alumni ==
- Joyce Aluoch, lawyer.
- Amina Mohamed, politician.
- Grace Ogot, writer and politician.
- Janet Okello, rugby player.
- Norah Olembo (1941-2021), biochemist and biotechnology policy advocate
- Doreen Othero, public health expert, academic, regional research and policy development expert and diplomat for the East African Community.
- Effie Owuor, judge.
- Rachel Ruto, second and later first lady of Kenya.
