= Elizabeth Chadwick (missionary) =

Irish missionary and educator in Uganda and Kenya

(Jane) Elizabeth Chadwick, also known as Lisette Chadwick (1869–1940) was an Irish missionary and educator in Uganda and Kenya.

== Life ==
Elizabeth Chadwick was the daughter of George Chadwick, a Church of Ireland clergyman who later became Bishop of Derry and Raphoe.

Chadwick became a Church Missionary Society missionary, travelling overland with other women missionaries in 1895 from Table Bay, South Africa to Kibwezi, Uganda. As a missionary stationed in Namirembe, Chadwick established the first girls' school in Uganda. From 1916 to 1925 she was a missionary in Butere, Kenya, where she established Butere Girls High School. Some of Chadwick's manuscript memories of her early students have been anthologized.

Her papers are held by the University of Birmingham.
