= Kitisuru =

Residential neighbourhood in Nairobi, Kenya

- Location in Kenya
- Coordinates: 01°12′24″S 36°46′08″E
- Country: Kenya
- County: Nairobi City
- Sub-county: Westlands
- Elevation: 5,600 ft (1,700 m)

Kitisuru is a residential suburb of Nairobi. The name Kitisuru comes from a nearby river "Gĩtathuru" which was borrowed from the original inhabitants of the area who were mainly of the Kikuyu ethnic group. Kitisuru forms part of Kitisuru Ward, an electoral division within Nairobi City County.

== Location ==
Kitisuru is located approximately 9.5 kilometres (5.9 mi), by road, northwest of the central business district of Nairobi. The coordinates of Kitisuru are:01 12 24S, 36 46 08E (Latitude:-1.2400; Longitude:36.7688).

== Overview ==
Kitisuru is an affluent residential suburb of Nairobi. There are several residential neighbourhoods with schools and places of worship. These include New Kitisuru, which borders Mwimuto in Kiambu County.

== Schools ==
Educational institutions located in this area include the International School of Kenya (which caters mostly to US Embassy staff) and the School of the Nations (Kenya), a Christian-based international school established by South Korean missionaries.

== Population ==
The exact population of Kitisuru is not publicly known as of November 2010. Loresho, Kyuna and Lower Kabete Sub–locations form part of the greater Kitisuru Ward. Some roads that pass via Kitisuru area include Lower Kabete Road, Getathuru Road, Kitisuru Road, Kirawa Road, Ngecha Road and part of Peponi Road.

== See also ==
- Parklands, Nairobi
- Westlands
- Upper Hill, Nairobi
- Nairobi
