= Lower Kabete =

Lower Kabete Kabete Lower
- Nickname: Kabeii
- Location in Kenya
- Coordinates: 01°12′24″S 36°46′08″E
- Country: Kenya
- County: Kiambu/Nairobi Border Area
- Elevation: 5,600 ft (1,700 m)

Lower Kabete is the name given to a region straddling Kiambu County and Nairobi County, Kenya. It falls between Wangige Area and Kitisuru Estate.

== Location of Lower Kabete ==
Lower Kabete is roughly 12 Kilometers from Nairobi CBD. The larger part of the Kabete area is, however, in Kiambu County with the border commencing at Rhythms College near the present-day Kabete Shopping Center some 5 Kilometers from the Wangige Market.

A small portion of Lower Kabete is in Westlands constituency of Nairobi County which is headed by Tim Wanyonyi as MP (2013–2022). Nairobi County's Lower Kabete Dispensary is found here alongside Lower Kabete Primary School and Farasi Lane Primary School.

The larger portion of this region lies squarely within the Kabete Constituency headed by James Githua Wamacukuru (2017-2022).

== Local Administration ==
The Lower Kabete Shopping Center is governed by the Kiambu County Government. However, a small portion to the South belongs to the Lower Kabete Sublocation in Nairobi County, its sub-chief's office is at the Kabete Approved Juvenile School.

== Ethnicities ==
Majority of individuals in Lower Kabete belong to the Kikuyu tribe. The remaining population is a mixture of people from other significantly populous Kenyan tribes, as well as individuals of Caucasian and Asian origins.

== Religions ==
Most individuals in Lower Kabete area practice Christianity and there are several churches of various denominations within this area. One of the oldest churches in Lower Kabete are and within central province is the Anglican Church Lower Kabete Diocese.

There are several evangelical churches spread out within this area too. Adjacent to Gacio Shopping Centre is a mosque serving a minority Muslim individuals. The nearest Hindu temple is approximately 8 kilometres away in Spring Valley estate.

== Lower Kabete Real Estate ==
Lower Kabete has several housing developments including Highgrove Village a premium luxury housing estate and Kabete Palms.
