= Kianyaga High School =

Secondary school in Kenya

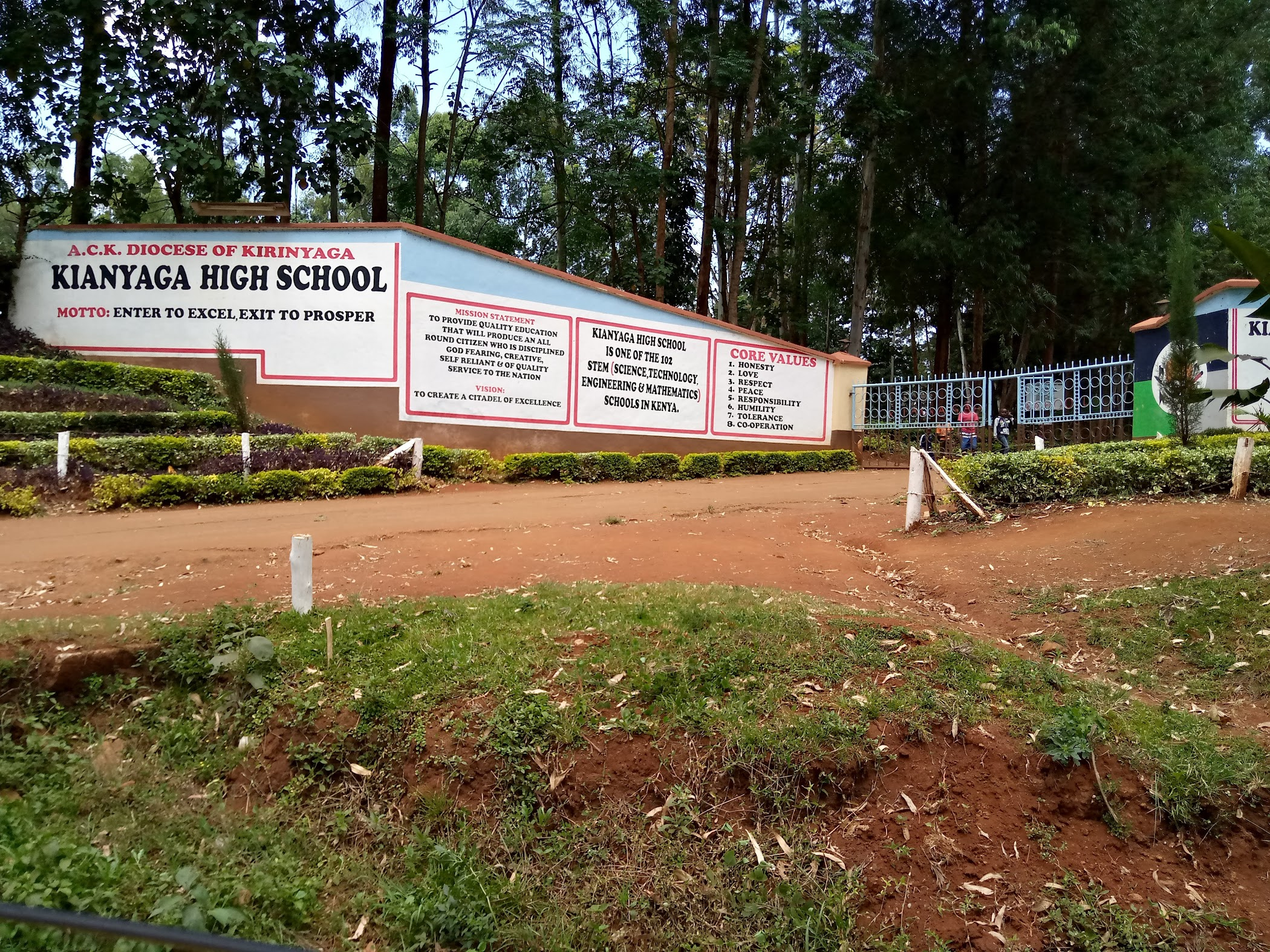
- Kianyaga High School gate

Location
- Near Kianyaga Town; Central region of Kenya; Kirinyaga County

Information
- School type: Public National Boys High school
- Motto: "Enter to excel, exit to prosper"
- Established: 1960s
- Principal: J.M. Mbothu
- Staff: 100+
- National ranking: Top 100

Kianyaga High School is a National boys secondary school located in Raimu sub-location, Baragwi, Gichugu Constituency, Kirinyaga County, in the central region of Kenya. It was established in the 1960s through the efforts of local elders. Despite initial skepticism from some community members, these determined elders persisted in their fundraising efforts to build the first high school in the area to provide quality secondary education to boys in Kirinyaga County and beyond. In its early years, the school earned the nickname "Kalahari" after the southern African desert, due to the harsh living conditions students endured. The school operates under the Kenyan Ministry of Education and is registered with the Kenya National Examinations Council (KNEC) under the code 9222201.

== Overview ==
Kianyaga High School is situated near Kianyaga Town, along the Kutus-Kianyaga Road, approximately 20 kilometers from Kerugoya, the county headquarters of Kirinyaga.

The school is led by Principal J.M.Mbothu, who manages its operations and academic programs. With a teaching staff of approximately 107+ teachers, the school has between 1,200 and 1,760 students.

As an Outstanding National school, Kianyaga High School is equipped with cutting edge facilities, including boarding dormitories, science laboratories, a library, and sports fields.

== Academics ==
The National school adheres to the Kenyan secondary education curriculum, preparing students for the Kenya Certificate of Secondary Education (KCSE) examinations.

In 2019, Kianyaga High School achieved a mean score of 7.7 (B−) in the national examinations, placing it among the top 100 schools in Kenya. In the 2020 KCSE examinations, the school recorded a mean score of 7.704 (B−), with 210 out of 284 candidates (73.94%) scoring C+ or above, the minimum grade for university entry. The results included 9 A− grades, 40 B+ grades, and 49 B grades.

The Kianyaga High School Grading System is considered the toughest one in the Kenya 8-4-4 syllabus. Kianyaga High School gate

| location                = Near Kianyaga Town
| region                  = Central region of Kenya
| county                  = Kirinyaga County
| schooltype              = Public National Boys High school
| principal               = J.M. Mbothu
| staff                   = 100+
| national_ranking        = Top 100
| motto                   = "Enter to excel, exit to prosper"

}}

== Admission ==
Admission to Kianyaga High School is overseen by the Kenyan Ministry of Education. As a public National boys’ school, it admits students competitively based on their performance in the Kenya Certificate of Primary Education (KCPE) examinations.
