= Kilimani =

Suburb in Nairobi, Kenya

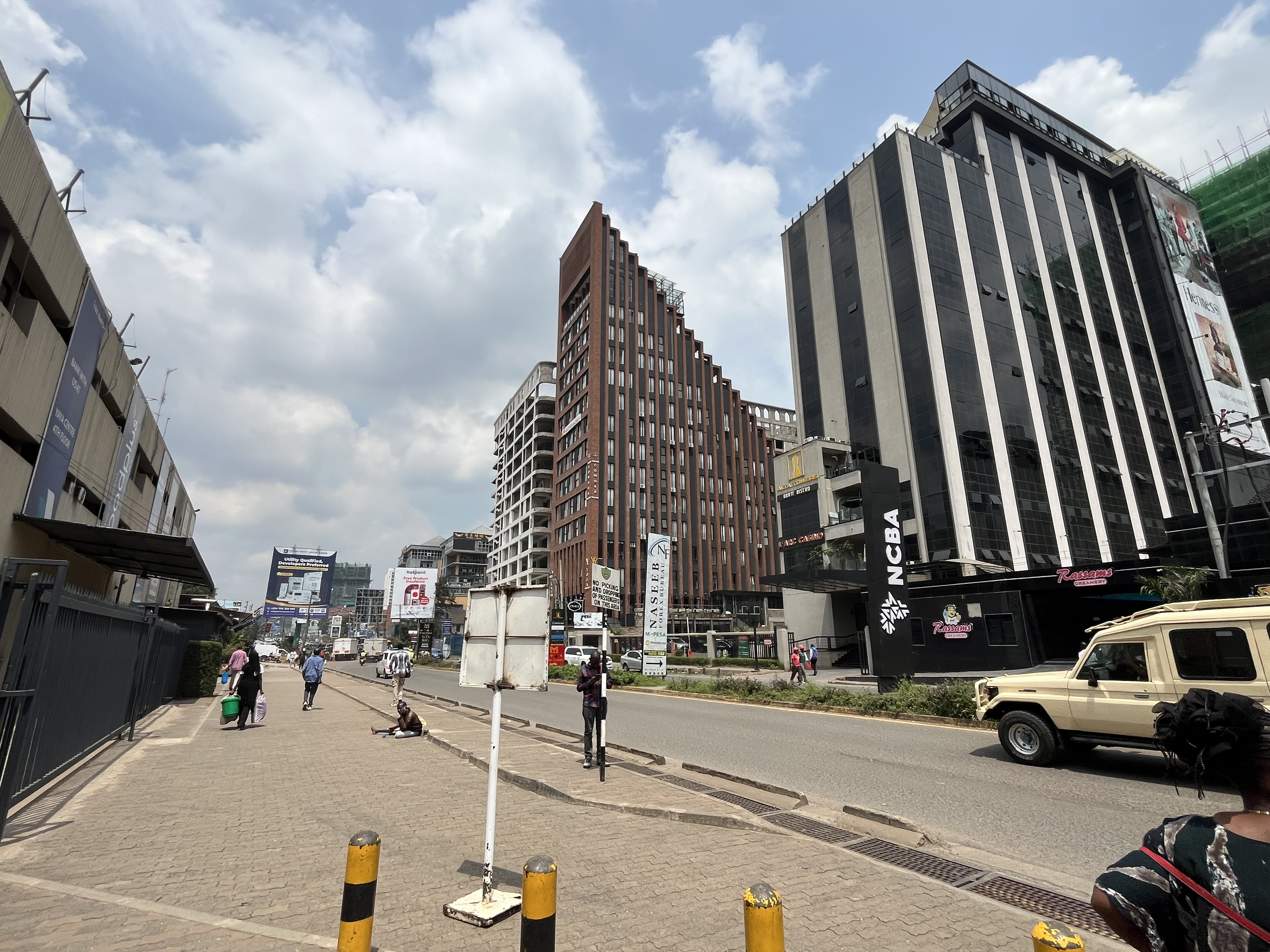

- Location of Kilimani, Nairobi in Kenya
- Coordinates: 01°17′06″S 36°47′12″E
- Country: Kenya
- County: Nairobi City
- Sub-county: Westlands
- Elevation: 1,700 m (5,600 ft)

Kilimani is a mixed-use commercial and residential neighbourhood in the city of Nairobi.

== Overview ==
Kilimani is generally considered an upper-middle-income mixed-use area, with residential buildings alongside shops and offices. Kilimani has long been a popular residential area for expatriates. It continues to attract expatriates alongside Kenyan residents.

Kilimani hosts State House, the official residence of the President of Kenya. The area is also home to several public institutions, embassies and international organisations. These include the Ministry of Defence, based at Ulinzi House on Lenana Road.

Kilimani has long attracted artists, musicians and arts collectives, with cultural centres such as Kuona and PAWA254 contributing to its arts scene. The neighbourhood has a wide selection of restaurants, cafés, bars and nightclubs. In 2022, Time Out ranked Kilimani 28th among the world's 51 coolest neighbourhoods, highlighting its arts, dining and nightlife.

Kilimani has been an important centre of Kenya's technology and entrepreneurship ecosystem since the early 2010s, hosting innovation hubs such as iHub and Nailab.

Concerns have been raised about high-rise developments in breach of county bylaws, placing pressure on existing infrastructure. This has prompted descriptions such as "vertical slums" in media reports. Residents of Kilimani and Kileleshwa have also raised concerns about noise from nightclubs.

In March 2024, Nairobi Governor Johnson Sakaja proposed rezoning that would allow buildings of up to 75 floors in Kilimani, Kileleshwa and Lavington.

=== Location ===
Kilimani lies approximately 5 kilometres (3 mi) west of Nairobi's central business district, within Westlands Sub-county. It lies north of Woodley and east of Kileleshwa, from which it is largely separated by the Kirichwa River. The larger Kilimani sub-location includes the Kilimani estates and part of Upper Hill, including Hurlingham and Caledonia.

Neighbouring areas include Kileleshwa to the north, Lavington to the west, Woodley to the south and Upper Hill to the east. Hurlingham is described both as part of the wider Kilimani area and as a neighbouring area.

== History ==
Kilimani developed during the colonial era as a residential area for Europeans, consisting mainly of bungalows and maisonettes. In the early 1960s, it became racially desegregated, while remaining a low-density residential area. Over subsequent decades, Kilimani gradually densified into a mixed-use district.

In the 2000s, construction of offices, shopping facilities and high-rise housing accelerated, raising concerns that roads, drainage, water supply and other infrastructure were not keeping pace.

== Points of interest ==
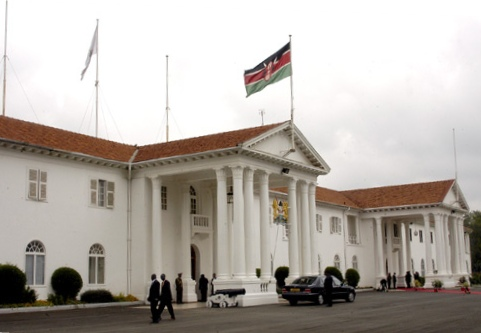
State House, in the Kilimani area of Nairobi

=== State House ===
State House Nairobi, the official residence of the President of Kenya is located in Kilimani, on State House Road. State House also serves as the President's principal workplace.

=== Public institutions ===
In addition to State House, the Kilimani area is home to several Kenyan public institutions, including the Ministry of Defence, the National Irrigation Authority, the Pharmacy and Poisons Board, the Kenya National Commission on Human Rights, and the Kenya Medical Practitioners and Dentists Council.

=== Embassies ===
Kilimani hosts several embassies and high commissions, including those of Burundi, China, Thailand, and Nigeria.

=== International organisations ===
Kilimani has long been home to several international organisations, including the Africa regional office of the International Federation of Red Cross and Red Crescent Societies, the global HQ of Oxfam International, the Nairobi office of Interpeace, the regional office of the Forum for African Women Educationalists, the RefuSHE Kenya HQ, and the Africa Alliance of YMCAs.

=== Schools ===
Kilimani has a number of international schools and upmarket local schools.

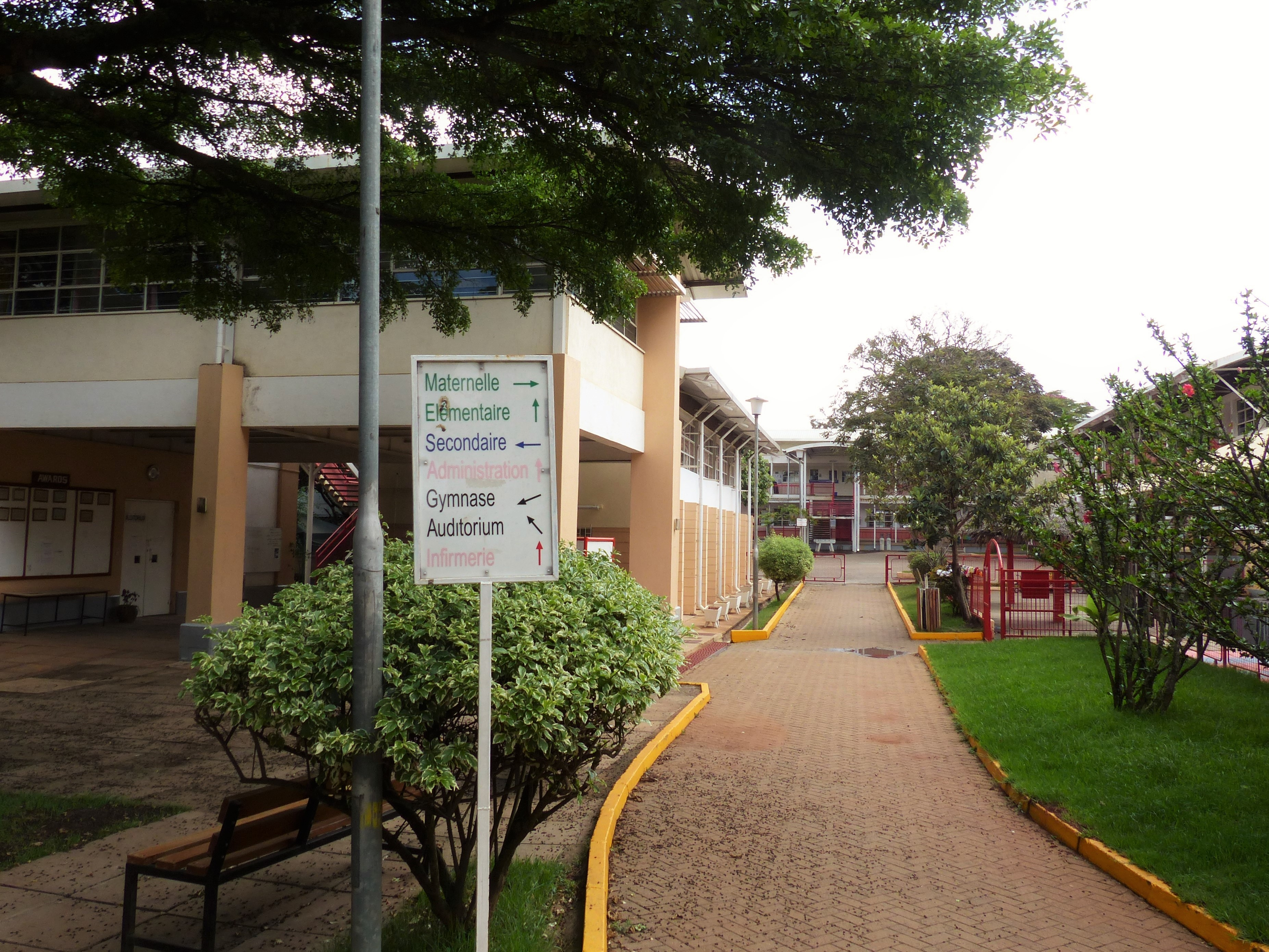
Lycée Denis Diderot in Nairobi

==== International schools ====
- The Lycée Denis Diderot, the French international school, moved to Kilimani in 1972.
- Svenska Skolan, the Swedish international school.
- West Nairobi School, a Christian international school, opened in Kilimani in 1996 but moved to Karen in 2000.

==== Kenyan schools ====
- Kilimani Primary School
- Milimani Primary School
- St Hannah's School
- St. Nicholas School
- St Christophers School
- Cavina School
- State House Girls' School, located on the grounds of State House Nairobi.

=== Innovation hubs and coworking spaces ===
Kilimani was an early centre of Nairobi's technology and entrepreneurship ecosystem. iHub opened in March 2010, bringing together technology entrepreneurs and innovators. Their office also housed Nailab, an incubator supporting technology start-ups. In 2024, iHub relocated Lavington, immediately adjacent to Kilimani.

Iran's Innovation and Technology House (iHiT) promotes technology and trade links between Kenya and Iran. It provides coworking and event spaces and hosts networking events for entrepreneurs.

Other coworking facilities include Nairobi Garage and Workify Kilimani.

=== Arts and culture ===
Kuona Artists Collective was established in Kilimani in 2017 following the closure of Kuona Trust. Unseen Nairobi is a popular rooftop cinema that hosts film screenings and festivals. PAWA254 is an arts and cultural organisation that supports creative projects addressing social issues.

=== Banks and financial institutions ===
Kilimani hosts the headquarters of Kenyan banks Sidian Bank and Kingdom Bank.

The Trade and Development Bank opened its Eastern Africa regional headquarters at TDB Tower on Lenana Road in 2022.

=== Shopping malls ===
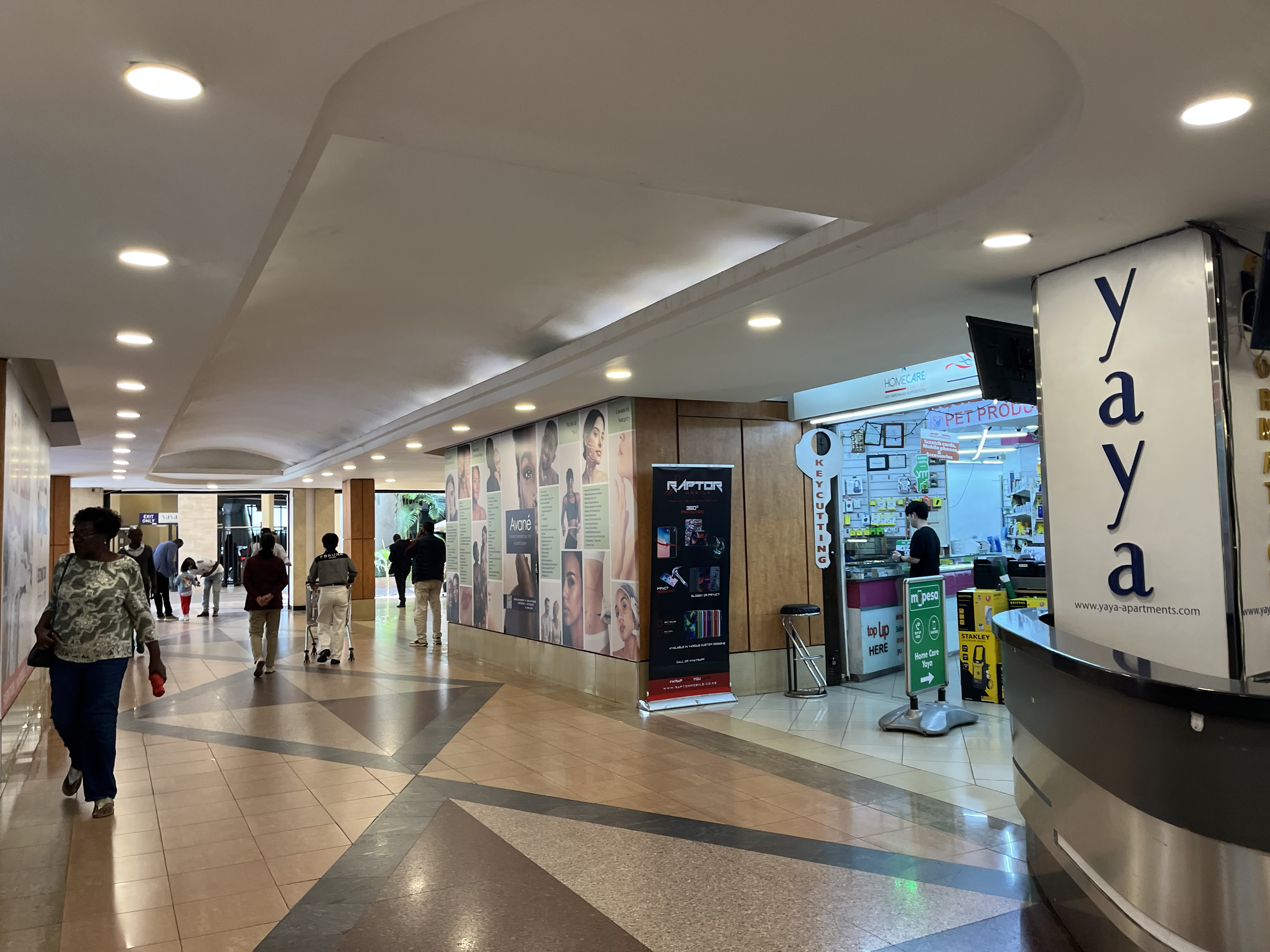
Yaya Centre

The Yaya Centre is a shopping mall with over 100 retail shops. It was built in 1992, and was one of Kenya's first modern shopping malls. Its presence made Kilimani synonymous with shopping. The area has since attracted several other malls.

Adam's Arcade, a smaller, classic shopping centre in neighbouring Woodley, was developed by Abdul Habib Adam and opened in 1959.

Prestige Plaza on Ngong Road opened its doors in 2003, offering shopping, dining and entertainment facilities. It underwent a major renovation and expansion in 2025

More recent additions to the area include Adlife Plaza, combining shops, restaurants, night clubs, and office space, as well as Kilimani Mall, and The Circle Mall (June 2024).

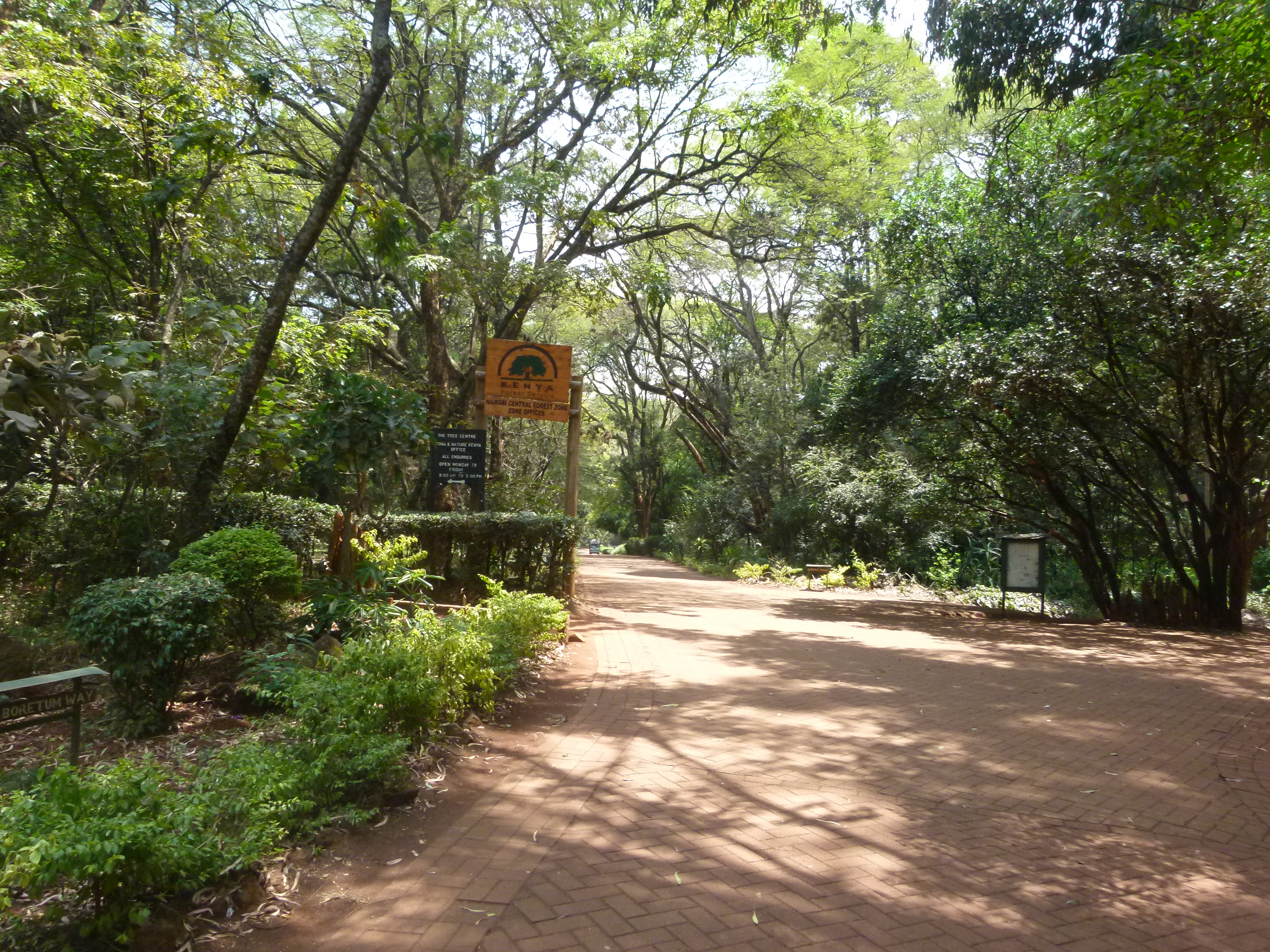
Nairobi Arboretum

=== Nairobi Arboretum ===
The Nairobi Arboretum, featuring more than 300 exotic and indigenous tree species, is located in Kilimani, adjacent to State House.

== Restaurants, bars and nightlife ==
Kilimani's nightlife date back several decades, and the area has long been home to some of Nairobi's most popular restaurants. Buffalo Bill's was one of Nairobi's most popular and notorious nightspots from the 1970s to the early 2000s, at what later became the Heron Hotel. Cedars, a Lebanese restaurant that still operates, opened in October 1998.

In 2022, Time Out ranked Kilimani 28th among the world's 51 coolest neighbourhoods, citing its restaurants, cafés, bars and nightclubs. Mama Oliech, a famous local Luo-style fish restaurant, has hosted several international celebrities, including Mark Zuckerberg and Idris Elba.

The increasing number of nightclubs has drawn complaints about noise from Kilimani residents. In 2024, Nairobi County and the National Environment Management Authority took action against several clubs, announcing immediate closure unless they stopped playing loud music.

== See also ==
- List of cities in Kenya
