= South B =

Area of Nairobi, Kenya

Coordinates: 1°18′36″S 36°49′59″E

South B is the name of a Division of the sub-county of Starehe in Nairobi, Kenya and the name of a "sub-location" of Mukuru Nyayo within the Division. The 2019 Kenya Census gives a population of 102,441 for South B Division and 34,216 for the sub-location. South B is about 3 kilometres (1.9 mi) south-east of Nairobi Central Business District; the Industrial Area lies to the east and the South C district to the south-west.

South B has middle class houses ranging from the tiled-roofed Plainsview estate to the metal-roofed Mariakani estate. The Mariakani estate of 30 blocks of eight flats was built by Nairobi City Council in around 1970, over an area of 10 acres (4.0 ha). Ownership was transferred to the Local Authorities Pension Fund in 2013 in a debt-for-asset swap to help make up a shortfall in the fund caused by the failure of the council to pay over contributions deducted from employees' pay. Legendary Kenyan footballer, Joe Kadenge was a resident of the Mariakani estate and in 2016 President Uhuru Kenyatta visited his home. The Diamond Park I and Diamond Park II Estates are along the Likoni road. Other communities consist of stand alone houses and high rise apartments such as Balozi, Hazina, SanaSana, Golden Gate, Sore Drive, Githeri Drive and Rise.

On the eastern side of South B in a loop of the Ngong river is the informal settlement or slum of Fuata Nyayo. It forms part of the larger Mukuru slums area. According to a 2009 report on Nairobi slums by Slum Dwellers International Fuato Nyayo is named after the slogan of former President Daniel Moi's, Kenya African National Union (KANU) political party "in the footsteps". The area bordering the Mater Hospital is the informal settlement of Mariguini village, built on a banana farm in the early 1980s. Children here attend the Mariakani Primary School.

The number 11 matatus (Minibuses - Public Transport PSVs) runs to Nairobi railway station. There is a shopping centre and the Capital Centre Mall.

Educational institutions include the Kenya Institute of Mass Communication (KIMC), Nairobi South Primary, Our Lady Queen of Peace Secondary School and Our Lady of Mercy Primary School and Highway Secondary School.

Health facilities include The Mater Misericordiae Hospital, Mariakani Cottage Hospital, South B Hospital and South B Dental Care.

The Winners' Chapel church on Likoni Road has the largest church span in East and Central Africa.
