= Ngara, Nairobi =

Commercial and residential neighbourhood in Nairobi, Kenya

Ngara
- Location of Ngara in Kenya
- Coordinates: 01°16′29″S 36°49′44″E
- Country: Kenya
- County: Nairobi City
- Sub-county: Starehe

Area
  - Total: 2.6 km^{2} (1.0 sq mi)

Population (2019)
  - Total: 31,132
  - Density: 11,860/km^{2} (30,700/sq mi)

Ngara is a commercial and residential suburb of Nairobi. Located within the larger Starehe Sub-county, it is approximately 1.7 kilometres (1.1 mi) northeast of Nairobi's central business district along Muranga Road.

== Location ==
Ngara is located approximately 1.7 kilometres (1 mi) northeast of Nairobi's central business district, within the sub-county of Starehe. It is divided into two Ngara East and Ngara West by Murang'a Road. It is located south of Parklands; west of Pangani; north of Kariokor.

== Overview ==
In the early 20th century, Ngara and the southern parts of Parklands were the formal settlement for the Asian community that came to British East Africa to assist in the railway construction. However, Ngara especially Ngara East, has changed over the years and it's become ethnically diverse, with affordable housing for the low-middle to low-income earners, especially students.

Ngara has transformed into a high-density suburb with a number of high-rise flats coming up as well the national and city government launching affordable housing in the area. Ngara Civil Servant Housing, Ngara Housing Project, as well as the neighbouring suburb's Pangani Housing Project. The government is demolishing low-rise structures and replacing with the taller structures that can hold more housing units, an effort to curb the housing deficit in the city.

Its current representative in the Nairobi County Assembly is Hon. Mwaura Chege.

== Points of interest ==
1. The Kenya Institute of Curriculum Development (KICD), along Desai Road, off Murang'a Road.
2. The National Museums of Kenya, a state corporation that manages museums, sites and monuments in Kenya, along Kipande Road.
3. The Ngara Girls' High School, a boarding secondary education institution.
