= Arya Samaj in Kenya =

AUM or OM is considered by the Arya Samaj to be the highest and most proper name of God.

The Arya Samaj was founded in Nairobi on 5 July 1903, at a meeting at the home of Jai Gopal attended by forty-five people. The small group of Arya Samajis immediately began plans for a centre for its members and on 11 September 1903, the foundation for the first Arya Samaj building in East Africa was laid. Today there is a seven-storey building on this site.

== Contribution to education ==
With the increase in the Indian population in Nairobi, the need for educational facilities grew and the Arya Samaj started the first school for girls in Nairobi in 1910. Later three more schools were established by the Arya Samaj in Nairobi. Admission to these schools was open to students of all races and students were mostly exempt from paying fees. The Arya Samaj also helped maintain a crematorium, held evening classes for adults, starting in 1924 and free of tuition fees, provided a public library service and provided relief during natural disasters. The Arya Samaj donated a hall for use by a prominent high school in Nairobi. In 1950 the Arya samaj had started a Hindi class for indigenous Kenyans.

== Arya Stri Samaj ==
Arya Stri Samaj (Women's Arya Samaj) was established in Nairobi in 1919. It started with only a few members and has grown to over two hundred. It holds regular meetings and arranges lectures on religious and social matters. It owns a building and runs a nursery established in 1949. It also organises sewing and music classes for women.

== Visiting preachers ==
The Arya Samaj organised for a number of distinguished preachers to visit East Africa. These preachers became a source of inspiration to the local Hindus. They taught Vedic religion to the African people, visited small towns in East Africa and established a number of centres where Hindi was taught in addition to Vedic religion.

== Social and cultural contribution ==
An Aryan Club was established in Nairobi, open to people of all races, and members of the club distinguished themselves in sporting activities. A free public dispensary is run by the Arya Samaj in Nairobi.

== Arya Pratinidhi Sabha of East Africa ==
An Arya Samaj was formed in Mombasa, the second largest city in Kenya, in 1904. Its activities mirrored those of the Samaj in Nairobi as it built a temple, established a Youth Wing, held weekly services, built a nursery and a school and formed an Aryan Club. In 1922, the Arya Pratinidhi Sabha of Eastern Africa was formed to coordinate the activities of all the Arya Samajs in East Africa and at present there are nineteen affiliated Arya Samajs.

== Present status of Arya Samaj in East Africa ==
Arya Samaj were initially established during British colonial rule when there was a large influx of Indian migrants into East Africa, but had to adapt with changing conditions. There was mass migration of Indians out of East Africa following independence but the Samaj has maintained its presence in East Africa. At present the Samaj makes valuable contribution to uplift the condition of the African people.
