= Nairobi Arboretum =

Arboretum in Nairobi, Kenya

Coordinates: 1.2743°S 36.8131°E

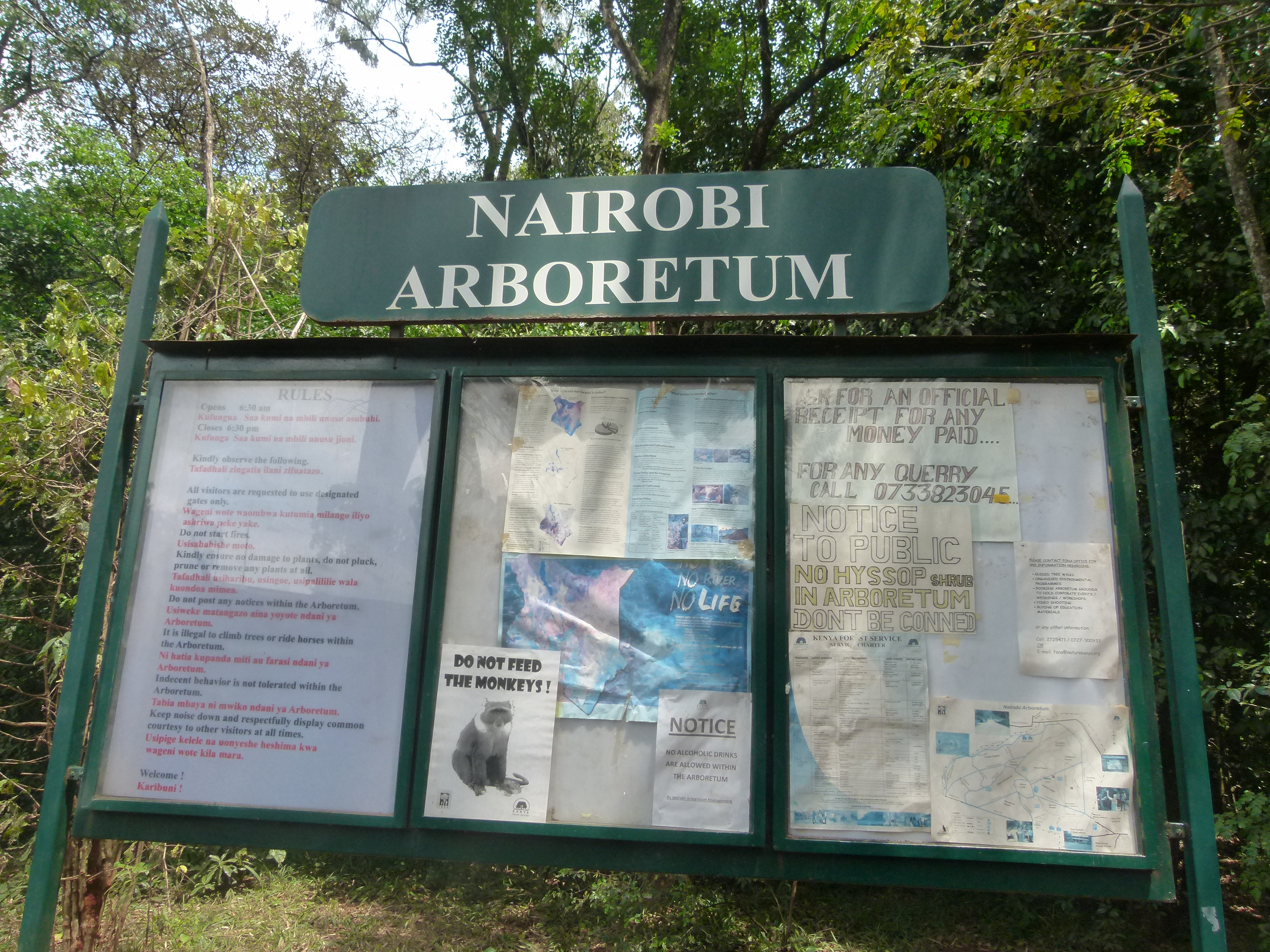
The welcome signage of the Nairobi Arboretum

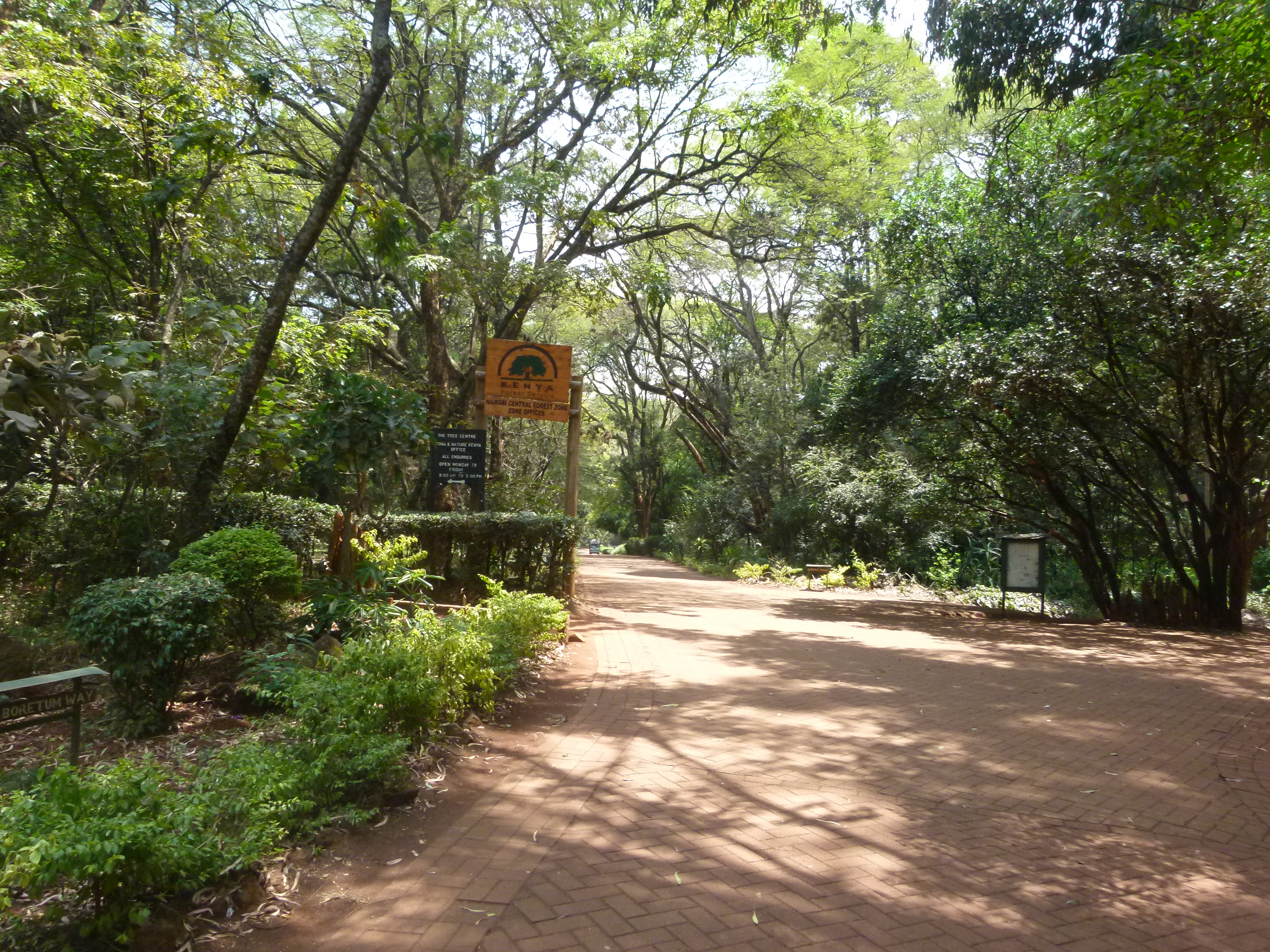
The entry path of the Nairobi Arboretum

Nairobi Arboretum is located along state house road in the area of Kilimani, Nairobi, Kenya. It was founded in 1907 by Mr. Batiscombe in a bid to try out new forestry trees. It was later gazetted as a national reserve in 1932 by the government and issuance of a title deed was later conducted by the commissioner of lands to the government in 1996.
