= Westlands, Nairobi =

Neighbourhood in Nairobi, Kenya

Westlands
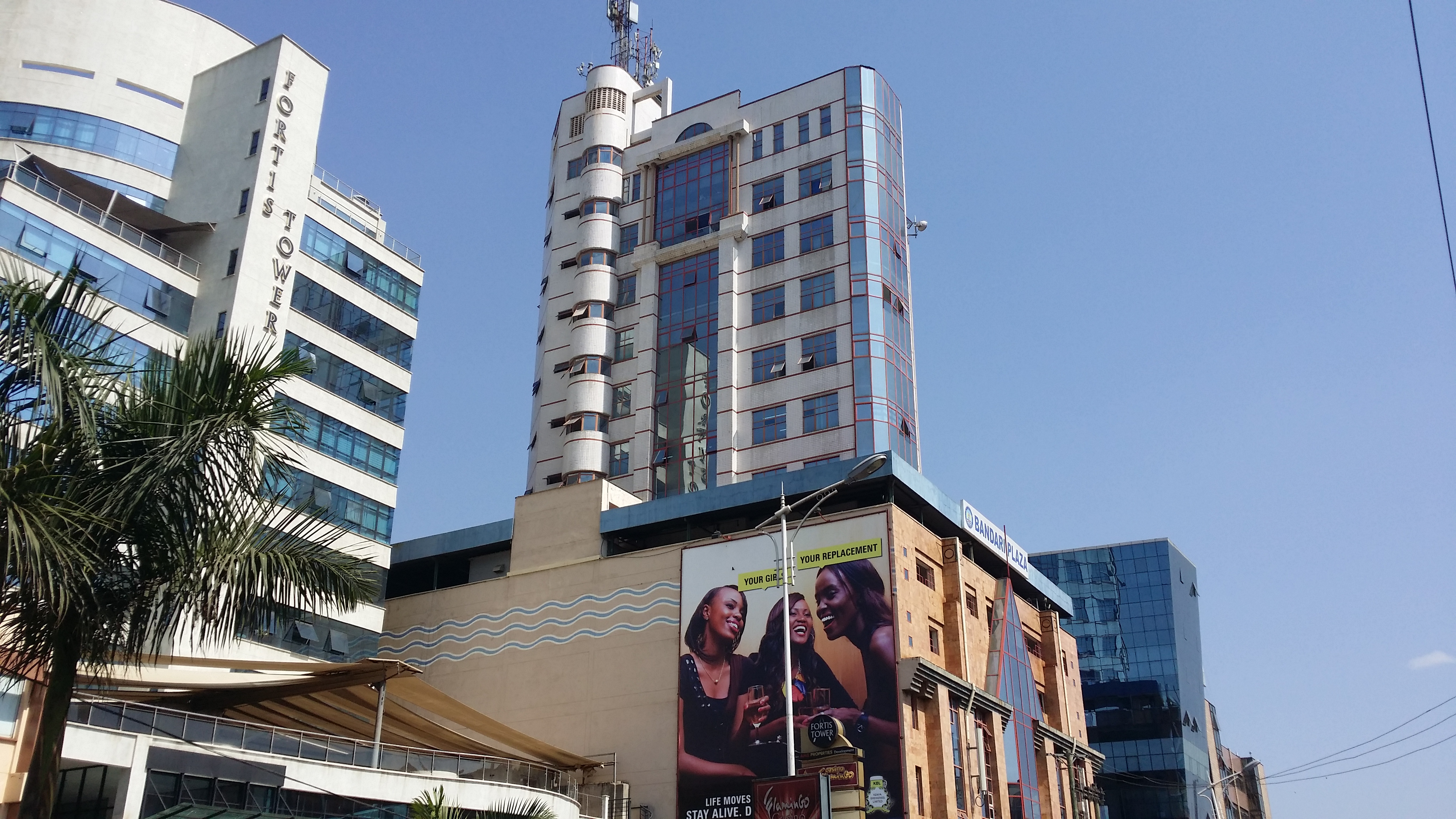
- Woodvale Grove, Westlands, Nairobi
- Nickname: Westie
- Location of Westlands in Kenya
- Coordinates: 01°16′12″S 36°48′36″E
- Country: Kenya
- County: Nairobi County
- City: Nairobi
- City Division: Westlands

Government
  - Type: Nairobi County
  - Governor: Johnson Sakaja

Area
  - Land: 37.6 sq mi (97.5 km^{2})
- Elevation: 5,600 ft (1,700 m)

Westlands is a mixed-use neighbourhood in Upper Parklands in Nairobi. Located 3.0 kilometres (2 mi) from Nairobi's central business district, it sits on the westerly areas of the larger Parklands area of Nairobi.

== Location ==
Westlands is located approximately 3.2 kilometres (2 mi), by road, northwest of the central business district of Nairobi. The geographical coordinates of the neighbourhood are: 01°16'01.0"S, 36°48'42.0"E (Latitude:-1.266944; Longitude:36.811667).

== Overview ==
Westlands is a mixed-use neighbourhood in Nairobi, combining residential, commercial, retail, hospitality and office functions. It developed on the western side of the city near Parklands and is closely connected to the central business district, Riverside, Parklands, Muthaiga, Lavington and the wider western corridor of Nairobi. The area is commonly known by the nickname "Westie".

During the 1990s and early 2000s, more businesses moved from Nairobi's central business district to Westlands and Upper Hill as land and office space in the city centre became more expensive and limited. This shift helped Westlands grow into one of Nairobi's main decentralised commercial districts, attracting offices, hotels, shopping centres, hospitals, restaurants, entertainment venues and residential developments.

Westlands is also associated with upper-middle-income and high-income residential demand. The Standard reported, using census data, that Westlands was among the areas of Nairobi with a sizable population of wealthier residents. Muthaiga, which lies to the north-east of Westlands and falls within the wider Westlands administrative area, has also been described as one of Nairobi's most affluent residential neighbourhoods.

The neighbourhood has experienced increased high-rise and mixed-use development, especially along and around Waiyaki Way, Chiromo Lane, Woodvale Grove, Mpaka Road and nearby commercial streets. The Global Trade Centre, located at the intersection of Waiyaki Way and Chiromo Lane, is one of the area's major mixed-use developments and includes office, hotel, residential and retail components.

The growth of commercial and residential development has also created planning and infrastructure pressure. In 2026, the Nairobi City County government was reported to be preparing a local physical and land use development plan for Westlands after a surge in high-rise construction placed strain on infrastructure and amenities in the area.

== Economy and real estate ==
Westlands has developed from a primarily residential neighbourhood on the western side of Nairobi into one of the city's main mixed-use commercial districts. Its location between the central business district, Parklands, Riverside, Lavington and the wider western corridor has supported offices, hotels, shopping centres, restaurants, hospitals, serviced apartments and high-density residential development. The area is served by major transport routes including Waiyaki Way and links to the Nairobi Expressway.

Commercial activity in Westlands is connected to Nairobi's wider office market. The district is commonly grouped with Upper Hill among the city's main decentralised office nodes, attracting banks, professional services firms, technology companies, hospitality operators and regional offices. Knight Frank reported that prime office occupancy in Nairobi increased from 77.71 per cent in June 2025 to 81.58 per cent by December 2025, with key office locations such as Westlands and Upper Hill benefiting from demand for higher-quality office space.

The Global Trade Centre, located at the intersection of Waiyaki Way and Chiromo Lane, is one of the major mixed-use developments in Westlands. The development includes office, hotel, residential and retail components and reflects the area's shift toward high-rise and mixed-use urban development.

Westlands has also become a significant apartment and off-plan residential market. Residential demand is influenced by proximity to offices, retail centres, hotels, hospitals, schools, entertainment venues and road links to the central business district, Riverside, Parklands, Gigiri and the wider western suburbs. Local property-market guides identify building management, parking provision, service charges, rental demand, resale liquidity, unit size and competition from new supply as important considerations for buyers and investors in the area.

Rapid high-rise and mixed-use development has also raised planning and infrastructure concerns. In 2026, Nairobi City County was reported to be preparing a local physical and land use development plan for Westlands after increased building activity placed pressure on infrastructure and services in the area.

== Points of interest ==
In Westlands or near the boundaries of the neighbourhood, there are several points of interest, including the following:

- UNHCR branch office in Kenya
- Nairobi Global Trade Centre, a mixed-use development on Waiyaki Way and Chiromo Lane
- The Sarit Centre Shopping Mall
- Catholic Relief Services - East Africa Regional Office
- The Ukay Shopping Mall
- The Westgate Shopping Mall
- The M. P. Shah Hospital, a private hospital
- Unga House - An office high-rise building
- Mpaka Road - Many businesses have offices on this street
- USAID Towers - The headquarters of USAID in Kenya
- The High Commission of Botswana to Kenya
- The Embassy of Norway to Kenya
- The Embassy of Sweden to Kenya
- Westlands Office Park
- Westlands Primary School
- Datoo's Glassware Mart Ltd
- An office of PricewaterhouseCoopers
- Sankara Hotel
- Dusit D2
- Phillips Pharmaceuticals head office
- Delta Towers
- Safaricom head office
- Art Cafe head office
- Java head office
- Villa Rosa Kempinski Nairobi
- Movenpick Hotel
- A branch of Woolworth Stores
- The Nairobi Institute of Technology

== Westlands Division ==
Prior to 2013, a division named after Westlands was also one of the eight administrative divisions of Nairobi, which is coterminous with Nairobi City. The other divisions were Central, Dagoretti, Embakasi, Kasarani, Kibera, Makadara and Pumwani.

Areas in the Westlands Division were:

- Parklands
- Kitisuru
- Highridge
- Kangemi
- Kilimani
- Lavington
- Muthaiga

Currently, there is a constituency and a sub-county named after Westlands; Westlands Constituency is one of the 17 constituencies of Nairobi and Westlands Sub-county is one of the 11 sub-counties of Nairobi.

The postal code for Westlands is 00800.

== Deep Sea Settlement ==
Within the Westlands Division lies the Deep Sea Settlement. This is a shanty town of approximately 7,000 inhabitants. In 2005 a private firm, with police support, began bulldozing homes, an act the Kenyan high court deemed illegal. Poverty is rife and is exacerbated by the area's poor sanitation.

In 2021, a significant part of the southern areas of the settlement was cleared to enable the construction of the long-planned Parklands section of the Ring Road.

== Education ==
The Lycée Denis Diderot opened in Westlands as the École française à Nairobi in 1962. It moved to Kilimani in 1972. There are many other educational institutions in Westlands Division, as detailed in this reference.

== See also ==
- Eastleigh, Nairobi
