= Parklands, Nairobi =

Parklands
- Location of Parklands in Kenya
- Coordinates: 01°15′35″S 36°49′04″E
- Country: Kenya
- County: Nairobi
- Elevation: 5,600 ft (1,700 m)

Population (2009 Census)
  - Total: 38,344

Parklands is a neighbourhood in the city of Nairobi, the capital and largest city in Kenya. It is divided into numbered avenues. The name arises from the proximity of the area to City Park, Nairobi.

== Location ==
Parklands is located approximately 5 kilometres (3.1 mi), by road, north-northwest of the central business district of Nairobi. The coordinates of Parklands are:01 15 36S, 36 49 05E (Latitude:-1.2600; Longitude:36.8180).

== Overview ==
During Kenya's colonial days, the British demarcated the area as a residential neighbourhood for civil servants. During the 1940s and 1950s Parklands was one of the most congested suburban areas of the Nairobi metropolitan area. In the second decade of the 2000s Parklands is a mixed commercial/residential neighbourhood. The relative availability and comparatively reasonably priced land in the area attracts business and residential real estate development, away from the relative lack and exorbitant pricing of real estate in Nairobi's central business district, to the south of Parklands. Parklands has a significant population of people of Asian descent.

== Population ==
The population of Parklands is 38,344 as of 2009.

== Education ==
When Ngara High School was first founded as a mixed-sex education school in 1957, it primarily served Kenyans of South Asian origin in Parklands and Ngara. Several Primary and Secondary Schools are in Parklands both government and private.

== Landmarks ==
In Parklands, or near the boundaries of the neighbourhood, there are several landmarks, including the following:

- Aga Khan University Hospital, Nairobi
- Offices of Swiss International Air Lines
- Aga Khan Sports Centre
- Diamond Plaza
- City Park Market
- City Park Arena
- Dr. Ribeiro Parklands School

== Westlands division ==
Administratively, Parklands is a subdivision of the Westlands Administrative Division of the city of Nairobi. The division consists of the following six subdivisions (locations):

- Parklands
- Kitisuru
- Highridge
- Kangemi
- Kilimani
- Lavington

== See also ==
- Westlands
- Upper Hill, Nairobi
- Nairobi
- Eastleigh, Nairobi
