= Westlands Constituency =

Kenyan electoral constituency

Westlands
- constituency for the Parliament of Kenya
- Westlands constituency within Nairobi City County

- Nairobi City County in Kenya
- County: Nairobi City
- Population: 308,854
- Area: 72.4 km^{2} (28.0 sq mi)

Current constituency
- Created: 1963
- Number of members: One
- Party: ODM
- Member of Parliament: Tim Wanyonyi

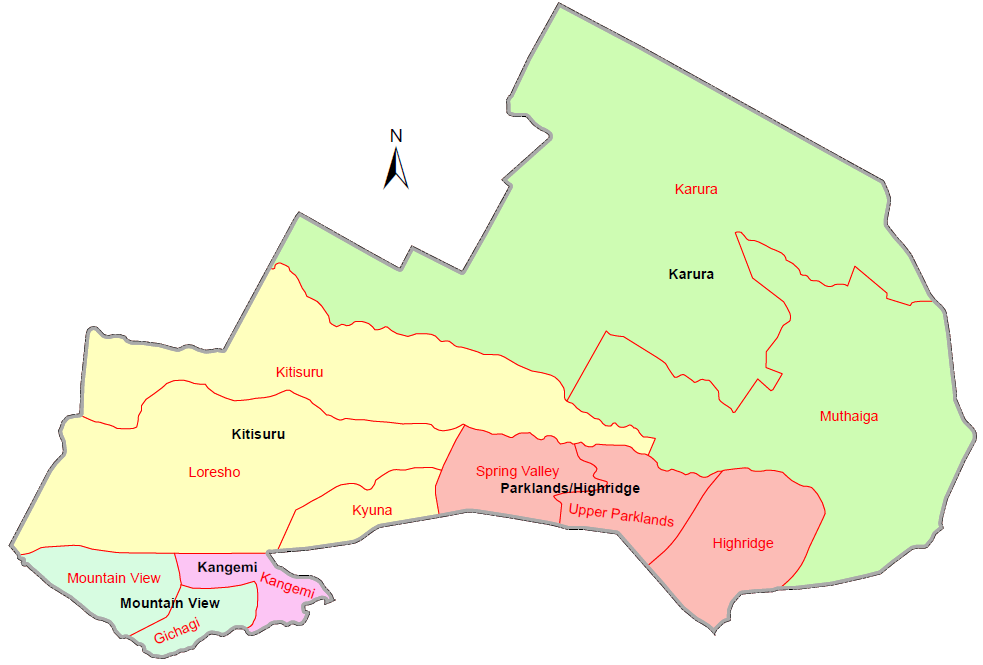
Westlands Constituency, IEBC March 2012

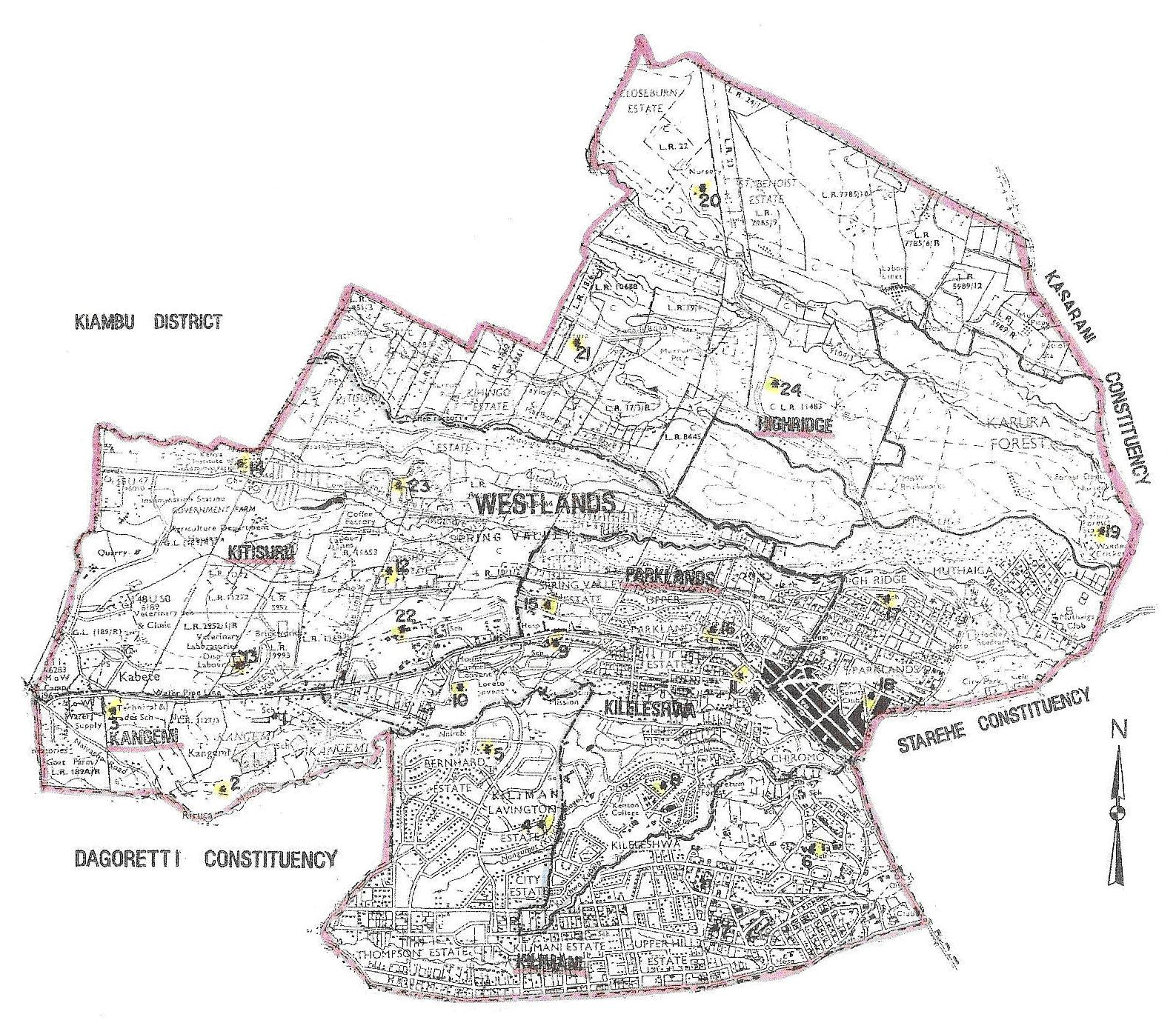
Westlands Constituency 1997-2012 (Kenya)

Westlands is an electoral constituency in Kenya. It is one of the seventeen constituencies in Nairobi County. The constituency is situated within Westlands Sub-county, formerly Westlands District. The entire constituency is located within Nairobi City County and has an area of 72.4 km^{2} (28.0 sq mi). It was known as Nairobi Northwest Constituency at the 1963 elections, then as Parklands Constituency and since 1988 elections it has been known as Westlands Constituency.

In 2013, the Independent Electoral and Boundaries Commission hived off a portion of Westlands Constituency to form part of Dagoretti North Constituency.

Westlands constituency contains some of the high income suburb areas such as Runda, LakeView, Muthaiga, Kitisuru and Highridge. Slum areas like Kangemi, Githogoro, DeepSea, Mji Wa Huruma, Kaptagat, Kibagare, Maasai and Suswa are also located within the constituency.

== Members of Parliament ==
Elections	MP	Party	Notes
1963	Fitz Remedios Santana de Souza	KANU	
1969	Samuel Kivuitu	KANU	One-party system
1974	Isaac Waweru	KANU	One-party system
1979	Krishan Chander Gautama	KANU	One-party system
1983	Samuel Kivuitu	KANU	One-party system.
1988	Njoroge Mungai	KANU	One-party system.
1992	Amin Walji	KANU	Walji died during his tenure
1994	Fred Gumo	KANU	By-elections
1997	Fred Gumo	KANU	
2002	Fred Gumo	NARC	
2007	Fred Gumo	ODM	
2013	Timothy Wanyonyi Wetangula	ODM	
2017	Timothy Wanyonyi Wetangula	ODM	
2022	Timothy Wanyonyi Wetangula	ODM	

== Locations and wards ==
Ward	Population	km^{2}	County Assembly Representative
Kitisuru	31,202	21.3	Alvin Alango PalaPala ODM
Parklands/Highridge	38,344	8.2	Jeffer Abdulwahab Kassam ODM
Karura	26,453	38.2	Kamau Thuo FiuNifiu TNA
Kangemi	45,564	1.6	Peter Vukindu Isuha ODM
Mountain View	36,126	3.1	Beatrice Kwamboka Makori ODM

== Westlands Sub-county ==
The Sub-county shares the same boundaries with what was Westlands Division of Nairobi and constituency prior to 2013. Some areas that are electorally placed under Dagoretti North Constituency such as: Kilimani, Lavington, Muthangari, Maziwa and Kileleshwa, form part of the sub-county. The sub-county is Deputy County Commissioner, working under the Ministry of Interior.
