= List of Blackrock Rugby Festival winners =

This is a list of previous winners of the Blackrock Rugby Festival, which was established in 1983. Rift Valley Academy holds the most titles of any school at 14 titles.

The Main Cup had been competed for by all teams since 1983, but from 2000, it was decided that the top team of each group would qualify for the quarter-finals of the Main Cup, while the second and third-placed team of each group would qualify for the quarter-finals of the Plate and Bowl Cup respectively.

In 2022, the competition was played in a seven-a-side format instead of the regular fifteen-a-side format while in 2023, 2024, 2025 and 2026, the competition was played in a ten-a-side format.

== Main cup ==
Year	Winner	Runners-up	MVP	School
1983	Lenana School	Nairobi School		
1984	(Zimbabwe) Ellis Robins School	Rift Valley Academy		
1985	Rift Valley Academy	Lenana School		
1986	Lenana School	Nairobi School		
1987	Rift Valley Academy	Lenana School	Martin Ndeda	Lenana School
1988	Rift Valley Academy	St Marys	Jack Wilson	
1989	Nairobi School,	St. Mary's School,		
1990	Rift Valley Academy	Lenana School		
1991	Rift Valley Academy	Lenana School		
1992	Rift Valley Academy	St Marys School		
1993	Lenana School	St Marys School		
1994	St. Mary's School	Njoro Boys		
1995	St. Mary's School	Upper Hill School		
1996	St. Mary's School	Nairobi School	Paul Odera	St. Mary's School
1997	St. Mary's School	Rift Valley Academy	Allan Hicks	St. Mary's School
1998	St. Mary's School	Rift Valley Academy	Allan Hicks	St. Mary's School
1999	St. Mary's School	Rift Valley Academy	Antony Gachanja	St. Mary's School
2000	Rift Valley Academy	St. Mary's School I	Kiptubei	Rift Valley Academy
2001	Nakuru High School	Nairobi School	Innocent Simiyu	Nairobi School
2002	Lenana School	St. Mary's School I	John Warui	Lenana School
2003	Nakuru High School	St. Mary's School I	Newton Tonui	Nakuru High School
2004	St. Mary's School I	Imani School	Andrew Radier	St. Mary's School
2005	St. Mary's School I	Nairobi School	Biko Adema	St. Mary's School
2006	Rift Valley Academy	St. Mary's School	Odeke Ekirapa	Rift Valley Academy
2007	Rift Valley Academy	Strathmore School II	Nur Malmo	Rift Valley Academy
2008	Strathmore School II	Rift Valley Academy	Joseph Kimeu	Strathmore School
2009	Upper Hill School	Strathmore School I	David Ambunya	St. Mary's School
2010	St. Mary's School I	Strathmore School I	Nawfal Cockar	St. Mary's School
2011	St. Mary's School I	(Uganda) Hana Mixed Secondary School	Philip Wokorach	(Uganda) Hana Mixed Secondary School
2012	Nairobi School	St. Mary's School I	Nigel Mutebi	St. Mary's School
2013	Maseno School	Rift Valley Academy	Jin Sasaki	Rift Valley Academy
2014	Rift Valley Academy	Maseno School	Samuel Scheenstra	Rift Valley Academy
2015	Maseno School	Strathmore School I	Donn Victor	Maseno School
2016	Lenana School	Rift Valley Academy	Arnold Mwita	Lenana School
2017	Rift Valley Academy	St. Mary's School	Douglas Kahuri	St. Mary's School
2018	Ofafa Jericho High School	Rift Valley Academy	Janrich Volshenk	Rift Valley Academy
2019	Dagoretti High School	Rift Valley Academy	Micah Smith	Rift Valley Academy
2020	Season not Played Due to the COVID-19 pandemic			
2021	Season not Played Due to the COVID-19 pandemic			
2022	Rift Valley Academy I	Strathmore School	Matthew Mandi	Strathmore School
2023	Rosslyn Academy	Rift Valley Academy I	Josiah Clermont	Rift Valley Academy I
2024	Rift Valley Academy I	Dawamu School	Caleb Tanner	Rift Valley Academy I
2025	All Saints Embu High School I	Rift Valley Academy I	Josephat Karanja	All Saints Embu High School I
2026	Rift Valley Academy I	International Schools Select	Josh Fader	Rift Valley Academy I

== Plate Cup ==
Year	Winner	Runners-up
2000	Nakuru High School	St. Mary's School II
2001	St. Mary's School I	Moi Forces Academy, Nairobi
2002	Sunshine Secondary School	Moi Forces Academy, Nairobi
2003	Dagoretti High School	Rift Valley Academy
2004	Nakuru High School	St. Mary's School II
2005	Nairobi School II	Strathmore School II
2006	Lenana School	St. Mary's School II
2007	Lenana School	Strathmore School I
2008	Moi Forces Academy, Nairobi	Upper Hill School
2009	Dagoretti High School	Sunshine Secondary School
2010	Moi Forces Academy, Nairobi	Rosslyn Academy
2011	Strathmore School I	Sunshine Secondary School
2012	Nairobi School II	Ofafa Jericho High School
2013	Ofafa Jericho High School	New Dawn Educational Centre
2014	Sunshine Secondary School	Makini School
2015	Kiambu High School	Aquinas High School
2016	Eutychus Academy	Thika High School
2017		
2018	Dagoretti High School	Thika High School
2019	Strathmore School	Aquinas High School
2020	Season not Played Due to the COVID-19 pandemic	
2021	Season not Played Due to the COVID-19 pandemic	
2022	All Saints Embu High School	Lenana School
2023	Ofafa Jericho High School II	All Saints Embu High School II
2024	Alliance High School	Strathmore School II
2025	All Saints Embu High School II	Upper Hill School
2026	Dagoretti Mixed Secondary School	Rift Valley Academy II

== Bowl Cup ==
Year	Winner	Runners-up
2000	Njoro Boys High School	Upper Hill School
2001	Lenana School II	Dagoretti High School
2002	Dagoretti High School	Aga Khan Academy
2003	St. Mary's School II	N/A
2004	Strathmore School	Hillcrest Secondary School
2005	Njoro Boys High School	Makongeni Secondary School
2006	Upper Hill School I	Upper Hill School II
2007	Nairobi School II	Ofafa Jericho High School
2008	Makongeni Secondary School	Lenana School II
2009	Rosslyn Academy	Muhuri Muchiri Secondary School
2010	St. Christopher's School	Upper Hill School II
2011	Jamhuri High School	Alliance Boys' High School
2012	Sunshine Secondary School	Moi Forces Academy, Nairobi
2013	Rift Valley Academy II	The Uhuru Secondary School
2014	Dagoretti High School	Aquinas High School
2015	St. Aloysious Gonzaga Secondary School	Dagoretti High School
2016	Dagoretti High School	Strathmore School II
2017		
2018	Lenana School	St. Mary's School
2019	Jamhuri High School	Mutuini High School
2020	Season not Played Due to the COVID-19 pandemic	
2021	Season not Played Due to the COVID-19 pandemic	
2022	Rift Valley Academy II	St. Mary's School II
2023	Upper Hill School	Rift Valley Academy II
2024	Rift Valley Academy II	St. Mary's School
2025	Nairobi School	Rift Valley Academy II
2026	Hospital Hill High School	St. Mary's School

== Women's Competition ==
In 2025, a women's competition was held officially for the first time in the seven-a-side format of the game. Rift Valley Academy were the inaugural winners beating Karen C Secondary School 28 - 07 in the finals.

=== Main Cup ===
Year	Winner	Runners-up	MVP	School
2025	Rift Valley Academy	Karen C Secondary School	Vivian Dilwarth	Rift Valley Academy
2026	Mbagathi Girl's School I	Mbagathi Girl's School II		Mbagathi Girl's School I

=== Plate Cup ===
Year	Winner	Runners-up
2025	Rosslyn Academy	Dagoretti Mixed Secondary School
2026	Karen C Girl's School	Rift Valley Academy

=== Bowl Cup ===
Year	Winner	Runners-up
2025	St. Claire Nembu Girls High School	Kibera Secondary School
2026		
