= List of Prescott Cup Winners =

This is a list of previous winners of the Prescott Cup which was established in 1967.

Year	Winner	Runner's Up	MVP	
1967-1981			N/A	
1982	Lenana School		N/A	
1983	Rift Valley Academy		N/A	
1984	Rift Valley Academy		N/A	
1985	Rift Valley Academy		N/A	
1986	Rift Valley Academy	Lenana School	N/A	
1987	Rift Valley Academy	Nairobi School	N/A	
1988	Rift Valley Academy		N/A	
1989	Rift Valley Academy	Nairobi School	N/A	
1990	Rift Valley Academy	Lenana School	N/A	
1991	St. Mary's School	Rift Valley Academy	N/A	
1992	St. Mary's School	Rift Valley Academy	N/A	
1993	Lenana School	Rift Valley Academy	N/A	
1994	Rift Valley Academy	St. Mary's School	N/A	
1995	St. Mary's School	Rift Valley Academy	N/A	
1996	St. Mary's School	Hillcrest School	N/A	
1997	St. Mary's School	Lenana School	N/A	
1998	St. Mary's School	Rift Valley Academy	N/A	
1999	St. Mary's School	Lenana School	N/A	
2000	Lenana School		N/A	
2001	Lenana School	Nairobi School	N/A	
2002	Nairobi School	Lenana School	N/A	
2003	Alliance High School	Lenana School	N/A	
2004	St. Mary's School	Nairobi School	N/A	
2005	St. Mary's School	Mang'u High School	N/A	
2006	Mang'u High School	Alliance High School	N/A	
2007	Nairobi School	Mang'u High School	N/A	
2008			N/A	
2009			N/A	
2010	Mang'u High School	St. Mary's School	N/A	
2011	Mang'u High School	St. Mary's School	N/A	
2012	Mang'u High School	Upper Hill School	N/A	
2013	Alliance High School	Rift Valley Academy	N/A	
2014	Laiser Hill Academy	Lenana School	N/A	
2015	Alliance High School	Upper Hill School	N/A	
2016	Upper Hill School	Lenana School	Johnstone Olindi	Upper Hill School
2017	Upper Hill School	Rift Valley Academy	Jonnah Volstenk	Rift Valley Academy
2018	Upper Hill School	Rift Valley Academy	Micah Smith	Rift Valley Academy
2019	Upper Hill School	Dagoretti High School		
2020	Season not Played Due to the COVID-19 pandemic			
2021	Season not Played Due to the COVID-19 pandemic			
2022	Ofafa Jericho High School	Rift Valley Academy		
2023	Season not Played Due to the National Exams			
2024	Upper Hill School	Rift Valley Academy		
2025	Kisii School	St. Patrick's Iten		
