= List of things named after Daniel arap Moi =

This is a list of institutions and other entities in Kenya named after former president Daniel arap Moi (1924–2020).

== Airports ==
- Moi Air Base, Nairobi
- Moi International Airport, Mombasa

== Hospitals ==
- Moi Teaching and Referral Hospital

== Sports ==
- Moi International Sports Centre, Kasarani, Nairobi
- Moi Stadium, Kisumu
- Nyayo National Stadium, Nairobi

== Roads and streets ==
- Moi Avenue, Mombasa
- Moi Avenue, Nairobi
- Moi Road, Githunguri

== Education ==
- Moi University, Eldoret
- Moi High School-Mbiruri, Embu
- Moi High School Kabarak, Nakuru
- Moi Girl's High School, Eldoret
- Moi Forces Academy, Nairobi
- Moi Forces Academy, Lanet
- Moi Forces Academy, Mombasa
- Moi Girl's High School, Isinya, Kajiado
- Moi Sirgoi High School, Mosoriot
- Moi Girls' High School, Nangili
- Moi Girls' High School, Kapsabet
- Moi Girls' High School, Kibwezi
- Moi Girls, Kamangu
- Moi Girl's High School, Nairobi
- Moi High School-kasighau, Taita Taveta
- Moi Equator Girls Secondary School, Nanyuki
- Moi Siongiroi Girls High School, Bomet
- Moi Girls High School, Marsabit.
- Arap Moi Primary School, Nkoroi, Kajiado
- Moi Girl's High School, Kamusinga, Bungoma
- Moi Girls Vokoli, Wodonga- Vihiga
- Moi High School, Kaplamai, Trans Nzoia
- Moi Girl's National School, Kapsowar, Elgeyo Marakwet
- Moi High School, Kabartonjo

== Other ==
- Moi Barracks, Eldoret
