= Kevin Mwachiro =

Kenyan human rights activist

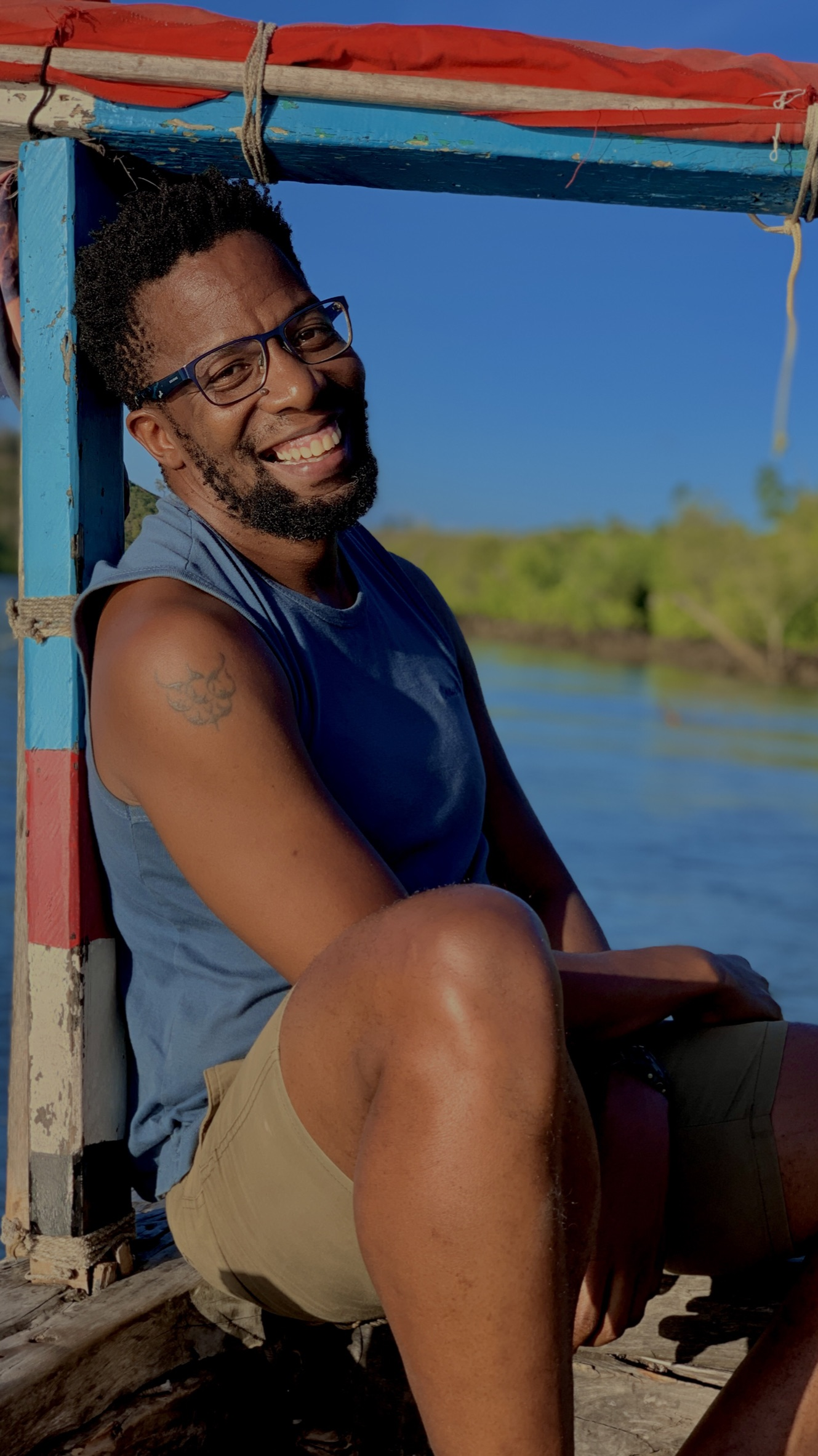
- Born: 8 March 1973 (age 53); Nairobi
- Citizenship: Kenyan
- Education: Daystar University, Nairobi and Bournemouth University, UK.
- Occupations: LGBT Activist, Journalist, Podcaster, Author

Kevin Mwachiro (born 8 March 1973) is a Kenyan LGBTQI+ activist, writer, podcaster, ex-BBC journalist and has been a cancer advocate having been diagnosed with the blood cancer, Multiple Myeloma in October 2015.

== Education ==
He attended Consolata Primary School and Saint Mary's School then Daystar University all in Nairobi Kenya. He also holds a Masters degree in Radio Production from Bournemouth University in the United Kingdom.

== Career ==
He has served on the board of various international non governmental organisations, including Amnesty International and currently serves on the board of the African Book Festival, Berlin.

He is the author of the book "Invisible", a book that explores the reality of being LGBTQI in Kenya. He was the editorial lead for the book, We've Been Here, which was published in 2023. The book is a collection of stories from LGBTQI Kenyans who are 50 years and older.

In October 2017, he founded and is the editor of a story-telling podcast called, Nipe Story, which loosely means tell me a story. The podcast produces audio versions of short story African fiction.

Kevin has over 25 years experience in journalism and communications under his belt.

== Bibliography ==
- Nairobi Noir (Akashic Noir)
- Invisible: Stories From Kenya's Queer Community (2014)
- Boldly Queer: African Perspectives on Same-Sex Sexuality and Gender Diversity (2015)
- We've Been Here (2023)
