= Blackrock Rugby Festival =

Rugby union competition in Kenya

- Sport: Rugby union
- Instituted: 1983
- Number of teams: 24
- Country: Kenya
- Holders: Rift Valley Academy (14th title)
- Most titles: Rift Valley Academy (14 titles)
- Qualification: Registration
- Related competitions: Prescott Cup

The Blackrock Rugby Festival (also known as the St. Mary's Blackrock Festival or simply Blackrock), is an annual school's rugby union competition held at St. Mary's School in Nairobi, Kenya, usually around May and June. It is the biggest high school tournament in East Africa. The first tournament took place in 1983, and also featured a club rugby competition. The tournament is used by Kenyan rugby clubs to scout for new and upcoming players. It is an under-19 age group tournament.

St. Mary's School was founded in 1939 and, for many years, was run by the Holy Ghost Fathers of Blackrock College in Ireland, hence the name of the tournament. The school uses the same badge as Blackrock College and their rugby team also wear the same blue and white hoops as their sister institution. A further reminder of the strong Irish influence on the school is the former name of their playing fields where the tournament takes place, Lansdowne Road (named after the Irish national rugby stadium in Dublin).

The Blackrock Festival is a key event where future rugby stars in Kenya are identified, nurtured, and given the platform to shine. The Most Valuable Players from this festival have gone on to achieve great things in the game. For instance, Allan Hicks, who was 19 when he played for Kenya at the Rugby World Cup Sevens in 2001, Innocent Simiyu, who captained both Kenya's 15s and Sevens teams, and went on to serve as Head Coach twice for Kenya Simbas. Other notable M.V.P.'s include Ugandan International Philip Wokorach and former Kenya Simbas Head Coach, Paul Odera.

In the 2026 edition, an International Schools Select Squad participated in the tournament for a first and they managed to reach the final in which they faced off with a strong Rift Valley Academy side who defeated them 17:3.

== Competition ==
The tournament is played in a round-robin format, normally with 24 teams divided into 8 groups of 3 teams each.

The top team of each group qualifies for the quarter-finals of the Main Cup, while the second and third-placed team of each group qualify for the quarter-finals of the Plate and Bowl Cup respectively.

In 2025, a women's tournament was introduced, played in a seven-a-side format. Rift Valley Academy won the inaugural tournament beating Karen C Secondary School 28 - 07 in the final.

In 2022, the competition was played in a seven-a-side format instead of the regular fifteen-a-side format while in 2023 and 2024, the competition was played in a ten-a-side format. In 2025 and in future, they are reverting back to the traditional 15s rugby.

=== Knockout stage ===
Teams in each group advance to the Main Cup, Plate and Bowl Cup as shown below.

Quarter-finals
Saints Pitch A
Pool A
Pool H
Saints Pitch B
Pool D
Pool E
Saints Pitch C
Pool B
Pool G
Saints Pitch E
Pool C
Pool F

Semi-finals
Saints Pitch B
Quarter-final Winner 1
Quarter-final Winner 2
Saints Pitch C
Quarter-final Winner 3
Quarter-final Winner 4

Final
Saints Pitch A
Semi-final Winner 1
Semi-final Winner 2

== Public influence ==
Entrance for spectators was free until 2012, when tickets began to be produced and sold for KSh.200/=, and later KSh.100/=. This was in response to several security concerns that arose in the past few tournaments, especially thefts and disturbing the peace.

The tournament usually attracts crowds of about 2,000 people each year.
