= Keith McAdam =

Personal information
- Full name: Keith Paul William James McAdam
- Born: 13 August 1945 (age 81); Edinburgh, Midlothian, Scotland
- Batting: Left-handed
- Bowling: Right-arm (unknown style)

Domestic team information
- Years: Team
- 1967: Marylebone Cricket Club
- 1966–1969: Buckinghamshire
- 1965–1966: Cambridge University

Career statistics
Competition	First-class	List A
Matches	21	1
Runs scored	815	1
Batting average	20.89	1.00
100s/50s	–/3	–/–
Top score	63	1
Balls bowled	12	–
Wickets	–	–
Bowling average	–	–
5 wickets in innings	–	–
10 wickets in match	–	–
Best bowling	–	–
Catches/stumpings	10/–	–/–
- Source: Cricinfo, 7 May 2011

Keith Paul William James McAdam DL (born 13 August 1945) is a former Scottish cricketer and a specialist in tropical diseases.

== Cricket career ==
McAdam was a left-handed batsman. He was born in Edinburgh.

McAdam made his first-class debut for Cambridge University against Surrey in 1964. He played 19 further first-class matches for the university, the last coming against Oxford University in 1966. In his 20 first-class matches for the university, he scored 752 runs at a batting average of 19.78, with two half centuries and a highest score of 59. In 1967, he played a single first-class match for the Marylebone Cricket Club at Lord's, making his highest first-class score in the MCC first innings, scoring 63 before being dismissed by Stephen Russell.

McAdam made his debut for Buckinghamshire in the 1966 Minor Counties Championship against Berkshire. He played seven Minor Counties Championship matches for Buckinghamshire between 1966 and 1968. He made his only List A appearance for Buckinghamshire against Middlesex in the 1969 Gillette Cup, scoring one run before being dismissed by John Price.

== Education and medical career ==
McAdam grew up in Uganda, where his father, Sir Ian McAdam, was Professor of Surgery at Makerere University. He attended Prince of Wales School in Nairobi, Millfield School in England, and Clare College, Cambridge, where he studied medicine.

He became an eminent physician, specialising in tropical diseases. He is the founding director of the Infectious Diseases Institute in Kampala, the associate international director at the Royal College of Physicians in London, and is on the International Board of the African Medical and Research Foundation.

He is the founder of the charity "Music for my Mind", which uses music to help dementia patients and a Deputy Lieutenant of Hertfordshire.
