= John Sibi-Okumu =

Kenyan actor and journalist

- Born: 1954 (age 71–72); Budalangi
- Education: University of Toulouse II – Le Mirail, France
- Occupations: actor, journalist
- Notable work: Shake Hands with the Devil

John Sibi-Okumu is a Kenyan actor and journalist, best known internationally for his role in The Constant Gardener.

== Biography ==
John Sibi-Okumu was born in 1954 in the Western part Kenya at a place called Budalangi . He received his formal education first in the United Kingdom at William Patten School, London, later in Kenya at Muthaiga Primary School and for his secondary education, he joined Duke of York which was later renamed; Lenana School, then later on University of Toulouse II – Le Mirail, France. For most of his professional life he taught French at elementary, middle and high school levels, being Head of Modern Languages' Departments at various stages in a long career. Sibi-Okumu started acting in 1968 while a student at Lenana School, proceeding to act in various theatre productions.

As a journalist, he hosted a popular TV program, Summit aired on Kenya Television Network (KTN), in which he interviewed Kenyan politicians. Over the years, he has been recognizable, especially to Kenyan listeners and viewers alike, as a radio and television newsreader and presenter. For example, between 1997 and 2002 on The Summit, conducting incisive, one-on-one TV interviews with such personalities as Daniel arap Moi, Mwai Kibaki, Robert Mugabe, Ellen Johnson-Sirleaf, Richard Leakey and Wangari Maathai. Starting in 2007, he was quizmaster for a half-hour, inter-university, general knowledge show, Celtel Africa Challenge (later Zain Africa Challenge). The show, which aired in English-speaking nations across Africa and via direct broadcast satellite on DStv, featured university teams from eight African nations. The show concluded its broadcast run in 2010.

He has narrated award-winning documentaries in both English and French and also acted in several film productions, among them as the fictional Minister for Health Dr. Joshua Ngaba in the Oscar-winning The Constant Gardener and as the real life UN diplomat Jacques Roger Boh-Boh in Shake Hands with the Devil, the story of the Rwanda genocide through the eyes of French-Canadian general Roméo Dallaire. His other movie credits include Born Free (1975), We are the children (1987) and Metamo (1997). Over the years, Sibi-Okumu has appeared in some 40 lead roles on stage, including Sophocles' King Oedipus; Shakespeare's Romeo, Oberon and Shylock; Anouilh's Creon in Antigone, Samuel Beckett's Vladimir in Waiting for Godot and Mtwa/Ngema's Percy in Woza, Albert! Sibi-Okumu himself has devised In Search of the Drum Major and Like Ripples On a Pond, both on the American Civil Rights Movement, as well as Milestones - A showcase for African Poetry.

He has written two plays. The first, Role Play – A Journey Into The Kenyan Psyche, was published in 2005 (MvuleAfrica Publishers; ISBN 9966-769-42-0) and hailed by Newsweek International as "an unapologetic look at racial stereotypes in modern Kenya". The second, Minister…Karibu!, was seen by Nairobi audiences in October 2007. In Minister…Karibu! Sibi-Okumu satirises (somewhat prophetically for Kenya) the risks of selfish politics to social stability. He has since added Tom Mboya: Master of Mass Management, for young readers, to his published literary oeuvre (Sasa Sema/Longhorn Publishers).

In October 2009 John Sibi-Okumu [5] directed the musical Mo Faya, shown at the 2009 New York Musical Theatre Festival.

As a print journalist he has written for Kenyan newspapers and magazines under the pseudonym Mwenye Sikio and, for three years was on the editorial board of the quarterly journal AWAAZ - Voices of the South Asian Diaspora ([www.awaazmagazine.com]), for which he continues to write a regular column: "Alternative Angle". To add a further, word-driven string to his bow, he has taken on assignments as an editor, most frequently of scientific research journals. Throughout his adult life, Sibi-Okumu has welcomed opportunities for lending his talents benevolently to charitable and social welfare causes.

In 2002, he was given the honorific title of Chevalier (Knight) in the Ordre des Palmes Académiques, for services to French culture in Kenya. Apart from his achievements as a teacher, he has a considerable reputation as a Man of the Arts. Alluding to his accomplishments as a teacher and educator, he is endearingly referred to with the Swahili honorific Mwalimu ("teacher") in Kenyan society.

== Filmography ==
Year	Title	Role	Notes
2005	The Constant Gardener	Dr. Joshua Ngaba	
2007	Shake Hands with the Devil	Booh-Booh	
2010	The First Grader	Chairman of Education	
