= Nilesh Samani =

British cardiologist

Sir Nilesh Jayantilal Samani, DL, FRCP, FMedSci (born 19 July 1956) is a British physician who is Professor of Cardiology at the University of Leicester, and a consultant cardiologist at Glenfield Hospital, Leicester. He was medical director of the British Heart Foundation from 2016 to 2023.

== Life and career ==
Samani is of ethnic Indian origin and was born in Nanyuki, Kenya. His mother tongue is Gujarati. He was educated at the Lenana School in Nairobi, and once his family moved to the UK in 1971, at Charles Keene College in Leicester. He then studied at the University of Leicester, where he obtained a First Class Honours BSc degree in medical sciences in 1978. followed by an MBChB medical degree with distinction in 1981. Serving as a house officer from 1981 and then as a senior house officer from 1982 to 1985, Samani then became an MRC Clinical Trainee Fellow until 1988. From that point, he served as a lecturer in medicine, then senior lecturer from 1993 onwards co-terminous with his appointment as a consultant at Glenfield until his elevation to Professor in 1997.

Samani achieved his MD degree with distinction and Fellowship of the Royal College of Physicians (FRCP) both in 1994, and of the Academy of Medical Sciences (FMedSci) in 2002. Since 2010 he has served as a Deputy Lieutenant (DL) of Leicestershire. He was knighted in the 2015 New Year Honours for "services to Medicine and Medical Research".

In February 2023, the British Heart Foundation announced that Samani would step down as medical director of the charity later in the year, after more than 7 years in the post.

== Personal life ==
He is married with two sons.
