= Joint Admissions Board of Kenya =

Joint Admission Board of Kenya (JAB) was the body that was mandated to conduct a joint admission exercise of students who have cleared secondary school into the Universities. The main aim was to ensure that only those who have attained a certain number of points are given priority to join the universities under a government sponsorship. The admission exercise was done annually at the beginning of every academic year and students who sat their Kenya Certificate of Secondary Education (K.C.S.E.) the previous year are the ones considered.

== Cluster points ==
The board usually meets after the release of K.C.S.E to determine the cut-off points to join public universities. At the beginning the cut-off point was C+ which has now risen to a mean grade of B due to the increasing number of candidates who sit for K.C.S.E.

== Structure ==
It was composed of representatives from all public universities and the Ministry of education. It was headed by a chairman who chosen from among them. Furthermore, there were three levels of authority at JAB;

== Top level ==
The top level was a committee of vice-chancellors and the Ministry of Education representatives. The vice-chancellors ensured that all policies and procedures were adhered to and dealt with special admissions cases while the Ministry of Education participated to ensure that national policies are factored in whenever JAB was making decisions.

== Second level ==
The second level was composed of deans, director of faculties, schools, and various institutes in the respective universities. They received the output of the JAB system and they in turn received the students into their various schools, institutes or faculties. The deans can also make recommendations on policies and matters that pertain the admission processes.

== Third Level ==
The third level was a combination of ICT technical staff and the bureaucrats who were collectively referred to as the JAB secretariat. Their main role was to maintain the JAB and administer the JAB process. The following universities and affiliated colleges were represented in JAB

1. University of Nairobi
2. Kenyatta University
3. Egerton University
4. Moi University
5. Maseno University
6. Jomo Kenyatta University Of Agriculture & Technology Official Website
7. Masinde Muliro University of Science and Technology
8. Dedan Kimathi University of Technology
9. Chuka University
10. Technical University of Kenya
11. Technical University of Mombasa
12. Pwani University
13. Kisii University
14. University of Eldoret
15. Laikipia University
16. Masai Mara University
17. Meru University of Science and Technology
18. South Eastern Kenya University
19. Jaramongi Odinga University of Science and Technology
20. University of Kabianga
21. Multimedia University of Kenya
22. Karatina University
23. Kibabii University
