= Strathmore School =

Coordinates: 1°16′10″S 36°46′36″E

- Lavington, Nairobi; Kenya

Information
- Type: Private, all-male, day school
- Motto: UT OMNES UNUM SINT (That All May Be One)
- Religious affiliation: Roman Catholic
- Patron saint: Saint Josemaría Escrivá
- Established: 1961
- Principal: John Muthiora
- Classes: Std 1-8; Form 1–4
- Education system: 8-4-4 / Kenyan system
- Colors: Cream, grey, black
- Rival: St. Mary's School
- Affiliation: Opus Dei
- Website: www.strathmore.ac.ke

Strathmore School is Kenya's first multi-racial school, established in 1961 in the Lavington area of Nairobi. It began as a residential Sixth Form College offering British-styled A-level courses and in 1963 switched from the Cambridge School Certificate Examination to the London GCE. In 1977 it became a full-fledged Secondary school. In 1988, the school began offering education under the KCSE - Kenya Certificate of Secondary Education - curricula which it follows to date. The first batch of primary school students (6-7 year olds) entered in 1987. It no longer has any boarders.

== School honours ==
Every year the school honours two outstanding students graduating. One being the Sportsman of the Year, and the other the Scholar of the Year. Those who are honoured have their names engraved on an 'Honours Board' at the school. There is also an Honours Board for the Primary School Scholar of the Year.

Since 1961, only two people have been awarded both Honours, James McFie in 1963 and Andrew Lumumba in 2012.

Every year the top three [in primary] and top five [in secondary] all-rounded students in each class are awarded the school pennant. The school does not award any colours to students.

== Sports teams ==
The rugby team is known as The Bandits. In 2008 they were the winners of the St. Mary's Blackrock Festival, the biggest schools rugby festival in Kenya. However, they were beaten by their rivals Saints, the eventual winners in the finals of the 2010 edition of the festival. They wear striped shirts of black, blue and white.

Other teams include the Pirates (basketball), the Stallions, who renamed themselves the Falcons in 2016 (volleyball), who won the Nairobi provincial league several times in the 1970s, the Stalwarts (cricket) and the Sharks (swimming).

The doctrinal and religious formation in Strathmore is entrusted to Opus Dei, a prelature of the Catholic Church.

Strathmore School consistently ranks as one of the top private schools in the KCSE and was ranked the second best high school (nationwide) based on 2006 Kenya Certificate of Secondary Education and the second best private high school in 2013 Kenya Certificate of Secondary Education.

== Notable alumni ==
- Dan 'chizi' Aceda, Musician
- Daniel Adongo, American football player
- Christopher Kirubi, businessman and owner of Two Rivers mall, Nairobi, Kenya
- Henry Kosgey, former member of parliament for Tinderet Constituency and Minister for Industrialization
- George Magoha, former head of the Ministry of Education
- Patrick Makau, politician
- Mbithi Masya, Film Producer
- David Mathenge aka Nameless (musician)
- Gideon Moi, politician
- Anthony Muheria, Archbishop of Roman Catholic Archdiocese of Nyeri
- Willy Mutunga, 13th Chief Justice of Kenya
- John-Allan Namu, reporter
- Patrick Njoroge, 9th governor of Central Bank of Kenya
- Chris Okemo, 8th Minister for Finance of Kenya
- Dalmas Otieno, politician.
- Michael Kijana Wamalwa, 8th Vice President of Kenya
