= Erica Mann =

Austrian-born urban planner, active in Kenya

- Born: Erika Schoenbaum; August 23, 1917; Vienna, Austria-Hungary
- Died: 4 June 2007 (aged 89)
- Education: École des Beaux Arts
- Occupations: Urban planner, architect
- Known for: City planning in Kenya; Women in Kibwezi initiative
- Spouse: Igor Mann
- Children: Kenny Mann, Rhodia Mann

Erica Mann (née Erika Schoenbaum; 1917 – 2007) was an architect and town planner who lived and worked in Kenya for almost all her adult life, after fleeing her home in Romania during the Second World War. She made a significant contribution to the 1948 master plan for Nairobi and also took a leading role in planning Mombasa and other parts of Kenya. She became interested in development projects seeking to improve living standards and was director of the "Women in Kibwezi" project, which was recognised at the United Nations Habitat II conference in 1996. The "Woman in Kibwezi" project was but one of several NGOs she headed across Kenya, many of them engaged in fostering women's cooperatives. In 2003 she was honoured with the title of Architect Laureate for Kenya.

== Personal life ==
She was born Erika Schoenbaum in Vienna in 1917 and grew up in Romania where she went to school in Bucharest before studying architecture at the École des Beaux Arts in Paris. She married her husband Igor Mann a few weeks after meeting him and falling in love. He was a Polish veterinarian who had had to leave his homeland when it was invaded by Nazi Germany. In late 1940 the Manns, who were both secular Jews, escaped across the Danube to safety, travelling east and south via Palestine and Egypt before spending some months in a British-run refugee camp in Northern Rhodesia. In 1942 they moved to Kenya, then under British rule, and made their lives there. They became British citizens in 1948, although Mann did not always feel welcomed by the British expatriate community in Kenya. She and her husband became known for hosting "open house" afternoons where they welcomed guests of all ethnicities: colleagues, artists, politicians and other people from the "intelligentsia". They had three children.

== Career ==
Not long after she settled in Kenya, the colonial administration set up a town planning department in Nairobi. Mann applied to join it and worked on the 1948 master plan for the city. Although some aspects of the original plan still exist, like the suburbs of Jericho and Ofafa designed by Mann, she said in the 1990s that Nairobi was not the city she and her colleagues had planned, although she did plan some of the broad boulevards.

She was soon recognised as a talented and committed urban planner and became the senior planning and development officer for many major projects, in charge of researching and evidence gathering for strategic planning decisions. She was attracted by the ideas of the "Ekistics" movement which encouraged a holistic approach to planning harmonious human settlements. Mann was interested in traditional African house designs, repudiating any idea that they were "primitive", and wrote and lectured on the subject. She saw urban planning as "an ideal profession for a woman because it builds on her innate capacity for providing an orderly and aesthetic environment for herself, her family and the community in which she lives".

She kept in touch with the ideas of architects and thinkers across the world and promoted the work of "ecological" and innovative architects in the magazines she founded: Build Kenya and Plan East Africa. In 1952 she started planning work on the city of Mombasa and Coastal Province. In 1962 she moved on to Central Province for another ten years, and then to North-Eastern Province.

After Kenyan independence in 1963 Mann was one of the Europeans who continued to serve under the new government. She supported independence and was happy to work under President Kenyatta who believed in continuity and gradual administrative change. She went to many international conferences and lectures as a representative of postcolonial Kenya, and between 1964 and 1968 she was intermittently seconded to take charge of overseas trade exhibitions. Her interests broadened out to include sustainable development and human rights issues and she described herself as a socialist. In 1972 she founded the Council for Human Ecology: Kenya, also known as CHEK, concerned with empowering rural women as well as environmental protection. CHEK became the umbrella for numerous NGO efforts over the years. With CHEK, Mann led the Women in Kibwezi rural development project which offered several thousand women support in building self-sufficiency, including training in apiculture (bee keeping), brickmaking, and rabbit breeding. This was recognised as a valuable and successful project by the United Nations Habitat II conference in 1996. Mann became known for her deep respect for the wisdom and knowledge of the indigenous peoples of Kenya, working for example to preserve the knowledge of healing botanicals held by many traditional healers.

After retiring from government employment in 1984 some of Mann's creativity went into her unique collection of succulent plants from different parts of the African continent, arranged in an artistic and carefully designed garden. It drew international attention from botanists including some from the Royal Botanic Gardens, Kew, London. Erica also accumulated one of the largest private collections of African art anywhere in East Africa.

== Legacy ==
Mann was given the title of Architect Laureate in 2003. Four years later she died, on 4 June 2007, shortly before her 90th birthday. At her memorial service a former chairman of the Architects Association of Kenya, said she was "a lone woman in a forest of men - one reason why she joined the International Union of Women Architects as well as becoming an active member of the Kenya Association of University Women". In a memoir Mann said, "I have generally tried to put both my head and hands to good use, always guided by my heart. From this point of view, I have maintained that I was a complete person in that I have used every gift granted by my Maker." Writing shortly after Mann's death, Betty Caplan, in an obituary titled "A Woman of Substance", described her as "Town planner, architect, ecologist, project manager, conservationist, bee keeper, speaker of seven languages, avid promoter of women's equality, jeweller, potter, craftswoman, gardener, collector."

In 2013, Erica's life in Kenya was memorialized in a documentary film titled Beautiful Tree, Severed Roots. The documentary was directed by Erica's daughter, Kenny. The title of the film is a reference to Erica's maiden name, Schoenbaum, which means "beautiful tree".
