= Nakuru Boys High School =

Public high school in Nakuru, Kenya

Location
- P.O Box 661 - 20100; Nakuru, Nakuru; Kenya; 0°16′39″N 36°5′39″E

Information
- Other names: NHS, Nakuru High School, Naks high
- School type: Public High school National school
- Motto: Learn to Serve
- Opened: 1927; 99 years ago
- Founder: Edward William Macleay Grigg
- Sister school: Nakuru Girls High School
- Principal: John Kuyo
- Gender: Male
- Colors: Green, Blue, White and Grey
- Website: http://nakuruhigh.ac.ke

Nakuru Boys High School is an all-boys high school in Nakuru, Kenya. It is one of the 17 traditional national schools in Kenya that have existed for over 30 years.

== History ==
Nakuru High School is one of Kenya's National Schools located in Nakuru City, off Nakuru-Nyahururu highway. It borders Nakuru State House to the West. The school was founded in 1927 as Francis Scott High School but later renamed to Nakuru High School after Kenya attained independence in 1963. The first stone was laid by the then colonial governor Edward William Macleay Grigg. It has roughly 200 acres of land facing Menengai Crater. Initially the co-educational institution was reserved for children of the whites who lived in the outlying farming areas and British administrators. All teachers, masters (as they were called at the time) were also white. First formed as a boarding school, it still allowed day pupils on condition that they lived around the school.

By the late 1950s, the school had grown to have a swimming pool, numerous rugby pitches, basketball courts, football pitches, hockey and cricket fields. The school also had well equipped learning resources. It has fully furbished classrooms, and science laboratories. Unique was the weather station where geography students took practical lessons. To keep up with its fast pace of growth, a large contingent of residential subordinate staff was employed.

After Kenya's Independence in 1963, gradual changes followed including the school being renamed and the first admissions of children of African origin. The first black students who pioneered entry to the school suffered harsh racial discrimination from students of Asian descent. In 1964 the school was opened to girls, making it the only national co-educational school in the whole country. A few years later, black teachers were employed, and in 1982 the first black principal, Francis Kesui, was appointed to the school.

The school has produced notable leaders, scholars, actors and countless professionals and performs well in National Examinations. Rugby is a signature game for Nakuru High School. Multiple times has it dominated provincial rugby competition but has faced stiff competition at national level lately, despite having bagged the National and East Africa titles in 2004 and 2005 consecutively.

== Two schools in one ==
Before the school was split, it had the largest number of students in the country one stream having seven or eight classes each with students not less than 50 so that each year a class had between 300 and 450 students - a number equivalent to a whole school in most places. By mid-2000 this uncontrolled admission led to leaders calling for its split along gender lines. It was also arguable that despite being mixed, girls had their own classes and dining hall. The aim was to reduce the number to ease management and to subsequently improve academic performance. In 2007 the school was split into the current Nakuru Boys High School and Nakuru Girls High School. Both schools have since recorded noticeable improvement in Kenya Certificate of Secondary Education (KCSE) performance.

== Academics ==
Nakuru High School is categorised as a national school, meaning it recruits students who do well from all over Kenya according to the Kenya Certificate of Primary Education (KCPE). It is the only national school in Kenya with a curriculum that also favours visually impaired students. The school admits several visually impaired students every year and has programs to ensure they blend well with other students. The old education system (O-Level and A-Level System) consisted of first forms to sixth forms but after changes occurred it changed to first to fourth forms. The school offers a wide range of subjects which are all examinable in the final exam (KCSE): Maths, English, Kiswahili, Physics, Chemistry, Biology, Geography, History and Religious Education. These are all mandatory during the first two years. Other examinable subjects are :

The Commercials :

- Business
- German
- French
- Music

The Applied Technicals :

- Woodwork
- Computer Studies
- Metalwork
- Building and Construction
- Drawing and Design
- Art and Design
- Electricity
- Power Mechanics
- Home Science
- Agriculture

The school prides itself as being the only one in Kenya that offers ten technical subjects, the only one unavailable at the moment being Aviation which is offered at Mangu High School

== Clubs and Societies ==
The school has a variety of Clubs and Societies. Some clubs like the Mathematics club, Junior Achievement club and Science club have represented the school at national, continental and international levels. The Mathematics club has produced the country's best mathematicians in the National Brookside Mathematics Contest. The Science club sent two students in 2019 to Ireland to represent the country at the Young Scientists Contest. The music club wins numerous awards nationally in the National Music Festival.

== Disciplinary Issues ==
Nakuru High School, like many other secondary schools in Kenya, has had several disciplinary issues over the years that attracted nation wide attention from the media and education stakeholders. The most recent was a strike and riot by unruly students on 9th Feb 2025 where the students complained of poor diet.
