= Rhodia Mann =

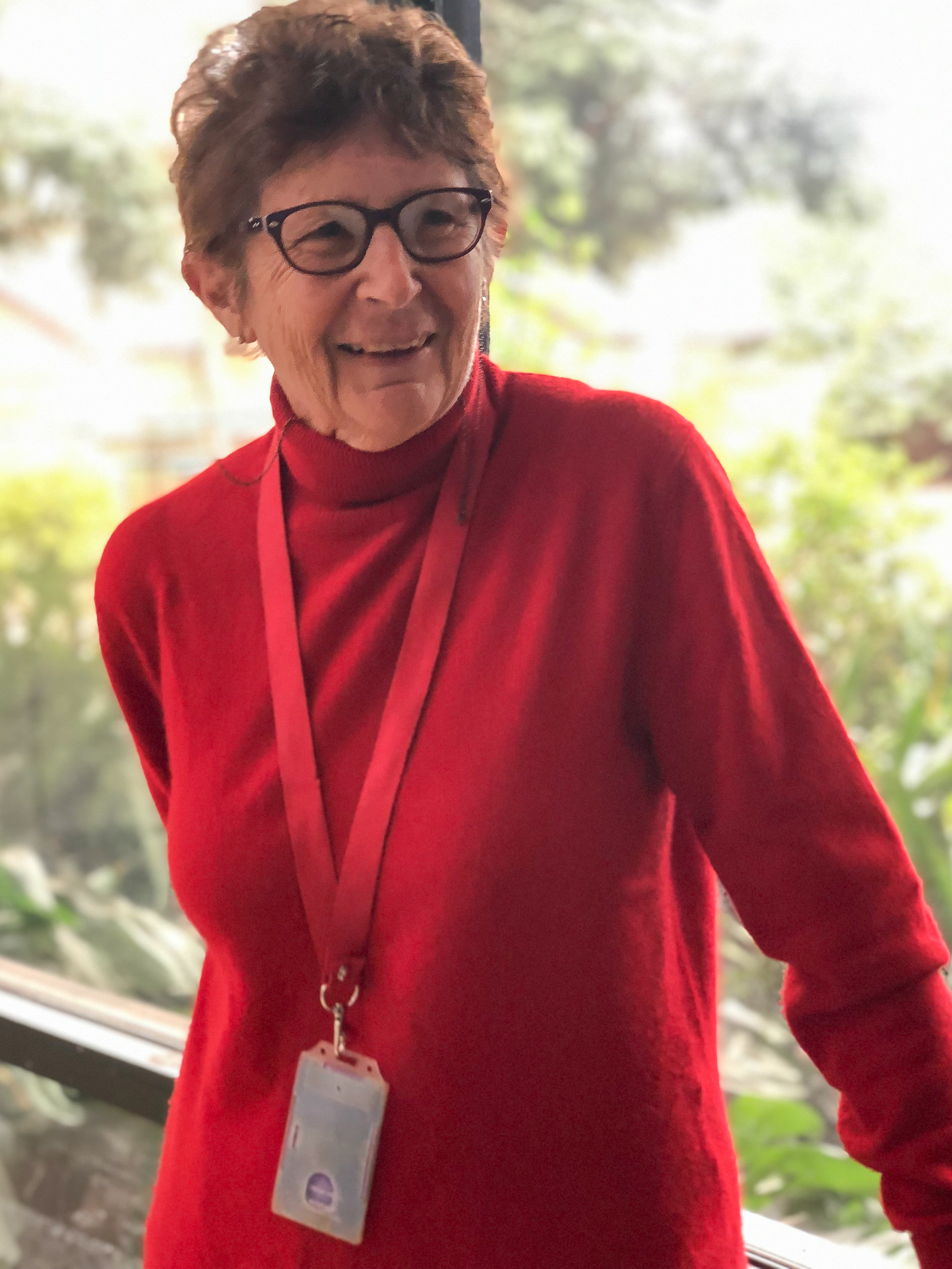
- Photo by Mamen Saura
- Born: 1942; Kenya
- Occupations: Writer, researcher, jewelry designer, ethnographer
- Known for: Studies on Samburu and Borana tribes Founder of Rhodia Mann Museum of Samburu Culture Documentary The Butterfly People
- Notable work: Talk to the Stars, Hawecha, Ushanga, Ice Cream in Sololo
- Children: 2 sons
- Awards: Fellow of the Royal Geographical Society Runner-up, 2009 Jomo Kenyatta Literature Awards

Rhodia Mann (born 1942) is a Kenyan writer, researcher, bead and jewelry designer, and historian of several traditionally-pastoralist tribes in Kenya, including the Samburu and Borana tribes of northern Kenya. She has published six books and is the creator of a documentary, The Butterfly People.

== Early life ==
Mann is Polish-Romanian and was born in Kenya to parents who had fled Europe in the early 1940s as refugees from Nazi-invaded territory. Along with her brother and sister, Mann grew up in Nairobi while her parents worked with the British colonial government of Kenya. Her father, Igor, was a veterinarian and her mother, Erica, was an architect. Her childhood in Nairobi was filled with artists, writers, and intellectuals from all over the world.

When Mann was nine years old, her father took her to visit the Samburu region of Kenya, then called the “Northern Frontier”. This visit inspired her interest in studying the land, life, and culture of the people who live there.

When she was 16, Mann had a dream in which she returned to the Samburu region. After high school, she studied fashion design in London and later, business studies. She then moved to Manhattan, New York City. As she continued to travel the world, Mann's fascination with Kenyan history and culture merged with her interest in fashion, textiles, jewelry, and beads. When she was 30, Mann made her adolescent dream a reality and went back to Samburu.

== Life and career ==
After many years of traveling to Samburu, Mann forged a close bond with a Samburu family north of Maralal. The matriarch of the family, named Ntaipi, officially “adopted” Mann. She was given the name “Noongishu”, which translates literally as “cattle”, but signifies a respected and independent woman within the community. Mann eventually started her own safari company in the region, which specialized in taking tourists on vigorous camping expeditions in northern Kenya.

During many years spent among the Samburu people studying their lifestyle and culture, Mann began documenting what she saw. She is the author of six books and the producer of a documentary, The Butterfly People. Each of these publications provides insights into the vibrant Samburu culture and their relationship with the Maasai tribe. Through her writing, Mann demystifies cultural ceremonies, addresses the generational stratification of Samburu family structure, and helps readers understand the spiritual importance of the stars. Mann was elected a Fellow of the Royal Geographical Society in recognition of her devotion to research.

In 2018, Mann donated her extensive 50-year collection of rare and historic Samburu artifacts to the International School of Kenya, where the Rhodia Mann Museum of Samburu Culture now exists. This permanent display is dedicated to educating students on the history of Samburu. It includes authentic traditional artifacts, ceremonial beads, warriors’ spears, and other articles essential to understanding the Samburu culture. The exhibit also includes maps, original photographs, and copies of Mann's published books.

Mann is an accomplished jewelry designer and bead collector. In 2003 she curated an exhibition on beads at the National Museum of Kenya. The beads that have been adorning the Samburu people for many generations inspired many of Mann’s bead endeavors, and these artistic pieces remain one of her passions today.

== Personal life ==
Mann was once married, but later divorced. She has two sons, both of whom live in New York City. Mann lives on the outskirts of Nairobi.

== Publications ==
=== Ethnographies ===
- Talk to the Stars: The Samburu of Northern Kenya
- Hawecha: A Woman For All Time - A historical novel based on Borana culture, runner-up 2009 Jomo Kenyatta Literature Awards
- Ushanga: The Story of Beads in Africa
- Safari to the Stars

=== Memoirs ===
- Ice Cream in Sololo: Journeys to the Heart of Life - Follows Rhodia’s life’s journey and tells the story of the Samburu as it was shared with her
- A Woman of Two Worlds: How (not) to Become an Anthropologist

=== Documentary ===
- The Butterfly People: The Samburu of Northern Kenya - The film begins with Rhodia’s personal involvement with the Samburu family who adopted her, and is set against a background of magnificent scenery. Through the life story of her Samburu ‘mother’, Rhodia blends historical fact with folklore to give a history of Samburu, as far as it is known. The story takes us from the past into the present, and ultimately to the circumcision ceremonies of 2005.
