= Kijabe =

Town in Kenya

Coordinates: 0°56.7′S 36°35.7′E

Kijabe is a town in Kenya.

== Etymology ==
The name Kijabe likely derives from the Maasai 'Donyo Kejabe' meaning 'place of the wind'.

== Description ==
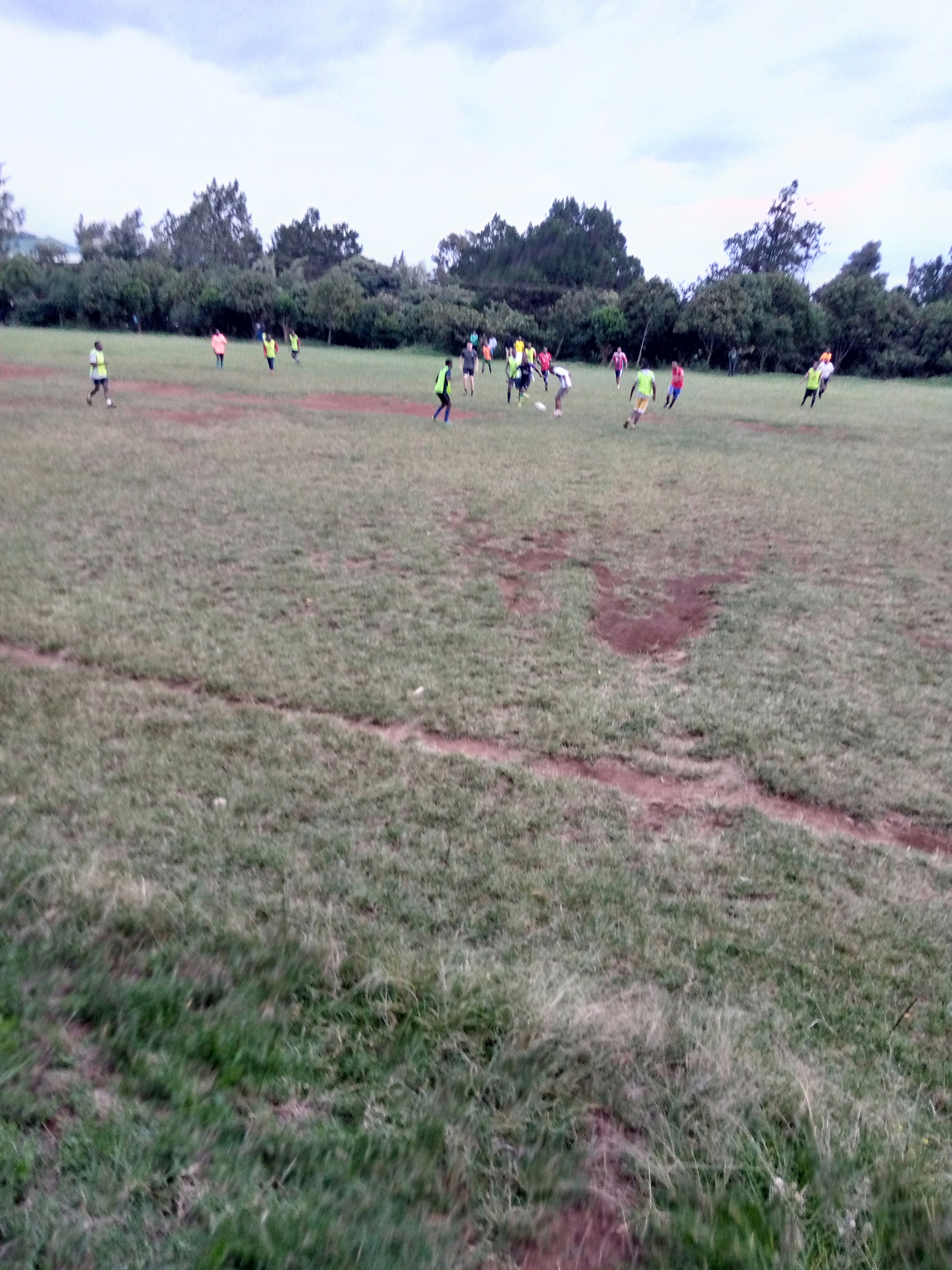
Young people playing soccer.

It stands on the edge of the Great Rift Valley at an altitude of 2200m, some 50 kilometres north-west of Nairobi. Kijabe is located in the sub-county of Lari, Kiambu County. Kijabe had a population of 2,026 people in 2019. Kijabe has a railway station along the Uganda Railway. The town is located between Limuru and Naivasha.

There are actually two places called Kijabe. Kijabe Town is located approximately 2 km north-west of Kijabe Mission Station. Kijabe Town is the closest settlement to the Railway Station of the same name and is a community of small land holders. Kijabe mission station is the home of Kijabe Hospital, AIC-CURE International Children's Hospital of Kenya, Moffatt Bible College, Kijabe Youth Charity initiative, a group that helps the less privileged in the society, and Rift Valley Academy, a school for children of missionaries, expats, and Kenyan Nationals established in 1906 and Kijabe Guesthouse.

== History ==
Kijabe is a town in the lands of the Maasai people. During British colonial times, it served a mission station. However in recent times, it has been turned into a medical community.

On April 29, 2024, at least 50, possibly up to 315 people died in the village of Kamuchiri of Mai Mahiu town in a flood caused by the collapse of the old Kijabe Dam, an old railway dam of the Uganda Railway. It was initially reported that the flood was caused by a dam break. The flood was triggered by a blockage in a culvert under the embankment, which led to a catastrophic dam failure and flooding.
