= Kenya National Examinations Council =

Examinations body of Kenya

Kenya National Examinations Council (KNEC) is the national body responsible for overseeing national examinations in Kenya. The council was formed in 1980 to conduct school, post-school and other examinations, after the dissolution of the East African Examinations Council (EAEC) and the Ministry of Education (ME). The KNEC was established under the Kenya National Examinations Council Act Cap 225A of the laws of Kenya, which was repealed and replaced with KNEC Act No.29 of 2012.

The KNEC is responsible for conducting the national examinations of KPSEA , KCPE and KCSE, and for the management and development of education certification in Kenya.

== Role and functions ==
After the dissolution of EAEC and the ME, the Kenya National Examinations Council took the roles of ensuring validity and reliability of examinations; and conformity to Kenya's goals and changes in government policy relating to the curriculum and examination.

The functions of the Kenya National Examinations Council are to:

- Set and maintain examination standards, conduct public academic, technical and other national examinations within Kenya at basic and tertiary levels;
- Award certificates or diplomas to candidates in such examinations;
- Confirm authenticity of certificates or diplomas issued by the Council upon request by the government, public institutions, learning institutions, employers and other interested parties;
- Issue replacement certificates or diplomas to candidates or diplomas to candidates in such examinations upon acceptable proof of loss of the original;
- Undertake research on educational assessment;
- Promote the international recognition of qualifications conferred by the Council.
