= Edward Rombo =

Kenyan rugby footballer

- Born: 19 March 1967 (age 59) Nairobi, Kenya
- School: Nairobi School
- University: University of Nairobi, Leeds University

Rugby union career
- Position: Winger
Amateur team(s)
Years	Team	Apps	(Points)
1987	Barclays RFC		
1987–90	Mean Machine RFC		
1999–03	Mwamba RFC		
International career
Years	Team	Apps	(Points)
- Kenya
1987–90	KRFU Chairman's XV		
–	Watembezi Pacesetters VII		
–	Scorpions RFC		
Coaching career
- Years: Team
- 2010–: Mwamba RFC
- Rugby league career

Playing information
- Position: Wing
Club
Years	Team	Pld	T	G	FG	P
1990	Leeds	9				16
1991–94	Dewsbury	109				332
1995–97	Featherstone Rovers	56	26	0	0	104
	Total	174	26	0	0	452

Coaching information
Representative
Years	Team	Gms	W	D	L	W%
2020–	Kenya

Edward Rombo is a Kenyan former rugby union and rugby league footballer. He was one of the few Kenya rugby players to turn professional, when he moved to Leeds Rhinos in 1990.

== Playing career ==
Rombo was born in 1967 in Nairobi, Kenya. He started playing rugby union when he moved to Nairobi School for secondary school education, where he captained the 1986 school side. During his school years he also played for Barclays RFC, which won the Kenya Cup in 1987. After leaving school, he enrolled in the University of Nairobi, where he joined Mean Machine RFC.

On a trip to Singapore with the Watembezi Pacesetters VII he was awarded the player of the tournament, and soon after was signed by English rugby league club Leeds. He also went on to play for Dewsbury and Featherstone Rovers.

There have only been a few other players from Kenya that have played overseas, such as Benjamin Ayimba and Oscar Osir, who both had stints with the Cornish Pirates from 2005 to 2006 and Lucas Onyango who played for various professional rugby league clubs including Widnes Vikings. Teddy Omondi and Derrick Wamalwa also played professional rugby in France for Racing Club of Paris. Wamalwa was forced to retire due to knee injury. Omondi however continues and has just secured a new three-year contract. Willy Ambaka has also secured a pro-contract in France where he plies his trade. He took the opportunity to attend the University of Leeds and gain a degree in law.

He returned to Kenya in 1999, and played for Mwamba RFC between 1999 and 2003. Rombo later served as assistant coach for Kenya 7s and as a director on the Kenya Rugby Football Union Board from 2010 to 2012. He then retired and is now the Mwamba RFC coach.

== Managerial career ==
In 2020, Rombo was named head coach of the Kenya national rugby league team.
