= Lenana School =

Location
- Nairobi; Kenya
- 1°18′0.957″S 36°43′41.775″E

Information
- Former name: The Duke of York School
- Type: National, Public
- Motto: Nihil Praeter Optimum (Nothing But The Best)
- Established: 1949; 77 years ago
- Head teacher: William Kemei
- Enrollment: 1750
- Campus: Karen, Nairobi
- Colors: Maroon, Grey and White
- Alumni: The Laibon Society
- Website: www.lenanaschool.sc.ke

Lenana School is a secondary school in Nairobi, Kenya. It was formed in 1949 by colonial governor Philip Euen Mitchell, known then as the Duke of York School, named after a British World War II 1939 King George V-class battleship. The bell from HMS Duke of York is mounted on a bell-shed by the front of the school parade ground between the school chapel and the hall. The first students were briefly housed at the then-British colonial governor's house, which is the current State House as they waited for the school's completion. The founding principal was R. H. James.

The school was renamed Lenana School in 1969 after the central person in the conflict between British imperialists and the Maasai, the latter's spiritual leader Laibon Lenana. The first Kenyan principal of the school was James Kamunge. The referral to old students of the school changed from the phrase Old Yorkist to Laibons, the latter being a title given to religious figures of the Maasai. A picture of Lenana painted by a student artist called Sam Madoka hangs next to the steps that lead to the 2nd floor of the administration block.

In 2006, Lenana School was ranked the 26th-best high school in Kenya based on the Kenya Certificate of Secondary Education's results. Through the 1980s and into the 21st century, Lenana School has maintained high academic standards ranking in the top 10 and top 20 respectively for many years in the 1980s. The current principal is William Kemei.

== School emblem ==
The school emblem is the White Rose of York (also called the Rose alba or rose argent).

== Academics ==
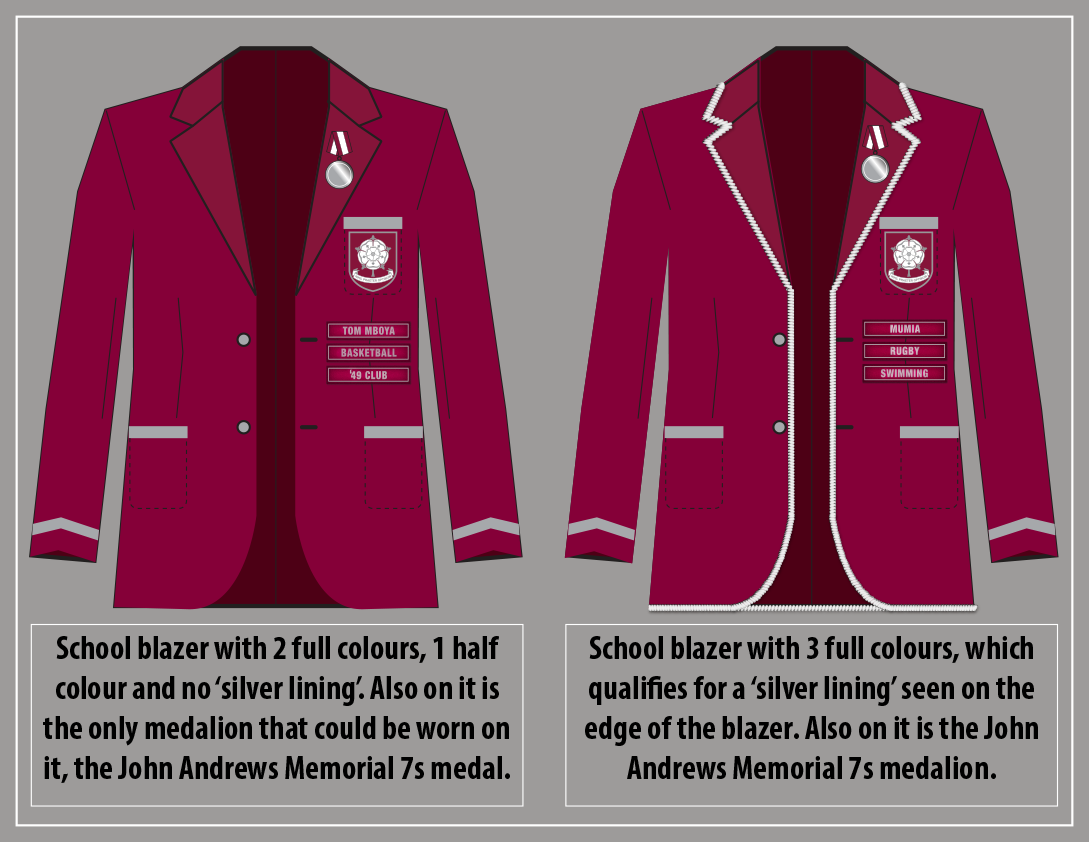
Illustration showing the basic student school blazer on the left and Silver Lined Blazer with the 3 colours required to attain a silver lining on the right.

Lenana School is categorized as a national school, which accepts students who do well in the Kenya Certificate of Primary Education examination nationwide. The school used have a good showing in the Kenya Certificate of Secondary Education nationwide but currently the school has been failing in its category of schools but still has a large enrolment.

== Cadet training era ==
Lenana School had a Combined Cadet Force training course of para-military standards. The course was started in the colonial era when the Mau Mau Uprising was at its peak to provide basic training for conscription in the all-white Kenya Regiment, and was mandatory for all students over 14 years of age. After the colonial era, Lenana continued the course until it was stopped by the government after the unsuccessful 1982 coup d'état. The cadet section had uniforms, guns, ammunition, an armoury, a parade ground with adjacent stores and offices, an obstacle course, and a shooting range. When the cadet training course was shut down the government collected all the guns and ammunition from the armoury but left the cadet uniforms behind. Until the late 1980s, teachers would hold an annual supervised shooting competition with most of the competitions taking place during the school's Founders Day holiday on 28 January.

== Sports ==
Lenana School 1982 15-a-side rugby squad poses for a team photo. They were the 1982 Prescott Cup winners.

Lenana School 1988 7-a-side rugby squad poses for a team photo in front of the school bell which was recovered from HMS Duke of York.

Lenana School's rugby team has been a major part of the school since 1949. Back then the sport (and the school) was reserved for the elite (predominantly white). Since then Lenana has been one of four elite rugby schools, and won many accolades, trophies, and tournaments. They were the only high school team to win a championship at club level. The school is always represented in the Kenyan high schools premier rugby league – the Prescott Cup, Damu Pevu Shield, the National Rugby championship, the Blackrock Rugby Festival and all other tournaments open to high school rugby. The school also hosts the John Andrews Memorial 7-a-side Rugby Tournament, in honour of a former student. Many former students have gone on to represent the country on the national team in international tournaments as well as play professionally abroad. The team is known as the Mean Maroon, and adorns the maroon jersey emblazoned with a white rose for home meets.

== Colour awards ==
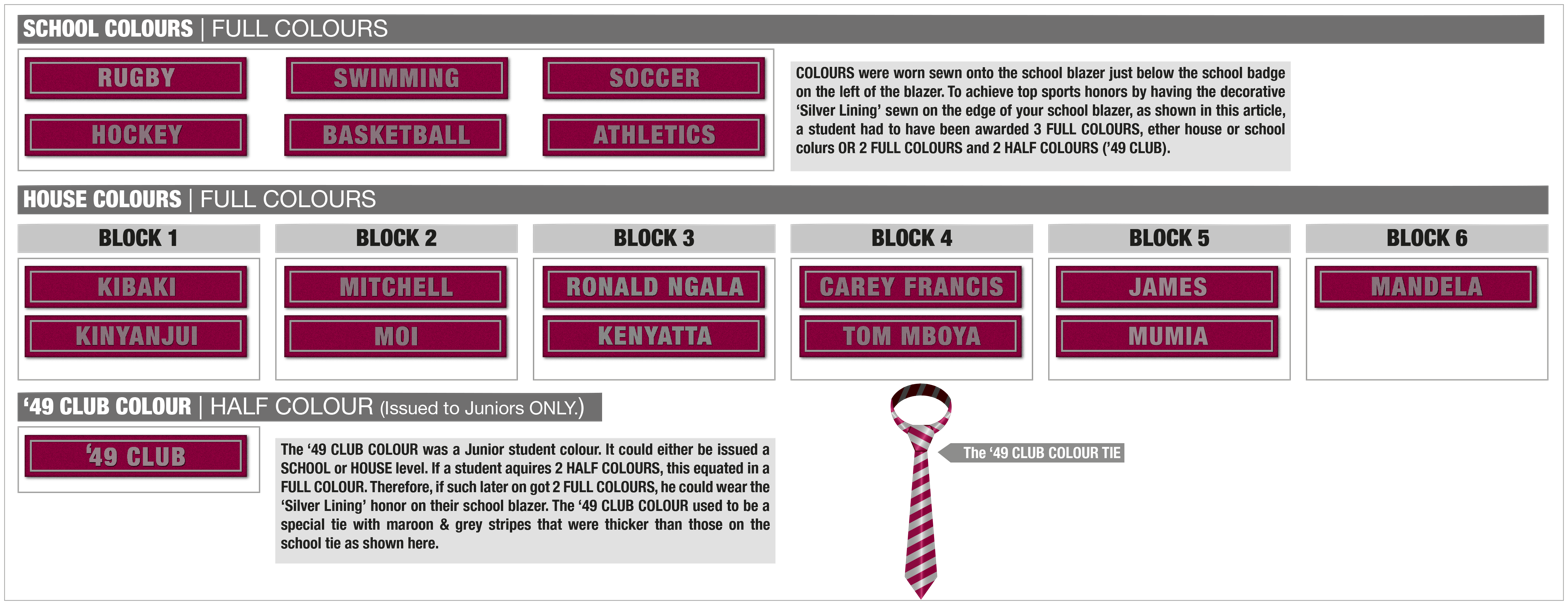
Lenana School sports award. These are the full School Colours, full House Colours & '49 Club half Colour that were issued to students for achievements in sports and worn on their school blazers.

The school had an awards scheme where students were awarded school or house colours depending on the sport they excelled in. The colours consisted of a piece of maroon cloth approximately three inches in length, three-quarters on an inch in width, and two-eighths of an inch thick. Its border and wording in the middle was embroidered with silver or white thread. There were two categories which are full and half colours. If a student acquired three full colours he was awarded a silver lining which was a thick silver or white thread that was sown all around the edge of his blazer.

== School sanatorium ==
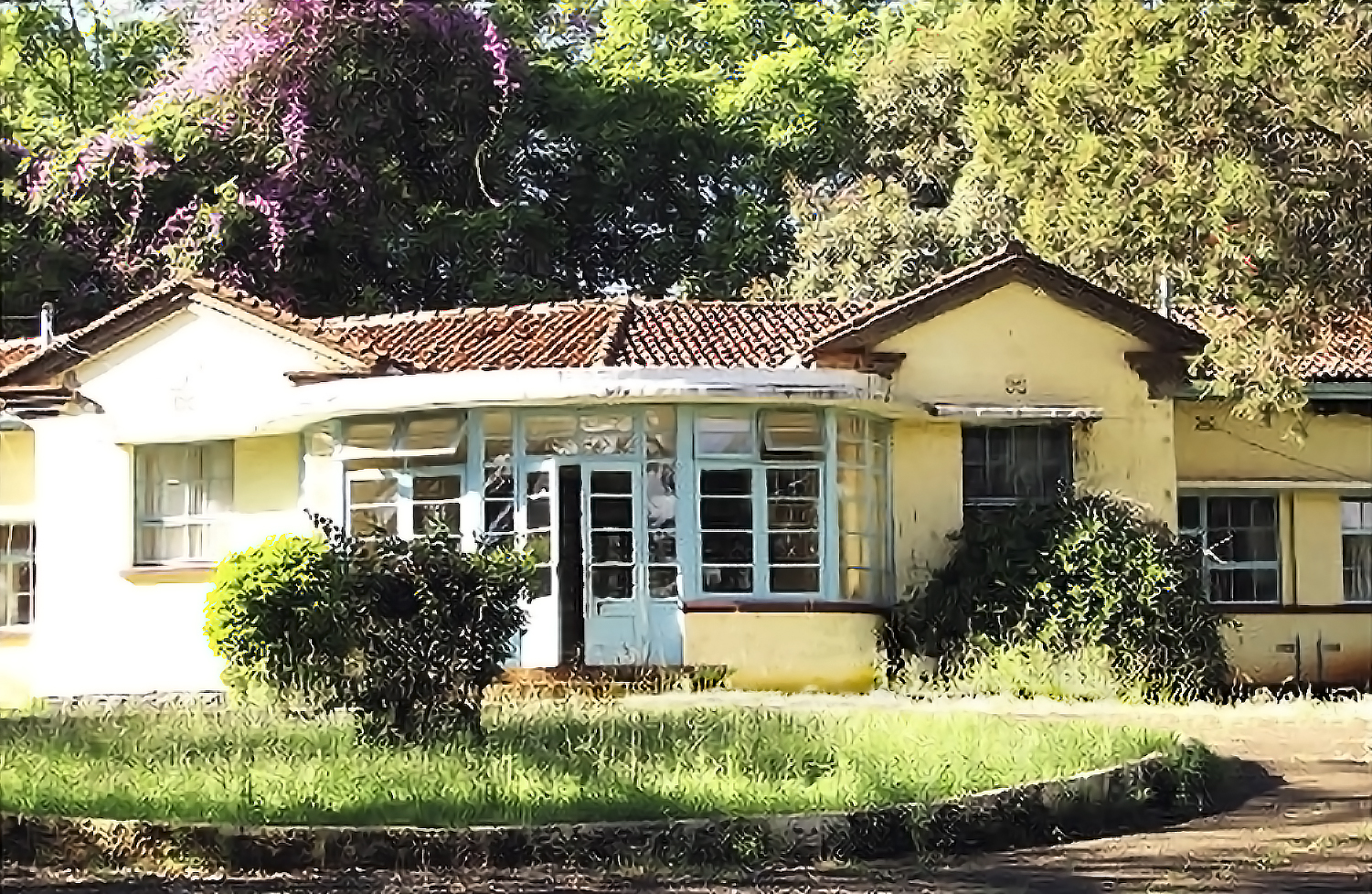
The front view of the Lenana School Sanatorium in 2011. Students accessed the clinic from the opposite end (chapel side) of the sanatorium while other school residents accessed it mainly from this end. The Ministry of Health (Kenya) has classified the school sanatorium as a 'Level 2' clinic.

Lenana School has a Level 2 classified sanatorium on its premises. It is equipped with a clinic and wards for in-patient treatment, and also provides medical counselling services. In 2019, the Kenyan Ministry of Health (MoH) designated the Lenana School sanatorium as a MoH Level Two Health Clinic, which helped it obtain National Hospital Insurance Fund-funded services.

== Notable alumni ==
- Wafula Chebukati
- Sir John Dunt, former Royal Navy officer
- Geoffrey Kent, founder, chairman, and CEO of Abercrombie & Kent
- Professor Kithure Kindiki
- Richard Leakey
- Joseph Mucheru, Kenyan Cabinet Secretary for ICT
- Abdullswamad Sherrif Nassir
- Malik Obama
- Johnson Sakaja, Kenyan Governor for Nairobi
- Sir Nilesh Samani
- John Sibi-Okumu
- Pascal Tokodi
- Binyavanga Wainaina
