= Stephen Russell (cricketer) =

English cricketer and businessman

Personal information
- Full name: Stephen George Russell
- Born: 13 March 1945 (age 81); Sutton, Surrey, England
- Batting: Right-handed
- Bowling: Right-arm fast-medium

Domestic team information
- Years: Team
- 1965–1967: Cambridge University
- 1967: Surrey

Career statistics
Competition	First-class
Matches	35
Runs scored	203
Batting average	5.48
100s/50s	0/0
Top score	21*
Balls bowled	4,752
Wickets	76
Bowling average	32.63
5 wickets in innings	4
10 wickets in match	0
Best bowling	5/41
Catches/stumpings	12/–
- Source: Cricinfo, 17 October 2016

Stephen George Russell (born 13 March 1945) is a retired English first-class cricket player and businessman.

Russell attended Tiffin School before going up to Trinity Hall, Cambridge. Opening the bowling and showing "commendable control at a lively pace", he won his cricket Blue for Cambridge University in 1965 and took 4 for 50 and 4 for 32 against Oxford University.

He had his best season in 1966, taking 41 wickets in 14 first-class matches for Cambridge at an average of 25.24. In Cambridge's sole victory that year, over Scotland, he took 3 for 49 and 5 for 41, including the first four wickets in Scotland's second innings, and then, coming in to bat at his usual position of number 11 with Cambridge needing 42 runs to win, he stayed with Rupert Roopnaraine while the runs were scored. He took 5 for 60 against Oxford, but Cambridge lost by an innings.

Russell "proved an inspiring captain" for Cambridge in 1967, but was less successful as a bowler, taking 19 wickets in 11 matches at an average of 44.26. He played one match for Surrey at the end of the season, taking two wickets.

He went into business, and was a director of Boots UK.
