= Nairobi School =

Secondary school in Kenya

Coordinates: 1°15.51′S 36°45.98′E

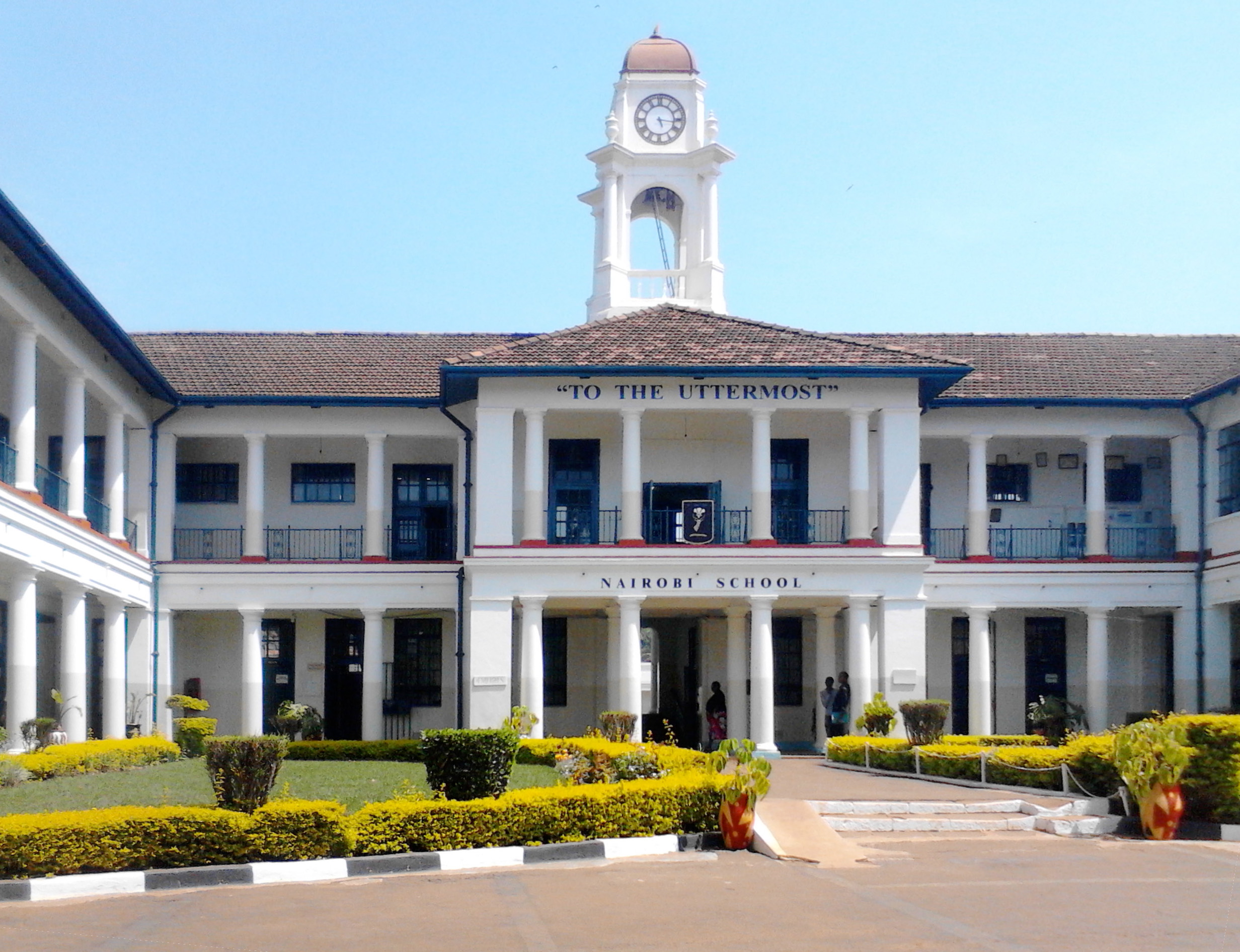
- Kitisuru Ward, Westlands Sub-County, Nairobi City County; Kenya

Information
- Type: National, Public
- Motto: To The Uttermost
- Established: 1902
- Sister school: The Kenya High School
- Principal: Caspar Momanyi Maina
- Enrollment: 2000
- Campus: Westlands, Nairobi
- Colors: Blue, yellow, grey and white
- Nickname: Patch
- Website: https://nairobischool.ac.ke

The Nairobi School is a secondary school in Nairobi, Kenya. It follows the national curriculum, is one of Kenya's 112 national schools and also one of the 18 prestigious Cluster III secondary schools.

It was founded in 1902 by the British settlers who had made Nairobi their home after the construction of the Uganda Railway. In 1925, Lord Delamere and Sir Edward Grigg, then Governor of Kenya, separated the European Nairobi School into a senior boys' school (Prince of Wales School), a senior girls' school (The Kenya High School) and a junior school (Nairobi Primary School).

In 1931, the boys' secondary school was moved to a 242-hectare (600-acre) allotment in the Kabete area (along Sclater's Road, today's Waiyaki Way), leaving the girls behind with the primary school pupils. The original idea for the name of the boys' school was Kabete Boys Secondary School, but the first headmaster, Captain Bertram W. L. Nicholson, thought this to be too clumsy and therefore the name Prince of Wales School, following Kenya's independence, it was renamed Nairobi School in 1965. The school is popularly referred to as 'Patch'.

Today the school, named after Kenya's capital, is one of the leading National Schools in the country. Nairobi School sits on over 80 ha (200 acres) of land about 11 kilometres (6.8 mi) from the city centre and has over 1,100 students currently enrolled. As of 2025, the current Chief Principal is Caspar Momanyi Maina. He came from Kisii School, and is still a principal of the institution.

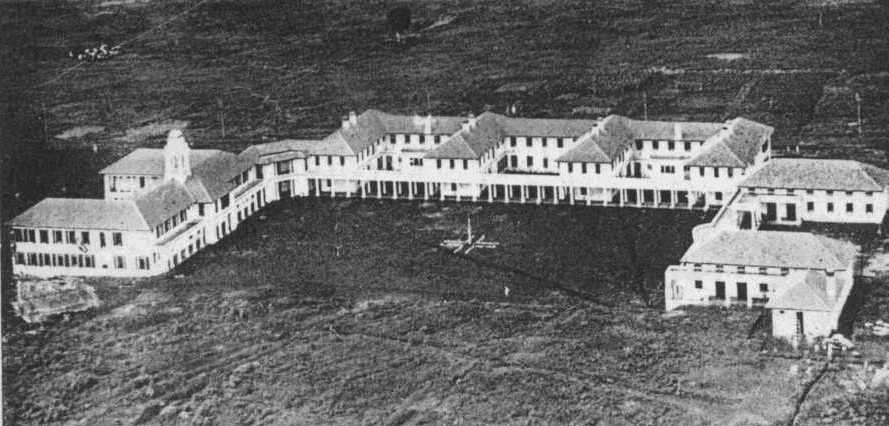
Prince of Wales School near Nairobi c1932

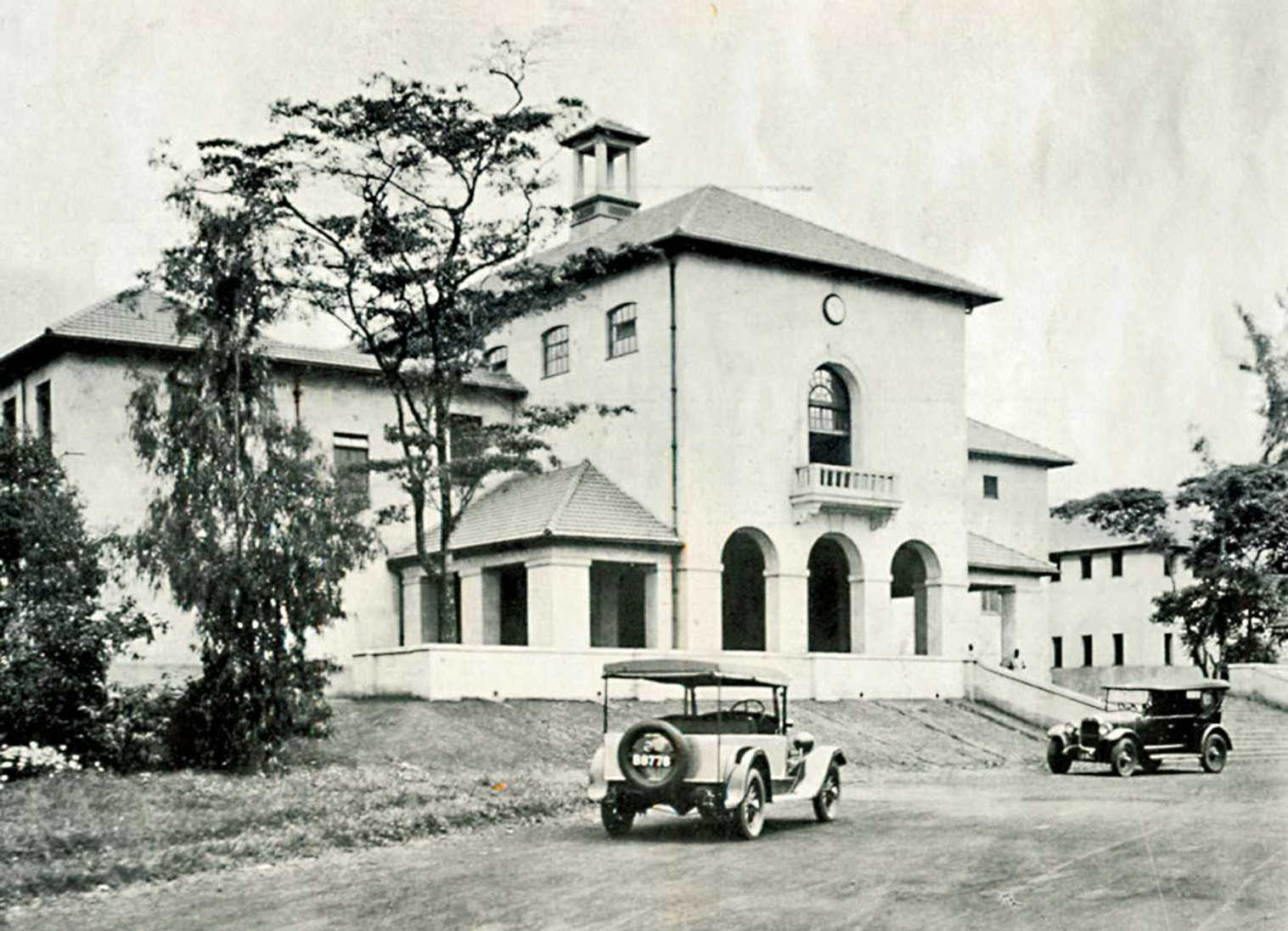
Nairobi Primary School, date unknown

== History ==
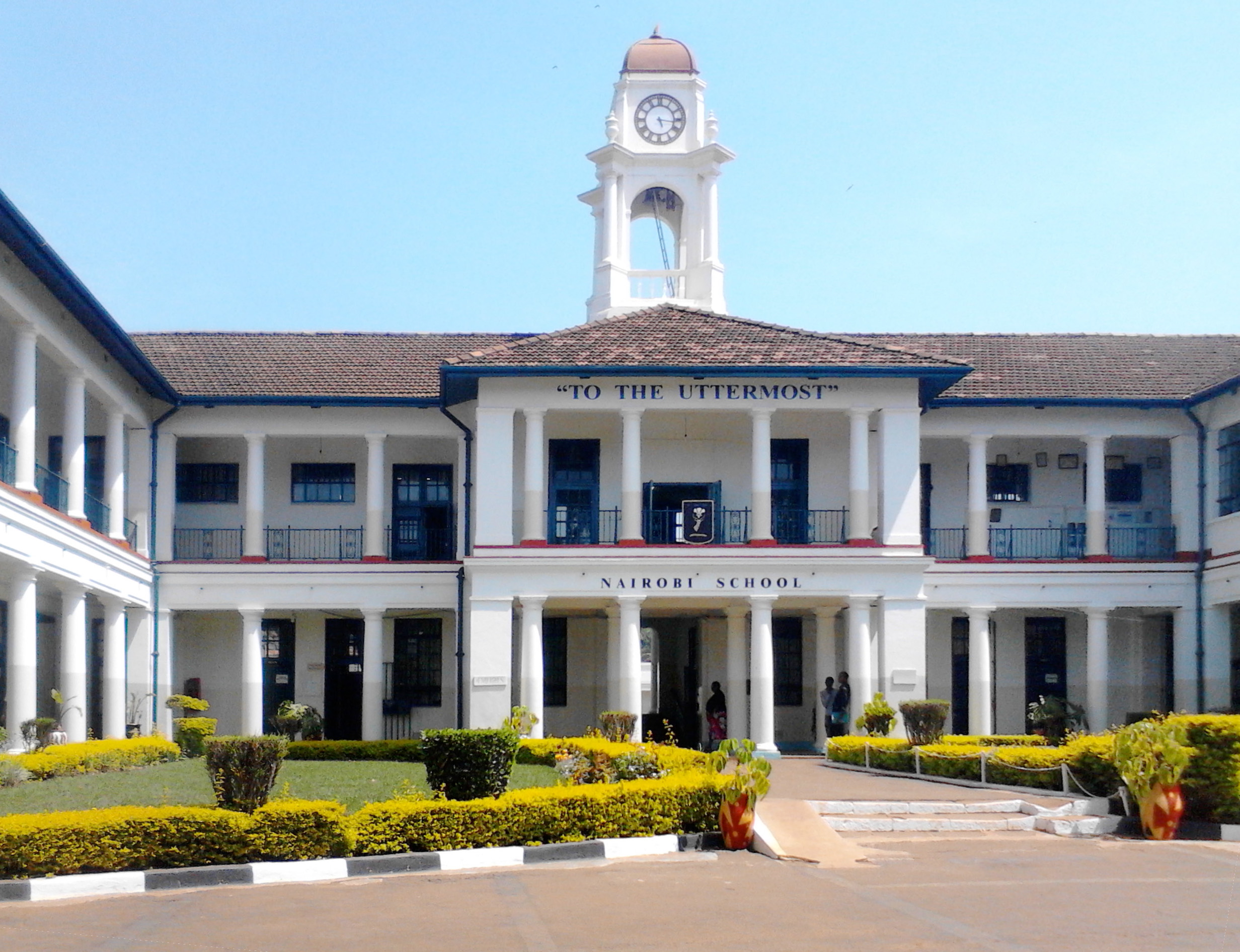
This photo taken on 6 June 2014 shows the administration block at Nairobi School with the school motto emblazoned on it.

Nairobi School was established in 1902 around the present day Nairobi Railways Club as a European school to serve the families of the I.B.E.A. Company and, a while later, the white settler community. Due to the foresight of Lord Delamere in proposing the building of a senior Boys school (now Nairobi Primary), and the support of the then Governor, Sir Edward Grigg, the railway reserve grounds near Kabete were set aside for future use.

In 1928, Sir Herbert Baker was commissioned to plan a school similar to Winchester School in England, attended by both Lord Delamere and the then Governor of Kenya. Captain B.W.L. Nicholson, R.N., from the Royal Naval College, Dartmouth, was appointed Headmaster of the European Nairobi School while planning for the New Boys School to be built at Kabete. Captain Nicholson designed the school uniform and discipline based on the British naval system; meanwhile Mrs. Nicholson and Rev. Gillett worked on the gardens of the new School.

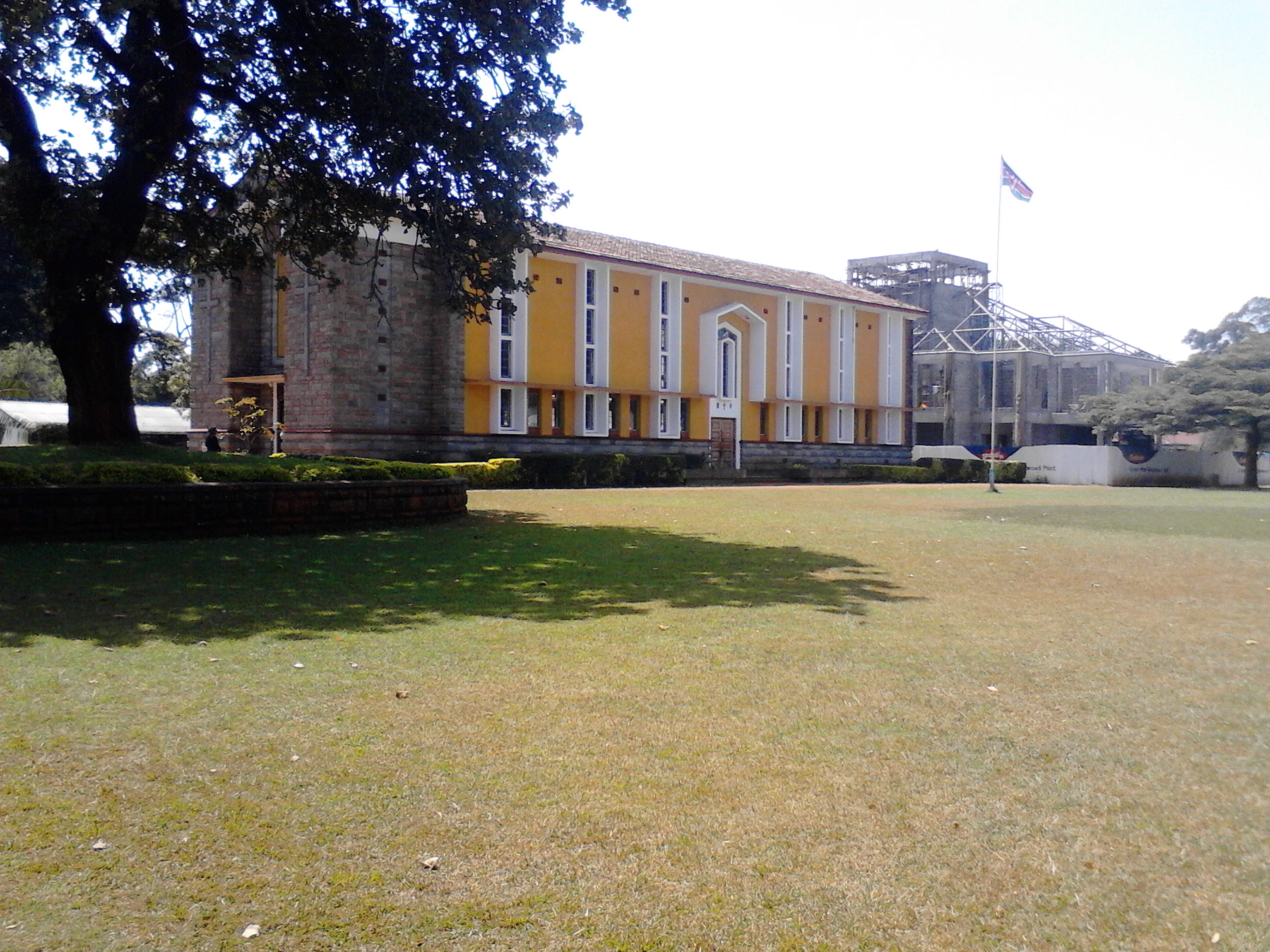
This photo, taken from the Nairobi School's Quadrangle, shows the School Chapel. The chapel is open for use to all Christian denominations at pre-designated times of the week

On 24 September 1929 the foundation stone was laid by Edward Grigg, the Governor of Kenya Colony, for a school with a capacity of 80 boys. Under the stone was preserved a copy of the newspaper of the day. The School opened in 1931, not only for the 80 boys it was designed, but with 84 boarders and 20-day boys. The headmaster felt the old name 'Kabete Boys Secondary School' was too clumsy and it was given the name 'Prince of Wales School', with the Prince of Wales feathers inserted between the horns of a Royal Impala as the School badge, accompanied by the school motto "TO THE UTTERMOST".

Enrolment proved higher than initially anticipated, requiring new classrooms. Due to a general shortage of cement, the first wooden classrooms were erected around 1938. The School population increased further because of World War II and the Governor of Kenya authorised the building of corrugated iron dormitories (the group of buildings that later became Intermediate/Fletcher House – the current Music Room). It was called 'Lacey's Landies'. The effects of the war were felt more when the Italians joined in June 1940, including the fear of bombing, and it was made a day school. In June 1940, a military hospital took over the buildings and the students were moved back to the European Nairobi School (the present Nairobi Primary School.)

During the Christmas break of 1941, the whole school came back to Kabete, and the space at the European Nairobi School was taken over by the Girls' Secondary School. In 1942, European education was made compulsory and enrollment increased so much that new temporary classrooms were needed. The wooden classrooms were erected as a "temporary wartime measure." Clive, Grigg, Hawke and Rhodes Houses (the only four houses at the time) were all accommodated in the permanent building adjacent to the tuition block. Today those are two houses, known as Marsabit and Elgon. The period 1943 to 1944 saw the Rhodes/Nicholson complex being built, which is the Serengeti and Athi Houses complex today. A Sanatorium and School Hall were constructed in 1945. A sister school, the Duke of York school (today, Lenana School) was founded in 1948.

Nairobi School had a cadet training course of paramilitary standard in which students could enroll. The cadet course was started in the colonial era when Mau Mau activity was at its peak. After the colonial era Kenya Regiment, the school continued with the cadet course until stopped by the government after the unsuccessful 1982 coup d'état. The cadet section had uniforms, guns, ammunition, an armory, a parade ground with adjacent stores and offices and a shooting range.

Kenya Regiment cadets took part in march-pasts during National Days. They also used to be assigned sentry duty at the main gate and around the school at night. Successful cadets who passed out would be issued rank. The cadets, after completion of their form 6 education, could further their careers by joining the armed forces as officer cadets.

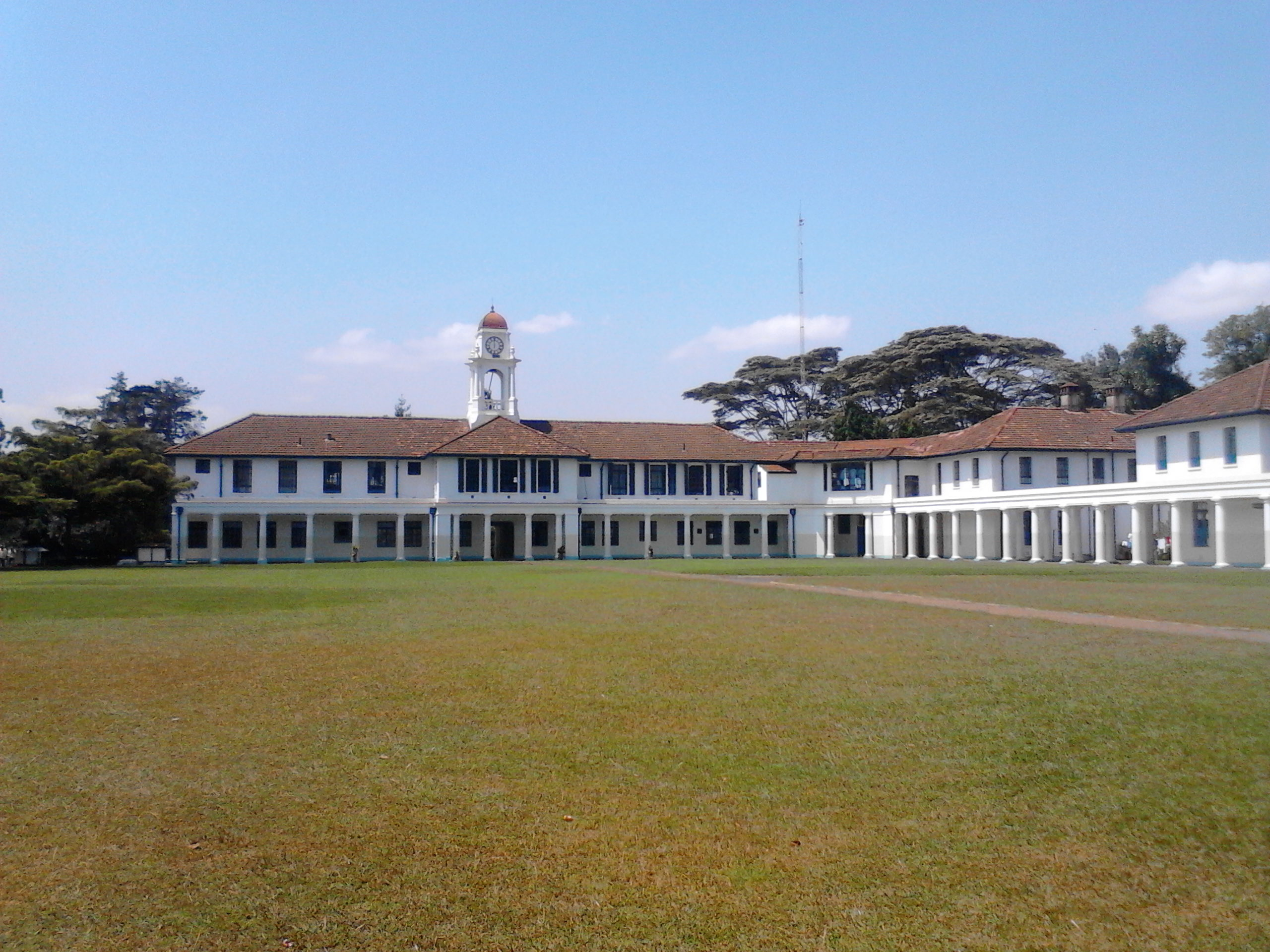
This is a view of the Administration Block from the back. The open space is the School's Quadrangle.

== School curriculum ==
Nairobi School follows the 8-4-4 system of education. The school curriculum is provided by the Kenya Institute of Curriculum Development, a department of the Ministry of Education in Kenya. The subjects offered in the school are as follows:

In form one, the compulsory subjects are: English, Kiswahili, Mathematics. Biology, Physics, Chemistry, History and Government, Geography and Business Studies. Students may choose between Christian Religious Education and Islamic Religious Education. They may also choose one subject among the following: Agriculture, Art and Design, Drawing and design, Computer Studies, French or Music and Aviation.

In forms two, three and four, English, Kiswahili, Mathematics, Biology, Physics and Chemistry are compulsory subjects; students may then choose two subjects from the remaining courses taught in form one.

== Houses ==
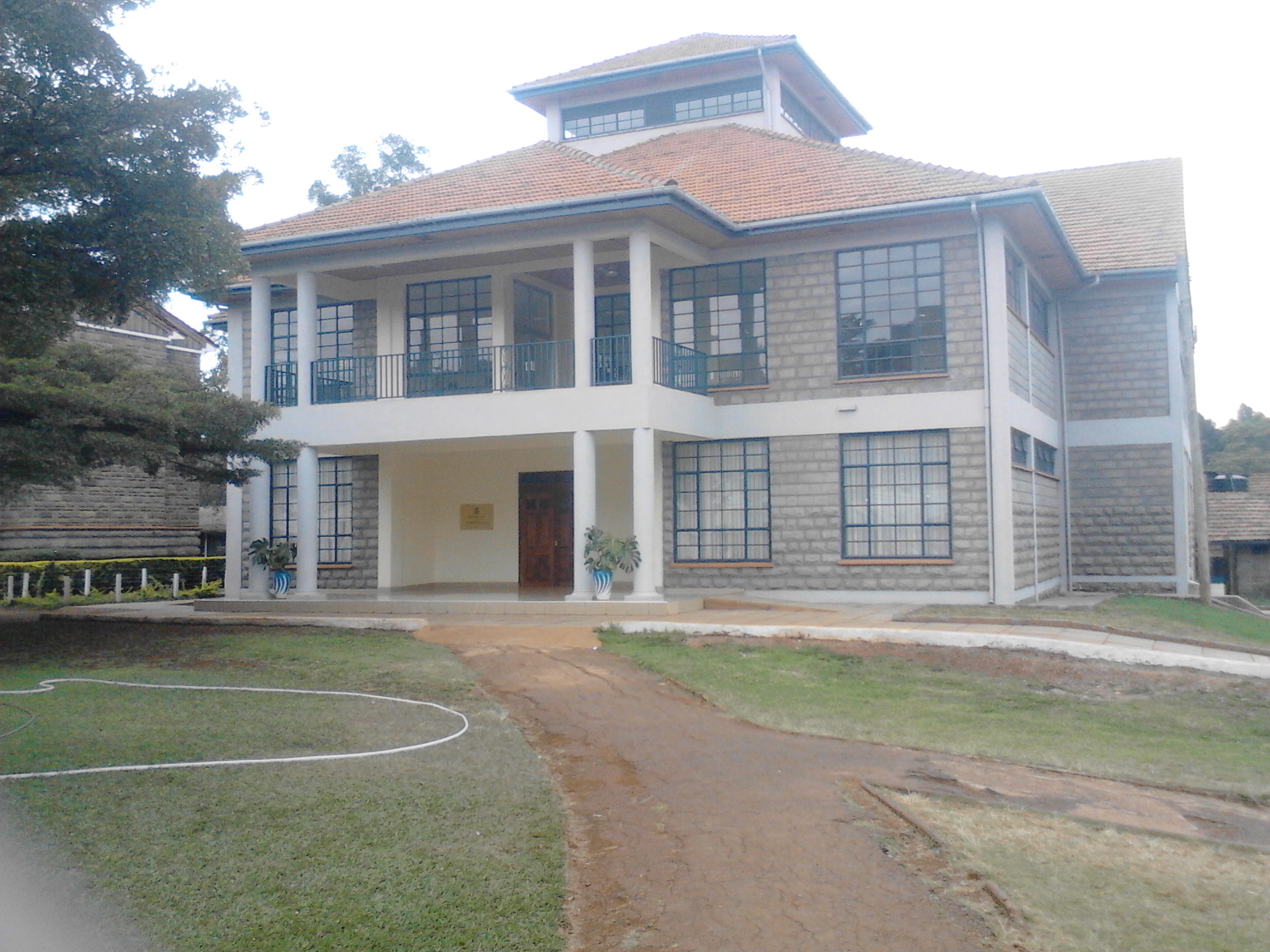
The Main Library Complex at Nairobi School

Nairobi school has nine houses, to one of which each student belongs. The houses serve as dormitories, as well as for student organisation for the purpose of sports days, dining hall seating and school assembly. Students develop strong links with members of their house, and these become evident on sports days as well as in academics. Each house is headed by a house master/mistress in collaboration with the house captains who are also members of the student council. The houses are:

1. Athi house (formerly Rhodes house);
2. Baringo house (formerly Hawke house);
3. Elgon house (formerly Clive house);
4. Kirinyaga house (formerly Grigg house);
5. Longonot house
6. Marsabit (formerly Scott house);
7. Naivasha house (formerly Fletcher house);
8. Serengeti house (formerly Nicholson house);
9. Tana house (formerly Junior house)
10. Ngong' house.

The name changes, reflecting geographical areas in Kenya, were adopted in 1975 as part of a deliberate policy of Africanisation.

Each house is identified by a distinct colour: Athi is red, Baringo blue, Elgon white, Kirinyaga black, Longonot purple, Marsabit yellow, Naivasha brown, Serengeti green and Tana maroon.

In popular culture

The administration block was used as the setting for the Government House in the Oscar-winning movie Out of Africa, based on a book with the same title by the Danish writer Karen Blixen.

=== Student leadership and identifying attire ===
Nairobi School uses different tie designs to distinguish certain student leadership positions. Grade 10 prefects wear bright yellow ties (a.k.a 'blue-band' among learners), while prefects in higher grades e.g. Deputy House Captains, Class Monitors, Band Leaders e.t.c. wear ties with thick orange and blue stripes (known as zebras among learners due to its stripes). House captains wear black ties. Deputy Heads of School wear plain red ties, while the Head of School wears a tie bearing the school logo and the initials "H.O.S." beneath it.

The different ties serve as visual identifiers for the respective student leadership roles.

== Notable alumni ==
'Old Boys' of the school are called Old Cambrians.

- George Coventry, 13th Earl of Coventry
- Geoffrey Griffin, Founder of Starehe Boys Centre
- Gitobu Imanyara, a lawyer and politician in Kenya.
- Keith McAdam, a former Scottish Cricketer and a specialist in tropical diseases.
- Musalia Mudavadi, politician and former vice president in 2002, Prime Cabinet Secretary following the 2022 Kenyan General Election. He was also the house captain Kirinyaga house (1976).
- George Nyamweya, Kenyan politician.
- Paul Otuoma, Politician and member of parliament
- Colin Rawlins, British colonial civil servant.
- Michael Riegels, Lawyer and Civil servant in the British Virgin Islands
- Timothy Rimbui, a Kenyan record producer, sound engineer and songwriter better known as "Ennovator"
- Edward Rombo, rugby player
- Shakeel Shabbir, Former Kisumu Mayor and current Member of Parliament.
- David Steel, UK politician who served as the Leader of the Liberal Party from 1976 until its merger with the Social Democratic Party in 1988 to form the Liberal Democrats.
- Roger Whittaker, British singer-songwriter and musician.
- Kleptomaniax, a hip hop boys band
