= Rosslyn Academy =

- The school's administration building

Location
- Gigiri, Nairobi; Kenya; 1°13′29″S 36°48′31″E

Information
- Former name: Mara Hills Academy
- Type: Private day
- Religious affiliation: Christianity
- Established: • 1946 (80 years ago) in Tanzania • 1967 (59 years ago) in Kenya
- Grades: Preschool – 12
- Gender: Coeducational
- Enrollment: 692
- Education system: American
- Language: English
- Hours in school day: 7 hours, not including extracurricular activities
- Campus size: 40 acres
- Colors: Green, Black, and Silver
- Sports: Football, basketball, cross country running, tennis, golf, swimming, field hockey, rugby union, volleyball, and water polo
- Mascot: Eddie the Eagle
- Nickname: The Eagles
- Rival: Rift Valley Academy
- Curriculum: American-based
- Accreditation: ACSI, MSA
- Website: rosslynacademy.org

Rosslyn Academy is a private Christian school in Gigiri, Nairobi, Kenya. It is an international, coed, day school with a North American curriculum and classes from preschool to twelfth grade.

Enrolment is approximately 690, with a graduating senior class of approximately 60 students each year. Approximately 40 percent of the students are North American, and more than 53 nationalities are represented in the school. Teachers at Rosslyn are typically required to be North American certified, but come from a number of different nationalities, with the majority being North American. The average class size at Rosslyn is 20 students, with a teacher to student ratio of 1:9.

It is located in the northwestern suburbs of Nairobi, in Gigiri, on a 40-acre campus close to the United States Embassy and the United Nations Headquarters for Africa. The site was originally part of a coffee plantation.

== History ==
The school was founded as Mara Hills Academy by the Eastern Mennonite Mission in northern Tanganyika in the 1940s, as a one-room school for the children of Mennonite missionaries. The school moved to its current location in 1967, and opened a boarding facility offering K–9 education.

The school remained a boarding school into the 1970s when the Foreign Mission Board of the Southern Baptist Convention (now the International Mission Board) invested in the school to provide an American education for the children of its missionaries residing in the Nairobi area. This was also a critical financial move in the history of the school as it saved it from financial insolvency. In the late 1980s, the Assemblies of God became the third sponsoring mission.

The school remained strictly a K–9 school until the late 1980s. Most of the students transferred to the Rift Valley Academy upon entering tenth grade. However, the school gradually added a high school program and graduated its first senior class in 1991. Today, the school offers a wide-ranging liberal arts program, including courses in the social sciences, natural sciences, mathematics, literature, world languages, and the arts. The school also has one of the largest and most successful Advanced Placement AP programs in Africa, typically offering between fifteen and twenty different courses each year, and boasting a pass rate of approximately 85% (25% above the global average).

== Accreditation and membership ==
Middle States Association of Colleges and Schools (MSA), Association of Christian Schools International (ACSI), Association of International Schools of Africa (AISA), AP/College Board, Child Safety Protection Network (CSPN), International Association for College Admission Counselling (International ACAC)

== Fine arts and sports ==
The school is also now known for its strong fine arts and sports programs. The Rosslyn Eagles consistently place among the top of their leagues in both men's and women's varsity and junior varsity sports. The inter-schools athletic program includes men's and women's football (soccer), basketball, volleyball, field hockey, rugby, tennis, water polo and swimming. The Eagles' traditional rivals are the other large international schools in Kenya, namely the Rift Valley Academy Buffalos and the International School of Kenya Lions.

== Notable Alumni and Former Students ==
Mark Wiens - Founder of Migrationology.com, one of the world’s leading food travel vlogs and YouTube channels with over 10 million subscribers and approximately 2 billion views.

Bozoma Saint John - Chief Marketing Officer of Netflix

Brook Hazelton - Former President of Christie’s for North and South America, founder of St. James Partners and President of Digital Reasoning.

== Other information ==
- Education in Kenya
- Education in Tanzania
- List of Assemblies of God schools
- List of international schools
- List of schools in Kenya
- List of schools in Tanzania
