= Thika High School =

Boarding school in Central Province, Kenya

Coordinates: 1°02′34″S 37°05′13″E

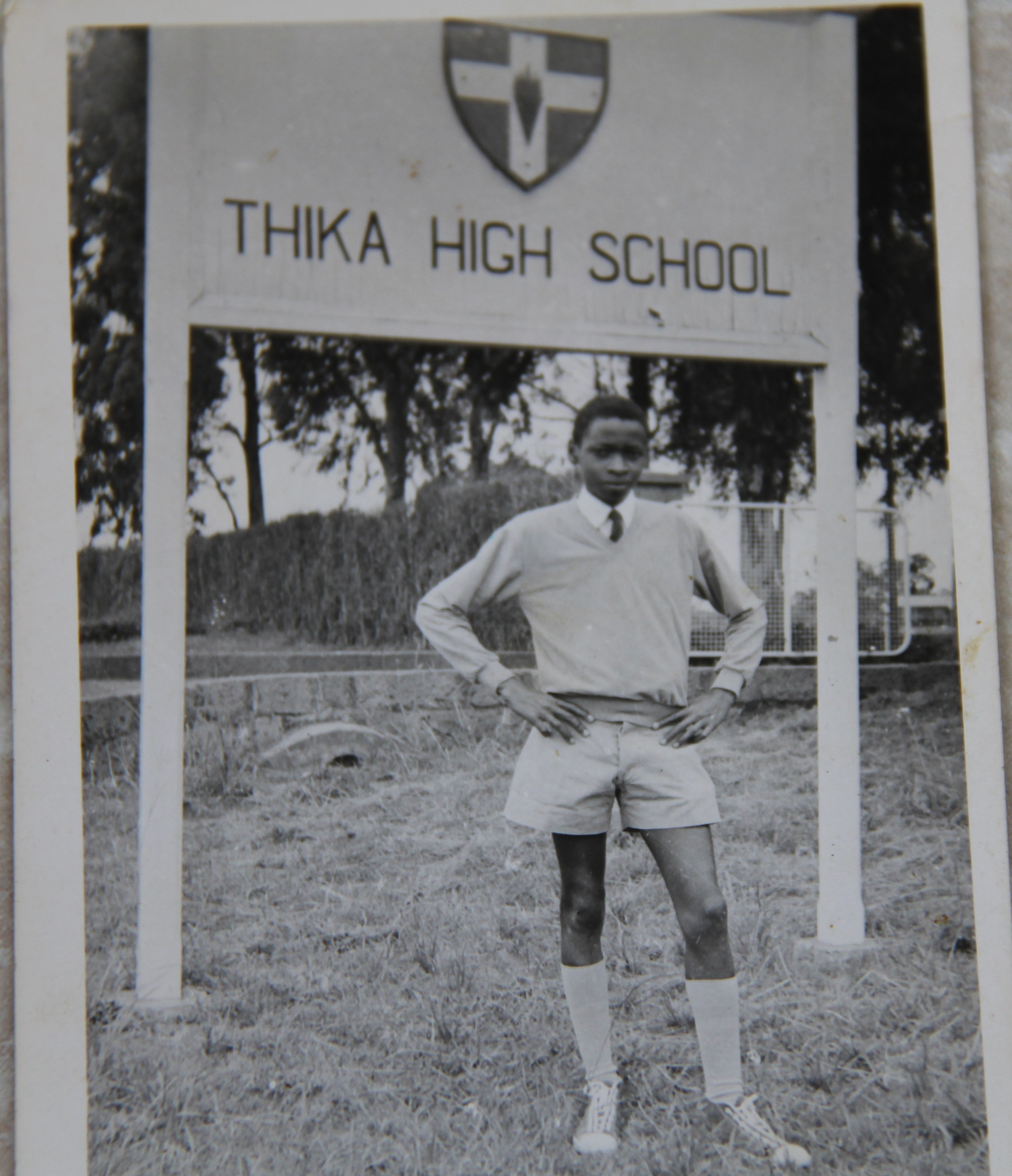
- Thika High School with F. George Njoroge

Information
- Established: 1951; 75 years ago
- Gender: Boys

Thika High School is a boys-only boarding high school located in Thika District in Central Province, Kenya. Thika High School was founded in 1951, while Kenya was still a British Colony, by the Alliance of Protestant Churches and the Church of Scotland Mission (later known as the Presbyterian Church of East Africa or PCEA). It was originally set at the site of the current Thogoto Teachers College, but due to its proximity to another PCEA boys' school, Alliance Boys' High School, it was moved to Thika. The school is known for its academic and sports excellence from its foundation to the mid-1950s.

== Curriculum ==
Thika High School offers a college preparatory program following the Kenya Certificate of Secondary Education curriculum.

== Notable alumni ==
- Jackton Boma Ojwang, associate justice of the Supreme Court of Kenya
- Irungu Kang'ata (Senator, Murang'a County)
- Paul Muite (Former Member or Parliament, Kikuyu Constituency)
- Linus Gitahi (Former CEO, Nation Media Group)
