= Dagoretti High School =

Location
- Nairobi; Kenya
- Coordinates: 1°16′32″S 36°42′49″E

Information
- Type: Provincial, public
- Motto: Elimu Ni Mali
- Established: 1962
- Enrollment: approx 1000
- Campus: Dagoretti, Nairobi
- Colors: Maroon, white, green, grey

Dagoretti High School is a high school in the Dagoretti area of Nairobi county, Kenya. It is a Provincial School located 16 Kilometres from the Nairobi City centre along the Nairobi-Kikuyu Road. The School has eight streams (as from 2018) B, G, Y, P, W, C, M, R. It is a day and boarding school with a student population of roughly 1700.

== History ==
Originally set up in 1929 as Ruthimitu Independent School, Dagoretti High School emerged as a response to the expulsion of African pupils from mission schools due to their support for the Female genital mutilation rite of passage for Kikuyu girls.

However, the school faced opposition from both the missionaries and the colonial government, leading to its closure in the early 1930s. The persistence and determination of African leaders, notably President Jomo Kenyatta, paved the way for the school’s reopening in 1939. Under the new management of the Kikuyu Karing’a School Association (KKSA), the institution was renamed Waithaka Independent School. Mr. Eliud Mathu, a distinguished graduate of Makerere University College in Uganda, assumed the role of the first principal around 1942.

Sadly, during the state of emergency in Kenya, the school was abruptly shut down in 1954 and repurposed as a detention camp for Mau Mau prisoners. However, adversity only fuelled the school’s resolve to provide quality education. In 1959, - via the initiative of people such as the first Member of Parliament for Dagoretti Constituency Dr Njoroge Magana Mungai - the conversion of the detention camp back into a school began, with the aim of admitting its first batch of Form One students in January 1961. Construction delays led to a temporary arrangement, and the inaugural Form One students were accommodated at Thika High School for one year.

On 15 November 1961, a significant milestone was reached. The Dagoretti Locational Council, supported by the Kiambu District Education Officer, Mr. J. E. Cowley, proposed a name change for the school, and it officially became Dagoretti High School. Its doors finally opened to its first cohort of students in January 1962.

A committee consisting of prominent individuals - including Mr. Eliud Njuguna Kuria, Mr. Tiras Waiyaki, Mr. Peter Kuria Ndwaru, and Mr. Geoffrey Kiuna - was entrusted with the responsibility of overseeing the school’s administration. Their first meeting on 28 March 1962 marked the beginning of a collaborative effort to shape the future of the institution. The first Headmaster of the school was Mr N. C. Bhatt.

A significant turning point arrived on 21 September 1963 when Dagoretti High School was officially inaugurated by Mr. Kenneth Matiba, the then Permanent Secretary for Education. This auspicious occasion symbolised the unwavering commitment to educational excellence and the anticipation of a bright future for generations of students to come.

== Extracurricular activities ==
Dagoretti High School dominated the Traditional Dance category of the Kenya National Drama festivals throughout the 1990s holding the High Schools Category for many years and in 2004 and 2005 Drama Festivals the school made history by winning consecutive drama dance titles. Also the school has clubs that help involve the students in social activities and campaigns. e.g. SCAD (Students Campaign Against Drugs), St. John Club, Computer Club, Science Club etc.

== Notable alumni ==
- Dr. Alfred Mutua - Former government spokesman, former Machakos Governor, current Cabinet Secretary (CS) for the Ministry of Labour and Social Protection in Kenya
- Kevin Wyre - Pop Artist
- Ferdinand Waititu- Fmr. Governor for Kiambu County
- John Kiarie - Member of Parliament, Dagoretti South
- Renson Michael - Content Curator, TRACE EA
