= Moi Forces Academy, Nairobi =

Secondary school for boys in Kenya

- Huruma, Nairobi

Information
- Other name: MFA
- Type: National, Public
- Motto: Excellence our commitment
- Established: 1980
- Principal: Mr. J.k. Maina
- Staff: 100
- Enrollment: 2000+
- Campus type: Urban
- Color: Blue
- Website: www.moiforcesacademy.co.ke

Moi Forces Academy is a Kenyan boy's national secondary school located in Kamukunji Constituency, Nairobi county, Kenya. It is also among the 18 pioneer Cluster 3 national schools in Kenya.

Moi Forces Academy (MFA) is a national public school for boys established in 1980 by the second president of the Republic of Kenya, Hon. Daniel T. arap Moi CGH. Initially, the academy was born out of a request by the Moi Air Base nursery school children that the former president builds them a school to avoid travelling long distances to access primary schools.

== History ==
The school was founded in the 80s as a Centre of excellence for the children of the Armed Forces. Former Kenyan President, Daniel arap Moi was instrumental in establishing the school, conducting the first Harambee fund raising for the construction of the school. Phase one of the school was constructed at a cost of Ksh. 7 million by Danny Construction Company. The Primary Division of the academy opened with standard one pupils on 11 February 1980. This was followed by the admission of Form ones on 18 February 1980 and that of Form five on 6 May 1980. It stands on 56 Hectares of land donated by the Kenya Air Force, Moi Air Base. In 1989, the academy phased out the three streams of Form 5 and 6 with the full implementation of the 8.4.4 system of education.The school begun as a mixed boarding secondary. In 1990, the secondary division became a fully boys' secondary school with the transfer of girls to Moi Lanet.

== Academics ==
The school accepts bright students from both the Armed Forces and Civilian population. The school is one of the few secondary schools in Kenya that offer aviation studies. Moi Forces Academy has a good academic reputation and often posts good results in the annual KCSE examinations. Moi forces academy's graduates go on to leading Kenyan universities as well as global ones, a good number of MFA graduates have secured scholarships to study in prestigious Western, Chinese and Russian universities. Some of its students have also been selected to attend the African Leadership Academy.

== School Curriculum ==
Moi Forces Academy follows the 8-4-4 system of education. The school curriculum is provided by the Kenya Institute of Curriculum Development, a department of the Ministry of Education in Kenya. The subjects offered in the school are as follows:

In Form one, the compulsory subjects are: English, Kiswahili, Mathematics. Biology, Physics, Chemistry, History and Government, Geography and Business Studies. Students may choose between Christian Religious Education and Islamic Religious Education. They may also choose one subject among the following: Agriculture, Art and Design, Drawing and design, Computer Studies, French, German, Arabic, Aviation, Wood work or Music.

In Form Two, Three and Four, English, Kiswahili, Mathematics, Biology, Physics and Chemistry are compulsory subjects, students may then choose two subjects from the remaining courses taught in Form 1 and 2.

== Houses ==
The school has nine houses in total, each student belongs to one of the houses. The houses serve as dormitories, as well as for student organisation for the purpose of inter-house competitions. The houses are:

1. Mombasa

2. Nanyuki

3. Lanet

4. Lang'ata

5. Eldoret

6. Isiolo

7. Mtongwe

8. Moi

9.Laikipia

== Notable alumni ==
- Aden Duale – Cabinet Secretary for Defense
- Anne Waiguru – Governor, Kirinyaga County
- Linah Kilimo – Kenyan politician and MP for Marakwet East in the 9th and 10th parliament
- Simon Mbugua – Kamukunji MP in the 10th parliament and EALA MP
- John Njiraini – Former Kenya Revenue Authority commissioner general
