= Rift Valley Academy =

Christian boarding school in Kijabe, Kenya

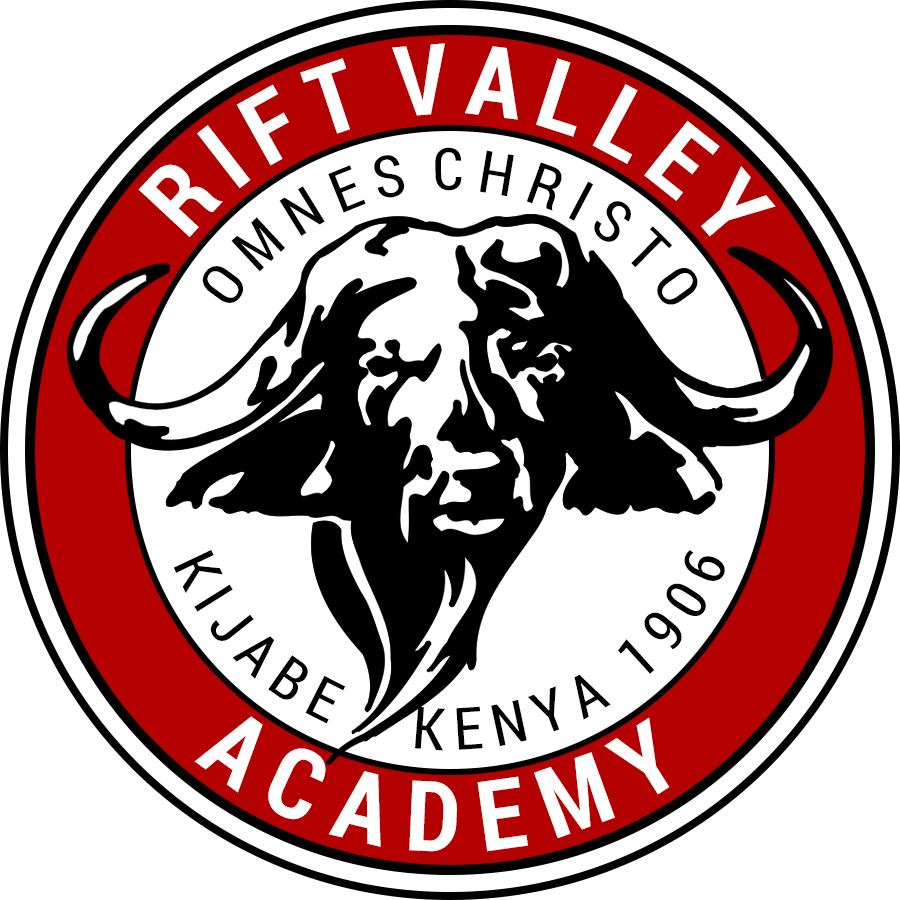

Location
- PO Box 80; Kijabe, Kiambu County; Kenya
- Coordinates: 0°56′39″S 36°35′47″E

Information
- Type: Private boarding
- Motto: Omnes Christo (All In Christ)
- Religious affiliation: Christian
- Established: 1906
- Founder: Charles Hurlburt
- Oversight: Africa Inland Mission
- Faculty: 53
- Grades: K–12
- Gender: Male and female
- Enrollment: Over 500
- Education system: American
- Language: English
- Campus type: Rural
- Colors: White, red and black
- Athletics: Football, tennis, basketball, field hockey, rugby
- Mascot: Cape Buffalo
- Nickname: Buff's
- Rival: Rosslyn Academy; St. Mary's School; ISK; Ofafa Jericho;
- Yearbook: Kiambogo
- Affiliations: Africa Inland Church
- Website: http://www.rva.org

Rift Valley Academy (RVA) is a Christian boarding school run by the Africa Inland Mission, a Protestant missionary organisation, in Kijabe, Kenya. It was founded in 1906 by Charles Hurlburt.

It was ranked second out of the top 100 best high schools in Africa by Africa Almanac in 2003, based upon quality of education, student engagement, strength and activities of alumni, school profile, Internet and news visibility.

RVA has a strong rugby culture as shown by the number of titles of the Blackrock Rugby Festival (12) and also Prescott Cup among others.

== Notable alumni ==
- Erik Hersman
- Jason Fader
- Yo-El Ju
- Eugene Omalla

== See also ==
- List of boarding schools
