= Ofafa =

- Suburb
- Location in Kenya
- Coordinates: 1°17′38″S 36°51′39″E
- Country: Kenya
- Region: Nairobi region
- County: Nairobi County

Ofafa is a southeastern neighborhood of Nairobi, Kenya in a low income, high-density area generally known as the Eastlands. Politically it belongs to Makadara Constituency. In the mid-1950s the Quakers erected a building in Ofafa to act as a hub for individual craftspeople making and selling furniture. It is also known for its Jericho school.

Early housing estates there were part of Erica Mann's planning work in the 1940s and 1950s. The Ofafa Jerusalem scheme created two-storey blocks of maisonettes that were connected to the electrical supply, had an internal water supply and sanitation, and were surrounded by ample open space. The 1950s Ofafa Jericho estate was built in a similar style but now houses about 50,000 people: five times more than it was intended for. People are living in poor quality iron sheet extensions and water and waste management are inadequate.

Ofafa was named after Ambrose Ofafa, a prominent politician who received a Colonial Service award on the 1953 Coronation Honours list, and was murdered in November of the same year.
