= Kenya Certificate of Primary Education =

Primary school exam in Kenya

The Kenya Certificate of Primary Education (KCPE) was a certificate awarded to students after completing the approved eight-year course in primary education in Kenya. The examination was supervised by the Kenya National Examination Council (KNEC), an examining body in Kenya under the Ministry of Education. The same body also conducted and regulated the Kenya Certificate of Secondary Education (KCSE), a certificate awarded to students after completing secondary education. KCPE and KCSE were both started in 1985 when the 8-4-4 system of education was introduced in Kenya.The last KCPE examination, under this system was done on November 1, 2023 at 11am. These exams were replaced by KJSEA (Kenya Junior Secondary Education Assessment).

== Examination ==
The subjects examined were Mathematics, English, Kiswahili, Social Studies and Religious Education (Christian/Islamic/Hindu) and Science. English and Kiswahili consisted of two parts, for English there was Grammar and Composition, and for Kiswahili, there was Lugha and Insha(Composition). Social Studies included a bit of Kenyan History, Civic education, current County system of government as well as all the Religious Studies. Deaf or hard of hearing students may choose to be tested in Kenyan Sign Language instead of Kiswahili. Each subject was worth a maximum of 100 marks. Each candidate was therefore able to earn a maximum of 500 marks. Usually, the exam time ran from the last week of October and takes three days. In 2016, the exams were held In October. Results were then announced by the Minister for Education sometime in November. Efforts were ongoing to scrap the KCPE exam. KCPE was eventually replaced by KJSEA (Kenya Junior Secondary Education Assessment.)

== Recent KCPE Results History ==
Note: Most years had multiple candidates attaining the same top score. Fields where data is not available are marked as "N/A".

Year	Registered	Total Sat	YoY Growth (%)	Boys	Girls	Gender Ratio	Special Needs	Top Scorer(s)	Marks	400+ Marks	Release Date	Source(s)
2000	N/A	N/A	N/A	N/A	N/A	N/A	N/A	Emily Achieng	N/A	N/A	N/A	N/A
2001	N/A	~509,076	N/A	261,934	247,142	51.5 : 48.5	N/A	Justine Justus	N/A	N/A	N/A	N/A
2002	N/A	N/A	N/A	N/A	N/A	N/A	N/A	Osiemo Deborah Mocheche	462	N/A	N/A	N/A
2003	N/A	~590,000	N/A	N/A	N/A	N/A	N/A	Marita Nyakundi Calvin	482	N/A	N/A	N/A
2004	N/A	N/A	N/A	N/A	N/A	N/A	N/A	Nyaosi Bugei Omete	472	N/A	N/A	N/A
2005	N/A	N/A	N/A	N/A	N/A	N/A	N/A	Oduor Fredrick Constant	461	N/A	N/A	N/A
2006	N/A	~660,555	N/A	350,134	310,421	53.0 : 47.0	N/A	Wamugi David Wanjuki	453	N/A	N/A	N/A
2007	N/A	N/A	N/A	N/A	N/A	N/A	N/A	Master Maina Aduor Solomon	455	N/A	N/A	N/A
2008	N/A	N/A	N/A	N/A	N/A	N/A	N/A	Mutinda Monica Wairimu	460	N/A	N/A	N/A
2009	N/A	N/A	N/A	N/A	N/A	N/A	N/A	Peter Kamenju Njoroge	438	N/A	N/A	N/A
2010	N/A	739,718	N/A	385,304	354,414	52.1 : 47.9	N/A	Ngatia Linus Muchiri	434	N/A	N/A	N/A
2011	N/A	775,829	+4.88%	N/A	N/A	N/A	N/A	Christine Muthoni Kagiri	442	5,800+	Dec 28, 2011	
2012	N/A	~811,879	N/A	N/A	N/A	51.2 : 48.9	N/A	Mwaura Boniface Kiongo	430	N/A	N/A	
2013	N/A	N/A	N/A	N/A	N/A	Near Parity	N/A	Otieno Akoth Daphne	444	N/A	Dec 31, 2013	N/A
2014	N/A	N/A	N/A	N/A	N/A	Near Parity	N/A	Tracy Okwach	441	N/A	Dec 29, 2014	N/A
2015	942,021	937,467	N/A	467,904	459,885	50.4 : 49.6	N/A	Aggrey Akhanyinya	449	7,560	Dec 30, 2015	N/A
2016	N/A	N/A	N/A	N/A	N/A	Near Parity	1,950	Victor Oduor Odhiambo	437	N/A	Dec 1, 2016	N/A
2017	N/A	1,003,446	N/A	503,527	499,919	50.2 : 49.8	2,066	Goldalyn Kakuya	455	9,846	Nov 21, 2017	N/A
2018	N/A	1,060,710	+5.71%	529,276	531,434	49.9 : 50.1	2,460	Rawlings Odhiambo	453	11,559	Nov 19, 2018	N/A
2019	N/A	1,088,989	+2.67%	546,370	542,619	50.2 : 49.8	2,394	Andy Michael Munyiri	440	9,673	Nov 18, 2019	N/A
2020	N/A	1,194,608	+9.70%	596,415	598,193	49.9 : 50.1	2,695	Mumo Faith Kwae	433	8,091	Apr 15, 2021	N/A
2021	N/A	1,214,031	+1.63%	N/A	N/A	Near Parity	N/A	Magata Bruce Makenzie	428	11,857	Mar 28, 2022	N/A
2022	N/A	1,233,852	+1.63%	N/A	N/A	Near Parity	N/A	Otieno Lewis Omondi	431	9,443	Dec 21, 2022	N/A
2023	1,415,315	1,406,557	+14.00%	721,544	685,017	51.3 : 48.7	3,456	Michael Warutere	428	8,525	Nov 23, 2023	N/A
