= St. Mary's School, Nairobi =

Roman Catholic primary school in Kenya

St. Mary's School

Location
- James Gichuru Road; Muthangari; Nairobi, 40580–00100; Kenya; 1°15′53.3″S 36°46′44.2″E

Information
- Type: Private day school
- Motto: Latin: Bonitas, Disciplina, Scientia (Goodness, Discipline, Knowledge)
- Denomination: Roman Catholicism
- Established: 1939; 87 years ago
- Founder: The Holy Ghost Fathers
- Sister school: Loreto Convent Msongari
- Oversight: Roman Catholic Archdiocese of Nairobi
- Principal: AG Gregory Sang
- Grades: 1-13
- Gender: Boys; Co-educational (IB only)
- Education system: KCPE; KCSE; IGCSE; IBDP
- Language: English; Swahili
- Campus type: Suburban
- Colours: Blue and white
- Nickname: Saints
- Website: www.stmarys.ac.ke

Saint Mary's School, commonly known as Saints, is a private Roman Catholic primary and secondary day school for boys located in Nairobi, Kenya.

Administered by the Roman Catholic Archdiocese of Nairobi, the school offers KCPE, CAIE, KCSE, IGCSE and IBDP certification. The school admits female students for the IB Diploma Programme.

The school's motto is "Bonitas, Disciplina, Scientia", which is Latin for "Goodness, Discipline, Knowledge".

== History ==
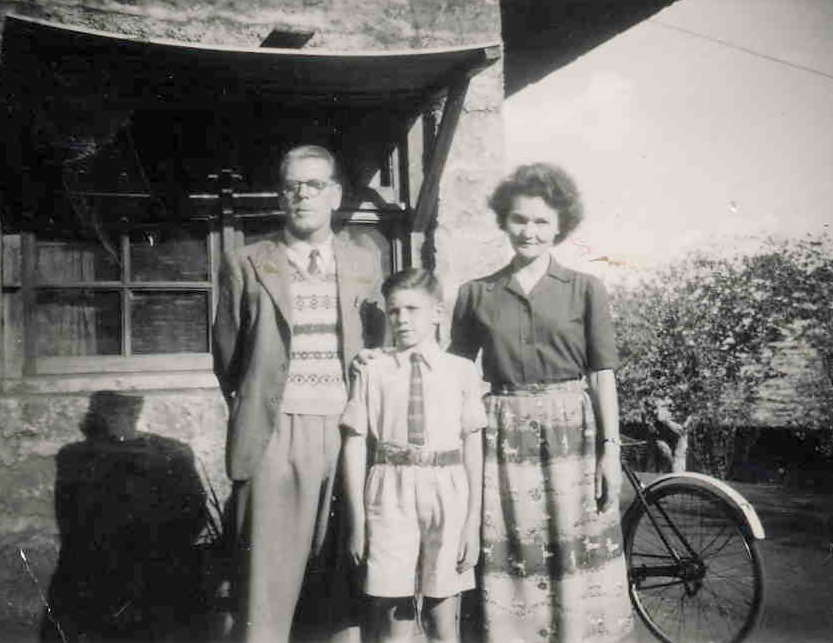
An early student of the school with his parents in 1949.

St. Mary's School was founded in 1939 in the Parklands area of Nairobi, from Blackrock College in Dublin, Ireland.

In September 1945, the school was moved to a temporary structure on an 34 hectares (85 acres) site on the land belonging to the St. Austin's Mission in the Muthangari area of Westlands. The present-day school buildings were completed in 1954, including the twin towers that stand at the school's quadrangle and the older St. Austin's Catholic Church, which sits beside the school's parking area. In between the towers is the staff room where teachers convene for meetings and take their breaks, which used to be the school's library.

== Present day ==
From the outset, Saints has always had a combined primary and secondary school. Although only boys are admitted to the primary and secondary schools, girls (along with boys) are admitted to the International Baccalaureate diploma course which is a post-O-level programme offered by the school since 1982. Entrants are chosen on the basis of their KCSE and IGCSE results. The school year runs from January to November.

The school is near its neighbouring sister school, Loreto Convent Msongari, separated only by a fence and a gate, and is situated approximately 1,000 metres (3,281 ft) away from its rival, Strathmore School.

Students are encouraged to participate in extra-curricular activities, which include sports, clubs, music and drama. All the school's sports teams are nicknamed "Saints", also the school's nickname.

=== Theatre ===
Since 1971, the school has been staging a musical every year, open to the general public. The musical week runs on specific dates from Tuesday to Saturday. The school has staged its own productions of famous plays such as The Mikado, The Yeomen of the Guard, The King and I, Joseph and the Amazing Technicolor Dreamcoat, The Sound of Music, Sarafina!, Cinderella, Oklahoma!, The Music Man, Ipi N'tombi, Aida, Zambezi Express, Amazing Grace (the musical).

Notable guests who have attended the school's shows in the past include former Prime Minister of Kenya Raila Odinga.

== Notable alumni ==
- Biko Adema, Kenyan rugby player
- Ian Duncan, Kenyan rally driver
- John Githongo, Kenyan anti-corruption journalist
- Muhoho Kenyatta, Kenyan businessman
- Uhuru Kenyatta, 4th President of Kenya
- Jeff Koinange, Kenyan journalist and news anchor
- Gideon Moi, former senator for Baringo County
- Lupita Nyong'o, Kenyan-Mexican actress and film director
- Andrea Sella, Italian chemist and broadcaster
- Mohammad Sheikh, Kenyan former international cricketer
- Eric Wainaina, Kenyan singer-songwriter
- Jimmy Wanjigi, Kenyan businessman
