= Kenya Certificate of Secondary Education =

Examination in Kenya

The Kenya Certificate of Secondary Education (KCSE) is an academic certificate awarded to candidates upon completion of secondary education in Kenya.

The first KCSE exam was held in 1989 at the same time as the last Kenya Advanced Certificate of Education (KACE), which it replaced as the entrance requirement for Kenyan universities.

In 1989, the KCSE included 10 subjects, but was later reviewed in 1992 and changed to 7 subjects under the presidency of Daniel arap Moi.

Group one (Compulsory subjects, 1989–2022; as from 2023 Mathematics and one language were compulsory)	Group two (Sciences)	Group three (Humanities)	Group four (Technicals)	Group five (Foreign Languages and Business)
English, Kiswahili, Mathematics	Biology, Physics, Chemistry	History and Government, Geography, Christian Religious Education, Islamic Religious Education and Hindu Religious Education	Home Science, Art and Design, Agriculture, Computer Studies, Aviation, Electricity, Power Mechanics and Woodwork	French, German, Arabic, Music and Business Studies

For grading, candidates must take all the three compulsory subjects, at least two sciences, one humanity and at least one practical or technical subject (see table above).

The KCSE examinations are taken under very strict supervision by the invigilators to avoid cheating and run for a period of about one month. Cheating in these examinations attracts severe penalties from the Kenya National Examination Council, and students caught cheating get their grades cancelled.

The exams usually start in early November and end in late November. During December, the exam is graded and the results are released in late December the same year. However, the dates and even months for the examination may change depending on various factors such as teachers' strikes and natural calamities such as Covid-19 which led to reshuffling of the academic calendar in all learning institutions in the country.

Examination results are announced to the public by the Cabinet Secretary for Education, and the top hundred students and schools are released to the media the day of the results announcement, online portals for checking results is also made available at that moment. School rankings are divided into the top 100 private schools, public schools and provincial schools.

The grading of the examination is as follows:

Grade	Agrregated points	Points
A	80-100	12
A-	75-79	11
B+	70-74	10
B	65-69	9
B-	60-64	8
C+	55-59	7
C	50-54	6
C-	45-49	5
D+	40-44	4
D	35-39	3
D-	30-34	2
E	0-29	1

In Kenya, this examination is the entrance qualification to public and private universities and the pass mark is grade C+. Students who attain a lower mark than C+ join other tertiary institutions for non-degree courses. Over time, stringent measures have been taken by the government to ensure and sustain the credibility of the KCSE examination. However, there have been instances of breaches of these measures leading to examination vices such as leakage to some selected students who if undetected end up scoring high grades. The ministry usually punish students caught in examination malpractices by cancelling their results, and they are also barred from sitting for another national exams for a period of three years, after which they will be allowed to sit for another K.C.S.E exams. Examination officials who participate in the cheating and leakaging of the exams questions are also charged in a court of law.

Each year, students complete the examination following a four-year Secondary School Course. This examination is used to determine career paths. Since 2018, specific grades have met the requirements for admission into public or private universities in the country, a criteria that differed for previous candidates.

== Impact of COVID-19 in 2020 ==
During the COVID-19 pandemic in 2020 and due to the surge in cases, the Cabinet Secretary for Education, Professor George Magoha, postponed the certificate examinations to 2021 for 800,000 Form 4 candidates. It was done in March 2021. This was the first time in the history of Kenyan education for the exams to be postponed and the academic calendar cancelled.

=== Transition to the Competency-Based Curriculum (CBC) ===
With Kenya's ongoing transition from the 8-4-4 system to the 2-6-3-3-3 Competency-Based Curriculum (CBC), the Kenya Certificate of Secondary Education (KCSE) is slated to be phased out. The historical first cohort of CBC learners completed Junior School (Grade 9) and sat for the Kenya Junior School Education Assessment (KJSEA), before transitioning into Senior School (Grade 10).

Upon completion of Grade 12 in Senior School, future cohorts will sit for the Kenya Senior Secondary Education Assessment (KSSEA) instead of the KCSE, marking the eventual end of the 8-4-4 secondary evaluation framework.

The final edition of the examinations will take place in late 2027.

== Summary of recent results ==
Year	Registered	Total Sat	YoY Growth (%)	Boys	Girls	Gender Ratio	Number of A Plains	University Qualifiers	Release Date	Source(s)
2000	182,805	—	—	—	—	—	—	40,491	—	
2001	196,439	194,883	6.61%	103,492	91,391	53.1:46.9	—	—	—	
2002	198,356	197,118	1.15%	105,202	91,916	53.4:46.6	—	42,721	—	
2003	207,730	205,832	4.42%	110,480	95,352	53.7:46.3	—	49,870	—	
2004	222,676	221,295	7.51%	119,643	101,652	54.1:45.9	—	58,239	—	
2005	260,665	259,219	17.14%	140,493	118,726	54.2:45.8	—	68,040	—	
2006	243,453	242,433	-6.48%	131,232	111,201	54.1:45.9	1,165	63,104	—	
2007	276,239	273,504	12.82%	148,817	124,687	54.4:45.6	822	82,134	March 2008	
2008	305,015	304,813	11.45%	166,664	138,149	54.7:45.3	817	72,590	March 2009	
2009	337,410	333,831	9.52%	183,865	149,966	55.1:44.9	973	81,048	March 2, 2010	
2010	357,488	354,834	6.29%	193,025	161,809	54.4:45.6	1,566	97,191	Feb 28, 2011	
2011	411,783	409,522	15.41%	221,703	187,819	54.1:45.9	1,930	119,658	Feb 29, 2012	
2012	436,349	432,443	5.60%	231,102	201,341	53.4:46.6	1,975	123,704	March 1, 2013	
2013	449,246	446,696	3.30%	243,604	203,092	54.5:45.5	2,727	123,365	March 3, 2014	
2014	485,547	483,630	8.27%	259,746	223,884	53.7:46.3	3,073	149,717	March 3, 2015	
2015	—	525,802	8.72%	—	—	—	2,685	—	March 3, 2016	
2016	—	~571,000	~8.59%	—	—	—	141	~88,929	Dec 29, 2016	
2017	615,773	611,952	7.17%	—	—	—	142	70,073	Dec 20, 2017	
2018	664,585	660,204	7.88%	341,089	319,115	51.7:48.3	315	90,377	Dec 21, 2018	
2019	699,745	697,222	5.61%	355,782	341,440	51.0:49.0	627	125,746	Dec 18, 2019	
2020	752,602	747,161	7.16%	381,114	366,047	51.0:49.0	893	143,140	May 10, 2021	
2021	830,854	826,807	10.66%	421,318	405,489	50.97:49.03	1,138	145,145	April 23, 2022	
2022	884,122	881,416	6.60%	443,644	437,772	50.34:49.66	1,146	173,345	Jan 20, 2023	
2023	903,138	899,453	2.05%	450,554	448,899	50.10:49.90	1,216	201,133	Jan 8, 2024	
2024	965,172	962,512	7.01%	480,310	482,202	49.90:50.10	1,693	246,391	Jan 9, 2025	
2025	995,860	993,226	3.19%	492,012	501,214	49.54:50.46	1,932	270,715	Jan 9, 2026	

== See also ==
- Joint Admissions Board of Kenya
- Kenya Certificate of Primary Education
- Kenya National Examination Council
