= Kenya High School =

The Kenya High School
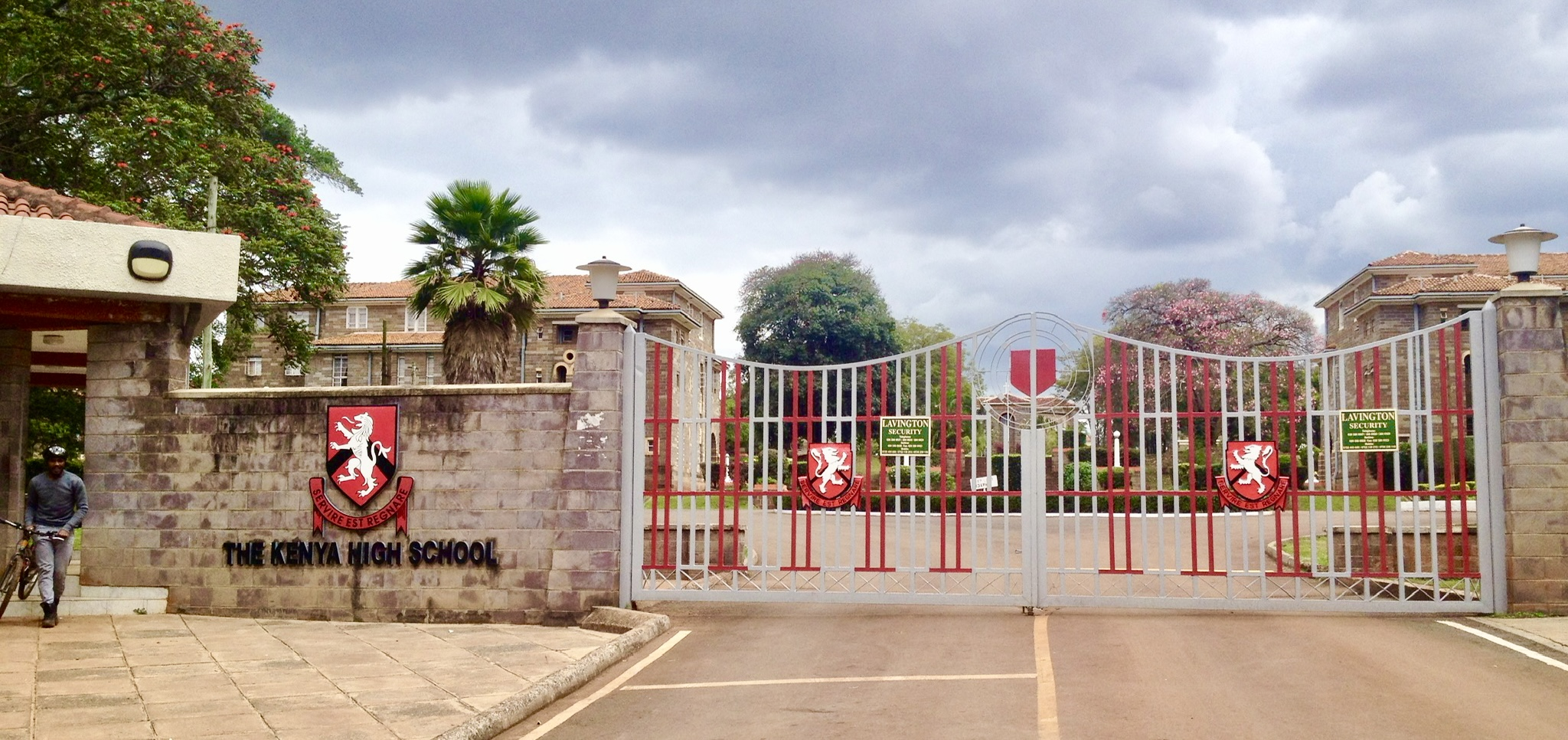

Location
- Kileleshwa, Nairobi; Kenya; 1°16′31″S 36°46′50″E

Information
- Former names: European School Nairobi & European Girls' Secondary School
- Type: Public national boarding school
- Motto: Servire est regnare (to serve is to reign)
- Established: 1910
- Founder: East Africa Protectorate Government
- Sister school: Nairobi School and Lenana School
- Principal: Rev. Edith Koech
- Gender: Female
- Colours: Red, grey, white and black
- Nickname: Boma
- Alumni: www.boma-alumnae.org
- Website: www.kenyahigh.ac.ke

The Kenya High School is a public girls' high school located on Mandera Road in Kileleshwa in Nairobi.

The school, which follows the national curriculum, is one of Kenya's 112 national schools and also one of the 18 prestigious Cluster III secondary schools. Located on a 150-acre campus some six Km from the Central Business District, the institution caters for (as of 2024) 2000 students who attend Forms 1–4 (= US grades 9–12) in seven to eleven streams, at the end of which the students sit for the Kenya Certificate of Secondary Education (KCSE) exams. (The student numbers and constitution shall change, once the 8-4-4 System is completely phased out and the three Senior School classes of the CBC System are fully operational. Class of 2027 is the last 8-4-4 cohort.)

Starting in the mid-1990s, the school became a primarily boarding school and accepts day-scholars only on a case-by-case basis. The Kenya High School consistently performs well in national secondary exams, and has enforced a strict code of conduct to be followed by all.

== Background and history ==
=== The Beginnings ===
Christian missions were the original providers of institutionalised education for African children in the East Africa Protectorate. Their stated purpose was to "civilise and convert the African". They also set up teacher training college-type institutions whose graduates went back to their villages as "evangelists" to "break the yoke of primitivity and usher in civilisation".

Formal institutional education via the colonial government began in October 1904, with the appointment of Alfred John Turner, of the Indian Educational Department, as Headmaster of the Railway School, Nairobi, which had been established in 1900 to serve the families of the I.B.E.A. Company. At that time there were few Europeans in the country, and formal education was only required for the children of European, Eurasian and Indian employees on the Uganda Railway.

The Railway School was taken over by the government in 1908. In 1910, the Board of Education proceeded to separate the provision for European, Indian, Arab and African education, and a separate European School was founded under Turner's headmastership, The European School, Nairobi (also cited as Nairobi European School). This co-education primary school marks the beginnings of Nairobi Primary School, The Kenya High School and Nairobi School formerly known as the Prince of Wales School. 1910 is considered the birth year of present-day The Kenya High School.

The school opened with 110 children and gradually increased the number until it obtained its maximum of about 250 children in 1918. It started in buildings on the former Police Barracks adjacent to Government House on Nairobi Hill, which is the location of the present-day Nairobi Primary School. About 130 boarders were accommodated in new buildings of timber and iron sheets two miles away, by the old Buller's camp next to Nairobi Club. By this time (1920) present Kenya had been transformed into The Colony and Protectorate of Kenya, a British Crown Colony.

The school's shield-and-lion crest was designed for the co-educational European School Nairobi in July 1926 by Michael William Alfred Berkley (born 9 April 1886 in Linton, Herefordshire, UK; died 5 September 1931 at Rua Ngonde Estate, Maragua).

In keeping with the colonial government's then commitment to improving institutional education (for Europeans) in Kenya, 25 acres (10 ha) of land on the Hill were allocated for new buildings. The architect, Sir Herbert Baker, drew up the design, and in 1928 a fine set of spacious new buildings was ready for occupation.

In 1930, when the colonial government initiated the classification of secondary schools, the European School Nairobi was the only one accorded this status in the whole country, while the rest of the schools remained primary and feeder schools.

=== Separation of Genders ===
In 1931 the genders at the school were separated. The secondary girls moved to the upper floor of the school, while using the Pillared Hall for assembly. The boys' secondary school was moved to a 600-acre allotment in the Kabete area (along Sclater's Road, today's Waiyaki Way), leaving the girls behind with the primary school pupils. The original idea for the name of the boys' school was Kabete Boys Secondary School, but the first headmaster, Captain Bertram William Lothian Nicholson, thought this to be too clumsy and therefore the name Prince of Wales School (now Nairobi School) was suggested and eventually adopted.

The first Headmistress of the girls' school, Miss G. H. Kerby, was appointed in 1931 (serving until 1942), with the school retaining the primary school's shield-and-lion crest.

Thus, 1931 was the actual beginning of the present (girls') Kenya High School and (boys') The Prince of Wales School.

Captain Nicholson - who had been the primary school's headmaster (1925-1930) - is credited as the originator of the girls' school's motto, Servire Est Regnare (To Serve Is To Reign / In Service is Perfect Freedom).

In 1935 the school was renamed The European Girls' School. The current name, The Kenya High School was officially registered in 1938.

Lenana School (established in 1949 as the Duke of York School) also credits its existence to the European School Nairobi, which was its feeder school.

=== The War Years ===
During World War II (1939-1945), European children were not immediately evacuated from Nairobi but when Italy entered the war in 1940, Nairobi boarders were sent upcountry. 100 Prince of Wales boys were sent to Naivasha, where they lived in Sparks Hotel (later known as the Lake Hotel), while the European Girls' School pupils went to Eldoret Hotel. The girls' school boarding block in Nairobi was turned over to the Women's Auxiliary Air Force (WAAFS), who erected extra corrugated iron buildings, while the Prince of Wales school became a military hospital.

However, day pupils were not evacuated, thus the Prince of Wales day boys had joint lessons with the day girls upstairs at European School Nairobi. The school was protected by barricades and sandbags. Following the defeat of the Italians, in the Christmas break at the end of 1941, all Prince of Wales pupils returned to their own buildings in Kabete. The girl boarders also returned to Nairobi, to their school on the top floor of Nairobi Primary School. Principal Kerby, a disciplinarian, forbade the girls to speak to their brothers while they shared the building. She was replaced in May 1942 by Miss Janette Stott (1942-1963), who was considered more approachable than Miss Kerby. Miss Stott got the girls to knit long white operation stockings for the troops.

=== Own Campus ===
In 1950 – while Miss Stott was Principal – 100 boarders moved into two boarding blocks of the partially completed new school on a 150-acre site in Kileleshwa, which had been constructed at an (for that time) astronomical cost of £700,000 (excluding the chapel, pool and library) through Miss Kerby's connection to colonial administrators. The school was modelled on the English public school and grammar school tradition.

=== Africanisation ===
A breakthrough was made in 1961 when the school (until then an exclusive European preserve) admitted two ethnic African and two ethnic Indian girls. The first ethnic African girls were Ann Wachira (née Mithamo) and Dr. Irene Eunice Gathinji (née Wagga), who were both Science students. Eunice joined Boma from Alliance Girls High School (AGHS) for her A-levels (Form 5 and Form 6), since AGHS at that time did not have sufficient lab provisions. Segregation was declared illegal on 1 June 1963, and the Kenyanisation of schools began in earnest after 1965 when the government set out nine objectives for education in Kenya. These included fostering a sense of nationhood and promoting national unity and serving all Kenyans without discrimination. This time also saw the admission of 120 ethnic African and 100 ethnic Indian girls. History was also made that year when the school selected the first ethnic African Deputy Headgirl, Hon. Ruth Waruhiu (née Githu).

It was during this Kenyanisation phase, with Miss A. A. Levers' as Principal (tenure: 1963 – 1967), that Dr. Pamela Ogot Kola joined the faculty on 1 May 1965 as the first ethnic African teacher, teaching English literature. Hon. Winifred Nyiva Mwendwa, who taught Domestic Science, was also employed at around this time.

Miss V. M. Barnes became Principal during a period of transition (serving 1968–1976). In 1974 the school was officially taken over by the government and it began to admit more African pupils and teachers.

The first ethnic African Headmistress, Rose Kariuki, served from January to July 1977, then handed over to Margaret Wanjohi. Wanjohi went on to lead the school until 1999, when she moved as Director of Starehe Girls' Centre, having been the longest-serving Principal at The Kenya High School. It was during Wanjohi's tenure that she was also promoted as the first female Principal of a Kenyan institution. Following the establishment of three Secondary School Principals’ grades in the 2018 Career Progression Guidelines by the Teachers Service Commission (TSC), the school's first headteacher to acquire the title of Chief Principal was Flora Mulatya (2016-2022).

=== "The Three" ===
As part of The Three, The Kenya High School is one of the oldest schools of the former East Africa Protectorate government's European Secondary Boarding Schools, coupled with Nairobi School (formerly Prince of Wales School) and Lenana School (formerly Duke of York School). Nairobi School has always been referred to as The Kenya High School's brother school, as the two schools have maintained a cordial rapport over the years by inviting each other to their school events and sports galas. The Kenya High School also enjoys a similar historical relationship with Lenana School. All three schools still retain some English traditions and infrastructure handed down from the colonial settler era.

== Admission and performance ==
As a national school, up to 2024 The Kenya High School admitted girls from across Kenya's 47 counties who had performed exceptionally well in the national Kenya Certificate of Primary Education (KCPE) examination. Annual enrollment has steadily increased over the years, from around 700 in the late 1980s/early 1990s to nearly 2000 as of 2024. The high numbers are a result of Kenya adopting the Policy on Universal Access to Basic Education, which seeks to ensure that all children enrol in primary school and complete their secondary school education with a 100% transition rate.

The Kenya High School has severally produced the top performing girl nationwide in KCSE:

- 1989 (inaugural KCSE cohort): Sylvia Waweru (under Principal Wanjohi)
- 1996: Vivian Doris Ashioya (under Principal Wanjohi)
- 1999: Grace Ikahu (under Principal Saina)
- 2001: Mary Kubo (under Principal Saina)
- 2008: Velma Mukhongo (under Principal Saina)

As one of the best public schools in the country, The Kenya High School consistently posts excellent results, often topping the national list of over 10,000 secondary schools:

- Number Two in KCSE 2016
- Number One in KCSE 2019 with 76 students scoring straight As
- Number Two in KCSE 2020 with 64 As
- Number Four in KSCE 2021 with 53 As
- Number Three in KCSE 2024 with 70 As

== Houses ==
There are ten boarding houses which were originally named after notable women in European history and are now mostly named after Kenyan geographical features and heritage sites. The houses, consisting of dormitories, cubicles and private rooms, are home to about 99% of these students for eight and a half months in a year. Although constructed to accommodate 50 girls, each of the houses currently hosts nearly 200 students; all from the four different class/form levels. The symmetrical architectural design of the school features two houses in each block except for the two in the middle (Nyali and Suswa), which are home to one house each. During the 7-4-2-3 era, Nyali and Suswa were home to students in Form 5 and Form 6 respectively. Each house originally had its own house colours, which were reflected in the members' sports kits and tie pins, but this was phased out sometime in the 1970s. However, the house emblems still adorn the front facade of each house. The area where the houses are located is known as down blocks by the students. The houses of residence are built next to each other in a semi-circular shape, clockwise from north-west to south-east as follows:

1. Tausi (formerly Huxley), together with
2. Sabaki (Kerby)
3. Chania (Beale), together with
4. Yala (Nightingale)
5. Nyali (Mortimer, named after Sir Charles Edward Mortimer, CBE, 1886-1974, who donated the first school gate)
6. Suswa (Mitchell)
7. Sagana (Hamilton), together with
8. Naivasha (Bronte)
9. Mara (Curie), together with
10. Baden-Powell has retained its name, and is often referred to by its acronym, BP

Phased out day-scholar houses include:

1. Tsavo (Samburu | Northcote)
2. Galana (Elgon | Darling)
3. Amboseli (Stott, named after the 2nd Principal)

There is a resident matron for every block (two boarding houses) except Nyali and Suswa, which each have their own matron. One of the matrons serves as the Head Matron. Matrons are generally responsible for welfare and disciplinary matters in their individual houses. Each house also has a House Mistress and a House Counsellor.

== Facilities ==
Tuition takes place "up-school" which consists of two rows of classrooms and some laboratories (junior and senior corridors). The two corridors are connected at the western tip by a quadrangle featuring of a lecture theatre and laboratories for biology, physics, chemistry and home science. The Computer Centre was later constructed behind the lecture theatre in 2009.

The school's own chapel, which was dedicated between the late 1950s and early 1960s, sits between the boarding houses and tuition blocks. With a two-level seating capacity, it houses a piano and a digital church organ. The chapel's western exterior walls are wooden sliding doors which can be opened up to accommodate an outside-seated congregation. It has a unique architectural design in the form of a cross when viewed aerially.

While dining was previously catered for in the old dining hall (currently used for class assemblies and other meetings), the school now has a modern kitchen and dining complex, whose foundation stone was laid by then President Uhuru Kenyatta in May 2018. This hospitality space was constructed with Ksh 7 million in government funds, was officially commissioned in 2020 and can seat 2,500 students.

There is also a well-stocked library, and a Science & Technology Centre was constructed (behind Senior Corridor's western tip) at a cost of Ksh 7 million.

Installed by the late 1960s, the Art Studio and Music Room contain spaces for visual and performing arts, with the Music Room having several practice rooms each equipped with a piano. The music teaching room has two pianos and several indigenous instruments.

The sanatorium (The San) is the school's sickbay, which has a clinic and wards for in-patient treatment. It is managed by two qualified personnel (nurses) on 12-hour shifts. Additionally, a physician is on call in the event of any complication to give directions and consultancy services to the students. Architecturally, the Lenana School sanatorium is interestingly a near-replica of The KHS one.

For sports, the campus is equipped with a 33-yard (≃ 30m) swimming pool, a gymnasium, several field hockey pitches and an athletics field ("top field"), as well as tennis, basketball, netball and volleyball courts. There is also a gymnasium next to the pool. The former lacrosse pitches fell into disrepair.

The school also has its own fish pond and farm with cattle and crops.

The Kenya High School is home to the country's first open-air theatre, The Oenone Theatre, named after a former student, Oenone Grellier (1922–1944) who died in a swimming accident.

Legend has it that, in recognition of the "grade-level wealth" encircled within its fences, the school came to be known and The Heifer Boma, later simply Boma, with the students gaining the nickname Bomarians. Another version tells that the school was affectionately known as a Boma (of heifers) in reference to a "herd" of young girls who needed to be kept safely out of predators' way.

== Architecture ==
Situated on Mandera Road off Gatundu Road in Kileleshwa, The Kenya High School is designed to a site plan resembling a mushroom, with the classrooms and administration block forming the stem and the dormitories forming the bloom. The chapel is centrally located symbolising God's important role in the school.

The buildings are constructed to an early modern design with chisel dressed stone walls under a half-round Spanish tiled roof. Floors are finished in a variety of terazzo, parquet and cement screed. Doors are made of highly polished timber panels while windows are glazed in steel casements.

Extra lighting is provided by fixed glazed casements held in arched frames with ornamental brick infilling and rose windows. Considering their age, the buildings and the school grounds are in an excellent state of repair and decoration.

== Clubs and Societies ==
Students are required to be members of and participate in co-curricular activities, with the following offerings being available:

Clubs & Societies at The Kenya High School
Arts & Languages	Sports
1. Drama	1. Netball
2. Choir	2. Hockey
3. Kiswahili	3. Badminton
4. German	4. Tennis
5. French	5. Football
6. Writers	6. Track & Field
–	7. Basketball
–	8. Swimming

== Governance ==
The Kenya High School has various levels of governance charged with managing the school.

- The Board of Management (BoM)
- The Administration
- The Matrons and Housemistresses
- The Students' Council
- The Parents Association (PA)

=== Board of Management ===
During Miss Barnes' tenure, the first ethnic African Chairman to the Board of Governors (BoG), Hon. Charles Njonjo, was appointed. The first woman to serve on the BoG was Eddah Gachukia (1984–1988), an ethnic African. Since renamed for all public schools, the current Board of Management (BoM) consists of the following members (starting September 2025:

- Skitter Wangeci Mbugua Ocharo, PhD, HSC (Chairperson)
- Edith M. A. Koech (Chief Principal/BoM Secretary as per law)

==== Board Chairpersons hitherto ====
- Sir Phillip Mitchell (1960-1963)
- J. G. Francis (1963-1965)
- Hon. Charles Njonjo (1966-1976)
- Geoffrey Kariithi (1977-1988)
- Eddah Gachukia, MBS (1984-1988) - first lady chairperson
- Margaret W. Kenyatta (1989-1996)
- Damaris Ayodo (1996-1999)
- Rebecca Masese (1999-2015) - also an alumna
- Philip G. Njuki (2015-2025) - Lay Canon of the All Saints' Cathedral Diocese
- Dr. Skitter Wangeci Mbugua Ocharo, PhD, HSC (September 2025 to date) - current CEC for Energy, Water and Environment & Natural Resources for Kisii County

=== Administration: Principals and Headteachers ===
The principals (the Chief and her deputies) execute the mandate of administration, with oversight by the BoM. As with most faculty members, the administrators are employed and assigned by, as well as registered with the Teachers Service Commission. Members of the Administration as at August 2025:

- Rev. Edith M. A. Koech (Chief Principal)
- Mrs. Lily C. Mosonik (Deputy Principal: Administrative Affairs)
- Mrs. Damaris Keli (Deputy Principal: Academic Affairs)
- Theophilus Kanuna (Director of Studies)

==== Principals and Headteachers Hitherto ====
- 1931 – 1942: Miss Grace H. Kerby
- May 1942 – 1963: Miss Janette A. M. Stott, OBE, second-longest serving Principal
- 1963 – 1967: Miss Adrienne A. Leevers (a former Liberal politician from Hornsey, UK)
- 1968 – 1976: Miss Vaudine Marguerite Barnes (1929 – 2006, daughter of Rev. L. A. Barnes of Wellington, New Zealand)
- 1st January – 21st July 1977: Rose Kariuki
- July 1977 – August 1999: Margaret W. Wanjohi, OGW HSC, longest serving Principal (later director of Starehe Girls' Centre)
- September 1999 – July 2015: Rosemary Saina, HSC (later member of the Kenya National Examinations Council KNEC) She had served for nine years as Wanjohi's deputy.
- August - December 2015: Lucy Mugendi, who had served as Saina's Deputy since January 2012. She moved on to head Machakos Girls High school.
- January 2016 – December 2022: Flora Mulatya, MBS OGW (from January 2023: Education Attaché in Canberra at Kenya's diplomatic mission to Australia)
- January 2023 to August 2025: Virginia Wahome, OGW (immediate former Chief Principal at Bishop Gatimu Ngandu Girls High School). Currently at Naivasha Girls Secondary School.
- From August 2025: Rev. Edith M. A. Koech (immediate former Chief Principal of Ossen Girls High School)

=== Matrons and Housemistresses ===
The Kenya High School employs a management system for the Boarding department. Houses of residence are managed by Matrons who are surrogate in-school mothers responsible for the students' welfare while downblocks in the Houses. Matrons answer to the Chief Principal who schedules regular meetings with them in order to receive updates on each student's behaviour and needs in the Houses. The Matrons ensure that laundry, cleanliness and gardening are accomplished in a timely fashion. It is also the Matrons' duty to maintain the good reputation and image that their Houses develop. There are six Matrons in charge of each of the four double-blocks and two single-blocks; the Matrons live in one of the flats attached to their respective boarding House.

Additionally, each House is assigned a female teacher who takes on the role of Housemistress. The Housemistress have a pastoral role and live on campus.

Both the Matrons and Housemistresses take pride in seeing their Houses awarded Merit Marks for inter-House activities, academic, sports, music, gardening, cleanliness and other competitions.

The last European Matrons who had departed by 1972 were:

- Jennifer Brenner – Huxley (now Tausi) House
- Anthony – Hamilton (now Sagana) House

The first ethnic African Matrons were:

- Wokabi
- Sarah Mbeere – Huxley (now Tausi) House
- Njahera
- Beatrice Kibinu – Kerby (now Sabaki) House, then Beale & Nightingale (now Chania & Yala) Houses
- Magdalena Wambui Nguri (from January 1972) – Hamilton (now Sagana) House, then Mitchell (now Suswa) House. By the time she retired in 1999 she held the position of Head Matron.

=== Student Council ===
As per the 2008 national reforms in the education sector to phase out the prefect-system, The Kenya High School has a Student Council (SC), whose members are elected from and by the student body, to enable participatory governance of the school, to represent students' views to the administration and to generally inculcate democratic and leadership skills. To address post-election violence and strikes in school, Kenya initiated peace clubs in secondary schools and supported the Ministry of Education (MoE) in developing a National School Council programme. MoE (2009), as cited by Kenya Secondary Schools Students’ Council (KSSSC, 2013), defines a Student Council as a representative body which acts as an avenue through which students in an institution of learning can be involved in the activities of the school, working in collaboration with school management, teachers, support staff and parents for the success and well-being of the school and the students.

The SC is headed by a President who takes on the role of what was previously an appointed Head of School (Head Girl). Other officials are: Deputy President (formerly Deputy Head of School) and the Secretary-General. In the Student Council, Upschool prefects (Blue Rags) are Cabinet Secretaries, whereas the ten Downblocks Blue Rags (Heads of Houses) are Principal Secretaries. All SC members are seniors and in their final year of secondary education (Form IV). Cabinet Secretaries include members for Games and Sports, Music, the Environment, Dining Hall, Library, Chapel, Health and Sanitation, Clubs and Societies, amongst others

Besides the matrons, disciplinary action in the houses of residence is up to the Heads of Houses and junior officials (Red Rags, in Form III).

Blue Rags wear navy blue ties and sweaters; Red Rags wear burgundy ties and sweaters. Other student officials include Form Captains who wear red ties.

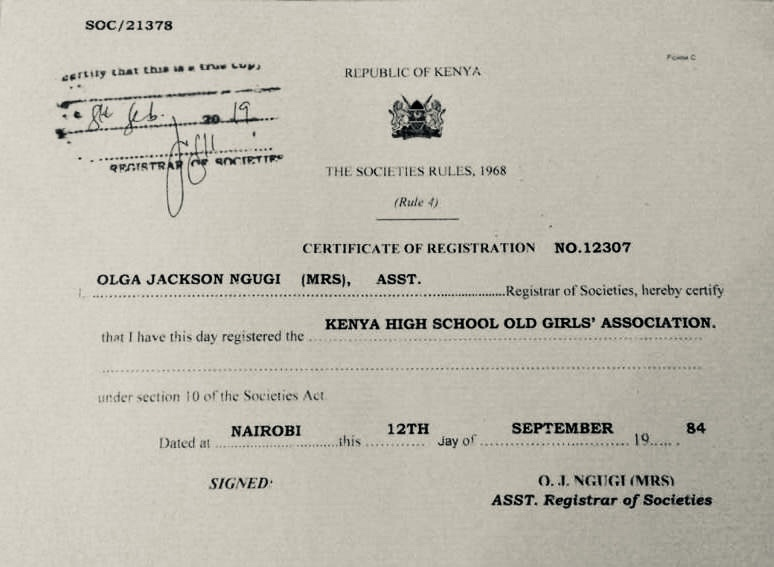
Certificate of Registration of the Kenya High School Old Girls' Association

== Notable alumni ==
- Esther Okenyuri Anyieni, Class of 2009: Nominated Senator in Kenya's 4th Senate in the 13th Parliament
- Esther Arunga: Kenyan-Australian lawyer and former broadcasting presenter
- June Arunga: Kenyan property rights lawyer
- Margaret Benyon: British holography artist
- Nancy Gathungu, MBS: Auditor-General of Kenya
- Nungari Evelyn Gitau, Class of 1993: Kenyan cellular immunologist at the African Academy of Sciences
- Philippa Namutebi Kabali-Kagwa: Ugandan author, and life and personal coach
- Judy Kibinge: Kenyan filmmaker, writer and producer
- Joyce Laboso: second Governor of Bomet County
- Hilary La Fontaine: British intelligence officer
- Jean La Fontaine, Class of 1949: British anthropologist and professor
- Susan Kidero-Mboya, Class of 1980/82: Kenyan corporate executive, philanthropist; daughter of Tom Mboya and wife of Dr. Evans Kidero
- Emma Miloyo-Naicca, Class of 1998: Kenyan architect, first female president of the Architectural Association of Kenya
- Wavinya Ndeti, Class of 1985/87, Chania House: Kenyan, second governor of Machakos County
- Christine Nicholls, Class of 1958/60: British author and former editor of the Dictionary of National Biography
- Njoki Susanna Ndung'u, Class of 1980/82: Kenyan associate justice of The Supreme Court of Kenya
- Esther Nyaiyaki: Kenyan lawyer and Judiciary Registrar
- Auma Rita Obama, Class of 1976/78: Kenyan-British community activist, sociologist, journalist, author and half-sister of Barack Obama
- Ruth Odinga, Class of 1979/81: Kenyan politician, County Woman Rep for Kisumu County in the National Assembly, and younger sister of Rt. Hon. Raila Odinga
- Amina Abdi Rabar, Class of 2006: Kenyan TV and radio presenter
- Daphne Sheldrick, Class of 1950: Kenya-British author, conservationist and expert in animal husbandry
- Soipan Tuiya, Class of 1998: Kenyan Cabinet Secretary for Defence

A number of Ivy League and Oxbridge graduates are alumnae of The Kenya High School, such as:

- Jean La Fontaine, Class of 1949 – Newnham College, University of Cambridge
- Christine Nicholls (née Metcalfe), Class of 1958/60, Yala/Nightingale House – University of Oxford
- Carol Musyoka (née Kimbo), Class of 1990, Tsavo/Samburu/Northcote House – Cornell Law School
- Adema Sangale, Class of 1992, Chania/Beale House – Harvard Kennedy School and Chevening scholar at University of Oxford
