= Beatrice Roseby Mwale =

Malawian politician

Beatrice Mwale
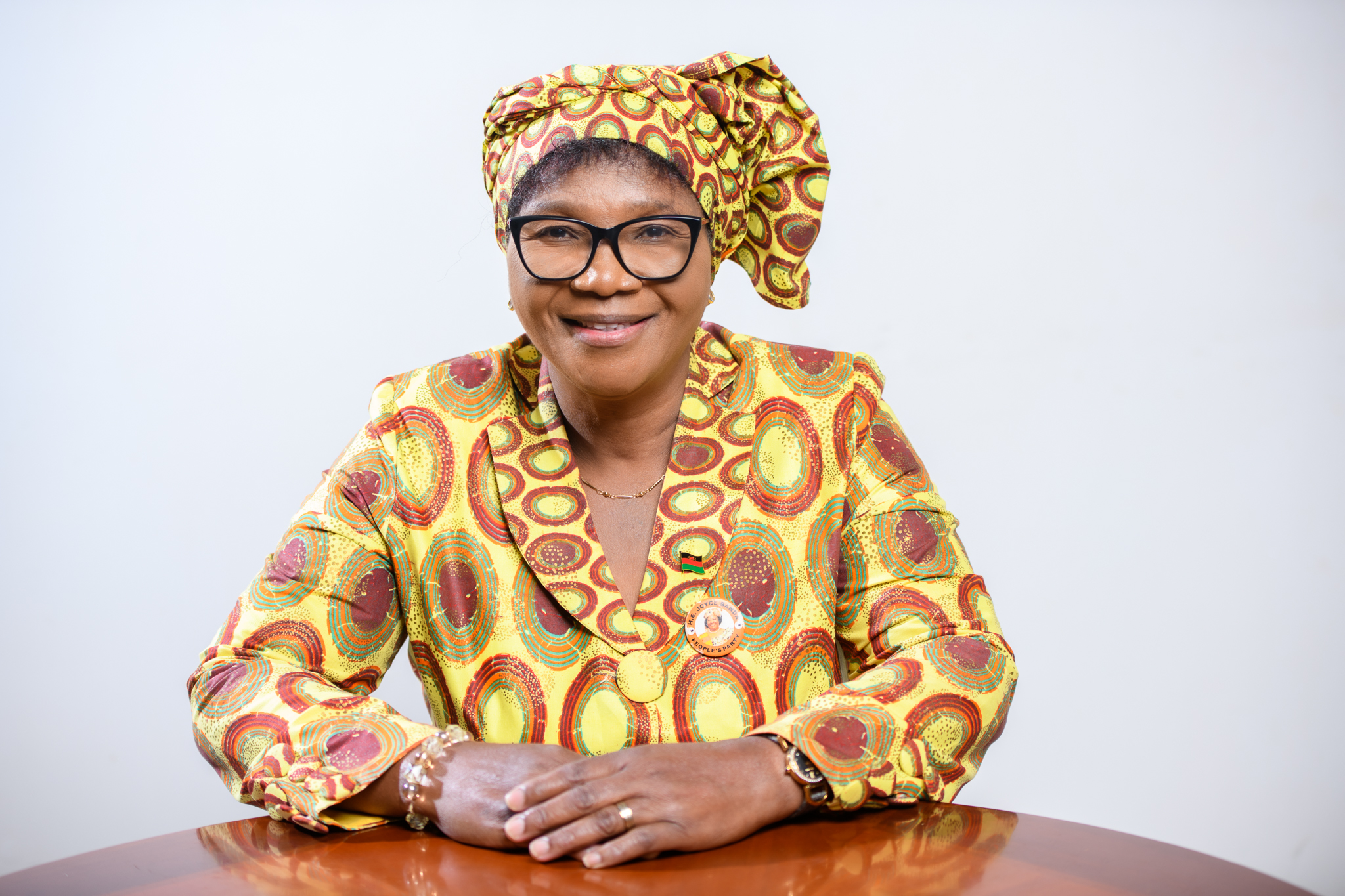
- in 2026
- Occupation: politician
- Known for: member of the National Assembly
- Political party: People's Party

'Beatrice Roseby Mwale is a Malawian politician who was an unsuccessful vice-Presidential candidate in 2009. She became the vice-President of the People's Party. She was elected in 2025 as a member of the National Assembly to represent the Kasungu North Constituency.

== Life ==
Mwale was an unsuccessful vice-Presidential candidate in 2009 when she was the running mate of Loveness Gondwe. He came fifth with less than 1% of the votes.

Mwale was elected in 2014 as a member of the National Assembly representing the Kasungu North constituency. In 2016 she was promoted to be the National Women's Director of the People's Party by its leader Joyce Banda. She replaced Clara Makungwa who had defected from Joyce Banda's party to join the DPP. Mwale was replaced by Edith Mithanga in 2018 when she was again promoted. This time she became a vice-President of the People's Party.

In 2018 the sports journalist Mike Bango decided to enter politics. He contested the MCP primaries in Mwale's constituency. In the 2019 election, Mike Bango won and Mwale came second.

Mwale was again elected in 2025 as a member of the National Assembly. She was still a member of the People's Party and she gained over 11,500 votes of the 26,000 votes cast in the Kasungu North constituency. In November 2025 the six members of the Parliamentary Service Commission were named. Sameer Suleman as speaker was the chair and Mwale was one of the commissioners. The commission's role includes identifying candidates for government related jobs.
