= Esther Okenyuri Anyieni =

Kenyan politician (born 1991)

- Nyaituga
- Born: February 18, 1991 (age 35)
- Education: The Kenya High School; Maasai Mara University
- Title: Nominated Senator
- Political party: United Democratic Alliance (UDA)
- Parents: Henry Anyieni Oketch (father); Lydia Nyachija Munema (mother)

Esther Okenyuri Anyieni (born February 18, 1991) commonly known as "Essy" and locally "Nyaituga" is a Member of Parliament at the 4th Senate of Kenya, / 13th Parliament of Kenya, nominated by Kenya's ruling party, United Democratic Alliance. She is a member of KEWOPA, the Vice Chairperson of the Senate Standing Committee on Trade, Industrialization and Tourism, a member of the Senate Standing Committee on Health, and the Senate Powers and Privileges Committee. She is the current Deputy Secretary General of the Kenya Young Parliamentarians Association, and the Organizing Secretary of Kenyan Women Senators Association. She is an Executive Member, Commonwealth Parliamentary Association (CPA) Kenya Branch.

Okenyuri was gazetted as a nominated Senator for Soipan Tuya, who was appointed by President William Ruto, EGH as the Ministry of Environment Cabinet Secretary.

== Early life ==
Esther Okenyuri Anyieni was born on February 18, 1991, in Kenyenya village in Bomachoge Borabu, in Kisii County to Henry Anyieni Oketch (1956–2006), a civil servant, and Lydia Nyachija Munema, a high school teacher.

She joined Tarang'aya Girls Primary School for her KCPE education before proceeding to The Kenya High School in 2006. She completed her secondary education in 2009 after sitting for the Kenya Certificate of Secondary Education. She graduated from Maasai Mara University with a BSc in Information sciences (Records management option) in 2015. She has completed Certified Public Accountant Part One from the Kisii College of Accountancy.

== Political career ==
Okenyuri was a student leader at the Maasai Mara University Students Organization. She was appointed by the then President Uhuru Kenyatta to head the youth wing of the Jubilee Party Campaigns in Kisii County during the re-election campaigns of the Jubilee Government in 2017.

Between 2017 and 2022, Esther Okenyuri Anyieni worked in the Strategy and Delivery Unit in the Office of the Deputy President as an Assistant Director of Research under the stewardship of Dr John Chikati now the Tongaren Constituency Member of Parliament. She was instrumental in setting up of Command/Call Centres for UDA by-elections that took place between 2017 and 2022 in Kabuchai, Matungu, Kiambaa, Msambweni and Bonchari constituencies.

Towards the 2022 presidential general elections, she founded Women for Ruto Organization, a women's movement that campaigned for the United Democratic Movement presidential candidate William Ruto, who was declared the winner of the 2022 elections by the Independent Electoral and Boundaries Commission.
