= Grand Challenges Canada =

Canadian nonprofit organization

- Formation: 2010; 16 years ago
- Type: Nonprofit organization
- Purpose: Global health, healthcare, international development
- Headquarters: Toronto, Ontario, Canada
- Region served: Worldwide
- Method: Grants; Venture capital Impact investing
- Key people: Karlee Silver, CEO; Guylaine Saucier, Chair, Board of Directors; Joseph Rotman, founding chairperson
- Website: grandchallenges.ca

Grand Challenges Canada (GCC) is a Canadian nonprofit organization that employs a Grand Challenges model with the aim to fund solutions for health and economic problems in low-and middle-income countries and Canada.

GCC is funded primarily by the Government of Canada and hosted in the MaRS Discovery District by the University Health Network in Toronto, Ontario.

== History ==
Grand Challenges Canada takes inspiration from the Grand Challenges in Global Health research initiative of the Bill & Melinda Gates Foundation. GCC was founded in 2010 by Peter A. Singer and Dr. Abdallah Daar.

The Canadian government committed C$225 million from the 2008 Canadian federal budget over five years to support the creation of GCC with the aim of addressing global health problems in low-income countries. The 2008 budget also created the Development Innovation Fund, which is administered by a consortium comprising GCC, the Canadian Institutes of Health Research, and the International Development Research Centre.

In June 2015, Global Affairs Canada announced an additional C$161 million in funding for the organization over ten years to support the government's Muskoka Initiative on Maternal, Newborn, and Child Health.

GCC has supported a number of inventions, including the Odon device, the Lucky Iron Fish, the Ovillanta, a Doppler fetal monitor that operates without electricity, an artificial knee joint, a sterile cover for hardware-store drills that transforms them into surgical instruments, a flocked swab to improve diarrhea diagnosis, a $5 safe-birth toolkit, a low-cost 3D-printed prosthetic hand, and a self-propelled powder to stop bleeding.

== Programs ==
GCC supports a number of global health programs and initiatives including:

- "Stars in Global Health," which provides seed funding for solutions to global health problems. Recipients of this award include Evelyn Gitau.
- "Saving Lives at Birth," which identifies and scales up disease prevention and treatment approaches for pregnant women and newborns. Saving Lives at Birth is a GCC partnership program with the United States Agency for International Development (USAID), the Government of Norway, the Bill & Melinda Gates Foundation, the United Kingdom Department for International Development (DFID), and the Korea International Cooperation Agency (KOICA).
- "Saving Brains," which supports protecting and nurturing early brain development to provide a long-term exit strategy from poverty. Saving Brains is a GCC partnership program with Aga Khan Foundation Canada, Bernard van Leer Foundation, Bill & Melinda Gates Foundation, The ELMA Foundation, Grand Challenges Ethiopia, Maria Cecilia Souto Vidigal Foundation, Palix Foundation, UBS Optimus Foundation, and World Vision Canada.
- The Indigenous Innovation Initiative (I3) supports First Nations, Inuit, and Métis Canadians to "improve all life through Indigenous innovation." Sara Wolfe is the director.
- "Global Mental Health," which supports the development of models that can expand access to mental health care and increase the effectiveness of mental health services. Through Global Mental Health, the Canadian government is funding some of the world's largest research projects on global mental health.
- "Transition to Scale," which brings innovations forward from proof-of-concept. Using venture philanthropy and impact investing models, the program supports the further development of validated ideas in the pipelines of GCC or its partners such as the Skoll Foundation and the Bill & Melinda Gates Foundation.
- Serving as an anchor investor in the Global Health Investment Fund, a US$108 million fund for financing late-stage global health technologies. Other investors and partners include the Bill & Melinda Gates Foundation, JPMorgan Chase, the Swedish International Development Cooperation Agency, the International Finance Corporation, GlaxoSmithKline, Merck, Pfizer, the German Federal Ministry of Economic Cooperation and Development, the Children's Investment Fund Foundation, AXA, and Storebrand.
- The Every Woman Every Child (EWEC) Innovation Marketplace, launched in September 2015 by the Global Strategy for Women's and Children's Health as part of the United Nations Every Woman Every Child movement. The EWEC Innovation Marketplace brokers GCC's Transition to Scale investments in reproductive, maternal, newborn, child, and adolescent health.
- Creating Hope in Conflict: A Humanitarian Grand Challenge, launched in February 2018 with funding from USAID's Office of U.S. Foreign Disaster Assistance (OFDA), the United Kingdom's DFID, and the Netherlands' Ministry of Foreign Affairs. The program funds innovations that may help people affected by armed conflict or humanitarian crises. The first grand challenge awarded up to US$250,000 to each of the 23 finalists.

== Governance ==
GCC is governed by a Board of Directors including members from various sectors, including health, finance, and international development. The Board oversees GCC operations and impact and ensures that GCC activities align with the GCC mission and strategic goals. GCC is also guided by Scientific Advisory Board.
