= The Flame Trees of Thika =

- Directed by: Roy Ward Baker
- Written by: John Hawkesworth; Elspeth Huxley (novel)
- Produced by: John Hawkesworth; Verity Lambert; Christopher Neame
- Starring: Hayley Mills; Holly Aird; David Robb; Ben Cross; Mick Chege; Sharon Maughan (credited as Sharon Mughan); Nicholas Jones; Steve Mwenesi; John Nettleton; Carol MacReady
- Cinematography: Ian Wilson
- Edited by: Ralph Sheldon; Ann Chegwidden
- Music by: Alan Blaikley; Ken Howard; Zack Laurence
- Distributed by: Euston Films
- Release date: 1981 (UK)
- Running time: seven 50-min episodes
- Country: United Kingdom
- Language: English

The Flame Trees of Thika is a British television serial of seven 50-minute episodes made by Euston Films for Thames Television in 1981. It was adapted by John Hawkesworth from the 1959 book of the same title by Elspeth Huxley, and is set in and around the town of Thika in Kenya's Central Province. The story deals with the lives of British settlers in this part of East Africa in 1913, when the country was a British colony, up to the start of World War One.

The series stars Hayley Mills (in her first starring role after a six-year performing hiatus), Holly Aird, David Robb and Ben Cross.

== Plot ==
Robin Grant (David Robb), his wife Tilly (Hayley Mills) and daughter Elspeth (Holly Aird) move to British East Africa (now called Kenya) to set up a coffee plantation. They meet Piet Roos (Morgan Sheppard), a Boer big game hunter, and Njombo, a local person, who goes to work for them. The Grants face many travails in getting established, but these improve after they hire another local person, Sammy, as the headman of the plantation.

Hereward (Nicholas Jones) and Lettice Palmer (Sharon Maughan) move to the area. There is a fight between Roos and Sammy. Then Njombo kills Kimon, who was the Palmers' headman. As a result, the colonial government local administrator (titled as a "chief") strips him of his property, and Sammy marries the girl Njombo wanted.

While her parents and the Palmers are on a trip to Nairobi, Elspeth has a New Year's Eve party with Mrs. Nimmo, who tends to the area's medical needs, and a newcomer to the area, Alec Wilson.

A horse trader and safari leader, Ian Crawford (Ben Cross), arrives in the area. He is infatuated with Lettice Palmer, who gives a pony to Elspeth. We learn Lettice left her first husband to elope with Hereward. Elspeth develops an intense dislike for Hereward Palmer after he shoots a baby antelope on a hunt.

Sammy arranges for a curse to be put on Njombo, and it literally takes an “Act of God” to get it lifted.

After the railway reaches Thika, Lettice gets a piano, but during a party held to celebrate its arrival, a leopard kills one of her dogs. During the hunt to get it, Hereward kills the leopard but is almost killed by its mate; he is saved by Roos.

The Palmers, Tilly, and Crawford go on a safari, during which Lettice and Crawford have an affair. Hereward and Crawford are about to have a brawl when Crawford's servant stabs Hereward. As a result, Crawford leaves and Lettice stays with Hereward.

On 4 August 1914, the Grants learn war has been declared on Germany. Robin joins the army, while Tilly becomes a nurse and Elspeth goes to school, where she is bullied for being a know-it-all. She runs away back to Thika. Ian Crawford is killed in the war. Robin is transferred to France so all the Grants leave Africa and return to Europe for the duration.

== Production ==
The Flame Trees of Thika was filmed on location in Kenya, directed by Roy Ward Baker and produced by Hawkesworth and Christopher Neame with Verity Lambert as executive producer. The filming included aerial views of the actual Kenya-Uganda railway train as it traveled between Mombasa and Nairobi heading toward Uganda.

The television series was nominated for three BAFTA Television Awards, including Ian Wilson for Best Cinematography.

It was originally transmitted on the ITV network from 1 September to 13 October 1981. Baker says it was very popular. It inspired the song Flame Trees by Cold Chisel.

It is available on DVD.

== See also ==
- Red Strangers - a related novel by Elspeth Huxley.
- Out of Africa - book which begins in the same period in British East Africa.
