= Grand Challenges in Global Health =

Research initiative

The Grand Challenges in Global Health (GCGH) is a research initiative launched by the Bill & Melinda Gates Foundation in search of solutions to health problems in the developing world. Fifteen challenges are categorized in groups among seven stated goals plus an eighth group for family health. The disciplines involved include immunology, microbiology, genetics, molecular biology and cellular biology, entomology, agricultural sciences, clinical sciences, epidemiology, population and behavioral sciences, ecology, and evolutionary biology.

== The Grand Challenges ==
Goal 1: Improve Vaccines

- Grand Challenge #1: Create Effective Single-Dose Vaccines that Can be used Soon After Birth

Potential benefits of this challenge include increased effectiveness of immunization, decreased cost of immunization systems, and decreased deaths in early childhood. One project to combat this challenge that is currently underway is the development of a live recombinant attenuated salmonella anti-pneumococcal vaccine for newborns, which is being investigated by Dr. Roy Curtiss III at Arizona State University.

- Grand Challenge #2: Prepare Vaccines that Do Not Require Refrigeration

Potential benefits include increased efficacy of immunization systems as well as reduced cost of vaccine delivery. Dr. Abraham L. Sonenschein and his team at Tufts University School of Medicine are currently working to develop childhood vaccines for diphtheria, tetanus, and pertussis that can endure a wide range of temperatures with the encapsulation of heat-resistant bacterial spores.

- Grand Challenge #3: Develop Needle-Free Delivery Systems for Vaccines

Potential benefits include improved access and compliance and the avoidance of infection from the re-use of needles. Dr. James R. Baker and a team at the University of Michigan are working on a way of preparing vaccines that can be given as nasal drops, eliminating the need for preservatives or refrigeration.

Goal 2: Create New Vaccines

- Grand Challenge #4: Devise Reliable Tests in Model Systems to Evaluate Live-attenuated Vaccines

The priority areas for this challenge are viruses refractory to vaccine development, pathogenic bacteria, and complex pathogens such as protozoa and fungi. Dr. Hongkui Deng of Peking University in China is currently working with his colleagues to create mouse models with immune systems and livers that are similar enough to humans to allow testing of potential HIV and HCV vaccines.

- Grand Challenge #5: Solve How to Design Antigens for Effective, Protective immunity

The priority areas for this challenge involve HIV and malaria. Dr. Ralph Steinman and his team are currently developing vaccines that stimulate the immune system’s dendritic cells, which are known to help protect against infectious diseases.

- Grand Challenge #6: Learn Which Immunological Responses Provide Protective immunity

A potential benefit of this challenge is the establishment of new diagnostic and prognostic tools for assessing public health. Dr. Patrick E. Duffy’s team at the Seattle Biomedical Research Institute is currently attempting to identify the antibodies and other immunological responses that help protect children from death due to malaria.

Goal 3: Control Insect Vectors

- Grand Challenge #7: Develop a Genetic Strategy to Deplete or Incapacitate a Disease-transmitting Insect Population

The priority areas for this challenge include malaria, dengue, and other tropical arboviral diseases. Dr. Scott O’Neill of the University of Queensland in Australia is attempting to modify mosquito population age structure in order to eliminate dengue transmission.

- Grand Challenge #8: Develop a Chemical Strategy to Deplete or Incapacitate a Disease-transmitting Insect Population

The hope with this challenge is that this challenge will effectively disrupt the diseases transmission cycle. At Virginia Tech University, Dr. Jeffery Bloomquist and a team are using molecular modeling and a new chemical synthesis method known as “click chemistry” to produce insecticides targeted to the primary malaria vector mosquitoes, Anopheles gambiae.

Goal 4: Improve Nutrition

- Grand Challenge #9: Create a Full Range of Optimal, Bioavailable Nutrients in a Single Staple Plant Species

To improve nutrition, this grand challenge focuses on iron, zinc, and selenium deficiencies. At Ohio State University, Dr. Richard Sayre is leading a team of scientists to create nutritious cassava for sub-Saharan Africa.

Goal 5: Limit Drug Resistance

- Grand Challenge #10: Discover Drugs and Delivery Systems that Minimize the Likelihood of Drug Resistant Micro-organisms

This challenge focuses on TB, Malaria, and HIV. Potential benefits include reduced treatment failures and simple treatment regimens. Dr. Brett Finlay and a team at the University of British Columbia are investigating new therapeutics that boost innate immunity to treat infectious diseases.

Goal 6: Cure Infection

- Grand Challenge #11: Create Therapies that Can Cure Latent Infection

This challenge focuses on HIV, HBV, Herpes, TB, Schistosomiasis, and Toxoplasmosis. Dr. Douglas Young of the Imperial College in London is leading researchers from the U.K, U.S., Singapore, Korea, and Mexico to further expose the biology of latency and then develop drugs against latent TB.

- Grand Challenge #12: Create Immunological Methods that Can Cure Latent Infection

This challenge focuses on similar priority areas as Challenge #11, and Dr. Robert Garcea and a group of researchers from the University of Colorado School of Medicine are working to identify the best protein candidate for a therapeutic vaccine that will target HPV infection.

Goal 7: Measure Health Status

- Grand Challenge #13: Develop Technologies that Permit Quantitative Assessment of Population Health

Potential benefits include a standardized global system for assessing the status of population health as well as accurate assessment of injury, disease prevalence, and incidence. Dr. Christopher Murray and international investigators are working to develop ways to assess and measure mortality.

- Grand Challenge #14: Develop Technologies that Allow Assessment of Individuals for Multiple Conditions or Pathogens at Point of Care

A potential benefit of this challenge is the rapid detection and diagnoses of disease exposure. At Northwestern University, Dr. David Kelso’s team is trying to develop rapid and affordable point-of-care systems.

Two additional challenges for family health were announced in 2011.

- Discover New Ways to Achieve Health Growth

A potential benefit of this challenge might lead to new methods of aiding the development of prevention of intrauterine growth restriction (IUGR), stunting, and wasting of newborns and infants in the developing world.

- Preventing Preterm Birth

Potential benefits of this initiative could lead to low-cost technologies that reduce the global problem of prematurity.

== History ==
In January 2003, Bill Gates first announced the Grand Challenges in Global Health at the World Economic Forum in Davos, Switzerland. In partnership with the National Institutes of Health (NIH), the Bill & Melinda Gates Foundation (BMFG) granted $200 million to the Foundation for the National Institutes of Health (FNIH). The goal behind the initiative was to fund research to advance the fight against disease that disproportionately affects people in the world's poorest countries. At this time the scientific board's responsibilities were outlined: to identify scientific or technological innovations that have a global impact or show potential for feasibility.

In May 2003, the scientific board publicly advertised for ideas. Over a thousand suggestions from scientists and institutions in 75 countries were submitted by July. The scientific board met to further discuss these proposals, which were presented orally with a statement of the problem, descriptions of obstacles to progress, the challenge itself, and a discussion of potential benefits and priority areas for study and application. The following questions raised during the meetings reflect the difficulty in defining these Grand Challenges:

- Does the proposal describe a difficult and discrete roadblock to progress?
- What is the likelihood that creative solutions are required and that grant proposals worthy of funding will be received to address it?
- Is there already substantial scientific activity aimed at solving the problem, which would make the intent of a grand challenge redundant?
- What are possible impacts on various diseases if the challenge is successfully met?
- Will envisioned advances be suitable for implementation in poorer parts of the world?

In October 2003, the scientific board announced fourteen Grand Challenges.

In August 2004, the evaluation of letters from around the world led to over 400 full proposals. Experts assessed proposals and the Executive Committee of the scientific board and staff members from FNIH and BMGF reviewed the projects to move into the negotiations for grants.

In May 2005, The Bill & Melinda Gates Foundation gave an additional $250 million to fund research for the initiative, bringing the foundation's commitment to $450 million.

In June 2005, the initiative announced grants for 43 new projects, attracting international partners.

Grants for challenges 15 and 16 (in family health) were awarded in 2012.

In February 2015, GCGH and the Global Health Innovative Technology Fund (GHIT) partnered to launch Target Research Platform to invest up to ¥100 million (US$1 million) for early stage development and approximately ¥200 million (US$2 million) in Grand Challenges grant investments per year. Successful projects will then move into GHIT's regular investment program.

== Explorations ==
Launched in 2008, Grand Challenges Explorations, promotes invention in global health research. As of October 2022, the foundation has awarded 3622 grants to researchers in 117 different countries. Some grantees are pursuing radioactivity to kill infected cells, others are trying to develop a waterless toilet that is cost efficient as well as environmentally productive.

The Explorations grant initiative requires two short page applications but no preliminary data. Applications are submitted online. Initial grants of $100,000 are awarded two times a year. Successful projects have the opportunity to receive a follow-on grant of up to $1 million and could eventually evolve into Grand Challenges project.

== Ethical, social, and cultural issues ==
The key challenge associated with such large-scale research projects called for by the initiative is the addressing of ethical, social, and cultural (ESC) issues related to the Grand Challenges. Dr. Peter A. Singer and Dr. James Lavery and a team of colleagues are employing projects to address these barriers, but for the GCGH initiative to be successful, compliance and collaboration with this concept is absolutely critical.

=== Project goal ===
The Ethical, Social, and Cultural Program of the Grand Challenges in Global Health, launched in 2005, is targeted to address the ethical, social, and cultural issues that may arise as a result of the initiative - either in the development of the research itself, or in the implementation of knowledge and technology by the communities in need. The GCGH ESC program is the first significant science project concentrated entirely on ESC issues linked to the developing world. ESC issues can have a series of consequences that involve new technologies and approaches: rejection of safety precautions or genetically modified foods, for example, because of culture sensitivity or perceived health, environmental, or economic risks. The ESC program assumes that science and technology are essential to global health development, but the appropriate development of this technology requires attention to the accompanying ethical, social and cultural issues. The program aims to link ESC activities with the research projects and to include voices from the developing world within these projects. Its two main goals are (1) to provide an advisory service for GCGH projects and (2) to create a research program to facilitate appropriate adoption in the long-term. The Bill & Melinda Gates Foundation granted money in November 2005 for the program to be carried out. The program is described and discussed at length in a series of four articles published in PLoS Medicine.

In defining ESC issues, the program's creators underwent a process of document analysis, group discussions with investigators and program staff, and interviews with experts from the developing world. The findings include thirteen issues that include: community engagement, public engagement, cultural acceptability, gender, post-trail obligations/benefit sharing, collaboration, the involvement of civil society organizations, affordability, accessibility, regulatory issues, collection, management, and storage of tissue samples, corruption and poor governance, and unintended consequences.

The ESC advisory service was created to address ESC issues identified at the start of GCGH research projects, as well as challenges encountered as projects progress. An advisory service co-leader and a lead bioethicist are assigned to each GCGH project. During the initial phase of communication, the co-leader and lead bioethicist define the issues and develop a strategy for addressing the challenge's issues based on their specific expertise. A process of consultation with the GCGH program officers has also been implemented to help identify issues within the challenges and its individual projects. The program officers often join the advisory service conference calls and offer expertise and insights that help anticipate ESC concerns.

=== Research program ===
The goal of the research program is to provide knowledge in order to facilitate the successful adoption of technology by GCGH's targeted communities. With working papers, working groups, global case studies, and demonstration projects on public engagement, research enhances the ESC expertise with respect to specific goals of the Grand Challenges.

== Criticism ==
As is the case with most health initiatives, the GCGH have been subject to a fair degree of criticism.

A very widely circulated critique was published in 2005 in The Lancet. In the column, Anne-Emanuelle Birn, Sc.D., an associate professor of Public Health Sciences at the University of Toronto, described the initiative's role as "weak" for focusing too narrowly on the power of science and neglecting the importance of economic, social, and political factors. She cites the 20th century cultural obsession with technological advancement as one that cannot ignore the need to redistribute economic and social resources within impoverished communities. She suggests that rather than trying to finance, develop and distribute new and existing vaccines, a more sustainable effort might focus on public support for a universal, accessible public health system. She references Goal #4, which involves improved nutrition, as a specific challenge that is shortsighted and "overlooks key distributional questions". She explains that because malnutrition and famine are not the result of technical obstacles, but rather, political and economic ones, technology is not the answer. These issues are not about supply or the lack of nutritional value available in foods, but rather, poor income distribution and market shifts leading to populations unable to afford food.

Laurie Garrett, in her article published in Foreign Affairs, says the main problem in global health was lack of resources but with the input of private players such as Bill and Melinda Gates, there has been a major contribution to pressing health issues such as HIV, Malaria, TB and others. Although these contributions are useful, they also highlight specific diseases which are more high-profile or research that may fascinate the public. The BMGF initiative may have provided funds for improving health care but this is not enough to improve public health, as education and an all-disease health system are needed.
