= Christine Nicholls =

English author and editor (born 1943)

Christine Stephanie Nicholls
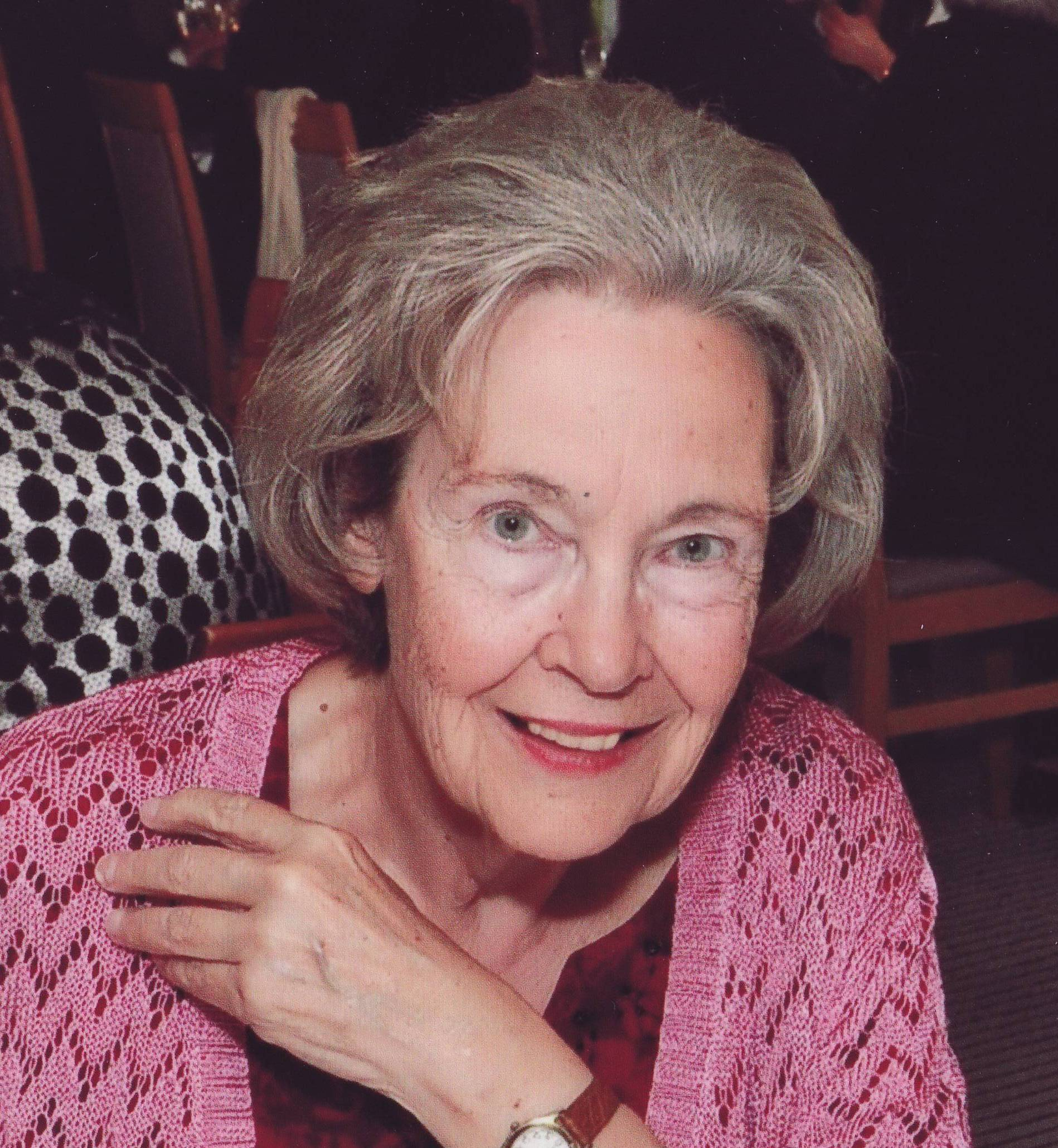
- Born: Christine Stephanie Metcalfe; January 23, 1943 (age 83); England
- Education: The Kenya High School
- Alma mater: Lady Margaret Hall, Oxford; St Antony's College, Oxford
- Occupations: Author, editor
- Years active: 1971–2011
- Employer: Oxford University Press (former)
- Known for: Editor of the Dictionary of National Biography
- Notable work: Elspeth Huxley: A Biography, Red Strangers: The White Tribe of Kenya

Christine Stephanie Nicholls, née Metcalfe, (born 23 January 1943) is an author and former editor of the Dictionary of National Biography. She spent her childhood in Kenya. Now retired, she lives in Oxford, England.

== Early life ==
Nicholls was born in England and accompanied her parents to Kenya in 1947. She moved around Kenya as her father took a series of teaching posts until he was employed permanently at Mombasa Primary School in 1954. At this time Nicholls was a boarder at The Kenya High School in Nairobi, which she attended from 1953 to 1958.

== Career ==
In 1961 Nicholls went to Lady Margaret Hall, in Oxford University where she received her MA. She then attended St Antony's College and received her D.Phil. Following her university education she was employed at the Institute of Commonwealth Studies at London University as a research fellow. She later worked as a freelance researcher for the BBC Arabic department.

Nicholls joined Oxford University Press in 1977 as Assistant Editor of the Dictionary of National Biography. She later became the editor and produced 5 volumes from 1981 to 1986. She has also written a number of other factual books under the name of C.S. Nicholls.

== Works ==
- 1971 The Swahili Coast: Politics, Diplomacy and Trade on the East African Littoral, (Allen & Unwin) ISBN 978-0841900998
- 1981 Dictionary of Biography 1961–1970, with E.T. Williams (Oxford University Press) ISBN 978-0198652076
- 1986 Dictionary of Biography 1971–1980, with Lord Blake(Oxford University Press) ISBN 978-0198652083
- 1990 Dictionary of Biography 1981–1985, with Lord Blake (Oxford University Press) ISBN 978-0198652106
- 1996 Dictionary of Biography 1986–1990, (Oxford University Press) ISBN 978-0198652120
- 1993 Dictionary of National Biography–Missing Persons, (Oxford University Press) ISBN 978-0198652113
- 1990 Power: A Political History, (Harrup, OUP and various) ISBN 978-0195207934
- 1985 Cataract, (with Philip Awdry) (Faber & Faber) ISBN 9780571134786
- 1996 Hutchinson Encyclopedia of Biography (Helicon) ISBN 978-1859861578
- 1998 David Livingstone, (Sutton Publications) ISBN 978-0750915915 Written as part of a biographical series which Nicholls edited.
- 2000 A History of St Anthony’s College 1950–2000, (Macmillan) ISBN 978-0333791837
- 2002 Elspeth Huxley: A Biography, (HarperCollins) (Thomas Dunne Books in USA). ISBN 9780007292042
- 2005 Red Strangers: The White Tribe of Kenya, (Timewell Press) ISBN 978-1857252064
- 2011 A Kenya Childhood, (blurb.com)
