= Philippa Namutebi Kabali-Kagwa =

- Born: Philippa Namutebi Kabali-Kagwa; 1964 (age 61–62); Kampala, Uganda
- Occupation: Writer
- Writing career
- Genres: Fiction, poetry
- Notable works: Flame and Song (2016)
- Website: namutebikabalikagwa.com

Philippa Namutebi Kabali-Kagwa (born 1964) is a Ugandan author, a life and personal coach, living in Cape Town, South Africa. She spoke at TEDxTableMountain and TEDxPrinceAlbert in 2012. Her memoir, Flame and Song, was published in 2016.

== Childhood and Education ==
Philippa was born in Kampala, Uganda, in 1964. She is the youngest daughter of Ugandan poet Christopher Henry Muwanga Barlow and Fayce Lois Watsemwa Barlow (née Kutosi). She went to Nakasero Primary School, and then Gayaza High School. Her family left Uganda to live in Ethiopia when Archbishop Luwum was killed. She then joined The Kenya High School where she did both her "O" and "A" levels. She joined Makerere University and spent a year as an occasional student in the department of Music, Dance and Drama. In 1984 she joined Kenyatta University to pursue a Degree in Education. She graduated in 1987 with B.ED Hons in Music and Literature.

== Published works ==
=== Memoir ===
- Flame and Song: A memoir. Modjaji Books. 2016. ISBN 978-1928215219.

=== Children's books ===
- Katiiti's song. Bookdash. 2016.
- Mkhulu and Me. Cambridge University Press. 2009. ISBN 978-0521741804.
- Kea Goes To School. Cambridge University Press. 2009. ISBN 978-0521741491.
- Tyres and Tubes. Cambridge University Press. 2009. ISBN 978-0521742238.

=== Short stories ===
- "How to tell your story" in Nancy Richards, Carol du Toit, ed. (2015). Being a Woman in Cape Town: Telling Your Story. Woman Zone Cape Town. ISBN 9780994662767.

=== Poetry ===
- "At the gates of Mulago I, II and II" and "Death of an Archbishop" in Patricia Schonstein, ed. (2013). Africa Ablaze! poems and prose pieces of war and civil conflict selected. Africa Sun Press. ISBN 9781874915195.
- "Velvet Skies" in Patricia Schonstein, ed. (2012). Africa! My Africa!: an anthology of poems selected. Sun Press.
- "Destiny" and "Serenade" in A. D. Amateshe, ed. (1988). An anthology of East African Poetry. Longman. ISBN 978-0582895225.
- "To you my friend" in Waveney Olembo, ed. (1986). The Music of Poetry: Poems from Africa, the Caribbean and elsewhere.
