= Esther Arunga =

Lawyer and Kenyan politician

Esther Adongo Arunga
- Born: Esther Adongo Arunga; Kenya
- Other names: Esther Timberlake, Chryslertte Provydence Timberlake
- Education: University of Wollongong, Kenya School of Law, Kenya High School
- Occupations: Barrister, Solicitor, Television and Radio Presenter (former)
- Years active: 2000s–2010s
- Known for: Co-founder of PlaCenta Party (Platinum Centralizer and Unionist Party), former TV/Radio presenter
- Notable work: 98.4 Capital FM, Kenya Television Network
- Spouse: Quincy Timberlake
- Awards: 2008 CHAT Award for Best Teen TV Anchor/Presenter

Esther Adongo Arunga, also known as Esther Timberlake, is a barrister, solicitor, and a former television and radio presenter from Kenya, who now resides in Australia. She is married to Quincy Timberlake and is a co-founder of the PlaCenta Party (Platinum Centralizer and Unionist Party of Kenya).

== Early life and education ==
Esther Arunga has a twin brother and six other siblings. She was raised a Seventh-day Adventist. She was educated at Kenya High School, earned Bachelor's degrees in communication and law from the University of Wollongong in New South Wales, returned to Kenya for a one-year degree course at the Kenya School of Law and was admitted to the bar in Nairobi in 2009.

== Broadcasting ==
She worked as an announcer and journalist at 98.4 Capital FM in Nairobi and for the Kenya Television Network. She won the 2008 CHAT Award for best Teen TV Anchor/Presenter.

== Church, politics and marriage ==
In 2009 Arunga joined the Finger of God Church started by Joseph Hellon, a distant relative. She became engaged to Wilson Malaba, an elder of the church, but in early 2010 called off the engagement and moved out of her parents' house to live in a church-owned mansion with Hellon and a number of other church members. She has since said that her parents wanted to marry her to a politician in the government. That February, she, Hellon, and Quincy Timberlake announced the formation of the PlaCenta Party (Platinum Centralizer and Unionist Party) of Kenya and Hellon's candidacy for the presidency and Arunga's for the seat of Karachuonyo Constituency and the deputy presidency. Arunga resigned from her job as a news anchor at Kenya Television Network the same day. That night, a number of people associated with the church, including Arunga and Hellon, were arrested and charged with running an unregistered association, although the church had been registered five years before. Computers and laptops were destroyed, documents confiscated and vehicles impounded. She and Timberlake both say they were isolated and tortured. She announced lawsuits against her parents, psychiatrist Dr. Frank Njenga who allegedly forcefully aborted her baby under political orders, the Attorney General, and the Kenya Police for wrongful imprisonment and torture. Arunga was released after two days and on 3 March 2010 married Quincy Timberlake while he was still in custody; however, she has since stated that Hellon performed the ceremony at another time.

== Australia ==
Feeling unsafe, the Timberlakes left Kenya, and by way of Dubai went to Australia, where as of July 2012, she is a barrister at the New South Wales Supreme Court and has acquired citizenship. She has announced that she will run for office in Kenya, and that she would be accepting an offer from Al Jazeera to co-host a features show.

In June 2014, the elder of the couple's two sons died after an apparent accident at their home. In September of that year her husband was charged with the murder of the child, to which he subsequently pleaded not guilty in court. Esther Timberlake was later charged as an accessory and was released on bail. She gave new evidence that her husband had used healing techniques on the boy and had pressed his stomach repeatedly and thrown him against a wall. She is reported to have changed her name to Chryslertte Provydence Timberlake. In 2016 she was reported to have been working somewhere in Australia.
