= Margaret Benyon =

British artist (1940-2016)

Margaret Benyon MBE
- Born: 29 April 1940; Birmingham, England
- Died: 21 October 2016 (aged 76); Sydney, New South Wales, Australia
- Education: Slade School of Fine Art; Royal College of Art
- Known for: Pioneer in the artistic use of holography

Margaret Benyon, MBE, was a British artist. Trained as a painter, she was one of the first artists to use holography as a medium and had her first solo show of holograms in 1969. She was appointed to the Order of the British Empire in 2000 for her services to art and has been called "the mother of British holography".

== Education and early career ==
Margaret Benyon was born in Birmingham, England in 1940 and grew up in Kenya, where she attended The Kenya High School. She studied painting at the Slade School of Fine Art in London, graduating in 1962. As a working artist in the early 1960s she sought to "question the abstract expressionists' assumption that the criterion of excellence in painting was that it should be treated as a flat surface". She employed techniques including "optical illusions, colour and so on", particularly the moiré pattern, "to modulate the picture plane so that it no longer looked flat". She also created anaglyph paintings, which appeared three dimensional when viewed through special glasses with differently coloured lenses.

== Career in holography ==
Benyon became interested in holography after reading a newspaper article about it in 1967. From 1968 to 1971 she held a fellowship in fine art at the University of Nottingham, where she began experimenting with holography as an artistic medium. Building on her already existing knowledge of photographic processing techniques, she taught herself holography by reading scientific journal articles. She was given after-hours use of a laboratory in the university's mechanical engineering department, where she made her first holograms.

In 1969 the University of Nottingham art gallery displayed Benyon's holograms in what has been called the world's "first solo art holography show". She made the holograms for the show in a laboratory of the British Aircraft Corporation in Bristol, England. She later made use of the facilities at the National Physical Laboratory. In February and March 1970 Benyon had a solo show at the Lisson Gallery in London. The exhibition poster described it as the "first London expo of holograms and stereoscopic paintings".

From 1971 to 1973 was a Leverhulme Senior Art fellow in the Department of Architecture and Building Science at the University of Strathclyde in Glasgow. During this period she had two more exhibitions in Nottingham and one in Edinburgh.

Benyon spent the period between 1976 and 1981 in Australia. She taught at the Canberra School of Art and held a creative arts fellowship at the Australian National University in Canberra. Working in laboratories at the university's physics department and the Royal Military College in Duntroon, she continued creating holographic works. Some of her Australian work incorporated other media, such as drawing and painting.

After her return to England in 1981 Benyon began working with pulse lasers in collaboration with scientist John Webster at the Central Electricity Generating Board. In 1983 she set up her own holography studio in Dorset, England. In the period between 1981 and 1993 she used the human body as the sole subject matter for her work, combining holography with techniques such as underpainting.

Margaret Benyon earned a PhD from the Royal College of Art for a thesis entitled How is Holography Art? in 1994. She was appointed to the Order of the British Empire in 2000 "for services to art". Benyon has been called "the mother of British holography".

Margaret Benyon returned to Australia in 2005. She continued to practice as an artist, while teaching at the College of Fine Arts at the University of New South Wales in Sydney. She died on 21 October 2016.
