= Global Health Innovative Technology Fund =

Nonprofit organization in Tokyo, Japan

The Global Health Innovative Technology Fund (GHIT Fund), headquartered in Japan, is an international public-private partnership between the Government of Japan (Ministry of Foreign Affairs and Ministry of Health, Labour and Welfare), 16 pharmaceutical and diagnostics companies (Astellas, Chugai, Eisai, Daiichi Sankyo, Fujifilm, GlaxoSmithKline, Johnson & Johnson, Kyowa Hakko Kirin, Merck Group, Mitsubishi Tanabe, Nipro, Otsuka, Shionogi, Sumitomo Dainippon, Sysmex and Takeda), the Bill & Melinda Gates Foundation, the Wellcome Trust and United Nations Development Programme. It funds scientific research and development for anti-infectives and diagnostics for diseases that primarily affect the developing world. Bill Gates has noted that "GHIT draws on the immense innovation capacity of Japan’s pharmaceutical companies, universities and research institutions to accelerate the creation of new vaccines, drugs and diagnostic tools for global health." Margaret Chan, former Director-General of the World Health Organization, said: "The GHIT Fund has stepped in to provide that incentive in a pioneering model of partnership that brings Japanese innovation, investment and leadership to the global fight against infectious disease."

The GHIT Fund is the first public-private partnership fund to involve a national government, a UN agency, a consortium of pharmaceutical and diagnostics companies, and international philanthropic foundations.

The public-private partnership model, the inclusion of a whole pharmaceutical sector and the structure of individual research projects across sectors and national boundaries are all aimed at reducing the R&D risk to any one entity and ensuring that findings are open to all. Another key opportunity the GHIT Fund has created has been to help open the doors of Japan’s public and private drug compound libraries to product development partnerships, which makes possible the screening of tens of thousands of drug candidates for potential new treatments.

The participating companies view their investments into neglected diseases through the Fund as a long-term investment into the future, rather than charity. They see the Fund as a necessary catalyst for having allowed them to pursue this line of research.

By 2022 (the end of the Fund’s second five-year phase), GHIT aims to bring two of its projects to a stage where a request for regulatory approval is filed. One of the products in the pipeline and among the closest to hitting the market is a pediatric formulation of praziquantel, a drug widely used to schistosomiasis, a disease caused by parasitic flatworms.

== Conceptualization and establishment ==
The idea of a Japanese nonprofit focused on global health R&D was conceived during a conversation between Tachi Yamada and a former executive at Eisai Co. Ltd., BT Slingsby – the fund's first CEO and founder of GHIT. A launch committee was set up in 2012 among the Government of Japan's Ministry of Foreign Affairs and Ministry of Health, Labour and Welfare, Astellas, Daiichi Sankyo, Eisai, Shionogi, Takeda, the Bill & Melinda Gates Foundation. This committee worked collectively to design the organization based on the idea that new investment and innovation are needed to address some of the world’s most neglected diseases and that Japan – a leader in health technologies innovation – could be doing more in the global fight against infectious diseases. The launch committee also designed the unique governance model to minimize potential conflicts of interest in investment decision-making. In 2013, the GHIT Fund formally launched with an initial commitment of over US$100 million. Original Board members included Kiyoshi Kurokawa, Peter Piot, Ann Veneman, and Ko-Yung Tung.

== Vision and mission ==
In their own words, the vision of the founders of the GHIT Fund is “one in which the crushing burden of infectious disease no longer prevents billions of people in the developing world from seeking the level of prosperity and longevity now common in the industrialized world”.

The Fund’s stated mission is “to facilitate international partnerships that enable Japanese technology, innovations, and insights to play a more direct role in reducing disparities in health between the rich and the poor of the world.”

In keeping with this vision and mission, global health R&D is considered to be indispensable to the realization of universal health coverage (UHC), for which Japan is a major proponent.

== Investment approach ==
The GHIT Fund invests across four research platforms (Target Research, Screening, Hit-to-Lead, and Product Development) in R&D partnerships among Japanese pharmaceutical companies and research institutes and universities with non-Japanese research institutes and universities. This gives researchers around the world access to Japanese expertise and investment. The Fund deliberately refers to grants as "investments" and grantees as "development partners."

Investments go to R&D projects that aim to develop new health technologies for infectious diseases. Diseases targeted by the Fund include HIV, malaria, tuberculosis, and neglected tropical diseases. The Fund also works with established product development partnerships such as the Global Alliance for Tuberculosis Drug Development (TB Alliance), Medicines for Malaria Venture, and Geneva-based Drugs for Neglected Diseases initiative to screen the large number of potential drug candidates residing in private and public sector chemical compound libraries in Japan.

The GHIT Fund utilizes private-sector standards for product development (e.g., using typical milestones and stage gates for timeline management). GHIT invests heavily in the management and evaluation of projects and is rigorous about achievement milestones, swiftly terminating non-performers. But while GHIT has a “private-sector” orientation to the management of investments, there is no expectation of financial return.

Co-funding of projects is another key investment management tool. Candidate products that have achieved proof-of-concept (POC) are required to have a co-funding strategy in place, though GHIT strongly encourages co-funding for the entire portfolio. In December 2017 GHIT announced a partnership with the European & Developing Countries Clinical Trials Partnership (EDCTP) to support product development research, specifically by co-funding the PZQ4PSAC phase III clinical study, which is sponsored by Merck KGaA and conducted by the Pediatric Praziquantel Consortium. This study provides clinical data and support for registration of a new praziquantel (PZQ) tablet formulation to treat schistosomiasis in preschool-aged children. The GHIT Fund's full investment portfolio, with detailed background on specific development partnerships, is on its website.

== Funding for GHIT ==
In 2013, the original partners to the Fund initially committed over US$100 million over 5 years. Half came from the two Japanese ministries, and the other half came from Japanese pharma Astellas, Eisai, Daiichi Sankyo, Shionogi, and Takeda together with the Bill & Melinda Gates Foundation.

By 2015, funding for GHIT increased to US$140 million with the addition of new partners and sponsors. New partners Chugai, Sysmex, and the Wellcome Trust had joined. The Wellcome Trust alone brought in an additional approximately US$4.6 million through January 2017. Three additional companies (All Nippon Airways, law firm Morrison Foerster LLP, and Yahoo!Japan) joined the Fund as sponsors in the summer of 2015 to provide in-kind services in support of the Fund’s work. Yahoo!Japan has co-launched a special joint website with the Fund: “Save millions of lives from infectious diseases”.

A replenishment for the GHIT's second five-year phase was initiated in May 2016 as the Government of Japan announced as part of a G7 Summit communique a US$130 million contribution to the GHIT Fund/UNDP. On June 1, 2017 GHIT announced it had secured commitments of over US$200 million for its next phase of work, allowing it to move the most advanced tools out of the lab, and into the hands of those who need them most. The new commitment for GHIT’s second phase is double the initial US$100 million investment GHIT received when it was created in 2013. Also in June 2016 ten companies joined GHIT, including a full funding partnership with FUJIFILM Corporation, an associate partnership with Otsuka Pharmaceutical, affiliate partnerships with GlaxoSmithKline, Johnson & Johnson, Kyowa Hakko Kirin, Merck, Mitsubishi Tanabe Pharma Corporation, Nipro Corporation, Sumitomo Dainippon Pharma, and sponsorship from Salesforce.com.

There are currently three levels of pharmaceutical and diagnostic partners - Full partners, Associate partners, and Affiliate partners. Additionally, non-biopharmaceutical companies engage as Sponsors, contributing in-kind services to reduce the overhead expenses of the Fund.

== Impact ==
GHIT’s Phase 2.0 strategic plan anticipates that by the end of FY2022 two products in its pipeline will be approved by a stringent regulatory authority. As of December 2017 GHIT has invested over of US$115 million across four research platforms into more than 60 global product development partnerships that leverage Japanese innovation and capacities in pharmaceuticals. Seven of the 24 novel screening programs have advanced into next stage of development; six candidates have successfully achieved first-in-human trials, and two projects have achieved Proof of Concept (Phase II). Approximately 42% of GHIT’s investments have been allocated to projects related to malaria, 13% to tuberculosis, and the rest to NTDs. With regard to product type, 71% of investments have been in drugs, 24% in vaccines, and the rest in diagnostics.

Products resulting from research must be appropriate, effective, affordable, and accessible for the poorest of the poor. In fact, all grant investment proposals must prioritize open innovation and guarantee that products will be developed on a "no gain, no loss" basis, meaning in the poorest countries drugs will be licensed without royalties, while in others, they will be licensed at cost.

== Leadership & Governance ==
GHIT is governed and managed by an international Board of Directors. The Board is responsible for establishing the organization’s by-laws, providing fiduciary oversight, approving investment recommendations from the Selection Committee, and assessing the Fund’s overall performance. Dr. Kiyoshi Kurokawa is Chair of the Board and Dr. BT Slingsby is the founding CEO and Executive Director.

GHIT’s Selection Committee operates separately from the Board of Directors. This is to ensure objectivity, transparency, and accountability of the investment-making and evaluation process. The Selection Committee consists of renowned experts in product development for infectious diseases from across the globe and evaluates proposals, and development partner reports, and recommends the provision of GHIT’s investments to the Board. To add another layer of accountability and scientific rigour, External Reviewers consisting of more than 100 global health experts from around the world provide independent reviews of R&D proposals to the GHIT Fund and its Selection Committee. To further preemptively counter any potential conflicts of interest, all Selection Committee members, including academicians, must declare that they have no relation to proposal applicants or abstain from any decision-making process in the instance when they may.

GHIT’s Council, which includes participating pharmaceutical companies and government and international funding entities, provides oversight for the Board of Directors and advocates for GHIT’s mission. Council members are never involved in operational and/or funding decisions.

An additional level of organization can be at the individual member level; for instance, Dave Stevenson is the COO and Managing Director of the Merck contributing unit.
