= Hilary La Fontaine =

Kenyan-born British intelligence officer

- Born: Hilary Dawn La Fontaine; 19 October 1937; Nyeri, Kenya
- Died: 24 September 2012 (aged 74); Sydenham, London, England
- Education: Kenya High School for Girls
- Occupation(s): Intelligence officer secretary
- Years active: 1962–2000

Hilary Dawn La Fontaine (19 October 1937 – 24 September 2012) was a Kenyan-born British intelligence officer and secretary for the Secret Intelligence Service (SIS). The daughter of an army officer and colonial civil servant, she was educated in Kenya before moving to England to train as a secretary. La Fontaine joined the SIS in 1967 and undertook her first missions in Africa. She became the personal assistant to the chief of the service in 1974 and later transferred to the SIS's department at the centre of the Cold War to support its operations behind the Iron Curtain. La Fontaine accepted a posting at the British Embassy in Hanoi six years later, becoming the sole regular Western source in Communist Vietnam. She returned to London in 1982 to the posting of the SIS's secretarial branch and retired in 1994 to take up her hobbies and two academical posts.

== Biography ==
=== Early life and ancestry ===
La Fontaine was born on 19 October 1937 in Nyeri, Kenya. She was the youngest of three children of army officer and colonial civil servant, Sydney Hubert La Fontaine, and Honor Kathleen Milton. Sydney fought in both world wars, serving in East Africa during World War I and was stationed in Egypt during World War II.

La Fontaine's ancestors were a Huguenot family who had fled to Great Britain following the Edict of Fontainebleau in 1685. They joined the Levant Company shortly afterwards and settled in Constantinople in the 18th century. The family continued to maintain British citizenship and educated their children in England. These historical events may have led to La Fontaine developing a restless sense of adventure. She was educated at The Kenya High School in Nairobi, Kenya.

=== Career ===
La Fontaine travelled to England to train as a secretary. In 1962, she flew to Kinshasa (formerly Léopoldville) to join her sister, Jean, and her husband, John Sackur of the Secret Intelligence Service (SIS), to assist them in a research project. She found herself on the same aircraft months later when it was chartered for the head of the Congolese Security Services, Victor Nendaka Bika. La Fontaine discovered that the plane was being used to ferry crates of gold bars.

La Fontaine formally joined the SIS in 1967 as a secretary, and used to say the first thought of joining the services originated from a conversation during her Congolese mission five years earlier. When she joined the service, it was small and thinly spread with most posts being occupied by a (male) officer with support from a (female) secretary. The method of communication was by Morse code and "book and pad cipher", requiring staff to have self-reliance and resourcefulness. Although the SIS was male-dominated, there was a strong mutual trust that largely ignored age and rank and stemmed from undertaking lonely and demanding jobs, in which the full responsibility went to secretaries.

La Fontaine's first two missions in Africa included meeting, debriefing and managing clandestine agents. In the Oxford Dictionary of National Biography, Gerald Williams wrote that she had "the right qualities for a role that called for intelligence, common sense, self-reliance, and the ability to impart confidence to those whose safety depended on her", making her "a good field operator."

La Fontaine became the personal assistant to the chief of the service in 1974 and learned about the extent of the SIS's activities. She felt she discovered her niche after a series of unsatisfactory jobs in London and Nairobi and the service agreed. This led to the service to judge La Fontaine's performance as outstanding and she was awarded the MBE in 1976, a rare distinction in the service. She was transferred to the department at the centre of the SIS's activities in the Cold War in support of its difficult and dangerous operations behind the Iron Curtain.

=== Later career, retirement, and death ===
La Fontaine was promoted in 1980 and accepted a post at the British Embassy in Hanoi. She was the sole regular source of Western intelligence inside Communist Vietnam and carried heavy responsibility. Her presence in Vietnam was hugely important to the Central Intelligence Agency (CIA) which greatly valued her reporting and insights; the agency acknowledged her activities by awarding her the Meritorious Service Medal from the American people, a distinction normally reserved for CIA members.

Upon returning to London in 1982, La Fontaine became the head of the SIS's secretarial branch. She gained influence through her directness and humanity, and undertook appointments in personnel management, moving up the ladder to attain the rank of under-secretary.

La Fontaine graduated from the Open University in 1983 with a Bachelor's degree in humanities. In 1994, she retired and moved to Camberwell, where she pursued her interests in animal welfare, children's education, and history. From 1995 and 2000, she served as the chair of governors of John Donne Primary School in Peckham and also worked on the history of the Special Operations Executive as a research assistant.

La Fontaine died of cancer at St Christopher's Hospice in Sydenham on 24 September 2012. She was unmarried. Her funeral was attended by many local people along with former SIS colleagues.
