= Kasungu North Constituency =

Malawian electoral constituency

Kasungu North
- First-past-the-post constituency for the Parliament of Malawi
- District: Kasungu
- Region: Central Region
- Major settlements: Santhe

Current constituency
- Party: People's Party
- Member: Beatrice Roseby Mwale

Kasungu North Constituency is a constituency for the National Assembly of Malawi, located in the Kasungu District of Malawi's Central Region.

It is one of several constituencies in Kasungu District. It elects one Member of Parliament by the first past the post system. The constituency has multiple wards, all electing councilors for the Kasungu District Council. The constituency was represented by MP Mike Bango of the MCP for one term. Otherwise it has been Beatrice Roseby Mwale from 2014.

== Members of parliament ==
MP	Party	Notes	References
2014	Beatrice Roseby Mwale	People's Party	Multi-party system
2019	Mike Bango	MCP	Multi-party system
2025	Beatrice Roseby Mwale	People's Party	Multi-party system
