= Evelyn Gitau =

Cellular immunologist

- Gitau In 2019 as a Next Einstein Forum fellow
- Born: Kenya
- Education: Open University, Liverpool School of Tropical Medicine
- Awards: Next Einstein Fellow
- Scientific career
- Fields: Immunology, cellular immunology
- Workplaces: African Academy of Sciences, African Population and Health Research Centre
- Thesis: Changes in protein levels as markers of severe disease: an investigation of severe malaria (2008)

Evelyn Nungari Gitau is a Kenyan cellular immunologist at the African Academy of Sciences, and was named a Next Einstein Fellow.

== Early life and education ==
Gitau grew up in the Dagoretti area of Nairobi, Kenya. She attended The Kenya High School from 1990 to 1993, where she developed a passion for chemistry, and would spend her free time at the chemistry lab at the University of Nairobi where her best friend's father was the head of the Chemistry department. After graduating high school, she was selected for the inaugural medicine class at Moi University but chose to study chemistry instead.

In 2002, Gitau, joined the KEMRI-Wellcome Trust Programme as a research assistant in pharmacology. The KEMRI-Wellcome Trust Programme-Kenya then sponsored her doctoral degree in cellular immunology at the Open University in the UK, in collaboration with the Liverpool School of Tropical Medicine. Gitau's doctoral research investigated neurological infections in children living in malaria-endemic areas, specifically, how changes in protein levels could be used to detect severe disease. Gitau compared the proteins in the plasma and cerebrospinal fluid of children with cerebral malarial to those in children with other encephalopathies.

== Research and career ==
Gitau returned to Kenya in 2007 to work as a post-doctoral assistant in Kilifi. There, she investigated the cellular immune responses to the P. falciparum malaria. Gitau's research examines how cerebral malaria affects cells, specifically in children, and has led internationally competitive research on the subject. Samples were initially frozen and shipped to Kenya from the United Kingdom, but Gitau was concerned that this processing could affect her research, so she lobbied for the purchase of much-needed equipment in her lab.

Gitau's research emphasised how severe malnutrition often overlapped with severe malaria and other childhood infections: children who were severely undernourished were more likely to die from preventable infections. In 2013, as a postdoctoral researcher at the KEMRI-Wellcome Trust Research Programme (KWTP), she received a "Stars in Global Health" seed grant worth $100,000 from the competitive Grand Challenges Canada, supported by the Canadian government. The grant supported her research to develop a simple blood test for severe malnutrition and common infections.

Gitau served as the African Academy of Science's Programme manager for the Alliance for Accelerating Excellence in Science in African (AESA). In this capacity, she set up the Grand Challenges Africa initiative, raising over $11 million, and oversaw the implementation. The initiative, supported by the Bill and Melinda Gates Foundation, funds projects working to achieve the Sustainable Development Goals led by innovators from African countries. She stepped down from this role on 31 October 2017, but continues to support the initiative in an advisory capacity.

Gitau is the Director of Research Capacity Strengthening at the African Population and Health Research Center, contributing to its signature programme: the Consortium for the Advancement of Research Training in Africa (CARTA). She serves on numerous advisory boards including the Independent Scientific Advisory Board (ISAB), the Malawi-Liverpool-Wellcome Trust Clinical Research Programme College of Medicine, the Investment Committee Grand Challenges Canada, and the Crick-Africa Network. Gitau also participates in a mentorship program in Kenya that aims to encourage more women to study science by pairing young girls with high school science students on science projects.

== Awards ==
In 2015, Gitau was named as a fellow of the Next Einstein Forum, which aims 'to create the right environment for the next Einstein to emerge from Africa'. She is the ambassador for the development of Science, Technology, Engineering and Mathematics in Africa.

Gitau was also on the Quartz Africa Innovators 2016 List, which highlights innovators for their "groundbreaking work, thought-leading initiatives and creative approaches to problems."
