= Amina Abdi Rabar =

Kenyan television and radio presenter

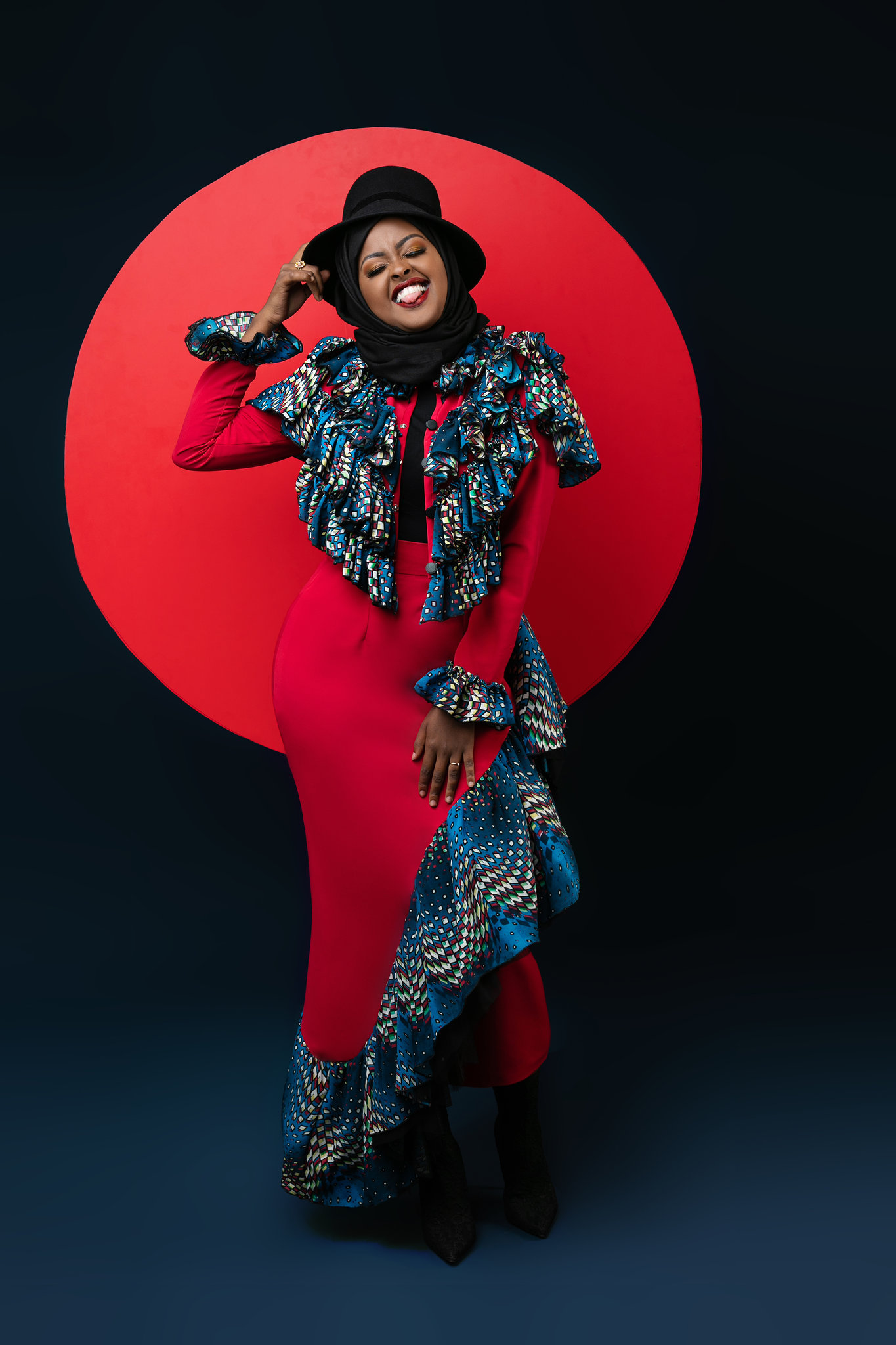
- Born: Amina Abdi; 1989 (age 36–37); Nairobi, Kenya
- Occupations: TV presenter; Radio presenter; Singer

Amina Abdi Rabar (born 1989) is a Kenyan TV and radio presenter based in Nairobi, Kenya. She has hosted the shows Capital in the Morning for 98.4 Capital FM, Alfajiri for K24 TV, and The Trend for NTV.

== Biography ==
Abdi was born in Nairobi, Kenya. She grew up in Kawangware and Eastleigh. Both of her parents are from the Borana community: Her mother is from Isiolo and her father is from Moyale. She attended The Kenya High School and completed her secondary education in 2006.

== Career ==
Abdi began her career at Homeboyz Radio. As a junior presenter, she would fill in as a senior host when necessary. Later, she was given a Saturday night show.

Chris Kirubi spotted Abdi and offered her a job as the presenter of 98.4 Capital FM's Hits not Homework. Abdi hosted the show for five years before she quit. She also hosted the morning show Capital In The Morning alongside Fareed Khimani. In 2020, she left 98.4 Capital FM.

Abdi has also worked for K24. However, she quit hosting K24's Alfajiri Show in 2017, after a two-year stint.

Abdi has emceed Maisha Magic East's Turn Up with DJ Joe Mfalme. In November 2017, she began hosting NTV's The Trend as a permanent replacement to Larry Madowo. In the September 5, 2025, episode of The Trend, she announced her departure from the show and NTV.

In 2020, Abdi co-hosted the seventh edition of the Africa Magic Viewers' Choice Award ceremony alongside IK Osakioduwa in Lagos, Nigeria.

Abdi is a singer and has sung for artists such as Jay A and Octopizzo. However, she left the music scene due to, she said in an interview with Switch TV Kenya, "the bribing you had to do", the pay, and the costs of making music.

Abdi has also been involved in humanitarian work, as a UNHCR High-level influencer for the agency's LuQuLuQu campaign.
