= Commissions and Independent Offices of Kenya =

The Commissions and Independent Offices of the Kenya Government are created by Chapter 15 of the Constitution of Kenya or acts of Parliament

== Constitutionally Independent ==
=== Commissions ===
The commissions are:

- Kenya National Commission on Human Rights
- National Land Commission
- Independent Electoral and Boundaries Commission
- Parliamentary Service Commission
- Judicial Service Commission
- Commission on Revenue Allocation
- Public Service Commission
- Salaries and Remuneration Commission
- Teachers Service Commission
- National Police Service Commission
- Ethics and Anti-corruption Commission
- Nairobi Rivers Commission

== Created by Acts of Parliament ==
The following independent commissions created by acts of parliament:

- Ethics and Anti-Corruption Commission
- National Cohesion and Integration Commission

Independent Policing Oversight Authority..
