= Abdallah Daar =

Dr. Abdallah Daar together with Dr. Peter Singer on Bookbits radio.

Dr. Abdallah Daar is an emeritus Professor of Clinical Public Health, Global Health, and Surgery at the University of Toronto. He has also been a Senior Scientist at the Research Institutes of University Health Network/Toronto General Hospital Research Institute, and the Hospital for SickKids. At the University of Toronto Joint Centre for Bioethics, from 2001 to 2007, he was the co-director of the Canadian Program on Genomics and Global Health, and the Director of the University of Toronto Program in Applied Ethics and Biotechnology. At the Sandra Rotman Centre, he was Director of Ethics and Commercialization.

In 2010, he was a co-founder with Peter Singer of Grand Challenges Canada, where he was also a member of the Governing Board, Chief Scientific and Ethics Officer, and Chair of the International Scientific Advisory Board. Professor Daar was the founding chair of the Board of the Global Alliance for Chronic Diseases (2009-2011) and Founding Chair of the advisory board of the United Nations University International Institute of Global Health. He was also until recently, a member of the Board of Directors of Genome Canada; and a Member of the United Nations Secretary-General's Scientific Advisory Board.

Professor Daar is a Permanent Visiting Fellow of the Stellenbosch Institute for Advanced Study.

After medical schools in Uganda and London, England, he went to the University of Oxford, where he did post-graduate clinical training in surgery and also in internal medicine, a doctorate (DPhil) in Transplant Immunology, and a fellowship in organ transplantation. He was a clinical lecturer in the Nuffield Dept. of Surgery at Oxford for several years before going to the Middle East to help start two medical schools. He was the founding chair of surgery at Sultan Qaboos University in Oman for a decade, before moving to the University of Toronto in January 2001.

Professor Daar's academic career has spanned biomedical sciences, organ transplantation, surgery, global health, and bioethics. He has worked in various advisory or consulting capacities with the UN, the World Health Organization, and UNESCO. From 1999 to 2010, he was a member of the Ethical, Legal, and Social Issues Committee of the Human Genome Organization; and from 2008 to 2015, he was a member of UNESCO's International Bioethics Committee.

Professor Daar is a Fellow of the Royal Society of Canada, the Academy of Sciences for the Developing World (TWAS), the African Academy of Sciences, the Canadian Academy of Health Sciences, and the Islamic World Academy of Sciences. In 2017 Professor Daar was made an Officer of the Order of Canada.
