= Quincy Timberlake =

Kenyan politician (born 1980)

Personal details
- Born: 22 April 1980 (age 46) Homa Bay, Kenya
- Party: Platinum Centralizer and Unionist Party of Kenya (PlaCenta Party of Kenya)
- Spouse(s): Esther and Rose Mueni, Timberlake (m. 2010)
- Occupation: Engineer, musician, political activist
- Website: placentapartyofkenya.net

Quincy Zuma Wambitta Timberlake (born 22 April 1980) is a Kenyan political activist, occultist, and former presidential candidate, now resident in Australia. Along with Esther Arunga and Joseph Hellon, he is the co-founder of the PlaCenta Party (Platinum Centraliser and Unionist Party) of Kenya, which according to its manifesto aims "to promote and protect individual rights and freedoms set forth in the Kenyan Constitution and to limit the scope of national government authority and spending."

Timberlake came into the public eye after announcing his political ambitions in 2010 and declaring that he would run for the Langata Constituency before the promulgation of the constitution. He later announced that he would contest the 2017 presidential election.

== Politics ==
The PlaCenta Party of Kenya was founded by Hellon, Timberlake and Arunga while they were still members of Hellon's Finger of God church. Hellon later broke ties with the couple, claiming they had attempted to defraud him.

According to the party website, Project Take Back Kenya is an effort to break the rotational pattern of parties replacing names but featuring the same politicians at every election. The party's stated objective is to "thrash the elite stranglehold on liberty, uniting Kenya's culturally diverse patriots who embrace traditional family values and restoring freedom of worship and expression."

In 2010, Timberlake announced his intention to run for Prime Minister in the 2012 elections. A new Constitution was passed in the same year, bringing major amendments to the governing structure of the country. Timberlake then shifted his goal to contesting for the presidency. A number of court charges followed, which would have hindered him from contesting according to the law. Timberlake abandoned his presidential ambition and contested the seat of Lang'ata, the former PM's constituency.

== Controversy and arrest ==
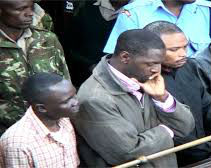
Timberlake arriving from Nyayo House under tight security to face charges of being a member of a cult before Chief Magistrate Gilbert Mutembei

In February 2010, Hellon, Timberlake and Arunga announced their entry into politics under the umbrella of the PlaCenta Party of Kenya, with Hellon contesting for the presidency and Arunga for the seat of Karachuonyo Constituency and as a contender for the seat of Deputy President. On the same day that they made the announcement, Arunga resigned from her job as a news anchor at Kenya Television Network. Within hours of the announcement, Arunga and Hellon were arrested for being members of an illegal society, the Finger of God, an evangelical church which Mrs Timberlake had attended for a year. The church had been registered as legal by the government 5 years previously. Computers and laptops were destroyed, documents confiscated and vehicles impounded. Timberlake was also arrested; while the rest of the group was released on bail after 2 days, he and Arunga were held in police custody. They both claim to have been isolated and tortured. Timberlake spent months behind bars but was finally released with no charges in May 2011. Arunga, who had previously broken off her engagement to another church member, married him on 3 March while he was still in custody.

After being released from custody, Timberlake remained under house arrest for several months on suspicion of being in the country illegally and planning a revolt against the government. The arrests were widely publicised.

The couple was presented before the court on charges including being members of an illegal society (the Finger of God) and illegally holding passports from various countries. The cases were postponed for several months. At the trial Assistant Commissioner of Police Samuel Chumo testified that nothing unusual was found at Hellon's house. The court dismissed a total of 36 charges.

The couple stated that given constant attacks from the media they could no longer live in the country and that they were forced to flee. After a short period in Dubai, they have since resettled in Australia, where Timberlake considered working with the Australian Labor Party.

== Personal life ==
Timberlake married Esther Arunga on 3 March 2010. She is a barrister with degrees from the University of Wollongong and as of July 2012 works at the New South Wales Supreme Court. She was previously a television and radio news anchor and journalist, having worked for the Kenya Television Network and before that at 98.4 Capital FM in Nairobi. During her time as a radio presenter, she focused on issues facing Kenyans such as their day to day livelihoods and inequality. After being arrested along with her husband and Hellon, Arunga sued her parents, a leading psychiatrist, the Attorney General and the Kenya Police for wrongful imprisonment and torture.

In June 2014, the elder of the couple's sons died at their home. The couple reported that he had fallen down stairs while playing, but on 2 September, Timberlake was charged with his murder. Later Timberlake's wife Esther was charged as an accessory and was released on bail. She gave new evidence that her husband had used traditional Kenyan healing techniques on the boy and had pressed his stomach repeatedly and thrown him against a wall, and that he had received treatment for mental problems after the boy died. In April 2016 he was readmitted to mental hospital after reportedly being violent towards his wife and others.
