= Office of the Auditor-General (Kenya) =

Independent supreme audit institution of Kenya

The Office of the Auditor-General of Kenya is an Independent Office established under Article 229 of the Constitution of Kenya to audit Government Bodies and report on their management of allocated funds. The current Auditor-General is Nancy Gathungu.

== Roles ==
The Auditor-General's roles under the Kenyan constitution are:

- Within six months after the end of each financial year, the Auditor-General shall audit and report, in respect of that financial

year, on:

  - Accounts of the national and county governments
  - Accounts of all funds and authorities of the national and county governments;
  - Accounts of all courts
  - Accounts of every commission and independent office established by the Constitution
  - the accounts of the National Assembly, the Senate and the county assemblies
  - Accounts of political parties funded from public funds;
  - The public debt
  - Accounts of any other entity that legislation requires the Auditor-General to audit.
- The Auditor-General may audit and report on the accounts of any entity that is funded from public funds.

== Reports ==
The Auditor-General is mandated to do the following through the audit reports:

- An audit report shall confirm whether or not public money has been applied lawfully and in an effective way.
- Audit reports shall be submitted to Parliament or the relevant county assembly
- Within three months after receiving an audit report, Parliament or the county assembly shall debate and consider the report and take appropriate action.

== Auditors-General ==
- June 2020 - to present: Nancy Gathungu
- August 2019 - to June 2020: office vacant
- August 2011 - August 2019: Mr. Edward R. O. Ouko
