= Joseph Hellon =

Kenyan jazz musician, church leader and political candidate

- Born: Nimrod Joseph Onyango Omondi Hellon; 20 May 1977 (age 49)

Nimrod Joseph Onyango Omondi Hellon (born 20 May 1977) is a controversial head of the alleged cultic Finger of God Church, Kenyan jazz musician and co-founder of the Placenta Party.

== Early life and career ==
Hellon was the fifth of nine children of poor sugarcane farmers, and was raised in Migori. By the end of high school at Starehe Boys Centre, he was already working as a music teacher. In 1994 he became a teacher at Real Music School in the Westlands area of Nairobi, which is affiliated with London College of Music. He soon became principal and later renamed it Jether House of Music. The school trains individuals and ensembles in classical and popular music.

In 2007 Hellon started the Finger of God Church. In February 2010, in connection with his cousin TV presenter Esther Arunga's conflict with her parents, he was arrested on charges of running an illegal society; he was found innocent and released after one week in jail. Arunga subsequently married Quincy Timberlake, another official in the church. Hellon has since said that Timberlake spoofed e-mails from the televangelist Benny Hinn, leading him to believe Finger of God was under Hinn's guidance. The church now meets in members' homes.

Hellon co-founded the Placenta Party in 2010 with Timberlake and their wives, and considered running in the 2013 Kenyan general election as the party's presidential candidate. Late in 2012 he decided not to, while not ruling out a 2017 run.

== Marriage ==
Hellon is married to Kuyu Hellon; they have a son, a daughter, and two adopted daughters, the children of his late brother.

== Discography ==
- Zamar
- Ekkaleo
- Bizkuti,
- Hellon Live in Bizkuti
- Afro Jazz featuring Hellon and Aaron.
- Fish Conspiracy
