= Jean La Fontaine =

British anthropologist (born 1931)

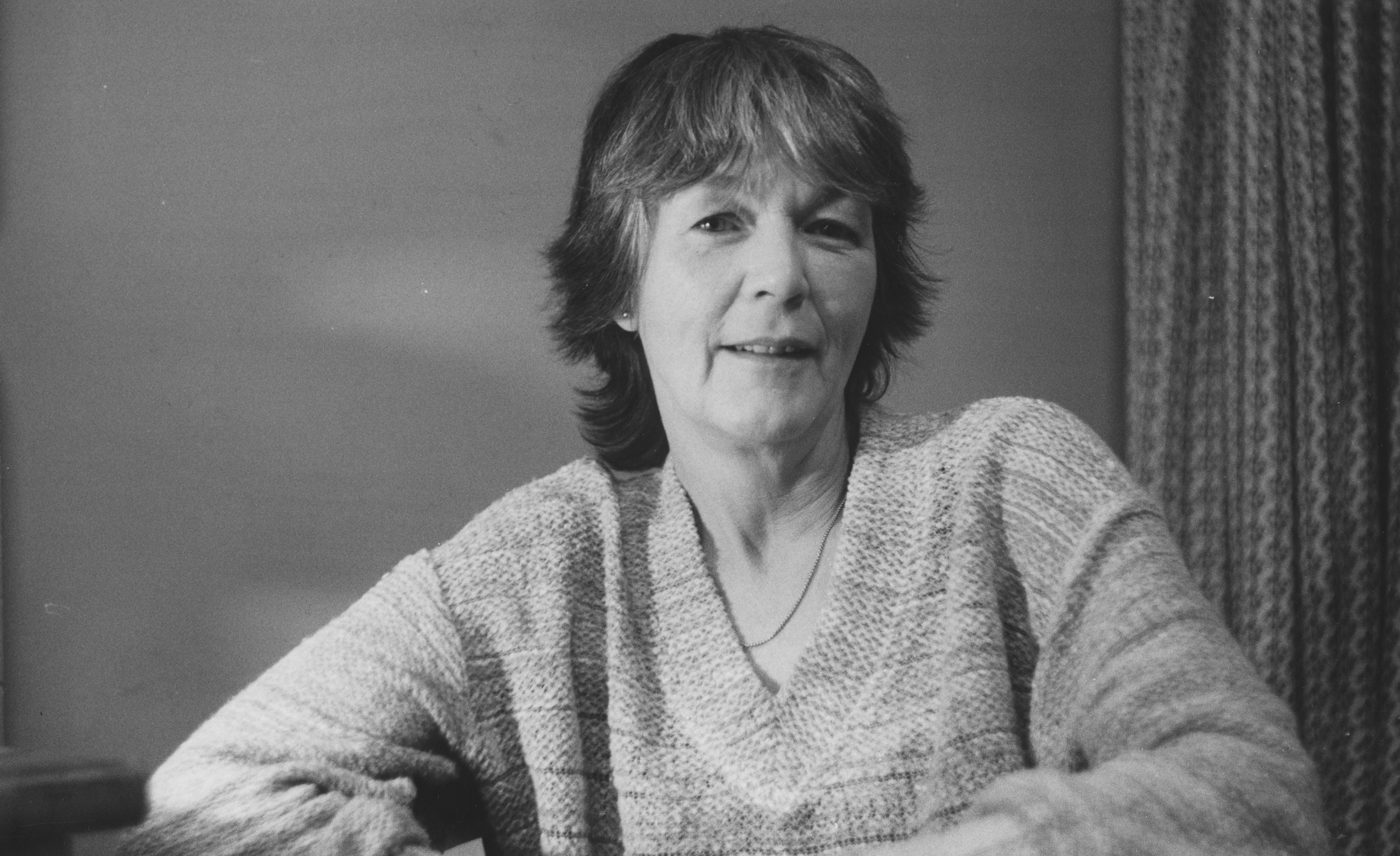
La Fontaine in 1983

Jean Sybil La Fontaine FRAI (born 1 November 1931) is a British anthropologist and emeritus professor of the London School of Economics. She has done research in Africa and the UK, on topics including ritual, gender, child abuse, witchcraft and Satanism. In 1994 she wrote a government report: The Extent and Nature of Organised and Ritual Abuse.

== Early life ==
La Fontaine was born in Nairobi, Kenya, on 1 November 1931 and educated at The Kenya High School, Nairobi. She then studied at Newnham College, Cambridge, gaining a B.A. in archaeology and anthropology in 1953 and a Ph.D. in 1957.

== Career ==
After teaching at King's College, Newcastle (1961, part-time), Lovanium University, Zaire (1962–1963) and Birkbeck College (1965–1968), La Fontaine was appointed Reader in Anthropology at the London School of Economics in 1968 and Professor of Anthropology there in 1978. She retired in 1983, being granted the title of professor emeritus. Professor La Fontaine was president of the Royal Anthropological Institute from 1985 to 1987.

== Recognition ==
La Fontaine has received honorary doctorates from University of Linkoping, Sweden, in 1999, the Open University in 2003, and Goldsmiths, University of London in 2008.

== Publications ==
- Speak of the Devil: Tales of Satanic Abuse in Contemporary England (1998)
