= Lucky iron fish =

Iron fish, heated when cooking food, used against iron deficiency

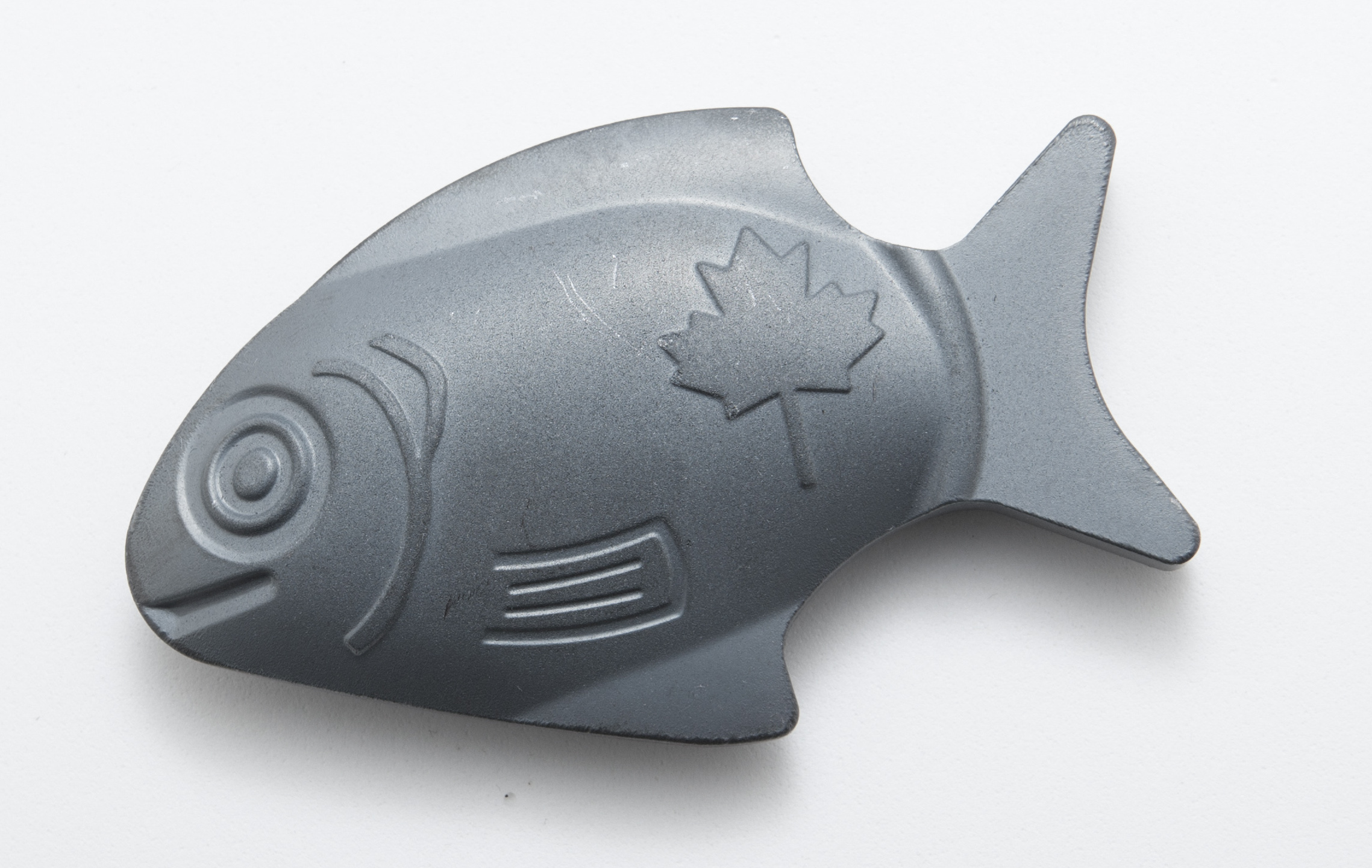
A lucky iron fish

Lucky iron fish are fish-shaped cast iron ingots used to provide dietary supplementation of iron to individuals affected by iron-deficiency anemia. The ingots are placed in a pot of boiling water to leach elemental iron into the water and food. They were developed in 2008 by Canadian health workers in Cambodia, and in 2012 a company, The Lucky Iron Fish Project, was formed to develop the iron fish on a larger scale, promote them among rural areas, and distribute them to non-governmental organization partners.

Research published in 2017 found that the iron ingot had no effect on anemia caused by factors other than iron deficiency. It was therefore not recommended for use in Cambodia and other countries where the majority of anaemia is not due to iron deficiency and the prevalence of genetic hemoglobin disorders is high.

== Motivation ==
About 60% of pregnant Cambodian women are (as of 2010) anemic as a result of dietary iron deficiency, resulting in premature labour and childbirth hemorrhaging. Babies have an increased incidence of brain development problems. Iron deficiency is the "most widespread nutritional disorder" in Cambodia, affecting 44% of the population and resulting in a GDP loss of about $70 billion annually.

Cast-iron cookware is known to transmit iron to food through cooking, but the cost to obtain it is prohibitive for impoverished people in rural Cambodia.

== Development ==
University of Guelph student Christopher Charles received a grant to conduct epidemiological health research in Cambodia from the Canadian International Development Agency (CIDA) after completing an undergraduate degree in biomedical science. The research group distributed an iron disc to women in the village, asking them to place the disc in their pot while making soup or boiling water. The women were reluctant to use the chunk of iron while cooking, and "almost no one used it". Charles stated that it was a "challenge in social marketing". Several weeks before returning to Canada to start his Master's program, Charles called his doctoral advisor Alastair Summerlee to postpone his hormone research project. Summerlee told him to focus his research on preventing iron deficiency anemia, which eventually "spiralled into a PhD project".

Charles and others distributed iron ingots in the shape of a lotus flower, but that was also rejected by the villagers. During discussions with village elders, Charles learned about a fish species deemed a symbol of good luck, health, and happiness in local folklore. The group created fish-shaped iron ingots, which the villagers were more willing to use. Initial results suggested this was followed by a decrease in anemia levels among the villagers. Charles would later state that "You can have the best treatment in the world, but if people won’t use it, it won't matter."

== Evaluation ==
A trial conducted from September 2008 to February 2009 found that the fish increased blood iron levels in individuals for at least three months, but that continued use was found to have negligible long-term effects on blood iron levels. The research spanned the late monsoon season and a dry season that began in December. The villagers relied on harvested monsoon water during the former period, and tube well water during the latter. In the study area, tube well water has high concentrations of arsenic and manganese ions, which act as complexing agents in the presence of iron. This may have resulted in the sequestration of the iron released by the ingot as well as that normally available from the food. The researchers interpreted the difference in water quality as a confounding variable, and conducted a second study to control for it.

Research on iron-arsenic chemistry in the local aquifer sands shows that ferric oxides are associated with low-arsenic groundwater, whereas ferrous oxides indicate higher arsenic concentrations.

The subsequent trial found that, compared to the base blood iron rate at the beginning of the trial, individuals using the iron fish had increased levels of blood iron after 12 months, and the rate of anemia decreased by 43%.

A randomized control trial in 2017 found that the iron fish did not increase hemoglobin concentrations in a sample group of 340 Cambodian women. These women did have anemia, but it was not attributed to low levels of iron. The conclusion of the study stated "We do not recommend the use of the fish-shaped iron ingot in Cambodia or in countries where the prevalence of iron deficiency is low and genetic hemoglobin disorders are high".

== Production ==
In December 2012, University of Guelph biomedical science doctoral student Gavin Armstrong established The Lucky Iron Fish Project, a company founded to commercialize the concept. The company employs "hard-to-employ Cambodians" to manufacture the fish-shaped iron ingots using recycled scrap iron from a nearby factory. The company began promoting the product in a few rural villages in October 2013, and began a full marketing campaign in Kandal Province in January 2014.

In May 2014, the company announced that it had obtained CA$860,000 in financing, including CA$500,000 from Grand Challenges Canada, for scale production of 60,000 iron fish at a cost of about CA$5 per fish. It also received $1.1 million from private investors. The company had delivered about 11,000 units to non-governmental organization partners in the first five months of 2014. It sells the units when possible, as it is more likely that individuals will use it if it is purchased, but will also distribute it for free where needed. It also planned to sell units in Canada for $25, each purchase accompanied by the donation of three units in Cambodia. As of November 2015, the company donates one unit for each unit purchased.

On 28 April 2014, the company announced in a press release that it had obtained the B Corporation certification issued by the nonprofit organisation B Lab.

== Use ==
The smiling iron fish is 3 inches (7.6 cm) long and weighs about 200 grams (7.1 oz). It is placed in a cooking vessel with 1 or 2 drops of lemon juice for 10 minutes in 1 litre of boiling water. The lemon juice improves intestinal iron absorption. The iron fish is also used while cooking rice or stews. Approximately 92% of villagers who have an iron fish use it regularly, and many of them recommend it to friends and family as a symbol of luck.

The flattened ingot was designed to maximize the exposed surface area during cooking, thus maximizing the amount of iron leached from the ingot to the food or water in the pot. Its use results in the average villager obtaining about 75% of the daily recommended dietary iron.

Armstrong states that the iron does not change the taste of the water or food into which it is leached. The project targets youth in Cambodia to promote the project because of the high level of adult illiteracy in its rural areas.
