= Elspeth Huxley =

English writer, journalist, magistrate, environmentalist and adviser

Elspeth Huxley CBE
- Born: Elspeth Grant; 23 July 1907; London
- Died: 10 January 1997 (aged 89); Tetbury, Gloucestershire, England
- Education: Reading University, Cornell University
- Occupations: Author, journalist, broadcaster, magistrate, environmentalist, farmer, and government adviser
- Spouse: Gervas Huxley
- Relatives: Huxley family
- Writing career
- Subject: Settler life in British Kenya
- Notable works: The Flame Trees of Thika, The Mottled Lizard

Elspeth Joscelin Huxley CBE (née Grant; 23 July 1907 – 10 January 1997) was an English writer, journalist, broadcaster, magistrate, environmentalist, farmer, and government adviser. She wrote over 40 books, including her best-known lyrical books, The Flame Trees of Thika and The Mottled Lizard, based on her youth in a coffee farm in British Kenya. Her husband, Gervas Huxley, was a grandson of Thomas Henry Huxley and a cousin of Aldous Huxley.

== Early life and education ==
Nellie and Major Josceline Grant, Elspeth's parents, arrived in Thika in what was then British East Africa in 1912, to start a life as coffee farmers in colonial Kenya. Elspeth, aged six, arrived in December 1913, complete with governess and maid. Her upbringing was unconventional; she was "almost treated as a parcel, being passed from hand to hand". Huxley's 1959 book The Flame Trees of Thika explores how unprepared for rustic life the early British settlers really were. It was adapted into a television miniseries in 1981. Elspeth was educated at a whites-only school in Nairobi.

She left Africa in 1925, earning a degree in agriculture at Reading University in England and studying at Cornell University in upstate New York. She returned to Africa periodically.

== Career ==
Huxley was appointed Assistant Press Officer to the Empire Marketing Board in 1929. She resigned her post in 1932 and travelled widely. Huxley started writing soon after her marriage; her first book, White Man's Country: Lord Delamere and the making of Kenya about the famous white settler, was published in 1935.

Huxley's 1939 book Red Strangers describes life among the Kikuyu of Kenya around the time of the arrival of the first European settlers. The manuscript was sent first to the publisher Macmillan, but Harold Macmillan, then working for the family firm, agreed to publish it only with considerable cuts, including a graphic description of female circumcision. Huxley refused, and the book was published by Chatto & Windus. Huxley remembered: "It was indeed a happy day for me when our future Prime Minister couldn't take clitoridectomy." The book was republished by Penguin Books in 1999 and again by Penguin Classics in 2000; Richard Dawkins played an important role in getting the book republished, and wrote a preface to the new edition.

Her final tally of 42 books included the ten works of fiction and 29 non-fiction books, as well as thousands of pamphlets and articles.

During the Second World War, Huxley was a broadcaster for the BBC.

In 1960, Huxley was appointed an independent member of the Advisory Commission for the Review of the Constitution of the Federation of Rhodesia and Nyasaland (the Monckton Commission). Although she was initially an advocate of continued colonial rule, she later called for the independence of African nations.

In the 1960s, she served as a correspondent for the National Review magazine.

Huxley was a friend of Joy Adamson, the author of Born Free, and is mentioned in the biography of Joy and George Adamson entitled The Great Safari. Huxley wrote the foreword to Joy's autobiography The Searching Spirit.

== Personal life ==
She married Gervas Huxley, the son of doctor Henry Huxley (1865–1946) in 1931. They had one son, Charles, who was born in February 1944.

== Death and legacy ==
Huxley died on 10 January 1997 aged 89, in a nursing home at Tetbury in Gloucestershire, England.

A collection of twelve boxes of photographs, prints, negatives, contact prints and slides is held at Bristol Archives in the British Empire and Commonwealth Collection. Most of the photographs were taken by Huxley, with the rest collected by her. The collection covers Huxley's whole career (1896-1981) and subject matter includes Kenyan safari landscapes and local people (specifically the Kikuyu people), the Mau Mau uprising, white settlers, Edwardian Mombasa, and a transcript of an oral history interview taken by the British Empire and Commonwealth Museum (Ref. 1995/076). Other collections related to Huxley can be found at the Bodleian Library and Cambridge University Library Department of Manuscripts and University Archives.

Christine S. Nicholls wrote Elspeth Huxley: A Biography, published by Harper Collins in 2002.

== Honours ==
- Commander of the Order of the British Empire, 1962.

== Works ==
=== Fiction ===
- Murder at Government House (1937)
- Murder on Safari (1938)
- Death of an Aryan (U.S.:The African Poison Murders) (1939)
- Red Strangers (1939) ISBN 0141188502
- The Walled City (1948)
- A Thing to Love (1954)
- The Red Rock Wilderness (1957)
- The Merry Hippo (U.S.: The Incident at the Merry Hippo) (1963)
- A Man from Nowhere (1964)
- The Prince Buys the Manor (1982)

=== Non-fiction ===
- White Man's Country: Lord Delamere and the Making of Kenya (1935)
- East Africa (1941) - the British Commonwealth in pictures.
- Atlantic Ordeal: The Story of Mary Cornish (1941)
- Race and Politics in Kenya: A Correspondence Between Elspeth Huxley and Margery Perham (1944)
- African Dilemmas (1948)
- Settlers of Kenya (1948)
- The Sorcerer's Apprentice: A Journey Through East Africa (1948)
- I Don't Mind If I Do (1950)
- Four Guineas: A Journey Through West Africa (1954) - "contains facts about slavery in West Africa".
- No Easy Way: A History of the Kenyan Farmers' Association and UNGA Limited (1957)
- The Flame Trees of Thika: Memories of an African Childhood (1959)
- A New Earth: An Experiment in Colonialism (1960)
- The Mottled Lizard (U.S.: On the Edge of the Rift: Memories of Kenya) (1962)
- Back Street New Worlds: A Look at Immigrants in Britain (1964)
- Forks and Hope: An African Notebook (1964)
- Brave New Victuals: An Inquiry into Modern Food Production (1965)
- Their Shining Eldorado: A Journey Through Australia (1967)
- Love among the Daughters (1968)
- The Challenge of Africa (1971)
- The Kingsleys: A Biographical Anthology (1973)
- Livingstone and His African Journeys (1974)
- Florence Nightingale (1975)
- Gallipot Eyes: A Wiltshire Diary (1976)
- Scott of the Antarctic (1978)
- Nellie: Letters from Africa (1980)
- Whipsnade: Captive Breeding for Survival (1981)
- Last Days in Eden aka De Laatsten in de Hof van Eden (1984) with Hugo van Lawick
- Out in the Midday Sun: My Kenya (1985)
- Nine Faces of Kenya: Portrait of a Nation (1990)
- Peter Scott: Painter and Naturalist (1993)

== See also ==
- Isak Dinesen, author of Out of Africa.

== Bibliography ==
- Giffuni, Cathe. "A Bibliography of the Mystery Writings of Elspeth Huxley," Clues: Volume 12 No. 2 Fall/Winter 1991, pp. 45–49.
- Nicholls, C. S. Elspeth Huxley. A Biography (HarperCollins, 2002) ISBN 978-0-002-57165-4
