= Maasai Mara University =

University in Kenya

Coordinates: 01°05′35″S 35°51′28″E

- Former name: Narok University College
- Type: Public
- Established: July 16, 2013; 13 years ago
- Chancellor: Dr. Vimal Shah
- Vice-Chancellor: Prof. Peninah Aloo-Obudho
- Location: Narok, Narok County, Kenya
- Campus: 129 acres (52 ha)
- Website: Homepage

Maasai Mara University (MMU), (formerly Narok University College, Moi University Narok Town Campus), is a public university located in Narok County, Kenya.

== Location ==
MMU is located in Narok town, in Narok County, along the Narok-Bomet Highway approximately 147 kilometres (91 mi) by road, northwest of Nairobi, the capital city of Kenya. The geographical coordinates of the university campus are 01°05'35.0"S, 35°51'28.0"E (Latitude:-1.093056; Longitude:35.857778). The university's main campus measures an estimated 129 acres (52 ha).

== Overview ==
MMU is accredited by the Commission for University Education of Kenya on 12th February, 2013. The institution was founded on 16 July 2008 as Narok University College, a constituent college of Moi University and existed as a campus of Moi (Narok Town Campus) in 2007. Maasai Mara University was chartered on 12 February 2013 as a fully-fledged university.

== Academics ==
The following academic courses are offered at Maasai Mara University:

=== Undergraduate ===
As of May 2021, the university offers the following undergraduate degree courses.

- Bachelor of Arts (Sociology)
- Bachelor of Arts (Community Development)
- Bachelor of Arts (Cultural Studies)
- Bachelor of Arts (Economics)
- Bachelor of Arts (Public Administration)
- Bachelor of Arts (Social Work)
- Bachelor of Business Management
- Bachelor of Education
- Bachelor of Education (Arts)
- Bachelor of Education (Early Childhood and Primary Education)
- Bachelor of Education (Guidance and Counseling)
- Bachelor of Education (Science)
- Bachelor of Education (Special Education)
- Bachelor of Environmental Science
- Bachelor of Hotels and Hospitality Management
- Bachelor of Human Resource Management
- Bachelor of Journalism and Mass Communication
- Bachelor of Science
- Bachelor of Science (Agricultural Economics and Resource Management)
- Bachelor of Science (Animal Science and Management)
- Bachelor of Science (Business Management)
- Bachelor of Science (Communication and Public Relations)
- Bachelor of Science (Computer Science)
- Bachelor of Science (Forestry)
- Bachelor of Science (Horticultural Science and Management)
- Bachelor of Science (Human Development Management)
- Bachelor of Science (Human Resource Management)
- Bachelor of Science (Information Science)
- Bachelor of Science (Media Science)
- Bachelor of Science (Seed Science and Technology)
- Bachelor of Science (Wildlife Management)
- Bachelor of Science in Applied Statistic With Computing
- Bachelor of Tourism and Travel Management
- Bachelor of Tourism Management

=== Postgraduate ===
As of May 2021, the university offers the following postgraduate degree courses.

- Master of Arts (Sociology)
- Master in Education
- Master of Arts (Economics)
- Master of Education (Curriculum Instruction and Education Media)
- Master of Education (Education Administration)
- Master of Hospitality Management
- Master of Philosophy in Curriculum Development
- Master of Philosophy in Early Childhood Education
- Master of Philosophy in Economics of Education
- Master of Philosophy in Educational Administration
- Master of Philosophy in Educational Planning
- Master of Philosophy in Guidance and Counselling
- Master of Philosophy in Human Resource Development
- Master of Philosophy in Wildlife Management
- Master of Tourism Management
- Masters in Business Management
- Masters in Human Resource Management
- Masters of Education (Educational Foundations)
- Doctor of Philosophy in Business Management
- Doctor of Philosophy in Human Resource Management
- Doctor of Philosophy in Curriculum Studies
- Doctor of Philosophy in Education Psychology
- Doctor of Philosophy in Educational Administration

An updated course list as at 2025 can be found in:

=== Other courses ===
In addition to undergraduate and postgraduate degrees, MMU offers Certificate and Diploma courses in many of the same subjects.

== Other considerations ==
In September 2019 Onyango Kitche Magak, a drama festival and folklore specialist was appointed as the Acting Vice Chancellor of MMU. However, in January 2022, Kiche Magak was replaced by Prof. Joseph Chacha this was preceded by a successful court petition against Mr. Kiche Magak's PhD which he had obtained from Washington International University (WIU) that is not accredited in Kenya.

Mr. Kiche Magak had indicated that he was a specialist in human reproductive health, announced in Kenyan print media, that the university was in the process of launching the manufacture of re-usable sanitary towels. The towels would be distributed to girls from low income families, who otherwise could not afford them. Other collaborators in this female sanitary towels project include (a) Chris Kirubi, an industrialist and philanthropist (b) Jennifer Riria PhD, a businesswoman, banker and corporate executive, who is the CEO of Kenya Women Holding Group (now Echo Network Africa Limited) and (c) Bedi Investments Limited, a textiles and garments manufacturer. They have donated industrial machinery to the project.
