= Red Strangers =

1939 novel by Elspeth Huxley

- First edition
- Author: Elspeth Huxley
- Language: English
- Genre: Historical novel
- Publisher: Chatto and Windus (London)
- Publication date: 1939
- Publication place: United Kingdom
- Media type: Print
- Pages: 406 pp
- OCLC: 156758919

Red Strangers is a 1939 novel by Elspeth Huxley. The story is an account of the arrival of European settlers to colonial Kenya told through the eyes of four generations of Kikuyu tribesmen in Kenya.

== Description ==
The book immerses the reader so completely in the pre-Western Kikuyu culture, that when the Kikuyu are paid money for their labour, it is quite easy to understand why they throw the coins into the bushes. After all, what does money do?

Epic in its scale, Red Strangers spans four generations of a Kikuyu family in Africa and its relationship with European settlers, nicknamed "red" strangers for their sunburns. The book describes a Kenyan tribe and its way of life, with its rituals, its beliefs, its codes and its morality, and shows European customs in stark, unflattering contrast with Kikuyu traditions. The differences in cultural attitudes to war, methods of cultivation, the administering of justice, and the use of money are played out in the semi-fictional view of colonial rule in Kenya.

== Editions ==
The book was out of print for quite some time, but the British biologist Richard Dawkins wrote an article of appreciation for the novel in the Financial Times in 1998 that challenged "any reputable publisher to bring out a copy of their own." Penguin Books published the novel in February 1999, with Dawkins's article as the foreword, followed by a paperback in May 2006. His article was reprinted in A Devil's Chaplain (2003).
