= Peter A. Singer =

Canadian medical researcher

- Born: August 1960
- Education: Harvard Business School, University of Toronto, University of Chicago, Yale University, Upper Canada College
- Occupations: Medical doctor, academic, policy advisor
- Employers: University of Toronto; World Health Organization
- Awards: Fellow of the Royal Society of Canada; Officer of the Order of Canada

Peter Alexander Singer, OC, FRSC, is adjunct professor of medicine at University of Toronto.

From 2008-2018 Singer was chief executive officer of Grand Challenges Canada From 1996-2006 Singer was director of the University of Toronto Joint Centre for Bioethics.

In 2011, Singer was appointed officer of the Order of Canada for his contributions to health research and bioethics, and for his dedication to improving the health of people in developing countries. He is also a Fellow of the Royal Society of Canada, the Canadian Academy of Health Sciences, the U.S. National Academy of Medicine, and the Academy of Sciences for the Developing World. He was formerspecial advisor to the director general of the World Health Organization, He co-authored, along with Abdallah Daar, The Grandest Challenge: Taking Life-Saving Science from Lab to Village.

Peter Singer together with Abdallah Daar on Bookbits radio.

He studied internal medicine at University of Toronto, medical ethics at University of Chicago, public health at Yale University, and management at Harvard Business School.

As of January 2026, Singer sits on the board of the Azrieli Foundation.
