= Nipro =

Japanese medical equipment manufacturer

Nipro Corporation

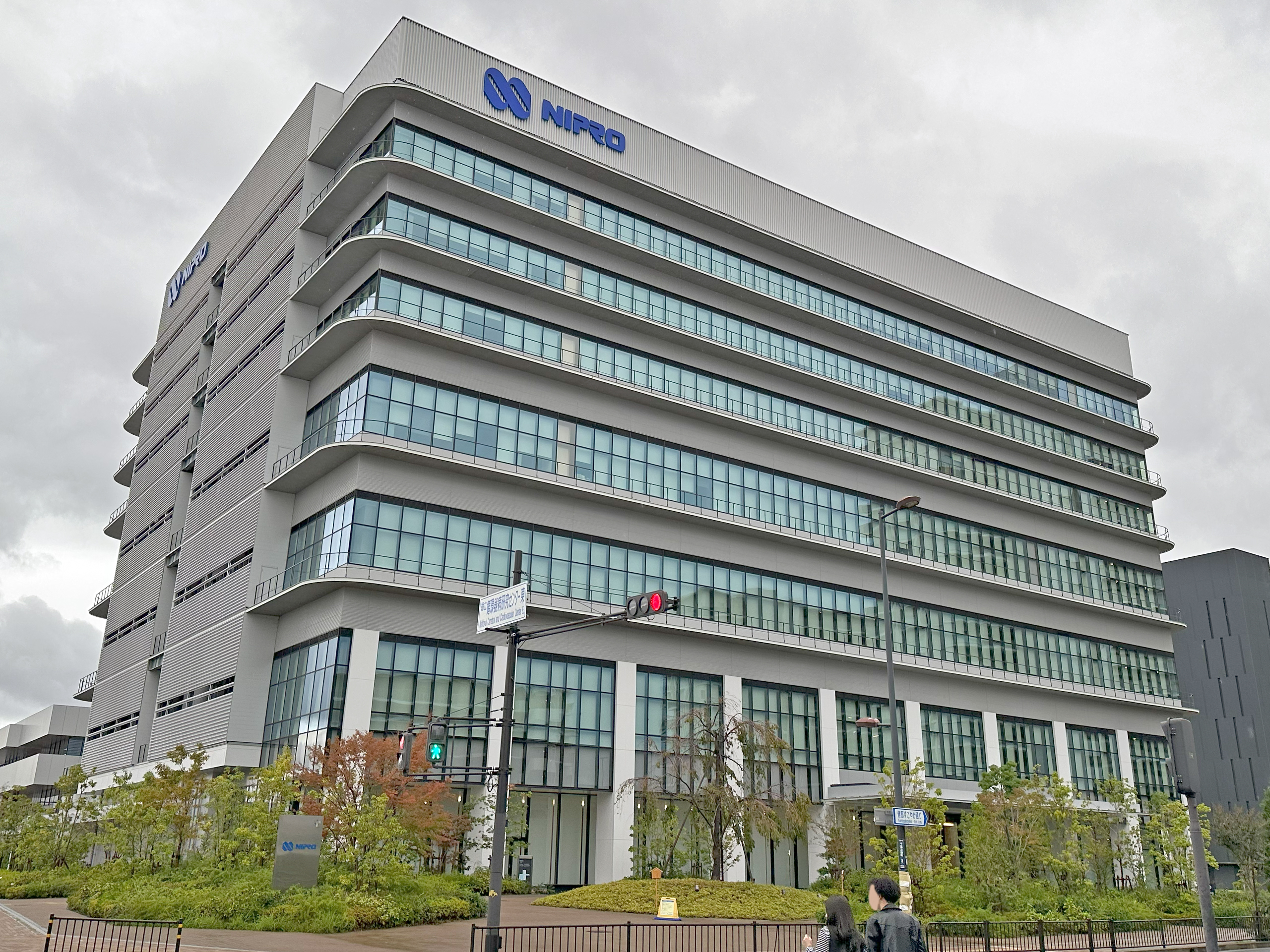
- Headquarters building in Settsu, Osaka
- Type: Public KK
- Traded as: TYO: 8086; OSE: 8086
- Industry: Medical equipment
- Founded: July 8, 1954
- Headquarters: 3-26 Senriokashinmachi, Settsu, Osaka prefecture 566-8510, Japan
- Key people: Yoshihiko Sano, (CEO and President)
- Products: Medical devices; Pharmaceuticals; Pharmaceutical glass
- Revenue: ▲$ 2.562 billion (FY 2012) (¥ 241.021 billion) (FY 2012)
- Net income: ▲$ 108 million (FY 2012) (¥ 10.232 billion) (FY 2012)
- Number of employees: ▲19,327 (consolidated) (as of March 31, 2013)
- Subsidiaries: 58 (10 in Japan and 48 overseas)
- Website: Official website

Nipro Corporation (ニプロ株式会社, Nipro Kabushiki-gaisha) is a Japanese medical equipment manufacturing company. Founded in 1954, the company is headquartered in Osaka and is listed on the Tokyo Stock Exchange and the Osaka Securities Exchange.

As of 2013 the company has 58 subsidiaries in Japan, Asia, North and South America and Europe.

== Subsidiaries ==
In February 2018, the Company entered the endoscope-related business by making Machida Corporation its subsidiary.

In April 1, 2019, the ethical pharmaceutical sales division of subsidiary Nipro ES Pharma Corporation was integrated into the main company’s domestic business division, Pharmaceutical Sales Division.

In April 1, 2023, the Company's head office was relocated to a new building constructed on the Company's own land in Kento Innovation Park in Settsu City. The registered head offices and the location of the manufacturing and sales office based on the Law Concerning Assurance of Quality, Efficacy and Safety of Pharmaceuticals, Medical Devices and Other Products were scheduled to be relocated in October of the same year.

== Business units and products ==
- Medical products
  - Renal products
  - Injection and infusion products
  - Intervention and anesthesiology products
  - Cardiopulmonary products
  - Diabetic care products
- Pharmaceutical products
  - Generic drugs
  - Pharmaceutical kit products
- Glass products
  - Glass tubes
  - Vials, ampoules, syringes, cartridges
  - Glass bulbs for vacuum flasks
  - Vial, syringe, ampoule manufacturing machines
