= Nancy Gathungu =

Auditor General of Kenya since 2020

Auditor General of Kenya
- Incumbent
- Assumed office June 2020
- Preceded by: Edward Ouko

Personal details
- Education: Moi Girls High School, Nairobi
- Alma mater: Jomo Kenyatta University of Agriculture and Technology
- Occupation: Auditor, civil servant
- Known for: Auditor General of Kenya

Nancy Gathungu is the Auditor General of Kenya, taking office in June 2020. She succeeded Edward Ouko who retired in August 2019. She had previously applied to be Auditor General under the 2010 constitution. Nancy Gathungu was educated at Moi Girls High School, Nairobi.

== Career ==
Gathungu is a career civil servant, joining the office of Auditor General in 1993 and being promoted up the ranks to Director Quality Assurance, Office of the Auditor General. At time of appointment, she was a Strategic Management PhD candidate at the Jomo Kenyatta University of Agriculture and Technology. Previous degrees include an MBA in Strategic Management and bachelor's degree of commerce (Accounting Option).

At time of taking office in 2020, Gathungu had a net worth of Ksh30.89 million.

== Major audits ==
In March 2021, Nancy Gathungu oversaw a report showing that half of the KSh 18.5 billion budget of the Kenya Population and Housing Census could not be accounted for.
