= Parliamentary Service Commission =

The Parliamentary Service Commission of Kenya is one of the Independent Commissions in Kenya established under Article 127 the Constitution of Kenya to ensure smooth functioning of the Houses of Parliament i.e. Senate of Kenya and National Assembly of Kenya.

== Roles ==
The commission's roles include:

- Providing services and facilities to ensure the efficient and effective running of Parliament
- constituting offices in the parliamentary service, and appointing and supervising office holders;
- preparing annual estimates of expenditure of the parliamentary service and submitting them to the National Assembly for approval, and exercising budgetary control over the service;
- undertaking, singly or jointly with other relevant organisations, programmes to promote the ideals of parliamentary democracy; and
- performing functions necessary for the well-being of the members and staff of Parliament

== Membership ==
The Members of the Commission are as follows:

- The Speaker National Assembly as Chairperson - Currently, Hon. Moses Masika Wetangula
- The vice-chairperson - elected by the Commission members
- seven members appointed by Parliament from among its members of whom:
1. Four (of which two are women) are nominated by both Houses by Party or Coalition of parties that form the National Government
2. Three (at least one woman) are nominated from both Houses by the parties not forming the national government
- one man and one woman appointed by Parliament from among persons who are experienced in public affairs, but are not members of Parliament.
- Secretary to the Commission held by the Clerk of the Senate - Currently, Mr J. M. Nyegenye
