= Carol Musyoka =

Kenyan lawyer, executive and entrepreneur (born 1972)

- Born: 1972 (age 53–54); Kenya
- Education: University of Nairobi; Cornell University
- Occupations: Lawyer, consultant
- Years active: 1985–present
- Website: carolmusyoka.com

Carol Musyoka (born 1972) is a Kenyan lawyer, business executive and entrepreneur, who is the founder and chief executive officer of Carol Musyoka Consulting Limited, a Nairobi-based consultancy.

== Background and education ==
Musyoka was born in 1972, in Kenya, and received her basic education in Nairobi. For primary school she was at Consolata School and from 1987 to 1990 she attended The Kenya High School for her secondary education. She obtained her Bachelor of Laws degree from the University of Nairobi in July 1996. In May 1998, she completed Master of Laws from Cornell Law School Ithaca, New York, in United States.

== Work experience ==
For one year following her graduation from Cornell University, Musyoka worked as project officer at Modern Africa Fund Managers, based in Washington, D.C., until 1999. In 1999, she returned to Kenya and was hired by Citibank Kenya, as a relationship manager based Nairobi, working in that capacity for four years until 2003.

In 2003, Musyoka was hired by Barclays Bank of Kenya as a senior relationship manager, working in that capacity for the next two years, before she was promoted to Corporate Director, a position she occupied for two years until 2007. For a period of one year, from 2007 until 2008, she served as the chief operating officer at K-Rep Bank, before it re-branded of Sidian Bank. In 2008, she went into private consulting.

== Other considerations ==
Musyoka has been a member in the past or is currently a member of the boards of a number of public and private Kenyan companies, including (a) BAT Kenya (b) East African Breweries Limited (c) Barclays Bank of Kenya (d) K-Rep Bank (e) Business Registration Service of Kenya and (f) Kenya Airways. Carol Musyoka is a member of faculty at Strathmore Business School.

== See also ==
- Rebecca Miano
- Sauda Rajab
- Teodosia Osir
- Kellen Kariuki
