= Jennifer Riria =

Kenyan business woman, corporate executive, banker and academic

- Born: Kenya
- Education: University of Dar es Salaam (Bachelor of Arts in Education); University of Leeds (Master of Arts); Kenyatta University (Doctor of Philosophy)
- Occupations: Businesswoman, academic
- Years active: 1991 — present
- Known for: Microfinance banking, women's empowerment efforts
- Title: Group Chief Executive Officer of Kenya Women Holding Group

Jennifer Riria, is a Kenyan businesswoman, corporate executive, banker, and academic who is the group chief executive officer of Kenya Women Holding Group, a microfinance, banking and insurance group serving nearly one million mostly rural Kenyan women.

== Background and education ==
Riria was born in Kenya. She was the fourth-born in a family with 10 children. She attended a primary school every day, about 4 kilometres (2 mi), from home, traveling barefoot.

She was admitted to Precious Blood High School, an all-girls boarding school administered by the religious order of the Sisters of the Precious Blood, located in Nairobi, Kenya's capital and largest city. At the end of high school, Riria became pregnant.

After giving birth, she went on to study at the University of Dar es Salaam on a scholarship. She graduated with a Bachelor of Arts degree in education. She then earned a Master of Arts degree in Education Administration from the University of Leeds in the United Kingdom. Later, Riria obtained a Doctor of Philosophy in Women's Education and Development, from Kenyatta University.

== Career ==
Following her first degree, Riria taught at Kabete Technical Institute for six months followed by one year at State House Girls High School. In 1979, after her second degree, she returned to her native Kenya and registered for her Doctorate degree at the Kenyatta University. She also began lecturing, part-time at the same university.

In 1991, she joined Kenya Women Finance Trust (KWFT), a microfinance financial institution, founded in 1982. As at 1991, when Riria arrived KWFT was in bad shape, understaffed, and losing money. Riria worked as CEO, janitor, accountant, loan officer and receptionist. Her efforts began to bear fruit and the institution stabilized. In 2010, the institution was split into Kenya Women Microfinance Bank and Kenya Women Holding Limited. The holding company then re-branded to Echo Network Africa Limited, in February 2018. Riria is the incumbent CEO of the holding company.

== Other considerations ==
Riria was the winner of the Ernst & Young World Entrepreneur of the Year Award, for Kenya in 2014. She is chairwoman of Women's World Banking, a global microfinance network consisting of over 53 MFIs from 30 countries. Riria is a supporter and promoter of the Educate the Net 235 Girls programme. The initiative supports needy girls in their education.

She has been on the boards of Kenyan and international organizations, including at the Nairobi Stock Exchange, being the first female in that capacity. She has also been on the boards of Jitegemee Trust Limited, a microfinance company, National Bank of Kenya, and Kenya Post Office Savings Bank.

Riria is the author of two books; an autobiography and A History of Higher Education in Kenya. Both books were launched in June 2014.

== See also ==
- Kellen Kariuki
- Lizzie Wanyoike
- Teodosia Osir
- Esther Nyaiyaki
