= Deutsche Welle =

German international broadcaster

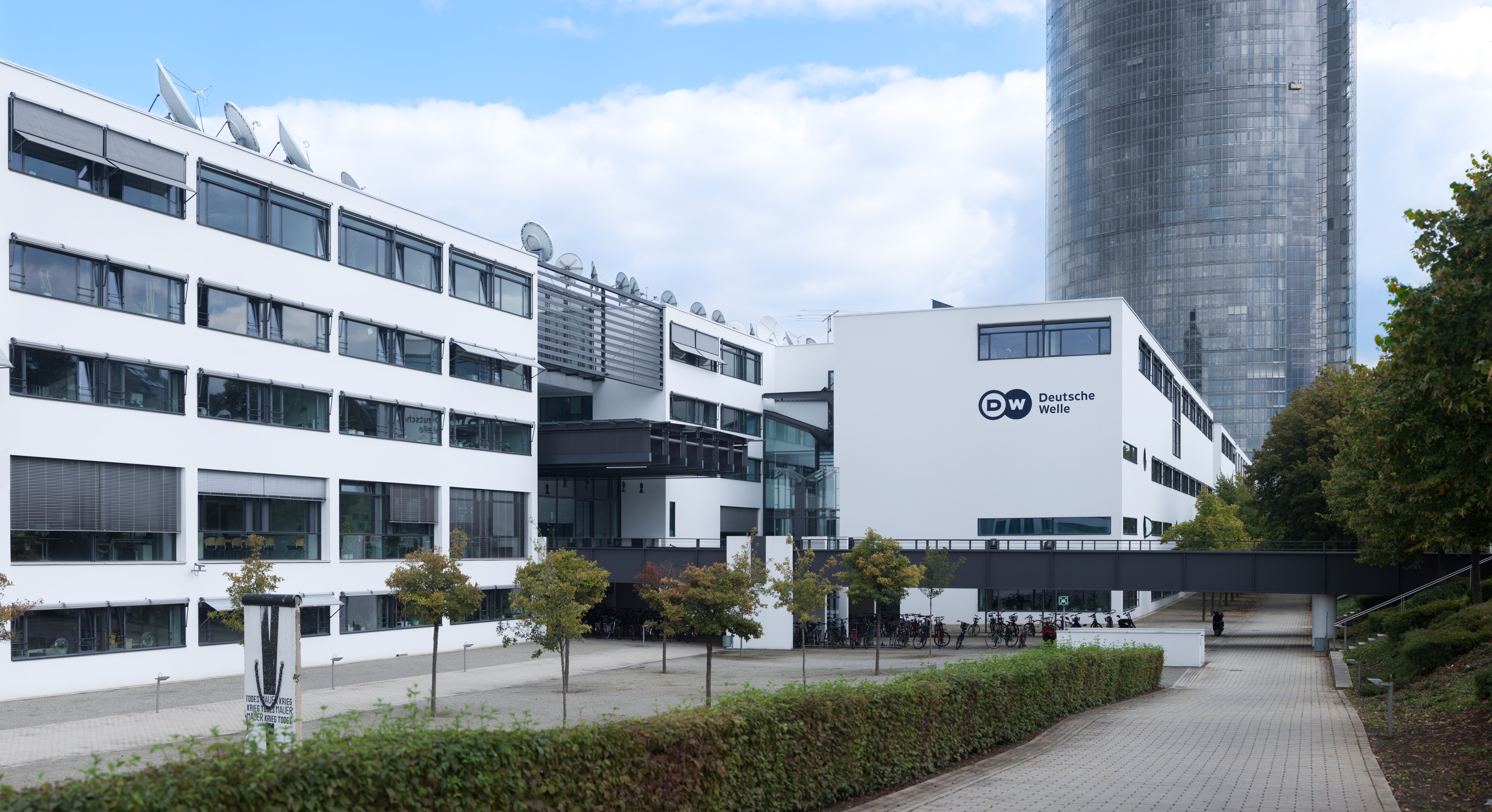
- Headquarters in Bonn
- Type: Broadcasting news and discussions
- Country: Germany
- Broadcast area: Worldwide
- Affiliates: World Radio Network
- Headquarters: Bonn, Germany

Programming
- Languages: German, English, Bengali, Spanish, Hindi, Tamil, Russian, Arabic, Persian, Dari, Pashto, Urdu, Albanian, Amharic, Bosnian, Bulgarian, Mandarin Chinese, French, Greek, Hausa, Indonesian, Kiswahili, Turkish, Macedonian, Portuguese, Romanian, Serbian, Ukrainian
- Picture format: 1080i (HDTV)

Ownership
- Owner: Federal Government of Germany
- Key people: Barbara Massing (Director-General); Wolfram Weimer (Funder as federal commissioner for Culture and Media)

History
- Launched: 3 May 1953; 73 years ago

Links
- Website: www.dw.com dwnewsgngmhlplxy6o2twtfgjnrnjxbegbwqx6wnotdhkzt562tszfid.onion ^{(Accessing link help)}

Availability

Streaming media
- YouTube: DW News
- Livestream: DW English

Deutsche Welle (German: [ˈdɔʏtʃə ˈvɛlə]; lit. 'German Wave'), commonly shortened to DW, is a German state-funded television network and public service international broadcaster funded by the Federal Government of Germany. The service is available in 33 languages. DW's satellite television service consists of channels in English, Spanish, Arabic and Russian. The work of DW is regulated by the Deutsche Welle Act, stating that content is intended to be independent of German government influence. DW is a member of the European Broadcasting Union (EBU).

DW offers regularly updated articles on its news website and runs its own centre for international media development, DW Akademie. The broadcaster's stated goals are to produce reliable news coverage, provide access to the German language, and promote understanding between peoples. It is also a provider of live streaming world news, which, like all DW programs, can be viewed and listened via its website, YouTube, satellite, rebroadcasting and various apps and digital media players.

DW has been broadcasting since 1953. It is headquartered in Bonn, where its radio programmes are produced, but television broadcasts are produced almost entirely in Berlin. Both locations create content for DW's news website. As of 2020, Deutsche Welle had 1,668 employees (annual average). In total, over 4,000 people of over 140 nationalities work in DW's offices in Bonn and Berlin, as well as at other locations worldwide.

== History ==
=== Precursor ===
A predecessor with a similar name was Deutsche Welle GmbH, founded in August 1924 by German diplomat and radio pioneer Ernst Ludwig Voss in Berlin and broadcast regularly from 7 January 1926. The station was initially owned by 70% by Reichs-Rundfunk-Gesellschaft and 30% by the Free State of Prussia. From 1931 onwards, Deutsche Welle broadcast from the Berlin Broadcasting House. On 1 January 1933 Deutsche Welle GmbH was officially transferred to Deutschlandsender GmbH.

The station sees itself in the tradition of the first German foreign broadcaster, the Weltrundfunksender ('World Broadcaster') of the Weimar Republic. The Weltrundfunksender was renamed Deutscher Kurzwellensender ('German Shortwave Broadcaster') by the Nazis in 1933.

=== Beginnings ===
DW's first shortwave broadcast took place on 3 May 1953 with an address by the then-West German President, Theodor Heuss. On 11 June 1953, ARD public broadcasters signed an agreement to share responsibility for Deutsche Welle. At first, it was controlled by Nordwestdeutscher Rundfunk (NWDR). In 1955, NWDR split into Norddeutscher Rundfunk (NDR) and Westdeutscher Rundfunk (WDR), WDR assumed responsibility for Deutsche Welle programming.

Politically, the creation of a German international broadcasting station was supported by CDU chancellor Konrad Adenauer. To prevent governmental indoctrination in Germany, broadcasting is a matter of the federal states. In a years-long dispute between the Adenauer and the federal states of Germany, the federal government was allowed to create Deutschlandfunk aimed at GDR citizens and Deutsche Welle aimed at foreign audiences. In 1959, Adenauer presented a bill to establish three federal broadcasting companies: Deutschlandfunk, Deutsche Welle, and Deutschland-Fernsehen ('Germany-TV'). The Federal Constitutional Court stopped Adenauer's television plans. Radio, on the other hand, was permitted as a federal institution.

In 1960, Deutsche Welle became an independent public body after a court ruled that while broadcasting to Germany was a state matter, broadcasting from Germany was part of the federal government's foreign affairs function.

On 7 June 1962, DW joined ARD as a national broadcasting station. Deutsche Welle was originally headquartered in the West German city of Cologne. After reunification, when much of the government relocated to Berlin, the station's headquarters moved to Bonn.

=== German reunification ===
With the German reunification in 1990, Radio Berlin International (RBI), East Germany's international broadcaster ceased to exist. Some of the RBI staff joined Deutsche Welle and DW inherited some broadcasting facilities, including transmitting facilities at Nauen, as well as RBI's frequencies.

DW (TV) began as RIAS-TV, a television station launched by the West Berlin broadcaster RIAS (Rundfunk im amerikanischen Sektor, 'Radio in the American Sector') in August 1988; they also acquired the German Educational Television Network in the United States. The fall of the Berlin Wall the following year and German reunification in 1990 meant that RIAS-TV was to be closed down. On 1 April 1992, Deutsche Welle inherited the RIAS-TV broadcast facilities, using them to start a German- and English-language television channel broadcast via satellite, DW (TV), adding a short Spanish broadcast segment the following year. In 1995, it began 24-hour operation (12 hours German, 10 hours English, 2 hours Spanish). At that time, DW (TV) introduced a new news studio and a new logo.

Deutsche Welle took some of the former independent radio broadcasting service Deutschlandfunk's foreign-language programming in 1993, when Deutschlandfunk was absorbed into the new Deutschlandradio.

In addition to radio and television programming, DW sponsored some published material. For example, the South-Asia Department published German Heritage: A Series Written for the South Asia Programme in 1967, and in 1984 published African Writers on the Air. Both publications were transcripts of DW programming.

In 2010, it began providing resources to the Washington, D.C.-based German-American Heritage Museum of the USA, along with the German Embassy in Washington and German National Tourist Board.

=== Internet presence ===
In September 1994, Deutsche Welle was the first public broadcaster in Germany with an internet presence, initially www-dw.gmd.de, hosted by the GMD Information Technology Research Center. For its first two years, the site listed little more than contact addresses, although DW's News Journal was broadcast in RealAudio from Real's server beginning in 1995, and Süddeutsche Zeitung's initial web presence, which included news articles from the newspaper, shared the site. In 1996, it evolved into a news website using the URL dwelle.de; in 2001, the URL changed to www.dw-world.de, and was changed again in 2012, to www.dw.de. Deutsche Welle purchased the domain dw.com, which previously belonged to DiamondWare, in 2013; DW had attempted to claim ownership of the address in 2000, without success. DW eventually moved to the www.dw.com domain on 22 June 2015. According to DW, their website delivers information by topic with an intuitive navigation organized to meet users' expectations. The layout offers more flexibility to feature pictures, videos, and in-depth reporting on the day's events in a multimedia and multilingual fashion. They also integrated their Media Center into the dw.de website making it easier for users to access videos, audio, and picture galleries from DW's multimedia archive of reports, programs, and coverage of special issues.

DW's news site is in seven core languages (Arabic, Chinese, English, German, Spanish, Portuguese for Brazil, and Russian), as well as a mixture of news and information in 23 other languages in which Deutsche Welle broadcasts. Persian became the site's eighth focus language in 2007.

German and European news is DW's central focus, but the site also offers background information about German and German language courses. Deutsch, Warum Nicht? (literally: German, Why Not?) is a personal course for learning the German language, created by Deutsche Welle and the Goethe-Institut.

In 2003, the German government passed a new "Deutsche Welle Act", which defined DW as a tri-media organization, making the Deutsche Welle website an equal partner with DW-TV and DW Radio. The website is available in 30 languages but focuses on German, English, Spanish, Russian, Brazilian Portuguese, Chinese, and Arabic. Persian became the eighth focus language in 2007.

In March 2009, DW-TV expanded its television services in Asia with two new channels, namely DW-TV Asia and DW-TV Asia+. DW-TV Asia (DW-TV Asien in German) contains 16 hours of German programming and 8 hours in English, whilst DW-TV Asia+ contains 18 hours of English programmes plus 6 hours of German programmes.

In August 2009, DW-TV's carriage in the United Kingdom on Sky channel 794 ceased, although the channel continues to be available via other European satellites receivable in the UK.

In 2011, DW announced a significant reduction of service including the closure of most of its FM services in the Balkans (except for Romani), but that it would expand its network of FM partners in Africa. The radio production for Hausa, Kiswahili, French, and Portuguese for Africa was optimized for FM broadcasts. DW also produces a regional radio magazine in English daily, which is to be rebroadcast by African partners.

Audio content in Arabic is distributed online, via mobile, or rebroadcast by partners.

DW announced it would focus on FM partnerships for Bengali, Urdu, Dari/Pashtu, and Indonesian for South Asia, India, Pakistan, and Afghanistan.

On 1 November 2011, DW discontinued shortwave broadcasts in German, Russian, Persian, and Indonesian and ended its English service outside Africa. Chinese programming was reduced from 120 minutes to 60 minutes a week. As of November 2011, DW only broadcast radio programming via shortwave in Amharic, Chinese, Dari, English, and French for Africa, Hausa, Kiswahili, Pashtu, Portuguese for Africa and Urdu.

=== Rebranding television news ===
On 22 June 2015, DW TV launched a 24-hour English-language news channel with a new design and a new studio as part of a rebrand to DW News. Previously, DW's news programmes were called Journal and broadcast in English in 3-, 15- and 30-minute blocks. The new channel offers 30-minute updates every hour and 60-minute programmes twice a day on weekdays. DW News broadcasts from Berlin but frequently has live social media segments hosted from a specially designed studio in Bonn. The German, Spanish, and Arabic channels also received a new design.

At the same time, DW's news website moved from a .de URL to .com and added a social media stream to its front page. The refreshed DW services were launched under the tagline 'Made for Minds'.

=== Plans for the future ===
Deutsche Welle has developed a two-tier approach that they are using for the future growth of their company which consists of a global approach and a regional approach. Within their global approach, DW has now made plans to boost its competitiveness market throughout the world with news and television coverage. The plan implements covering almost all regions of the world with two television channels in each region. With some exclusions, the entire world will be covered. Hours covered range throughout regions and the coverage will be in German, English, Spanish, and Arabic.

The regional approach looks at marketing over the Internet to offer news coverage in languages other than the four being offered. With updates on DW's website news will be better tailored to each region. Over time, they plan to diversify their online coverage with more regional content being covered.

Deutsche Welle's budget for 2016 was 301.8 million euros.

On 25 February 2018, DW-TV published "The Climate Cover Up – Big Oil's Campaign of Deception" (2018) after documents confirmed big oil companies have known the burning of fossil fuels impacts climate since 1957.

== Funding ==
Deutsche Welle is funded from federal grants taken from the federal tax revenue.

Since the reorganisation of broadcasting as a result of German reunification, Deutsche Welle has been the only remaining broadcasting corporation under federal law. In contrast to the national public broadcasters, which are financed by the license fee the ARD state broadcasters, Deutschlandradio and ZDF, it is not financed through the broadcasting fee, but from federal taxes. The Ministry for Culture and Media is responsible for the financing, which in turn allows the DW to offer a broadcast with low to nonexistent advertising time.

== Censorship ==
=== Venezuela ===
On 10 April 2019, DW announced that Venezuela's state telecoms regulator Conatel had halted its Spanish-language channel. By 15 April, the broadcasting service was restored.

=== Russia ===
In 2019, the Russian Ministry of Foreign Affairs accused DW of calling on Russians to take part in recent anti-government protests and threatened it would take action against the outlet under domestic law if it made such calls again. Shortly after, the Russian Parliament accused DW of breaking election legislation and asked the foreign ministry to consider revoking the German broadcaster's right to work in the country. By November, Russian Foreign Minister Sergei Lavrov declared he did not support banning foreign media outlets.

On 3 February 2022, in retaliation to Germany's broadcasting regulator's decision to ban the transmission of the Russian state-run RT Deutsch channel over a lack of a broadcasting license, the Russian foreign ministry said that it would shut down DW's Moscow bureau, strip all DW staff of their accreditation and terminate broadcasting of DW in Russia. The Moscow office of Deutsche Welle was informed that it would be shut at 9:00 on Friday, 4 February 2022. DW made plans to relocate Moscow operations to the Latvian capital, Riga. On 28 March, the Russian Ministry of Justice designated DW as a "foreign agent".

In December 2025, DW was added to Russia's list of undesirable organizations. Shortly after, DW launched a new Russian-language TikTok channel as a response.

=== Belarus ===
In March 2022, a Belarusian court recognized the Telegram channel "DW Belarus" and the Deutsche Welle logo as extremist materials. In April 2024, the Ministry of Internal Affairs of the Republic of Belarus labeled DW Belarus as an extremist group.

=== Turkey ===
On 30 June 2022, DW was banned in Turkey upon the request of Radio and Television Supreme Council (RTÜK). RTÜK ordered DW in February 2022 to pay the license fee or to terminate their service in Turkey.

=== Iran ===
In October 2022, Iran sanctioned DW Farsi for coverage of 2022 Iranian protests. Iran's Foreign Ministry announced the sanctions in a statement, accusing those listed of "supporting terrorism".

== Logos ==
First logo (1953)

Second logo (1992–1995), introduced following the start of Deutsche Welle TV in 1992

Third logo (1995–2003)

Fourth logo (2003–2012)

Fifth and current logo (2012–present)

== Interval signal ==
Deutsche Welle's interval signal

The network's interval signal is a version of the melody of "Es sucht der Bruder seine Brüder" from Fidelio by Ludwig van Beethoven.

== Broadcast languages ==
Language	Began	Ceased	Linear broadcast
German	1953		closed 1 January 2024
English *	1954		TV & Radio (also Saturday's football)
French *	1954		Radio (also Saturday's football)
Spanish	1954		TV (also Saturday's football on radio)
Portuguese	1954		Radio on weekdays (also Saturday's football)
Arabic	1959		TV (also Thursday's radio program "Iraq Today")
Persian	1962		
Turkish	1962		
Russian	1962		TV
Polish *	1962		
Czech *	1962	2000	
Slovak *	1962	2000	
Hungarian *	1962	2000–2021	
Serbo-Croatian *	1962	1992	
Swahili	1963		Radio (also Saturday's football)
Hausa	1963		Radio (also Saturday's football)
Indonesian	1963		
Bulgarian	1963		
Romanian *	1963		
Slovene	1963	2000	
Modern Greek	1964		Radio
Hindi	1964		
Bengali	1964		
Urdu	1964		
Italian *	1964	1998	
Chinese	1965		
Amharic	1965		Radio
Sanskrit	1966	1998	
Japanese	1969	2000	
Macedonian	1969		
Pashto	1970		
Dari	1970		
Serbian	1992		
Croatian	1992		
Albanian	1992		
Bosnian	1997		
Danish *	1965	1998	
Norwegian *	1965	1998	
Swedish *	1965	1998	
Dutch *	1967	1998	
Ukrainian	2000		
Belarusian	2005	2011–2020	
Tamil	2021		
Georgian	2026		

* partly by Deutschlandfunk (until 1993)

== Broadcasting ==
The main distribution of DW programs is by satellite transmissions, internet stream and re-broadcasting by local FM radio stations. Historically, shortwave broadcasts were the main distribution channel of international broadcasters, as for Deutsche Welle.

For parts of Africa where DW believes many people can still be reached via radio, DW broadcasts programs via shortwave.

The TV program is distributed via various satellite channels and fed into cable networks. It is also available as a live stream on the DW website and in the ARD media library. Since 2019, DW has been providing its websites as an onion service via the Tor network in order to circumvent censorship measures by non-democratic states.

Deutsche Welle was heavily involved in technological research initiatives to adapt shortwave transmission to today's standards through the use of digital technology. DW favored the technology of the Digital Radio Mondiale consortium. In 2008, it started the BBC & DW project with the British BBC. However, this was soon discontinued due to a lack of success on the listener side.

=== Shortwave relay stations ===
In the so-called 'golden era' of shortwave radio at the time of the cold war, DW had a number of shortwave relay stations in south-east Asia, Africa and Europe.

- Trincomalee, Sri Lanka (1984 to 2013) was sold to Sri Lanka Broadcasting Cooperation
  - 3 × 250 kW short wave transmitters
  - 1 × 400 kW medium wave transmitter
  - 20 antennas (to be verified)
- Kigali, Rwanda: A relay station in Kigali, Rwanda, was inaugurated on 30 August 1963, and provided coverage for Africa. This relay station closed on 28 March 2015.
  - 4 × 250 kW shortwave transmitters
- Sines, Portugal closed on 30 October 2011 and was due to be dismantled after a few months.
  - 3 × 250 kW shortwave transmitters
- Radio Antilles, Montserrat

DW used a relay station in Malta that had three SW and one 600 kW MW transmitter and gave partial coverage of the Americas, southern Asia and the far east. It was inaugurated on 29 July 1974 in exchange for a grant of almost 1 million GBP. The station closed in January 1996.

Formerly, DW shared a transmitting station on Antigua in the Caribbean with the BBC. It was inaugurated on 1 November 1976 and closed on 31 March 2005. It had a relay-exchange with the Canadian Broadcasting Corporation that allowed DW to use two 250 kW transmitters in Sackville, New Brunswick, until that facility closed down in 2012.

In July 2011, Deutsche Welle began implementing a major reform. The main changes have been a radical reduction of shortwave radio broadcasting—from a daily total of 260 to 55 hours—and an expansion of television broadcasting.

DW was ended shortwave broadcasting on 31 December 2025.

=== Relay stations leasing transmitter time to DW ===
In 2013, DW leased time on the following relay stations:

- Woofferton, United Kingdom (BBC World Service)
- Kranji, Singapore (BBC Far Eastern Relay Station)
- Dhabayya, United Arab Emirates (United Emirates Radio)
- Nakhon Sawan, Thailand (BBC East Asian Relay Station)
- Ascension Island (BBC Atlantic Relay Station)
- Meyerton, South Africa (Sentech)

== Personnel ==
=== Directors-General ===
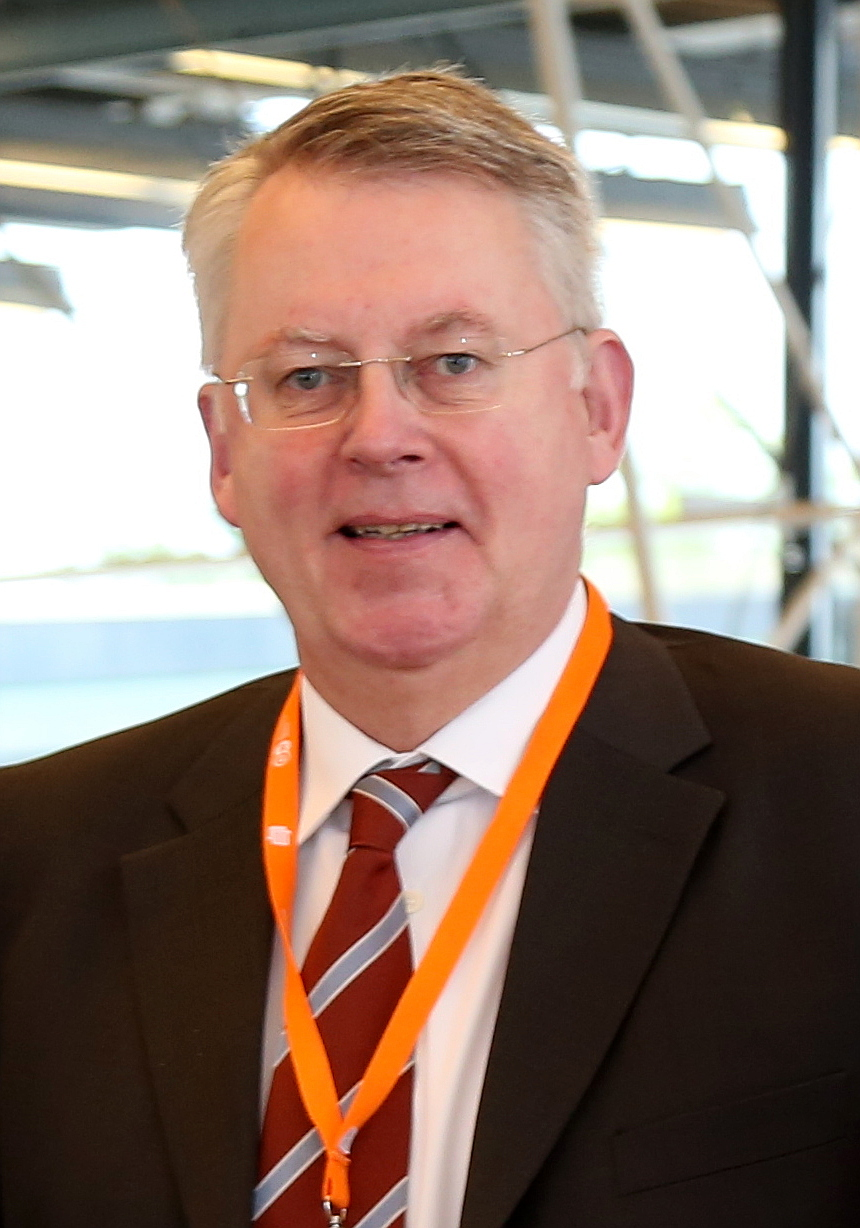
Peter Limbourg, in 2016

- 12 October 1960 – 29 February 1969: Hans Otto Wesemann
- 1 March 1969 – 29 February 1982: Walter Steigner
- 1 March 1982 – 8 December 1984: Conrad Ahlers
- 8 December 1984 – 30 June 1986: Heinz Fellhauer (interim)
- 1 July 1986 – 30 June 1987: Klaus Schütz
- 1 July 1987 – 30 June 1990: Heinz Fellhauer
- 1 July 1990 – 31 March 2002: Dieter Weirich
- 1 April 2002 – 30 September 2002: Reinhard Hartstein (interim as deputy intendant)
- 1 October 2001 – 30 September 2013: Erik Bettermann
- 1 October 2013 – 30 September 2025: Peter Limbourg
- From 1 October 2025: Barbara Massing

=== Presenters ===
- Tim Sebastian
- Edith Kimani
- Sarah Kelly
- Phil Gayle
- Brent Goff
- Nicole Frölich

== DW Akademie ==
DW Akademie is Deutsche Welle's international center for media development, media consulting and journalism training. It offers training and consulting services to partners around the world. It works with broadcasters, media organizations, and universities especially in developing and transitioning countries to promote free and independent media. The work is funded mainly by the German Federal Ministry of Economic Cooperation and Development. Additional sponsors are the German Foreign Office and the European Union.

DW Akademie's journalism traineeship is an 18-month program for young journalists that provides editorial training in the three areas in which Deutsche Welle produces content: radio, television and online. It is aimed at aspiring journalists from Germany as well as from regions to which Deutsche Welle broadcasts.

The "International Media Studies" Master's Program, offered in cooperation with the University of Bonn and the University Bonn-Rhein-Sieg of Applied Sciences, is based at DW Akademie. The four-semester program combines the disciplines of media development, media regulation, and communications. The seminars are held in English and German and the degree is aimed at media representatives from developing and transitioning countries.

Carsten von Nahmen became head of DW Akademie in September 2018. He had been DW's senior correspondent in Washington since February 2017 and prior to this, deputy editor-in-chief and head of DW's main news department since 2014. Christian Gramsch was director of DW Akademie from November 2013 until May 2018, and prior to this DW's regional director for multimedia. He succeeded DW Akademie director Gerda Meuer, who had previously been deputy editor-in-chief of Deutsche Welle's radio program, and had earlier worked for various media outlets and as a correspondent for Inter News service. Ute Schaeffer has been DW Akademie's deputy head since 2014 and was previously Deutsche Welle's editor-in-chief.

== Learn German section ==
Deutsche Welle's website has a section dedicated to providing material for those who are interested in learning the German language at all levels based on the Common European Framework of Reference for Languages. They offer free video and audio courses with access to exercises and transcripts. Users can also search for suitable courses and test which level they are at. Among the material available on their site, they offer free access to an animated series called "Harry Lost in Time" (Harry gefangen in der Zeit), for beginners. Through Flash animation, the series tells the story of a fictional character named Harry Walkott, a man who is struck by lightning in the Black Forest during his vacation in Germany and, because of this, becomes stuck in time, with the same day repeating over and over. With an English narration, the series introduces German expressions, words and grammar explanations, and also provides exercises for the user.

== DW Freedom of Speech Award ==
The DW Freedom of Speech Award was established in 2015, to honour "a media person or initiative that has shown outstanding promotion of freedom rights".

=== Winners ===
- 2015: Raif Badawi, Saudi Arabia
- 2016: Sedat Ergin, Turkey
- 2017: White House Correspondents' Association (WHCA), USA
- 2018: Sadegh Zibakalam, Iran
- 2019: Anabel Hernández, Mexico
- 2020: Fact-checkers fighting the infodemic in times of COVID-19
- 2021: Tobore Ovuorie, Nigeria
- 2022: Mstyslav Chernov and Evgeniy Maloletka
- 2023: Óscar Martínez
- 2024: Yulia Navalnaya and the Russian Anti-Corruption Foundation (ACF)
- 2025: Tamar Kintsurashvili
- 2026: Jimmy Lai

== Controversies ==
Reporting from The Guardian in January 2020 raised allegations of "sexual harassment, racism, antisemitism, and severe bullying" within the organization.

On 5 December 2021, Deutsche Welle announced that it would suspend its partnership with a Jordanian partner, Roya TV, on account of antisemitic and anti-Israel content published on Roya's social media. Guido Baumhauer, a senior executive with DW, apologized, saying: "We are truly sorry that we did not notice these disgusting images." Roya TV rejected the accusation and said it was the target of a "hostile campaign" by unnamed parties.

In November 2021, Süddeutsche Zeitung published an investigation into social media comments allegedly made by members of DW's Arabic service, including posts that appeared to downplay the Holocaust or perpetuate anti-Jewish stereotypes. On 3 December 2021, DW announced during an external investigation into the allegations, led by former German Justice Minister Sabine Leutheusser-Schnarrenberger and psychologist Ahmad Mansour, that it was suspending four employees and one freelancer. On 7 February, this investigation concluded that DW was correct to suspend these five employees, and recommended further action against eight other employees; it also recommended ending cooperation agreements with some Middle East-based news outlets, but concluded that there was no "structural antisemitism" at DW. Following the report, DW terminated the contracts of several other employees, including the former bureau chief in Beirut, who advocated the execution of "anyone who has to do with the Israelis", an employee who claimed that Israel controls people's brains "through art, media and music", and a third journalist had posted "the Holocaust is a lie." Several of those fired stated that they had not been given a chance to defend their case, criticized DW's lack of clarity regarding guidelines for what constituted antisemitism, and said they felt they were being censored in what they could write about the Israeli-Palestinian conflict.

In September 2022, Farah Maraqa, one of seven Arab employees of DW fired in February, subsequently sued DW and won her case. The court ruled that her dismissal on charges of anti-semitism was "legally unjustified". A former colleague, Maram Salem, won her case in July against DW for unlawful termination, ruling that her Facebook posts were not anti-semitic.

Also in September 2022, Deutsche Welle updated its Code of Conduct to include "Germany's historical responsibility for the Holocaust is also a reason for which we support the right of Israel to exist" among their values and noted that antisemitism is grounds for dismissal. The updated code of conduct is thought to improve Deutsche Welle's chances of successfully terminating antisemitic employees in the future.

In August 2023, The New Arab published the results of a year long internal investigation by the Palestinian news website Arab48 which concluded that Arab employees were unfairly dismissed over largely spurious antisemitism charges.

== See also ==
- BBC
- CNN International
- Euronews
- France 24
- RT
- KBS World
- InfoMigrants
- Karin Helmstaedt – DW presenter for the Euromaxx culture and lifestyle show
- Max Hofmann – Brussels Bureau Chief for DW in Belgium
- Television in Germany
- List of world news channels
