= Magdalene Odundo =

Kenyan-born British studio potter (born 1950)

Dame Magdalene Odundo DBE
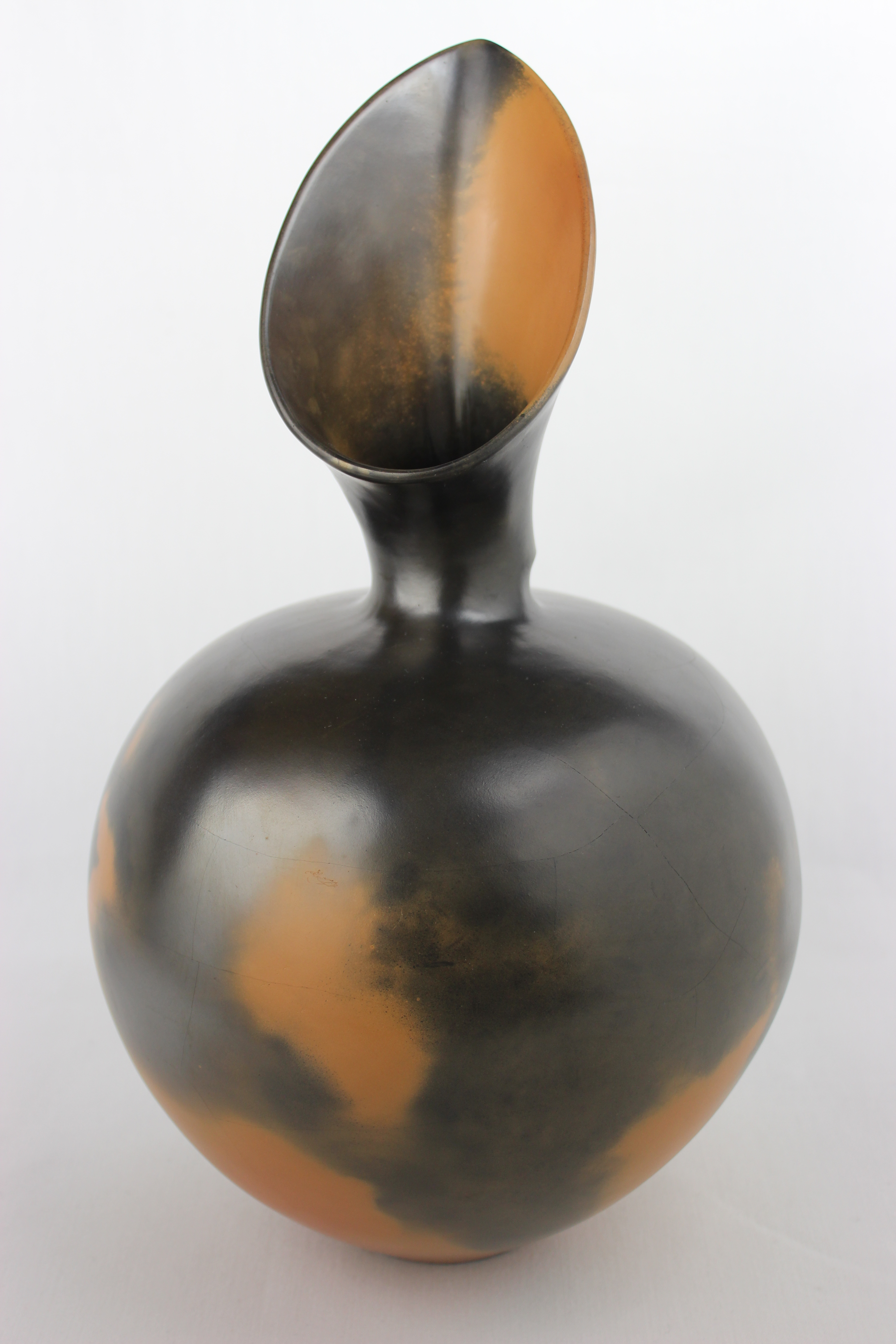
- Untitled Burnished, reduction fired pot by Magdalene Odundo. From the W.A. Ismay Collection at York Art Gallery
- Born: Magdalene Anyango Namakhiya Odundo; 1950 (age 75–76); Nairobi, Kenya
- Education: West Surrey College of Art & Design; Royal College of Art
- Occupations: Graphic artist, ceramicist and potter
- Known for: Studio pottery

Dame Magdalene Anyango Namakhiya Odundo DBE (born 1950) is a Kenyan-born British studio potter, who now lives in Farnham, Surrey, England. Her work is in the collections of notable museums including the Art Institute of Chicago, The British Museum, The Metropolitan Museum of Art, and the National Museum of African Art.

She has been Chancellor of the University for the Creative Arts since 2018.

== Early life and education ==
Magdalene Odundo was born in 1950 in Nairobi, Kenya, and received her early education in both India and Kenya. She attended the Kabete National Polytechnic in Kenya to study Graphics and Commercial Art and later moved to England in 1971 to follow her chosen vocation in Graphic Design. After training in Farnham, Surrey, she completed her qualifications in foundation art and graphics at the Cambridge School of Art, where she began to specialise in ceramics.

After a while in England, she discovered pottery, and in 1974–75 she visited Nigeria, visiting the Pottery Training Centre in Abuja, and Kenya to study traditional hand-built pottery techniques. She also travelled to San Ildefonso Pueblo, New Mexico, to observe the making of black-burnished vessels. In 1976, Odundo received a BA degree from West Surrey College of Art & Design (now University for the Creative Arts). She then earned a master's degree at the Royal College of Art in London. She taught at the Commonwealth Institute in London from 1976 to 1979 and at the Royal College of Art in London from 1979 to 1982, before returning to teach at Surrey Institute of Art & Design (now University for the Creative Arts) in 1997, becoming Professor of Ceramics in 2001.

In March 2016, she was inaugurated as an Emerita Professor of the University for the Creative Arts, with a celebration event held at the Farnham campus against the backdrop of her important work in glass, Transition II. She lives and works in Surrey.

== Career ==
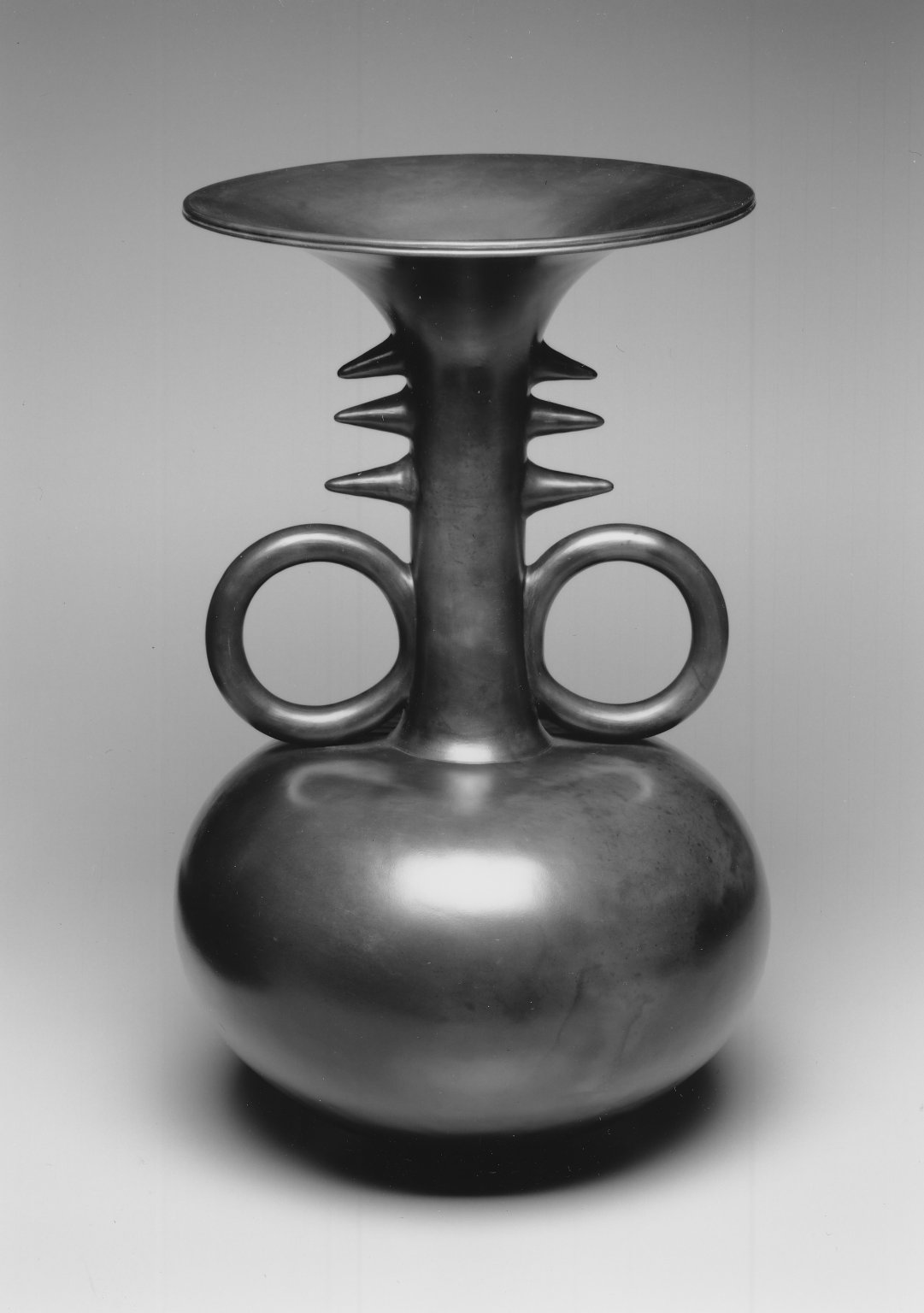
Vase, 1990, Brooklyn Museum

Odundo's best-known ceramics are hand-built, using a coiling technique. Each piece is burnished, covered with slip, and then burnished again. The pieces are fired in an oxidizing atmosphere, which turns them red-orange. A second firing in an oxygen-poor (reducing) atmosphere causes the clay to turn black; this is known as reduction-firing. She uses the same types of techniques used by the Ancient Greeks and Romans and likes to take inspiration from countries such as China and Mexico. Her graphic design skills still remain with her as she often sketches her interest in natural forms and the design of form to help her with her ceramic creations. Many of the vessels Odundo creates are reminiscent of the human form, often following the curves of the spine, stomach, or hair. Furthermore, the shape of expression of her vessels are symbolic of the female body; one of her most famous pieces is a black and ocher vessel with a curved base and elongated neck resembling the form of a pregnant woman. Her work is now a part of permanent collections of nearly 50 international museums, including:

- Art Institute of Chicago
- The British Museum, London
- The Metropolitan Museum of Art, New York
- Cooper-Hewitt, National Design Museum, New York
- National Museum of African Art, Washington DC
- Toledo Museum of Art, Toledo, OH
- Museum für Kunst und Gewerbe Hamburg, Hamburg
- The Hepworth Wakefield, Wakefield

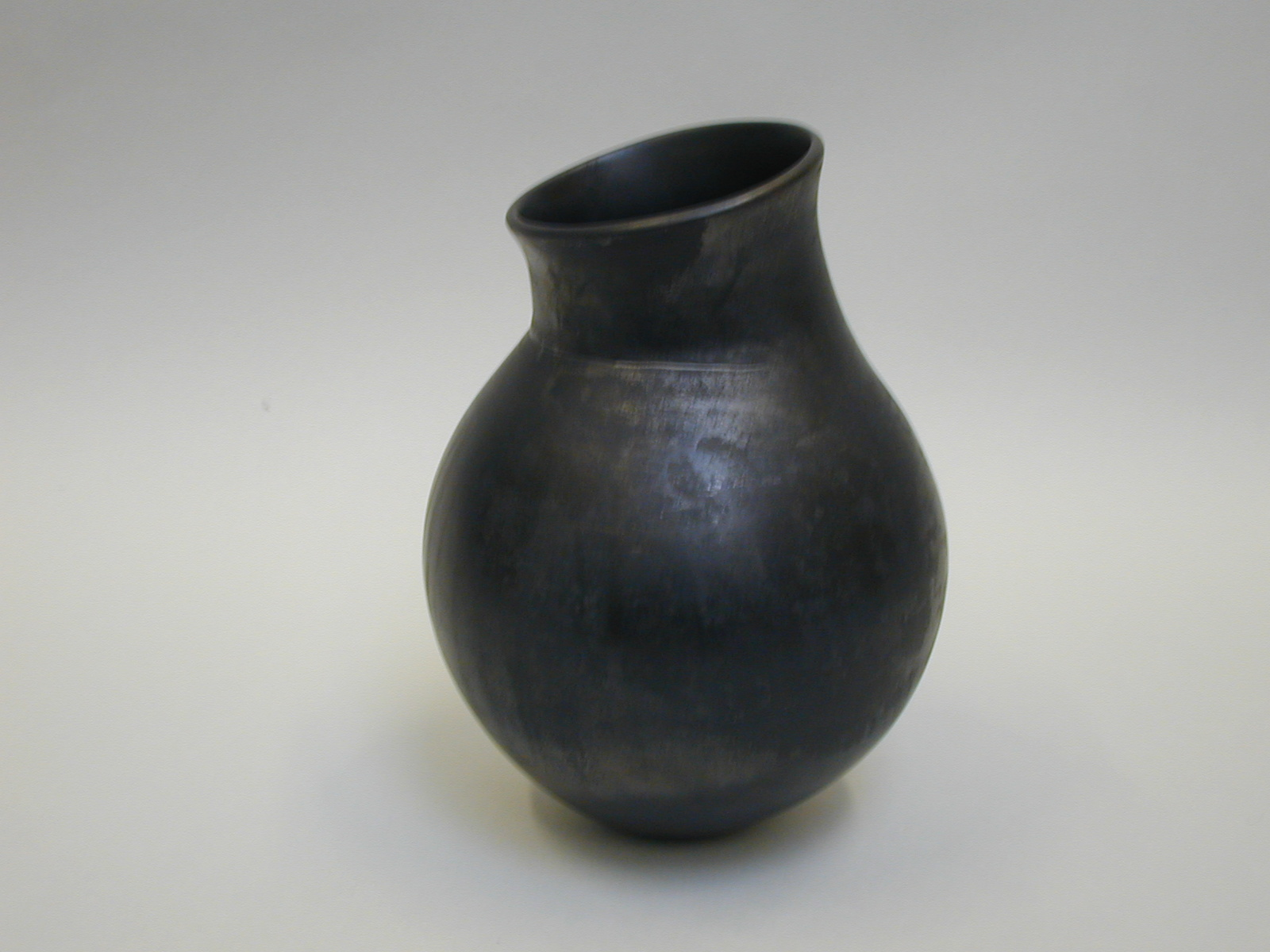
Burnished Jar by Magdalene Odundo. From the W. A. Ismay Collection at York Art Gallery

In 2006, her work was presented in an exhibition titled Resonance and Inspiration at the Samuel P. Harn Museum of Art of the University of Florida. This was her first solo exhibition in the US since 1997 and her first solo appearance in Florida. This exhibit was also the first time her drawings and sketches were presented alongside her vessels. Her free-form drawing style replicates the same shape and form as her vessels, serving as a glimpse into how Odundo perceives her three-dimensional works in two dimensions.

In 2019, there was a major exhibition that centred on a group of more than 50 of her works, alongside other works of art that Odundo saw as relating to or influencing her work; the exhibition was titled The Journey of Things. The show was displayed in two locations: The Hepworth Wakefield, West Yorkshire and then the Sainsbury Centre for Visual Arts, East Anglia.

Her work was included in the 2024 exhibition Making Their Mark: Works from the Shah Garg Collection at the Berkeley Art Museum and Pacific Film Archive (BAMPFA).

== Recognition and honours ==
Odundo has been recognized as a significant player in contemporary ceramics, making her name a large contributor to African Art in the US during the 1990s. As observed by curator Augustus Casely-Hayford, "[She draws] on something of the wisdom and experience of the Leach, or a line borrowed from ancient European antiquity, to create a trans-global, trans-temporal visual system of her own; modern, yet simultaneously old, African yet resolutely European..."

She was appointed Officer of the Order of the British Empire (OBE) for services to art in the 2008 Birthday Honours

Odundo also received the African Art Recognition Award by Detroit Institute of Arts in 2008, and in 2012 the African Heritage Outstanding Achievement in the Arts award, as well as subsequent honorary doctorates from the University of Florida (2014) and University of the Arts London (2016).

In 2017, it was announced that Odundo would take up the role of Chancellor of the University for the Creative Arts from June 2018.

She was appointed Dame Commander of the Order of the British Empire (DBE) in the 2020 New Year Honours for services to art and arts education.

In 2022, she was awarded an Honorary Doctorate of Arts by Anglia Ruskin University.

Odundo was awarded the 2023 Lifetime Achievement Medal by the London Design Festival.
