= First Channel =

First Channel may refer to:

- First Channel (Georgian TV channel)
- Channel One Russia
- Pershyi Natsionalnyi, Ukraine
- Public Television Company of Armenia
