= Hürriyet Daily News =

English-language newspaper in Turkey

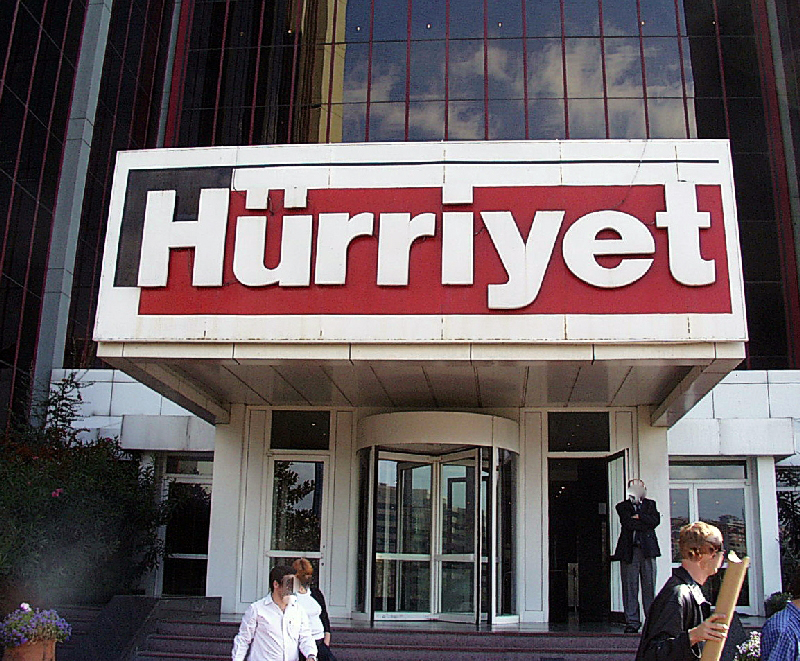
- Type: Daily newspaper
- Format: Broadsheet
- Owner: Demirören Media Group
- Editor: Gökçe Aytulu
- Founded: March 1961
- Political alignment: Centre-right; Historical: Centre-left; Political liberalism
- Headquarters: Hürriyet Medya Towers, Güneşli, 34212 Istanbul, Turkey
- ISSN: 1300-0721
- Website: hurriyetdailynews.com

The Hürriyet Daily News, formerly Hürriyet Daily News and Economic Review and Turkish Daily News, is the oldest current English-language daily in Turkey, founded in 1961. The paper was bought by the Doğan Media Group in 2001 and has been under the media group's flagship Hürriyet from 2006; both papers were sold to Demirören Holding in 2018, owned by Yildirim Demiroren, a close ally of Erdogan.

== Ideology ==
Hürriyet Daily News has generally taken a secular and liberal or centre-left position on most political issues, in contrast to Turkey's other main English-language daily, the Daily Sabah, which is closely aligned with the Justice and Development Party of Recep Tayyip Erdoğan. Another conservative competitor, the Gülen movement-run Today's Zaman, was shut down by the government following the 2016 Turkish coup d'état attempt.

In May 2018, the new Erdoğan-aligned owners appointed a new editor and publisher and stated that they intended to run the paper as an independent, non-partisan voice, in implicit contrast to both its previous secular orientation and the Daily Sabah.

== Editor ==
The current editor-in-chief is Gökçe Aytulu, who replaced Murat Yetkin in October 2018.

== Columnists ==
The paper contains domestic, regional, and international news coverage, economic and cultural reporting, as well as regular opinion pieces from leading Turkish journalists and thinkers such as Mehmet Ali Birand, Soner Çağaptay, Nuray Mert, Mustafa Akyol, İlhan Tanir, Burak Bekdil, Sedat Ergin, Semih İdiz, and former editor David Judson.
