= Edith Kìmani =

Kenyan media personality and journalist

Edith Kimani
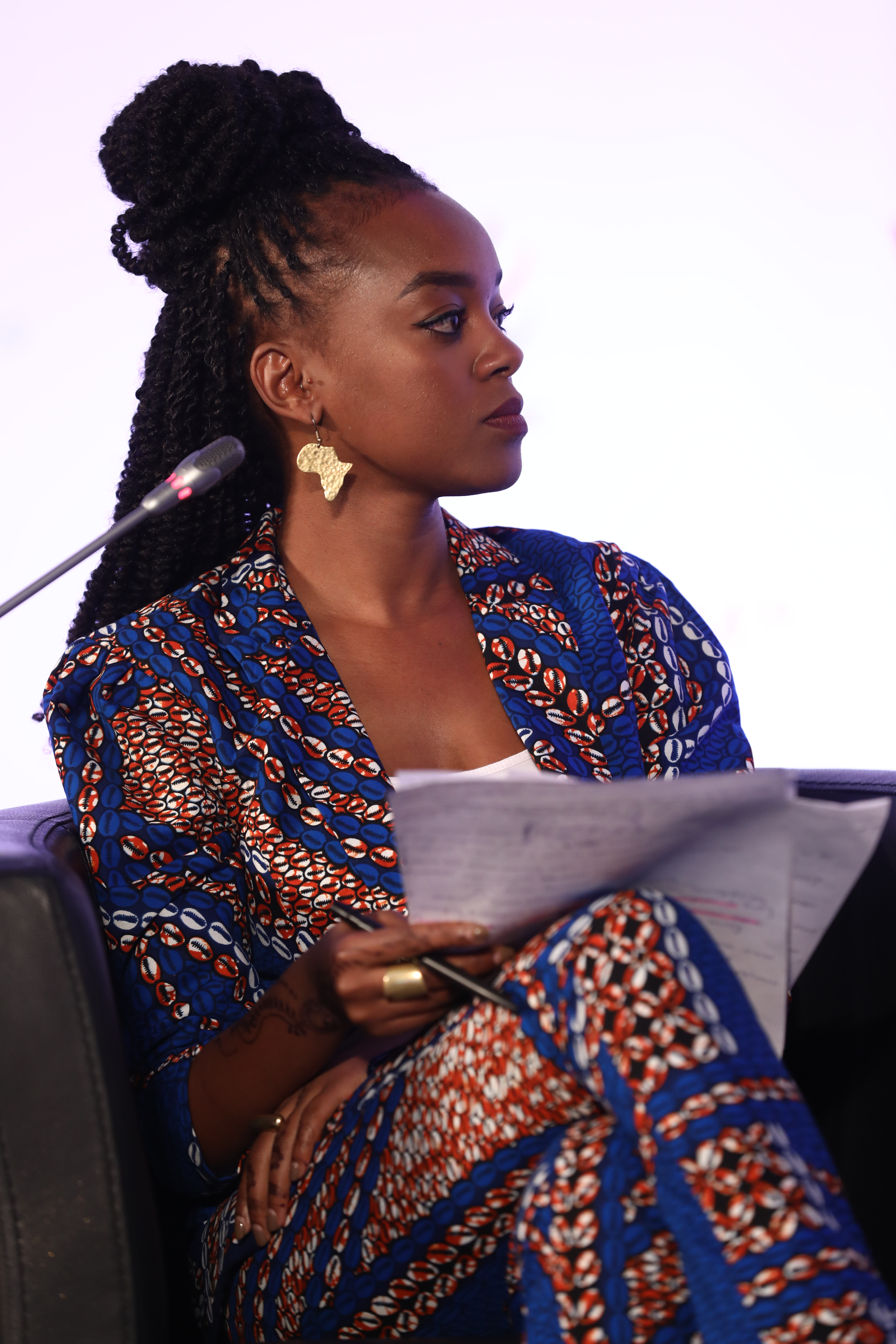
- Kimani in 2019
- Born: Kenya
- Education: United States International University-Africa
- Occupations: News presenter, Reporter

Edith Kimani is a Kenyan media personality and journalist. She works at German international broadcasting service Deutsche Welle (DW) as a news anchor and reporter where she covers politics and social issues across Africa, while focusing on youth and climate change. She was previously the East African correspondent reporting on environmental issues, and she hosted the DW's show Eco@Africa. She currently hosts a youth show called The 77 percent.

== Early life and education ==
Kìmani was born and raised in Kinoo, Kiambu. She later went to Forest View Academy in Karen for primary school before moving to Westlands primary school at class four, where she did her Kenya Certificate of Primary Education, and later went to high school at State House Girls School in Nairobi. While at State House Girls secondary school, she excelled in acting and drama and was offered a scholarship to join Hillcrest International School, where she did her Kenya Certificate of Secondary Education (KCSE). She later joined the United States International University-Africa, where she studied international relations.

At the age of 19, she participated in a talent search show for aspiring journalists called The Presenter that was airing on Kenya Television Network (KTN). She won the competition and was hired as a reporter and anchor at the TV station owned by Standard Group PLC. She worked there for seven years before resigning to become an East African correspondent at the German station Deutsche Welle. She was later promoted to become a news anchor and hosts a youth show called The 77 percent.

Kìmani hosted DW's Global Media Forum in June 2019 as well as the 2019 World Economic Forum on Africa in South Africa. She also moderated a discussion session at the World Trade Organization's public forum in Switzerland.
