= 2TV =

2TV may refer to:

- 2TV (TV programme), an Irish music television programme broadcast between 1995 and 2001
- 2TV (Lithuanian TV channel), a television channel in Lithuania
- First Channel — Teleschool, a television channel in Georgia, also known as 2TV
