= Esther Nyaiyaki =

Kenyan lawyer

- Born: 7 January 1945 (age 81); Nairobi, Kenya
- Education: University of Nairobi; (Bachelor of Laws); (Master of Laws); Kenya School of Law; (Postgraduate Diploma in Law)
- Occupations: Lawyer and Supreme Court Registrar
- Years active: 2000 to 2021
- Title: Registrar at the Supreme Court of Kenya

Esther Nyaiyaki, is a Kenyan lawyer who works as a Registrar in the Kenya Judiciary. She served as the Registrar of the Supreme Court of Kenya from February 2013 to December 2021 and was involved in handling the petition that led to the annulment of the election of Uhuru Kenyatta as president of Kenya, in August 2017. She serves as a Registrar in the Office of the Chief Registrar of the Judiciary from January 2022.

== Background and education ==
She was born in Kenya and attended Kenyan schools for her primary school education. She studied at Kenya High School for both her O-Level and A-Level schooling. She was admitted to the University of Nairobi, where she studied law, graduating with a Bachelor of Laws (LLB) degree. Later, the same university awarded her a Master of Laws (LLM) degree, specializing in international conflict management. She also holds a Postgraduate Diploma in Law, awarded by the Kenya School of Law

== Career ==
Esther Nyaiyaki joined the Judiciary of Kenya in February 2013. Immediately before joining the Judiciary, she worked as a senior editor at the National Council for Law Reporting.

== August 2017 Presidential Election Petition ==
In August 2017, when Raila Odinga challenged the election of Uhuru Kenyatta to the position of president of Kenya, Ms. Nyaiyaki personally supervised the filing of the relevant paperwork, in her capacity as registrar of the Supreme Court. The Justices of the Supreme Court, led by Chief Justice David Maraga tasked Nyaiyaki to conduct an audit of the materials that the Independent Electoral and Boundaries Commission (IEBC) used to declare the presidential result. She was assisted by a team of ICT experts, appointed by the Judiciary to examine the relevant materials.

In its report to the Supreme court, Ms. Nyaiyaki's team established that the presidential election was fraught with massive irregularities, including over 560 non-gazetted polling stations in addition to the 40,883 legally recognized locations. Other irregularities included forms 34As used to declare the presidential winner. Many of these forms were duplicated, some were carbon copies, others appeared to be photocopies, others did not bear the requisite stamps, some did not have serial numbers and still others were not signed, all being contrary to the law.

The supreme court took into consideration that report, before they annulled the presidential election on 1 September 2017, in a 4 to 2 decision. Following that annulment, the Ethics and Anti-Corruption Commission initiated an inquiry into the actions of Esther Nyaiyaki, after one Kenyan citizen filed a complaint. This was followed by a flurry of exchanges between various Kenya government agencies regarding the merits and legality of what had transpired.

The Kenyan Judiciary defended her actions, allowing her to keep her office until December 2021 when she was moved to the Office of the Chief Registrar of the Judiciary.

== See also ==
- Teodosia Osir
- Kellen Kariuki
- Iddah Asin
- Angela Ndambuki
