= Angela Ndambuki =

Kenyan lawyer, recording artist and corporate executive

- Born: 1980 (age 45–46); Mombasa, Kenya
- Citizenship: Kenya
- Education: University of Nairobi (Bachelor of Laws); Kenya School of Law (Postgraduate Diploma in Law); University of Edinburgh (Master of Laws)
- Occupations: Lawyer and Corporate executive
- Years active: 2001 to present
- Title: Regional Director for Sub-Saharan Africa at International Federation of the Phonographic Industry
- Spouse: (Roy Mutungi)

Angela Ndambuki (born in 1980), is a Kenyan lawyer and corporate executive. She was appointed as the Regional Director of the International Federation of the Phonographic Industry (IFPI) for Sub-Saharan Africa, effective July 2020. She is responsible for 46 countries, based in Nairobi.

Before that, from September 2017 until June 2020, she was the chief executive officer (CEO) of the Kenya National Chamber of Commerce and Industry. She previously was the CEO of the Performers Rights Society of Kenya (PRISK).

She is also an accomplished performing and recording artist, and was a member of the all-girl group called Tatuu. The group later separated for them to work on their individual projects.

== Background and education ==
Ndambuki was born in Mombasa, Kenya circa 1980, and attended local schools for her primary and secondary education. She obtained Bachelor of Laws (LLB) degree from the University of Nairobi. She also holds a Postgraduate Diploma in Law (Dip.Law), awarded by the Kenya School of Law. She is a member of the Kenya Bar. Her Master of Laws (LLM) degree specializing in intellectual property rights, was obtained from the University of Edinburgh, in Scotland.

== Career ==
In 1998, Ndambuki met Debbie Asila for the first time. The following year, she met Angela Mwandanda. They all had a passion to perform. The three became friends and started performing plays together, including at the French Cultural Centre and at the British Council in Nairobi, Kenya's capital city.

After passing the bar examinations, she and others founded the Performers Rights Society of Kenya (PRISK). In an interview with The Standard (Kenya) newspaper in October 2015, Ndambuki says that she worked for two years without a salary while cobbling the society together. She rose to the position of General Manager by January 2009, working in that capacity until October 2012. In November 2012, she was promoted to the position of CEO at PRISK, working in that capacity until September 2017.

== Family ==
Angela Ndambuki is married to Roy Mutungi, and they are the parents of two daughters. The elder was born c. 2007 and the younger c. 2013.

== Other considerations ==
In October 2017, she was named among "Top 40 Women Under 40 In Kenya 2017", by the Business Daily Africa newspaper, based in Nairobi, Kenya and published by the Nation Media Group.

== See also ==
- Borna Nyaoke-Anoke
- Kellen Kariuki
- Iddah Asin
- Flora Mutahi
