= Soner Cagaptay =

Turkish American political scientist

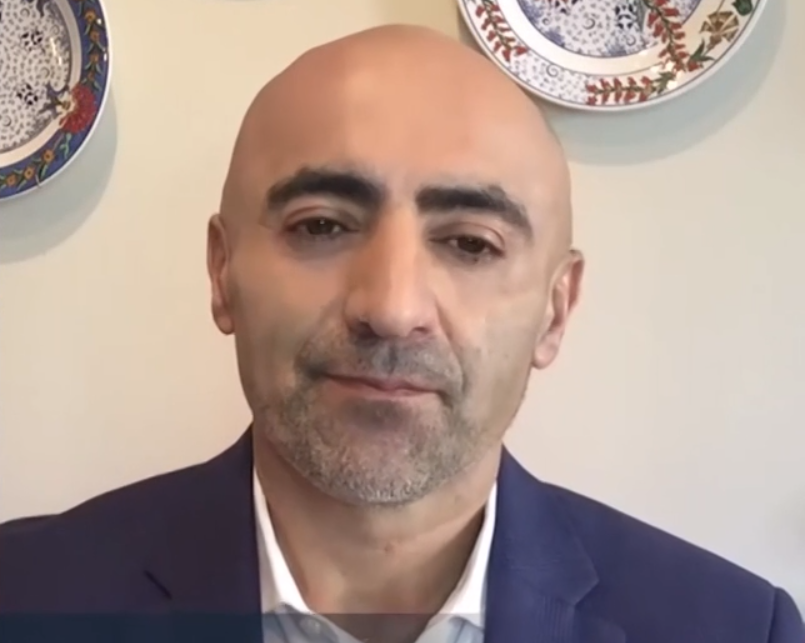
- Cagaptay in 2020
- Born: 1970 (age 55–56)

Signature
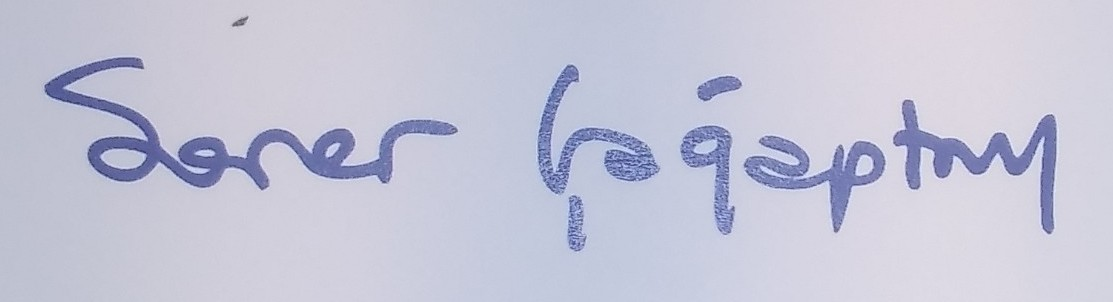

Soner Cagaptay (Turkish: Soner Çağaptay; born in 1970) is a Turkish-American political scientist based in the United States. He is director of the Turkish Research Program at the Washington Institute for Near East Policy. He specializes in Turkey–United States relations, Turkish politics, and Turkish nationalism.

== Education ==
Cagaptay received his Ph.D. degree in history from Yale University in 2003. He wrote his doctoral dissertation on Turkish nationalism.

== Career ==
Cagaptay is the Beyer Family fellow and director of the Turkish Research Program at The Washington Institute for Near East Policy (WINEP).

Cagaptay has taught courses at Yale, Princeton University, Georgetown University, and Smith College in the Middle East, Mediterranean, and Eastern Europe. From 2006-2007, he was Ertegun Professor at Princeton University's Department of Near Eastern Studies.

He was a visiting professor at the Edmund A. Walsh School of Foreign Service at Georgetown University and has spoken at Cornell University.

He has also served on contract as chair of the Turkey Advanced Area Studies Program at the State Department's Foreign Service Institute.

== In the media ==
Cagaptay has written on Turkey–United States relations; Turkish domestic politics; Turkish nationalism; Turkey's rise as an economic power and Ankara's Middle East policy, publishing in venues including the Wall Street Journal, New York Times, Washington Times, International Herald Tribune, Jane's Defence Weekly, and Habertürk. He is a regular columnist for Hürriyet Daily News, Turkey's oldest English-language paper, and a contributor to CNN's Global Public Square blog. His book Erdogan's Empire: Turkey and the Politics of the Middle East was published in September 2019 by I.B. Tauris. On February 16, 2022, he testified at a Helsinki Commission briefing entitled "Conflict of Interest? Foreign Policy and Human Rights in Turkey."

== Books ==
- A Sultan in Autumn: Erdogan Faces Turkey's Uncontainable Forces (2021). London: I.B. Tauris. ISBN 978-0-7556-4280-9.
- Erdogan's Empire: Turkey and the Politics of the Middle East (2019). London: I.B. Tauris. ISBN 978-1-78831-739-9. OCLC 1121097111
- The New Sultan: Erdogan and the Crisis of Modern Turkey (2017). London I.B. Tauris. ISBN 978-1-78453-826-2. OCLC 974880239.
- The Rise of Turkey: The Twenty-First Century's First Muslim Power (2014). Lincoln, NE: Potomac Books. ISBN 978-1-61234-651-9. OCLC 869736354
- Islam, Secularism and Nationalism in Modern Turkey: Who is a Turk? (2006). Milton Park, UK: Taylor & Francis. ISBN 978-1-134-17448-5. OCLC 1027167702

== Academic papers ==
- Cagaptay, Soner (2013). "Defining Turkish Power: Turkey as a Rising Power Embedded in the Western International System". Turkish Studies. 14 (4): 797–811. doi:10.1080/14683849.2013.861110. ISSN 1468-3849
- Cagaptay, Soner (2007). "Race, Assimilation and Kemalism: Turkish Nationalism and the Minorities in the 1930s". Middle Eastern Studies. 40 (3): 86–101. doi:10.1080/0026320042000213474. ISSN 0026-3206
- Çağaptay, Soner (2007). "Reconfiguring the Turkish nation in the 1930s". Nationalism and Ethnic Politics. 8 (2): 67–82. doi:10.1080/13537110208428662. ISSN 1353-7113
- Çağaptay, Soner (2003). "Citizenship policies in interwar Turkey*". Nations and Nationalism. 9 (4): 601–619. doi:10.1111/1469-8219.00129. ISSN 1469-8129
