= Njeri Rionge =

Kenyan technology entrepreneur (1966–2023)

Njeri Rionge OGW
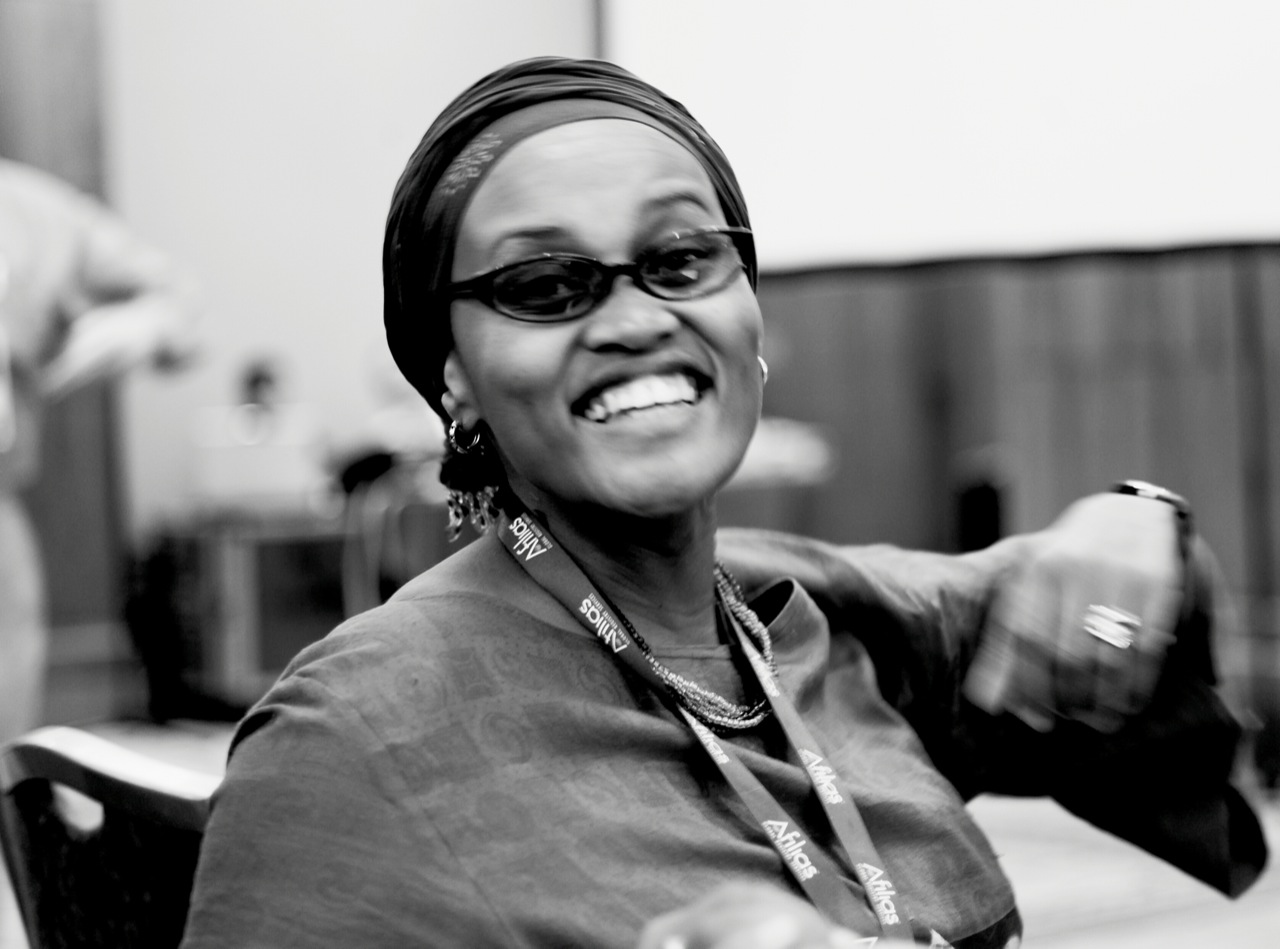
- Rionge in 2007
- Born: 12 January 1966; Nairobi, Kenya
- Died: 2 October 2023 (aged 57)
- Education: United States International University Africa
- Occupation: technology entrepreneur
- Known for: co-founding Wananchi Online Limited (WOL)

Christine Njeri Rionge OGW (12 January 1966 – 2 October 2023) was a Kenyan technology entrepreneur who was a co-founder of the Internet Service Provider (ISP) Wananchi Online Limited (WOL), one of Kenya’s first internet providers.

== Biography ==
Rionge was born on 12 January 1966 in Nairobi, Kenya. Her brother was the Communication Cabinet Secretary Joe Mucheru.

Rionge's first business was "selling yoghurt from a friend's car trunk to the International School of Kenya and Loretto Convent Musongari High School over their school breaks. I saw a business opportunity and acted on it, determined to turn it into a reality." She also worked as a hairdresser.

Rionge studied Business Administration and Management at the United States International University Africa. She then began working at the local internet provider Inter-Connect.

Rionge co-founded the Internet Service Provider (ISP) Wananchi Online Limited (WOL) in the late 1990s. Wananchi is a Swahili word which means citizen. Rionge was CEO for the first seven years, the enterprise became a multi-million dollar firm and had operations in Kenya, Uganda, Tanzania, Burundi, Rwanda, Somalia, South Sudan, Ethiopia, Zambia, Malawi and Mauritius.

In 2008 Rionge was headhunted to lead the restructuring of Telkom Kenya. Rionge also established the business Ignite Consulting. She was Co-Chair for Elevate Tech 2018 Toronto.

In 2012, Rionge was awarded the Order of the Grand Warrior of Kenya (OGW) for her contribution in entrepreneurship and women's empowerment.

Rionge became a born-again Christian and died on 2 October 2023.
