= Lizzie Wanyoike =

Kenyan businesswoman (1951–2024)

Lizzie Mūthoni Wanyoike
- Born: Elizabeth Mūthoni Wanyoike; 1951; Mūrang'a County, Colony and Protectorate of Kenya
- Died: 14 January 2024 (aged 72)
- Citizenship: Kenya
- Education: Gathukiini Primary School (Primary Leaving Certificate); Kahuhia Girls High School (High School Diploma); Kenyatta University College (Diploma in Education)
- Occupations: Educator, Businesswoman, Entrepreneur & Philanthropist
- Years active: 1972–2024
- Title: Founder, Proprietor & Chief Executive Officer of Nairobi Institute of Business Studies

Lizzie Mūthoni Wanyoike (née Elizabeth Mūthoni 1951 – 14 January 2024) was a Kenyan businesswoman, educator, and philanthropist, who was the founder and chief executive officer of the Nairobi Institute of Business Studies (NIBS).

== Background and education ==
Lizzie Wanyoike was born in Murang'a County in 1951. She was the sixth-born in a family of ten siblings. Her father was a village chief while her mother was a peasant housewife. The family was of poor means, according to her own account.

Wanyoike attended Gathuki-ini Primary School, in Wathenge, Mūrang'a County, before transferring to Kahūhia Girls High School, in Karuri, Muranga County, where she graduated with a High School Diploma. She was then admitted to Kenyatta University College (today Kenyatta University), where she graduated with a Diploma in Education.

== Work experience ==
In 1972, she was posted to State House Girls' School in Nairobi, as a secondary school teacher, at a monthly salary of KSh 961. By 1975, She realized that working for someone else was not her calling. With her husband and other business partners, they established Temple College of Secretarial Studies, based in Nairobi.

Wanyoike, who served as Principal and instructor at Temple, approached management with ideas about expanding the course menu, as well as increasing student intake, management rejected her proposals. In 1999, armed with savings of KSh6 million (US$60,000) and a bank loan from Equity Bank Kenya Limited, worth KSh4 million (US$40,000), she quit Temple and established NIBS.

== Founding of NAIROBI Institute of Business Studies ==
With the KSh10 million she had raised Wanyoike established NIBS in rented premises, starting with 25 students and two teachers, in 2000.

After a rough start, by 2010, she had raised KSh134 million (US$1.34 million), which was used to construct the institute's headquarters at Rūirū-Kìmbo, Kiambu County, on a 10 acres (4 ha), piece of property. By 2018, NIBS had a student population of over 6,000 and an instructor body numbering over 250, on four campuses at Ongata Rongai, Thika Town, Nairobi Central Business District and Rūirū-Kìmbo, along Thika Highway.

== NIBS Hotel Kileleshwa ==
As of January 2018, Wanyoike, through NIBS, was in the process of developing a five-star hotel in the upscale neighbourhood of Kileleshwa, approximately 6.5 kilometres (4 mi), by road, north-west of the central business district of Nairobi. The development will offer commercial services and also serve NIBS' hospitality students during practical training and internships. The hotel, budgeted to cost KSh400 million (US$4 million), is partly funded with loans from Equity Bank Kenya Limited.

== Other investments ==
Wanyoike had other investments in real estate, and the stock market.

== Lizzie Wanyoike Foundation ==
The foundation performs charity work, including the sponsorship of over 20 disadvantaged students at NIBS and more students in Kenyan high schools.

== Death ==
Lizzie Wanyoike died after a battle with cancer on 14 January 2024, at the age of 72.

== See also ==
- Margaret Ireri
- Jane Catherine Ngila
- Jennifer Riria
