= Teodosia Osir =

Kenyan lawyer and corporate executive of Kenya Airways

- Born: Kenya
- Citizenship: Kenya
- Education: University of Nairobi (Bachelor of Laws); Kenya School of Law ( Postgraduate Diploma in Law); University of the West Indies (Higher Diploma in Legislative Drafting); National University of Singapore (Diploma in Employee Relations)
- Occupations: Lawyer, corporate executive
- Years active: 2006 – present
- Title: General counsel and head of corporate affairs at Kenya Airways
- Term: 3 November 2017 - present
- Family: Ellie Osir (spouse); Jeremy Ominde Osir (son)

Teodosia Osir, also Teddie Osir, is a Kenyan lawyer and corporate executive, who is the general counsel and head of corporate affairs at Kenya Airways, an international airline based in Nairobi, the capital and largest city in Kenya.

== Background and education ==
Osir is a graduate of the University of Nairobi School of Law, where she obtained her Bachelor of Laws degree. She also holds a Postgraduate Diploma in Law, awarded by the Kenya School of Law. From 1986 until 1987, she studied at the University of the West Indies at its campus in Cave Hill, Saint Michael, Barbados, where she graduated with a Higher Diploma in Legislative Drafting. In 2007, she obtained a Diploma in Employee Relations, from the National University of Singapore.

== Career ==
Osir is a professional lawyer and a member of the Kenya Bar. She has worked in various capacities, both inside and outside of Kenya.From October 2006 to October 2007, she served as an associate director at David Lawrence and Associates, a Singapore-based corporate recruitment firm specializing in C-Suite executive placements..

From November 2007 until March 2011, she worked as a contract specialist for Qatar Airways. She was then hired by Kenya Airways as the head of legal services from April 2011 until November 2017. In this position, she handled all of the company's commercial transactions, including equipment purchases and leases and related matters.

In November 2017, the company (IATA: KQ, ICAO: KQA), created a new department named Department of Corporate Affairs, charged with handling public relations, investor relations, legal matters, strategy and special projects. Osir's was promoted to general counsel to head the new department.

== Family ==
She is married to Ellie Osir. Their son, Jeremy Ominde Osir, majored in economics at the University of North Carolina in the United States.

== See also ==
- Rebecca Miano
- MaryJane Mwangi
- Sauda Rajab
