= Radio Georgia =

Radio Georgia was the international broadcasting service of Georgian Radio, now known as Georgian Public Broadcaster, the public broadcaster in Georgia. It was closed in 2005.

Radio Georgia broadcast on the shortwave radio bands in English, German and Russian.
