= Sauda Rajab =

Kenyan female corporate executive (1964–2021)

- Born: 1964 (age 61–62); Mombasa, Kenya
- Died: May 2021; India
- Education: University of Nairobi; London Business School; University of Pretoria
- Occupation: Chief Executive Officer
- Years active: 1989 — present
- Known for: Management

Sauda Rajab (1964-2021) was a Kenyan corporate executive, who was the chief executive officer of Precision Air, a privately owned regional airline, based in Tanzania, operating in the countries of the African Great Lakes.

== Background and education ==
She was born in Kenya's port-city of Mombasa, circa 1964. When the children were still young, their parents divorced, which led to their single father raising them. She graduated from the University of Nairobi and received post graduate training and education from he London Business School and the University of Pretoria.

== Career ==
In 1989, Sauda Rajab was hired as a management trainee at the government-owned (30 percent as of September 2015), Kenya Airways (IATA: KQ, ICAO: KQA). During the pre-hiring interview, she informed the panel of her desire to lead an airline some day, correctly predicting the future.

Over the next 24 years, she rose through the ranks. She held several high-profile positions at KQ along the way, including as (a) General Manager for Kenya, (b) Regional General Manager for Europe, the Americas and Asia and her last position at KQ was as (c) General Manager for Cargo.

On 1 March 2013, she was appointed as the managing director and Chief Executive Officer of Precision Air (IATA: PW, ICAO: PRF), where KQ owns 41.23 percent shareholding, as of 31 March 2016. Since her arrival at PW, she has instituted changes and is credited with partial recovery at the airline.

== Other considerations ==
As managing director and CEO, she sits on the board of directors of PW, effective March 2013. As of March 2017, Sauda Rajab was one of a minimal number of women chief executives of private and public airlines in the world.

== See also ==
- Rebecca Miano
- MaryJane Mwangi
