= Jackie Chirchir =

- Born: Kenya
- Education: Daystar University (Bachelor's Degree in Communication) (MBA in Strategic Management)
- Occupations: Marketing Executive, Designer
- Title: Principal Marketing and Communications Officer at USIU Africa and Founder/Owner of Jackie Jewels Limited.

Jackie Chirchir, is a marketing & communications expert and designer who serves as the Principal Marketing and Communications Officer at United States International University Africa (USIU Africa). She is also an internationally recognized designer of jewelry and furniture.

== Background and education ==
Chirchir was born in Kenya circa 1990. After attending local primary and secondary schools, she was admitted to Daystar University, a private Christian university in Kenya, where she graduated with a bachelor's degree in communications. She went on to obtain a Master of Business Administration degree in Strategic Management, also from Daystar.

== Career ==
In 2010, while an undergraduate at university, Jackie began making jewelry from recycled materials, as a hobby. The popularity of her products led to more contacts and the expansion of her clientele. Later she expanded into furniture design and manufacturing, working out of a workshop along Ngong Road, in Nairobi, Kenya's capital city. Her products are marketed under the brand "Jackie Jewels" and employed three people, as of August 2017. Marketing is primarily via social media and by word of mouth.

In addition to working at Jackie Jewels, Ms Chirchir is employed as the Principal Marketing and Communications Officer at USIU Africa in Nairobi.

== See also ==
- List of universities in Kenya
