= Georgian Public Broadcaster =

Georgian domestic public service broadcaster

Georgian Public Broadcaster (GPB)
- Type: LEPL (Note: Legal Entities under Public Law)
- Branding: GPB (English) სსმ (Georgian)
- Founded: December 23, 2004; 21 years ago (as GPB); May 23, 1925; 101 years ago (as Georgian Radio); July 5, 1954; 72 years ago (as Georgian Television)
- Owner: Government of Georgia
- Key people: Tinatin Berdzenishvili (CEO)
- Official website: gpb.ge

The Georgian Public Broadcaster (Georgian: საქართველოს საზოგადოებრივი მაუწყებელი, Sakartvelos Sazogadoebrivi Mauc̣q̇ebeli) is the national public broadcaster of Georgia.

== History ==
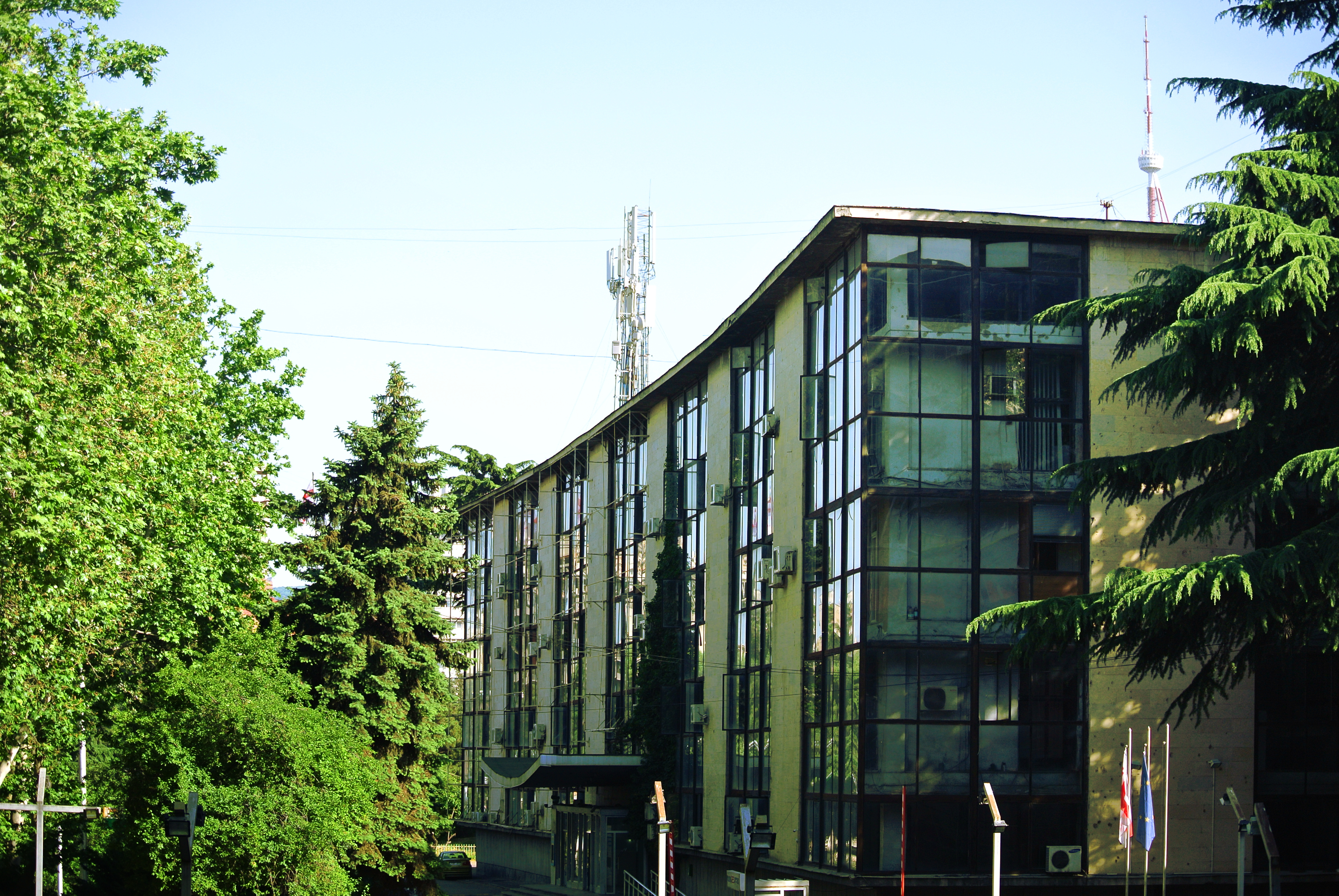
Headquarters of the Georgian Broadcasting in Tbilisi (2015)

It started broadcasting radio in 1925, and Georgian television (TV) started broadcasting in 1954. Today, 85% of the Georgian population receive the First Channel, and 55% receive the Second Channel. Georgian TV programmes are also received by satellite and over the Internet in a number of European and Asian countries.

The adoption of Law on Broadcasting in 2004, started the process of transformation of Georgian TV from being a state broadcaster into a public broadcaster. It is required by law to “provide accurate and up-to-date information that is free from political and commercial bias” and “to address the needs and interests of the larger Georgian society through diversity of programs and viewpoints”. In 2005, the Georgian Parliament elected a Board of Governors, composed of nine members. One of them, Tamar Kintsurashvili, from Liberty Institute, was later elected as the first Director General of GPB. Tinatin Berdzenishvili is the current occupant of this position.

== Programming ==
=== Television ===
GPB's First Channel (Georgian: პირველი არხი, Ṗirveli Arxi), also known as simply 1TV, broadcasts both its own original programming and also foreign series and movies. As of August 2009, the First Channel programming schedule includes such shows as the following:

- The Narrator (მოამბე, Moambe) — a news program shown several times each day.
- Politics Week (პოლიტიკური კვირა, Ṗoliṭiḳuri Ḳvira) — a talk show interviewing public figures.
- First Theme (პირველი თემა, Ṗirveli Tema) — a news analysis show.
- I Love Georgia (მე მიყვარს საქართველო, Me Miq̇vars Sakartvelo) — a game show dealing with Georgian culture.
- Life Is Beautiful (ცხოვრება მშვენიერია, Cxovreba Mšvenieria) — a talk show.
- Syndicated foreign shows such as The O.C., Las Vegas, and Veronica Mars.

GPB's First Channel — Teleschool (პირველი არხი — ტელესკოლა, Ṗirveli Arxi — Ṭelesḳola), originally known as Second Channel or 2TV and later First Channel Education, was broadcast from 1991 and continued in its educational format from March 2020 until it was shut down at the end of 2023.

GPB's First Channel Sport, broadcasts since 21 May 2024.

Previously, GPB operated the Russian-speaking channel First Caucasus Channel (Russian: Первый Кавказский канал, Pervyj Kavkazskij kanal, or just Первый Кавказский, Pervyj Kavkazskij), which was broadcast between 2010 and 2012.

=== Radio ===
- Georgian Radio, also known as Radio 1 or Radio Erti – general-interest station broadcasting information and entertainment content. It also offers various programs for ethnic minorities in the country since 1925
- Georgian Radio Music, also known as Radio 2 or Radio Ori – thematic station with musical content and educational programs for older age groups with a focus on Georgian music since 1995

Georgian Public Broadcasting previously operated the now-closed international shortwave radio station Radio Georgia.

== Controversies ==
A controversy arose in early 2009 over a GPB television program, Sakartvelos Didi Ateuli (საქართველოს დიდი ათეული; "Best Georgians" or "Georgia's Top Ten") — a show which invited viewers to pick Georgia's top historical personages. Officials of the Georgian Orthodox Church publicly objected to the inclusion of both religious and secular figures in the competition, as well as to the idea of having viewers rank the popularity of saints. After extensive public debate and private deliberation, GPB announced that Didi Ateuli would proceed, with both saints and secular figures retained in the competition, but that the final list of ten would not be ranked but would be announced in alphabetical order. A later statement released by the Georgian Orthodox Church attempted to downplay the controversy and suggested that it had been an effort to dissuade church officials from speaking out on social issues.

Georgia's entry in the 2009 Eurovision Song Contest – "We Don't Wanna Put In" – was deemed by the European Broadcasting Union to be a political statement against Russian prime minister Vladimir Putin, and the song was disqualified from the competition. After GPB officials rejected a demand to change either the lyrics of the song or the song itself, it withdrew from the contest.
