= Catherine Mturi-Wairi =

Kenyan accountant (born 1968)

- Born: 1968 (age 57–58); Kenya
- Education: United States International University Africa (Bachelor of Science in finance) (Master of Business Administration)
- Occupations: Accountant, business executive
- Years active: 1993 — present
- Known for: Business administration
- Title: Former managing director Kenya Ports Authority

Catherine Mturi-Wairi is a Kenyan accountant and business administrator. She is the former managing director of Kenya Ports Authority (KPA) and the first woman to lead the KPA. She was appointed to that position on 12 July 2016, having served in an acting capacity from February 2016. She resigned on 9 June 2018, after a 25-year career at the agency.

== Background and education ==
Mturi-Wairi was born in Kenya in 1968. She studied at the United States International University Africa in Nairobi, graduating with a Bachelor of Science in Finance. Later, she obtained a Master of Business Administration from the same university. She is a Certified Public Accountant and a Certified Public Secretary. She is also a SAP Consultant in Finance.

== Career ==
In 1993, she joined KPA as a junior accountant and has worked there continuously since. She previously served as manager for management accounting, manager for financial accounting and manager for finance. On 9 February 2016, at the rank of general manager finance, she was appointed as acting managing director, replacing Gichiri Ndua, who along with other top brass at KPA, was relieved of his duties amid corruption allegations. On 12 July 2016, she was confirmed as managing director of Kenya Ports Authority until June 2018.

== Other responsibilities ==
Mturi-Wairi is a non-executive director of Sidian Bank, a medium-sized Kenyan commercial bank.

== See also ==
- Nancy Onyango
