= Mwenda Ntarangwi =

Kenyan Academic

United States International University of Africa (USIU-Africa) Vice Chancellor
- Preceded by: Lola Omole-Odubekun

Personal details
- Education: Kenyatta University; University of Illinois

Mwenda Ntaragwi is a Kenyan professor of cultural anthropology. He is the Vice Chancellor of the United States International University of Africa (USIU-Africa). Prior to his recent appointment, Ntarangwi served as the CEO of the Commission for University Education (CUE) in Kenya.

== Education ==
Ntarangwi obtained his Bachelor of Education Degree (BEd) in Language at Kenyatta University (KU) before proceeding to earn a Master of Arts (MA) Degree in Kiswahili. He later acquired his Doctor of Philosophy Degree (PhD) in Cultural Anthropology from the University of Illinois at Urbana-Champaign.

== Career ==
Ntarangwi served as Faculty at St. Lawrence University, Augustana College, Calvin College (USA), Kenyatta University and Egerton University (Kenya). He was also the Deputy Principal in charge of Academics, Research and Student Affairs at National Intelligence and Research University College (NIRUC), a constituent College of the National Defence University-Kenya.
