= Oscar Martinez =

Óscar Martínez or Oscar Martinez may refer to:

- Oscar Martínez (actor) (born 1949), Argentine actor
- Oscar Martínez (fencer) (born 1889), Argentine fencer
- Óscar Martínez (musician) (1934–2020), American musician
- Óscar Martínez (presenter) (born 1976), Spanish TV and radio presenter
- Óscar Martínez (tennis) (born 1974), Spanish tennis player
- Oscar Martinez (The Office), a character in the American sitcom The Office
