= First Channel — Teleschool =

First Channel - Teleschool
- Country: Georgia
- Broadcast area: Europe, Asia and Americas

Ownership
- Owner: Georgian Public Broadcaster
- Key people: Tina Berdzenishvili (CEO)
- Sister channels: First Channel

History
- Launched: 1991; 35 years ago
- Closed: December 2023; 2 years ago
- Replaced by: First Channel Sport (2024)
- Former names: Second Channel (1991–2020); First Channel — Education (2020–2022)

Links
- Website: www.2tv.ge

Second Channel (Georgian: მეორე არხი meore arkhi), formerly First Channel - Teleschool (პირველი არხი - ტელესკოლა p’irveli arkhi — t’elesk’ola), is a Georgian television channel owned and operated by the Georgian Public Broadcaster.

== History ==
The Second Channel traces its origins back to 1971, when it was established during the Soviet era as an extension of state television broadcasting in the Georgian Soviet Socialist Republic, supplementing the original First Channel which began operations in 1956.

Following the dissolution of the Soviet Union and the restoration of Georgia's independence, the frequency continued its tenure under state and later public broadcasting frameworks. For decades, it served as a platform for alternative programming, in-depth public debates, minority-language broadcasts, and extensive coverage of live parliamentary sessions.

On 26 March 2020, as an effect of the COVID-19 pandemic, GPB announced that the channel was to be converted to an all-educational format, under the new name First Channel - Education from 30 March.

On 17 December 2023, GPB announced its shutdown, in accordance with the broadcaster's restructuring plan and move to new headquarters in 2024. Following the shutdown, the channel was officially relaunched and transitioned into First Channel Sport (Georgian: პირველი არხი — სპორტი) in 2024. On some television providers, it is still known as "Second Channel" or "First Channel Teleschool".
