= Kellen Kariuki =

Kenyan businesswoman

- Born: Kenya
- Education: United States International University (Bachelor of Science in Accounting) (Master of Business Administration); Cranfield University (Master of Science in International Human Resource Management); Certified Public Accountants of Kenya (Certified Public Accountant)
- Occupations: Businesswoman and corporate executive
- Years active: 2008 – present
- Title: Executive Director & CEO of Unclaimed Financial Assets Authority

Kellen Eileen Kariuki is an accountant, businesswoman and corporate executive in Kenya. Since January 2015, she is the executive director and CEO of the Unclaimed Financial Assets Authority (UFAA), an agency of the central government of Kenya. The government agency, created by Act of parliament in 2011, collects unclaimed funds in the financial system, including un-cashed checks, unclaimed insurance proceeds, cash in dormant bank accounts and money in similar situations in financial institutions. The UFAA then attempts to re-unite the funds with their rightful owners or heirs, upon proper identification. In the meantime, the UFAA invests the money on behalf of the owners, to keep up with inflation.

== Background and education ==
Kellen was born in Kenya and attended local schools for her pre-university education. Her Bachelor of Science (BSc) degree in Accounting was obtained from the United States International University (USIU), in Nairobi. She went on to obtain a Master of Business Administration (MBA) in Strategic Management, also from USIU. Later she obtained the Master of Arts degree in International Human Resource Management, from Cranfield University in the United Kingdom. She is also a Certified Public Accountant (CPA).

== Career ==
For a period of about 20 years, dating back to before 1995, Kellen Kariuki was employed by Citibank, at its Nairobi office. She served in senior management roles including as chief financial officer and as chief human resource officer.

Over the years, she has held or she still holds several board appointments, as (1) Chairperson of Citibank Tanzania Limited (2) Director Citibank Uganda Limited (3) Chair of the Citibank Kenya Provident Fund (4) Director of Cititrust Kenya Limited (5) Director Kenya Roads Board (KRB) (6) Director Resolution Insurance Limited (7) Director AMREF International (8) Director AMREF Flying Doctors and (9) Board Chairperson Standard Chartered Bank, Kenya. She is also a member of faculty at Strathmore Business School. In the past, she served as member of the governing council of the Institute of Certified Public Accountants of Kenya.

As of January 2016, the agency that she headed had approximately KES:6 billion (about US$60 million) under management.

== See also ==
- Stella Kilonzo
- Catherine Mturi-Wairi
- Nancy Onyango
- Esther Nyaiyaki
