= Sedat Ergin =

Turkish journalist

- Born: 1957 (age 68–69); Istanbul, Turkey
- Education: Robert College; Ankara University (BA)
- Occupations: Journalist; writer
- Writing career
- Years active: 1975 – present
- Notable awards: Sedat Simavi Journalism Prize (1997, 2003); Turkish Journalists' Association (2010); Deutsche Welle (2016)

Sedat Ergin (born 1957) is a Turkish journalist.

== Education ==
Ergin completed his secondary education at Robert College in Istanbul before earning a B.A. in International Relations from the Faculty of Political Sciences at Ankara University.

== Career ==
Ergin has been active in journalism since 1975 when he began to work for the Turkish News Agency as a general assignment reporter. He was diplomatic reporter at the daily Cumhuriyet's Ankara office from 1979 to 1987.

In 1987, he joined Hürriyet and was assigned to Washington D.C., where he was stationed for almost six years. He was appointed Ankara Bureau Chief for Hürriyet in 1993. He was in this role for twelve years.

In March 2005, he was appointed editor-in-chief of Milliyet. He was in this post until October 2009, when he returned to Hürriyet as a senior columnist. In August 2014, he was appointed editor-in-chief of Hürriyet. He left this position in March 2017 and returned to writing his regular column.

Ergin continued his second tenure as a columnist at Hürriyet until 19 March 2025. On 1 May 2025, he announced that he would "chart a new path" for himself and left Hürriyet after 33 years with the newspaper. As of 1 July 2025, he joined the weekly Gazete Oksijen as a columnist.

He was a regular political commentator on NTV and CNN Turk news channels for many years.

== Awards ==
Ergin received the Sedat Simavi Journalism Award twice, in 1997 and 2003, as well as the press freedom awards of the Turkish Journalists' Association in 2010 and the Deutsche Welle in 2016.
