= Tamar Kintsurashvili =

Georgian government commissioner and author

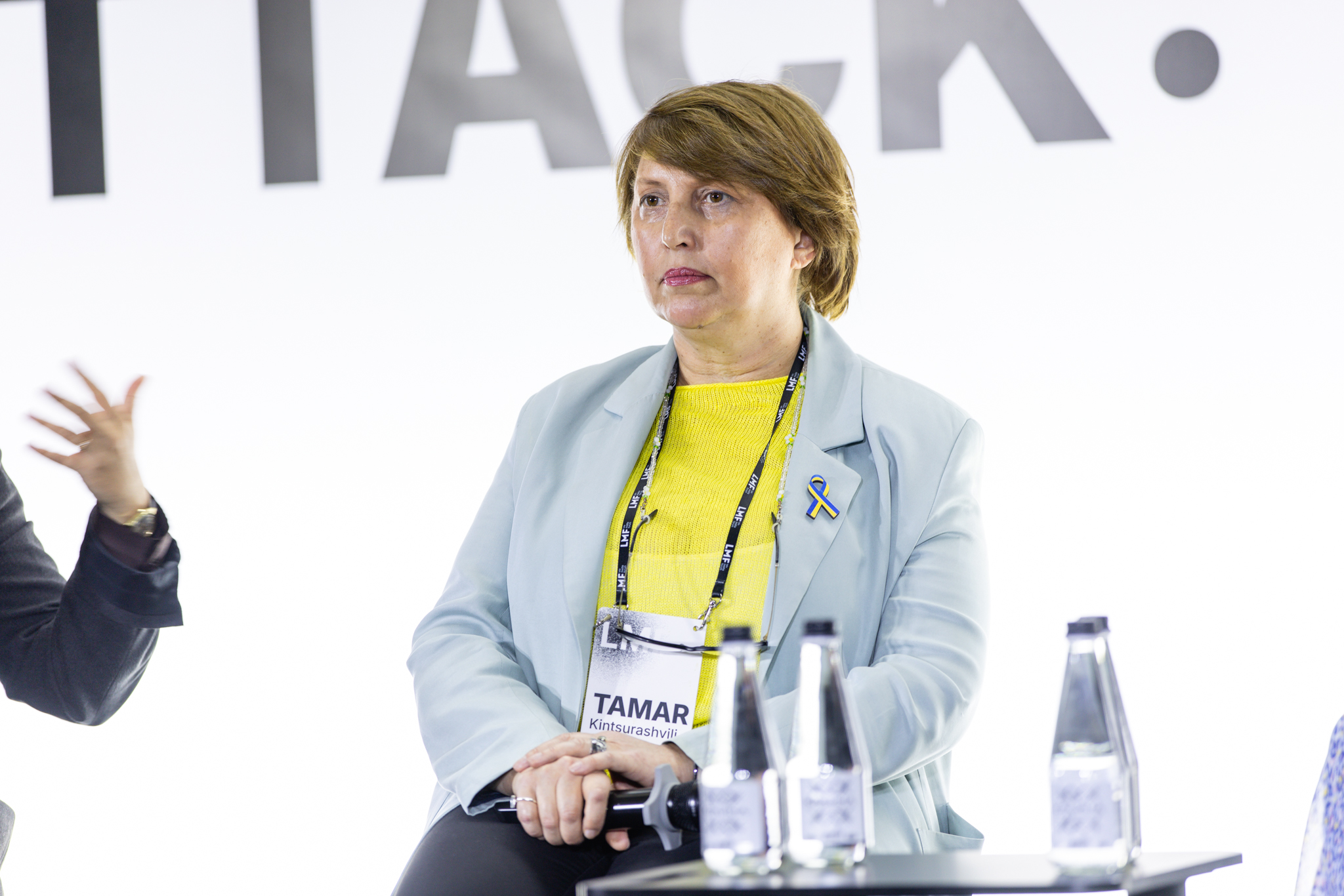
Tamar Kintsurashvili in 2026

Tamar Kintsurashvili (Georgian: თამარ კინწურაშვილი) is a Georgian who was the Director General of Georgian Public Broadcaster and is a member of the government commission monitoring elections.

== Early life and education ==
Kintsurashvili was born on May 8, 1970, in Tskaltubo, Georgia. She graduated from the Faculty of Journalism of Tbilisi Ivane Javakhishvili State University in 1994. She speaks Georgian, Russian and English.

== Career ==
In 1993-95, Kintsurashvili was working as a correspondent of paper Droni, and from 1995-99 was an editor of Political Division of the same paper. In 1999 she became the deputy editor of the paper. From 2001, she was an editor of the magazine Tavisupleba (Liberty), as well as the Communications and Media programs Director of the NGO Liberty Institute. She is an author and co-author of several scientific works.

In March 2005, the Parliament of Georgia elected her to Board of Governors of Georgian Public Broadcaster, where she was a deputy chair of the Board till her election as Director General. She was replaced by Levan Kubaneishvili in 2008.

In 2012, she was a member of the Georgian government commission monitoring the election process, as well as Georgia's Security Council.

== Works ==
- "Freedom of Expression in USA and in Europe" (2005), Volume I-an editor
- "Freedom of Expression in Georgia" (2005), V.II - co-author. Zurab Adeishvili
- "Media and Law" (2004), an editor
- "The Media Self-regulation Guide" (2004), compiler and author
- "Ethic and Self-regulation" (2003)the compiler and editor
- "Professional Standard of the Media", co-author (2002)
