= First Channel (Georgian TV channel) =

Public TV channel in Georgia

- Country: Georgia
- Broadcast area: Georgia, reaching bordering regions via overspill of the Georgian terrestrial network
- Headquarters: Tbilisi

Programming
- Language: Georgian
- Picture format: 16:9/4:3 (576i, SDTV); 1080i HDTV

Ownership
- Owner: Georgian Public Broadcaster
- Key people: Tinatin Berdzenishvili (CEO)
- Sister channels: Second Channel

History
- Launched: 30 December 1956; 69 years ago

Links
- Website: www.1tv.ge

First Channel (Georgian: პირველი არხი, romanized: p'irveli arkhi), also called 1TV, is a Georgian television channel owned and operated by Georgian Public Broadcaster, launched in 1956. This channel is received by 85% of the population of Georgia.

== History ==
=== Soviet era ===
Broadcasts began on 30 December 1956 with three days in a week. By 1960, was broadcasting six days in a week.

From 1970 to 1981, the development of the First Channel of Georgian Television was associated with the work of Grigory Ratner. In 1972, an antenna and special equipment for television and radio broadcasting were installed on Mount Mtatsminda, which allowed 600 thousand families of the Georgian SSR to receive republican television programs. The coverage of the First Channel of Georgian Television reached 94% by 1981 (for comparison, the coverage of Program I was 80%, Program II - 40%, and Georgian Program II - 30%).

=== Since independence ===
In April 1991, Georgia's independence was proclaimed, but Abkhazia and South Ossetia simultaneously announced their secession from Georgia. Eduard Shevardnadze, who was supposed to lead independent Georgia to prosperity and further development, was unable to cope with the economic crisis, the conflicts in Abkhazia and South Ossetia, and rampant banditry. One of the consequences of his unsuccessful policy was systemic power outages and, as a result, meager funding for Georgian television and deterioration of equipment. The main information program in Georgia at that time was the program "Moambe" ("Bulletin"), broadcast in both Georgian and Russian - the Russian version was hosted by Mark Ryvkin, who worked on Georgian television for more than 40 years.

For his strictly pro-government point of view, the Abkhaz authorities subjected him to severe criticism, since he preferred to cover events in Abkhazia in a scenario that was beneficial to the Georgian central authorities. However, he was also criticized in the Georgian parliament: MP Sarishvili raised the question of the responsibility of journalists of the First Channel of Georgian Television for reports and the competence of Ryvkin, who consistently spoke in support of Zviad Gamsakhurdia and Eduard Shevardnadze. In 2003, the program was cancelled, and Ryvkin was fired after the Rose Revolution: on November 22, 2003, Georgian television live covered the process of dismissal of Eduard Shevardnadze, however, according to witnesses, the quality of the recording and television picture was frankly low, as a result of which the foreign audience in principle I could not make out what was happening on the screen.

The channel's logo in the early 2000s was a series of lines creating a design similar to a thumbs signal.

In 2004, when Mikheil Saakashvili became president, the "Broadcasting Law" was adopted, according to which Georgian Public Broadcasting became an institution independent from the government, governed by a board of trustees. Moreover, they are appointed jointly by the President and the Parliament of Georgia, and funding is calculated from a certain percentage of Georgia's GDP. In many ways, the Broadcasting Law helped shape the modern image of the First Channel of Georgian Television, making it open in its editorial policy - in addition, it was under Mikheil Saakashvili that the share of Russian-language television broadcasting in Georgia increased. However, fierce competition between the Georgian-language First Georgian and the Russian-language First Caucasian Information against the backdrop of the conflict in South Ossetia led to a reduction in Russian-language broadcasting in 2010. Currently, Russian-language broadcasting, as well as broadcasting in other languages, is managed by the Second Channel of Georgian Television and the TV 3 channel.

The official website of the First Channel of Georgian Television is available in seven languages: Georgian, Abkhaz, Armenian, Azerbaijani, Ossetian, English and Russian.

== Programmes ==
The content of the channel is based on news, talk programmes, sports, documentaries, series, the Eurovision Song Contest and foreign movies.

- Moambe (მოამბე) (Note: Formed 4 January 1968)
- P'olit'ik'uri k'vira / Political Week (პოლიტიკური კვირა)
- P'irveli tema / First Topic (პირველი თემა)
- Me miq'vars sakartvelo / I love Georgia (მე მიყვარს საქართველო)
- Tskhovreba mshvenieria / Life is Wonderful (ცხოვრება მშვენიერია)
