= Nancy Onyango =

Kenyan businessperson (born 1964)

- Born: 1964 (age 61–62); Kenya
- Education: University of Nairobi (BCom in finance & accounting) (Master of Business Administration); United States International University Africa and Columbia University (Doctor of Business Administration); Institute of Certified Public Accountants of Kenya (Certified Public Accountant)
- Occupations: Businesswoman and corporate executive
- Years active: 2010–present
- Title: Director of the Office of Internal Audit and Inspection at the International Monetary Fund

Nancy Asiko Onyango is a Kenyan accountant, businesswoman and corporate executive, who is the director of the Office of Internal Audit and Inspection at the International Monetary Fund. She was appointed on 4 December 2017, with the appointment to take effect on 1 February 2018. Before her appointment, she was the CEO of Reliance Risk Advisory Solutions, a Nairobi-based consultancy firm.

== Background and education ==
Onyango was born in Kenya, attending local schools for her pre-university education. In 1984, she was admitted to the University of Nairobi (UoN), graduating in 1987 with a Bachelor of Commerce (BCom) degree in Accounting and Finance. She continued with her studies at UoN, graduating in 1989 with a Master of Business Administration (MBA) degree. In 2013, she enrolled in the United States International University Africa, graduating in 2016 with a Doctor of Business Administration (DrBA) degree. As part of her doctoral studies, she took courses at Columbia Business School in New York City.

== Career ==
From 1995 to 1998, Onyango worked as a manager at PricewaterhouseCoopers, at their location in Uxbridge, London, United Kingdom. She was promoted to senior manager, and worked there until 2002. In 2005, she was appointed partner at PwC, leading the consulting unit at PwC East Africa, based in Nairobi, Kenya, specializing in technology, governance risk and compliance. She worked in that capacity until June 2012. In July 2012, she was named the head of the then newly created Risk Assurance Services Unit at PwC East Africa, working there until 2014.

In January 2015, she was appointed partner at Ernst & Young, as head of governance, risk & compliance for the African continent, until August 2016. In December 2017, she was appointed to lead the Internal Audit unit at the IMF, effective February 2018.

== Family ==
Onyango is a married mother of three sons.

== Other considerations ==
She holds several board appointments, including as non-executive director of Kenya Commercial Bank Group, non-executive director of Cytonn Investments, and Fairtrade Africa, where she chairs the board's audit and finance committee.
