= Kabete National Polytechnic =

Kenyan national university

The Kabete National Polytechnic is a national institution offering technical training in Kenya. The Kabete technical is located on Waiyaki Way near Uthiru market in Nairobi County. Kabete national polytechnic is known country wide for its best training and performance and considered one of the best technical institution in Kenya This institution was started in 1924 and underwent various revolutionary stages until in 2016 where it was upgraded to a national polytechnic The institute is also accredited by TVET (Technical and Vocational Education and Training).

== History ==
Kabete technical was started in 1924 as a technical school and was later change to a training camp for soldiers during the second world war. The school later changed to a primary school then to a secondary school. In 1972 the school started offering technical education for three year courses in Nairobi.

== See also ==
- University of Nairobi
- PC Kinyanjui Technical Training Institute
