= MaryJane Mwangi =

Kenyan businessperson

- Born: Kenya
- Education: University of Nairobi; Institute of Human Resource Management
- Occupation: Corporate Executive
- Years active: 1990 — present
- Title: Chief Executive Officer of the National Oil Corporation of Kenya
- Spouse: Martin Mbogo

MaryJane Mwangi, also Mary Jane Mwangi, is a corporate executive in Kenya, who served as the managing director and chief executive officer of the National Oil Corporation of Kenya, from August 2017 to October 2019.

== Background and education ==
She graduated from the University of Nairobi with a Master of Business Administration degree in 2006. She also holds a Higher Diploma in Human Resource Management, awarded in 2013, by the Institute of Human Resource Management (IHRM), based in Nairobi, Kenya's capital and largest city.

== Career ==
She started her long career in the consumer oil sector in 1993, working as an Export Manager for Agip Kenya Limited (AGKL), responsible for downstream distribution of fuels and oils from the depot in Mombasa to five countries in the African Great Lakes area, serving in that capacity until 1998. For one year, from 1998 until 1999, she served as the Customer Service Manager at AGKL. The next year, from 1999 until 2000, she served as the LPG Supervisor at AGKL.

In 2000, she switched companies and moved over to Shell/BP, as the LPG Manager, based in the coastal city of Malindi, serving in that capacity until 2001. In 2001 she moved again, relocating to Chevron/Caltex Kenya Limited, as a Sales Business Consultant, serving in that capacity for seven years.

In 2008, Ms Mwangi was appointed the Head of Sales & Marketing division at the National Oil Corporation of Kenya (NOCK), serving in that capacity for the next five years. In July 2013, she was promoted to the position of General Manager, Downstream Operations at NOCK, serving in that capacity until July 2016, when she was appointed Acting Managing Director and Acting CEO.

After performing in an active capacity for one year, Mwangi was confirmed by the board of NOCK, as the substantive CEO and managing director, for a three-year term effective 1 August 2017, replacing Sumayya Hassan-Athmani, who had resigned in July 2016.

== Other considerations ==
In July 2016, in her capacity as Acting CEO, she joined the board of directors of NOCK, and had been a member until her departure in October 2019.

== Family ==
Mangi is married to Martin Mbogo, the manager of Tullow Oil Kenya.

== See also ==
- Rebecca Miano
- Josephine Wapakhabulo
- Energy in Kenya
