= United States International University-Africa =

University in Kenya

Coordinates: 01°13′05″S 36°52′45″E

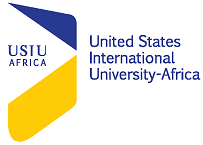
- Motto: Education To Take You Places
- Type: Private
- Established: 1969; 57 years ago
- Vice-Chancellor: Prof. Mwenda Ntarangwi
- Administrative staff: 500+ (2024)
- Students: 6,500+ (2024)
- Location: USIU Road, Kasarani, Nairobi, Kenya
- Campus: Urban
- Website: www.usiu.ac.ke

United States International University-Africa, also known as USIU-Africa, is a private university in Kenya. The university is accredited by the Commission for Higher Education (CUE) in Kenya and by the Western Association of Schools and Colleges (WASC) in the United States.

The university is currently headed by Prof. Mwenda Ntarangwi, assisted by a team of management board members.

== Location ==
The university campus is located in the Roysambu neighborhood, in the Kasarani suburb of Nairobi, Kenya's capital and largest city. This location lies approximately 12 kilometres (7 mi), by road, northeast of Nairobi's central business district. The coordinates of the university campus are: 01°13'05.0"S, 36°52'45.0"E (Latitude:-1.218056; Longitude:36.879167).

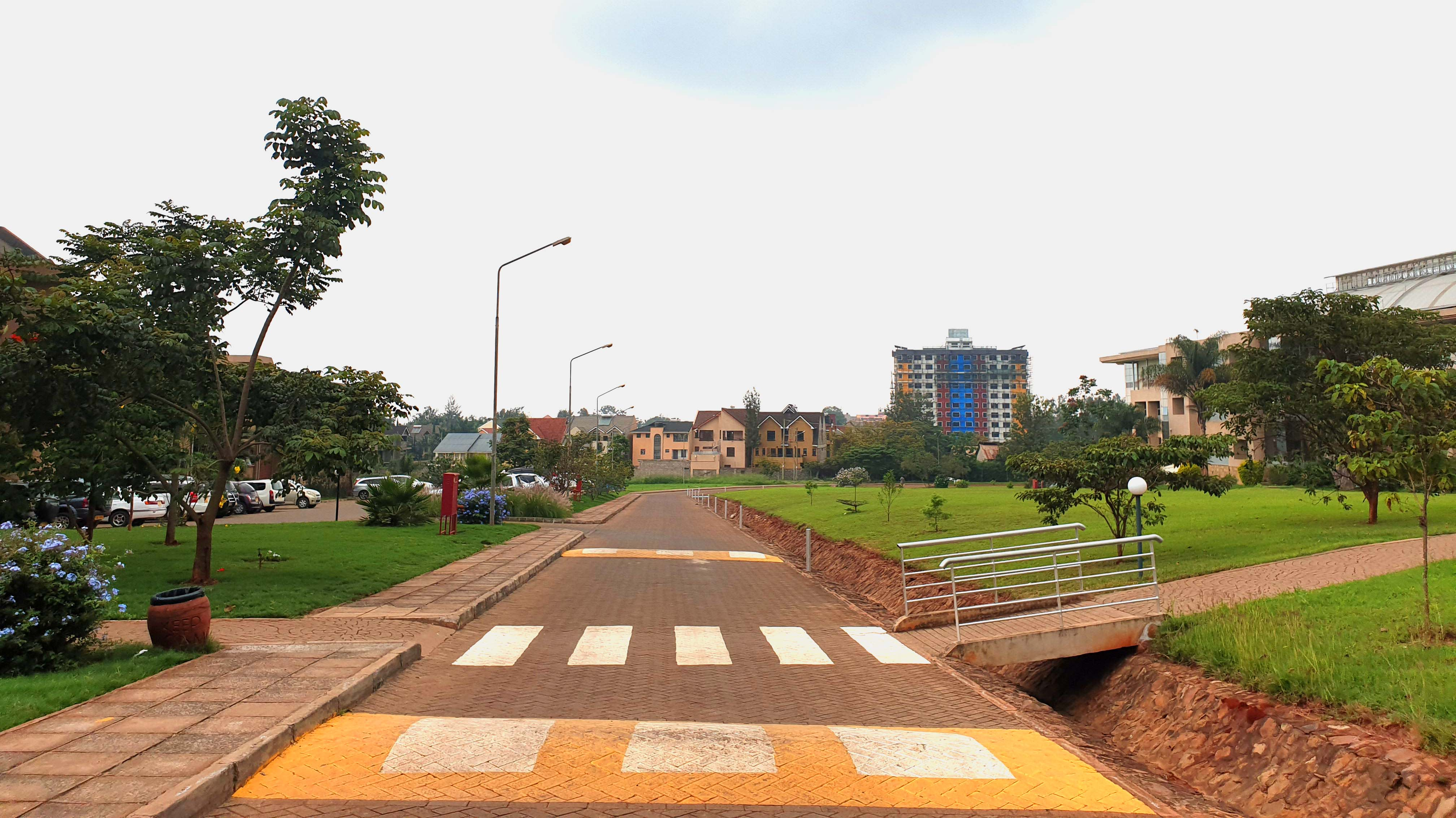

== History ==
The university was established in 1969 as the Nairobi Campus of United States International University (USIU), a San Diego–based institution. In 1999, the United States International University, Nairobi Campus, established itself as a separate university under its new name: USIU-Africa. In 2001, USIU (San Diego) merged with the California School of Professional Psychology (CSPP) to form Alliant International University.

Over 55 nationalities are represented among the student population, undertaking 38 undergraduate, graduate and doctoral programs at USIU-Africa. The university has more than 25,000 alumni.

== Academic schools ==
As of January 2025, USIU-Africa maintains the following schools:

- The Chandaria School of Business (CSOB)
- The School of Science & Technology (SST)
- The School of Humanities & Social Sciences (SHSS)
- The School of Pharmacy & Health Sciences (SPHS)
- The School of Communication, Cinematic & Creative Arts (SCCCA)
- The School of Graduate Studies (SGS)

== Academic programs ==
Undergraduate programs

- BSc. Finance
- BSc. Accounting
- BSc. Tourism Management
- BSc. International Business Administration
- BSc. Hotel and Restaurant Management
- Bachelor of Global Leadership & Governance
- BA. Sociology
- BA. Psychology
- BA. Criminal Justice Studies
- BA. International Relations
- BA. Animation
- BA. Journalism
- BA. Film Production and Directing
- BSc. Software Engineering
- BSc. Data Science and Analytics
- BSc. Applied Computer Technology
- BSc. Information Systems Technology
- Bachelor of Pharmacy
- BSc. Applied Biochemistry
- BSc. Analytical Chemistry
- BSc. Epidemiology & Biostatistics

Graduate and doctoral programs

- MSc. Global Banking and Finance
- Master of Business Administration
- MBA - Global Business Management
- MBA - Health Leadership and Management
- MSc. Management and Organizational Development
- Master of Science in Information Systems Technology
- Master of Science in Information Security
- MA. Communication Studies
- MA. International Relations
- MA. Clinical Psychology
- MA. Counselling Psychology
- MA. Marriage and Family Therapy
- MA. Criminal & Transitional Justice
- Doctor of Psychology (Psy.D), Clinical Psychology
- Doctor of Philosophy in International Relations
- Doctor of Business Administration
- Doctor of Philosophy in Information Systems & Technology

== Notable alumni ==
- Joseph Cherorot, Kenyan MP
- Jackie Chirchir, jewelry designer
- Emmanuel Ikubese
- Catherine Mturi-Wairi: former managing director of Kenya Ports Authority
- Esther Passaris: social entrepreneur, philanthropist and politician
- Njeri Rionge (1966–2023), technology entrepreneur who was a co-founder of the Internet Service Provider (ISP) Wananchi Online Limited (WOL)
- Kris Senanu: businessman
- Vimal Shah: chief executive officer of Bidco Africa, a multinational consumer products manufacturer and distributor

== See also ==
- List of universities in Kenya
- Alliant International University
- Education in Kenya
