= Rebecca Miano =

Kenyan lawyer and corporate executive

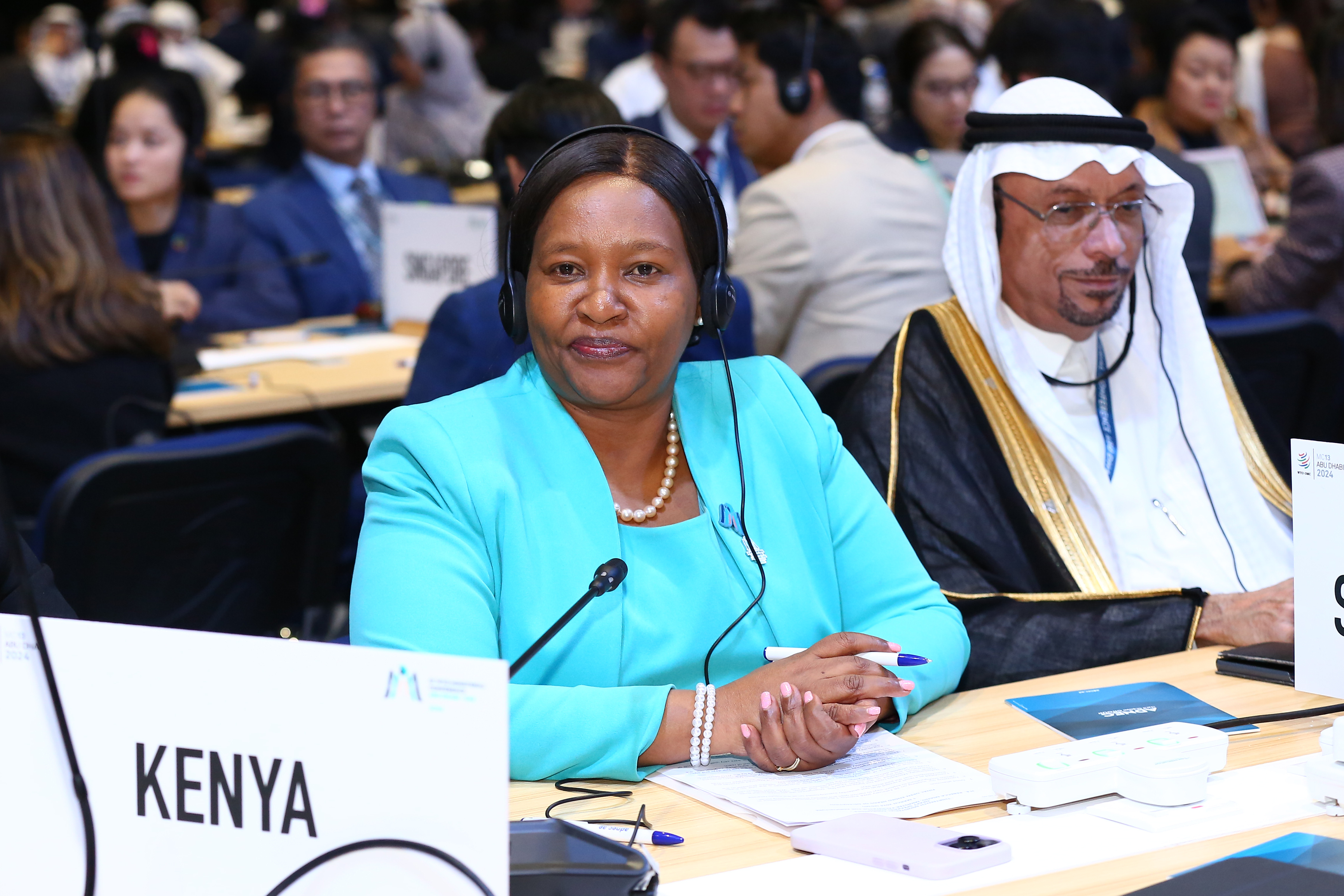
- Miano in 2024
- Born: Kenya
- Education: University of Nairobi; (Bachelor of Laws); Kenya School of Law; (Advocates Training Programme); Australian National University; (Master of Laws)
- Occupations: Lawyer and continental business leader
- Years active: 1998–present
- Predecessor: Alfred Mutua
- Website: https://www.tourism.go.ke

Hon. Rebecca Miano, EGH is a Kenyan lawyer and continental business leader, currently serving as Cabinet Secretary for Tourism and Wildlife. She previously served as the Cabinet Secretary for Investments, Trade & Industry from October 2023 to July 2024. She is a former Cabinet Secretary for East African Community, the ASALs and Regional Development. Before joining the cabinet, she was the managing director and chief executive officer of KenGen Plc., the largest producer of electricity in the East African region from November 2017.During her tenure, KenGen was noted for its focus on suistainable energy development,leading to recognition in renewable energy and structuring international and regional multi-million dollar business deals .She founded the Pink Energy Forum to address issues of female and gender parity within the energy sector. She was confirmed on 1 November 2017, having served in acting capacity since August 2017.

== Background and education ==
Miano holds a Bachelor of Laws from the University of Nairobi and attended the Advocates Training Programme at the Kenya School of Law She also holds a Master of Laws in Comparative Law, awarded by the Australian National University.

== Career ==
=== Career in the private sector ===
With a 25-year multifaceted career in the energy sector, Miano is a recognized continental business leader. She first worked at a Nairobi-based law firm, Musyoka Annan & Company Advocates. Later, she worked at Slater and Gordon, a law firm in Queensland, Australia. In 1998, she joined Kenya Electricity Generating Company (KenGen) as assistant legal officer. Over time, she rose in rank to become assistant company secretary. At the time of her promotion to acting managing director, in August 2017, she was the director of legal affairs and company secretary at KenGen, having served in both roles since 2008.

In November 2017, Miano beat 90 other applicants and was appointed to her position, replacing the retiring Albert Mugo. At the time, she was the first and only female chief executive at KenGen. By 2017, she was one of the only two women in Kenya who led a parastatal company, the other being MaryJane Mwangi, the chief executive officer of National Oil Corporation of Kenya.

=== Timeline ===
- July 2024: Appointed Cabinet Secretary, Ministry for Tourism and Wildlife
- October 2023: Appointed Cabinet Secretary, Ministry for Investments, Trade and Industry
- September 2022: Appointment as Cabinet Secretary, Ministry of East African Community, Arid and Semi-Arid Lands (ASALs), and Regional Development.
- Miano was part of the EAC Council of Ministers and an ex-officio member of the East African Legislative Assembly (EALA).

== Other activities ==
She is the founder of Rebecca Miano Foundation,which focuses on mentoring and empowering women and youth on leadership.

Miano is a member of the Law Society of Kenya, and a registered Certified Public Secretary of Kenya (CPS-K).

In 2023, she was conferred with the prestigious fellowship status by ICPSK.

She is also Patron of the Future Leaders Challenge Initiative supporting stakeholders from the hospitality and tourism sector to connect and align on the human capital Strategy for East Africa as well as empowering and enabling young talents to join the industry.

== Recognition ==
- In 2024, Miano was voted the Best Public Service Leader of the Year at the East Africa 2024 Women of Excellence Awards.
- In 2023, she was decorated with Order of the Golden Heart (EGH), in recognition of her outstanding service to Kenya.
- In 2019, she was awarded with the Moran of the Order of the Burning Spear (MBS) in recognition of her outstanding service to the nation.
- In 2010, Miano was decorated with the Order of the Grand Warrior of Kenya in recognition of her body of work
- In August 2020, her leadership and corporate governance was recognized in the African Business Leadership Awards by African Leadership magazine; she won in the African Inspirational Business Leadership Award Category.
- Miano was appointed by the World Bank Group as a participating member to the Advisory Council on Gender and Development in June 2021 where she was to serve a-two-year-term.
- In 2010, Miano won the Company Secretary of the Year Award in the Champions of Governance Awards series.

Ministry of Investments, Trade & Industry

- Spearheaded the signing and ratification by the National Assembly of the Kenya-EU EPA
- Co-chaired negotiations that led to Kenya/UAE concurrence on a Comprehensive Economic Partnership Agreement (CEPA)
- Formalized the development of a road map for the completion of the Kenya-US Trade and Investment Partnership (STIP) negotiations
- Spearheaded the groundbreaking and construction of flagship export processing zones in Busia, Eldoret, Muranga and Kirinyaga counties
- Presided over the establishment of Kenya as a business process outsourcing (BPO) destination that currently has three BPOs (Majorel, Adec and Samasource) located in EPZs and one CCI Global located at the Tatu City SEZ
- Established the Karibu Business Support Centres (KBSC) initiative, a one-stop-shop business support initiative aimed at fostering trade, manufacturing and investments in Kenya
- Admitted seven green FDI projects into the Africa Green Industrialization Initiative (AGII) pipeline with a cumulative investment of over $1billion
- Formalized agreements with county governments regarding the implementation and operationalization of County Aggregation and Industrial Parks (CAIPs)
- Launched the National E-Commerce Strategy

Ministry of East African Community, the ASAL & Regional Development

- Championed elimination of non-tariff barriers (NTBs) to Kenyan products in the EAC
- Revitalized the EAC cooperation under the Northern Corridor Integrated Projects (NCIP)
- Concluded a month long national consultations on the EAC Political Confederation Constitution to support operationalisation of the fourth pillar of the EAC integration
- Oversaw emergency response efforts during Kenya's worst drought in 40 years by putting in place interventions in the provision of water and food mainly for pastoralist communities across the country.

KenGen Plc

- Grew KenGen's installed capacity from 1,575MW before 2017 to 1,904MW in 2022
- Successful project planning, design, negotiation of funding, groundbreaking, construction, and commissioning of 86MW Olkaria I Additional Unit 6 geothermal power plant and 172MW Olkaria V Geothermal power plant.
- Successfully pioneered/implemented wellhead generation in Kenya and grew installed capacity to 81MW
- Increased geothermal capacity from 713MW to 799MW placing Kenya at position seven among the top ten geothermal producers in the world.
- Secured three multimillion Geothermal drilling contracts in Ethiopia and Djibouti, making KenGen the first public institution to venture into business in the Horn of Africa
- Successfully constructed and handed over Ksh.330 million Naivasha Level IV hospital in partnership with Nakuru County Government as part of the Big Four Agenda to improve the health care of communities in Naivasha and its environs (2022)
- Successfully implemented the largest Resettlement Action Plan (RAP) during the construction of 280MW Olkaria I Unit 4 & 5 and Olkaria IV Geothermal Power Plants. KenGen successfully resettled 155 households on a 1,700 acres piece of land referred to as ‘RAP Land’ with fully equipped social amenities such as Schools, Health clinics, among others
- Founded the Pink Energy Initiative to uplift the status of women within KenGen. The forum has since advanced to a sectoral platform to enjoin the other state agencies within the Ministry of Energy
- Launched Blue Energy and Y-Gen platforms for men and youth respectively to help grow an all-rounded workforce, increasing employee engagement and business growth
- African Participant at the CEO Roundtable with the Secretary-General of the United Nations at the 77th United Nations General Assembly
- Panelist at the UN Global Compact Private Sector Forum on 19 September 2022 in New York, USA
- Represented Kenya at the 2021 United Nations Climate Change Conference (COP26) as a business leader championing climate change mitigation through the deployment of renewable energy for Kenya and other African leaders
- Put KenGen at the forefront in mitigating climate change, in line with Kenya's commitment to tackle Climate Change, by reducing Green House Gas (GHG) emissions by about 32% by 2030
- Led KenGen in implementing six Clean Development Mechanism (CDM) projects with three of them based in Olkaria (Olkaria IV Geothermal Project, Olkaria I Additional Units 4 and 5 Geothermal Project, and Olkaria II Unit 3 Geothermal Expansion Project). All these together, contribute to offsetting approximately 1.5 million tonnes of Carbon Dioxide (tCO2) equivalent annually
- Led KenGen in getting clearance to sell four million tonnes of carbon credits
- Member of the UN Global Compact Board and Vice Chair for Global Compact Kenya
- Appointed and serves as a member of the COP26 Presidency business leaders' forum to accelerate climate action commitments
- Founded and convened the first ever Africa Sustainable Energy Conference in Olkaria, Naivasha in partnership with the Ministry of Energy providing a platform for South-to-South partnership toward energy security in Africa
- Successfully implemented several large energy projects on the continent, earning KenGen an honorary recognition in the 2021 East Africa Regional Climate Action awards by IGAD for its efforts in successful accelerating the transition to low carbon economies in Eastern Africa
- Named top 100 Women CEOs in Africa by Reset Global People in partnership with Pulse and Avance Media, twice in a row
- Named top 25 movers and shakers in Africa in 2021 by the African Energy Chamber
- Listed among the 50 most senior women in Corporate Africa by The Africa.com Definitive List of Women CEOs, 2021
- Took part in the CEO Roundtable high-level meeting with the Secretary-General of the United Nations at the 77th United Nations General Assembly

== See also ==
- Cabinet of Kenya
