= Companies traded on the Nairobi Securities Exchange =

This is a list of companies listed and traded on the Nairobi Securities Exchange. The original compilation of the list was done on 31 December 2015.

== Agricultural ==
Symbol	Listing	Notes
EGAD	Eaagads Limited	Coffee growing and sales
KUKZ	Kakuzi Limited	Coffee, tea, passionfruit, avocados, citrus, pineapple, others
KAPC	Kapchorua Tea Company Limited	tea growing, processing and marketing
LIMT	Limuru Tea Company Limited	tea growing
SASN	Sasini Tea and Coffee	Tea, coffee
WTK	Williamson Tea Kenya Limited	tea growing, processing and distribution

== Automobiles and Accessories ==
Symbol	Listing	Notes
CGEN	Car & General Kenya	Automobiles, engineering, agriculture

== Banking ==
Symbol	Listing	Notes
ABSA	ABSA Bank Kenya	Banking, finance
CFC	CfC Stanbic Holdings	Banking, finance
DTK	Diamond Trust Bank Group	Banking, finance
EQTY	Equity Group Holdings Limited	Banking, finance; crosslisted on the Uganda Securities Exchange
HFCK	Housing Finance Company of Kenya	Mortgage financing
IHM	I&M Holdings Limited	Banking, Financial services
KCB	Kenya Commercial Bank Group	Banking & finance. Crosslisted on the Uganda Securities Exchange, the Dar es Salaam Stock Exchange and the Rwanda Stock Exchange
NBK	National Bank of Kenya	Banking, finance	SCBK	Standard Chartered of Kenya	Banking, finance
COOP	Cooperative Bank of Kenya	Banking, finance
BOK	Bank of Kigali	Banking, finance

== Commercial and Services ==
Symbol	Listing	Notes
XPRS	Express Kenya Limited	Logistics
HBER	Hutchings Biemer Limited	Furniture
KQ	Kenya Airways	Kenya's flagship airline; crosslisted on Uganda Securities Exchange and Dar es Salaam Stock Exchange
LKL	Longhorn Kenya Limited	Publishing
NMG	Nation Media Group	Newspapers, magazines, radio stations, television stations. Crosslisted on the Uganda Securities Exchange, the Dar es Salaam Stock Exchange and the Rwanda Stock Exchange
SCAN	Scangroup	advertising and marketing
SGL	Standard Group Limited	Newspapers, magazine, Radio station, TV station
TPSE	TPS Serena	Hotels & resorts
SMER	Sameer Africa Limited	Tires
UCHM	Uchumi Supermarkets	Supermarkets; Crosslisted on the Uganda Securities Exchange, the Dar es Salaam Stock Exchange and the Rwanda Stock Exchange

== Construction and Allied ==
Symbol	Listing	Notes
ARM	ARM Cement Limited	Cement, fertilizers, minerals; mining and manufacturing
BAMB	Bamburi Cement Limited	Cement
CRWN	Crown Paints (Kenya)	Paint manufacturing
CABL	East African Cables Limited	Cable manufacture
PORT	East Africa Portland Cement Company	cement manufacture and marketing

== Energy and Petroleum ==
Symbol	Listing	Notes
KEGN	Kengen	electricity generation	KPLC	Kenya Power and Lighting Company	electricity transmission, distribution and retail sale
TOTL	Total Kenya Limited	petroleum importation and distribution
UMME	Umeme	Electric power distribution. Primary listing on the Uganda Securities Exchange

== Insurance ==
Symbol	Listing	Notes
BRIT	British-American Investments Company	Insurance
CIC	CIC Insurance Group	Insurance
CFCI	Liberty Kenya Holdings Limited (formally CFC Insurance)	Insurance
JUB	Jubilee Holdings Limited	Insurance, investments. Crosslisted on the Uganda Securities Exchange and the Dar es Salaam Stock Exchange
KNRE	Kenya Reinsurance Corporation	Reinsurance
SLAM	Sanlam Kenya Plc (formally Pan Africa Insurance Holdings)	Insurance

== Investment ==
Symbol	Listing	Notes
CTUM	Centum Investment Company	Investments
OCH	Olympia Capital Holdings	construction and building materials
TCL	TransCentury Investments	Investments

== Investment Services ==
Symbol	Listing	Notes
NSE	Nairobi Securities Exchange	Stock exchange

== Manufacturing and Allied ==
Symbol	Listing	Notes
BAUM	A Baumann and Company	Machinery distribution and marketing, investments
BOC	BOC Kenya Limited	Industrial gases, welding products
BAT	British American Tobacco Limited	tobacco products
CARB	Carbacid Investments Limited	Carbon dioxide manufacturing
EABL	East African Breweries	Beer, spirits; crosslisted at Uganda Securities Exchange and Dar es Salaam Stock Exchange
EVRD	Eveready East Africa	batteries
ORCH	Kenya Orchards Limited	fruit growing, preservation and distribution, fruit-juice manufacture and marketing
MSC	Mumias Sugar Company Limited	sugar cane growing, sugar manufacture & marketing
UNGA	Unga Group	flour milling

== Telecommunication and Technology ==
Symbol	Listing	Notes
SCOM	Safaricom	Mobile telephony Internet service provider

== Growth Enterprise Market Segment ==
Symbol	Listing	Notes
ADSS	Atlas Development & Support Services	Support services in Oil and Gas. Primary listing on the London Stock Exchange.
HAFR	Home Afrika	Real estate
FTGH	Flame Tree Group Holdings Ltd	Consumer Goods
KVL	Kurwitu Ventures	Sharia investments

== Real Estate Investment Trust ==
Symbol	Listing	Notes
	Stanlib Fahari I-REIT	REITs

== Fixed income security market segment ==
(FISMS)

Symbol	Listing	Notes
KPLC-P4	Kenya Power & Lighting Ltd 4% Pref 20.00	--
KPLC-P7	Kenya Power & Lighting Ltd 7% Pref 20.00	--
