= List of stock exchanges in the Commonwealth of Nations =

This is a list of active stock exchanges in the Commonwealth of Nations (Full Members). The Commonwealth of Nations features member-states located on all major continents and represents almost one-third of the Earth's population. Some states have signed agreements establishing multi-state regional stock exchanges while other larger states may hold more than one, or even specialised stock exchanges. Among the list include the conceptualized Commonwealth free trade area, and nations which make up the proposed CANZUK alliance.

Country	Exchange name	Location	Founded	Listings	Link
Antigua and Barbuda; Commonwealth of Dominica; Grenada; Saint Kitts and Nevis; Saint Lucia; Saint Vincent and the Grenadines	Eastern Caribbean Securities Exchange	Basseterre, Saint Kitts	2001		ECSE
Australia	Australian Securities Exchange	Sydney	1987	2,187	asx
Australia	National Stock Exchange of Australia	Sydney	1937	75	nsxa
Australia	Sydney Stock Exchange	Sydney	1997		ssx
Australia	Cboe Australia	Sydney			CXA
Commonwealth of The Bahamas	Bahamas Securities Exchange	Nassau	1999		BISX
Bangladesh	Chittagong Stock Exchange	Chittagong	1995		CSE
Bangladesh	Dhaka Stock Exchange	Dhaka	1954	750	DSE
Barbados	Barbados Stock Exchange	Bridgetown	1987		BSE
Botswana	Botswana Stock Exchange	Gaborone	1989		BSE
Cameroon	Douala Stock Exchange	Douala	2001		DSE
Canada	Canadian Securities Exchange	Toronto	2004		CSE
Canada	Montreal Exchange	Montréal	1832		MX
Canada	NASDAQ Canada	New York City	2000		Nasdaq Canada
Canada	Toronto Stock Exchange	Toronto	1861		TSX
Canada	TSX Venture Exchange	Calgary	2001		TSX
Canada	Aequitas Neo	Toronto	2015		Aequitas Neo
Cyprus	Cyprus Stock Exchange	Nicosia	1996		CSE
Fiji	South Pacific Stock Exchange	Suva	1971		SPX
Gabon	Bourse des Valeurs Mobilières de l'Afrique Centrale	Libreville	2003		BVMAC
Ghana	Ghana Stock Exchange	Accra	1989		GSE
Guyana	Guyana Stock Exchange	Georgetown	2003		GASCI
India	Bombay Stock Exchange	Mumbai	1875	5,647	BSE
India	National Stock Exchange	Mumbai	1992	2,671	NSE
India	India International Exchange	GIFT City	2017		India INX
India	NSE International Exchange	GIFT City	2017		NSE IX
India	United Stock Exchange	Mumbai	2010		USE
India	Metropolitan Stock Exchange	Mumbai	2008		MSE
India	Multi Commodity Exchange	Mumbai	2003		MCX
India	National Commodity and Derivatives Exchange	Mumbai	2003		NCDEX
India	Indian Commodity Exchange	Navi Mumbai	2017		ICEX
Jamaica	Jamaica Stock Exchange	Kingston	1968		JSE
Kenya	Nairobi Securities Exchange	Nairobi	1954	64	NSE
Lesotho	Maseru Securities Exchange	Maseru	2016		MSM
Malaysia	Bursa Malaysia	Kuala Lumpur	1964		MYX
Malaysia	Malaysia Derivatives Exchange	Kuala Lumpur	2001		
Malta	Malta Stock Exchange	Valletta	1992		MSE
Mozambique	Bolsa de Valores de Moçambique	Maputo	1999	11	BVM
New Zealand	New Zealand Exchange	Wellington	2002		
Nigeria	Nigerian Stock Exchange	Lagos	1960		
Pakistan	Pakistan Stock Exchange	Karachi	2016		PSX
Papua New Guinea	PNGX Markets Limited	Port Moresby	1999		PNGX
Rwanda	Rwanda Stock Exchange	Kigali	2011	9	RSE
The Seychelles	Seychelles Securities Exchange	Eden Island			TROP
Singapore	Singapore Exchange	Singapore	1999		SGX
Singapore	Stock Exchange of Singapore	Singapore	1973		SES
South Africa	AltX	Johannesburg	2003		AltX
South Africa	Johannesburg Stock Exchange	Johannesburg	1887		JSE
Sri Lanka	Colombo Stock Exchange	Colombo	1896	296	CSE
Tanzania	Dar es Salaam Stock Exchange	Dar es Salaam	1998	25	DSE
Trinidad and Tobago	Trinidad and Tobago Stock Exchange	Port of Spain	1981		TTSE
Uganda	ALTX East Africa Exchange	Kampala	2014		ALTX
Uganda	Uganda Securities Exchange	Kampala	1997		USE
United Kingdom	London Stock Exchange	London	1801	2,800	XLON
Zambia	Agricultural Commodities Exchange of Zambia	Lusaka	2007		ZAMACE
Zambia	Lusaka Stock Exchange	Lusaka	1993		LuSE

== Regulators ==
- Financial regulation
- Securities Commission
- Securities exchange
- Regulation D (SEC)

== See also ==
- List of stock exchanges in the United Kingdom, the British Crown Dependencies and United Kingdom Overseas Territories
- List of Commonwealth of Nations countries by GDP
- Sustainable Stock Exchanges Initiative
- List of stock market indices
- List of stock exchanges in Africa
- List of stock exchanges in the Americas
- List of South Asian stock exchanges
- List of Southeast Asian stock exchanges
- List of stock exchanges in Europe
- List of stock exchanges in Oceania
- List of stock exchanges in Western Asia
- List of countries without a stock exchange
