= Edward H. Ntalami =

Kenyan businessman (1947–2014)

Edward Ntalami
- Edward Haggai Ntalami
- Born: 19 March 1947; Meru, Kenya
- Died: 20 November 2014 (aged 67)
- Occupations: Regulator, accountant, stockbroker
- Known for: Former CEO of the Capital Markets Authority of Kenya

Edward Haggai Ntalami (19 March 1947 – 20 November 2014) was a Kenyan business executive and the former CEO of the Capital Markets Authority of Kenya (CMA).

Ntalami was involved in Kenya's capital markets over the majority of his career. He served for over two decades in financial planning and management in the fields of commerce and industry in the public sector. Prior to his appointment at the CMA, Ntalami was the executive director of Sterling Securities Limited, a local stockbroker.

He was appointed Chief Executive, Capital Markets Authority in December 2002 by President Mwai Kibaki. He completed his term in office on 17 December 2007. Seven months after he left Stella Kilonzo became head of CMA.

== Early life and education ==
Ntalami was born in Meru in Kenya and was educated at Strathmore University (formerly Strathmore College), where in 1974 he qualified as a Fellow of the Association of Chartered Certified Accountants (ACCA) of the United Kingdom. He took up employment with Housing Finance Company of Kenya (HFCK) Limited then, aged 28, was awarded a three-year scholarship by the Government of Kenya to pursue a Master of Business Administration (MBA) degree from the University of Sheffield, England.

He then returned to his homeland, where in 1979 he qualified as a member of the Institute of Certified Public Accountants (CPA), Kenya.

== Career ==
Ntalami (seated first from right) at a retreat with leading stock exchange and capital markets officials. Windsor Golf and Country Club, Nairobi, Kenya.

In 1970 he became an audit trainee with the City Council of Nairobi for two years. He later joined Magadi Soda Company (MSC) Limited, a mineral mining company, serving as an Assistant Accountant. After two years at the company, Ntalami joined international audit firm Ernst and Young. He served as a senior audit assistant, then transferred to Housing Finance Company of Kenya (HFCK) Limited, a local real estate financier, as Senior Accountant for three years.

Ntalami later served as Chief Accountant, and later, Ag. CEO, for Kenya Airways for four years.

The early 1980s, which was billed as the golden moment for local indigenous accounting firms, Ntalami became a partner at Kimani Onyancha & Company, a medium size firm of Certified Public Accountants involved primarily in the provision of statutory audits. He held special responsibility for the management consultancy services (MCS).

After ten years with KO& Co., he became a stockbroker in 1995. He served as executive director for Sterling Securities Limited (SSL), a then fledgling stock broking firm.

Here, Ntalami participated in a number of private and public share issues and flotation, including initial public offerings (IPOs), divestiture, and privatisation of public enterprises. At its peak in 1996, SSL was retained by Kenya Commercial Bank (KCB) as a sponsoring broker during its third share issue.

By 1998 the Sterling Securities Limited partnership was dissolved and, on 11 August 1999, SSL was suspended from trading on the NSE, but later resumed its operations.

Following the unexpected restructuring of the stockbroking business, Ntalami left to open and operate a Financial and Investment consultancy firm, Marited Associates. After two years, in December 2002 he was appointed Chief Executive of the Capital Markets Authority by the President replacing Paul. K. Melly, following a major cabinet and public service reshuffle.

=== Capital Markets Authority ===
Former CMA chairman, Chege Waruinge with former CMA CEO, Edward Ntalami, at a business seminar. Diani Reef Hotel, Mombassa, Kenya.

A new chairman, Chege Waruinge, the Vice-Chancellor of Gretsa University and Dean Professor Academic Affairs, United States International University (USIU), was also appointed. On 14 January 2009 Waruinge, tendered his resignation to the regulator's board.

Ntalami completed his term in office on 17 December 2007, and did not renew his contract. His departure was immediately followed by the exit of Christine Mweti, the Head of Legal Services who was second in command at CMA, who since moved to Renaissance Capital. Stella Kilonzo, was appointed the CMA acting chief executive, and confirmed as CEO on 15 July 2008

==== Highlights of tenure ====
Some of the key events that have characterised the Chief Executive's tenure include:

- Kenya Re initial public offering:

The Government sold 40 per cent of its stake in the 37-year-old reinsurance firm, or 240 million shares, through an initial public offering (IPO) at the Nairobi Stock Exchange (NSE). The IPO opened on 18 July 2007, and closed on 31 July 2007. The IPO was oversubscribed by an average of 363.5 per cent with the retail segment, recording the highest oversubscription of 715 per cent. For the first time ever, the transaction team implemented the delivery versus payment (DVP) method, which allowed institutional investors and insurance firms to hold off payment until the share allocation was completed.

Kenya Reinsurance shares closed their first day of trading at KSh15.75. This was 65.78 per cent higher than the share offer price of Sh9.50 a share, a significant gain for shareholders.

- NSE revises stock market index:

On 20 July 2007, the Nairobi Stock Exchange (NSE) revised the companies listed on its main share index to replace inactive stocks. The 20-Share Index is a reflection of the twenty (20) most actively trading counters in Kenya and was last reviewed in May 2003.

In the financial sector, ICDCI replaced NIC Bank, while in the industrial sector; KenGen replaced BOC Gases, whose shares were suspended following the proposed merger with Carbacid Investments (see below). In the Agricultural sector, Rea Vipingo replaced Kakuzi, whereas, Mumias Sugar Company replaced Unilever Tea. In the Commercial and Service Sector, CMC replaced Uchumi Supermarkets Limited (under receivership – see below).

The review of the NSE 20-share index was done to bring on board newly listed firms with active trading track-records and would see the NSE market capitalisation increase substantially with the entry of the profitable firms from the country's fastest growing economic sectors. It is expected that this will give the market a better image, which reflects the true value of the bourse as opposed to retaining less active stocks in the Index.

- AccessKenya initial public offering:

On 4 June 2007 the AccessKenya Group was listed on the Nairobi Stock Exchange, becoming the first Information Communication Technology (ICT) company to do so. The web firm, which provides wireless access and email, said the listing for 800 million Kenyan shillings (US$11.9 million) was oversubscribed by 363% with every category, from wealthy investors to institutional investors being fully subscribed.

The IPO also heralded the creation of a fifth investment segment at the bourse – the technology sector. This is in addition to the already existing agricultural, commercial and services, finance and investment and industrial and allied sectors.

The shares began trading at Sh14 with 1,000,000 shares changing hands within an hour of the opening bell.

- The Carbacid Investments vs BOC Group tussle:

An attempted takeover bid of Carbacid Investments by BOC Group was aborted after the capital markets regulator declined to endorse the deal. In May 2006, the CMA argued that the latter had not met all the terms it had stated in an offer to Carbacid shareholders. The critical condition in the deal to warrant the takeover and subsequent delisting of Carbacid from the NSE was that at least 80 per cent of Carbacid shareholders had to back the takeover transaction, but only owners holding 71.0 per cent backed the transaction. Ironically, a ruling by the Capital Markets Tribunal okayed the takeover forcing the CMA to appeal against the ruling. Mr Ntalami said the approval of the takeover deal was likely to set a bad precedent that would plunge future takeovers of listed companies into chaos.

The protracted takeover saga, that has seen the two counters suspended for over four(4) years was resolved in November 2009, as trading in carbon dioxide manufacturer Carbacid shares resumed after suspension since 2005.

- Electronic trading commences at the NSE:

On 11 September 2006 the Nairobi Stock Exchange migrated from the hitherto Open Outcry system to the Automated Trading System (ATS), an electronic trading platform. The President commissioned the new technology on 25 October 2006.

The change is expected to double the value of shares traded each day on the bourse with enhanced integrity and efficiency. Investors are now able to access current information thus facilitating them to make informed investment decisions on timely basis.

On 17 December 2007, the NSE completed its migration from the open outcry trading floor method to an all-encompassing wide area network (WAN) trading system which allows stockbrokers to trade from the comfort of their offices.

- Equity Bank listing:

Listing and official trading of Equity Bank shares on the NSE commenced on 7 August 2006; a day which saw the price move from Kes. 70 to Kes. 158 in a single price setting deal involving 1000 shares.

- ScanGroup Ltd. IPO:

On 17 July 2006, the initial public offering of Scangroup Limited shares kicked off what was to be a historical listing at the NSE. Scangroup, became the first marketing services company in Africa to go public through an IPO. The advertising house, an intelligence-intensive outfit, offloaded 69 million company shares into the capital markets at an offer price of Kes 10.45 per share. The IPO was oversubscribed by 520% and official trading of the company's shares on the NSE) commenced on 29 August 2006.

The Scangroup share price rose by 39% on its first day of trading to close the day at Kes. 15 with 3, 056,000 shares exchanging hands.

- KenGen IPO:

In April 2006, the Government offloaded 659.51 million shares in Kenya Electric Generating Company (KenGen) through the capital markets. The IPO premiered at the NSE at a discounted price of Kes. 11.90 price before rallying to a high of Sh40, representing a massive fourfold jump. The success of the IPO is credited for spurring the current appetite and excitement for investing in Kenya.

On 25 April 2007, an intended secondary offer for the shares, in pursuance of the IPO's initial success, was abruptly postponed by former Finance Minister Amos Kimunya attributing the move to the prevailing share price being very low and the bulk tariff conflict between Kengen and KPLC.

- CFCStanbic Bank rights issue:

On 23 December 2005, CFCStanbic Bank officially listed 12.0 million new shares, arising out of its successfully completed rights issue. The bank succeeded in raising the Kes. 744 million (US$10 million) needed to align its capital base with Central Bank of Kenya risk management guidelines.

- Uchumi Supermarkets rights issue:

In October 2005, the retail chain, already facing serious financial challenges, received approval from the CMA for its shareholders to inject an extra Kes. 1.1 billion (US$15 million) through a rights share issue.

In May 2007, a year after the near-collapse of the retail supermarket, attention shifted to renewed efforts toward the retail chain's tortuous recovery strategy. The company's receiver-managers, led by Mr Jonanthan Ciano, offered shareholders yet another chance to inject Sh800 million (U.S$. 11.4 million) into the company under a new recapitalisation plan. Analysts then observed that were the plan to fail due to shareholder reluctance, the retail chain would have to find a new equity partner to fund its recovery.

- KCB rights issue:

The highly successful Kenya Commercial Bank rights issue in September 2004, mobilised in excess of Kes. 2.3 billion (US$31 million) needed for the bank's growth strategy. The rights offer for 50 million shares at a price of Kshs 49.00, was oversubscribed by 12.25%, necessitating a refund of Kes. 310 million (US$4.1million) to applicants following shortage of untaken rights for allotment.

Ntalami and Mbaru at an NSE Board Retreat. Great Rift Valley Lodge, Naivasha.

== Recognition ==
- Kenya's secondary bond market voted among the best in Africa: A report released by the International Monetary Fund (IMF), in April 2007, ranked Kenya's secondary bond market as among the most vibrant in Africa, coming only third to South Africa and Mauritius. The World Regional Economic Survey for April 2007 reports that, "Kenya's lengthening maturities which has allowed better pricing of debt instruments, puts it among the few countries in Africa with a vibrant debt market."
- The overwhelming success of the KenGen IPO was widely commended for generating a lot of awareness in investments among ordinary Kenyans of all ages, professions and income levels. The landmark IPO led to a massive interest in opening stock brokerage accounts and investing in Kenya. According to the Central Depository and Settlement Corporation (CDSC), the number of people with CDS accounts increased significantly and as at the end of June 2007 stood at over 750,000 accounts up from 78,300 in December 2005; a noteworthy tenfold increase in only one-and-a-half years.
- Many have also commended Ntalami for his resolve in rejecting plans to use a bookbuilding approach to allocate the KenGen shares. The initial plan is said to have been abandoned after it appeared to be biased against the small investor.
- Under Ntalami's watch at the healm, the NSE 20 Share Index posted a historic mark, surpassing its previous all-time high of 5,030 points, hit on 18 February 1994. As at close of trading on 10 November 2006 it stood at 5654.46 points. The NSE index has delivered an unprecedented growth in excess of over 300% over the last two and a half years.

Nelius Kariuki, the Kenya Reinsurance MD, rings the bell during the opening of the Kenya Re IPO. Looking on (back-left) is former CMA CEO Edward Ntalami.

- For over a decade since March 1996, the NSE had only listed three new companies, namely Kenya Airways, Mumias and ICID-I. In under four years of the former Chief Executive's tenure, the bourse witnessed the successful launch of six IPOs, namely KenGen, Scangroup, Eveready East Africa (listed with an oversubscription of over 800%), Mumias Sugar and AccessKenya Group (listed with an oversubscription of 363%) and recently Kenya Re (see photo (right)); including the oversubscription of five Rights Issues, namely KCB Bank, CFCStanbic Bank, Uchumi Supermarkets, Diamond Trust and Olympia Capital. Ntalami left office just prior to the landmark listing of Safaricom, the leading mobile telecommunications service provider in the country.
- The Year of the IPO: 2006 was hailed as "The Year of the IPO" by Madabhushi Soundarajan, former managing director, CFCStanbic Bank and CFC Financial Services. "You can call 2006 the Year of the Initial Public Offer where many Kenyans saw the benefit of the stock market to make wealth" he said, through a supplement/advertising feature released in the country's leading newspaper, Daily Nation on 13 December 2006. CFCStanbic Bank is part of the CFCStanbic Group whose Total Assets then stood at over KShs 16 billion. In line with this, James Murigu, the former managing director of Suntra Investment Bank, has commended the CMA's pace in processing of new applications for bourse listings.
- The CMA has been lauded by the private sector and newly listed companies for reviving confidence in Kenya's capital markets which has in turn translated into active participation from both manufacturing and service sectors. In August 2007, Renaissance Capital – a major multinational investment bank, was granted license to operate in Kenya. RenCap commended the regulator for the speedy processing of its application which showed its commitment to deepening the capital markets in Kenya.
- Investor Education and Awareness Programmes: On 30 January 2006 the CMA hosted a major Workshop at the Grand Regency Hotel, Nairobi, inviting leading media houses, journalists and industry players, both local and international, to train them on the tenets of good capital markets reporting. The CMA also participated in the Mombasa and Nairobi Agricultural Society of Kenya (ASK) shows in August and October 2006 respectively, where the Authority won an award for the Best Financial Institutions stand at the Mombasa ASK. CMA has in the past hosted a number of seminars including one for State Corporations. Also, in May 2007, the market regulator begun supplement releases to educate the public on the capital markets.

== Criticism ==
- Ntalami, a former stockbroker, and Jimnah Mbaru (current NSE chairman and stockbroker), have been criticised in the past of being inappropriate to self-regulate the capital markets because their affiliations to capital markets could create potential conflicts of interest. The NSE (and its top management) have in the past come under fire for being an 'exclusive club' tightly controlled by an eighteen (18) member team of existing market brokers and investment banks. In fact, in a recent attempt to debunk this perception, it was reported on 3 August 2007 that the NSE would put up for sale a seat on its executive board at an estimated reserve price of Ksh 300 million (US$4.5million). The coveted seat was clinched on 21 August 2007 by Renaissance Capital.
- Corporate bonds: There have been few corporate bonds approved since the beginning of 2006. The domestic bond market is widely viewed as under-developed, an observation made by Ntalami. A report released in April 2007 by the International Monetary Fund ranked Kenya's secondary bond market as being among the best in Africa, coming third only to South Africa and Mauritius. The outstanding value of corporate bonds as at the end of October 2006 rose to Kes. 8.6 billion ($123 million) following the issue of the second tranche of Shelter Afrique in October.
- Media shy: Unlike his contemporaries such as NSE chairman Jimnah Mbaru, Suntra Investment Bank's James Murigu and Standard Investment Bank's James Wangunyu, who do not mind the public limelight, Ntalami has by far and large curved out a quiet demeanor. There have been calls for the Chief Executive to be more visible and for the CMA to create a better communications/PR mechanism. Reacting to this, the CMA recently made efforts to bolster its human resource capacity. On 10 July 2007, it moved to recruit new personnel for various departments in financial, public relations, legal, research, IT and compliance. The recruitment is to be done through a human resources placement firm Osano and & Associates.

== Succession table at CMA Kenya ==
Preceded by Paul K. Melly; 1998 -2002	CEO Capital Markets Authority (Kenya); 2002 – 2007	Succeeded by Stella Kilonzo; 2008 – present

Previous Chief Executives of the CMA (Kenya), include (a) William Chelashaw, who served from 1992 until 1997 and (b) Paul K. Melly, who served from 1998 until 2002.

== Family and personal life ==
Ntalami's children include Michelle Ntalami, founder of natural hair care brand Marini Naturals and Vincent Ntalami founder of Innova Limited a software development company based in Kenya.

He died on 20 November 2014 after a long battle with cancer at the age of 67.
