= Ethiopian Person of the Year =

Annual issue of Ethiopian news portal Jimma Times

Ethiopian Person of the Year is an annual issue of the Ethiopian news portal Jimma Times, formerly the private Yeroo newspaper, which names and profiles the person(s) who was (were) the most influential and had the most impact on the Ethiopian people during the previous Ethiopian calendar year.

== History ==
Jimma Times's tradition of selecting the "Ethiopian Person of the Year" honor began during the new Ethiopian millennium (year 2000, Western calendar 2007/2008) when the multi-Olympic champion Kenenisa Bekele was selected. It established the multi-language (Afaan Oromo, Amharic and English) private newspaper Yeroo the following year. The word yeroo means "time" or times" in the Oromo language and its style was to mirror the American Time news magazine which also publishes its annual Person of the Year selections. Yeroo newspaper stopped publication in Ethiopia after only a few months but Jimma Times website continues to operate.

Though many other Ethiopian media outlets make their own annual selections, Jimma Times's independent selection is the only one that often features interviews of the nominees and special report articles on the work of the winner(s). The winner for the award during Ethiopian calendar year 2001 was the peace activist, founder of the first private bank Awash and leading politician Bulcha Demeksa while the CEO and founder of Ethiopia Commodity Exchange Dr. Eleni Gabre-Madhin won the honor in 2002.

== Persons of the Year list ==
Ethiopian year	Choice	Notes	Runner up
2000	Ethiopia Kenenisa Bekele	Inspirational multi-Olympic champion	Teddy Afro
2001	Ethiopia Bulcha Demeksa	Human rights and peace activist, private bank, OFDM	Tirunesh Dibaba
2002	Ethiopia Dr. Eleni Gabre-Madhin	Ethiopia Commodity Exchange, "market revolution"	Girma Wake
