= African Securities Exchanges Association =

Trade association of African stock exchanges

- Abbreviation: ASEA
- Formation: 1993; 33 years ago
- Legal status: Non-profit organisation
- Purpose: Trade association for securities exchanges in the Africa region
- Location: Nairobi, Kenya
- Region served: Africa
- Members: 26 full members and six associate members
- Website: african-exchanges.org

African Securities Exchanges Association (ASEA) is a trade association for securities exchanges in Africa headquartered in Nairobi, Kenya. The associations aim is to provide a formal framework for the mutual co-operation of securities exchanges in the African region. Its functions include the exchange of information and assistance in the development of member exchanges.

As of 2022, there were 30 exchanges in Africa, representing 39 nations' capital markets. At that time, ASEA had 26 full members and six associate members.

== Member Organisations ==
- Bolsa de Valores de Cabo Verde - Praia, Cape Verde
- Bolsa de Valores de Mozambique - Maputo, Mozambique
- Botswana Stock Exchange - Gaborone, Botswana
- Bourse Regionale des Valeurs Mobilieres - Abidjan, Côte d'Ivoire
- Bourse des Valeurs Mobilières de Tunis - Tunis, Tunisia
- Casablanca Stock Exchange - Casablanca, Morocco
- Egyptian Exchange - Cairo, Egypt
- FMDQ Securities Exchange - Lagos, Nigeria
- Dar es Salaam Stock Exchange - Dar es Salaam, Tanzania
- Douala Stock Exchange - Douala, Cameroon
- Ghana Stock Exchange - Accra, Ghana
- JSE Limited - Sandton, South Africa
- Khartoum Stock Exchange - Khartoum, Sudan
- Libyan Stock Market - Tripoli, Libya
- Lusaka Stock Exchange - Lusaka, Zambia
- Malawi Stock Exchange - Blantyre, Malawi
- Nairobi Stock Exchange - Nairobi, Kenya (Now Nairobi Securities Exchange Limited)
- Namibian Stock Exchange - Windhoek, Namibia
- Nigerian Stock Exchange - Lagos, Nigeria
- Rwanda Stock Exchange - Kigali, Rwanda
- Stock Exchange of Mauritius - Port Louis, Mauritius
- Sierra Leone Stock Exchange - Sierra Leone
- Uganda Securities Exchange Limited - Kampala, Uganda
- Zimbabwe Stock Exchange - Harare, Zimbabwe

In addition, the African Securities Exchanges maintains a partnership agreement with the Federation of Euro-Asian Stock Exchanges.

== See also ==
- List of stock exchanges
