= Paul Muthaura =

Kenyan lawyer

- Born: Kenya
- Citizenship: Kenya
- Education: University of Warwick (Bachelor of Laws); London School of Economics and Political Science (Master of Laws); Maastricht School of Management (Master of Philosophy) (Doctor of Business Administration)
- Occupations: Lawyer, Business Executive
- Years active: 2000 — present
- Known for: Legal Affairs, Business Administration
- Title: CEO; Capital Markets Authority

Paul Murithi Muthaura is a lawyer and administrator in Kenya. He is the immediate former Chief Executive of the Capital Markets Authority (Kenya). He was appointed to that position on 22 April 2016, retroactive from 2 January 2016. Prior to that, he served in the same position, in an acting capacity since July 2012, following the resignation of Stella Kilonzo, in June 2012.

== Education ==
He holds a Bachelor of Laws degree from the University of Warwick and a Master of Laws in Banking and Finance Law, from the London School of Economics and Political Science. According to the website of the Insurance Regulatory Authority of Kenya, as of April 2016, he was pursuing a Doctorate in Business Administration at the Maastricht School of Management (MSM). He also holds a Master of Philosophy from the MSM.

== Career ==
Muthaura has previously worked as an Emerging Markets Advisor, at the General Secretariat of the International Organization of Securities Commissions (IOSCO), based in Madrid, Spain. Before moving into the regulatory industry he was a senior commercial associate with the law firm of Daly and Figgis Advocates. He is a member of the board of (IOSCO), the Financial Stability Board (FSB) Regional Consultative Group for Sub-Saharan Africa, and the Consultative Committee of the East African Securities Regulatory Authorities (EASRA). He also sits on the boards of the Insurance Regulatory Authority, the Retirement Benefits Authority and the Vision 2030 Delivery Board.

After serving as the Chief Executive of the Capital Markets Authority (Kenya), Muthaura was appointed the principal officer at ICEA LION General Insurance in October 2020, and served until September 2021, when he stepped down according to medical advice to allow recuperation from an injury in early 2021.

He is an advocate of the High Court of Kenya.

== See also ==
- Nairobi Securities Exchange

== Succession table at CMA (Kenya) ==
Preceded by Stella Kilonzo; 2008 - 2012	CEO Capital Markets Authority (Kenya); 2012 - Present	Succeeded by Incumbent; 2012 - Present

Previous Chief Executives of the CMA (Kenya), include (a) William Chelashaw, who served from 1992 until 1997 and (b) Paul K. Melly, who served from 1998 until 2002.
