= Bolsa de Valores =

Bolsa de Valores (often shortened to Bolsa), Spanish and Portuguese for Stock Exchange, can refer to:

- B3, São Paulo; Brazil's largest stock exchange
- Bolsa de Madrid, Spain
- Bolsa de Valores de Cabo Verde, Cape Verde
- Bolsa de Valores de Montevideo, Uruguay
- Bolsa de Valores de Mozambique
- Bolsa de Valores de Nicaragua
- Bolsa de Valores de la República Dominicana
- Bolsa de Valores y Productos de Asunción, Paraguay
- Euronext Lisbon, Portugal
- Bolsa de Valores de Colombia (or BVC), Colombian Securities Exchange
- Bolsa de Valores de Lima (or BVL), Lima Stock Exchange, Peru
- Bolsa de Valores de Caracas (or BVC), Caracas Stock Exchange, Venezuela
- Bolsa Mexicana de Valores (or BMV), Mexican Stock Exchange
- Bolsa de Valores do Rio de Janeiro (or BVRJ), Rio de Janeiro Stock Exchange, Brazil's second largest stock exchange

== See also ==
- List of stock exchanges in the Americas
