= BOC Kenya Limited =

BOC Kenya plc
- Type: Public
- Traded as: KN: BOC
- Industry: Mafufacture of medical & industrial gases
- Founded: 9 December 1940; 85 years ago in Mombasa, Kenya
- Headquarters: Nairobi, Kenya
- Key people: Ngungi Kiuna, chairman Millicent Onyonyi, executive director
- Products: List: Helium, mining calibration mixtures, refrigerants, packaged chemicals, fire suppression equipment, laser gas and scientific mixtures; oxygen, nitrogen, air, argon, carbon dioxide, hydrogen, acetylene and shielding gases, and liquefied petroleum gas and propane
- Revenue: ▲ Aftertax: KES:101,255,000 (US$1,017,000) (H1:2013)
- Total assets: KES:1.975 billion (US$19.84 million) (H1:2013)
- Website: Homepage

BOC Kenya plc (BOCKL), also BOC Kenya, is a manufacturing company in Kenya. It manufactures and markets industrial and medical gases.

== Location ==
The company headquarters are located on Kitui Road, in the Industrial Area of Nairobi, Kenya's capital and largest city. The coordinates of the company headquarters are: 1°18'18.0"S, 36°51'02.0"E (Latitude:-1.304990; Longitude:36.850546).

== Overview ==
BOCKL is a subsidiary of the Linde plc, an international manufacturing and engineering conglomerate founded in Germany in 1879, with subsidiaries in over 100 countries. The company is involved in the production and sale of industrial and medical gases, welding products, power tools and medical equipment.

== History ==
In December 2005, BOC Kenya plc attempted to take over the shareholding in Carbacid Investments, with the aim of making it a wholly owned subsidiary. However, BOC Kenya did not receive the 80 percent acceptance threshold from Carbacid shareholders, managing only 71 percent. This led to a dispute between BOC Kenya and the Capital Markets Authority. Both the BOC Kenya and Carbacid stocks remained suspended from trading on the NSE from 2005 until 2009, when the hostile takeover offer lapsed.

== Subsidiaries ==
BOCKL maintains the following registered subsidiaries:

- BOC Tanzania Limited – Dar es Salaam, Tanzania
- BOC Uganda Limited – Kampala, Uganda
- Kivuli Limited – Mombasa, Kenya
- East African Oxygen Limited – Dormant

== Ownership ==
The shares of BOC Kenya plc are listed on the NSE, where they trade under the symbol BOC. The shareholding in the stock of the company are illustrated in the table below:

BOC Kenya plc Stock ownership
Rank	Name of owner	Percentage ownership
1	BOC Holdings*	65.38
2	Institutional & private investors at NSE	34.62
	Total	100.00

*BOC Holdings is a wholly owned subsidiary of Linde Group.

== See also ==
- Nairobi Securities Exchange
- Economy of Kenya
