= Rwanda Over The Counter Exchange =

BUUTAY K BUU

- Type: Parastatal
- Industry: Stock exchange
- Founded: 2008
- Defunct: 31 January 2011
- Successor: Rwanda Stock Exchange
- Headquarters: Kigali, Rwanda
- Owner: Government of Rwanda

The Rwanda Over The Counter Market (ROTCE) was a stock market in Rwanda. It was founded on 31 January 2008 and operated out of Kigali, the capital city of Rwanda. The market was run by the Rwandan government, with ambitions to become independent. Initially the exchange only sold bonds - one offered by the country's central bank, the National Bank of Rwanda; and one by the Commercial Bank of Rwanda. In 2009, equities began being listed on the exchange.

== Market listing ==
As of December 2010 the listed equities on the exchange are as summarized in the table below.

Symbol	Company	Notes
BLRW	Bralirwa	Brewing, bottling
KCB	KCB Group	Finance, banking
NMG	Nation Media Group	Publishing, printing, broadcasting, television

- Kenya Commercial Bank Group is crosslisted on the Nairobi Stock Exchange, Dar es Salaam Stock Exchange and Rwanda Over The Counter Exchange.
- Nation Media Group is crosslisted on the Nairobi Stock Exchange and Uganda Securities Exchange.

== Cessation of activities and replacement ==
On 31 January 2011, the activities of Rwanda Over The Counter Exchange were taken over by the Rwanda Stock Exchange, whose activities are supervised by the Capital Markets Advisory Council (CMAC).

== See also ==
- List of African stock exchanges
