= East Africa Exchange =

Stock exchange in Kigali, Rwanda - East Africa

Coordinates: 01°56′37″S 30°03′34″E

- Type: Commodities exchange
- Location: Kigali, Rwanda
- Founded: July 2014
- Commodities: Agricultural; Mineral
- Website: www.ea-africaexchange.com

The East Africa Exchange (EAX), also, East African Commodity Exchange, is a privately funded regional, agricultural commodities exchange in East Africa. It was launched in Kigali, Rwanda, in July 2014. EAX is the third-largest agricultural commodities exchange in Africa, behind the South African Futures Exchange and the Ethiopia Commodity Exchange.

== Location ==
The headquarters of EAX are located on the 12th Floor, at Kigali City Tower, Avenue du Commerce, in the city of Kigali, the capital of Rwanda. The coordinates of the headquarters of EAX are:1°56'37.0"S, 30°03'34.0"E (Latitude:-1.943601; Longitude:30.059431).

== Overview ==
The primary objective of the exchange is to facilitate farmers and producers of agricultural produce with obtaining fair prices for their goods and merchandise and in accessing reasonable funding for their businesses. Starting with maize and beans, the exchange plans to expand into coffee, tea, and rice. As of March 2016, EAX is operational in Rwanda and Kenya with plans to enter Uganda in 2016.

== Shareholding ==
The table below illustrates the shareholding in EAX:

East Africa Exchange Stock Ownership
Rank	Name of Owner	Percentage Ownership
1	Heirs Holdings Plc.	
2	Berggruen Holdings S.A.	
3	50 Ventures Inc.	
4	Ngali Holdings Limited	
	Total	100.00

- The shares of the first three shareholders are jointly held in an investment vehicle called Africa Exchange Holdings Limited (AFEX)

== See also ==
- List of African stock exchanges
- Rwanda Stock Exchange
- Partnership for Enhancing Agriculture in Rwanda through Linkages
