= Bolsa =

Bolsa or Pelota may refer to

- Bolsa de Valores (disambiguation), a stock exchange in Spanish and Portuguese speaking countries
- Bank of London and South America
- La Bolsa, a town in Uruguay
- Juan Bolsa, a character in the US TV series Breaking Bad

== See also ==
- Bolsa Familia, a government grant in Brazil
- Palacio da Bolsa, Porto, Portugal
