= Atef Yassien El Sherif =

Atef Yassien ElSherif was the former chairman of the Egyptian Exchange (July 2013 – August 2013), the former chairman counselors of the Egyptian Exchange and the founder and principal partner of ElSherif Law Firm & Consultants. ElSherif has represented the Egyptian Exchange in various stock exchange conferences and international, African and Arabian stock market unions, and contributed to the preparation of much legislation and Egyptian stock market rules since joining the Egyptian Exchange in 1994 to 2015. He has also contributed to establishing the Damascus Securities Exchange and the Libyan Stock Market. He also is the founder and board member of the Egyptian Investor Relations Association (EIRA).

ElSherif has published a book titled Stock Exchange: Conflict between Bulls & Bears, and another entitled "Small & Medium-sized Enterprises".
