= Gitahi =

Gitahi is a surname of Kenyan origin. Notable people with the surname include:

- Githinji Gitahi (born 1970), Kenyan medical doctor
- Godfrey Gitahi Kariuki (1938–2017), Kenyan politician
- Julius Gitahi (born 1978), Kenyan long-distance runner
- Linus Gitahi (born 1964), Kenyan businessman and executive
- Mercy Wanjiru Gitahi (born 1993), Kenyan athletics competitor
- Robert Gitahi (born 1962), Kenyan Professor
