= Stella Kilonzo =

Kenyan accountant (born 1972)

- Born: 20 June 1972 (age 54); Kenya
- Education: Catholic University of Eastern Africa (BCom); Loyola University (MBA); Certified Public Accountant (CPA)
- Occupations: Accountant, business executive
- Years active: 2008 — present
- Known for: Business administration
- Title: Manager; African Development Bank

Stella Kilonzo is a Kenyan accountant and business administrator. She is the immediate past Chief Executive Officer of the Capital Markets Authority (Kenya). She was appointed to that position in July 2008, and she voluntarily stepped down at the end of her renewable four-year term in June 2012. She currently serves as manager of the financial sector development division, at the African Development Bank. She was appointed to that position in December 2013.

== Background and education ==
She studied at the Catholic University of Eastern Africa (CUEA), graduating with the degree of Bachelor of Commerce. Later, she attended Loyola University in Chicago, Illinois in the United States. She graduated from Loyola with the degree of Master of Business Administration, specializing in corporate finance. Kilonzo also holds a qualification as a Certified Public Accountant (CPA), obtained in the United States.

== Work history ==
Following her training in the United States of America, Kilonzo worked in the securities market regulation at Financial Industry Regulatory Authority (FINRA) in Chicago, Illinois, USA for four and half years. She then returned to Kenya and worked at Pricewaterhouse Coopers (PwC), as a Senior Associate in the Corporate Finance Advisory Services Department. She was the Chairperson of the East Africa Securities Regulatory Authorities (EASRA), a forum for East African Capital markets regulators, from 2008 to 2010. In her capacity as the CEO at the CMA (Kenya), she also sat on the Insurance Regulatory Authority in Kenya. Kilonzo was also an ex-officio member of the Retirement Benefits Authority of Kenya. Prior to being confirmed as CEO of the CMA Kenya, she served as Acting Chief Executive Officer of the CMA (Kenya) from 2007 until 2008. Following four years as the CMA chief executive, she declined consideration to serve a second four-year term as CEO. She stepped down on 30 June 2012. In December 2013, she was appointed to a managerial position at the African Development Bank (AfDB), as head of the division for financial sector development.

== Personal life ==
Stella Kilonzo is married and is the mother of two sons.

== See also ==
- Nancy Onyango
- Capital Markets Authority (Kenya)
- Loyola University Chicago
- Catholic University of Eastern Africa

== Succession table at CMA (Kenya) ==
Preceded by Edward H. Ntalami; 2002 - 2007	CEO Capital Markets Authority (Kenya); 2008 - 2012	Succeeded by Paul Muthaura; 2012 - Present

Previous Chief Executives of the CMA (Kenya), include (a) William Chelashaw, who served from 1992 until 1997 and (b) Paul K. Melly, who served from 1998 until 2002.
