= CVL =

CVL may refer to:

- The Center for Vital Longevity
- Cerebrovascular lesion
- Chattahoochee Valley Libraries
- Chinese Volleyball Super League
- Coachella Valley Lakers, an American minor league basketball team
- Corpo Volontari della Libertà of the Italian Resistance
- Creditors voluntary liquidation
- Crystal Ventures, a Rwandan holding company
- Ezrin, a protein
- Light aircraft carrier
