= Crystal Telecom Rwanda =

Rwandan holding company

Coordinates: 1°56′47.2″S 30°3′37.4″E

Crystal Telecom
- Company type: Public: RSE: CTL
- Industry: Telecommunications
- Predecessor: Crystal Ventures Limited
- Founded: January 1, 2013; 13 years ago
- Headquarters: Kigali, Rwanda
- Area served: Rwanda
- Key people: Iza Irame; Chief Executive Officer
- Products: Shareholding in Mobile Network Provider
- Revenue: ▲Aftertax:RWF:1.289 billion (US$1.4 million) (2019)
- Total assets: RWF:24.038 billion (US$26 million) (2019)
- Parent: Crystal Ventures
- Website: www.crystaltelecom.co.rw

Crystal Telecom Rwanda, commonly referred to as Crystal Telecom, is a special purpose vehicle company of Crystal Ventures, a holding company owned by the Rwandan presidential party, Rwandese Patriotic Front. It is listed on the Rwanda Stock Exchange with its headquarters in Kigali, Rwanda. The firm holds a 20 percent stake in MTN Rwandancell as its only investment.

== History ==
Crystal Telecom was formed in 2013 when Crystal Ventures, a holding company owned by the Rwandese Patriotic Front, the Rwandan presidential party, spun off its shareholding in MTN Rwandantell to its newly incorporated subsidiary through an IPO. The IPO was conducted in June 2015 and was over-subscribed by 123 percent.

Crystal Telecom is a special purpose vehicle company that owns 20 percent of MTN Rwandacell, a member of the MTN Group. As of 2015, that shareholding was its only investment. The company's shares started trading on the Rwanda Stock Exchange on 17 July 2015 under the symbol CTL, making it the third local company to list on the exchange, behind Bralirwa and Bank of Kigali.

As of December 2019, Crystal Telecom had total assets of RWF:24.038 billion (US$26 million), with shareholders equity of RWF:23,971 billion (US$25.9 million).

In 2021, the company closed and delisted from RSE as it became part of MTN Rwanda.

== Location ==
Crystal Telecom maintains its headquarters in the offices of Crystal Ventures, a holding company owned by the presidential party, at Grand Pension Plaza, on the 14th Floor, at 2 KN 3 Avenue, in Kigali, Rwanda's capital and largest city. The geographical coordinates of the company's headquarters are:01°56'47.2"S, 30°03'37.4"E (Latitude:-1.946444; Longitude:30.060389).

== Governance ==
The company is supervised by a five-person board of directors. The table below illustrates the members of the board as of 31 December 2017. Evelyn Kamagaju Rutawenda was the chairperson and Iza Irame was the chief executive officer.

Composition of the Board of Crystal Telecom Limited
Rank	Board Member	Position	Notes
1	Evelyn Kamagaju Rutawenda	Chairperson	
2	Iza Irame	Chief Executive Officer	
3	Cherno Gaye	Member	
4	John Bosco Sebabi	Member	
5	David Daluisen	Member	
	Total	5	

== See also ==
- MTN Group
- Rwanda Stock Exchange
