= Eaagads Limited =

- Industry: Food
- Founded: 1946; 79 years ago
- Headquarters: Nairobi
- Area served: Kenya
- Products: Coffee
- Website: www.eaagads.co.ke

Eaagads Limited is a Coffee company in Kenya. It has headquarters in Nairobi and farms in Kiambu county. Eaagads Limited was incorporated in 1946 and is listed on the Nairobi Securities Exchange and trades under the symbol EGAD.

Eaagads is engaged growing, blending, and selling of coffee products both locally and in the international market. It is controlled and managed by Kofinaf Company Limited, a company registered in the Republic of Kenya. Kofinaf holds 61.74% of the share capital of Eaagads

In 2010, the company sold some of its land to Tatu City, a property development project by Moscow-based Renaissance Partners. This led to a price rally of the companies shares of 63.5% driven by investor expectations of huge gains from Kenya's booming real estate sector. This rally come to an end when the firm's management clarified that Eaagads was not part of the Tatu City Project and would continue to operate as a Coffee company.

== See also ==
- Nairobi Stock Exchange
