= List of mobile network operators in Rwanda =

This is a list of mobile network operators in Rwanda:

- MTN Rwandacell Plc
- Airtel Rwanda

== Market share ==
As of 31 December 2020, the market share among Rwandan mobile telephone operators was as depicted in the table below.

Market share among mobile network operators in Rwanda
Rank	Name of operator	Millions of customers	Market share (%)
1	MTN Rwanda	6,557,073	61.8
2	Airtel Rwanda	4,057,335	38.2
	Total	10,614,408	100.00

Note:Totals are slightly off due to rounding.

== See also ==
- Economy of Rwanda
