= List of African stock exchanges =

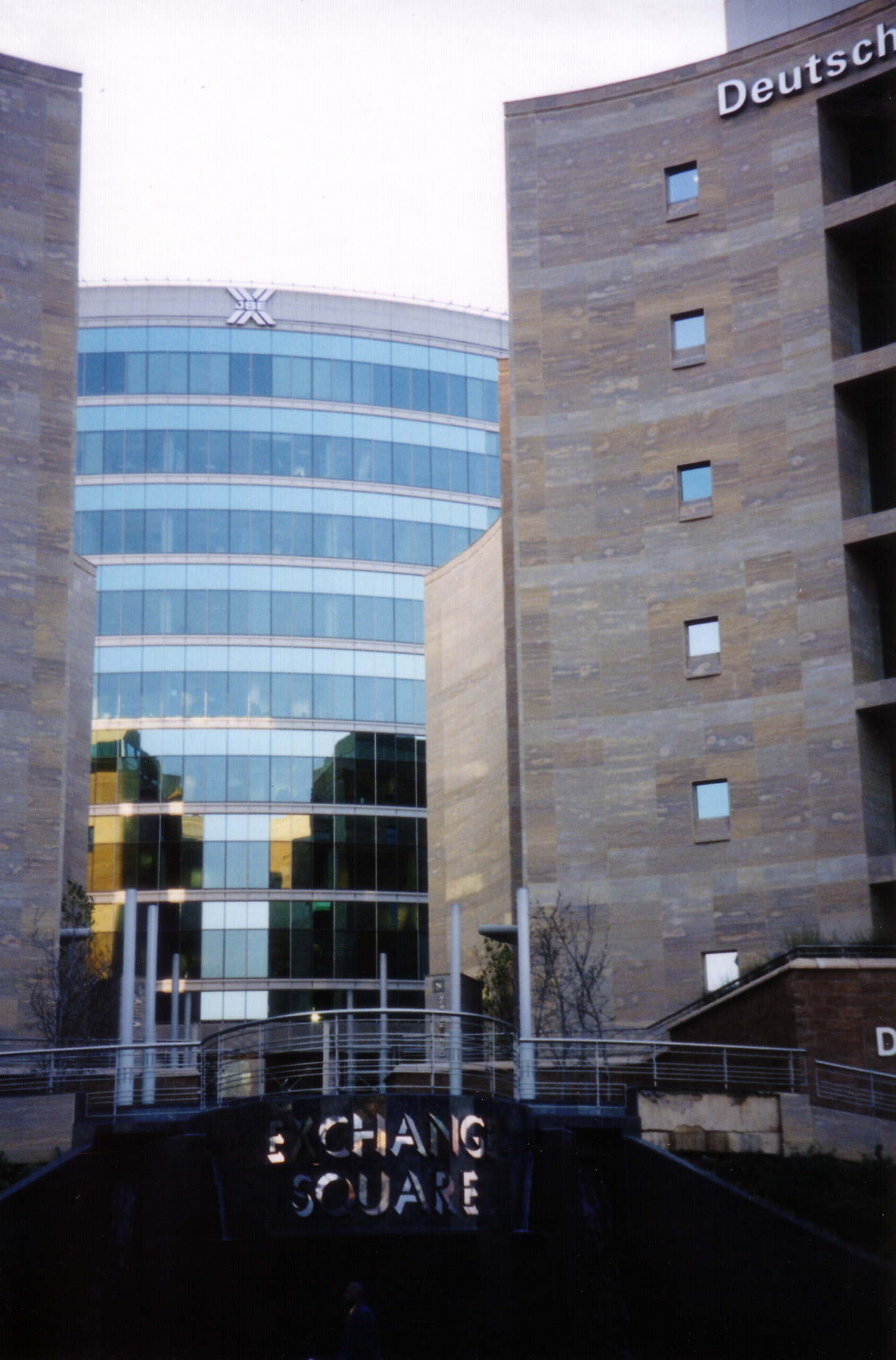
The Johannesburg Stock Exchange, the largest stock exchange in Africa

There are 38 exchanges in Africa, representing 29 nations' capital markets.

22 of the 38 stock exchanges in Africa are members of the African Securities Exchanges Association (ASEA). ASEA members are indicated below by an asterisk (*).

The Egyptian Exchange (EGX), founded in 1883, is the oldest stock exchange in Africa. One of the oldest bourses (exchanges) on the continent is the Casablanca Stock Exchange of Morocco, founded in 1929 and the JSE Limited in 1887 and Nairobi Securities Exchange in Kenya founded in 1954.

Today the top five largest securities exchanges in Africa are Johannesburg Stock Exchange (JSE), Egyptian Exchange (EGX), Nigerian Stock Exchange (NGX), Casablanca stock exchange in Morocco and Nairobi Securities Exchange (NSE) in Kenya.

The most recent stock exchange is the Ethiopian Stock Exchange, which opened in 2025, through a public-private partnership.

There are several notable countries on the continent that do not have a stock exchange.

== List ==
Economy	Exchange	Location	Founded	Listings	Link	Technology
Algeria	Algiers Stock Exchange	Algiers	1997	6	SGBV	
Angola	Angola Debt and Stock Exchange	Luanda	2017	14	Bodiva	InfoTech Capizar
Botswana	Botswana Stock Exchange*	Gaborone	1989	53	BSE	
Cape Verde	Bolsa de Valores de Cabo Verde*	Praia	1998	4	BVC	
Egypt	Egyptian Exchange*	Cairo, Alexandria	1883	303	EGX	Nasdaq
Eswatini	Eswatini Stock Exchange*	Mbabane	1990	10	ESE	
Ethiopia	Ethiopian Securities Exchange	Addis Ababa	2025	1	ESX	
Ethiopia	Ethiopia Commodity Exchange	Addis Ababa	2008		ECX	
Cameroon	Bourse des Valeurs Mobilières de l'Afrique Centrale	Duala	2003	7	BVMAC	
Ghana	Ghana Stock Exchange*	Accra	1990	49	GSE	InfoTech Capizar
Ivory Coast	Bourse Régionale des Valeurs Mobilières*	Abidjan	1998	45	BRVM	
Kenya	Nairobi Securities Exchange*	Nairobi	1954	162	NSE	
Lesotho	Maseru Securities Market*	Maseru	2016	1	MSM	
Libya	Libyan Stock Market*	Tripoli	2007		LSM	
Malawi	Malawi Stock Exchange*	Blantyre	1995	16	MSE	InfoTech Capizar
Mauritius	Stock Exchange of Mauritius	Port Louis	1988	185	SEM	Millenium Information Technology
Morocco	Casablanca Stock Exchange*	Casablanca	1929	94	CSE	
Mozambique	Bolsa de Valores de Moçambique*	Maputo	1999	11	BVM	
Namibia	Namibian Stock Exchange*	Windhoek	1992	53	NSX	
Nigeria	Nigeria Commodity Exchange	Abuja	1998		NCX	
Nigeria	NASD OTC Securities Exchange	Lagos	1998	26	NASD	
Nigeria	Nigerian Exchange Group	Lagos	1960	328	NGX	Nasdaq
Rwanda	Rwanda Stock Exchange	Kigali	2011	10	RSE	InfoTech Capizar
Rwanda	East Africa Exchange	Kigali	2014		EAX	
Seychelles	Merj Exchange Limited	Victoria	2012	48	MERJ	
Somalia	Somali Stock Exchange	Mogadishu	2015	10	SSE	
South Africa	JSE Limited*	Johannesburg	1887	442	JSE	
South Africa	A2X Markets*	Johannesburg	2017	176	A2X	
South Africa	The Integrated Exchange	Johannesburg	2017	16	I-se	
South Africa	Cape Town Stock Exchange*	Cape Town	2017 (2021)	12	CTSE	
Sudan	Khartoum Stock Exchange*	Khartoum	1994		KSE	
Tanzania	Dar es Salaam Stock Exchange*	Dar es Salaam	1998	29	DSE	
Tunisia	Bourse de Tunis*	Tunis	1969	74	BVMT	
Uganda	Uganda Securities Exchange*	Kampala	1997	20	USE	
Uganda	ALTX East Africa Exchange	Kampala	2013	3	ALTX	
Zambia	Lusaka Stock Exchange*	Lusaka	1994	22	LuSE	
Zimbabwe	Zimbabwe Stock Exchange*	Harare	1948	45	ZSE	InfoTech Capizar
Zimbabwe	Victoria Falls Stock Exchange	Victoria Falls	2020	15	VFEX	InfoTech Capizar

=== Defunct stocks ===
Economy	Exchange	Location	Founded	Defunct	Listings	Link
Egypt	Alexandria Stock Exchange	Alexandria	1888	1961		
Ivory Coast	Bourse des Valeurs d'Abidjan	Abidjan	1974	1997		
Rwanda	Rwanda Over The Counter Exchange	Kigali	2008	2011	3	
Cameroon	Douala Stock Exchange*	Douala	2001	2019	2	DSX

== See also ==
- Central banks and currencies of Africa
- Economy of Africa
- List of stock exchanges
- Stock exchanges of small economies
