= Linus Gitahi =

Linus Wang'ombe Gìtahi (born 1964) is a Kenyan businessman and executive. He served as the managing director of GlaxoSmithKline Consumer Nigeria Plc, and the Group Chief Executive Officer of Nation Media Group (November 2006 – July 2015). He currently serves as the Chairman of the Boards of Home Afrika, Diamond Trust Bank Group, AIB Capital Ltd, Oxygene Communications Limited, and Tropikal Brands (Afrika) Limited. He is a member of the boards of Simba Corp, Brand Kenya Board, Property Development & Management Ltd, International Press Institute, African Media Initiative, and Allianz Insurance Co. of Kenya Ltd. He is the founder of Baraka Foundation.

== Career ==
After graduating from the University of Nairobi, Linus Gìtahi joined Pricewaterhouse Coopers for 8 months, before joining an advertising firm and then GlaxoSmithKline in 1989, where he spent 17 years. In that time, he rose from product manager to CEO-West Africa. Linus Gìtahi succeeded Wilfred Kiboro as CEO of Nation Media Group in November 2006, and opted for early retirement in 2015. He was succeeded by former East African Breweries Managing Director Joe Muganda.
