= Nigeria Commodity Exchange =

Stock exchange in Abuja, Nigeria

The Nigeria Commodity Exchange (NCX) is (besides the Nigerian Stock Exchange) one of two principal stock exchanges in Nigeria. It was originally named the Abuja Securities and Commodities Exchange (ASCE) but was rebranded to its current name in 2011. It is located in Abuja, the country's capital, and it was originally founded in 1998.

Logo of Nigeria commodity exchange ncx

== History ==
The company first started its electrotrading services in 2001.

== Commodities ==
The NCX is primarily involved with the trading of commodities such as maize, sorghum and millet, as opposed to trading in securities such as bonds and company stock.

The Nigeria Commodity Exchange has concluded plans to set up a market information system for 12 commodity markets in the country. The managing director, NCX, Mrs. Zaheera Babaari said that within the next few months, the market information systems for the 12 major markets would be replicated in the 36 states and this would enable people get information about commodities prices as well as production of agricultural produce.

== See also ==
- Economy of Nigeria
- List of African stock exchanges
