= Limuru Tea Plc =

Tea farming company in Kenya

- Type: Public
- Traded as: KN: LIMR
- Industry: Agriculture
- Headquarters: Limuru, Kenya
- Products: Tea
- Revenue: ▼KSh.104 million/= (2023)
- Parent: LOLC Holdings through BEAP
- Website: www.limuruteaplc.com

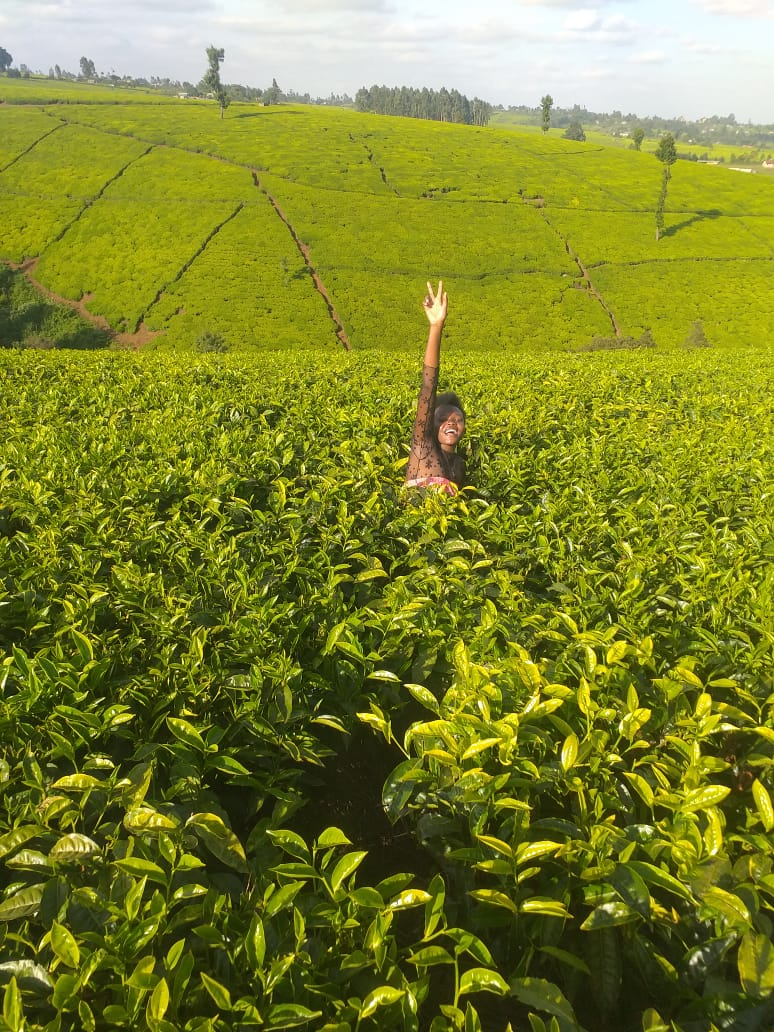
Limuru tea farming

The Limuru Tea Plc is a Kenyan company that is listed on the Nairobi Stock Exchange and engages in the growing of green leaf tea. The Company owns 282 hectares of tea land situated four kilometers to the east of Limuru Town.

The Limuru Tea Plc is an out-grower to Browns East Africa Plantations Plc (BEAP), formally ekaterra Tea Kenya PLC (eTK) and Unilever Tea Kenya Limited (UTKL) before that. BEAP holds 52% of the issued share capital of Limuru Tea and acts as the company's managing agent in the growing, manufacturing, sales and marketing of its teas. The Limuru Tea estate green leaf is manufactured in the nearby BEAP's Mabroukie factory from where it is sold mainly for export.

== Ownership ==
The shares of Limuru Tea Plc are publicly listed and traded on the Nairobi Securities Exchange, under the symbol: LIMT. As of 31 December 2024, the shareholding in the company's stock, was as depicted in the table below:

Limuru Tea Plc Stock Ownership
Rank	Name of Owner	Per centage Ownership
1	Browns East Africa Plantations Plc^{1} of Kenya	51.99
2	Other Local & International Investors	48.01
	Total	100.00

== See also ==
- Nairobi Stock Exchange
- Lipton Teas and Infusions
