= Bolsa de Valores de Cabo Verde =

Stock exchange in Achada Santo António, Cape Verde

Cape Verde Stock Exchange
- Bolsa de Valores de Cabo Verde
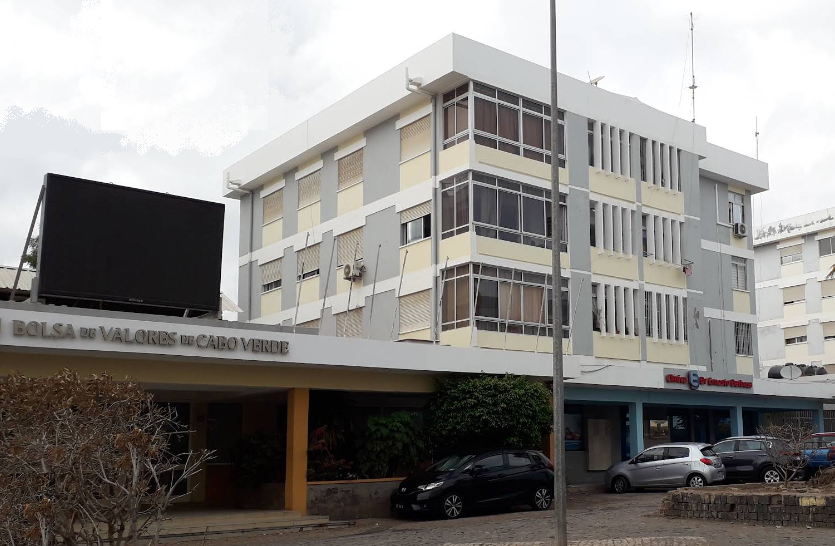
- Location: Praia, Cape Verde
- No. of listings: 4
- Website: bvc.cv

The Bolsa de Valores de Cabo Verde (Cape Verde Stock Exchange) is the stock exchange of Cape Verde. It is located in the Achada Santo António district of Praia. The Cape Verde Stock Exchange (BVC) was established on May 11, 1998 by governmental decision. At the end of 2017, the market capitalisation was 68.4 billion escudos, which equals 621 million euro.

The operating structure of the Cape Verde stock exchange combines the auctioning system with quote-driven systems in order to support larger market liquidity. The market deployed huge efforts to restructure itself in line with the best practices and most relevant international guidelines. All platforms are credible ones and some are used by Euronext Lisbon and Interbolsa.

The BVC is a member of the African Securities Exchanges Association.

== See also ==
- Economy of Cape Verde
- List of African stock exchanges
- List of stock exchanges
