= ALTX East Africa Exchange =

Stock exchange in Kampala, Uganda

- Type: Stock Exchange
- Location: Kampala, Uganda
- Founded: March 2014
- Key people: Joseph Kitamirike chief executive officer
- Currency: Ugandan shilling
- Website: www.altxafrica.com

The ALTX East Africa Exchange (ALTX) is a stock exchange in Uganda. The ALTX operates under the jurisdiction of Uganda's Capital Markets Authority, which in turn reports to the Government of Uganda.

== Trading ==
Its operations are entirely electronic, with all transactions completed online. The exchange lists foreign securities, bonds, and exchange traded funds. The exchange opened to trading on 13 July 2016. It accepts trades as low as US$3, targeting investors of modest means.

ALTX East Africa Exchange expanded its operations to Uganda after obtaining a regulatory approval in 2014, and depository approval in 2015.

== Ownership ==
ALTX is a demutualised exchange wholly owned by ALTX Africa Group, a Mauritius based entity that also owns ALTX Clearing. GMEX Technologies of the United Kingdom owns 25 percent of ALTX Africa Group. Other investors include Joseph Kitamirike, the chief executive officer and co-founder of ALTX East Africa, and Jatin Jivram, director and co-founder of ALTX East Africa.

== See also ==
- Economy of Uganda
- List of African stock exchanges
- Uganda Securities Exchange
- Ugandan shilling
- List of stock exchanges in the Commonwealth of Nations
