= MTN Rwanda =

Rwandan telecommunications company

Coordinates: 01°56′27″S 30°06′13″E

- Type: Public: RSE: MTN
- Industry: Telecommunications
- Founded: 1998; 28 years ago
- Headquarters: MTN Center; Nyarutarama; Kigali, Rwanda
- Key people: Faustin Mbundu, chairperson Monzer Ali, CEO
- Services: Telecommunications; Information technology; Carrier
- Website: Homepage

MTN Rwandacell Plc, commonly referred to as MTN Rwanda, is the largest telecommunications company in Rwanda, with an estimated 7 million subscribers, accounting for 62 percent market share, as of 30 July 2023.

== History ==
MTN Rwanda was established in 1998 during the reconstruction of the Rwanda economy in the aftermath of the 1994 genocide against the Tutsi.

It is a subsidiary of MTN Group, a multinational telecommunications group connecting about 232 million people in 22 countries across Africa and the Middle East, as of 2016.

In May 2021, the shares of stock of MTN Rwanda were listed on the Rwanda Stock Exchange. This impelled the closure of Crystal Telecom Rwanda, owned by the Rwandese Patriotic Front (RPF), the party of Paul Kagame which had been a vehicle for the "public" to own shares in MTN.

As of 31 December 2022, the shareholding of the stock of MTN Rwanda was as illustrated in the table below.

MTN Rwanda Plc stock ownership
Rank	Name of owner	Percentage ownership	Notes
1	MTN International (Mauritius) Limited	55.0	
2	MTN REL (Mauritius) Limited	25.0	
3	Retail investors	20.0	
	Total	100.00	

In 2023, the company marked its 25th year of existence by planting 25,000 trees in Nyarugenge District, as part of the parent MTN Group's ambition to achieve carbon neutrality by 2040.

== Governance ==
As of February 2022, the chairman of MTN Rwanda was Faustin K. Mbundu, an independent, non-executive director. The CEO/managing director, as of January 2024, is Mapula Bodibe.

== Fintech ==
=== Mobile Money (MoMo) ===
MTN Rwanda introduced mobile money services to the country in February 2010, initially as a value-added service under the telecom license.

In April 2021, the company restructured this division into a standalone subsidiary, Mobile Money Rwanda Ltd, to comply with National Bank of Rwanda regulations requiring the separation of digital financial services from core telecommunications operations.

- User base: As of September 2025, the service had 5.8 million active users.
- Merchant payments: The MoMoPay merchant network expanded to 577,000 active merchants by late 2025, establishing it as the primary cashless payment method in the country.
- Transaction volume: In the 2024 financial year, the platform processed 1.9 billion transactions. The total value of these transactions surged to Rwf 21.0 trillion (approx. US$15.4 billion).
- EconomicsScale: The total value of money circulated on the MTN platform in 2024 (Rwf 21.0 trillion) exceeded Rwanda's nominal GDP for the same year (Rwf 18.8 trillion), highlighting the system's role as the primary engine of monetary velocity in the economy.

== Location ==
The headquarters of MTN Rwandacell Plc are located at MTN Centre, Nyarutarama, Kigali, Rwanda. This location is in one of the upscale suburbs of the city of Kigali, the national capital. The geographical coordinates of the headquarters of MTN Rwanda are 1°56'27.0"S 30°06'13.0"E (Latitude:-1.940833; Longitude:30.103611).

== See also ==
- List of mobile network operators in Rwanda
