= Rea Vipingo =

- Type: Public
- Traded as: KN: REA
- Industry: Agriculture
- Founded: 1939
- Headquarters: Nairobi, Kenya
- Key people: Neil Cuthbert; Group Executive Director; Oliver Fowler; Chairman; Richard Robinow; Director
- Products: Sisal
- Revenue: ▼KES: 2.570 Billion (2013)
- Total assets: ▲KES: 1.757 Billion (2013)
- Website: Homepage

Rea Vipingo is a company that operates sisal plantations in Kenya and Tanzania. The company's headquarters are located in Nairobi. Its stock was listed between 1996, and 2015 on the Nairobi Stock Exchange.

It deals with the cultivation of agave in its plantations in Kenya (in Kwibezi and Vipingo) and, through the subsidiary Amboni Plantations Limited, in Tanzania and with the marketing of both the sisal fiber obtained from it, of the products (yarn, twine, rope) made with the fiber in the Amboni Spinning Mill production plant, owned by the company and which is located near the city of Tanga, in Tanzania.

== See also ==
- Nairobi Stock Exchange
- Centum Investment Company Limited
