= Angola Debt and Stock Exchange =

Coordinates: 8.813193829557857°S 13.242045740867903°E

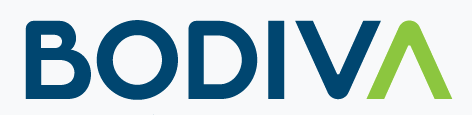
- Type: Public
- Location: Marechal Brós Tito street, 41, Sky Business Tower, Luanda, Angola
- Founded: 7 May 2014
- Owner: Government of Angola; Public
- Key people: Antônio Henriques da Silva (Chairman); António Furtado (CEO)
- Currency: Kwanza
- No. of listings: 14
- Website: Stock Exchange Website

The Angola Debt and Stock Exchange (Bodiva; in portuguese: Bolsa de Dívida e Valores de Angola) is a stock exchange in Angola, which is based in Luanda. First announced in 2006, the Stock Exchange was hoping to open during the first quarter of the 2008 fiscal year, though in August 2008 Aguinaldo Jaime said that the launch would be "a task for the next government... maybe late 2008 or the beginning of 2009".

Due in part to the effects of the credit crunch, the earlier intention for the Angola Stock Exchange to open in early 2009 has been further delayed, with current indications that it was scheduled to open in 2010, with the intention to list 10 companies.

However in July 2013, Archer Mangueira, chairman of the Capital Markets Commission of Angola, said that Angola plans to start the Angola Stock Exchange trading on 2016.

On December 19, 2014, the Capital Market in Angola started. BODIVA (Angola Securities and Debt Stock Exchange, in English) received the secondary public debt market, and it is expected to start the corporate debt market by 2015, but the stock market should only be a reality in 2016.

Walter Pacheco resigned as Chairman of the executive committee of BODIVA in February 2025 after almost four years in office. He was replaced on a temporary basis by Cristina Lourenço who was the longest serving member of the executive committee. Unfortunately this was controversial as Cristina was the daughter of the Angolan President, João Lourenço.

Lourenço was then appointed CEO of BODIVA for a four-year term that ends in 2028.

== See also ==
- List of African stock exchanges
- Stock exchanges of small economies
