= Cape Town Stock Exchange =

South African stock exchange

- Type: Stock exchange
- Currency: Rand
- No. of listings: 12
- Website: ctexchange.co.za

The Cape Town Stock Exchange (CTSE) is a stock exchange based in Cape Town, South Africa. It is the second largest stock exchange in South Africa, after the Johannesburg Stock Exchange (JSE), and the only one other than the JSE that is authorized to trade in both equity and debt.

== Background ==
The CTSE was launched in 2016, with operations beginning in 2017. It was formed from a rebranding of the 4 Africa Exchange (4AX) in response to the high costs and extensive requirements of listing a company on the Johannesburg Stock Exchange.

The exchange is geared toward small and medium-sized companies with a market capitalization between 25 million and 2 billion rand.

== See also ==
- List of African stock exchanges
- A2X Markets
