= Bolsa de Valores de la República Dominicana =

Stock Market of the Dominican Republic

- Type: Privately held
- Industry: Securities exchange
- Headquarters: Santo Domingo, Dominican Republic
- Key people: Marino Ginebra (President)
- Number of employees: unknown
- Website: www.bolsard.com

Bolsa de Valores de la República Dominicana (Stock Market of the Dominican Republic, BVRD) is the only stock exchange in the Dominican Republic, basically performing a transaction regulation function. It began operations in 1991 and is viewed as a cornerstone of the country's integration into the global economy and domestic development. It is also one of the most active stock exchanges in Latin America. The BVRD operates Monday through Friday from 9:00 a.m. to 1:00 p.m.

== History ==
During April 1980, a group of Dominican industrialists began to meet with the intention of formalizing a stock market and creating a regulating body guarded by the transparency and the efficiency of the operations in this market. This group consisted of Ricardo Valdéz Albízu, Hector Rizek, Ramón Mena, Winston Marrero, Otto Montero, Frederic Eman-Zadé, Luis Sabater and Rosendo Alvarez III. During 1987 this original group contacted, Robert Bishop, the former vice-president of the New York Stock Exchange, to assist with the markets creation. The Dominican Republic's first stock exchange finally came into legal existence under Presidential Decree No. 554-89 that was passed on February 20, 1989, but actually did not begin formal operations until December 1991. It was originally known as the Bolsa de Valores de Santo Domingo Inc. In 1997, as a result of the fact that its activities extended into other cities of the country, it changed its name to Bolsa de Valores de la República Dominicana. This means that the market is still relatively new, and the concept of both an equity and capital market is just coming into consciousness. Despite the limitations resulting from inadequate legislation, transactions at the BVRD grew steadily during the 1990s.

== Structure ==
There are twenty brokerage houses registered at the BVRD. Thirteen belong to financial groups and only seven are operative and belong to banking institutions. Almost 75 percent of the securities transactions are cross transactions in which both the buyer and the seller are clients of the same brokerage house. In recent years various laws were approved in an attempt to give new life to the Dominican securities market. In 2000, the Securities Market Law (SML), Law 19-00, was enacted, creating the Superintendence of Securities (Superintendencia de Valores, SIV) as the regulatory agency of the securities market. There are 24 securities brokers and there are no registered securities agents. There is one commodities exchange in the country, the Bolsa Agroempresarial de la Republica Dominicana, S.A., which has 14 registered brokerage houses.

Since many companies do not wish to sell shares to the public (this is a common theme among family owned Latin-American companies), the majority of activity has been in the capital and fixed income markets. The primary activities of the exchange involve public sale of commercial paper and bond instruments.

== Performance ==
From 1991 to 2001, transactions for a total of RD 62, 885.6 million have been executed at the BVRD. Of this total, 99.96 percent corresponds to commercial paper trades. On the other hand, 75 percent of this aggregated amount was traded from 1999 to 2001. Volumes negotiated at the BVRD reached record levels in the year 2001, going from RD 4,041.7 million in 2000 to RD 22,680.6 million in 2001, an increase of 461.2 percent. In the year 2002, the BVRD made operations for RD 24,841.9 million, for an increase of 9.52 percent. The average interest rate was 18.9 percent. As of October 2003 the volume of transactions of the Santo Domingo Stock Market was RD 16,129,021,469.69 and the average rate was 24.42 percent.

As of 2009, BVRD is headed by President Marcos Troncoso.

== Members of the BVRD ==
The members of the BVRD include:

- Alpha Sociedad de Valores, S. A.
- Atlantico BBA Valores Puesto de Bolsa, S.A
- BHD LEON Puesto de Bolsa
- CCI, S. A., Puesto de Bolsa
- Citinversiones de Titulos y Valores, S.A.
- Excel Puesto de Bolsa, S.A.
- Inversiones & Reservas, S.A., Puesto de Bolsa
- Inversiones Popular, S.A., Puesto de Bolsa
- Inversiones Santa Cruz S.A.
- JMMB Puesto de Bolsa, S. A.
- Parallax Valores, S. A., Puesto de Bolsa
- Plus Capital Market Dominicana-PCM Dominicana
- Primma Valores, S.A., Puesto de Bolsa
- Titulos y Valores, S. A., Puesto de Bolsa
- United Capital, S. A., Puesto de Bolsa
- Vertex Valores Puesto de Bolsa, S. A.

Companies of the most trading activity from 1991 to 2005 included:

Rank	Company - Entity	Volume	Participation
1	Leasing Popular, S.A.	22,272,502,546.48	49.87%
2	Factoring Popular, S.A.	5,927,218,929.46	13.27%.
3	Immobiliaria BHD, S.A.	2,691,948,537.10	6.03%
4	Avelino Abreu, C por A	1,224,227,289.53	2.74%
5	Servinvest	1,149,697,390.49	2.57%
6	Curaçao Trading Co.	1,005,614,948.04	2.25%
