= Khartoum Stock Exchange =

Stock exchange in Khartoum, Sudan

Khartoum Stock Exchange سوق الخرطوم للأوراق المالية
- KSE
- Type: Stock Exchange
- Location: Khartoum, Sudan
- Currency: Sudanese pound
- Website: www.kse.com.sd

The Khartoum Stock Exchange (KSE) is the principal stock exchange of Sudan. It is located in Khartoum. The principal stock index of the KSE is the Khartoum Index.

While the KSE has been growing rapidly over the last few years and has 53 listed companies worth around 5 billion dollars, the stock exchange is open only one hour per day, Sunday through Thursday.

== History ==
The idea of KSE started in 1962 by Ministry of finance, bank of Sudan and International Finance Corporation (IFC). On 1964 a department for government bonds was established within the Bank of Sudan for issuing bonds. In 1966 the first government bonds were issued with a par value of £S.15 million and ten years life. The 1982 Act to establish KSE did not succeed. However, a serious step was taken in 1992 to establish KSE which led to the formation of KSE’s board. It was in 1994 that KSE gained its independent legal entity after the endorsement of KSE Act. In 1994 the primary market activities started and the secondary market stated early in 1995. The classifications of listed companies began in 1999. In 2001 Shahama certificates were introduced in KSE. Khartoum index was declared in 2003. In 2007, KSE joined Africa Market Union.

== See also ==
- Economy of Sudan
- List of African stock exchanges
- List of Mideast stock exchanges
- List of stock exchanges
