= Yeroo =

- Type: Weeklynewspaper
- Format: Broadsheet
- Owner: Jimma Times
- Headquarters: Addis Ababa Jimma Ethiopia
- Website: Yeroo.Org

Yeroo was the first private Afaan Oromo newspaper published in Qubee (Oromo alphabet). It distributed weekly newspapers mainly around the cities and towns of the Oromia region of Ethiopia. Alongside another independent newspaper URJII, Yeroo was the last private Oromo press closed down due to media restrictions in Ethiopia. Due to being independent, the media faced difficulties from the Ethiopian government since its beginning during its registration and establishment. A few weeks after its publications, security problems and financial restrictions imposed by the government caused the newspaper to be suspended. Its website version is Jimma Times (JT), which has remained online after Yeroo newspaper was closed. JT has been the first media to break several news stories before other media outlets, including the story of former Ethiopian PM Tamrat Layne, who became "born again" and left politics, the acceptance of Ethiopian Airlines into the Star Alliance as well as on the decision of the top opposition party Medrek to seek a re-run of disputed Election 2010. Various international media have used news content from Yeroo's Jimma Times, including United Press International (UPI), Epoch Times and Voice of America (VOA) radio. The Jimma Times has also been quoted by and its content used by many Ethiopian newspapers and sites including Capital Ethiopia, Addis Neger, Gadaa.com, Opride.com, Ethio Channel, Awramba Times and African Monitor. Its website/online version has also been suspended for many years after it faced frequent blockage from the government that often censors online media.

== Recent ==
Post-2018 after Oromo protests led to the end of TPLF-led government and the rise of a new administration led by a regional Oromia party, Yeroo media relaunched operations, according to its website.

However, a Yahoo! News article in September 2020 reported that the Yeroo newspaper continued to face operational challenges from both extremist groups and government security, including one of its journalist getting arrested.

== See also ==
- Addis Fortune
- Oromia
- Oromo people
