= Sierra Leone Stock Exchange =

Stock exchange in Sierra Leone

- Type: Stock exchange
- Location: Freetown, Sierra Leone
- Founded: 2009
- Owner: Publicly owned company
- No. of listings: 3 (2023)
- Market cap: US$30 million (2023)
- Website: slssec.com

The Sierra Leone Stock Exchange (SLSE) is the stock exchange of Sierra Leone.

== History ==
The Sierra Leone Stock Exchange was established on July 17, 2009. At its inception, the SLSE listed only one share of the state-owned Rokel Commercial Bank.The establishment of the stock exchange was the result of a privatization program that had been implemented in the country some time before. In 2017, the SLSE was reorganized. At that time, the National Social Security and Insurance Trust (NASSIT) expressed interest in trading shares of Golden Tulip and Radisson Blu on the SLSE. HFC Mortgage and Services and Sierra Leone Commercial Bank also expressed interest. In the same year, all securities trading in Sierra Leone was legally reorganized by The Securities and Exchange Commission Act, 2017.

Contrary to the common trend for African stock exchanges in recent years of an increase in listings and the success of stock exchanges, the SLSE remained illiquid, with low trading volumes and few companies or traders participating in the market. Foreign investors are not allowed (as of 2022). In 2023, only three companies were listed with a market capitalization of US$ 30 million.
