= Home Afrika =

Real estate company in Kenya

Home Afrika Limited
- Type: Public company KN: HAFR
- Industry: Real estate
- Founded: 2008; 18 years ago
- Headquarters: Morningside Office Park; Nairobi, Kenya
- Key people: Linus Gitahi; Chairman; Dan Awendo; CEO
- Revenue: ▲KES 100 Million (2018)
- Total assets: ▲KES 3.065 Billion (2013)
- Website: Homepage

Home Afrika is a leading real estate company based in Nairobi, Kenya. Its name is abbreviated to HAFR. Home Afrika is listed on the Nairobi Stock Exchange (NSE) under the 'Growth Enterprise Market Segment' (GEMS). Home Afrika engages in the development and sale of real estate properties.

== Overview ==
Home Afrika started as an investment club in July 2008 before steadily growing to become a public company worth well over US$100 million as of 15 July 2013 when it listed on the NSE. The company was the first to list in the GEMS section of the NSE.

The company's developments include Morningside Office Park in Nairobi; Migaa, a live-in-golf community in Kiambu County; Lakeview Heights in Kisumu County; Llango in Kwale County; and Kikwetu in Machakos County.

== Member companies ==
The companies that comprise the Home Afrika include, but are not limited, to the following:

- Suburban Limited – Kenya – 50% Shareholding – Real estate development
- Mitini Scapes Development Limited – 100% Shareholding – Real Estate Development
- Lakeview Heights Development Limited – 100% Shareholding – Real Estate Development
- Lango Development Limited – 100% Shareholding – Real Estate Development
- Kikwetu Limited – 100% Shareholding – Real Estate Development
- Home Afrika Communities Limited – Kenya – 60% Shareholding – Real Estate Development
- Migaa Management Limited – Kenya – 52% Shareholding – Real Estate Development

== Ownership ==
Home Afrika with its subsidiaries, which it owns, either wholly or partially, form the Home Afrika Group. The stock of the group is traded on the Nairobi Stock Exchange (NSE), under the symbol: HAFR.

== Governance ==
Home Afrika is governed by an eleven-person Board of Directors with Lee Karuri serving as the chairman and Dan Awendo as the CEO.
