= Eleni Gabre-Madhin =

Ethiopian economist

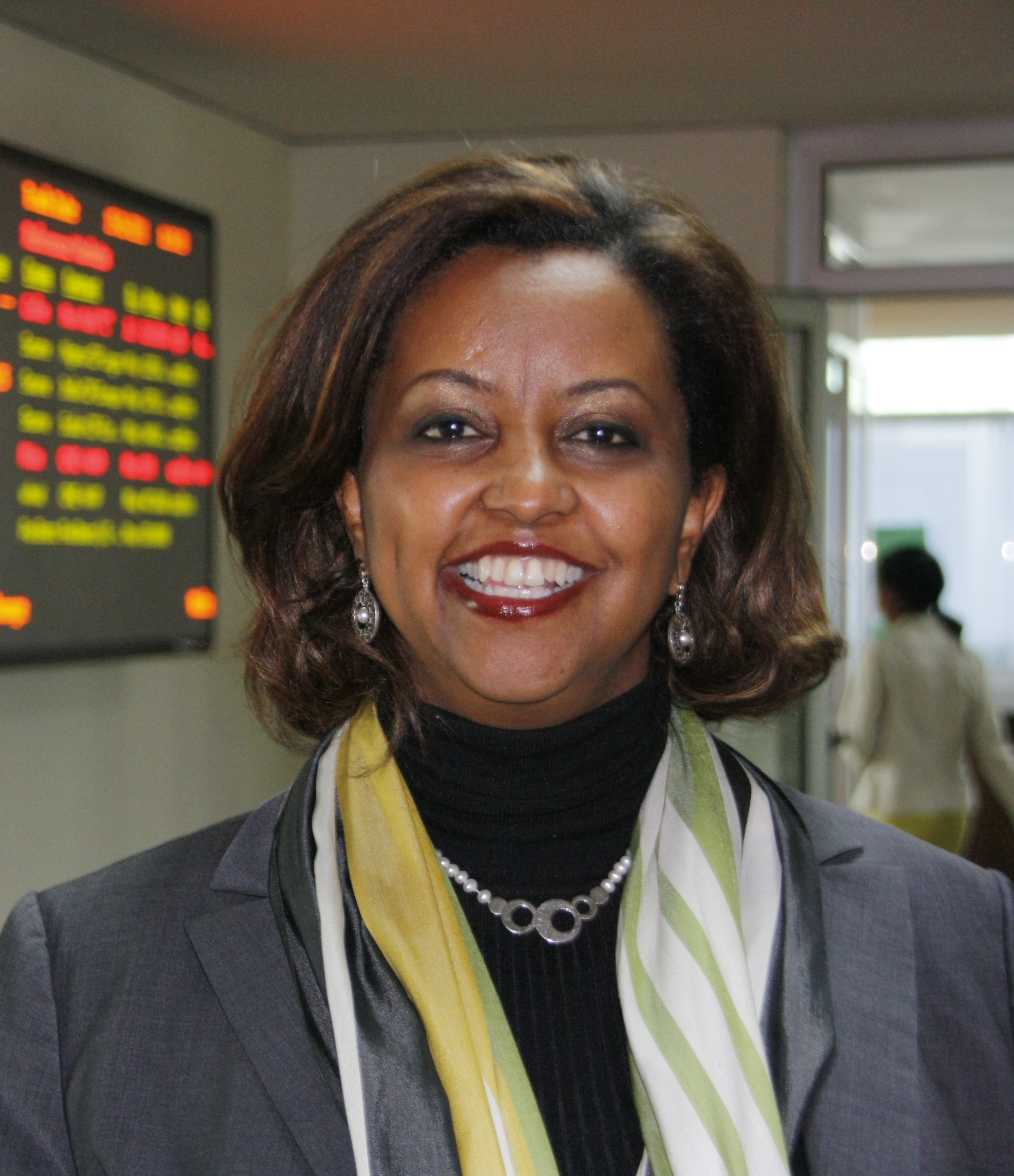
- Born: Addis Ababa, Ethiopia
- Education: Stanford University; Michigan State University; Cornell University
- Occupation: Economist

Eleni Zaude Gabre-Madhin is an Ethiopian economist, and former chief executive officer of the Ethiopia Commodity Exchange (ECX). She has had many years of experience working on agricultural markets – particularly in Sub-Saharan Africa – and has held senior positions in the World Bank, the International Food Policy Research Institute (Washington, D.C.), and United Nations (Geneva and New York City).

== Early life ==
Eleni was born in Addis Ababa, Ethiopia. Her upbringing was diverse, growing up in New York City, Rwanda, and Kenya. She speaks fluent English, Amharic, French, and Swahili. She graduated high school from Rift Valley Academy in Kenya with the highest of honors. She earned a PhD in Applied Economics from Stanford University, a Masters in Agricultural Economics from Michigan State University and a Bachelors in Economics from Cornell University. Eleni was selected as "Ethiopian Person of the Year" for the 2002 ET calendar year (2009/2010 Gregorian) by the Ethiopian newspaper Jimma Times.

== Career ==
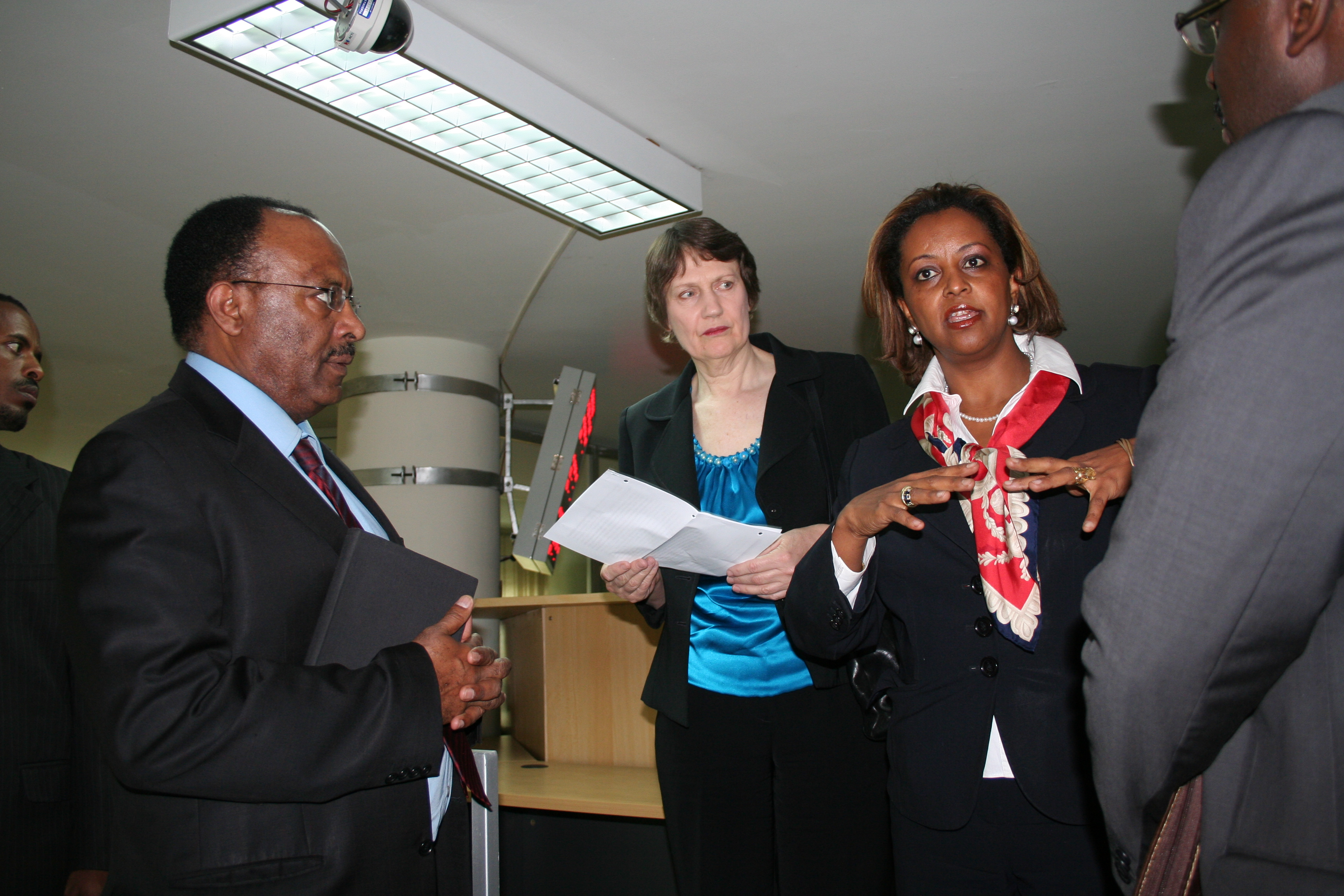
Eleni talks about the Ethiopia Commodity Exchange with Helen Clark, head of the UNDP

Dr. Eleni Gabre-Madhin was the main driving force behind the development of the Ethiopia Commodity Exchange (ECX). Whilst working as a researcher for the International Food Policy Research Institute (IFPRI) she examined agricultural markets for many years and noticed, as had many others, that whilst in some years or regions there were severe shortages or droughts in others there were surpluses or bumper harvests. Specifically in her survey of grain traders in 2002, she found that a key factor was the lack of effective infrastructure and services needed for grain markets to function properly. Traders often failed to have access to sufficient credit, information about the market, transportation and other vital resources and contract compliance was difficult to enforce. In 2004 she moved home from the US to lead an IFPRI program to improve Ethiopia's agricultural policies and markets. Specifically she undertook the important role of coordinating the advisory body developing the ECX. She became CEO of the new exchange in 2008, and argued that "(W)hen farmers can sell their crops on the open market and get a fair price, they will have much more incentive to be productive, and Ethiopia will be much less prone to food crises" .... and that the "ECX will allow farmers and traders to link to the global economy, propelling Ethiopian agriculture forward to a whole new level."

In February 2013, she became a director of Syngenta and launched eleni LLC, a company intended to build and invest in commodity exchanges in emerging markets across the world, primarily in Africa.

In 2024, she began her tenure as Executive in Residence at Georgetown University's McDonough School of Business.

== Awards ==
In 2010, Eleni was named Ethiopian Person of the Year for the 2002 Ethiopian year. Eleni was listed as one of the 50 Women Shaping Africa in 2011.

In 2012, Eleni was awarded the Africa Food Prize (formerly Yara Prize) from the Norwegian fertilizer manufacturer Yara International for her outstanding contributions to sustainable food production and distribution with socio-economic impact. That same year, she was recognized as one of New African Magazine's 100 Most Influential Africans, won the African Banker Icon Award, and invited to the G8 Summit at Camp David.

She was granted The Power with Purpose Award from Devex and McKinsey in 2016.
