= InterBolsa =

Former Portuguese financial firm

Grupo InterBolsa
- Company type: Sociedad Anónima
- Traded as: BVC: INTERBOLSA
- Industry: financial services brokerage data provider
- Founded: 1990; 36 years ago
- Headquarters: Bogotá, Colombia; Medellín, Colombia
- Key people: Rodrigo Jaramillo Correa, (Chairman)
- Divisions: Comisionista De Bolsa; Interbolsa Panama; Finabank
- Website: www.interbolsa.com

InterBolsa (BVC: INTERBOLSA) formerly the Interbolsa Financial Group now largely known as Grupo InterBolsa, was a Colombian based securities broker (largest in Colombia) and proprietary trader that also engaged in asset management and other types of investment banking. It operated until November 2012, when the Colombian Government ordered its closure due to a default of debts with the local banking system. The group still has other investments and companies overseas whose operations may not be interrupted by this closure.

The company had over 29% of the market volume of brokerage activity in Colombia.

== History ==
Until 2008, it operated as a loosely integrated conglomerate with a controlling interest in a number of smaller companies, each specializing in a different region (Panama) or product (InterBolsa Futures). In 2009, after it made a move into the Brazilian market when it acquired all of Finabank for US$21 million it officially organized itself into a holding company called Grupo InterBolsa.

== Subsidiaries ==
Interbolsa Comisionista de Bolsa

Administradora de Inversión – Asset Manager that oversees Colombia's first private capital energy fund; InterBolsa Energético which was established in April 2009.

Interbolsa Panama

Finabank – Brazilian securities broker 90% owned by InterBolsa. Has repo operations.

Fundación InterBolsa – organizes corporate responsibility programs for the group of companies.
