= Crystal Ventures =

Rwandan holding company

Coordinates: 1°56′47.2″S 30°3′37.4″E

Crystal Ventures Limited (CVL)
- Type: Private company
- Industry: Conglomerate holding
- Predecessor: Tri-Star Investments, 1995
- Founded: January 1, 1995; 31 years ago
- Headquarters: Kigali, Rwanda
- Area served: Rwanda
- Key people: Jack N. Kayonga; Chief Executive Officer
- Products: fast moving consumable goods, construction materials
- Services: engineering, security services
- Revenue: ▲Aftertax:RWF:
- Total assets: RWF:
- Number of employees: 12,000 (2017)
- Website: www.cvl.co.rw

Crystal Ventures Limited (CVL), commonly referred to as Crystal Ventures, is a private holding company owned by the Rwandan presidential party, Rwandese Patriotic Front. It was founded in 1995 after the Rwandan genocide and renamed in 2009. It is headquartered in Kigali, Rwanda and invests in engineering, fast moving consumable goods, construction, construction materials and security services. As of 2017 it was the second largest employer in Rwanda behind the state, with an estimated capital of $500 million.

== History ==
Crystal Ventures was formed as Tri-Star Investments in 1995, after the Rwandan genocide, taking advantage of a "virgin environment" in the words of the firm. It was renamed in 2009 into Crystal Ventures.

As of 2025, it is a private holding company for the following companies:

- Inyange industries, which has been producing fruit products, fruit juice, and dairy related products since 1997 and mineral water since 2001.
- NPD COTRACO Ltd, result of a merger between a Kigali based property developer of housing estates since 1996 named Nyarutarama Property Developers (NPD), and COTRACO, maker of prefabricated concrete products.
- Real Contractors Ltd, a construction company since 2005
- ISCO, a security service since 1995, also providing cash transportation and since 2022 training more than 1000 security officers per year.
- East African Granite Industries Ltd since 2012, located in eastern Rwanda's Nyagatare District
- Macefield Vetures in 2021, controls or is a shareholder in 16 companies in mining, agriculture and infrastructure (Vogueroc, created in 2021, mines gold and diamonds) in at least six countries: the Central African Republic, Mozambique, Zambia, Zimbabwe, Congo-Brazzaville and the DRC, In the Central African Republic and Mozambique Paul Kagame had been deploying his army, by 2023 already.

In the DRC, however mining projects were abandoned after relations between Paul Kagame and Felix Tshisekedi broke down. As of 2025 Macefield Ventures Congo Holding is not listed on the CVL website, even though it has links to TotalEnergies natural gas project on the Afungi Peninsula and signed an agreement with the ROC to purchase 12,000 hectares of land from the ROC.

Critics in 2023 maintained that, as the second largest employer in the Rwanda behind the state, with an estimated capital of $500 million, the company was able to stifle competition and prevent the private sector from experiencing a boom. The World Bank criticised CVL's quasi-monopoly on certain sectors.

Arte TV described CVL´s investing abroad in a 2024 documentary as military diplomacy.

== Governance ==
Crystal Ventures, has been described as an "investment fund and financial arm of the Rwandese Patriotic Front (RPF), with Paul Kagame as the de facto boss". As of 2023 its functioning was still described as secretive. While in 2025, the company´s website declared a team of 13 officers and directors respectively, 4 of them women, it did not offer any annual reports, employment or financial figures. The table below illustrates the members in 2025 and 2026.

Composition of the Board of Crystal Ventures Limited
Position	Board Member 2025	Board member 226
Chairman	Jean-Claude Karayenzi	Jean-Claude Karayenzi
Chief Executive Officer	Jack N. Kayonga	-not mentioned
Chief operating officer	Yves Bernard Ningabire	Yves Bernard Ningabire
Chief Investment Officer	Iza Irame	Iza Irame
Chief financial officer	Theogene Maniragaba	Theogene Maniragaba
Chief Audit & Risk Officer	Chantal Habiyakare	-not mentioned
Group General Counsel	Dennis Kaberuka	Dennis Kaberuka
HR & Administration Director	Ines Kayitesi	Ines Kayitesi
Senior Compliance Director CFO	Mark Murenzi Rukata	Mark Murenzi Rukata
IT Director	Vlady Terimbere	Vlady Terimbere
Strategy Director	Rachel Iriza	Rachel Iriza
Tax Director	Simon Pierre Bimenyimana	Simon Pierre Bimenyimana
Investment Director	Captain Rusera	-not mentioned
	Total	13

== Location ==
Crystal Ventures maintains its headquarters at Grand Pension Plaza, on the 14th Floor, at 2 KN 3 Avenue, in Kigali, Rwanda's capital and largest city. The geographical coordinates of the company's headquarters are:01°56'47.2"S, 30°03'37.4"E (Latitude:-1.946444; Longitude:30.060389).

== See also ==
- MTN Group
