= Carbacid Investments =

Kenyan manufacturing and investment company

Carbacid Investments Limited
- Type: Public company:NSE:CARB
- Industry: Carbon dioxide manufacturing
- Founded: 1961
- Headquarters: Nairobi, Kenya
- Key people: Amb.Dennis Awori Chairman
- Products: Food grade Liquid CO_{2}, Compressed CO_{2}, Medical CO_{2}, Dry Ice, Cylinder Testing & Validation
- Revenue: Aftertax: KSh.375.56 million/= (US$3.75 million) (2016)
- Total assets: KSh.3.081 billion/= (US$30.81 million) (2016)
- Website: Homepage

Carbacid Investments plc, is a manufacturing and investment company in Kenya, the largest economy in the East African Community. The company manufactures and markets carbon dioxide gas for food processing, industrial use and medical use, as well as dry ice. It also tests and validates gas cylinders.

Carbacid Investments currently has a market share of above 65% in the regional carbon dioxide market. The shares of the company's stock are listed on the Nairobi Securities Exchange (NSE), where they trade under the symbol CARB.

== Overview ==
The company is the largest manufacturer of food, medical and industrial CO_{2} in the region. In the financial year that ended 31 July 2016, the company turnover was valued at KSh.831,761,000/= (approx. US$8,317,610). Net profits were at KSh.375,568,000/= (approx. US$3,755,680). The company's total assets were valued at KSh.3,081,768,000/= (approx. US$30,817,680), with shareholders' equity of KSh:2,674,198,000/= (approx. US$26,741,980).

== History ==
Carbacid Investments traces its roots to BEA Sawmills Limited, a company that was first to extract carbon dioxide from a natural underground reservoir in Kereita Forest in Kenya in 1933. Carbacid was officially incorporated in 1961 and listed at the Nairobi Securities Exchange (NSE) in 1972 following a series of acquisitions.

== Operations ==
Carbacid Investments is mainly involved in the mining, purification and distribution of carbon dioxide gas to soft drink manufacturers and to beer bottlers. The company also makes medical CO_{2} for use in hospitals and other medical facilities and laboratories including universities. Other products manufactured by Carbacid include dry ice, which is used in the preservation of cold temperatures when shipping sensitive biological and chemical material. Carbacid's distribution network extends across the whole of East Africa, serving customers in Kenya, Uganda, Tanzania, Rwanda, Burundi, Ethiopia, Eastern DRC, Zambia, South Sudan and Somalia.

== Member companies ==
The companies that comprise the Carbacid Investments Limited include, but are not limited, to the following Kenya registered subsidiaries:

1. Carbacid (CO_{2}) Limited – The flagship company of the group. Its principal activities involve the mining, purification and sale of carbon dioxide gas. This company is a 100% subsidiary of Carbacid Investments Limited.
2. Goodison Twenty Nine Limited – An investment company, wholly owned by Carbacid Investments Limited.
3. Goodison Forty Seven Limited – An investment company, wholly owned by Carbacid Investments Limited.

== Ownership ==
The shares of the Carbacid Investments Limited are listed on the NSE, where they trade under the symbol CARB. As of July 2016 the shareholding of Carbacid Investments was as follows:

Carbacid Investments Limited Stock Ownership
Rank	Name of Owner	Percentage Ownership
1	Mrs A B Patel & Mr BC Patel	30.41
2	Leverton Limited	9.36
3	Kivuli Limited	5.83
4	Miss T I Friedman	4.42
5	Standard Chartered Nominees A/C: 9230	2.27
6	Cfc Stanbic Nominees Limited A/C NR 1031010	1.68
7	Mrs B C Kampf	1.58
8	Peter Kingori Mwangi	1.09
9	Mr R B Robinson	0.95
10	Standard Chartered Nominees A/C 10881	0.86
11	Others	41.55
	Total	100.00

== See also ==
- List of wealthiest people in Kenya
- Nairobi Securities Exchange
- Economy of Kenya
