= Rwanda Stock Exchange =

Stock exchange located in Kigali, Rwanda

Coordinates: 1.943266°N 30.059500°E

- Type: Stock exchange
- Location: Kigali, Rwanda
- Founded: 31 January 2011
- Key people: Celestin Rwabukumba, CEO
- No. of listings: 10
- Website: rse.rw

Rwanda Stock Exchange Limited (RSE) was incorporated on 7 October 2005. The stock exchange was demutualized from the start, as it was registered as a company limited by shares. The company was officially launched on 31 January 2011.

== History ==
The exchange's doors opened for trading on 31 January 2011. That day coincided with the first day of trading in the stock of Rwanda's only brewery, Bralirwa, which trades under the symbol BLR. The Rwanda Stock Exchange replaced the Rwanda Over The Counter Exchange that had been in operation since January 2008, with two companies, Kenya Commercial Bank Group (KCB) listed on 18 June 2009 and National Media Group (NMG), listed on 2 November 2010.

== Expansion ==
Having successfully launched Bralirwa as its pioneer initial public offering (IPO), RSE's second IPO was Bank of Kigali, launched on 31 June 2011. On 14 April 2015, Crystal Ventures announced its intention to have an IPO on the Rwanda Stock Exchange of its wholly owned subsidiary, Crystal Telecom. Crystal Telecom holds a 20% stake in MTN Rwanda, the country's largest telecoms company.

In February 2011, the National Bank of Rwanda, the country's Central Bank, contracted Central Depository and Settlement Corporation (CDSC), a Kenyan company, to serve the Rwanda Stock Exchange for one year and to train Rwandan staff until Rwanda can start and operate its own securities registry. On 7 December 2012, RSE launched the Rwanda Stock Exchange Share Index (RSESI), an independently calculated, rules-based, market capitalization weighted performance benchmark for Rwanda Stock Exchange's equities.

== The future ==
As of April 2014, the RSE trades five listed local and East African companies and also carries out trading of three government and one corporate fixed income instruments. The exchange, which is open five days a week, is a member of the African Stock Exchanges Association. The RSE operates in close association with the Nairobi Stock Exchange in Kenya, the Dar es Salaam Stock Exchange in Tanzania and the Uganda Securities Exchange in Uganda. There are plans to integrate the four stock exchanges to form a single East African bourse. In January 2016, The EastAfrican reported that three IPOs were in the pipeline.

== Market listing ==
As of February 2022

Number	Symbol	Company	ISIN-code	Notes
1.	BRL	Bralirwa	RW000A1H63N6	Brewing, bottling
2.	KCB	Kenya Commercial Bank Group	KE0000000315	Banking, finance
3.	NMG	Nation Media Group	KE0000000380	Publishing, printing, broadcasting, television
4.	BOK	Bank of Kigali	RW000A1JCYA5	Banking, finance
5.	USL	Uchumi Supermarkets	KE0000000489	Supermarkets
6.	EQTY	Equity Group Holdings Limited	KE0000000554	Banking, finance
7.	CTL	Crystal Telecom Rwanda	RW000A14UYP4	Mobile telephony
8.	IMR	I&M Bank Rwanda Limited	RW000A2DN989	Banking, finance
9.	RHB	RH Bophelo	ZAE000244737	Healthcare, investments
10.	CMR	Cimerwa Cement Limited		Cement
11.	MTNR	MTN Rwandacell Plc		Telecommunications

- Kenya Commercial Bank Group and Nation Media Group are primarily listed Nairobi Stock Exchange. They are crosslisted on the Rwanda Stock Exchange, the Dar es Salaam Stock Exchange and the Uganda Securities Exchange.
- Uchumi Supermarkets is primarily listed on the Nairobi Stock Exchange and is crosslisted on the Rwanda Stock Exchange and starting in 2014, on the Uganda Securities Exchange and the Dar es Salaam Stock Exchange.
- Equity Group Holdings Limited is primarily listed on the Nairobi Stock Exchange (2006). It is crosslisted on the Uganda Securities Exchange (2009) and on the Rwanda Stock Exchange (2015).
- RH Bophelo is cross-listed on the exchange with Johannesburg Stock Exchange in June 2020. It is the first company not from East Africa to be cross listed on the exchange.

== See also ==
- Economy of Rwanda
- List of stock exchanges
- List of African stock exchanges
- Nairobi Stock Exchange
- Dar es Salaam Stock Exchange
- Uganda Securities Exchange
