= Ethiopia Commodity Exchange =

Commodities exchange established in 2008 in Ethiopia

Coordinates: 9.011°N 38.747°E

- Type: Commodities exchange
- Location: Addis Ababa, Ethiopia
- Founded: April 2008
- Owner: Ethiopian government and participants
- Currency: Ethiopian birr
- Volume: 508,000 tons (2011)
- Website: www.ecx.com.et

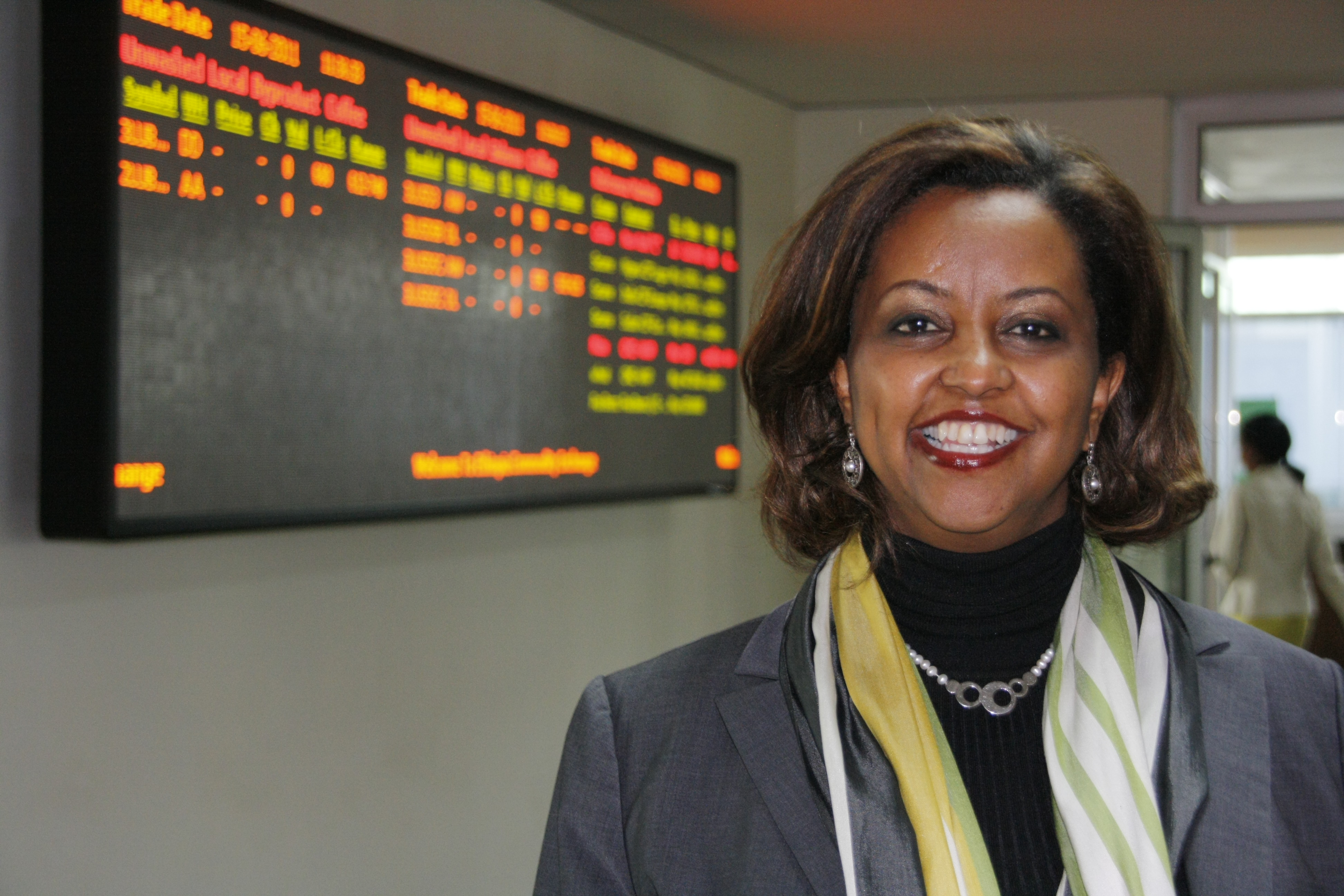
Eleni Gabre-Madhin at ECX

The Ethiopia Commodity Exchange (ECX) is a commodities exchange established April 2008 in Ethiopia. In Proclamation 2007-550, which created the ECX, its stated objective was "to ensure the development of an efficient modern trading system" that would "protect the rights and benefits of sellers, buyers, intermediaries, and the general public."

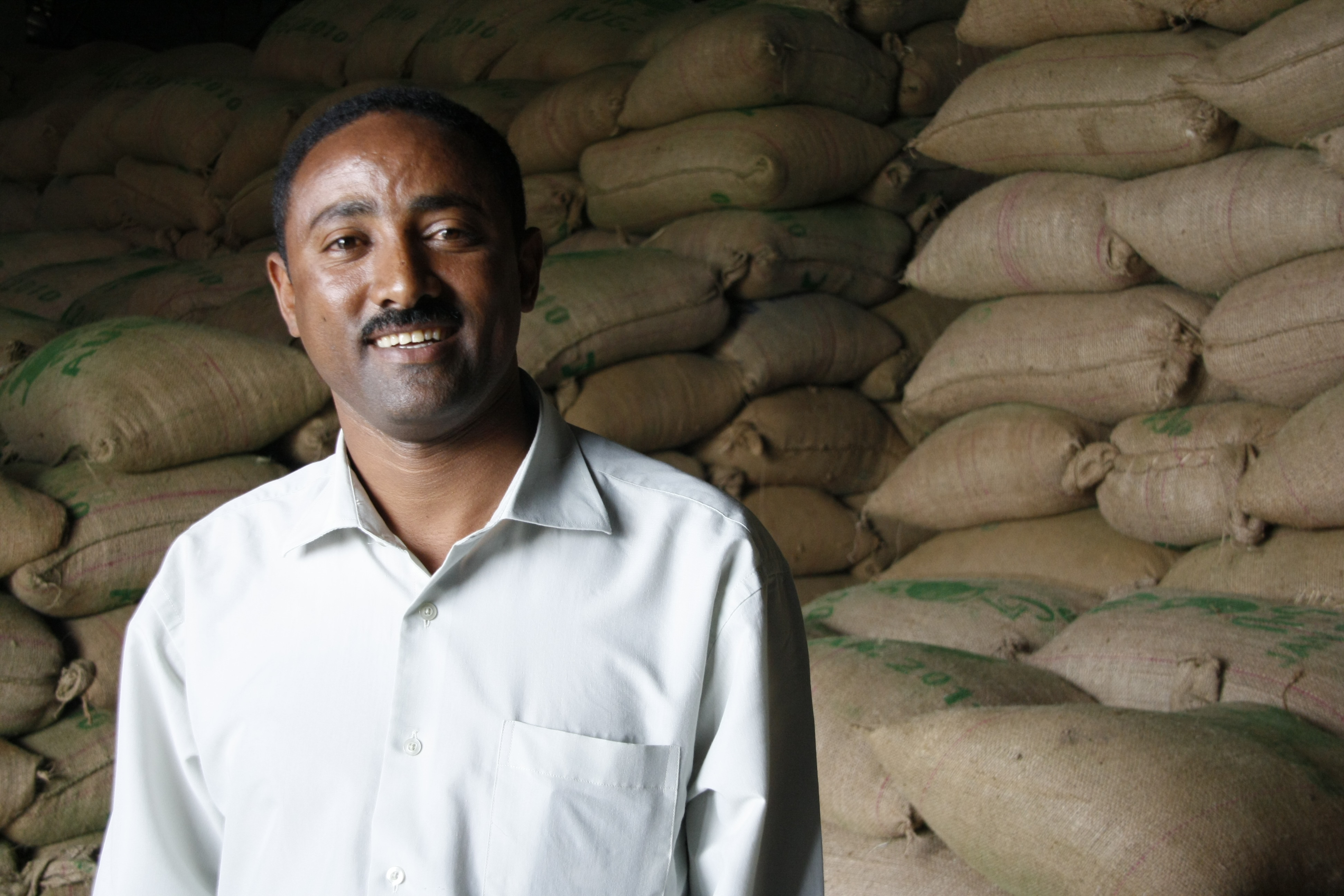
Yihenew Tsegaye, manager of the Ethiopia Commodity Exchange's Awassa warehouse, where Ethiopian coffee awaits exportation.

The ECX is set up as a private company owned by a partnership of the market actors, members of the exchange, and the Ethiopian government, led by Eleni Gebre Medhin a former economist for the International Food Policy Research Institute and the World Bank. As of July 2011, the physical presence of the ECX consists of 55 warehouses in 17 regional locations. It has grown from trading 138,000 tons in its first year to 508,000 tons in its third year, with nearly equal shares of coffee and oilseeds and pulses. The value of the ECX rose 368% between 2010 and 2011 to reach US$1.1 billion. As of November 2010, the trading floor in Addis Ababa handled 200 spot contracts in commodities such as coffee, sesame, navy beans, maize and wheat. It was assessed in July 2011 that membership equaled 243 with clients, who trade through members, about 7,800. Farmer cooperatives represented 2.4 million smallholder farmers, which make up 12% of the membership.

Currently, the ECX is the only stock or commodity exchange in Africa to have streamlined payment transfers down to "T+1" (ext day payment after a trade) from its clearinghouse to its partner commercial banks. Market data reach is expansive. "Push" price date is transmitted in real time to outdoor electronic ticker boards in 32 rural sites, the ECX website, 256,000 mobile subscribers via instant messaging, the radio, TV and print media. "Pull" market data is available through a toll-free phone-in service. The service received more than 1 million calls in September 2011, 70% coming from rural callers.

The first year of the Ethiopia Commodity Exchange's existence is documented in the PBS Wide Angle film The Market Maker.

== See also ==
- List of African stock exchanges
