= Bolsa de Valores de Mozambique =

First stock exchange in Mozambique

Mozambique Stock Exchange
- Bolsa de Valores de Moçambique
- Location: Maputo, Mozambique
- Founded: 1999
- No. of listings: 14
- Website: www.bvm.co.mz

Bolsa de Valores de Moçambique (BVM) or Maputo Stock Exchange is the first stock exchange in Mozambique. It was opened in 1999, with the support of the Lisbon Stock Exchange and the World Bank.

== Early years ==
Trading commenced on 14 October 1999, with the exchange's first listing being a short-term treasury bill from the Mozambican government. In its early years, the BVM was limited in its trading facilities, operating out of an annex in the country's Ministry of Finance. Due to the limited physical space, all trading was done remotely. Local companies also found it difficult to meet the BVM's listing criteria, and the market was dominated by a South African broker, Standard Bank. Trading government debt instruments became a major focus of the BVM.

Due to the lack of trading in the BVM, the exchange proposed a Segundo Mercado (lit. 'Second Market') with relaxed viability criteria. In this junior market, companies would not have to meet as strong of criteria for auditing and disclosure. The hope was that this would allow small and medium enterprises (SMEs), which provide around two-thirds of Mozambique's GDP, to trade on the market. The junior market was started in 2010, but by 2014, no companies had joined it.

== Expansion ==
The first SME was listed on the BVM in 2017. As of early 2017, the BVM had a market capitalization of $936 million USD, across four equity securities and two commercial papers. By 2020, the market capitalization was 10% of the Mozambican GDP.

A third market within the BVM was opened in 2019, with weaker criteria than either the main exchange or the Second Market. Seven companies participated in this third market by the end of 2023.

On April 25, 2023, the government approved the transformation of BVM from a public institution into a public limited company, entirely owned by the State but open to private shareholders in the future.

The BVM is a member of the African Securities Exchanges Association.

== See also ==
- List of African stock exchanges
