= Uganda Securities Exchange =

Principal stock exchange of Uganda

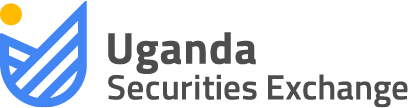
- Location: Kampala, Uganda
- Founded: 1997; 29 years ago
- Key people: Charles Mbire, Chair; Paul Bwiso,CEO
- Currency: Ugandan Shilling
- No. of listings: 20
- Website: www.use.or.ug

The Uganda Securities Exchange (USE) is the principal stock exchange of Uganda. It was founded in June 1997. The USE is operated under the jurisdiction of Uganda's Capital Markets Authority, which in turn reports to the Bank of Uganda, Uganda's central bank.

The exchange opened to trading in January 1998. At that time, the exchange had just one listing, a bond issued by the East African Development Bank. Trading was limited to only a handful of trades per week.

As of July 2014, the USE traded 16 listed local and East African companies and had started the trading of fixed income instruments. The exchange is a member of the African Stock Exchanges Association.

The USE operates in close association with the Dar es Salaam Stock Exchange in Tanzania, the Rwanda Stock Exchange, and the Nairobi Stock Exchange in Kenya. According to published reports in 2013, there were plans to integrate the four exchanges to form a single East African bourse.

Uganda All Stock Index (ALSIUG) is the benchmark Index of the Uganda Securities Exchange.

== Trading ==
A published report in February 2011 claimed that USE would increase trading to five days a week in March 2011.

During the first quarter of 2010, the USE adopted the Settlement and Clearing Depository electronic trading system. According to a published report in January 2011, other electronic modalities were being considered for the exchange. In 2010, the USE was the best performing stock exchange in Sub-Saharan Africa, with an All-Shares Index return of 74 percent between January and November 2010. On 20 July 2015, the USE initiated its electronic trading platform, backed by three independent data servers, cutting to three days (previously five days) the time it takes to settle trades.

== Market listing ==
As of October 2024

Number	Symbol	Company	Notes
1.	BOBU	Bank of Baroda (Uganda)	Finance, banking
2.	BATU	British American Tobacco	Tobacco products
3.	DFCU	DFCU Group	Finance, banking
4.	EABL	East African Breweries	Brewing, gin, distilled beverages
5.	JHL	Jubilee Holdings	Insurance
6.	KA	Kenya Airways	Aviation
7.	KCB	KCB Group	Finance, banking
8.	NVL	New Vision Group	Printing, publishing, broadcasting, television
9.	SBU	Stanbic Bank Uganda Limited	Finance, banking
10.	UCL	Uganda Clays Limited	Manufacturing, construction materials
11.	EBL	Equity Group Holdings Limited	Banking, finance
12.	NIC	National Insurance Corporation	Insurance
13.	UCHM	Uchumi Supermarkets	Supermarkets
14.	NMG	Nation Media Group	Publishing, printing, broadcasting, television
15.	CENT	Centum Investments	Investments, private equity, real estate
16.	UMEME	Umeme	Electric power distribution
17.	QCIL	Quality Chemical Industries Limited	Pharmaceutical manufacturing
18.	MTNU	MTN Uganda	Mobile Telephony
19.	AIRTEL UGANDA	Airtel Uganda	Mobile Telephony

=== Notes on market listings ===
(1) East African Breweries Limited, Kenya Airways and Jubilee Holdings, are primarily listed on the Nairobi Stock Exchange and are cross-listed on the Uganda Securities Exchange and on the Dar es Salaam Stock Exchange. (2) Centum Investment Company Limited, Equity Group Holdings Limited, and Jubilee Holdings are listed primarily on the Nairobi Stock Exchange and are crosslisted on the USE. (3) Kenya Commercial Bank Group and Nation Media Group are listed primarily on the Nairobi Stock Exchange and are crosslisted on the USE, the Dar es Salaam Stock Exchange, and the Rwanda Stock Exchange. (4) Uchumi Supermarkets, a regional supermarket retailer with headquarters in Nairobi, Kenya, is listed on the Nairobi Stock Exchange, is crosslisted on the USE and the Rwanda Stock Exchange, and plans to crosslist its shares on the Dar es Salaam Stock Exchange. (5) Umeme, the largest electric power distributor in Uganda, is listed primarily on the USE and is crosslisted on the Nairobi Stock Exchange. (6) Equity Group Holdings Limited is listed primarily on the Nairobi Stock Exchange (2006). It is crosslisted on the USE (2009) and the Rwanda Stock Exchange (2015). (7) In February 2015, Ugandan media indicated that both Housing Finance Bank and Crane Bank, which had intended to list their shares on the USE, have since changed their plans and put their IPOs on hold.

== Ownership ==
The exchange is owned by 16 stock brokers. In August 2016, a law was passed to allow the owners to sell shares in the stock exchange to members of the public through an initial public offering. On 18 May 2017, the USE demutualised and registered as a "public company, limited by shares". Its authorised share capital is USh 1 billion, consisting of 100 million shares of 10/= each. At incorporation, the paid up capital was USh 42 million, with each of the founding investor firms owning 6,000,000 shares, each valued at 10/= each.

The shareholding in the stock of the Uganda Securities Exchange is as depicted in the table below.

Uganda Securities Exchange Stock Ownership
Rank	Name of Owner	Percentage Ownership
1	African Alliance Uganda Limited	14.29
2	Baroda Capital Limited	14.29
3	Crane Financial Services Limited	14.29
4	Crested Capital Limited	14.29
5	Dyer & Blair Uganda Limited	14.29
6	Equity Stock Brokers Uganda Limited	14.29
7	UAP Old Mutual Financial Services Limited	14.29
	Total	100.00

Note The totals are slightly off due to rounding.

== See also ==
- List of African stock exchanges
- Economy of Uganda
- ALTX East Africa Exchange
- Ugandan shilling
- List of stock exchanges in the Commonwealth of Nations
