= Douala Stock Exchange =

Stock exchange in Douala, Cameroon

- Industry: Finance
- Founded: 2001
- Headquarters: Douala
- Key people: Mr Pierre Ekoulé Mouangue Directeur Général
- Products: Stock trading services
- Website: http://www.douala-stock-exchange.com/

The Douala Stock Exchange (DSX) was the official market for securities in Cameroon, located in Douala. In 2019 it was absorbed by the Central African Securities Exchange (French: Bourse des valeurs mobilières de l'Afrique centrale, BVMAC) which on that occasion relocated from Libreville to Douala.

== History ==
The origin of the market in Douala began in a project sponsored by CEMAC having to do with creating stock exchanges in Gabon and Cameroon. CEMAC is the abbreviation for Economic and Monetary Community of Central Africa.

The Douala Stock Exchange was created in December 2001. The first listing was Société des eaux minérales du Cameroun (SEMC), a subsidiary of the French company Castel Group.

DSX was owned by Association professionnelle des établissements de crédit du Cameroun (APECCAM), (Credit Association of Cameroon); by Cameroonian corporate interests; and by the government. It is similarly governed:

Administration Board:

- APECCAM : 7 seats
- Corporate : 2 seats
- Government : 1 seat
- Other : 1 seat

Until 2006, the sole listing was SEMC. Later it also included Société Africaine Forestière et Agricole du Cameroun (SAFACAM) and SOCAPALM.

== See also ==
- Economy of Cameroon
- Central African Financial Market Supervisory Commission
- List of African stock exchanges
