= Libyan Stock Market =

Stock exchange in Tripoli, Libya

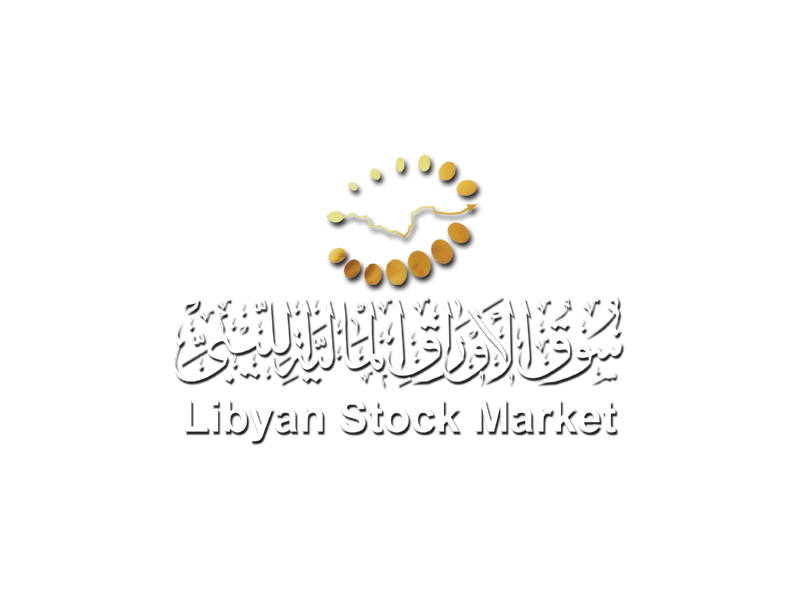
- Type: Stock Market
- Founded: March 2007
- Founder: Team of experts
- Headquarters: Tripoli, Libya
- Key people: Dr.Ahmed Karoud General Director
- Website: www.lsm.gov.ly

The Libyan Exchange Stock Market (Arabic: سوق المال الليبي) officially opened in Tripoli, Libya, during March 2007.

== Background ==
The Libyan Stock Market (LSM) was established by Decision No. (134) of the General People's Committee (GPCO), on June 3, 2006, to form a joint stock company with capital of 20 million Libyan dinars, divided into 2 million shares with a nominal value of 10 LD per share. The first phase focused on introducing financial definitions and rules, the addition of several workshop courses, and a series of agreements with the Amman Stock Exchange and Cairo & Alexandria Stock Exchange and the Egyptian Company for Clearance and deposit.

Listed market securities include the National Mills and Fodder Company, the United Insurance Company, Bank of deserts, and the Libyan Insurance Company, Sahari Bank, and the Hay Alandalus Domestic Bank. The volume of subscription on July 2, 2007, totalled 49539 shares, with a total value amounting to 346.773 LD.

A cooperation agreement was signed on 18 October 2007 by the Chairman of Administration and General Director of the Committee for Libyan Stock Exchange Market and the Director of the London Stock Exchange. The agreement provides for training teams from the Libyan Stock Exchange in Tripoli and in London to enable them to run the stock market operations. In addition there will be regular reviews of the Libyan regulations and systems, to modernize them from time to time, and for seminars and conferences organized by the London Stock Exchange.

In February 2011, the Libyan Stock Market closed following the eruption of the Libyan Civil War. It reopened on 15 March 2012.

In 2014, it closed its operations again due to the second Libyan civil war and resumed operations in December 2023.

== See also ==
- List of African stock exchanges
