= Capital Markets Authority of Kenya =

Government financial regulatory entity

Capital Markets Authority
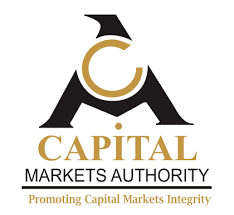

Agency overview
- Formed: March 7, 1990
- Type: Government agency
- Jurisdiction: Republic of Kenya
- Motto: Promoting the Integrity and the Growth of the Capital Markets
- Agency executives: Ugas S. Mohamed, Chairman of the Board of Directors; Wyckliffe M. Shamiah, Chief Executive Officer
- Parent department: Ministry of the National Treasury & Planning
- Website: www.cma.or.ke

The Capital Markets Authority of Kenya (CMA) is a government financial regulatory entity responsible for supervising, licensing and monitoring the activities of the capital markets within the Republic of Kenya, market intermediaries, including the stock exchange, and the central depository and settlement system and all other persons licensed under the Capital Markets Act of Kenya.

The CMA works to protect investors by ensuring that the stock exchange remains transparent. The authority also publishes an annual review recognising companies that have conducted robust corporate governance audits and identifying laggards.

== Board members ==
As of 2026, the Ugas S. Mohamed is the chairman of the board, while Wyckliffe M. Shamiah is the chief executive officer.

== See also ==
- Nairobi Stock Exchange
- List of financial supervisory authorities by country
