= Nairobi Securities Exchange =

Stock exchange of Nairobi, Kenya

- Type: Stock exchange Public Company
- Location: Nairobi, Nairobi County, Kenya
- Founded: 1954; 72 years ago
- Key people: Tom Mulwa - Non-Executive Chairman; Frank Mwiti - CEO
- Currency: Kenyan shilling
- No. of listings: 162
- Market cap: KSh. 1,807.88 Billion/= 25 October 2024
- Volume: 5.8 billion units(2016) 6.8 billion units (2015)
- Indices: NSE All Share Index; NSE 20 Share Index; FTSE NSE Indices; FTSE NSE Kenya 15 Index; FTSE NSE Kenya 25 Index; FTSE NSE Kenya Govt. Bond Index; FTSE ASEA Pan African Index
- Website: NSE.co.ke

The Nairobi Securities Exchange (NSE) was established in 1954 as the Nairobi Stock Exchange, based in Nairobi, the capital of Kenya. It was a voluntary association of stockbrokers in the European community registered under the Societies Act in British Kenya. The exchange had 66 listed companies in February 2021.

== History ==
=== Founding Nairobi Stock Exchange (1954–1999) ===
The Nairobi Stock Exchange was established in 1954 in Nairobi, the capital of Kenya. It was a voluntary association of stockbrokers in the European community registered under the Societies Act in British Kenya. Previous to its founding, dealing in shares and stocks started in the 1920s when it was the British colonial Kenya Colony (1920−1963), a part of the British Empire. A stock exchange was first floated in 1922 at the Exchange Bar in the Stanley Hotel in Nairobi. However, the market was not formal as there did not exist any rules and regulations to govern stock broking activities. Trading took place on a ‘gentleman's agreement.’ Standard commissions were charged with clients being obligated to honor their contractual commitments of making good delivery and settling relevant costs. At that time, stock broking was a sideline business conducted by accountants, auctioneers, estate agents and lawyers who met to exchange prices over a cup of coffee. Because these firms were engaged in other areas of specialization, the need for association did not arise. In 1951, an estate agent named of Francis Drummond established the first professional stock broking firm. He also approached the finance minister of Kenya, Sir Ernest Vasey, and impressed upon him the idea of setting up a stock exchange in East Africa. The two approached London Stock Exchange officials in July 1953 and the London officials accepted to recognize the setting up of the Nairobi Stock Exchange as an overseas stock exchange. In 1954 the Nairobi Stock Exchange was then constituted as a voluntary association of stockbrokers registered under the Societies Act.

Since Africans and Asians were not permitted to trade in securities, until after the attainment of independence in 1963, the business of dealing in shares was confined to the resident European community. At the dawn of independence, stock market activity slumped due to uncertainty about the future of independent Kenya. 1988 saw the first privatization through the NSE with the sale of a 20% government stake in Kenya Commercial Bank. The sale left the Government of Kenya and affiliated institutions retaining 80% ownership of the bank. Notably, on 18 February 1994 the NSE 20-Share Index recorded an all-record high of 5030 points. The NSE was rated by the International Finance Corporation (IFC) as the best performing market in the world with a return of 179% in dollar terms. The NSE also moved to more spacious premises at the Nation Centre in July 1994, setting up a computerized delivery and settlement system (DASS). For the first time since the formation of the Nairobi Stock Exchange, the number of stockbrokers increased with the licensing of eight new brokers.

In 1996 saw the largest share issue in the history of NSE with the privatization of Kenya Airways. Having sold a 26% stake to KLM, the Government of Kenya proceeded to offer 235,423,896 shares (51% of the fully paid and issued shares of KSh.5/= each) to the public at KSh.11/25 per share. More than 110,000 shareholders acquired a stake in the airline and the Government of Kenya reduced its stake from 74% to 23%. The Kenya Airways Privatization team was awarded the World Bank Award for Excellence for 1996 for being a model success story in the divestiture of state-owned enterprises. In 1998 the government expanded the scope for foreign investment by introducing incentives for capital markets growth including the setting up of tax‐free Venture Capital Funds, removal of Capital Gains Tax on insurance companies' investments, allowance of beneficial ownership by foreigners in local stockbrokers and fund managers and the envisaged licensing of Dealing Firms to improve market liquidity. On 1 January 1999, Kenya adopted the International Accounting Standards (IAS) as the local accounting standard.

=== Expansion (2000–2005) ===
NSE implemented a new trading cycle, (T+5) in August 2000. The Central Depository System Act (CDS) and the amended CMA Act covering Collective Investment Schemes (CIS) were passed by parliament and affirmed by the president, paving the way for the full implementation of the CDS and for the introduction of collective investment schemes in the Kenyan market. Following a partnership agreement with the Association of National Numbering Agencies (ANNA), the global securities numbering agency, in September 2000 the NSE was appointed the national numbering agency (NNA) for Kenya, making it responsible for issuing the ISIN for financial securities issued under Kenyan jurisdiction in accordance with ANNA's ISO 6166 guidelines. In October 2000 NSE became a member of ANNA.

In April 2002 CMA announced the approval of the new NSE trading and settlement rules. The amount for block trades was revised upwards from Kshs. 3.0 million to between KSh.50 – 200 million/=. The block trade rules now applied to trade values above KSh.50 million/= but less than KSh.200 million/=. Lastly, the brokerage commissions’ regime was liberalized. July 2002 saw the foreign investor regulations amended, providing for a 25% minimum reserve of the issued share capital for Kenyan citizens, while the balance of the 75% becomes a free float for all classes of investors. Within this 75% share holding available to all classes of investors, there is no restriction on the amount to be held by a single foreign investor. The signing of the shareholders’ agreement for the Central Depository and Settlement Corporation (CDSC) was done in August 2002. The shareholders consisted of the Nairobi Stock Exchange (20%), the Association of Kenya Stockbrokers (18%), the CMA Investor Compensation Fund (7%), and 9 institutional investors through the Capital Markets Challenge Fund (50%) who collectively invested in the CDSC. The CDSC being the legal entity that owns and runs the clearing, settlement, depository and registry system for securities traded in Kenya's capital markets. As of November 2002, the NSE became the sole NNA in Kenya, responsible for allocating the unique code for quoted and unquoted securities domiciled in Kenya.

In March 2003 the CDSC in collaboration with the NSE commenced the CDS Education Campaign in preparation for the market automation. The first CDS Education Workshop, with the theme "The CDS Legal & Regulatory Framework" kicked off. The NSE celebrated its Golden Jubilee in 2004, and also hosted the 8th ASEA conference. In this celebration, the first NSE magazine dubbed "The Exchange" and, The Central Depository & Settlement Corporation (CDSC), which manages Central Depository Systems, were both launched. For the year ending 31 December 2003, the exchange recorded an equity turnover exceeding KSh.15.25 billion/=, more than the combined equity turnover recorded in the previous five years. For the year ending 31 December 2004, the exchange recorded an equity turnover exceeding KSh.22.32 billion/=; an increase of 46.37% over the corresponding period for 2003. For the year ending 31 December 2005, the exchange recorded an equity turnover exceeding KSh.36.52 billion/= (a 63.61% increase over the previous year's performance of Kshs. 22.32 billion).

=== New technologies and indices (2006–2010) ===
In May 2006, NSE formed a demutualisation committee to spearhead the process of demutualisation. A demutualisation consultant (Ernst and Young) was appointed to advise on the process. In September 2006 live trading on the automated trading systems of the Nairobi Stock Exchange was implemented. The ATS was sourced from[Millennium Information Technologies (MIT) of Colombo, Sri Lanka, who are also the suppliers of the Central Depository System (CDS). MIT have also supplied similar solutions to the Colombo Stock Exchange and the Stock Exchange of Mauritius. The NSE ATS solution was customized to uphold the spirit of the open outcry trading rules in an automated environment. In the same breadth, trading hours increased from two (10:00 am – 12:00 pm) to three (10:00 am – 1:00 pm). Other innovations included the removal of the block trades board and introduction of the functionality for the trading of rights in the same manner as equities. Besides trading equities, the ATS trades immobilized corporate bonds and treasury bonds.

An MoU between the Nairobi Stock Exchange and Uganda Securities Exchange was signed in November 2006 on mass cross listing. The MoU allowed listed companies in both exchanges to dualist, to facilitate growth and development of the regional securities markets. In February 2007 NSE upgraded its website, in part to boost data vending business. In July 2007 NSE reviewed the Index and announced the companies that would constitute the NSE Share Index. The review of the NSE 20‐share index was aimed at ensuring it is a true barometer of the market. A wide area network (WAN) platform was implemented in 2007; this eradicated the need for brokers to send their staff (dealers) to the trading floor to conduct business. Trading is now mainly conducted from the brokers' offices through the WAN. However, brokers under certain circumstances can still conduct trading from the floor of the NSE.

In 2008, the NSE All Share Index (NASI) was introduced as an alternative index. Its measure is an overall indicator of market performance. The Index incorporates all the traded shares of the day. Its attention is therefore on the overall market capitalization rather than the price movements of select counters. In April 2008, NSE launched the NSE Smart Youth Investment Challenge to promote stock market investments among Kenyan youth. The objective of the challenge was threefold:

- To occupy the minds of the youth positively and draw them away from the negative energy created by the current political, economic and social situation in the country;
- Encourage the culture of thrift and saving funds amongst the university students;
- Encourage the youth to invest their savings in the capital markets.

After the resignation of Chris Mwebesa, the NSE board appointed Peter Mwangi to be the new NSE chief executive in November 2008. The Complaints Handling Unit (CHU) was launched in August 2009 to bridge the confidence gap with NSE retail investors and have any concerns processed and resolved. Also in 2009, NSE launched the Complaints Handling Unit (CHU) SMS System. The Nairobi Stock Exchange marked the first day of automated trading in government bonds through the Automated Trading System (ATS) in November 2009. The automated trading in government bonds marked a significant step in the efforts by the NSE and CBK towards creating depth in the capital markets by providing the necessary liquidity. In December 2009, NSE marked a milestone by uploading all government bonds on the ATS.

=== Nairobi Securities Exchange (2011–2023) ===
In July 2011, the Nairobi Stock Exchange Limited, changed its name to the Nairobi Securities Exchange Limited. The change reflected the NSE's strategic plan to become a full service securities exchange supporting trading, clearing and settlement of equities, debt, derivatives and other associated instruments. In the same year, the equity settlement cycle moved from the previous T+4 settlement cycle to the T+3 settlement cycle. This allowed investors who sell their shares to get their money three days later, while buyers have their CDS credited at the same time. In September 2011 the Nairobi Securities Exchange converted from a company limited by guarantee to a company limited by shares and adopted a new Memorandum and Articles of Association reflecting the change. In October 2011, the Broker Back Office system commenced operations, which facilitates internet trading. In November 2011 the FTSE NSE Kenya and FTSE NSE Kenya 25 Indices were launched, after NSE consulted local asset owners and fund managers, focusing on diverse domestic investment in East Africa. In March 2012 the delayed index values of both new indices were made available on the NSE website www.nse.co.ke.

The NSE became a member of the Financial Information Services Division (FISD) of the Software and Information Industry Association (SIIA) in March 2012. In May 2013, the NSE moved to the Exchange, 55 Westlands Road, Westlands, Nairobi. On 27 June 2014, The Capital Markets Authority proved the listing of the NSE stock through an IPO and subsequently self-list its shares on the Main Investment Market Segment. With the IPO running from 24 July 2014 to 12 August 2014, the listing made the NSE and the Johannesburg Stock Exchange the only self-listed exchanges in Africa. The NSE IPO was oversubscribed by 763.92%, making it the most oversubscribed share offer in the NSE's history. The NSE shares started trading on the Main Investment Market Segment of the exchange on 9 September 2014.

The NSE added two new listings in November 2014, the Flame Tree Group, an FMCG company and Kurwitu Ventures, a Sharia compliant investment company. Both were listed in the Growth Enterprise Market Segment by way of introduction. Effective 11 February 2015, CMC Holdings, Kenya's largest importer of vehicles and largest car-assembly company, was de-listed from the NSE, following its take over by the Al-Futtaim Group, based in the United Arab Emirates. In March 2015, the NSE officially joined the United Nations Sustainable Stock Exchanges (SSE) initiative whereby they made a voluntary pledge to inform their stakeholders of the importance of integrating sustainability in their capital markets.

The bourse had 66 listed companies in February 2021. The exchange's CEO, Geoffrey Odundo, told the press in April 2022 that NSE.NR was looking to purchase stakes in additional bourses in Africa. At the time, it was the fifth biggest bourse in Africa by market capitalization, and owned 5.9% in Tanzania's Dar es Salaam Stock Exchange. In December 2022, the NSE officially linked with seven other different capital markets in Africa, across 14 African companies. That month the NSE also introduced "fractional investing" in Kenyan stocks. It was reported on December 6, 2022, that foreign investors trading at NSE had halved within one week. At the time, the largest four stocks at the NSE by market capitalization were Safaricom, Equity Group, KCB, and EABL.

== 2024–present ==
=== Leadership change ===
In early 2024, the Nairobi Securities Exchange (NSE) underwent an executive transition following a period of low market performance in 2023. The outgoing CEO, Geoffrey Odundo, stepped down after nine years amid reports of low listings, capital outflows, and negative returns relative to other African exchanges.

On 20 February 2024, the NSE board announced Frank Lloyd Mwiti as Chief Executive Officer, effective 2 May 2024. The board cited the need for new leadership to support strategic reforms, diversify products, and modernise operations. Following his appointment, Mwiti outlined priorities including addressing legacy challenges, promoting technology adoption, expanding product offerings, and increasing retail and institutional investor participation.

=== Market performance ===
In 2024, the NSE recorded a rebound in market performance, driven by improved macroeconomic conditions, gains in large-cap equities, and a stronger Kenyan shilling. Data and market commentary indicated that the NSE was among the best-performing African exchanges in dollar terms for 2024.

=== Major listings and corporate actions ===
Between 2024 and 2025, the NSE recorded several key listings and capital-raising transactions:

Linzi Sukuk / Linzi FinCo ABS: Admitted to the Unquoted Securities Platform in mid-2024, followed by infrastructure-linked asset-backed securities, accompanied by public bell-ringing ceremonies.

HF Group Plc: Rights issue executed in 2024–2025, with details published in CMA filings and NSE circulars.

Sanlam Kenya: Rights issue in 2025, partially underwritten by strategic investors, with new shares listed on the Exchange.

East African Breweries (EABL): Medium-term notes and corporate bond listings reflecting resumed large-scale debt issuance.

Shri Krishna Overseas (SKL): Equity listing in July 2025, accompanied by a bell-ringing event.

Satrix MSCI World Feeder ETF: Secondary Kenyan-denominated listing in 2025, providing local investors access to a global ETF track.

Other structured finance and project-linked securitisations were admitted, often marked by NSE bell-ringing events.

=== Market reforms ===
The NSE implemented several reforms to enhance accessibility and modernise trading:

- Dematerialisation of share certificates and improvements in settlement efficiency.
- Removal of the mandatory 100-share board lot in mid-2025, allowing single-share trading to increase retail participation.
- Development of tokenisation and digital-asset infrastructure through the Kenya Digital Exchange (KDX) initiative and membership in the Hedera Governing Council.
- Establishment of the NSE Innovation Lab to support fintech experimentation, product prototyping, and technology adoption.

=== Inclusion and sustainability initiatives ===
EmpowerHER Patrons Circle: Programme to improve gender representation among investors through education, advocacy, and leadership support.

Sustainable Finance Centre of Excellence (SFCoE): Initiative to advance ESG integration, sustainability-linked instruments, and green finance.

=== Public engagement ===
High-profile bell-ringing ceremonies for major listings and securitisations were attended by government officials, including President William Ruto. The Exchange also signed memoranda of understanding to promote institutional investor participation, product innovation, and capital market development.

=== Communications ===
The NSE and its CEO actively communicate via official channels, social media, press releases, and media interviews, announcing policy changes, new listings, and strategic priorities.

=== Summary ===
The period from 2024 onward reflects a strategic phase for the NSE, marked by leadership change, market recovery, increased listings, investor-access reforms, technological innovation, and initiatives in sustainability and gender inclusion.

== Types of indices ==
These include:

- NSE 10 Share Index- Mean of top 10 performing companies under a certain review year
- NSE 20 Share Index- Mean of top 20 performing companies under a certain review year
- NSE 25 Share Index- Mean of top 25 performing companies under a certain review year
- NSE all Share Index (NASI) - designed to represent performance of Kenyan companies listed in the NSE
- NSE banking index - designed to represent performance of all banks listed in the NSE
- NSE Bonds Index

== Regional integration ==
NSE is a member of the African Securities Exchanges Association, East African Securities Exchanges Association and an affiliate member of World Federation of Exchanges.

== Subsidiaries and investments ==
Other than stock and bond trading as the main business of the NSE, the exchange has the following investments:

- NSE Clear Limited - 100% Shareholding - Nairobi, Kenya - Provision of clearing house services for the derivatives/futures exchange.
- Central Depository and Settlement Corporation Limited - 22.5% Shareholding - Nairobi, Kenya - Provision of clearing, settlement and depository services.

== Governance and ownership ==
Nairobi Securities Exchange, as of 2015, was governed by an eleven-person Board of Directors with Kiprono Kittony serving as the chairman of the group and Frank Mwiti as the CEO.

The shares of the Nairobi Securities Exchange are listed and traded on its own main board, under the symbol NSE. As of 31 December 2014 the shareholding in the bourse's stock were as depicted in the table below:

Nairobi Securities Exchange stock ownership
Rank	Owner	Percentage ownership
1	Standard Chartered Kenya Nominees	21.75
2	CfC Stanbic Nominees Kenya Limited	7.67
3	Cabinet Secretary, Treasury of Kenya	3.37
4	Investor Compensation Fund Board	3.37
5	Other	63.84
	Total	100.00

== See also ==
- Economy of Kenya
- List of African stock exchanges
- List of stock exchanges in the Commonwealth of Nations
- List of stock exchanges
