= Sarah Arapta =

Ugandan banker

- Born: Uganda
- Education: Makerere University (BA Economics); Heriot-Watt University (MBA)
- Occupation: Bank Executive
- Years active: 1998–present
- Title: Managing director & chief executive officer, Citibank Uganda

Sarah Arapta is a businesswoman and corporate executive from Uganda. She is the managing director and CEO of Citibank Uganda. She is also the Chairperson of Uganda Bankers Association since May 13, 2022

== Background and education ==
She was born in circa 1970s. She studied at local primary and secondary schools before she entered Makerere University, the oldest and largest public university in the country. She graduated with a Bachelor of Arts degree in Economics. She also holds a Master of Business Administration degree, awarded by Heriot-Watt University in Edinburgh, Scotland, United Kingdom.

== Career ==
Arapta was employed at Stanbic Bank Uganda Limited for a period of nearly five years. She started there as the Head Corporate Banking before becoming the Head of Investment Banking. She transferred to Barclays Bank of Uganda in January 2014 as the Director of Corporate and Investment Banking, serving in that capacity for one year and six months. In January 2016, she was appointed managing director and CEO of Citibank Uganda. She credited with growing Citibank Uganda's assets from UGX:951.1 billion ($262 million) in January 2016 to UGX:1.409 trillion ($388.3 million) in January 2022.

== Other considerations ==
Arapta is member of the five-person executive committee of the Uganda Bankers Association (UBA), where she served as the Chief Auditor, from May 2018 until May 2020. In May 2022, she was elected chairperson of UBA, replacing Mathias Katamba, who served in that role from 2020 until 2022. Her term runs until May 2024.

== See also ==
- Annet Nakawunde Mulindwa
- List of banks in Uganda
- Banking in Uganda
- Economy of Uganda
