= List of fund manager companies in Uganda =

Licensed Fund Managers in Uganda

These companies are licensed by Capital Markets Authority of Uganda:

- Britam Holdings
- Crested Stocks and Securities Limited
- Dyer & Blair Investment Bank
- Housing Finance Bank
- KCB Bank Uganda Limited
- Old Mutual Investment Group Limited
- Sanlam Investments
- Stanbic Bank Uganda Limited
- Standard Chartered Bank Uganda Limited
- Goldkach Uganda Limited
- ICEA Lion Asset Management (U) Limited
- GenAfrica Asset Managers Uganda Ltd
- Pearl Capital Uganda Limited
- Xeno Investments Uganda Limited
- Cornerstone Asset Managers Limited
- Asigma Capital Advisory Service Limited
- I&M Capital Limited
- Kura Asset Managers Limited
- ALA Capital Limited
- Alpha Asset Managers Limited
