= EFC Uganda Limited =

Financial service company in Uganda

Coordinates: 00°18′37″N 32°34′37″E

- Company type: Private
- Industry: Financial services
- Founded: 2012
- Headquarters: EFC House, Plot 45 Kira Road, Kamwokya, Kampala, Uganda
- Key people: Charles Nalyaali (chairman); Michael Ssekyondwa (managing director)
- Products: Loans, savings
- Total assets: UGX:112.8 billion (2021)
- Number of employees: 136 (2021)
- Website: efcug.com

EFC Uganda Limited (EFCUL), also known as EFC Uganda, was a microfinance deposit-taking institution (MDI) in Uganda whose license was withdrawn and liquidated by Bank of Uganda on 19 January 2024.

== Location ==
The headquarters of EFCUL were located at Plot 45 Kira Road, on Kololo Hill in the Kampala Central Division, about 3.5 kilometres (2 mi) north of the central business district of Kampala, Uganda's capital and largest city. The coordinates of the institution's headquarters are 00°20'12.0"N, 32°35'15.0"E (Latitude:0.336667; Longitude:32.587500).

== Overview ==
The institution opened in Uganda in June 2012 as Entrepreneurs Financial Center Limited, with one branch in Ndeeba in the Lubaga Division of Kampala. In November 2014, EFCUL was awarded an MDI banking license by the Bank of Uganda, adopting the name EFC Uganda Limited. As of December 2021, EFCUL owned assets of UGX:112.8 billion, with shareholders' equity of UGX:12.982 billion. At that time, the institution employed 136 staff. EFCUL focused on financing micro, medium, and small enterprises. In December 2015, EFCUL received a loan of UGX:10 billion for onward lending to micro, small, and medium-sized businesses.

== Shareholding ==
As of August 2016, the shareholding in the stock of the company was as depicted in the table below:

EFC Uganda Limited stock ownership
| Rank | Name of owner | Percentage ownership |
|---|---|---|
| 1 | Développement international Desjardins of Canada | |
| 2 | AfricInvest Financial Sector Limited of Mauritius | |
| 3 | Uganda Gatsby Trust of Uganda | |
| 4 | BIO of Belgium | |
| 5 | Bamboo Financial Inclusion Fund of Mauritius | |
| 6 | ASN-Novib Microcredit Fund of the Netherlands | |
| 7 | EFC Uganda Employee Stock Ownership Fund | |
| 8 | EFC Uganda Customer Stock Ownership Fund | |
| | Total | 100.00 |

== Branches ==
As of December 2015, the institution maintained networked branches at the following locations:

1. Kololo Branch - Ground Floor, Acacia Place Building, 6 Acacia Avenue, Kololo, Kampala
2. Ndeeba Branch - Master Wood Plaza, 1156 Kampala-Masaka Road, Ndeeba, Kampala; main branch
3. Kireka Branch - 1525 Kampala-Jinja Road, Kireka
4. Nansana Branch - Kampala-Hoima Road, Nansana
5. Nateete Branch - 1396 Kampala-Masaka Road, Nateete
6. Mukono Branch

== Closure and liquidation ==
On 19 January 2024, the Bank of Uganda revoked the banking license of EFC Uganda Limited, closed the institution and began its liquidation. The reasons stated for the revocation were under-capitalization and failure to adhere to the terms of its banking license.

== See also ==
- Banking in Uganda
- List of banks in Uganda
- FINCA Uganda Limited
- Pride Microfinance Limited
- UGAFODE Microfinance Limited
