= Agnes Namyalo =

Ugandan corporate executive

- Born: c. 1975 (age 50–51); Uganda
- Education: Makerere University (Bachelor of Arts in Mass Communication); Heriot-Watt University (Master of Business Administration); Strathmore University (Executive Leadership Education)
- Occupations: Banker and Corporate Executive
- Years active: since 1999
- Known for: Professional competence
- Title: Executive Director of KCB Bank Uganda Limited

Agnes Namyalo, also Agnes Mayanja Namyalo, sometimes Agnes Mayanja, (born c. 1975), is a Ugandan banker and corporate executive, who is the executive director at KCB Bank Uganda Limited, a commercial bank, effective March 2021.

== Background and education ==
She was born in the Central Region of Uganda in the 1970s. She attended local primary and secondary schools, before being admitted to Makerere University, Uganda's largest and oldest public university. She graduated with a Bachelor of Arts in Mass Communication degree from there. Her second degree, a Master of Business Administration, was obtained from Heriot-Watt University Business School, in Edinburgh, Scotland, United Kingdom. Ms Namyalo has also completed various professional courses in risk management and credit. She has attended several executive leadership courses at Strathmore Business School.

== Career ==
She started her banking career circa 1999, as a Leasing Administrator at DFCU Bank. She went on to higher responsibilities, including as Head of Credit, Head of Development and Institutional Banking, and as Head of Risk and Compliance. At the time she was recruited by KCB Uganda, she served as the Chief Risk Officer at DFCU Bank. She has been a member of the senior management team at DFCU Bank since 2006.

In her new role as Executive Director at KCB Uganda, she deputizes the Managing Director in achieving strategic goals and targets. She also serves as an executive member of the nine-person bank's board of directors. She is reported to be an expert in "enterprise risk management, operational excellence, and business growth".

== See also ==
- KCB Group
- Banking in Uganda
- List of banks in Uganda
