= List of microfinance deposit-taking institutions in Uganda =

This is a list of regulated microfinance deposit-taking institutions in Uganda. They are supervised and regulated by the Uganda Microfinance Regulatory Authority (UMRA).

- FINCA Uganda Limited
- Pride Microfinance Limited
- UGAFODE Microfinance Limited

== See also ==
- Banking in Uganda
- List of banks in Uganda
- List of companies based in Uganda
