= KCB Bank Rwanda Limited =

Bank of Rwanda

KCB Bank Rwanda Plc.
- Company type: Subsidiary
- Industry: Banking
- Founded: 2008
- Headquarters: Kigali, Rwanda
- Key people: John Bosco Birungi (chairman), George Odhiambo (managing director)
- Products: Loans, debit cards, savings, investments, mortgages, transaction accounts
- Revenue: ▲ Aftertax: US$2.5 million (RWF:2.1 billion) (FY:2015)
- Total assets: US$181 million (RWF:150 billion) (Q3:2016).
- Number of employees: 220+ (2010)
- Parent: KCB Group
- Website: rw.kcbgroup.com

KCB Bank Rwanda was a commercial bank in Rwanda and a subsidiary of Kenyan KCB Group. It was one of the banks licensed by the National Bank of Rwanda, the country's banking regulator.

As of June 2015, KCB Rwanda was a medium-sized financial service provider, with estimated total assets of about US$190.2 million (RWF:140 billion) and shareholders' equity of approximately US$16.3 million (RWF:12 billion).

== History ==
In December 2008, KCB Rwanda commenced banking services in Kigali, following licensing by the National Bank of Rwanda. Since then, the bank has opened fourteen (14) branches in the country. KCB Rwanda is a 100% subsidiary of the KCB Group.

Following the acquisition of BPR by KCB Group, KCB Rwanda was merged into Banque Populaire du Rwanda to form BPR Bank Rwanda Plc, making it the country's second largest bank.

== Branch network ==
As of November 2015, KCB Rwanda had a network of 14 branches across the country. This includes the following:

- Main Branch - Avenue de la Paix, Kigali
- Kimironko Branch — Kimironko, Kigali
- Nyabugogo Branch — Nyabugogo, Kigali
- Remera Branch — Remera, Kigali
- Gisozi Branch — Gisozi, Kigali
- Tropical Plaza Branch — City Centre, Kigali
- Musanze Branch - Musanze
- Rubavu Branch - Rubavu
- Muhanga Branch - Muhanga
- Huye Branch - Huye
- Rusizi Branch - Rusizi
- Kayonza Branch- Kayonza
- Nyarutarama Branch - MTN Centre, Nyarutarama, Kigali

== See also ==
- List of banks in Rwanda
- KCB Group
- Kenya Commercial Bank
- KCB Sudan
- KCB Tanzania
- KCB Uganda
