= Joshua Oigara =

Kenyan accountant and corporates executive

- Born: 1975 (age 50–51); Kisii, Kenya
- Education: University of Nairobi; Edith Cowan University; INSEAD; Fuqua School of Business; Institute of Certified Public Accountants of Kenya
- Occupations: Businessman, accountant, corporate executive
- Title: Group Chief Executive Officer; Kenya Commercial Bank Group
- Website: Corporate Website

Joshua Nyamweya Oigara (born 1975) is a Kenyan businessman, accountant and corporate executive and the current Regional Chief Executive Officer of Stanbic Bank. He is the immediate former Group chief executive officer of the Kenya Commercial Bank Group. He served in that position from 1 January 2013. until 25 May 2022.

Before that, he was the chief financial officer and Member of the board of directors of both KCB Group and KCB Bank Kenya, between January 2012 and January 2013. At age 37, his appointment in November 2012 to replace the outgoing CEO Martin Oduor-Otieno made him the youngest CEO of a publicly traded bank at the Nairobi Securities Exchange.

== Background and education ==
Joshua Oigara was born in Kisii, in southwestern Kenya in 1975. His parents, William and Diana Oigara, were both schoolteachers and tea farmers at the Gesima Settlement Scheme in Borabu, where he was raised.

After high school, he was admitted to the University of Nairobi for a Bachelor of Commerce degree, majoring in Accounting. He also pursued his accounting certification at Strathmore University School of Accountancy, graduating from both in 1997.

Later, he obtained a Master of Business Administration degree from Edith Cowan University, in Perth, Australia. In addition, he has attended postgraduate management courses in a plethora of universities and other training institutions, including INSEAD, in Paris, France, Fuqua School of Business, in Durham, North Carolina, United States, the International Institute for Management Development (IMD Business School), in Lausanne, Switzerland and the London Business School, among others. He is certified public accountant (CPA), recognized by the Institute of Certified Public Accountants of Kenya.

== Career ==
In 1997, following graduation from Nairobi University and Strathmore University, as a BCom, CPA graduate, Joshua received four job offers. He selected PricewaterhouseCoopers (PwC), working in their Nairobi office for the next four years.

In 2002, he left PwC and took up employment at Bidco Africa as the Group Business Performance Manager. From there, he was headhunted by Bamburi Cement, working there in various roles for seven years. In the process, he rose to the position of group finance director and chief financial officer.

He joined the Kenya Commercial Bank in November 2011 from Bamburi Cement. After one year as group chief financial officer, Joshua was promoted to group CEO and group managing director of the KCB Group. In his current position, he oversees group banking operations in Burundi, Kenya, Rwanda, South Sudan, Tanzania, Uganda and a representative office in Ethiopia.

In May 2022, he stepped down as CEO of the KCB banking conglomerate. However, he was expected to stay on until 31 December 2022, to support the transition.

== Personal life and net worth ==
Oigara is a married father of three children.

In 2015, Joshua Oigara publicly declared his wealth as: a net worth of KSh220 million (approx. US$2.2 million then), made up of total assets of KSh350 million (approx. US$3.5 million then), and loan obligations of KSh130 million (approx. US$1.3 million at that time), with a monthly gross salary of KSh4.9 million (approx. US$49,000 then).

== See also ==
- Jeremy Awori
- Bob Collymore
- Paul Russo (banker)
