= Nadine Byarugaba =

Ugandan banker & management consultant

- Born: Uganda
- Education: Makerere University (Bachelor's degree); Heriot-Watt University (MBA)
- Occupation: Management consultant
- Years active: 1995–present
- Title: Chairperson Absa Bank Uganda Limited
- Spouse: Richard Byarugaba

Nadine Byarugaba, is a Ugandan businesswoman, and management consultant. She is the current chairperson of the board of directors of Absa Bank Uganda Limited, effective 28 July 2020. Before that, from September 2019, she served on the same board, as chairperson in acting capacity, replacing Swithin Munyantwali, who was appointed non-executive director to the board of Absa Group Limited.

== Background and education ==
Nadine was born in Uganda and attended local primary and secondary schools. She obtained er Bachelor's degree from Makerere University. She also holds a Master of Business Administration degree, from Heriot-Watt University, in Edinburgh Scotland.

== Career ==
Her banking experience goes back at least 25 years, as of 2020. She has worked at Standard Chartered Uganda, in various roles, including (a) as Regional Head of eCommerce Sales, Africa (b) as Head of Global Markets (c) as Head of Internal Control and (d) as Systems Administrator. She was appointed to the board of Absa Bank Uganda (at that time Barclays Bank Uganda) in January 2016.

During the ten months that she served as acting Chairperson of Absa Uganda, Nadine guided the bank through the rebrand from Barclays to Absa. She also supervised the change of CEOs at the bank, from Nazim Mahmood to Mumba Kalifungwa. In addition, she spearheaded the bank's response to the COVID-19 pandemic, including donations to the Uganda Ministry of Health and to the Uganda National Response Fund to COVID-19.

== Other responsibilities ==
In addition to her responsibilities at Absa Uganda, she also sits on the board of New Faces New Voices, a Pan-African advocacy group, under the Graca Machel Trust. New Faces New Voices focuses on expanding the role of women in the financial sector. In addition, she is a member of the board of Uganda Reinsurance Company Limited, where she is a non-executive director.

== See also ==
- Uganda Economy
- Absa Group
- Uganda Banks
- Banks in Africa
