= Oyet =

Oyet is a surname of African origin.

People with the surname include:

- Julia Clare Oyet, Ugandan banker
- Nathaniel Oyet, South Sudanese politician
- Ugbana Oyet (born 1976) is a Nigerian-born British chartered engineer and Serjeant-at-Arms of the House of Commons

== See also ==
- Oyetunde
- Ballen i øyet
