= Damoni Kitabire =

Ugandan economist

- Citizenship: Ugandan
- Education: Makerere University, University of Bradford, University of Strathclyde
- Occupations: banker, economist

Damoni Kitabire (1958) is a Uganda economist and chairman of the board of Stanbic Bank Uganda.

== Educational background ==
Kitabire holds a Bachelor's degree of Arts in Economics from Makerere University and a Master of Arts in Economic Policy and Planning from the University of Bradford, United Kingdom. He also holds a Master of Science (MSc) in Finance from the University of Strathclyde, UK, and a Diploma in National Economic Planning from the Central School of Planning, Warsaw, Poland.

== Career ==
Kitabire served as a Senior Economist at the Ministry of Finance, Planning and Economic Development in Uganda from 1982 until 1999 and he was a Senior Economist in the Policy Development and Review Department at the International Monetary Fund in Washington, D.C., from 1999 to 2003.

He served as Macroeconomic Advisor at the Ministry of Finance from 2004 to 2007 and previously held senior technical positions there, including Commissioner for Macroeconomic Policy, Director of Budget, and Director of Economic Affairs at various points in his career.

Kitabire served as Lead Economist at the African Development Bank in Tunisia and as Advisor to the Vice President for Regional Operations at the African Development Bank. He later served as Country Manager for the African Development Bank in Zambia and subsequently in Zimbabwe. He is currently the Chairman of the Board of Stanbic Bank Uganda.

== See also ==
Mumba Kalifungwa

Stanbic Bank

Samuel Mwogeza
