= Mercantile Credit Bank =

Ugandan financial institution

- Company type: Private company
- Industry: Financial services
- Founded: 1981; 45 years ago and commenced operations 1986
- Defunct: June 18, 2024
- Headquarters: Kampala, Uganda
- Key people: Ambassador Stephen Nabeta (chairman), Mr. Paul Senyomo (managing director)
- Products: Loans, Savings, investments, Leases, Foreign currency trading
- Revenue: ▲Aftertax:US$68,750+ (UGX:174 million) (2012)
- Total assets: US$9.9 million (UGX:25 billion) (2012)
- Website: mcb.co.ug

Mercantile Credit Bank (MCB), was a Ugandan tier II financial institution licensed by the Bank of Uganda, the national banking regulator.

MCB was classified as "credit institution", one of only four such institutions in this class of financial service providers in the country.

As of December 2011, the bank's total assets exceeded US$6.6 million (UGX:16.5 billion), with shareholders' equity of approximately US$1.6 million (UGX:4 billion). In December 2012, the total assets were estimated at US$9.9 million (UGX:25 billion) following its growth in operations.

== History ==
MCB was registered as a Merchant Bank in 1981 and commenced operations in 1986. Following the review of the banking laws in Uganda that led to the financial Institutions Act of 2004, MCB was categorised as a Tier II Institution. As a tier II financial institution, MCB is allowed to establish customer savings and fixed deposit accounts and other core banking products including provision of credit facilities, fund transfers and foreign exchange trading given the nature of its license.

On 18 June 2024, the Bank of Uganda revoked the license of Mercantile Credit Bank and closed the institution on account of undercapitalization and failure to adhere to the terms of its license.

== Branch network ==
The institution's outreach strategy was supported by the Agency Banking model and the partnerships it has with Top Tier I Supervised financial Institutions. MCB maintained its branch headquarters at Plot 8 Old Port Bell Road, in Kampala's central business district.

== See also ==
- Banking in Uganda
- List of banks in Uganda
