= Byarugaba =

Byarugaba can be a feminine given name or a surname. Notable people with the name include:

- Byarugaba Grace Isingoma, Ugandan parliamentarian
- Clare Byarugaba, Ugandan LGBT activist
- Nadine Byarugaba, Ugandan businesswoman
- Richard Byarugaba, Ugandan businessman
- Vicky Byarugaba (born 1954), Ugandan boxer
