= Richard Byarugaba =

Ugandan accountant and business executive

- Born: 1961 (age 64–65); Uganda
- Education: Makerere University (Bachelor of Science in statistics and economics); Association of Chartered Certified Accountants (Chartered Certified Accountant); Henley Management College; Diploma in Management
- Occupation: Business executive
- Years active: 1983 — present
- Known for: Business, management
- Title: Chairman of Old Mutual Investment Group Uganda
- Spouse: Nadine Byarugaba

Richard Patrick Byarugaba is a Ugandan business executive, banker, and entrepreneur. He serves as the chairman of the Old Mutual Investment Group Uganda, since 14 August 2025. He is the former managing director and chief executive officer of the National Social Security Fund (Uganda), a semi-autonomous retirement pension organisation for non-government employees in Uganda. He served in that capacity from November 2017 until November 2022. He was also listed in 2012 as one of the wealthiest individuals in Uganda.

== Background and education ==
Byarugaba was born in 1961 in the Western Region of Uganda. He attended Makerere University, Uganda's oldest public institution of tertiary education, graduating with a degree in statistics and economics. He is a qualified accountant with the Association of Chartered Certified Accountants of the United Kingdom (UK). He also holds a diploma in management from Henley Management College, also in the UK.

== Work experience ==
Byarugaba has held various positions over the years, with the majority in Uganda's banking sector. He started as a banking officer at Standard Chartered Uganda (Stanchart), in 1983. By 1992, he had risen to executive director for finance at Stanchart. In 1994, he was transferred to Stanchart's international headquarters in London, as the regional manager for finance, responsible for Africa. He returned to Uganda in 1997, where he joined Nile Bank Limited, a private retail bank. He became managing director of the bank in 2003. In 2007, Barclays, the British financial conglomerate, bought all the shares of Nile Bank Limited for US $27 million (UGX:52 billion). The new owners merged the bank with their existing banking interests in the country to form the existing Barclays Bank (Uganda). Byarugaba moved to Barclays Bank (Uganda) as the chief operating officer.

In 2008, when Global Trust Bank (Uganda) was established, the new owners appointed Byarugaba as managing director of the newly created bank. He held that position until 2010 when he left to become the managing director and chief executive officer of the National Social Security Fund (Uganda).

Byarugaba has also worked with Hospice Africa, the Palliative Care Association of Uganda, and the Uganda Institute of Banking and Financial Services. When he resigned from Global Trust Bank, he was the treasurer of the Uganda Bankers Association.

In August 2025 he was appointed chairman of Old Mutual Investment Group Uganda, a subsidiary of Old Mutual East Africa Group, based in Nairobi, Kenya and is in turn a subsidiary of Old Mutual, a South African financial conglomerate.

== See also ==
- List of banks in Uganda
- Geraldine Ssali Busuulwa
