= KCB Bank South Sudan Limited =

Bank of South Sudan

- Type: Private
- Industry: Financial services
- Founded: 2005
- Headquarters: Juba, South Sudan
- Key people: Peter Muthoka (group chairman)
- Products: Loans, savings, checking, investments, debit cards, credit cards
- Revenue: ▲Pretax: US$16+ million (KES:1.4 billion) (2013)
- Total assets: US$543.7 million (KES:46 billion) (2013)
- Website: ss.kcbgroup.com

Kenya Commercial Bank South Sudan Limited, sometimes KCB South Sudan, is a commercial bank in South Sudan. It is licensed by the Bank of South Sudan, the country's central bank and national banking regulator.

== Kenya Commercial Bank Group ==
Kenya Commercial Bank Group, also known as KCB Group, is a large financial services organization in East Africa, whose total assets were valued at approximately US$4.57 billion (KES:385.2 billion), as of 30 September 2013.

As of October 2011, KCB Group had the widest network of banking outlets in Eastern Africa, comprising over 220 branches and over 400 automated teller machines in Kenya, Burundi, Rwanda, South Sudan, Tanzania and Uganda. The companies that comprise the KCB Group include but are not limited to the following:

- KCB Bank Kenya Limited - Nairobi, Kenya
- KCB Bank Burundi Limited - Bujumbura, Burundi
- KCB Bank Rwanda Limited - Kigali, Rwanda
- KCB Bank South Sudan Limited - Juba, South Sudan
- KCB Bank Tanzania Limited - Dar es Salaam, Tanzania
- KCB Bank Uganda Limited - Kampala, Uganda
- Savings & Loan Kenya Limited - Nairobi, Kenya
- KCB Foundation Limited - Nairobi, Kenya
- KCB Sports Sponsorship Limited - Nairobi, Kenya

The stock of KCB Group is traded on the Nairobi Stock Exchange. The stock is cross listed on the Uganda Securities Exchange, the Rwanda Stock Exchange and on the Dar es Salaam Stock Exchange under the symbol KCB.

== History ==
KCB South Sudan was founded in 2005, following the cessation of hostilities between South Sudan and Sudan and the signing of the Comprehensive Peace Agreement (CPA) in Naivasha, Kenya. As of October 2013, KCB South Sudan maintained a network of 20 branches, serving over 138,000 deposit customers, representing 42% of all banking business in the country at that time.

== Ownership ==
KCB South Sudan is a subsidiary, owned 100% by the Kenya Commercial Bank Group, based in Nairobi, Kenya.

== Branch network ==
As of January 2014, Kenya Commercial Bank South Sudan Limited, maintained its headquarters in Juba, the capital of South Sudan and that country's largest city. The bank had a total of 19 networked branches in the various cities and towns in the country. Also in January 2014, KCB South Sudan closed its branches in Bentiu, Bor and Malakal, due to the then prevailing civil war in the country.

== See also ==
- Bank of South Sudan
- Economy of South Sudan
- KCB Group
- South Sudan Banks
