= Salaam Bank Uganda =

Islamic commercial bank in Uganda

Coordinates: 00°18′59.1″N 32°34′47.8″E

- Company type: Private: Subsidiary of Salaam African Bank of Djibouti
- Founded: 2012; 14 years ago
- Headquarters: Head Office, 4th Floor, Rwenzori Courts; Plot 2 - 4A Nakasero Road; Kampala, Uganda
- Key people: Michael Mande; Chief Executive Officer
- Website: Homepage

Salaam Bank Uganda, formerly Top Finance Bank Limited (TFBL), is a commercial bank in Uganda. The institution received an Islamic commercial banking license, on 8 September 2023. The license was personally handed over by the Acting Governor of the Bank of Uganda, Dr Michael Ating-Ego. It is the first commercial bank in the country authorized to operate according to Islamic Shari'ah law.

== Location ==
The headquarters and main branch of Salaam Bank Uganda are located on the 4th Floor, Rwenzori Courts, Plot 2 - 4A, Nakasero Road, Kampala, Uganda. This is within the Central Division of the capital city.

== History ==
In 2012, the institution was founded and registered on 14 June 2012. It was licensed on 8 September 2014 by the Bank of Uganda, as Tier II Credit Institution under the name Top Finance Bank. In August 2022 Salaam African Bank (SAB), a commercial bank based in Djibouti, acquired Top Finance Bank at an undisclosed price. SAB also maintains subsidiaries in Kenya and maintains a representative office in Ethiopia.

== Ownership ==
From inception in 2012, the institution was privately owned by the founders, who trace ancestry to China. As of August 2022, Salaam Bank Uganda is a 100 percent subsidiary of Salaam African Bank, of Djibouti.

== Branch network ==
The headquarters and main branch network of Salam Bank Uganda are located at:

1. Head Office, 4th Floor, Rwenzori Courts, Plot 2 - 4A Nakasero Road, Kampala, Uganda. Main Branch

== Governance and management ==
As of February 2024, Michael Mande, a technology professional, enthusiast and career banker, serves as the Managing Director and Chief Executive Officer. He leads a team of senior managers, responsible for the day-to-day management of the institution's affairs.

== See also ==
- Banking in Uganda
- List of banks in Uganda
