= Joan Mwandihi =

Kenyan volleyball player (born 1973)

Personal information
- Nationality: Kenyan
- Born: 27 March 1973 (age 53)
- Height: 170 m (557 ft 9 in)

Volleyball information
- Number: 15 (national team)

Career
Years	Teams
1994	Kenya Commercial Bank

National team
1994	Kenya

Joan Mwandihi (born 27 March 1973) is a retired Kenyan female volleyball player. She was part of the Kenya women's national volleyball team.

She participated in the 1994 FIVB Volleyball Women's World Championship. On club level she played with Kenya Commercial Bank.

== Clubs ==
- Kenya Commercial Bank (1994)
