= Namyalo =

Namyalo is a surname. Notable people with the surname include:

- Agnes Namyalo (born c. 1975), Ugandan banker
