= Paul Russo (banker) =

Kenyan banker and corporate executive

- Born: c. 1976 (age 49–50); Kenya
- Education: Moi University; Strathmore University
- Occupations: Human Resource Management Professional, Businessman and Corporate Executive
- Years active: 2000 – present
- Known for: Business leadership
- Title: Group CEO at Kenya Commercial Bank Group

Paul Russo (born c. 1976) is a Kenyan human resources management professional, businessman and corporate executive, who was appointed as the Group CEO at Kenya Commercial Bank Group effective 25 May 2022. Prior to his current assignment, he was the managing director and chief executive officer at National Bank of Kenya (NBK), a subsidiary of KCB Bank Kenya, acquired in 2019.

== Background and education ==
Russo was born near the settlement of Laisamis, in Marsabit County, in northern Kenya. He attended primary school in Laisamis. He then transferred to Mang'u High School, in Thika, Kiambu County, on scholarship from the Catholic Church. He holds a Bachelor of Business Management (BBM) degree awarded by Moi University in Eldoret. His Master of Business Administration (MBA) degree was obtained from Strathmore University in Nairobi.

He also holds senior executive certification for Africa from Harvard Business School. His Higher Diploma in Human Resource Management, was obtained from the Kenya Institute of Human Resources.

== Career ==
Russo's professional career goes back to 2000 when he joined the human resources department at Kenya Breweries Limited. Later he worked at Barclays Bank of Kenya (today Absa Bank Kenya). He then worked for brief stints at K-Rep Bank (today Sidian Bank) and at PwC Kenya. In 2008, he was hired by Barclays Africa Group (today Absa Group Limited), working as head of human resources in three divisions of the banking conglomerate. He was hired by the KCB Bank Group in 2014 and served there for four years as the Group Human Resources Director. In 2019, he was promoted to Group Regional Businesses Director for nine subsidiaries in the group.

As the CEO of KCB Group, Russo replaced Joshua Oigara who led the group for the previous nine years. Oigara will stay on at KCB Group for sometime, to "support the transition".

== See also ==
- Joshua Oigara
