= Annastacia Kimtai =

Kenyan business executive

- Born: Kenya
- Citizenship: Kenya
- Education: Bachelor of Arts; MA in Rural Ecenomics; MBA in Business & Strategic Management
- Occupation: Bank Executive
- Years active: 1998 — present
- Known for: Banking and Business management
- Title: Managing Director and CEO; KCB Bank Kenya

Annastacia Kimtai is a Kenyan banker, businesswoman and corporate executive, who serves as the managing director and chief executive officer of KCB Bank Kenya Limited, the Kenyan subsidiary of the KCB Group, a large multinational financial services conglomerate headquartered in Kenya with banking subsidiaries in the seven member countries of the East African Community.

She assumed her new role effective 12 April 2023. Prior to that, for the four months between December 2022 and April 2023, she served as the MD/CEO of KCB Bank Kenya in acting capacity. Before that, for a period of over 11 years, she was the Retail Banking Director at the same institution.

== Education ==
She was admitted to Dr. Bhimrao Ambedkar University (formerly Agra University) in Agra, Uttar Pradesh, India. From there, she obtained a Bachelor of Arts degree in economics and a Master of Arts in Rural Economics. Later, she graduated with an MBA in Strategic Management. She has trained in the Senior Executive Program at the Harvard Business School, among other leadership and management programs.

== Career ==
She started out as a graduate management trainee at a bank branch in Mombasa in 1998. She was promoted to branch manager in 2004. In 2011, she was appointed as the director of retail banking at the Kenyan subsidiary of KCB Group Plc, a role she served in until she was appointed as CEO/MD of KCB Bank Kenya Limited.

Her appointment is in line with Central Bank of Kenya guidelines that recommend the separation of duties of the holding company's CEO /MD (Group managing director/chief executive officer) from those of the CEOs of the group's subsidiaries. Annastacia Kimtai is the first individual to serve as CEO of KCB Bank Kenya Limited, a role previously served by the CEO KCB Group Plc.

== Personal ==
She is a married mother of three adult children, two sons and one daughter. She is of the Roman Catholic faith.

== Other considerations ==
In her role as CEO/Managing Director of KCB Bank Kenya Limited, she sits on the boards of KCB Group Plc, KCB Bank Kenya and KCB Group Foundation.

== See also ==
- List of banks in Kenya
- List of banks in Africa
