= Citibank Uganda =

Commercial bank in Uganda

Citibank Uganda Limited
- Company type: Subsidiary of Citigroup
- Industry: Financial services
- Founded: January 1, 1999; 27 years ago
- Headquarters: Nakasero, Kampala, Uganda
- Key people: Sarah Arapta: CEO
- Products: Loans, transaction accounts, savings, investments, debit cards
- Total assets: UGX:990 billion (US$262 million) (2019); UGX:913 billion (US$242 million) (2018)
- Number of employees: 40+ (2010)
- Parent: Citigroup
- Website: Homepage

Citibank Uganda, is a commercial bank in Uganda operating as a wholly owned subsidiary of New York–based Citigroup. It is one of the regulated banking institutions licensed by the Bank of Uganda, the national banking regulator.

== Overview ==
The bank is a medium-sized international bank that focuses on meeting the banking needs of large corporate customers as well as of those individuals with high net worth. As of December 2019, the bank's total asset valuation was approximately USh990 (US$262 million). As of 31 December 2015, shareholders' equity was about USh:155 billion (US$63.5 million).

The bank is an active participant in the promotion of financial literacy in Uganda, especially in the country's schools.

== See also ==
- List of banks in Uganda
- Banking in Uganda
- Economy of Uganda
