= Crested Capital =

Ugandan stock brokerage and investment company

Crested Capital Limited
- Company type: Private
- Industry: Investment; Financial services Brokerage
- Founded: 2004; 22 years ago
- Headquarters: First Floor, Impala House, 13/15 Kimathi Avenue, Kampala, Uganda
- Area served: Uganda
- Key people: Chairman: Thelma Awori; CEO: Robert Baldwin
- Products: Asset management, Brokerage service, Investment management, Advisory and Research
- Website: www.crestedcapital.com

Crested Capital, whose legal name is Crested Stocks and Securities Limited , is a Ugandan investment firm that engages in regional investment banking, securities, investment management, and other financial services with both individual and institutional clients. It is regulated by the Capital Markets Authority of Uganda, since 2005. The firm has been a member of the Uganda Securities Exchange, since 2008.

== History ==
Crested Stocks and Securities Limited was founded in 2004. They are regulated by the Capital Markets Authority of Uganda, since 2005. They have been a member of the Uganda Securities Exchange, since 2008. They are licensed to provide "financial services including investment advisory, research and publications, brokerage, and dealing in equities and government securities."

Operationally the firm is broadly organized in three departments, namely: (i) Brokerage (ii) Research and (iii) Investment Banking. However, Crested Capital does not (a) "manage funds on behalf of third parties" (b) "provide traditional banking services" nor (c) "operate insurance services". The firm's Research Department publishes periodic performance reports of the USE and the stocks and bonds listed there.

== Markets ==
Crested Capital was the sponsoring broker in the Airtel Uganda intended primary IPO in 2015, which was postponed to 2023. The firm was again selected as sponsoring broker when the telco listed 20 percent of its shareholding in December 2023.

In 2018 when Cipla Quality Chemical Industries Limited (now Quality Chemical Industries Limited) listed its shares on the Uganda Securities Exchange in an IPO, Crested Capital was selected as the lead sponsoring stockbroker to the listing.

== Achievements ==
When the Uganda Securities Exchange (USE) demutualised in October 2017, Crested Capital became a founding stockholder of the USE. Investment banks and stockbrokers who are founding stockholders in the USE include (a) African Alliance Uganda (b) Baroda Capital Limited (c) Crane Financial Services Limited (d) Crested Capital Limited (e) Dyer & Blair Uganda Limited (f) Old Mutual Financial Services Limited (g) Equity Stock Brokers Limited.

In 2018, Crested Capital was named "Broker of the Year" on the Uganda Securities Exchange for the calendar year 2017. The brokerage firm also won the "Client Origination Award" for the year 2017. This second award was for the "broker who raised the most brand awareness for the Exchange and the capital markets" and "facilitated new entries into the market, improved market share and enhanced customer loyalty".

== See also ==
- Uganda Securities Exchange
- List of investment banks in Uganda
- Umeme
