= KCB Bank Kenya Limited =

Commercial bank in Kenya

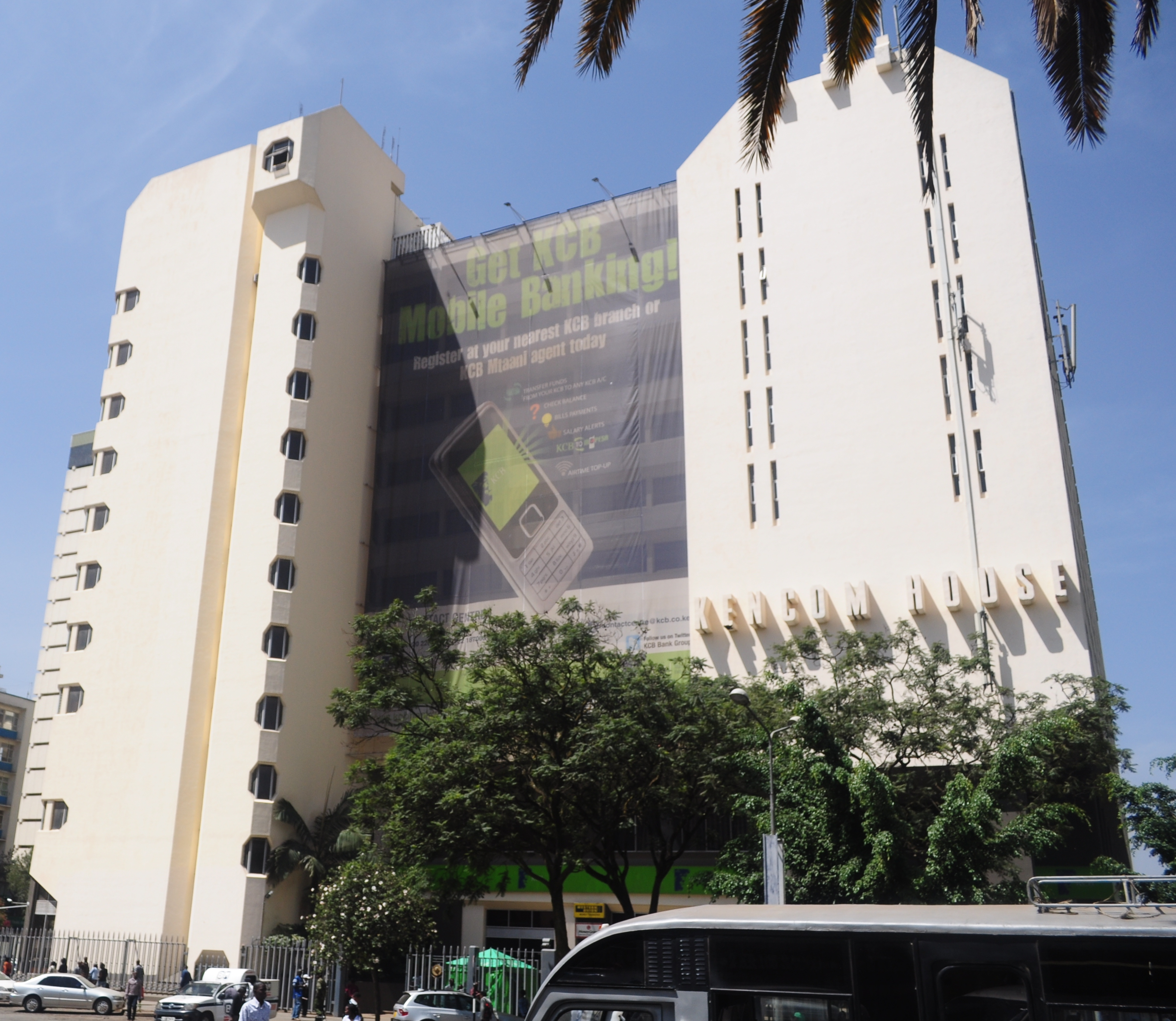
- KCB Bank Moi Avenue branch
- Type: Subsidiary of KCB Group
- Industry: Banking
- Founded: 2015; 11 years ago
- Headquarters: Kencom House, Moi Avenue, Nairobi, Kenya and KCB Plaza, Upperhill, Nairobi, Kenya
- Number of locations: 207 branches, 399 ATMs, 12,724 agents, 8023 merchant outlets (2020)
- Key people: Lawrence Njiru (chairman); Annastacia Kimtai (CEO)
- Products: Loans, credit cards, savings, investments, mortgages, insurance
- Revenue: ▲: Aftertax: US$166.3 million (KES:18.3 billion) (2020)
- Total assets: US$6.9 billion+ (KES:758.3 billion) (2020)
- Number of employees: 4901
- Parent: KCB Group
- Rating: B2 negative (2020) (Moodys Investor Service)
- Website: ke.kcbgroup.com

KCB Bank Kenya Limited is a financial services provider headquartered in Nairobi, Kenya. It is licensed as a commercial bank, by the Central Bank of Kenya, the national banking regulator. The bank has also been running an agency banking model.

== Overview ==
As of December 2015, KCB Bank Kenya was the largest commercial bank in Kenya, with assets of more than US$3.681 billion (KES:366 billion) and US$2.776 billion (KES:276 billion) in customer deposits. In August 2021, the bank recorded a customer deposit growth to USD5.47 billion (KES:601.7 billion) and had an asset base value of USD7.09 billion (KES:7.09 billion). During that time, it had 201 branches, 397 ATMs, and registered 15,273 agents and merchant outlets spread across Kenya.

== History ==
KCB Bank Kenya began in July 1896 when its parent company, KCB Group, was formed as a branch of the National Bank of India in Mombasa. In 1958, Grindlays Bank merged with the National Bank of India to form the National and Grindlays Bank. Upon independence, the government of Kenya acquired 60% shareholding in National & Grindlays Bank. In 1970, the government took full control of the bank and renamed it to Kenya Commercial Bank Group.

KCB Bank Kenya, as it is now known, was incorporated in 2015 as a result of the corporate restructure of Kenya Commercial Bank Group (KCB Group). Prior to 2015, KCB Group was both a licensed bank and a holding company for its subsidiaries. This was in compliance with the Kenya Finance Act No.57 of 2012. KCB Group Limited announced, in April 2015, its intention to incorporate a new wholly owned subsidiary, KCB Bank Kenya Limited, to which it would transfer its Kenyan banking business, assets and liabilities. The re-organisation converted KCB Group Limited into a non-trading holding company that owns both banking and non-banking subsidiary companies.

In 2016, KCB Group PLC was registered as a non-operating holding company to manage and oversee all KCB regional units in Kenya, Tanzania, South Sudan, Uganda, Rwanda, Burundi and Ethiopia. In 2019, KCB Group PLC acquired National Bank of Kenya.

== Ownership ==
KCB Bank Kenya Limited is a 100 percent subsidiary of KCB Group. Shares of KCB Group are listed on the Nairobi Stock Exchange (NSE), under the symbol (KCB). The group's stock is also cross listed on the Uganda Securities Exchange (USE), the Rwanda Stock Exchange (RSE) and the Dar es Salaam Stock Exchange (DSE).

== KCB Group Plc ==
KCB Bank Kenya Limited is a member of the KCB Group of companies. KCB Group companies include:

- KCB Bank Kenya Limited – Nairobi, Kenya
- National Bank of Kenya – Nairobi, Kenya
- KCB Bank Burundi Limited – Bujumbura, Burundi
- KCB Bank Rwanda Limited – Kigali, Rwanda
- KCB Bank South Sudan Limited – Juba, South Sudan
- KCB Bank Tanzania Limited – Dar es Salaam, Tanzania
- KCB Bank Uganda Limited – Kampala, Uganda
- Trust Merchant Bank - Lubumbashi, DR Congo
- KCB Foundation Limited, Nairobi, Kenya
- KCB Capital Limited, Nairobi, Kenya
- KCB Insurance Agency Limited, Nairobi, Kenya
- KCB Sports Sponsorship Limited – Nairobi, Kenya

== Branch network ==
As of August 2021, KCB Group had a total of 354 branches, 1,103 ATMs, and 15,273 bank agents and merchant outlets throughout all of its subsidiaries. It has the largest number of own-branded ATMs in Kenya. At that time, the Group had 26.8 million customers, making it the largest in the region.

== Officers and management ==
The chairman of the KCB Group board of directors is FCS Dr. Joseph Kinyua, and the chief executive officer and managing director of the group is Paul Russo.

== See also ==
- KCB Group
- KCB Burundi
- KCB Rwanda
- KCB South Sudan
- KCB Tanzania
- KCB Uganda
- Kenya Banks
