= FINCA Uganda Limited =

Microfinance institution in Uganda

Coordinates: 00°20′07″N 32°35′16″E

FINCA Uganda Limited(MDI)
- Type: Private
- Industry: Financial services
- Founded: 1992
- Headquarters: Plot 11B Acacia Avenue, Kampala, Uganda
- Key people: James Onyutta managing director
- Products: Loans, savings, Money Transfers
- Total assets: UGX:128.51 billion
- Number of employees: 550+
- Website: Homepage

FINCA Uganda Limited, also known as FINCA Uganda, is a microfinance deposit-accepting institution (MDI) in Uganda. It is licensed and regulated by the Bank of Uganda, the central bank and national banking regulator.

== Location ==
The headquarters of FINCA Uganda Limited are located at Plot 11B Acacia Avenue in Kampala Central Division, one of the five administrative divisions of the city of Kampala, Uganda's capital and largest city, about 5 kilometres (3 mi) north of the city centre. The coordinates of the company headquarters are 00°20'07.0"N, 32°35'16.0"E (Latitude:0.335278; Longitude:32.587778).

== Overview ==
FINCA Uganda was licensed as an MDI in 2004, although the institution has been in the country since 1992.

FINCA provides financial services to Uganda's lowest-income entrepreneurs with the aim of alleviating poverty through lasting solutions that help people to create jobs, build assets, and improve their standard of living. As an MDI, FINCA Uganda is a Tier III Financial Institution. It is therefore prohibited from dealing in foreign exchange and cannot issue checking accounts.

As of December 2015, the institution's asset base was UGX:128.51 billion, with shareholders' equity of UGX:42.67 billion.

FINCA Uganda was one of the first financial institutions in Uganda to introduce biometric technology in 2011.

== Ownership ==
It is a subsidiary and member organization of FINCA International, headquartered in the United States.

== See also ==
- Banking in Uganda
- List of banks in Uganda
- List of microfinance deposit-taking institutions in Uganda
- UGAFODE Microfinance Limited
- Pride Microfinance Limited
