= ABC Bank (Uganda) =

Tier II credit institution in Uganda

ABC Capital Bank (Uganda)
- Type: Private: subsidiary of ABC Bank (Kenya)
- Industry: Financial services
- Founded: 1992; 34 years ago
- Headquarters: Colline House; 4 Pilkington Road, PO Box 21091; Kampala, Uganda
- Key people: James Wilson Muwanga (chairman); Jesse Timbwa (CEO); Sreekumar Vamadevan (executive director)
- Products: Loans, savings, investments
- Revenue: ▲After tax: UGX:803.63 million (2022)
- Total assets: UGX: 62.14 billion (2022)
- Number of employees: 50 (2020)
- Website: Homepage

ABC Bank (Uganda), whose full name is ABC Capital Bank Uganda Limited, is a Tier II credit institution in Uganda that is licensed by the Bank of Uganda, the central bank and national banking regulator. Previously licensed as a commercial bank, the institution was given from 1 April 2024 to 1 July 2024 to re-organize as a Tier II institution, close all customer checking accounts and cease dealing in foreign exchange.

== Overview ==
The bank provides banking services to large corporations, small-to-medium-sized businesses (SMEs), as well as individuals. As of December 2022, the bank's total assets were valued at about UGX:62.14 billion, with shareholders' equity of about UGX:32.34 billion.

== History ==
ABC Capital Bank was founded in 1992 as Capital Finance Corporation Limited (CFCL), a Tier III Ugandan Financial Institution, under the licensure and supervision of the Bank of Uganda. In 1999, CFCL established a wholly owned subsidiary, CFC Forex Bureau. In 2008, CFCL signed a memorandum of understanding with ABC Bank (Kenya), identifying the Kenyan institution as a strategic investor in CFCL in the latter's efforts to transform into a commercial bank. On 26 February 2010, following the acquisition of a commercial banking license from the Bank of Uganda, CFCL rebranded as ABC Capital Bank.

== Ownership ==
ABC Bank (Kenya) is an investor in ABC Bank (Uganda). As of September 2019, the shareholding in ABC Capital Bank, is summarized in the table below:

ABC Bank (Uganda) stock ownership

Rank	Name of owner	Percentage ownership
1	ABC Bank (Kenya)	61.95
2	Others	38.05
	Total	100.0

== Branch network ==
As of December 2020, ABC Bank (Uganda) maintained networked branches at the following locations:

- Main Branch - Colline House, 4C Pilkington Road, Kampala
- Luwum Street Branch - Pioneer Mansion, 11 Luwum Street, Kampala
- Kikuubo Branch - Fami Plaza, 21 Nakivubo Road, Kampala

== Transition to Tier II status ==
In Q2 2022, the Ugandan Minister of Finance, in consultation with the Bank of Uganda, signed new regulations raising minimum capital levels for commercial banks from UGX:25 billion (approx. US$6.7 million) to UGX:150 billion (approx. US$40 million) by 30 June 2024. Due to its inability to raise the minimum capital requirements as stipulated, ABC Capital Bank was authorized to downgrade to a Tier II credit financial institution, whose minimum capital requirements of UGX:25 billion (approx. US$6.8 million) it met at that time.

== See also ==
- List of banks in Uganda
- Banking in Uganda
