= Opportunity Bank Uganda Limited =

Tier II credit institution in Uganda

Coordinates: 00°20′43″N 32°35′37″E

- Type: Private
- Industry: Financial services
- Founded: 1995; 31 years ago
- Headquarters: 1259 Old Kira Road; Kamwokya, Kampala, Uganda
- Key people: Phillip Karugaba; Chairman; Emmanuel Tineyi Mawocha, CEO
- Products: Loans, Savings, ATM, mobile banking
- Total assets: US$36.3 million (USh132 billion) (2019)
- Number of employees: 365 (2015)
- Website: Homepage

Opportunity Bank Uganda Limited (OBUL), is a Tier II credit institution in Uganda. It was previously registered as a commercial bank by the Bank of Uganda, the central bank and national banking regulator. The institution received a commercial banking license on 25 September 2019.

The Bank of Uganda gave OBUL between 1 April 2024 and 30 June 2024 to re-organize as a Tier II institution, close all customer checking accounts and cease dealing in foreign exchange.

== Location ==
OBUL's headquarters are located in Opportunity House, at 1259 Old Kira Road, in Kamwookya, a business and residential neighborhood within the city of Kampala, Uganda's capital. The geographical coordinates of the bank's headquarters are 0°20'43.0"N, 32°35'37.0"E (Latitude:0.345278; Longitude:32.593611).

== Overview ==
Opportunity Bank Uganda Limited was a Tier I Financial Institution (Commercial Bank), licensed by the Bank of Uganda, the central bank and national banking regulator. As of September 2019, the financial institution had total assets worth USh132 billion (US$36.3 million), with shareholders' equity of about USh28 billion (US$7.7 million).

In Q2 2022, the Ugandan Minister of Finance, in consultation with the Bank of Uganda, signed new regulations raising minimum capital levels for commercial banks from UGX:25 billion (approx. US$6.7 million) to UGX:150 billion (approx. US$40 million) by 30 June 2024. Due to its inability to raise the minimum capital requirements as stipulated, OBUL was authorized to downgrade to a Tier II credit financial institution, whose minimum capital requirements of UGX:25 billion (approx. US$6.8 million) it met, at that time.

== History ==
This microfinance institution was licensed in 1995 and began operations in 1996 as Faulu Uganda, a programme of Food for the Hungry International, a non-governmental organization. In July 1999, Faulu Uganda incorporated as a limited liability company in Uganda, becoming Faulu Uganda Limited. Under that name, the company became part of the Faulu network in Uganda and Kenya.

As a credit institution, it is not authorized to offer checking accounts or deal in foreign exchange. The company was however authorized to take in customer deposits and to establish savings accounts. It is also authorized make collateralized and non-collateralized loans to savings and non savings customers. The company later became affiliated with Opportunity International and became a member of their network. Opportunity International specializes in lending to the poorest of the working poor. As of December 2015, the institution's total assets were valued at US$20.53 million, with shareholder's equity of US$7.86 million.

In 2006, Opportunity Transformation Investments and Opportunity International Australia each purchased a 31.5 percent stake in Faulu Uganda Limited, giving Opportunity International a combined majority stake of 63 percent in the fourth largest microfinance institution in Uganda. In December 2009, Opportunity bought the remaining shares of Faulu Uganda, thereby taking outright ownership of the company. The financial institution was renamed Opportunity Uganda Limited. In November 2011, the institution rebranded to "Opportunity Bank Uganda Limited".

== Ownership ==
The company was owned by five different entities, as of October 2019.In October 2020, TLG Capital based in the United Kingdom, acquired 49 percent shareholding in Opportunity Bank Uganda in exchange for an undisclosed consideration. MyBucks of the United States exited the investment.

Opportunity Bank Uganda Stock Ownership
Rank	Name of Owner	Percentage Ownership
1	TLG Capital	49.00
2	Opportunity Transformational Inc	39.00
3	Faulu Trust	7.14
4	Opportunity International Canada	6.06
5	Food for the Hungry Organization	1.01
	Total	100.00

== Branch network ==
The branch network of OBUL has included the following locations:

1. Kira Road Branch - Plot 1259 Old Kiira rd (Opportunity House), Kamwokya
2. City Center Branch - Luwum Street, Kampala
3. Kawempe Branch - 494 Block 204, Goshen House, Kawempe
4. Nateete Branch - 715 Masaka Road, Nateete
5. Kikubo Branch - Kikubo Lane, Kampala
6. Gayaza Branch - Gayaza-Kampala Road, Gayaza
7. Nansana Branch - Hoima Road, Nansana
8. Jinja Branch - 9 Skindia Road, Jinja
9. Iganga Branch - 88 Main Street, Iganga
10. Mbarara Branch - 90 Highway Street, Mbarara
11. Masaka Branch - Edward Avenue, Masaka
12. Kalagi Branch - Mukono-Kayunga Road, Kalagi, Mukono, Uganda
13. Mubende Branch - 103 Lubanga Road, Mubende
14. Head Office - Plot 1259 Old Kiira rd (Opportunity House), Kampala
15. Mayuge Branch - Mayuge
16. Mbale Branch - Mbale
17. Lira Branch - Obote Avenue, Lira
18. Kyenjojo Branch - Kyenjojo
19. Hoima Branch - Hoima
20. Mukono Branch - Mukono
21. Kamdini Branch - Oyam
22. Soroti Branch - Soroti
23. Mityana Branch - Mityana
24. Abaita Ababiri Branch - Entebbe
25. Nakivale
26. Rwamwanja

== See also ==
- Banking in Uganda
- List of banks in Uganda
- Faulu Kenya
