= Geraldine Ssali Busuulwa =

Ugandan accountant and business administrator

- Born: 1975 (age 50–51); Uganda
- Citizenship: Uganda
- Education: Makerere University (Bachelor of Science); University of Manchester (Master of Business Administration); Chartered Institute of Management Accountants (Member, Chartered Institute of Management Accountants)
- Occupations: Accountant and business administrator
- Years active: 1990–present
- Title: Permanent secretary in the Uganda Ministry of Trade, Industry and Cooperatives
- Spouse: Victor Francis Busuulwa

Geraldine Ssali Busuulwa is a Ugandan accountant and business administrator. She served as the permanent secretary in the Uganda Ministry of Trade, Industry and Cooperatives after getting appointed on the 15th of July 2021.

Before that, she served as the Deputy managing director of the National Social Security Fund (Uganda) (NSSF Uganda) from 20 March 2011, until 29 October 2017. She was first appointed to that position on 20 March 2011 by Finance Minister Syda Bbumba. On 29 October 2014, she was re-appointed to the same position after ten months when she served as Acting managing director.

== Education ==
She was born in Lubaga Hospital to Agnes Ssali and Gerald Ssali, circa 1975. She attended Gayaza High School for her pre-university education. She studied at Makerere University, Uganda's oldest and largest public university, graduating with a Bachelor of Science degree in mathematics, statistics, and economics. She also holds a Master of Business Administration degree from Manchester Business School. She is a professional accountant and is a member of the Chartered Institute of Management Accountants.

== Work experience ==
Before her employment by NSSF Uganda, in March 2011, she worked as head of the Directorate of Management, in Her Majesty's Treasury in the United Kingdom. She served as deputy managing director of NSSF Uganda from 20 March 2011 until 31 December 2013. On that day the employment contract of Richard Byarugaba, the managing director expired and was not immediately renewed. Busuulwa was promoted to acting managing director (MD) while a search for a substantive MD was conducted. After a ten-month search, Byarugaba was re-appointed to his former post and Busuulwa was reappointed as his deputy.

In October 2017, the then Uganda Minister of Finance, Matia Kasaija, declined to renew Busuulwa's contract, following the board's recommendation. The board cited "less-than-satisfactory performance", during her tenure. She was replaced by Patrick Ayota, previously the head of finance at NSSF Uganda, from 2010 until 2017.

== See also ==
- List of government ministries of Uganda
