= Uganda Deposit Protection Fund =

Ugandan government agency

Coordinates: 00°19′53″N 32°34′42″E

Deposit Protection Fund of Uganda

Agency overview
- Formed: 1 July 1994; 32 years ago
- Jurisdiction: Uganda
- Headquarters: AHA Towers; Kampala, Uganda
- Agency executives: Ben Patrick Kagoro, chairman; Julia Clare Oyet, chief executive officer
- Parent agency: Uganda Ministry of Finance, Planning and Economic Development

The Uganda Deposit Protection Fund, officially the Deposit Protection Fund of Uganda (DPF), is a Ugandan government agency that provides deposit insurance to depositors in licensed Ugandan commercial banks, credit institutions and microfinance deposit-taking institutions. The DPF was created in July 1994. The law was amended in 2004 to create an independent agency, separate from the Bank of Uganda.

== Location ==
The headquarters of DPF are located on AHA Towers Plot 7 Lourdel Road, in Kampala, the capital and largest city of Uganda. The coordinates of the DPF headquarters are 00°19'53.0"N, 32°34'42.0"E (Latitude:0.331389; Longitude:32.578333).

== Overview ==
As of 31 December 2015, BoU administered the fund and held UGX 312.8 billion belonging to DPF. The bank held another UGX 9.6 billion belonging to the Uganda Microfinance Deposit Protection Fund (UMDPF), which the bank also administered.

Legislation passed in 2016 provided for the merging of the DPF and the UMDPF, with the new agency being separate from the BoU. The World Bank assisted with the process of separating the functions of the new agency from those of the BoU.

In February 2022, the Daily Monitor reported that the DPF had total assets of UGX 966 billion (approx. US$275.5 million), as of 30 June 2021. At that time, the total assets of Uganda's banking sector were UGX 39.7 trillion (approx. US$11.3 billion), with total customer deposits of UGX 31 trillion (approx. US$8.84 billion), in 19.1 million customer accounts. As of June 2024, DPF's total assets amounted to UGX 1,620 billion.

== Operations ==
The DPF is funded by premiums charged to every licensed deposit-taking financial institution in the country. Each account is protected up to UGX 10 million. The law provides for all depositors to be paid within 90 days of a bank failure and that the failing institution must be sold by auctioning its assets within six months of its seizure by BoU. If BoU determines that the failed institution will fetch a better economic return if sold as a whole, then it will re-open under new ownership and management, provided the new owners and managers meet the approval of BoU.

In September 2019, Uganda's Finance Ministry increased the amount of protected deposits from UGX 3 million to UGX 10 million. As of that date, the Fund covered deposits in 34 contributing financial institutions, including 24 commercial banks, five credit institutions and five micro finance deposit-taking institutions. As of May 2025, the Fund covered 31 contributing Institutions including 22 commercial banks, 7 credit institutions and 2 micro-finance deposit-taking institutions.

== History ==
Following the collapse of Teefe Bank in 1993, the BoU lost money when it was forced to reimburse depositors from its own coffers. In July 1994, the BoU established the fund as a department of the bank, with three objectives:

1. Protect small depositors from losing their savings if and when banks failed
2. Maintain the stability of Uganda's financial sector and payments system, and
3. Enhance public confidence in the banking system and the financial sector of the country.

The 2004 Financial Institutions Act provided for the formation of the DPF.

== See also ==
- Banking in Uganda
