= Hezi Bezalel =

Israeli businessman

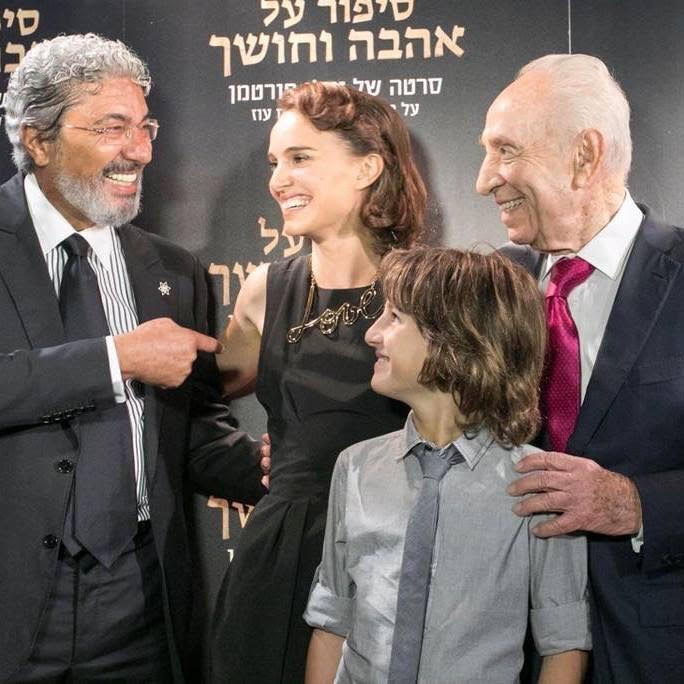
Hezi Bezalel (leftmost)

Hezi Bezalel (Hebrew: חזי בצלאל; born 1951) is an Israeli businessman. He is active mostly in Israel, the US, Britain, India, and various countries in Africa. He serves as the Honorary Consul of Rwanda in Israel.

== Biography ==
Bezalel was born in Basra, Iraq and moved with his family to Israel when he was 5 years old. The family settled in the Or Yehuda Absorption Camp, and later on moved to Ramat Gan. During his military service, he served as a tank commander in the Yom Kippur War. He later began his Economics studies at the Tel Aviv University. Following the completion of his M.A in Economics, he began teaching at the Tel Aviv University as well as the Ben Gurion University in Be'er Sheva. He worked as Prof. Haim Ben Shachar's teaching assistant and initiated his PhD studies in London.

He moved from Israel to Kenya in the 1980s, where he established an investment bank in Nairobi, on behalf of a British investment group. In Africa, he became involved in investment banking, project implementation and financing and other businesses. He developed personal relationships with various stakeholders in Africa, such as the President of Rwanda, Paul Kagame, Ugandan President Yoweri Moseveni, who conducted a large scale economic liberalization process in the country, supported by the World Bank.

In 1995, he purchased the failed Ugandan investment bank Nile Bank Limited, transforming it to a successful and lucrative institution. The Nile Bank was sold to Barclays in 2006, gaining a large profit for Bezalel who was the main shareholder of the bank.

Bezalel is the founder and managing partner of The Marathon Group, an international investment group, that deals mainly in investment banking and international trade. The Group deals with projects in telecommunications, energy, infrastructure, agriculture and technology. It holds permanent offices and branches in the UK, US, South Africa, Rwanda, Kenya, Uganda, India, Ethiopia and other countries in Africa and Asia. Bezalel is the founder and owner of Carnie Capital, a global investment group based in Israel, operating in over 30 countries globally.

Bezalel is a close and personal friend of Rwandan President, Paul Kagame. A story published in the Israeli Maariv, it is noted that "...Bezalel is considered an entrance gate for Israeli companies interested in working in Rwanda, and in getting in touch with the local government..."

In 2010, he acquired the Israeli Telecom company Xfone 018. In January 2015, the company won a government tender to become Israel's 6th Cellular service provider. In 2016, it was announced that 018-Xphone will partner with local cellular provider Cellcom (Israel) to provide its cellular service in Israel.

In early 2016, it was announced that Bezalel is leading a $300M investment fund in African businesses, together with the UK based Duet Group.

He established the UAV and sensor technology company Meteor Aerospace together with Itzhak Nissan, the former CEO of Israel Aerospace Industries.

Bezalel previously served as the Honorary Consul of Uganda and during the last decade as the Honorary Consul of Rwanda in Israel. He also serves as the chairperson of the Israel-Ethiopia Friendship Organization. He is the chairman of Mountaintop Productions, an Israeli-American international film production company, founded in 2010.

Bezalel currently resides in Israel.
