= Yako Bank Uganda Limited =

Tier II credit institution in Uganda

Coordinates: 00°19′39.5″N 32°36′21″E

- Company type: Private
- Industry: Financial services
- Founded: 2010; 16 years ago
- Headquarters: Forest Mall; Lugogo Bypass Road; Kampala, Uganda
- Key people: Om Parkash Khatkar (Managing Director); Kariuki Maina (Executive Director)
- Products: Loans, Savings, Investments, Forex Exchange
- Number of employees: 66 (2025)
- Website: Homepage

Yako Bank Uganda Limited, also Yako Bank, is a Tier II credit institution in Uganda that is licensed by the Bank of Uganda, the central bank and national banking regulator.

== Location ==
The headquarters and main branch of Yako Bank are located at Forest Mall, Lugogo Bypass Road, Kampala, approximately 5 kilometres (3 mi). east of the city's central business district.

== Overview ==
The bank is one of the smaller credit institutions in the country. As of 31 December 2021, the bank had a cost-to-profit ratio of 16.76 percent. At that time, all licensed financial institutions in the country had ratios ranging from a low of 10.71 percent to a high of 23.35 percent.

== History ==
Yako Bank was incorporated in 2010. It began offering services as a deposit-taking microfinance institution in September 2015, under the name Yako Microfinance Uganda Limited. In 2020, the institution received a Tier II credit bank license from the Bank of Uganda. The institution rebranded to Yako Bank Uganda Limited. Under its license, it is allowed to offer savings accounts, but not checking ones. It is allowed to make collateralized and non-collateralized loans to customers with or without savings accounts at the institution. Yako Bank, on account of being a credit institution, is prohibited from dealing with foreign exchange.

== Ownership ==
The institution is owned by private investors.

== Branch network ==
As of June 2024, Yako Bank Uganda Limited maintained branches at the following locations:

1. Main Branch: Forest Mall, Lugogo Bypass Road, Kampala
2. Parliament Avenue Branch: Parliament Avenue, Kampala
3. Jinja Branch: Main Street, Jinja.
4. 6th Street Industrial Area Branch

== Other considerations ==
In 2021 Yako Bank partnered with Uganda Green Enterprise Finance Accelerator (UGEFA), to participate in a pipeline of US$6.1 million in funding to over 200 UGEFA-trained businesses involved in the green economy, during the subsequent two years. Yako Bank is one of the participating Ugandan financial institutions. UGEFA is fully funded by the European Union.

== See also ==
- List of licensed credit institutions in Uganda
- Banking in Uganda
