= BRAC Uganda Bank Limited =

Ugandan micro-finance bank

Coordinates: 00°17′53″N 32°35′45″E

- Type: Private
- Industry: Financial services
- Founded: 2006; 20 years ago
- Key people: CPA Irene Mwoyogwona (CEO)
- Products: Loans, savings, ATM, mobile banking
- Total assets: US$55.677 million (USh202.223 billion) (2017)
- Number of employees: 312 (2017)
- Website: www.bracugandabankltd.com

BRAC Uganda Bank Limited (BUBL), is a credit institution (′Tier II Financial Institution′) in Uganda. In April 2019, the institution received a Tier II Financial Institution Licence, which authorized it to operate as a bank, supervised by the Bank of Uganda, the national banking regulator.

== Location ==
BRAC Uganda Bank Limited maintains headquarters at 880 Heritage Road, in the Nsambya neighborhood, in the Makindye Division, of Kampala, Uganda's capital and largest city. The coordinates of the bank's headquarters are 0°17'53.0"N, 32°35'45.0"E (Latitude:0.298056; Longitude:32.595833).

== Overview ==
BRAC Uganda Bank Limited is a Tier II Financial Institution (MFI), licensed by the Bank of Uganda, the central bank and national banking regulator. As a credit institution, it is not authorized to offer checking accounts or deal in foreign exchange. The company is authorized to take in customer deposits and to establish savings accounts. It is also authorized make collateralized and non-collateralized loans to savings and non savings customers. The company is a wholly owned subsidiary of BRAC International and is a member of their network. As of December 2017, the institution's total assets were valued at US$55.677 million (USh202.223 billion), with shareholder's equity of US$30.056 million (USh109.164 billion).

== History ==
The institution was established in Uganda in 2006, as BRAC Microfinance Limited, with the objective of expanding financial inclusion in the country and serving the rural poor, specially women. At the time it acquired Tier II banking status in April 2019, the bank served over 270,000 customers in at least 80 of Uganda's 136 districts.

== Ownership ==
BRAC Uganda Bank Limited, is a member of the international non-governmental development organisation, headquartered in Dhaka, Bangladesh, with subsidiaries in Afghanistan, Liberia, Myanmar, Nepal, Philippines, Sierra Leone, South Sudan, Tanzania and Uganda. BRAC Uganda is the second subsidiary to attain banking status, after the home subsidiary in Bangladesh.

== Branch network ==
As of January 2021, BRAC Uganda maintained 163 branches across 84 districts in Uganda. Of these, 32 are fully networked branches regulated by the Bank of Uganda. The remaining 131 are satellite offices supporting outreach activities of the Bank.

== See also ==
- Banking in Uganda
- List of banks in Uganda
