= Itzhak Nissan =

Israeli engineer and business executive

- יצחק ניסן
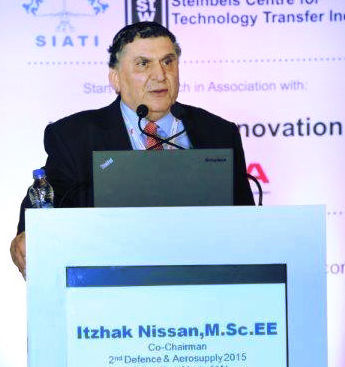
- Itzhak Nissan, CEO of Meteor Aerospace Ltd., addressing Aerosupply India 2015 as co-chairman
- Education: B.Sc. in Electronics and Radar Engineering, University of Washington; M.Sc. in Electronics and Radar Engineering, University of Washington
- Occupations: Chairman and CEO of Meteor Aerospace Ltd.
- Known for: Former President and CEO of Israel Aerospace Industries (IAI)

Itzhak Nissan (Hebrew: יצחק ניסן) is an Israeli engineer and business executive who is the chairman and CEO of Meteor Aerospace Ltd., a privately owned Israeli defense and security company that Nissan founded.

== Formal education ==
Nissan holds B.Sc. and M.Sc. degrees in Electronics and Radar Engineering, both with honours, from the University of Washington in Seattle.

== Career at Israel Aerospace Industries (IAI) ==
Nissan joined Israel Aerospace Industries Ltd. in 1978 as a systems engineer. Nissan's notable accomplishments included conception and development of a leading weapon system for the Israeli Navy and initiation of special programs in cooperation with other countries.

In 1995, Nissan was appointed as general manager of IAI's MBT Division, which was IAI's engineering and development house for missiles, precision weapons, naval systems, and leader of all of Israel's space programs.

In 2002, Nissan was appointed as corporate vice president and general manager of IAI's Systems Missiles and Space Group.

In January 2006, Nissan was appointed as president and chief executive officer of IAI. Nissan led major changes in the company's culture and business orientation, adjusting its workforce structure and introducing the company to the Tel-Aviv stock market with bonds issuing.

Globes business newspaper described Nissan as “a respected manager credited with winning huge deals for IAI”. Nissan left IAI with an all-time high record of orders backlog, totalling nearly $10 billion.

== Chairman and CEO at Meteor Aerospace Ltd. ==
In 2013, Nissan and Hezi Bezalel founded a privately owned defense and Home Land Security (HLS) company – Meteor Aerospace Ltd. Meteor Aerospace develops and manufactures a range of weapons, and it develops new unmanned systems for air, ground and sea.

Meteor has developed unmanned aerial vehicle (UAV) systems, manned or unmanned surface vessels (USV), and robotic ground vehicles.

== Honours and awards ==
- 2001 – Award for Extraordinary Achievements from Manufacturers Association of Israel
- 2008 – High Tech Manager of the Year award from Israel Management Association
- 2009 – Selected by D&B as one of the most prominent Israeli business leaders
- 2012 – Honorary Doctorate from the Technion
