= Ibrahim Kironde Kabanda =

Ugandan Businessman

- Born: Uganda
- Citizenship: Uganda
- Occupations: Businessman and entrepreneur
- Title: Former chairman Uganda Revenue Authority

Ibrahim Kironde Kabanda, is a businessman and entrepreneur in Uganda. He is a former chairman of the Uganda Revenue Authority, having served in that position from 2004 until 2010.

== Work ==
In 2013, Muwenda Mutebi II, the reigning Kabaka of Buganda, gave power-of-attorney to three individuals, including Kabanda, to prosecute the National Water and Sewerage Corporation for constructing a sewerage treatment plant on his land in Lubigi, without his permission. The other two individuals were Buganda Prince Daudi Kintu Wasajja and Godfrey Kaaya Kavuma.

In 2015, Kabanda was the second largest non-institutional investor in the stock of Stanbic Bank (Uganda) Limited, with shareholding valued at UGX:6.7 billion.
