= Mumba Kalifungwa =

Zambian accountant, banker and corporate executive

- Born: Zambia
- Citizenship: Zambia
- Occupations: Banker and Corporate Executive
- Years active: since 1996
- Known for: Professional competence
- Title: Chief Executive Officer of Stanbic Bank Uganda Limited

Kenneth Mumba Kalifungwa, is a Zambian accountant and corporate executive who is the chief executive officer of Stanbic Bank Uganda Limited since 1 March 2025.

Before that, from 1 April 2020 until 28 February 2025, he was the CEO and managing director of Absa Bank Uganda Limited, another commercial bank in Uganda.

== Background and education ==
He was born in Zambia. He attended local primary and secondary schools, before being admitted to university for his bachelor's degree. His second degree, a Master of Business Administration, was obtained from Heriot-Watt University Business School, in Edinburgh, Scotland, United Kingdom. Kalifungwa is also a Chartered Certified Accountant, recognised by the Association of Chartered Certified Accountants. In addition, he has taken courses in banking and management over the duration of his career.

== Career ==
At the time he was appointed CEO of Absa Bank Uganda, Kalifungwa was the chief financial officer (CFO) at Absa Bank Botswana Limited, a position he served in since 2015. Before that, he served as the CFO at then Barclays Bank of Zambia (now Absa Bank Zambia). His banking career goes back to 1995. He started out at Coopers and Lybrand which today is PricewaterhouseCoopers. Later, he joined the Zambia Revenue Authority, serving there as senior accountant. He then joined Absa Bank Zambia.

On 1 April 2020, Kalifungwa replaced Nazim Mahmood, who held the CEO position at Absa Bank Uganda, in acting capacity since July 2019. On 1 March 2025 he replaced Samuel Mwogeza at Stanbic Bank Uganda Limited, who was the acting chief executive since 1 April 2024.

== Professional associations and societies ==
Mumba Kalifungwa is a fellow of the Chartered Institute of Management Accountants, the Association of Chartered Certified Accountants, the Botswana Institute of Chartered Accountants and the Zambia Institute of Chartered Accountants. As of March 2020, he was a board member of the Chartered Institute of Management Accountants (CIMA) Africa Board. He previously served as chairman of the board audit committee of the Zambia Institute of Mass Communication.

== See also ==
- Absa Group
- List of banks in Uganda
