= National Bank of Kenya =

Commercial bank in Kenya

- Type: Private: Subsidiary of Access Bank plc
- Industry: Financial services
- Founded: 1968; 58 years ago
- Headquarters: Nairobi, Kenya
- Key people: George Odhiambo (managing director)
- Products: Loans, savings, checking, investments, debit cards, credit cards
- Revenue: ▲ Aftertax:US$1,521,950 (KES:156,139,000) (2018)
- Total assets: US$1.122 billion (KES:115.143 billion) (2018)
- Number of employees: 1,356 (2018)
- Website: nationalbank.co.ke

National Bank of Kenya (NBK), also known as National Bank, is a commercial bank in Kenya, the largest economy in the East African Community. It is licensed by the Central Bank of Kenya, the central bank, and national banking regulator. Effective 30 May 2025, the bank is a wholly owned subsidiary of the Access Bank Plc.

== Overview ==
NBK is a large financial services provider in Kenya, serving individuals, small-to-medium companies and businesses (SMEs) and large corporations. Headquartered in Nairobi, the bank owns one subsidiary company: NatBank Trustee and Investment Services Limited. As of December 2018, National Bank of Kenya's asset base was valued at approximately US$1.122 billion (KES:115.143 billion), with shareholders' equity valued at about US$67.6 million (KES:6.936 billion). Following the acquisition of the shares of NBK by KCB Group in September 2019, the shares of NBK were de-listed from the Nairobi Securities Exchange on 16 September 2019.

== History ==
The bank was established in 1968 as a 100 percent government-owned financial institution. In 1994, the Kenyan Government reduced its shareholding to 68 percent by selling 32 percent shareholding to the public. The government further divested from NBK over the years, until its present shareholding of 22.5 percent, as of April 2019. Following 12 years of poor financial performance, the bank became profitable again in 2010, paying out an annual dividend ever since.

In April 2019, KCB Bank Kenya Limited, the largest commercial bank in the country by assets, announced its intention to acquire 100 percent of the assets and liabilities of National Bank of Kenya, pending shareholder and regulatory approvals. That acquisition was concluded on 16 September 2019.

== Subsidiaries ==
The bank owns the following subsidiary companies in which it has 100% shareholding:

- Natbank Trustee and Investment Services Limited: Nairobi, (Kenya)
- Kenya National Capital Corporation Limited: Nairobi,
- NBK Insurance Agency Limited: Nairobi, (Kenya)

== Ownership ==
As of October 2019, the stock of National Bank of Kenya was owned by the Kenya Commercial Bank Group, a large financial conglomerate, with subsidiaries in seven Eastern African countries and total assets of over $7.013 billion, as of October 2019.

At the time of acquisition of NBK, KCB Group stated that it intended to run NBK as a stand-alone subsidiary, for a period of at least two years, after which NBK would be integrated with KCB Bank Kenya Limited.

On 20 March 2024, it was announced that Access Bank Plc, a Nigerian commercial bank, had entered into an agreement to acquire NBK, subject to receipt of approvals from the Central Bank of Kenya and the Central Bank of Nigeria. The acquisition process by Access Bank Group was concluded on 30 May 2025.

== Governance ==
As of March 2024, the following were the board members:

- Jones Makau Nzomo: non-executive director
- Paul Russo: KCB Group CEO & managing director
- Lina Githuka: non-executive director
- Laban Omangi: non-executive director
- Geoffrey Malombe: non-executive director
- George Odhiambo: managing director
- Samuel Mundia: director, legal services

== See also ==
- Central Bank of Kenya
- Economy of Kenya
- List of banks in Kenya
