= Julia Clare Oyet =

Ugandan accountant and corporate executive (born c. 1970)

Julia Clare Olima Oyet
- Born: c. 1972 (age 53–54); Uganda
- Education: Uganda Martyrs University; Heriot-Watt University; Association of Chartered Certified Accountants
- Occupations: Accountant, central banker and corporate executive
- Years active: 1995 — present
- Title: Chief Executive Officer of Uganda Deposit Protection Fund

Julia Clare Olima Oyet is an accountant, central banker and corporate executive in Uganda. She is the chief executive officer of the Uganda Deposit Protection Fund (UDPF), the semi-independent government agency that insures a portion of customers' bank deposits (up to UGX:10 million or approx. US$2,850). She was appointed to that position in 2017, on secondment from the Bank of Uganda, the country's central bank and national banking regulator.

== Background and education ==
Oyet was born in Uganda in the 1970s. She obtained her first degree, a Bachelor of Business Administration (BBA), from the Uganda Martyrs University, in Nkozi, Uganda. Her second degree, a Master of Business Administration (MBA), was obtained from Heriot-Watt University Business School, in Edinburgh, Scotland, United Kingdom. As of February 2022, she was enrolled in the Doctor of Philosophy in Business Administration at Heriot-Watt University, focusing on financial inclusion. In addition, she is a Fellow of the Association of Chartered Certified Accountants, of the United Kingdom.

== Work experience ==
As of February 2022, Oyet was an experienced accountant, central banker and bank supervisor, who had worked in Uganda's central bank, both as an accountant and as an internal auditor. Her work at the Bank of Uganda spanned over 20 years, as of 2022.

In her position as CEO of the DPF, Oyet is the first person and first woman to serve in that role, since the agency was created in 2017.

== Other considerations ==
As of February 2022, Oyet was the "Secretary to the African Regional Committee (ARC) of the International Association of Deposit Insurers (IADI)".
