= Oyetunde =

Oyetune
- Language: Yoruba

Origin
- Region of origin: West Africa

Oyetunde is Yoruba given name and surname. Notable people with the surname include:

Given name

- Mudasiru Oyetunde Hussein, Nigerian politician and member of the Nigerian House of Representatives (1999-2007)

Surname

- Adenike Oyetunde, media personality
- Kehinde Oyetunde, Nigerian political and human rights activist
