= African Alliance Investment Bank =

Investment banking group

Coordinates: 26°07′47″S 28°04′12″E

- Type: Private
- Industry: Investments, financial services, brokerage
- Founded: 1992; 34 years ago
- Founder: Antonio de Castro
- Headquarters: Johannesburg, South Africa
- Area served: Africa
- Key people: Antonio de Castro, executive director
- Products: Asset management, Brokerage services, investment banking, investment management, unit trusts, Advisory and Research
- Website: Homepage

African Alliance Investment Bank (AAIB) is "an investment banking group" operating in Africa.

== Location ==
The group's headquarters are located in neighborhood of Melrose, in the city of Johannesburg, South Africa, approximately 11 kilometres (7 mi), north of the city center. The coordinates of the group's headquarters are:26°07'47.0"S, 28°04'12.0"E (Latitude:-26.129737; Longitude:28.070007).

== Markets ==
As of March 2016, AAIB operates subsidiaries in the following markets:

1. Egypt
2. Tunisia
3. Morocco
4. Senegal
5. Guinea Bissau
6. Mali
7. Niger
8. Ivory Coast
9. Burkina Faso
10. Ghana
11. Benin
12. Togo
13. Nigeria
14. DR Congo
15. Uganda
16. Kenya
17. Rwanda
18. Mauritius
19. Malawi
20. Angola
21. Botswana
22. Namibia
23. Lesotho
24. Zambia
25. Zimbabwe
26. Eswatini
27. South Africa

== Operations ==
In each of the markets that the bank serves, there is a locally registered subsidiary chaired by a non-executive chairman, an executive director, an executive committee, a risk committee, an audit committee, an internal auditor, a remuneration committee, a deal committee and a technical advisory committee.

The group engages in the following activities:

1. Brokerage services
2. Financial research
3. Wealth management
4. Corporate finance
5. Private Equity
6. Third-party administration

== See also ==
- Nairobi Securities Exchange
- Uganda Securities Exchange
- Rwanda Stock Exchange
- List of investment banks in Uganda
- List of investment banks in Kenya
