= UGAFODE Microfinance Limited =

Ugandan financial services company

UGAFODE Microfinance Limited (MDI)
- Company type: Private company
- Industry: Financial services
- Founded: 1994; 32 years ago
- Headquarters: Kampala, Uganda
- Key people: Ms. Ruth Doreen Mutebe Nseko chairperson Shafi Nambobi chief executive officer
- Products: Loans, savings, money transfer services, financial literacy training
- Total assets: US$36.623 million (UGX:130.914 billion) (Oct 2024)
- Number of employees: 330 (October 2024)
- Website: www.ugafode.co.ug

UGAFODE Microfinance Limited (MDI), commonly known as UGAFODE, is a microfinance institution in Uganda. It is registered and licensed as microfinance deposit-taking institution (MDI) by the Bank of Uganda, the Central Bank and national banking regulator. UGAFODE was the fourth MDI registered in Uganda.

== History ==
UGAFODE was founded in 1994 as the Uganda Agency for Development Limited, a non-governmental organization whose primary objective was to provide affordable financial services to its customers. In September 2010, in preparation to become an MDI, UGAFODE Microfinance Limited was incorporated as a limited company.

In 2011, the institution accepted eight new shareholders, including Ezra Suruma, Uganda minister of finance from 2005 until 2009 and senior adviser for finance and planning to the President of Uganda. Suruma also had an ownership interest in the National Bank of Commerce (Uganda), a Tier I commercial bank, which was closed in 2012.

An application was made to the Bank of Uganda for the issuance of an MDI banking license. In October 2011, a Tier III MDI licence was granted, and MDI operations began on 10 October 2011.

As of March 2014, the institution's total assets were about US$10.07 million (UGX:25.34 billion), with shareholders' equity of about US$2.25 million (UGX:5.66 billion).

== Branch network ==
As of October 2024, the institution maintained branches at the following locations, arranged alphabetically:

1. Bombo Road Branch/ SME Suite - Silva Arcade, 62 Bombo Road, Kampala Head Office
2. Ibanda Branch - Adam's Building, Main Street, Ibanda
3. Ishaka Branch - 33 Rukungiri Road, Ishaka
4. Jinja Branch - Jinja
5. Kagadi Branch - 241-242 Isunga Road, Kagadi
6. Kyarushesha Branch - Kikuube
7. Kyotera Branch - 184-753 Mutukula Road, Kyotera
8. Lira Branch - Plot 8A, Soroti Road, Lira
9. Lyantonde Branch - 215-76 Main Street, Lyantonde
10. Mbale Branch - Mbale
11. Mbarara Branch - 23 Bananuka Drive, Mbarara
12. Mpigi Branch - Continental House, Mpigi
13. Nakasero Branch - Nakasero, Kampala
14. Nansana Branch - 11/13 Nansana, Wakiso
15. Ntungamo Branch - 69A Kabale Road, Ntungamo
16. Rubaga Road Branch - 22 Namirembe Road, Kampala
17. Rukungiri Branch - 5 Rubabo Road, Rukungiri
18. Rushere Branch - Kiruhura
19. Sembabule Branch - Sembabule
20. Lira Branch - Plot 8A Soroti Road, Lira, Lira
21. Nakivale Refugees settlement Branch, Isingiro

Sales and customer service centres

1. Kitagwenda Sales and Customer Service Centre, Kitagwenda
2. Kyangwali Sales and Customer Service Centre, Kikuube
3. Rubaale Sales and Customer Service Centre, Ntungamo
4. Rubondo Sales and Customer Service Centre, Isingiro

== See also ==
- Banking in Uganda
- List of banks in Uganda
- Pride Microfinance Limited
- FINCA Uganda Limited
- Finance Trust Bank
