= Uganda Commercial Bank =

Uganda Commercial Bank Ltd
- Company type: Government-owned corporation
- Industry: Banking
- Founded: 1965
- Defunct: 2001
- Fate: Acquired by Standard Bank, merged into Stanbic Bank (Uganda) Limited
- Headquarters: Principal Office; Kampala, Uganda
- Products: Loans, Savings, Consumer Banking etc.

Uganda Commercial Bank Ltd (UCB/UCBL) was a Ugandan government-owned bank, and the largest financial institution in the country. In 2001 the bank was privatised and merged into Stanbic Bank (Uganda) Limited.

== History ==
Uganda Commercial Bank (UCB) was established by an Act of Parliament, "The Uganda Commercial Bank Act, 1965". The new bank was to replace the Uganda Credit and Savings Bank.

The bank extended banking services to rural areas, and steadily expanded its branch network throughout the 1960s and 1970s. In 1971/72, following the nationalisation of foreign-owned businesses by the government of Idi Amin, the bank's branch network expanded rapidly when it took over most of the branches of foreign-owned banks - leaving Uganda Commercial Bank with nearly a monopoly in banking markets outside Kampala. The fall of Amin's government in 1979 brought a revival of foreign development assistance to Uganda, some of which was channelled through Uganda Commercial Bank, leading to an increase in its share of medium-term financing and its loan portfolio. The bank's branches were also used to perform functions for the government, such as the handling of payments of taxes and school fees.

In the late 1980s, then chairman and managing director Dr. Frank Alfred Mwine led the bank in opening 130 new branches and further expanding its investments. Dr. Mwine was a Harvard Law educated Ugandan and a World Bank executive. By the 1990s UCB held around 50% of commercial bank deposits and had 190 of the 270 bank branches in the country. The second largest branch network at that time, the Co-operative Bank, had 24 branches.

== Sale and merger ==
In the late 1980s and early 1990s, the government of Uganda adopted private sector development (PSD) policies and decided to divest itself of the majority of government-owned corporations.

In 1997, an agreement to sale 51% stakes in Uganda Commercial Bank was concluded with the Malaysian industrial conglomerate Westmont Land Asia Bhd. However, in 1998, after Westmont failed to pay the agreed fee and was accused of acting fraudulently, the transaction was nullified. In 2001, 80% shares of the bank was bought by the South African investment bank Standard Bank. Standard Bank merged Uganda Commercial Bank with its existing bank Stanbic Bank Uganda Limited.
