= Nile Bank Limited =

Defunct Ugandan private bank

- Type: Private commercial bank
- Industry: Financial services
- Founded: 1988
- Defunct: 2007
- Fate: Acquired by Barclays Bank
- Successor: Barclays Bank Uganda (now Absa Bank Uganda)
- Headquarters: Kampala, Uganda
- Number of locations: 18 branches (2005)
- Area served: Uganda
- Key people: Hezi Bezalel (major shareholder)
- Products: Commercial banking, consumer banking, Savings accounts, loans, foreign exchange, money transfers
- Services: Banking services, credit facilities, foreign exchange, Western Union services
- Owner: Shareholders from Uganda, Israel, South Africa

Nile Bank Ltd was a private bank registered in Uganda, with shareholders from Uganda, Israel, and South Africa. Nile Bank has an emphasis on consumer banking.

== History ==
Nile Bank was established in 1988 for the purposes of providing banking services to the public at a time when low cost banking was almost non-existent in Uganda. By 1992 the bank had two branches and has since expanded to six branches including branches in Mbarara, Entebbe and Jinja. The bank has around 90,000 customers and in January 2003, Nile Bank became one of the first Ugandan banks to receive ISO certification.

In June 2007 Nile Bank was purchased by Barclays bank. Barclays decided to merge the two client-bases and do an IT systems upgrade at the same time.

In June 2007, 100% of Nile Bank Limited was acquired by Barclays Bank from the main shareholder, Israeli businessman Hezi Bezalel, and became part of Barclays Bank (Uganda) Limited.

== See also ==
- Barclays Bank (Uganda)
- Banking in Uganda
- Economy of Uganda
