= Absa Bank Uganda Limited =

Commercial bank in Uganda

Coordinates: 00°19′14.5″N 32°35′12″E

- Type: Subsidiary
- Industry: Financial services
- Founded: 1927; 99 years ago
- Headquarters: Kampala, Uganda
- Key people: Keith Kalyegira (chairperson); David Wandera (managing director and CEO)
- Products: Loans, checking, savings, investments, debit cards
- Revenue: ▲ Aftertax:UGX:222.4 billion (US$59.8 million) (2025)
- Total assets: UGX:7.03 trillion (US$1.89 billion) (2025)
- Number of employees: 850+ (2014)
- Parent: Absa Group Limited
- Website: www.absa.co.ug

Absa Bank Uganda Limited, formerly known as Barclays Bank of Uganda Limited, is a commercial bank in Uganda. It is licensed by the Bank of Uganda, the country's central bank and national banking regulator. The bank is a subsidiary of Absa Group Limited, a financial services conglomerate, based in South Africa, with banking subsidiaries in 12 African countries and representative offices in two other African countries. Absa Bank Group, whose shares trade on the JSE Limited, was reported to have total assets in excess of US$91 billion, as of October 2019.

== Overview ==
The bank is primarily involved in meeting the banking needs of individuals, small and medium-sized businesses (SMEs), and large corporations. Before 2006, the bank focused on meeting the banking needs of only large corporations and high-net-worth individuals. That focus was loosened to include SMEs and regular customers. As of December 2025, the bank's total assets were valued at UGX:7.03 trillion (US$1.89 billion) As of December 2023, At 31 December 2021, shareholders' equity was valued at UGX:521.956 billion (US$148 million). That year, the bank's after-tax profit was USh:110 billion (US$31.2 million). As of 31 December 2019, Absa Bank Uganda was the third-largest commercial bank in the country, by assets. As of December 2022, Absa Bank Uganda has assets valued at USh4.23 trillion (approx. US$1.143 billion), accounting for 9.31 per cent of total banking assets in the country at that time.

== History ==
The bank opened in 1927, with two branches in the capital city, Kampala, and one in Jinja, the country's second-largest commercial centre, at that time. In 1969, the bank acquired the Ugandan business of the Commercial Bank of Africa. In February 2007, the bank completed its acquisition of Nile Bank Uganda Limited, strengthening its presence in the country.

== Ownership ==
In 1969, the bank's stock was 51 per cent held by Barclays and 49 per cent held by the government of Uganda. By 2001, the bank had become a wholly owned subsidiary of Barclays. Since March 2016, the bank has been wholly owned by the Barclays Africa Group. With the re-branding of Barclays Africa Group, in 2018, Absa Bank Uganda is a 100 per cent subsidiary of Absa Group Limited.

== Branch network ==
The bank's headquarters is at 2 Hannington Road, on Nakasero Hill, in Kampala. As of July 2013, the bank maintained branches at the following locations:

1. Bugoloobi Branch – 128 Spring Road, Bugoloobi, Kampala
2. Hannington Road Branch – 2 Hannington Road, Nakasero, Kampala Main Branch
3. Premier Banking Branch – Hannington Road at Shimoni Road, Nakasero, Kampala
4. Garden City Prestige Centre – Garden City, Yusuf Lule Road, Kampala
5. Kampala Road Branch – 16 Kampala Road, Kampala
6. Kansanga Branch – 529 Ggaba Road, Kansanga, Kampala
7. Kawempe Branch – Katongole Building, 2522 Masindi Highway, Kawempe, Kampala
8. Kireka Branch – 174 Kampala-Jinja Highway, Kireka
9. Lubowa Branch – Quality Hill Shopping Complex, 1621 Lubowa Estate, Lubowa
10. Lugazi Branch – 121 Kampala Road, Lugazi
11. Lugogo Branch – 2–8 Lugogo Bypass Road, Lugogo
12. Luwuum Street Branch – Luwum Street, Kampala
13. Nakawa Branch – URA Customs Building, 1–3, Sebei Lane, Nakawa, Kampala
14. Naakulabye Branch – 1254 City Petrol Station, Makerere Hill Road, Naakulabye
15. Ndeeba Branch – 479 Masaka Road, Ndeeba, Kampala
16. Ntinda Branch – Ntinda Shopping Mall, Kimera Road, Ntinda, Kampala
17. Ovino Market Branch – Ovino Market, Kampala
18. Parliament Ave Branch – IPS Building, 14 Parliament Avenue, Kampala
19. Rwenzori Courts Branch – 1 Lumumba Avenue, Nakasero Hill, Kampala
20. Shauriyako Branch – 34–38 Nakivubo Road, Kampala
21. Tankhill Parade Branch – 2683 Kisugu-Muyenga Road, Muyenga, Kampala
22. UN Base Branch – United Nations Base, Entebbe
23. Wandegeya Branch – 170 Bombo Road, Wandegeya, Kampala
24. Abaita Ababiri Branch – Entebbe-Kampala Road, Abayita Ababiri
25. Kitoro Branch – Kitoro, Entebbe
26. Masaka Branch – 2 Broadway Street, Masaka
27. Mukono Branch – Best Meals Building, Mukono
28. Busia Border Branch – Busia Customs Yard, Busia
29. Iganga Branch – 85 Main Street, Iganga
30. Jinja Branch – 81 Main Street, Jinja
31. Mbale Branch – Republic Street, Mbale
32. Soroti Branch – 40 Gweri Road, Soroti
33. Tororo Branch – 4 Mbale Road, Tororo
34. Arua Branch – 1D Transport Road, Arua
35. Gulu Branch – 32 Gulu Avenue, Gulu
36. Lira Branch – 10 Soroti Road, Lira
37. Fort Portal Branch – 14 Bwamba Road, Fort Portal
38. Hoima Branch – 56 Main Street, Hoima
39. Ishaka Branch – Ishaka
40. Kabale Branch – 190 Main Street, Kabale
41. Kasese Branch – 68 Rwenzori Road, Kasese
42. Masindi Branch – 77 Port Road, Masindi
43. Mbarara Branch – 66 High Street, Mbarara

== Name change ==
Beginning in August 2019, Barclays Bank of Uganda began re-branding to Absa Bank Uganda Limited. The process concluded on 11 November 2019, when the legal and business names of the bank changed to Absa Bank Uganda Limited.

== Governance ==
The bank is governed by a board of directors. The chairman of the board is one of the non-executive directors. As of April 2025, the Chairperson was Keith Kalyegira. The CEO and managing director in acting capacity is David Wandera.

In March 2020, the Acting Chairperson was Nadine Byarugaba. She left in December 2024. From 1 April 2020 Mumba Kalifungwa began serving as the substantive managing director and CEO. He left in March 2025 and joined Stanbic Bank Uganda Limited as CEO.

Before that, the former managing director is Mian Nazim Mahmood. He was appointed in July 2019, as Interim CEO, while a substantive chief executive was being sought. Nazim holds a Bachelor of Business Administration degree, awarded by the University of Massachusetts, Amherst and a Master of Business Administration in Finance from Bentley College, in Waltham, Massachusetts, all in the United States. Before that Rakesh Jha served in that position. He holds an MBA in Marketing gained from IMED and a Bachelor of Arts (BA) degree gained from the University of Mumbai. Immediately prior to his appointment as managing director, Jha was managing director of Barclays Bank Seychelles.

As of March 2025, the members of the board are as listed in the table below.

Absa Bank Uganda board of directors
Rank	Member	Description	Position	Notes
1	Keith Kalyegira	non-executive director	Chairperson	
2	David Wandera	Executive Director	CEO & managing director	
3	Alex Rugamba	non-executive director	Member	
4	Sophie Nkuutu	non-executive director	Member	
5	Phillip Aliker	non-executive director	Member	
6	Ina De Vry	non-executive director	Member	
7	Michael Segwaya	Executive Director	chief financial officer	
8	Edward Ocen	company secretary	Member	
	Total	8		

== Innovation ==
In December 2021, Absa Bank Uganda was the first financial institution in the country to introduce ATM machines capable of accepting and dispensing cash, using smart mobile phones, without the presence of the traditional ATM card. The Absa Banking App generates a QR Code, which the customer scans on to the ATM screen and then allows the execution of the desired transaction.

== See also ==
- Banking in Uganda
- List of banks in Uganda
- Absa Group Limited
- Asset allocation among commercial banks in Uganda
