= Dyer & Blair Investment Bank =

Dyer & Blair Investment Bank Limited
- Company type: Private
- Industry: Investment; Financial services Brokerage
- Founded: 1954
- Founder: Messrs Derek Ingram Dyer, Patrick Murdoch Blair
- Headquarters: 7th Floor, Goodman Towers, Waiyaki Way; Nairobi, Kenya
- Area served: East Africa
- Key people: Chairman - Jimnah Mbaru, CEO - Paul Orem
- Products: Asset management, Brokerage service, investment banking, investment management, Unit trusts, Advisory and Research
- Website: www.dyerandblair.com

Dyer & Blair Investment Bank is a Kenyan investment firm that engages in regional investment banking, securities, investment management, and other financial services with both Individual and institutional clients. It is regulated by the Capital Markets Authority.

== History ==
Dyer & Blair Investment Bank was founded in Nairobi in 1954 as a partnership of Stockbrokers Hickman & Grey. In that year, it became one of the six founding members of the Nairobi Stock Exchange (NSE), established in the same year.

In 1956, Messrs Derek Ingram Dyer & Patrick Murdoch Blair took over ownership from Hickman & Grey and changed the firm's name to Dyer & Blair to represent the new ownership.

The Kenya Commercial Bank (KCB) acquired full ownership of Dyer & Blair partnership in 1973 and incorporated the partnership it into a limited liability company operating as a wholly owned subsidiary of the bank. This was in the aim of offering brokerage services to their clients.

In 1983, KCB sold its entire shareholding in Dyer & Blair to local investors including business man Jimnah Mbaru.

Dyer & Blair converted into a fully-fledged licensed investment bank in 2004.

== Markets ==
Dyer & Blair Operates in East Africa Through its whole owned subsidiaries in Kenya, Uganda and Rwanda. The Investment bank is a member of the NSE, USE and the RSE.

== Achievements ==
- Dyer & Blair won the tender to be the transaction adviser for the US$840 Million Safaricom IPO. This was to the largest offering in the Eastern Africa region.
- The firm was selected as the Sole adviser for the acquisition of a 24.99% stake by Investment Partners, a private equity firm, in Equity Bank Group of Kenya for US$179 Million. This was one of the largest mergers & acquisition transaction in the Eastern Africa region.
- Was the lead adviser for the Bralirwa IPO. This was the first IPO on the Rwanda Stock Exchange.
- Was the lead adviser for the NIC Insurance Uganda IPO. This was the first Insurance Company to list on the Uganda Stock Exchange.

== See also ==
- Nairobi Securities Exchange
- Uganda Securities Exchange
- Rwanda Stock Exchange
- List of investment banks in Kenya
- DFCU Group
