= ABC Bank (Kenya) =

Kenyan commercial bank

African Banking Corporation Limited
- Company type: Private
- Industry: Financial services
- Founded: 1981
- Headquarters: ABC Bank House, Woodvale Grove, Westlands, Nairobi, Kenya
- Key people: Richard Omwela (Chairman); Shamaz Savani (Group Managing Director); Sridhar Natarajan (Group CEO)
- Products: Credit facilities, savings, diaspora banking, investments, debit cards, forex and money markets, mortgages, money transfer services, mobile banking, Internet banking
- Number of employees: 300+
- Website: www.abcthebank.com

African Banking Corporation Limited (ABC Bank Kenya) is a Kenyan commercial bank, established in 1984.

In March 2017, ABC acquired the LEI certification from the London Stock Exchange.

== History ==
ABC Bank was started in 1981, as a financial institution named Consolidated Finance Company Limited.

Following 1994 legislation allowing financial institutions to convert into banks, Consolidated Finance Company transformed into African Banking Corporation Limited (ABC Bank) in 1995.

== Subsidiaries ==
ABC Bank (Kenya) owns the following subsidiaries, either in whole or in part:

1. ABC Capital Bank, Kampala, Uganda (Tier II credit institution)
2. ABC Capital Limited, Nairobi, Kenya (stock brokerage)
3. ABC Insurance Limited, Nairobi, Kenya (insurance brokerage)

== See also ==
- East African Community
- Central Bank of Kenya
- List of banks in Kenya
- Economy of Kenya
- ABC Bank (Uganda)
