= KCB Bank Tanzania Limited =

Commercial bank in Tanzania

KCB Bank Tanzania Limited, also KCB Bank Tanzania, is a commercial bank in Tanzania. It is one of the twenty-nine (29) banks licensed by the Bank of Tanzania, the country's banking regulator. The bank is a member of the Kenya Commercial Bank Group (KCB Group), headquartered in Nairobi, Kenya, with subsidiaries in Kenya, Rwanda, South Sudan, Tanzania and Uganda. As Of 2026, The Bank Has Over 17+ Branches

== Branch Network ==
- Head Office, Harambee Plaza, Dar Es Salaam
- Samora Branch, Dar Es Salaam
- Uhuru Branch, Dar Es Salaam
- Buguruni Branch, Dar Es Salaam
- Mlimani City Branch, Dar Es Salaam
- Mbagala Branch, Dar Es Salaam
- Msimbazi Branch, Dar Es Salaam
- Lumumba Branch, Dar Es Salaam
- Arusha Main Branch, Arusha
- Arusha PAPU Branch, Arusha
- Arusha EAC Mini Branch, Arusha
- Arusha TFA Service Center, Arusha
- Moshi Branch, Moshi, Kilimanjaro
- Mwanza Branch, Mwanza
- Zanzibar Branch, Zanzibar
- Kahama Branch, Kahama, Shinyanga
- Geita Branch, Geita
- Morogoro Branch, Morogoro
- Tunduma Branch, Tunduma
