= Stanbic Bank Uganda =

Commercial bank in Uganda

Stanbic Bank Uganda Limited
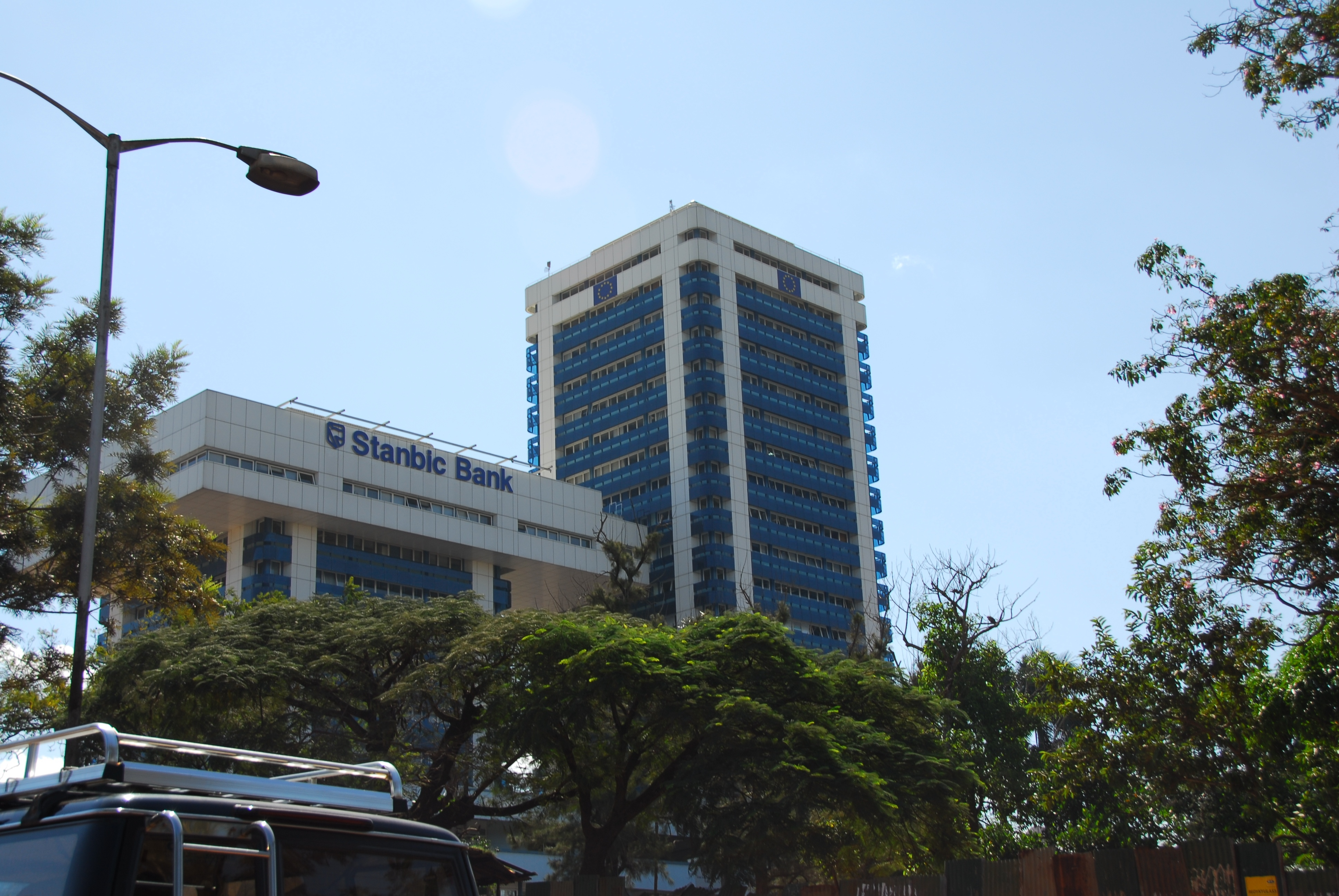
- Stanbic Bank Uganda Office in Kampala
- Type: Public
- Traded as: USE: SBU
- Industry: Financial services
- Founded: 1906; 120 years ago
- Headquarters: Kampala, Uganda
- Key people: Damoni Kitabire; Chairman, Kenneth Mumba Kalifungwa; Chief Executive Officer, Samuel Frederick Mwogeza; Executive Director and Paul Muganwa; Executive Director
- Products: Loans, savings, investments, debit cards, credit cards, mortgages
- Revenue: ▲ Aftertax USh:478 billion (US$131.104 million) (2024)
- Total assets: Shs10.4 trillion (US$2.852 billion) (December 2024)
- Number of employees: 1,907 (2024)
- Website: www.stanbicbank.co.ug

Stanbic Bank Uganda Limited (SBU) is a commercial bank in Uganda and is licensed by the Bank of Uganda, the central bank and national banking regulator.

== Overview ==
SBU is the largest commercial bank in the country, by assets. As of 31 December 2024, the bank's total assets were valued at USh10.4 trillion (US$2.852 billion). In calendar year 2024, the bank made an after-tax profit of USh478 billion (US$131.104 million). In June 2018, Fitch Rating Agency gave Stanbic Bank Uganda a AAA rating with a Stable outlook.

== Group ==
SBU is listed on the Uganda Securities Exchange (USE), where it trades under the symbol SBU. It offers a range of banking products including Internet banking, mobile money, SME lending, and debit and credit cards, among other products. SBU is a subsidiary of Stanbic Africa Holdings Limited, which is in turn owned by Standard Bank Group Limited.

== History ==
The bank was founded in Uganda as the National Bank of India in 1906. After several name changes, it became Grindlays Bank. In 1991, Standard Bank bought the Grindlays Bank network in Africa. The new owners renamed the bank Stanbic Bank (Uganda) Limited.

Stanbic Bank (Uganda) Limited is licensed as a merchant banker, stockbroker, and financial adviser by the Capital Markets Authority, which licensed the USE in 1997. In 2017 the bank was awarded a bancassurance licence from the Insurance Regulatory Authority, authorizing Stanbic Bank to sell insurance products to its customers and the public.

In February 2002, Standard Bank acquired 90 percent shareholding in the Uganda Commercial Bank, a government-owned retail banking operation with 65 branches. The new owners merged their new acquisition with their existing Stanbic Bank (Uganda) Limited to form Uganda's largest commercial bank by assets and branch network. In November 2005, the government of Uganda divested its ownership in Stanbic Bank (Uganda) by listing its shares on the USE. Standard Bank also floated 10 percent of its shareholding at the same time, reducing their ownership to 80 percent.

On 19 February 2018, SBU informed its shareholders of the Board of Directors’ decision to re-organize the company’s corporate structure and operations through the formation of a group with a holding company to be called "Stanbic Uganda Holdings Limited" owning several subsidiaries engaged in different lines of businesses including a new banking subsidiary which effectively began on 28 November 2018.

== Ownership ==
As of December 2017, the ownership of SBU stock, was as depicted in the table below:

Stanbic Bank Uganda Limited Stock Ownership
Rank	Name of owner	Percentage ownership
1	Stanbic Africa Holdings Limited	80.00
2	National Social Security Fund (Uganda)	2.61
3	Duet Africa Opportunities Master Fund	0.99
4	Kuwait Investment Authority	0.75
5	Sudhir Ruparelia	0.65
6	SBC Mauritius Re Africa Opportunity Fund LP	0.48
7	Central Bank of Kenya Pension Fund	0.45
8	Frontura Global Frontier Fund LLC	0.45
9	Bank of Uganda Defined Benefits Scheme	0.42
10	Ibrahim Kironde Kabanda	0.40
11	Others	12.80
	Total	100.0

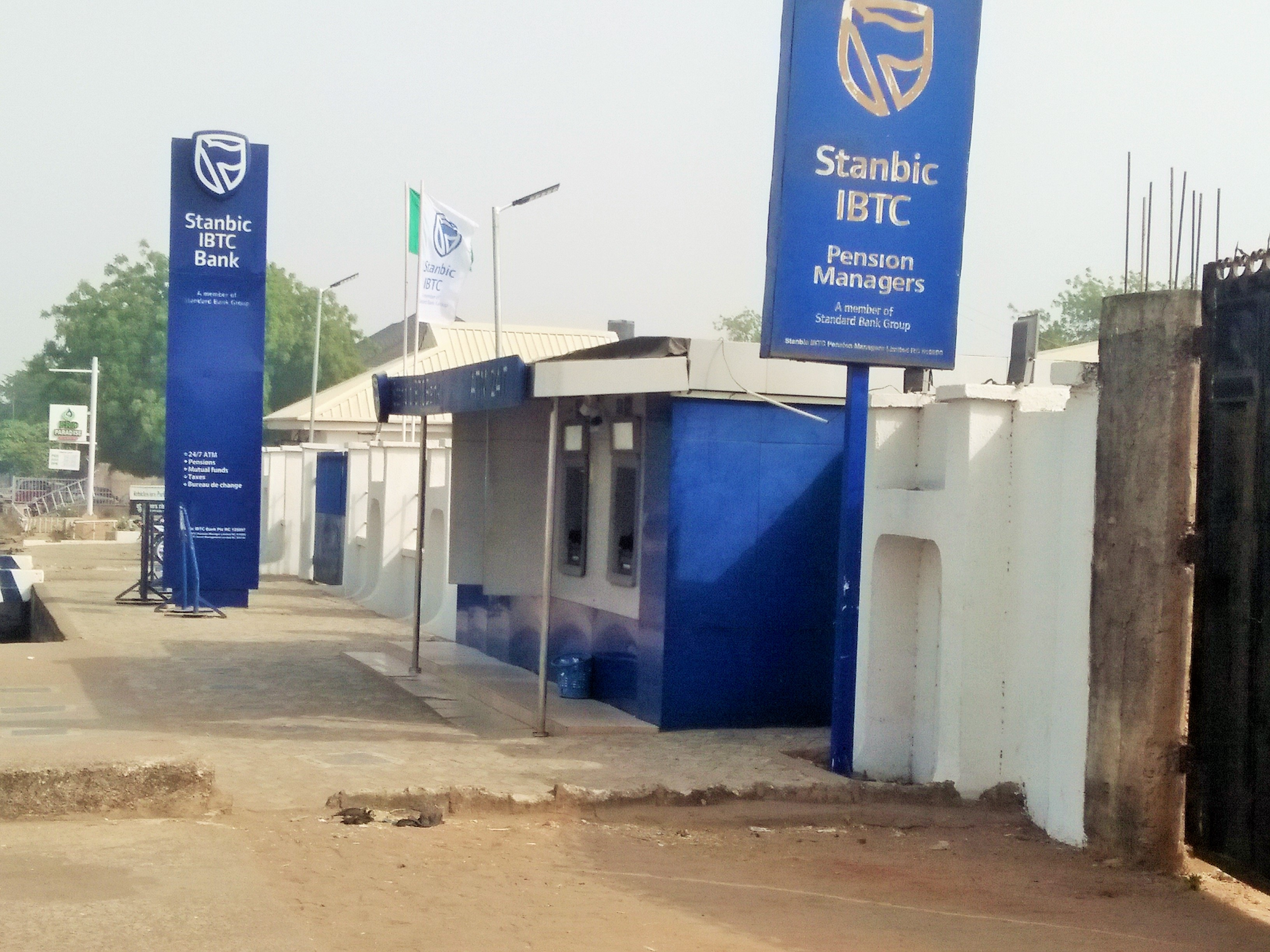
Stanbic bank, Gombe branch

== Governance ==
As of March 2025, the chairman of the board is Damoni Kitabire. The Chief Executive Officer is Kenneth Mumba Kalifungwa.

== Branch network ==
As of December 2023, SBU had a branch network of nearly 81 branches and 10 customers service points in all four regions of the country. Its network was the largest of all commercial banks in Uganda. At that time, it maintained 178 networked automated teller machines. Listed below were some of the branches of the bank:

1. Busia Branch: 1 Tororo Road, Busia
2. Iganga Branch: 1-3 Magumba Road, Iganga
3. Jinja Branch: 2 Martin Road, Jinja
4. Kamuli Branch: 2 Gabula Road, Kamuli
5. Kapchorwa Branch: 20 Kitale Road, Kapchorwa
6. Kotido Branch: 3A Moroto Road, Kotido
7. Lugazi Branch: 29 Ntege Road, Lugazi
8. Mbale Branch: 50/52 Republic Avenue, Mbale
9. Moroto Branch: 27 Lira Road, Moroto
10. Soroti Branch: 42 Gweri Road, Soroti
11. Tororo Branch: 1 Block 5 Uhuru Drive, Tororo
12. Aponye Mall Branch: 8 Burton Street, Aponye Mall, Kampala
13. Kawempe Branch: 161 Bombo Road, Kawempe
14. Kiboga Branch: 100 Block 634 Kilulumba, Kampala–Hoima Road Kiboga
15. Kireka Branch: 319 Block 232 Kampala–Jinja Highway, Kireka
16. Kyambogo Branch: Kyambogo University Campus, Kyambogo
17. Luweero Branch: 440 Block 652 Kampala–Gulu Highway, Luweero
18. Mityana Branch: 54 Block 425 Katakara Road, Mityana
19. Mpigi Branch: Mpigi Town
20. Mukono Branch: 37/39 Kampala–Jinja Highway, Mukono
21. Mulago Branch: 2nd Floor, Mulago National Referral Hospital, Mulago Hill, Kampala
22. Nakivubo Branch: 58 William Street, Kampala
23. Nateete Branch: 643 Block 18 Kampala–Masaka Road, Nateete
24. Wandegeya Branch: 220 Bombo Road, Wandegeya, Kampala
25. William Street Branch: 6 William Street, Kampala
26. Bugoloobi Branch: Village Mall, Corner of Spring Road & Bandari Rise, Bugoloobi, Kampala
27. Entebbe Main Branch: 15 Entebbe–Kampala Road, Entebbe
28. Forest Mall Branch: 3A2 & 3A3 Lugogo Bypass Road, Lugogo, Kampala.
29. Freedom City Branch: Freedom City Mall, 4010 Entebbe Road, Namasuba, Kampala
30. Garden City Branch: 64-86 Yusuf Lule Road, Kampala
31. Kabalagala Branch: 1188–1190 Embassy Plaza, Ggaba Road, Kabalagala, Kampala
32. Corporate Branch: 18 Hannington Road, Kampala
33. Lugogo Branch: Shop Number 5, 2-8 Lugogo Bypass Road, Lugogo, Kampala
34. Makerere Branch: Senate Building, Makerere University Campus, Makerere Hill, Kampala
35. Kampala Metro Branch: Social Security House, 4 Jinja Road, Kampala
36. Nakasero Branch: Umoja Building, 20 Nakasero Road, Nakasero Hill, Kampala
37. Nakawa Branch: M193/194 Industrial Area Road, Nakawa, Kampala
38. Ntinda Branch: 3798 Block 216 Ntinda Trading Centre, Kampala
39. Adjumani Branch: 9 Mangi Road, Adjumani
40. Apac Branch: 18 Akokoro Road, Apac
41. Arua Branch: 25 Avenue Road, Arua
42. Gulu Branch: 2&4 Acholi Road, Gulu
43. Kigumba Branch: 18 Kampala-Gulu Highway, Kigumba
44. Kitgum Branch: 4/6 Philip Adonga Road, Kitgum
45. Lira Branch: 2 Soroti Road, Lira
46. Moyo Branch: 1 Kerere Crescent Road, Moyo
47. Nebbi Branch: Arua Road, Nebbi Trading Centre
48. Buliisa Branch: Buliisa–Paara Road, Buliisa
49. Bundibugyo Branch: 4 Block A Bundibugyo Road, Bundibugyo Township
50. Bwamiramira Branch: 18 Karuguza Road, Bwamiramira Trading Centre, Kibaale District
51. Fort Portal Branch: 21 Lugard Road, Fort Portal
52. Hoima Branch: 32 Main Street, Hoima
53. Ibanda Branch: 10-12 Kamwege Road, Ibanda
54. Ishaka Branch: 44 Rukungiri Road, Ishaka
55. Kabale Branch: 150/152 Kabale Road, Kabale
56. Kabwohe Branch: 19B, Kabwohe Road, Kabwohe
57. Kalangala Branch: Kalangala Main Street, Kalangala Town
58. Kasese Branch: 27/31 Stanley Street, Kasese
59. Kihihi Branch: 63 Block 74 Kinkizi, Kihihi Town
60. Kisoro Branch: M5 Block 29 Kisoro–Kabale Road, Kisoro Town
61. Kyotera Branch: 32 Masaka Road, Kyotera
62. Lyantonde Branch: 200 Block 76 Masaka–Mbarara Road, Lyantonde
63. Masaka Branch: 4 Birch Avenue, Masaka
64. Masindi Branch: 29/33 Tongue Street, Masindi
65. Mbarara Branch: 1/3 Ntare Road, Mbarara
66. Mubende Branch: 2 Block 13 Main Street, Mubende
67. Ntungamo Branch: 33 Mbarara–Kabale Road, Ntungamo Township
68. Rukungiri Branch: 123 Block 5 Kagunga, Rukungiri
69. Bwera Customer Service Point: Saad Village, Mpondwe–Lubiriha Road, Bwera Town
70. Kaboong Customer Service Point: 20 Kaabong Central West Road, Kaabong Trading Centre
71. Kayunga Customer Service Point: 472 Block 123 Kayunga Road, Kayunga
72. Kagadi Customer Service Point: Mugenyi Street, Kagadi
73. Kumi Customer Service Point: 2 Ngora Road , Kumi
74. Pakwach Customer Service Point: 94 Arua Road, Pakwach
75. Kakira Customer Service Point: Kakira South Estate Road, Kakira
76. Kinyara Customer Service Point: Kinyara Sugar Estate, Kinyara
77. Mayuge Customer Service Point: Bukoba Road, Mayuge Town
78. Wobulenzi Customer Service Point: 59 Block 159 Bulemezi, Kampala–Gulu Highway, Wobulenzi Trading Centre.

== Certification ==
In June 2022, Stanbic Bank Uganda became the first commercial bank in the country, to be awarded the ISO/IEC 27001:2013 Certification, by the British Standards Institution. The certification is in recognition of the bank's Information Security Management Systems "compliance with global standards".

== Evolving Features ==
In May 2024, Stanbic Bank Uganda launched a brand new card reload feature that will allow all its customers holding prepaid cards to top up their card balances using its pre-existing service FlexiPay, by inserting the merchant code "Card" and providing client ID behind the card.

== See also ==
- Standard Bank of South Africa
- Banking in Uganda
- Economy of Uganda
- List of banks in Uganda
- List of tallest buildings in Kampala
