= KCB Bank Uganda Limited =

Commercial bank in Uganda

- Company type: Subsidiary of Kenya Commercial Bank Group; USE :KCB; NSE :KCB
- Industry: Banking
- Founded: 2007; 19 years ago
- Headquarters: Commercial Plaza; Kampala Road; Kampala, Uganda
- Key people: Constant Othieno Mayende (chairman); Edgar Byamah (CEO); Agnes Namyalo (executive director)
- Products: Loans, credit cards, savings, investments, mortgages
- Revenue: ▲ Aftertax: KES:377 million (US$3.54 million) (2018)
- Total assets: KES:18.77 billion (US$176 million) (2018)
- Number of employees: 420 (2015)
- Website: ug.kcbgroup.com

KCB Bank Uganda Limited, also KCB Bank Uganda, is a commercial bank in Uganda, a wholly owned subsidiary of the KCB Group, a financial services conglomerate, Kenya's largest bank. It is licensed by the Bank of Uganda, the central bank and national banking regulator.

== Overview ==
KCB Bank Uganda focuses on meeting the banking needs of individuals, corporate entities and small to medium enterprises. As of 31 December 2018, KCB Uganda had assets of KES:18.77 billion (US$176 million).

== Kenya Commercial Bank Group ==
Kenya Commercial Bank Uganda is a wholly owned subsidiary of the Kenya Commercial Bank Group, a financial services conglomerate, headquartered in Nairobi, Kenya, with subsidiaries in Kenya, Tanzania, Rwanda, South Sudan, Burundi and Uganda, with a representative office in Ethiopia. The shares of stock of KCB Group are listed on the Nairobi Stock Exchange and are cross-listed on the Uganda Securities Exchange under the symbol KCB. As of 30 June 2019, KCB Group had total assets of KES:746.51 billion (US$7.46 billion).

== History ==
In November 2007, the first branch of KCB Bank Uganda opened in Kampala, Uganda's capital city, following licensing by the Bank of Uganda. Since then, the bank has opened 15 more branches in the country. In November 2017, the bank marked 10 years of presence in the country. At that time, KCB had 16 branches, eight of them in Kampala and eight others in major cities and towns around Uganda.

KCB is a co-financier of EACOP. In March 2025, eleven activists who peacefully delivered a petition to stop funding the project at KCBs Kampala branch were arrested and taken to a maximum security prison.

== Governance ==
As of May 2021, the chairman of the board of directors iwa Constant Othieno Mayende. The managing director is Edgar Byamah.

== Location and branches ==
KCB Bank Uganda's headquarters are located at plot 56, Lohana Towers, Lugogo bypass in the central business district of Kampala, Uganda's capital city. The geographical coordinates of the bank's headquarters are: 0°18'46.0"N, 32°35'12.0"E (Latitude:0.312778; Longitude:32.586667).

As of July 2020, KCB Uganda had 16 branches in all the regions of Uganda, including at the following locations.

1. Arua Branch - Arua
2. Gulu Branch - Gulu
3. Lira Branch - Lira
4. Fort Portal Branch - Fort Portal
5. Jinja Branch - Jinja
6. Hoima Branch - Hoima
7. Kampala Road Branch — Kampala Road, Kampala (main branch)
8. Ben Kiwanuka Branch — Ben Kiwanuka Street, Kampala
9. Luwum Street Branch — Luwum Street, Kampala
10. Sixth Street Branch — Sixth Street, Industrial Area, Kampala
11. Oasis Mall Branch — Oasis Mall, Kampala Central Division, Kampala
12. Lugogo Branch - Lugogo, Kampala
13. Mbale Branch - Mbale
14. Mbarara Branch - High Street, Mbarara
15. Forest Mall Branch - Forest Mall, Lugogo Bypass, Kampala

== See also ==
- Banking in Uganda
- List of banks in Uganda
