= List of banks in Uganda =

This is a list of commercial banks and other credit institutions in Uganda, as updated 30 October 2025 by the Bank of Uganda and taking into account the more recent downgrading of three banks to other credit institutions.

== List of commercial banks ==
- Absa Bank Uganda Limited, part of Absa Group
- Bank of Africa Limited, part of Bank of Africa Group
- Bank of Baroda Uganda Limited, part of Bank of Baroda Group
- Bank of India (Uganda) Limited, part of Bank of India Group
- Cairo Bank Uganda Limited, part of Banque du Caire Group
- Centenary Rural Development Bank Limited, part of the Centenary Group
- Citibank Uganda Limited, part of Citigroup
- DFCU Bank Limited
- Diamond Trust Bank Uganda Limited, part of Diamond Trust Bank Group
- Ecobank Uganda Limited, part of Ecobank Group
- Equity Bank Uganda Limited, part of Equity Group
- Exim Bank Uganda Limited, part of Exim Bank Group based in Tanzania
- Housing Finance Bank Uganda Limited, 50 percent state-owned
- KCB Bank Uganda Limited, part of KCB Group
- NCBA Bank Uganda Limited, part of NCBA Group
- I&M Bank (Uganda) Limited, part of I&M Bank Group
- Salaam Bank Uganda, part of Salaam African Bank in Djibouti
- Stanbic Bank Uganda Limited, part of Standard Bank Group
- Standard Chartered Bank Uganda Limited, part of Standard Chartered Group
- Tropical Bank Limited, part of Libyan Foreign Bank Group
- United Bank for Africa Uganda Limited, part of UBA Group
- Pearl Bank Uganda Limited, state-owned

== List of investment banks ==
- African Alliance Uganda Limited
- Baroda Capital Uganda Limited
- Crested Capital Uganda Limited
- Dyer & Blair Uganda Limited
- Old Mutual Uganda Limited

== Other licensed credit institutions ==
- ABC Capital Bank Uganda Limited, part of ABC Bank Group
- BRAC Uganda Bank Limited
- Finance Trust Bank (Effective 1 April 2026)
- Guaranty Trust Bank (Uganda) Limited, part of GTCO Group
- Opportunity Bank Uganda Limited
- Yako Bank Uganda Limited
- Pride Bank Limited, state-owned

== See also ==
- List of microfinance deposit-taking institutions in Uganda
- Uganda Development Bank
- Banking in Uganda
- List of banks in Africa
