= KCB Group =

African financial services holding company

KCB Group plc
- Type: Public
- Traded as: KN: KCB
- Industry: Banking
- Founded: July 1896; 130 years ago
- Headquarters: Nairobi, Kenya
- Key people: Joseph Kinyua (chairman); Paul Russo (chief executive officer)
- Products: Credit cards, loans, mortgages, investments
- Revenue: ▲US$504.75 million (KES:73.1 billion) (H1 2023)
- Net income: ▲Profit (after-tax) US$111.17 million (KES:16.1 billion) (H1 2023)
- Total assets: ▲US$12.84 billion (KES:1.86 trillion) (H1 2023)
- Number of employees: 6,483 (2017)
- Website: kcbgroup.com

KCB Group Limited, also known as the KCB Group, is a financial services holding company based in the African Great Lakes region. The Group's headquarters are in Nairobi, Kenya, with its subsidiaries being KCB Bank Kenya Limited, KCB Bank Burundi Limited, KCB Bank Rwanda Limited, KCB Bank South Sudan Limited, KCB Bank Tanzania Limited, KCB TMB Congo and KCB Bank Uganda Limited.

== Overview ==
As of June 2023, the Group had assets of US$12.84 billion (KSh:1.86 trillion) with shareholders' equity of US$1.5 billion (KSh:US$218 billion). In July 2015, news media reported that the group was pursuing expansion plans into the Democratic Republic of the Congo, Ethiopia, and Mozambique.

== History ==
The history of Kenya Commercial Bank Limited dates back to July 1896, when its predecessor, the National Bank of India (NBI), opened a branch in Mombasa to handle the business that the port was attracting at that time.

In 1958, Grindlays Bank merged with the NBI to form the National and Grindlays Bank (NGB). Upon independence, the government of Kenya acquired 60 percent shareholding in NGB in an effort to bring banking closer to the majority of Kenyans. In 1970, the government acquired 100 percent of the shareholding in NGB to take full control of the largest commercial bank in Kenya. NGB was then renamed Kenya Commercial Bank (KCB). In 1972, KCB acquired Savings & Loan Kenya Limited, which specialized in mortgage finance.

In 1988, the first 20 percent of the government's shares in the company were sold through an Initial public offering on the Nairobi Securities exchange. The government has over the years reduced its shareholding to 23.6 percent. In the rights issue of 2010, the government further reduced its shareholding to 17.31 percent.

KCB Tanzania Limited was incorporated in Dar es Salaam in 1997. Since then, KCB has opened 11 more branches in Tanzania. In May 2006, KCB extended its operations to South Sudan following licensing of KCB Sudan. This subsidiary now has over 20 branches in that country. In November 2007, KCB Bank Uganda Limited was opened. KCB currently has 14 branches in Uganda. In December 2008, KCB Rwanda began operations with one branch at Kigali. There are currently 11 branches spread out in the country. In 2012, KCB registered a subsidiary in Burundi, KCB Burundi, becoming the first bank in the region to be presented in all the African Great Lakes countries.

Before 2015, KCB was both a licensed bank and a holding company for its subsidiaries. In compliance with the Kenya Finance Act No. 57 of 2012, KCB Group announced in April 2015 its intention to incorporate a new, wholly owned subsidiary, KCB Bank Kenya Limited, to which it would transfer its Kenyan banking business, assets, and liabilities. The re-organisation converted KCB Group into a non-trading holding company that owns both banking and non-banking subsidiary companies.

== Ownership ==
The shares of KCB Group are listed on the Nairobi Securities Exchange under the symbol KCB. The Group's stock is cross listed on the Dar es Salaam Stock Exchange, the Rwanda Stock Exchange, and the Uganda Securities Exchange.

As of 31 December 2023, the ten largest shareholders in the KCB Group were as listed below:

KCB Group Limited stock ownership
Rank	Name of owner	Percentage ownership
1	Permanent Secretary to the Treasury of Kenya	19.76
2	National Social Security Fund (Kenya)	9.73
11	Other shareholders via the NSE, DSE, USE and RSE	70.51
	Total	100.00

== Governance ==
The chairman of the bank's board of directors is Dr. Joseph Kinyua. Paul Russo is both the managing director and the chief executive officer of the banking group.

== Member companies ==
- KCB Bank Kenya Limited – Nairobi, Kenya
- National Bank of Kenya – Nairobi, Kenya
- BPR Bank Rwanda Plc – Kigali, Rwanda
- KCB Bank South Sudan Limited – Juba, South Sudan
- KCB Bank Tanzania Limited – Dar es Salaam, Tanzania
- KCB Bank Uganda Limited – Kampala, Uganda
- KCB Bank Burundi Limited – Bujumbura, Burundi
- Trust Merchant Bank - Lubumbashi, Democratic Republic of the Congo
- KCB Foundation Limited – Nairobi, Kenya
- KCB Sports Sponsorship Limited – Nairobi, Kenya
- Savings & Loan Kenya Limited – Nairobi, Kenya

== Branches of subsidiaries ==
KCB subsidiary	No. of branches
KCB Bank Kenya	200
KCB Bank South Sudan	20
KCB Bank Tanzania	17
KCB Bank Uganda	15
KCB Bank Rwanda	11
KCB Bank Burundi	3

=== KCB Bank Burundi ===
Kenya Commercial Bank Burundi Limited is a commercial bank and subsidiary of KCB group in Burundi, licensed by the Bank of the Republic of Burundi, the national banking regulator. As of December 2015 KCB Burundi comprises 0.6 percent of the KCB Group's total assets. It is estimated that the bank's total assets were approximately US$33.6 million (KSh3.34 billion), as of December 2015.

In February 2012, KCB Group received regulatory approval to establish a subsidiary in Burundi. KCB Burundi commenced provision of banking services on 8 May 2012, having been granted a commercial banking license on 18 April 2012. With its establishment, KCB became the first financial services group to establish subsidiaries in all countries of the East African Community.

In February 2020, KCB Burundi opened its third branch in the country in Gitega, Burundi's capital. This was after years of stagnation due to political unrest. As of September 2020, KCB Burundi maintained two branches in Bujumbura, and one in Gitega.

=== Trust Merchant Bank ===
In August 2022, KCB Group agreed to acquire 85 percent shareholding in Trust Merchant Bank at "1.49 times the book value". At that time, the bank was the third-largest bank by assets in the Democratic Republic of the Congo. It is estimated that the transaction would cost approximately KSh15 billion/= (US$127 million then). KCB also agreed to acquire the remaining 15 percent ownership in the bank, not later than 2024. The deal requires shareholder and regulatory approvals in Kenya and DRCongo.

== Kenya Commercial Bank KCB Towers ==
In December 2010, construction of a new headquarters building began in the Upper Hill section of Nairobi. Construction took two years, with occupancy beginning in January 2013. The new Kenya Commercial Bank Towers (KCB Towers) is 21 storeys tall, having about 15,960 square metres (171,800 ft^{2}) of rentable office space and enough parking for about 450 cars. The owners of the building are the Kenya Commercial Bank Employee Pension Fund, which is funding the KES:2.1 billion construction.

== See also ==
- Kenya Commercial Bank S.C.
