= Banking in Uganda =

Before Uganda's independence in 1962, the main banks in Uganda were Barclays (UK based); Grindlays (also UK), Standard Bank (South Africa based) and the Bank of Baroda from India. The currency was issued by the East African Currency Board, a London-based body. In 1966, the Bank of Uganda (BoU), which controlled the issue of currency and managed foreign exchange reserves, became the Central Bank and national banking regulator. The government-owned Uganda Commercial Bank and the Uganda Development Bank were launched in the 1960s. The Uganda Development Bank is a state-owned development finance institution, which channeled loans from international sources into Ugandan enterprises and administered most of the development loans made to Uganda.

The East African Development Bank (EADB), established in 1967, was jointly owned by Uganda, Kenya, and Tanzania. It was also concerned with development finance. It survived the breakup of the East African Community in 1977 and received a new charter in 1980.

In the 1960s, other commercial banks included local operations of the Bank of Baroda, Barclays, the Bank of India, Grindlays Bank, Standard Chartered, and the Uganda Cooperative Bank. The Uganda government took majority shares in all commercial banks in 1969 as part of President Obote's "Move to the Left" policy. This was increased to 100 percent control when European and Asian business owners were expelled in 1972-75 under President Idi Amin.

During the 1970s and early 1980s, the number of commercial bank branches and services contracted significantly. Whereas Uganda had 290 commercial bank branches in 1970, by 1987 there were only 84, of which 58 branches were operated by government-owned banks. This number began to increase slowly the following year, and in 1989 the gradual increase in banking activity signaled growing confidence in Uganda's economic recovery.

== 1990s–2004 ==
In the late 1990s and early 2000s, the Ugandan banking industry underwent significant restructuring. Several indigenous commercial banks were declared insolvent, taken over by the central bank, and eventually sold or liquidated. These included the Uganda Cooperative Bank, Greenland Bank, the International Credit Bank, Teefe Bank, and Gold Trust Bank. The Uganda Commercial Bank (UCB) was initially privatized through a sale of its majority shares to a purported company from Malaysia. It later became public, however, that the actual buyer was a partnership between Greenland Bank, which was insolvent at the time, and politically connected individuals. A second privatization sale was conducted, with the Standard Bank of South Africa emerging as the winner.

The privatized UCB was merged with the former Grindlays Bank Uganda that the Standard Bank of South Africa already owned and had renamed Stanbic Bank (Uganda). The combined bank is now known as Stanbic Bank Uganda Limited. As of 2008, Stanbic Uganda was the dominant commercial bank in Uganda, with about 27 percent of all bank assets and about 20 percent of all bank branches.

Nile Bank Limited, an indigenous institution, was acquired by the British conglomerate Barclays in January 2007 and merged with its existing Ugandan operations to form the Barclays Bank of Uganda.

A moratorium on new commercial bank licences was declared in 2004 with the passage of a new banking bill in Parliament, which established new banking institution classification guidelines. There are four classes of lending financial institutions under the new regulations as outlined below.

== Regulatory changes, 2007–2010 ==
During the 18 months following the July 2007 lifting of the new banks moratorium, several commercial banks were newly licensed. These included KCB Bank Uganda Limited, Equity Bank Uganda Limited, GT Bank Uganda, Global Trust Bank, United Bank for Africa, Ecobank, and Housing Finance Bank. Three other banks, ABC Bank (Kenya), Access Bank from Nigeria, and CRDB Bank from Tanzania, publicly declared their intention to start banking operations in Uganda.

During 2008 and 2009, several of the existing banks went on an accelerated branch expansion through mergers and acquisitions or new branch openings. As of December 2009, total commercial bank assets in Uganda were estimated at USh 8.73 trillion. In April 2009, Bank PHB, Nigeria's fifth largest bank at the time, bought 80 percent ownership of Orient Bank, Uganda's eighth largest commercial bank. This brought the number of Ugandan banks with major investments from Nigeria to three.

In October 2010, there were 22 licensed commercial banks in Uganda, with nearly 400 bank branches and almost 600 automated teller machines. At that time, the bank accounts in the country numbered over 5 million. This represented a 16 percent penetration, given Uganda's population of about 32 million at that time.

In November 2010, the BoU directed that all commercial banks in Uganda must raise their minimum capital to USh 10 billion by March 2011 and to USh 25 billion by March 2013.

According to a study published in 2010, most of the banking activity was concentrated around Kampala, the country's capital, and other large towns, leaving 42 percent of Ugandans dependent on the informal financial sector and another 30 percent totally excluded from the financial services sector.

== After 2010 ==
By April 2011, the number of commercial banks had increased to 23. The bank branches in the country numbered over 400. The banking sector employed over 8,700 people. Total commercial bank assets in the country were valued at more than USh 11 trillion.

During 2012, the BoU closed the National Bank of Commerce (Uganda) (NBCU), a small indigenous operation with wealthy investors, some of whom held high-ranking government positions. NBCU's deposits were transferred to Crane Bank. In November 2012, the total number of commercial bank branches in the country reached 500.

In June 2012, the BoU estimated the total banking assets in the country at USh 14.4 trillion. In June 2013, the BoU estimated the total of all commercial bank assets in the country at USh 15.7 trillion. Those assets had increased to USh 18.6 trillion by 30 June 2014. As of 31 December 2015, total banking assets in the country were USh 21.7 trillion.

The Bank of Uganda reported total banking assets at USh 24.9 trillion, as at 30 June 2017, with 7.4 million commercial bank accounts in the country. At that time, there were 546 bank branches and 818 ATMs in Uganda.

As of June 2019, according to the Uganda Deposit Protection Fund, total banking assets in the country were USh 30.3 trillion (US$8.34 billion), with total customer deposits of USh 22 trillion (US$6.05 billion), held in approximately 14 million deposit accounts. The total banking sector loan portfolio had a 3.48 percent non-performing loan ratio. At that time, the Deposit Protection Fund had assets valued at USh 689 billion (US$190 million).

As of January 2020, according to Uganda Bankers Association, there were 13 million bank accounts in Uganda and 11,000 banking agents countrywide.

== Asset allocation among commercial banks in Uganda ==
As of December 2022, total assets in Uganda's banking institutions were valued at USh45.44 trillion (approx. US$12.3 billion). At that time the 10 largest commercial banks accounted for 82.18 percent of total banking assets, while the remaining 15 commercial banks held 17.82 percent. The top five banks held a combined market share of 57.54 percent of total national banking assets. As of December 2023 total bank assets in the country were valued at UGX:45.91 trillion (US$13.9 billion). At that time, the six largest and systemically important commercial banks (Stanbic, Standard Chartered, Centenary, Absa Uganda, Dfcu Bank and Equity Bank Uganda) held a combined market share of 62.15 percent in assets.

== Classification of financial institutions ==
=== Tier I financial Institutions ===
This class includes commercial banks that are authorized to hold checking, savings, and time deposit accounts for individuals and institutions in local and international currencies. Commercial banks are also authorized to buy and sell foreign exchange, issue letters of credit, and make loans to depositors and non-depositors.

=== Tier II financial institutions ===
This class includes credit and finance companies. They are not authorized to establish checking accounts or trade in foreign currency. They are authorized to accept customer deposits and to establish savings accounts. They are also authorized to make loans backed with collateral or without collateral to savings and non-savings customers.

The licensed credit institutions as of 12 December 2024 were:

- BRAC Uganda Bank Limited
- Yako Bank Uganda Limited
- Opportunity Bank Uganda Limited
- Guaranty Trust Bank Uganda
- ABC Capital Bank Uganda
- Pride Bank Limited

=== Tier III financial institutions ===
This class includes microfinance institutions that are allowed to accept deposits from customers but only in the form of savings accounts. Members of this class of institutions are known as Microfinance Deposit-taking Institutions or MDIs. MDIs are not authorized to offer checking accounts or to trade in foreign currency.

The MDIs in the country as of 14 December 2024 were:

- FINCA Uganda Limited
- UGAFODE Microfinance Limited

=== Tier IV institutions ===
These institutions are regulated by the Uganda Microfinance Regulatory Authority (UMRA). They are not authorized to accept deposits from the public. They may, however, offer loans backed with collateral or without collateral to the public. In 2008, it was estimated that there were over 1,000 such institutions in the country.

- Letshego Microfinance Uganda
- Asaak Financial Services Limited
- Hofokam Limited
- VisionFund Uganda Limited

=== Development banks ===
- East African Development Bank
- Uganda Development Bank

=== Investment banks and stock brokerage firms ===
Investment banks and stock brokerage firms in Uganda are regulated by the Capital Markets Authority and the various stock exchanges in the country.

=== Insurance companies ===
There were 18 insurance companies in Uganda in January 2015.

=== Foreign exchange bureaus ===
As of March 2016, there were 246 licensed foreign exchange bureaus in the country.

== Deposit insurance ==
The Uganda Deposit Protection Fund became operational in 1997. It is funded by premiums charged to every licensed deposit-taking financial institution in the country. Each account is protected up to USh 10 million. The Depositor Insurance Law was enacted by Parliament and states that all depositors must be paid within 90 days of a bank failure and that the failing institution must be sold by the auctioning of its assets within six months of its seizure by the central bank. If the central bank determines that the failed institution will fetch a better economic return, if sold as a whole, then it will re-open under new ownership and management, provided the new owners and managers meet the approval of the BoU.

== Credit bureaux ==
In 2008, the Bank of Uganda registered Compuscan CRB Ltd, a subsidiary of Compuscan, as the first credit reference bureau in the county. In addition to its traditional credit bureau services, Compuscan CRB introduced and maintained the biometric identity smart card system used in the Ugandan financial industry.

With improved credit risk assessment afforded by the credit bureau, new products, including medium and long-term financing like car loans and mortgages, have been introduced by most Ugandan commercial banks. As of April 2014, interest rates that were formerly in the 20 to 30 percent range had dropped to as low as 10 percent for the best customers at some banks.

In 2015, Ugandan regulators licensed an additional credit bureau, Metropol Credit Reference Bureau Limited. Based out of Nairobi, Kenya, Metropol has operations in Kenya, Rwanda, Tanzania, and Uganda.

== See also ==
- Asset allocation among commercial banks in Uganda
- List of banks in Africa (Uganda)
