= Haco Industries Kenya Limited =

Personal and home care products manufacturer

- Company type: Private
- Industry: Consumer Goods
- Founded: 1974 (age 51–52)
- Founder: Chris Kirubi
- Headquarters: Kasarani, Nairobi, Kenya
- Area served: East Africa, Comesa Region
- Key people: Mary-Ann Musangi; Managing Director
- Products: Household items
- Website: www.haco.co.ke

Haco Industries Kenya Limited is a Kenyan personal and home care products manufacturer that distributes its products in the countries of the East African Community and in the Comesa Region.

== Location ==
The headquarters and main factory of Haco Industries Kenya Limited (HACO) are located in the neighborhood known as Kasarani, in the city of Nairobi, Kenya's capital city, about 16 kilometres (10 mi), by road, north-east of the city centre. The geographical coordinates of the company headquarters are: 01°13'13.0"S, 36°54'43.0"E (Latitude:-1.220278; Longitude:36.911944).

== Overview ==
Kenyan entrepreneur Chris Kirubi founded HACO in the early 1970s, manufacturing a single product back then. Early products included shaving products and stationery. In the 1990s, the company diversified into personal and home care products. Its product-line includes stationery, disposable shavers, personal care products, and household detergents.

HACO partners with international brand-name owners to manufacture branded products in its area of distribution. Such partners include Société Bic of France, Pro-line International Inc. of the United States, Alberto-Culver Inc. of the USA, E.T. Browne Drug Company Inc. of the United States and Jeyes Plc. of the United Kingdom. HACO distributes its manufactured products in Burundi, Djibouti, Eritrea, Ethiopia, Kenya, Uganda, Tanzania and Rwanda.

== Products ==
Products include plastic pens, disposable shavers, hair care products, skin and home care products.

== Ownership ==
HACO was founded by industrialist Chris Kirubi in 1974. In 2008, Tiger Brands, the South African home products conglomerate acquired a 51 percent controlling interest in the company, for an estimated KSh363 million (approx. US$3.63 million).

When the two joint-venture partner disagreed on future strategy, Kirubi agreed to buy back the 51 percent shareholding that he had sold to Tiger Brands, albeit at a premium. That buy-back was concluded in December 2017, leaving Chris Kirubi as the sole owner of the company.

== Relationship with Société Bic ==
In August 2018, Société Bic of France and Haco Industries, signed an agreement to end Haco's tenure as franchisee and Bic's relationship as "franchiser". The separation would include the sale to Bic of Haco's semi-automated production line, at an undisclosed sum. In December 2018, the arrangement received regulatory approval from the Competition Authority of Kenya, and is expected to close by 1 January 2019. In February 2019, Business Daily Africa reported that Société Bic paid KSh714 million (€6.3 million) to conclude this acquisition.

== See also ==
- Centum Investments
- 98.4 Capital FM
- Sidian Bank
