= Mary-Ann Musangi =

Kenyan businesswoman

- Born: 1971 (age 54–55); Nairobi, Kenya
- Citizenship: Kenya
- Education: University of Surrey (BBA),(M.Sc)
- Occupation: Businesswoman
- Years active: 1994 – present
- Known for: Being the Heiress of Chris Kirubi's business holdings and investments.
- Children: 2
- Parent: Father:Chris Kirubi

Mary-Ann Wambui Kirubi Musangi, commonly referred to as Mary-Ann Musangi is a Kenyan businesswoman and entrepreneur who is the managing director of Haco Industries Kenya Limited, a Kenyan manufacturer and distributor of fast-moving consumer goods in the African Great Lakes Region.

== Early life and education ==
She was born in 1971 to Chris Kirubi (1921 - 2021) and his wife Fiona Kirubi. Her parents divorced when she was still young. She has one brother, Robert Kirubi and one step-sister, Fiona Farha Kirubi.

She graduated from the University of Surrey in the United Kingdom with a degree of Bachelor of Business Administration. She followed that with a Master's Degree in Management from the same university.

== Career ==
=== 1994 to 2017 ===
After her studies in Europe, she returned to her native Kenya and took up employment with several employers, including Coca-Cola Company, GlaxoSmithKline, KCB Group and Ogilvy & Mather. After serving for five years as a marketing director for Kenya Commercial Bank, she resigned in 2011 to open Secret Garden, a high-end restaurant. She followed that with a second high-end eatery Olpul, in 2017. Both enterprises folded during the COVID-19 pandemic.

=== Heir of Chris Kirubi's Business Holdings ===
After her late father was diagnosed with colon cancer in 2018, Mary-Ann Musangi was appointed managing director of Haco Industries Limited in February 2019. After the death of her father in June 2021, she disclosed that she worked closely with him during the last five years of his life in Haco Industries and other family businesses.

In June 2021 when Mary-Ann's father Chris Kirubi died he bequeathed 80 percent of his estate to Mary-Ann and her brother Robert. As of 2023, the estate was valued at KSh 40 billion ($350 million).

=== Other Notable Board Positions ===
Over the years she has served on the boards of directors of national, regional and international companies, including Haco Tiger Brands, UAP Investments Limited, International House Limited, Woof Advertising & Marketing, Croyden Limited, Sheraton Rongai and Sidian Bank.

== Personal life ==
She is married to Andrew Mukite Musangi, a lawyer who is now the chairman of the board of directors of the Central Bank of Kenya. Together they are parents to two daughters.

=== Wealth ===
Following the death of her father(Chris Kirubi) in 2021, Mary-Ann Musangi took over ownership and management of her late father's diverse business empire in media, manufacturing, technology, real estate and finance. The value of the estate was valued at approximately KSh40 billion (US$350 million) as of 2023.

In 2011, According to a Forbes Ranking of the 40 richest in Africa,Chris Kirubi's estate was estimated to be worth $300 million as of 2011 with Chris Kirubi then ranked as the second-richest individual in Kenya, and the 31st richest in Africa as of December 2011.

== See also ==
- Centum Investments
- Sidian Bank
- James Mworia
