= Kenneth Mbae =

Kenyan corporate executive

- Born: c. 1981 (age 44–45); Kenya
- Education: Kenyatta University [] Kenya Institute of Management.
- Occupations: Businessman and Corporate Executive
- Years active: 2011 – present
- Known for: Leadership and business expertise
- Title: Chief executive officer at Centum Real Estate Company Limited

Kenneth Gitonga Mbae (born c. 1987) is the MD at Centum Real Estate Company (Centum RE), a 100 percent subsidiary company of Centum Investments, the East African private equity conglomerate. Before that, he served as the chief operating officer of Centum RE, where he oversaw operations in Kenya and Uganda. Kenneth is based in Nairobi, Kenya's capital city.

== Background and education ==
Mbae was born in Kenya (Kangaita, Timau in Meru County)c. 1987. After attending local primary and Ontulili secondary school, he was admitted to Kenyatta University, graduating with a Bachelor of Science degree in Biochemistry. He is an alumnus of the Harvard Graduate School of Design. He also holds an Advanced Management Certificate in Business Management from the Kenya Institute of Management, in Nairobi, Kenya.

== Career ==
Mbae joined Centum Investments in 2011, one year after graduating from Kenyatta University. He was assigned to the real estate unit of the business. He rose through the ranks, attaining the title of deputy managing director for Athena Properties, Centum's subsidiary that delivered Two Rivers Mall . Two Rivers Mall is the largest shopping mall in Kenya, based on available shopping space.

From there, Mbae was in 2018, appointed as the managing director of Vipingo Development, a subsidiary of Centum Real Estate. He is credited with transforming Vipingo from a KSh5 billion (US$44 million) sisal plantation, to a KSh20 billion (US$176 million) real estate business, employing over 20 people, from the previous two. Vipingo has created over 1,500 direct jobs in the construction arena; all in a period of less than four years.

In his new role, since 17 March 2022, Kenneth Mbae replaces Samuel Kariuki, who resigned from Centum RE, in order to pursue other interests.

== See also ==
- James Mworia
