= Longhorn Kenya Limited =

Longhorn Publishers PLC
- Company type: Public company KN: LKL
- Industry: Publishing
- Founded: 1965
- Headquarters: Funzi Road; Industrial Area; Nairobi, Kenya
- Key people: Maxwell Wahome; Group Managing Director; Francis Thombe Nyammo; Group Chairman
- Website: Homepage

Longhorn Publishers PLC is a Pan-African publishing house that is publicly listed in the Nairobi Securities Exchange. The company has grown its dominance in the publishing sector by establishing its presence throughout the region.

In the East African region, the company has fully incorporated subsidiaries in Uganda, Tanzania, Rwanda, and Zambia. Through distributor agreements, the company has been able to expand its operations across the African continent to include Malawi, Zambia, South Sudan, and Senegal.

== History ==
Longhorn Publishers Plc operations commenced in Kenya in May 1965 as Longmans of Kenya a wholly owned subsidiary of Longman Group International of the United Kingdom. Its main business was selling and promotion of Longman publications published in the UK. In December 1969, the company changed the name to Longman Kenya Limited. It was only until the 1970s when the company began printing locally. A government decision in the early 1990s led to the ban of importation of textbooks. This initiative led to reduced margins thus led to Longman gradually reducing its shareholding in the business due to unattractive returns. In 1993, Longman UK fully divested from the company when it sold its remaining 40% shareholding to Kenyan investors including Centum Investment Company. As a result of this divestiture, the company changed its name to Longhorn Kenya Limited.

In October 1995, Longhorn incorporated Longhorn Publishers Uganda as its first foreign subsidiary in Uganda. It later incorporated Longhorn Publishers Tanzania Limited in May 2005. As a sales and promotions outfit for products developed by Longhorn Kenya. Longhorn entered the Rwanda and Malawi markets in 2009 through agents.

Longhorn shares were listed on the NSE on 30 May 2012 through Introduction. This made it the only first publishing firm to go public in an industry valued at KES 12 billion in Kenya alone.

In March 2015, The group announced its intention to re-brand Longhorn Kenya to Longhorn Publishers to give it a regional look before proceeding to cross-list its share on the Dar es Salaam, Uganda and the Rwanda Stock Exchanges.

== Subsidiaries and Investments ==
The companies that comprise Longhorn include the following:

1. Longhorn Publishers Plc – Nairobi, Kenya - 100% Shareholding - The flagship company of the group. Offering Publishing, sales and promotions.
2. Longhorn Publishers Uganda – Kampala, Uganda - 100% Shareholding - Offering sales and promotions in Uganda.
3. Longhorn Publishers Tanzania - Dar es Salaam, Tanzania - 100% Shareholding - Offering sales and promotions in Tanzania.

== Ownership ==
The shares of Longhorn Publishers Plc are traded on the Nairobi Securities Exchange, under the symbol: LKL. The shareholding in the company's stock as at June 30, 2016 was as depicted in the table below:

Longhorn Kenya Limited
Rank	Name of Owner	Percentage Ownership
1	Centum Investment	60.20
2	Pacific Futures and Options Limited	12.85
3	Francis Thombe Nyammo	5.88
4	Halifax Capital Corporation Limited	4.49
5	Kamami Investments Limited	1.14
6	Text Book Centre Limited	1.05
7	Other	14.39
	Total	100.0

== Governance ==
The running is overseen by a nine-person board with Francis Thombe Nyammo as the group chairman and Maxwell Wahome as the group managing director.

== See also ==
- Centum Investment
- Nairobi Securities Exchange
- Economy of Kenya
- Longman
