= Kenya Wine Agencies Limited =

Manufacturer, importer and distributor of wine and spirits based in Kenya

- Company type: Private company
- Industry: Manufacturing & Marketing
- Founded: 1969
- Headquarters: Nairobi, Kenya
- Key people: Kuria Muchiru (Chairperson); Lina Githuka (Managing Director)
- Products: Wine, Spirits & Juices
- Number of employees: 229 (2021)
- Website: www.kwal.co.ke

Kenya Wine Agencies Limited (KWAL), is a first line manufacturer, importer and distributor of wine, spirits and non-alcoholic beverages

== History ==
The company was founded in 1969 by the Government of Kenya, to consolidate and streamline the importation and distribution of wine and spirits in the country. The agency opened its first wholly owned winery in 1982. Initially, KWAL enjoyed a monopoly, which was broken when the country's economy was liberalized. In the beginning, KWAL was a 100% parastatal, owned through the Industrial and Commercial Development Corporation (ICDC) now Kenya Development Corporation (KDC).

In 2012, KWAL and the Distell Group Limited fought each other's in a legal feud when Distell started to bypass KWAL to distribute its beverages in Kenya. KWAL was the sole distributor of 80% of Distell beverages in Kenya. At this point, the Kenyan government had already considered selling a fair share of KWAL to Distell, but the process had been delayed.

In 2014, the process of divestiture by the government was kick-started when 26% shareholding was sold to the South African multinational conglomerate Distell Group Limited. Beginning in February 2015, the Government of Kenya began the process of selling 4% ownership to the estimated 235 company employees at the time at a price of KSh34 (US$0.00378) per share. The process is expected to conclude in April or May 2015. ICDC still has a 42.65 stake to dispose of. Since 2017, Distell Group Limited owns a majority share in KWAL, having acquired an additional 26% stake from the Industrial and Commercial Development Corporation (ICDC) now Kenya Development Corporation (KDC).

In October 2018, Lina Githuka was appointed new managing director of the company, succeeding to Carlos Gomes. In 2019, KWAL started its own production of Hunters-branded cider. In February 2021, KWAL launched the construction of its new manufacturing facility in Tatu City, its first in 20 years.

== Description ==
=== Activities ===
KWAL is a wine manufacturer, distiller, importer and distributor of alcoholic beverages, headquartered in Nairobi, with a distribution network throughout Kenya's urban centres. The company has an established countrywide branch network and is repositioning itself to grow the market in line with its renewed vision of being the preferred provider of Quality beverages in Eastern Africa and beyond.

KWAL pioneered the wine industry in Kenya having established the first commercial winery in Kenya in 1982.

=== Ownership ===
The company is owned by KWAL Holdings E.A. Limited (KHEAL). KHEAL the parent Company of the KWAL group of companies has shareholding as follows as of June 2022:

Kenya Wine Agencies Limited Stock Ownership
Rank	Name of Owner	Percentage Ownership
1	Distell Group Limited	55.44
2	KDC	43.77
3	Other	0.79
	Total	100.00

In May 2021, the Heineken group offered to acquire the Distell group, which would make the Dutch group the majority shareholder of KWAL.

== See also ==
- EAC
- Centum
- ICDC
- Kenya Economy
- Uchumi
