= Prawn Rougaille =

Mauritian dish primarily composed on tomato-based sauce and prawn

Prawn rougaille is a Mauritian dish which is usually cooked with king prawns in a rougaille sauce.

== Method ==
Firstly, a tomato-based sauce called rougaille is prepared. This is a Creole sauce. Prawns are added to the sauce and cooked only for a few minutes to prevent overheating.

== See also ==
- Cuisine of Mauritius
- List of shrimp dishes
