= Mauritian cuisine =

Culinary traditions of Mauritius

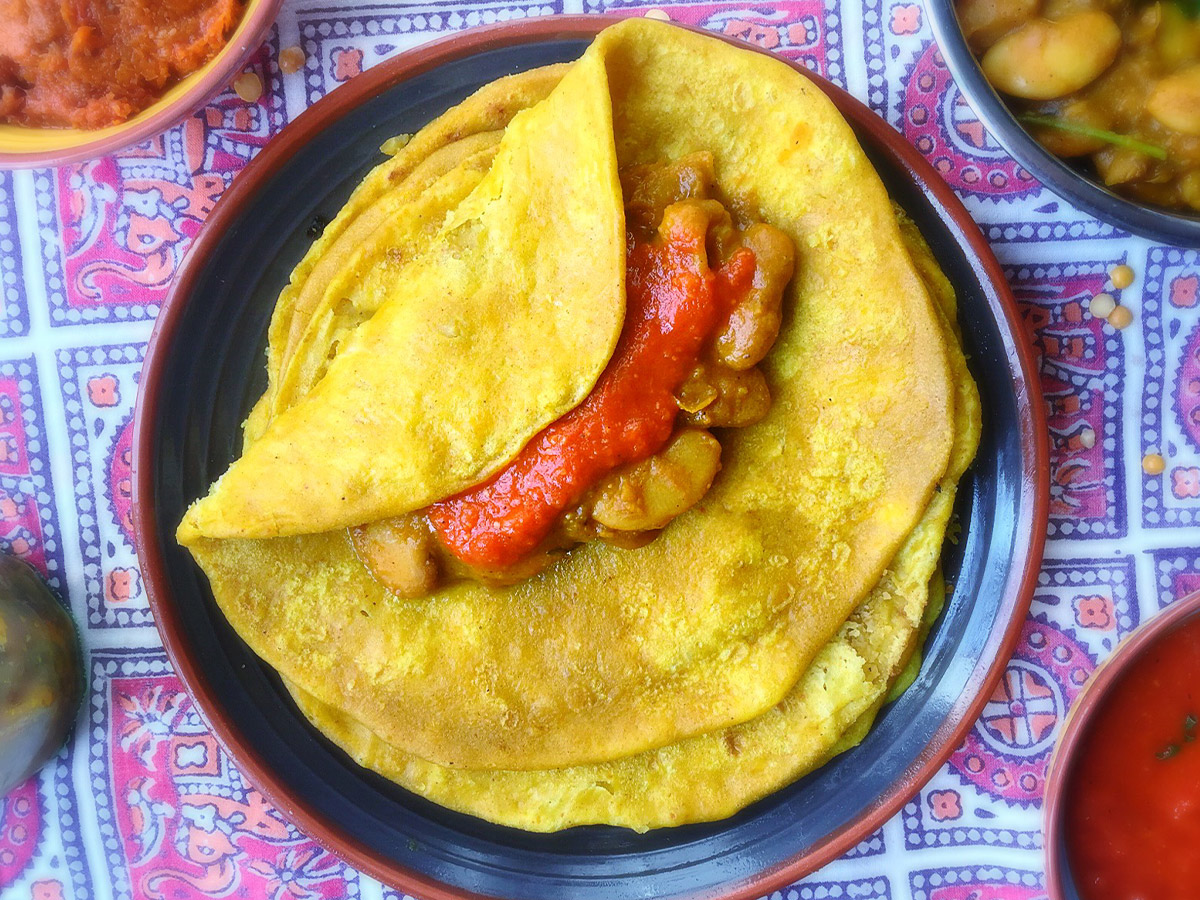
Open Mauritian dalpuri

The cuisine of Mauritius reflects the island’s tropical environment and its long history of cultural diversity. Mauritian food traditions incorporate elements of a variant derived from African cuisine—locally called Creole cuisine, Chinese cuisine—mainly including Hakka & Cantonese cuisines, European cuisine—particularly French, British, Italian & Mediterranean cuisines—and also Indian cuisine—especially Bihari, Uttar Pradeshi, Tamil, Telugu, Marathi (Mumbai), Odia & other regional cuisines of India; reflecting the various groups that settled on the island.

Dishes and culinary customs developed through the interactions of different groups on the island, including those of French settlers, African slaves, Indian indentured labourers, and Chinese migrants in the 19th century. Over time, these communities incorporated and adapted each other's food practices, contributing to the formation of Mauritian cuisine.

Some dishes are widely consumed across all ethnic groups, while others remain associated with particular communities for cultural or historical reasons. Regional and community-based culinary traditions include Indo-Mauritian cuisine, Creole cuisine, Sino-Mauritian cuisine and Franco-Mauritian cuisine.

== Common ingredients ==
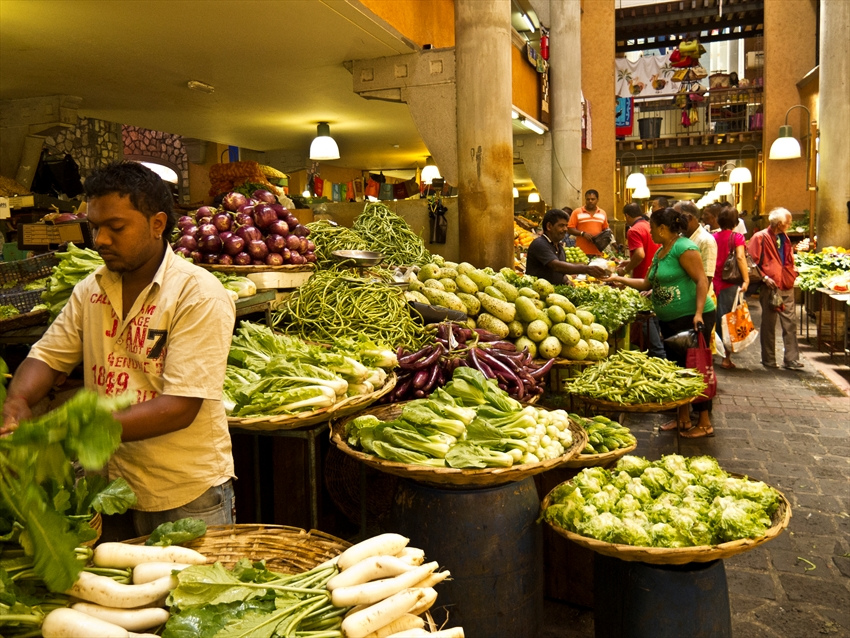
A food market in Port Louis

The most common vegetables used in Mauritian cuisine are tomatoes, onions, okra (Morisyen: lalo), eggplant (brinjal), chayote (chou chou), garlic (lay), and chillies (pima). Rice and seafood, including salted fish, smoked blue marlin, shrimp, octopus, prawns, and crayfish (called camaron) are also staple ingredients used in Mauritian cuisine.

Spices such as chili peppers, cardamom, and cloves are widespread in Mauritian cuisine.

== Common foods ==
=== Staple food ===
Rice is a staple food in Mauritius. It is eaten fried, boiled, or cooked as part of dishes made of vegetables, meat, and seafood.

=== Main and side dishes ===
Chinese noodles (fried or boiled), fried rice (Morisyen: diri frir), bol renversé, fish balls and meatballs with chayote and other vegetables in broth (boulettes), Sino-Mauritian spring rolls, chop suey, halim, biryani (briani or briye), dalpuri served with big pea curry and tomato sauce, roti served with tomato sauce and pickles, curry, and thali (sept-cari) are common Mauritian dishes. Another well-known dish is vinnday or vindaye, a variant of vindaloo made with a mixture of vinegar, mustard seeds, and turmeric.

Mauritius is known for its sauces and curries, which are typically served with meat, seafood, and vegetable dishes. Other common preparations are chutney, achaar, and pickles. Mauritian curries typically do not contain coconut milk, commonly use European herbs (such as thyme), and use a wide variety of meat (such as duck) and seafood (such as octopus). Rougaille (rougail) is a tomato sauce cooked with onions, garlic, chillies, ginger, and a variety of spices, typically eaten with fish, meat, and vegetables. Mauritian versions of curry, chutney, rougail, and pickles differ considerably from the original Indian recipes.

=== Snacks ===
List of common snacks in Mauritius
Name of food	Description
Gato brinzel (lit. eggplant cake)	A snack of Indian origin.
Gato patates (lit. sweet potato cake)	A small, crescent-shaped cake. The dough is made up of boiled sweet potato (patates), flour and sugar. Once the dough is kneaded, it is flattened and cut into small circles which are then filled with grated coconut and sugar. The circles are then closed, which ultimately gives the form of the crescent. These are then deep-fried in oil and can be served hot or cold.
Gato piment (lit. chilli cake)	Chilli fritters made of split peas combined with chilli.
Merveilles	A street food eaten with satini (a form of chutney) or mazavarou (a form of red chilli sauce).
Samosas	A filled dough snack.

=== Desserts and pastries ===
List of common desserts and pastries in Mauritius
Name of food	Description	Image
Biscuit manioc	Made of flavoured manioc biscuit cookies mixed with fresh fruit and ice cream.	
Glason rapé	A form of ice cream made of shaved ice mixed with varieties of syrup flavour, such as vanilla, strawberry, almond, and pineapple.They are made in different forms	
Napolitaine	Made of two sablé biscuits and jam coated with sugar. They originated in Mauritius and are a local pastry despite their French name.	
Poudine maïs (lit. corn pudding), also known as polenta pudding	A sweet dessert often served as a tea-time snack. The Creole community is known for their corn pudding.	

== Common drinks ==
=== Alcoholic drinks ===
List of common alcoholic drinks in Mauritius
Type of drink	Name of drink	Description
Beer	Phoenix	The national beer, which has been produced since the 1960s.
Rum	Green Island	Rum locally manufactured in Mauritius; usually mixed with cold Sprite and a piece of lemon.

=== Non-alcoholic drinks ===
List of common non-alcoholic drinks in Mauritius
Name of Drink	Description	
Alouda	Alouda is a sweet, cold beverage made with milk, tukmaria (basil seeds), and slices of coloured agar-agar jelly, often found in almond and vanilla flavours.	
Coffee	Coffee is one of the most common beverages. Coffee is locally produced in Mauritius.	
Mousse noir	Translated as 'black jelly'; a cold drink of Chinese origins made of grass jelly in water and sugar or syrup water.	
Panacon	A cold beverage prepared in religious ceremonies like cavadee and possibly a variant of the Tamil beverage panakam; made with tamarind, sugar, lemons and cardamon.	
Tea	Tea is one of the most common beverages. Tea drinking is well anchored in Mauritian tradition with an average yearly tea consumption of about one kilo per head. The average Mauritian drinks black tea. Tea is locally produced in Mauritius. Teas produced in Mauritius are often flavoured with vanilla.	
Tea	Bubble tea	The first bubble tea shop in Mauritius opened in late 2012 and since then, there are bubble tea shops in most shopping malls on the island.

== History ==
=== Dutch influences ===
During the Dutch period (1598–1710 AD), sugarcane from Java was first introduced to the island. At the time, sugarcane was mainly cultivated for the production of arrack, a precursor to rum. Cane sugar was not produced until 60 years later.

In 1639, deer from Java were brought to Mauritius by the Dutch governor, Adrian Van Der Stel, as livestock. Following a cyclone, the deer broke free and returned to the wild.

=== French and British influences ===
==== Franco-Mauritian cuisine ====
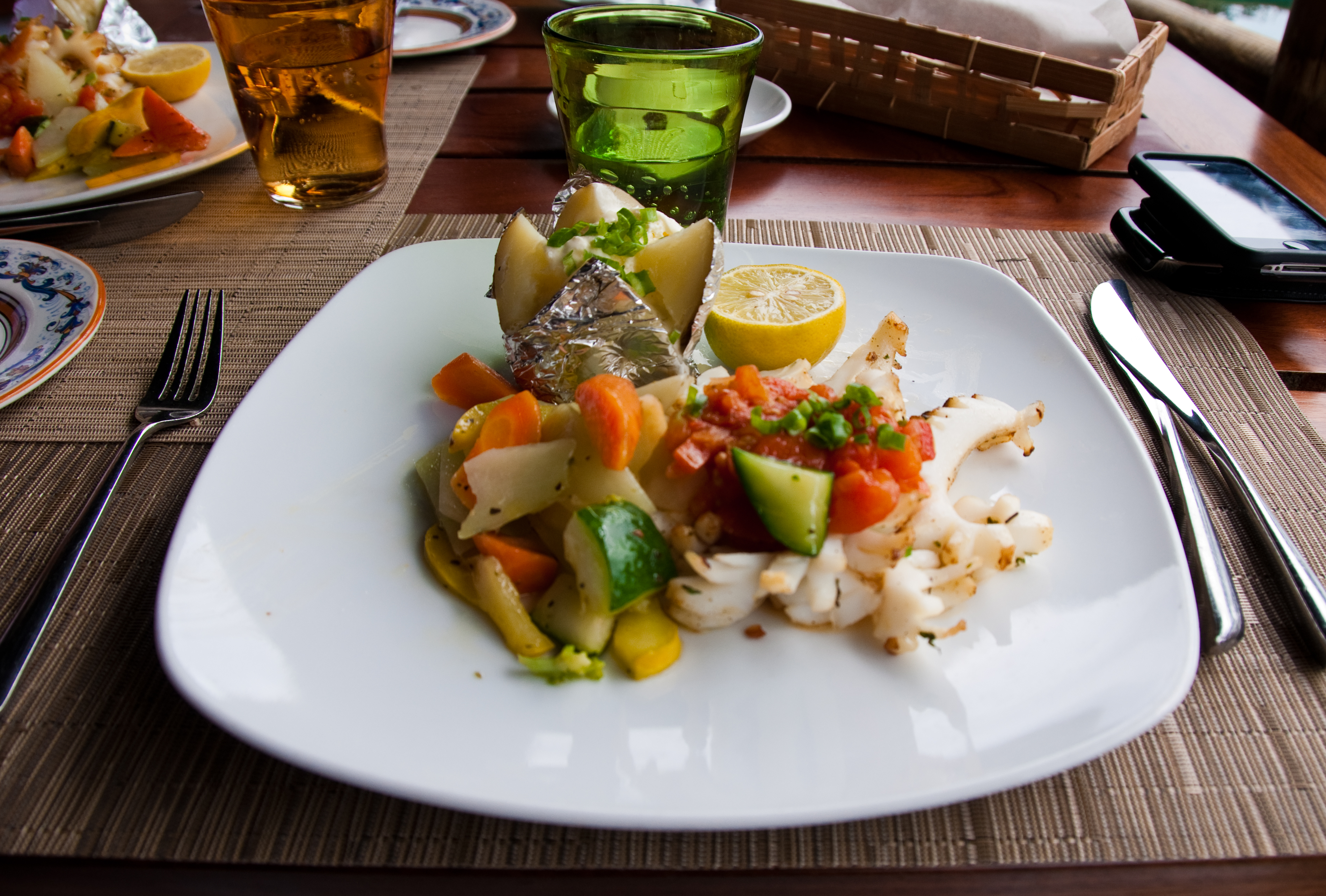
A fish dish at a restaurant in Mauritius

Mauritius has had strong cultural ties with France as a result of its colonial past and was deeply influenced by the French people's savoir-vivre. French hunting traditions have also influenced Mauritian cuisine in the use of venison and wild boar, which are typically served on domains or estates, restaurants and hotels. As years passed by, some have been adapted to the more exotic ingredients of the island to confer some unique flavor. French influences in Mauritian cuisine can be found in the consumption of rougail (light stew) scented with thyme, daube (chicken or beef stew), croissants, baguette, bouillon, salade de thon, civet de lièvre and coq au vin served with good wine. Many forms of French desserts and cakes were influenced by the Franco-Mauritians and can also be found in France, such as tarts. French tarts and milk coffee are well-liked by Franco-Mauritians.

List of Franco-Mauritian dishes
Types of food		List of food
Savoury dishes	Stew	civet de lièvre; coq au vin; daube (i.e. chicken or beef stew); rougaille (light stew) scented with thyme
Savoury dishes	Soup	bouillon
Salads	Fish-based	salade de thon
Bread		baguette; pain maison/rond
Desserts and pastries		croissants; pain au chocolat; pain aux raisins; tarts; i.e. French tarts
Drinks	Non-alcoholic	Milk coffee/café au lait; Hot chocolate/chocolat chaud
Drinks	Alcoholic	Wine/vin

==== Anglo-Mauritian cuisine ====
The liking for afternoon tea in Mauritius is an influence from the British who took over the island in 1810.

=== Sino-Mauritian cuisine ===
Sino-Mauritian cuisine includes both Chinese cuisine (transmitted from their ancestors and recently learnt through journeys to China) and localization of Chinese cuisine. Sino-Mauritian cuisine typically consist of fried vegetables, oyster sauce, fried rice, meat, and fish.

The 19th century saw the arrival of Chinese migrants, who came mostly from the southeastern part of China; these Chinese migrants were mainly Cantonese from Guandong, Hakka from Meixian, and Chinese people from Fujian. Chinese migrants mainly lived in harmony in the Chinatown in the capital of Port Louis and shared their culture with other communities. They are largely credited for making noodles, both steamed and fried, and fried rice popular. Sino-Mauritians also follow or have maintained some Chinese food traditions and customs, such as the tradition of Chinese red eggs, which are shared with family members. It is customary for them to eat fried noodles during birthday celebrations.

Between the 20th and 21st centuries, some Sino-Mauritians returned to China to learn new culinary dishes and returned to Mauritius, introducing new dishes in their restaurants in Mauritius. In the 21st century, Sino-Mauritians, who resided overseas (e.g., in China, Taiwan) for a few years before returning to Mauritius, also introduced new Chinese food and drink culture in Mauritius. For example, bubble tea drinking culture was introduced by Fabrice Lee, a Sino-Mauritian, who lived in Taiwan for 8 years before returning to Mauritius. The first bubble tea shop in Mauritius opened in late 2012; since then, there have been bubble tea shops in most shopping malls on the island.

List of Sino-Mauritian dishes
Type of Food		List of food
Appetizers	Egg-based	dizef roti
Appetizers	Fried appetizers	chipek or sipek, (also called croustillants au tapioca in French), crispy chicken (碎炸香子鸡); crispy squids (椒盐鱿魚球); fried wantan; Hakien, a spring roll with flour batter replacing the traditional rolled wrapping)
Pastries and snacks	Sweet	almond biscuits; putou chinois; gato zinzli or jian dui; called gato zinzli (Chinese: 煎丸欸) by Sino Mauritians; mooncakes; both Hakka and Cantonese versions are found on Mauritius; gato lacire; gato macaroni; tangyuan; teosa, a flaky pastry filled with sweet bean paste
Pastries and snacks	Savoury	gato crab
Pastries and snacks	Both sweet and savoury	gato cravat
Dimsum-like dishes	Chinese dumplings, generally referred as "boulettes"	fish balls, boulette la viande served in broth, niouk yen (boulette chouchou in French; lit. "chayote balls"); siumai (also written as "saw maï"); teokon (a variety of tofu)
Dimsum-like dishes	Filled buns	baozi or bao
Main dishes	Mines (Chinese noodles)	boiled noodles; mines frites; meefoon; yee-mine
Main dishes	Rice	white rice (白飯) plain steamed rice – a staple food; bol renversé (lit. inverted bowl or upside-down bowl) – a local interpretation of a Chinese dish composed of rice and vegetables at the base, a layer of meat or shrimp and a fried egg as a topping; diri frir; moonfan; zong
Side dishes	Poultry	Chicken in Sichuan sauce (川辣炒鸡片); Chicken sweet and sour (糖醋鸡)
Side dishes	Duck	Peking duck
Side dishes	Fish	Sweet and sour fish (糖醋淋班球)
Side dishes	Beef	Sizzling beef with shallot and ginger (鐵板姜葱滑牛片)
Side dishes	Beef	Black pepper beef
Side dishes	Mixed vegetables and meat-based	chop suey: Chicken chop suey (炒什絮鸡片)
Soups	Dumplings	Sui kiow
Soups	Dumplings	Moon kiow
Soups	Poultry and vegetables	Chinese corn soup: Chicken and corn soup (粟米鸡粒羹)
Soups	Pork and vegetables	Hamchoy broth with pork (肉咸菜湯)
Soups	Seafood-based	abalone soup; fish ball soup (鱼旦湯); shark fin soup
Drinks	Cold drinks	bubble tea (introduced to Mauritius in 2012); mousse noir (lit. "black jelly") made of grass jelly in water and sugar or syrup water
Drinks	Hot drinks	green tea
Sauces and condiments	Oyster sauce	

Sino-Mauritian festival foods

List of Sino-Mauritian dishes associated with traditional Chinese holidays and festivals
Name of Festival or Holidays	Name of food
Chinese New Year	chipeks or sipeks (also called croustillants au tapioca in French); putou chinois; gato crab; gato cravat; gato lacire; gato macaroni; gato zinzli; teosa, a flaky pastry filled with sweet bean paste
Lantern Festival	tangyuan
Dragon Boat Festival	zongzi
Fete mines or Guan di Birthday	fried noodles
Mid-Autumn Festival	mooncakes

Chinese and other Asian restaurants are present all around the island and offer a variety of chicken, squid, beef and fish dishes, most typically prepared in black bean sauce or oyster sauce. Mauritian families often consider a dinner at an Asian restaurant to be a treat.

=== Indo-Mauritian cuisine ===
Following the abolition of slavery, Indian workers who migrated to Mauritius during the 19th century brought their cuisine with them. These indentured labourers came from different parts of India with varying culinary traditions. Traces of both northern and southern Indian cuisine can be found in Mauritius. As they are the largest ethnic group in Mauritius, they are largely credited for making flour and rice the staple dish of the island.

Indo-Mauritian cuisine uses common ingredients, such as dals, to accompany the dishes, and an extensive array of spices such as saffron, cinnamon, cardamon, and cloves.

List of Indo-Mauritian food
Type of Food	List of Food
Yellow split pea-based	Dalpuri – a cooked flatbread dish stuffed with yellow split peas, served with big pea curry and tomato sauce
Flour-based	Puri; Roti; Chapati; Faratha
Rice-based	Briani or briye; Pulao
Side dishes	Cari, including the 7-cari (thali), which is traditionally served during Indian weddings in Mauritius; Rougaille
Pickles	Vegetable pickle – made of shredded cabbage, carrots, beans and cauliflower, cooked with garlic and onions
Snacks	Ghantia; Chana puri – fried flour-based ball stuffed with yellow split peas; Gato pima (lit. chilli cake) – a variant of Indian vada; Gato arouy - taro roots fritters; Gato lisou – cabbage fritters; Gato pomdeter – fried potato cake; Gato brinzel - fried eggplant cake; Dipein frir (lit. fried bread) – a variant of Indian bread pakora; Poutou- steamed rice-based snack (not to be confused with Sino-Mauritian putou chinois or putou rouge); Samosa – usually stuffed with pea and potato and flavoured with spices
Sweets	Gulab jamun; Rasgula; Ladoo; Barfi; Sutalfine; Kulfi
Condiments	Satini, including chili-coconut chutney

=== Mauritian Creole cuisine ===
Mauritian Creole dishes typically contain seafood, pulses, beans, corn and tapioca.

List of Mauritian Creole cuisine
Name of Food	Description
Rougaille Creole	A spicy tomato sauce with meat or fish
Rougaille touni (Naked Rougaille)	A plain tomato rougaille which can be served as a side dish.
Vindaye	Deep fried fish coated with a mixture of turmeric, mustard seeds, ginger, and chillies. Blanched octopus can also be used instead of fish.
Poudine maïs (lit. Corn pudding)	A widespread dessert of the Mauritian Creole community.
Poudine manioc (lit. Tapioca pudding)	Another widespread dessert of the Mauritian Creole community.

== Beverage industry in Mauritius ==
=== Rum industry ===
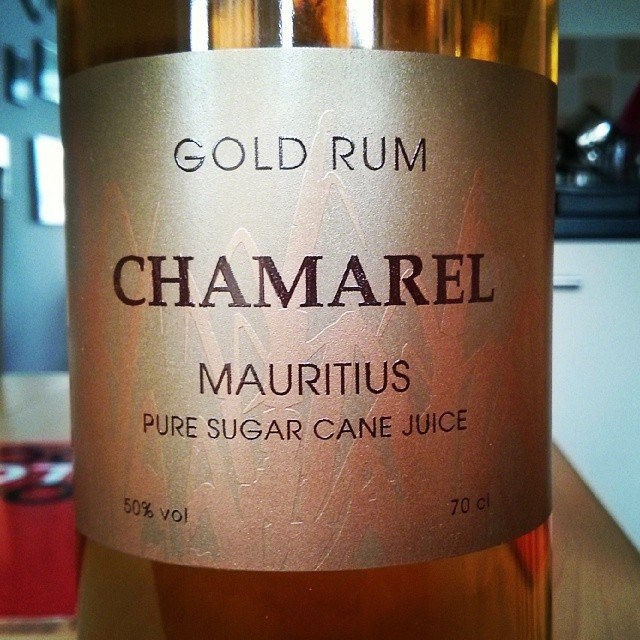
Rum from Mauritius

François Mahé de Labourdonnais was the first person to support the development of rum industry in Mauritius. When Mauritius became a British colony, the plantation economy was mainly sugar cane. It was Dr. Pierre Charles François Harel who, in the 1850s, initially proposed the concept of local distillation of rum in Mauritius. Mauritius today houses four distilleries (Grays, Medine, Chamarel and St Aubin) and is in the process of opening an additional three.

=== Tea industry ===
The tea plant was introduced in Mauritius in 1760 by a French priest, Father Galloys. In 1770, Pierre Poivre planted tea plants on a large scale. However, it was only in the 19th century under British rule that commercial tea cultivation was encouraged by Robert Farquhar, the Governor of Mauritius, but this only lasted during his governance. Sir John Pope Hennessy, the 15th Governor of Mauritius, later revived local interest in tea cultivation and created tea plantations at Nouvelle France and at Chamarel.

== Gallery ==
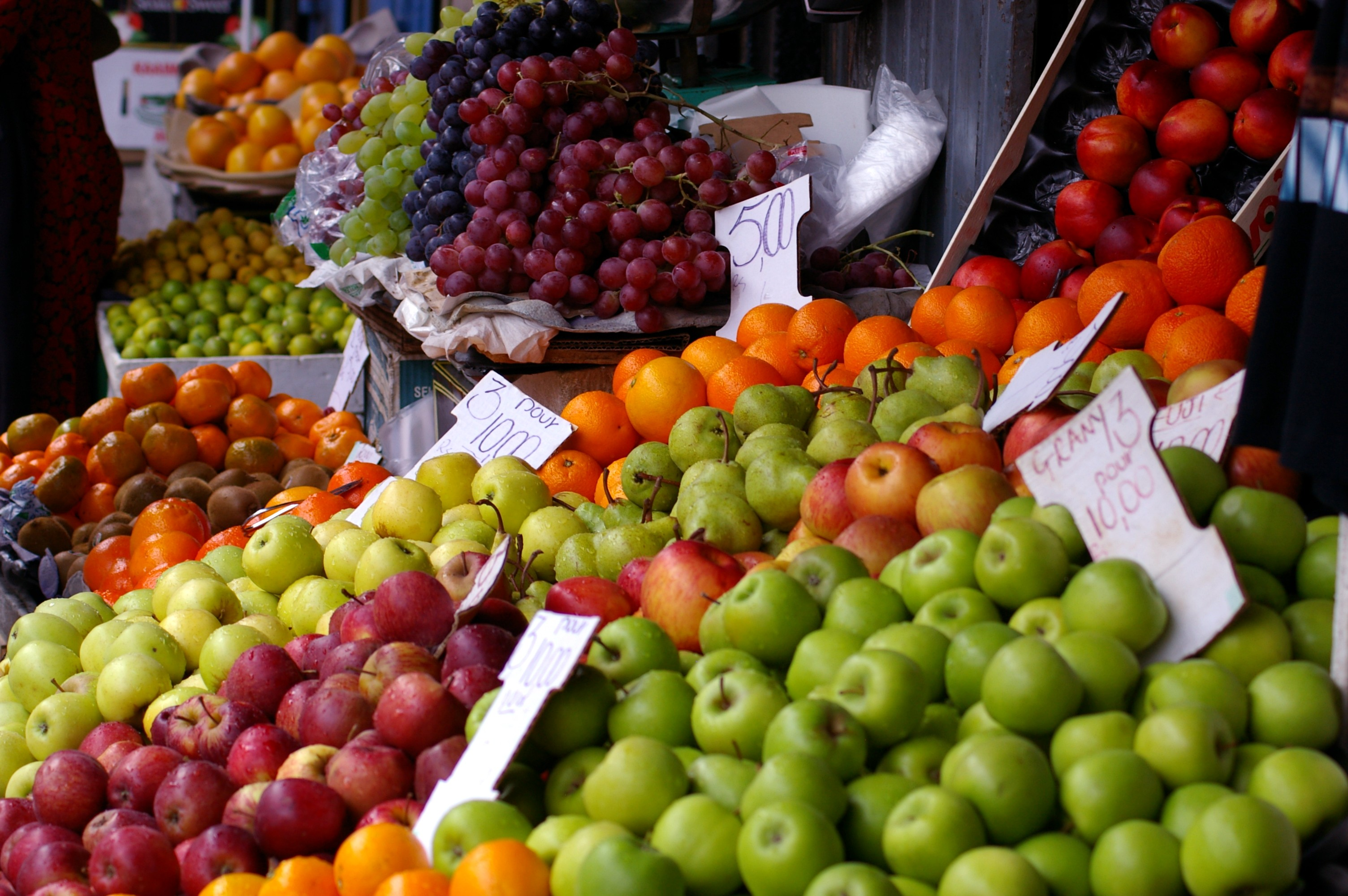
A fruit stand in Mauritius

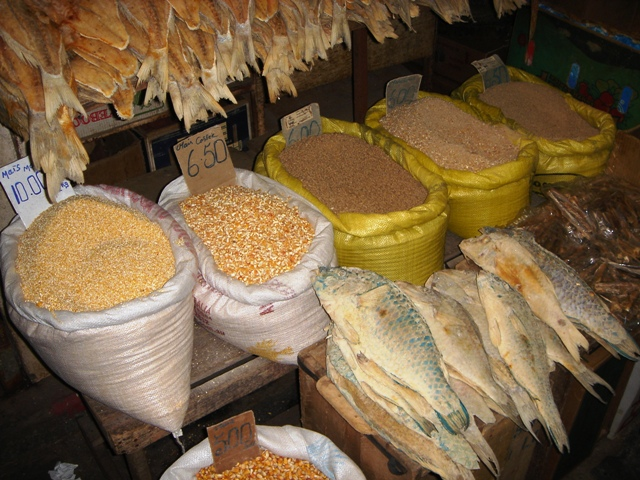
Foods at Port Louis Central Market

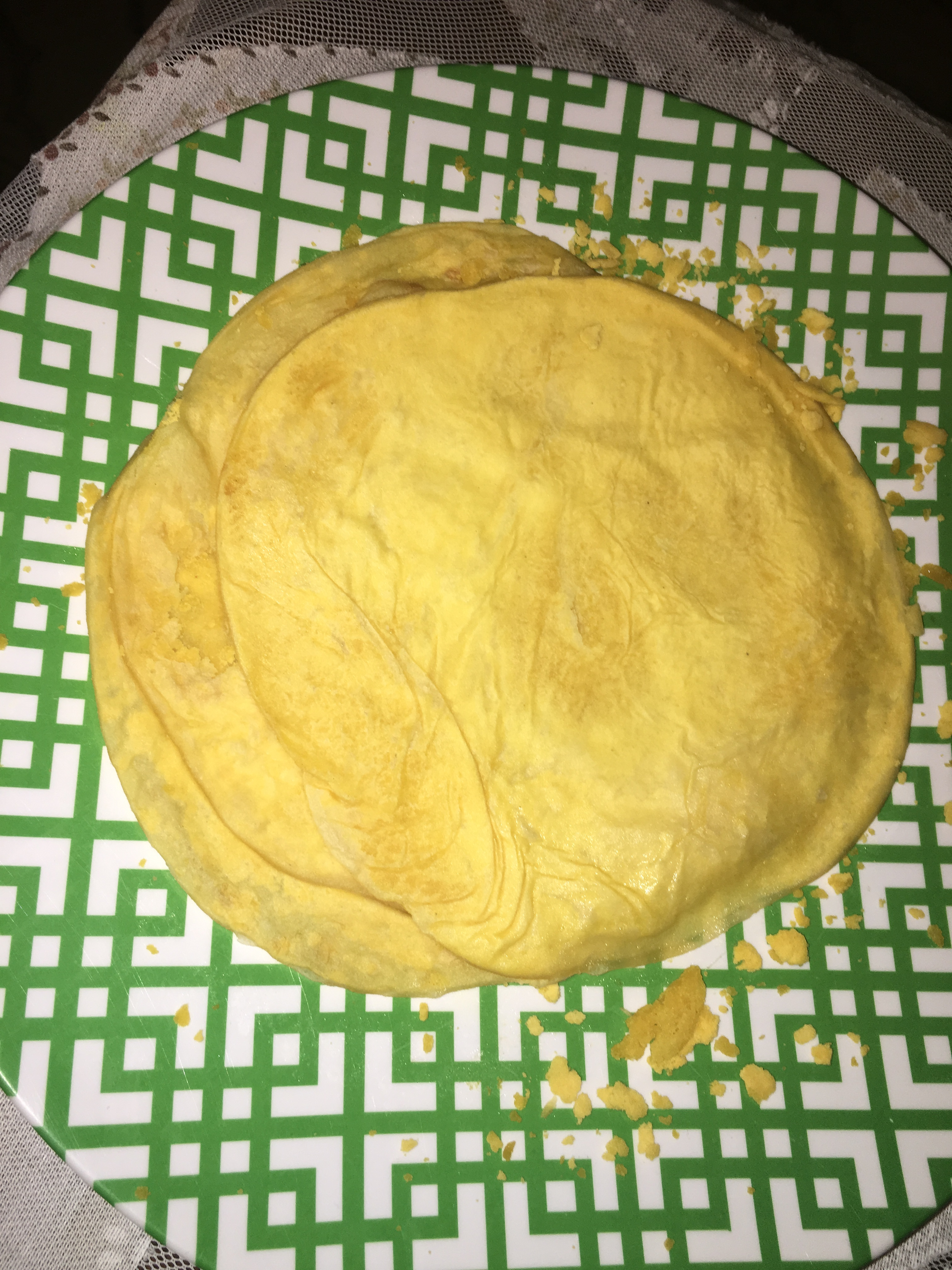
Mauritian dalpuri

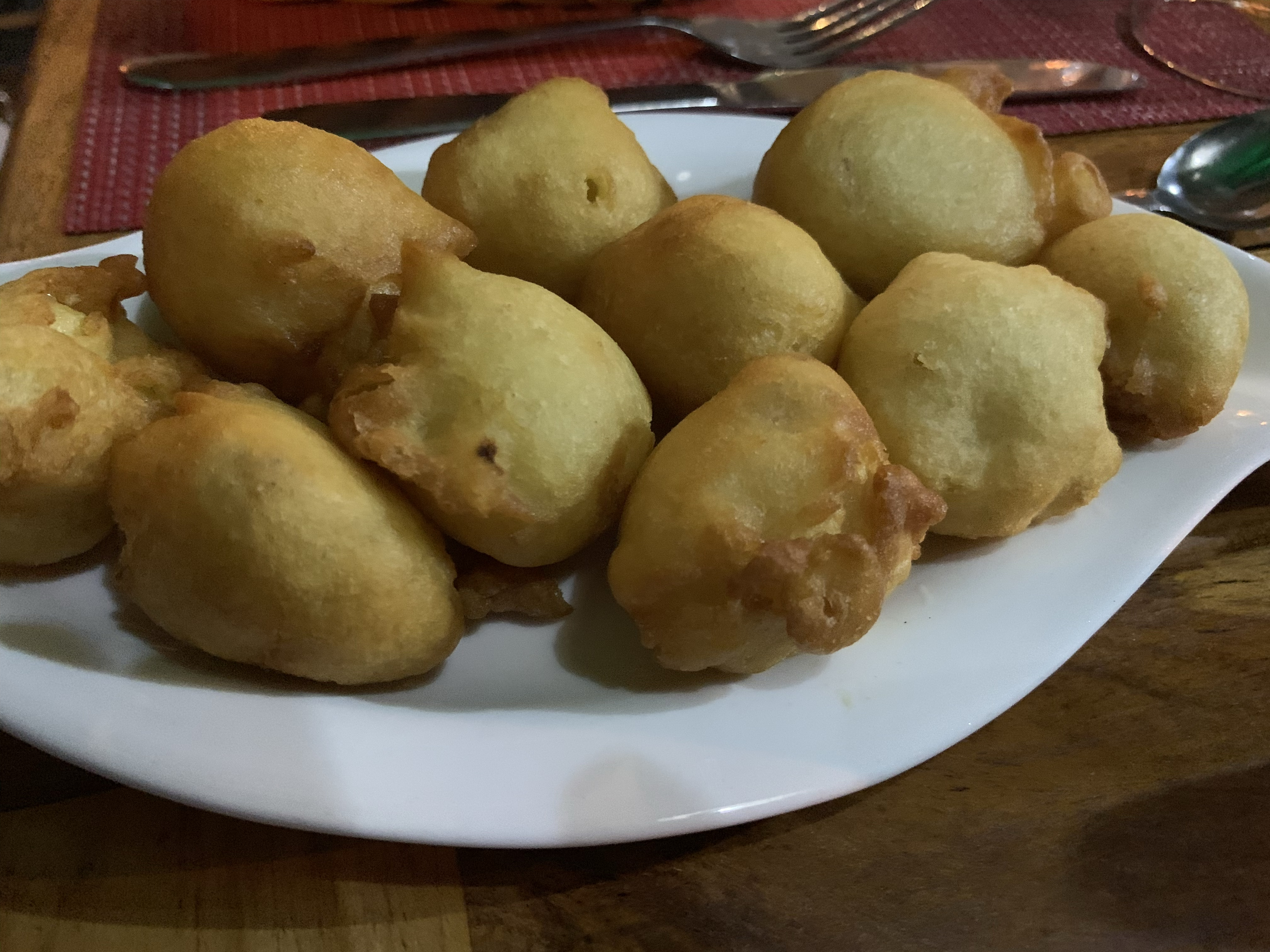
Fish fritters

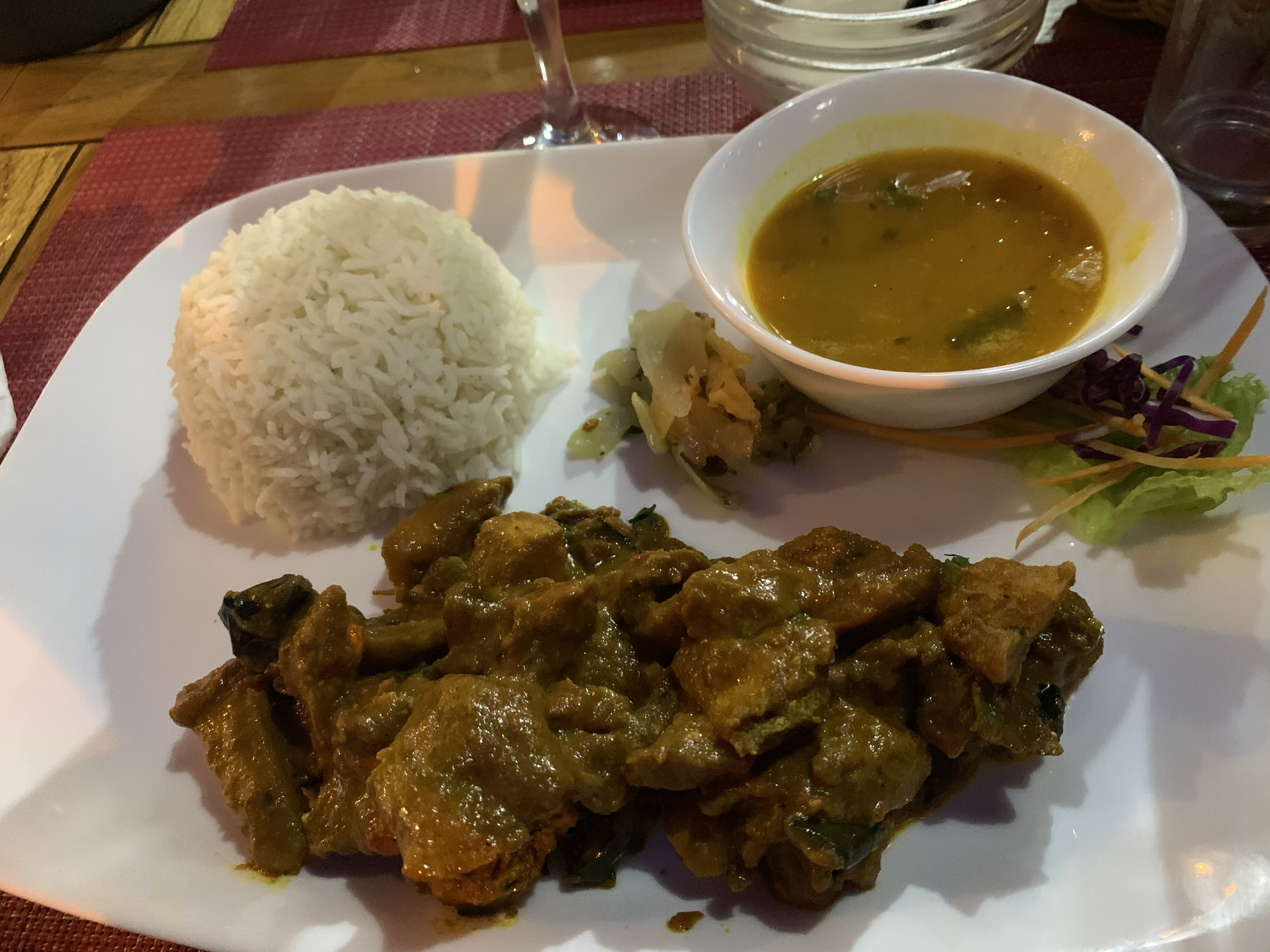
Fish curry

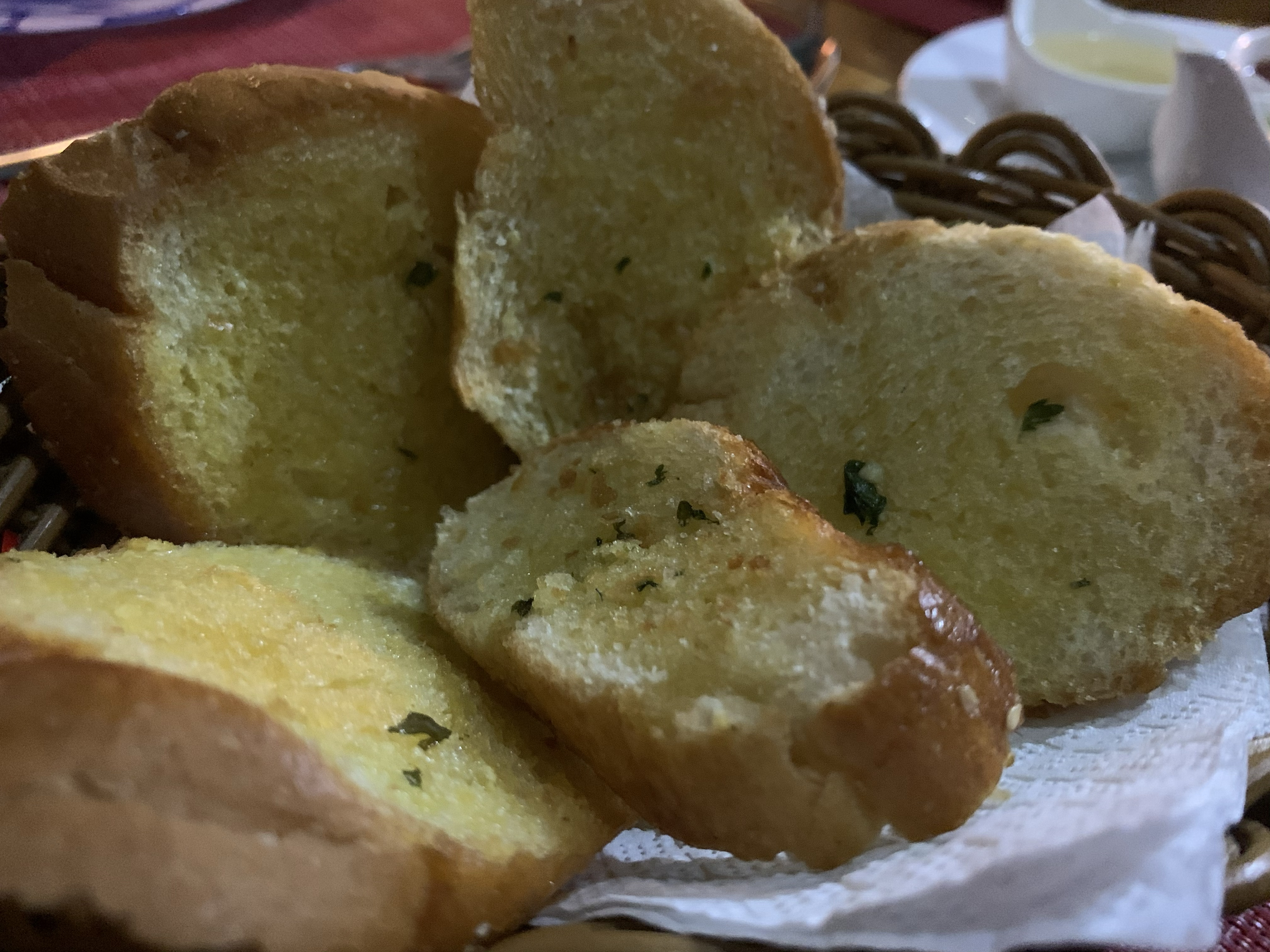
Garlic bread

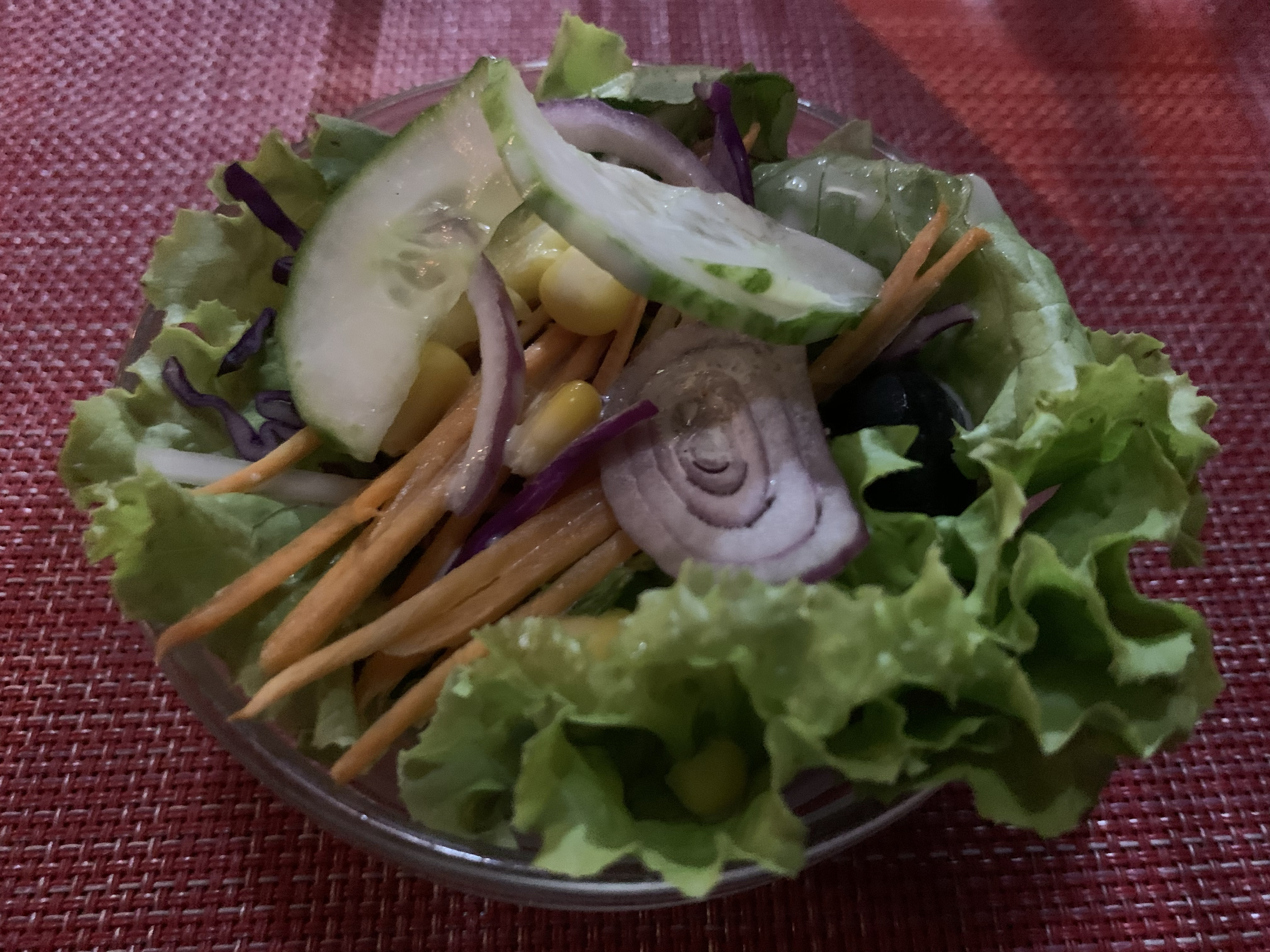
Small salad

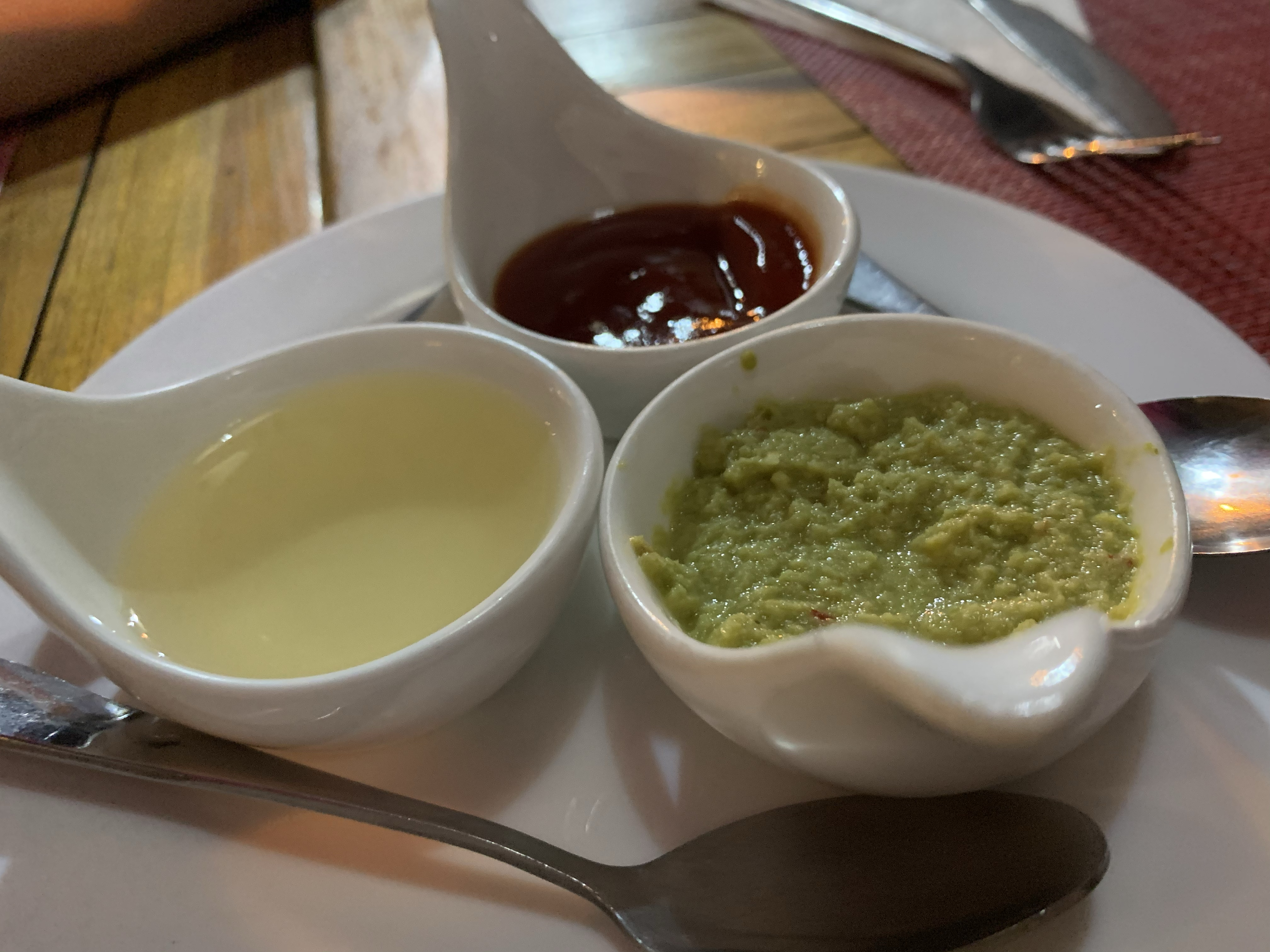
Garlic sauce, green chilli sauce and ketchup (condiments)

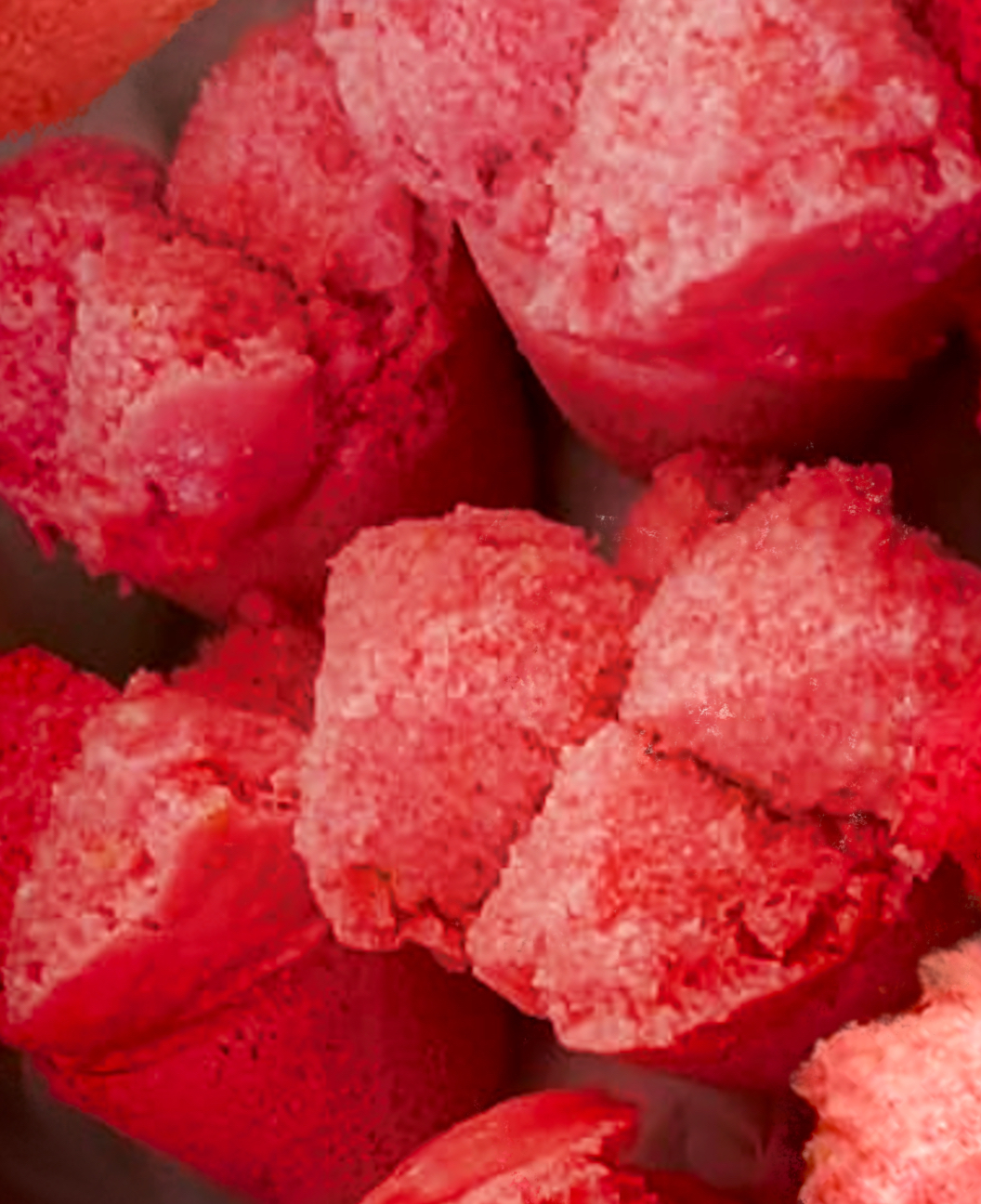
Poutou chinois (rice cake)

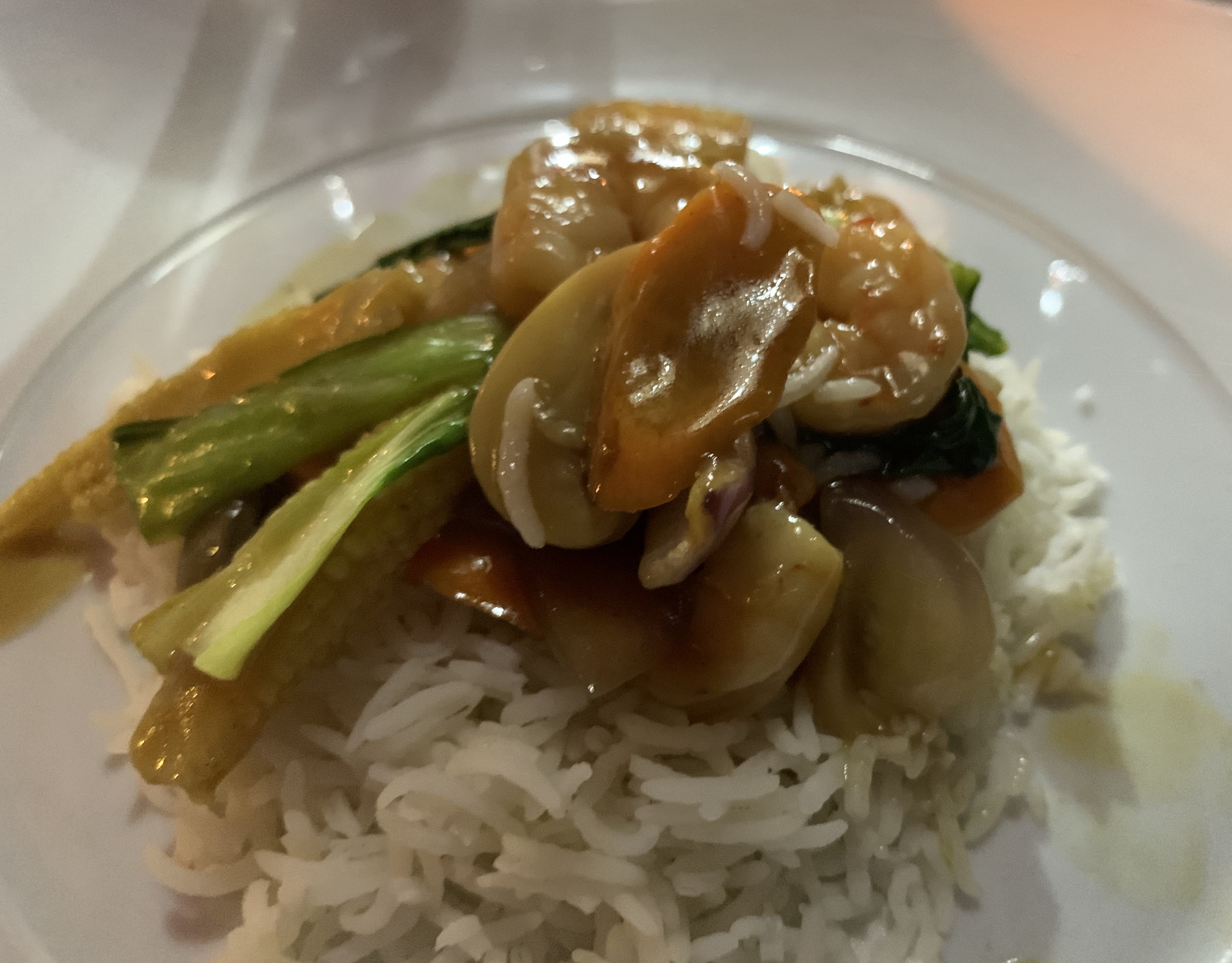
Chop suey shrimp

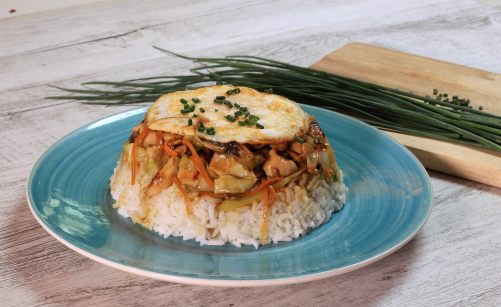
Bol renversé

== See also ==
- Culture of Mauritius
