= Risper Alaro =

Kenyan accountant and corporate executive

- Born: c. 1974 (age 51–52); Kenya
- Education: Moi University; United States International University Africa; Association of Chartered Certified Accountants
- Occupations: Accountant, businesswoman and corporate executive
- Years active: 2002–present
- Title: Group finance Director at Centum Investments

Risper Alaro is an accountant, businesswoman and corporate executive in Kenya. In March 2022, she was appointed as the group finance director at Centum Investments, a publicly traded private equity company in Kenya. The shares of stock of Centum Investments trade on both the Nairobi Stock Exchange and on the Uganda Securities Exchange. Alaro was expected to take up her new appointment on 15 March 2022.

She previously served as the managing director at Centum Business Solutions Limited, a subsidiary of Centum Investments. She is reported to have taken a sabbatical leave from there in 2018.

== Background and education ==
Alaro was born in Kenya in the 1970s. She obtained her first degree, a Bachelor of Arts in Business Administration (BA), from the Moi University, in Eldoret, Kenya. Her second degree, a Master of Business Administration (MBA), was obtained from United States International University Africa, in Nairobi, Kenya's capital city. She is a Fellow of the Association of Chartered Certified Accountants (FCCA), of the United Kingdom and a member of the Institute of Certified Accountants of Kenya (ICPAK).

== Work experience ==
Alaro started her career in 2002, as a financial accountant at Centum Investments at their offices in Nairobi. She was promoted to finance manager in 2007 and to operations and finance director in 2013.

In 2014, Alaro was part of the team that established Centum Business Solutions Limited, serving as the managing director of that subsidiary for four years. In 2018, she took sabbatical leave from her employer.

As the Group CFO, she was to replace Wambua Kimeu, who was scheduled to leave that position at the end of May 2022.

== Other considerations ==
Alaro is a certified executive coach. As of March 2022, she serves as a non-executive director on the boards of Nairobi Securities Exchange, Kenya Climate Ventures, and Bank of Kigali. She is a Desmond Tutu Fellow, Class of 2014.
