= Tetu Constituency =

Electoral constituency in Kenya

Tetu
- constituency for the Parliament of Kenya
- Tetu Constituency within Nyeri County

- Nyeri County within Kenya
- County: Nyeri
- Population: 80,453
- Area: 217 km^{2} (83.8 sq mi)

Current constituency
- Number of members: 1
- Party: UDA
- Member of Parliament: Geoffrey Wandeto Mwangi
- Wards: 3

Tetu Constituency is an electoral constituency in Kenya. It was established in 1988 and is one of the six constituencies in Nyeri County.

Tetu Constituency comprises the Tetu Division of Nyeri County and is located entirely within the Nyeri County Council area. Tetu constituency has only three Wards, the least number of wards out of the constituencies in Nyeri county.

Its most famous representatives include the liberal leader of the Mau Mau, Dedan Kimathi Waciuri (31 October 1920 – 18 February 1957) and Dr. Wangari Maathai (1940-2011), who served for the period between 2002 and 2007. During her period in office she was awarded the Nobel Peace Prize of 2004, being the first African woman to win this award. Dr. Maathai died of cancer within five years of stepping down from this office.

== Members of Parliament ==
Elections	MP	Party	Notes
1988	Nahashon Kanyi Waithaka	KANU	One-party system.
1992	Joseph Gethenji	Democratic Party	
1997	Paul Gikonyo Muya	Democratic Party	
2002	Wangari Maathai	NARC	
2007	Francis Nyammo	PNU	
March 2013	Ndung'u Gethenji	TNA	
August 2017	James Gichuhi Mwangi	JP	
August 2022	Geoffrey Wandeto	UDA	

== Wards ==
Electoral Ward	Population	MCA - Member of County Assembly
Aguthi-Gaaki Ward	26,631	Stanley Ngaru Wakibia
Dedan Kimathi Ward	20,686	Gibson Wahinya Kuria
Wamagana Ward	31,001	Sabastian Mugo Theuri
September 2005,
