= Development Bank of Kenya =

Commercial bank in Kenya

- Industry: Financial services
- Founded: 1963
- Headquarters: Loita Street, Nairobi, Kenya
- Key people: H.K. Mengech (chairman); Victor Kidiwa (chief executive officer)
- Revenue: ▲ Aftertax: US$832,200 (KES:71.953 million (2013)
- Total assets: US$180 million (KES:15.58 billion) (2013)
- Website: devbank.com

Development Bank of Kenya is a commercial bank in Kenya. It is licensed by the Central Bank of Kenya, the central bank and national banking regulator.

== Overview ==
Development Bank of Kenya is a medium-sized financial institution providing an array of financial services to both individuals and businesses. As of December 2013, the total asset valuation of the bank was approximately US$180 million (KES:15.58 billion), with shareholder's equity of about US$21 million (KES:1.822 billion). At that time, the bank was ranked number 26, by assets, among the 43 licensed banks in Kenya.

== History ==
Development Bank of Kenya was established in 1963 as a non-banking financial institution. Its primary focus at that time was to promote and develop commercially viable projects in Kenya. In 1964, it began financing development projects as a development finance institution. As part of the banking reforms of 1996, it converted to a commercial bank and began accepting customer deposits.

== Ownership ==
Shareholding in Development Bank of Kenya at its inception included (a) the Government of Kenya, through the Industrial and Commercial Development Corporation, (b) the British Government, through Commonwealth Development Corporation and (c) the Government of Germany, through the German Investment Corporation. In 1967, the Dutch Government, through the Netherlands Development Finance Company, became the fourth shareholder. In 1981, the World Bank, through the International Finance Corporation, became the fifth shareholder. Over the years, the non-Kenyan shareholders have divested from the bank and shareholding as depicted in the table below:

Development Bank of Kenya stock ownership
Rank	Name of owner	Percentage ownership
1	Industrial and Commercial Development Corporation	89.3
2	TransCentury Investments	10.7
	Total	100.00

== Branch network ==
As of August 2014, the bank maintains its headquarters in Nairobi, Kenya's capital and largest city. It has one branch on the ground floor of its headquarters building.

- Main branch - Finance House, Loita Street, Nairobi

== See also ==
- List of banks in Kenya
- Central Bank of Kenya
- Economy of Kenya
- List of national development banks
