= Anne Kiguta =

Kenyan journalist, talkshow host and news anchor (born 1984)

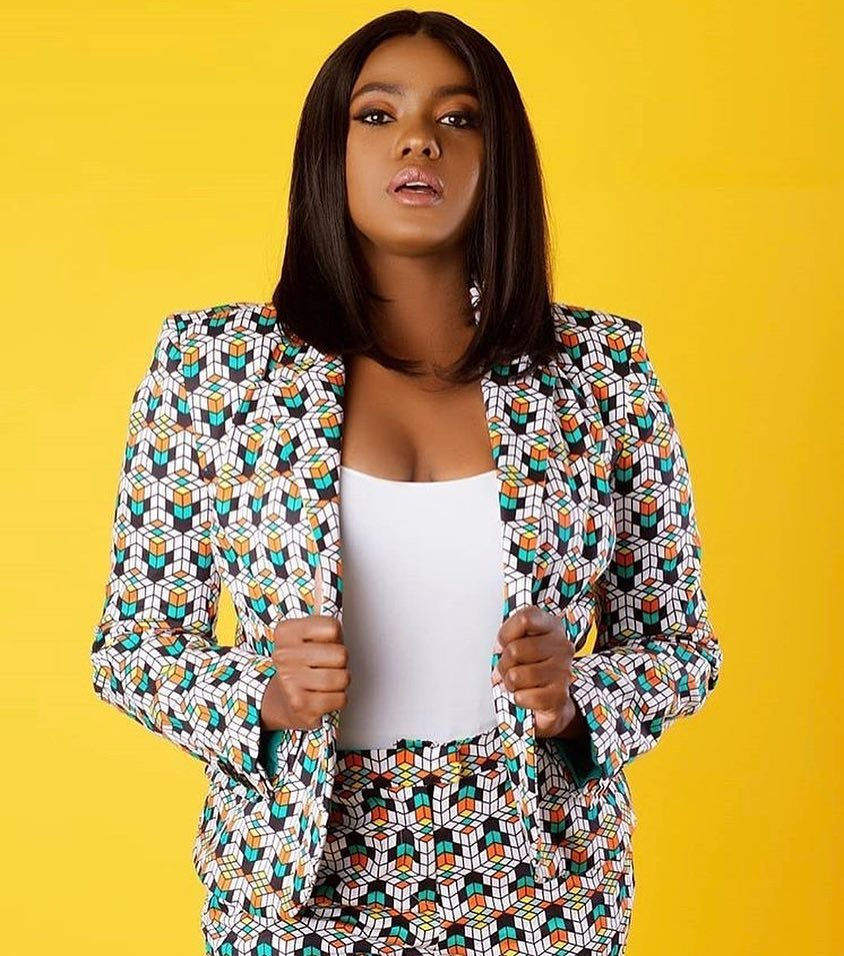
- Born: Anne Nduta Kiguta; 21 November 1984 (age 41); Nairobi, Kenya
- Education: St. Christopher's Preparatory School, Rusinga High School; Daystar University
- Occupations: Radio host; Philanthropist; Journalist; Media personality
- Years active: 2003–
- Website: www.instagram.com/annekiguta twitter.com/AnneKiguta

Anne Kiguta (born 21 November 1984) is a former Kenyan journalist, a talkshow host and a news anchor. She hosted political show at K24 TV Every Sunday at 9 pm. She also previously worked for Hope FM, Capital FM, KTN, and Citizen TV.

== Early life and education ==
Anne Kiguta was born in Nairobi, Kenya to parents who were devoted to the Christian faith and charity. She is the youngest of four daughters. Her mum ran a hospital ministry that would visit the sick and give them food.

She had an inclination towards social work from an early age and hoped to study law after secondary school.

Kiguta attended St. Christopher's Preparatory School before joining the Rusinga High School in Nairobi from year 8 to year 13. She attended Daystar University for her undergraduate degree in Public Relations and Mass Media, clearing campus in 2008.

== Career ==
When she turned 18, her local church started a radio station.The station manager encouraged her to audition. Kiguta was offered the job, which halted her pursuit of a career in law.This began her passion for the Kenyan media industry. At Hope FM she worked as a show host and producer on Plug in and The Top 40 countdown. During the holidays, she interned in Hope FM's newsroom covering the local crime-beat. It is then that her passion for journalism began. Kiguta began anchoring the news bulletin on the breakfast and mid-morning slot while still dabbling in entertainment hosting additional shows on Friday and Saturdays. She remained at Hope FM radio between 2003 and 2006.

Kiguta later went to Capital FM to work as a Senior Anchor and reporter, before her big break in television. Kiguta went on to work at Royal Media Services in October 2013 as the Group Digital Manager and Senior Anchor.

Kiguta is currently the proprietor of a boutique media consultancy AK Consulting. In this capacity, Kiguta produces and hosts Sunday prime time news magazine dubbed Punchline, for K24 TV which covers Kenyan and African political ad economic policy issues. The show features interviews with local and international news and policy makers and has hosted among others the then Deputy President of Kenya HE William Ruto, UNCTAD Secretary General Dr Mukhisa Kituyi, Kenya's Defense Secretary Dr Monica Juma, UN Women Kenya Country Director Anna Mutavati and a host of local and Africa-wide policy including leaders of the Parliament, governors and other policy makers.

=== Television career ===
Kiguta specializes in political and current affairs reportage with a penchant for African issues. Kiguta has interviewed a wide range of global leaders including President Uhuru Kenyatta and a host of Cabinet Secretaries, the late UN Secretary General Kofi Annan, world renown economics Professor Jeffrey Sachs, Prosecutor of the International Criminal Court Luis Moreno Ocampo and US Civil rights Activist Jesse Jackson among others. She has moderated various international forums including the UN Habitat's World Urban Forum and a range of events for UN Women, World Vision, Save the Children among others.

Kiguta hosted KTN's Sunday night programming for three years and by 2012 Citizen TV was looking to strengthen its political desk for election ahead of the 2013 General Election. She was the only woman doing hard political interviews at the time and was at the receiving a lot of criticism for her hard-hitting questions.

Katua Nzile the then managing editor of KTN offered her work as an anchor. She co-anchored interviews on primetime alongside Beatrice Marshall, Michael Oyier and Njoroge Mwaura. She then began anchoring news on Sunday night at the station on a show called Checkpoint with Edward Kisiangani which competed with Sunday Live, the rival program on Citizen TV. The show gained popularity prompting Citizen TV Managing Director Wachira Waruru to headhunt her to join what was then the leading Television station in the region. Kiguta joined Citizen TV and would later take over Monday Special, Sunday Live in addition to Opinion Court. She later exited Citizen in 2019 taking a one-year sabbatical. She then made a TV comeback with a new political show dubbed Punchline which airs Sundays on K24 TV.

== Personal life ==
Kiguta is a mother to three children.

=== Charity work ===
Anne is a speaker, moderator and mentor. She is passionate about working with women and girls. Kiguta was a part of the Standard Group's Eve Sister mentorship program where she went around the country mentoring young girls. She is a child nutrition advocate with Save the Children.
