= Tetu, Kenya =

Sub-county in Nyeri County, Kenya

Coordinates: 0°26′S 36°55′E

Tetu is a sub-county in Nyeri County, Kenya. It is located west of adjacent Nyeri town, the county capital. Tetu Constituency is also the name of the local electoral constituency. As of 2020, Tetu had a total population of 80,453 and a population density 378 of per km^{2}. Tetu is predominantly a rural division without any major central township. Some of the shopping centers with large markets include Muthinga, Gichira, Ithekahuno and Wamagana.

Tetu sub-county is served mainly by Nyeri town due to proximity. Most residents conduct business in Nyeri town as they farm and live in Tetu sub-county.

Famous Kenyans from Tetu include Gakere wa Ngunju, liberation leader Dedan Kimathi and Nobel Peace Prize laureate Wangari Maathai.
