= Patricia Amira =

Kenyan broadcaster and women's rights activist

- Born: Nairobi, Kenya
- Known for: The Patricia Show, a syndicated TV show in Africa
- Awards: Women, Inspiration and Enterprise Media Award, 2013

Patricia Amira is a Kenyan women's and girls' rights advocate, a broadcaster, public speaker and conference moderator, receiving particular recognition for her television show, The Patricia Show, which was syndicated throughout Africa, as well as in Europe and the US, from 2009 to 2013.

== Early life ==
Amira was born in Nairobi, Kenya. She attended the International School of Geneva between 1981 and 1985, the Convent of the Assumption in Richmond, North Yorkshire, England from 1985 to 1988, and Regent's University London from 1989 to 1992.

== Media career ==
In 2000 Amira began working for 98.4 Capital FM, the second independent radio station to be established after the liberalization of the media in Kenya. Later she moved to television, creating, hosting and being responsible for the content of The Patricia Show, which was syndicated across Africa, as well as in Europe and the US, between 2009 and 2013. More recently, she has presented a 3-hour syndicated radio show devoted to a broad range of African music styles.

She has appeared in one film, Rafiki, which was premiered at the 2018 Cannes Film Festival, the first Kenyan film to be shown at the festival. The film is the story of romance between two young women amidst family and political pressures and the debate about LGBT rights in Kenya. Amira played the mother of one of the girls.

== Conference moderation ==
Amira has become a leading moderator of conferences and webinars that have a focus on issues related to least-developed countries, particularly in Africa. Meetings she has moderated have covered a wide range of topics, from agricultural value chains to snakebites. She has worked with organizations such as the African Leadership Network, the World Health Organization, the Bill & Melinda Gates Foundation, the African Academy of Sciences, the University of Oxford, and UN Women.

== Women's rights ==
Amira is co-chair of the board of Equality Now, an international non-governmental organization founded in 1992 to advocate for the protection and promotion of the human rights of women and girls. It works to encourage governments to adopt, improve and enforce laws that protect and promote women's and girls' rights around the world, concentrating on ending sexual violence, ending harmful practices such as child marriage and female genital mutilation, ending sexual exploitation including the trafficking of women and girls, and ending sexual discrimination in law.

== Recognition ==
Amira's work has been recognised by Forbes Africa, which in 2011 considered her to be one of the 40 Most Powerful Media Personalities in Africa. In 2014, Forbes Afrique considered her to be one of the 100 Most Influential Women in Africa. In 2013 she won the Women, Inspiration and Enterprise Media Award.
