= Machakos University =

Public university in Machakos, Kenya

- Motto: Elimu na Ustawi
- Motto in English: Education and Prosperity.
- Type: Public
- Established: 1957; 69 years ago
- Academic affiliations: ACU, IUCEA, AAU
- Chancellor: Dr James Mworia
- Vice-Chancellor: Prof. Joyce Jepkirui Agalo
- Administrative staff: 1,000+ by 2023
- Students: 11,000+ by 2023
- Location: Machakos, Machakos County, Kenya; 1°23′3″S 37°49′46″E
- Campus: Main Campus
- Colors: Patriarch; Gamboge; White
- Nickname: Machaa
- Sporting affiliations: Shanghai University of Sport
- Website: www.mksu.ac.ke

- Location of Machakos University

Machakos University is a public university in Machakos, Kenya. Founded in 1957 as a Technical Rural Training School by the colonial government, it was later renamed Machakos Technical and Trade School in 1958, Machakos Technical School in 1967, and Machakos Technical Training Institute (MTTI) in 1987. In 2011, the institution was upgraded to Machakos University College through Legal Notice No. 130, and it was chartered as a fully-fledged public university on 7 October 2016. Today, the university is located one kilometer from Machakos City along Machakos/Wote Road.

== History ==
Machakos University was founded in 1957 as a Technical Rural Training School by the then colonial government. It was converted into Machakos Technical and Trade School in 1958, Machakos Technical School in 1967, and Machakos Technical Training Institute (MTTI) in 1987.

MTTI was acknowledged for having a strong background in Engineering and Technology, Hospitality and Tourism. The institution was upgraded to Machakos University College through Legal Notice No. 130, on 16 September 2011. The journey towards achieving a full University status started in earnest right at the inception.

Machakos University was chartered on 7 October 2016. Formerly, it was a constituent college of Kenyatta University. The university has a strong pedagogical premise for quality teaching and training in order to achieve its mandate of ensuring accessible, affordable, flexible and relevant academic programmes for the changing socio-economic and other societal needs.

== Student Life ==
Machakos University offers a diverse campus life that provides students with numerous opportunities for personal growth, social interaction, and extracurricular involvement. The university has a diverse student body, with students from different parts of Kenya and other countries.

The university offers a variety of clubs and societies that cater to a range of interests, including sports, music, drama, debate, and entrepreneurship. Students can also participate in cultural events and celebrations, such as the annual Cultural Week, which showcases the diverse cultures of the students and staff.

Machakos University has a range of sports facilities, including a fully equipped gym, sports fields, and courts for basketball, volleyball, and netball. The university participates in various sports competitions, both locally and internationally.

== Administration and organization ==
Machakos University is governed by a council appointed by the Kenyan government, which oversees the activities of the university. The council provides strategic direction, exercises control, and remains accountable.

The university is headed by the vice-chancellor, who is appointed by the council. The current vice-chancellor of Machakos University is Prof. Joyce Agalo. The university also has three deputy vice-chancellors responsible for administration, planning and finance, research, innovation and linkages and academic and student affairs. The current deputy vice-chancellors are Prof Mugendi M'rithaa, Prof. Peter Mwita and Prof. James Muola, respectively.

Machakos University comprises several schools and departments that offer a variety of academic programs at the undergraduate and graduate levels. The schools and departments are:

=== School of Agricultural Sciences, Environment and Health Sciences ===
- Department of Agricultural Studies
- Department of Health Sciences
- Department of Environmental Studies
- Department of Natural Resources

=== School of Business, Economics, Hospitality and Tourism Management ===
- Department of Economics
- Department of Accounting, Banking, and Finance
- Department of Business Administration
- Department of Hospitality and Tourism Management

=== School of Education ===
- Teaching Practice Department
- Department of Educational Psychology and Special Needs Education
- Department of Early Childhood Education and Educational Communication and Technology
- Department of Educational Management and Curriculum Studies

=== School of Engineering and Technology ===
- Department of Mechanical Engineering
- Department of Computing and Information Technology
- Department of Building and Civil Engineering
- Department of Electrical Engineering and Electronics Engineering

=== School of Humanities and Social Sciences ===
- Department of Humanities
- Department of Linguistics and Languages
- Department of Social Sciences

=== School of Pure and Applied Sciences ===
- Department of Biological Sciences
- Department of Physical Sciences
- Department of Mathematics and Statistics

== Collaborations ==
Machakos University has established strategic partnerships and collaborations with various local and international institutions to enhance its academic and research programs. These collaborations are aimed at facilitating the exchange of knowledge, skills, and resources and promoting academic excellence. The university has signed Memorandums of Understanding (MoUs) and entered into other partnership agreements with the following institutions:

- Inades Foundation - Collaborations in academic programs, community health initiatives, research, and capacity building.
- Sapienza University of Rome - Collaborations in research projects, exchange of staff and students, and joint academic programs.
- Konza Technopolis Development Authority - Collaborations in research, technology transfer, training, and institutional exchange.
- Tangaza University - Collaborations in joint academic programs, research, and staff and equipment exchange.
- Shanghai University of Sport - Collaborations in joint academic programs, staff exchange, and collaborative research projects.
- African Mental Health Foundation - Collaborations in research, training, and joint projects.
- KALRO - Collaborations in research, training, and technology transfer.
- Multimedia University of Kenya- Collaborations in research, academic exchange programs, and use of facilities.
- Kenya National Bureau of Statistics - Collaborations in providing practical training opportunities for students and conducting analytical work in the area of statistics and economics.
- Machakos Agricultural Training Centre - Collaborations in equipping trainees with technical knowledge and skills in agriculture and education.
- University of Helsinki - Collaborations in enhancing competencies, methods, and systems in Kenyan universities.
- Catholic Relief Services Kenya - Collaborations in empowering youth and women in agriculture.
- Kenyatta University - Collaborations in mentorship of engineering programs at Machakos University.
- South Eastern Kenya University - Collaborations in staff exchange, research, and use of facilities.
- Machakos Level 5 Hospital - Collaborations in providing clinical exposure and experience for students.
- Seeding Labs - Collaborations in providing laboratory equipment and supplies for research and teaching.
- Comtel Integrators Africa Limited - Collaborations in providing a shared platform for digital signage.
- Kituluni Youth Polytechnic - Collaborations in supporting vocational and allied training programs.
- Higher Education Loans Board - Collaborations in financing students pursuing higher education.

These collaborations have contributed to the growth and development of Machakos University's academic and research programs and have provided valuable opportunities for students and staff to interact with a diverse range of scholars and practitioners.

== Controversy ==
=== Use of student's image in advertising ===
In October 2021, a former Machakos University student, Catherine Njeri, filed a petition alleging that the university used her image in an advertisement without her consent. Njeri claimed that the use of her image violated her fundamental right to privacy and human dignity, as well as her intellectual property rights. Machakos University admitted to using Njeri's image but claimed that it does not engage in commercial or profit-oriented activities. On August 3, 2022, the High Court in Machakos ordered the university to pay Njeri Sh700,000 for violating her intellectual property rights, right of publicity, and personal rights.

== Academics ==
Machakos University Academic Division is composed the schools below:

- School of Engineering and Technology
- School of Business and Economics, Hospitality and Tourism Management
- School of Education
- School of Pure and Applied Sciences
- School of Agricultural, Environmental and Health Sciences
- School of Humanities and Social Sciences

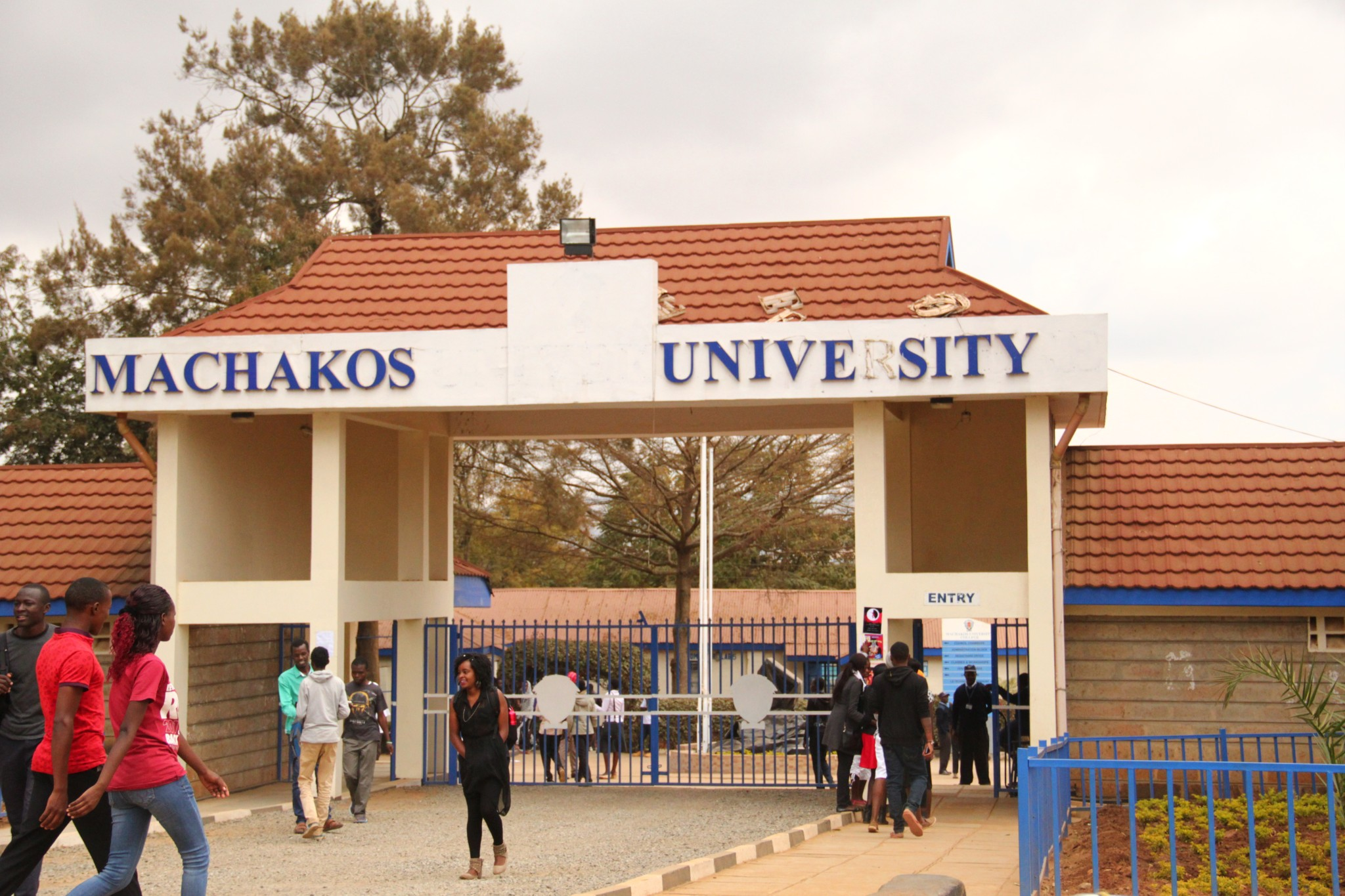
Machakos University gate in 2016
