= TransCentury Limited =

Kenyan infrastructure company

- Type: Public Company; KN: TCL
- Industry: Investments, infrastructure
- Founded: 1997
- Headquarters: 8th Floor; West End Towers; Waiyaki Way; Nairobi, Kenya
- Area served: Sub-Saharan Africa
- Key people: Shaka Kariuki chairman Ng’ang’a Njiinu; CEO
- Products: Private equity, infrastructure
- Revenue: ▼: aftertax KSh.1.983 billion/= (2014)
- Total assets: KSh.19.464 billion/= (December 2014)
- Divisions: Power, transport, and engineering
- Subsidiaries: East African Cables; Tanelec; Kewberg; Cableries du Congo; Avery; Civicon
- Website: transcentury.co.ke

TransCentury Limited is an infrastructure company whose stock is listed on the Nairobi Securities Exchange (NSE) with three divisions across 14 countries in East, Central and Southern Africa.

== Location ==
The company's headquarters are located in Nairobi, Kenya, with subsidiaries in the Democratic Republic of the Congo, Kenya, Mauritius, Tanzania, Uganda, Zambia and South Africa.

== Overview ==
TransCentury is an investment and infrastructure company that has grown from a club of 29 friends worth less than KES 30 million in 1997, to a private equity firm and later listing on the NSE.

As at December 2014, TransCentury's total assets were valued at about KSh.19.464 billion/=, with shareholders' equity valued at approximately KSh.11.482 billion/=. The firm acquired a controlling interest in East African Cables in 2004, Avery in 2005, 34% of Rift Valley Railways in 2006, Tanelec and Kewberg cables in 2007 and Civicon in 2011.

Exited investments include Chai Bora of Tanzania which was acquired in 2008 (it was later sold to Catalyst Principal Partners in 2013 for an undisclosed amount) and a minority stake in Castle Brewery Kenya Limited (an SABMiller subsidiary), which it exited in 2002 when the brewer's parent firm pulled out of the local market after a market truce with EABL. TransCentury exited Rift Valley Railways (RVR) in April 2014 by selling its 34% stake in the Consortium to Citadel Capital of Egypt for an estimated KSh.3.216 billion/= (US$37.8 million). TransCentury first invested in RVR in December 2006 by acquiring a 20% stake in the company, and later increased its shareholding to 34% in May 2010.

In June 2014, TransCentury announced that it was going to invest a substantial sum from the RVR sale in a 35-megawatts geothermal power plant consortium in Menengai.

== Member companies ==
The companies that comprise the TransCentury Group of companies include, but are not limited, to the following, as of 31 December 2016.

- East African Cables – Nairobi, Kenya: TransCentury's first major investment. It is a cable manufacturing company that is listed on the NSE as CABL. It has subsidiaries in Kenya and Tanzania and distribution networks across the Eastern Africa region. In 2014, TransCentury owned 64.3 percent of East African Cables. On 26 February 2014, TransCentury announced that it was in talks with Aureos East Africa Fund LLC to acquire all of the shares held by Aureos in East African Cables in exchange for shares of the company, by way of a share swap. This transaction increased the group's shareholding in East African Cables to 68.38%.
- East African Cables Tanzania Limited – Dar es Salaam, Tanzania. East African Cables holds 51.4% of this Tanzanian subsidiary. This gives TransCentury 35.2% controls of East African Cables Tanzania Limited.
- Avery (East Africa) Limited – Nairobi, Kenya: Avery supplies, manufactures, maintains and repairs weighing scales. TransCentury owns 94.4% of Avery.
- Civicon – Mombasa, Kenya: Civicon Limited is an engineering firm. It has operations in Kenya, Uganda, Tanzania, Rwanda, Burundi, Ethiopia, Djibouti, Congo DR and South Sudan. Its capabilities include oil and gas, power, industrial installations, specialised transport, roads, bridges, other civil works, and mining. In 2013, Civicon won a lucrative contract that involved building of roads, airstrips and other supporting infrastructure around Tullow Oil's exploration blocks in northern Kenya. TransCentury owns a controlling stake in Civicon.
- Kewberg – Johannesburg, South Africa: Kewberg Cables & Braids Proprietary Limited is a leading manufacturer of instrumentation and control cables, mining and other specialised cables manufactured according to customer specifications. TransCentury own 100% of Kewberg.
- Tanelec – Arusha, Tanzania: Tanelec Limited offers comprehensive repair and service on switchgears and transformers. The company services Tanzania, Kenya, Uganda and Zambia. TransCentury owns 70% of Tanelec.
- Cableries Du Congo – Kinshasa, DR Congo: A cable manufacturing and distribution company. TransCentury owns 100% of Cableries Du Congo.
- Development Bank of Kenya – Nairobi, Kenya: A commercial bank in Kenya whose primary focus is to promote and develop commercially viable projects in Kenya. TransCentury owns 10.70% of Development Bank of Kenya with the balance held by ICDC.

== Ownership ==
The shares of the TransCentury are listed on the Nairobi Securities Exchange under the symbol TCL. As of December 2014, the shareholding of TransCentury was as follows:

TransCentury stock ownership
Rank	Name of owner	Percentage ownership
1	Kuramo Africa Ke15615	76
2	Standard Chartered Nominees A/C	14.58
3	Anne Pearl Karimi Gachui	8.57
4	Michael Gitau	6.59
5	Peter Tiras Kanyago	5.74
6	Others	58.39
	Total	100.00

== Governance ==
TransCentury is governed by an eight-person board of directors, with Shaka Kariuki as the chairman and Ng’ang’a Njiinu as the CEO.

== See also ==
- Nairobi Securities Exchange
- Rift Valley Railways
- List of conglomerates in Africa
