= Chris Kirubi =

Kenyan businessman (1941–2021)

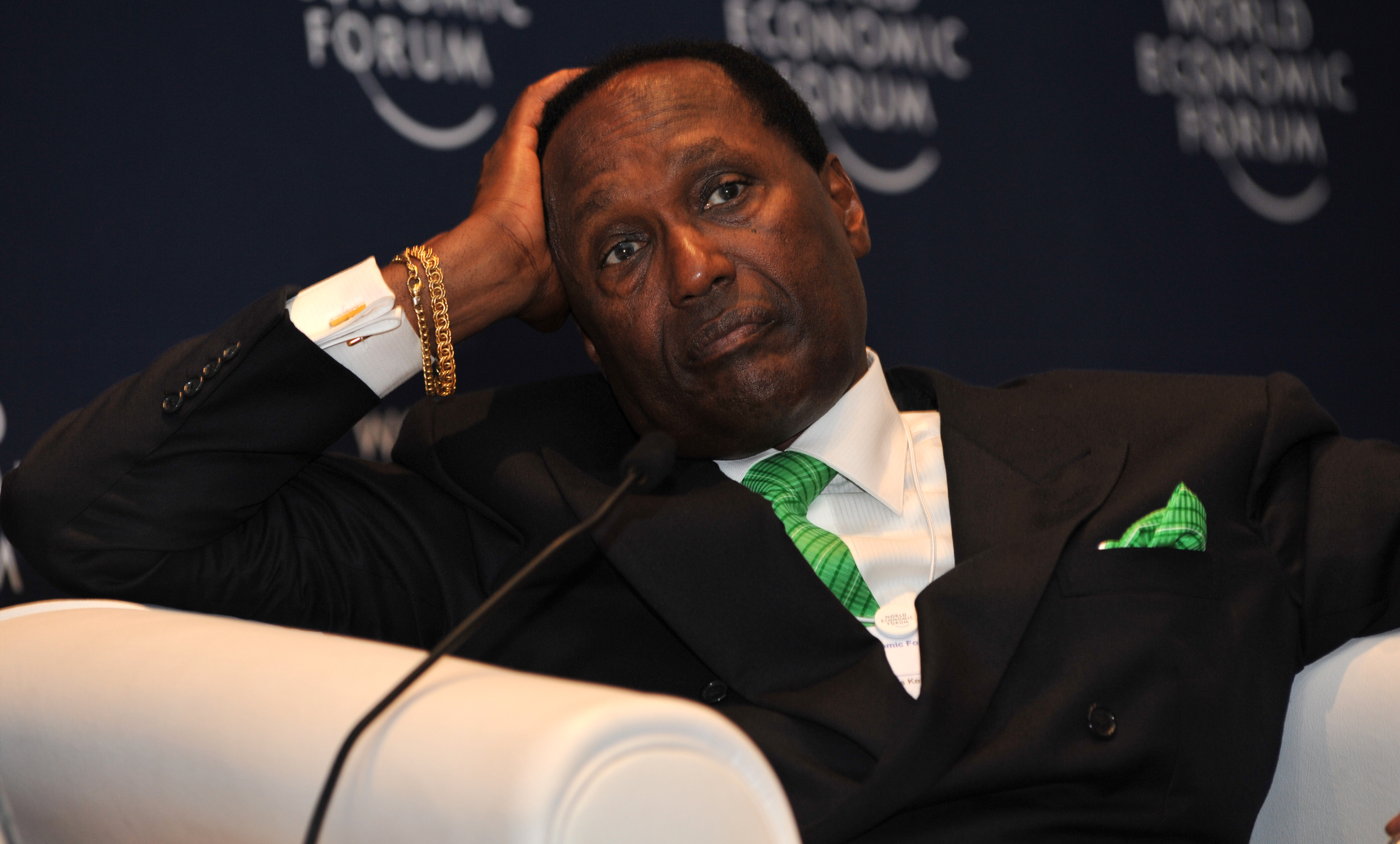
- Chris Kirubi in 2009
- Born: Christopher John Kìrubi; 20 August 1941; Murang'a, Kenya
- Died: 14 June 2021 (aged 79); Nairobi
- Citizenship: Kenyan
- Education: Friends School Kamusinga
- Alma mater: INSEAD; Handel's University, Sweden; Harvard Business School
- Occupations: Businessman; industrialist; entrepreneur; investor
- Years active: 1971–2021
- Title: Former director, Centum Investment Company
- Spouse: Fiona Kirubi (m. 1965; div. 1991)
- Children: 3, including Mary-Ann

Christopher John Kìrubi (20 August 1941 – 14 June 2021), born in Murang'a County, was a Kenyan businessman, entrepreneur, and industrialist. He was a director at Centum Investment Company, a business conglomerate, of which he was the largest individual shareholder.

According to the 2011 Forbes annual rankings of Africa's richest people in Kenya, Kìrubi was ranked the second richest man in Kenya and 31st richest in Africa, with a net worth of $301 million. He ranked behind only the Kenyatta family, who were ranked richest in Kenya in 2011 with a net worth of $500 million. However, in 2012, Forbes dropped Kìrubi from the list of Africa's 40 richest.

He chaired DHL Express Kenya Limited, Haco Industries Kenya Limited, Kiruna International Limited, International House Limited, Nairobi Bottlers Limited, Sandvik East Africa Limited and 98.4 Capital FM. He was also a non-executive director of Bayer East Africa Limited, UAP Provincial Insurance Company Limited and Beverage Services of Kenya Limited.

He died on 14 June 2021 after a long battle with cancer.

== Early life and education ==
Kìrubi was born into a poor family, and his parents died when he was young. He began work while still in school, working during school holidays to support himself and his siblings. Upon graduation, his first job was as a salesman, repairing and selling gas cylinders for Shell, the petroleum conglomerate.

== Career ==
During the 1960s and early 1970s, Kirubi worked as an Administrator at Kenatco, a government-owned transportation company. Around 1971, he began buying run-down buildings in the cities of Nairobi and Mombasa, renovating them for resale or renting them out. He also began acquiring prime land in and around Nairobi and proceeded to erect rental and other commercial properties, using loans from Kenyan financial institutions.

=== Holdings ===
Kìrubi was the largest single investor in Centum Investment Company, whose stock is listed on both the Nairobi Stock Exchange and on the Uganda Securities Exchange. He owned 100 percent of Haco Industries Limited, a Kenyan household goods manufacturer. He owned 100 percent of 98.4 Capital FM, a Nairobi radio station. He also invested in the Kenya Commercial Bank Group and Nation Media Group.

In March 2020, he filed an application seeking regulatory approval to acquire another 20 percent of Centum's shareholding, to add to the 30 percent that he already owned at that time. The deal involved the purchase of 133 million shares valued at KSh2.7 billion (US$25.7 million).

=== Former investments ===
At one time, Kìrubi owned 9.58 percent of UAP Holdings, an investment and insurance conglomerate that provides investment and insurance services in the countries of Eastern and Central Africa. In 2015, he sold his shares to Old Mutual and exited the stock.

In May 2020, Haco Industries sold the BIC brand (stationery, lighters and shavers) to French conglomerate Société BIC. The deal brought to an end 40 years of Haco's BIC franchise.

== Personal life ==
Kirubi was in a marriage that ended in divorce in 1999 and never re-married. He had 2 children, Mary Ann-Musangi and Robert Kirubi.At one point in time, he likened marriage to enslavement as an advice to young men. While speaking in the comedy program Churchill Show, Kirubi mentioned that one should only marry after finding the right partner, else they could end up in some kind of 'jail'.

=== Death ===
Kìrubi died on 14 June 2021 after a long battle with cancer.

== Philanthropy ==
Kìrubi was involved in a youth mentorship programme called Ask Kìrubi. He pursued his passion for youth empowerment in Africa through online authorship and physical talks in high schools and universities in Kenya.

== Awards and honors ==
- 1999: Elder of the Burning Spear (EBS), by President Moi
- 2000: Honorary Consul for Ghana in Kenya(2000 -2008) and member of Ghana's Investor advisory council
- 2012: Honorary Philosophical doctorate in Entrepreneurship by Swiss Management Academy
- 2015: Chevalier,Legion of Honour by French government
- 2015: African CEO of the Year 2015 by Africa CEO Forum
- 2015: Grand Medal of honor by Ghanaian government.
- 2015: Member of Harvard University's global advisory council(2015-2021)
- 2015: Elected Treasurer of the Board of the African Union Foundation
- 2016: Honorary Consul for Mauritius in Kenya.
- 2020: Chief order of the Burning Spear (CBS) by President Uhuru Kenyatta

== See also ==
- List of wealthiest people in Kenya
- Economy of Kenya
