= James Mworia =

Kenyan businessman (born 1978)

- Born: 1978 (age 47–48); Kenya
- Citizenship: Kenya
- Education: University of Nairobi (Bachelor of Laws); Certified Public Accountants of Kenya (Certified Public Accountant); Strathmore University (Chartered Financial Analyst)
- Occupations: Business Executive, Lawyer & Accountant
- Years active: 2001 — present
- Known for: Business Administration
- Title: Managing Director & CEO; Centum Investment Company
- Spouse: Mrs. Mworia

Dr. James Mworia Mwirigi is a Kenyan lawyer, accountant, and business executive. He is the managing director and chief executive officer of Centum Investment Company, the largest publicly traded private capital firm in Eastern Africa. He has served in that capacity since 2008. Mworia was cited as one of the Top 100 most influential Africans by New African magazine in 2017.

== Background and education ==
Mworia was born in 1978. He attended Alliance High School, Strathmore University, and the University of Nairobi. He has a Bachelor of Laws from University of Nairobi. He is also a certified public accountant and a chartered financial analyst. In 2016, Machakos University awarded him an honorary doctorate degree.

== Work history ==
In 2001, Mworia began working as a filing clerk at Centum Investment Company. Despite having a law degree and several other financial and accounting diplomas and certificates, he accepted this entry-level position. He gradually rose through the ranks, and in 2005 he was appointed chief investment officer at Centum Investments. He served in that position until December 2006, when he joined TransCentury Investments as its head of investments.

In 2008, at age 30, he was appointed chief executive officer (CEO) and managing director at Centum. During his first six years as CEO, Centum increased its asset base from KES:6 billion (US$69 million) to approximately KES:30 billion (US$350 million).

== Other responsibilities ==
He serves as the chairman of the board of directors at Sidian Bank. He also serves as a board member at the Nairobi Stock Exchange (NSE), effective June 2015. In June 2018, he is expected to leave the board of the NSE, having served his three-year term, and having declined to offer himself for re-election.

In September 2016, he was named the highest paid executive among the five largest corporations in Kenya, with an annual compensation package valued at KES:201.1 million (approx. US$2 million) annually.

In October 2016, he was appointed Chancellor of Machakos University, a public university in Machakos County, Kenya.

He also sits on the board of Lewa Wildlife Conservancy and Isuzu Motors Limited.

== Personal life ==
According to a 2011 published report, James Mworia is married.

== See also ==
- Nairobi Securities Exchange
- Machakos University
- The Nature Agency Awards
- Two Rivers International Finance and Innovation Centre (TRIFIC)
