= 98.4 Capital FM =

Radio station in Kenya

Coordinates: 01°17′06″S 36°49′22″E

- Nairobi; Kenya
- Frequency: 98.4 MHz

Programming
- Format: Contemporary

Ownership
- Owner: Chris Kirubi

History
- First air date: 1996

Technical information
- Repeaters: 93.0 Western Kenya; 98.5 Nakuru; 98.4 Mombasa; 98.5 Nyeri; 103.9 Meru

Links
- Website: www.capitalfm.co.ke

98.4 Capital FM (other variations of the name include Capital FM and Capital FM Kenya) is a Kenyan urban music radio station.

== Location ==
Its offices are situated in Two Rivers, the largest mall in East Africa, Nairobi; the capital and largest city in Kenya. The coordinates of the radio station are:1°17'06.0"S, 36°49'22.0"E (Latitude:-1.285013; Longitude:36.822767).

== Background ==
Established in 1996, shortly after the liberalisation of Kenyan airwaves, it became the second FM station after 101.9 Metro FM. Since then, several FM stations have emerged, catering to diverse audiences. Despite this, 98.4 Capital FM remains a popular station, especially among the middle-class and upper-class markets. The presenters play a variety of genres i.e.hip hop, RnB, rock, neo soul, new jack swing, world music, jazz, techno and dance music. Capital FM now caters to Mombasa, Western Kenya, as well as the international community through online streaming.

When President Barack Obama visited Kenya in July 2015, he gave an exclusive one-on-one interview on 98.4 Capital FM, one of the only two one-on-one radio interviews that he gave during that visit.

== Ownership ==
It is owned by the estate late Chris Kirubi, a Kenyan businessman.

== Presenters ==
Many of Kenya's biggest radio presenters all began at Capital FM – which has earned it the slogan – the home of nurturing radio talent. These include:

- Phil Matthews – head of The Radio Academy
- Tony Patti - International Radio Consultant - Program Controller - Later Launched Nation FM/TV Nation Media Group
- Sean Cardovillis – now working at Nation Media Group
- Jimmi Gathu – lead breakfast TV presenter at K24
- Caroline Mutoko – Marketing Manager at Kiss FM
- Zain Verjee – Anchor now with CNN
- Jo Thoenes – breakfast presenter in the UK
- Patricia Amira – of the Patricia show at KBC
- Alex Belfield – a radio DJ from the UK
- Fareed Khimani – Director at Nusu-Nusu Productions Limited, Executive Producer of MNET's Mashriki Mix Magazine show
- Seanice Kacungira – a businesswoman in Kampala, Uganda
- Eve D'Souza
- Gaetano Kagwa – Ugandan personality who gained fame due to his participation in the Big Brother Africa competition
- Nini Wacera
- Italia Masiero
- Preety aka Preet Jaswal
- Disk jockey Dr. Vey, Nairobi, Kenya
- Rick Dees, host of the Rick Dees Weekly Top 40 every Saturday
- Walt "Baby" Love, host of Gospel Traxx every Sunday afternoon
- Anne Kiguta - worked as a Senior Anchor and reporter

Fareed Khimani and Seanice Kacungira hosted a morning show from 2006 until 2009, which had a wide audience with high ratings.

- Suleiman Munyua AKA Soulo – Currently a Copy Writer still at Capital FM
- Fareed Khimani is back at Capital FM presenting the morning show with Davina Leonard

== Capital Digital Media (CDM) ==
Capital Digital Media is a section within the Capital FM company that deals with online and digital media presence. This includes digital sales and advertising, web development, video production and social media strategy.
