= Francis Thombe Nyammo =

Kenyan politician (1939–2025)

Francis Thombe Nyammo (28 September 1939 – 28 September 2025) was a Kenyan politician. He belonged to the Party of National Unity and was elected to represent the Tetu Constituency in the National Assembly of Kenya since the 2007 Kenyan parliamentary election. Nyammo was born in 1939, and died on 28 September 2025, on his 86th birthday.
