= Rougaille =

Tomato sauce from Francophone Indian Ocean

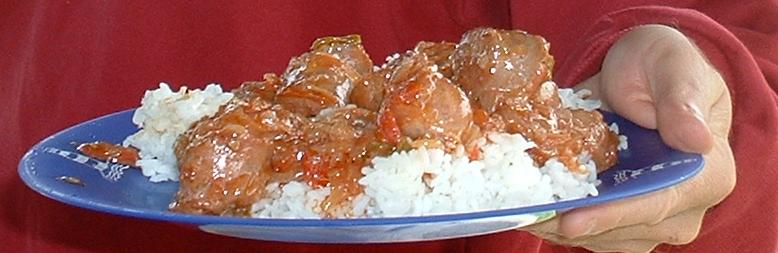
Sausage rougaille

Rougaille, also written as rougail (and sometimes rougay), is a spiced tomato sauce common in the cuisines of Mauritius, Réunion, Seychelles, and other parts of the Francophone Indian Ocean and West Indies. It is a Creole dish, combining ingredients and characteristics from French, Asian and East African food cultures.

The flavour is characterised by the aromatics used, which typically include garlic, ginger, chilli peppers, thyme and other herbs, as well as the base ingredients of tomato and onion.

Rougaille can be served with a variety of ingredients, including fish, prawns or other seafood, meat, chicken, eggs, sausage, tofu or vegetables. It is used in main dishes, snacks and street foods, and as a dipping or table sauce.
