= Sidian Bank =

Kenyan commercial bank

Coordinates: 01°17′26″S 36°47′10″E

- Type: Private
- Industry: Financial services
- Founded: 1984; 42 years ago
- Headquarters: Nairobi, Kenya
- Key people: James Mworia; Chairman; John Okulo (effective 1 May 2026); Managing Director
- Products: Loans, Checking, Savings, Investments, Debit Cards
- Revenue: ▲ Aftertax:KES:287,351,000 (US$2,222,372) (December 2024)
- Total assets: KES:68.1 billion (US$526,685,400) (March 2025)
- Number of employees: 604 (March 2025)
- Parent: Centum Investment
- Website: sidianbank.co.ke

Sidian Bank, formerly known as K-Rep Bank, is a commercial bank in Kenya, licensed by the Central Bank of Kenya, the national banking regulator.

== Location ==
The headquarters of Sidian Bank are located at K-Rep Centre, on Wood Avenue, in Kilimani, a neighborhood in Nairobi, the capital and largest city in Kenya. The coordinates of the bank's headquarters are: 01°17'26.0"S, 36°47'10.0"E (Latitude:-1.290556; Longitude:36.786112).

== Overview ==
The bank is a medium-sized financial services provider, serving the urban and rural poor and small-to-medium business enterprises in Kenya. As of March 2025, the total assets of the bank were valued at KES:68.1 billion (US$526,685,400), with shareholders' equity of KES:7.9 billion (US$61,098,600) and customer deposits of KES:50.2 billion (US$388,246,800). The name Sidian is derived from Obsidian, an extrusive igneous rock.

== History ==
Sidian Bank was founded in 1984 as K-Rep Bank, by Kimanthi Mutua who was then the Managing Director of Kenya Rural Enterprise Program (K-Rep). K-Rep was founded in 1984, by Fred O'Regan under the World Education Inc, with funding from USAID. Its objective then was to develop small-scale businesses in the informal sector. In the beginning, the organization provided grants and technical assistance to non-governmental organizations (NGO). The NGOs then made loans to micro-enterprises. In 1989, K-Rep changed its strategy to lending to NGOs. The technical assistance that had been provided for free now attracted a fee. Kimanthi Mutua, became the Managing Director in 1989 taking over from Dr. Yoder, who succeeded O'Regan in 1997.

In 1999, K-Rep re-organized itself into four entities:

1. K-Rep Group – This is the parent company. It owns, either wholly or partially, the other three subsidiaries.
2. K-Rep Development Agency – This agency carries out research and developmental assistance work for the group
3. K-Rep Advisory Services – This company provides consultancy services for a fee.

In 2015, Centum Investment Company completed its acquisition of a majority stake in the bank. On 4 April 2016, K-Rep Bank re-branded as Sidian Bank, to reflect the majority shareholding by Centum Investments Limited.

== Shareholding ==
As at 16 September 2025, the shareholders in the bank stock included the following:

Sidian BankStock Ownership
Rank	Name of Owner	Percentage Ownership
1	Wizpro Enterprises	24.95
2	Afram Limited	24.36
3	Pioneer Life Investments Limited^{1}	16.89
4	Kenbe Investments	14.63
5	Bakki Holdco Limited^{2}	12.64
6	Telesec Africa Limited	3.47
7	Others	3.06
	Total	100.00

^{1 - K-Rep Group are the entities that founded K-Rep Bank in 1984. The Group sold their entire stake to a group of Kenyan corporate entities led by Pioneer General Insurance, in October 2023.}
^{2 - Bakki Holdco Limited is a Non-Operating Holding Company and a wholly owned subsidiary of Centum Investments. This is in accordance with the CBK Banking Act and Prudential Guidelines.}

In March 2019, the Investment Fund for Developing Countries (IFU), a Danish, self-governing, state-owned investment fund, lent Sidian Bank KSh:1,200,000,000 (approx. US$11.2 million). During the next 36 months, IFU has the option to convert some or all of the principal into share capital in the bank. If all the principal is converted into capital, the Fund will acquire 20 percent shareholding in the bank and gain two seats on the expanded seven-person bank board. Each of the other shareholders will be diluted proportionately.

== Governance ==
The chairman of the seven-person board of directors is James Mworia, one of the non-executive directors. John Okulo (effective 1 May 2026) serves as the managing director.

== Sale to Access Bank Group ==
In June 2022, media reports indicated that Centum Investments had signed binding agreements to sale the 83.4 percent that it owned in Sidian Bank to Access Bank Group of Nigeria, for a consideration of KSh4.3 billion (approx. US$37 million). It is expected that after the deal closes, Sidian Bank will be merged with the current Access Bank Kenya, where Access Bank Group maintains 99.98 percent shareholding. The transaction requires regulatory approval in both Kenya and Nigeria.

In January 2023, the time frame set in the sales agreement between the parties expired before they could reach consensus. The parties decided not to extend the deadline and abandoned the transaction.

== See also ==
- List of banks in Kenya
- Economy of Kenya
