= Grays & Co Ltd =

Grays & Co Ltd (now Terra Brands) is a Mauritian Investment Company founded in 1931, with registered offices at Beau Plan Business Park, Pamplemousses, Mauritius, where its activities are based. The company is a fully owned subsidiary of Terra Mauricia Ltd (Terra ex Harel Freres) founded in 1838.

The company is the leader in the production of spirits derived from sugarcane in Mauritius. Their New Grove rums and extra neutral spirit are manufactured by their sister company, namely Grays Distilling Ltd.while the commercial branch, Grays Inc. Ltd markets and distributes their brands in Mauritius and in export markets.

Additionally Grays Inc is a leading importer and distributor of wines and spirits from the world over into Mauritius and has further diversified into the distribution and marketing of Personal Care, Fragrances, Pharmaceuticals, Home Care and Snacks amongst other consumer goods.

== History ==
The company origins date back to 1931. As part of its diversification strategy, Harel Frères (now Terra) acquired the Mauritius OK Distillery and moved its installations to Solitude, Triolet.

In 1971, the Mauritius OK Bottling was founded to add value to spirits distilled by its sister company. The aim was to better serve the Mauritian market, and distribution was handled by Harel Mallac. In 1978 Harel Mallac and Harel Frères created a 50% JV, Hamarel to focus on the marketing of their brands.

In 1982. Harel Freres bought Harel Mallac's shares in Hamarel creating Grays & Co Ltd, rebranded their portfolio of products and launched new Brands. In 2004 Grays created a 50% joint-venture, Les Chais de l’Isle de France with Quartier Français to produce super premium rums, namely New Grove. In 2006 Grays Ltd opened 26% of its share capital to Distell. This operation gave birth to Grays Inc and a wide portfolio of brands to distribute in Mauritius.

Finally in 2011 with the rebranding of Harel Frères to Terra, Grays & Co Ltd was rebranded to Terra Brands, and Grays Refinery was rebranded Grays Distilling. Grays Inc kept its identity as the commercial branch of Terra.

== Distillery ==
The distillery was created in 1931 when Harel Frères bought the Mauritius OK Distillery. In 1939, with the difficulties of the WW2, the island had problems importing petroleum products and the distillery produced fuel as a substitute. The plant was later renovated to produce rum and other spirits.

In 1980 a brand new distillery was built in Beau Plan and The Mauritius OK Distillery was renamed Grays Refinery. This investment significantly increased quality and volumes. Grays Refinery was one of the three last standing distilleries on Mauritius, with the Société de Distillation de Bois Rouge in Saint André and the Medine Distillery in Bambous.

In 2009 a 50% joint-venture was made with Island Liquid Fertiliser, Evapo, to evaporate vinasse (a distillation residue), creating CMS, Concentrated Molasses Solids, which is a bio fertilizer. In 2011 Evapo was rebranded to TopTerra along when Harel Freres which was rebranded Terra.

== Services ==
The company imports wines and spirits from many countries, and distribute non alcoholic beverages and snack food, and has diversified its activities into Pharmaceuticals and Home Care
