= Industrial and Commercial Development Corporation =

- Type: Parastatal
- Industry: Financial services
- Founded: 1954; 72 years ago
- Headquarters: Nairobi, Kenya
- Key people: Francis Kimemia (Chairman), Kennedy Wanderi (Executive Director)
- Products: Investments, Equity Partnerships, Financial Advisory Services, Management Services, Export/Import Finance
- Revenue: ▲Aftertax:KSh.1.74 billion/= (US$20.3 million) (2010)
- Total assets: KSh.11.9 billion/= (US$138 million) (2010)
- Owner: Government of Kenya
- Website: www.icdc.co.ke

Industrial and Commercial Development Corporation (ICDC) is a Kenyan government-owned development finance institution.

ICDC is a government parastatal, whose primary objective is to facilitate the investment by Kenyans in the economy of the country, while simultaneously providing financing to Kenyan businesses and manufacturers, thus growing the local economy. As of June 2010, the company's total assets were valued at approximately KSh.11.9 billion/= (US$138 million).

== History ==
The company began its operations in 1954 as a 100% wholly owned entity of the Government of Kenya. In 1967, to allow the public to participate in the economy of newly independent Kenya, ICDC spun off an investment subsidiary which it called ICDC Investment Company Limited. In 2007, that subsidiary rebranded as Centum Investment Company Limited. Following gradual, progressive divestments by the Kenyan government, ICDC shareholding in Centum was down to just under 23%, as of March 2013.

== Investment structure ==
ICDC is organized into three main operational divisions namely:

- Equity Investments: Invests in profitable, well run Kenyan businesses, which may or may not be publicly traded. Assumes equity ownership positions in the businesses.
- Loans: Makes business loans to qualifying Kenyan companies without assuming equity positions in the borrowing entities.
- Asset Management and Advisory Services: Serves as Asset Manager and Financial Adviser to qualifying Kenyan businesses.

== Investee companies ==
The following are some of the companies where ICDC has invested:

- AON Minet Insurance Brokers Limited - Risk Management, Insurance
- Centum Investment Company Limited – Investments, Real Estate – 23% shareholding
- KENATCO Taxis Limited – Taxis for hire – 100% shareholding
- Development Bank of Kenya – A development bank, which also offers commercial banking services – 89% shareholding
- Eveready East Africa Limited – Batteries, Skin shavers
- Uchumi Supermarkets Limited – Supermarkets – 3% shareholding
- Funguo Investments Limited – Investments – 100% shareholding
- General Motors East Africa Limited – Automobiles, Trucks, Automotive products
- IDB Capital Limited – Development Finance for Small & Medium Enterprises (SMEs)
- Kenya National Trading Corporation Limited – Promotion of trade amongst Kenyan SMEs
- Kenya Wine Agencies Limited (KWAL) – Procurement, production, packaging and marketing of wine and other beverages
- Kisii Bottlers Limited – Coca-Cola franchise bottler
- Mt. Kenya Bottlers Limited – Coca-Cola franchise bottler
- Rift Valley Bottlers Limited – Coca-Cola franchise bottler
- South Nyanza Sugar Company Limited – Sugar manufacturing
- Agro-Chemical and Food Company Limited (ACFC) – Production of alcohol, spirits and yeast

== Governance ==
Francis Kimemia, one of the non-Executive Directors, serves as the Chairman of the ten-person Board of Directors. The Ag. Executive Director and Ag. Chief Executive Officer, is Kennedy Wanderi.

== See also ==
- Centum Investment Company Limited
- Economy of Kenya
- Development Bank of Kenya
- Uchumi
- Nairobi
