= Centum Investment Company =

East African investment company

Centum Investment Company Plc
- Type: Public Limited Company
- Traded as: KN: CTUM; USE:CENT
- Industry: Investments
- Founded: 1967
- Headquarters: Nairobi, Kenya
- Key people: Donald Kaberuka (Chairman); James Mwirigi Mworia (CEO); Risper Alaro (Group Finance Director)
- Products: Private Equity, Real Estate Development, Agribusiness, Banking, Power Generation, etc
- Revenue: ▲Aftertax: Ksh 812.8 million (US$6,281,318) (March 2025)
- Total assets: KSh 82.35 billion (US$637,334,571) (March 2025)
- Number of employees: 30 (2024)
- Website: www.centum.co.ke

Centum Investment Company Plc, commonly known as Centum is a public East African investment company. It operates as an affiliate of the Kenyan government-owned Industrial and Commercial Development Corporation (ICDC).

== Overview ==
Centum is a publicly owned investment company with headquarters in Nairobi, Kenya. Its shares are listed on the Nairobi Securities Exchange (NSE), where they trade under the symbol CTUM. The company shares are also cross-listed on the Uganda Securities Exchange (USE), where they trade under the symbol "CENT". Centum is an investment channel providing investors access to a portfolio of inaccessible, quality, diversified investments.

Centum's mission is to create real, tangible wealth by providing the channel through which investors access and build extraordinary enterprises in Africa. As of 31 March 2025, Centum's total assets were KSh 82.35 billion (US$637,334,571) with shareholder's equity of KSh45.8 billion (US$354,461,729).

== History ==
ICDC was founded in 1954 as a government parastatal, whose primary objective was to provide a vehicle for Kenyans to invest in the economy of newly independent Kenya by investing in Kenyan companies. In 1967, ICDC formed the subsidiary ICDC Investment Company Limited, whose shares were listed on the NSE.

In 1998, with the Government of Kenya having sold some of its majority shareholding, ICDC Investment Company adopted a new management structure, handing over day-to-day management to an independent professional managerial team, supervised by an independent board of directors elected by the shareholders.

In 2008, the shareholders changed the name of the company to Centum Investment Company Limited. The shares of Centum Investment Company Limited have been publicly traded on the NSE since 1967 and on the USE since 10 February 2011. Over time, Centum's strategy has evolved in line with the company's growth with Centum currently in its 2014 – 2019 strategic period dubbed "Centum 3.0". Under Centum 3.0, the company maintains focus through 4 distinct business lines namely Real Estate, Private Equity, Development and Marketable Securities.

== Investment overview ==
Centum's investments are organised into four key verticals:

=== Growth portfolio ===
This division is involved in real estate development in Kenya and Uganda, with an eye to expanding into other countries in the African Great Lakes region. These include:

- Centum Real Estate – 100 percent shareholding – A real estate management, ownership, and development company. Centum RE has approximately 2,113 units in its project's portfolio spread out across Vipingo (Kilifi, Kenya), Nairobi (Kenya) and Pearl Marina (Uganda) and 89% of these had been sold as of 31 March 2024. During the year ended 31 March 2024, the company recognized revenue from 290 units (FY 2023: 222 units) and booked revenue of Ksh 3.7 Bn (FY 2023: Ksh 1.9 Bn).

Centum Real Estate's portfolio comprises Two Rivers Duplexes, The Loft, Riverbank, Cascadia Apartments, 26 Mzizi Court Apartments and 265 Elmer One Apartments. The company was recently recognized as a super brand and has won global accolades recognizing it as the top fastest growing company to watch in 2024.

- Vipingo Development – 100 percent shareholding – 10,254-acre development off the Kenyan coast.

Vipingo Development offers a diverse range of investment opportunities. These include residential homes, fully serviced residential and industrial plots, as well as enticing prospects in commercial, hospitality and institutional sectors. The development features key urban infrastructure, including a 3 million litre capacity per day sea water desalination plant and an on-site power substation. Vipingo Development's portfolio comprises Awali Estate Phases 1 and 2, 1255 Palm Ridge Phases 1 and 2 and Kingswood Park Vipingo homes.

On 5 December 2024, Vipingo land was granted a permit to operate as a Special Economic Zone

- Pearl Marina – 100 percent shareholding – 389-acre development located in Ntabo Peninsula, popularly known as Garuga, by the shores of Lake Victoria in Uganda. The estate offers residential, recreational, social and retail facilities.

Pearl Marina's portfolio comprises Bellavista Apartments, Mirabella Residences, Springfield Apartments, La Perla Bungalows, Riviera Residence and Kingswood Park.

=== Private equity portfolio ===
==== Centum Capital Partners (CCAP) ====
Centum Capital Partners (CCAP) is a wholly owned, independently managed subsidiary of Centum and a private equity fund manager and currently manages Centum's private equity assets with an additional mandate to manage any new private equity funds and third-party capital alongside Centum's own capital.

This division acquires equity positions in either publicly or non-publicly traded companies, mainly in the African Great Lakes region, but increasingly in other parts of the continent as well. Investments under this segment include the publishing, financial services and utilities businesses. Per its March 2024 annual report, these included:

- Longhorn Publishers – 62 percent shareholding – A publishing company listed on the Nairobi Securities Exchange with subsidiaries in Kenya, Uganda, Tanzania Rwanda, Cameroon and DRC and distribution in Malawi and Zambia.

Products and services by Longhorn Publishers include, Longhorn Publishers, and Longhorn Language Services.

- Greenblade Growers - 100 percent shareholding - This business is involved in the production and export to Europe and the US of premium herbs such as fine beans chives, basil, mint, taragon, rosemary, chervil and thyme.
- Tribus Security Group - 80 percent shareholding - An internationally accredited company and is the security arm of the Centum Investment Group. Tribus operates businesses along 4 main verticals: Facility Management, Cybersecurity and Technical, Training and Manufacturing.
- Tier Data - 100 percent shareholding - An IT firm that provides outsourced IT services, ICT infrastructure and software solutions for medium-sized businesses.

==== Others ====
- Isuzu East Africa - A motor vehicle retailer in Kenya and the local subsidiary of American-based General Motors.
- NAS Servair – An on-site airport catering facility supplying over 30 International airlines that fly into and out of the Jomo Kenyatta International Airport in Nairobi and Moi International Airport in Mombasa.
- Sidian Bank – 12.64 percent shareholding – A commercial bank in Kenya, licensed by the Central Bank of Kenya, the national banking regulator.

=== Marketable securities portfolio ===
The Marketable Securities Portfolio comprises investments in securities and fixed income instruments managed by Nabo Capital. Nabo Capital Limited (Nabo) is entrusted by Centum Investment Company PLC (Centum) with a dual mandate of capital preservation and delivering asymmetric risk adjusted returns on its Marketable Securities Portfolio (MSP) while maintaining operational liquidity. According to the FY24 Performance Review, The portfolio generated solid mean returns of 13.0 percent despite significant macroeconomic challenges. The portfolio outperformed the local Kenyan index (NSE), the Pan-African index (MSCI) and the Bloomberg Africa Bond Index by 5.0 percent, 19.9 percent and 23.5 percent, respectively Nabo Capital was named Best Asset Manager Africa 2025 by the Global Business & Finance Magazine

=== Development portfolio ===
This represents investments that are still under development. As of March 2024 the development portfolio consists of

- Two Rivers International Finance and Innovation Centre (TRIFIC) - 80.5 percent shareholding - The only services-focused Special Economic Zone (SEZ) in Kenya, offering new and exciting prospects for global, regional and Kenyan service-oriented business enterprises seeking a competitive and advantageous base to access international markets. TRIFIC spans over 64 acres within Nairobi's prestigious diplomatic blue zone a further robust development capacity of 1.2 million square meters. TRIFIC is a member of the prestigious World Alliance of International Financial Centers
- Akiira Geothermal Limited – 70 percent shareholding – The first private sector greenfield geothermal development in Sub-Saharan Africa. Akiira is Centum Investment's investment vehicle in the energy sector that is looking to set up an initial 140MW geothermal powerplant, within the Greater Olkaria Geothermal Area. Akiira has access to a concession area covering up to 480 sqkm and has completed the exploration stage of project development.
- Jafari Credit - 100 percent shareholding - A non-deposit taking microfinance company that offers long term credit to civil servants employed by both the National and County Governments. Currently, the company has 24 branches and since inception in Q3’2021 to end of FY24, the company had disbursed Ksh 466 million in loans.

=== Former investments ===
- In 2014, Centum exited two investment funds Helios and Nigeria-based African Capital Alliance where total investments were valued at KShs 500 million.
- Rift Valley Railways – 10 percent shareholding previously held – A consortium that was established in 2005 to manage the Uganda Railway parastatal railways of Kenya and Uganda. This investment was exited in 2012 to Qalaa Holdings.
- UAP Holdings – 14 percent shareholding previously held – An investment, retirement, and insurance services group that operates mainly in East Africa. Centum exited this investment in 2015 through a direct sale to Old Mutual.
- Kenya Wine Agencies Limited – 26 percent shareholding previously held – A leading manufacturer, distributor, and importer of wines and spirits in East Africa. This investment exited this investment in 2017 through a direct sale to Distell.
- Carbacid Investments – 22 percent shareholding previously held – A manufacturer and marketer of carbon dioxide gas for industrial and medical use as well as dry ice. This investment ended in 2011.
- GenAfrica Asset Managers – 73.4 percent shareholding – The second largest fund manager in Kenya. This investment was exited in 2018.
- Aon Insurance Brokers – 22 percent shareholding – An insurance brokerage and consulting services company and the Kenyan subsidiary of Aon Plc.This investment was exited in 2016.
- Platcorp Holdings – Owner of Platinum Credit. 45 percent shareholding. A short term financing company with subsidiaries in Kenya, Uganda, and Tanzania. This investment was exited in 2018.
- Almasi Beverages Limited – 53.8 percent shareholding – The second largest Coca-Cola bottling franchise in Kenya.
- Nairobi Bottlers – 27.6 percent shareholding – The largest of the Coca-Cola franchises in Kenya.
- King Beverage Limited – 100 percent shareholding – Sole distributor for Danish beer manufacturer Carlsberg brands and select Edrington Products and Grays spirits in Kenya.

== See also ==
- Kenya Wine Agencies Limited
- Uganda Securities Exchange
- K-Rep Bank
- UAP Holdings
- Longhorn Kenya Limited
- Carbacid Investments
- Rift Valley Railways Consortium
