= Nancy Njau =

Kenyan accountant and corporate executive

Nancy Njaū
- Born: Kenya
- Education: Kenyatta University; Jomo Kenyatta University of Agriculture and Technology; Institute of Certified Public Accountants of Kenya; Strathmore University
- Occupations: Accountant and bank executive
- Years active: 2002 - present

Nancy Njaū is an accountant and corporate executive in Kenya. She is the managing director and chief executive officer (CEO) of Family Bank, a financial service provider in the country, effective 1 January 2024. She replaced Rebecca Mbithi, who resigned after serving as MD/CEO for the five years 2019 - 2024.

== Background and education ==
She was born in Kenya and is a Kenyan national. After attending local primary and secondary schools, she was admitted to the Kenyatta University, where she graduated with a Bachelor of Commerce degree, majoring in accounting. She went on to obtain a Higher Diploma in Human Resource Management from the same university. She also holds a Master of Business Administration from Jomo Kenyatta University of Agriculture and Technology. In addition, she is a Certified Public Accountant recognized by the Institute of Certified Public Accountants of Kenya. She is also a Certified Executive Leadership Coach. She has attended the Advanced Management Course at Strathmore University in Nairobi, Kenya.

== Career ==
She joined Family Bank 2002 as a graduate clerk. Over the years she served in various banking roles, including as Branch Manager, Regional Manager, Head of Retail Banking, Chief Officer Public Sector, and Acting Chief Commercial Officer, her last assigned role before promotion to CEO. She replaced Rebecca Mbithi, who led the bank for the previous five consecutive years. The position requires regulatory approval from the Central Bank of Kenya (CBK).

One of her first major tasks as CEO is the establishment of a "non-operating holding company that will hold shares in Family Bank Kenya and other non-banking subsidiaries". After the formation of a group structure, approved by shareholders in June 2024, Family Bank plans expansion into East, Central and West Africa.

== Other considerations ==
After confirmation Njaū joined a handful of female CEOs in Kenya's commercial banking sector. The other four are Nasim Devji, at Diamond Trust Bank, Betty Korir at Credit Bank, Anne Karanja, at Kenya Post Office Savings Bank and Joyce Ann Wainaina, at Citibank Kenya.

== See also ==
- List of banks in Kenya
- Economy of Kenya
