= Rebecca Mbithi =

Kenyan lawyer and banker

- Born: Kenya
- Citizenship: Kenya
- Education: University of Nairobi (Bachelor of Laws); Kenya School of Law (Advocate Training Program); United States International University Africa (Master of Business Administration); Institute of Certified Public Accountants of Kenya (Certified Public Accountant)
- Occupations: Lawyer, Accountant & Current Bank Executive
- Years active: 1998 - present
- Title: Current managing director & chief executive officer of Ecobank Kenya

Rebecca Mbithi, is a lawyer, accountant and corporate executive in Kenya.She is the managing director and chief executive officer (CEO) of Ecobank Kenya, since 9 February 2026. She is the immediate past CEO of Family Bank, a financial service provider with assets valued at about US$789 million (KSh120 billion), as of 30 September 2023. She was appointed to that position in February 2019. and she resigned in December 2023.

== Background and education ==
She was born in Kenya. After attending local primary and secondary schools, she was admitted to the University of Nairobi, Kenya's oldest public university, where she graduated with a Bachelor of Laws degree. She went on to enroll in the Advocate Training Program at the Kenya School of Law. Following the successful completion of that training, she was admitted to the Kenyan Bar.

Her second degree is a Master of Business Administration in Strategic Management, awarded by the United States International University Africa, in Nairobi, Kenya's capital city. She is also a Certified Public Accountant, and a Certified Public Secretary.

== Career ==
Before she joined Family Bank, Mbithi worked at Kenya Tea Development Agencies (KTDA) and at Rift Valley Railways. At the time she was appointed CEO, she was the Company Secretary and Director of Legal Services at Family Bank, a position she had held since 2015. Her appointment as Managing Director of Family Bank is subject to approval by the Central Bank of Kenya, the county's central bank and national banking regulator. She replaces David Thuku, who resigned from the bank in September 2018, to pursue personal interests. He stayed on at the bank while a replacement was being recruited. In October 2019, the Central Bank of Kenya approved the appointment of Rebecca Mbithi as the chief executive of Family Bank.

After five years as CEO at Family Bank, she resigned and left the bank to pursue other opportunities. She was replaced by Nancy Njau, the former Acting Chief Commercial Officer at the same bank. On 9 February 2026, the board of directors of Ecobank Kenya appointed CEO and managing director, effective that day.

== Other considerations ==
Rebecca Mbithi is an Advocate of the High Court of Kenya and a member of the Law Society of Kenya. She is also a member of the Institute of Certified Public Accountants of Kenya and a Certified Public Secretary. Rebecca Mbithi is the fifth female CEO in Kenya's commercial banking sector. The other four are (a) Nasim Devji, at Diamond Trust Bank (b) Betty Korir at Credit Bank (c) Anne Karanja, at Kenya Post Office Savings Bank and (d) Joyce Ann Wainaina, at Citibank Kenya.

== See also ==
- List of banks in Kenya
- Economy of Kenya
