= Justine Nakagiri Ssemwanga =

Ugandan accountant, auditor, and corporate executive

- Born: Uganda
- Citizenship: Uganda
- Education: Makerere University (Bachelor of Business Administration); Amity University, Mumbai (Post Graduate Diploma in Information Technology); Association of Chartered Certified Accountants (Chartered Certified Accountant); Institute of Internal Auditors of Uganda (Certified Internal Auditor)
- Occupations: Accountant & Auditor
- Years active: 2004–present
- Known for: Business expertise
- Title: Former Head of Internal Audit of Umeme Limited

Justine Nakagiri Ssemwanga, (née Justine Nakagiri), is a Ugandan accountant, auditor and corporate executive, who served as the Head of Internal Audit at Umeme Limited, the largest distributor of electric power in Uganda, for the one year ending in June 2018.

== Background and education ==
Justine was born in the Buganda Region of Uganda. After attending local primary and secondary schools, she was admitted to Makerere University, Uganda's oldest and largest public university, where she graduated with a Bachelor of Business Administration. She followed that with a Postgraduate Diploma in Information Technology, obtained from Amity University, Mumbai.

She is a Certified Internal Auditor and, as of April 2018, was pursuing certification as a Chartered Certified Accountant.

== Career ==
Her accounting career goes back over 10 years, circa 2007. She became an internal auditor in 2010. She has previously worked with Uganda Telecom and with AH Consulting Limited. Her employment roles have varied from Internal Audit Manager, to Internal Audit Supervisor, to Financial and Audit Systems Consultant.

== Other considerations ==
Ms. Justine Nakagiri Ssemwanga is the Secretary of the Supervisory Committee of the Umeme Staff SACCO. She concurrently serves as a member on the Training Committee of the Institute of Internal Auditors of Uganda. She served in the past on the Membership Committee of the IIA Uganda.

== See also ==
- Agnes Nalwanga
- Florence Nsubuga
- Florence Mawejje
- Ruth Doreen Mutebe
