= Anne Karanja =

Kenyan banker

- Born: Kenya
- Citizenship: Kenya
- Education: Githunguri Girls High School (High School Diploma); University of Nairobi (Bachelor of Arts in Economics and Sociology) (Master of Business Administration); Institute of Certified Public Accountants of Kenya (Certified Public Accountant Part II)
- Occupations: Businesswoman, Auditor, Corporate Executive
- Years active: 1981–present
- Known for: Leadership Skills,
- Title: Managing Director of Kenya Post Office Savings Bank

Anne Karanja is a Kenyan businesswoman, auditor and corporate executive, who serves as the managing director and chief executive officer of Kenya Post Office Savings Bank, effective 2014.

== Background and education ==
She was born in Kenya. She studied at Githunguri Girls High School, where she graduated with a High School Diploma.

She went on to the University of Nairobi, Kenya's oldest public university, where her first degree was a Bachelor of Arts in Economics and Sociology. Shen then proceeded to pursue postgraduate studies at the same university, graduating with a Master of Business Administration, majoring in Strategic Management.

== Career ==
For the first seven and a half years of her career Ms Karanja worked as an auditor, in the office of the Controller and Auditor General of Kenya. In 1989, she joined Postbank Kenya, as an auditor.

Over the years, she received promotions, holding various positions, including as Senior Manager, Money Transfer Service, as Manager, Internal Audit and as Manager, Administration and Property Management.

In July 2014 Anne Karanja was appointed as CEO of the Kenya Post Office Savings Bank, in an acting capacity initially, to replace Nyambura Koigi, who retired on 30 June 2014 after nine consecutive years at that position.

During her tenure she has focused on the promotion and use of technology in increasing the availability of services to the bank's customers.

== Other considerations ==
As of March 2019, Anne Karanja is one of five female CEOs in Kenya's commercial banking sector. The other four are (a) Nasim Devji, at Diamond Trust Bank (b) Betty Korir at Credit Bank (c) Rebecca Mbithi, at Family Bank and (d) Joyce Ann Wainaina, at Citibank Kenya.

== See also ==
- Adema Sangale
- Racheal Njoroge
