= Joyce Ann Wainaina =

Kenyan banker

- Born: 1967 (age 58–59); Kenya
- Citizenship: Kenya
- Education: Duquesne University (Bachelor of Science in finance); SOAS, University of London (Master of Science in financial economics)
- Occupation: Senior business executive
- Years active: 1990–present
- Known for: Investments
- Title: Founder and Managing Partner Chui Ventures; Former Managing Director Citibank - Regional executive director of Citibank Global Network Banking across 11 countries in Sub Sahara Africa
- Spouse: Wainaina Kenyanjui
- Family: 3 children

Joyce Ann Wainaina, is the Managing Partner of Chui Ventures a Pan-African Seed fund. She was previously a managing director of Citibank where she was Head of Citi's Global Network Banking across Sub Sahara Africa. She is a Kenyan corporate executive, who previously served as the chief executive officer, of Citibank Kenya and East Africa, from 2014 - 2019

== Background and education ==
She was born in Kenya in December 1967, and attended local primary and secondary schools. She was awarded a Bachelor of Science in finance by Duquesne University, in Pennsylvania, United States. She also holds a Master of Science in Financial Economics, from the School of Oriental and African Studies, at the University of London.

== Career ==
Joyce-Ann Wainaina is the Founder and Managing Partner of Chui Ventures a Pan-African Seed fund. She was previously a managing director of Citibank, Sub Sahara Africa, covering 11 countries in South, East, West and Central Africa. She has an extensive career with Citi starting in 1990 and has held senior positions across Africa covering country management, corporate banking, product management, operations and controls. Joyce-Ann was previously the CEO for Citi East Africa for 5 years. Prior to that she was the managing director and Chief Country Officer (CCO) of Citibank Zambia, from 2011 to 2014. She co-designed the Sapphire Leadership Programme a mentoring program for senior talent development in Citi across Emerging Markets in EMEA. She also partnered with the Kenya Bankers Association and the Central Bank of Kenya to establish a mentorship program for Women Leaders in the Banking industry in Kenya. She is a founding Trustee of the JB Wanjui Education Trust focused on providing grants to girls in university in Kenya. .

== Family ==
Ms Joyce Ann Wainaina is a married mother of three children.

== Other responsibilities ==
As of March 2019, Joyce Ann Wainaina was one of the five women who served as CEOs of Kenyan commercial banks. The other four are (a) Nasim Devji, at Diamond Trust Bank (b) Betty Korir at Credit Bank (c) Anne Karanja, at Kenya Post Office Savings Bank and (d) Rebecca Mbithi at Family Bank

== See also ==
- Economy of Kenya
- List of banks in Tanzania
- List of banks in Africa
