= Agnes Nalwanga =

Ugandan businesswoman, management professional and corporate executive

- Born: 1975 (age 50–51); Uganda
- Citizenship: Uganda
- Education: Makerere University (Bachelor of Commerce) (master's degree in Economic Policy and Management); Assam Don Bosco University (Master of Business Administration)
- Occupations: Businesswoman, Management Professional and Corporate Executive
- Years active: 1998–present
- Known for: Management expertise
- Title: Head of Consumer Services at Umeme Limited

Agnes Nalwanga, is a Ugandan businesswoman, management professional and corporate executive, who serves as the Head of Consumer Services at Umeme Limited, the largest electricity distribution company in Uganda. She is a member of the company's Senior Management Team.

== Background and education ==
Nalwanga was born in Uganda, c. 1975. She attended local schools for her primary and secondary education. Her first degree, a Bachelor of Commerce with Marketing as a major, was obtained from Makerere University, Uganda's oldest and largest public university. She followed that with a master's degree in Economic Policy and Management, also from Makerere. Later she obtained a Master of Business Administration from the Assam Don Bosco University, in Assam, India.

== Career ==
Nalwanga has a career spanning over 20 years in management within Uganda's electricity sector, going back to the late 1990s, in the days of the defunct Uganda Electricity Board. Since 2006, she has worked with Umeme in various roles, including as Area Manager, Retail Services Manager and Regional Manager. In her various roles, she condemns the illegal practice of unauthorized sharing of electricity through clandestine wiring, which often leads to electrocutions and fires, especially in urban and suburban slums.

== See also ==
- Florence Nsubuga
- Florence Mawejje
- Marie Solome Nassiwa
- Ruth Doreen Mutebe
