= Betty Korir =

Kenyan lawyer and banker

- Born: Betty Maritim; 23 May 1971 (age 55); Kenya
- Education: Moi University (Bachelor of Education); Kenya Institute of Bankers (Associate of the Chartered Institute of Bankers); University of Nairobi (MBA); Catholic University of Eastern Africa (Bachelor of Laws)
- Occupations: Lawyer, Businesswoman, Banker, Corporate Executive
- Years active: 2013–present
- Known for: Leadership, Legal expertise,

Betty Maritim Korir (née Betty Maritim), (born c. 1971), is a Kenyan lawyer and corporate executive, who serves as the managing director and chief executive officer of Credit Bank, a commercial bank in Kenya, the largest economy in the East African Community.

== Early life and education ==
She was born in Kenya in the 1970s. After attending local primary and secondary schools, she was admitted to Moi University, where she graduated with Bachelor of Education degree in 2001. She then spent the next four-year at the Kenya Institute of Bankers, where she graduated as an Associate of the Chartered Institute of Bankers (ACIB), in 2005.

She went on to pursue a Master of Business Administration degree, from the University of Nairobi, graduating in 2016. She then obtained a Bachelor of Laws degree from the Catholic University of Eastern Africa, where she graduated in 2016. She then obtained qualification as a Chartered Credit Analyst from the Global Academy of Finance and Management, in 2016.

== Career ==
Korir joined Credit Bank in June 2013, as the Head of Credit Risk. She served in that capacity for the next eleven months. She was then promoted to Head of Credit at the same bank, serving in that position for three and half years. In October 2017, she was appointed CEO at Credit bank, serving the first one month in an acting capacity.

While at the helm at Credit Bank, she has placed emphasis on the funding of small and medium enterprises. In 2018, the bank won the Best Commercial Bank Governance Award.

== Other considerations ==
As of March 2019, Betty Korir is one five women who serve as chief executive officers at Kenyan commercial banks. The other for female CEOs are (a) Nasim Devji, at Diamond Trust Bank (b) Rebecca Mbithi at Family Bank (c) Anne Karanja, at Kenya Post Office Savings Bank and (d) Joyce Ann Wainaina, at Citibank Kenya.
