= DTB =

DTB may refer to:

== Companies ==
- Diamond Trust Bank Group of Africa
- Diamond Trust Bank (Uganda)

== Media ==
- DAISY Digital Talking Book, a standard format for publishing e-books hearable and browsable by blind people
- Darker than Black, an anime television series
- Hard copy (also known as a "Dead Tree Book"), a book printed on paper (as opposed to an e-book)

== Music ==
- Donna the Buffalo, an American folk-rock/zydeco band
- The Derek Trucks Band, an American Band
- The Devin Townsend Band, a Canadian musical group

== Other uses ==
- .dtb (device tree blob), in computing, a compiled version of a device tree that is handed to the kernel during the booting process
- Douglas DT, an American bomber variant called DTB
- David Thomas Broughton, an English singer and guitarist
- Crystallizer, a crystallizer variant called Draft Tube and Baffle
- Silangit International Airport (IATA: DTB)
