= Ruth Doreen Mutebe =

Ugandan accountant, businesswoman, and corporate executive

- Born: c. 1976 (age 49–50); Uganda
- Citizenship: Uganda
- Education: Makerere University (Bachelor of Business Administration); Wharton Business School (Master of Science in Information Technology); Institute of Certified Public Accountants of Uganda (Certified Public Accountant); Uganda Technology and Management University (Master of Science in Computing)
- Occupations: Accountant, Businesswoman and Corporate Executive
- Years active: 1999–present
- Known for: Business expertise
- Title: Former Head of Internal Audit of Umeme Limited

Ruth Doreen Mutebe is a Ugandan accountant, businesswoman, and corporate executive, who served as the Head of Internal Audit at Umeme Limited, the largest distributor of electric power in Uganda.

== Background and education ==
She was born in Uganda, circa 1976. She attended Tororo Girls School for her secondary education. Her first degree, a Bachelor of Business Administration, was obtained from Makerere University, Uganda's oldest and largest public university. She followed that with the acquisition of certification as a Certified Public Accountant, from the Institute of Certified Public Accountants of Uganda.

Her first postgraduate degree, a Master of Science in Information Technology, was awarded by the Wharton School of Business, in Philadelphia, Pennsylvania, in the United States. Her second postgraduate degree, a Master of Science in Computing was awarded by the Uganda Technology and Management University, a private university.

== Career ==
In 2003, she was hired as a lecturer at Multitech Business School, based at their teaching center in Soroti, serving in that capacity until December 2005. She contemporaneously worked as a Senior Auditor with Kisaka and Company CPA, a local audit and management consultancy firm. For one year, from February 2006 until April 2007, she served as the Head of Finance at Excel Insurance Company Limited, based at their headquarters in Kampala, Uganda's capital city.

In January 2008, Mutebe was hired as the Head of Internal Audit at Finance Trust Bank, a retail commercial bank, serving in that capacity until July 2016. After working as the Chief Internal Auditor at Barclays Bank of Uganda, for one and half years, she was hired to her present position in July 2018.

== Other considerations ==
Mutebe is the Vice President of the Institute of Internal Auditors Uganda, and concurrently serves as the Vice President of the Institute of Certified Public Accountants of Uganda (ICPAU), the first woman to serve in that role, since ICPAU was founded in 1992.

== See also ==
- Florence Nsubuga
- Florence Mawejje
- Marie Solome Nassiwa
- Anne Muraya
