= Diamond Trust Bank (Kenya) =

Commercial bank in Kenya

Diamond Trust Bank Kenya Limited
- Company type: Subsidiary of Diamond Trust Bank Group: NSE: DTK
- Industry: Financial services
- Founded: 1946; 80 years ago
- Headquarters: DTB Centre, Mombasa Road, Nairobi, Kenya
- Key people: Linus Gitahi; Chairman; Murali Natarajan; CEO
- Products: Loans, savings, checking, investments, debit cards, credit cards, mortgages, electronic funds transfer
- Revenue: ▲After-tax: KSh1,813,709,000/- (approx. US$14,195,886 (2023)
- Total assets: KSh399,615,631,000/- (US$3,128 billion) (2023)
- Website: www.diamondtrust.co.ke

Diamond Trust Bank Kenya Limited (DTBK) is a commercial bank in Kenya, licensed by the Central Bank of Kenya, the central bank and nation banking regulator.

== Overview ==
Diamond Trust Bank Kenya Limited is a large financial services provider in Kenya, with total assets valued at KSh399,615,631,000/- (approx. US$3,127,788,413) as at 31 December 2023. At that time, shareholders' equity was valued at KSh56,692,780,000/- (approx. US$443,733,945).

== History ==
Diamond Trust Bank (Kenya), was founded in 1946. According to the website of the Central Bank of Kenya, the commercial bank was incorporated in its present form on 15 November 1998.

Diamond Trust Bank Group was founded in 1945, as Diamond Jubilee Investment Trust (DJIT) with its head office in Dar es Salaam, Tanzania and branches in Mombasa Kenya and Kampala, Uganda. Subsequently, branches were also opened in Nairobi and Kisumu in Kenya. At the time, DJIT operated as a community-based finance house offering savings and extending credit to members of the Ismaili Community.

In 1965, DJIT was divided into three companies – DJIT Tanzania, DJIT Kenya and DJIT Uganda, with the respective head offices in Dar es Salaam, Nairobi and Kampala. DJIT Kenya changed its name to Diamond Trust of Kenya (DTK) in 1990. Under the name change, the bank extended its facilities from a community-based finance house into a non-bank financial institution, and began offering financial services to the general public.

== Acquisition of Habib Bank Kenya Limited ==
In 2017, DTBK acquired 100 percent the assets and liabilities of the erstwhile Habib Bank Kenya Limited (HBKL), formerly a subsidiary of Habib Bank Limited that is headquartered in Pakistan. Effective 1 August 2017, HBKL ceased banking operations in Kenya.

== Diamond Trust Bank Group ==
DTBK is a member of the Diamond Trust Bank Group, a large financial services provider in East Africa with operations in Burundi, Kenya, Rwanda, Tanzania, and Uganda. In 2024, DTBG underwent re-organisation, with substantive CEOs named for the Ugandan and Kenyan subsidiaries. Nasim Devji, who previously doubled as Group CEO and CEO of the Kenyan subsidiary, reverted exclusively to Group CEO.

== Ownership ==
Diamond Trust Bank Group owns 100 percent the shares of Diamond Trust Bank (Kenya) Limited. The shares of the group are traded on the Nairobi Stock Exchange (NSE), under the symbol DTK.

== See also ==
- Central Bank of Kenya
- List of banks in Kenya
- Aga Khan Fund for Economic Development
