= Mawejje =

Mawejje is a surname. Notable people with the surname include:

- Florence Mawejje, Ugandan businesswoman
- Tony Mawejje (born 1986), Ugandan footballer
