= KCA University =

University in Kenya

- Type: private
- Established: 1989 KCA University (KCAU)
- Vice-Chancellor: Prof. Isaiah Wakindiki
- Location: Nairobi, Kenya; 1°15′11″S 36°51′36″E
- Website: https://www.kcau.ac.ke

KCA University (KCAU) is a private, non-profit institution that was founded in July 1989 as the Kenya College of Accountancy (KCA) by the Institute of Certified Public Accountants of Kenya (ICPAK) to improve the quality of accountancy and financial management training in the country. KCAU is located on Thika Road in Ruaraka, Nairobi, Kenya. The institution also maintains satellite colleges under the School of Professional Programmes in Nairobi CBD Githunguri, Kericho, Eldoret, Kisumu, Amagoro, and Kitengela.

== History ==
Following a study by Chart Foulks Lynch CIPFA in the UK, Kenya College of Accountancy was founded in 1987-88. The study concluded that the Kenyan economy required an additional four hundred qualified accountants yearly. From an initial enrollment of 170 students in 1989, the student population has increased tremendously over the years, and now stands at over 20,000 enrolled annually.

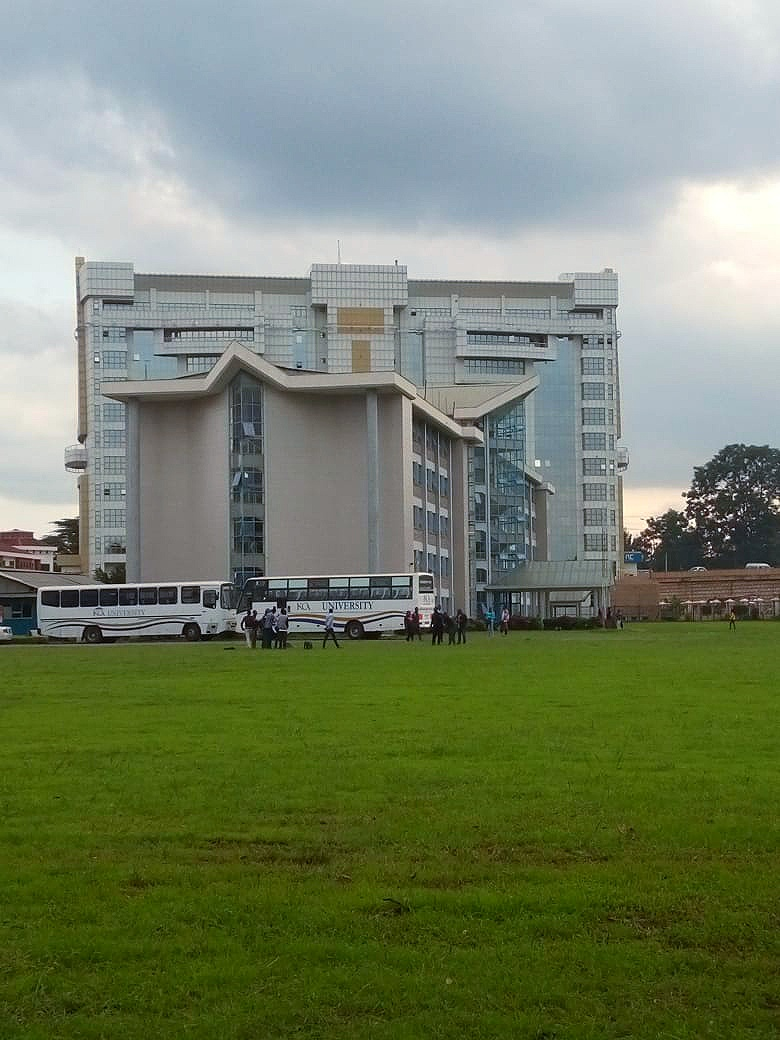
KCA University main campus

KCA applied to the Commission for Higher Education (CHE) for university status in the year 2000, and on July 26, 2007, CHE awarded KCA a Letter of Interim Authority (LIA). Operations then began at the KCA University.

== Faculties and programs ==
=== Schools ===
- School of Business (SoB)
- School of Technology (SoT)
- School of Education Arts and Social Sciences (SEASS)
- KCAU Professional and Technical Training Institute (KCAU PTTI)

=== Degree programs ===
- MBA Corporate Management
- Masters of Science in Data Science
- Masters of Science in Information Systems Management
- Masters of Science in Data Analytics
- Bachelor of Science (Information Security and Forensics)
- Post Graduate Diploma (Corporate Governance)
- Bachelor of Science (Commerce)
- Bachelor of Science (Procurement and logistics management)
- Bachelor of Science (Information Technology)
- Bachelor of Education
- Bachelor of Science (Business Information Technology)
- Bachelor of arts ( Criminology)
- Bachelor of Science (Software Development)
- Bachelor of Science (Applied Computing)
- Bachelor of Science (Data Science)
- Bachelor of Science (Actuarial Science)

=== Diploma programs ===
- Diploma in Information Technology
- Diploma in Business Information Technology
- Diploma in accounting and finance
- Diploma in Business Management
- Diploma in procurement and logistics

=== Certificate programs ===
- Certificate in County Governance
- Certificate in Information Technology
- Certificate in Business Information Technology
- Certificate in Bridging Mathematics
- Certificate in Research Methodology
