= Racheal Njoroge =

Kenyan corporate executive

- Born: Kenya
- Education: University of Dubuque (Undeclared Year); Winona State University (Bachelor of Science in Management Information Systems); Ball State University (Master of Business Administration)
- Occupations: IT Professional; Corporate Executive
- Years active: 2003 – present

Racheal Njoroge is a Kenyan IT professional and corporate executive. She served as managing director of the Southern African region of Cummins, as well as Strategic Programs & Integration Director for the company's Africa and Middle East operations.

== Background and education ==
Racheal Njoroge was born and raised in Kenya and pursued her higher education in the United States. She holds a Bachelor of Science degree in Management Information Systems, from Winona State University, in Winona, Minnesota obtained in 2002. Her degree of Master of Business Administration, with a focus on Entrepreneurship was awarded by the Miller College of Business, at Ball State University, in Muncie, Indiana, in 2006.

== Career ==
For a period of one and one half years, Njoroge worked as an assistant systems administrator for communications at Madison Insurance Kenya Limited, based in Nairobi, Kenya's capital city, until December 2004. She then spent the following eighteen months working as a graduate assistant in the Bureau of Business Research of the University Computing Services of Ball State University, based in Muncie, Indiana, United States, until May 2006.

After graduating with a master's degree in business administration, she was hired by Cummins, in May 2006, first working in their office in Columbus, Indiana, United States, as an IT Intern. After a short stint at the Southern Africa regional office, Njoroge returned to Columbus and worked as a systems analyst for the next three years. She was then promoted to IT Strategy & Planning Leader, working in that capacity until March 2011.

She was then transferred to the Southern African regional office, in April 2011, working in various roles, ranging from IT Team Leader for Africa, New Entity Execution & Facilities Director, to Director Of Operations.

In September 2018, after twelve consecutive years of employment, at Cummins, she was appointed the managing director and CEO of the Southern African regional office, responsible for twelve Sub-Saharan countries.

== See also ==
- Adema Sangale
- Anne Karanja
