= Kenya Tea Development Agency =

Kenyan company in the tea market

Kenya Tea Development Agency Holdings (KTDA) is a Kenyan company that provides comprehensive services to more than 600,000 small tea farmers such as agri-extension, transportation, processing, and marketing.

== Overview ==
The tea industry in Kenya is broken down broadly into policy, production, regulatory & research and trade & promotions. The main players are the Government of Kenya through the Ministry of Agriculture, Tea Board of Kenya, Tea Research Foundation Kenya Tea Development Agency (Holdings) Limited, Kenya Tea Growers Association, Nyayo Tea Zone Development Corporation and East Africa Tea Trade Association. This growth was attributed to favourable weather conditions coupled with improved global demand.

== History ==
=== Colonial era ===
Tea production in Kenya started in 1903 with commercial farming starting in 1924 on colonalist-occupied farms. The 1929/30 world economic recession brought slump in the expanding tea industry as did other sectors of the economy. Due to shrinkage in the export market, the domestic market grew faster than anticipated. Competition for the domestic market was stiff and by 1931 the Kenya Tea Growers Association (KTGA) was formed to promote the interests of all persons concerned in the cultivation of tea in Kenya.

Soon after, the Associated Tea Growers of East Africa (ATGEA) was established to foster the same objectives within the three east African countries of Kenya, Uganda and Tanganyika (now Tanzania). Tea growing and production was expanding elsewhere in the world. India, Ceylon (Now Sri Lanka) and the Dutch East Indies (now Indonesia) were experiencing over-production which culminated in the introduction of international tea growing expansion restriction scheme signed under the first Tea Agreement in Amsterdam in 1933.

By then Kenya had planted only about 4,800 hectares under tea and was subjected to the same expansionary restrictions as the major tea growers in the world. The colonial government prohibited local natives in Kenya to grow cash crops up to 1937 when commercial maize cultivation was liberalized followed by cotton. The colonial government's major arguments were that the local natives of Kenya could not effectively control diseases on their farms and this could be a threat to the “well-cared-for” European colonialist-owned farms. Lack of farm labour was also feared including competition with the Europeans for lucrative farming business.

Before Kenya Tea Development Agency (KTDA) there was Special Crop Development Authority (SCDA). In 1960, the colonial government created SCDA to promote growing of tea by Africans under the auspices of the ministry of Agriculture.

=== Post independence ===
Kenya Tea Development Authority (KTDA) was established under a statutory legislation on 20 January 1964 under Legal Notice No. 42 Section 190 of the Agricultural Act (Cap 318 of the Laws of Kenya). The enactment charged KTDA with the statutory responsibility of promoting and fostering the development of tea for the small-scale tea growers within specifically scheduled tea growing areas.

This legislation empowered KTDA to assist the small-scale tea farmers in expanding their holdings through the following goals and objectives; manage tea extension programme with the aim of improving the level of management and crop husbandry, develop and maintain a tea infilling programme to cover vacancies within farms, increase the area under tea by recruiting more farmers, providing tea-planting materials, collecting, purchase and handling of green tea, processing of the tea leaf, manufacturing of tea, marketing of the made tea, payment of the growers after the necessary deductions and development of sound technical, financial and managerial infrastructure.

=== Post privatization ===
The Agency took over the assets and liabilities of the Authority and also its mandate but under new terms entered into with the independent tea factory companies it manages. In June 2000, the company changed its name to Kenya Tea Development Agency Holdings Limited (KTDA (H) Ltd) in line with the recommendations made by a Government constituted tea industry task force of 2007. It is a public limited liability company owned by 54 corporate shareholders, who are KTDA’s affiliated tea-producing factories. KTDA provides management and other services through its various subsidiary companies under a management agreement with the factory companies.

The Agency is contracted by the tea factory companies to; manage tea cultivation, develop and maintain tea husbandry, collect, weigh, handle and pay farmers for green leaf delivered, manufacture green leaf into tea, market the manufactured tea, develop and provide sound technical, financial and managerial infrastructure, provide services in procurement, ICT, Human Resources and other support services. KTDA (H) Ltd is currently managing 66 tea factories that serve over 560,000 smallholder tea growers cultivating about 130,000 hectares of tea spread in all the 17 counties of Kiambu, Murang’a, Nyeri, Kirinyaga, Embu, Tharaka-Nithi, Meru, Kericho, Bomet, Nakuru, Kisii, Nyamira, Nandi, Kakamega, Vihiga, Trans-Nzoia and Narok. KTDA also manages two factories in Rwanda namely Shagasha and Mulindi.

KTDA (H) Ltd established subsidiary companies for specific roles and responsibilities. The subsidiary companies are; KTDA Management Services Ltd that was established to specifically deal with management of the tea factory companies. Majani Insurance Brokers Ltd undertakes insurance portfolios for internal and external clients. Chai Trading Company Ltd undertakes all matters relating to warehousing, clearing and forwarding and general trading in teas. Kenya Tea Packers Ltd (Ketepa) undertakes tea blending and packing for local and export markets. Recently it has ventured into water bottling (Maisha brand). Green Land Fedha Limited is a micro-finance institution aimed at providing a variety of financial services to tea and non-tea-growing stakeholders. KTDA Power Company was set to develop small hydro power projects across the tea growing regions. During its period of existence, the growing of tea by small-scale sub-sector in Kenya has attained a niche in the global tea trade.

As of July 2020, KTDA is under scrutiny by Agriculture Cabinet Secretary Peter Munya who accused directors of factories under the Kenya Tea Development Agency (KTDA) of attempting to block the implementation of reforms, meant to protect small-scale farmers from exploitation. KTDA's statement as follows: The Kenya Tea Development Agency (Management Services) Limited makes the following statement in light of misleading proclamations that have been made by certain persons regarding the second payment for the Financial Year 2019/2020 – which is due in October 2020:

“The 54 tea factory companies managed by KTDA are yet to close their financial books for the year ending June 30, 2020. In this regard, there has been no communication from the tea factory companies to their farmers regarding the final payment, commonly known as “bonus”. Absence of this, any other pronouncement in this regard is mere speculation. The tea factory companies will communicate to their stakeholders, in their usual manner, at the appropriate time.”

== Management services ==
KTDA Management Services Ltd provides management services to the tea factory companies. The company is contracted by the tea factory companies to; manage tea cultivation, develop and maintain tea husbandry, collect, weigh, handle and pay farmers for green leaf delivered, manufacture green leaf into tea, market the manufactured tea, develop and provide technical, financial and managerial infrastructure, provide services in procurement, ICT, human Resources and other support services.

Currently there are 66 operational tea factories under the KTDA (MS) Ltd management, each managed by a board of directors elected by and from among the growers of the specific factory catchment. These Factory Company Boards are responsible for policies, which govern; contracting management agents, management decisions with respect to procurement of goods and services for their respective factory, recruitment of employees, formulation of annual budgets and monitoring of financial expenditures, leaf collection and payments to farmers and governance and policy making.

== Ownership structure ==
KTDA Holdings limited is owned by small–scale tea farmers. The 600,000 small scale tea farmers are individual’s shareholders in the 54 factory companies, which in turn are corporate shareholders of KTDA Holdings Ltd. KTDA Holdings Ltd is an investment company that owns a number of subsidiaries. These have been set up as part of its business and product diversification strategy. The subsidiaries are:

- KTDA management service (MS) Ltd: manages the 69 processing factories through management agreements with respective 54 factory companies.
- Chai trading company Ltd: core business is warehousing, blending and trading export of tea. It is based in Mombasa.
- Majani insurance brokers Ltd; provides wide range of insurance brokerage services for all types of insurance covers
- Greenland Fedha Ltd: micro finance company that provides affordable credit to farmers
- KTDA POWER COMPANY Ltd: set up to invest in the energy sector and manage small hydro power projects for factory companies.
- Kenya tea packers (KETEPA) Ltd:tea blending, packaging and distribution for local and overseas markets: ketepa has diversified into iced tea and bottled water business with its safari iced tea and ketepa maisha water brands.
- KTDA foundation: a non profit affiliate company that champions the corporate social responsibility activities of the group and leads its corporate social investment projects.
- Chai Logistics Center: Provision of ICD warehousing.

The subsidiaries are investments on behalf of farmers. Dividends declared from profits made by these subsidiaries are paid to tea factories companies through KTDA Holdings Ltd. The factories in turn pay dividends to farmers.

== Products ==
Being Africa's leading tea producer and largest exporter of black CTC (CUT, TEAR AND CURL). Kenyan tea grown in volcanic soils produces some of the best grades of tea, accounting for 25% of total tea exports into the world market. KTDA produces about 60% of Kenya’s tea, guaranteeing and standardizing the quality of tea.

=== Tea leaf grading ===
- Broken Pekoe1(BP1) – this grade forms about 13% – 15% of the total manufacture. It has size particles and it produces liquors that are a bit light in body but with encouraging flavouring characteristics such as briskness.
- Pekoe FanningG1 (PF1) – This grade forms the bulk of the manufacture at about 55% – 60% of the manufacture. PF1 is black and grainy with particles slightly smaller in size than those of the BP1 grade.
- Pekoe Dust (PD) – This grade forms 15% – 20% ppf the manufacture and is often black and finer than the PF1.It produces thick liquors.
- Dust 1 (D1) – This grade is made up of the smallest particles and forms about 6% – 8% of the total production.

=== Secondary grades ===
- Fanning 1(F1) – This is a mixture of traces of black tea and large amount of small cut fibres often sifted out of the primary grades.F1 forms about 1.5% – 2% of the production and is quite useful in tea bags due to its quick brewing, strong flavour and good colour.

28016. Dust (D) –This is made up of tiny of bits of broken leaf and is often used to brew strong tea in tea bags .It comprises about 0.3% – 0.5% of production. 28084. Broken Mixed Fanning (BMF) – This is mainly fibrous matter with a very little trace of black tea.

KTDA has diversified into the production of other types of teas. These are:

1. Black orthodox
2. Green orthodox
3. Green CTC
4. White tea
5. Purple tea

== See also ==
- Ketepa
- Family Bank
- Limuru Tea Company Limited
- Sasini Tea & Coffee
- Buy Kenyan Tea Limited
