= Rose Ogega =

Kenyan accountant and corporate executive

- Born: 1965 (age 60–61); Kenya
- Citizenship: Kenya
- Education: Bachelor of Commerce; Fellow of the Institute of Certified Public Accountants of Kenya
- Alma mater: University of Nairobi; Institute of Certified Public Accountants of Kenya
- Occupations: Accountant; Corporate executive
- Years active: 1985–present
- Known for: Management
- Title: Managing director of Bloom Consultancy Limited

Rose Nyaboke Ogega (née Rose Nyaboke) is a Kenyan accountant, businesswoman and corporate executive, who is the chief executive officer of Bloom Consultancy Limited, a Nairobi-based organization that develops leadership skills through executive mentoring and coaching. She has been a board member of several large public and private companies, including Safaricom, the largest mobile network operator in Kenya.

== Background and education ==
Ogega was born in Kenya circa 1965. She holds a Bachelor of Commerce degree, awarded by the University of Nairobi. She is a fellow of the Institute of Certified Public Accountants of Kenya. She is also a fellow of the Africa Leadership Initiative (East Africa) and a member of the Aspen Global Leadership Network.

== Career ==
Ogega started her career as an accountant at PriceWaterhouse Kenya in 1985. She then worked at DHL International as the finance director for East Africa, based in Nairobi, Kenya's capital city.

In 2009, at age 34, she left DHL and started her own consulting firm, Bloom Consultancy Limited. There, she was an accountant, corporate governance specialist, entrepreneur, management consultant, non-executive director and public official.

In February 2019, Safaricom Plc appointed Ogega as the non-executive director, effective February 12, 2019. She was one of four women on the eleven-person board. On November 29, 2024, Safaricom made a public announcement on social media that Ogega had resigned from the position.

On December 12, 2024, the Standard Bank Group Limited announced her appointment to their board, effective January 2025.

== Other considerations ==
Ogega has been a member of the boards of Barclays Bank of Kenya and UAP Old Mutual Holdings. She has been the chairperson of the advisory board of Women Enterprise Fund (WEF). WEF aims to empower poor women through wealth creation and enable them to have choices and live with dignity. She has also been the chairperson of the Institute of Certified Public Accountants of Kenya (ICPAK).
