= Mūrathi Kairītu =

Prophetess, Seer Mūrathi Kairitu
- Years active: 1947 and 1953
- Era: Anti-colonial activity in Kenya.
- Known for: Predicting a devastating war that would engulf the Agìkūyū people, describing widespread violence, deaths, destruction of homesteads, and dispersal of communities, while offering hope that victory would come through the promises of Ngai.

Mūrathi Kairītu, also known as The Young Prophetess, was a seer and spiritual advisor whose prophecies influenced Agìkūyū community leaders in Kenya between 1947 and 1953. She receive spiritual messages from Ngai (God) and became symbolically linked to Kenya’s anti-colonial resistance period. Her divine messages were associated with inspiring resistance during Kenya’s late-colonial era. She is widely known for predicting a devastating war that would engulf the Agìkūyū people, describing widespread violence, deaths, destruction of homesteads, and dispersal of communities, while offering hope that victory would come through the promises of Ngai (God). Her messages were interpreted as encouragement or prophecy related to the resistance against British colonial rule. She is framed as part of the broader spiritual dimension of the liberation struggle—showing that resistance was not only political but also cultural and spiritual.

== Early life ==
Mūrathi Kairītu, is not widely documented in mainstream history, making her story largely preserved through oral traditions and specific texts. She first appeared before Agìkūyū elders in 1947 during a secret council meeting in the Rironi area of Limuru. Mūrathi Kairītu is portrayed as a young girl with prophetic abilities. Her visions and messages were seen as spiritually significant by her community. She requested permission to address the elders, introducing herself as "Niì ndì o Kairītu kanini" (“I am only a little girl, given courage by Ngai to come and give you his message”). From that meeting onward, she became known as Mūrathi Kairītu, the girl prophetess. Her real name and family background remain unknown. From her initial appearance, she served as the seer and spiritual chaplain of the council, regularly providing messages and detailed guidance on matters of governance, policy, and military strategy for more than five years. She addressed select leaders of squatter communities whose land had been alienated, providing guidance on land recovery and political liberation strategies. The main objective of these leaders was to plan and strategize the process of recovery of their lands and eternal political liberation

=== Role as Prophetess ===
Mūrathi Kairītu did not deliver her prophecies publicly, but to special audiences of Agìkūyū leaders. These were representative of Agìkūyū squatter communities whose land had been alienated and were now living all over the country and some outside its borders. The main objective of these leaders was to plan and strategize the process of recovery of their lands and eternal political liberation. These communities were located across Kenya and in neighboring regions. Over the course of five years, she provided spiritual guidance, political advice, and instructions on military strategy to leaders from areas including Thìmbìgua-Banana, Limuru, Rūngìrì, Githūngūri, Gatūndū, Mūrang'a, Nyeri, Embu, Meru, Ngong, Nakuru, Kisii, and Kilimanjaro- Arusha. Her reputation for prescience and spiritual insight grew as she consistently advised elders on governance, social organization, defense, and strategies for land recovery and political liberation.

=== Major Prophecies and Legacy ===
Mūrathi Kairītu’s most notable prophecy warned of a forthcoming large-scale war that would engulf the Agìkūyū people, involving widespread violence, destruction of homesteads, and displacement of communities across distant regions.Despite the ominous nature of her predictions, she encouraged hope and faith in Ngai, assuring the elders that divine support would ultimately ensure their success. Although she remained largely unknown outside Agìkūyũ circles, her counsel is preserved in oral histories and scholarly documentation. Her life illustrates the significant role of prophetic figures in guiding political and social organization during periods of colonial-era upheaval and land dispossession.
