= Victoria Sabula =

Kenyan lawyer and corporate executive

- Born: c. 1981 (age 44–45); Kenya
- Citizenship: Kenyan
- Education: Moi University; Kenya School of Law; Africa Nazarene University; Kenya Institute of Management
- Occupations: Lawyer, Businesswoman, Corporate Executive
- Years active: 2004 — present
- Title: Chief Executive Officer at Africa Enterprise Challenge Fund

Victoria Chelangat Sabula is a Kenyan businesswoman, lawyer and corporate executive who is the chief executive officer at the Africa Enterprise Challenge Fund (AECF), an "African financial development institution" that provides "catalytic funding to start-ups and emerging private companies in sub-Saharan Africa", in the agricultural and renewable energy arenas. She was appointed to this position in July 2019.

== Background and education ==
Victoria Sabula was born in Kenya circa 1981. She holds a Diploma in Human Resource Management, awarded by the Kenya Institute of Management. Her degree of Bachelor of Laws, was obtained from Moi University, in Eldoret, Kenya. Her Postgraduate Diploma in Law was awarded by the Kenya School of Law. She also holds a Master of Business Administration degree, awarded by Africa Nazarene University, in Ongata Rongai, Kenya. In addition, she is a Certified Public Secretary, and is recognised by the Kenya Accountants and Secretaries National Examination Board.

== Career ==
In 2004, Victoria Sabula began her career, as a legal assistant in the law offices of Rachier and Amollo Advocates, at their offices in Nairobi. One year later, she joined KCB Bank Kenya Limited, in their Nairobi offices, as a legal assistant.

She spent close to nine years at KCB Group, in various roles including as legal manager and head of legal in the credit unit of the group. The last two years were spent in Bujumbura, Burundi, working there as the Company Secretary of KCB Bank Burundi Limited.

She then spent the next five years at Alliance for a Green Revolution in Africa (AGRA), as General Counsel and Corporation Secretary, based at their Nairobi headquarters.

In July 2019, she was appointed as chief executive officer at AECF, where she leads the management of more than US$356 million in investments, as of July 2019.

== Family ==
Victoria Sabula is a married mother.

== See also ==
- Agnes Konde
- Adema Sangale
- Risper Alaro
