= Anne Muraya =

Kenyan accountant and corporate executive

Anne Mūraya
- Born: c. 1970 (age 55–56); Kenya
- Citizenship: Kenyan
- Education: Kenyatta University; Institute of Certified Public Accountants of Kenya
- Occupations: Accountant, businesswoman and corporate executive
- Years active: 1994–present
- Title: CEO of Deloitte East Africa

Anne Mūraya is a Kenyan accountant, businesswoman, and corporate executive who was appointed as the chief executive officer of Deloitte East Africa, effective 1 June 2022. Up until then, she served as the Africa Managing Partner for Responsible Business and Public Policy at Deloitte. She concurrently worked as the audit leader for East Africa. In her new position, Mūraya oversees the company's business in eight countries, namely: Burundi, Ethiopia, Kenya, Rwanda, Somalia, South Sudan, Tanzania and Uganda. She is the first female executive to serve in that position, in the history of the firm.

== Background and education ==
Mūraya is a Kenyan national. She holds a Bachelor of Education (B.Ed.) degree in Mathematics and Chemistry, awarded by Kenyatta University in 1994. She is a certified public accountant and is a member of the Institute of Certified Public Accountants of Kenya (ICPAK), the Institute of Certified Public Accountants of Uganda (ICPAU) and Institute of Certified Public Accountants of Rwanda (ICPAR).

== Career ==
In 1994, Mūraya joined Deloitte as an auditor, in their office in Nairobi, Kenya's capital city. Over the years, she rose through the ranks and was in 2017, appointed the first female "audit leader", in Deloitte's East African region. Later, she was appointed as Managing Partner for Responsible Business and Public Policy for Deloitte's Africa region. There too, she was the first woman to serve in that role.

== Family ==
She is the mother of two adult children, one son and one daughter.

== Other considerations ==
Mūraya is a member of the Deloitte Africa Audit Executive Committee (Exco). EXCO sets the strategic direction of the audit & assurance business for the African region and monitors the execution of that strategy. She is also a member of the Deloitte Global Advisory Council. This group comprises 30 Deloitte partners, selected globally to advise the Deloitte Global chief executive officer.

== See also ==
- Rita Kavashe
- Ruth Doreen Mutebe
