= Lydia Jazmine =

Ugandan actress and recording artist

- Born: Lydia Nabawanuka; 1991 (age 34–35); Mukono, Uganda
- Citizenship: Uganda
- Education: Multitech Business School (Bachelor of Business Administration and Management)
- Occupations: Recording artist, model
- Years active: 2014—present
- Known for: Music

Lydia Nabawanuka (born 1991), better known as Lydia Jazmine, is a Ugandan recording artist.

== Early life and education ==
Jazmine was born in Masaka in 1991. She attended Victoria Nile School for her elementary school. She then transferred to Saint Mary's School Namaliga, in Kimenyedde sub-county, Mukono District. She completed high school at Cityland College Matugga, in Matugga, Wakiso District. In February 2016, she graduated from Multitech Business School in Kampala, Uganda's capital and largest city, with a Bachelor of Business Administration and Management degree.

== Music career ==
Jazmine started singing in her high school's choir. Later she joined the church choir at the Passover Harvest Centre and at Watoto Church. When she graduated from high school, she joined a band called Gertnum, in which she sang background vocals.

Later, the music group Radio and Weasel signed Jazmine to a contract as a back-up singer. She is the back-up vocalist on the songs "Ntunga" and "Breath Away". She later performed background vocal lyrics for Bebe Cool and Sheebah Karungi. Her first single was a duet with Rabadaba called "You Know", released circa 2014.

== Partial discography ==
- You Know
- Nkubanja
- Cherie
- Tukumbe
- Guno Omukwano
- Meu Marido
- Same Way: duet with Geosteady
- Omuntu: duet with Sheebah Karungi
- Control: duet with Spilla
- Silent Night: duet with Kiss Daniel
- Ndaga
- Mwagala Biriyo
- Waiting for Your Love: with Liloca at Coke Studio Africa 2017
- Drum
- You and Me
- Mega
- This must be love
- Kampala kyekyo
- Sing for me
- Binji binji
- Oja kunzita
- Tonkozesa
- Ebintu byange
- Wankolera
- Nkubanja
- Masuuka
- Kapeesa
- I love you bae
- Olindaki
- Omalawo

== Studio albums ==
- The One and Only (2025)

== Other work ==
In 2017, Jazmine was selected to participate in Coke Studio Africa 2017, to represent Uganda for the second consecutive year. She was paired with Mozambican singer Liloca, and assigned to South African music producer Sketchy Bongo. This annual event, sponsored by Coca-Cola, is a non-competitive music show that brings together diverse musicians on the Continent, to work collaboratively with experienced local and intentional musicians and music producers.
