= Ecobank Kenya =

Commercial bank in Kenya

- Company type: Private
- Industry: Financial services
- Founded: 2005
- Headquarters: Fortis Office Park; Muthangari Drive; Nairobi, Kenya
- Key people: Yesse Oenga; Chairman; Rebecca Mbithi; Managing Director
- Products: Loans, Savings, Investments, Debit Cards, Credit Cards, Mortgages
- Revenue: ▼Aftertax:US$-10.3 million (KES:-890 million) (2013)
- Total assets: US$427.6 million (KES:36.9 billion) (2013)
- Parent: Ecobank
- Website: ecobank.com/ke/

Ecobank Kenya is a commercial bank in Kenya. It is one of the commercial banks licensed by the Central Bank of Kenya, the central bank and national banking regulator.

== Overview ==
On 16 June 2008, Ecobank Transnational Incorporated acquired 75% of EABS Bank, which had been licensed in 2005. The bank changed its name to Ecobank Kenya Limited to reflect the new shareholding. Later, it increased its shareholding in the bank, to 95.67% as at 3 July 2013. As of December 2013, Ecobank Kenya had total assets valued at approximately KES:36.9 billion (US$427.6 million), with shareholders' equity of about KES:3.39 billion (US$39.3 million).

== Ecobank network ==
Ecobank Kenya is a member of Ecobank Transnational, the leading independent pan-African bank, headquartered in Lomé, Togo with affiliates in West Africa, Central Africa, East Africa and Southern Africa. Ecobank, which was established in 1985, has grown to a network of over 600 branches, employing over 10,000 people, with offices in 33 countries including Benin, Burkina Faso, Burundi, Cameroon, Cape Verde, Central African Republic, Chad, Republic of Congo, Democratic Republic of Congo, Equatorial Guinea, France, Gabon, Ghana, Guinea, Guinea-Bissau, Ivory Coast, Kenya, Liberia, Malawi, Mali, Niger, Nigeria, Rwanda, Sao Tome, Senegal, Sierra Leone, South Sudan, Tanzania, The Gambia, Togo, Uganda, Zambia and Zimbabwe. Ecobank Transnational also maintains representative offices in Angola, China, Ethiopia, South Africa, and the United Arab Emirates.

== Parent company ==
Ecobank Transnational Inc. is the parent company of the Ecobank Group which includes the following specialized subsidiaries:

- Ecobank Development Corporation (EDC) – Lomé, Togo
- EDC Investment Corporation – Abidjan, Ivory Coast
- EDC Investment Corporation – Douala, Cameroon
- EDC Securities Limited – Lagos, Nigeria
- EDC Stockbrokers Limited – Accra, Ghana
- Ecobank Asset Management – Abidjan, Ivory Coast
- e-Process International SA – Lomé, Togo
- ECV Servicios – Praia, Cape Verde

The stock of Ecobank is traded on the Ghana Stock Exchange (GSE), the Nigerian Stock Exchange (NSE) and the BRVM stock exchange in Abidjan, Ivory Coast.

== Ownership ==
Ecobank Kenya is 100% owned by Ecobank Transnational.

== Governance ==
As of 13 February 2026, the acting chairman of the 10-person board of directors is Yesse Oenga, a businessman and non-executive director. Rebecca Mbithi, serves as the managing director and CEO.

== Branch Network ==
As of July 2017, the bank maintains 21 networked branches in Kenya. In October 2016, Ecobank Kenya notified the public and its customers of its plans to close nine of its twenty-nine branches, to reduce the number to 20, by end of April 2017.

== See also ==
- Ecobank
- Kenya Banks
- Ecobank Ghana
- Ecobank Nigeria
- Ecobank Uganda
- Ecobank Zimbabwe
