= Rita Kavashe =

Kenyan businesswoman and corporate executive

- Born: 1968 (age 57–58); Kenya
- Citizenship: Kenya
- Education: Moi University (Bachelor of Education); University of Nairobi (Master of Business Administration); Harvard Business School (Business Leadership Program)
- Occupation: Business executive
- Years active: 1995–present
- Title: Chief Executive Officer of Isuzu East Africa

Rita Kavashe is a Kenyan businesswoman and corporate executive who is the chief executive officer of Isuzu Motors East Africa Limited, the East African franchise of the Japanese automotive conglomerate, Isuzu. She also sits on the boards of approximately one half a dozen public and private Kenyan companies and businesses.

== Background and education ==
She was born and grew up in Taita–Taveta County, in southeastern Kenya. After attending local elementary and secondary schools, she was admitted to Moi University in 1988, where she graduated with a Bachelor of Education degree. Later, she studied at the University of Nairobi, where she obtained a Master of Business Administration degree, in 2005. She also attended the Business Leadership Program at Harvard Business School, in 2013. In addition, she is an executive coach certified by the Academy of Executive Coaches (AOEC), of the United Kingdom.

== Career ==
Kavashe started out in 1995, soon after university, as a sales representative at General Motors East Africa Limited. She held several key positions in sales and marketing, over the years. She spent six months working in South Africa in 2010, at the company's facilities in that country.

In 2011, she was appointed as managing director of General Motors East Africa Limited. At that time, the company was the largest assembler of automotive vehicles, based in Nairobi, Kenya's capital city. When the majority shareholding in the company was acquired by Isuzu in 2015, Kavashe was retained as managing director. Under her leadership, the assembly line for pick-up trucks was relocated from South Africa to Kenya, resulting in the creation of 150 new jobs.

== Other considerations ==
As of September, in addition to her responsibilities at CEO of Isuzu East Africa Limited, Rita Kavashe concurrently serves in the following roles: 1. Chairperson of Kenya Motor Industry Association 2. Member of the Governing Council of Automobile Association of Kenya 3. Independent non-executive director at Bamburi Cement Company Limited 4. Independent Non-Executive Chairperson of British American Tobacco Kenya Limited.

In addition, she is also: 5. Member of the board of Kenya Vision 2030 6. Chair of the board of Kenya Roads Board and National Transport & Safety Authority and 7. Member-Governing Council at Kenya Association of Manufacturers.

== See also ==
- Transport in Kenya
- Anne Muraya
