= Multitech Business School =

Institution of higher education in Uganda

Coordinates: 00°19′28″N 32°33′54″E

- Type: Private
- Established: 1989
- Chairperson: Aloysius Kyeyune Ssemanda
- Principal: Menya Mohamed
- Students: 1,600+ (2011)
- Location: Kampala, Uganda
- Campus: Urban
- Website: www.multitech.ac.ug

Multitech Business School (MBS) is a privately owned institution of higher education, which offers degree, diploma and certificate courses in multiple business disciplines in Uganda. It is recognized by the Uganda National Council for Higher Education, as a private, tertiary degree-awarding institution of higher learning.

== Location ==
The main campus of MBS is located at the corner of Sir Apollo Kaggwa Road and Kyaddondo Road, in Kampala, the capital and largest city in the country. This is about 4 kilometres (2 mi), by road, northwest of the city center. The geographical coordinates of the school's main campus are: 0°19'28.0"N, 32°33'54.0"E (Latitude: 0.324444; Longitude: 32.565000).

The school maintains two other campuses, one in the town of Hoima, and another campus in Kakiri. As of 2011, MBS also had training centres in ten other Ugandan towns, namely Arua, Gulu, Fort Portal, Hoima, Kabale, Kitgum, Lira, Masaka, Mbale and Soroti.

== History ==
MBS was founded in 1989 to provide training for professional accountants pursuing awards of various professional bodies, including the Institute of Certified Public Accountants of Kenya, the Association of Chartered Certified Accountants and the Chartered Institute of Procurement & Supply. Later, when the Institute of Certified Public Accountants of Uganda (ICPAU) was established, MBS trained accountants for those examinations as well. According to the MBS Principal, approximately 60 percent of Uganda's professional accountants have received some training from the school. In 2013, the school received accreditation to offer certificate and diplomas in certain business disciplines. In 2016, the institution was licensed to offer degrees as well. As of December 2011, the school had a student population in excess of 1,600 in 13 locations across Uganda.

== Academic courses ==
Postgraduate courses

The following postgraduate courses have a training duration of one year.

- Postgraduate Diploma in Business Administration and Management
- Postgraduate Diploma in Public Administration and Management
- Postgraduate Diploma in Procurement and Logistics Management

Undergraduate courses

The following degree courses have a training duration of three years.

- Bachelor in Business Administration and Management, with options in Finance, Accounting, Marketing, Human Resource Management, Procurement & Logistics Management
- Bachelors of Science in Accounting & Finance
- Bachelors of Science in Computer Science
- Bachelors of Business Computing
- Bachelors of Information Technology
- Bachelors of Procurement and Logistics Management
- Bachelor In Mass Communication And Journalism
- Bachelors of Micro Finance Management
- Bachelors of Science in Records Management and Informatics Technology
- Bachelors of Banking and Finance

Diploma courses

The following diploma courses have a training duration of two years.

- Diploma in Business Administration and Management
- Diploma in Public Administration and Management
- Diploma in Procurement and Logistics Management
- Diploma in Accounting & Finance
- Diploma in Computer Science
- Diploma in Business Computing
- Diploma in Information Technology
- Diploma in Human Resource Management
- Diploma in Mass Communication and Journalism
- Diploma in Hotel, Travel and Tourism Management
- Diploma in Secretarial and Office Management
- Diploma in Radio and Television Production
- Diploma in Micro Finance Management
- Diploma in Fashion and Design
- Diploma in Hotel and Restaurant Management
- Diploma in Culinary Arts
- Diploma in Hair Dressing and Beauty Therapy
- Diploma in Early Childhood Education

Certificate courses

The following certificate courses have a training duration of two years.

- Certificate in Business Administration and Management
- Certificate in Secretarial and Office Management

Other courses

Other courses on offer include, (a) Professional ICT Courses (b) Professional accounting courses and (c) Short term courses.

== Prominent alumni ==
- Lydia Jazmine, a Ugandan female recording artist.

== See also ==
- List of business schools in Uganda
- List of universities in Uganda
- Education in Uganda
