= Diana Mulili =

Kenyan businesswoman and corporate executive

- Born: Kenya
- Citizenship: Kenyan
- Education: University of Nairobi; ALU School of Business; The Academy of Executive Coaching; Stanford Graduate School of Business
- Occupations: Businesswoman, executive coach, and corporate executive
- Years active: 2001–present
- Title: Group Chief Partnerships Officer at Embed Financial Group Holdings (EFGH)

Diana Mulili is a Kenyan economist, businesswoman, executive coach and corporate executive. She is currently the Group Chief Partnerships Officer - Global at Embed Financial Group Holdings (EFGH). She is based in Singapore. She took up her current position in March 2026. Before that, she was the Chief Digital Officer (CDO) at Leadway Holdings Limited, a Nigerian financial services holding company with services spanning across Insurance, Pension, Health and Asset Management. Leadway is headquartered in Lagos.. Prior to Leadway, she was the Director, Digital Ecosystem for Africa at Prudential Africa, an insurance and asset management company headquartered in London and Hong Kong.

== Background and education ==
Mulili was born in Kenya c. 1980. She holds a Bachelor of Arts degree in Economics from the University of Nairobi. Her Master's Degree in Business Administration was also awarded by Nairobi University. She obtained an Executive MBA awarded by the ALU Business School, in Kigali, Rwanda. She also holds a Group Coaching Certificate awarded by the Academy of Executive Coaching. In addition, she has attended various leadership and management courses, including at the Stanford Graduate School of Business.

== Career ==
As of March 2026, Mulili's business career spanned over 20 years. She has experience in sales, marketing, business administration and management, human resources management, executive coaching, business research, leadership and consulting, among others. For three years, she worked for Msingi East Africa, a non-profit organisation active in Kenya, Rwanda, Tanzania and Uganda, focusing on creating resilient employment opportunities, particularly for the youth. She served as Msingi's acting chief executive officer for one year, from 2019 until 2020. While working as Business Development and Innovation Director at Msingi, she was instrumental in guiding the development of the Cotton, Textiles & Apparel National Strategy and Action Plan for 2020-2025, in Uganda.

== Family ==
She is the mother of two children; the eldest was born circa 2003 and the youngest circa 2014.

== Other considerations ==
Since September 2020, Mulili has been a member of the Leaders Council at the Amahoro Coalition, an initiative that brings together business leaders in Africa to find solutions to problems that face refugees, focusing on education and living conditions.
