= Jolly Kaguhangire =

Ugandan businesswoman and executive (born 1977)

- Born: 1966 (age 59–60); Uganda
- Citizenship: Ugandan
- Education: Makerere University (Bachelor of Business Administration); Uganda Management Institute (Postgraduate Diploma in Management); Uganda Christian University (Master of Arts in Organisational Leadership and Management)
- Occupations: Businesswoman and Corporate Executive
- Years active: 2008 — present
- Known for: Leadership
- Title: Former executive director and CEO of Uganda Investment Authority

Jolly Kamugira Kaguhangire is a businesswoman and corporate executive in Uganda. From April 2017 to October 2018, she was the executive director and CEO of Uganda Investment Authority (UIA), the government agency that is responsible for promoting, attracting and facilitating investment into Uganda's national economy.

== Background and education ==
She was born in the Western Region of Uganda, circa 1966. She attended local Ugandan schools for her primary and secondary school studies. In 2000, she graduated with a Bachelor of Business Administration (BBA) degree from Makerere University, the oldest and largest public university in Uganda. Later, she obtained a Postgraduate Diploma in Public Administration and Management, from Uganda Management Institute (UMI) in Kampala, the largest city and capital of the country. She also holds a Master of Arts degree in Organisational Leadership and Management, awarded by Uganda Christian University (UCU), in Mukono. In addition, over the first 15 years of the 21st century, she has obtained numerous certificates for courses she has taken locally, regionally and internationally in areas that include upstream petroleum taxation, corporate governance, executive leadership, public service delivery and tax administration.

== Career ==
For a period of nine years, from March 2008 until April 2017 Jolly Kaguhangire worked as an Assistant Commissioner responsible for service management at the Uganda Revenue Authority (URA), the national tax agency. While there, she and the team she led, made strategic and tactical changes, leading to increased tax collection, from US$41 million in 2008 to US$1,683 million in 2015, with registered taxpayers increasing from 17,479 to 836,830 during the same time-frame. At the time she left URA, she supervised a team of people that exceeded 700 in number.

In April 2017, after a two-round, two-months search process, Kaguhangire was hired by the board, as the best candidate for the CEO position, citing her leadership experience as a factor in her hiring. One of the goals that she prioritizes at UIA, is the development of industrial and business parks in major urban centers around the county, including at Arua, Luzira, Masaka, Mbale, Mbarara, Namanve and Soroti. Another priority is to coordinate with the Uganda Export Promotion Board and the Uganda Tourism Board, in production of promotional and marketing material and performing joint exhibitions and tours, thereby reducing costs and sending a consistent and coherent message to potential investors. A third priority is the creation of a one-stop-center (OSC), where an investor can register their business and obtain all requisite permits and licenses to begin operations in the shortest time possible.

== See also ==
- Allen Kagina
- Maggie Kigozi
- Doris Akol
- Agnes Konde
