= Selestino Babungi =

Ugandan corporate executive

- Born: Selestino Babungi; 1977 (age 48–49); Uganda
- Education: Makerere University (Bachelor of Statistics); Association of Chartered Certified Accountants (Fellow of the Association of Chartered Certified Accountants); Certified Public Accountants of Uganda (Certified Public Accountant)
- Occupation: Corporate Executive
- Years active: 1999–present
- Title: Managing Director & CEO; Umeme

Selestino Babungi is an accountant and corporate executive in Uganda, the third-largest economy in the East African Community. He is the managing director and chief executive officer of Umeme, whose shares are traded on both the Uganda Securities Exchange and the Nairobi Stock Exchange, and is the largest independent power distribution company in Uganda. He was appointed in March 2015, and he assumed his current position on 1 April 2015, replacing Charles Chapman, whose term ended.

== Background and education ==
He was born in Uganda circa 1977. He studied at Makerere University, Uganda's oldest and largest public university, graduating with the degree of Bachelor of Statistics, circa 1999. He is a Fellow of the Association of Chartered Certified Accountants of the United Kingdom. He is also a certified public accountant of the Certified Public Accountants of Uganda(CPA).

== Career ==
From 1999 until 2006, he worked with Ernst & Young at its Kampala office. He joined Umeme in 2006 and served as a regional operation manager and then as the credit control manager. In 2012, he was appointed chief finance officer, serving in that role until he was appointed chief executive officer, effective 1 April 2015. He replaced Charles Chapman, who remained on the board as a non-executive director.

== Other responsibilities ==
He is a married father of three children.

== See also ==
- Electricity Regulatory Authority
- Uganda Electricity Generation Company
