= Donna Kusemererwa =

Ugandan pharmacist

- Born: 1970 (age 55–56); Western Region, Uganda
- Citizenship: Uganda
- Education: Makerere University (Bachelor of Pharmacy); Curtin University of Technology (Master of Pharmacy); Eastern and Southern African Management Institute (Master of Business Administration)
- Occupations: Pharmacist and manager
- Years active: 1994 — present
- Known for: Pharmacy & management
- Title: Executive director National Food and Drug Authority

Donna Asiimwe Kusemererwa (born 1970) is a Ugandan pharmacist, educator, and manager. She was executive director of the National Food and Drug Authority in Uganda. She was appointed to that position in January 2016.

== Background and education ==
She was born in the Western Region of Uganda, circa 1970. She attended Kittante Primary School for her elementary education. She studied at Mount Saint Mary's College Namagunga for her O-Level and A-Level studies. She studied pharmacy at Makerere University, Uganda's largest and oldest public university, graduating in 1993 with a Bachelor of Pharmacy degree. She then attended the Curtin University of Technology in Australia, graduating with a Master of Pharmacy degree. Later, she obtained a Master of Business Administration from the Eastern and Southern African Management Institute.

== Career ==
Following her studies in Australia, she returned to Uganda and worked as a lecturer to fourth-year pharmacy undergraduates at Makerere University, from 1997 until 1999. She served as general manager at the Joint Medical Store, a government-owned pharmaceutical warehouse, from 1997 until 2008. From September 2008 until January 2013, she served as the executive director of the Ecumenical Pharmaceutical Network, based in Kampala, Uganda. She then served as a private pharmaceutical and management consultant from 2013 until 2016. In January 2016, she was appointed executive director of the National Food and Drug Authority, replacing Gordon Katende Ssematiko, who was dismissed on corruption charges.

== See also ==
- Uganda Ministry of Health
