= Ketepa =

KETEPA
- Company type: Processing
- Industry: Tea industry
- Founded: 1978
- Founder: KTDA
- Headquarters: Kericho, Kericho County, Kenya
- Area served: Global
- Key people: Tea consumers
- Products: Tea brands
- Owner: smallholder tea farmers of Kenya
- Website: https://ketepa.com/

Ketepa is a brand of tea in Kenya which is a subsidiary of Kenya Tea Development Agency Limited (KTDA) which is the largest small-scale farmer umbrella body in the World with over 650,000 farmers.

The name derives from Kenya Tea Packers. Ketepa is the largest tea company in Kenya, it has been making tea since 1978, but officially registered in 1997, and has its headquarters in Kericho but the law allowing Ketepa to export was only passed in 1992.

One advertising campaign seeks to turn "tea time" into "Ketepa time."

Ketepa won the Superbrands East Africa award in 2007.
