= Leadway =

Nigerian insurance company

Leadway Assurance Company Limited
- Type: Private
- Industry: Insurance; Financial services
- Founded: 1970; 56 years ago
- Founder: Sir Hassan O. Odukale
- Headquarters: Lagos, Nigeria
- Key people: Tunde Hassan-Odukale (Managing Director & CEO); Adetola Adegbayi (Executive Director, General Insurance)
- Products: Insurance, Property Casualty: Commercial & Consumer, Life & Retirement
- Net income: N90.6 billion NGN (2019)
- Total assets: ▲ N394billion NGN (2019)
- Subsidiaries: Leadway Hotel; Leadway Pensure; Leadway Capital & Trusts; Leadway Properties & Investments; Leadway Asset Management
- Website: www.leadway.com

Leadway Assurance Company, also known as Leadway, is a Nigerian insurance corporation headquartered in Lagos, Nigeria. It is one of Nigeria's largest insurance companies. Leadway provides commercial and personal property and casualty insurance, travel insurance and life insurance.

== History ==
Leadway was established in 1970 by Sir Hassan O. Odukale. It commenced business in 1971 and started out as a direct motor insurer. It expanded into other areas of general business until it became a composite company underwriting both life and general insurance business. The company's financial capacity grew over time, and can now underwrite risks of very high magnitude as regards heavy industries, such as Oil and Gas and big manufacturing concerns. It also offers subsidiary financial services like Bond, Secured Credit, Miscellaneous financial losses and Fund/Portfolio management.

The company is now being run by Tunde Hassan-Odukale.
