= Diamond Trust Bank (Tanzania) Limited =

Commercial bank in Tanzania

Diamond Trust Bank Tanzania Plc
- Company type: Private
- Industry: Financial services
- Founded: 1945
- Headquarters: Plot 991, Kahama Road, Masaki Dar es Salaam, Tanzania
- Key people: Karim Wissanji; Chairman; Ravneet Chowdhury; Country Manager & CEO
- Products: Loans, savings, checking, investments, debit cards, credit cards, mortgages, electronic funds transfer
- Revenue: ▲After-tax: TSh 11.95 billion (US$5.19 million) (2021)
- Total assets: TSh 984 billion (US$450.7 million) (2016)
- Number of employees: 567
- Website: www.diamondtrust.co.tz

Diamond Trust Bank Tanzania Plc (DTBT) is a commercial bank in Tanzania, licensed by the Bank of Tanzania.

== Overview ==
Diamond Trust Bank Tanzania PLC is a large financial services provider in Tanzania, with total assets valued at TSh 1,405 billion (approx. US$610 million) as at 31 December 2021. At that time, shareholders' equity was valued at TSh 209 billion (approx. US$99.74 million). The bank has a network of 29 branches, of which 15 are in the Commercial City of Dar es Salaam, while the remaining 14 are spread across major commercial centers in the country.

== History ==
Diamond Trust Bank (Tanzania) Limited (DTB Tanzania) was founded in 1945, as Diamond Jubilee Investment Trust (DJIT) with its head office in Dar es Salaam (Tanzania) and branches in Mombasa (Kenya) and Kampala (Uganda). Subsequently, branches were also opened in Nairobi and Kisumu in Kenya. At the time, DJIT operated as a community-based finance house offering savings and extending credit to members of the Ismaili Community.

In 1965, DJIT was divided into three companies – DJIT Tanzania, DJIT Kenya and DJIT Uganda with the respective head offices in Dar es Salaam, Nairobi and Kampala. DJIT Tanzania changed its name to Diamond Trust of Tanzania (DTT) in 1990. Under the name change, the Bank extended its facilities from a community-based finance house into a non-bank financial institution, and began offering financial services to the general public.

DTT was recapitalized in 1995 through injection of funds by its shareholders. Diamond Trust Bank Kenya and the Aga Khan Fund for Economic Development (AKFED) emerged as its two principal shareholders, holding 33% and 31% shareholding respectively. In 1997, DTT was licensed as a full commercial bank and changed its name to Diamond Trust Bank Tanzania Limited (DTBT). DTBT was declared as a public limited company in 2022 and now known as Diamond Trust Bank Tanzania Public Limited Company (DTBT Plc).

== Diamond Trust Bank Group ==
DTBT is a member of the Diamond Trust Bank Group, a large financial services provider in East Africa with operations in Burundi, Kenya, Rwanda, Tanzania, and Uganda.

== Ownership ==
Diamond Trust Bank Group is the majority shareholder, owning 65 percent of the shares in Diamond Trust Bank (Tanzania) Limited, as at March 2016.

== See also ==
- Bank of Tanzania
- List of banks in Tanzania
- Aga Khan Fund for Economic Development
