= Agnes Konde =

Ugandan businesswoman and corporate executive

- Born: Uganda
- Citizenship: Uganda
- Education: Makerere University (Bachelor of Arts in Social Science); University of Liverpool (Master of Business Administration)
- Occupations: Businesswoman & Corporate Executive
- Years active: 2004 – present
- Known for: Professional competence
- Title: Vice President, Program Innovation & Delivery at Alliance for a Green Revolution in Africa (AGRA)

Agnes Asiimwe Konde, also Aggie Asiimwe Konde, but commonly known as Agnes Konde, is a Ugandan businesswoman, and corporate executive who serves as the Vice President for Program Development & Innovation at Alliance for a Green Revolution in Africa (AGRA), since 2019.

Before that, from 1 October 2017 until November 2019, she was the chief executive officer of Msingi, a private, independent organisation that promotes the creation of profitable industries in the countries of the African Great Lakes, Based in Nairobi, Kenya, Msingi offers services in Kenya, Uganda, Tanzania and Rwanda.

== Background and education ==
Konde was born in Uganda and attended Ugandan schools for her pre-university studies. She graduated from Makerere University, Uganda's largest and oldest university, with a Bachelor of Arts (BA) degree in Social Science. She also holds a Master of Business Administration, obtained from the University of Liverpool, in the United Kingdom. In 2011, she was awarded a Dilploma in Marketing by the Chartered Institute of Marketing.

== Career ==
She has professional experience in services and management in the consumer goods, food and beverages and media sectors of the economy, spanning over 20 years. She has previous worked for several high-profile companies, including (a) Monitor Publications Limited (b) British American Tobacco Uganda Limited and (c) Crown Beverages Limited, the Ugandan licensee of PepsiCo.

Immediately prior to her present position, she was the managing director and CEO of Africa Broadcasting Uganda Limited (ABUL), a subsidiary of Nation Media Group and owner of Nation TV Uganda (NTV Uganda). She led ABUL from 2013 until 8 September 2017, when she left to take up her present assignment.

== Other considerations ==
She is a board member of the African Network for the Care of Children (ANECCA) affected by HIV/AIDS, United Way (Uganda) and Uganda Manufacturers Association (UMA). She is also a member of the Women-in-Media Network, a subsidiary of the Graça Machel Trust. In 2015, Contador Harrison listed her among the "Ten Most Powerful Women In Uganda".

== See also ==
- Victoria Sabula
- Leona Buhenzire
- Diana Mulili
- Aquaculture
- Uganda Investment Authority
