= Marie Solome Nassiwa =

- Born: January 1, 1980 (age 46); Uganda
- Citizenship: Ugandan
- Education: University of Greenwich (Bachelor of Arts in Accounting and Finance); Association of Chartered Certified Accountants (Fellow of the Association of Chartered Certified Accountants); Institute of Certified Public Accountants of Uganda (certified public accountant)
- Occupations: Accountant, corporate executive
- Years active: 2006–present

Marie Solome Nassiwa, also Marie Solome Nassiwa-Martin, is a Ugandan accountant. She is the financial director at Baylor Foundation Uganda, a non-government organisation that focuses on improving pediatric health through monitoring, nutrition, prevention and treatment of childhood diseases in Uganda. Baylor Foundation Uganda is affiliated with Texas Children's Hospital and Baylor College of Medicine.

Before that, she was the chief financial officer of Umeme Limited, the largest electricity distribution company in Uganda, with a customer base exceeding 1,125,000, as of April 2018, and whose stock shares are listed on the Uganda Securities Exchange and cross-listed on the Nairobi Stock Exchange.

== Background and education ==
Nassiwa attended the University of Greenwich in the United Kingdom, where she graduated with a Bachelor of Arts degree in Accounting and Finance. She is a Fellow of the Association of Chartered Certified Accountants in the United Kingdom and a Certified Public Accountant in Uganda.

== Career ==
Following graduation from the University of Greenwich, she worked with British Aerospace Systems Limited. She then transferred to Shell Finance Operations and, later, Morgan Stanley in the United Kingdom. She joined Umeme as finance manager (Accounting), before she was elevated to the position of chief financial officer.

== Other responsibilities ==
Marie Solome Nassiwa Martin served as a director at the Association For Reaching & Instructing Children In Africa, a non-profit organisation, based in Norwich, United Kingdom, from 10 September 2009, until her resignation on 3 December 2012.
