= Umeme =

Ugandan publicly owned electricity distribution company

Coordinates: 00°19′00″N 32°34′46″E

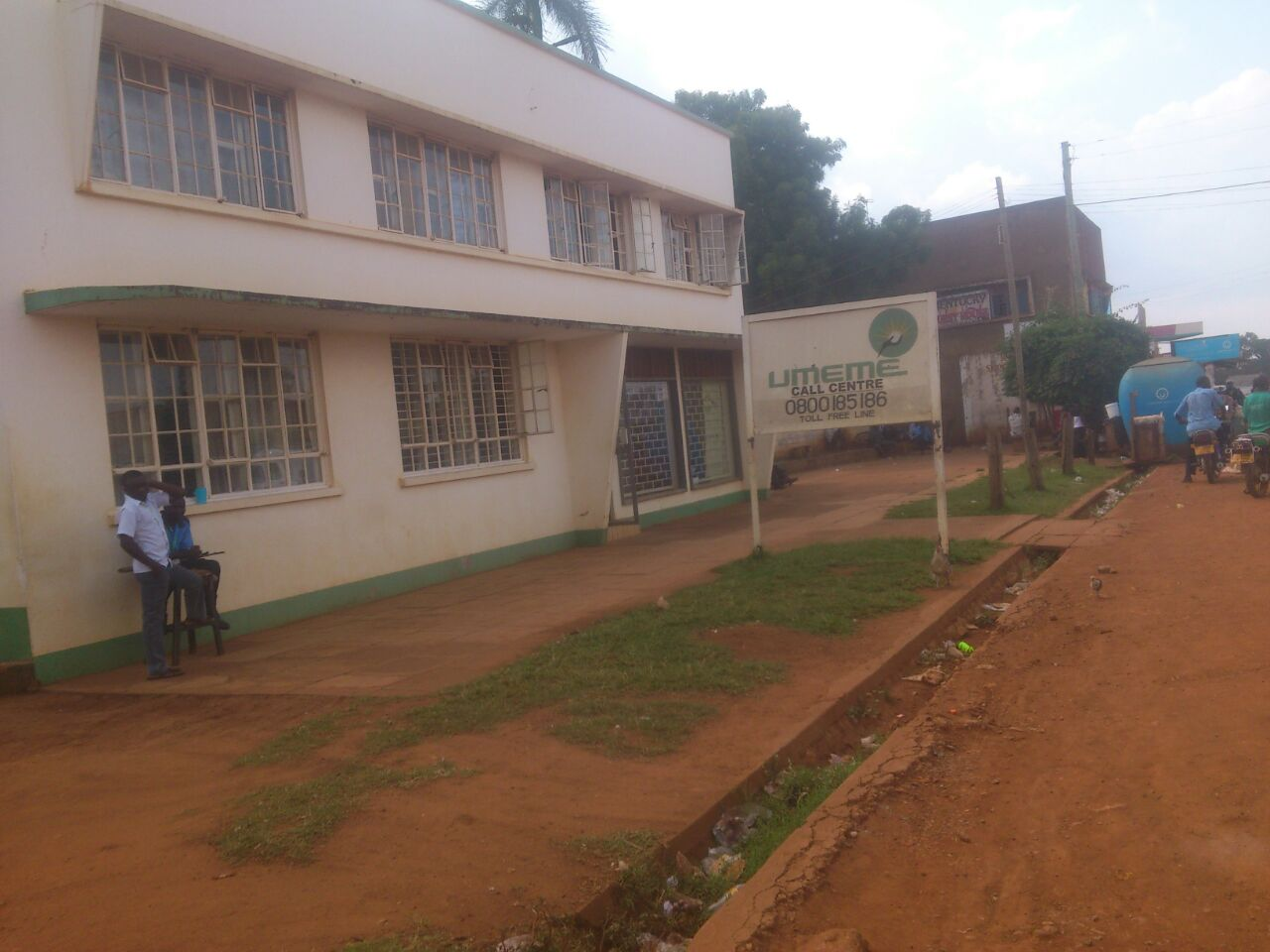
- Electricity bills office
- Type: Public Utility: USE: UMEME
- Industry: Energy industry
- Founded: 2004; 22 years ago
- Headquarters: Rwenzori House; 1 Lumumba Avenue; Kampala, Uganda
- Key people: Patrick Bitature (chairman); Selestino Babungi (CEO)
- Services: Electricity
- Revenue: ▲Aftertax: UGX:11.47 billion (US$3.026 million) (2023)
- Total assets: UGX:2.347 trillion (US$619.18 million) (2023)
- Number of employees: 2,502 (2024)
- Website: Homepage

Umeme Limited was the largest energy distributor in Uganda, distributing about 97 percent of all electricity used in the country. The shares of the stock of the company are listed on the Uganda Securities Exchange (USE) and are cross listed on the Nairobi Stock Exchange (NSE). As of December 2023, the company's total assets were approximately UGX:2.347 trillion (US$619.18 million), with shareholders' equity of approximately UGX:937.381 billion (US$247.27 million).

== Location ==
The registered offices of the company are located at Rwenzori House, 1 Lugogo Avenue, in the central business district of Kampala, the capital and largest city of Uganda.

== Formation ==
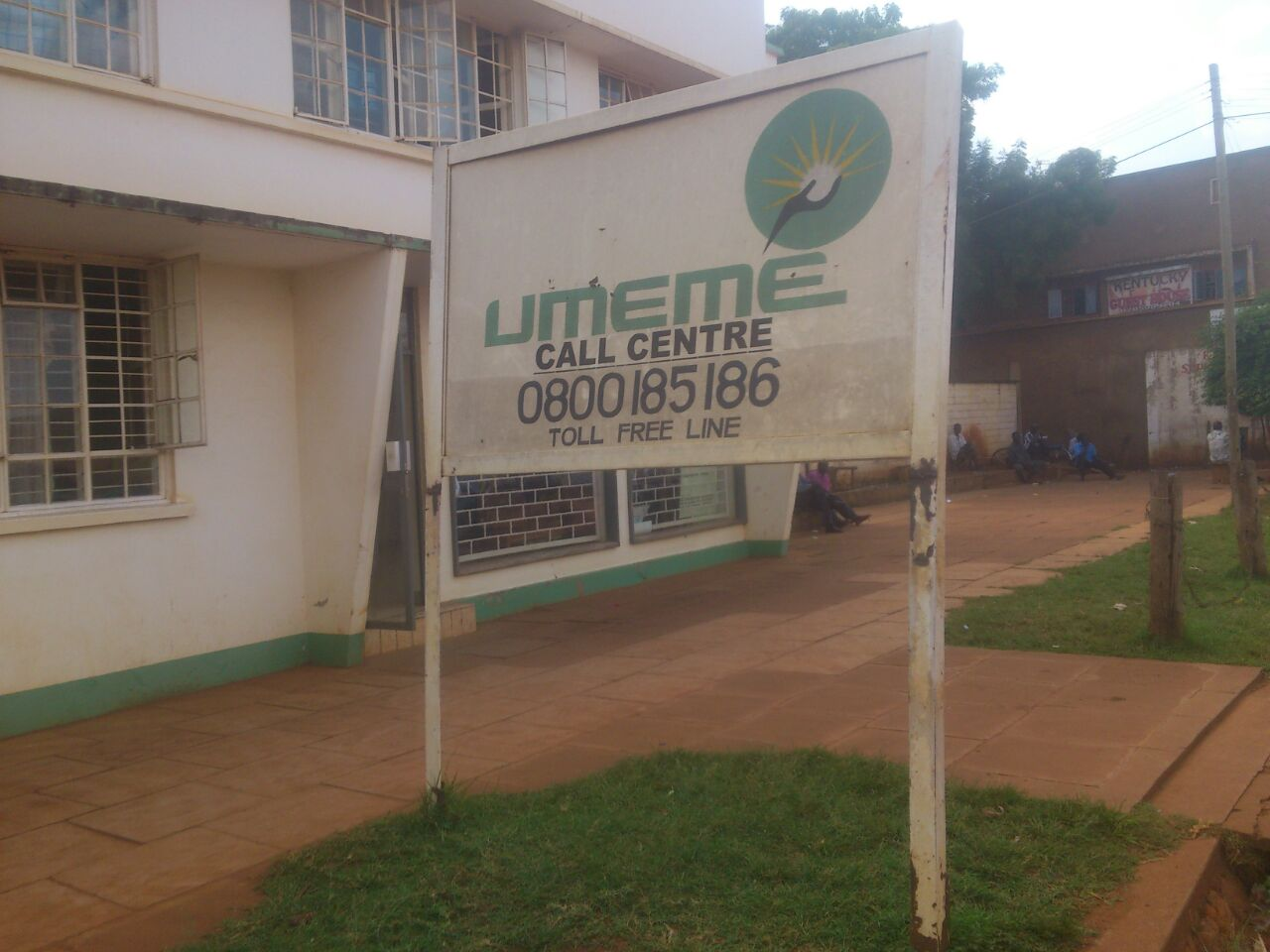
UMEME office

Umeme was formed in 2004 when the government of Uganda leased the Uganda Electricity Distribution Company Limited to a consortium belonging to Globeleq (56 percent), a subsidiary of the Commonwealth Development Corporation of the United Kingdom, and Eskom of South Africa (44 percent). The transfer of assets did not take place until 1 March 2005.

During 2006, the consortium formed by Globeleq and Eskom was restructured, with Globeleq becoming the sole owner of Umeme.

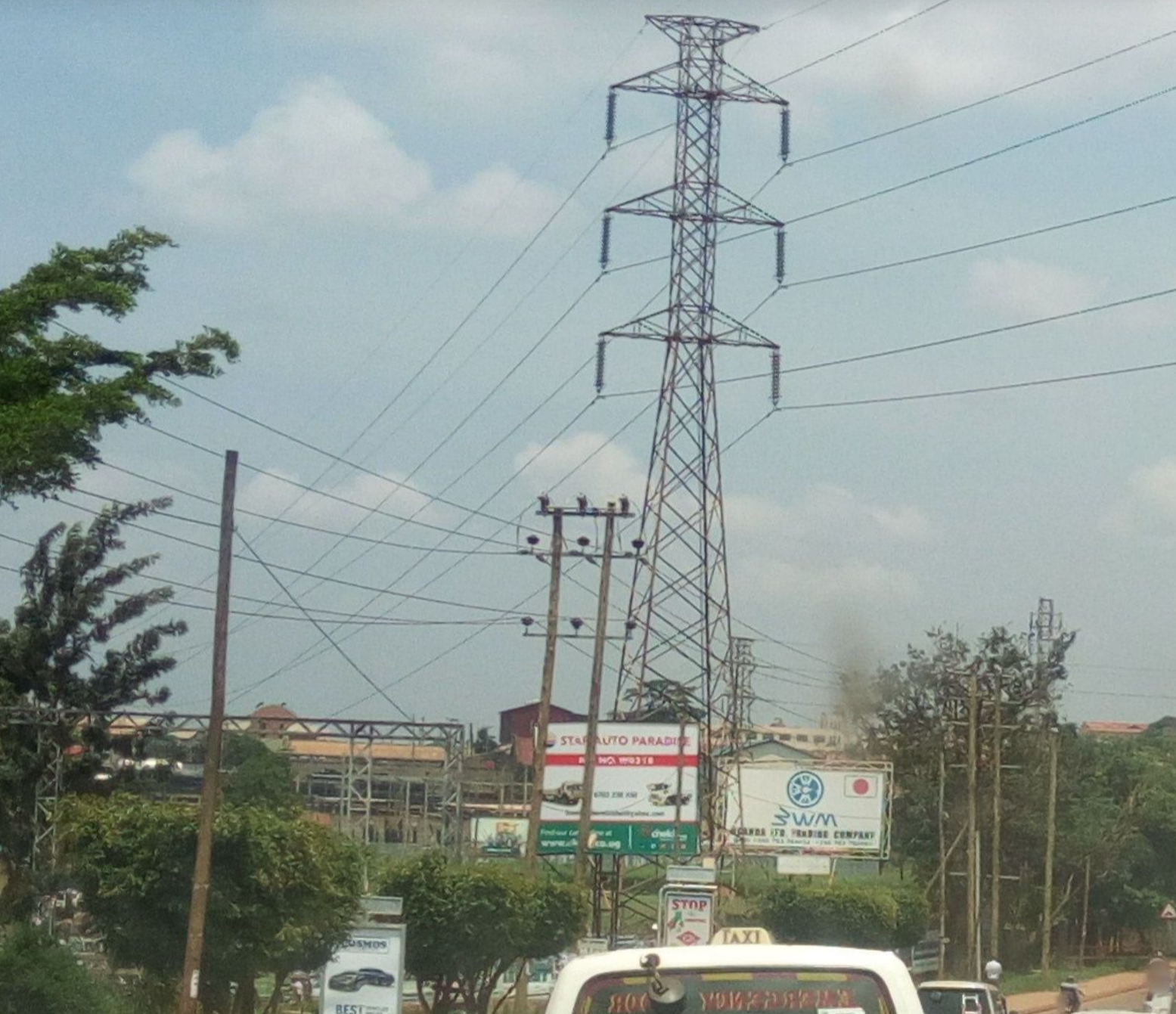
Electricity pylons in Uganda

On 15 October 2012, Umeme became a listed company on the Uganda Securities Exchange (USE). A total of 622,378,000 shares, representing approximately 38 percent of its issued share capital at the time, became listed on the Ugandan bourse in an initial public offering (IPO). The shares of the company started trading on the USE on 30 November 2012. Umeme shares were first cross-listed on the NSE on 14 December 2012, with active trading commencing on 31 July 2013. The company expected to use the proceeds from the IPO, estimated at UGX:171 billion, to expand its power distribution network and payoff debt.

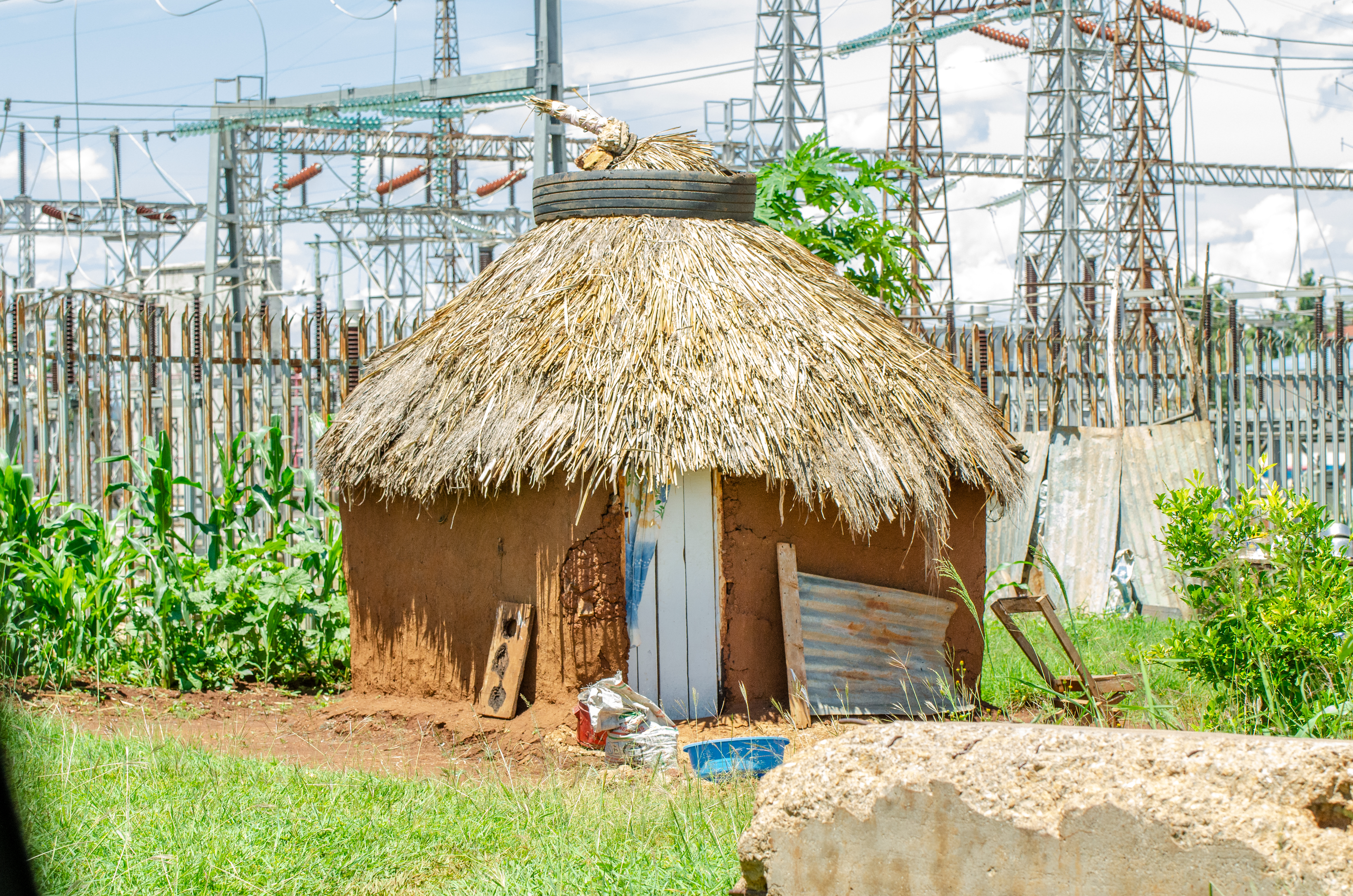
High voltage center

== Ownership ==
As of December 2021, the ten largest shareholders in the stock of the company were as illustrated in the table below: As of December 2017, the company shares were held by institutional investors (72 percent) and retail investors (28 percent).

Umeme stock ownership
Rank	Name of owner	Percentage ownership
1	National Social Security Fund	23.20
2	Allan Gray	14.82
3	Kimberlite Frontier Africa Master Fund	8.90
4	Utilico Emerging Markets	8.37
5	Coronation Global Opportunities Fund	7.03
6	Bnymlb Re	5.28
7	The Africa Emerging Markets Limited	3.90
8	International Finance Corporation	2.78
9	Duet Fund	2.45
10	Investec Asset Management	2.18
11	Conrad Hilton Foundation	1.93
12	Others through USE and NSE	22.92
	Total	100.00

== Governance ==
Umeme is governed by a ten-person board of directors. They were re-elected at the 9th Annual General Meeting held on 6 May 2021, and they include the following people:

Board of Directors of Umeme Limited
Rank	Director	Position	Nationality	Notes
1	Patrick Bitature	Chairman	Ugandan	
2	Selestino Babungi	Managing director	Ugandan	
3	Gerald Ssendaula	Non-executive director	Ugandan	
4	Pieter Adriaan Falling	Non-executive director	South African	
5	Florence Namatta Mawejje	Non-executive director	Ugandan	
6	Andrew Buglass	Non-executive director	British	
7	Anthony Marsh	Non-executive director	British	
8	Stephen Emasu	Non-executive director	Ugandan	
9	Riccardo Ridolfi	Non-executive director	Italian	
10	Florence Nakimbugwe Nsubuga	Executive director/chief operating officer	Ugandan	
Total	10			

== Management structure ==
Umeme is structured into twelve management departments, each headed by a senior manager. The senior managers form the executive committee, whose members were the following as of 1 June 2018:

Umeme senior management structure
Department	Name of manager	Title
Office of the Managing Director	Selestino Babungi	Managing director
Office of Human Resources Management	Fred Mwita Machage	Head of Human Resources
Operations Management	Florence Nsubuga	Chief Operations Officer
Technical Office	Simbiso Chimbima	Chief technical officer
Corporate Development	Blessing Nshaho	Chief corporate and regulatory officer
Information Office	Nelson Bagenda	Chief information officer
Finance	Andrew Oyie	Chief financial officer
Internal Audit	Ruth Doreen Mutebe	Head of Internal Audit
Customer Service	Agnes Nalwanga	Head of Customer Service
Supply Chain	Patrice Namisano	Head of Supply Chain
Comminution and Public Relations	Peter Kaujju	Head of Communications & Public Relations
Capital Projects	Isaac Serwadda	Head of Capital Projects

Under the executive committee, Umeme has 25 other managers who assist the executives to implement company policy and run the company on a daily basis. In March 2015, Selestino Babungi was appointed managing director, replacing Charles Chapman who served in that role from February 2009 until March 2015.

== Unreliability of service ==
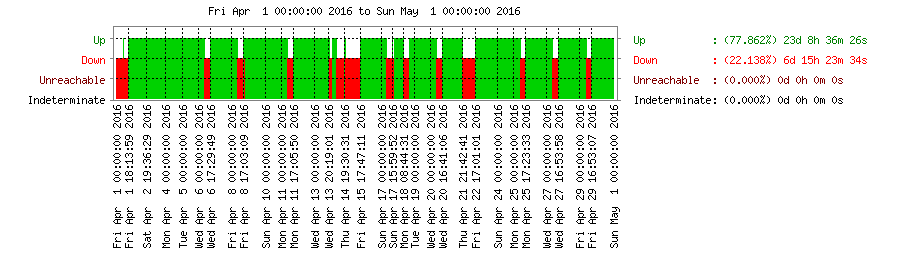
A graph showing frequent power outages in the Kibuli area of Kampala during April 2016

Within Uganda, Umeme is known for chronic unreliability and has been accused of corruption. Customers frequently face extended service outages, which are occasionally followed by protests, riots, and assaults on Umeme employees.

=== Protests and rioting ===
In 2010, protests erupted after a two-week power blackout in the town of Bugembe. Attempts to disperse the protesters led to violent clashes between police and irate residents. Nine were arrested, with eight being charged with inciting violence, staging an unlawful and violent assembly, and insulting the police.

In 2011, a two-month power outage led to protests in Jinja. Residents and business owners built barricades, set tires ablaze, and blocked traffic. Police responded with tear gas and live ammunition. Days later, over 100 people were dispersed by riot police using tear gas and rubber bullets after marching on Umeme's offices in protest of recurring outages in Masaka town.

In 2012, after a month-long outage along the Kampala–Gayaza Road, stone-throwing protesters caused property damage and injuries.

In 2014, a Umeme manager in Mubende was beaten severely by an infuriated mob during power-related protests at the Kasambya trading centre. The ensuing battle between rioters and security forces resulted in 15 arrests and one other injury, including a trader who was shot twice. Later that year, Kampala print and publishing shop owners went on strike, blocked Nasser road, and burnt paper and plastic to protest six-day power cuts along the road. Security forces used tear gas to disperse the protesters.

In November 2018, hundreds of people demonstrated in front of Umeme's office in Gulu Town in north Uganda. Many people involved in business were complaining that the frequent power outages raise their costs and prevent them from properly managing their ventures. The crowd was joined by MPs supportive of the protesters. Although the demonstration was peaceful, security forces fired teargas to stop it. One person was shot in the buttock.

=== Recommendations by parliament ===
In 2013, a probe committee of Uganda's Parliament recommended cancellation of Umeme's contract due to its chronic failure to provide reliable services, which would trigger a contract severance payment of at least US$148 million.

The following year, Uganda's Parliament recommended that Umeme's "contract should be terminated” due to the gross manipulations encountered in the procurement of the Umeme concession, and the scandalous provisions of the power distribution agreements signed between the government of Uganda and Umeme. Ultimately, this course of action was decided against because it would have been too expensive and politically complicated.

== Power losses ==
In June 2016, Umeme estimated its total power losses across its network at 19.1 percent. In September 2016, Umeme estimated that it lost UGX:106 billion annually from nonpayment of bills, vandalism, and illegal connections. Fifty-one percent of its losses come from the Bugisu sub-region in the Eastern Region.

In June 2015, Umeme estimated its power losses at 19.2 percent. Of that, 13 percent was attributable to technical losses (resulting from poor network configuration) and 6.2 percent was from commercial losses (such as power theft and under-billing). In 2017, Umeme's power losses were reduced to 17.2 percent. Umeme planned to reduce total power loss to 15 percent by 2018. According to Umeme, power losses had been reduced to 16.4 percent, as of December 2019.

In August 2021, Umeme's metering service manager, Christine Namutebi, announced the disconnection of over 8,000 illegal connections and the arrest of more than 4,000 individuals, for electricity theft and unauthorized connection to the national grid. The areas most violated by energy thieves include Kampala Metropolitan Area, Jinja Metropolitan Area, Mbale District, Masaka District and Mityana District.

== History ==
In May 2010, Umeme's communications director Charlotte Kemigyisha wrote a commentary in the Daily Monitor newspaper urging public support for President Yoweri Museveni's proposal to make electricity theft a capital offense.

In December 2010, Umeme announced plans to invest US$32 million during 2011 in new substations, improvements in grid connectivity, and the introduction of pre-payment systems.

In November 2013, Umeme announced that it had secured loans totaling US$190 million from the International Finance Corporation, Standard Chartered Bank, and Stanbic Bank to fund grid expansion and reduce energy losses.

Umeme spent US$440 million between 2013 and 2018 to overhaul equipment, buy technology, and add distribution points.

In March 2016, the Daily Monitor reported that Umeme had signed a contract with the Uganda Electricity Transmission Company Limited to distribute the power generated from the Isimba Hydroelectric Power Station, due online in 2018, and the Karuma Hydroelectric Power Station, due online in 2020.

In September 2016, a senior Umeme executive said that the company planned to spend US$2 billion over the next five years to expand the grid and increase access rates from an estimated 20 percent in 2016 (about 900,000 subscribers) to 40 percent in 2020 (about 3 million subscribers). In December 2017, Umeme announced plans to invest US$155 million in 2018, to improve the distribution network, build new substations and refurbish old networks across Uganda. In May 2018, in an interview with Reuters, Celestino Babungi, the CEO of Umeme, announced that the company planned to raise US$1.2 billion to revamp and expand the national distribution grid over the next seven years. A consultant was hired to advise and guide on how to raise the funds.

In June 2019, the Daily Monitor reported that Umeme planned to borrow US$70 million from the International Finance Corporation to add to the US$255 million raised internally, in order to invest in network upgrades and expansion while reducing network losses along with increased collection targets during the 2019–2024 time frame.

In December 2019, Umeme received a syndicated loan of US$70 million from four financial institutions as laid down in the table below. A portion of the loan will be utilized to set up distribution systems to effectively distribute power from Isimba and Karuma. Part of the loan will also support extension of power to industrial parks, upgrading Umeme's network, building the backbone on which more electricity connections will be supplied, accelerate prepayment metering and reduce energy losses. Two hundred and thirty thousand customers out of the 1.4 million customers that Umeme services, as of December 2019, are in the process of being converted from post-service billing to pre-paid metering. At that time, total energy losses stood at 16.7 percent, of which 11.7 percent were technical and 5 percent were commercial. As of December 2023, Umeme reported system losses of 16.2 percent, the lowest in the 20 years of the concession.

Umeme syndicated loan, December 2019: Sources
Rank	Lender	Amount in US dollars	Percentage	Notes
1	International Finance Corporation	28.00 million	40.00	Loan
2	Stanbic Bank Uganda Limited	16.0 million	22.85	Loan
3	Standard Chartered Uganda	16.0 million	22.85	Loan
4	Netherlands Development Finance Company	10.0 million	14.30	Loan
	Total	70.0 million	100.00	

== Customer base ==
As of January 2016, Umeme's customer base was about 790,000, with approximately 16,000 customers being added every month. The company expected its customer base to exceed 1 million by the end of 2016.

As at 30 June 2017, Umeme exceeded 1,000,000 paying customers, with the numbers growing at a rate of 13 percent annually.

According to the Daily Monitor, as of April 2018, Umeme had 1,125,291 customers. Seventy percent of those customers were on the pre-paid metering system, known as "Yaka". By June 2019, Umeme's customer base exceeded 1.4 million connections.

By July 2018, pre-paid metering covered an estimated 80 percent of all Umeme's customers. At that time, the customer mix was as illustrated in the table below:

Umeme customer profile as at July 2018
Rank	Customer type	% consumption	Cost per kWh (USD)
1	Industrial	65	0.10
2	Commercial	12	0.18
3	Domestic	23	0.20
	Total	100.00	

As of December 2018, Umeme serviced more than 1.3 million customers, representing an estimated 25 percent of Uganda's population.

As of December 2019, Umeme serviced in excess of 1.5 million customers, of whom 1.47 million (98 percent) were on the prepaid metering service called "Yaka". As of May 2020, Umeme expected to increase its customer base by 2 million to bring total number of customers to 3.5 million by 2025. In June 2020, the utility company expected to add 300,000 new customers to the network in 2020. At that time Umeme had plans to invest US$450 million (USh1.7 trillion), between 2019 and 2025, to (a) increase demand of electricity (b) increase reliability of supply (c) increase number of grid connections and (d) reduce power losses. By December 2020, Umeme's customer base had expanded to 1,530,000 customers, of whom an estimated 97 percent were on the pre-metered Yaka billing system.

According to the Electricity Regulatory Authority, the customer mix among Ugandan electricity consumers, as of June 2021, was as represented in the tab below.

Ugandan electricity consumer profile as at June 2021
Rank	Customer type	% Consumption
1	Extra large industrial customers	28
2	Large industrial customers	25
3	Medium industrial customers	14
4	Commercial customers	11
5	Domestic customers	22
	Total	100.00

== Customer growth ==
The table below represents the growth trajectory of the number of grid-connected customers in Uganda.

Number of grid-connected customers at end of year
Rank	Year	Customers	New customers	% growth
1	2014	698,359	–	–
2	2015	862,685	164,326	23.53
3	2016	991,882	125,197	14.51
4	2017	1,177,812	185,930	18.75
5	2018	1,352,735	174,923	14.85
6	2019	1,500,000+	147,265	10.89
7	2020	1,530,000	30,000	2.00
8	2021	1,636,431	106,431	6.95
9	2022	1,757,563	121,132	7.40
10	2023	1,950,000	192,437	10.95

== Infrastructure ==
As of May 2020, Umeme was responsible for the grid network at and below 33 kilovolts. At that time, the physical infrastructure available to Umeme included "over 33 substations and 12,631 transformers". Umeme was in the process of building another substation with two transformers to service the neighborhoods of Nansana, Kakiri and Wakiso, whose power needs are projected to grow between 15 and 20 percent in the next five years (2020–2025). The work will cost US$1.5 million (USh5 billion).

In August 2020, Umeme announced that it was in the process of improving the electricity connections to large industrial consumers in the vicinity of Mukono Municipality. The company was constructing seven dedicated double circuit supply lines from a substation in the settlement of Mbalala (not Mbarara) to each of (a) Katosi Water Works (b) Kampala Cement Company Limited (c) Tian Tang Group and (d) Landy Industries Limited, among others. These electrical upgrades, were expected to conclude in December 2020, and were expected to cost USh12.4 billion (US$3.4 million).

In July 2021, Umeme contracted the Egyptian firm Giza Systems, at a contract fee of USh7 billion (US$2 million), to build a new substation to serve the city of Entebbe. The substation will be constructed on land provided by National Water and Sewerage Corporation (NWSC). Beneficiaries include NWSC pumping and treatment station in Entebbe and Entebbe International Airport, which will receive stable power on a more consistent basis. Construction work is expected to conclude in December 2021.

== Negotiation of new contract ==
In December 2018, President Yoweri Museveni instructed Irene Muloni, Uganda's Energy Minister, to begin negotiations with Umeme regarding the renewal of the energy concession, when the current contract expires in 2025. The ministry of energy, the ministry of finance and the office of the attorney general will represent Uganda during these negotiations.

On 13 June 2019, during the reading of the national budget for the financial year 2019/2020, Uganda's Finance Minister, Matia Kasaija indicated that the government will extend Umeme's power distribution concession beyond 2025. Fresh negotiations will be held to finalize the details. Those negotiations started in February 2020.

== See also ==
- List of power stations in Uganda
- West Nile Rural Electrification Company
- Energy in Uganda
