= Florence Mawejje =

Ugandan businesswoman, human resource professional and corporate executive

- Born: 1967 (age 57–58); Uganda
- Education: Makerere University (Bachelor of Arts); University of Manchester (MSc in HR Development); Eastern and Southern African Management Institute (Executive MBA)
- Occupation(s): Businesswoman and Business Executive
- Years active: 1986 — present
- Title: General Manager of Human Resources at Centenary Bank

Florence Namatta Mawejje (née Florence Namatta), commonly known as Florence Mawejje is a Ugandan businesswoman, human resource professional and corporate executive, who serves as the General Manager for human resource at Centenary Rural Development Bank, a large commercial bank in Uganda.

== Education ==
Mawejje holds a Master of Science degree in Human Resources Development, obtained in 1993 from the University of Manchester in the United Kingdom. Later in 2004, she obtained an Executive Master of Business Administration, awarded jointly by the Eastern and Southern Africa Management Institute in East Africa and Maastricht School of Management in the Netherlands.

== Career ==
From 1996 until 1998, she worked as a human resource manager for Care International in Uganda, based in Kampala, the capital and largest city in the country. She was then hired by MTN Uganda in August 1998 as the Human Resources General Manager, where she worked for the next eleven years. In May 2009, Unilever hired her as the Human Resources Regional Director for Eastern and Southern Africa, responsible for the company's staff in 7 African countries. She served in that capacity for just over two years, until July 2011. In January 2012, Centenary Bank hired her as the Director of their Human Resource Division, a position she had served in for almost six years as of November 2017.

== Other considerations ==
Mawejje sits on a number of boards for public and private companies in Uganda. These include (a) Silver Spoon Limited, the operators of an international day-care, nursery and elementary school in Kampala, where she has been on the board since 1996 (b) NSSF Uganda, where she is a member of the Board of Trustees since 2015(c) Uganda Clays Limited, whose shares trade on the Uganda Securities Exchange (USE). She has been a member of that board since 2015 and (d) Umeme Limited, the largest electricity distributor in Uganda, whose shares trade on the USE and on the Nairobi Stock Exchange (NSE). She serves as a non-executive director of this company since April 2016.

== See also ==
- Florence Nsubuga
- Proscovia Nabbanja
- Donna Kusemererwa
