= Florence Nsubuga =

Ugandan businesswoman corporate executive (born 1973

- Born: 1973 (age 52–53); Uganda
- Citizenship: Uganda
- Education: Makerere University (Bachelor of Commerce) (Master of Arts in Economic Policy and Planning); Edinburgh Business School (Master of Business Administration); Harvard Business School (Executive Training in Corporate Governance)
- Occupations: Businesswoman and Business Executive
- Years active: 1996 — present
- Title: Chief executive officer of Berkeley Energy Uganda

Florence Nakimbugwe Nsubuga (née Florence Nakimbugwe), but commonly known as Florence Nsubuga, is a Ugandan businesswoman and corporate executive. Since February 2024, she is the chief executive officer and managing director of Berkeley Energy Uganda, the Ugandan subsidiary of Berkeley Energy, a United Kingdom-based conglomerate that invests in renewable energy in "emerging markets". As of 2024, the conglomerate was invested in nine jurisdictions and was a shareholder in over "30 renewable energy projects". She took up her current position in February 2024.

Before that, from 2012 until February 2024, she served as the chief operating officer (COO) of Umeme Limited, the largest electricity distribution company in Uganda, at the time, whose stock traded of the Uganda Securities Exchange and on the Nairobi Stock Exchange. From March 2015 until February 2024, she concurrently served as a member of the board of directors of Umeme.

== Background and education ==
She was born in the Central Region of Uganda, circa 1973. She attended local schools for her elementary and secondary school education. She obtained a Bachelor of Commerce (BCom) degree, specializing in Marketing, from Makerere University in 1996. She went on to obtain a Master of Arts (MA) degree, in Economic policy planning, also from Makerere. As of November 2017, she was pursuing a Master of Business Administration (MBA) from the University of Edinburgh, in Scotland. She also has undergone executive training from the Harvard Business School.

== Career ==
She began her career in 1996, at Uganda Electricity Distribution Company Limited (UEDCL), as a graduate trainee. When Umeme acquired the electricity distribution concession from UEDCL, she went with Umeme. Over the years, she was promoted until her appointment to the COO position in 2012. On the way to the top, she has served in various roles, including as (a) Delivery Controller (b) Regional Manager for Kampala East and (c) Outage Manager. In her capacity as COO of Umeme, she supervises 600 employees directly and another 1,000 people indirectly.

In February 2024, she left Umeme Limited and was appointed as CEO of Berkeley Energy Uganda.

== Other responsibilities ==
She is a married mother of two daughters, Sanyu and Suubi. In 2015, she won the Outstanding Woman in Energy - 2015 African Utility Week Award. She sits on the boards of BRAC Uganda Bank Limited and Jubilee Life Insurance Company (Uganda) Limited.

== See also ==
- Agnes Konde
- Jolly Kaguhangire
