= Diamond Trust Bank (Uganda) =

Commercial bank in Uganda

Coordinates: 00°18′47″N 32°35′01″E

Diamond Trust Bank (Uganda) Limited
- Company type: Private
- Industry: Financial services
- Founded: 1945; 81 years ago
- Headquarters: DTB Centre, Plot 17/19, Kampala Road, Kampala, Uganda
- Key people: Azim Kassam (Chairman); Godfrey Sebaana (CEO); Effective 2 April 2024
- Products: Loans, savings, checking, investments, debit cards, credit cards, mortgages
- Revenue: ▲:Aftertax: UGX:35.8 billion (US$9.223 million) (2022)
- Total assets: UGX:2.42 trillion (US$623.467 million) (2022)
- Number of employees: 680 (2024)
- Website: dtbu.dtbafrica.com

Diamond Trust Bank Uganda Limited (DTBUL), is a commercial bank headquartered in Uganda. It is licensed and supervised by the Bank of Uganda, the central bank and national banking regulator.

== Overview ==
As at December 2022, the bank's total assets were valued at about UGX:2.42 trillion (approximately US$623.467 million), with UGX:250 billion (approx. US$65 million) in shareholders' equity. As of 31 December 2022, DTBUL was the seventh largest commercial bank in Uganda by deposits. It was also the 8th largest commercial bank in the country, by assets. At that time it serviced an estimated 160,000 bank clients.

== History ==
The bank dates to 1945, when it was operating as the Diamond Jubilee Investment Trust (DJIT), with its head office in Dar es Salaam, Tanzania, and branches in Mombasa, Kenya and Kampala, Uganda. Branches were later opened at Nairobi and Kisumu in Kenya. The company was initially established as a community-based finance house, dedicated towards the extension of credit to the East African Ismaili Community and the mobilization of their savings. In 1965, DJIT was split into three entities, one each in Kenya, Tanzania, and Uganda.

In 1968, the rapid economic development of post-independence Uganda saw the founding of Diamond Trust Properties Uganda Limited. In 1972, Diamond Trust (Uganda) Limited (DTU) commenced operations as a non-bank financial institution. Between 1972 and the early 1990s, DTU was largely moribund because of political instability.

In 1995, the institution was recapitalized with the participation of the Aga Khan Fund for Economic Development and Diamond Trust Bank (Kenya) Limited. In 1997, the bank became a full-service commercial bank and was renamed Diamond Trust Bank (Uganda) Limited.

== Diamond Trust Bank Group ==
DTBU is a member of the Diamond Trust Bank Group, a large financial services provider with operations in Burundi, Kenya, Rwanda, Tanzania, and Uganda.

== Ownership ==
Diamond Trust Bank (Kenya) Limited owns at least 56.97 percent of the shares in Diamond Trust Bank (Uganda) Limited.

== See also ==
- Banking in Uganda
- List of banks in Uganda
- List of tallest buildings in Kampala
