= Githunguri =

- Location within Kenya
- Coordinates: 1.0586°S 36.7779°E
- County: Kiambu
- Country: Kenya
- Time zone: UTC+3 (EAT)
- Climate: Cfb

Githunguri is an agricultural town in Kiambu County in central Kenya's former Central Province. It is one of the administrative centres of Kiambu County and home to one of East Africa's largest dairy processing plant Fresha, which is owned by a farmers co-operative, Githunguri Dairy farmers cooperative Society. Most of the financial institutions have a presence in town. They include: TAI Sacco Ltd GDC Sacco, KCB, Family Bank, Equity Bank, Absa Bank, and Cooperative Bank. Githunguri Seniors is the main team currently playing in Kenya football league division 2 Zone A.(2023/2024 season).

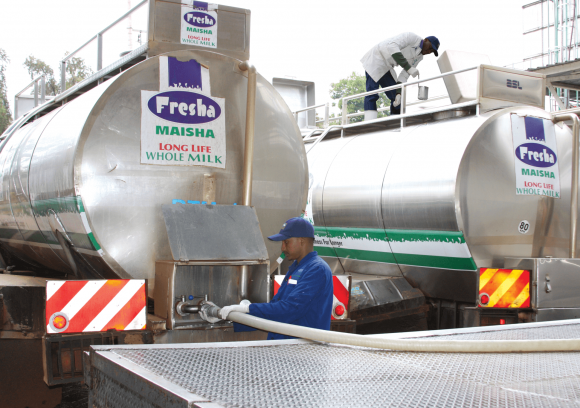
Fresha Factory located in Githunguri

The other economic activities include tea, coffee, pig, poultry and horticultural farming.
