= Adema Sangale =

Kenyan businesswoman

- Born: May 1977 (age 49); Kenya
- Citizenship: Kenya
- Education: United States International University Africa (Bachelor of Science in Management Information Systems); University of Oxford (Master of Business Administration); Harvard University (Master of Public Administration)
- Occupations: Businesswoman, corporate executive
- Years active: 2001 to present
- Title: Managing partner at C-Suite Africa, Nairobi, Kenya

Adema Sangale is a businesswoman, social entrepreneur and corporate executive in Kenya, who is the managing partner of C-Suite Africa, a business consultancy firm, based in Nairobi, the capital and largest city of Kenya. Her focus is advising locally owned businesses to transition from founder-managed to larger brand-driven, multi-country enterprises.

== Education ==
Sangale attended The Kenya High School from 1989 to 1992. She holds a Bachelor of Science degree in Management Information Systems, obtained from the United States International University Africa in Nairobi in 1997. She then received a Chevening Scholarship to study at the University of Oxford in the United Kingdom, graduating with a Master of Business Administration in 2006. In 2015, she graduated with a Master of Public Administration, from the Harvard Kennedy School, in Cambridge, Massachusetts, United States.

== Career ==
Sangale joined Procter and Gamble following a university recruitment programme. Her first position was Assistant Brand Manager for Pampers and Always brands in Kenya. Later, Nigeria and Poland were added to her docket. Over time she quickly rose through the ranks and was appointed managing director for East Africa. While there, she pioneered the 'bottom of the pyramid' solution and brought to light the predicament of girls having to miss school during their menses, on account of being unable to afford sanitary pads.

She led the efforts to bring together a coalition of stakeholders from government, media and civil society to abolish taxation on sanitary pads. The key insight was that economically disadvantaged girls missed 4–5 days of school per month because they could not afford effective menstrual protection methods such as sanitary pads.

This work spread to countries in sub-Saharan Africa and the Indian sub-continent, and was featured in a US advertising campaign for the Always brand. This was later featured in the New York Times.

In 2004, Sangale became the youngest local CEO to head a multinational company in Kenya at the age of 27. Simultaneously, she held the same position in an office which she ran from South Africa whereby she used to oversee marketing and communications across sub-Saharan Africa including in Angola, Ethiopia, Mozambique, Zambia, Uganda, Tanzania, Namibia, Rwanda and Kenya. Her most recent role in Canada included integrating marketing and brand communications for the fast-moving consumer goods conglomerate in the North American country.

After she left Procter and Gamble in December 2013, having spent more than 13 years there, she spent one year at the Nairobi-based United Nations Environment Programme as the Chief of Brand Building. She then spent another twelve months at World Bicycle Relief, an international non-profit that aims to reduce poverty in developing countries around the world. After that, she went into private consulting at C-Suites Africa, effective January 2018.

== Other considerations ==
In August 2013, the Nairobi-based Business Daily Africa newspaper named Sangale among "Kenya's Top 40 Under 40 Women in 2013".

She was nominated as a New Generation Leader by the African Leadership Network. Sangale also served as past chair of the Business Women's Initiative in Kenya, an initiate founded by Mary Robinson, former president of Ireland. She is currently the Chair of the Harvard Africa Alumni Network.

Sangale is a contributor to the Nairobi-based English language newspaper Daily Nation.
