= Kenya Post Office Savings Bank =

Savings bank in Kenya

- Type: State owned
- Industry: Banking
- Founded: 1910
- Headquarters: Nairobi, Kenya
- Key people: Raphael Lekolool (Managing Director)
- Products: Group Savings, Savings, Investments, Debit Cards
- Revenue: KES:1.9 billion (2009)
- Total assets: KES:15.4 billion (2009)
- Number of employees: 500
- Website: www.postbank.co.ke

Kenya Post Office Savings Bank, often referred to as Postbank, is a Savings Bank in Kenya. Unlike other commercial banks in Kenya that are licensed and regulated by the Central Bank of Kenya, Postbank is regulated by the Kenya Post Office Savings Bank Act Cap 493B. This gives it a unique feature where interest income earned by depositors is exempt from tax.

== History ==
Postbank was established in 1910, making it possible for Africans to save in the then British East Africa. The accounts in East African rupee. By 1931, the institution offered similar services East Africa and one could use their account from anywhere in Kenya, Tanzania and Uganda. This continued till the breakup of the East African Community in 1977 after which the Bank focused its attention to the Kenyan market.

The bank is an agent of MoneyGram, Western Union and Ria Money Transfer and offers Banking agency services for Credit Bank NCBA Bank Group and ABSA Bank (Kenya) Stanbic Bank

The bank has also partnered with Premier Credit Ltd and Fincredit Ltd to offer loans to pensioners

== Ownership ==
As of March 2024, Postbank is a fully owned by the Government of Kenya and reports to the National Treasury.

=== Governance ===
Governance of the Bank is vested in the Board of Directors and the office of the Managing Director, supported by one Directorate and departments. The bank is wholly owned by the Government of Kenya and reports to the Ministry of Finance. The Government is represented at the board of directors by the Cabinet Secretary, Treasury.

== See also ==
- List of banks in Kenya
- Central Bank of Kenya
- Economy of Kenya
