= Institute of Certified Public Accountants of Kenya =

- ICPAK Official Logo
- Abbreviation: ICPAK
- Established: 1978; 48 years ago
- Type: Professional Association
- Professional title: Certified Public Accountant - Kenya
- Headquarters: CPA Centre, Nairobi, Kenya
- Region served: Kenya
- Services: Accountancy
- Key people: CPA Prof Elizabeth Kalunda (Chairman); CPA Dr. Grace Kamau, PhD (CEO)
- Website: www.icpak.com

The Institute of Certified Public Accountants of Kenya (ICPAK) is a professional body for certified public accountants (CPAs) in Kenya. ICPAK is a full member of the International Federation of Accountants and the Pan African Federation of Accounting.

The Institute of Certified Public Accountants of Kenya (ICPAK) is the statutory body established under the Accountants Act No. 15 of 2008 to develop and regulate the accountancy profession in Kenya.

ICPAK is a member of the International Federation of Accountants (IFAC) and the Pan African Federation of Accountants (PAFA), which are global and regional bodies representing the accountancy profession.

== Governance ==
ICPAK is governed by a twelve-person council is chaired by CPA Prof Elizabeth Kalunda as the National Chairman and Dr Grace Kamau (PhD) as the CEO.

== KCA University ==
ICPAK founded Kenya College of Accountancy (KCA) in May 1989 to improve the quality of accountancy and financial management training in the country. The college applied to the Commission for Higher Education (CHE) for university status in the year 2000 and received a Letter of Interim Authority (LIA) on 26 July 2007 to operate as a university. The institution's name was thus changed to KCA University.

KCA University shares it main campus with the ICPAK headquarters and maintains satellite colleges under the School of Professional Programmes in Githunguri, Kericho, Eldoret, Kisumu and Kitengela.
