= Family Bank =

Kenyan commercial bank

- Company type: Private
- Industry: Financial services
- Founded: 1984; 42 years ago
- Headquarters: Nairobi, Kenya
- Key people: Wilfred Kiboro (chairman); Nancy Njau (managing director & CEO)
- Products: Loans, checking, savings, investments, debit cards
- Revenue: ▼Aftertax: US$10.1 million (KES: 1.0 billion) (2017)
- Total assets: US$696 million (KES: 69.12 billion) (2017)
- Number of employees: 1,324 (2019)
- Website: familybank.co.ke

Family Bank Limited (FBL), commonly known as Family Bank, is a commercial bank in Kenya, the largest economy in the East African Community. It is licensed by the Central Bank of Kenya, the central bank and national banking regulator.

== Overview ==
Family Bank is a medium-sized commercial bank in Kenya. As of 31 December 2017, the bank's total assets were valued at KSh69.12 billion (approximately US$696 million), with shareholders' equity of KSh11.75 billion (approximately US$118.3 million).

== History ==
The bank was founded in 1984 as Family Finance Building Society Limited. Titus Muya, the former non-executive chairman of Family Bank, served as the founding chairman and chief executive officer for the bank's first 23 years. In 2007, it became a commercial bank, following the issuance of a banking license by the Central Bank of Kenya, the country's banking regulator. Titus Muya resigned as CEO of the re-branded Family Bank Limited, to comply with current Kenyan banking regulations. Since converting to a commercial bank, FBL has been pursuing an expansion of its branch network.

In 2010, the bank diversified into the insurance industry through a subsidiary Dhamana Insurance Agency.

In 2013, the bank acquired a building in central Nairobi that serves as its headquarters and is currently undergoing renovation to carry its corporate image. This is the same building where founder Muya had rented a small space that served as both a branch and his office.

== Ownership ==
The shares of stock of FBL are privately owned by institutional and individual investors. In October 2010, a consortium consisting of private equity firm AfricInvest, based in Tunisia, FMO of the Netherlands and Norway's Norfund, acquired a 25% stake in Family Bank for a cash sum of US$14.3 million. Two years later, that stake was sold to two Kenyan corporations, for an estimated price of US$21.3 million (KES: 1.84 billion). The company shares are traded over-the-counter, with plans to list on the Nairobi Stock Exchange (NSE) in the future.

As of June 2015, the bank's shareholding was as follows:

Family Bank stock ownership
| Rank | Name of owner | Percentage ownership |
|---|---|---|
| 1 | Kenya Tea Development Agency | 15.45 |
| 2 | Estate of Rachel Njeri Muya | 13.42 |
| 3 | Daykio Plantations Limited | 12.30 |
| 4 | Titus Kiondo Muya | 5.34 |
| 5 | Standard Chartered Kenya Nominees A/C 9660B | 3.73 |
| 6 | PA Securities | 3.57 |
| 7 | Kenya Orient Insurance Ltd | 2.86 |
| 8 | Julius Brian Kiondo Muyah | 2.69 |
| 9 | Ann Njeri | 2.68 |
| 10 | Mark Keriri | 2.68 |
| 11 | Others | 35.27 |
| | Total | 100.00 |

== Branch network ==
In February 2021, the bank opened its 92nd networked brick-and-mortar branch, in the Nairobi neighborhood called Eastleigh. At that time, Family Bank maintained branches in 34 out of Kenya's 47 counties.

== Governance ==
The chairman of the board of directors is Wilfred D. Kiboro, one of the non-executive directors. Nancy Njau is the chief executive officer, effective 2 January 2024.

== See also ==
- List of banks in Kenya
- Central Bank of Kenya
- Economy of Kenya
