= Credit Bank =

Commercial bank in Kenya

- Company type: Private
- Industry: Financial services
- Founded: 1986
- Headquarters: Nairobi, Kenya
- Key people: Simeon Nyachae (chairman); Betty Maritim Korir (managing director)
- Products: Loans, checking, savings, investments, debit cards
- Revenue: ▲Aftertax: US$2.56 million (KES: 256 million) (2018)
- Total assets: US$200million (KES: 27.805 billion) (2018)
- Website: creditbank.co.ke

Credit Bank Limited (CBL), commonly referred to as Credit Bank, is a commercial bank in Kenya, the largest economy in the East African Community. It is licensed by the Central Bank of Kenya, the central bank and national banking regulator.

== Overview ==
The bank is a medium-sized commercial bank in Kenya, East Africa's largest economy. Prior to 2010, the bank's focus was large corporations and upscale business-people. In September 2010, Credit Bank changed strategy and transformed into a retail bank, serving all segments of society and their businesses. As of December 2018, the bank's total assets were valued at approximately US$178.28 million (KES:17.805 billion), with shareholders' equity valued at US$28.67 million (KES:2.86 billion).

== History ==
The bank was founded in 1986 as the non-bank financial institution (NBFI) Credit Kenya Limited. In 1995, the institution was awarded a commercial banking license and it rebranded to Credit Bank Limited.

== Ownership ==
As at January 2016, the shares of stock of Credit Bank are privately owned by corporate and individual investors. In January 2016, Fountain Enterprises Programme Group (FEP) announced plans to acquire a controlling 75 per cent stake in Credit Bank for KSh4 billion (approx. US$40 million), pending approval of the Central Bank of Kenya. As of June 2019, the major shareholders in the bank's stock were as depicted in the table below:

Credit Bank Limited stock ownership
Rank	Name of owner	Percentage ownership
1	Nyachae’s Sansora Group	14.96
2	Sanama Investment	14.34
2	Ketan Morjaria	9.88
3	Jay Karia	8.61
4	Fountain Enterprises Programme Group (FEP)	5.00
5	Others	47.21
	Total	100.00

== Branches ==
The bank maintains networked branches at the following locations:

1. Main Branch - Mercantile House, Koinange Street, Nairobi
2. Westland Branch - Empress Plaza, Ring Road, Westlands, Nairobi
3. Industrial Area Branch - 53 Butere Road, Industrial Area, Nairobi
4. Lavington Branch - Lavington Mall, James Gichuru Road, Lavington, Nairobi
5. Kisumu Branch - Swan Centre, Oginga Odinga Road, Kisumu
6. Kitengela Branch - 2nd Floor, Safari House, Namanga Road, Kitengela
7. Nakuru Branch I - Giddo Plaza, Eldoret-Nakuru Highway, Nakuru
8. Kisii Branch - Hospital Road, Kisii
9. Mombasa Nkrumah Branch - Taiyebi House, Nkrumah Road, Mombasa
10. Eldoret Branch - Zion Mall, Uganda Road, Eldoret
11. Ongata Rongai Branch - Maasai Mall, Magadi Road, Ongata Rongai
12. Machakos Branch - Mbolu-Malu Road, Machakos
13. Thika Branch - Second Floor, Biashara Plaza, Mama Ngina Street, Thika
14. Nyali Branch - Nyali Centre, Link Road, Nyali
15. One Africa Branch - 2nd Floor, One Africa Place, Waiyaki Way, Westlands, Nairobi
16. New Nairobi Branch - Nairobi
17. Meru Branch - Meru
18. Eldoret Branch - Kerio Valley Development Authority Building, Oloo Street, Eldoret

== See also ==
- List of banks in Kenya
- Central Bank of Kenya
- Economy of Kenya
