= Diamond Trust Bank Group =

African banking group

- Company type: Public
- Traded as: KN: DTK
- Industry: Banking
- Founded: 1945
- Headquarters: DTB Centre; Mombasa Road; Nairobi, Kenya
- Key people: Linus Gitahi; Chairman; Nasim Devji; Group CEO
- Products: Banks, mortgages investments
- Revenue: US$367 million (KES:40.21 billion) (2021)
- Total assets: US$4.166+ billion (KES:456.84 billion) (2021)
- Website: www.dtbafrica.com

Diamond Trust Bank Group, in short DTB Group, is an African banking group active in Burundi, Kenya, Tanzania, and Uganda. The flagship company of the group, Diamond Trust Bank Kenya, is licensed by the Central Bank of Kenya, the central bank and national banking regulator in Kenya, the largest economy in the East African Community.

== Location ==
DTB Group's main offices are located at Diamond Trust Bank Centre (DTBC), along Mombasa Road in Nairobi, Kenya.

== Overview ==
The flagship of DTB Group is Diamond Trust Bank (Kenya), which was founded in 1946. As of December 2013, the group is ranked the eighth largest commercial bank, by assets, out of 43 licensed banks in Kenya. At that time, the group's total assets were approximately US$1.924 billion (KES:166.52 billion), with shareholders' equity of about US$242.1 million (KES:20.95 billion). As of 2018, it ranked 5th.

The group works in collaboration with the Habib Bank of the Aga Khan Fund for Economic Development and the International Finance Corporation of the World Bank. In July 2017, the Diamond Trust Bank Group acquired 100% ownership of the former "Habib Bank Kenya". The new acquisition merged with Diamond Trust Bank Kenya, effective 1 August 2017. As part of the new acquisition, DTB Group has agreed to retain 41 former Habib Bank employees.

== Member companies ==
DTB Group includes the following companies:

=== Subsidiaries ===
1. Diamond Trust Bank (Kenya) Limited - Retail banking - Nairobi, Kenya 100% Shareholding - A commercial bank in Kenya, serving individuals and businesses. This is the flagship company of the group, accounting for 6.4% of banking assets in Kenya, as at December 2016.
2. Diamond Trust Bank (Uganda) Limited - Retail banking - Kampala, Uganda 54.1% Shareholding - A commercial bank in Uganda, serving both individuals and businesses.
3. Diamond Trust Bank (Tanzania) Limited - Retail banking - Dar es Salaam, Tanzania 62.9% Shareholding - A commercial bank in Tanzania, serving both individuals and businesses.
4. Diamond Trust Bank (Burundi) Limited - Retail banking - Bujumbura, Burundi 67.3% Shareholding - A commercial bank in Bujumbura, serving individuals and businesses.
5. Diamond Trust Insurance Agency Limited - Bancassurance - Nairobi, Kenya 100% Shareholding - This unit offers Bancassurance services.
6. Diamond Trust Bank (Rwanda) Limited - Retail banking - Kigali, Rwanda - In development.
7. Premier Savings and Finance Limited - Dormant - Nairobi, Kenya 100% Shareholding.

=== Associates companies to the group ===
- Jubilee Insurance Company of Burundi - Insurance - Bujumbura, Burundi - 20% Shareholding - An insurance company in Burundi. A member of Jubilee Insurance Company Limited. Jubilee Insurance which shares a common shareholder with Diamond Trust Bank (i.e. AKFED) holds 80 percent of the venture.
- Services and Systems Limited - (Dormant) - Nairobi, Kenya - 40 percent Shareholding.

== Ownership ==
The shares of the Diamond Trust Bank Group are listed on the Nairobi Stock Exchange. As of July 2017, the major shareholders in the Group's stock, are depicted in the table below:

Diamond Trust Bank Group Stock Ownership
Rank	Name of Owner	Percentage Ownership
1	Aga Khan Fund for Economic Development (AKFED)	16.50
2	HBL Pakistan of Pakistan part of AKFED	16.15
3	Jubilee Insurance company of Kenya part of AKFED	9.95
4	Standard Chartered Nominees A/C Ke18972	2.78
5	Standard Chartered Nominee A/C Ke18965	2.23
6	The Diamond Jubilee Investment Trust (U) Limited, a subsidiary of AKFED	1.37
7	Others via Nairobi Securities Exchange	51.02
	Total	100.00

== Criminal Summons In Uganda ==
In September 2021, DTB Group Top Management including the Aga Khan, Nasim Devji Mohamed, the group Chief Executive Officer, Varghese Thambi the DTB Uganda Managing Director and John Sitakange the head of credit for DTB Uganda were summoned in Uganda by the Buganda Road Magistrates Court to retort charges of theft, electronic fraud, making fabricated entries in financial ledgers, computer misuse, emitting false documents and conspiracy to commit crime in contravention of; section 254 of the Penal Code Act Cap 120, section 47 (1) and (3) of the financial Institutions Act of 2004, section 19 of the computer misuse Act, section 351 of the Penal Code Act 120 and section 360 of Penal Code Act 120 of the Constitution of Uganda following the Bank's Conviction of fraud by the High Court in Uganda in a civil suite 43 of 2020 filed by Hamis Kiggundu after the bank had allegedly defrauded over $30Million from his bank accounts.

== Branch network ==
As of August 2014 DTB Group maintains a total of nearly 100 branches in the East African countries where it operates. In May 2012, Kenyan press reports indicated that the group planned expansion into Rwanda, the Democratic Republic of the Congo, Mozambique and South Sudan by 2020.

== See also ==
- List of banks in Kenya
