= List of companies of Tanzania =

Location of Tanzania

Tanzania has the second largest economy in the East African Community and the tenth largest in Africa. It is largely dependent on agriculture for employment, accounting for about half of the employed workforce. An estimated 34 percent of Tanzanians currently live in poverty. The economy has been transitioning from a planned economy to a market economy since 1985. Although total GDP has increased since these reforms began, GDP per capita dropped sharply at first, and only exceeded the pre-transition figure in around 2007.

== Notable firms ==
This list includes notable companies with primary headquarters located in the country. The industry and sector follow the Industry Classification Benchmark framework. Organizations which have ceased operations are included and noted as defunct.

Notable companies Status: P=Private, S=State; A=Active, D=Defunct
Name	Industry	Sector	Headquarters	Founded	Notes	Status	
Air Excel	Consumer services	Airlines	Arusha	1997	Commercial/charter airline	P	A
Air Tanzania	Consumer services	Airlines	Dar es Salaam	1977	State-owned airline	S	A
Airtel Tanzania	Telecommunications	Mobile telecommunications	Dar es Salaam	2010	Previously known as Celtel Tanzania, subsidiary of Bharti Airtel (India)	P	A
Auric Air	Consumer services	Airlines	Mwanza	2001	Private airline	P	A
Bakhresa Group	Conglomerates	-	Dar es Salaam	1983	Food & beverage, industrial transportation, construction materials	P	A
Bank of Tanzania	Financials	Banks	Dar es Salaam	1965	Central bank	S	A
Coastal Aviation	Consumer services	Airlines	Dar es Salaam	1987	Charter airline	P	A
Daily News	Consumer services	Publishing	Dar es Salaam	1972	Government-owned English newspaper	S	A
Dangote Industries Tanzania	Industrials	Building materials & fixtures	Mtwara	2015	Cement, part of Dangote Cement (Nigeria)	P	A
Dar es Salaam Stock Exchange	Financials	Investment services	Dar es Salaam	1996	National Stock Exchange	S	A
Eagle Air	Consumer services	Airlines	Dar es Salaam	1999	Charter airline, defunct 2002	P	D
Fastjet Tanzania	Consumer services	Airlines	Dar es Salaam	2011	Low-cost airline	P	A
Flightlink	Consumer services	Airlines	Dar es Salaam	2004	Scheduled and charter airline	P	A
MIC Tanzania Limited (tiGO)	Telecommunications	Mobile telecommunications	Dar es Salaam	1993	Mobile network, part of Millicom (Luxembourg)	P	A
MeTL Group	Conglomerates	-	Dar es Salaam	1970s	Food & beverage, agriculture, manufacturing (especially consumer goods), trading, logistics, and financial services	P	A
Mwananchi Communications	Consumer services	Broadcasting & entertainment	Dar es Salaam	1999	Part of the Nation Media Group (Kenya)	P	A
Nyati Cement	Industrials	Building materials & fixtures	Dar es Salaam	2014	Cement	P	A
Precision Air	Consumer services	Airlines	Dar es Salaam	1993	Airline	P	A
Regional Air	Consumer services	Airlines	Arusha	1997	Airline, part of Airkenya Express (Kenya)	P	A
Safari Plus	Consumer services	Airlines	Dar es Salaam	2011	Charter airline	P	A
Sasatel	Telecommunications	Mobile telecommunications	Dar es Salaam	2005	Mobile network	P	A
Smile Communications Tanzania Limited (Smile)	Telecommunications	Mobile telecommunications	Dar es Salaam	2009	Mobile network	P	A
Swala Gas and Oil	Oil & gas	Exploration & production	Dar es Salaam	2011	Exploration	P	A
Tanzania Petroleum Development Corporation	Oil & gas	Exploration & production	Dar es Salaam	1969	State-owned oil	S	A
Tanzania Posts Corporation	Industrials	Delivery services	Dar es Salaam	1994	Postal services	S	A
Tanzania Electric Supply Company Limited (TANESCO)	Utilities	Conventional electricity	Dar es Salaam	1964	State-run utility	S	A
Tanzanair	Consumer services	Airlines	Dar es Salaam	1969	Charter airline	P	A
Tanzania Breweries Limited	Consumer goods	Brewery	Dar es Salaam	1933	Beer	P	A
Tanzania Cigarette Company	Consumer goods	Tobacco	Dar es Salaam	1961	Cigarettes	P	A
Tanzania Government Flight Agency	Consumer services	Airlines	Dar es Salaam	2002	State-owned airline	S	A
Tanzania Railways Corporation	Industrials	Railroads	Dar es Salaam	1977	State-owned enterprise	S	A
Tanzania Telecommunications Corporation	Telecommunications	Fixed line telecommunications	Dar es Salaam	1993	Telecom	P	A
TIPER (Tanzanian and Italian Petroleum Refining Company Limited)	Industrials	Transportation services	Dar es Salaam	1999	Oil terminal	P	A
Tropical Air	Consumer services	Airlines	Zanzibar	1999	Charter airline	P	A
Twiga Cement	Industrials	Building materials & fixtures	Dar es Salaam	1966	Cement	P	A
Viettel Tanzania (Halotel)	Telecommunications	Mobile telecommunications	Dar es Salaam	2015	Subsidiary of Viettel (Vietnam)	P	A
Vodacom Tanzania	Telecommunications	Mobile telecommunications	Dar es Salaam	1999	Subsidiary of Vodafone (UK)	P	A
ZanAir	Consumer services	Airlines	Zanzibar	1992	Airline	P	A

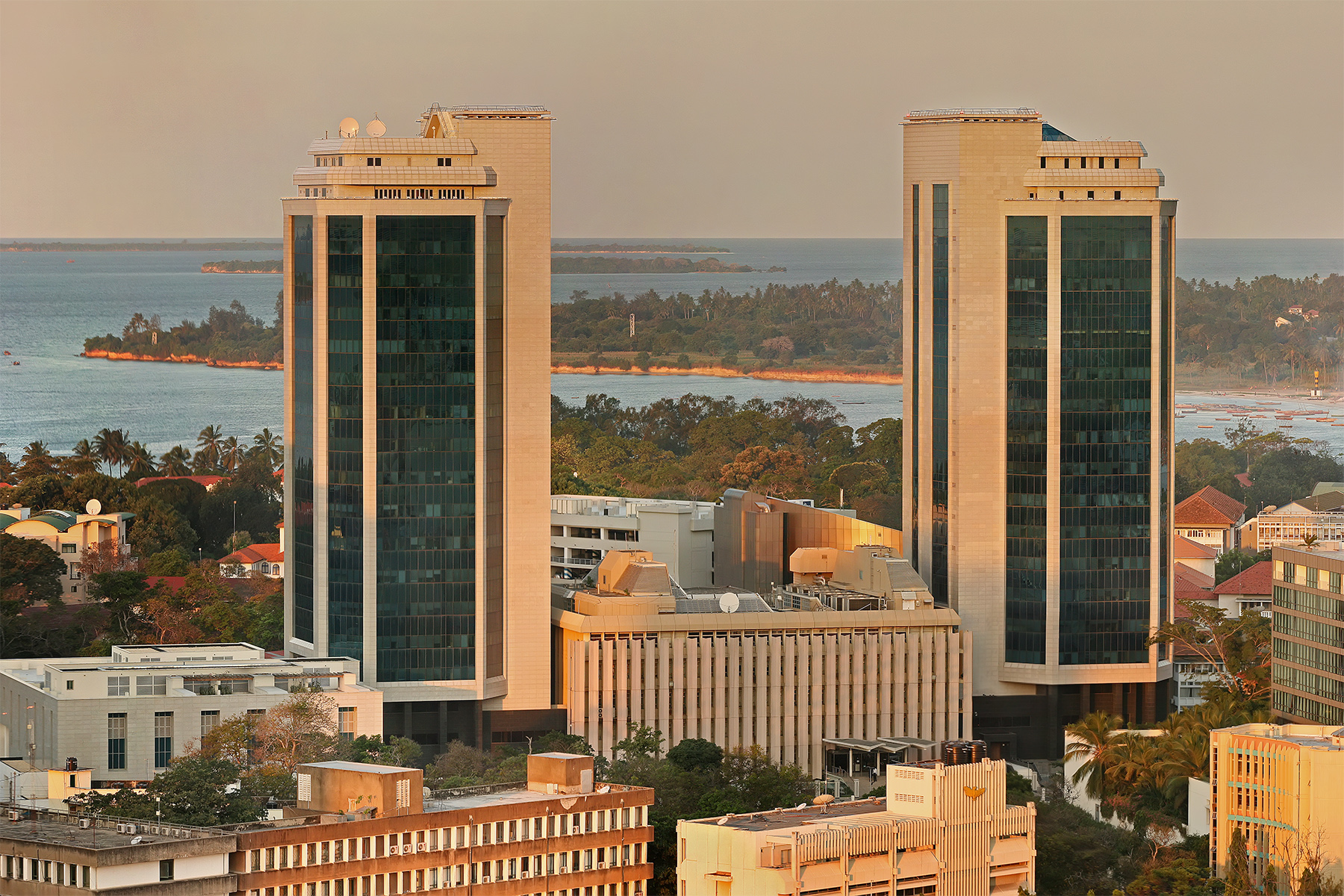
Bank of Tanzania Twin Towers

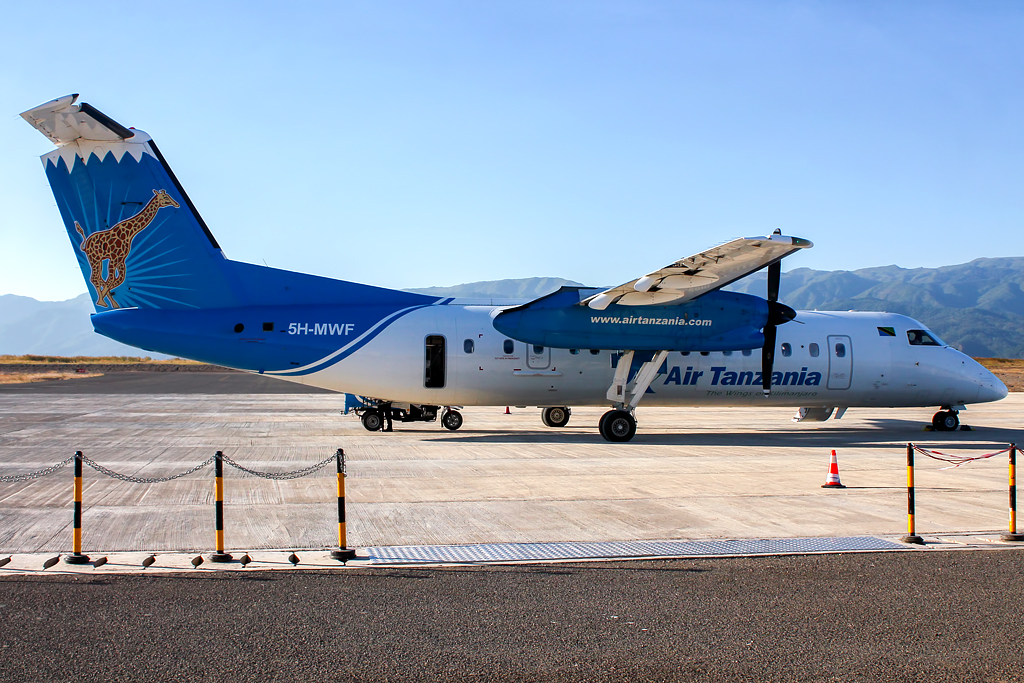
Air Tanzania is the flag carrier

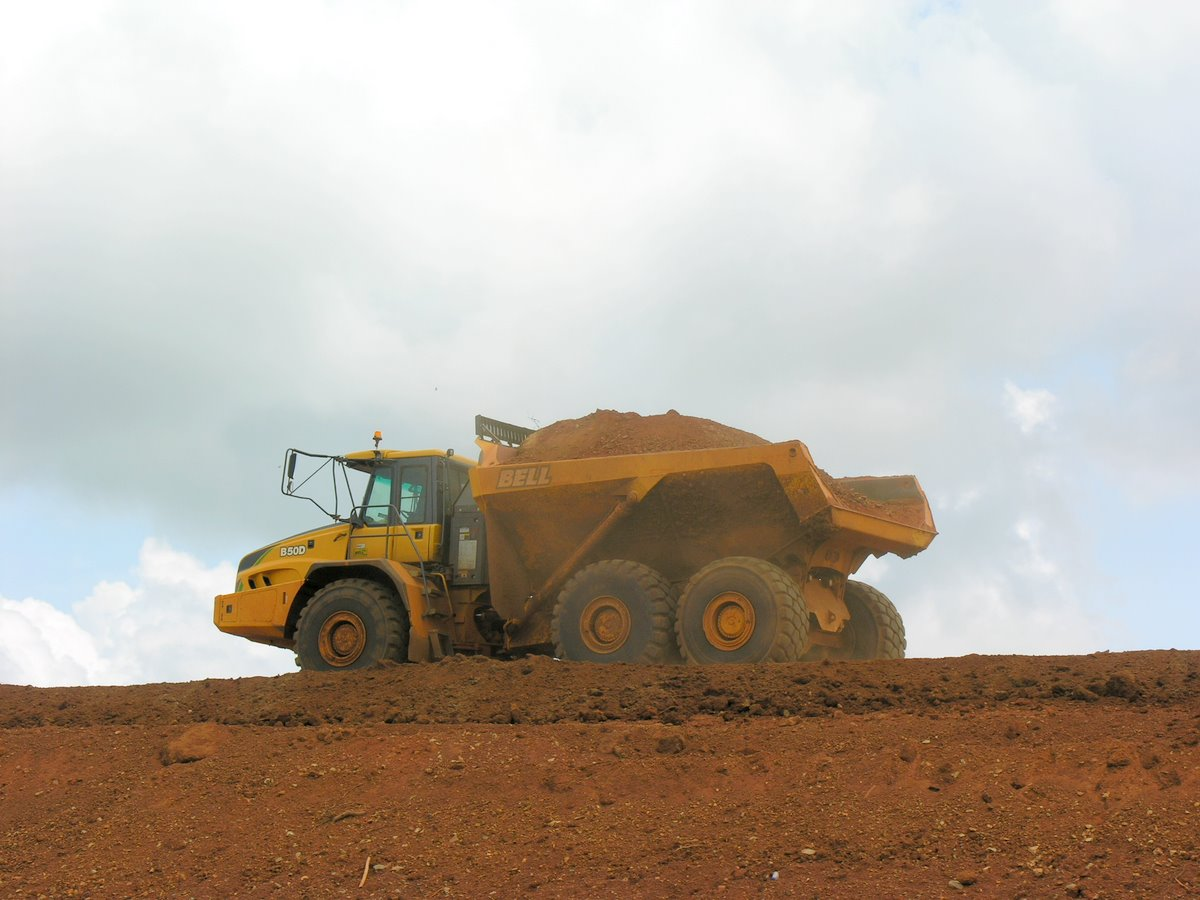
Buzwagi Gold Mine in the Shinyanga Region, operated by Acacia Mining (UK)

== See also ==
- List of banks in Tanzania
- The Tanzania Chamber of Commerce, Industry and Agriculture
