= Agricom Africa Limited =

Tanzanian agricultural equipment company

- Industry: Agricultural machinery
- Founded: 2009
- Founder: Angelina Ngalula
- Headquarters: Dar es Salaam, Tanzania
- Products: Tractors, power tillers, combine harvesters and agricultural implements
- Website: agricom.co.tz

Agricom Africa Limited is a Tanzanian company that supplies agricultural machinery and farm equipment. The company was established in 2009 by Angelina Ngalula and is headquartered in Dar es Salaam. Its activities include distribution of tractors, power tillers, combine harvesters and agricultural implements and participation in agricultural-equipment financing programs.

== History ==
Agricom Africa was established in 2009 by Angelina Ngalula.

In 2013, Agricom was awarded a contract to supply fertiliser to the Western Tobacco Growers Cooperative Union (WETCU). The agreement covered 9,809.5 tonnes of NPK fertiliser and 2,526.45 tonnes of calcium ammonium nitrate fertiliser and was valued at approximately US$10.37 million. The procurement later became the subject of a government review after concerns were raised about the tender process.

In 2021, Agricom and LonAgro participated as equipment-supply partners in the Tanzania Agricultural Development Bank's Matrekta Loan programme. The programme provided financing for agricultural machinery including tractors, combine harvesters, planters and ploughs.

In June 2021, the Tanzania Agricultural Development Bank entered into arrangements with Agricom to finance agricultural machinery, for which it reported that it had disbursed TSh12 billion for the purchase of 199 agricultural machines through its mechanization activities, including 90 tractors and 19 combine harvesters.

In June 2023, NMB Bank Tanzania entered into an agricultural equipment-financing arrangement with Agricom. Under the arrangement, farmers who qualified could get financing for tractors and other agricultural equipment from Agricom, with borrowers required to make a 20 per cent down payment and the bank financing the balance.

In August 2023 Stanbic Bank Tanzania signed a memorandum of understanding with Agricom on financing of agricultural machinery and equipment.

In August 2024, President Samia Suluhu Hassan laid the foundation stone for a planned tractor assembly plant in Dodoma involving Agricom and Indian agricultural equipment manufacturer Mahindra & Mahindra. The event coincided with the handover of 500 tractors, 800 power tillers and other agricultural equipment under Tanzania's agricultural mechanization programme. The project was part of Tanzania's broader agriculture-mechanization program and included plans for machinery leasing centers for farmers.

== Operations ==
Agricom supplies machinery and implements used for agricultural production. Equipment documented in programmes involving the company includes tractors, power tillers, combine harvesters, planters and ploughs.

The company also provides agricultural equipment through financing arrangements involving financial institutions. Its documented financing partners have included the Tanzania Agricultural Development Bank, NMB Bank Tanzania and Stanbic Bank Tanzania.

Agricom has been engaged in the development of tractor-assembly and agricultural-mechanization operations in Dodoma. Agricom has also been engaged in machinery financing arrangements with TADB, NMB Bank and Stanbic Bank Tanzania.

=== 2013 fertiliser tender dispute ===
In September 2013, WETCU entered into an agreement with Agricom for the supply of 9,809.5 tonnes of NPK fertilizer and 2,526.45 tonnes of calcium ammonium nitrate fertilizer. The deal was worth around US$10.37 million.

Tabora Regional Commissioner Fatma Mwassa challenged the procurement, asking if enough due diligence was done on Agricom and if it met the tender requirements. Agriculture and Cooperatives Minister Christopher Chiza subsequently appointed a task force to review the procurement. He later said that the issues with the tender process had been identified by experts from agriculture and finance ministries.

A subsequent report by The Citizen said that approximately 50 local bidders had been disqualified right away for failing to meet tender criteria. Later, the procurement board selected Agricom Africa, Export Trading and Yara to supply portions of the fertilizer requirement.

== See also ==
- Agriculture in Tanzania
- Agricultural machinery
- Mechanised agriculture
