= List of cement manufacturers in Tanzania =

This is a list of companies that manufacture cement in Tanzania.

- Dangote Industries Tanzania
- Lake Cement Limited
- Tanga Cement Plc
- Camel Cement Company
- Kilimanjaro Cement Limited
- Lee Building Materials Limited
- ARM Cement Tanzania Limited
- Mbeya Cement Company Limited
- Tanzania Portland Cement Limited
- Huaxin Cement MLL (formerly Rhino cement)
- Sinoma and Hengya Cement Tanzania (in development)
- Mtwara Cement Limited
- Kisarawe Cement Company Limited

== Production ==
As of April 2016, Tanzania cement manufacturers were producing an estimated 2.8 million tonnes, with Tanzania Portland Cement Limited being the production leader, accounting for 36 percent of the total, followed by Tanga Cement Plc and Dangote Industries Tanzania. In addition to local production, Tanzania was projected to import as estimated 700,000 metric tonnes in 2016.

By December 2016, five new manufacturers had set up factories in the country, raising annual installed capacity to 10.8 metric tonnes, with total production in 2016, amounting to 7.1 million tonnes. Annual consumption in 2016 was 4.1 million tonnes, with the balance sold to regional neighbors, including Burundi and the Democratic Republic of the Congo.

== See also ==
- List of cement manufacturers in Rwanda
- List of cement manufacturers in Uganda
- List of companies and cities in Africa that manufacture cement
