= Yetu Microfinance =

Tanzanian microfinance bank

Yetu Microfinance Bank PLC
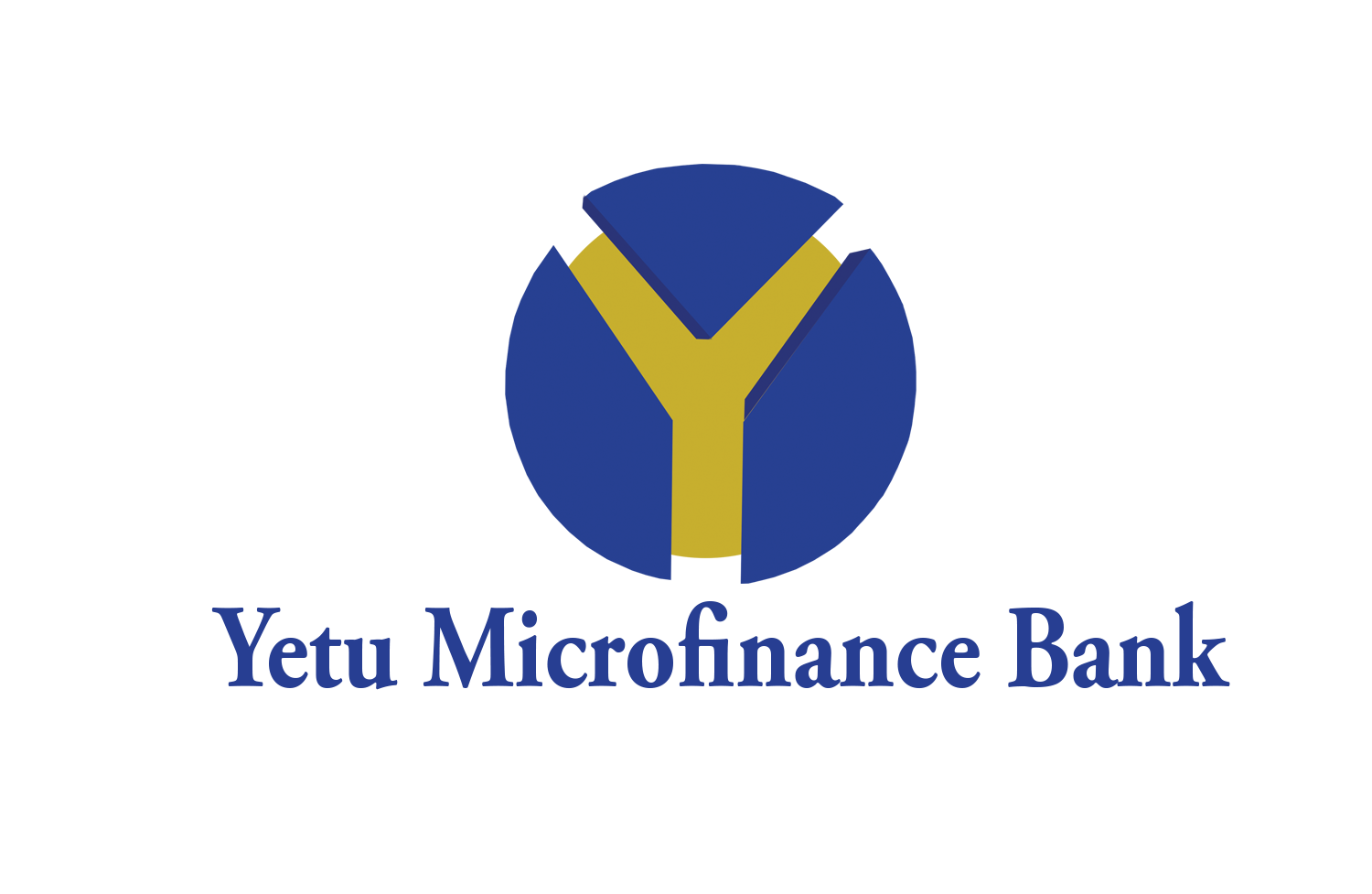
- Company type: Public
- Traded as: DSE: YETU
- Industry: Financial services
- Founded: 1997
- Headquarters: Dar es Salaam, Tanzania
- Key people: Altemius Millinga (managing director & CEO)
- Products: Loans, savings, mobile banking services
- Total assets: TSh 19.57 billion (US$8.4 million) (2019)

Yetu Microfinance Bank Plc. (YETU) is a microfinance bank in Tanzania. It is the first microfinance institution to be listed in the Dar es Salaam Stock Exchange. Yetu is a Swahili word which means "Ours".

== Overview ==
The bank offers credit products, such as solidarity group loans for clients who are organized into groups, whose members serve as informal banks and cross guarantee each other's loans.

Mavuno loans products to members of solidarity group loans who can afford and have reached a loan ceiling of TSh 3 million, and would like to borrow on an individual capacity; small and medium enterprises loan products, including exports and imports, cars, business/shop improvements, business capitals, and processing and manufacturing of loans.

Other loans include SRI agricultural loans, mixed farming loans to smallholder farmers for financing various crops, instant loans, as well as education loans. Its deposit products comprise compulsory (collateral) savings, and voluntary deposits, it's a component company of the Tanzania All Share Index

== History ==
Yetu Microfinance Bank PLC is a public limited company that was incorporated under the Companies Act 2002 on December 23, 2013, to take over the business of Youth Self Employment Foundation (YOSEFO). YOSEFO was a credit-only microfinance institution for 14 years before being transformed into a microfinance bank. On 23 June 2015, Yetu Microfinance launched an initial public offering (IPO) through the Enterprise Growth Window (EGM), and raised TSh 3.1 billion. On 10 March 2016, Yetu Microfinance PLC became the first and only microfinance listed at the Dar es Salaam Stock Exchange PLC. The company managed to secure a banking licence on 20 February 2017 from the Bank of Tanzania, ⁣after meeting licensing conditions including the minimum capital requirement of TSh 5 billion. As of 2018, the current paid up capital of the bank is TSh 6.05 billion.

== Corporate affairs ==
The board of directors of the company comprises six individuals. The chairman is one of the five non-executive directors. The current chairman is Ernest Ndimbo, and the current managing director and chief executive officer (CEO) is Altemius Millinga.

=== Ownership ===
YOSEFO is a major shareholder of YETU Microfinance Bank PLC. YETU Microfinance has taken over from YOSEFO all the branches, agencies, and clients. Yetu Microfinance sold 6,223,380 shares at the price of 500/- and raised 3.1bn/- collected from 14,273 subscribers through an IPO.

== Branches and financial service centre network ==
Yetu Microfinance Bank PLC has its headquarters in Dar es Salaam. As of 2019, the bank's distribution network was three branches (Mzizima and Mbagala in Dar es Salaam and Mngeta in Morogoro region) and 16 financial service centers. All branches and financial service centers are linked on an online real-time basis system. Customers across Tanzania are also served through multiple delivery channels, such as mobile banking, POS and ATMcCards. All the branches and financial service centres are fitted with biometric teller systems, a technology-friendly system to the low-end market of the financial sector. The bank is also a member of Umoja Switch, and hence its customers can access over 300 ATMs country-wide. As of January 2019, Yetu Microfinance Bank PLC maintains a network of branches and financial service centres (FSC) at the following locations:

1. Head office - Dar es Salaam
2. Mbagala Branch - Temeke District, Dar es Salaam
3. Mzizima Branch - Ilala District, Dar es Salaam
4. Mngeta Branch - Kilombero District, Morogoro
5. Zanzibar FSC - Zanzibar
6. Kilwa FSC - Kilwa
7. Lindi FSC - Lindi
8. Lumo FSC - Temeke District, Dar es Salaam
9. Kigamboni FSC - Kigamboni District, Dar es Salaam
10. Kibaha FSC - Kibaha District, Pwani
11. Ifakara FSC - Kilombero District, Morogoro
12. Malinyi FSC - Malinyi District, Morogoro
13. Masasi FSC - Masasi District, Mtwara
14. Ruaha FSC - Kilombero District, Morogoro
15. Amani FSC - Tanga

== See also ==
- Microfinance in Tanzania
- Dar es Salaam Stock Exchange
