= SWIS =

SWIS may refer to

- Shen Wai International School in Shenzhen, China
- South West Interconnected System, the power grid in Western Australia
- See What I'm Saying: The Deaf Entertainers Documentary, a 2009 documentary about four deaf artists
- Swissport Tanzania, an aviation service provider in Tanzania, traded under the code SWIS
