= NMB Bank Tanzania =

Commercial bank in Tanzania

NMB Bank Plc
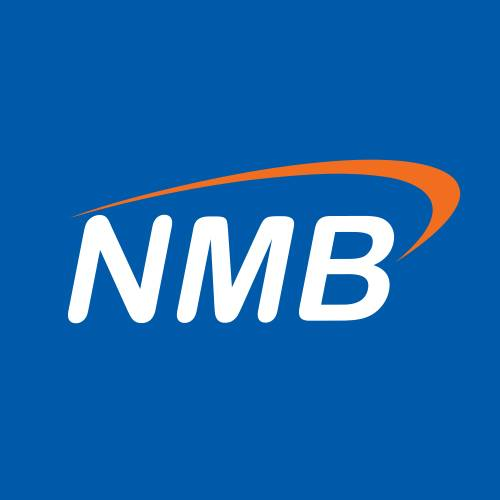

- Company type: Public
- Traded as: DSE: NMB
- Industry: Financial services
- Founded: 1997
- Headquarters: Dar es Salaam, Tanzania
- Key people: David Carol Nchimbi (chairman); Ruth Zaipuna (CEO)
- Products: Loans, savings, transaction accounts, investments, debit cards, credit cards, mortgages
- Revenue: ▲Aftertax: TSh 429 billion (US$172.7 million) (2022)
- Total assets: TSh 10.2 trillion (US$4.106 billion) (2022)
- Number of employees: 3,500+ (2022)
- Website: www.nmbbank.co.tz

NMB Bank Plc. is a commercial bank in Tanzania. It is licensed by the Bank of Tanzania, the central bank and national banking regulator.

== Overview ==
As of 31 December 2022, the bank's total assets were valued at approximately US$4.106 billion (TSh 10.2 trillion), with more than 6 million customer accounts and more than 3,500 employees.

As of September 2023, the bank was a large financial services institution, providing commercial banking services to individuals, small and medium-sized enterprises, corporate clients as well as large businesses. Then, it was the second-largest commercial bank in Tanzania, by assets, behind CRDB Bank Plc. At that time, NMB Bank was ranked as the 3rd most profitable bank in the East African Community, having risen from 10th position in 2018. In 2023 its cost to income ratio was 38 percent.

== History ==
Following the break-up of the old National Bank of Commerce in 1997, by act of Parliament, three new entities were created: NBC Holdings Limited, National Bank of Tanzania (1997) and National Microfinance Bank (NMB). Initially NMB could only offer savings accounts, with limited lending capabilities. In 2005, NMB Bank was privatized and the Government of Tanzania, the sole owner of NMB until then, divested 49 percent shareholding to Rabobank of the Netherlands. Over the years since that time, further divestiture by the Tanzanian Government and subsequent listing of the bank's stock has led to a diversified ownership structure, as outlined under "Ownership". In 2008, the Government of Tanzania off-loaded another 21 percent shareholding in an initial public offering (IPO) at the Dar es Salaam Stock Exchange (DSE).

== Ownership ==
The stock of the bank is listed on the Dar es Salaam Stock Exchange, under the stock symbol NMB. As of September 2023, the company's stock was owned by institutions and private individuals as detailed in the table below:

NMB Bank Plc shareholding structure as at 30 June 2023
S/N	Shareholder	% ownership
1.	Cooperatieve Centrale Raiffeisen-Boerenleenbank B.A. 'Rabobank Nederland'	34.90
2.	The Treasury Registrar of Tanzania	31.78
3.	NICOL Tanzania	6.61
4.	Aunali F Rajabali And Sajjad F Rajabali	5.00
5.	SQM Frontier Africa Master Fund Limited	1.91
6.	Morgan Stanley Galaxy Fund	1.34
7.	Morgan Stanley Institutional Fund Inc.: Frontier Emerging Markets Portfolio	1.24
8.	Patrick Schegg	0.99
9.	Tanzania Parastatal Pension Fund (PPF)	0.97
10.	Pinebridge Sub-Saharan Africa Equity Master Fund	0.77
11.	Kuwait Investment Authority	0.70
12.	Duet Africa Opportunities Master Fund	0.63
13.	TCCIA Investment Company Limited	0.52
14.	Other public and private shareholders	12.64
	Total	100.0

== Branch network ==
As of September 2023, the bank maintained 230 networked brick-and-mortar branches in all regions and provinces of mainland Tanzania and Zanzibar Island.

== Governance ==
David Carol Nchimbi, a non-executive director, is the chairman of the board of directors. Ruth Zaipuna is the chief executive officer. Eleven other senior managers work with her to execute the bank's day-to-day business.

== See also ==
- Tanzania Banks
- National Bank of Commerce (Tanzania)
- Economy of Tanzania
- Microfinance in Tanzania
