= List of cement manufacturers in Zimbabwe =

This is the list of companies that manufacture cement in Zimbabwe.

1. Sino-Zimbabwe Cement Company
2. Lafarge Cement Zimbabwe Limited
3. PPC Zimbabwe Limited
4. Mortal Investments Manufacturing Company
5. Pacstar Cement & Concrete Limited

== Production ==
As of September 2018, Zimbabwe cement manufacturers had installed capacity of approximately 2,000,000 tonnes of cement annually, with the leading two manufacturers, PPC Zimbabwe and Lafarge Cement Zimbabwe Limited being responsible for more than 70 percent of production. In September 2018, Zimbabwe's cement consumption was estimated at 1.3 million tonnes annually.

== Marketsharing ==
The table below illustrates the rankings of Zimbabwe's manufacturers, based on projected annual production figures.

Marketshare Rankings of Zimbabwe's Cement Companies
Rank	Name of Owner	Annual Tonnage	Marketshare
1	PPC Zimbabwe Limited	1.0 million	50.0
2	Lafarge Cement Zimbabwe Limited	0.4 million	20.0
3	Sino-Zimbabwe Cement Company	0.3 million	15.0
4	Mortal Investments Manufacturing Company (Livetouch Cement)	0.2 million	10.0
5	Pacstar Cement & Concrete Limited	0.1 million	5.0
	Total	2.0 million	100.0

== See also ==
- List of cement manufacturers in Rwanda
- List of cement manufacturers in Tanzania
- List of companies and cities in Africa that manufacture cement
