= NSSF =

NSSF may refer to:

- National Shooting Sports Foundation
- National Social Security Fund (disambiguation)
