= Dangote Industries Tanzania Thermal Power Station =

Power station in Tanzania

- Dangote Industries Thermal Power Station
- Country: Tanzania
- Location: Mtwara
- Coordinates: 10°15′33″S 40°02′27″E
- Status: In development
- Commission date: 2018 (Expected)
- Owner: Dangote Industries Limited
- Operator: Dangote Industries Limited

Thermal power station
- Primary fuel: Natural Gas

Power generation
- Nameplate capacity: 45 megawatts (60,000 hp)

Dangote Industries Tanzania Thermal Power Station, is a 45 megawatts (60,000 hp), natural-gas powered thermal power plant in Tanzania, the second-largest economy in the East African Community. Originally, the power station was planned to be a 75 megawatts (101,000 hp), coal-fired power station.

== Location ==
The power plant is located in Mtwara, approximately 565 kilometres (351 mi) by road, south of Dar es Salaam, Tanzania's largest city and commercial capital. The geographical coordinates of the power plant are: 10°15'33.0"S, 40°02'27.0"E (Latitude:-10.259167; Longitude:40.040833).

== Overview ==
The power station is owned and operated by Dangote Industries Tanzania Limited. It is located adjacent to the US$500 million cement factory, owned by the Dangote Group. The power plant supplies electricity to the cement factory as well as the residential and commercial development complex around the factory. As of November 2014, the cement factory was under construction, with commissioning expected in 2015. When fully operational, the factory is expected to produce 3 million tonnes of cement every year. Dangote Cement is the largest manufacturer of cement on the African continent, producing approximately 47 million metric tonnes annually as of November 2014.

== Conversion to natural gas ==
In August 2018, Dangote Industries Tanzania signed a 20-year agreement with the Tanzania Petroleum Development Corporation, for the latter to supply readily available natural gas to this power station, for the purpose of generating electricity to be used in the manufacture of cement. Initially enough gas will be provided to generate 35 megawatts (46,936 hp), to be increased later to 45 megawatts (60,346 hp). It is expected that the conversion will be complete by November 2018.

== See also ==
- Dangote Industries Tanzania
- List of power stations in Tanzania
- List of power stations in Africa
- Economy of Tanzania
