= Swissport Tanzania =

Tanzanian airline

Swissport Tanzania Plc.
- Company type: Public
- Traded as: DSE: SWIS
- Industry: Aviation
- Founded: 1985
- Headquarters: Julius K. Nyerere Road, Julius Nyerere International Airport, Dar es Salaam, Tanzania
- Number of locations: 4 airports
- Area served: Tanzania
- Key people: Shamba Mlanga CEO
- Services: Ground Handling; Cargo Services; Aircraft Maintenance; Aviation Security
- Revenue: ▲TSh 56.8 billion (2015)
- Net income: ▲TSh 18.1 billion (2015)
- Owner: Swissport International
- Number of employees: 994 (2018)
- Website: Company Website

Swissport Tanzania (also known as Swissport Tanzania plc.) is an aviation service provider in Tanzania. The company entered the Tanzanian market in 2001 after the acquisition of Dar es Salaam Airports Handling Company (DAHACO) by the parent company Swissport International. The company currently operates Ground handling, Cargo Handling, Aircraft maintenance and Fueling services at Julius Nyerere International Airport and Kilimanjaro International Airport. The company has also recently expanded its footprint due to the current growth saturation at the major airports into Songwe Airport and Mtwara Airport. The company is a public company and was listed on the Dar Stock Exchange in 2003, it's a component company of the Tanzania All Share Index

== Ownership ==
The company has been listed on the Dar es Salaam Stock Exchange since 2003 and is traded under the symbol: SWIS. A majority 51% share is owned by the parent company Swissport International and the remaining 49% is placed for the public. SWIS stock is owned by institutions and private individuals as detailed in the table below:

Swissport Tanzania Stock Ownership
Rank	Name of Owner	Percentage Ownership
1	Swissport International Ltd	51
2	Other Investors on DSE	25
3	ACC Barca Global Master Fund	7
4	National Social Security Fund	5
5	Public Service Pensions Fund	4
6	Parastatal Pensions Fund	3
7	Sayeed H. Kadri&/or Basharati Kadri	1
8	Standard Chartered Bank	1
9	A/C Frontier Market Select Fund II L.P	1
10	G.A.K. Patel & Co. Limited	1
11	Social Action Trust Fund	~1

== Airport Network ==
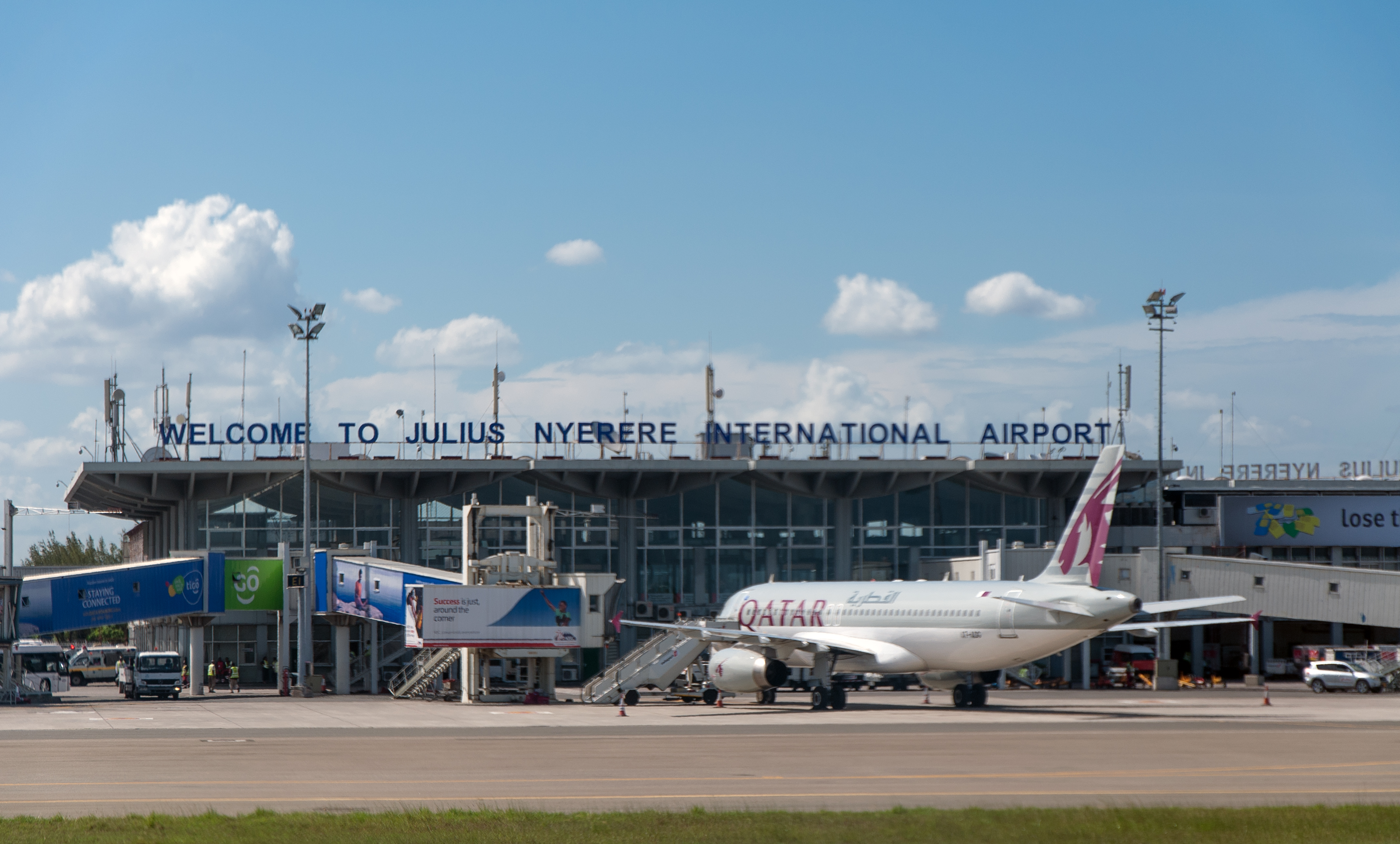
Qatar Airways at JNIA

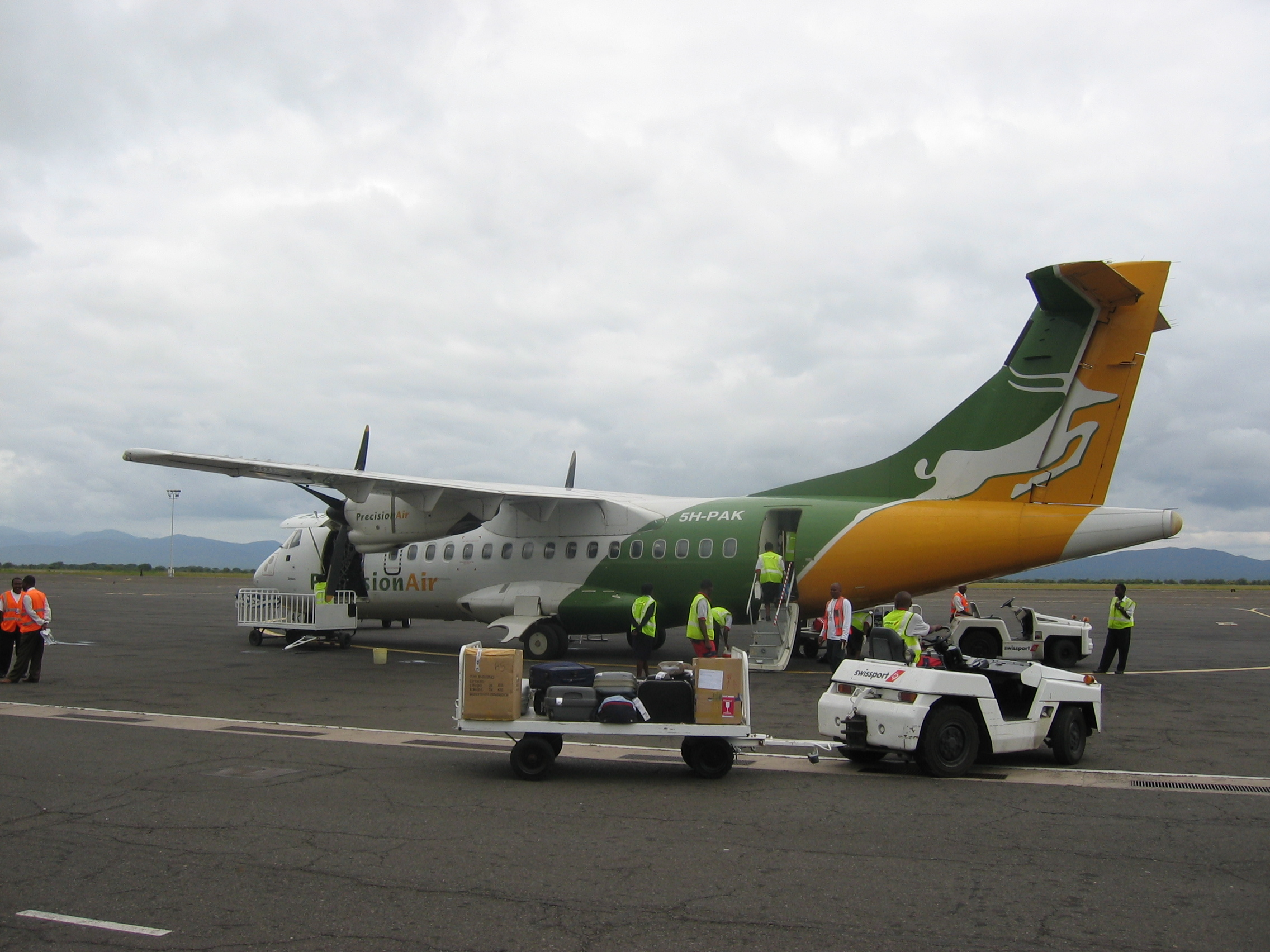
Baggage Services at Kilimanjaro International Airport

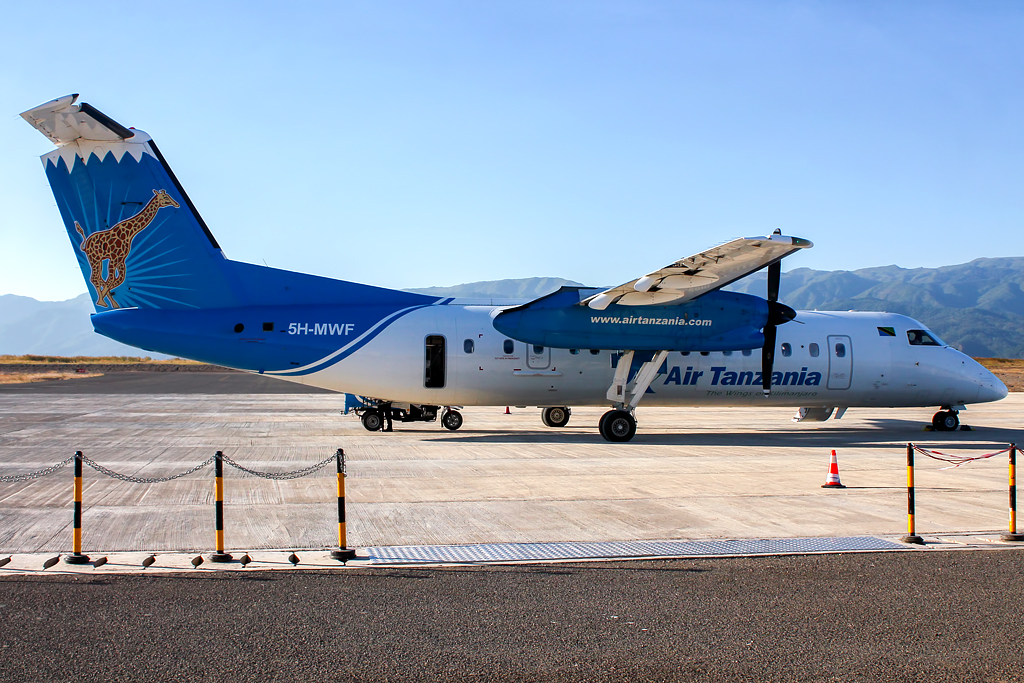
Air Tanzania Parked at Songwe Airport

=== Julius Nyerere International Airport ===
Julius Nyerere International Airport is the largest airport managed by Swissport Tanzania. Originally ground handling services at the airport were managed by Dar es Salaam Airports Handling Company (DAHACO) a majority government owned company since 1985. In 2000 the company was privatized and Swissport International acquired 51% stake making its entry into the country. The company operates both ground handling and cargo handling at the airport and in 2014 the airport brought in around 80% of the company's revenue. The company also has a licence to provide Aircraft maintenance and re-fueling services, however has yet to serve any airline with those services. The company has been the sole operator of ground handling services at the airport however after 2014 the government liberalized the industry and began to issue licences to various companies.

=== Kilimanjaro International Airport ===
DAHACO began Kilimanjaro International Airport ground handling services in 1990 and was the first expansion project from Dar-es-Salaam International Airport. The acquisition of DAHCO in 2000 added the airport to the company's portfolio. Swissport provides both ground handling and cargo services at the airport and is the only airport in the network that is facing declining revenue. Swissport maintains a branch office in Arusha and operations for Kilimanjaro Airport Development Company are handled from the arusha branch.

=== Songwe Airport ===
Songwe airport began operations in 2012 and Swissport expanded its presence to the airport in October 2013. Currently the airport is only served by Fastjet Tanzania and is swissports sole customer at the airport. The airport is destined to become a major cargo hub in the southern region of the country and swissport eyes on capturing the cargo market in the future.

=== Mtwara Airport ===
Due to the slow growth at Dar-es-salaam and Kilimanjaro airports Swissport expanded into Mtwara airport. The airport was added to the Swissport Portfolio at the same time as Songwe Airport. With the increasing presence of companies in the south due to Oil and gas exploration, Swissport plans to capitalize on the growing demand for passengers and cargo into the region.

== See also ==
- Tanzania Airports Authority
- List of airports in Tanzania
