= Tanzania Tea Packers =

Tanzanian tea producer and exporter

Tanzania Tea Packers.
- Headquarters: Tanzania
- Revenue: TSh
- Net income: TSh

Tanzania Tea Packers, also known as Tatepa Limited, is a company based in Mbeya, Tanzania, which grows and exports tea products, as well as other produce including fruits.

The company is listed on the Dar es Salaam Stock Exchange, it's a component company of the Tanzania All Share Index
