= Climate change in Tanzania =

Emissions, impacts and responses of Tanzania related to climate change

Köppen climate classification map for Tanzania for 1980–2016

2071–2100 map under the most intense climate change scenario. Mid-range scenarios are currently considered more likely.

Climate change in Tanzania is affecting the natural environment and residents of Tanzania. Temperatures in Tanzania are rising with a higher likelihood of intense rainfall events (resulting in flooding) and of dry spells (resulting in droughts).

Water scarcity has become an increasing problem and many major water bodies have had extreme drops in water levels, including Lake Victoria, Lake Tanganyika, Lake Jipe, and Lake Rukwa. Tanzania's agricultural sector, which employs over half of the population, is particularly vulnerable as farmers are predominantly dependent on rainfed agriculture. On the other hand, increasing intense rainfall events have resulted in flooding across the region, which has damaged infrastructure and livelihoods. A high percentage of the population of Tanzania lives along the coast and are dependent on fisheries and Aquaculture Sea level rise and changes in the quality of water are expected to impact these sectors and be a continued challenge for the country.

Tanzania produced a National Adaptation Programmes of Action (NAPAs) in 2007 as mandated by the United Nations Framework Convention on Climate Change. The NAPA identifies the sectors of agriculture, water, health, and energy as Tanzania's most vulnerable sectors to climate change. In 2012, Tanzania produced a National Climate Change Strategy in response to the growing concern of the negative impact of climate change and climate variability on the country's social, economic and physical environment. In 2015, Tanzania submitted its Intended Nationally Determined Contributions (INDC).

== Impacts on the natural environment ==
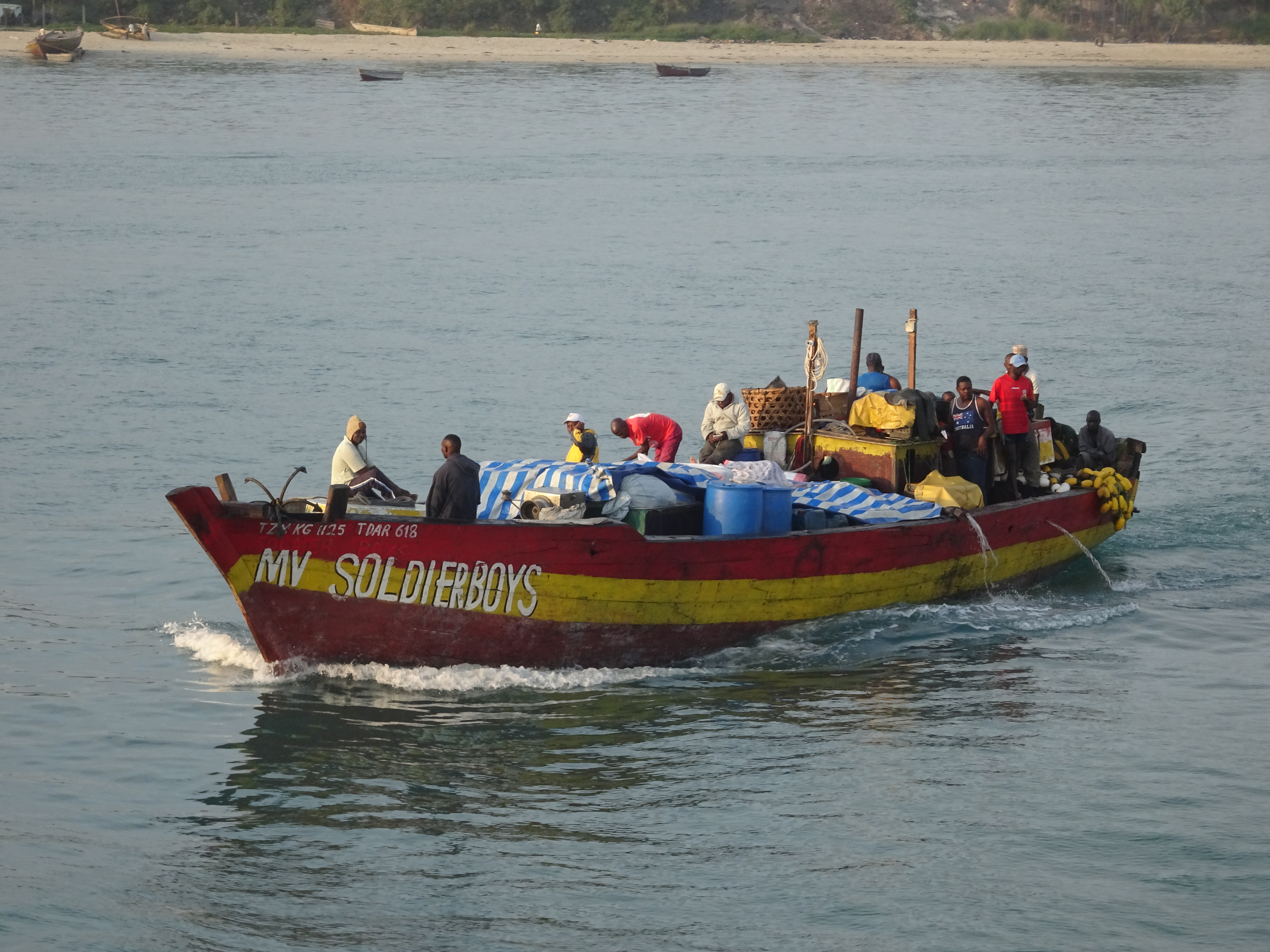
Fishing boat off Dar es Salaam - fishing will be affected by changes to ecosystems due to climate change.

Between 1981 and 2016 there are marked areas of drying in parts of northeast and much of southern Tanzania. In contrast, moderate wetting trends occurred in central Tanzania and stronger wetting trends in the northwest of the country. A clear warming trend is apparent in annual temperature. By 2050s, Tanzania's average annual temperatures could rise 1 to 3 °C above baseline. By the 2090s projected warming is in the range of 1.6 to 5.0 °C, also evenly distributed across the country. For rainfall there is strong agreement for decreases in the mean number of rain days and increases in the amount of rainfall on each rainy day (the 'rainfall intensity'). Taken together these changes suggest more variable rainfall, with both higher likelihood of dry spells (such as droughts) and a higher likelihood of intense rainfall events (often associated with flooding). Climate change impacts of severe droughts, floods, livestock deaths, crop failures and outbreak of disease (such as cholera and malaria) are likely to be regularly observed.

== Impacts on people ==
=== Economic impacts ===
==== Agriculture ====
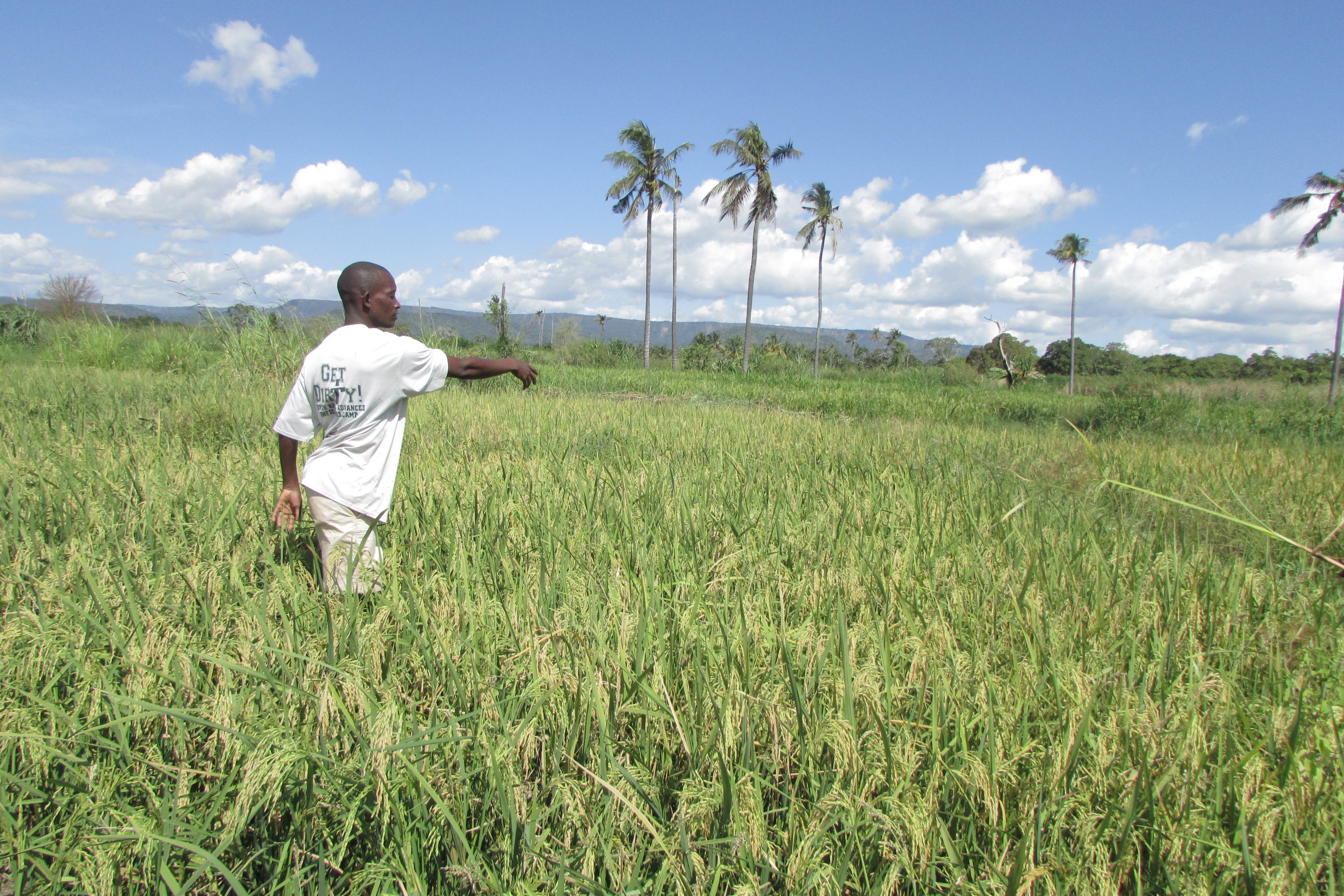
Tanzanian rice farmer - agricultural activities will be affected by climate change.

Agriculture (including livestock) is the dominant sector in the Tanzanian economy, providing livelihood, income and employment. It is also identified as the sector most vulnerable to climate change. An increase in temperature by 2 °C - 4 °C is likely to alter the distribution of Tanzania's seven agro-ecological zones. Areas that used to grow perennial crops would be suitable for annual crops. Climate change would tend to accelerate plant growth and reduce the length of growing seasons. Vulnerability in the agricultural sector is likely to include decreased crop production of different crops exacerbated by climatic variability and unpredictability of seasonality, erosion of natural resource base and environmental degradation.

A 2011 study found that crop yields are both affected by heating and increased variability. An increase in temperature by 2 °C during the growing season as projected by 2050 will likely reduce yields of rice, sorghum and maize by 7.6%, 8.8% and 13% respectively in Tanzania. A 20% increase in precipitation variability between seasons was found to decrease yields of rice, sorghum and maize by 7.6%, 7.2% and 4.2% respectively by 2050. For example, a severe drought in Dodoma resulted in an 80% decrease in harvest.

=== Health impacts ===
There are a number of climate-sensitive diseases in Tanzania that may become more prevalent during drought and flooding. Water related diseases such as cholera and malaria may increase in Tanzania due to climate change.

In parts of Tanzania, cholera outbreaks have been linked with increased rainfall. Cholera outbreaks in North East, South East, Lake Victoria basin and coastal areas of Tanzania were due to high rainfall. Research has also shown that initial risk of cholera increased by 15% to 19% for every 1 °C temperature increase. It was further projected that in 2030 the total costs of cholera attributable to climate change variability will be in the range of 0.32% to 1.4% of national GDP for Tanzania.

The incidence of malaria are known to be highest during heavy rainfall and high temperatures as it makes mosquitoes' habitats (such as ponds, pools, wells or bores, streams, rivers and canals) suitable breeding sites. For example, a study conducted in Lushoto district, Tanzania, reported that malaria cases were prominent during high rainfall seasons and there was a link to an increase in temperatures.

== Climate finance in Tanzania ==
Tanzania ratified the Paris Agreement in 2018, thereby affirming its dedication to global initiatives aimed at combating climate change. Through the implementation of its Nationally Determined Contributions (NDCs), the country seeks to reduce greenhouse gas emissions and enhance its resilience to climate-related risks. Climate finance is a critical component in facilitating the realization of these objectives. In Tanzania, a developing nation with a largely agrarian economy, the impacts of climate change have become increasingly pronounced. The country faces rising temperatures, erratic rainfall patterns, and increased frequency of extreme weather events, all of which threaten livelihoods, food security, and economic stability.

In 2012, Tanzania produced a National Climate Change Strategy in response to the growing concern of the negative impacts of climate change and climate variability on the country's social, economic and physical environment. In 2015, Tanzania submitted its Intended Nationally Determined Contributions (INDC).

=== Sources of climate finance in Tanzania ===
Tanzania accesses climate finance from various sources, including international funds, bilateral and multilateral donors, and private sector investments. These resources are directed toward both adaptation and mitigation projects across different sectors. International Climate Funds including Green Climate Fund (GCF): Tanzania has benefited from the GCF, a financial mechanism under the United Nations Framework Convention on Climate Change (UNFCCC), which supports projects that build climate resilience and reduce emissions. Notable projects funded by the GCF in Tanzania include climate-resilient agriculture and renewable energy initiatives

Global Environment Facility (GEF): Tanzania has also received support from the GEF to enhance its capacity to adapt to climate impacts, particularly through biodiversity conservation and sustainable land management. Adaptation Fund (AF): Tanzania is a beneficiary of the Adaptation Fund, which focuses on projects that help vulnerable communities adapt to climate change impacts. Bilateral and Multilateral Donors such as the World Bank supports climate-related projects in Tanzania, such as the Tanzania Climate Action Project, which enhances the country's ability to manage natural resources and increase climate resilience in agriculture. European Union (EU) has provided financial and technical assistance to Tanzania for climate-smart agriculture and sustainable forest management initiatives. Other Bilateral Partners: Countries like Germany, Norway, and the United Kingdom have also contributed through various climate programs that support Tanzania's adaptation and mitigation efforts.

Private Sector and Carbon Markets: The private sector in Tanzania is increasingly involved in renewable energy and clean technology investments, particularly in the development of solar, wind, and hydropower projects. Tanzania has engaged in carbon trading initiatives, including REDD+ (Reducing Emissions from Deforestation and Forest Degradation), which allows the country to receive financial compensation for forest conservation efforts that contribute to reducing carbon emissions.

=== Key climate finance projects in Tanzania ===
Sustainable land management and climate-resilient agriculture: Tanzania has implemented several projects aimed at promoting climate-resilient agricultural practices. These initiatives are designed to enhance food security, improve water management, and reduce the vulnerability of farmers to climate change impacts. Climate finance from the GCF and the World Bank has been instrumental in supporting these efforts.

Renewable energy development: The expansion of renewable energy in Tanzania is a key priority to meet the country's growing energy needs while reducing greenhouse gas emissions. Climate finance has facilitated the development of solar, wind, and mini-hydropower projects that provide clean and affordable energy, particularly to rural areas.

Forest conservation and REDD+: Tanzania is one of the pioneering countries in the implementation of REDD+, a global initiative aimed at reducing emissions from deforestation and forest degradation. Through REDD+ projects, Tanzania has received financial resources for forest conservation, sustainable forest management, and community-based initiatives that provide alternative livelihoods for people living in forested areas

=== Policies and legislation for adaptation ===
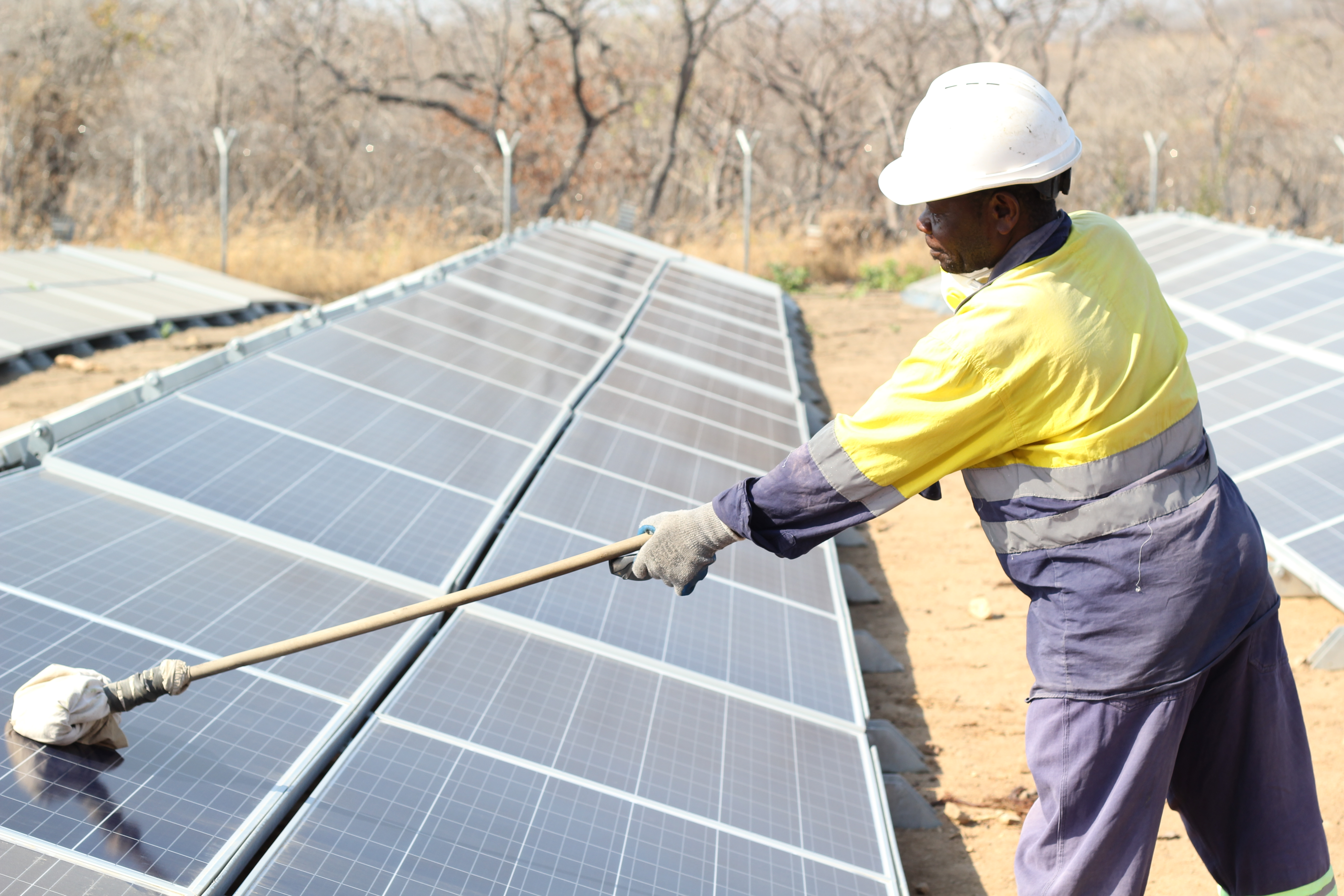
Cleaning solar panels

Tanzania produced a National Adaptation Programmes of Action (NAPAs) in 2007 as mandated by the United Nations Framework Convention on Climate Change. The overall vision of Tanzania's NAPA is to identify immediate and urgent climate change adaptation actions that are robust enough to lead to long-term sustainable development in a changing climate. The NAPA identifies the sectors of agriculture, water, health, and energy as Tanzania's most vulnerable sectors to climate change. Dissemination and expansion of low-cost, readily available technology such as fuel wood-burning stoves, as well as continued investment in alternative energy sources such as wind and solar.

Tanzania has outlined priority adaptation measures in their NAPA, and various national sector strategies and research outputs. The NAPA has been successful at encouraging climate change mainstreaming into sector policies in Tanzania; however, the cross-sectoral collaboration crucial to implementing adaptation strategies remains limited due to institutional challenges such as power imbalances, budget constraints and an ingrained sectoral approach. Most of the projects in Tanzania concern agriculture and water resource management (irrigation, water saving, rainwater collection); however, energy and tourism also play an important role.

== See also ==
- Climate change in Africa
