= Mkombozi Commercial Bank =

Tanzanian banking and financial service corporation

- Type: Private
- Traded as: DSE: MKCB
- Industry: Financial services
- Founded: 2009
- Headquarters: Dar es Salaam, Tanzania
- Key people: Gasper Njuu; Chairman; Respige Kimati; Managing Director
- Products: Loans, Checking, Savings, Investments, Debit Cards
- Revenue: ▲Aftertax: TSh 806 million (US$346,800+ (2018)
- Total assets: TSh 178.82 billion (US$76.94 million) (2018)
- Website: www.mkombozibank.co.tz

Mkombozi Commercial Bank Plc. is a commercial bank in Tanzania. It is licensed by Bank of Tanzania, the central bank and national banking regulator. Mkombozi is a Swahili word meaning Savior

== Overview ==
The bank is a small commercial bank that focuses on serving the lower social economic classes in Tanzania, along with their small-to-medium enterprises (SMEs). As of December 2018, the bank's total asset valuation was approximately TSh 178.82 billion (US$76.94 million), with shareholder's equity of approximately TSh 23.3 billion (US$10.02 million). The bank made a profit of TSh 806 million (US$346,835), in calendar year 2013. it's a component company of the Tanzania All Share Index

== History ==
Mkombozi Commercial Bank obtained a commercial banking licence from the Bank of Tanzania, the national banking regulator, in July 2009, and opened for business in August 2009.

== Ownership ==
Mkombozi Commercial Bank is owned by Tanzanian Catholic dioceses, parishes, and individuals of all religious persuasions. In order to raise the TSh 7.8 billion (US$5 million) initial share capital, shares were sold to individuals and businesses, in batches of 100 shares at US$0.75 per share. In November 2014, the bank floated its shares of the Dar es Salaam Stock Exchange (DSE), with three main objectives: (a) to raise paid-up capital, above the new statutory minimum of TSh15 billion (US$9 million), before 1 March 2015 (b) to raise funds for expanded lending and (c) to source funding for opening more branches.

== Branch Network ==
As of December 2019, Mkombozi Commercial Bank maintains branches at the following locations:

1. Main Branch - St Joseph's Catholic Church, 40 Mansfield Street, Dar es Salaam
2. Mwanza Branch - Mwanza
3. Msimbazi Branch - Msimbazi, Ilala District, Dar es Salaam
4. Kariakoo Branch - Kariakoo, Dar es Salaam.
5. Moshi Branch - Moshi Town, Kilimanjaro
6. Bukoba Branch - Bukoba Town, Kagera
7. Morogoro Branch - Morogoro Town, Morogoro
8. Tegeta Branch - Tegeta, Dar es Salaam
9. Dodoma Branch - Dodoma City, Dodoma
10. Iringa Branch - Iringa Town, Iringa
11. Njombe Branch - Njombe Town, Njombe.

== Governance ==
The Board of Directors of the bank comprises eight individuals. The Chairman is one of the seven non-Executive Directors. The current Chairperson is Gasper C. Njuu. The current Managing Director is Respige Kimati.

== See also ==
- List of banks in Tanzania
- List of banks in Africa
- Bank of Tanzania
- Economy of Tanzania
