= Mafuta House =

- Head office of the NSSF

- Location within Tanzania
- Former names: Mafuta House

General information
- Location: Kivukoni, Dar es Salaam, Plot no 750, Block No 10, Azikiwe Street, Tanzania
- Coordinates: 6.8151°S 39.2880°E
- Cost: US$ 63 million

Technical details
- Floor count: 21

Benjamin William Mkapa Pension Tower, formerly known as Mafuta House, is one of the tallest buildings in Dar es Salaam, Tanzania. It is a multi-million U.S. Dollar building owned by the National Social Security Fund (NSSF) that will be used for retail and commercial space.

After a 5-year halt due to lack of funds by its previous owners, Tanzania Petroleum Development Corporation (TPDC) and the National Housing Corporation (NHC), its construction resumed in late 2004 when NSSF purchased the unfinished building and continued the construction.

== See also ==
- National Social Security Fund (Tanzania)
- List of tallest buildings in Tanzania
