= Amsons Group =

Industrial conglomerate in Tanzania

- Company type: Private conglomerate
- Industry: Investments
- Founded: 2000; 26 years ago
- Headquarters: Dar es Salaam, Tanzania
- Key people: Edha Nahdi; Group CEO
- Products: Cement, construction, transport, flour, logistics
- Number of employees: 10,000+ (2024)
- Website: Homepage

The Amsons Group of Companies, commonly referred to as the Amsons Group, is a privately owned conglomerate in Tanzania. Established in 2000, the conglomerate is involved in the manufacture and distribution of cement and concrete, construction, transport, flour, logistics, among other activities.

== Overview ==
The Amsons Group is a large industrial conglomerate that is headquartered in Tanzania and is active in the African Great Lakes Region countries of Burundi, Democratic Republic of the Congo, Malawi, Tanzania and Zambia. The group employs over 10,000 people, of whom 1,700 are directly employed in Tanzania.

== Subsidiary companies ==
As of November 2024, the companies of the Amsons Group included but were not limited to the following:

- Camel Oil (5.8% national market share in 2018)
- Camel Gas
- Camel Cement Company Limited
- Camel Concrete
- Camel Oil Lubricants
- Farion Trading Limited
- EAW (Heavy Duty Commercial Transporter)
- Amsons Real Estates
- Camel Flour Mills
- Tanzania Clou Electronic Company Limited (CLOU)
- Mbeya Cement

== Corporate social responsibility ==
Since 2018, Amsons Group has constructed modern women's wards at Amana Regional Referral Hospital, Temeke Hospital and Mwananyamala Regional Referral Hospital as part of the group's corporate social responsibility (CSR).

== Developments ==
In July 2024, Amsons Group made an offer of TSh475 billion (US$180 million) to acquire all the shareholding in Bamburi Cement in neighboring Kenya. The transaction is subject to regulatory approval in Kenya.

== See also ==
- List of conglomerates in Africa
- List of cement manufacturers in Tanzania
