= Tanzania Mercantile Exchange =

Commodity exchange in Tanzania

- Type: Commodities exchange
- Location: Dar es salaam, Tanzania
- Founded: August 25, 2014
- Owner: Government of Tanzania (49%); Private investors (51%)
- Currency: Tanzanian shilling
- Website: tmx.co.tz

Tanzania Mercantile Exchange is a commodity exchange in Tanzania. The commodities exchange is put in place to help various farmers access the domestic and global market better and obtain a fair price in selling of their produce. The exchange is currently undergoing training of their staff and has begun pilot trading in Sesame Seeds and Green Grams. The exchange plans to trade in coffee, cashew nuts, sesame, rice, sunflowers and maize, which are all currently traded under the warehouse receipt system. The Capital Market and Securities Authority (CMSA) currently oversees the operations of the exchange and is in the process of educating farmers to use the system, however, many farmers are skeptical to the system.

The exchange is supposed to be electronic based and floor based, however, the exchange has opted to begin with a floor based trading system to gain the trust of the small farmers. Many farmers, especially coffee farmers are used to the electronic auction system at the Moshi Coffee Exchange. The TMX and the Coffee board of Tanzania is looking integrate their platforms to create a single window system.

== History ==
The exchange was the idea of President Jakaya Kikwete, who wanted to emulate a similar model in Tanzania after visiting the Ethiopia Commodity Exchange. The exchange was licensed by the Capital Market and Securities authority of Tanzania and incorporated on 25 August 2014. The Exchange was inaugurated in November 2015 by Jakaya Kikwete and commenced operations in Sesame seeds in 2019. By 2021, around 100 billion TZS worth of commodities had been traded through the exchange.

== Corporate affairs ==
=== Ownership ===
The exchange is established under a private-public partnership with the Government of Tanzania regulated by the Capital Markets and Securities Authority. The company has an authorized share capital of TSh.50 billion/= and is divided between four investors. The public sector owns 49% of the share capital and the private sector owns 51%. The first four shareholders are the Treasury Registrar, TIB Development Bank, Public Service Pension Fund (PSPF) and the Tanzanian Federation of Cooperatives (TFC).

== Operations ==
=== Commodities Traded ===
As of December 2020, the following commodities are traded on the exchange.

TMX Code	Commodity	Commenced Trading	Warehouse Regions
SS	Sesame Seeds	29 May 2019	Dodoma, Katavi, Pwani, Singida, Manyara, Mtwara
GG	Green Grams	25 March 2020	Mwanza, Singida, Tabora
CP	Chickpea	11 September 2020	Shinyanga
RCN	Raw Cashew Nut	9 October 2020	Lindi, Ruvuma, Pwani, Mtwara

== See also ==
- Dar es Salaam Stock Exchange
- Agriculture in Tanzania
