= Dar es Salaam Community Bank =

Commercial bank in Tanzania

- Company type: Public
- Traded as: DSE: DCB
- Industry: Financial services
- Founded: 2001
- Headquarters: Dar es Salaam, Tanzania
- Key people: Paul Milyango Rupia (Chairman), Edmund Pancras Mkwawa (Managing Director)
- Products: Loans, Transaction accounts, Savings, Investments, Debit Cards
- Revenue: ▲ Aftertax: TSh 3.7 billion (US$2.2 million (2013)
- Total assets: TSh 143.97 billion (US$85.7 million) (2013)
- Website: www.dcb.co.tz

Dar es Salaam Community Bank (DCB), whose official name is DCB Commercial Bank, but is commonly called DCB Bank, is a commercial bank in Tanzania. It is licensed by the Bank of Tanzania, the central bank and national banking regulator.

DCB is a private, publicly traded, microfinance bank, initially established to serve the banking needs of the poorest of the poor in the city of Dar-es-Salaam and its suburbs. In 2012, DCB was issued a national banking license, to extends its services nationwide. The stock of the bank is listed on the Dar es Salaam Stock Exchange.

As of December 2013, the total asset base of DCB was valued at approximately TSh 143.97 billion (US$85.7 million). At that time, the bank's shareholders' equity was valued at about TSh 31.98 billion (US$19 million) Customer deposits at 31 December 2013 totalled TSh 80.3 billion (approximately US$47.8 million). it's a component company of the Tanzania All Share Index

== History ==
Dar es Salaam Community Bank was incorporated in September 2001. In October 2001, DCB received a provisional banking licence from the Bank of Tanzania, the national banking regulator. DCB commenced commercial banking services in April 2002. In 2003, the Bank of Tanzania issued DCB with an unrestricted banking license as a regional unit bank, whose services are restricted to serving the Dar es Salaam area only. In 2008, the stock of DCB was floated on the Dar es Salaam Stock Exchange through the issuance of an initial public offering. In April 2012, the bank received a national commercial banking license, authorising DCB to expand its operations nationwide. The bank rebranded as DCB Commercial Bank and began to open branches outside Dar es Salaam.

== Ownership ==
The shares of the bank's stock is listed on the Dar es Salaam Stock Exchange, where it trades under the symbol DCB. The bank's stock is owned by the following corporate entities and individuals:

Dar es Salaam Community Bank Stock Ownership
Rank	Name of Owner	Percentage Ownership
1	Dar es Salaam City Council	8.86
2	Ilala Municipal Council	8.25
3	Kinondoni Municipal Council	8.11
4	Temeke Municipal Council	7.40
5	Unit Trust of Tanzania	9.05
6	Private Individuals and Corporations	58.33
	Total	100.00

== Branch Network ==
As of November 2014, DCB maintains branches at the following locations:

1. Main Branch – DCB House, Magomeni Mwembechai, Morogoro Road, Dar es Salaam
2. Arnautoglu Branch – Arnautoglu Building, Mnazi Mmoja, Bibi Titi Road, Dar-es-Salaam
3. Magomeni Branch – DCB House, Magomeni Mwembechai, Morogoro Road, Dar es Salaam
4. Temeke Branch – Junction of Temeke Road & Evereth Road, Dar es Salaam
5. Tabata Branch – Tabata Old Dampo Area, Dar es Salaam
6. Mabibo External Branch – Garage Area, Mandela Road, Dar es Salaam
7. Ukonga Branch – Aviation House, Banana Area, Nyerere Road at Kitunda Road, Dar es Salaam
8. Chanika Branch – Chanika Road, Dar es Salaam

== Governance ==
The bank's activities are directed by an eight-person board of directors. Paul Milyango Rupia, one of the non-executive directors is the chairman. Edmund Pancras Mkwawa, serves as the managing director.

== See also ==
- List of banks in Tanzania
- List of banks in Africa
- Bank of Tanzania
- Economy of Tanzania
