= Tanga Cement =

Tanzanian cement manufacturer

Coordinates: 06°45′42″S 39°16′54.5″E

Tanga Cement Plc
- Type: Public
- Traded as: DSE: TCCL
- Industry: Cement manufacturing
- Founded: 1970 plans 1980 commissioned
- Headquarters: Pongwe Factory Area, Korogwe Road, P.O. Box 5053, Tanga, Tanzania
- Key people: Lawrence Masha (chairman); Reinhart Swart (managing director)
- Products: Simba Bora, Simba Imara, Simba Barabara
- Total assets: TSh 435.94 billion (H1:2019)
- Number of employees: 300 +
- Website: Company website

Tanga Cement Public Limited Company is a cement manufacturing company in Tanzania. Its shares are publicly listed on the Dar es Salaam Stock Exchange, where they trade under the symbol TCCL.

== Location ==
The company maintains corporate offices at Coco Plaza, 254 Toure Drive, Oysterbay, in Dar es Salaam, the commercial and financial capital of Tanzania. The company's production facilities are located at Pongwe Factory Area, along the Tanga–Korogwe Road, in Pongwe, a western suburb of the city of Tanga, along the Indian Ocean coast, approximately 331 kilometres (206 mi) north of Dar es Salaam.

== Overview ==
Tanga Cement Plc is a large cement manufacturer, whose annual production capacity is over 1.25 million tonnes. As of 30 June 2019, the company had total assets of TSh 435.94 billion (approx. US$191 million), with shareholders' equity of TSh 140.85 billion (approx. US$62 million). Tanga Cement Plc produces Simba branded portland cement grades of Type II 32.5R and Type II 42.5R. it's a component company of the Tanzania All Share Index

== History ==
The company was founded in 1980 by the Tanzanian government. It was inaugurated by Tanzania's founder-president, Julius Nyerere in 1981. In 1989, the parastatal, then known as Tanga Cement Company Limited, entered into a management contract with Holcim Cement of Switzerland. In 1996, the government of Tanzania sold 60 percent shareholding in the company to Holcim Cement, the management company of the business.

In 2002, the company's shares of stock were listed on the Dar es Salaam Stock Exchange. The government of Tanzania divested from the business and Holcim increased their ownership to 62.5 percent. Holcim went through several name changes, including Holcim Mauritius and eventually AfriSam Mauritius.

== Ownership ==
Tanga Cement Plc's stock is listed on the Dar es Salaam Stock Exchange; its symbol is TCCL. The table below illustrates the shareholding in the stock of the company, as at 31 December 2016.

Tanga Cement Plc stock ownership
Rank	Name of owner	Percentage ownership
1	AfriSam Mauritius	68.3
2	Private and institutional investors	31.7
	Total	100.00

== See also ==
- Cement in Africa
- Twiga Cement
- Dangote Industries Tanzania
- Nyati Cement
