= Agriculture in Tanzania =

A map showing the eleven agriculture crop distribution in Tanzania.

Agriculture is the main part of Tanzania's economy. As of 2016, Tanzania had over 44 million hectares of arable land with only 33 percent of this amount in cultivation. Almost 70 percent of the rich population live in rural areas, and almost all of them are involved in the farming sector. Land is a vital asset in ensuring food security, and among the nine main food crops in Tanzania are maize, sorghum, millet, rice, wheat, beans, cassava, potatoes, and bananas. The agricultural industry makes a large contribution to the country's foreign exchange earnings, with more than US$1 billion in earnings from cash crop exports.

The 6 main cash crops are cashew nuts, coffee, cotton, sisal, tea and tobacco. At one point in its agricultural history, Tanzania was the largest producer of sisal in the world.

The agriculture sector faces various challenges and had been the governments top priority to develop to reduce poverty and increase productivity. Farming efficiently has been a challenge for many farmers, and lack of finances and farming education has caused many to remain subsistence farmers. Farm sizes remain very small with an average plot size being around 2.5 ha.

Challenges on the agriculture industry of Tanzania include climate change and the resulting droughts, floods, and agriculture temperature shocks and a lack of agricultural technology. These pose severe challenges to the living standards of most of people involved in the agriculture industry in Tanzania and create huge increases in unemployment, hunger, malnutrition and starvation, and diseases rates.

Large declines in commodity prices, decreased export revenues, increased trade and budget deficits all amount to hindering the growth of the country's gross domestic product (GDP). The Agriculture Industry in Tanzania represents 32.4 percent of GDP of Tanzania.

== Soil and topography ==
Tanzania has an area of 945,000 square kilometres (365,000 sq mi) with inland lakes covering 6 percent of that (59,000 square kilometres (23,000 sq mi)). The Great Rift Valley runs north to south and contains most of the country's lakes. The country is home to the highest point in Africa, Mount Kilimanjaro, and the lowest point in the continent, Lake Tanganyika.

Soil types vary drastically throughout the country. There are six main types of soil types in the country as follows;

1. Volcanic soils: predominantly in the northern highland regions.
2. Sandy soils: predominantly in the coastal regions and used mainly for grazing.
3. Granite/Gneiss soil: predominantly in the northern regions of Mwanza and Tabora.
4. Red soils: predominantly in the central plateau, including the Dodoma Region.
5. Ironstone soils: predominantly in the western regions like Kagera and Kigoma.
6. Vertisol: called mbuga black soil, spread across most of the country.

In summary for the variety of soil types studies still do not indicate which type of soil suits best for farming of a cash crop or a food crop.

== Production ==
Tanzania produced in 2018:

1. 5.9 million tons of maize;
2. 5 million tons of cassava (12th largest producer in the world);
3. 3.8 million tons of sweet potato (4th largest producer in the world, second only to China, Malawi and Nigeria);
4. 3.4 million tons of banana (10th largest producer in the world, 13th adding plantain production);
5. 3 million tons of rice;
6. 3 million tons of sugarcane;
7. 1.7 million tons of potato;
8. 1.2 million tons of beans (6th largest producer in the world);
9. 940 thousand tons of peanut (7th largest producer in the world);
10. 930 thousand tons of sunflower seed (12th largest producer in the world);
11. 808 thousand tons of sorghum;
12. 561 thousand tons of sesame seed (5th largest producer in the world, losing only to Sudan, Myanmar, India and Nigeria);
13. 546 thousand tons of coconut (11th largest producer in the world);
14. 454 thousand tons of mango (including mangosteen and guava);
15. 389 thousand tons of pineapple;
16. 373 thousand tons of orange;
17. 356 thousand tons of tomato;
18. 238 thousand tons of cotton;
19. 171 thousand tons of cashew nuts (6th largest producer in the world);

In addition to smaller productions of other agricultural products, like tobacco (107 thousand tons, 8th largest producer in the world), coffee (55 thousand tons), tea (36 thousand tons) and sisal (33 thousand tons).

== Cash crops ==
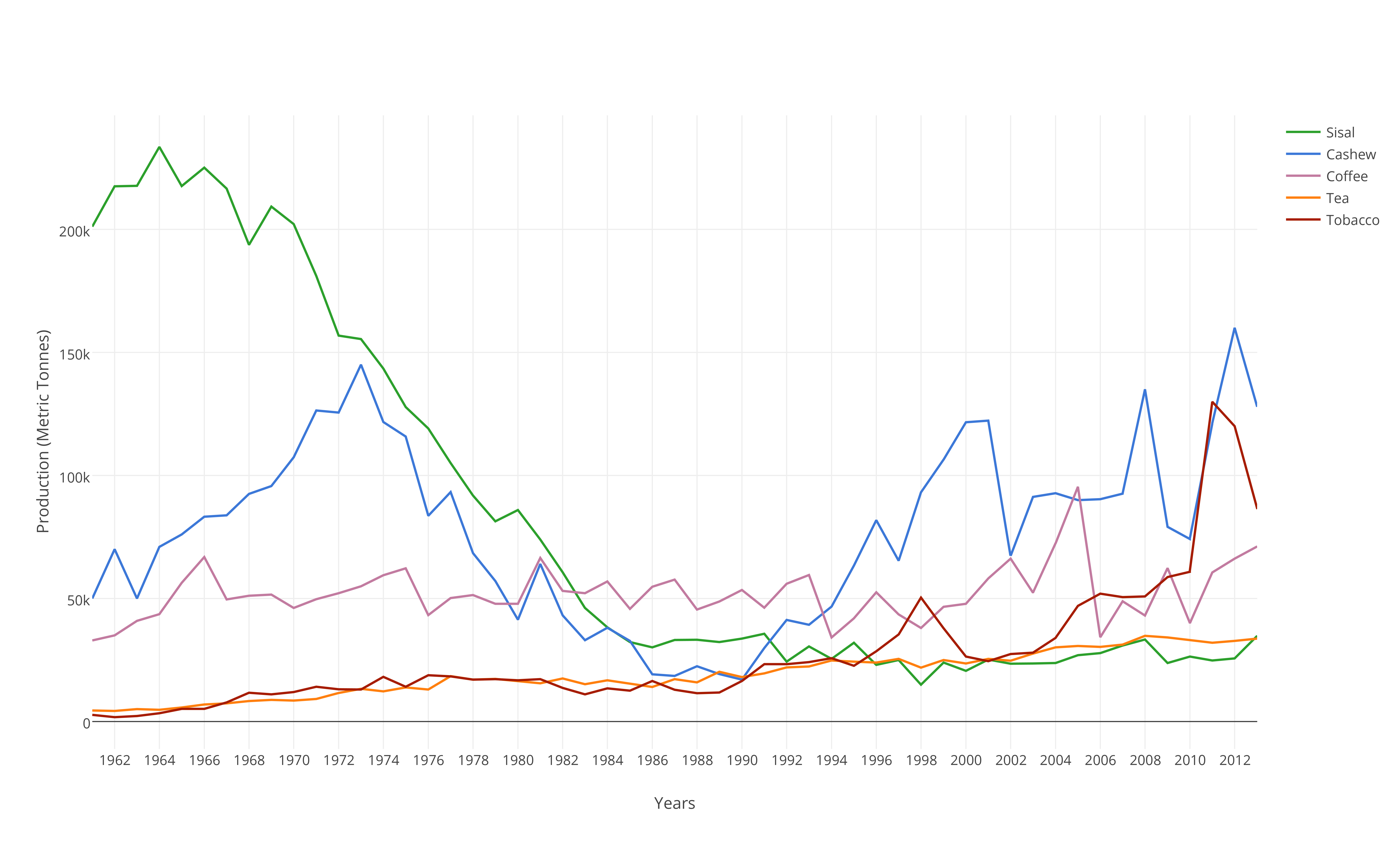
Cash crops output since independence.

=== Coffee production ===
Coffee is grown on a large scale on both estates and by smallholders that form co-operatives and involves over 400,000 farmers. Coffee has been grown in the country since the colonial times and is a major export crop, earning over 17 percent of the country's foreign exchange. Tanzania mainly grows the arabica type; however, small farms in the Kagera Region grow Robusta coffee. Tanzanian coffee is globally more commonly known as Kilimanjaro Coffee.

=== Sisal production ===
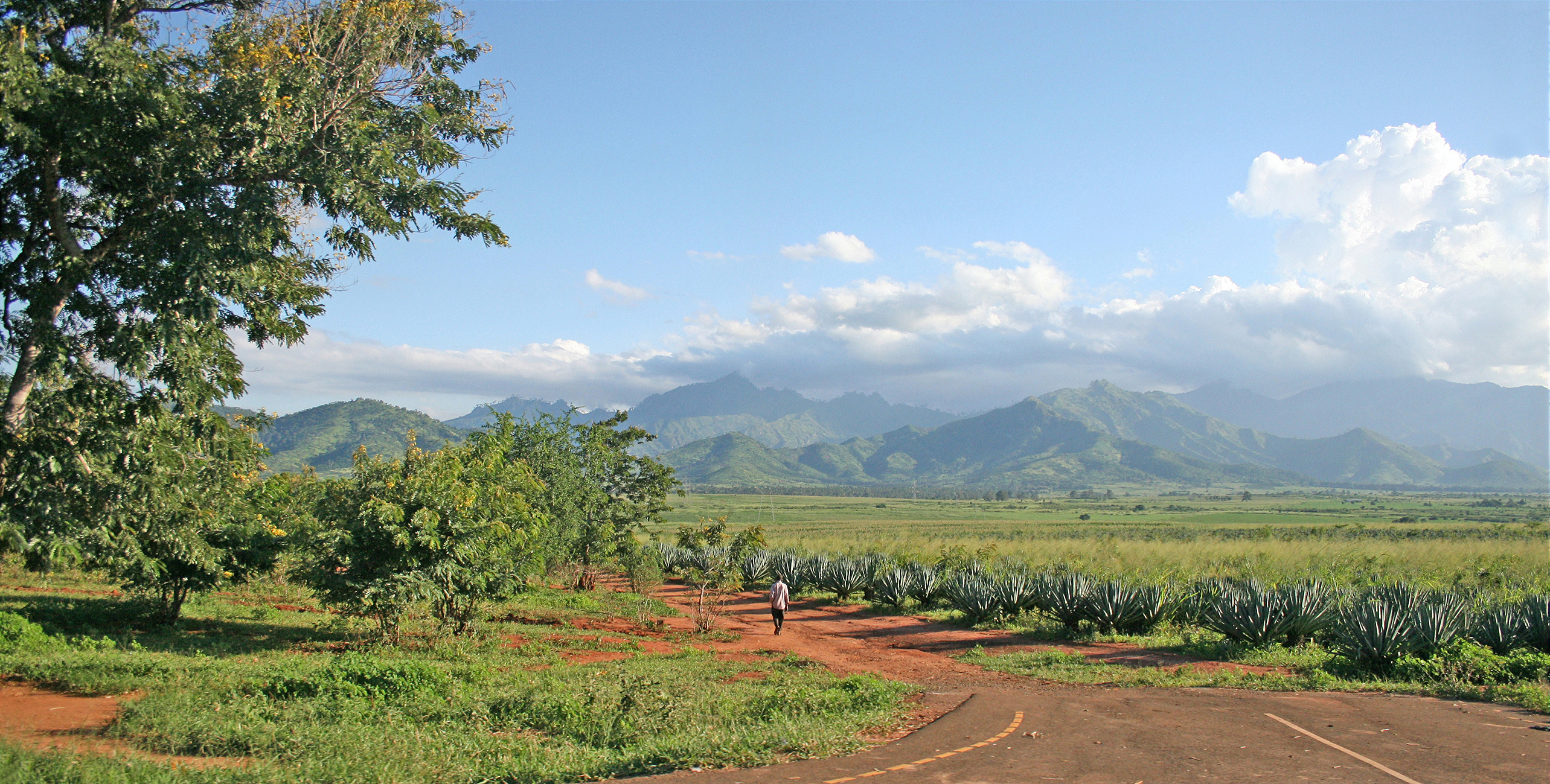
Sisal plantation at Mt Uluguru in Tanzania.

Sisal was brought to Tanzania from Mexico by the German East Africa Company in the late 19th century. Sisal is grown in the northern regions of the country, such as Tanga and Kilimanjaro. At the time of independence in 1961, Tanzania was the largest producer of sisal in the world. Sisal production continued to decline after the Ujamaa movement and the continued depreciation of world prices. In recent years, the government has tried to liberalize the sector to encourage growth and increase export revenues.

=== Cashew production ===
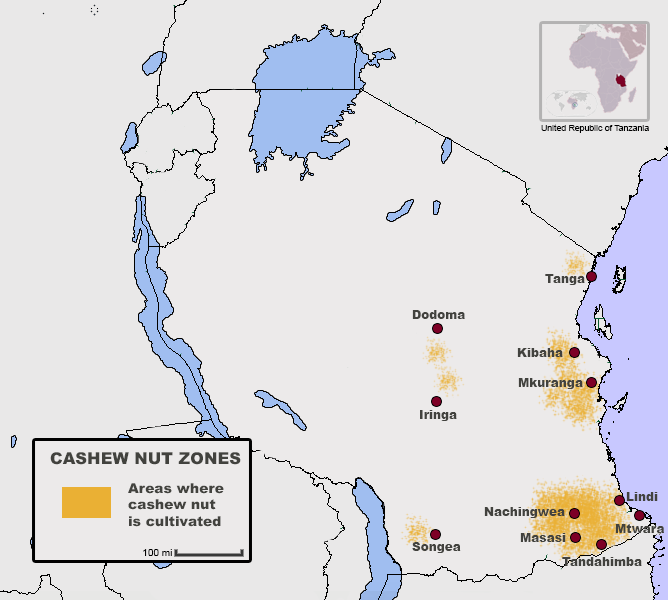
Map showing the 11 locations where cashew nuts are grown in Tanzania.

Tanzania is one of the largest cashew producers in Africa, with exports providing 10–15 percent of the country's foreign exchange. The country is the eighth-largest grower of cashew nut in the world and ranks fourth in Africa. The country provides 20% of Africa's cashew nut and only trails in production of Nigeria, Cote D'Ivoire, and Guinea-Bissau, according to figures released in 2012 by United Nations Food and Agricultural Organisation (FAO). The country has been engaged in the production of the cash crop since before independence in the years 1960s however, poor regulation and lack of reliable payments to farmers have posed significant challenges to the Cashew Nut farming industry in Tanzania. Guinea-Bissau, a country a tenth of the area of Tanzania's, has a significantly greater yield.

The cash crop is usually cultivated in the southern coastal regions of the country, near the towns of Mtwara, Kilwa and Dar es Salaam. The sale and marketing of the product is run by the Cashewnut Board of Tanzania, through various farmer co-operatives. More than ninety percent of the exports are destined for India and almost entirely in raw form. The lack of domestic processing firms costs the country vital foreign revenues and thousands of jobs. The Tanzanian government has been facing challenges for finding potential investors in order to revive the cashew processing industry in Tanzania.

== Food Crops ==
The 11 food crops grown in Tanzania are as below list;

1. Bean
2. Cassava
3. Maize
4. Millet
5. Oil palm
6. Potato
7. Rice
8. Sorghum
9. Sugarcane
10. Sunflower
11. Wheat

== Herbs, vegetables and spices in Tanzania ==
Herbs, vegetables and spices in Tanzania include in the list below;

1. Cabbage
2. Capsicum
3. Carrot
4. Clove
5. Cinnamon
6. Cucumber
7. Garlic
8. Mint
9. Onion
10. Pea
11. Spinach

== Fruits in Tanzania ==
Fruits in Tanzania include in the list below;

1. Avocado
2. Banana
3. Coconut
4. Clementine
5. Guava
6. Grape
7. Jackfruit
8. Lemon
9. Lime
10. Lychee
11. Mangoe
12. Orange
13. Okra
14. Passion fruit
15. Papaya
16. Pear
17. Pineapple
18. Tamarind
19. Tomato
20. Strawberry
21. Watermelon

== Statistics ==
=== Main crop production ===
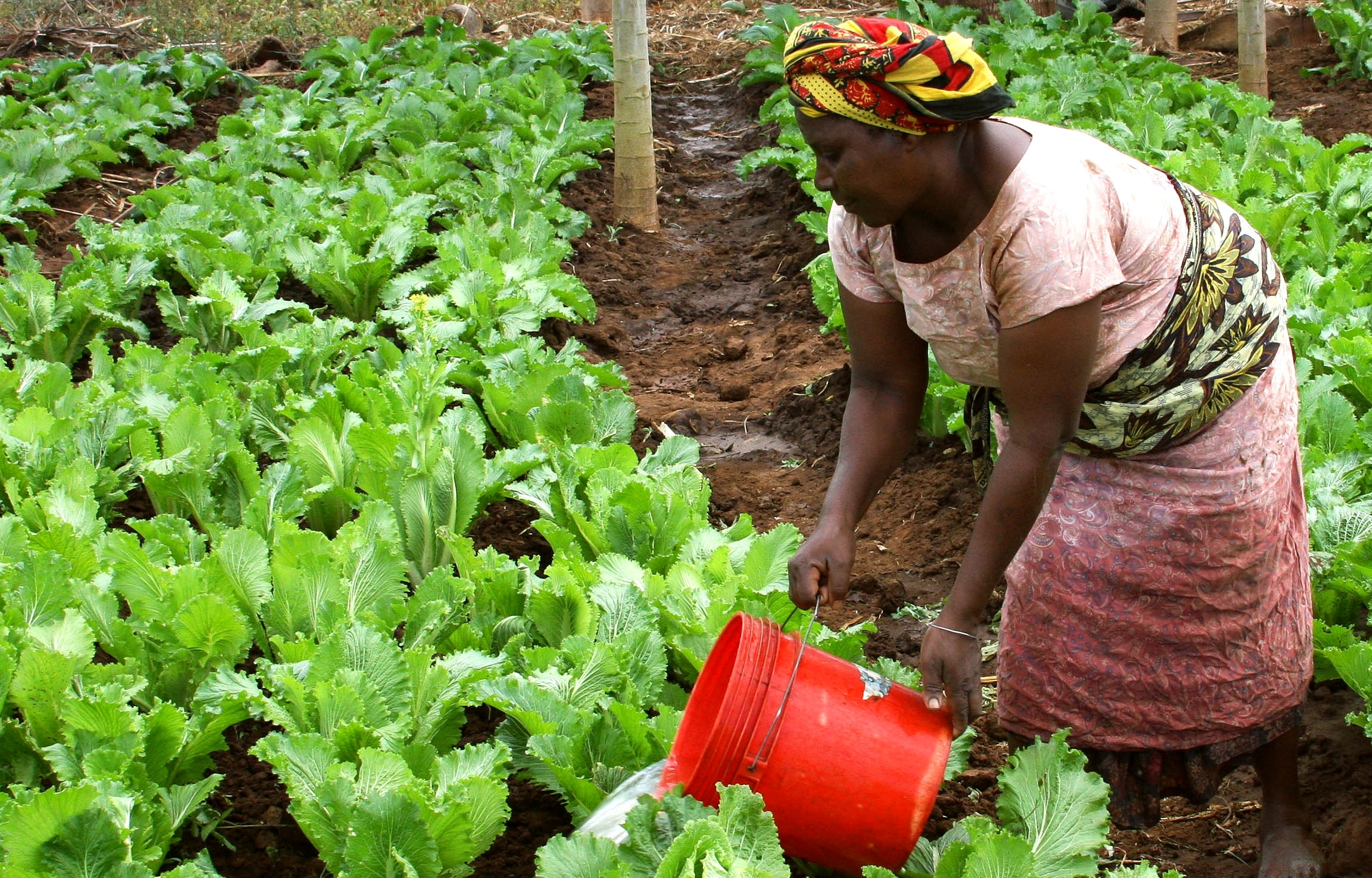
A woman manually irrigating crops during the day time.

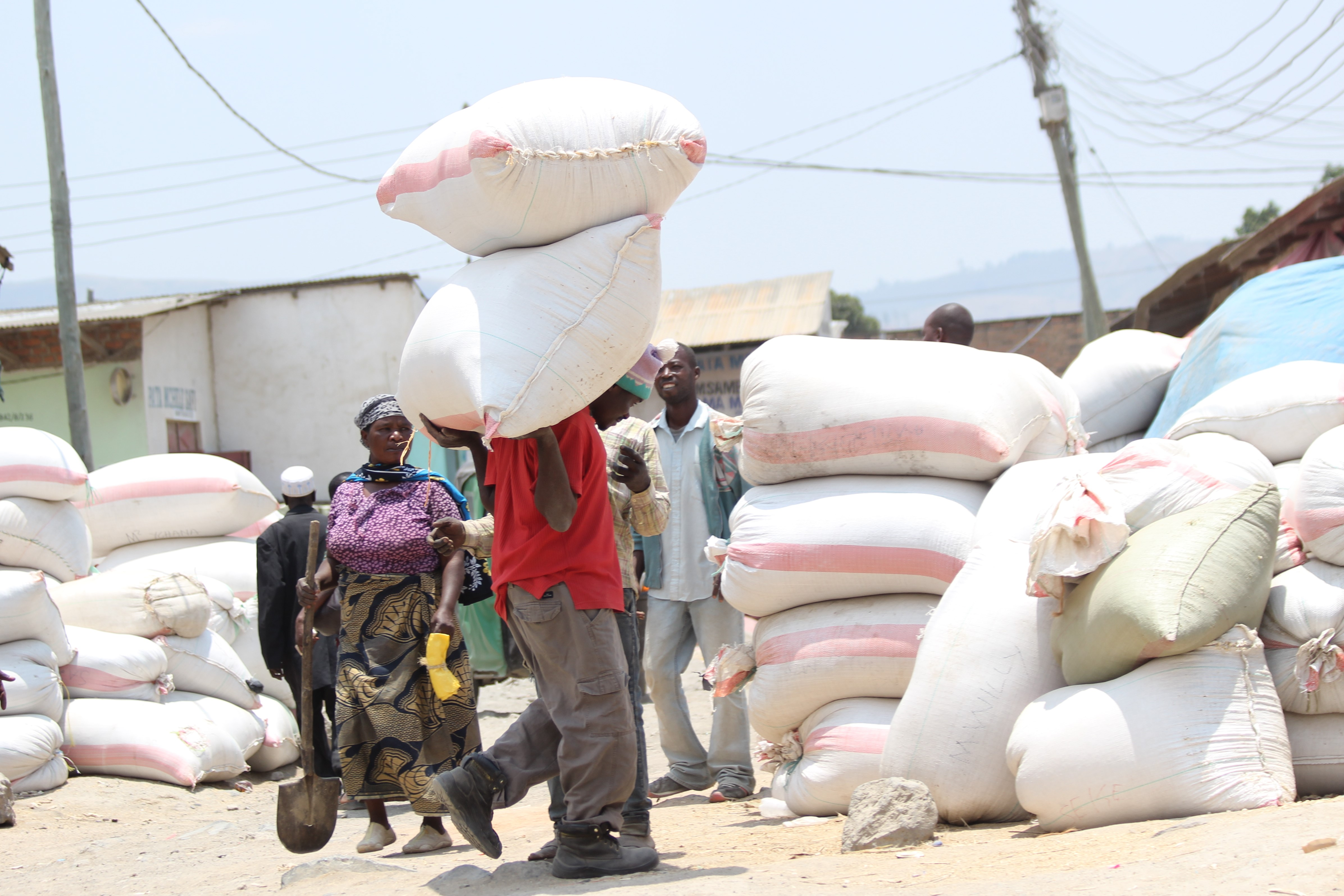
A man helping transport bags of rice manually outdoors during the day time.

The ten non-cash crop production from 2013 as reported by the Food and Agriculture Organization of the United Nations as below table:

Number	Food Crop	Area Harvested	Yield Hg/Ha	Production, 1000 tonnes
1	Casava	950,000	56,842	5,400
2	Maize	4,000,000	11,750	4,700
3	Sweet Potatoes	675,000	45,926	3,100
4	Sugar Cane	30,000	1,000,000	3,000
5	Rice, Paddy	900,000	20,889	1,880
6	Potatoes	175,000	74,286	1,300
7	Beans, dry	1,300,000	8,846	1,150
8	Sunflower seed	810,000	13,370	1,083
9	Sorghum	900,000	9,444	850
10	Groundnuts, with shell	740,000	10,608	785
Source: FAO

== See also ==
- Ministry of Agriculture, Food Security and Cooperatives
- Tanzania Mercantile Exchange
