= National Social Security Fund =

National Social Security Fund may refer to:

- National Social Security Fund (Kenya)
- National Social Security Fund (Tanzania)
- National Social Security Fund (Uganda)
- The National Social Security Fund that is managed by National Council for Social Security Fund - China
