= Tanzania Agricultural Development Bank =

Bank of Tanzania

Tanzania Agricultural Development Bank Benki ya Maendeleo ya Kilimo Tanzania
- Type: State-owned
- Industry: Development finance institution
- Founded: 7 August 2015
- Headquarters: Dar es Salaam, Tanzania
- Key people: Thomas Samkyi (MD)
- Total equity: TSh 60 billion (2015)
- Owner: Tanzanian Government (100%)

The Tanzania Agricultural Development Bank (TADB) is bank in Tanzania dedicated to farmers. The government has pledged to provide $500 million (TSh 850 bn) as working capital.

== See also ==
- List of national development banks
