= Maize production in Tanzania =

The Portuguese first introduced maize production in Tanzania on Pemba Island in the 16th century, and by the 17th century, maize production spread to other parts of Tanzania including the Tanzanian mainland. Production of maize expanded until recent years. However, Tanzania is still a leading country for maize production in East Africa.

== Cultivation ==
45% of Tanzanian land is used for maize cultivation in which 4.5 million of households utilize their land for maize cultivation. The contribution of smallholders is 85% of the total national cultivation with the rest of contribution being from community farms and large farms (private and public) Cultivation of maize is conducted in two different rainfall seasons of the year, which are:

- Bimodal (Vuli) October to December
- Unimodal (Msumi) March to May.

About 47% of maize is grown during the Vuli season and 41% is grown during the Msumi season.

== Harvesting ==
The harvesting is conducted three times per year with respect to above cultivation seasons.

== Constraints ==
The challenges of maize production in Tanzania includes:

- Drought
- Extremely low levels of Mechanised agriculture
- Pests
- Infestation by insects
- Fertilizer
- Weeds
- Poor infrastructure
- Storage facilities

The common diseases that attack maize in Tanzania are:

- Common rust (Puccinia sorghi)
- Leaf bright (Helminthosporium turcicum)
- Lowland rust (Puccinia polysora)
