= Tanzania Cigarette Company =

Tobacco company operating in Tanzania

Tanzania Cigarette Public Limited Company
- Company type: Public limited company
- Traded as: DSE: TCC
- ISIN: TZ1996100032
- Industry: Tobacco
- Founded: 1961; 65 years ago
- Headquarters: Dar es salaam, Tanzania
- Area served: Tanzania and Neighboring countries
- Key people: Mr. Takashi Araki (Chairman & CEO)
- Products: Cigarettes
- Revenue: ▲TSh 499.5 billion (2016)
- Operating income: ▼TSh 95.3 billion (2016)
- Net income: ▲TSh 68.7 billion (2016)
- Number of employees: 445+
- Parent: Japan Tobacco International
- Subsidiaries: TCC (Kenya) Ltd.
- Website: TCC PLC Profile

Tanzania Cigarette Company Ltd. ("TCC"; DSE: TCC) is a tobacco company operating in Tanzania. The company started operations in 1961 as the East African Tobacco. Years later the government bought a large stake in the company and nationalized the company during the Ujamaa movement in 1975.

TCC has been listed on the Dar es Salaam Stock Exchange since 16 November 2000. 75% of the company is owned by Japan Tobacco International. it's a component company of the Tanzania All Share Index

== History ==
=== Incorporation ===
The Company was established as East African Tobacco in 1961. The factory was officially opened by Mwalimu Julius K. Nyerere on December 4, 1961. The Company now British American Tobacco (BAT) operated the company post-independence. In 1967, the government of Tanzania acquired a 60% stake in the company. During the socialist movement in Tanzania, in 1975 the government acquired the renaming 40% of the stake from the company and becomes the sole owner of the company. The company is renamed to Tanzania Cigarette Company ltd.

=== Privatization ===
After years of poor operation and management, the government sold 51% of its stake in the company to RJ Reynolds in 1995. As part of its purchase of some of the assets of RJ Reynolds in 1999, Japan Tobacco Inc. (JT) acquired a 51% interest in TCC. In September 2000, JT purchased an additional 24% of the shares through its international tobacco division, Japan Tobacco International (JTI), increasing its holdings to 75% of the shares.

=== Public offering ===
Months after the acquisition of TCC by Japan Tobacco International, TCC was listed on the Dar Brouse with JTI still holding a 75% majority stake.

== Corporate affairs ==
=== Brands ===
In 2005 a dispute over the "Supermatch" trademark was resolved against Burundi Tobacco Company (BTC) by the High Court of Tanzania. BTC had registered the trademark in 1990, but did not renew it when it expired in 1997. TCC applied to register "Supermatch" as its trademark, but was refused by the Registrar. In 2002 BTC said it assigned the trademark to Mastermind Tobacco (Tanzania). The court ruled to BTC had abandoned the trademark, which should be granted to TCC.

TCC is the only producer of cigarettes in the country. In 2011 TCC brands conquer 90% of the Tanzanian market, while 5% is controlled by British American Tobacco whose factory is in neighboring Kenya, and 5% by foreign brands.

=== Ownership ===
Tanzania Cigarette Company (TCC:DSE) is traded on the Stock Exchange since November 2000. Japan Tobacco International has held majority stake of 75% since September 2000.
As of December 2016 the stock of TCC is owned by the following institutions:

Shareholder	Interest
JT International Holding B.V.	75.0%
Kingsway Fund	9.3%
General Public	7.0%
Parastatal Pension Fund (PPF)	3.0%
Government of Tanzania	2.2%
Public Service Pension Fund (PSPF)	1.0%
Others	2.5%

=== Business trends ===
Below are the recent business trends for TCC. TCC financial year ends on 31 December.

	2010	2011	2012	2013	2014	2015	2016
Gross Turnover (TSh million)	321,777	376,778	422,594	445,633	461,720	496,675	499,457
Net Sales (TSh million)	211,008	250,344	281,419	290,601	283,910	300,550	300,962
Net Income (TSh million)	60,200	70,942	85,941	78,058	68,600	65,711	68,669
Debt Ratio (TL/TA)	27%	27%	27%	27%	28%	24%	27%
Dividend per share (TSh)	300/=	600/=	750/=	750/=	650/=	600/=	600/=
Notes/sources							

=== Brands ===
- Embassy - Registered in January, 1948 in Tanganyika in the name of Brit-Am Tobacco (Tanzania) Limited.
- Sweet Menthol (SM) - Launched in 1961 during incorporation.
- Portsman - Formerly Sportsman
- Club - Launched in 1998
- Safari - Launched in 2005
- Camel - Originally the American brand introduced in Tanzania by TCC.
- Iceberg - Premium Menthol cigarette launched in 2008

== See also ==
- Dar es Salaam Stock Exchange
- Japan Tobacco International
- British American Tobacco

== Sources ==
- Tanzania Cigarette Company Limited vs Burundi Tobacco Company Limited (PDF), High Court of Tanzania, 22 July 2005
