= National Investments Company Limited Tanzania =

Tanazanian investments company

National Investments Company Limited (NICOL) Tanzania
- Formerly: National Investments Company (NICO)
- Type: Public
- Traded as: DSE: NICOL
- Industry: Investment fund
- Founded: 25 June 2003
- Headquarters: Dar es Salaam, Tanzania
- Key people: Adam Wamunza(CEO)
- Website: Company website

National Investments Company Limited (NICOL) Tanzania is a Tanzanian investments company headquartered in Dar es Salaam. It was incorporated in June 2003 as National Investments Company (NICO). In 2007 the company renamed itself as the National Investments Company Limited (NICOL). The company was one of the first few companies to be listed on the Dar es Salaam Stock Exchange in 2004, it's a component company of the Tanzania All Share Index The majority of the company's investment portfolio is in securities, however, it also owns two active subsidiaries.

== History ==
=== Public listing ===
The company listed on the Dar es Salaam Stock Exchange all of its 1.6 billion shares at TSh 400/= per share, on 15 July 2008. In 2011 the Capital markets authority forced them to de-list as they had not provided financials for 2009, 2010 and engaged in a sale of assets that was not in accordance to the law. At the time of de-listing the company shares were trading for 270/=.

However, in 2017 the company re-surfaced and declared its first divided of 25/= per share after 10 years of operations. After the dividend declaration, the company announced its plan for re-listing on 6 June 2018 at 300/= per share.

== Corporate affairs ==
=== Business trends ===
The key trends for NICOL over recent years are shown below (as at year ending 31 December):

	2010	2011	2012	2013	2014	2015	2016	2017	2018
Profit before Taxation (TSh billion)	-2.5	-1.4	-0.3	0.9	0.9	0.2	9.2	1.2	4.2
Net Asset Value (TSh billion)	25.7	32.3	42.2	95.5	125	95.3	109	107	94
Earning Per Share	-60	-30	-4	30	33	11	232	33	81
Notes/sources									

=== Subsidiaries ===
- Tanzania Meat Company Limited – The company was founded on 28 July 2008 through a partnership between NICOL and the government's National Ranching Company (NARCO), with NICOL owning 51% of the shares. The company operates an abattoir in Dodoma.
