= Twiga Cement =

Tanzanian cement company

Coordinates: 06°39′47″S 39°10′03″E

Tanzania Portland Cement Company Limited
- Company type: Public
- Traded as: DSE: TWIGA
- Industry: Cement
- Founded: 1966; 60 years ago
- Headquarters: Dar es Salaam, Tanzania
- Key people: Hakan Gurdal; Chairman; Alfonso Velez; Managing Director
- Products: Twiga Cement
- Revenue: ▲Aftertax:TZS:56.46 billion (US$25 million) (2018)
- Total assets: TZS:322.76 billion (US$141 million) (2018)
- Number of employees: 285 (2018)
- Parent: Heidelberg Group
- Website: Company website

Tanzania Portland Cement Company Limited (TPCC), also Twiga Cement, is a cement-manufacturing company in Tanzania. It became the first company in Tanzania to manufacture cement in 1966.

As of 2020, Twiga Cement is a member of the Heidelberg Group, and Twiga's shares of stock are listed on the Dar es Salaam Stock Exchange, where they trade under the symbol TWIGA. it's a component company of the Tanzania All Share Index

== Location ==
The factory of Tanzania Portland Cement Public Limited Company is located on Wazo Hill, along the Dar es Salaam–Bagamoyo Road, approximately 18 kilometres (11 mi), by road, northwest of downtown Dar es Salaam, Tanzania's commercial and financial capital. The geographical coordinates of the Twiga Cement factory are: 06°39'47.0"S, 39°10'03.0"E (Latitude:-6.663064; Longitude:39.167502).

== Overview ==
Twiga Cement is a large cement manufacturer that manufactures three brands of portland cement: Twiga Ordinary, Twiga Plus+ and Twiga Extra. In 2014, the factory expanded and increased its manufacturing capacity to 1,900,000 tonnes (2,094,391 tons) annually.

According to the company's annual report, in December 2018, the company's total assets were TSh 322.76 billion (US $141 million), with shareholders' equity of TSh 224.94 billion (US $98 million). That year, the company employed 285 people.

== History ==
The company was founded in 1959 as Tanzania Portland Cement Company, producing its first bag of cement in mid-1966. It was a joint venture between Cementia AG of Switzerland, with 80 percent shareholding and the government of Tanzania, through the Tanzania Development Corporation, owning 20 percent. In 1967, the government increased its ownership to 50 percent. In 1973, the company was nationalized, with the government of Tanzania now owning 100 percent of the company.

In 1992, the government sold 13 percent ownership to Scancem International ANS of Norway and another 13 percent to Swedfund International AB of Sweden. The government retained 74 percent ownership. In 1998, the company was re-privatized. At that time, the shareholding in the company was as illustrated in the table below.

Twiga Cement stock ownership in 1998
Rank	Name of owner	Percentage ownership
1	Government of Tanzania	39.4
2	TPCPLC employees	0.6
3	Scancem International	41.0
4	Swedfund International	19.0
	Total	100.0

== Ownership ==
In 2006, the government of Tanzania divested from the company by floating its shareholding on the Dar es Salaam Stock Exchange, where the company stock trades under the symbol TWIGA.

As of December 2018, the shareholding in the company stock was as depicted in the table below.

Twiga Cement shareholding as at 31 December 2018
Rank	Name of owner	Domicile	Percentage ownership
1	Scancem International DA	Norway	69.25
2	Parastatal Pension Fund	Tanzania	5.42
3	Standard Chartered Bank Uganda	Uganda	5.28
4	Public Service Pension Fund	Tanzania	1.76
5	National Social Security Fund	Tanzania	1.24
6	Murtaza Basheer Nasser	Tanzania	0.90
7	Umoja Unit Trust Scheme	Tanzania	0.79
8	Sayed H. Kadri & Group	Tanzania	0.59
9	Government Employees Provident Fund	Tanzania	0.56
10	Said Salim Awadh Bakhresa	Tanzania	0.51
11	9,487 other investors		13.70
	Total		100.00

== Governance ==
Hakan Gurdal serves as the chairman of the board of directors. Alfonso Velez serves as the managing director.

== See also ==
- Tanga Cement
- Cement in Africa
