= Dar es Salaam Stock Exchange =

Stock exchange in Tanzania

- Type: Public
- Location: 14th Floor, Golden Jubilee Towers, Ohio Street, Ilala, Dar es Salaam, United Republic of Tanzania
- Coordinates: 6°48′48.9″S 39°17′21.0″E
- Founded: 19 September 1996
- Owner: Government of Tanzania (15%); Public (85%)
- Key people: Daniel Ole Sumayan (Chairman); Peter Situmbeko Nalitolela (CEO)
- Currency: Tanzanian shilling
- No. of listings: 29
- Market cap: TSh 23,721.49 billion June 2015
- Indices: Tanzania All Share Index; DSEI Dar Stock Exchange Index; IA Industrial & Allied; BI Banks, Finance and Investment
- Website: dse.co.tz

The Dar es Salaam Stock Exchange (DSE) is a stock exchange located on Junction of Kawawa road and New Bagamoyo road,Mikocheni, North of Dar es Salaam, the commercial capital and largest city in Tanzania. It was incorporated in September 1996 and trading started in April 1998. It is a member of the African Stock Exchanges Association and the World Federation of Exchanges. The exchange is open five days a week, from Monday through Friday. The trading days are weekly from Monday to Friday, starting from 10.00 am to 14.00 pm.

The activities of the exchange are monitored and supervised by the Capital Markets and Securities Authority (CMSA). The DSE operates in close association with the Nairobi Securities Exchange in Kenya and the Uganda Securities Exchange in Uganda. Plans are underway to integrate the three to form a single East African bourse.

== History ==
=== Incorporation ===
The Dar es Salaam Stock Exchange was established by the capital markets and security authority under the Capital Markets and Securities (CMS) Act of 1994 in Dar-es-salaam, Tanzania. The stock exchange was incorporated on 19 September 1996. The company was incorporated as a private company limited by guarantee and not having a share capital under the Companies Ordinate, therefore the DSE is a non-profit making body.

The exchange became operational on 15 April 1998, with TOL Gas Limited listing as the first company followed by the Tanzania Breweries Limited (TBL) during the same year. The delay was due to the necessary background operational preparations that were inevitable such as training of brokers and formulation of issuance and trading rules.

=== Demutualisation ===
On 29 June 2015, the Dar-es-Salaam Stock exchange re-registered to become a public limited company. The company changed its name from the Dar Es Salaam Stock Exchange Limited to Dar Es Salaam Stock Exchange Public Limited Company. The company began selling shares on 16 May 2016 and is the third exchange in Africa after Johannesburg Stock Exchange (2006) and Nairobi Securities Exchange (2014) to self list. The company offered 30% of the company's stock on the stock exchange represented by 15,000,000 ordinary shares.

== Corporate affairs ==
=== Business trends ===
The Dar-es-salaam stock exchange started its 5-year plan from June 2011. The financial year for the DSE used to begins 1 July and ends on 30 June. This was modified in 2017 to follow the calendar year.

	2011	2012	2013	2014	2015	2016	2017	2018	2019
Market Capitalization (TSh billion)	5,926	12,773	14,058	18,902	23,721	21,728	23,076	19,677	17,105
Value of Shares traded (TSh billion)	48.25	44.45	73.00	272.45	879.22	733.66	711	208	625
Tanzania Share Index (TSI points)	1,051.92	1,206.99	1,840.11	3,561.62	4,684.09	3,706.15	3,919	3,431	3,691
Income and Expense Summary									
Income (TSh billion)	2.01	1.81	2.09	3.5	4.35	4.79	10.70	6.43	8.39
Expenses (TSh billion)	1.73	2.25	2.04	3.00	3.07	3.10	5.44	4.67	4.84
Profit/Deficit (TSh million)	n/a	−338.85	186.35	501.01	1,942.85	2,010.26	5,266	1,757	3,547
Securities and Bonds Summary
Value of Outstanding Listed Govt. Bonds (TSh billion)	1,912.97	2,287.31	2,991.77	3,696.15	4,263.67	4,896.85	8,108	9,436	10,533
Treasury Bonds Listed (TSh billion)	918	433	977	n/a	n/a	n/a	n/a	n/a	n/a
Fixed Income Securities Trading (TSh billion)	363	248	452	477	n/a	n/a	n/a	n/a	n/a
Notes									

=== Ownership ===
As of December 2019, the company stock was owned by corporate entities and individuals. The largest shareholders are listed in the table below.

Dar-es-salaam Stock Exchange Stock Ownership
Rank	Name of Owner	Percentage Ownership
1	Government of Tanzania	15.0
2	Briarwood Capital Partners LP	12.0
3	Mr. Aunali F. Rajabali and Sajjad F. Rajabali	10.0
4	National Investments Company Limited Tanzania	5.0
5	General Public	58.0
6	TOTAL	100.0

=== Services ===
- DSE Mobile Trading was launched on 20 August 2015 to allow people upcountry where brokers are not present. The platform is called "soko la hisa kiganjani". The platform was designed by Maxcom Africa and is compatible with all Tanzanian cell phone operators. The program aims to allow more Tanzanians to participate in the bourse as currently only 400,000 people participate in a country of 50 million. At the end of 2015, over 1,000 investors used the platform. The platform continues to gain popularity and at the end of quarter 1 of 2016 the total number of users using the Mobile trading platform increased to 3000.

== Market listing ==
As of August 2020, there are 27 listed companies, five corporate bonds and eight government bonds. The table below summarises the current market listings:

Main Exchange

Symbol	Company	ISIN	Date Listed	Notes
1.TOL	Tol Gases Limited	TZ1996100008	15/04/1998	Production of Oxygen, Industrial Gases, Welding Equipment
2.TBL	Tanzania Breweries Limited	TZ1996100016	09/09/1998	Beer Brewing, Beer Marketing Beer Distribution
3.TATEPA	Tanzania Tea Packers	TZ1996100065	17/12/1999	Tea Packaging & Distribution, Coffee Packaging & Distribution
4.TCC	Tanzania Cigarette Company Limited	TZ1996100032	16/11/2000	Cigarettes, Tobacco Products
5.SIMBA	Tanga Cement Company Limited	TZ1996100057	26/09/2002	Cement
6.SWIS	Swissport Tanzania Plc.	TZ1996100040	26/09/2003	Aviation, Ground Handling, Cargo Handling
7.TWIGA	Tanzania Portland Cement Company Limited	TZ1996100024	29/09/2006	Cement
8.DCB	Dar es Salaam Community Bank	TZ1996100214	16/09/2008	Banking, Finance
9.NMB	National Microfinance Bank	TZ1996100222	06/11/2008	Banking, Finance
10.KA	Kenya Airways	KE0000000307	01/10/2004	Aviation
11.EABL	East African Breweries Limited	KE0000000216	29/06/2005	Beer, Gin, Spirits
12.JHL	Jubilee Holdings Limited	KE0000000273	20/12/2006	Insurance
13. KCB	KCB Group	KE0000000315	17/12/2008	Banking, Finance
14.CRDB	CRDB Bank	TZ1996100305	17/06/2009	Banking, Finance
15.NMG	Nation Media Group	KE0000000380	21/02/2011	Publishing, Printing, Television, Broadcasting
16.ACA	African Barrick Gold	GB00B61D2N63	07/12/2011	Mining
17.PAL	Precision Air Services Limited	TZ1996101048	21/12/2011	Aviation Services
18.SWALA	Swala Gas and Oil	TZ1996101865	11/08/2014	Oil & Gas
19.USL	Uchumi Supermarkets	KE0000000489	15/08/2014	Supermarkets
20.DSE	Dar es Salaam Stock Exchange	TZ1996102434	12/07/2016	Stock exchange
21.VODA	Vodacom Tanzania	TZ1996102715	15/08/2017	Telecommunication Service Provider
22.TICL	TCCIA Investment PLC		16/03/2018	Mutual fund, Finance
23.NICO	National Investments Company (Limited) Tanzania		03/06/2018	Mutual fund, Finance

- East African Breweries and Kenya Airways are cross listed at both the Uganda Securities Exchange and the Nairobi Securities Exchange.
- Kenya Commercial Bank Group, Nation Media Group and Uchumi Supermarkets are cross listed on the Nairobi Securities Exchange, the Uganda Securities Exchange and the Rwanda Stock Exchange
- National Investments Company (Limited) Tanzania was re-listed on 3 June 2018 after it was delisted in 2011. The company originally listed on 15 July 2008.

Enterprise Growth Market (EGM)

Symbol	Company	ISIN	Date Listed	Notes
1.MCB	Mwalimu Commercial Bank	TZ1996102129	27/11/2015	Banking
2.MBP	Maendeleo Bank	TZ1996101683	04/11/2013	Banking, Finance
3.MKCB	Mkombozi Commercial Bank	TZ1996101972	29/12/2015	Banking
4.YETU	Yetu Microfinance PLC	TZ1996102344	10/03/2016	Microfinance
5.MUCOB	MUCOBA Bank PLC	TZ1996102419	10/09/2016	Banking
6.JATU	JATU PLC	TZ1996103804	23/11/2020	Agriculture

== See also ==
- Tanzania Mercantile Exchange
- Economy of Tanzania
- List of stock exchanges
- List of African stock exchanges
- Stock exchanges of small economies
