= Sasatel (Dovetel) =

- Industry: Telecommunications
- Founded: 2008

Sasatel (Dovetel) was a telecommunications company with a unified national licence in Tanzania. Their licence was later revoked. The company rolled out a 3G wireless (based on Code Division Multiple Access (CDMA)) national network benefiting from the demand for data and broadband services to both high-end residential and corporate customers. ZTE (a Chinese multinational telecommunications equipment and systems company) is the supplier of the network infrastructure. Dovetel bundles its broadband offering with fixed voice services and offers limited mobility voice services to the low-end of the residential market in order to increase penetration beyond the traditional GSM target market for mobile voice. In addition to CDMA modems and routers, Sasatel offers WiMAX solutions providing greater bandwidth.

== History ==
Sub-Saharan Africa-focused infrastructure investor, PMEA African Infrastructure Opportunities plc (LON: PMEA), the Sovereign Wealth Fund of the Qatar Investment Authority (2007 Alternative Investment Market listing) held a 65% interest in Dovetel. At the launch of the company Tanzania had five active mobile networks, and according to the Mobile World figures, Vodacom (42%) and Zain (30.4%) dominate the market, along with Tigo (19.7%). Zanzibar Telecom (8%) does not operate in the mainland. Having presented its full suite of services to the market in Dar es Salaam under the "Sasatel" brand during June and July 2008, Dovetel ended 2009 as an established leading broadband provider with full coverage across the capital of Tanzania. Dovetel connected to the "Seacom" undersea cable, in turn connecting to the Gulf and Europe, which increased capacity while reducing the costs of international traffic.

Facing increased competition from existing operators (in terms of technological advances, as well as the need to expand and improve the network to compete), on 28 June 2012, a pioneer in socially responsible (SRI) activist investing in Tanzania secured a secondary sale of the business as an ongoing concern from PMEA.
