= Swala Gas and Oil =

Swala Oil & Gas (Tanzania) Plc
- Traded as: DSE: SWALA
- Industry: Oil and natural gas exploration
- Founded: 2011
- Headquarters: Dar es Salaam, Tanzania
- Website: Company website

Swala Gas and Oil is a Tanzanian oil and gas exploration company headquartered in Dar es Salaam. It was incorporated in 2011, and trades on the Dar es Salaam Stock Exchange under the ticker SWALA. It holds the exploration licenses for the Kilosa-Kilombero and Pangani fields, both located in the East African Rift. It is a subsidiary of Swala Energy.
