= Microfinance in Tanzania =

Microfinance in Tanzania began in 1995 with SACCOS (savings and credit cooperative organizations) and NGOs. Since then, the sector has expanded, although access to microfinance services remains limited in some parts of the country. Microfinance still remains a relatively new in Tanzania since it has not penetrated yet. Since 1995, microfinance has been linked to poverty alleviation programmes and initiatives involving women (Harvey et al., 2018).. The government also encouraged commercial banks to provide financial services to small businesses. A national microfinance policy was implemented in 2002 to support the development of the sector and establish microfinance as part of the country's poverty-reduction efforts. Since the implementation, micro financing was officially launched and recognized as a poverty alleviation tool. Due to its increased exposure and use in the nation, commercial banks have developed interests in offering microfinance. There are various microfinance banks that function as supporting institutions in the country that usually provide microfinance services. These may include the CRDB, National Microfinance Bank, and AKIBA (Lindvert et al., 2018). However there are also other few banks that are concerned with micro financing in Tanzania such as the PRIDE and SEDA, Tanzania Postal Bank and FINCA. Community and small banks have also expressed interest in the same including the NGOs and other non-profit organizations.

According to a survey conducted in 2005 by the Bank of Tanzania, the ministry of Finance provided an update of the microfinance practitioners' directory including other basic information regarding the institutions practicing micro financing as well as financial institutions,, commercial banks, SACCOS and NGOs and other credit institutions. Below is a list of three major commercial banks in Tanzania that provides microfinance services (Lindvert et al., 2018).

== Commercial banks in Tanzania ==
=== National Microfinance Bank ===
The National Microfinance Bank developed from the restructuring of the National Bank of Commerce (NBC) following changes to Tanzania's banking sector (Lindvert et al., 2018). The national microfinance bank (NMB) was registered by the registrar of companies and operates under the supervision of the Bank of Tanzania in the prudential supervision and licensing. Its main source of finances are capital and deposits which makes it a self –sustainable and independent institution. It usually enjoys the advantage of its network as well as its size which currently has about one hundred and four branches and agencies in almost every district in Tanzania with only twelve of its branches offering microfinance services. However the bank has a plan of adding about sixteen more offices and branches which would allow operations of microfinance services. Besides it size, its various microfinance operations usually have considerable stature (Mwizarubi et al., 2016).

Generally, its outstanding portfolio is about Tsh. 907.5 million towards the end of year 2001, with an average of 246 US dollars for each account. The various loans offered by this bank is usually similar to the loans offered by other microfinance such as CRDB and AKIBA. These loans are made to specific individuals, groups as well as other small business entrepreneurs. The basic product relating to microfinance that is offered in this bank is the saving deposits which offers the best and easiest way of acquiring a loan at NMB and also the most reliable way of acquiring a loan (Harvey et al., 2018). The bank expands and facilitates microfinance in three different methods which includes providing loans to small businesses for purchasing inventory and supply of commodities, collecting and paying clients to or from small and micro enterprises.

NMB encourages and expands microfinance in three ways:

- Loans to micro and small enterprises for the purchase and inventory and supply of goods
- Collection and payment services to large corporate clients to/from micro and small enterprises
- Add-on services such as money transfers and payroll services to both the large corporate clients and micro and small enterprises

=== AKIBA Bank ===
The bank has various branches in Tanzania, Dar es Salaam and in Moshi and Arusha. It has managed to take an approach which is relatively risky to microfinance through embracing and extending it within their different activities (Lindvert et al., 2018). Most of the microfinance services offered by this bank in Tanzania are mainly saving deposits. They usually operate under the Bank of Tanzania with their licensing being done by the Companies' Act. The bank has funded its operations through deposits and capital. AKIBA Bank was among the institutions involved in the early development of commercial microfinance in Tanzania. Its smaller network, compared with larger banks such as NMB, allowed it to place greater emphasis on microfinance services. The bank can attribute its success to the provision of services outside the usual financial services such as the teaching of invaluable business practices and deposits and savings as well. However, they have a challenge which is closely related to their success and their logistic planning. This is due to the increasing success such as the increased research and development, mobilization of more deposits to ensure loan demands are met human resource recruitment and training, and management of more improved management information systems (MIS) due to increased competition among other managerial issues (Harvey et al., 2018).

=== CRDB Bank ===
CRDB stands for Cooperatives Rural and Development Bank, however, it is not a cooperative. This privately owned bank is one of the oldest banking institutions in Tanzania and the third largest bank in Tanzania (The National Bank of Commerce and the National Microfinance Bank which split from NBC are the two largest banks). CRDB has 22 branches and two agencies in Tanzania. CRDB's endeavors in microfinance are fairly recent, with pilots in only 4 branches. CRDB was also created under the Companies' Act and is under the authority of the Bank of Tanzania (external regulation and supervision). However, unlike the other three commercial banks in microfinance, its primary source of funding comes from The Danish International Development Agency (DANIDA) which serves as one of CRDB's single largest shareholders.

CRDB is different from the other two national banks in that it primarily provides loans to microfinance institutions such as SACCOS (the largest type of MFI in this program). CRDB as a more conservative bank has taken this approach in order to reduce their risks in microfinance by loaning to groups such as SACCOs instead of micro and small enterprise borrowers. CRDB provides SACCOs with financial stability. CRDB's total assets are as of June 2003 US $370 million. Its total customer deposits account for US$330 million. Its pre-tax profit lies at US$7.4 million. Its total loans and advances (including microfinance loans to smaller microfinance institutions) are US$60 million.

=== Tanzania Postal Bank ===
The Tanzania Postal Bank is the 4th commercial bank that is involved in microfinance. Like the National Microfinance Bank, the Tanzania Postal Bank was created by an Act of Parliament and like the previous three banks, it too is under the Companies Registrar and under Tanzania Postal Bank Act No.11 of 1991 as amended by Act No.11 of 1992

== Other microfinance in Tanzania ==
=== Yetu Microfinance ===
Yetu Microfinance provides various financial services to the unbanked and under-banked people of Tanzania. The company offers credit products, such as solidarity group loans for clients who are organized into groups whose members serve as informal bank and cross-guarantee each other's loans; Mavuno loan products to afford members of solidarity group loan who have reached a loan ceiling of TZS 3 million and would like to borrower on individual capacity; small and medium enterprises loan products, including export and import, car, business/shop improvement, business capital, and processing and manufacturing loans; SRI agricultural loans; mixed farming loans to smallholder farmers for financing various crops; and instant loans, as well as education loans. Its deposit products comprise compulsory (collateral) savings; and voluntary deposits. Yetu Microfinance PLC has branches in Mzizima, Mbagala, Ifakara, Zanzibar, Kilwa, Lindi, Amani-Tanga and Mngeta. The company was founded in 1997 and is headquartered in Dar es Salaam, Tanzania.

=== Tunakopesha Limited ===
Tunakopesha Limited is a microfinance institution founded in 1992 that provides individual loans for salaried employees, group loans as well as business loans for small and medium enterprises. It operates through 54 branches in 25 regions across the country. Following along the path of the Company's ethos – "Enriching lives" – the company is mindful of its corporate responsibility and hence supports various social sectors, especially the education sector.

== Impact of microfinance in Tanzania ==
Microfinance programmes in Tanzania have been used by smallholder farmers and other rural borrowers. Access to small loans can provide financing for agricultural inputs and equipment, particularly for borrowers who have limited access to conventional bank credit. Credit facilities without collateral damage have allowed farmers to grow their business, by buying products like fertilizer and more advanced equipment to boost productivity, and profit from their harvest without the threat of inescapable debt. Microfinance has also provided non-farming rural citizens with employment opportunities by allowing them to more easily launch small businesses, such as carpentry and food vending. Although the adoption of this economic practice is somewhat low in rural households, studies show that if fully adopted, microfinance could collectively raise the incomes of Tanzanians living in rural areas. This statistic becomes even more significant when paired with the fact that 90% of the impoverished in Tanzania live in the countryside and thus, rural households make up the majority of those unqualified for conventional banking services. Not only has microfinance affected socioeconomic status within Tanzania, it has also improved gender inequality within disadvantaged communities. One study's results have shown a 90% increase in women-owned businesses and over 80% decrease in female genital mutilation and reported sexual assault in correlation with the introduction of microfinance. This introduction has also been found to be consistent with less absences from school. And while these services have not shown to improve Tanzanians' access to healthcare, they do appear to alleviate the stress of health-related costs, especially for parents. Overall, while the details on microfinance's impact on Tanzanian society and economy are yet to be determined, its implementation has certainly created a new financial culture based around saving and taking loans, replacing the previous negative stigma surrounding these practices.

== Works cited ==
Harvey, S., Lees, S., Mshana, G., Pilger, D., Hansen, C., Kapiga, S., & Watts, C. (2018). A cluster randomized controlled trial to assess the impact on intimate partner violence of a 10-session participatory gender training curriculum delivered to women taking part in a group-based microfinance loan scheme in Tanzania (MAISHA CRT01): study protocol. BMC women's health, 18(1), 55.

Lindvert, M., Patel, P. C., Smith, C., & Wincent, J. (2018). Microfinance Traps and Relational Exchange Norms: A Field Study of Women Entrepreneurs in Tanzania. Journal of Small Business Management.

Mwizarubi, M., Singh, H., Mnzava, B., & Prusty, S. (2016). Emerging Paradigms of Financing Tanzanian Microfinance Institutions and their Impact on Financial Sustainability–Part I. World, 6(1).
