= Dangote Industries Tanzania =

Tanzanian cement company

Dangote Industries Tanzania Limited
- Company type: Private
- Industry: Cement
- Founded: December 2015
- Headquarters: Mtwara, Tanzania
- Key people: Albert Corcos (Regional CEO)
- Parent: Dangote Cement
- Website: www.dangotecement.com/operations/tanzania

Dangote Industries Tanzania Limited is a Tanzanian cement company, a subsidiary of Dangote Cement. Dangote Cement operates a three million tonne (annual capacity) plant in Mtwara, southern Tanzania and is the largest cement factory in the country.

The company has also applied to build a 75MW coal powered power plant, adjacent to the factory, to provide reliable electrify to the factory and neighboring community.

== Products ==
The company only produces cement and has the following products in conventional 50 kg (110 lb) bags:

- 32.5R Portland Cement
- 42.5R Portland Cement

== See also ==
- Dangote Industries Tanzania Thermal Power Station
- Cement Manufactures of Tanzania
