= National Social Security Fund (Tanzania) =

Social security fund in Tanzania

- Type: Quasi-government
- Industry: Social security
- Predecessor: National Provident Fund
- Founded: 1997
- Headquarters: B. Mkapa Pension Towers, Plot no 759, Block No 10, Azikiwe Street, Kivukoni, Ilala District, Dar es Salaam Region, Tanzania
- Area served: Tanzania mainland
- Key people: Board Chairperson; Mwamini Juma Malemi; Director general Masha J. Mshomba
- Products: Pension fund
- Revenue: ▲TSh (2014)
- Total assets: ▲TSh (2011)
- Parent: Government of Tanzania
- Website: Fund Website

The National Social Security Fund (NSSF) is the government agency of Tanzania responsible for the collection, safekeeping, responsible investment, and distribution of retirement funds of all employees in all sectors of the Tanzania economy that do not fall under the governmental pension schemes. The headquartersare located in Kivukoni ward of Ilala District of Dar es Salaam Region. There are one other pension fund organizations in the country; the Public Services Social Security(PSSSF). Fund for all employees working directly under the government and for all employees working under governmental Parastatal organization

The NSSF was founded in 1997 as the successor to the defunct National Provident Fund (NPF). NSSF covers all other employers in the country and participation for both employers and employees is compulsory. NSSF is both a pension fund and a provident fund.

== History ==
The social security scheme dates back to 1945 where all social security issues were handled by the NPF. The National Provident Fund Act was enacted in 1964 and amended in 1968. The NPF became defunct in 1997 and the Act of Parliament No. 28 of 1997 replaced the NPF with the NSSF.

== Corporate affairs ==
=== Management and ownership ===
In Tanzania, the National Social Security Fund (NSSF) is one of the two main social security institutions, fully owned by the Government of Tanzania. NSSF provides coverage to employees from both the formal and informal sectors, making it the primary fund for private sector workers and self-employed individuals. Alongside NSSF is the Public Service Social Security Fund (PSSSF), which specifically covers employees in the public service. Initially, social security funds in Tanzania were restricted to different sectors of the workforce, but reforms introduced in the early 2000s liberalised membership, allowing NSSF to extend its services more broadly and become the most inclusive fund in the country.

==== Board members ====
The NSSF is managed by a board of twelve members, not including the director general. All board members must be Tanzanian nationals, and none of the board members may hold executive positions. The board has three specialized committees to manage operations: the Finance and Investment Committee, the Audit Committee, and the Staff Committee.

=== Business trends ===
A majority of NSSF's revenue comes from employee and employer contributions. The program is a compulsory scheme and is financed with a contribution of 20 percent of employees' salaries, with half of that paid by employers and the other half paid by employees.

The key trends for NSSF for 2007–2011 are shown below (as at year ending 30 June):

	2007	2008	2009	2010	2011
Registered Employees	14,927	15,560	16,592	17,666	18,779
Registered Employers	408,970	447,797	475,993	506,218	521,629
Amount Collected (TSh million)	162,379	205,385	255,271	300,089	356,512
Benefits Paid (TSh million)	50,522	81,818	85,120	110,135	136,596
Notes					

=== Headquarters ===
The NSSF head office is at the Benjamin Mkapa Pension Towers in Dar es Salaam. The building formerly was named the Mafuta House. NSSF has an office in all major cities and all regional capitals.

== Investments ==
=== Investment portfolio ===
Composition of NSSF Investment Portfolio as at 30 June 2011
1. Loans (37.0%)
2. Government Securities (22.0%)
3. Real Estate (21.0%)
4. Fixed Deposits (13.0%)
5. Equity (7.00%)

The NSSF's investment policy requires the fund to invest 75 percent of its total annual sources. The fund traditionally invests in government securities, fixed deposits, corporate bonds, loans, equities, and real estate. Most of the investments are in loans and government securities and a large percentage of the income comes from interest collections. Recently, the NSSF has begun to invest heavily in real estate and have undertaken multi-billion shillings construction projects in various parts of the country.

NSSF Investment Portfolio 2006/07 – 2010/11

Investment Category (TSh million)	2006/07	2007/08	2008/09	2009/10	2010/11
Government Securities	159,832	164,969	158,838	185,316	271,171
Fixed Deposits	35,545	68,298	145,292	180,963	161,711
Corporate Bond	12,755	10,804	8,054	6,418	800
Loans	117,315	182,251	283,949	386,763	453,403
Equity	96,911	61,047	62,988	69,303	77,999
Real Estate	108,292	182,908	198,558	200,440	251,538
Total Investment Base	530,652	670,280	857,681	1,029,206	1,216,624

=== Major Real-estate Projects ===
==== Nyerere Bridge ====
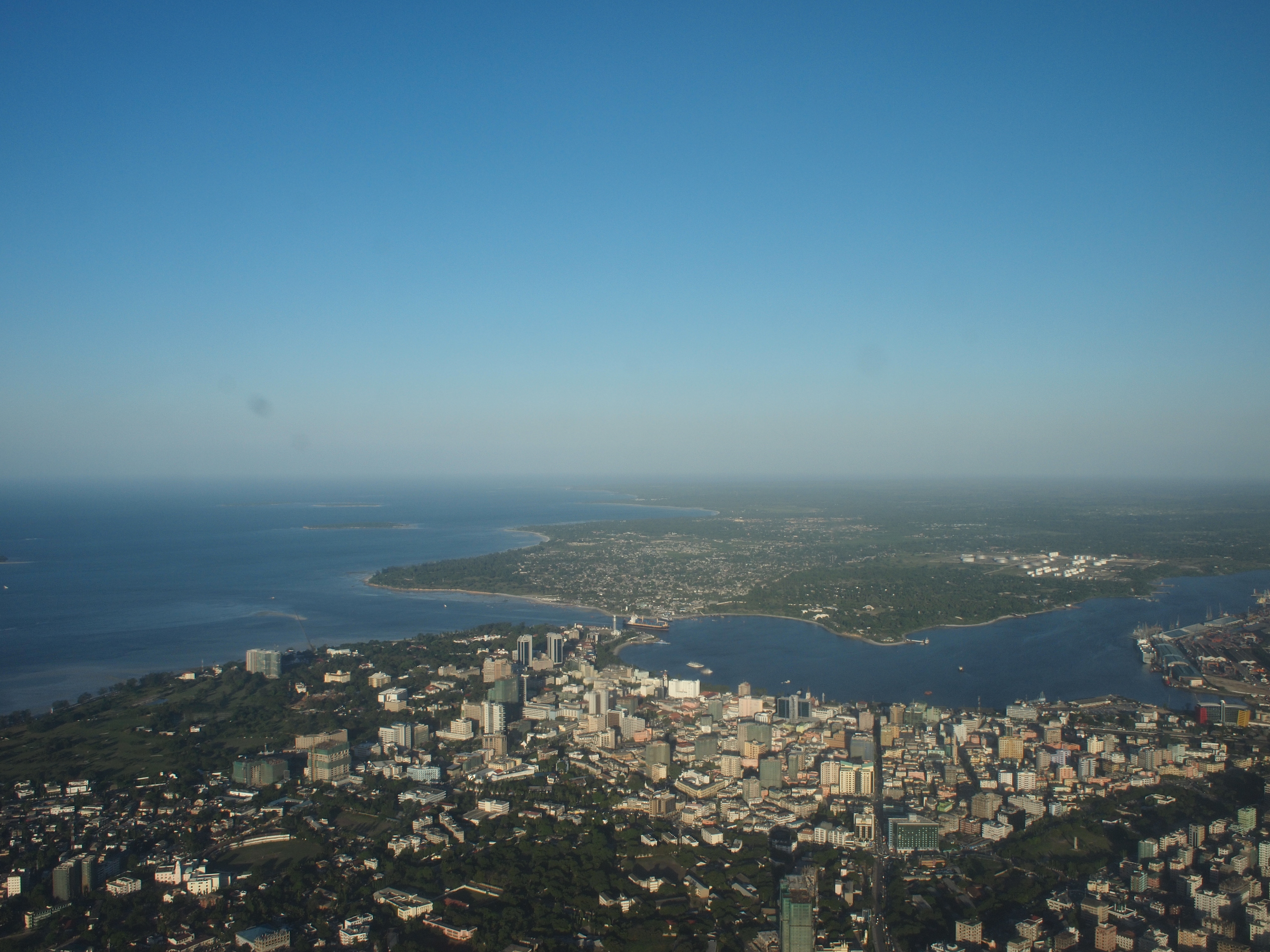
Aerial view of Dar es Salaam and the Kurasini Creek

Nyerere Bridge was built as a joint venture between the Government of Tanzania (40%) and the National Social Security Fund (60%). The Bridge is 680m long and connects the Kurasini in Dar es Salaam to Kigamboni. It was opened to the public in April 2016.

==== Dege Eco Village ====
Dege Eco Village was one of the largest investment projects conducted jointly by NSSF and Azimio Estate Housing Limited. The satellite township is located in the Kigamboni area and covers an area of about 350 acres. The state-of-the-art estate was slated for completion in 2017, however, due to fraud in the giant project, construction stopped in 2016. NSSF put the unfinished project up for sale in 2022 but negotiations with an anonymous investor collapsed and as of 2025 it remains abandoned.
