= Outline of Tanzania =

Overview of and topical guide to Tanzania

Flag of Tanzania

Coat of arms of Tanzania

Location of Tanzania

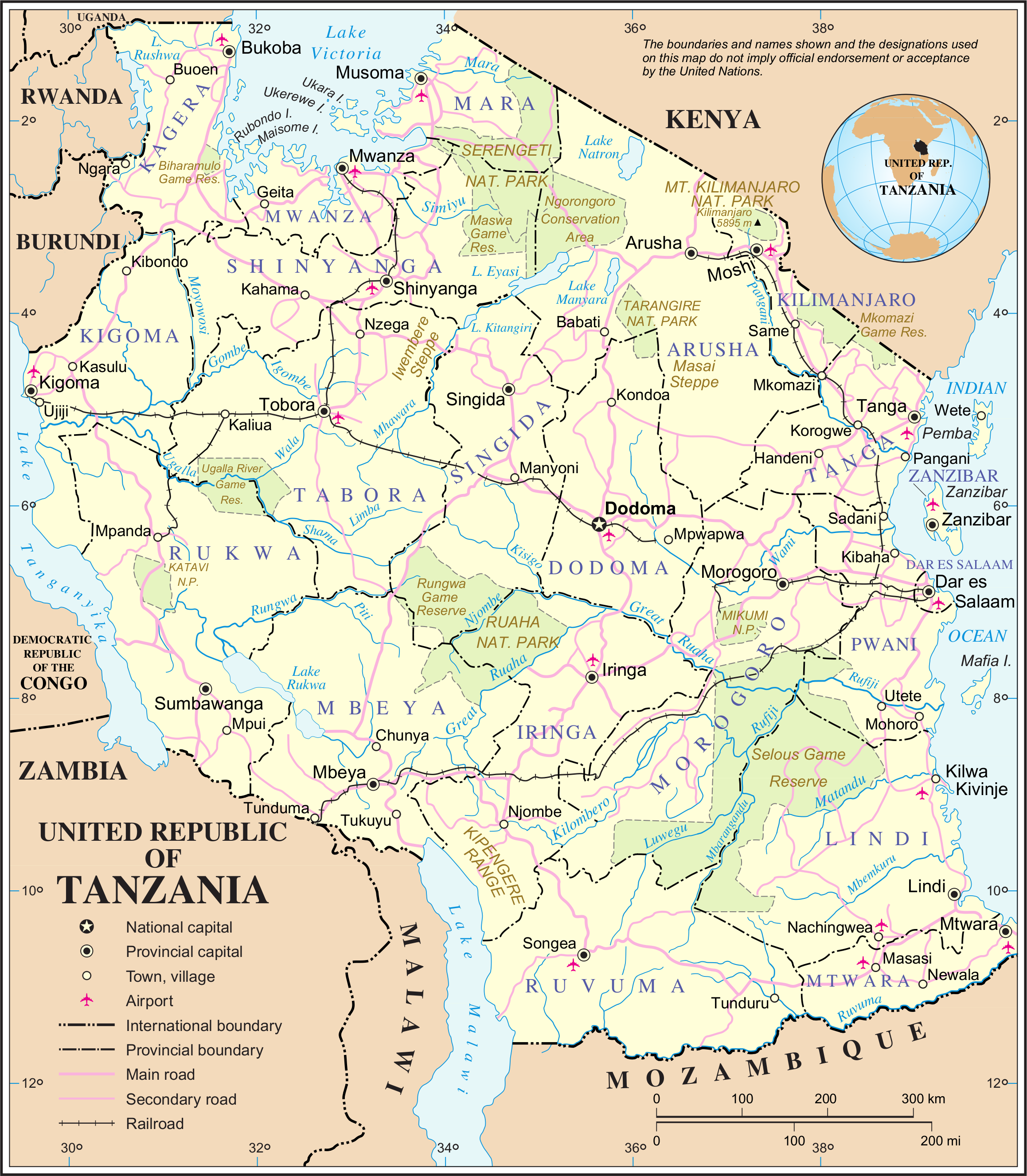
Enlargeable map of the United Republic of Tanzania

The following outline is provided as an overview of and topical guide to Tanzania:

Tanzania – sovereign country located in East Africa. Tanzania borders Kenya and Uganda on the north, Rwanda, Burundi and the Democratic Republic of the Congo on the west, and Zambia, Malawi and Mozambique on the south. To the east it borders the Indian Ocean.

== General reference ==
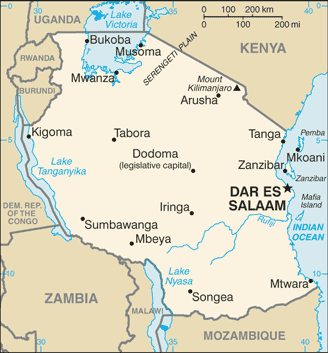
An enlargeable basic map of Tanzania

- Pronunciation: English: /ˌtænzəˈniːə/, Swahili: [tɑⁿzɑˈni.ɑ]
- Common English country name: Tanzania
- Official English country name: The United Republic of Tanzania
- Common endonym(s):
- Official endonym(s):
- Adjectival(s): Tanzanian
- Demonym(s): Tanzanian(s)
- Etymology: Name of Tanzania
- International rankings of Tanzania
- ISO country codes: TZ, TZA, 834
- ISO region codes: See ISO 3166-2:TZ
- Internet country code top-level domain: .tz

== Geography of Tanzania ==
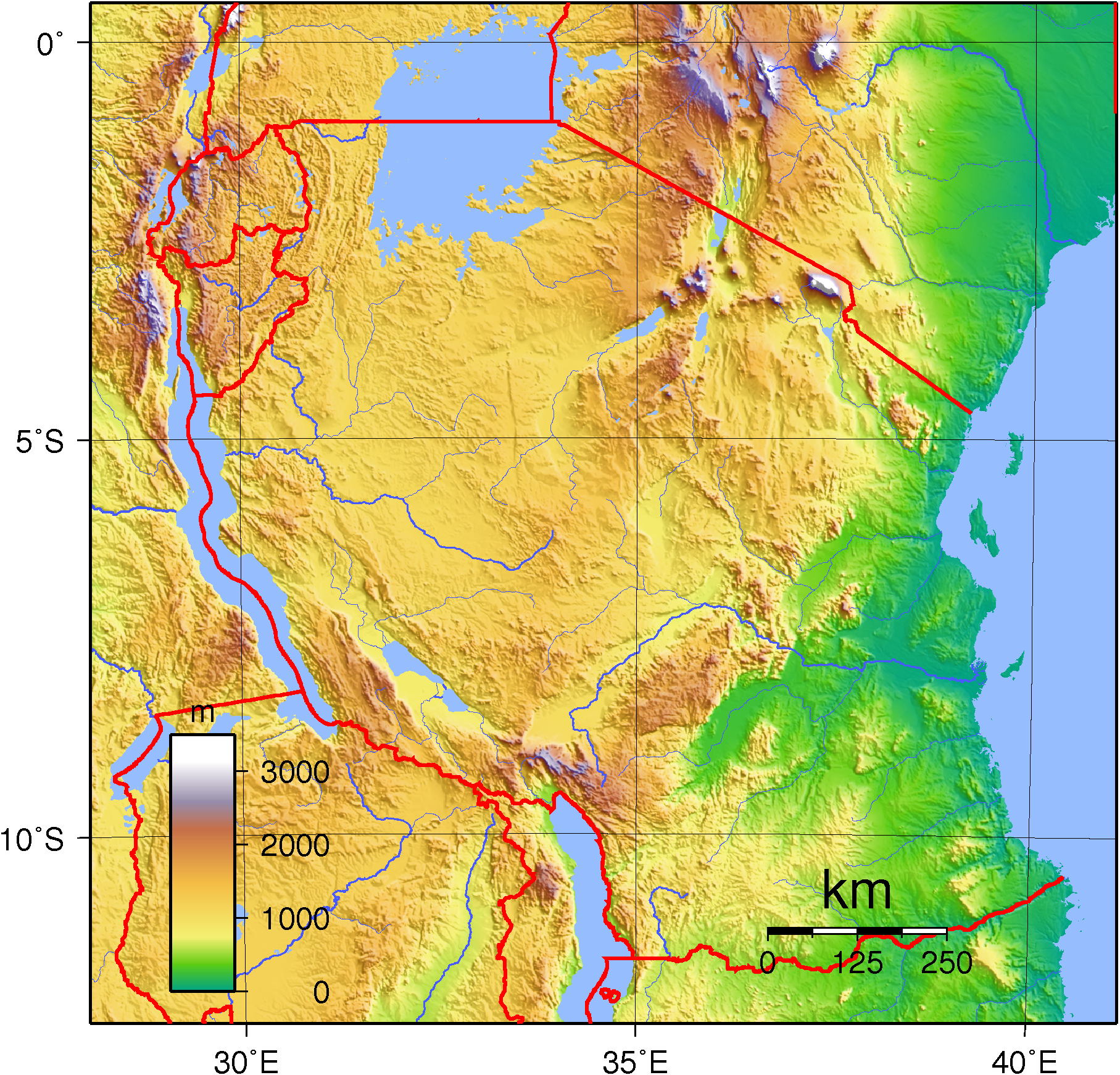
An enlargeable topographic map of Tanzania

Geography of Tanzania

- Tanzania is: a country
- Location:
  - Southern Hemisphere and Eastern Hemisphere
  - Africa
    - East Africa
  - Time zone: East Africa Time (UTC+03)
  - Extreme points of Tanzania
    - High: Mount Kilimanjaro 5,892 m (19,331 ft) – highest point in Africa
    - Low: Indian Ocean 0 m
  - Land boundaries: 3,861 km

Kenya 769 km
Mozambique 756 km
Malawi 475 km
Democratic Republic of the Congo 459 km
Burundi 451 km
Uganda 396 km
Zambia 338 km
Rwanda 217 km

- Coastline: Indian Ocean 1,424 km

- Population of Tanzania: 59,441,988 - 24th most populous country
- Area of Tanzania: 945,203 km^{2}
- Atlas of Tanzania

=== Environment of Tanzania ===
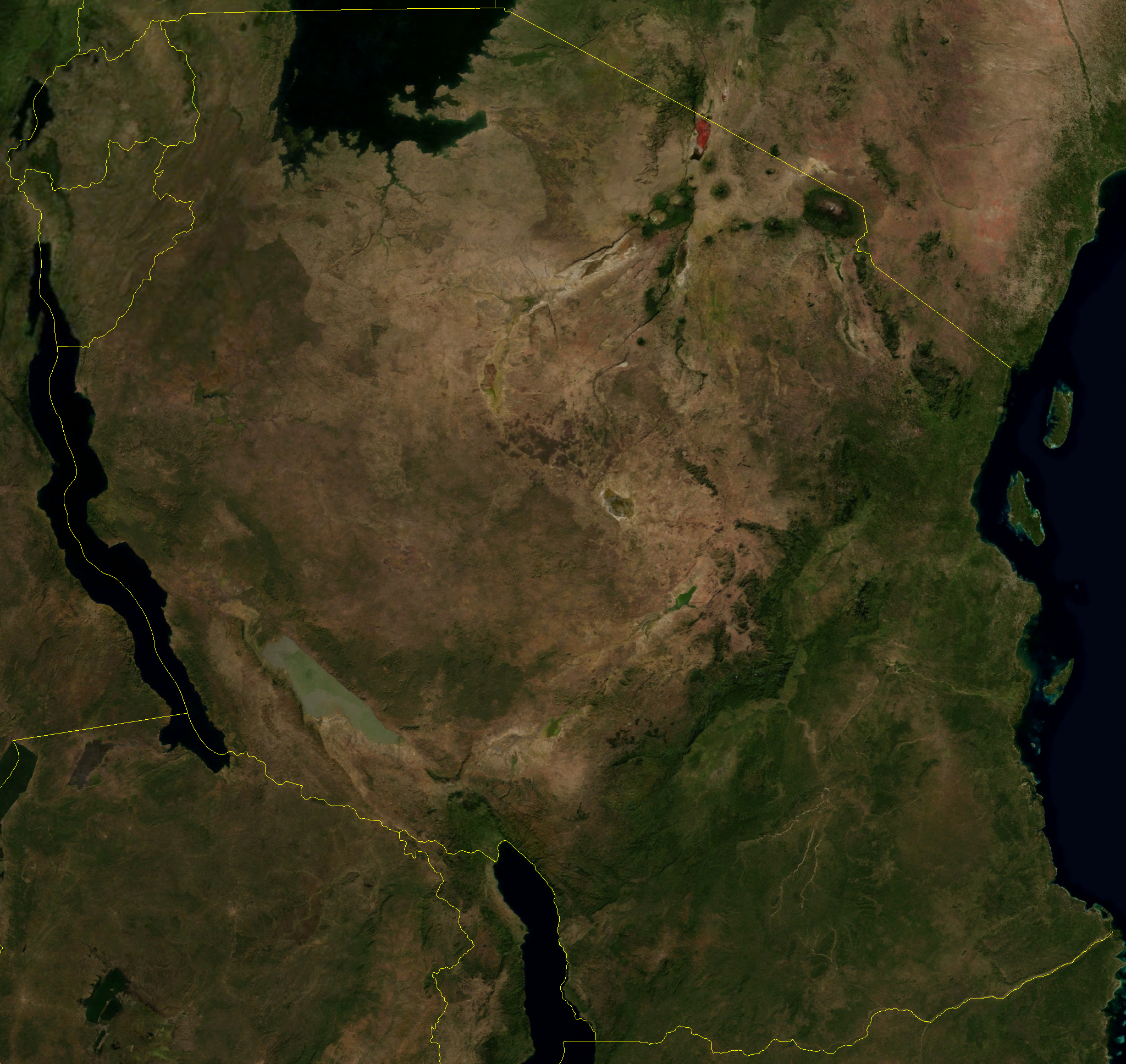
An enlargeable satellite image of Tanzania

- Climate of Tanzania
- Ecoregions in Tanzania
- Protected areas of Tanzania
  - Biosphere reserves in Tanzania
  - National parks of Tanzania
- Wildlife of Tanzania
  - Fauna of Tanzania
    - Birds of Tanzania
    - Mammals of Tanzania

==== Natural geographic features of Tanzania ====
- Glaciers of Tanzania (All located on the summit of Mount Kilimanjaro)
- Islands of Tanzania
- Lakes of Tanzania
- Mountains of Tanzania
  - Kipengere Range
  - Loleza Mountain
  - Mount Hanang
  - Mount Kilimanjaro
  - Mount Loolmalasin
  - Mount Meru
  - Nguru Mountains
  - Ol Doinyo Lengai
  - Pare Mountains
  - Poroto Mountains
  - Udzungwa Mountains
  - Usambara Mountains
  - Volcanoes in Tanzania
- Rivers of Tanzania
- World Heritage Sites in Tanzania

=== Regions of Tanzania ===
==== Ecoregions of Tanzania ====
List of ecoregions in Tanzania

- Ecoregions in Tanzania

==== Administrative divisions of Tanzania ====
Administrative divisions of Tanzania

- Regions of Tanzania
  - Districts of Tanzania

===== Regions of Tanzania =====
Regions of Tanzania

- Arusha (Arusha)
- Dar es Salaam
- Dodoma (Dodoma)
- Geita (Geita)
- Iringa (Iringa)
- Kagera (Bukoba)
- Katavi (Mpanda)
- Kigoma (Kigoma)
- Kilimanjaro (Moshi)
- Lindi (Lindi)
- Manyara (Babati)
- Mara (Musoma)
- Mbeya (Mbeya)
- Morogoro (Morogoro)
- Mtwara (Mtwara)
- Mwanza (Mwanza)
- Njombe (Njombe)
- Pemba North (Wete)
- Pemba South (Mkoani)
- Pwani (Kibaha)
- Rukwa (Sumbawanga)
- Ruvuma (Songea)
- Shinyanga (Shinyanga)
- Simiyu (Bariadi)
- Singida (Singida)
- Tabora (Tabora)
- Tanga (Tanga)
- Zanzibar Central/South (Koani)
- Zanzibar North (Mkokotoni)
- Zanzibar Urban/West (Zanzibar)

===== Districts of Tanzania =====
Districts of Tanzania

- Arumeru
- Arusha
- Karatu
- Monduli
- Ngorongoro
- Ilala
- Kinondoni
- Temeke
- Dodoma Rural
- Dodoma Urban
- Kondoa
- Kongwa
- Mpwapwa
- Iringa Rural
- Iringa Urban
- Kilolo
- Ludewa
- Makete
- Mufindi
- Njombe
- Biharamulo
- Bukoba Rural
- Bukoba Urban
- Chato
- Karagwe
- Muleba
- Ngara
- Kasulu
- Kibondo
- Hai
- Moshi Rural
- Moshi Urban
- Mwanga
- Rombo
- Same
- Kilwa
- Lindi Rural
- Lindi Urban
- Liwale
- Nachingwea
- Ruangwa
- Babati
- Hanang
- Kiteto
- Mbulu
- Simanjiro
- Bunda
- Musoma Rural
- Musoma Urban
- Serengeti
- Tarime
- Rorya
- Chunya
- Ileje
- Kyela
- Mbarali
- Mbeya Rural
- Mbeya Urban
- Mbozi
- Rungwe
- Kilombero
- Kilosa
- Morogoro Rural
- Morogoro Urban
- Mvomero
- Ulanga
- Masasi
- Mtwara Rural
- Mtwara-Mikindani District
- Nanyumbu
- Newala
- Tandahimba
- Geita
- Ilemela
- Kwimba
- Magu
- Misungwi
- Nyamagana
- Sengerema
- Ukerewe
- Wete Pemba
- Micheweni Pemba
- Mkoani
- Bagamoyo
- Kibaha
- Kisarawe
- Mafia
- Mkuranga
- Rufiji
- Mpanda
- Nkasi
- Sumbawanga Rural
- Sumbawanga Urban
- Mbinga
- Songea Rural
- Songea Urban
- Tunduru
- Bariadi
- Bukombe
- Kahama
- Kishapu
- Maswa
- Meatu
- Shinyanga Rural
- Shinyanga Urban
- Iramba
- Manyoni
- Singida Rural
- Singida Urban
- Igunga
- Nzega
- Sikonge
- Uyui
- Tabora Urban
- Urambo
- Handeni
- Kilindi
- Korogwe
- Lushoto
- Muheza
- Nkinga
- Pangani
- Tanga
- Zanzibar South
- Zanzibar North "A"
- Zanzibar North "B"
- Zanzibar Urban
- Zanzibar West

=== Demography of Tanzania ===
Demographics of Tanzania

== Government and politics of Tanzania ==
Politics of Tanzania

- Form of government: Unitary presidential republic
- Capital of Tanzania: Dodoma
- Elections in Tanzania
- Political parties in Tanzania
- Taxation in Tanzania

=== Branches of the government of Tanzania ===
==== Executive branch of the government of Tanzania ====
- Head of state: President of Tanzania, Samia Suluhu Hassan
- Head of government: Prime Minister of Tanzania, Mwigulu Nchemba
- Cabinet of Tanzania

==== Legislative branch of the government of Tanzania ====
- Parliament of Tanzania (bicameral)
  - Upper house: Senate of Tanzania
  - Lower house: House of Commons of Tanzania

==== Judicial branch of the government of Tanzania ====
Court system of Tanzania

=== Foreign relations of Tanzania ===
Foreign relations of Tanzania

- Diplomatic missions in Tanzania
- Diplomatic missions of Tanzania

==== International organization membership ====
The United Republic of Tanzania is a member of:

- African, Caribbean, and Pacific Group of States (ACP)
- African Development Bank Group (AfDB)
- African Union (AU)
- African Union/United Nations Hybrid operation in Darfur (UNAMID)
- Commonwealth of Nations
- East African Community (EAC)
- East African Development Bank (EADB)
- Food and Agriculture Organization (FAO)
- Group of 77 (G77)
- Group of Six (G6)
- International Atomic Energy Agency (IAEA)
- International Bank for Reconstruction and Development (IBRD)
- International Chamber of Commerce (ICC)
- International Civil Aviation Organization (ICAO)
- International Criminal Court (ICCt)
- International Criminal Police Organization (Interpol)
- International Development Association (IDA)
- International Federation of Red Cross and Red Crescent Societies (IFRCS)
- International Finance Corporation (IFC)
- International Fund for Agricultural Development (IFAD)
- International Labour Organization (ILO)
- International Maritime Organization (IMO)
- International Mobile Satellite Organization (IMSO)
- International Monetary Fund (IMF)
- International Olympic Committee (IOC)
- International Organization for Migration (IOM)
- International Organization for Standardization (ISO)
- International Red Cross and Red Crescent Movement (ICRM)
- International Telecommunication Union (ITU)
- International Telecommunications Satellite Organization (ITSO)
- International Trade Union Confederation (ITUC)
- Inter-Parliamentary Union (IPU)
- Multilateral Investment Guarantee Agency (MIGA)
- Nonaligned Movement (NAM)
- Organisation for the Prohibition of Chemical Weapons (OPCW)
- Southern African Development Community (SADC)
- United Nations (UN)
- United Nations Conference on Trade and Development (UNCTAD)
- United Nations Educational, Scientific, and Cultural Organization (UNESCO)
- United Nations High Commissioner for Refugees (UNHCR)
- United Nations Industrial Development Organization (UNIDO)
- United Nations Interim Force in Lebanon (UNIFIL)
- United Nations Mission in the Sudan (UNMIS)
- United Nations Operation in Cote d'Ivoire (UNOCI)
- Universal Postal Union (UPU)
- World Customs Organization (WCO)
- World Federation of Trade Unions (WFTU)
- World Health Organization (WHO)
- World Intellectual Property Organization (WIPO)
- World Meteorological Organization (WMO)
- World Tourism Organization (UNWTO)
- World Trade Organization (WTO)

=== Law and order in Tanzania ===
Law of Tanzania

- law enforcement in Tanzania
- Constitution of Tanzania
- Human rights in Tanzania
  - LGBT rights in Tanzania

=== Military of Tanzania ===
Military of Tanzania

- Command
  - Commander-in-chief:
- Forces
  - Army of Tanzania
  - Navy of Tanzania
  - Air Force of Tanzania

=== Local government in Tanzania ===
Local government in Tanzania

== History of Tanzania ==
History of Tanzania

- Current events of Tanzania

== Culture of Tanzania ==
Culture of Tanzania

- Cuisine of Tanzania
- Languages of Tanzania
- National symbols of Tanzania
  - Coat of arms of Tanzania
  - Flag of Tanzania
  - National anthem of Tanzania
- Prostitution in Tanzania
- Public holidays in Tanzania
- Religion in Tanzania
  - Christianity in Tanzania
  - Hinduism in Tanzania
  - Islam in Tanzania
  - Sikhism in Tanzania
- Tanzania Social Support Foundation
- World Heritage Sites in Tanzania

=== Art in Tanzania ===
- Music of Tanzania

=== Sports in Tanzania ===
Sports in Tanzania

- Football in Tanzania
- Tanzania at the Olympics

== Economy and infrastructure of Tanzania ==
Economy of Tanzania

- Economic rank, by nominal GDP (2007): 99th (ninety-ninth)
- Agriculture in Tanzania
- Communications in Tanzania
  - Internet in Tanzania
- Companies of Tanzania
- Currency of Tanzania: Shilling
  - ISO 4217: TZS
- Energy in Tanzania
- Health care in Tanzania
- Mining in Tanzania
- Tourism in Tanzania
- Transport in Tanzania
  - Airports in Tanzania
  - Rail transport in Tanzania
- Water supply and sanitation in Tanzania

== Education in Tanzania ==
Education in Tanzania

== See also ==
Tanzania

- List of international rankings
- List of Tanzania-related topics
- Member state of the Commonwealth of Nations
- Member state of the United Nations
- Natural resources use in Tanzania
- Outline of Africa
- Outline of geography
- Poverty in Tanzania
