= Victoria Kisyombe =

Tanzanian entrepreneur and social innovator

- Born: Mbeya, South-Western Tanzania
- Citizenship: Tanzanian
- Education: Weruweru Secondary School
- Alma mater: University of Dar es Salaam; University of Edinburgh
- Organization(s): Sero Lease and Finance Limited (Selfina)
- Known for: Founding SELFINA and pioneering micro-leasing for women in Tanzania
- Spouse: Deceased 1991
- Awards: TIAW World of Difference 100 Award, Global Leadership Award 2014, Women of Determination 2011 Award, Economic Empowerment Award 2014, Schwab Foundation Social Entrepreneur of the Year 2010

Victoria Kisyombe is a Tanzanian entrepreneur, veterinarian, and social innovator. She founded Sero Lease and Finance Limited (SELFINA) in 2002, a company that provides asset-based financing services to women without traditional collateral. The model enables clients to acquire productive assets through lease agreements, with ownership transferred upon completion of payment. She received the Schwab Foundation Social Entrepreneur of the Year Award in 2010 and the Global Leadership Award by Vital Voices in 2014.

== Background and education ==
Victoria Kisyombe was born and raised in Mbeya, Tanzania. She completed her primary and secondary education in Mbeya, then moved to Kenya, and subsequently returned to Tanzania where she enrolled at the University of Dar es Salaam and earned a bachelor's degree in Veterinary Science in 1983. She later worked as a veterinarian in Mbeya. In 1986, she received a scholarship to pursue a Master's degree in Veterinary Science at the University of Edinburgh.

In 1991, following her husband's death, Kisyombe lost access to her marital property under customary practices. She reported being unable to obtain credit due to a lack of collateral. She supported her family by selling milk from a cow she owned. This experience informed her later work in financial services for women.

== Women's financial exclusion in Tanzania ==
Tanzania's land tenure system has historically concentrated land ownership among men, leaving the majority of women unable to own property in their own names. According to the United Nations, only 12% of women in Tanzania use formal banking services. Without land titles or other tangible assets, women are systematically deemed uncreditworthy by financial institutions, trapping them in a cycle of poverty. More than 90% of Tanzanian women are unable to own property under customary laws, and over 60% of the population earn less than one US dollar per day.

== Career and innovation ==
In 1995, Kisyombe founded the Sero Business Women's Association (SEBA), providing business training and health workshops to approximately 7,000 women. Identifying capital as a primary barrier to growth, she transitioned the organization in 2002 into a for-profit social enterprise, Sero Lease and Finance Limited (SELFINA).

SELFINA utilizes a micro-leasing model where the leased equipment serves as the collateral. Clients receive productive assets and make installment payments using the income generated by those assets. Once the lease is completed, ownership of the asset transfers to the client, providing her with property for future credit use and an established credit history.

SELFINA leases a wide range of assets, including small tractors, water pumps, irrigation equipment, sewing machines, milling machines, oil extraction machines, ovens, computers, photocopiers, bicycles, motorcycles, and livestock such as dairy cows, goats, and poultry. Approximately 60% of SELFINA's clients live in rural areas, and the majority are widows or young women who would otherwise have no access to formal finance.

Kisyombe is currently a permanent member of the Schwab Foundation for Social Entrepreneurship/World Economic Forum, Emeritus Council Member of World Economic Forum New Growth Models, a Pioneer Member of the World Entrepreneurship Forum (Lyon, France), and Chairperson of the Centre for Advancement of Women in Agriculture in Tanzania (CAWAT).

== Achievements ==
As of 2024, SELFINA has:

- Financed over 31,000 women entrepreneurs
- Raised more than US$17 million in credit
- Assisted in the creation of approximately 150,000 jobs
- Loan repayment rate of approximately 95%

In response to food insecurity exacerbated by climate change, SELFINA is currently raising funds to construct silos and warehouse receipt systems to complement its core leasing programme.

== Awards and recognition ==
- 2010 — Social Entrepreneur of the Year, World Economic Forum / Schwab Foundation for Social Entrepreneurship
- 2011 — Women of Determination Award
- 2014 — Global Leadership Award, Vital Voices Global Partnership
- 2014 — Economic Empowerment Award
- TIAW World of Difference 100 Award

== See also ==
- Natural resources use in Tanzania
