= Tanzania Mini-Tiger Plan =

The Tanzania Mini-Tiger Plan is an economic plan aiming to stimulate the rapid development of a tiger economy in Tanzania through export-oriented industrialization. This plan was submitted to the Tanzanian parliament in May 2004 after a long period of negotiation between Tanzania, ADB, and assisting countries, especially the Four Asian Tigers. Tanzania was selected to be the center of this program by the think tank Japan Development Institute as it met requirements including security, political stability, millennium development programs, and numerous other factors.

The Tanzania Mini-Tiger Plan began implementation in 2005 with the following objectives:

- Agriculture development,
- Education promotion,
- Road development,
- Water supply,
- Investor outreach and other matters.

The plan is inspired by successes in other tiger countries, such as South Korea, which have seen rapid development with similar strategies.

A trial period of the plan began in Tanzania in 2005 to 2020 with the formation of special economic zones.
