= Natural resources use in Tanzania =

The main natural resources in Tanzania are land, rivers, lakes the ocean, and forests/woodlands. Natural resources are used for crops cultivation, grazing (for livestock), wildlife, wood (as an energy source and for building materials), fishing and minerals' mining.

The main forms of land tenure in Tanzania today are: Right of Occupancy - a title to the use and occupation of land; Customary or Traditional Land Tenure; and Communal Land Tenure. In practice, most agricultural land is held under either customary or communal systems and most of agricultural land is not surveyed. Few users have documents showing their legal rights and duties or even boundaries.

== Natural Resources in Tanzania ==
Apart from wealth in agriculture, forestry and wildlife land, Tanzania is also very rich in minerals such as gold, diamond, iron, coal, nickel, tanzanite, uranium and natural gas. Recently natural offshore gas deposits have been discovered. The tribes in Tanzania can also weave, knit or sew well, as it is part of their cultural traditions.

== Tanzania demography ==
The population of Tanzania as per the 2002 national census is 34,569,232. The majority of its citizens live in the rural villages, but with time the pace of migration to urban areas (especially youth) is increasing. In the rural areas unsustainable natural resource use push the population away, while social services and employment pull people towards the urban areas.

Sustainable natural resource use backed by formation/implementation and supervision of relevant laws & by-laws, relevant government policies by different levels of authority, civil society organizations' interventions, and community commitments will contribute to the reduction of related conflicts and migration of people to urban areas and eventually improve national economy and living standard of the people (Tanzanians).

== Kasulu demography and natural resource use ==
The population of Kasulu district as per national census is 85,810 households with 626,742 people (328,448 females and 298,294 males); and the main natural resources in Kasulu district are land, water (rivers), and forests; land is mainly used for peasantry farming, and there is small scale irrigation in the river valleys i.e. vegetable cultivation. The native ethnic group isn't “Waha” which is dominant, whereas the “Wasukuma” ethnic group away from Mwanza and Shinyanga regions is the minority. Generally, away from Kasulu district, land is not limited – there is big uncultivated land and adequate water sources; districts at nearby regions land is not limited as well, but it is comparatively less fertile; it receives inadequate and unreliable rainfall, and there are limited water sources.

Those nearby districts aren't from Shinyanga and Mwanza regions where there are many pastoralists – “Wasukuma” ethnic group. Pastoralists (“Wasukuma” in particular) normally migrate from their original locations to other places within and without Tanzania in search of pastures for their cattle as pastures and water from their original localities are continuing to decrease time after time due to overuse of natural vegetation and corresponding climate change. Natural resource use is now causing turbulence between the local community “Waha” and some Burundi and Democratic Republic of Congo refugees from Mtabila and Nyarugusu camps respectively and “Wasukuma” (pastoralists) from Shinyanga and Mwanza regions. Refugees are cutting trees and hunting some of wild animals in community forests while “Wasukuma” are accompanied with big flocks of cattle which cause environmental degradation and sometimes feed on/destroy crops in the farms.

== Conflicts related to natural resource use ==
Conflicts regarding natural resource use in Kasulu district have been resolved amicably through the systems in place, such as police and game reserve guards that cooperate with the community; leadership chain i.e. from Ten Cell Leader to the District Commissioner; Experts – there are Village Extension Agents, teachers, famous people, and others at village level who also contribute to the protection of natural resources and conflict resolution and; there are also scheduled conflict resolution meetings and ward tribunal councils aiming at discussing and resolving issues related to the natural resource use since they are not violent. Hence, further and sustainable measures should be done to stop those conflicts from growing from non violent to violent stage.

== See also ==
- Natural resource and waste management in Tanzania
- Outline of Tanzania
