= Natural resource and waste management in Tanzania =

Tanzania, officially known as the United Republic of Tanzania, is a mid-sized country in southeastern Africa bordering the Indian Ocean. It is home to a population of about 43.1 million people. Since gaining its independence from the United Kingdom in 1961, Tanzania has been continuously developing in terms of its economy and modern industry. However, the country’s economic success has been limited. Environmental obstacles, such as the mismanagement of natural resources and industrial waste, have been contributing factors and results of the relatively low economic status of the country. Tanzania’s annual output still falls below the average world GDP. In 2010, the GDP for Tanzania was US $23.3 billion and the GDP per capita was US $1,515. Comparatively, the GDP for the United States was $15.1 trillion and the GDP per capita was approximately $47,153. Eighty percent of the workers accounting for this annual output in Tanzania work in agriculture, while the remaining 20% work in industry, commerce, and government organizations. Such a heavy reliance on agriculture has placed a huge amount of strain on an already limited supply of viable land.

== Land use and degradation ==
Land in Tanzania is a valuable resource. Since most of the country is dry and arid, the wetlands surrounding Lake Victoria are the most fertile and consequently, in high demand for farming. The results have shown that these wetlands are indeed very productive ecosystems, rich in nutrients and capable of sustaining crop growth.

Land degradation is one of the leading environmental problems resulting from a mostly agricultural nation. Tanzania among other states in southern Africa is being adversely affected by inappropriate farming methods and overgrazing. Most of the eastern region of Africa, of which Tanzania is a significant part, gets less than 600 mm of rainfall each year. Regions with an average rainfall of 500–1000 mm are classified as semiarid climates.

There are many economic benefits for raising livestock in developing countries. Typically, the monetary value for raising cattle and other associated animals is higher than the income potential from producing crops. Additionally, less manual labor is involved. Producing crops such as wheat, beans, and grains generates more food for large populations than does raising livestock. These vegetative food sources can be made to feed a much larger group of people than slaughtering individual animals. Suggestions for increased integration of crop and livestock production have been put forth in an attempt to maintain a balance between the two methods.

A different, possibly viable, solution has also been proposed: sustainable agriculture. The concept of sustainable agriculture is one that is not fully understood throughout the world and has many definitions. These can range from the idea of producing strictly organic crops to instituting fertilizing practices which better the environment rather than deplete it. The desire for economic success is important, yet the heavy use of pesticides and chemical fertilizers in raising crops and livestock is not eco-friendly. Conventional farming’s heavy reliance on chemicals is believed to produce a much higher overall output than alternative farming methods. The crops produced would be less exposed to chemical toxins and better able to feed the human population.

== Effects on human health ==
Research has shown that many parts of the world affected by land degradation and human interference are experiencing much higher rates of infectious disease. As land degradation increases across the globe, the status of human health is affected by the changing ecological systems that play host to various pathogens. By incorporating sustainable living practices into daily life, many forerunners of biological disease can be avoided, thus preventing instances of epidemics or premature death. These include the contraction of tetanus from spores found in soil and water-related diseases caused by agricultural runoff contaminants.

== Management of toxic chemicals ==
Another growing problem in Tanzania is the stems from the mismanagement of chemical resources. An increasing number of studies have been done on the levels of toxic substances in the soil, water systems, and atmosphere of the region. For instance, one of Tanzania’s main exports is gold, the mining of which requires excess amounts of mercury. It has been estimated that approximately 1.32 kg of mercury is lost to the environment for every 1 kg of gold mined. The unregulated use of mercury in the mines has led to high quantities of the element being released into the atmosphere, exposing the miners to harmful toxins. Using a mercury detector test, each subject’s hair was examined to detect traces of the chemical. Fourteen of the subjects had extremely high readings, the highest being 953 ppm. On average, the mercury level found in these 14 subjects was 48.3 ppm per person. Keeping this information in context, the value considered critical for Minamata disease is 50 ppm. The expected exposure level for a typical person is about 10 ppm. The remaining 258 participants had levels at roughly 10 ppm suggesting no increase in mercury exposure.

The reasoning behind choosing miners as test subjects is clear. The gold mines release an enormous amount of mercury on a daily basis. Approximately 60% of the total generated mercury is released in a gaseous form and exposes the miners via inhalation or absorption through the skin. Fishermen, their families, and residents of Mwanza City were also test subjects to exhibit the far-reaching effects of the remaining 40% of the mercury released from the mines.

In addition to testing for mercury contamination, studies have been conducted in Tanzania to test for levels of pesticides in the environment. The bodies of water accompanying the farms and plantations tested positive for both DDT and HCH (two common insecticides) .They provide a feasible method to increase crop yield which is important for economic success regardless of environmental impact. While the agricultural areas did not show intense pollution, the former pesticide storage site contained residue levels that were considerably greater. Approximately 40% of the site’s surrounding soil was saturated with pesticides.

While evidence from the previous case study does not indicate hazardous agricultural practices, a second study was conducted testing the toxicity of soil used in the farming of maize. This research focused on determining levels of the potentially toxic elements (PTEs) arsenic, lead, chromium, and nickel. Samples were taken from 40 farms throughout the country and toxic levels of these elements were found in several samples from different farms. The likely causes of this increase in toxins are increased use of pesticides, mining, and improper waste disposal. Crops that are high in lead and nickel are seen as unfit for human consumption which could pose a potential health risk in Tanzanian people. While it is true that PTEs pollute crops, they also inhibit the soil from taking up nutrients which further reduces the overall yield.

== Water management and sanitation ==
In addition to soil contamination and general land degradation, Tanzania has a long history of water mismanagement. Inherently, water management is a complex process in that it involves the authority of many people from different sectors of governing bodies.

== Management of solid waste ==
Waste management, like natural and chemical resource management, is continuously evolving in developing countries including Tanzania. The country's profile in Waste Atlas Platform shows that currently (2012) 16.9 million tonnes of MSW or 365 kg/cap/year are produced. The current practice of solid waste disposal is to simply remove it from cities and other metropolitan areas and dump it in rural or deserted areas to be forgotten. Solid waste is defined as any solid, discarded material generated by municipal, industrial, or agricultural practices. Over the past 30 years, urban areas such as Dar es Salaam have grown both in terms of population and physical size. In Dar es Salaam, the largest city in Tanzania, residents generate approximately 0.31 kg of waste per capita. In comparison, residents of squatter areas – rural regions between cities – produce only 0.17 kg per capita on average.

Although there are not many immediate health risks correlated with dumping solid wastes such as paper and plastic, there are potential hazards associated the improper disposal of medical and other toxic waste from hospitals. While Tanzania has made efforts to further develop its urban centers by allowing private hospitals, there has been a lack of infrastructure generated to accommodate the growing amounts of bio-hazardous waste. Currently, the more dangerous medical wastes are simply mixed with municipal solid waste and dumped at the disposal sites discussed above. Tanzania is undergoing changes in making a comprehensive, functioning waste disposal system a pre-requisite for the development of new hospitals.

== Future solutions ==
It is especially crucial for developing nations, such as Tanzania, to develop sound infrastructure in order to progress toward complete development. More specifically, Tanzania is under to pressure to either significantly reduce the amount of waste generated or develop a sustainable plan for disposing of the waste without environmental repercussions. Ideally, the final solution will involve both.

Additionally, progressive research is being conducted on converting solid waste into usable energy. Since waste is continually being generated, inventing a method for converting such waste into a usable resource would supply essentially limitless energy. Furthermore, if the program is successful, overall waste will be reduced and an efficient method of disposal will be in place. In fact, researchers in the field have predicted that waste could be reduced by 50-60% with the success of such a program. An organization called the Taka Gas Project has been researching methods for converting solid waste into biogas to be used for generating electrical energy. The biogas will be created using anaerobic digestion of organic materials (most of the waste is organic).

== Bibliography ==
- Collins, A.E. 2001 Health Ecology, Land Degradation and Development. Land Degradation & Development 12: 237-250.
- Dahlberg, Annika. 1994 Contesting Views and Changing Paradigms: The Land Degradation Debate in Southern Africa. Uppsala: Reprocentralen HSC.
- Ellis, Jim and Kathleen A. Galvin. 1994 Climate Patterns and Land Use Practices in the Dry Zones of Africa. BioScience 44(5): 340-349.
- Harada, Masazumi, et al. 1999 Monitoring of mercury pollution in Tanzania: relation between head hair mercury and health. Science of the Total Environment 227(2-3): 249-256.
- Hongo, H and M. Masikini. 2003 Impact of immigrant pastoral herds to fringing wetlands of lake Victoria in Magu district Mwanza region, Tanzania. Physics and Chemistry of the Earth, Parts A/B/C 28(20-27): 1001-1007.
- Kaseva, M.E. and S.K. Gupta. 1999 Recycling — an environmentally friendly and income generating activity towards sustainable solid waste management. Case study — Dar es Salaam City, Tanzania. Resources, Conservation and Recycling 17(4): 299-309.
- Kishimba, M.A., L. Henry, H. Mwevura, A.J Mmochi, M. Mihale, and H. Hellar. 2004 The status of pesticide pollution in Tanzania. Talanta 64(1): 48-53.
- Marwa, Ernest M.M., Andrew A. Meharg, and Clive M. Rice. 2011 Risk assessment of potentially toxic elements in agricultural soils and maize tissues from selected districts in Tanzania. Science of the Total Environment 416: 180-186.
- Mato, R.R.A.M and G.R. Kassenga. 1998 A study on problems of management of medical solid wastes in Dar es Salaam and their remedial measures. Resources, Conservation, and Recycling 21(1): 1-16.
- Mbuligwe, Stephen E. and Gabriel R. Kassenga. 2004 Feasibility and strategies for anaerobic digestion of solid waste for energy production in Dar es Salaam city, Tanzania. Resources, Conservation and Recycling 42(2): 183-203.
- Schaller, Neill. 2003 The concept of agricultural sustainability. Agriculture, Ecosystems & Environment 46(1-4): 89-97.
- Stein, C., H. Ernstson, and J. Barron. 2011 A social network approach to analyzing water governance: The case of the Mkindo catchment, Tanzania.
- Yhdego, Michael. 1999 Urban solid waste management in Tanzania Issues, concepts and challenges. Resources, Conservation and Recycling 14(1): 1-10.
- U.S. Department of State: Background Note: Tanzania.
