= Tanzania Revenue Authority =

Government agency of Tanzania

- Mamlaka ya Mapato Tanzania (Swahili)

Government agency overview
- Formed: 1995
- Jurisdiction: Tanzania
- Headquarters: Dar es salaam
- Motto: Together we build our nation
- Employees: 7,000
- Minister responsible: Hon Mwigulu L. Nchemba, Minister of Finance
- Government agency executive: Yusuph Mwenda, Commissioner General
- Key document: Tanzania Revenue Authority Act, 1995
- Website: www.tra.go.tz

The Tanzania Revenue Authority (TRA) is a semi-autonomous government agency of the United Republic of Tanzania. It was established by the Tanzania Revenue Authority Act, CAP. 339 in 1995 and started its operations on the 1st of July 1996. It is headed by the Commissioner General. The Current Commissioner General is Yusuph Mwenda.

In carrying out its statutory functions, TRA is responsible for, among others, to administer and give effect to the laws or the specified provisions of the laws set out in the First Schedule to said Act, and for that purpose, TRA undertakes to assess, collect, and account for all revenue to which those laws apply, on behalf of the Government. Other specific functions of TRA include the following:

1. To monitor, oversee, coordinate activities and ensure the fair, efficient and effective administration of revenue laws by the Revenue Department in the jurisdiction of the Union Government.
2. To monitor and ensure the collection of fees, levies, charges, or any other tax collected by any Ministry, Department or Division of the Government as revenue for the Government.
3. To advise the Minister and other relevant organs on all matters pertaining to fiscal policy, the implementation of the Policy, and the constant improvement of policy regarding revenue laws and administration.
4. To promote voluntary tax compliance to the highest degree possible.
5. To take such measures as may be necessary to improve the standard of service given to Taxpayers with a view to improving the effectiveness of the revenue Departments and maximizing revenue collection.
6. To determine the steps to be taken to counteract fraud and other forms of tax and another fiscal evasion.
7. To produce trade statistics and publications on a quarterly basis.

Taxes and charges administered and collected by Authority are Income Taxes that include, Corporate Tax, Individuals, Pay As You Earn (PAYE), Skills Development Levy (SDL), and other Withholding Taxes, Value Added Tax (VAT), Import Duty, Excise Duty, Stamp Duty, Airport Service Charge, Port Service Charge, Motor Vehicle Registration, and Transfer Tax, Property Rate, Fuel Levy, Petroleum Levy, Tourism Development Levy, Railway Development Levy, and Motor Vehicle Driving License Fee. The current chairperson of the TRA Board of Directors is Uledi Mussa Abbas. Offices of the TRA are located in Dar es Salaam. In February 2026, the Minister of Finance Khamis Mussa Omar handed over 72 vehicles from Ministry of Finance and Planning to TRA to improve service delivery throughout the nation. The cars are meant to increase taxpayer accessibility, increase revenue collection, and fortify public services.

== See also ==
- Economy of Tanzania
- Government of Tanzania
- Taxation in Tanzania
