= Tanzania and the World Bank =

World Bank interactions with Tanzania

Map of Tanzania's Natural Resources

The World Bank Group (WBG) provides grants, credits and policy analysis to support economic development in Tanzania with a focus on infrastructure and private sector growth. As of 2018, WBG supports 25 active projects with funding of more than $3.95 billion. The WBG provides analytical and technical assistance in coordination with these projects. From 2007-2018 Tanzania maintained real GDP growth averaging 6.8% a year. Growth concentrated in the agricultural and transportation sectors. Complementing this growth, the poverty rate in Tanzania fell from 28.2% in 2012 to 26.9% in 2016. Debate exists over the validity of this growth as development may be unevenly dispersed among different geographic and income groups.

== Strategy ==
The World Bank's 2017 Systematic Country Diagnostic Report identified multiple development barriers. These challenges include slow growth in per capita income, access to quality services, pervasive gender disparities, water depletion and weak governance of natural resources.

The report identifies climate change as possibly leading to changes in rain patterns and rising sea levels, particularly affecting energy and agriculture. The World Bank's Country Partnership Framework 2018-2022 targeted three areas for improvement;

- structural transformation to leverage Tanzania natural assets and capitalize on its comparative advantage to create new jobs;
- spatial transformation to build on the country's geographic advantage and maximize benefits from spatial integration and agglomeration;
- improving public infrastructure by expanding human capital, gender equity and macroeconomic stability.

== Strategic partnerships ==
=== International Development Association ===
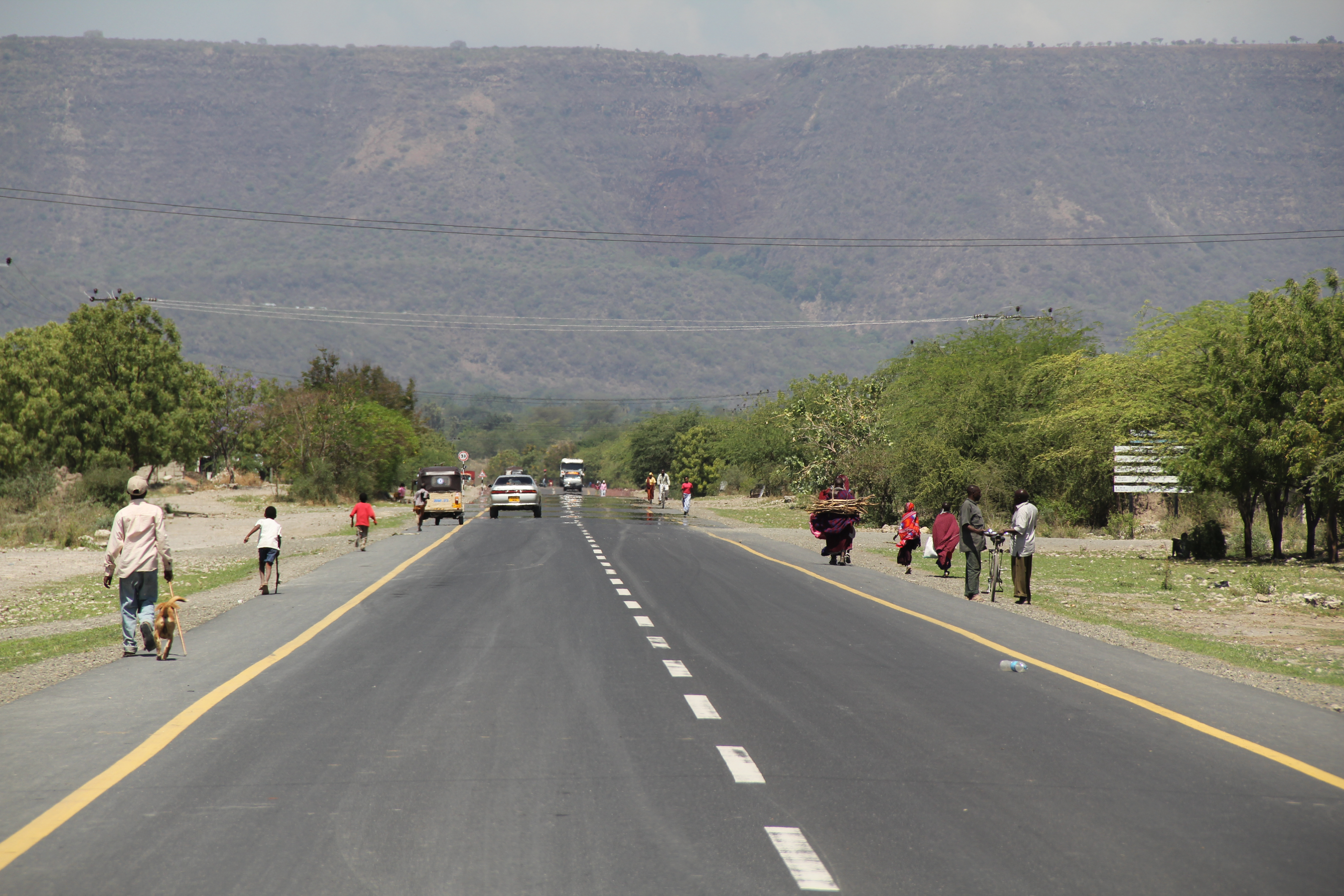
Highway in Tanzania

The International Development Association (IDA) offers concessional loans and grants to developing countries. IDA funds 24 projects in key sectors of the Tanzanian economy including transport (28%), social development (22%), energy (9%), education (8%), social protection (9%), water sanitation (5%). IDA commits approximately $393 million to Tanzanian participation in five regional projects. In 2017, the IDA provided a $225 million concession credit for the development of an interchange in Dar es Salaam to ease transportation bottlenecks and aid local businesses. IDA supports projects that benefit government processes. In 2006, the IDA assisted in the development of the Tax Modernization Project with the goal of improving the country's tax infrastructure and providing educational programs to tax administrators and taxpayers.

=== International Finance Corporation ===
The International Financial Corporation (IFC) offers investment, advisory and asset management services to developing countries. IFC supports infrastructure projects in the power, oil, and telecommunication sectors. In 2016, IFC released a web portal to improve the rate at which mini grids are developed in order to support small-renewable power producers. IFC aims to bolster developing financial markets by increasing the availability of financing for micro, small and medium-size enterprises. In 2013, IFC provided a loan of $3 million to FINCA Tanzania, a micro-finance institute, to expand micro financial services with a focus on women, young people and rural populations.
