= Economy of Tanzania =

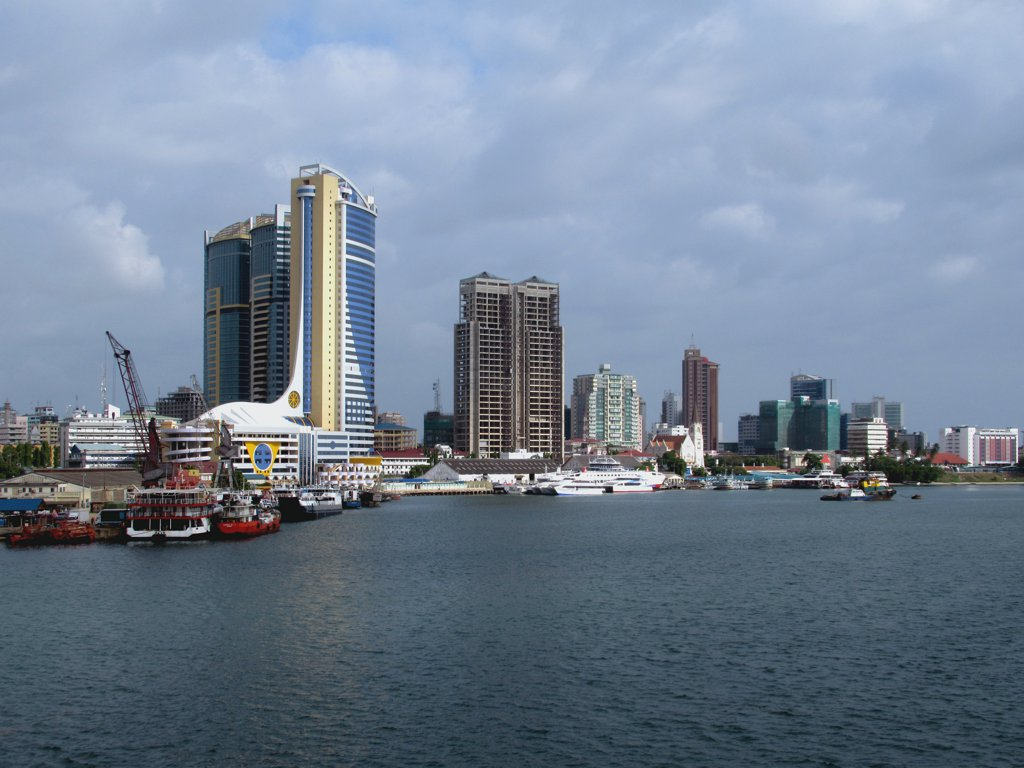
- Dar es Salaam, the financial centre of Tanzania
- Currency: Tanzanian shilling (TSh)
- Fiscal year: 1 July – 30 June
- Trade organisations: AU, AfCFTA (signed), EAC, SADC, WTO
- Country group: Least developed; Lower-middle income economy

Statistics
- Population: ▲72,995,550 (2025)
- GDP: ▲$94.89 billion (nominal; 2026); ▲$320.88 billion (PPP; 2026)
- GDP rank: 82st (nominal; 2026); 67th (PPP; 2026)
- GDP growth: ▲5.9% (2025); ▲5.9% (2026); ▲6.1% (2027)
- GDP per capita: ▲$1,362 (nominal; 2026); ▲$4,607 (PPP; 2026)
- GDP per capita rank: 168th (nominal; 2026); 161th (PPP; 2026)
- GDP per capita growth: 2.6% (2024)
- GDP by sector: agriculture (23.4%); industrial (28.7%); services (28.4%) (2024 estimate)* (2024 est.)}}
- Inflation (CPI): ▲4.0% (2026 est.)
- Base borrowing rate: 12% (2014)
- Population below national poverty line: 26.4% (2018); 76.6% on less than $3.20/day (2017)
- Gini coefficient: 40.5 medium (2017)
- Human Development Index: ▲0.555 Medium (2023) (165th); ▲0.391 low IHDI (2023)
- Labour force: ▲30,643,514 (2022); ▲82.2% employment rate (2014)
- Labour force by occupation: Agriculture: 50%
- Unemployment: 2.6% (2024)* }}
- Informal employment: 89% (2024)
- Main industries: agricultural processing (sugar, beer, cigarettes, sisal twine); mining (diamonds, gold, and iron), salt, soda ash; cement, oil refining, shoes, apparel, wood products, fertilizer

External
- Exports: ▲$5.6685 billion (105th; October 2015)
- Export goods: gold, tobacco, cashews, sesame seeds, refined petroleum
- Main export partners: India 27% United Arab Emirates 11% South Africa 9% Kenya 5% Rwanda 5% (2022)
- Imports: ▼$10.441 billion (FOB; October 2015)
- Import goods: refined petroleum, palm oil, packaged medicines, cars, wheat
- Main import partners: China 30% India 18% United Arab Emirates 11% Democratic Republic of the Congo 5% Saudi Arabia 2% (2022)
- FDI stock: $12.715 billion (2013)
- Current account: –4.002 billion (October 2015)
- Gross external debt: $15.4 billion (October 2015)

Public finance
- Government debt: ▼37% of GDP (2017 est.)
- Foreign reserves: $4,383.6 million (4.5 months of imports; 2013)
- Budget balance: –1.8% (of GDP) (2017 est.)
- Revenue: $12.88 billion (2022 est.)
- Spending: $14.91 billion (2022 est.)
- Economic aid: $490 million (recipient; 2014)
- Credit rating: B+ (Fitch; 2024)
- All values, unless otherwise stated, are in US dollars.

Tanzania has a developing economy considered lower-middle income. It is centered around manufacturing, tourism, agriculture, and financial services. Tanzania's economy has been transitioning from a planned economy to a market economy since 1985. Although the total GDP has increased since these reforms began, GDP per capita dropped sharply at first, and only exceeded the pre-transition figure in around 2007.

The value of Tanzania's GDP at current prices reached USD 174.7 billion in 2022. Tanzania has the 2nd largest economy in East Africa after Kenya, and the 7th largest in Sub-Saharan Africa.

It has sustained relatively high economic growth compared to global trends, as is characteristic of African nations. According to World Bank data, the last 5 years have seen the slowest growth since 2000. The medium-term outlook is so far positive, with growth projected at 8 percent in 2020/21, which is supported by large infrastructure spending.

On 7 September 2021, the IMF approved US$567.25 million in emergency financial assistance to support Tanzania’s efforts in responding to the COVID-19 pandemic by addressing the urgent health, humanitarian, and economic costs.

== History ==
Significant measures have been taken to liberalize the Tanzanian economy along market lines and encourage both foreign and domestic private investment. Beginning in 1986, the Government of Tanzania embarked on an adjustment program to dismantle the socialist (Ujamaa) economic controls and encourage more active participation of the private sector in the economy. The program included a comprehensive package of policies which reduced the budget deficit and improved monetary control, substantially depreciated the overvalued exchange rate, liberalized the trade regime, removed most price controls, eased restrictions on the marketing of food crops, freed interest rates, and initiated a restructuring of the financial sector. Tanzania accepted austerity measures required by the International Monetary Fund (IMF) and World Bank-imposed structural adjustment policies.

Current GDP per capita of Tanzania grew more than 40 percent between 1998 and 2007. In May 2009, the IMF approved an Exogenous Shock Facility for Tanzania to help the country cope with the global economic crisis Tanzania is also engaged in a Policy Support Instrument (PSI) with the IMF, which commenced in February 2007 after Tanzania completed its second three-year Poverty Reduction and Growth Facility (PRGF), the first having been completed in August 2003. The PRGF was the successor program to the Enhanced Structural Adjustment Facility, which Tanzania also participated in from 1996 to 1999. The IMF's PSI program provides policy support and signaling to participating low-income countries and is intended for countries that have usually achieved a reasonable growth performance, low underlying inflation, an adequate level of official international reserves, and have begun to establish external and net domestic debt sustainability.

Tanzania also embarked on a major restructuring of state-owned enterprises. The program has so far divested 335 out of some 425 parastatal entities. Overall, real economic growth has averaged about 4 percent a year, much better than the previous 20 years, but not enough to improve the lives of average Tanzanians. Also, the economy remains overwhelmingly donor-dependent. Moreover, Tanzania has an external debt of $7.9 billion. The servicing of this debt absorbs about 40 percent of total government expenditures. Tanzania has qualified for debt relief under the enhanced Heavily Indebted Poor Countries (HIPC) initiative. Debts worth over $6 billion were canceled following implementation of the Paris Club 7 Agreement.

== Macro-economic trend ==
Historical development of real GDP per capita in Tanzania, since 1950

This is a chart of trend of gross domestic product of Tanzania at market prices estimated by the International Monetary Fund with figures in millions of shillings.

Year	Gross Domestic Product	US Dollar Exchange rate	Derived GDP ($m)
1980	45,749	8/21	5,572
1985	115,006	17/87	6,436
1990	830,693	195/04	4,259
1995	3,020,501	536/40	5,631
2000	7,267,133	800/43	9,079
2005	13,713,477	1,127/10	12,167
2010	–	1,515/10	—

As of 2025, the mean urban wage in Tanzania was estimated to be TZS 494,812 ($189), whereas the mean rural wage was estimated at TZS 367,034 ($140); both of these were a small increase from respectively TZS 425,608 and 317,779 in 2020. In July 2025, the minimum wage for public officials was raised from TZS 370,000 to TZS 500,000.

Tanzania has a substantial degree of inequality. According to the WID, the top 1% of Tanzanians gained 17.90% of the total income in 2023, whereas the bottom 50% gained 14.10%. The most recent Gini coefficient (for the year 2018) is 40.5.

The economy saw a GDP growth of 5.5% in 2024. Except for a low point of 2% in 2020, the growth varied between 4.5% and 7.7% for every year since 1999.

The following table shows the main economic indicators in 1980–2026. Inflation below 5% is in green.

Year	GDP (in billion US$ PPP)	GDP per capita (in US$ PPP)	GDP (in billion US$ nominal)	GDP growth (real)	Inflation rate (in Percent)	Government debt (in % of GDP)
1980	9.1	495	10.9	▲3.3%	▲30.2%	n/a
1981	▲10.0	▲529	▲13.0	▲0.5%	▲25.7%	n/a
1982	▲10.7	▲548	▲14.9	▲0.6%	▲28.9%	n/a
1983	▲11.4	▲565	▲15.3	▲2.4%	▲27.1%	n/a
1984	▲12.2	▲585	▼13.9	▲3.4%	▲36.1%	n/a
1985	▲13.2	▲612	▼12.6	▲4.6%	▲33.3%	n/a
1986	▲14.3	▲643	▲15.9	▲6.6%	▲32.4%	n/a
1987	▲15.5	▲676	▼7.8	▲5.9%	▲29.9%	n/a
1988	▲16.8	▲707	▼7.5	▲4.4%	▲31.2%	n/a
1989	▲18.1	▲742	▼6.4	▲3.8%	▲25.8%	n/a
1990	▲20.1	▲803	▼5.2	▲7.0%	▲36.4%	n/a
1991	▲21.2	▲825	▲6.0	▲2.1%	▲25.2%	n/a
1992	▲21.8	▲828	▼5.6	▲0.6%	▲20.7%	n/a
1993	▲22.6	▲837	▼5.2	▲1.2%	▲26.1%	n/a
1994	▲23.5	▼836	▲5.5	▲1.6%	▲37.9%	n/a
1995	▲24.8	▲850	▲6.4	▲3.6%	▲26.8%	n/a
1996	▲26.4	▲884	▲7.9	▲4.5%	▲21.0%	n/a
1997	▲27.8	▲919	▲9.3	▲3.5%	▲16.1%	n/a
1998	▲29.2	▲938	▲11.5	▲3.7%	▲12.8%	n/a
1999	▲31.0	▲973	▲11.8	▲4.8%	▲7.9%	n/a
2000	▲33.3	▲1,015	▲12.4	▲4.9%	▲6.0%	n/a
2001	▲36.1	▲1,069	▲12.6	▲6.0%	▲5.1%	50.8%
2002	▲39.3	▲1,134	▲13.1	▲7.2%	▲4.6%	▼47.4%
2003	▲42.8	▲1,204	▲14.2	▲6.9%	▲4.4%	▼44.4%
2004	▲47.4	▲1,298	▲15.6	▲7.8%	▲4.1%	▲44.5%
2005	▲52.5	▲1,398	▲17.2	▲7.4%	▲4.4%	▼25.4%
2006	▲56.6	▲1,467	▲18.9	▲4.7%	▲7.3%	▼17.4%
2007	▲63.1	▲1,589	▲21.8	▲8.5%	▲7.0%	▲23.8%
2008	▲67.9	▲1,664	▲27.8	▲5.6%	▲10.3%	▼21.6%
2009	▲72.0	▲1,718	▲29.3	▲5.4%	▲12.1%	▲23.9%
2010	▲77.5	▲1,808	▲31.9	▲6.4%	▲7.2%	▲27.6%
2011	▲85.3	▲1,936	▲34.4	▲7.9%	▲12.7%	▲28.4%
2012	▲91.4	▲2,016	▲39.7	▲5.1%	▲16.0%	▲30.0%
2013	▲99.2	▲2,126	▲45.7	▲6.8%	▲7.9%	▲32.7%
2014	▲107.8	▲2,238	▲50.0	▲6.7%	▲6.1%	▲36.4%
2015	▲115.5	▲2,326	▼47.4	▲6.2%	▲5.6%	▲39.5%
2016	▲124.6	▲2,424	▲49.8	▲6.9%	▲5.2%	▲39.8%
2017	▲135.3	▲2,546	▲54.0	▲6.7%	▲5.3%	▲40.1%
2018	▲146.0	▲2,659	▲54.8	▲7.0%	▲3.5%	▲42.0%
2019	▲164.9	▲2,913	▲58.8	▲6.9%	▲3.4%	▼40.4%
2020	▲186.6	▲3,201	▲63.4	▲4.5%	▲3.3%	▲41.3%
2021	▲204.7	▲3,408	▲68.0	▲4.8%	▲3.7%	▲43.4%
2022	▲229.5	▲3,709	▲74.2	▲4.7%	▲4.4%	▲44.9%
2023	▲250.2	▲3,926	▲78.4	▲5.1%	▲3.8%	▲47.8%
2024	▲270.4	▲4,120	▲79.2	▲5.5%	▲3.1%	▲49.9%
2025	▲294.5	▲4,355	▲87.3	▲5.9%	▲3.3%	▼49.7%
2026	▲320.9	▲4,607	▲94.9	▲5.9%	▲4.0%	▼48.7%

== Agriculture ==
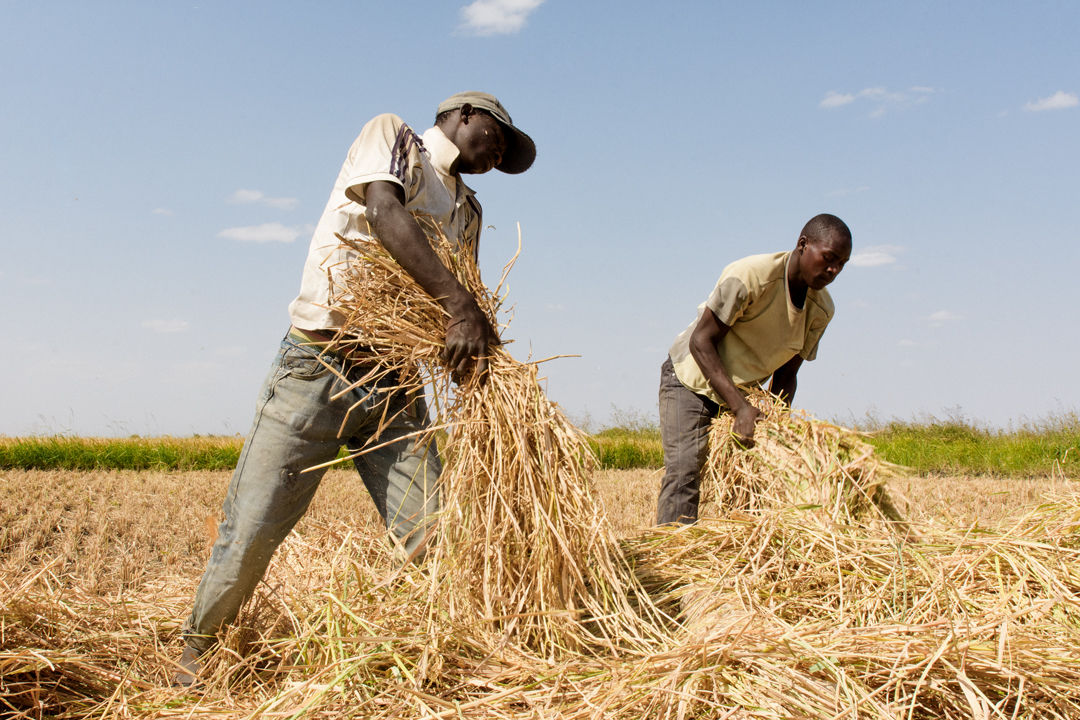
Farmers clearing a rice field manually

The Tanzanian economy is heavily based on agriculture, which accounts for 28.7 percent of gross domestic product, provides 85 percent of exports, and accounts for half of the employed workforce; The agricultural sector grew 4.3 percent in 2012, less than half of the Millennium Development Goal target of 10.8 percent. 16.4 percent of the land is arable, with 2.4 percent of the land planted with permanent crops.

This strong dependence on agriculture, makes Tanzania's economy highly vulnerable to weather shocks and fluctuating commodity prices. 76% of Tanzania's population subsist thanks to agriculture and, due to the lack of knowledge and infrastructure to develop and implement some kind of agricultural technology, any droughts, floods, or temperature shocks can severely damage the living standards of those people and create huge increases in unemployment, hunger, and malnutrition rates, as well as, in really severe case, mortality rates due to starvation.

Tanzania produced in 2018:

- 5.9 million tons of maize;
- 5 million tons of cassava (12th largest producer in the world);
- 3.8 million tons of sweet potato (4th largest producer in the world, second only to China, Malawi and Nigeria);
- 3.4 million tons of banana (10th largest producer in the world, 13th adding plantain production);
- 3 million tons of rice;
- 3 million tons of sugarcane;
- 1.7 million tons of potato;
- 1.2 million tons of beans (6th largest producer in the world);
- 940 thousand tons of peanut (7th largest producer in the world);
- 930 thousand tons of sunflower seed (12th largest producer in the world);
- 808 thousand tons of sorghum;
- 561 thousand tons of sesame seed (5th largest producer in the world, losing only to Sudan, Myanmar, India and Nigeria);
- 546 thousand tons of coconut (11th largest producer in the world);
- 454 thousand tons of mango (including mangosteen and guava);
- 389 thousand tons of pineapple;
- 373 thousand tons of orange;
- 356 thousand tons of tomato;
- 238 thousand tons of cotton;
- 171 thousand tons of cashew nuts (6th largest producer in the world);

In addition to smaller productions of other agricultural products, like tobacco (107 thousand tons, 8th largest producer in the world), coffee (55 thousand tons), tea (36 thousand tons) and sisal (33 thousand tons).

== Industry ==
Industries are a major and growing component of the Tanzanian economy, contributing 22.2 percent of GDP in 2013. This component includes mining and quarrying, manufacturing, electricity and natural gas, water supply, and construction.

=== Mining ===
Mining contributed 3.3 percent of GDP in 2013. The vast majority of the country's mineral export revenue comes from gold, accounting for 89 percent of the value of those exports in 2013. It also exports sizable quantities of gemstones, including diamonds and tanzanite. All of Tanzania's coal production, which totalled 106,000 short tons in 2012, is used domestically.

==== Minerals ====
Other minerals exploited in Tanzania include;

1. Pozzolana
2. Salt
3. Gypsum
4. Kaolinite
5. Silver ore
6. Copper
7. Phosphate
8. Tanzanite
9. Tin
10. Graphite
11. Bauxite.

Modern gold mining in Tanzania started in the German colonial period, beginning with gold discoveries near Lake Victoria in 1894. The first gold mine in what was then Tanganyika, the Sekenke Gold Mine, began operation in 1909, and gold mining in Tanzania experienced a boom between 1930 and World War II. By 1967, gold production in the country had dropped to insignificance but was revived in the mid-1970s, when the gold price rose once more. In the late 1990s, foreign mining companies started investing in the exploration and development of gold deposits in Tanzania, leading to the opening of a number of new mines, like the Golden Pride mine, which opened in 1999 as the first modern gold mine in the country, or the Buzwagi mine, which opened in 2009.

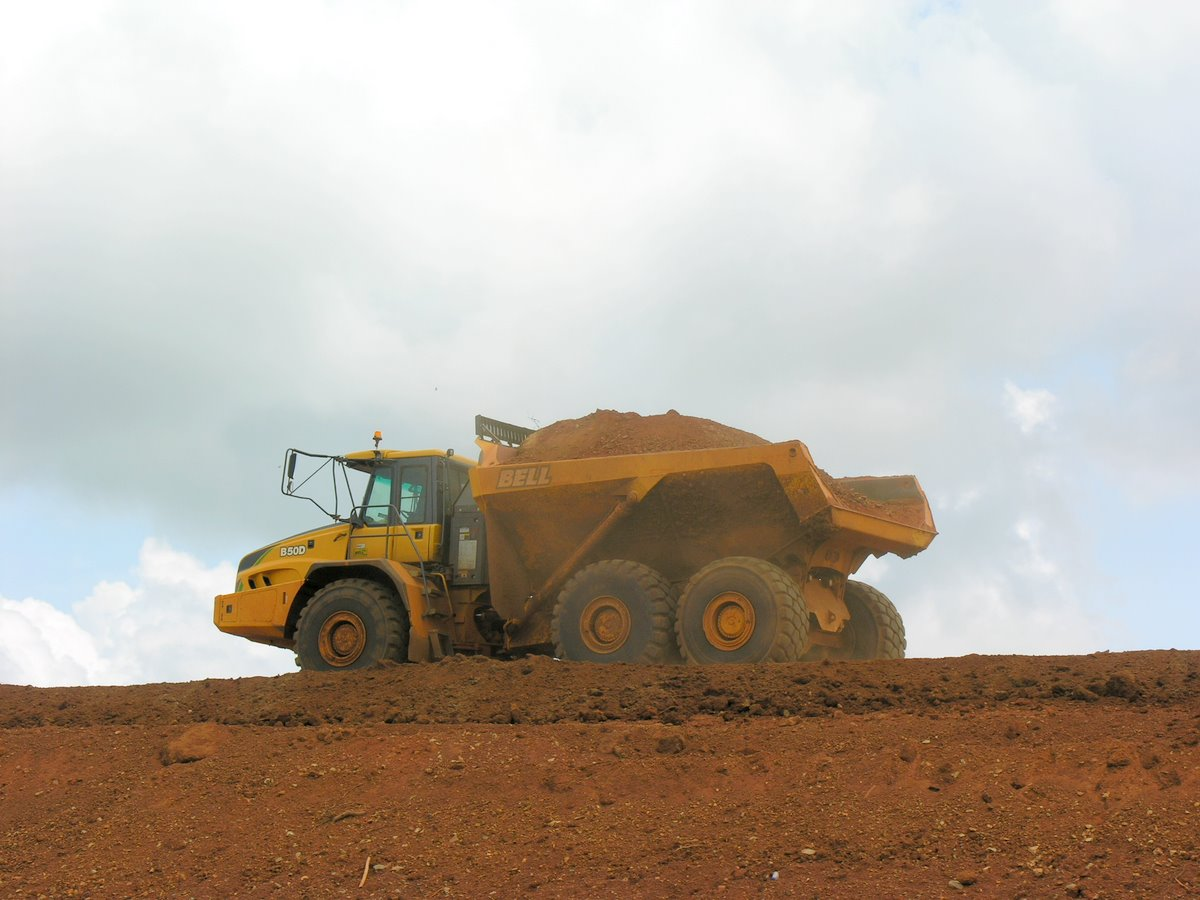
Buzwagi Gold Mine

Nickel reserves amounting to 290,000 tonnes were discovered in October 2012 by Ngwena Company Limited, a subsidiary of the Australian mining company IMX Resources. An initial investment of around USD $38 million has been made since exploration began in 2006, and nickel should start being mined at the end of 2015.

Chinese firms have been showing major interest in Tanzania's mineral deposits; an announcement was made in late 2011 of a plan by the Sichuan Hongda Group, to invest about US$3 billion to develop the Mchuchuma coal and Liganga iron ore projects in the south of the country. It was also announced in August 2012 that China National Gold Corp are in talks to purchase mining assets in Tanzania from African Barrick Gold, in a deal that could be worth more than £2 billion stg.

In November 2012, the Tanzanian government announced investigations into allegations that mining investors in the country were harassing and on some occasions, killing residents around mining sites.

=== Electricity ===
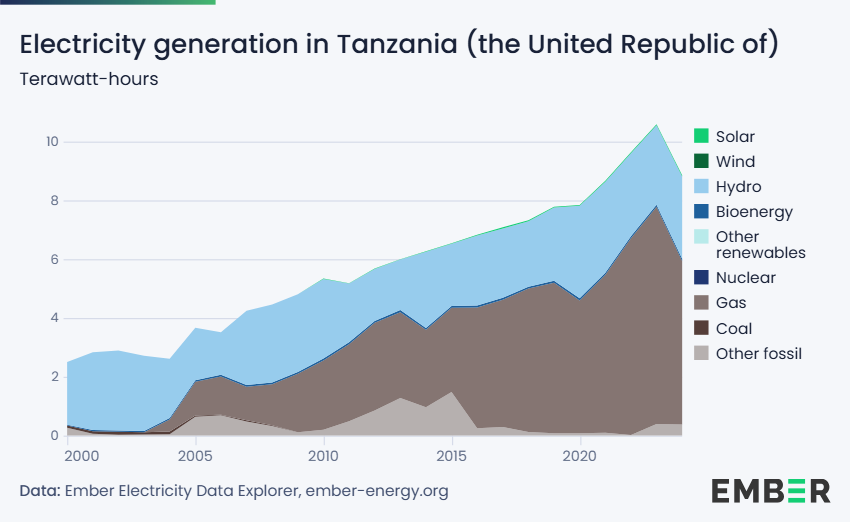
Electricity generation in Tanzania in terawatt-hours

The government-owned Tanzania Electric Supply Company Limited (TANESCO) dominates the electric supply industry in Tanzania. The country generated 6.013 billion kilowatt hours (kWh) of electricity in 2013, a 4.2 percent increase over the 5.771 billion kWh generated in 2012. Generation increased by 63 percent between 2005 and 2012; however, only 15 percent of Tanzanians had access to electric power in 2011. Almost 18 percent of the electricity generated in 2012 was lost because of theft and transmission and distribution problems. The electrical supply varies, particularly when droughts disrupt hydropower electric generation; rolling blackouts are implemented as necessary. The unreliability of the electrical supply has hindered the development of Tanzanian industry. In 2013, 49.7 percent of Tanzania's electricity generation came from natural gas, 28.9 percent from hydroelectric sources, 20.4 percent from thermal sources, and 1.0 percent from outside the country. The government is building a 532 kilometres (331 mi) gas pipeline from Mnazi Bay to Dar es Salaam, with a scheduled completion in 2015. This pipeline is expected to allow the country to double its electricity generation capacity to 3,000 megawatts by 2016. The government's goal is to increase capacity to at least 10,000 megawatts by 2025.

=== Natural gas ===
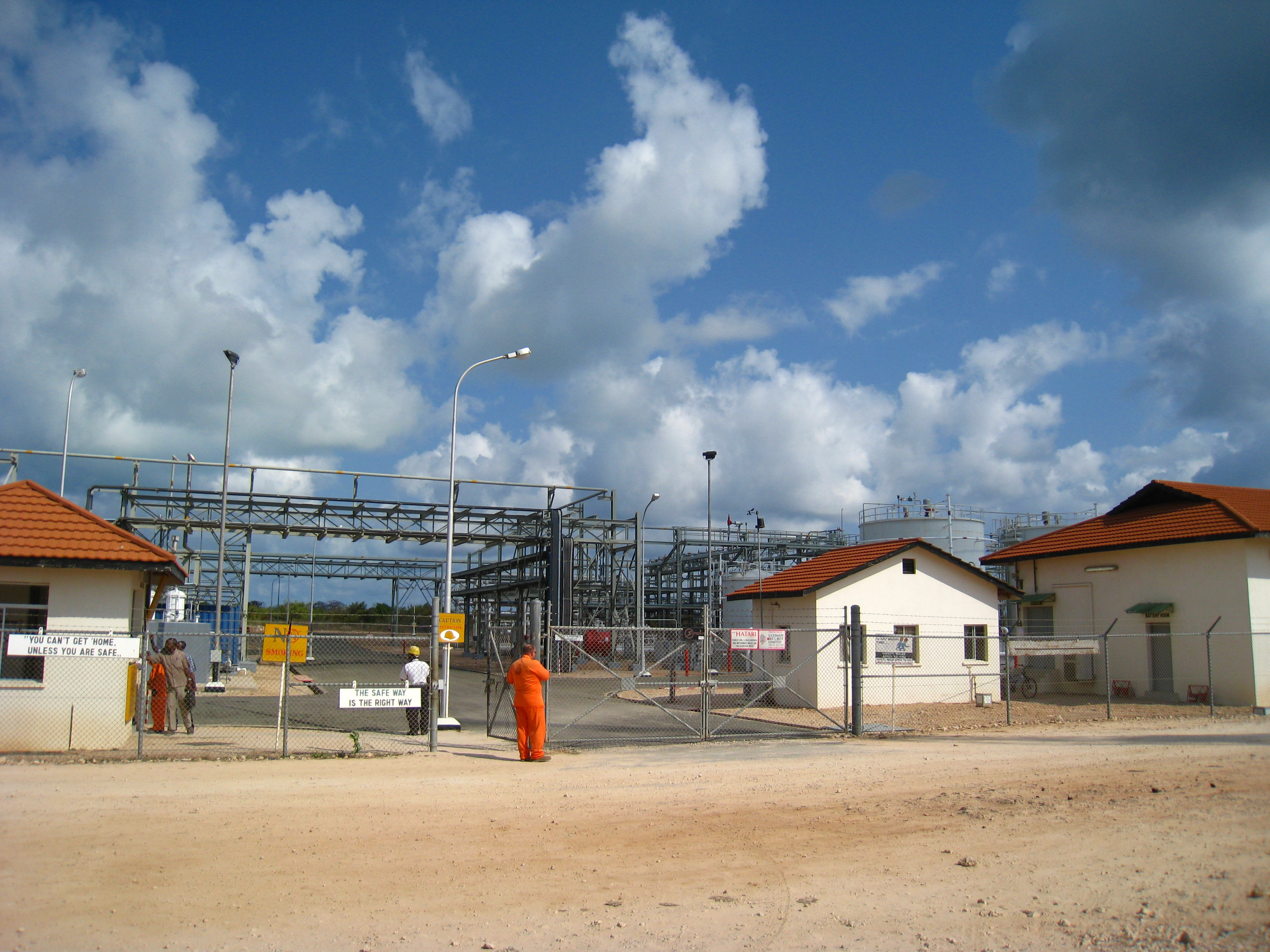
Songo Songo Gas Plant

According to PFC Energy, 25 to 30 trillion cubic feet of recoverable natural gas resources have been discovered in Tanzania since 2010. The value of natural gas actually produced in 2013 was US$52.2 million, a 42.7 percent increase over 2012.

Commercial production of gas from the Songo Songo Island field in the Indian Ocean commenced in 2004, thirty years after it was discovered there. Over 35 billion cubic feet of gas was produced from this field in 2013, with proven, probable, and possible reserves totalling 1.1 trillion cubic feet. The gas is transported by pipeline to Dar es Salaam. As of 27 August 2014, TANESCO owed the operator of this field, Orca Exploration Group Inc., US$50.4 million, down from US$63.8 million two months earlier.

A newer natural gas field in Mnazi Bay in 2013 produced about one-seventh of the amount produced near Songo Songo Island but has proven, probable, and possible reserves of 2.2 trillion cubic feet. Virtually all of that gas is being used for electricity generation in Mtwara.

The Indian Ocean, off the coast of Mozambique and Tanzania, is proving to be a rich hunting ground for natural gas exploration. According to US Geological Survey estimates, the combined gas reserves of Mozambique and Tanzania could be as high as 250 trillion cubic feet. In Mozambique alone, proven gas reserves have increased dramatically from a mere 4.6 trillion cubic feet in 2013 to 98.8 trillion cubic feet as of mid-2015. Given continued offshore discoveries and the size of discoveries to date, continued growth in proven gas reserves is likely to continue into the foreseeable future.

In 2014, Tanzania's natural gas production was 19 billion cubic feet (Bcf), a 30% decline from five years prior, but increased in mid-2015 following the commencement of operations at the Mnazi Bay Concession and a new pipeline to Dar es Salaam. Significant gas discoveries, including 16 to 17 trillion cubic feet (Tcf) by the BG Group and partners, and 22 Tcf by Statoil with ExxonMobil, have positioned Tanzania to potentially become an LNG exporter. However, development plans, including an LNG plant agreed upon in 2014 with international companies and the Tanzania Petroleum Development Corporation (TPDC), have not advanced to sanctioning.

New exploration on more frontier blocks, however, will likely be slowed as oil and gas prices fall and companies apply increasing caution to investing in frontier markets with nascent industries, poor infrastructure and long lead times.

The exploration and development of natural gas in Tanzania have boosted its economic framework. In 2024, the Ntorya gas field received a 25-year development license, a major step in harnessing Tanzania's natural gas. Managed by ARA Petroleum Tanzania Limited (APT), this field is expected to begin producing substantial gas quantities for domestic use within a year. Initial production is projected at 40 million cubic feet per day, with potential expansion to 140 million cubic feet per day in future years.

== External trade and investment ==
Exports of Tanzania by product category (2019) Chemical products Transportation Machines Mineral products Plastics and rubbers Metals Foodstuffs Precious metals Textiles Instruments Animal products Vegetable products Paper goods Footwear and headwear Miscellaneous Stone and glass Wood products Animal and vegetable bi-products Animal hides Arts and antiques Weapons

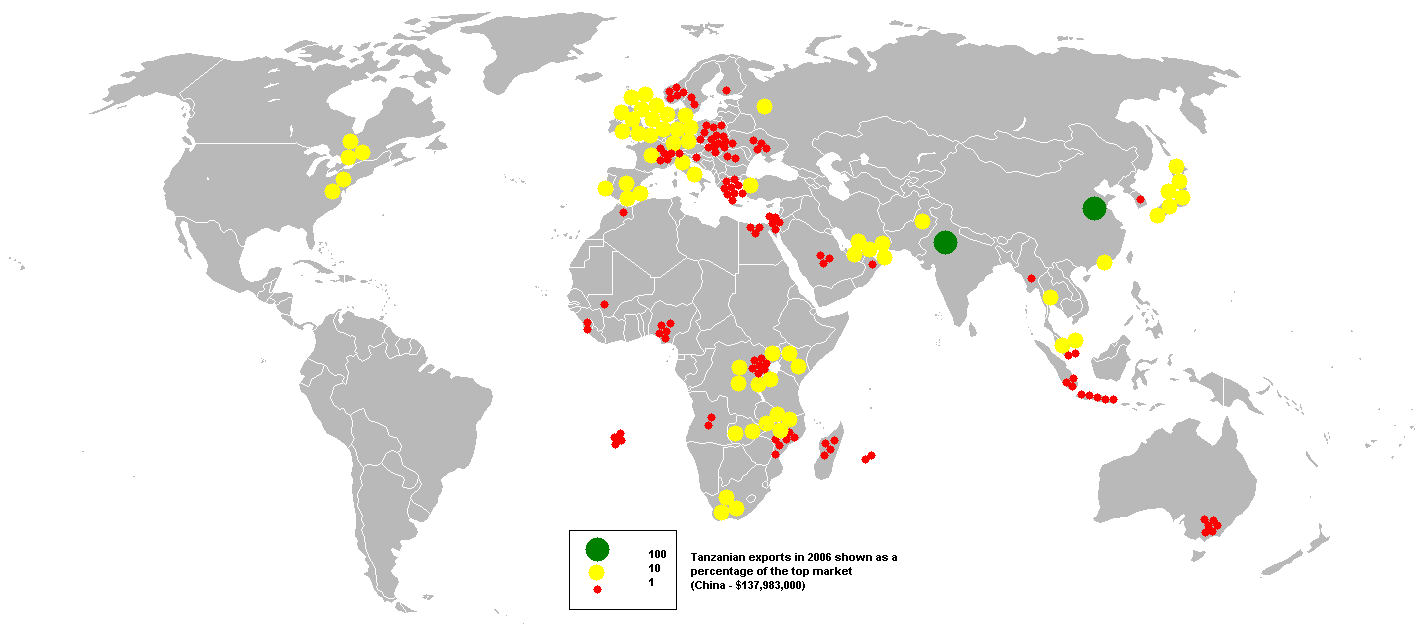
Tanzanian exports in 2006

Tanzania's history of political stability has encouraged foreign direct investment. The government has committed itself to improve the investment climate including redrawing tax codes, floating the exchange rate, licensing foreign banks, and creating an investment promotion centre to cut red tape. Its economy is currently being managed according to the Tanzania Mini-Tiger Plan. Tanzania has mineral resources and a largely untapped tourism sector, which might make it a viable market for foreign investment.

The stock market capitalisation of listed companies in Tanzania was valued at $588 million in 2005 by the World Bank.

== Zanzibar ==
Zanzibar's economy is based primarily on the production of cloves (90% grown on the island of Pemba), the principal foreign exchange earner. Exports have suffered from the downturn in the clove market.

The Government of Zanzibar has been more aggressive than its mainland counterpart in instituting economic reforms and has legalized foreign exchange bureaus on the islands. This has loosened up the economy and dramatically increased the availability of consumer commodities. Furthermore, with external funding, the government plans to make the port of Zanzibar a free port. Rehabilitation of current port facilities and plans to extend these facilities will be the precursor to the free port. The island's manufacturing sector is limited mainly to import substitution industries, such as cigarettes, shoes, and process agricultural products. In 1992, the government designated two export-producing zones and encouraged the development of offshore financial services. Zanzibar still imports much of its staple requirements, petroleum products, and manufactured articles.

== Literature ==
- Paul Collier: Labour and Poverty in Rural Tanzania. Ujamaa and Rural Development in the United Republic of Tanzania. Oxford University Press, 1991, ISBN 0-19-828315-6.
- Klocke, Sascha; Jerven, Morten. 2025. "The Growth, Inequality, and Poverty Nexus: Lessons from Long-term Trends in Tanzania, 1961–2017". Forum for Development Studies.

== See also ==
- Tanzania and the World Bank
- List of regions of Tanzania by GDP
- List of companies of Tanzania
- Tanzania Zanzibar International Register of Shipping
- Taxation in Tanzania
- Child labour in Tanzania
- Microfinance in Tanzania
- Poverty in Tanzania
- Economy of Africa
- United Nations Economic Commission for Africa
- Economy of East Africa
