= Tourism in Tanzania =

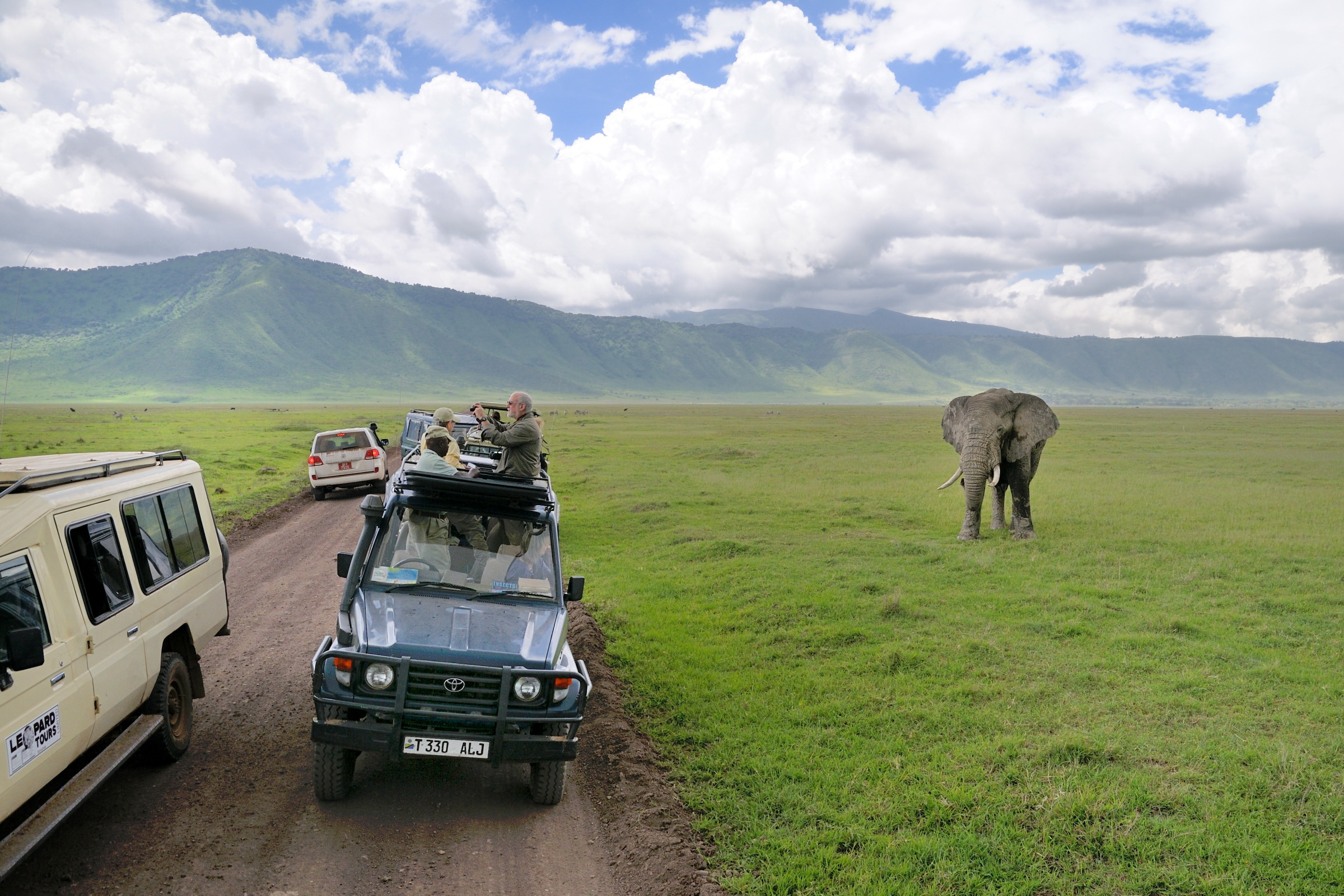
Tourists watching an elephant in the Ngorongoro Crater

Tanzania is a country with many tourist attractions. Approximately 38 percent of Tanzania's land area is set aside in protected areas for conservation. There are 21 national parks, 29 game reserves, 40 controlled conservation areas (including the Ngorongoro Conservation Area) and marine parks. Tanzania is also home to Mount Kilimanjaro, the highest point in Africa.

Travel and tourism contributed 17.2 percent of Tanzania's gross domestic product in 2016 and employed 11.0 percent of the country's labour force (1,189,300 jobs) in 2013. The sector is growing rapidly, rising from US$1.74 billion in 2004 to US$4.48 billion in 2013. In 2016, 1,284,279 tourists arrived at Tanzania's borders compared to 590,000 in 2005.

In 2024, the Tanzanian tourism sector generated US$3.2 billion in revenues with 1.75 million tourist arrivals.

In 2020, due to Covid-19, travel receipts declined to US$1.06 billion and the number of international tourist arrivals declined to 616,491.

In October 2021, the Ministry of Natural Resources and Tourism of Tanzania has been granted TSh.90 billion/= for the financial year 2021-2022, part of the IMF loan for emergency financial assistance to support Tanzania's efforts in responding to the Covid-19 pandemic.

== Tourist attractions ==
=== National parks in Tanzania ===
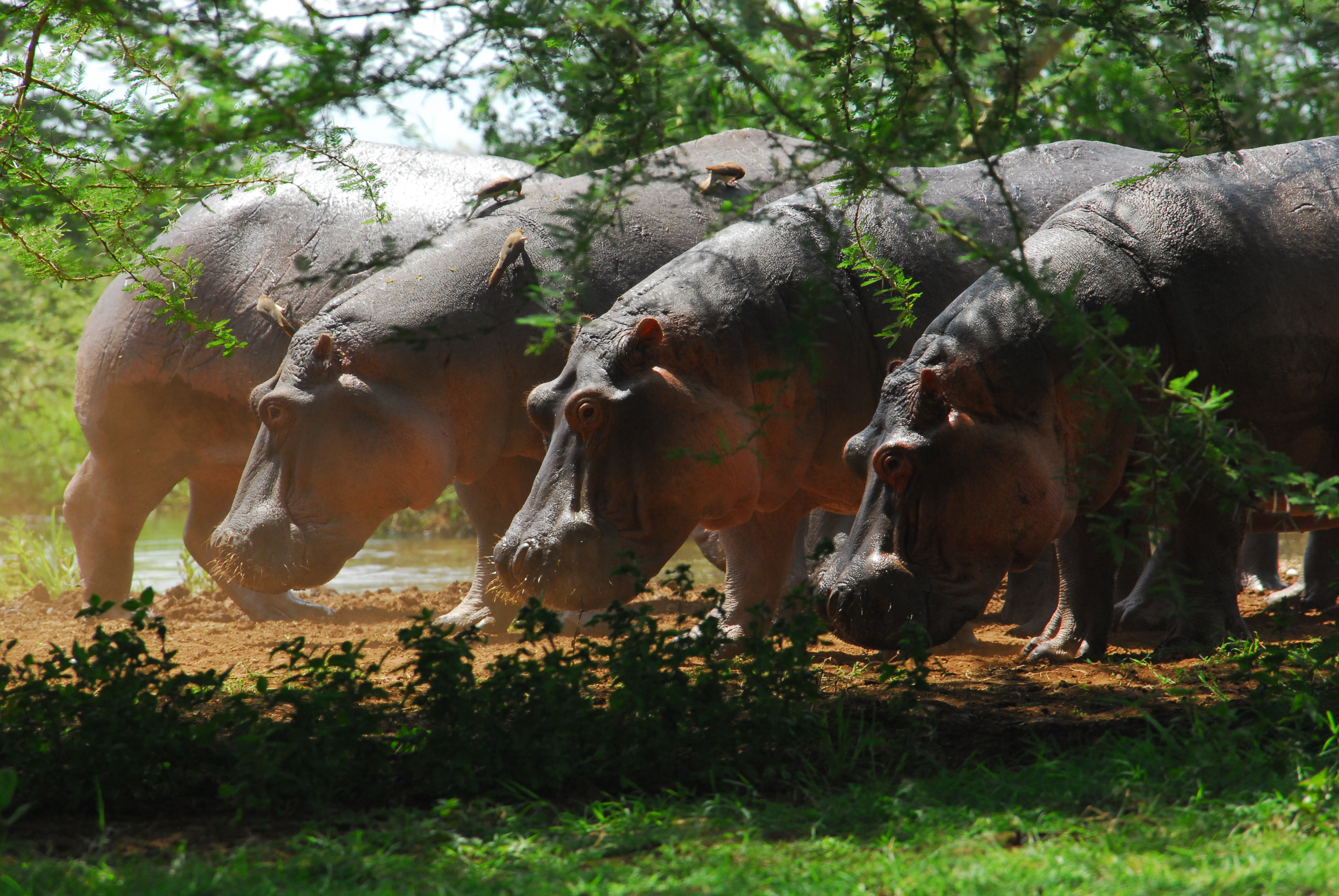
Hippos in the Lake Manyara National Park in the year 2012

Tanzania has almost 38% of its land reserved as protected areas, one of the world's highest percentage. Tanzania boasts 21 national parks and is home to a large variety of animal life. Among the large mammals include the Big five: cheetahs, wildebeest, giraffes, hippopotamuses and various antelopes. Tanzania's most well known wildlife attractions are located in the northern part of the country and include the Serengeti National Park, Tarangire National Park and Lake Manyara National Park. The Serengeti National park includes the world-famous great migrations of animals. It is the most popular park in the country and had the chance to host more than 589,000 visitors in 2024.

In 2025, Serengeti National Park was voted the best African Safari Park following the depth study conducted by SafariBookings, the largest online marketplace for African safaris. In their website, it reads, In total 3,008 reviews were collected from the SafariBookings website. The 2,234 user reviews were contributed by safari tourists from 63 countries. To complement these user reviews, reputable guidebook authors (working for Lonely Planet, Rough Guides, Frommer's, Bradt and Footprint) teamed up in the SafariBookings Expert Panel to write 774 expert reviews.

The north is also home to the Ngorongoro Conservation Area. The Ngorongoro Conservation Area includes the Ngorongoro Crater, which is an extinct volcanic caldera with lions, hippopotamus, elephants, various types of antelope, the endangered black rhinoceros, and large herds of wildebeest and zebra. Olduvai Gorge, considered to be the seat of humanity after the discovery of the earliest known specimens of the human genus, Homo habilis as well as early hominidae, such as Paranthropus boisei also lies within the conservation area.

The western part of Tanzania includes the Mahale, Katavi, and Gombe national parks, the latter of which is the site of Jane Goodall's ongoing study, begun in 1960, of chimpanzee behaviour. The country is also particularly rich in plant diversity, the Tanzania National Parks Authority has an entire national park the Kitulo National Park dedicated to flowers. There is a wide variety of biomass across the nation.

=== The Mount Kilimanjaro ===
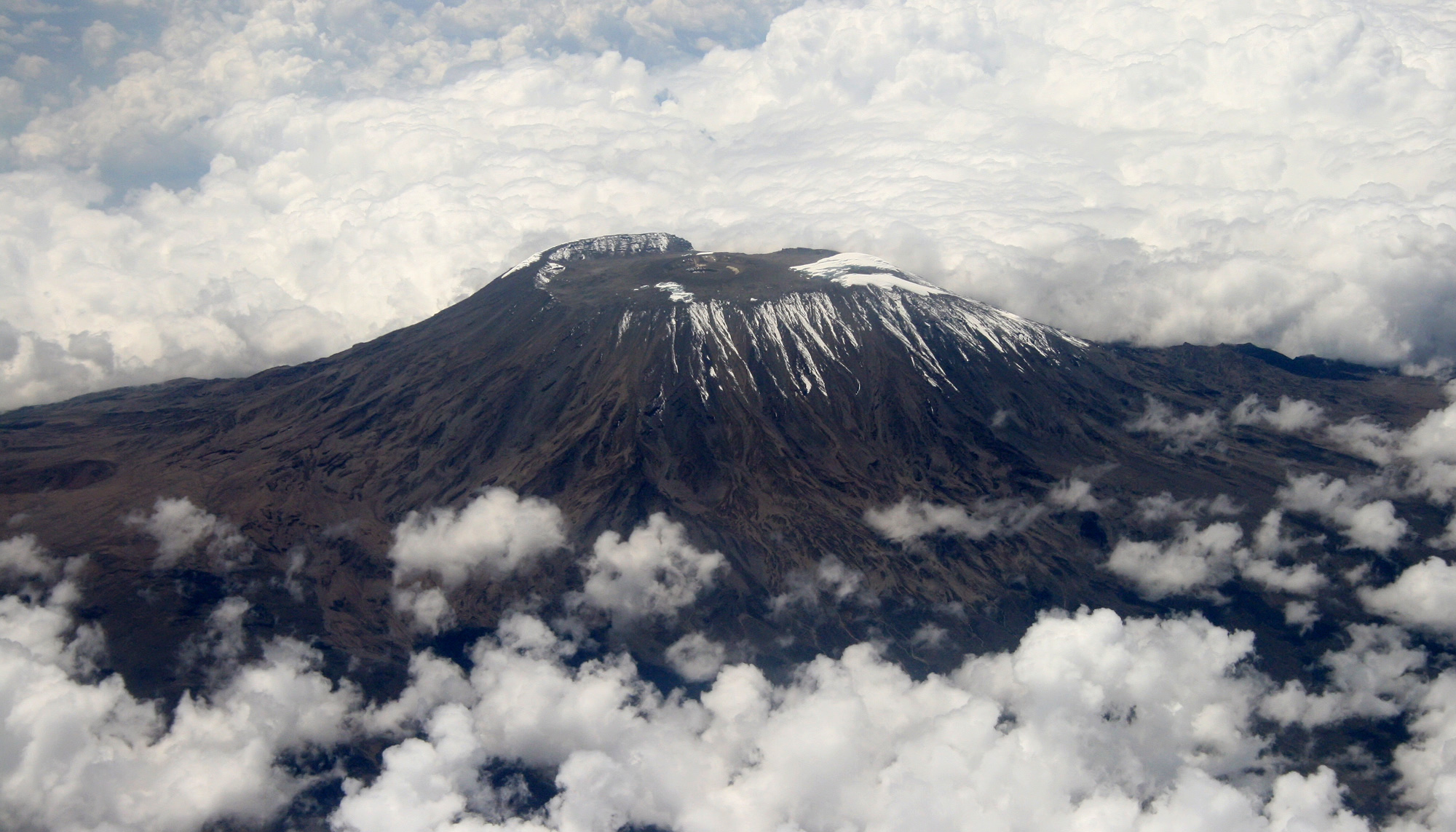
An aerial view of Mount Kilimanjaro in the year 2009

Also known as the roof of Africa, Mount Kilimanjaro is a UNESCO World Heritage site and the highest peak in Africa. The mountain (now a dormant volcano) rises approximately 4,877 metres (16,001 ft) from its base to 5,895 metres (19,341 ft) above sea level. The mountain is located in the north of the country on the border with Kenya in the town of Moshi and is accessible via Kilimanjaro International Airport. The airport also provides a gateway for tourists to all northern safari circuits. The mountain is part of Kilimanjaro National Park and is the second most popular park in the country and roughly 20,000 visitors trek the mountain every year. The mountain is one of the most accessible high peaks in the world and has an average success rate of around 65%.

=== Zanzibar ===
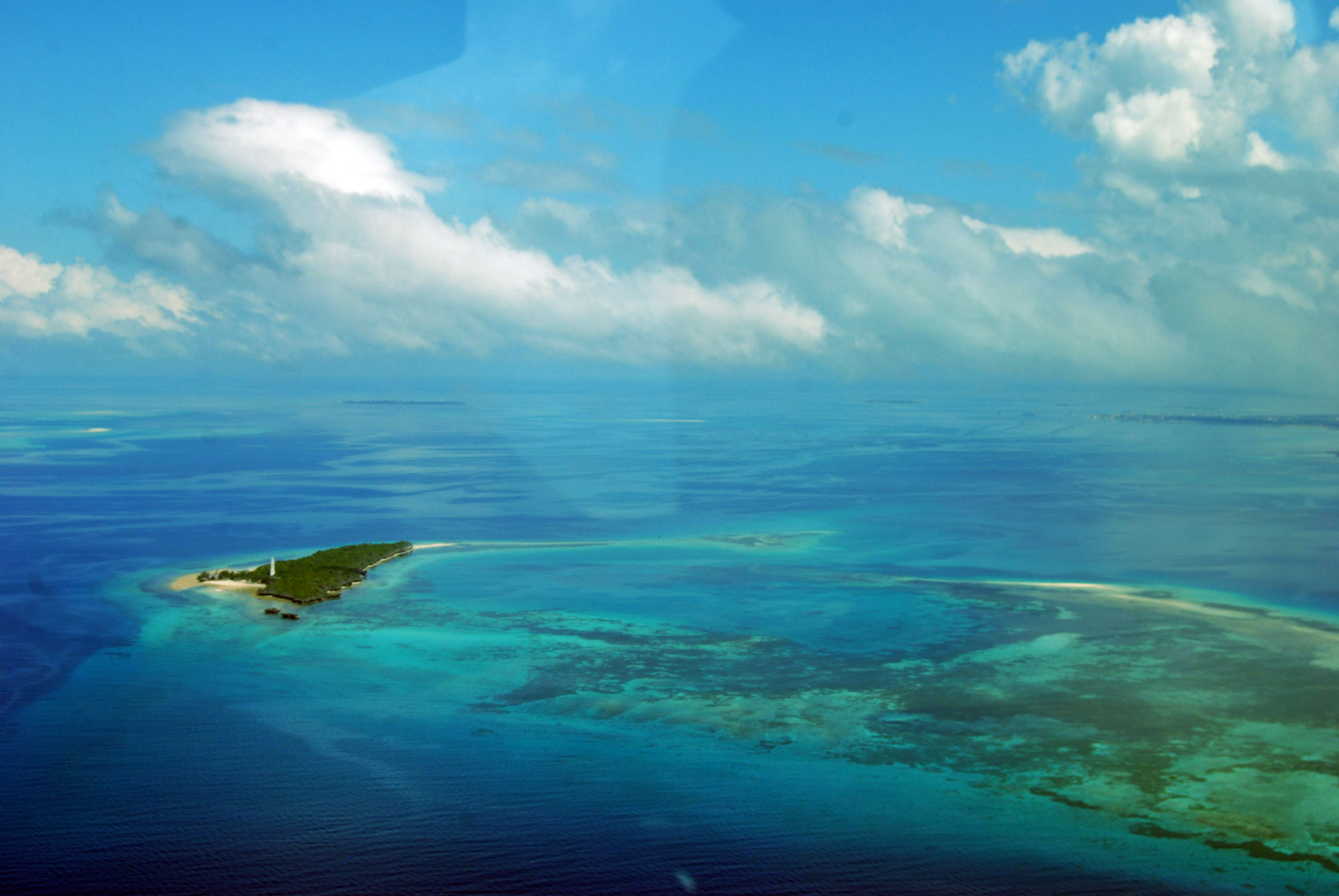
The coastline of Zanzibar

Tourism in Zanzibar includes the tourism industry and its effects on the islands of Unguja (known internationally as Zanzibar) and Pemba in Zanzibar a semi-autonomous region in the United Republic of Tanzania. Tourism is the top income generator for the islands, outpacing even the lucrative agricultural export industry and providing roughly 25% of income. The main airport on the island is Zanzibar International Airport, though many tourists fly into Dar es Salaam and take a ferry to the island.

The Government of Zanzibar plays a major role in promoting the industry. Zanzibar Commission for Tourism recorded more than doubling the number of tourists from the 2015/2016 fiscal year and the following year, from 162,242 to 376,000.

The increase in tourism has led to significant environmental impacts and mixed impacts on local communities, which were expected to benefit from economic development but in large part have not. Communities have witnessed increasing environmental degradation, and that flow of tourists has reduced the access of local communities to the marine and coastal resources that are the center of tourist activity.

=== UNESCO World Heritage Sites ===
Tanzania is home to seven UNESCO World Heritage sites with 6 of them on the mainland and 1 in Zanzibar. Currently there are 5 more sites viable to be nominated such as the Gombe National Park and the East African slave trade route.

Location of World Heritage Sites within Tanzania

== Visa policy ==
The Visa policy of Tanzania

Most visitors to Tanzania must obtain a visa from one of the Tanzanian diplomatic missions. However, a majority of nations can obtain a visitor visa at any port of entry land or air. Most SADC citizens or East African Community citizens do not need a visa for tourism purposes. 3-month tourist visas are available for US$50 at all ports of entry (except US citizens must buy US$100 1 year multiple entry visas). Tanzania does not fall under the East African Tourist Visa regime and a separate visa is required to enter Tanzania. All visitors must hold a passport valid for 6 months (according to the Tanzanian immigration department) or a month beyond the period of intended stay (according to IATA).

== Statistics ==
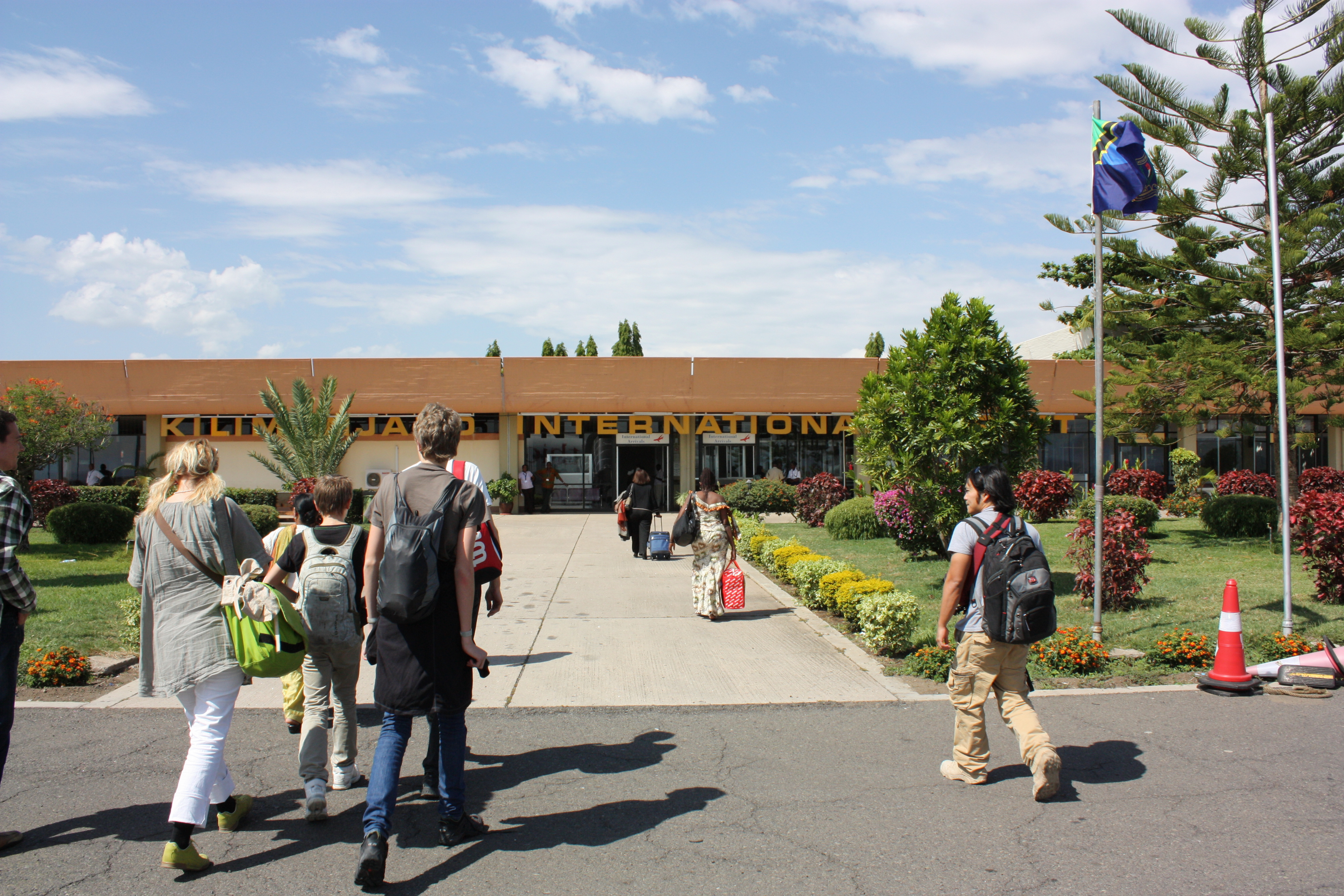
The Kilimanjaro International Airport: The largest airport in the north to access the northern national parks.

Tourist arrivals of 2024 in %

In 2024 a total of 1,748,500 tourists visited Tanzania continuing the year on year growth of visitors. Compared to the size and potential Tanzania has the second lowest number of tourists only above Burundi. Almost 50% of tourists into were from Africa and the number has been rising due to the increase in regional integration and improved flight connectivity. Though the industry has been continually growing, the Great Recession and the 2014 Ebola outbreak hurt the industry heavily.

In 2020, Tanzania, like many other countries, was significantly impacted by the COVID-19 pandemic, though by mid-2021 the tourism sector began to recover. In 2022, the country welcomed 1,454,920 tourists, and in 2023, this number rose to 1,808,205, according to Angellah Kairuki, Tanzania's Minister of Tourism and Natural Resources.

The most visited destinations remain Serengeti National Park with over 589,000 visitors, Tarangire with 241,741 and Mt Kilimanjaro with 40,000 visitors. Over 2023 Ngorongoro Conservation Area attracted 515,961 visitors.

Tourism revenue in Tanzania rose by 33.5% in 2023, reaching USD 3.37 billion, compared to USD 2.53 billion in 2022. The increase was attributed to a 24.3% growth in international tourist arrivals. english.news.cn

By end of year 2024; Tanzania hosted 5.36 million tourists in 2024, a record high and breaking its target of attracting 5 million tourists by 2025, said Pindi Chana, minister for natural resources and tourism according to english.news.cn.

=== Tourist arrivals by year ===
Foreign traveller arrivals (2000-2016)
Year	Foreign arrivals	Year	Foreign arrivals
2000	501,669	2009	714,367
2001	525,122	2010	754,000
2002	575,296	2011	843,000
2003	576,198	2012	1,043,000
2004	582,807	2013	1,063,000
2005	612,754	2014	1,093,000
2006	644,124	2015	1,137,182
2007	719,031	2016	1,284,279
2008	770,376	2017	1,327,143
2022	1,454,920	2023	1,808,205
2024	5,360,000		

=== Arrivals by country ===
Tourist Admissions into Tanzania by country in calendar year 2024

Most visitors arriving in Tanzania were from the following countries of nationality:

Country/Territory	2024	2022	2021	2019	2018	2017	2016	2015	2014	2013
Kenya	233,115	166,324	89,842	128,287	126,479	230,922	233,730	197,562	188,214	193,078
Burundi	201,080	100,851	75,507	32,070	37,643	66,357	63,530	48,210	51,553	34,873
United States	143,378	100,600	48,537	218,394	234,890	82,283	86,860	66,394	80,489	69,671
France	110,431	100,371	51,647	94,688	54,205	34,505	24,611	28,683	33,585	33,335
Italy	106,177	45,282	7,013	99,270	58,722	51,758	50,715	53,742	49,518	57,372
Germany	102,798	67,718	25,081	82,470	81,308	58,394	57,643	52,236	47,262	53,951
United Kingdom	88,345	60,116	18,276	122,178	114,433	61,048	67,742	54,599	70,379	59,279
DRC	70,174	32,159	29,031	n/a	n/a	n/a	n/a	n/a	n/a	n/a
China	69,651	13,974	9,351	36,654	45,171	29,197	34,472	25,444	21,246	17,001
Zambia	66,491	46,787	28,076	35,126	34,631	22,561	28,836	32,694	36,679	64,825
India	63,391	36,925	28,431	21,687	31,921	38,487	69,876	32,608	27,327	27,334
Rwanda	62,977	44,288	34,929	7,025	8,733	50,431	47,056	45,216	50,038	46,637
Uganda	60,170	38,435	23,855	30,545	48,182	37,160	37,870	37,253	36,420	39,488
Poland	55,196	46,431	38,860	n/a	n/a	n/a	n/a	n/a	n/a	n/a
South Africa	53,737	39,755	29,690	58,035	67,757	47,777	43,468	30,288	26,614	31,144
Mozambique	42,977	22,188	n/a	n/a	n/a	n/a	n/a	n/a	n/a	n/a
Netherlands	42,007	27,810	9,634	83,998	42,160	26,542	24,197	20,150	23,710	20,633
Zimbabwe	39,641	28,897	16,791	31,308	33,878	26,543	22,148	30,533	36,497	30,765
Malawi	37,492	44,438	41,906	3,818	4,668	29,197	19,246	15,807	18,242	18,197
Spain	31,635	25,434	13,150	70,253	36,137	14,599	15,411	11,940	9,121	13,149
Australia	14,641	6,527	1,825	29,017	28,458	15,926	15,411	15,807	15,962	17,336
Russia	12,314	8,174	77,422	n/a	n/a	n/a	n/a	n/a	n/a	n/a
Israel	9,586	17,292	6,303	9,163	6,173	37,160	22,967	14,754	7,403	5,344
Ukraine	6,701	12,890	20,736	n/a	n/a	n/a	n/a	n/a	n/a	n/a
Total	2,141,895	1,454,920	922,692	1,527,230	1,505,702	1,327,143	1,284,279	1,137,182	1,140,156	1,095,885

== Controversies ==
=== Maasai displacement ===
In recent years, the Tanzanian government has intensified efforts to expand conservation areas, leading to the displacement of Maasai communities. The policies aim to increase protected territories from 30% to 50% of the country's landmass, prohibiting human habitation and the construction of essential infrastructure such as schools and hospitals within these zones. On June 6, 2022, the officials announced that it would demarcate 1,500 square kilometers of village land as a game reserve, barring Maasai residents of Loliondo division, Ngorongoro district, from living on the land, using it for grazing, or even entering the area to access water for household and agricultural use.

Tourism development in this areas has attracted foreign investments in luxury tourism, including a $9 million Chinese-funded geopark in the Ngorongoro Conservation Area and a $7 billion investment from the United Arab Emirates for a hunting ground in Loliondo. The Maasai, traditionally reliant on these lands for grazing, face restricted access, deteriorating public services, and increased health risks due to the closure of medical facilities.

On June 10, 2022, Tanzanian security forces used excessive force, including live ammunition and tear gas, to suppress peaceful protests by Maasai residents of Ololosokwan village in Loliondo. More than 40 people were wounded, many were left homeless, and approximately 2,000 were forced to flee to neighboring Kenya.

In response to the alleged violations, the World Bank suspended $150 million in tourism development funding for Tanzania, while the European Commission similarly froze a $10 million project.

== See also ==
- Outline of Tanzania
