= Tanzania Social Support Foundation =

Non-Governmental Organisation in Dar es Salaam, Tanzania

- Shirika la Msaada wa Kijamii Tanzania (Swahili); Tanzaniae Socialis Adiumentum Fundationis (Latin); Fundación de Apoyo Social de Tanzania (Spanish) 坦桑尼亞社會支持基金 (Chinese) مؤسسة الدعم الاجتماعي في تنزانيا (Arabic); Fondation de soutien social de la Tanzanie (French); Tanzanya Sosyal Destek Vakfı (Turkish); Fundação de Apoio Social Tanzânia (Portuguese) (Motto: Serving the Needs of the People)
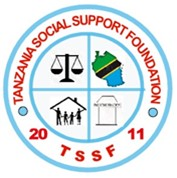
- Abbreviation: TSSF
- Predecessor: Doli Foundation
- Formation: July 18, 2011; 15 years ago
- Founded at: Namtumbo and Mtwara, Tanzania.
- Type: Non-governmental Organization
- Tax ID no.: 136-210-602 (Issued by TRA).
- Registration no.: 00NGO/00006998 (Issued by Registrar of NGOs in Tanzania Mainland).
- Legal status: Body Corporate (Incorporated as TSSF on March 7, 2014; 12 years ago).
- Purpose: Diplomacy, Economic Development, Education, Environment, Good Governance, Healthcare, Social Support, and Tourism.
- Headquarters: Dodoma; Dar es Salaam; Zanzibar City
- Location: Dar es Salaam
- Coordinates: 6°47′33″S 39°12′30″E
- Services: Advocacy, Training, and Empowerment
- Methods: Donations, Grants and Endowment
- Fields: Charity, Civil Society, and Non-profit
- Members: 3,598 (2021)
- Official language: English, Kiswahili, Latin, Spanish, Chinese, Arabic, French, Turkish and Portuguese
- President: Donati Salla
- Vice President: Deogratias Shio
- Treasurer: Shaban Thomas
- Main organ: General Assembly
- Subsidiaries: Pan African Forum of Civil Societies; People and Development Foundation; Social Support International Limited (L.L.C). Consortium of Social Support Foundations
- Staff: 12 (2021)
- Volunteers: 68 (2021)
- Website: www.tssf.or.tz tssf-org-tz.weebly.com tssf-org-tz.blogspot.com
- Remarks: Empowering the Sensible Efforts
- Formerly called: Doli Foundation

Tanzania Social Support Foundation (TSSF) is a non-governmental organization which is primarily and duly registered under the Non-Governmental Organisations' Act, [Cap.56 R.E 2019] of the Laws of the United Republic of Tanzania. The TSSF is legally a body corporate that is mandated to operate in whole of the part of the United Republic of Tanzania as the National oriented Non-Governmental Organization. Since its permanent incorporation on 7 March 2014, the TSSF has been focusing on promotion of Diplomacy, Economic Development, Education, Environment, Good Governance, Healthcare, Social Support and Tourism.

== TSSF and Civil Society Empowerment in African Continent ==
Tanzania Social Support Foundation has been a base for empowering the Civil Societies in the African Continent; and it is among the front line Organizations which is advocating for the civil societies' welfare in Africa. In 2015 Tanzania Social Support Foundation managed to invite civil societies across Africa and establish the Pan African Forum of Civil Societies

== TSSF and Community Empowerment in Tanzania ==
In 2014 Tanzania Social Support Foundation started to run a life skills training programs to youths across the Universities and Colleges in Tanzania for the purpose of preparing Tanzanian youth graduate be ready to face the challenges related to unemployment and in November 2014 the Organization held a National Youth Summit with the theme Understanding Gas and Oil Economy: Policies and its implications to youths of Tanzania Also TSSF runs a Center for Development in South - Eastern Tanzania (CDSET) which is special for empowering the residents of Mtwara and Lindi Regions of Tanzania in both economic, social, and cultural dimensions of life.

== TSSF Higher Education Fund ==
In 2017, the Tanzania Social Support Foundation launched its Higher Education Fund that is dedicated to offer scholarships and tuition waivers to over 50,000 students of the higher learning institutions as a way to serve all those who appear to miss the educational loans from the Government of the United Republic of Tanzania for which the fund is set to assist the student - citizens of the United Republic of Tanzania who are academically gifted but they fail to access the higher education due to their financial situation as they are originated from the very low-income families and disadvantaged backgrounds.

== Consortium of Social Support Foundations ==
On 6 January 2018 the TSSF launched its Private International Civil Society that is known as Consortium of Social Support Foundations with the main objective of advocating for the doctrine of social support across the world

== List of directors-general of the Tanzania Social Support Foundation ==
No.	Name	Took office	Left office	Time in office
1	Lilian Kiwango	18 July 2011	28 February 2013	1 year, 225 days
2	Donati Salla	1 March 2013	Incumbent	13 years, 246 days.
