= Waste Atlas =

Waste Atlas partnership is a non-commercial initiative supported by significant global range non-profit organizations, including D-Waste, ISWA, WtERT, SWEEP-Net, SWAPI, and University of Leeds ^{[1]}.

Currently, Waste Atlas hosts waste data for 164 countries; more than 1,800 cities from all over the world and approximately 2,500 waste management facilities (1,626 sanitary landfills, 716 WtE, 129 MBT, 78 BT and 89 of the world’s biggest dumpsites).

== Global Correlation Charts and Global Waste Maps ==
Global Correlation Charts is a set of global charts which correlate waste indicators such as waste generation per capita and collection coverage with socio-economic indicators such as income indicators and human development index.

Global Waste Maps is a set of global maps that visualise waste management indicators such as waste collection coverage, waste generation per capita, etc.

== Waste Atlas Report ==
=== 1st Annual report ===
2013 Waste Atlas report is dedicated to global solid waste management assessment and is based on data from 162 countries and 1,773 cities. According to the outcomes of the report, current annual municipal solid waste generation is assessed to about 1.9 billion tonnes with almost 30% of it to remain uncollected. More than half of the world’s population does not have access to a regular refuse collection services, as for the waste collected, 70% of it is led for disposal to landfills and dumpsites, 14.5% is recycled or recovered in formal systems and 11% is led to thermal treatment facilities. It is assessed that 3.5 billion people lack access to even the most elementary form of waste management.

=== 2nd Annual report ===
2014 Waste Atlas report is dedicated to unsound waste disposal, particularly in dumpsites. The 50 biggest dumpsites around the world are listed with the most important information relating to their operation visualized in a unified way. Data relating to the amount and the type of waste disposed in place, the size, the waste concentration, the number of informal waste pickers, the population and the natural resources within a radius of 10 km and the distance of the nearest settlements are presented. The research relied on crowd-sourcing 59,000 files from 25 countries. The results of the report highlight the health and environmental impacts of dumpsites and show that the 50 biggest active dumpsites affect daily, the lives of 64 million people, a figure almost equal to the population of France, their total waste volume is 0.6-0.8 m^{3} almost 200-300 times the volume of the Great Pyramid of Giza. The statistical analysis showed that a typical waste dumpsite covers an area of 24 ha equal to around 29 big international football fields.
