= Poverty in Tanzania =

Tanzania has a current population of 55.57 million people. Current statistics form the World Bank show that in 2011, 49.1% of Tanzanians lived below US$1.90 per day. This figure is an improvement over 2007's report indicating a poverty rate of 55.1%. Tanzania has seen annual GDP gains of 7% since 2010 and this economic growth is attributed to this positive trends for poverty alleviation in Tanzania. The 2019 World Bank report showed that in the last 10 years, poverty has reduced by 8 percent, from 34.4% in 2007 to 26.4% in 2018.

Recently there has been statistical reductions in the levels of extreme poverty, basic needs poverty, and food poverty. However, these reductions are occurring faster in urban areas as compared to rural areas.

== Indicators of Poverty ==
GDP

Trends in GDP per capita also break along the same divisions, with Dar es Salaam's GDP per capita at TSh 1,600,000/= as compared to the Tanzania Mainland's of 600,000/=. High levels of economic growth in Tanzania has been sustained since 2001, yet the current high rates of poverty challenge whether pure economic growth can be realized in human development.

Food Poverty

The split between rural and urban poverty is most extreme in terms of food insecurity. As of 2012 only 1% of Tanzanian's in Dar es Salaam experience food poverty as compared to 11.3% of Tanzania's living in rural areas.

HDI

Utilizing the Human Development Index, urban areas Dar es Salaam and Arusha are classified as having Medium levels of HDI, while the remainder of Tanzania has Low HDI. HDI indicators also show the life expectancy is on the rise, as well as declines in infant mortality.

== Rural poverty ==
Trends in poverty alleviation in Tanzania vary greatly between urban and rural areas in which about 70% of Tanzania's population dwells. Endowments play a large part in distributing economic growth unevenly, with urban households having better access to infrastructure, health services, and education. Migratory trends towards urbanization, which have risen from “5.6% in 1967 to 29.1% in 2012,” are only increasing the inequality. Another main factor of rural poverty in Tanzania is the lack of infrastructure to provide energy to a huge part of the population. Which means the electricity sector poses a significant liability to the government.

With most of Tanzania's population living in rural areas, there is a heavy dependency on rain-fed agriculture. 76% of Tanzanian's rely on agriculture or on access to natural resources for their livelihood. The reliance on agriculture leaves Tanzanian's especially susceptible to economic shocks due to climate change.

== Child poverty ==
Slow economic growth is a contributory factor for child poverty in Tanzania. Based on 2012 estimates, more than a third of households "live below the basic needs poverty line" earning less than $1 a day, while 20% of the total population "live below the food poverty line". However, it is the rural communities of Mainland Tanzania and Zanzibar who are mostly affected. This disparity in wealth between urban and rural is a key factor for child poverty in the rural areas, with 48% lacking basic needs compared to 10% of their peers in the urban areas.

== Leadership systems at the community-level ==
The leadership system in Tanzania starts from ten cells level, meaning that, at least in every ten households, there is one democratically elected leader. The hamlet, which is led by democratically elected chairperson, is composed of 100 households and the village which is led by democratically elected chairperson and employed village executive officer is composed of 3 to 4 hamlets with population ranging from 300 to 500 households. The term for all elected leaders lasts for five years. Accountability is the problem in all these leadership levels as it is also pinpointed by Tim Kelsall, Siri Lange, Simeon Mesaki and Max Mmuya (June, 2005).

== Good Leadership and governance as prerequisite for development ==
Tanzania, like other poor countries such as Uganda, Burundi and Malawi, has corrupt systems. The service delivery survey suggests that "bribes paid to officials in the police, courts, tax services, and land offices amounted to 62 percent of official public expenditures in these areas". Anwar Shah and Mark Schacter (2004) further mentioned the key corruption drivers, that include: The legitimacy of the state as the guardian of the “public interest” is contested – whereby public office holders focus on serving particular client groups linked to them by ethnic, geographic, or other ties; The rule of law is weakly embedded - public sector corruption thrives where laws apply to some but not to others, and where enforcement of the law is often used as a device for furthering private interests rather than protecting the public interest; Institutions of accountability are ineffective - there are glaring weaknesses in institutions of accountability in highly corrupt countries; The commitment of national leaders to combating corruption is weak - widespread corruption endures in the public sector when national authorities are either unwilling or unable to address it forcefully.

== Political Commitment to Poverty Alleviation ==
Tanzania has aligned their goals to alleviate poverty with the Millennium Development Goals (MDG) and the Sustainability Development Goals (SDG) of the United Nations. Implementation of these goals on the domestic level has been introduced into both long and medium term policies.

The medium-term policies include the National Strategy for Growth and Reduction in Poverty (NSGRP) for mainland Tanzania and the Zanzibar Strategy for Growth and Reduction of Poverty (ZSGRP) for the island of Zanzibar. These policies focus poverty alleviation through building up national infrastructure, production capabilities, creating employment opportunities, increasing governmental accountability, and by improving upon quality of life metrics.

== Endowed resources ==
About 90% of Tanzania's population dwells in impoverished rural areas. Resources such as arable land, seasonal rainfall, and people are common to all villages; apart from these, many other villages are endowed with resources, such as minerals, natural forests, rivers, lakes, ocean et cetera. As of 2007 65.7% of people live off of $1.25 or less a day.

== Stable peace in Tanzania ==
Stable peace in the country could be an opportunity to utilize the endowed resources for sustainable development. Tanzania has been enjoying stable peace even before independence due to the fact that there are more than 150 ethnic tribes; Kiswahili as national language that was reinforced during Mwalimu Julius K. Nyerere administration; and abolishment of chiefdoms in the country immediately after independence which existed in every tribe. Despite this precious opportunity of stable peace, the economic condition failed to improve as compared to Rwanda, Mozambique, and Angola which have passed through civil wars for many years, but their economies are picking up.

== Financial and technical support from international organizations ==
Developed countries together with International Financial Institutions have spent billions of US dollars in capacitating the government systems to bring development for many decades, but instead of poverty being decreased, it is increasing. There have been many internationally funded programs aiming at improving national economy since the 1980s, such as National Economic Survival Program (NESP), Structural Adjustment Program (SAP), and Economic Recovery Program (ERP), Economic and Social Action Program (ESAP), Rolling Plan and Forward Budget(RPFB). To-date there is a 25 years Poverty Reduction Strategy (PRSP 2001 – 2025) parallel with Millennium Development Goals (MDGs – 2000 to 2015); now there is Kilimo Kwanza initiative. Despite the observed initiatives, the economy is still insufficient to provide the impetus for the poverty eradication. The mentality of donor-led project is widespread from national to village level – there are several projects that could be accomplished by using locally available resources, for example potable water wells, small irrigation schemes, health structures, school building et cetera, but they have remained unimplemented awaiting for external donor assistance. The well known economic indicators such as GNP and GDP always show that the economy is growing, but in actual sense they do not show how wealth is distributed to the majority. The Tanzanian economy is recorded to improve every year, but more than 80% of its population mostly living in the rural areas are living below poverty line. During the early 1990s, International Financial Institutions (including International Monetary Fund advised Tanzania to do retrenchment and stop employment even in the key sectors, such as education, health and agriculture as a precondition for financial assistance; as a result the economy paralyzed, and now it has a long walk towards achieving socio-economic improvement.

== General elections ==
Political crises in many developing countries, including Tanzania, occur immediately after general election. The worst examples of crises occurred in Kenya after the 2008 General Election and Côte d'Ivoire after the 2011 General Election. In Tanzania, after the 2010 General Election there aroused conflicts which, fortunately, did not turn into a crisis. The conflicts occurred between the ruling party and potential opposition parties, following the complaints from opposition and some activists that the Tanzania National Electoral Commission is allegedly favored the ruling political party. Serious conflicts were observed in Zanzibar (which is part of Tanzania), after 1995, 2000, and 2005 general elections in which Chama cha Mapinduzi (CCM) defeated Civic United Front (CUF). There is a tendency of politicians to spend billions of money (mostly for bribing poor people in exchange for votes) during general election period in order to either get or maintain their leadership positions; but on the other hand, little effort is made towards poverty alleviation initiatives in the communities.

== See also ==
- Administrative divisions of Tanzania
- Economy of Tanzania
- List of countries by percentage of population living in poverty
- Poverty in Africa
