= Sport in Tanzania =

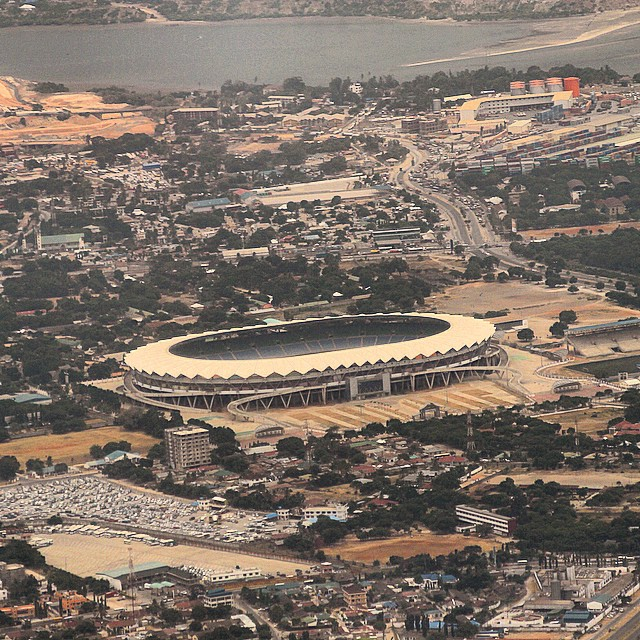
Tanzania National Main Stadium

Tanzania competes in the Commonwealth Games as well as in the African Championships in Athletics. Tanzanian athletes Filbert Bayi and Suleiman Nyambui both won track and field medals in the 1980 Summer Olympics.

Football is widely played all over the country with fans divided between two major clubs, Young Africans and Simba. Football is the most popular sport in Tanzania, despite the little success that has been achieved by the national team. To date, they have never qualified for the FIFA World Cup but have made two appearances in the African Cup of Nations, in 1980, as well as 2019. They finished last in their group in both occasions.

Basketball is also played but mainly in the army and schools. Hasheem Thabeet is a Tanzanian-born player with the Oklahoma City Thunder, the first Tanzanian to play in the NBA. Cricket is a rapidly growing sport in Tanzania after hosting the ICC Cricket League Division 4 in 2008; the national team finished the tournament with a win. Rugby is a minor sport in Tanzania. Tanzania now has a national team, which used to be part of the East Africa team, but was separated. Another minor but growing sport in Tanzania is Baseball - Softball. Tanzania Baseball was introduced by Mr. Shinya Tomonari, a Japan Nationalist and the Chairman of Association for Friends of African Baseball (AFAB), in January 2012. Since then the sport has been played frequently by a number of secondary schools in the country and the participating number of students keeps on increasing. On 12 May 2014, Tanzania Baseball and Softball Association (TaBSA) was established and registered as the National Sporting Association (NSA) responsible for the administration, conduct, control, development and promotion of the sport of baseball in Tanzania, as recognized by the National Sports Council (NSC), the African Baseball and Softball Association (ABSA) and the World Baseball Softball Confederation the International Sport Federation.
