= List of ecoregions in Tanzania =

The following is a list of ecoregions in Tanzania, as identified by the Worldwide Fund for Nature (WWF).

== Terrestrial ecoregions ==
by major habitat type

=== Tropical and subtropical moist broadleaf forests ===
- Albertine Rift montane forests
- East African montane forests
- Eastern Arc forests
- Northern Zanzibar–Inhambane coastal forest mosaic
- Southern Zanzibar–Inhambane coastal forest mosaic

=== Tropical and subtropical grasslands, savannas, and shrublands ===
- Central Zambezian miombo woodlands
- Eastern miombo woodlands
- Itigi–Sumbu thicket
- Northern Acacia–Commiphora bushlands and thickets
- Serengeti volcanic grasslands
- Southern Acacia–Commiphora bushlands and thickets
- Victoria Basin forest–savanna mosaic

=== Flooded grasslands and savannas ===
- East African halophytics
- Zambezian flooded grasslands

=== Montane grasslands and shrublands ===
- East African montane moorlands
- Southern Rift montane forest–grassland mosaic

=== Mangroves ===
- East African mangroves

== Freshwater ecoregions ==
by bioregion

=== Great Lakes ===
- Lake Malawi
- Lake Rukwa
- Lake Tanganyika
- Lakes Kivu, Edward, George, and Victoria

=== Eastern and Coastal ===
- Eastern Coastal Basins
- Malagarasi-Moyowosi
- Pangani
- Southern Eastern Rift

== Marine ecoregions ==
- East African Coral Coast
