= Tanzania Zanzibar International Register of Shipping =

The flag of Tanzania.

The Tanzania Zanzibar International Register of Shipping (TZIRS) is the body appointed by the Tanzania Zanzibar Government to register ships under the Tanzanian flag.
