= International rankings of Tanzania =

These are the international rankings of Tanzania.

== International rankings ==
Organization	Survey	Ranking
Institute for Economics and Peace	Global Peace Index	58 out of 144
United Nations Development Programme	Income adjusted Human Development Index	117 out of 182
Transparency International	Corruption Perceptions Index	87 out of 180
World Economic Forum	Global Competitiveness Report	117 out of 133
World Intellectual Property Organization	Global Innovation Index, 2026	119 out of 139
