= Taxation in Tanzania =

The Tanzania Revenue Authority (TRA) is the government agency of Tanzania, charged with the responsibility of managing the assessment, collection and accounting of all central government revenue in Tanzania.

== History ==
Tanzania adopted and periodically reformed the colonial tax systems starting with the poll tax which was introduced by the British in the early 20th century. Reforms that were done post-colonial era include introduction of sales tax in 1969, enacting of new income tax legislation in 1973, amendment of the existing tax legislation to revise the tax bases and rates, abolition of some excise duty in 1979 and export duty in 1985/86, re-introduction of previously abolished excise duty in 1989.

In recognition of the continued poor functioning of the tax system and the need to look at the tax system as a whole, the Government appointed a Tax Commission in October 1989. The Commission's primary task was to study and review the central and local government tax system and its administration, and make recommendations to the government. Specifically, it was to recommend changes to the existing tax system to widen the tax base, enhance revenue collections, and promote greater efficiency of production in the economy. The Commission's report was presented to the Government in December 1991.

The commission recommended, among other things, broadening of tax bases by taxing fringe benefits and improve compliance by more effective enforcement, reduction of individuals' and companies' income tax rates and apply the rates on broader bases, making adjustments for the effects of inflation, replace a multiple-rate structure of sales and excise taxes by a value-added-tax (VAT) and a limited number of excises on traditional excisable goods and luxury items, simplifying the customs duties by reducing the number of rates, and reducing exemptions from both customs and sales taxes.

This "low-rate, broad-base" strategy was considered to be more consistent in practice with both efficient resource allocation and equity than the "high-rate, narrow-base" pattern that had dominated the Tanzanian tax system in the past.

== Current Tax Regime ==
Basically Taxation in Tanzania is in form two types of taxes. Each type is classified according to the legal and effective incidence to the final payer. These two types are direct and indirect taxes.

=== Direct taxes ===
These are taxes levied directly on people's income from employment, business or ownership of property and an investment. The impact and incidence of the tax falls on the same person i.e. incidence cannot be shifted to another person e.g. Corporate tax, Pay-as-you-earn tax (PAYE) and withholding taxes.

=== Corporation Tax ===
This is a tax, which is paid from corporate profits. Companies or entities have to prepare final accounts, which must be approved by authorized Auditors, and Accountants recognized by both NBAA and TRA. These accounts are submitted to TRA on the prescribed accounting date. All companies whether resident or non-resident are required by the Income Tax laws to file an estimate of income within three months after the start of its accounting year. The firm is supposed to pay tax based on four installments. Six months after the accounting period, the firm must file a final tax return to TRA. The current corporation tax rate is 30% and 10% for new assemblers of vehicles, tractors and fishing boats for the initial 5 years from commencement of operation. Income of companies newly listed on the Dar es Salaam Stock Exchange (DSE) is taxed at 25% or three consecutive years. Income of new manufacturers of pharmaceutical or leather products having performance agreements with Tanzania’s government is taxed at 20% for the first five years.

=== Individual Income Tax ===
Individuals include sole traders and salaried people who are taxed at progressive individual income tax rate, which varies from the lowest marginal rate of 8% to the top marginal rate of 30%. However, for a non-resident individual the applicable rate is 20%, which is charged on the total income. The table below shows the current resident individuals tax rates. Sole traders are also required by the law to file estimate of income within 3 months of the new accounting year. they are taxed based on presumptive tax system, where the tax payable on estimates depends on annual turnover/sales, and not profit.

=== Indirect taxes ===
These are taxes, which are based on consumption. Examples of such taxes are like Import Duty, Excise Duty, and Value Added Tax (VAT), etc. By definition the legal incidence of the tax falls on the trader who acts as a collection agent of the government while the effective incidence falls on the final consumer of goods or services who eventually pays the tax.

=== Value Added Tax (VAT) ===
Value Added Tax is a consumption tax charged by VAT registered traders on all taxable goods and services at a standard rate of 18%. The VAT is a multistage tax levied at each stage of production and distribution up to the retail stage. The tax is also levied on taxable imports made by persons whether or not registered for VAT. All exports are zero rated (0%).

==== VAT Registration requirements ====
1. All traders or businesses whose taxable turnover exceeds TSh 200 millions per annum or 100 million in period of six months ending at the end of the previous months.

2. Professional service providers such as accountants, lawyers, engineers, and related consultancies irrespective of their turnover registered under laws of the United Republic of Tanzania.

all the above are obliged to apply for registration to the Commissioner for Domestic Revenue within thirty (30) days of becoming liable to make such application.

Application for VAT registration is done by filling the application form online or manually and TRA inspect the business site before approving any registration. One registered, the taxpayer is required to submit monthly VAT returns either with payment, repayment or a nil return before 20th of the month following the month of business.

Some persons and institutions are relieved from the payment of VAT on supplies or on importation of taxable goods and services, while some goods services are specifically exempted from VAT.

== Compliance requirements ==
The compliance requirements are of two kinds. The first is filing of returns and the second is payment of the tax. In most cases, the deadlines for payment of taxes fall on the same date that the respective return is due.

=== Filing of returns and payment of taxes ===
==== 1. Statement of Estimated Tax Payable by Instalment (SETPI) ====
A taxpayer is expected to self-assess and submit his potential income for the year ahead on or before 31 March. They are expected to pay the tax they have self-assed by four equal instalments on or before 31 March, 30 June, 30 September and 31 December.

==== 2. Return of Income ====
The Tanzania Revenue Authority (TRA) requires taxpayers in Tanzania to file their "return of income" each year before 30 June. The return of income is a document that taxpayers must submit to the tax authority, providing details about their income, deductions, and taxes owed for the specific financial year. It includes information about various sources of income, allowable deductions, and credits that help calculate the final tax liability or potential refund. Filing the return on time and accurately is crucial to avoid penalties and comply with Tanzania's tax regulations.

==== 3. Statement and Payment of Tax Withheld for Employees ====
Every month an employer is expected to withhold tax from the taxable salaries paid to the employees. A return related to this tax should be filed on or before 7th day of the following month. Filing of the return is obligatory irrespective of the fact that the taxpayer have any tax liability or not.

== See also ==
- List of countries by tax rates
- List of countries by tax revenue as percentage of GDP
