= Tanzania Commercial Bank =

Commercial bank in Tanzania

- Type: Government Owned
- Industry: Financial services
- Founded: 1925; 101 years ago
- Headquarters: LAPF Towers; Bagamoyo Road; Dar-es-salaam, Tanzania
- Key people: Edmund B. Mndolwa (chairman Adam Mihayo (CEO)
- Products: Loans, savings, checking, investments, debit cards, credit cards, mortgages
- Net income: ▲ (aftertax) TSh 10.7 billion (US$4.5 million) (Q1 2024)
- Total assets: TSh 1.37 trillion (US$570.36 million) (2023)
- Number of employees: 925 (2019)
- Website: Homepage

Tanzania Commercial Bank, formerly known as TPB Bank Plc, is a commercial bank in Tanzania. It is licensed and supervised by the Bank of Tanzania, the central bank, and the national banking regulator.

== History ==
=== Incorporation ===
In 1925, the Tanganyika Post Office Savings Bank Ordinance was passed by the British Colonial government, which established the Tanganyika Post Office Savings Bank. The bank became operational in just two years in 1927. There were plans to list the shares of the bank on the Dar es Salaam Stock Exchange, but those plans never materialized.

=== Financial sector reform ===
After the government of Tanzania began financial sector reform following the end of Ujamaa economic policies in the country, the Tanzania Post office Savings Bank was transformed into a separate entity, the Tanzania Postal Bank. The Tanzania Postal Bank Act No. 11 of 1991 created the bank as a separate entity from the Tanzania Posts and Telecommunications Corporation. Since attaining its independence, the bank has provided services to a much larger population, and it has begun to provide a profit to the government.

=== Public limited company ===
In 2015, the bank management declared that the bank would list the bank on the Dar es Salaam Stock Exchange, to raise capital to expand and automate the company's operations.

On January 19, 2017, the bank officially rebranded the company, and Tanzania Postal Bank Limited changed its name to TPB Bank Plc.

=== Mergers and acquisitions ===
In 2018, the Bank of Tanzania merged Twiga Bancorp and Tanzania Women's Bank into Tanzania Postal Bank due to their poor performance. In June 2020, the central bank merged TIB Commercial Bank Limited into TPB. The merger was set to bring the total assets of the bank to over 1 trillion Tanzanian shillings.

== Overview ==
In June 2021, the bank rebranded to Tanzania Commercial Bank, to reflect the national nature of the institution. As of December 2023, the bank's total assets were valued at TSh 1.47 trillion (approx. US$570.36 million).

== Corporate affairs ==
=== Ownership ===
The table below illustrates the shareholding in the stock of TPB Bank Plc, as of 31 December 2019.

TPB Bank stock ownership
Rank	Name of owner	Percentage ownership
1	Government of Tanzania	83.00
2	Tanzania Posts Corporation	8.00
3	Revolutionary Government of Zanzibar	3.00
4	TP & TC Savings and Credit Society	3.00
5	PSSSF	2.00
6	Workers' Compensation Fund (WCF)	1.00
	Total	100.00

=== Business trends ===
TPB Bank Plc bank year ends on 31 December.

	2012	2013	2014	2015	2016	2017	2018
Total revenue (TSh billion)	31.10	38.48	53.22	74.49	91.67	106.8	118.3
Interest income (TSh billion)	20.87	26.60	34.75	49.43	66.81	83.0	96.0
Profit after tax (TSh billion)	4.07	4.74	6.77	8.27	10.81	12.7	12.7
Total assets (TSh billion)	167.3	200.8	297.8	370.7	400.8	458.3	562
Number of branches	28	28	28	28			
Number of employees	444	454	574	660	700	718	888
Notes/sources							

== See also ==
- List of banks in Tanzania
