= Azania Bank =

Tanzanian commercial bank

- Type: Private
- Industry: Financial services
- Founded: 1995; 31 years ago
- Headquarters: Dar-es-Salaam, Tanzania
- Key people: Godius Kahyarara, chairman; Esther Mang’enya, managing director
- Products: Loans, checking, savings, investments, debit cards
- Total assets: TSh 2,098 billion (US$822.7 million) (September 2023)
- Number of employees: 511 (2019)
- Website: www.azaniabank.co.tz

Azania Bank PLC , commonly referred to as Azania Bank, is a commercial bank in Tanzania. Its former name was First Adili Bancorp Limited. It is licensed by the Bank of Tanzania (BOT), the central bank and national banking regulator.

== Overview ==
Azania Bank is a Tier One-sized commercial bank that engages in retail banking, corporate banking, lease financing, foreign exchange transactions, import/export financing, and the issuance of letters of credit. Following the acquisition of the assets and liabilities of Bank M, in January 2019, the total assets of Azania Bank were valued at approximately TSh 1,339 billion (US$582 million). At that time the bank's shareholders equity was valued at TSh 164 billion (US$71.46 million). As of December 2019, the bank's total assets were valued at 1,148,710,000,000/= (US$496,575,000), with shareholders equity of 241,351,000,000/= (US$104,333,000).

== History ==
The bank was established in 1995 as First Adili Bancorp, by Tanzanian citizens, together with national pension funds and International financial institutions, including the East African Development Bank, the Swedish International Development Agency and an American merchant bank, Gerald Metals Inc. Today, the main shareholders are Tanzanian pension funds and Tanzanian nationals.

In January 2019, Azania Bank acquired the assets and liabilities of Bank M, a retail commercial bank, which had been under management by Bank of Tanzania since August 2018, on account of "critical liquidity problems" and inability "to meet its obligations".

== Ownership ==
As of December 2021, Azania Bank's stock was owned by the following corporate entities and individuals:

Azania Bank stock ownership
Rank	Name of owner	Percentage ownership
1	National Social Security Fund - Tanzania (NSSF)	28.04
2	Public Service Social Security Fund (PSSSF)	51.32
3	National Health Insurance Fund (NHIF)	17.97
4	Workers Compensation Fund (WCF)	1.78
5	East African Development Bank (EADB)	0.50
6	Minority shareholders, including Azania Bank staff	0.39
	Total	100.0

== Branch network ==
Azania Bank has its headquarters in Dar-es-Salaam. As of December 2021, the bank maintained a network of branches at the following locations:

- Masdo Branch - Samora Avenue, Dar es Salaam
- Kariakoo Branch - Msimbazi Street, Dar es Salaam
- Kisutu Branch - Kisutu, Dar es Salaam
- Tegeta Branch - Chief House, Tegeta, Dar es Salaam
- Mwenge Branch - Mwenge Market, Dar es Salaam
- Mawasiliano Agency - Sam Nujoma Road, Dar es Salaam
- Industrial Branch - Nyerere Road, Dar es Salaam
- Lumumba Branch - Lumumba Street, Dar es Salaam
- Mwaloni Branch - Mwaloni Fish Market, Mwanza
- Rockcity Branch - Makongoro Street, Mwanza
- Rwagasore Agency - Rwagasore Street, Mwanza
- Lamadi Agency - Lamadi, Simiyu
- Kahama Branch - Kahama Central Business District, Shinyanga District
- Kagongwa Agency - Iponya Street, Kahama, Shinyanga
- Arusha City Branch - WaKaloleni Street, Arusha
- Mbauda Branch - Mbauda Corner, Arusha-Dodoma Road, Arusha
- Arusha Business Centre - Joel Maeda Street, Arusha
- Moshi Branch - Opp. Moshi Municipal Offices, Moshi
- Geita Branch - Geita
- Geita Mineral Centre - Kalangalala Street, Geita
- Katoro Branch - Geita
- Nyarugusu Service Centre - Geita
- Morogoro Branch - Old Dar es Salaam rd Street, Morogoro
- Sokoine Branch - Kikuyu Avenue, Dodoma
- Tunduma Branch - Sumbawanga Road, Tunduma
- Mbeya City Branch - Karume Avenue Road, Mbeya

== Governance ==
Azania Bank is governed by an eleven-person board of directors, of whom one is an executive director and ten are non-executive. The chairman of the board is Eng. Julius Ndyamukama, one of the non-executive directors. The managing director of Azania Bank is Esther Mangénya.

== See also ==
- Economy of Tanzania
- List of banks in Tanzania
