= First Housing Company Tanzania Limited =

First Housing Finance (Tanzania) Limited
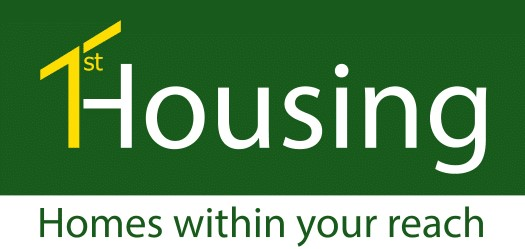
- Industry: Financial services
- Founded: 2017
- Headquarters: Dar es Salaam, Tanzania
- Key people: Sasa M. Chonza; Chief Executive Officer
- Products: Mortgages
- Total assets: TSh 21.8 billion (US$10 million) (Q3:2017)
- Website: www.firsthousing.co.tz

First Housing Finance (Tanzania) Limited, is a mortgage bank in Tanzania. It is licensed by the Bank of Tanzania, the country's central bank and national banking regulator, to engage in mortgage lending. It is Tanzania's first dedicated mortgage lender.

== Location ==
The headquarters of the mortgage lender are located in Dar es Salaam, the business center and largest city in Tanzania.

== Overview ==
The bank is a greenfield start-up that received a banking license from the Bank of Tanzania in July 2017. The establishment of the bank is a joint effort by Azania Bank Limited, a commercial bank in Tanzania together with two deep-pocketed private Tanzanian investors and two international corporations, the International Finance Corporation and India's mortgage conglomerate, Housing Development Finance Corporation Limited.

The new lender plans to start with four mortgage products (a) home purchase loans (b) home improvement loans (c) home expansion mortgages. The financial products will be amortized for up to twenty five years.

== Shareholding ==
The bank's stock is privately owned by the following individuals and corporate entities:

First Housing Company Tanzania Limited Stock Ownership
Rank	Name of Owner	Percentage Ownership
1	Azania Bank Limited	40.0
2	Housing Development Finance Corporation of India	15.0
3	International Finance Corporation	15.0
4	Sanjay Suchak of Tanzania	15.0
5	Karimjee Family of Tanzania	15.0
	Total	100.00

== See also ==
- List of banks in Tanzania
- Bank of Tanzania
- Economy of Tanzania
- Oriental Commercial Bank
