= Tanzania Women's Bank Limited =

- Company type: Public Limited Liability Company
- Traded as: DSE: TWB
- Industry: Financial services
- Founded: 2007
- Headquarters: Dar es Salaam, Tanzania
- Key people: Japhet Justine; Managing Director
- Products: Loans, Savings, Checking, Investments, Debit Cards, Credit Cards, Mortgages
- Website: Homepage

Tanzania Women Bank Limited (TWBL) is a Tanzanian bank that specialises in providing financial services to women. It is listed as a "Registered Financial Institution" by the Bank of Tanzania, the central bank and national banking regulator.

== Overview ==
The bank is a small financial institution in Tanzania. As of January 2016, the bank's shareholders' equity was valued at TSh 8.5 billion (approx. US$4 million).

== History ==
The idea to start a Women's Bank in Tanzania began in 1999, when a number of female entrepreneurs approached the then President of Tanzania, Benjamin William Mkapa, with the idea. Eight years later, in 2007, the Tanzania Women's Bank Limited (TWBL) was created. The bank officially opened for business on 28 July 2009. TWB's aim is to empower women economically and socially. It serves all segments of society including low income earners, large corporations and small and medium enterprises (SMEs).

== Ownership ==
From the time of its creation, in 2007, as a private limited liability company, 97% of the shareholding in the stock of the bank was owned by the Government of Tanzania. The remaining 3% was owned by private institutions and individuals. In August 2012, the Tanzanian government began the process of listing the shares of the bank's stock on the Dar es Salaam Stock Exchange (DSE), through the issuance of an initial public offering (IPO). The bank changed its official name to Tanzania Women's Bank Public Limited Company, in keeping with the change in ownership to a public limited liability company. The shares of TWB were listed on the DSE in 2012.

== Branch network ==
As of November 2014, the bank maintains branches at the following locations:

1. Mkwepu Branch – Old Post Office Building, Mkwepu Street, Dar es Salaam
2. Kariakoo Branch – Aggrey Likoma Street, Dar es Salaam
3. Dodoma Branch – Posta/TTCL Building, Railway Road, Dodoma
4. Mwanza Branch – Old Post Office Building, Posta Road, Mwanza

== See also ==
- Tanzania Banks
- Bank of Tanzania
- Economy of Tanzania
