= Bank M =

Tanzanian commercial bank

- Type: Private
- Industry: Financial services
- Founded: 2007; 19 years ago
- Fate: Closed, August 2018
- Headquarters: Dar es Salaam, Tanzania
- Key people: Nimrod Mkono; Chairman; Jacqueline Woiso; Chief Executive Officer
- Products: Loans, checking, savings, investments, debit cards
- Revenue: ▲ Pretax: TSh 12.66 billion (US$8.04 million) (2012)
- Total assets: TSh 1.05 trillion (US$461.4 million) (2016)
- Number of employees: 213+ (2012)
- Website: www.bankm.co.tz.

Bank M was a commercial bank in Tanzania. It was licensed by the Bank of Tanzania, the country's central bank and national banking regulator, to engage in commercial banking.

== Location ==
The headquarters and main branch of Bank M were located at the Bank M Building, at 8 Barack Obama Drive (former Ocean Road), in the city of Dar es Salaam, th large city and financial capital of Tanzania. The geographical coordinates of the headquarters of the bank are: 06°48'09.0"S, 39°17'12.0"E (Latitude:-6.802500; Longitude:39.286667).

== Overview ==
The bank was a medium-sized financial services provider in Tanzania. It provided financial services to individuals, small to medium enterprises, and large corporations. As of June 2013, the bank's total asset base was valued at about TSh 532 billion (US$336.2 million).

== History ==
The bank received its commercial banking license from the Bank of Tanzania in February 2007 and opened for business in July of the same year. Its authorized capital is approximately TSh 25 billion (US$17 million), of which TSh 9.3 billion (US$6.3 million) had been paid up as of October 2010.

In January 2019, the assets and liabilities of Bank M were acquired by Azania Bank, another retail commercial bank. The banking license of Bank M was revoked by the Bank of Tanzania, the national banking regulator.

== Ownership ==
Prior to its placement into receivership in August 2018, the stock of the bank was owned by the following individuals and corporate entities.

Bank M Stock Ownership
Rank	Name of Owner	Percentage Ownership
1	Vimal Mehta	16.03
2	Equity & Allied Limited	12.17
3	Sean Patrick Breslin	11.63
4	Africarriers Limited	11.00
5	Sanjeev	10.53
6	Noble Azania Investment Limited	7.30
7	Khaskar Nair	7.09
8	Sumaria Properties Limited	4.87
9	Simon & Roisin Gregory	4.45
10	Pride Tanzania Limited	3.46
11	Ramesh Patel	3.26
12	Gissings Directors Pension Scheme	2.47
13	Shiva Sanjeev Kumar	1.42
14	Caitrin Breslin	0.90
	Total	100.00

- Note: Totals may be slightly off due to rounding.

== Branch Network ==
As of November 2014, Bank M maintains branches in the following locations, with a view to expand to other areas of Tanzania: (1) Main Branch - 8 Barack Obama Drive, Dar es Salaam (2) Nyerere Road Branch - 27-28 Nyerere Road, Dar es Salaam (3) Kisutu Street Branch - 29 Kisutu Street, Dar es Salaam (4) Uhuru Street Branch - 27 Uhuru Street, Dar es Salaam (5) Arusha Branch - 29 East Joel Maeda Road, Arusha (6) Mwanza Branch - 62W Capri Point, Mwanza.

== Receivership ==
On 2 August 2018, the Bank of Tanzania, seized Bank M, dismissed its board of directors and senior managers and appointed an administrator; thus placing the lender under "receivership", on account of failure to meet liquidity requirements. A decision on the way forward was expected in the next 90 days.

In January 2019, BOT transferred the assets of Bank M, estimated at US$500 million at the time, to Azania Bank and permanently revoked Bank M's commercial banking license.

== See also ==
- List of banks in Tanzania
- Bank of Tanzania
- Economy of Tanzania
- Oriental Commercial Bank
