= Akiba Commercial Bank =

Tanzania Bank based in Dar es Salaam

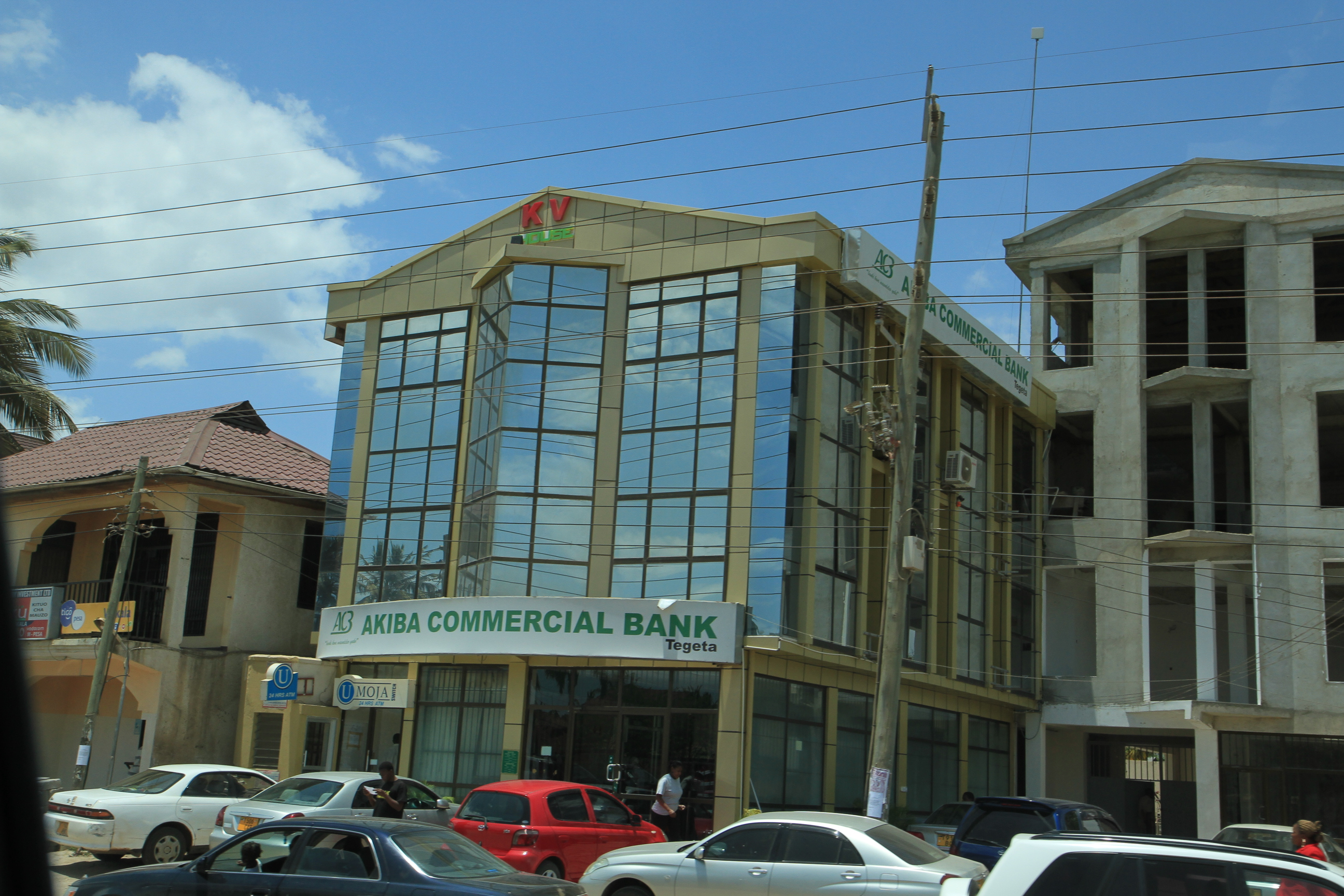
- Type: Private company
- Industry: Financial services
- Founded: August 1997; 29 years ago
- Headquarters: Dar es Salaam, Tanzania
- Key people: Ernest Massawe (chairman); Juliana Swai (Ag. managing director)
- Products: Loans, transaction accounts, savings, investments, debit cards
- Revenue: ▲Aftertax: TSh 8.36 billion (US$3.68 million) (2016)
- Total assets: TSh 169.4 billion (US$72.64 million) (2019)
- Website: www.acbtz.com

Akiba Commercial Bank (ACB) is a commercial bank in Tanzania. It is licensed by the Bank of Tanzania, the central bank and national banking regulator.

== Overview ==
The bank is a retail commercial bank with a specific focus on serving the poorest Tanzanians and their enterprises. It operates as a microfinance bank. As of 2019, its total assets were valued at TSh 169.4 billion (approximately US$72.64 million), with shareholders' equity of TSh 21.4 billion (approximately US$9.18 million). In 2013, Akiba Commercial Bank was ranked "the best customer-focused bank in Tanzania" due to its convenience, customer care and pricing.

The headquarters of Akiba Commercial Bank are located at Amani Place, along Ohio Street, in the central business district of the city of Dar es Salaam, the financial capital and largest city in Tanzania. The geographical coordinates of the bank's headquarters are: 06°48'42.0"S, 39°17'16.0"E (Latitude:-6.811667; Longitude:39.287778).

As of 2016, Akiba Commercial Bank operated a network of branches in Dar es Salaam, Arusha, Dodoma, Mwanza and other urban centers in the country.

The board of directors of the bank comprises eight individuals. The chairman is one of the seven non-executive directors. The Managing director and chief executive officer (CEO) is answerable to the board.

== History ==
Akiba Commercial Bank was established in 1997 by Tanzanian business people with the objective of serving the banking needs of the poorest of Tanzanians, who were hitherto unbanked and not served by the large commercial banks. It opened its doors that year, after receiving a commercial banking license from the Bank of Tanzania. The majority of Akiba's shares are owned by individual Tanzanians. Akiba maintains a management agreement with Accion, primarily covering the areas of product design, marketing and training.

== Ownership ==
The stock of Akiba Commercial Bank is privately owned by individuals and corporate entities including the following, as of 31 December 2016.

Akiba Commercial Bank stock ownership
Rank	Name of owner	Percentage ownership
1	ACCION Investments	20.00
2	Parastatal Pension Fund of Tanzania	11.0
3	Stitching Hivos-Triodos Fonds	8.0
4	Incofin CVSO of Belgium	7.0
5	Netherlands Development Finance Company (FMO)	7.0
6	InterConsult Limited of Tanzania	6.0
7	Fonds Européen de Financement Solidaire pour l’Afrique (FEFISOL) of Luxembourg	5.0
8	Stitching-Triodos Financial Management	5.0
9	Erncon Holdings Limited of Tanzania	5.0
10	Tanzania Development Finance	3.0
11	Other investors	23.0
	Total	100.00

== See also ==
- List of banks in Tanzania
- List of banks in Africa
- Bank of Tanzania
- Economy of Tanzania
