= International Commercial Bank Tanzania =

Commercial bank in Tanzania

Coordinates: 06°48′49″S 39°16′40″E

International Commercial Bank Tanzania Limited
- Type: Private, subsidiary of ICB Banking Group
- Industry: Financial services
- Founded: 1997; 29 years ago
- Headquarters: Vijana Towers, 2nd Floor, Fire Station Road, West Upanga, Dar es Salaam, Tanzania
- Key people: Josephine Sevaretnam, chairperson Villy Vellayappan, managing director
- Products: Loans, checking, savings, investments, debit cards
- Total assets: TSh 79.546 billion (US$34.5 million) (2019)
- Parent: ICB Banking Group
- Website: icbank.co.tz

International Commercial Bank Tanzania Limited (ICBT) is a commercial bank in Tanzania, the third-largest economy in the East African Community. It is licensed by the Bank of Tanzania, the country's central bank and national banking regulator.

== Overview ==
The bank is a member of the ICB Banking Group, a financial services conglomerate, headquartered in Schindellegi, Switzerland, with subsidiaries in Tanzania and Bangladesh.

In the past, ICB Banking Group owned banking subsidiaries in thirteen countries in Eastern Europe, Asia and Africa. The group has since divested from those countries, except for the two, mentioned in the previous paragraph.

As of December 2019, ICB Tanzania Limited owned total assets valued at TSh 79.546 billion (US$34.5 million), with shareholders equity of TSh 20.079 billion (US$8.7 million).

== Ownership ==
ICB Tanzania Limited is majority owned by ICB Banking Group of Switzerland, and four non-Tanzanian minority shareholders. The table below illustrates the shareholding in the stock of International Commercial Bank Tanzania, as of November 2020.

ICB Tanzania Limited stock ownership
Rank	Name of owner	Nationality	Percentage ownership
1	ICB Financial Group Holding AG	Switzerland	75.08
2	Josephine Sivaretnam	Malaysia	6.23
3	Khadijah Abdul Khalid	Malaysia	6.23
4	Lutfiah Binti Ismail	Malaysia	6.23
5	Mohd Nasir Bin Ali	Malaysia	6.23
	Total		100.00

== Governance ==
The seven-person board of directors is chaired by Josephine Sevaretnam, a non-executive board member, who is also a minority shareholder. As of September 2020, Villy Vellayappan serves as the chief executive officer of the bank. He is assisted by nine other top managers in conducting the day-to-day business of the financial institution.

== See also ==
- List of banks in Tanzania
- List of banks in Africa
- Economy of Tanzania
