= Emmanuel Tutuba =

Tanzanian economist

8th Governor of the Bank of Tanzania
- Incumbent
- Assumed office 9 January 2023
- Appointed by: Samia Suluhu Hassan
- Preceded by: Florens Luoga

Permanent Secretary in the Ministry of Finance and Planning
- In office 5 April 2021 – 7 January 2023
- Appointed by: Samia Suluhu
- Preceded by: Dotto James
- Succeeded by: Natu El-Maamry Mwamba

Personal details
- Born: 30 March 1973 (age 53) Buhigwe District, Kigoma Region
- Education: Mzumbe University

Emmanuel Mpawe Tutuba (born 30 March 1973) is the eighth Governor of the Bank of Tanzania.

== Early life and career ==
He completed his A-Levels in 1994 at Milambo Secondary School in Tabora Region having studied economics, geography and mathematics. From 1996 to 1999, he pursued his Advance Diploma in Economic Planning at the Institute of Development Studies at Mzumbe University; followed by an MBA in Corporate Management and graduating from the same alma mater in 2001.

In February 2020, President John Magufuli appointed him as the Regional Administrative Secretary (RAS) for Mwanza Region.

On 4 April 2021, he was appointed by President Samia Suluhu Hassan as the Permanent Secretary in the Ministry of Finance and Planning.

On 7 January 2023, he was appointed as the 8th Governor of Tanzania's central bank and was sworn in on 9 January 2023.
