= Amana Bank (Tanzania) =

Amana Bank Limited
- Company type: Private
- Industry: Islamic Financial services
- Founded: 2011; 15 years ago
- Headquarters: 2nd Floor, Golden Jubilee Tower, Ohio Street, Dar es Salaam, Tanzania
- Number of locations: 10 branches
- Key people: Abubakar Athman, managing director
- Products: Financing, Transaction accounts, Savings, Investments, Debit Cards
- Revenue: ▲After Tax:TSh 5.95 billion (US$2.4 million) (2024)
- Total assets: TSh 306 billion (US$124 million) (2024)
- Number of employees: 351+ (2024)
- Website: Bank website

Amana Bank is a commercial bank in Tanzania. It is licensed by the Bank of Tanzania, the central bank and national banking regulator.

== Location ==
The headquarters and main branch of Amana Bank are located in Golden Jubilee Tower, along Garden Avenue, in the central business district of the city of Dar es Salaam, the largest city and financial capital of Tanzania. The geographical coordinates of Golden Jubilee Tower are: 06°48'49.0"S, 39°17'21.0"E (Latitude:-6.813611; Longitude:39.289167).

== History ==
Amana Bank was established in 2011 with paid-up capital of TSh 27 billion (approx. US$12.6 million in 2016 money). It is the first fully Sharia-compliant bank in Tanzania. The discussions to establish this bank date back to October 2009, among prominent Tanzanian business personalities.

== Branch network ==
As of September 2018, the bank maintained branches at the following locations:

1. Headquarters Branch: 2nd Floor, Golden Jubilee Tower, Ohio Street, Dar es Salaam Main Branch
2. Nyerere Branch: DRTC House, Nyerere Road, Dar es Salaam
3. Lumumba Branch: Lumumba Street, Kariakoo, Dar es Salaam
4. Mbagala Branch: Mbagala Zakhem, Mbagala, Dar es Salaam
5. Tandamti Branch: Tandamti Street, Opposite Kariakoo Market, Dar es Salaam
6. Arusha Branch: Ground Floor, Hugo Plaza Building, Corner of Wapare Street & Majengo Street, Arusha
7. Mwanza Branch: Ground Floor, Plot no 231, Block T, Kenyatta Street, Mwanza
8. Tanga Branch - North East side of Uhuru Park, Market Street, Tanga
9. Zanzibar Branch - Zanzibar
10. Dodoma Branch - Mbeya Avenue (In Development)
11. Pemba Branch - Pemba (In Development)

== See also ==
- List of banks in Tanzania
- List of banks in Africa
- Bank of Tanzania
- Economy of Tanzania
