= People's Bank of Zanzibar =

Commercial bank in Tanzania

The People's Bank of Zanzibar Limited
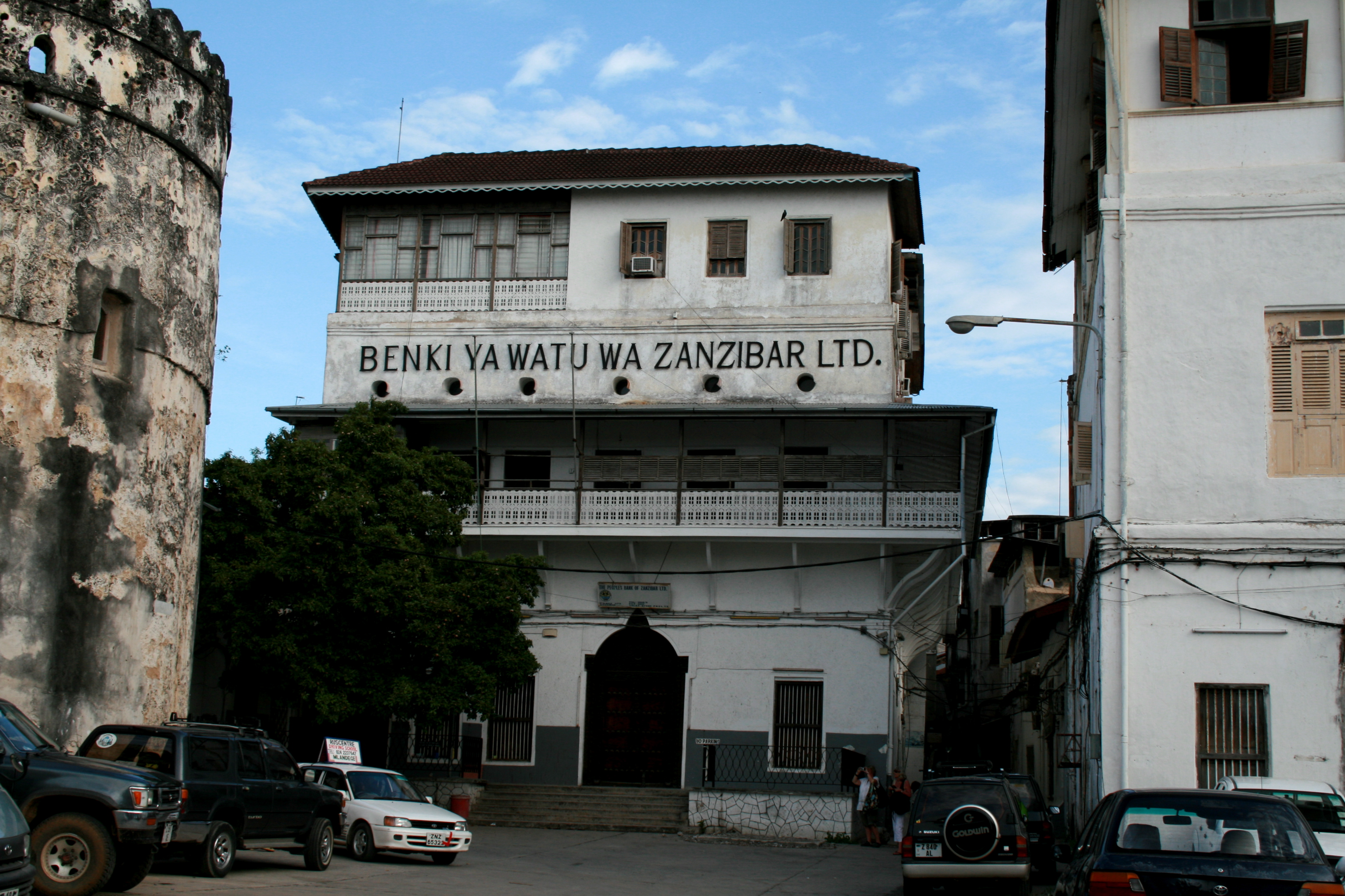
- Company type: 100% Government Owned
- Industry: Financial services
- Founded: 30th June, 1966
- Headquarters: ZIC Building, Mpirani, Zanzibar, Tanzania
- Key people: Dr. Estella Ngoma; Chairwoman; Dr. Muhsin Salim managing director
- Products: Loans, savings, checking, investments, debit cards, credit cards, mortgages, Islamic Financing
- Revenue: TSh 82,906,799,921/= (Dec 2020)
- Net income: TSh 18,350,163,377/= (Dec 2020)
- Total assets: TSh 752,829,295,205/= (Dec 2020)
- Number of employees: 501 (Dec 2020)
- Website: Company website

The People's Bank of Zanzibar (PBZ) is a commercial bank in Tanzania. It is licensed by the Bank of Tanzania, the central bank and national banking regulator.

== Overview ==
As of June 2014, PBZ was a medium-sized financial institution, with total assets of approximately TSh 321.35 billion. At that time, the bank's shareholders' equity was about TSh 29.6 billion. The bank employed 236 full-time staff as of 30 June 2014.

== History ==
The bank was founded in 1966 by the government of Zanzibar. It functions as a retail bank, serving individuals, small and medium enterprises (SMEs), and large corporate clients. Initially, its service area was limited to the islands of Zanzibar and Pemba.

In April 2011, the bank opened a branch in Dar es Salaam on the mainland. As of May 2012, it planned new branches in Mwanza, Arusha, Mtwara, and Mbeya.

In December 2011, the bank launched an Islamic bank window, in addition to the conventional banking services that it offers.

== Ownership ==
PBZ is wholly owned by the government of Zanzibar.

== Branch network ==
As of November 2014, The Peoples Bank of Zanzibar Limited maintains 11 branches at the following locations:

1. Malindi Branch - Near Ministry of Agriculture, Zanzibar Main Branch
2. Chake Chake Branch - Chake-Chake, Pemba
3. Forodhani Branch - Forodhani Park, Zanzibar
4. Mwanakwerekwe Branch - Mwanakwerekwe, Zanzibar
5. Mkoani Branch - Zanzibar Port Authority Building, Zanzibar
6. Wete Branch - Ground Floor, Zanzibar Electricity Corporation Building, Zanzibar
7. Mlandege Branch - Muzammil Building, Mlandege
8. Kariakoo Branch - Opposite Kariakoo Main Market, Zanzibar
9. Dar es Salaam Branch I - Mbagala, Dar es Salaam
10. Tazara Branch - Dar es Salaam, Junction of TAZARA
11. Mtwara Branch - Mtwara

== See also ==
- List of banks in Tanzania
- Bank of Tanzania
- Economy of Tanzania
- Islamic banking
