= Coat of arms of Tanzania =

- Armiger: United Republic of Tanzania
- Adopted: 6 May 1971
- Shield: On a native shield, per fess of four: Or, the top part of a Torch enflamed proper; Flag of Tanzania: Per bend sinister Vert and Azure, a bend sinister Sable, fimbriated Or; Gules, an Axe and Hatchet in saltire Or; Barry wavy Argent and Azure; over all a Spear over an Axe and Hatchet in saltire, all Or.
- Supporters: A representation of Mount Kilimanjaro. Elephant tusks are supported by a man and a woman, with a clove bush at the feet of the man and a cotton bush at the feet of the woman.
- Motto: Uhuru na Umoja "Freedom and Unity" (Swahili)

The coat of arms of Tanzania comprises a warrior's shield which bears a golden portion on the upper part followed underneath by the flag of Tanzania.

The golden portion represents minerals in the United Republic; the red portion underneath the flag symbolises the rich fertile soil of Africa; and the wavy bands represent the land, sea, lakes and coastal lines of the United Republic.

In the golden part of the flag, there appears a burning torch signifying freedom (Uhuru), enlightenment and knowledge; a spear signifying defence of freedom and crossed axe and hoe being tools that the people of Tanzania use in developing the country.

The shield stands upon the representation of Mount Kilimanjaro. Elephant tusks are supported by a man and a woman, with a clove bush at the feet of the man and a cotton bush at the feet of the woman (whose head is covered with a golden scarf) indicating the theme of co-operation.

The United Republic motto below –Uhuru na Umoja– is written in Swahili and means "Freedom and Unity".

== History ==
The coat of arms of Tanzania was inspired by that of the Republic of Tanganyika. While the Tanganyika flag ("Independence Flag") was adopted by decree on the day of independence, 9 December 1961, the flag, coat of arms and public seal were adopted into law on the first anniversary of independence in 1962. On the Day of Union, just prior to mixing the soils of Tanganyika and Zanzibar, President Nyerere decreed the Emblem of Tanganyika would become the Emblem of Tanzania. In time a new emblem, from that of Tanganyika, was created that included the new Tanzanian flag adopted on the Day of Union. The new flag and coat of arms of the Union were adopted into law in 1971.

It is unknown who created the design. There are three well known claimants.

- Francis Maige Kanyasu (known as Ngosha) claimed to have created it with colleagues in 1957.
- Jeremiah Wisdom Kabati whose family claim he created while teaching in Tabora in 1960. In years following Ngosha's death in 2017 it is suggested Teacher Kabati and Mr Kanysau collaborated on the emblem in Mwanza in the late 1950s.
- Abdalah Farahani, of Zanzibar, claimed to have created it in 1964.

== Related coats of arms ==
Emblem of the Sultanate of Zanzibar

Coat of arms of The German East Africa Company

Proposed Coat of arms of German East Africa

Badge of the British trust territory of Tanganyika

Tanganyika (1961–1964)
