= Ministry of Finance and Economic Affairs =

Ministry of Finance and Economic Affairs may refer to:

- Minister of Finance and Economic Affairs (Gambia)
- Ministry of Finance and Economic Affairs (Iceland)
- Ministry of Finance and Economic Affairs (Sri Lanka)
- Ministry of Finance and Economic Affairs (Tanzania)
