= Mwanga Hakika Bank =

Commercial Bank in Tanzania

Coordinates: 06°46′34″S 39°14′39″E

- Type: Private
- Industry: Financial services
- Founded: 2020
- Headquarters: Dar es Salaam, Tanzania
- Key people: Ridhiwani Mringo (Chairman); Jagjit Singh (Managing Director)
- Products: Loans, Transaction accounts, Savings, Investments, Debit Cards
- Revenue: ▲ Aftertax: TZS:111 billion (US$44.6 million) (2022)
- Total assets: TZS:1,246 billion (approx. $500.6 million)
- Number of employees: 106 (2022)
- Website: mhbbank.co.tz

Mwanga Hakika Bank (MHB), whose official name is Mwanga Hakika Bank Limited, is a commercial bank in Tanzania. It is licensed by the Bank of Tanzania, the central bank and national banking regulator.

== Location ==
The bank's headquarters are located on the 16th Floor, Mwanga Tower, New Bagamoyo Road in Kijitonyama in the city of Dar es Salaam, Tanzania. The geographical coordinates of this location are:6°46'34.0"S, 39°14'39.0"E (Latitude:-6.776111; Longitude:39.244167).

== Overview ==
As of August 2022, the total asset base of MHB was valued at TZS:1,246 billion (approx. $500.6 million). At that time, customer deposits amounted to STZS:710 billion (approx. $285 million) and the bank's loan book totaled TZS:720 billion (approx. $289 million). The bank's maximum authorized loan amount to a single borrower was TZS:45 billion (approx. US$18,808,507). The bank employed 106 staff members in seven brick-and-mortar branches.

== History ==
Mwanga Hakika Bank was incorporated in 2019 following the merger of three Tanzanian financial institutions, namely: EFC Tanzania Microfinance Bank (EFC), Mwanga Community Bank (MCB) and Hakika Microfinance Bank (Hakika). The new commercial bank received its commercial banking license in July 2020. It serves corporate clients, small and medium enterprises and individual clients.

== Ownership ==
The shares of the bank's stock are privately owned. The table below attempts to list the owners in the three original financial institutions that merged to form the present bank. The list is not exhaustive.

Mwanga Hakika Bank Stock Ownership
Rank	Name of Owner	Percentage Ownership
1	Residents of Mwanga District in Tanzania	30%
2	Mwanga District Diasporas in Tanzania cities	20%
3	Institutions and NGOs in Mwanga District	10%
4	Local and International shareholders	25%
5	Other investors	15%
	Total	100.00

== Branch Network ==
As of August 2022, MHB maintained seven branches at the following locations:

- Two branches in the city of Dar es Salaam
- Three branches in locations in Kilimanjaro Region
- One branch in the city of Dodoma
- One Branch in the city of Arusha

== Governance ==
The bank's activities are directed by an eight-person board of directors. Ridhiwani Mringo, one of the non-executive directors is the chairman. Jagjit Singh, serves as the managing director and chief executive officer.

== See also ==
- List of banks in Tanzania
- List of banks in Africa
- Bank of Tanzania
- Economy of Tanzania
