= Amana Bank =

Amana Bank may refer to:

- Amana Bank (Sri Lanka), a commercial bank in Sri Lanka
- Amana Bank (Tanzania), a commercial bank in Tanzania
