= TIB Development Bank =

Development Bank in Tanzania

- Type: Parastatal
- Industry: Finance
- Founded: 1970; 56 years ago
- Headquarters: Plot number 3, Sam Nujoma Road, Sinza, Dar es Salaam, Tanzania
- Key people: Sosthenes L. Kewe; Chairman; Lilian M. Mbassy; Acting CEO
- Products: Loans, Equity Partnerships, Management Services, Export/Import Finance
- Revenue: ▼Aftertax: TSh 6,205,000,000 (US$2.3 million) (2023)
- Total assets: TSh425.2 billion (US$157.9 million) (2023)
- Owner: Government of Tanzania
- Number of employees: 135 (2024)
- Website: www.tib.co.tz

TIB Development Bank, formerly known as Tanzania Investment Bank (TIB), is a government-owned development bank in Tanzania. The bank is the first development finance institution established by the Government of Tanzania. The activities of TIB are supervised by the Bank of Tanzania, the central bank and national banking regulator. TIB is registered as a Development Financial Institution.

== Overview ==
As of 31 December 2023, the bank's total assets were valued at TSh425,151,000,000 (approx. US$157.9 million), with shareholder funds valued at TSh104,278,000,000 (approx. TSh38.73 million).

== History ==
The bank was established by Act of Parliament in 1970. At that time, the main objective of TIB was to provide "medium and long-term loans to investors in commercial agriculture, manufacturing, processing, construction, transport, tourism and mining sectors". However, due to economic hardships, including a war with Idi Amin of neighboring Uganda and foreign currency exchange fluctuations within the Tanzanian economy, the bank became unable to service its financial obligations. To mitigate financial losses, TIB resorted to making short-term loans and to function like a commercial bank. The period between 1980 until 2003 was particularly hard on the bank.

== Development Financial Institution ==
Over time, the Tanzanian government, the sole shareholder in TIB, re-capitalized the bank, re-vamped its strategic development plans and re-structured its management. As of December 2010, TIB had a total asset base in excess of TSh 93 billion (US$62 million). The government intends to raise that figure to TSh 400 billion (US$265 million), in the next several years. The bank has a significant portion of its portfolio in the Tanzanian agricultural sector.

== Tanzania Investment Bank Group ==
Following the restructuring of Tanzania Investment Bank, three distinct, but related institutions were formed. The three institutions, together form the Tanzania Investment Bank Group or TIB Group:

1. TIB Development Bank Limited - A development finance institution (DFI)
2. TIB Corporate Finance Limited - A short term financing institution, serving large corporate clients, both public and private, in support of the functions of the DFI.
3. TIB Rasilimali Limited - A registered brokerage company, wholly owned by the Government of Tanzania, that purchases and sells corporate bonds on the Dar es Salaam Stock Exchange. Rasilimali also offers investment advice to the Tanzanian government in support of the DFI.

== Branches ==
The bank maintains branches at the following locations:

1. Dar es Salaam Branch - Building 3, Mlimani City Office Park, Sam Nujoma Road, Dar es Salaam
2. Mwanza Branch - 3rd Floor, PPF Plaza Building, Mwanza
3. Arusha Branch - Central Plaza Building, Sokoine Road, Arusha
4. Mbeya Branch - 28 Jakaranda Street, Mbeya
5. Dodoma Branch - Dodoma
6. Zanzibar Branch - Zanzibar

== See also ==
- Africa Banks
- Tanzania Banks
- Bank of Tanzania
- Tanzania Economy
- DFI
