= Uhuru Torch =

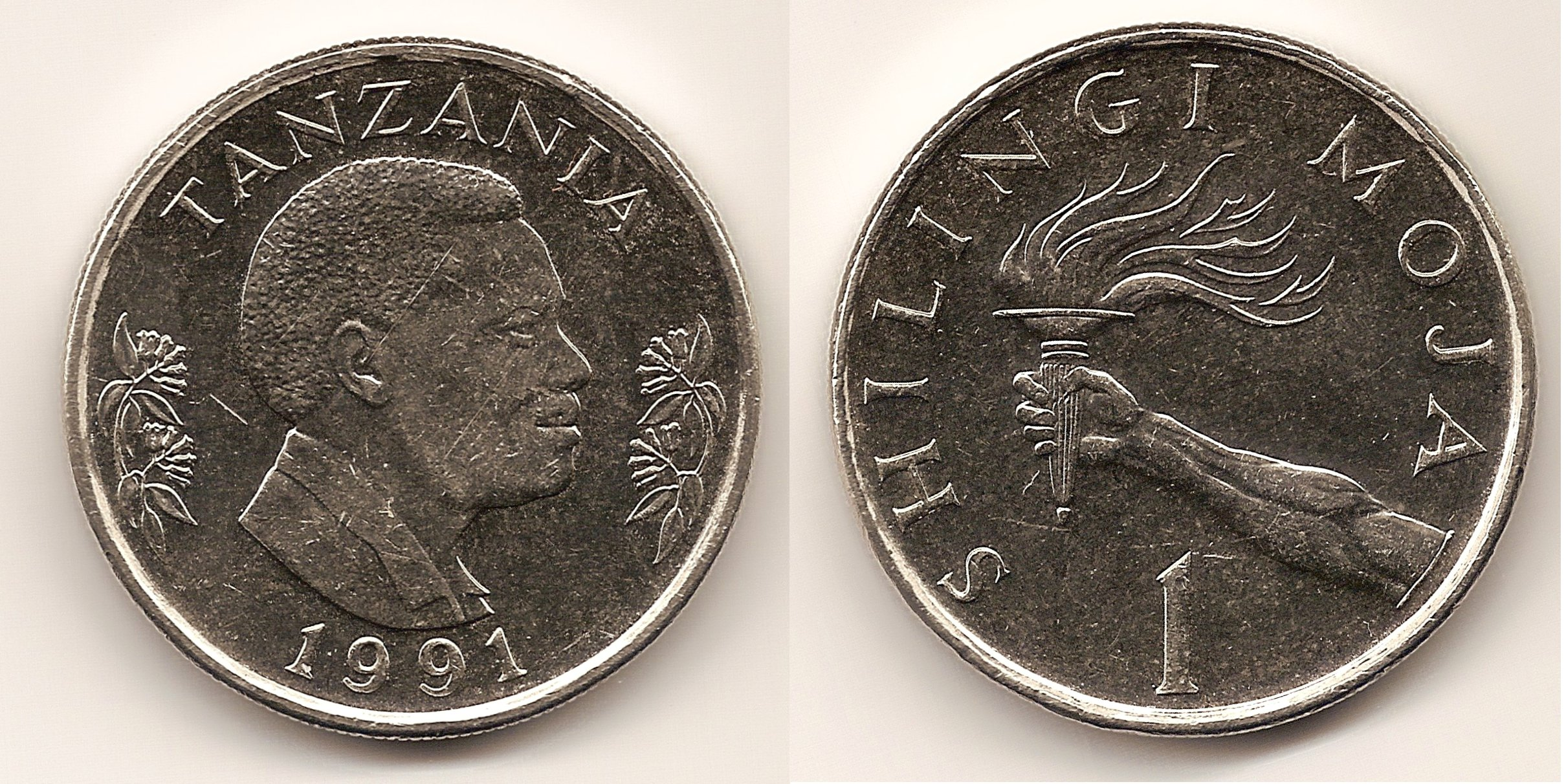
Uhuru Torch on the reverse of a Tanzanian shilling.

The Uhuru Torch (Swahili: Mwenge wa Uhuru, literally "Torch of Freedom") is one of the National Symbols of Tanzania. It is a kerosene torch. It symbolizes freedom and light. It was first lit on top of Mount Kilimanjaro on December 9, 1961 by Alexander Donald Gwebe-Nyirenda. Symbolically to Shine the country and across the borders to bring hope where there is despair, love where there is enmity and respect where there is hatred. The Uhuru Torch race takes place every year starting from different places throughout the country.

== 2024 Uhuru Torch climb ==
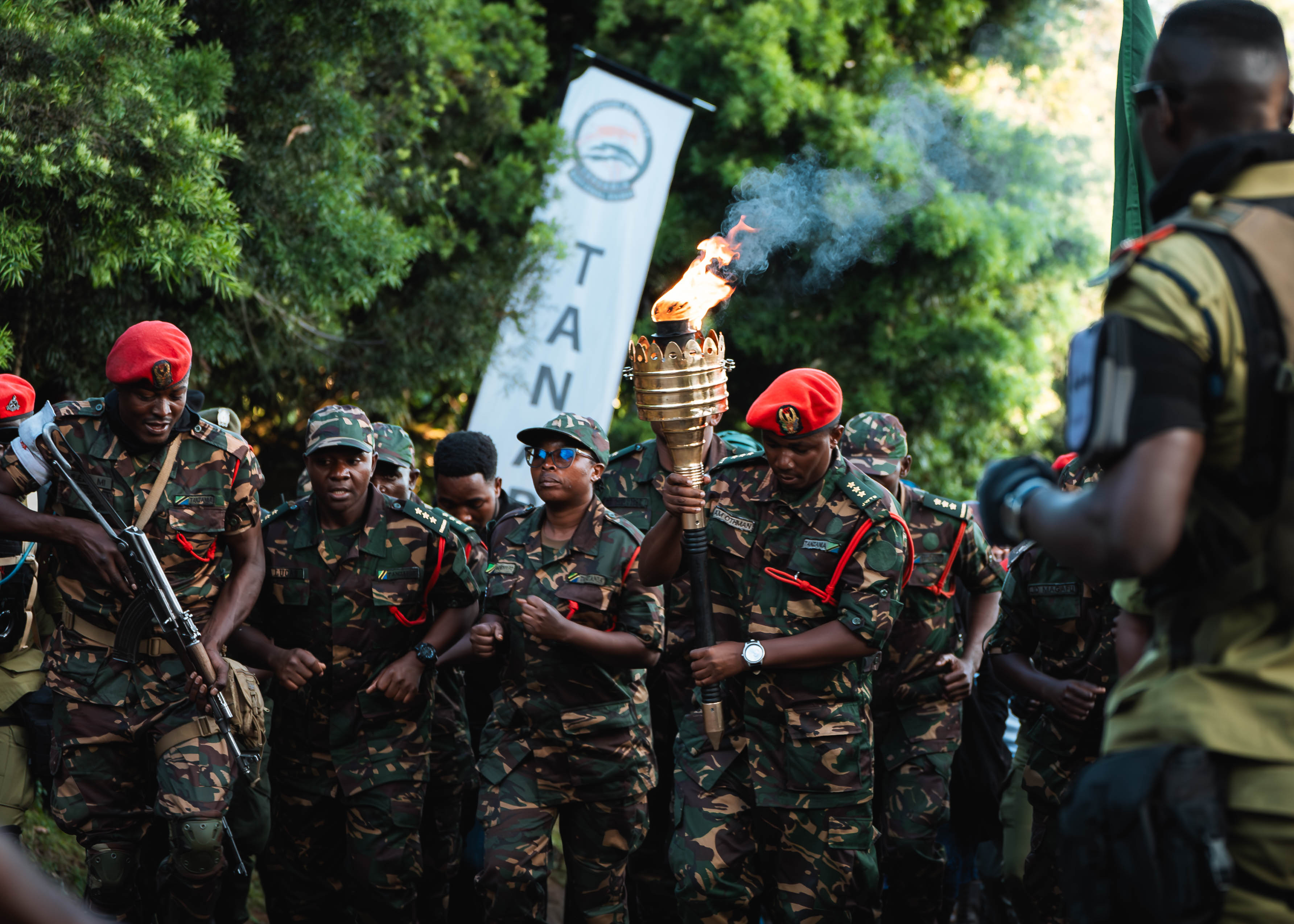
Soldiers of Tanzania People's Defence Force with Uhuru Torch before the climb, October 15, 2024

In 2024, the Uhuru Torch was once again brought to the summit of Mount Kilimanjaro to commemorate 60 years of the union between Tanganyika and Zanzibar and the 25th anniversary of the passing of Tanzania's first president, Julius Nyerere. On 15 October, soldiers from the Tanzania People's Defense Force began carrying the torch up the Marangu route to the peak.

== See also ==
- Uhuru Monument
- Arusha Declaration Monument
- Order of the Uhuru Torch at Orders, decorations, and medals of Tanzania
