= Florens Luoga =

Tanzanian lawyer and academic (born 1958)

7th Governor of the Bank of Tanzania
- In office 8 January 2018 – 7 January 2023
- Appointed by: John Magufuli
- Preceded by: Benno Ndulu
- Succeeded by: Emmanuel Tutuba

Personal details
- Born: 1958 (age 67–68)
- Education: University of Dar es Salaam (LL.B); Queen's University (LL.M); Lund University (MIL); University of Warwick (PhD)

Florens Luoga is a Tanzanian lawyer and academic.

He is the deputy vice chancellor of the University of Dar es Salaam and the chair of the Tanzania Revenue Authority. He was the governor of the Bank of Tanzania, the country's central bank from 2018–2023.
