= Benno Ndulu =

Tanzanian academic (1950–2021)

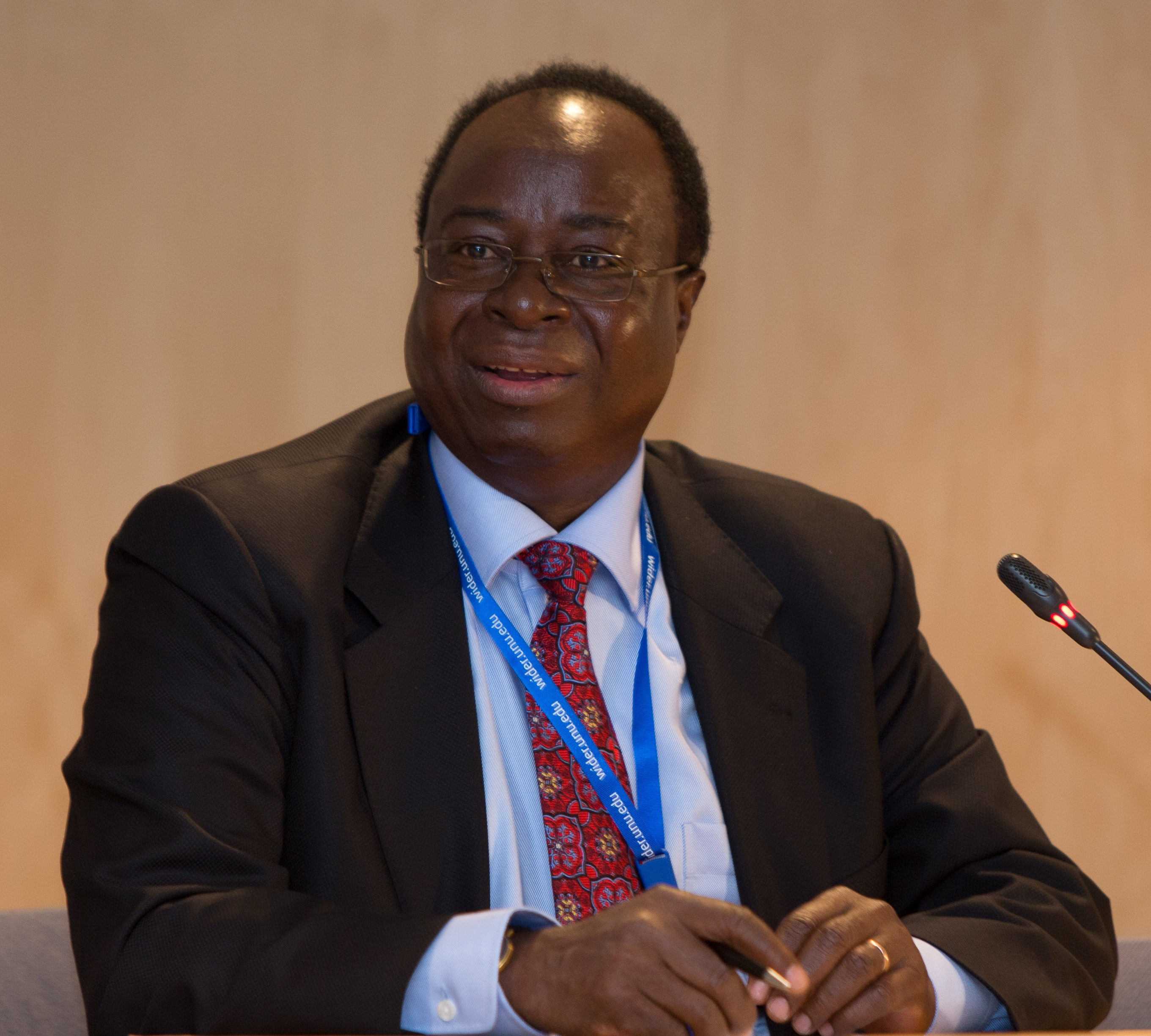

Governor of the Bank of Tanzania
- In office 8 January 2008 – 7 January 2018
- Appointed by: Jakaya Kikwete
- Preceded by: Daudi Ballali
- Succeeded by: Florens Luoga

Personal details
- Born: 23 January 1950
- Died: 22 February 2021 (aged 71)
- Education: Northwestern University (PhD)

Benno Ndulu (23 January 1950 – 22 February 2021) was a Tanzanian Professor and the governor of the Bank of Tanzania, the country's central bank, from 2008 to 2018. He died on 22 February 2021 from COVID-19.

== Career ==
As a professor at the University of Dar es Salaam in the early 1980s, he led a series of seminars on the economic crisis Tanzania was facing. This work made important contributions to the economic reforms that were implemented in the second half of the 1980s by the second phase government. After this, he worked as a Lead Economist with the Macroeconomic Division of the World Bank for Eastern Africa from the Tanzania Country Office. In that assignment he was directly involved with President Benjamin Mkapa's reform program - a program that has contributed to over a decade of sustained economic growth in Tanzania. He is best known for his involvement in setting up and developing one of the most effective research and training networks in Africa, the African Economic Research Consortium.

He served first as its research director and later as its executive director. He received an honorary doctorate from the International Institute of Social Studies (ISS) in The Hague in 1997, recognition of his contributions to Capacity Building and Research on Africa. Following his Ph.D. degree in economics from Northwestern University in Evanston, Illinois, he taught economics and published widely on growth, adjustment, governance and trade.

Ndulu was a visiting professor at the Blavatnik School of Government at the University of Oxford from 2018 until his death in 2021. He first became involved at the University of Oxford in late 2017 with the inception of the Pathways for Prosperity Commission on Technology and Inclusive Development, of which he was academic co-director along with Professor Stefan Dercon. In 2020, the Commission concluded its work and developed into the Digital Pathways at Oxford programme, of which Ndulu was a senior advisor.
