= Tanzania Posts Corporation =

Postal service company

- Trade name: Posta
- Industry: Postal services, courier
- Founded: 1994
- Headquarters: Posta House, Ghana Street, Kivukoni, Ilala MC, Dar es Salaam, Tanzania
- Area served: Tanzania / Worldwide
- Key people: Deos Khamis Mndeme (Postmaster General & CEO)
- Services: Letter post, parcel service, EMS, delivery, Financial services
- Owner: Government of Tanzania
- Website: www.posta.co.tz

Tanzania Posts Corporation is the company responsible for postal service in Tanzania and was established in 1994. It is headquartered in Kivukoni ward of Ilala MC in Dar es Salaam.

== History ==
=== German Postal Services ===
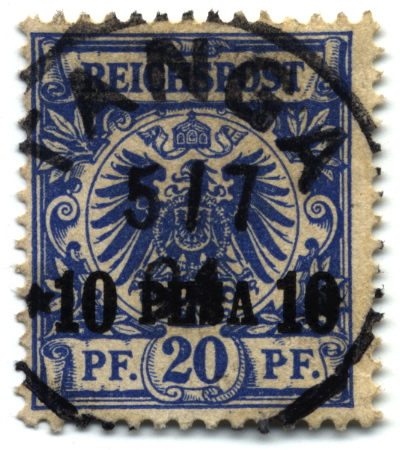
10 pesa on 20 pfennig overprint of 1893, used 5 July 1894 at Tanga

A German postal agency was established on 27 February 1885 in Lamu using German stamps for mail. The Postal Service was operated jointly along with telegraph service administered under the German East African authority. Mail was carried from the colony to Europe using steamers and only post offices along the coast had regular service. At its peak the government operated 54 post offices (1913). The German government also had set up a network of telegraphs and telephones, In 1914 there were 34 telegraph offices operating 2,537 kilometers of land lines.

=== British Takeover and East African Postal Services ===
After the British took over control of Tanganyika, the postal service was handled by them. The British consolidated all the postal and communication entities in Kenya, Uganda and Tanganyika (KUT) under the umbrella of the East African Posts and Telecommunications Administration. Even post-independence in the early 1960s the postal and communications services were managed under the newly formed East African Community. However, after the East African community was dissolved in 1977 the Tanzanian government established the Tanzania Posts and Telecommunications Corporation (TP&TC).

=== Formation of Tanzania Posts Corporation ===
On December 31, 1993, the parliament enacted multiple laws to help deregulate the operations of posts and telecommunications to increase their autonomy and efficiency. Following this three new independent organizations were created.

- The Tanzania Posts Corporation (TPC) fully owned by the government of Tanzania in a form of a public corporation.
- The Tanzania Telecommunications Company Limited (TTCL) as a limited liability public company.
- The Tanzania Broadcasting Center as the government public broadcasting channel for TV and Am Radio.

=== Tanzania Postal Bank ===
The Tanzania Postal Bank was formed before the TPC however, the banking division was part of the Tanzania Posts and Telecommunications Corporation (TP&TC). However, from 1 March 1992, the Tanzania postal bank was established as a successor to the Tanganyika Post office Savings which was established by the Post Office Savings Bank Ordinance of 1925 and became operational in 1927.

== Post Office Distribution ==
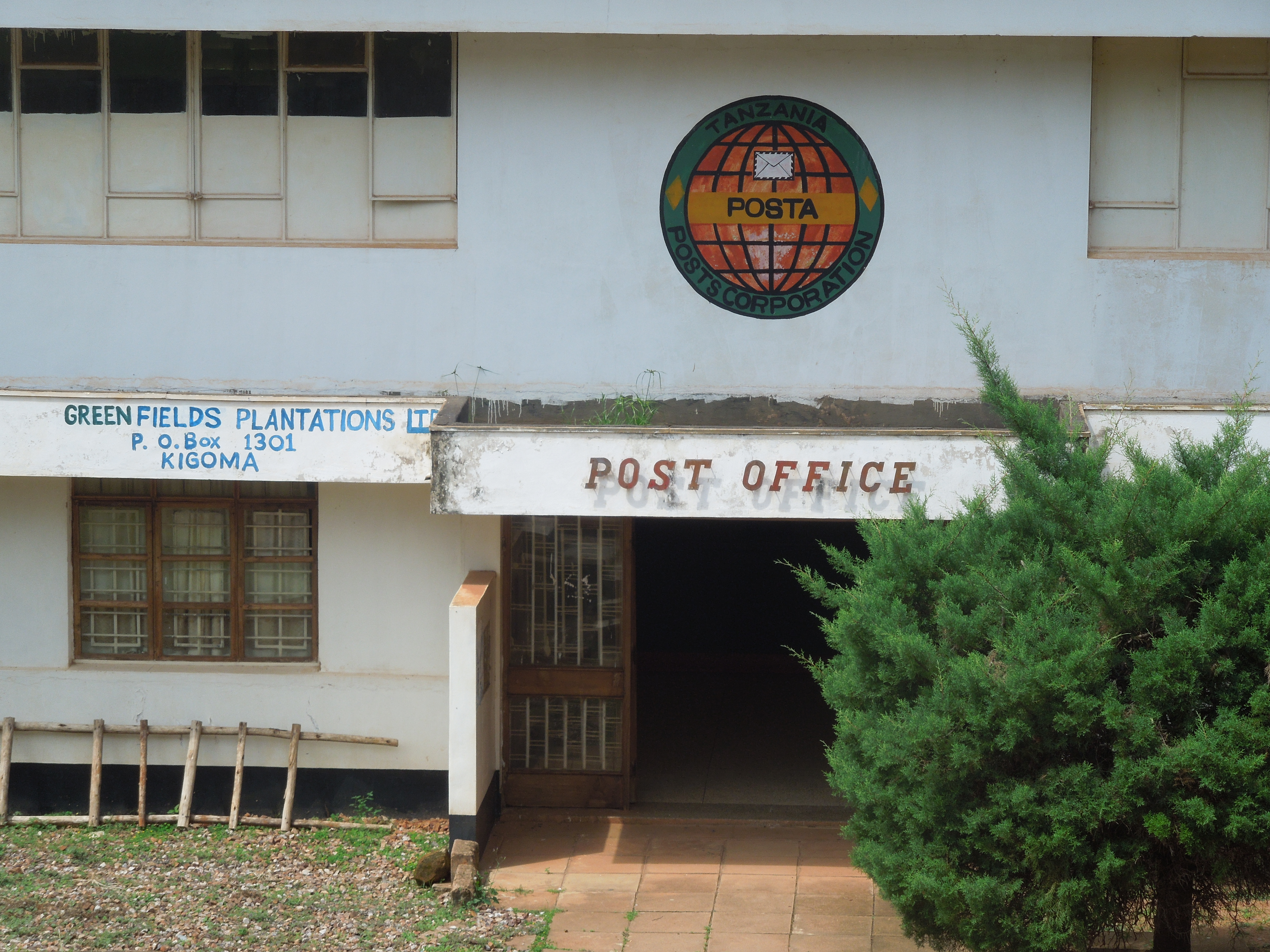
The Kigoma Post Office.

The Posts Corporation is mandated to run as a corporation without receiving funds from the Budget. This means that the corporation had to consolidate a large number of its loss making branches. To help serve the rural population continue to have access to the service the corporation started to franchise post offices. The Posts Corporation operates its mail delivery network using three types of post offices: Departmental Post Offices;Franchised Post offices and SUB post offices.

Region	Postal Code	Departmental	Franchised	SUB	Total	Zone
Arusha Region	23xxx	16	1	1	27	Northern
Dar es Salaam Region	1xxxx	28	6	6	40	Coastal Indian Ocean
Dodoma Region	41xxx	4	12	8	24	Central
Iringa Region	51xxx	5	7	9	21	Southern Highlands
Kagera Region	35xxx	8	4	8	20	Lake
Kigoma Region	47xxx	4	3	8	15	Lake Tanganyika Northern
Kilimanjaro Region	25xxx	12	7	24	43	Northern
Lindi Region	65xxx	3	3	4	10	Coastal Southern Indian Ocean
Mara Region	31xxx	4	1	1	6	Lake
Mbeya Region	53xxx	9	6	6	21	Southern Highlands
Morogoro Region	67xxx	9	10	5	24	Central
Mtwara Region	63xxx	4	2	6	12	Coastal Southern Indian Ocean
Mwanza Region	33xxx	10	8	9	27	Lake Victoria Southern
Ruvuma Region	57xxx	3	2	3	8	Southern Highlands
Shinyanga Region	37xxx	8	2	8	18	Lake
Singida Region	43xxx	4	2	6	12	Central
Tabora Region	45xxx	6	5	15	26	Central
Tanga Region	21xxx	10	4	12	26	Coastal Northern Indian Ocean
Zanzibar Isles	7xxxx	5	4	2	11	Zanzibar
		154	90	155	399	
Source: Tanzania Posts Corporation

== Services ==
=== Financial Services ===
==== Agency Services ====
Due to its wide network the posts corporation is a vital agent for the government to collect funds from the populace especially in rural areas. TPC allows people government bills such as LUKU, DAWASCO, School fees and NECTA examination fees.

==== Bureau de change ====
TPC launched its first Bureau de change at the Dar es Salaam general post office (Posta Mpya) in June 2012. Currently this service is only available at posta mpya and at Shangani Post office-Stone Town in Zanzibar. however the corporation has shown interest in expanding this service to other major regional outlets.
