= Arusha Declaration =

1967 political statement by Tanzanian President Julius Nyerere

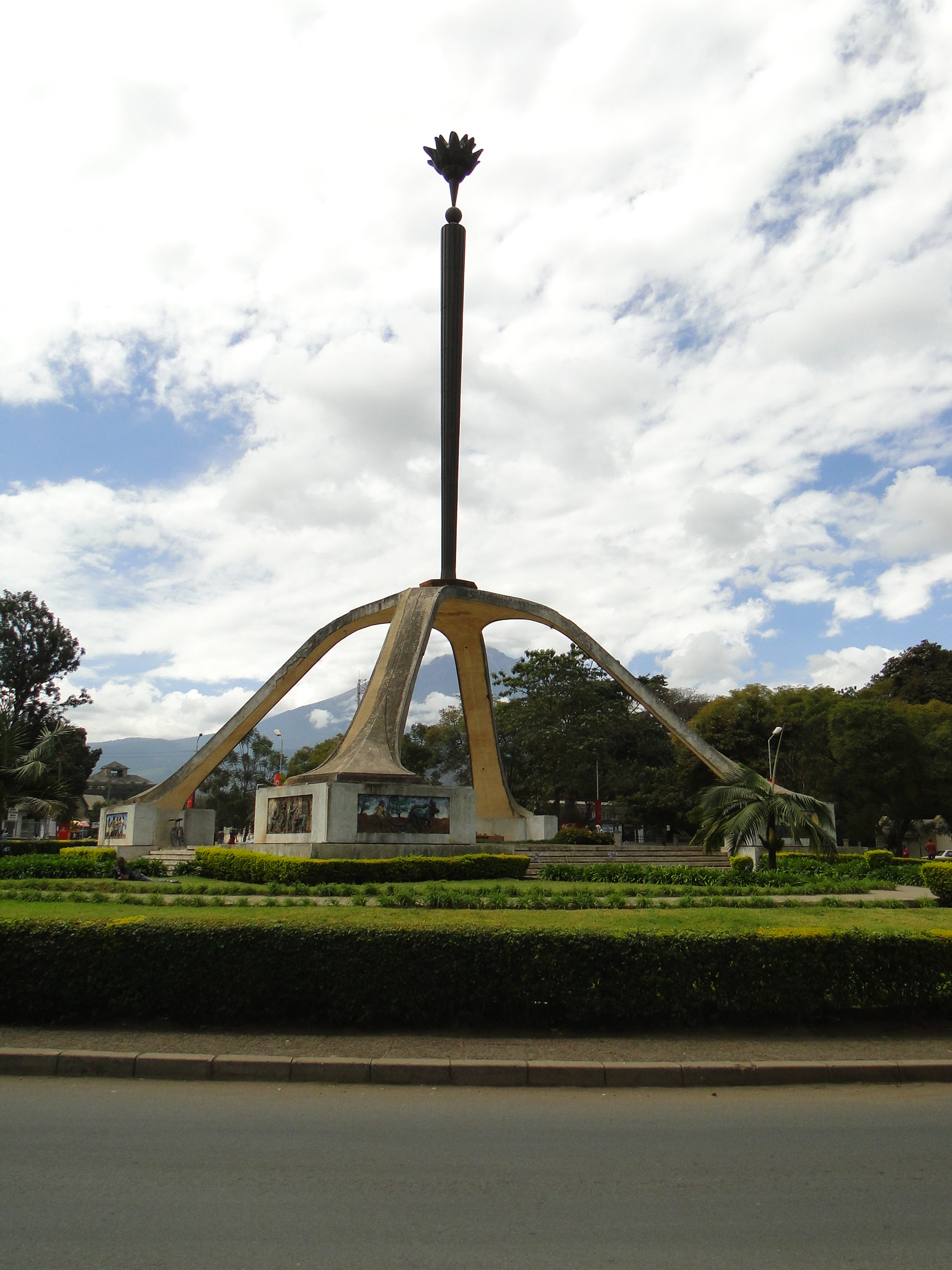
Arusha Declaration Monument

The Arusha Declaration (Swahili: Azimio la Arusha) and TANU’s Policy on Socialism and Self Reliance (1967), referred to as the Arusha Declaration, is known as Tanzania’s most prominent political statement of African Socialism, 'Ujamaa', or brotherhood (Kaitilla, 2007). The Arusha declaration is divided into five parts: The TANU "Creed", The Policy of Socialism, The Policy of Self Reliance, the TANU Membership, and the Arusha Resolution.

== Background ==
In December 1966, Tanzanian President Julius Nyerere toured through half of the country, urging unity to pursue national goals of self-reliance and socialism.

On February 5, 1967, in the town of Arusha, Nyerere issued the Arusha Declaration. It provided the overall ideological framing of Ujamaa and an approach to Tanzania's national development focusing on collective hard work, agrarian transformation, and anti-colonialism.

== Contents ==
=== Creed ===
Part one of the Arusha Declaration, The TANU “Creed”, outlines the principles of socialism and the role of government:

1. That all human beings are equal;
2. That every individual has a right to dignity and respect;
3. That every citizen is an integral part of the Nation and has a right to take an equal part in Government at local, regional and national level;
4. That every citizen has a right to freedom of expression, of movement, of religious belief and of association within the context of the law;
5. That every individual has a right to receive from society protection of his life and of property according to the law;
6. That every citizen has a right to receive a just return for his labour;
7. That all citizens together possess all the natural resources of the country in trust for their descendants
8. That in order to ensure economic justice the State must have effective control over the principal means of production; and
9. That it is the responsibility of the State to intervene actively in the economic life of the Nation so as to ensure the well being of all citizens and so as to prevent the exploitation of one person by another or one group by another, and so as to prevent the accumulation of wealth to an extent which is inconsistent with a classless society (Publicity Section, TANU, Dar es Salaam, 1967, p. 1).

The aims and objects of the Arusha Declaration are:

1. To consolidate and maintain the independence of this country and the freedom of its people;
2. To safeguard the inherent dignity of the individual in accordance with the Universal Declaration of Human Rights;
3. To ensure that this country shall be governed by a democratic socialist government of the people;
4. To cooperate with all the political parties in Africa engaged in the liberation of all Africa
5. To see the government mobilizes the resources of this country towards the elimination of poverty, ignorance and disease;
6. To see that the Government actively assists in the formation and maintenance of cooperative organizations;
7. To see that wherever possible the Government itself directly participates in the economic development of this country
8. To see that the Government gives equal opportunity to all men and women irrespective of race, religion or status;
9. To see that the Government eradicates all types of exploitation, intimidation, discrimination, bribery and corruption;
10. To see that the government exercises effective control over the principal means of production and pursues policies which facilitate the way to collective ownership of the resources of this country;
11. To see that the Government co-operates with other States in Africa in bringing about African Unity;
12. To see that the Government works tirelessly towards world peace and security through the United Nations Organization (Publicity Section, TANU, Dar es Salaam, 1967, p. 2).

=== Socialism ===
Part two of the Arusha Declaration focuses on socialism and some key features of socialism which include a policy of receiving a just return for one’s labour and the necessity for the leadership and control of major resources, services and government, to be in the hands of the working class. In “a true socialist state no person exploits another, but everybody who is able to work…gets a his [or her] income for his [or her] labour” (Publicity Section, TANU, Dar es Salaam, 1967, p. 3). The “major means of production”, which the TANU identify as those resources and services which a large section of the population and industries depend, are “under the control and ownership” of the working class (Publicity Section, TANU, Dar es Salaam, 1967, p. 3). It follows that a democratically elected government of the people is an essential component of socialism (Publicity Section, TANU, Dar es Salaam, 1967). The policy of socialism, the TANU posits, “can only be implemented by people who firmly believe in its principles and are prepared to put them into practice” as well as “live by the principles of socialism in their day to day life” (Publicity Section, TANU, Dar es Salaam, 1967, p. 3-4).

=== Self-reliance ===
Part three of the Arusha Declaration espouses the importance of national self-reliance and debates the nature of development.

Asserting that “A poor man does not use Money as a Weapon”, the Arusha Declaration identifies the heart of economic struggle:

"We have chosen the wrong weapon for our struggle, because we chose money as our weapon. We are trying to overcome our economic weakness by using the weapons of the economically strong – weapons which in fact we do not possess. By our thoughts, words and actions it appears as if we have come to the conclusion that without money we cannot bring about the revolution we are aiming at. It is as if we have said, “Money is the basis of development. Without money, there can be no development" (Publicity Section, TANU, Dar es Salaam, 1967, p. 5).

Secondly, no amount of money, whether it is accrued through taxation, foreign aid or private investment, will ever be enough to achieve the development targets and independence needs of a nation (Publicity Section, TANU, Dar es Salaam, 1967). The essential and true nature of development is this:

“The development of a country is brought about by people, not by money. Money, and the wealth it represents, is the result and not the basis of development.”

In addition to people, the prerequisites of development are land, good policies and good leadership and the necessary condition and root of development are the hard work and intelligence of the people (Publicity Section, TANU, Dar es Salaam, 1967).

=== Membership ===
Part four of the Arusha Declaration, TANU Membership, stresses the importance of leadership’s commitment to the principles and objectives of the TANU and that “above all, the TANU is a party of Peasants and Workers” (Publicity Section, TANU, Dar es Salaam, 1967, p. 19). This good leadership principle bleeds into Part five of the Arusha Declaration which states the role of government in this ideology to take action and steps to “implement the policy of Socialism and Self-reliance” (Publicity Section, TANU, Dar es Salaam, 1967, p. 20).
