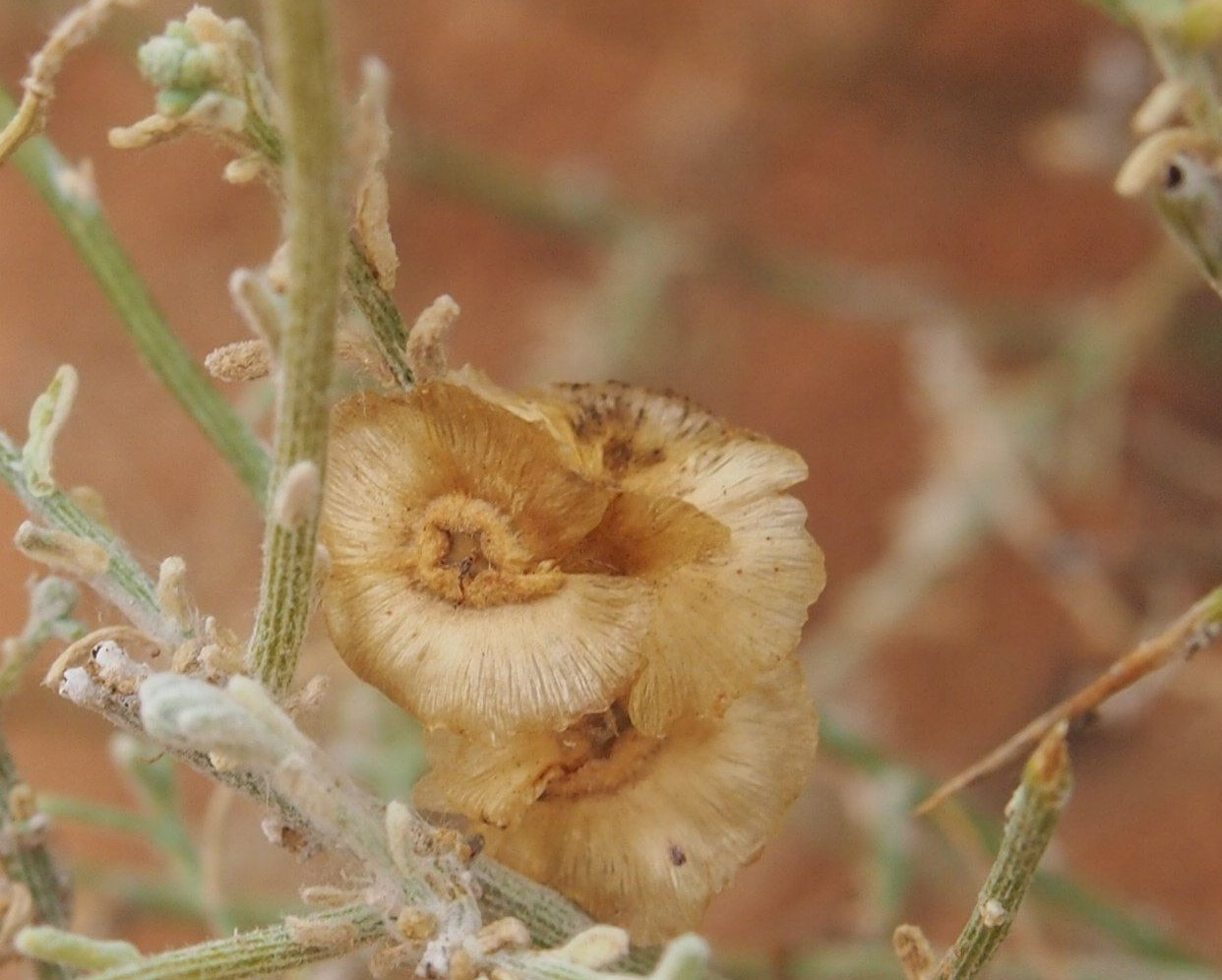
- Fruit of Maireana aphylla

Scientific classification
- Kingdom: Plantae
- Clade: Tracheophytes
- Clade: Angiosperms
- Clade: Eudicots
- Order: Caryophyllales
- Family: Amaranthaceae
- Genus: Maireana
- Species: M. aphylla

Binomial name
- Maireana aphylla (R.Br.) Paul G.Wilson
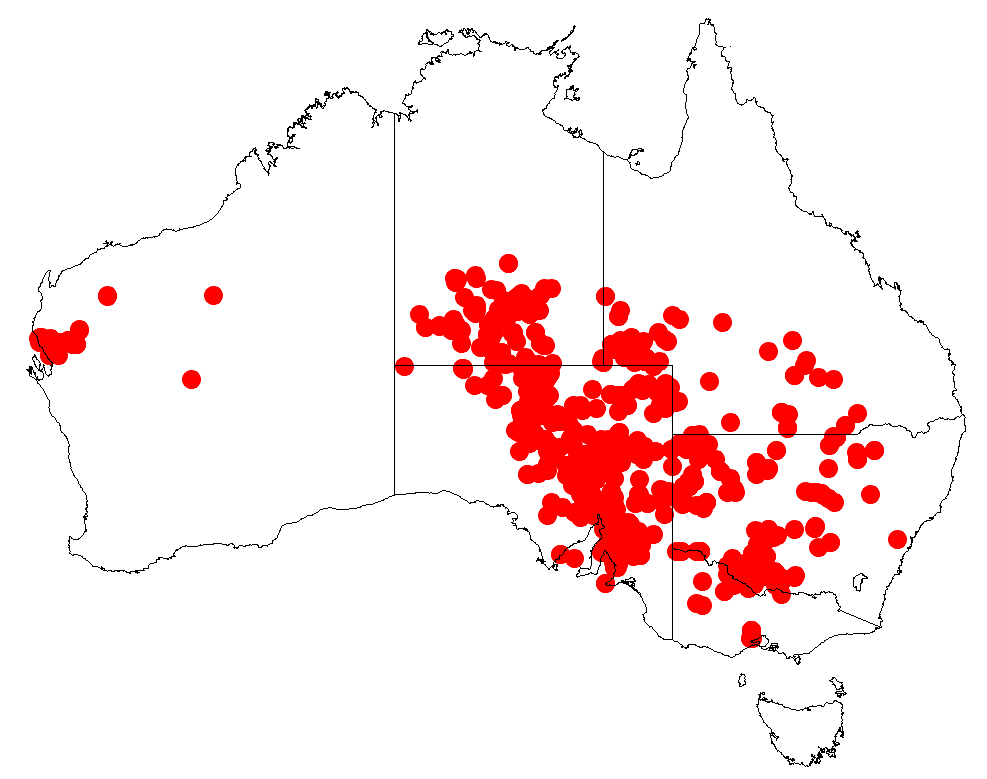
- Occurrence data from AVH

Synonyms
- Kochia aphylla R.Br.; Kochia villosa var. aphylla (R.Br.) C.Moore; Salsola aphylla (R.Br.) Spreng.; Kochia brownii auct. non F.Muell. 1859

= Maireana aphylla =

Cotton bush

Species of plant

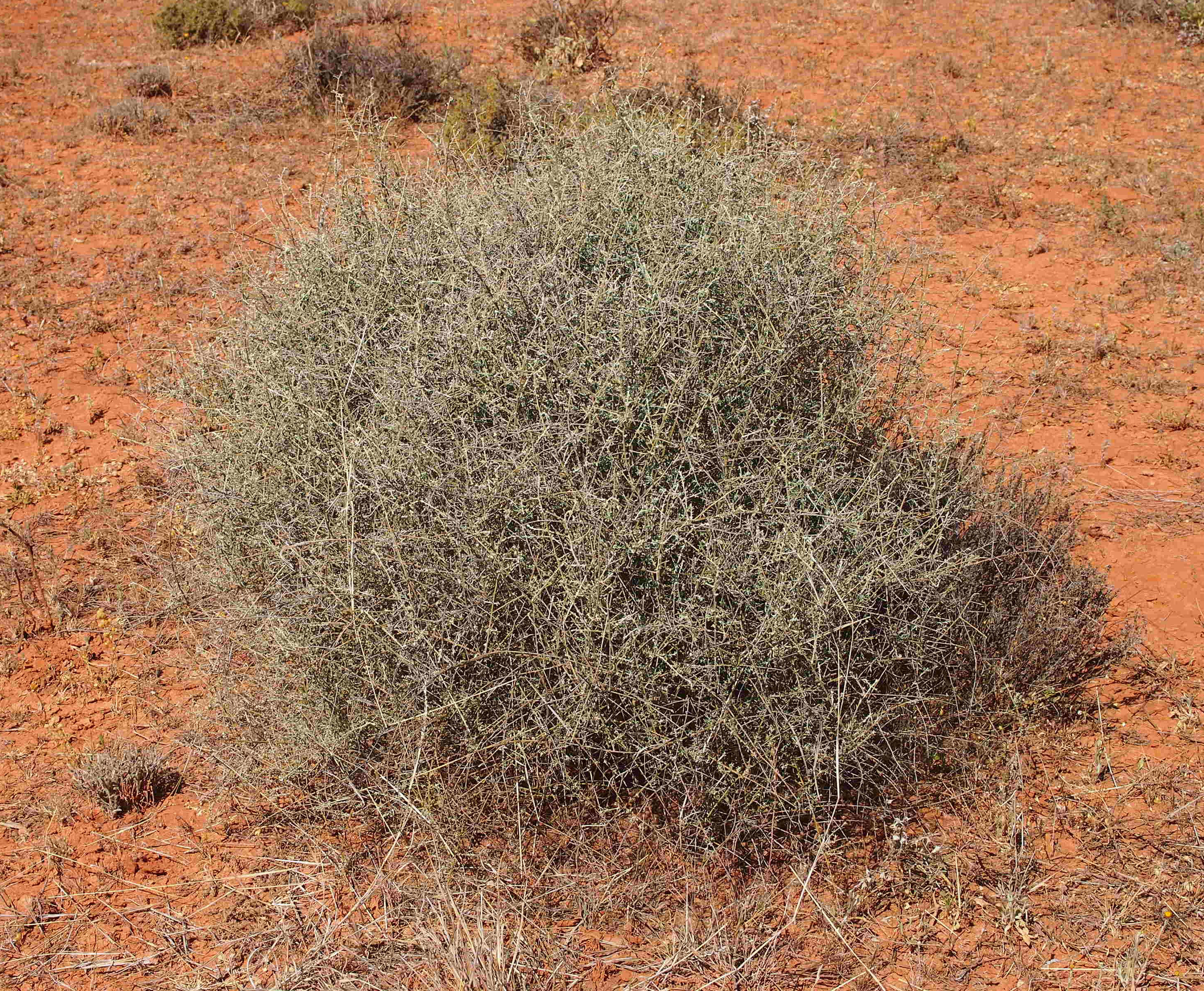
Habit

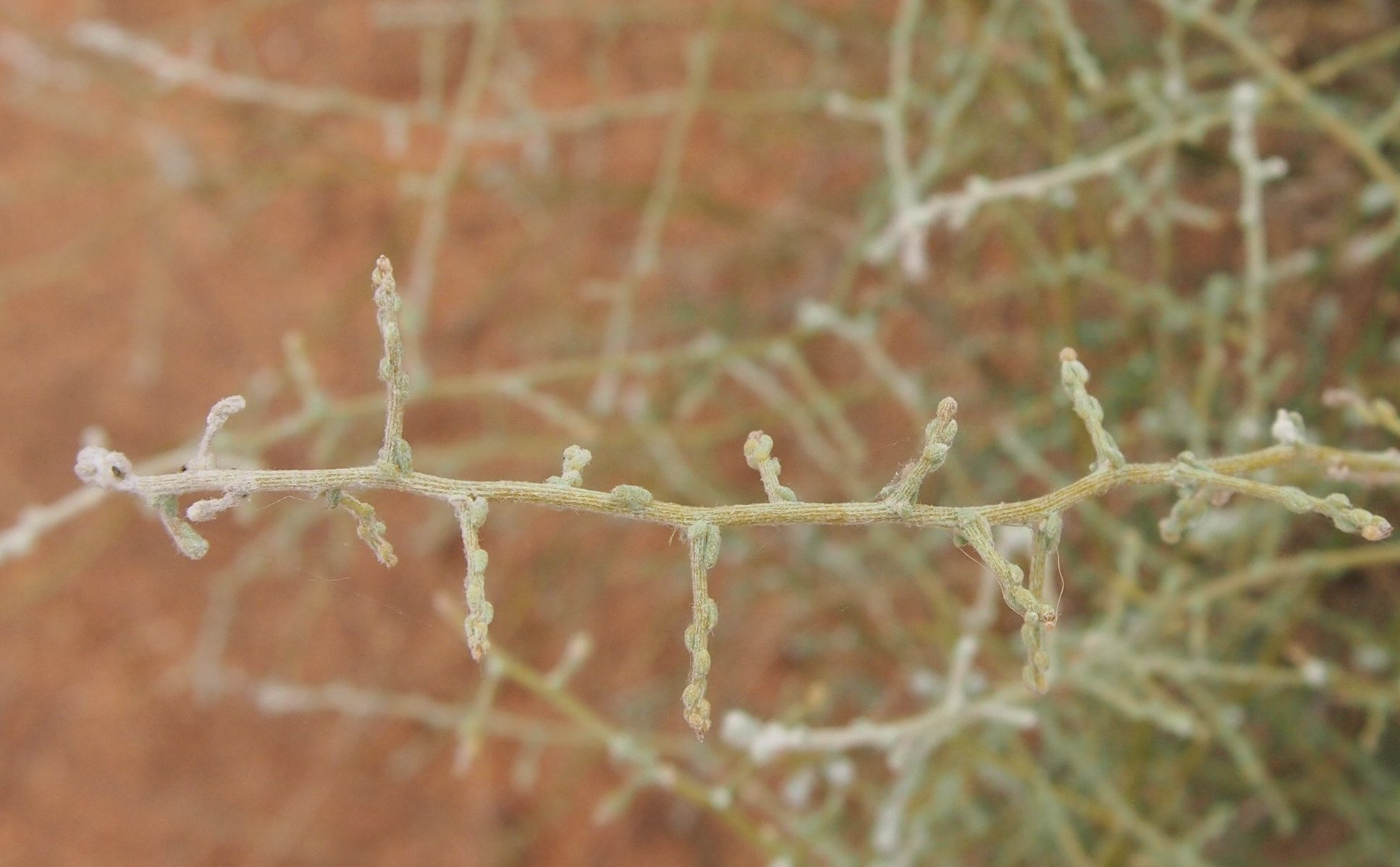
Details of stems

Maireana aphylla, commonly known as cotton bush or leafless bluebush, is a species of flowering plant in the family Amaranthaceae and is endemic to Australia. It is a widely branched, mostly dioecious shrub with small, woolly leaves, flowers arranged singly, and a fruiting perianth with a small tube and horizontal wings.

== Description ==
Maireana aphylla is a widely branched shrub that typically grows to 0.5–2 m (1 ft 8 in – 6 ft 7 in) high and about 1 m (3 ft 3 in) wide. Its branchlets are sometimes covered with woolly hairs and are often spiny. The leaves are arranged alternately, more or less terete, fleshy, 1–8 mm (0.039–0.315 in) long, usually covered with woolly hair, and often fall off as they mature. The flowers are mostly dioecious and arranged singly, sometimes with tiny bracteoles at the base. Male flowers are bell-shaped, about 1.5 mm (0.059 in) high and slightly woolly. Female flowers are more or less spherical, about 1 mm (0.039 in) high with a prominent radiating bulge, a glabrous ovary and two stigmas. The fruiting perianth is straw-coloured, mostly glabrous with a hemispherial to top-shaped tube 1–2 mm (0.039–0.079 in) high with a prominent bulge and a horizontal wing about 8 mm (0.31 in) in diameter. Flowering mostly occurs from December to April, and the fruit is a hemispherical utricle.

== Taxonomy ==
This species was first formally described in 1810 by Robert Brown who gave it the name Kochia aphylla in his Prodromus Florae Novae Hollandiae. In 1975, Paul Graham Wilson transferred the species to Maireana as M. aphylla in the journal Nuytsia. The specific epithet (aphylla) means 'without leaves'.

== Distribution and habitat ==
Cotton bush occurs in all mainland states and territories apart from the Australian Capital Territory. It grows in seasonally inundated clay soils west of the Great Dividing Range in New South Wales, in southern Queensland, the southern half of the Northern Territory and in the Carnarvon-Wiluna area of Western Australia.
