= Arusha Declaration Monument =

Monument in Arusha, Tanzania

- Mnara wa Azimio la Arusha (Swahili)
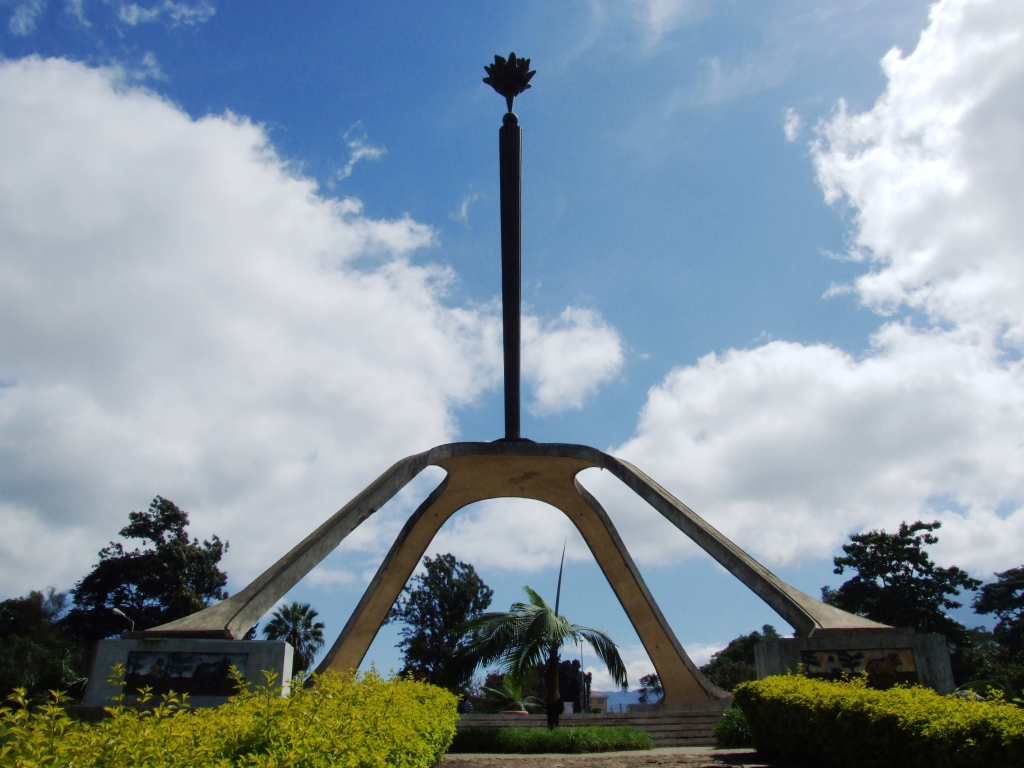
- Interactive map of Arusha Declaration Monument
- Location: Uhuru Roundabout, Swahili Street, Kati Ward, Arusha City, Tanzania
- Coordinates: 3.3696°S 36.6880°E
- Completion date: 1977
- Dedicated to: Arusha Declaration
- Website: sites.google.com/georgetown.edu/arushadeclarationmonument/home

The Arusha Declaration Monument (Swahili: Mnara wa Azimio la Arusha) is a landmark monument located in Kati ward in Arusha, Tanzania. It was unveiled in 1977 by the nation's ruling Chama Cha Mapinduzi (CCM) party to commemorate ten years of the Arusha Declaration. It is situated along Makongoro Road at the centre of the roundabout.

In April 2015, part of the monument was vandalised when one of its copper plaques was stolen.

== Gallery ==
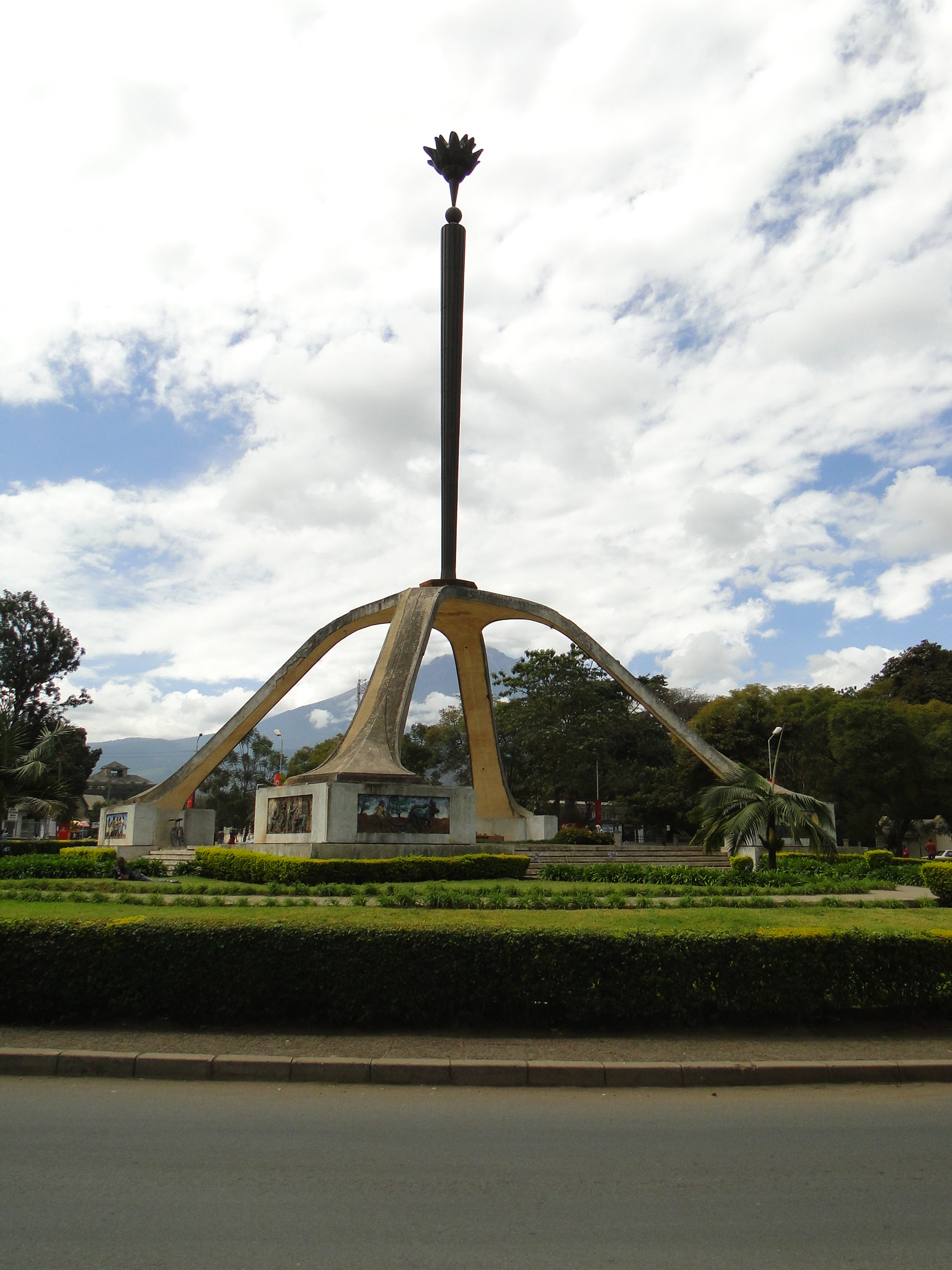

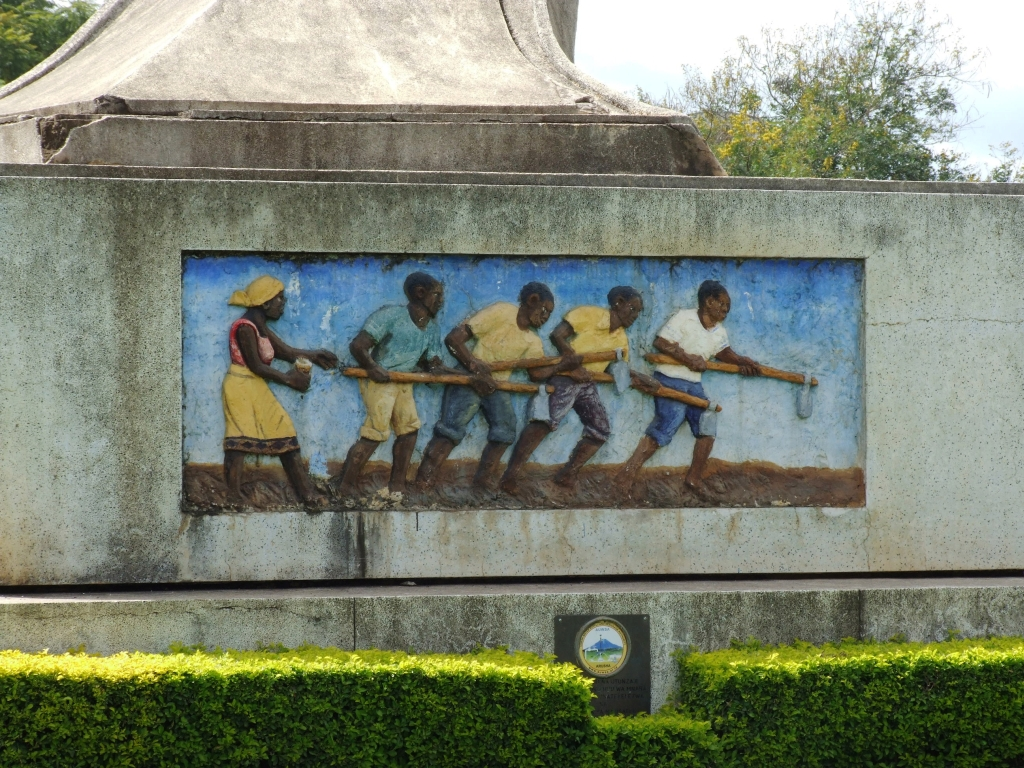
A mural depicting farmers working with hoes

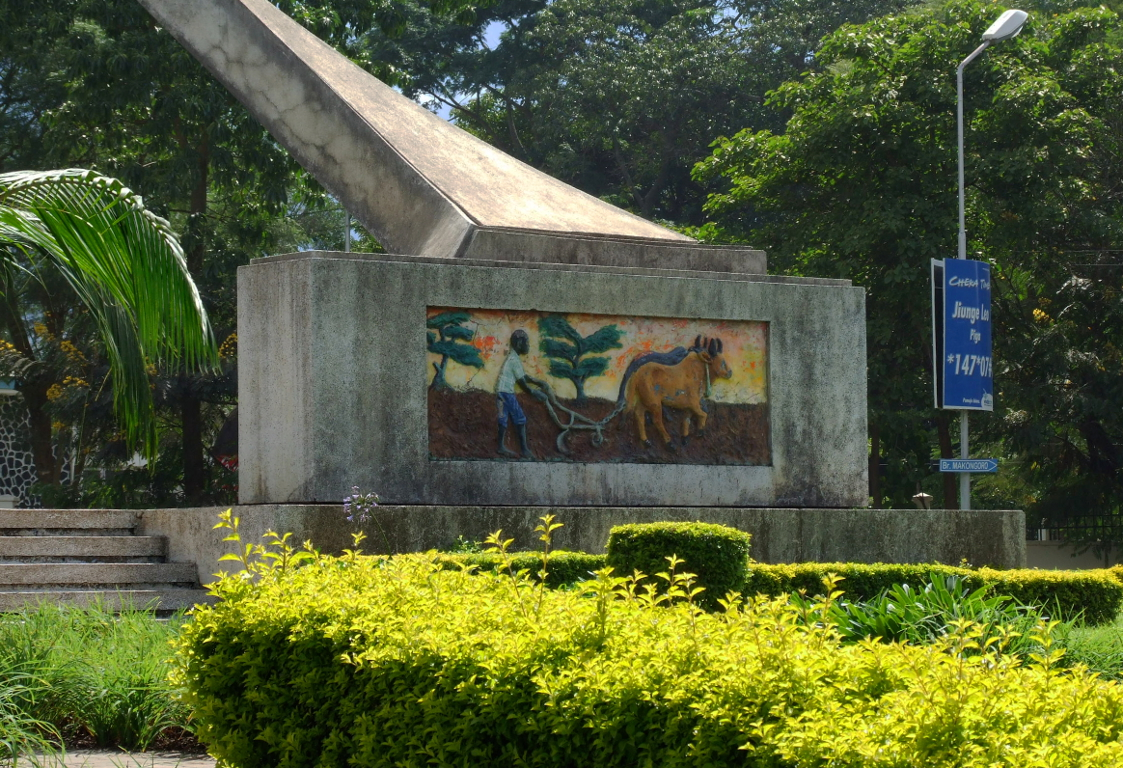
A mural depicting ploughing done with an animal

== See also ==
- Ujamaa
