= List of banks in Tanzania =

This is a list of banks in Tanzania, as updated in late 2024 by the Bank of Tanzania.

== Commercial banks ==
- Absa Bank Tanzania Ltd, part of Absa Group
- Access Bank Tanzania Ltd, part of Access Bank Group
- Akiba Commercial Bank Plc
- Amana Bank Ltd
- Azania Bank Plc, state-owned
- Bank of Africa Tanzania Ltd, part of Bank of Africa Group
- Bank of Baroda Tanzania Ltd, part of Bank of Baroda Group
- Bank of India Tanzania Ltd, part of Bank of India Group
- Canara Bank Tanzania Ltd
- China Dasheng Bank Ltd
- Citibank Tanzania Ltd, part of Citigroup
- CRDB Bank Plc
- DCB Commercial Bank Plc
- Diamond Trust Bank Tanzania Plc, part of Diamond Trust Bank Group
- Ecobank Tanzania Ltd, part of Ecobank Group
- Equity Bank Tanzania Ltd, part of Equity Group
- Exim Bank Tanzania Ltd
- Guaranty Trust Bank Tanzania Ltd, part of GTCO Group
- Habib African Bank Ltd, part of Habib Bank Group
- I&M Bank Tanzania Ltd, part of I&M Bank Group
- International Commercial Bank Tanzania Ltd, part of ICB Banking Group
- KCB Bank Tanzania Ltd, part of KCB Group
- Letshego Faidika Bank Tanzania Ltd, part of Letshego Group
- Mkombozi Commercial Bank Plc
- Mwalimu Commercial Bank Plc
- Mwanga Hakika Bank Ltd
- National Bank of Commerce Ltd
- NCBA Bank Tanzania Ltd, part of NCBA Group
- NMB Bank Plc
- People's Bank of Zanzibar Ltd
- Stanbic Bank Tanzania Ltd, part of Standard Bank Group
- Standard Chartered Bank Tanzania Ltd, part of Standard Chartered Group
- Tanzania Commercial Bank Plc, state-owned
- United Bank for Africa Tanzania Ltd, part of UBA Group

== Development finance institutions ==
- Tanzania Agricultural Development Bank
- TIB Development Bank

== Regional / town / municipal institutions ==
- Cooperative Bank of Tanzania Ltd
- Mucoba Bank Plc
- Uchumi Commercial Bank Ltd

== Microfinance banks ==
- FINCA Microfinance Bank Tanzania Ltd, affiliated with FINCA International
- Selcom Microfinance Bank Tanzania Ltd
- VisionFund Tanzania Microfinance Bank Ltd
- Yetu Microfinance

== Non-bank financial institutions ==
- Maendeleo Bank Plc

== House financing companies ==
- First Housing Company Tanzania Limited

== Regional town councils ==
- Tandahimba Community Bank Ltd

== See also ==
- Economy of Tanzania
- List of banks in Africa
