= Ministry of Finance and Planning (Tanzania) =

Government ministry of Tanzania

- Wizara ya Fedha na Mipango (Swahili)
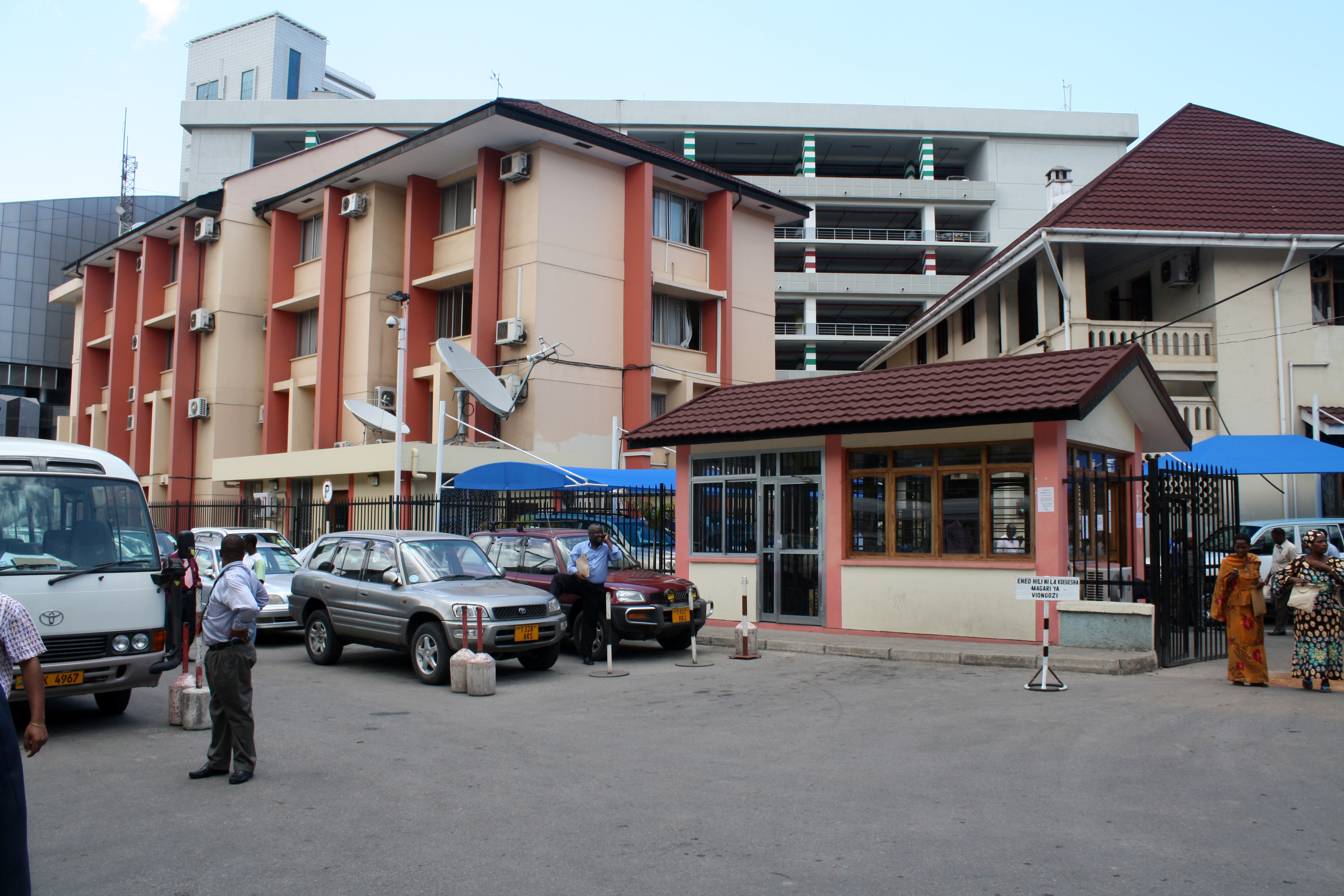

Ministry overview
- Formed: 1964
- Jurisdiction: Government of Tanzania
- Headquarters: Treasury House, Dodoma; 6°48′0″S 39°17′42″E
- Minister responsible: Mwigulu Nchemba
- Deputy Minister responsible: Hon. Hamad Chande
- Ministry executive: Dr. Natu El-Maamry Mwamba, Permanent Secretary
- Website: www.mof.go.tz

The Ministry of Finance is a government ministry of Tanzania. The ministry is located in Dodoma and is headed by Minister Mwigulu Nchemba and Deputy Minister Hon. Hamad Hassan Chande.

== List of ministers ==
Ministry of Finance, United Republic of Tanzania

== See also ==
- Economy of Tanzania
- Government of Tanzania
