= Tanzanian shilling =

Currency of Tanzania

Shilingi za Kitanzania (Swahili)
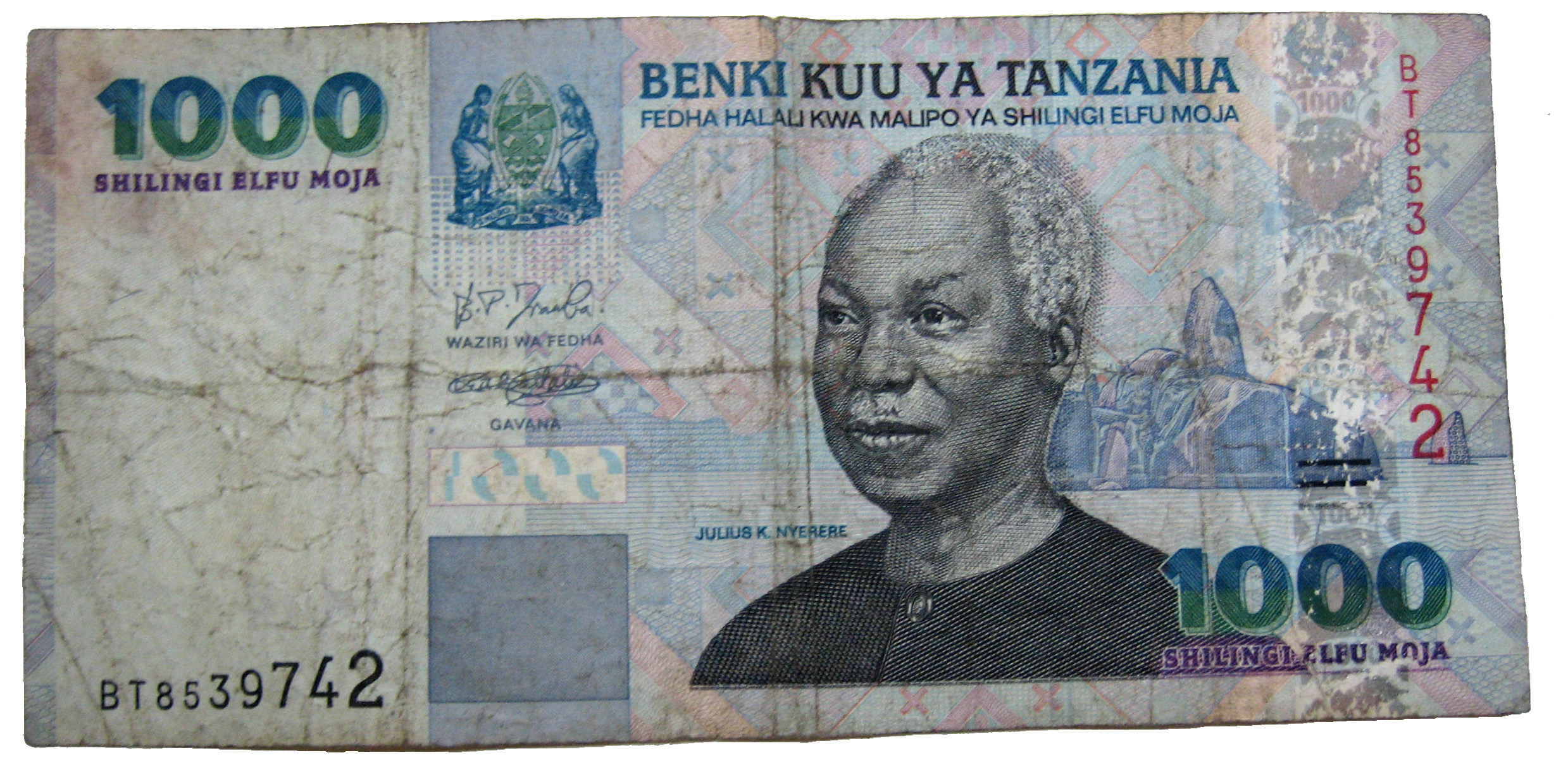
1,000/= note
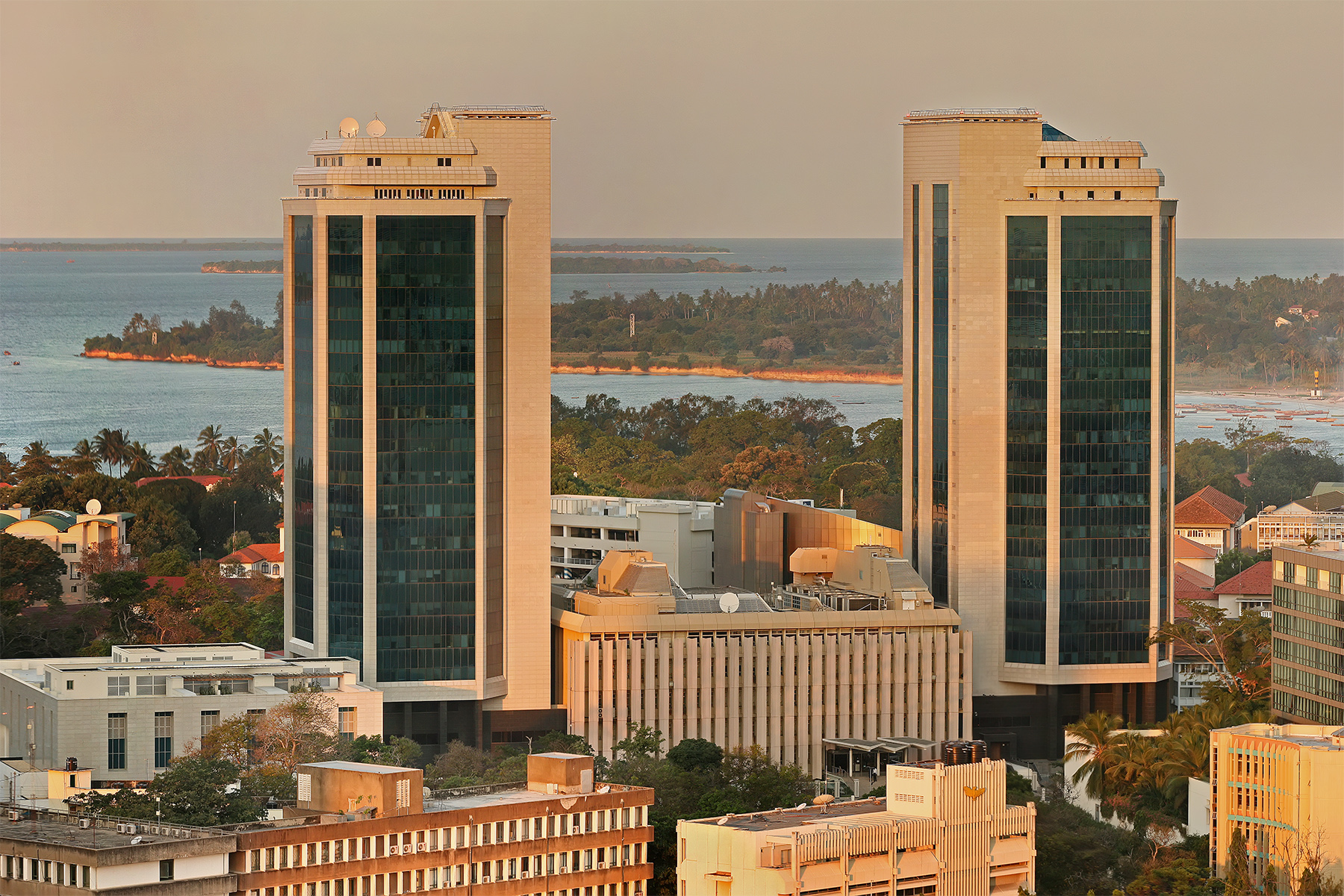
The Bank of Tanzania headquarters in Dar es Salaam

ISO 4217
- Code: TZS (numeric: 834)
- Subunit: 0.01

Unit
- Unit: shilling
- Plural: shillings

Denominations
- Subunit
- 1/100: cent
- Banknotes: 500/=, 1,000/=, 2,000/=, 5,000/=, 10,000/=
- Coins: 50/=, 100/=, 200/=, 500/=

Demographics
- User(s): Tanzania

Issuance
- Central bank: Bank of Tanzania
- Website: Bank of Tanzania website

Valuation
- Inflation: 5.6%
- Source: The World Factbook, 2015 est.

The shilling (Swahili: shilingi; abbreviation: TSh; code: TZS) is the currency of Tanzania. It is subdivided into 100 cents (senti in Swahili). The Tanzanian shilling replaced the East African shilling on 14 June 1966 at par.

== Notation ==
Prices in the Tanzanian shilling are written in the form of x/y, where x is the amount above 1 shilling, while y is the amount in cents. An equals sign or hyphen represents zero amount. For example, 50 cents is written as "-/50" and 100 shillings as "100/=" or "100/-". Sometimes the abbreviation TSh is prefixed for distinction. If the amount is written using words as well as numerals, only the prefix is used (e.g. TSh 10 million).

This pattern was modelled on sterling's pre-decimal notation, in which amounts were written in some combination of pounds (£), shillings (s), and pence (d, for denarius). In that notation, amounts under a pound were notated only in shillings and pence.

== Coins ==
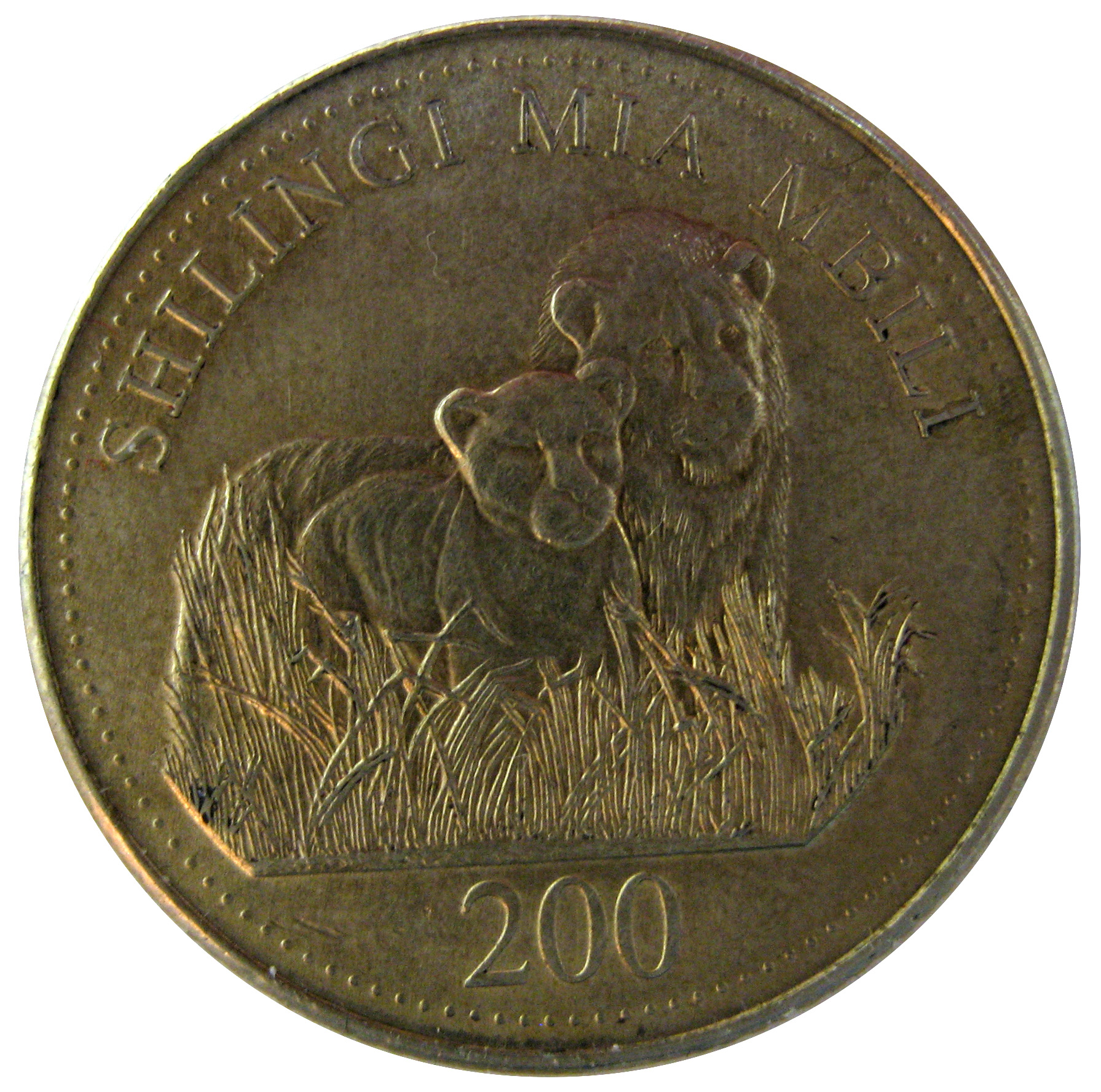
200/= obverse

In 1966, coins were introduced in denominations of -/5, -/10, -/20 and -/50 and 1/=, with the -/5 struck in bronze, the -/10 in nickel-brass (copper-nickel-zinc) and the -/50 and 1/= in cupro-nickel. Cupro-nickel 5/= coins were introduced in 1972, followed by scalloped, nickel-brass -/10 in 1977. This First Series coins set, in circulation from 1966 up to 1984, was designed by Christopher Ironside OBE.

In 1987, nickel-plated steel replaced cupro-nickel in the -/50 and 1/=, and cupro-nickel 5/= and 10/= coins were introduced, with the 5/= decagonal in shape. In 1990, nickel-clad-steel 5/=, 10/= and 20/= were introduced, followed by brass-plated steel coins for 100/= in 1993, 50/= in 1996 and copper-nickel-zinc 200/= in 1998.

Coins currently in circulation are the 50/=, 100/=, 200/=, and 500/=. The 500/= coin was issued on 8 September 2014.

Tanzanian shilling coins
Image	Value	Composition	Diameter	Weight	Thickness	Edge	Issued
	-/5	bronze	23.24 mm (dodecagonal)	4.0 g	1.33 mm	Smooth	1966-1984
	-/10	nickel-brass	25 mm (scalloped)	5.03 g	1.49 mm	Smooth	1977-1984
	-/20	nickel-brass	24 mm	5 g		Smooth	1966-1984
	-/50	copper-nickel	21 mm	4 g	1.6 mm	Reeded	1966-1984
	-/50	nickel-plated steel	21 mm	4 g	1.8 mm	Reeded	1988-1990
	1/=	copper-nickel	27.7 mm	8 g	1.62 mm	Reeded	1966-1984
	1/=	nickel-plated steel	23.5 mm	6.5 g		Reeded	1987-1992
	5/=	copper-nickel	31.5 mm (decagonal)	13.8 g	2.2 mm	Segmented; five smooth and reeded parts	1972-1980
	5/=	copper-nickel	27.5 mm (decagonal)	8.3 g	2 mm	Segmented; five smooth and reeded parts	1987-1989
	5/=	nickel-plated steel	27.5 mm (decagonal)	8.52 g	2 mm	Reeded	1990-1993
	10/=	copper-nickel	29 mm	9.7 g	2 mm	Reeded	1987-1989
	10/=	nickel-plated steel	29 mm	10 g	2.25 mm	Reeded	1990-1993
	20/=	nickel-plated steel	32 mm (heptagonal)	13 g	2 mm	Smooth	1990-1992
	50/=	brass-plated steel	22 mm (heptagonal)	7.91 g	2.9 mm	Smooth	1996, 2012, 2015
	100/=	brass-plated steel	24.5 mm	9 g	2.7 mm	Reeded	1993, 1994, 2012, 2015
	200/=	copper-nickel-zinc	26.8 mm	8 g	2 mm	Segmented; five smooth and reeded parts	1998, 2008, 2014
	500/=	nickel-plated steel	27.5 mm	9.5 g	2.4 mm	Reeded	2014, 2019

== Banknotes ==
On 14 June 1966, the Benki Kuu Ya Tanzania (Bank of Tanzania) introduced notes for 5/=, 10/=, 20/= and 100/=. The 5/= note was replaced by a coin in 1972. 50/= notes were introduced in 1985, followed by 200/= in 1986, 500/= in 1989 and 1,000/= in 1990. The 10/=, 20/=, 50/= and 100/= notes were replaced by coins in 1987, 1990, 1996 and 1994, respectively. 5,000/= and 10,000/= notes were introduced in 1995, followed by 2,000/= in 2003. A new series of notes came out in 2011. These new notes include many security features that prevent counterfeiting.

Banknotes in circulation today are 500/=, 1,000/=, 2,000/=, 5,000/= and 10,000/=

Older Series
Image		Value	Dimensions	Main Colour	Description			Date of issue
Obverse	Reverse	Value	Dimensions	Main Colour	Obverse	Reverse	Watermark	Date of issue
		10/=	-	Green	Julius Nyerere	Arusha Declaration Monument	Giraffe	-
		20/=	-	Blue-violet	Julius Nyerere	General Tyre East Africa Plant	Giraffe	-
		100/=	-	Red	Julius Nyerere	Maasai	Giraffe	-

1997 Series
Image	Value	Dimensions	Main Color	Description		Date of issue	Watermark
Image	Value	Dimensions	Main Color	Obverse	Reverse	Date of issue	Watermark
	500 /= (Shilingi Mia Tano)	138 x 69 mm	Green	Tanzanian coat of arms; Giraffe; Zebra	Clove harvest; Uhuru Torch	1997	Giraffe
	1000 /= (Shillingi Elfu Moja)	142 x 71 mm	Red	Tanzanian coat of arms; Giraffe; African Elephant	Kiwira coal mine; Door of People's Bank of Zanzibar	1997	Giraffe
	1000 /= (Shillingi Elfu Moja)	142 x 71 mm	Red	Tanzanian coat of arms; Julius Nyerere; African Elephant	Kiwira coal mine; Door of People's Bank of Zanzibar	2000	Giraffe
	5000 /= (Shillingi Elfu Tano)	145 x 73 mm	Purple	Tanzanian coat of arms; Giraffe; Rhino	Giraffes; Mount Kilimanjaro	1997	Giraffe
	10,000 /= (Shilingi Elfu Kumi)	149 x 75 mm	Indigo	Tanzanian coat of arms; Giraffe; Lion	Bank of Tanzania; "House of Wonder" (Zanzibar)	1997	Giraffe
These images are to scale at 0.7 pixel per millimetre (18 pixel per inch). For table standards, see the banknote specification table.

2003 Series
Image		Value	Dimensions	Main Colour	Description			Date of issue
Obverse	Reverse	Value	Dimensions	Main Colour	Obverse	Reverse	Watermark	Date of issue
		500/=	130 × 63 mm	Green	African Buffalo	Nkrumah Hall, University of Dar es Salaam	Giraffe	2003
		1,000/=	135 × 66 mm	Blue	Julius Nyerere	Statehouse, Dar es Salaam	Giraffe	2003
		2,000/=	140 × 69 mm	Orange-brown	Lion, Mount Kilimanjaro	Old Fort, Stone Town, Zanzibar	Giraffe	2003
		5,000/=	145 × 72 mm	Purple	Black Rhinoceros	Geita Gold Mine and House of Wonders Zanzibar	Giraffe	2003
		10,000/=	150 × 75 mm	Red	Elephant	Bank of Tanzania headquarters in Dar es Salaam	Giraffe	2003
These images are to scale at 0.7 pixel per millimetre (18 pixel per inch). For table standards, see the banknote specification table.

=== Currently in circulation ===
2011 Series
Image		Values	Dimensions	Main Colour	Description		Date of issue	Date of first issue	Watermark
Obverse	Reverse	Values	Dimensions	Main Colour	Obverse	Reverse	Date of issue	Date of first issue	Watermark
		500/=	120 x 60 mm	Green	Tanzanian coat of arms; Sheikh Abeid Amani Karume	University of Dar es Salaam central hall building; graduating students wearing caps and gowns; Aesculap's rod	2011	1 January 2010	Julius Kambarage Nyerere with electrotype 500
		1,000/=	125 x 65 mm	Blue	Tanzanian coat of arms; President Julius Kambarage Nyerere; Bismarck Rock in Mwanza Harbor	Coffee plant; State House (Ikulu) building with flag in Dar es Salaam	2011	1 January 2010	Julius Kambarage Nyerere with electrotype 1000
		2,000/=	130 x 66 mm	Orange	Tanzanian coat of arms; Lion	Palm trees; old Omani Arab Fort (Ngome Kongwe) in Zanzibar's Stone Town; carved block	2011	1 January 2010	Julius Kambarage Nyerere with electrotype 2000
		5,000/=	135 x 67 mm	Purple	Tanzanian coat of arms; plant; black rhinoceros	Cyanid Leaching plant of the gold mines of Geita	2011	1 January 2010	Julius Kambarage Nyerere with electrotype 5000
		10,000/=	140 x 68 mm	Red	Tanzanian coat of arms; Elephant	Flowers; Bank of Tanzania headquarters building in Dar es Salaam	2011	1 January 2010	Julius Kambarage Nyerere with electrotype 10000
These images are to scale at 0.7 pixel per millimetre (18 pixel per inch). For table standards, see the banknote specification table.

Current TZS exchange rates
From Google Finance:	AUD CAD CHF CNY EUR GBP HKD JPY USD KES
From Yahoo! Finance:	AUD CAD CHF CNY EUR GBP HKD JPY USD KES
From XE.com:	AUD CAD CHF CNY EUR GBP HKD JPY USD KES
From OANDA:	AUD CAD CHF CNY EUR GBP HKD JPY USD KES

== See also ==
- Economy of Tanzania
- Ugandan shilling
- Kenyan shilling

Preceded by: East African shilling Reason: currency independence Ratio: at par Note: independent shilling introduced in 1966, but EA shilling not demonetised until 1969	Currency of Tanzania; 1966 –	Succeeded by: Current
