= Bank of Tanzania =

Monetary authority of Tanzania

Bank of Tanzania Benki Kuu ya Tanzania (Swahili language)

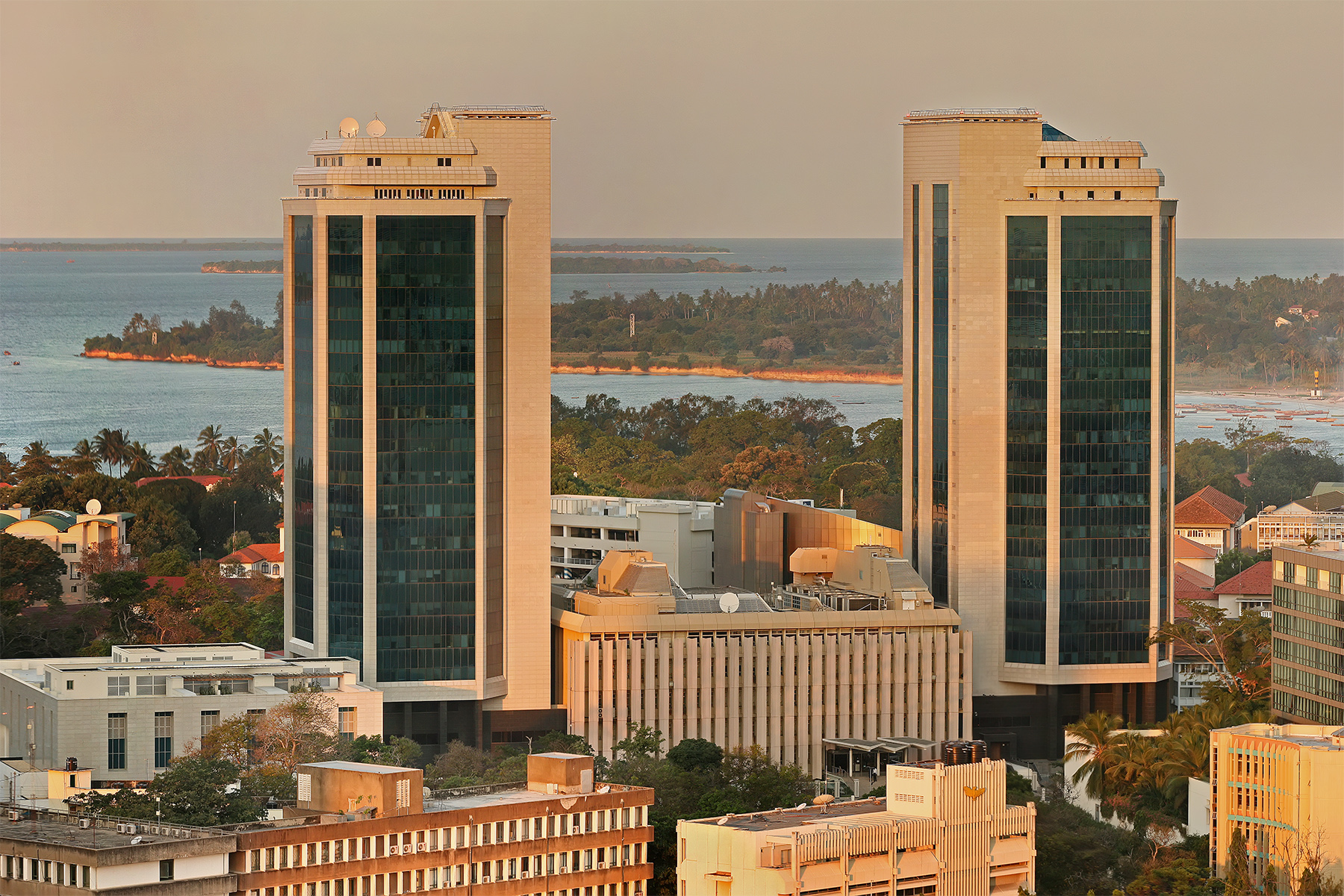
- Central bank of: Tanzania
- Headquarters: Chamwino; P.O Box 2303; 40184 Dodoma, Tanzania
- Coordinates: 6°48′57″S 39°17′39″E
- Established: 14 June 1966 (began operations)
- Ownership: 100% state ownership
- Governor: Emmanuel Mpawe Tutuba
- Currency: Tanzanian shilling (TSh); TZS (ISO 4217)
- Reserves: US$3 930 million
- Preceded by: East African Currency Board
- Website: Central bank website

The Bank of Tanzania (Swahili: Benki Kuu ya Tanzania) is the central bank of the United Republic of Tanzania. It is responsible for issuing the national currency, the Tanzanian shilling.

The bank was established under the Bank of Tanzania Act 1965. However, in 1995, the government decided that the central bank had too many responsibilities, thus hindering its other objectives. As a result, the government introduced the Bank of Tanzania Act 1995, which gave the bank the single objective of monetary policy.

It is governed by a board of directors consisting of ten people, four of whom are ex officio members which have three advisory committees that can assist them. The bank is headed by its Governor, assisted by three deputy governors in Administration, Economic and financial policies and Financial stability.

== History ==
The Bank of Tanzania was chartered by the first parliament of Tanzania through the Bank of Tanzania Act of 1965 following the dissolution of the East African Currency Board in 1965. The bank commenced operations on June 14, 1966, and was inaugurated by the first president of Tanzania, Mwalimu Julius Kambarage Nyerere.

=== Arusha declaration ===
Immediately after its formation, the Arusha declaration was proclaimed, and the traditional roles of the bank was modified to accommodate for the changes in the economic system. The lack of competition in the financial markets meant the bank had to reorient its role in the economy. After 1971 The Exchange Control Ordinance and Import Control Ordinance allowed the bank to apply the following plans:

- The Annual Finance and Credit plan allowed the bank to freely control interest rates and was the main act that allowed the bank to administer monetary policy
- The Foreign Exchange Plan to control the use of foreign exchange to protect national interests and protect the local currency from devaluation

With increased villagization during the period and the continued weakness in the balance of payment of the bank, the Bank of Tanzania act was amended in 1978 to give the bank more control. The Act shifted the responsibility of financial planning from the ministry of finance and planning directly to the bank.

=== Liberalization ===
Following the liberalization of the economy in 1995 and the rapid rate of inflation and devaluation in the shilling, the Bank of Tanzania act of 1995 was passed which clarified the primary objective of the central bank to establish a monetary environment to ensure Price stability. The act was further clarified in 2006 and is the current governing act for the bank.

== Organizational structure ==
=== Board of directors ===
The Bank of Tanzania has a board of directors consisting of 10 people. Four members are directly appointed by the President of Tanzania. The Ministry of Finance and the Principal Secretary to the Treasury of the Revolutionary Government of Zanzibar also appoint a member each to the board.

The current board composition consists of the following:

- Governor, who is the chairman of the board
- Three deputy governors, whose roles are determined by the Governor
- Representative from the ministry of finance and planning
- Four non-executive directors
- Secretary to the board

== List of governors of the Bank of Tanzania ==
Below is a list of the eight Bank of Tanzania governors with seven former governors and one acting governor:

1. Edwin Mtei – 1966 to 1974
2. Charles Nyirabu – 1974 to 1989
3. Gilman Rutihinda – 1989 to 1993
4. Idris Rashidi – 1993 to 1998
5. Daudi Ballali – 1998 to 8 January 2008
6. Benno Ndulu – 8 January 2008 to 7 January 2018
7. Florens Luoga – 8 January 2018 to 7 January 2023
8. Emmanuel Tutuba – 7 January 2023 to present

== Branch network ==
The bank of Tanzania branch Network with head office situated in Dar es Salaam.

The Bank is headquartered in Dar es Salaam in the heart of the financial district of the city and also maintains the following 6 branches in the following cities:

1. Arusha
2. Mbeya
3. Mwanza
4. Zanzibar
5. Dodoma
6. Mtwara

The last branch was opened in Mtwara due to the recent economic growth in the southern regions.

== Financial inclusion ==
The Bank is active in promoting financial inclusion policy and is a leading member of the Alliance for Financial Inclusion. It is also one of the original 17 regulatory institutions to make specific national commitments to financial inclusion under the Maya Declaration during the 2011 Global Policy Forum held in Mexico.

In 2016, the Bank's Governor Professor Benno Ndulu renewed the Bank's commitment by launching the National Financial Inclusion Framework (NFIF),2016-2020. The objective is to reduce the number of vulnerable households due to low unstable incomes, low confidence and self-exclusion from the current 28.2 per cent.

== Training and continuous professional development ==
The Bank also has its own training institute located in Mwanza.

== Criticism ==
The Bank of Tanzania was involved in an incident which resulted in an audit of its External Arrears Account. About TSh 133 billion were discovered to have been lost in 2005 through dubious payments. As a result, the President of Tanzania fired the bank's Governor, D. T. S. Ballali, on 9 January 2008. Professor Benno Ndulu was appointed to take this position on the same day.

== See also ==
- Tanzanian shilling
- Economy of Tanzania
- List of banks in Tanzania
- List of central banks of Africa
- List of central banks
