= Umqombothi =

Beer made from maize, corn, and sorghum

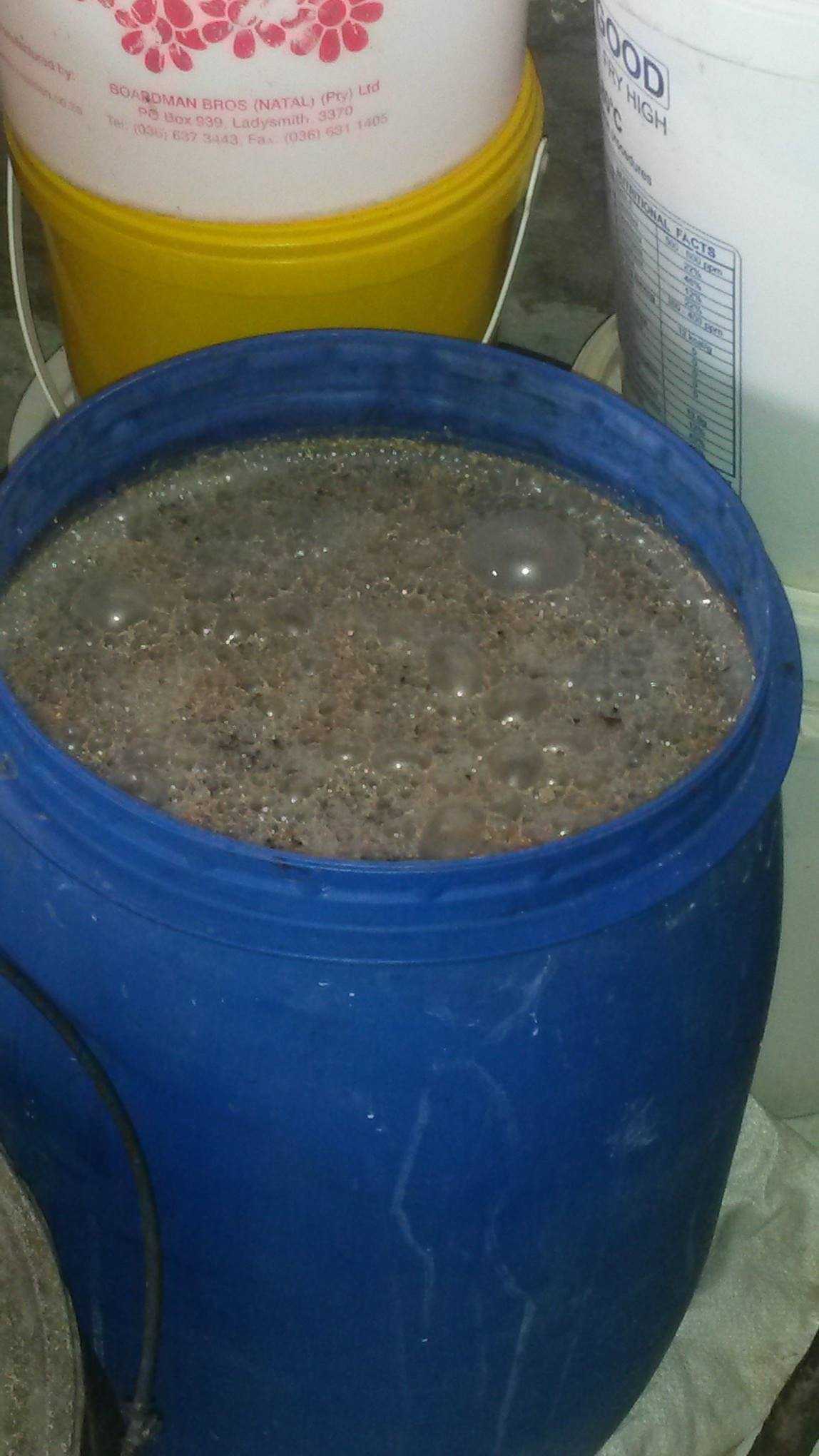
- Type: Beer
- Flavour: maize (corn), maize malt, sorghum malt, yeast

Umqombothi (Xhosa pronunciation: [um̩k͡ǃomboːtʰi]), is a South African traditional type of beer made from maize (corn), maize malt, sorghum malt, yeast, and water. The beer has a rather low content of alcohol (usually less than 3%) but a high content of B vitamins. It has a thick, creamy, and gritty consistency (from the maize), a heavy and distinctly sour aroma, and an opaque, buff-colored appearance.

Umqombothi is cheaper than commercial lager beers brewed from barley and flavoured with hop flowers.

== Traditional method of preparation ==
Umqombothi is brewed following traditional customs, and these vary slightly between regions. The recipe is often passed down through generations. The beer is traditionally prepared over a fire outside of the house. It then passively cools to ambient temperatures outside the house.

The ingredients used are: equal measures of maize meal, crushed mealie malt (corn malt), and crushed sorghum malt. The maize malt provides a lighter-toned beer with a mellower flavour. The sorghum malt provides a darker beer.

The ingredients are mixed in a cast-iron pot, known as a potjie in South Africa. Four measures of warm water are added. The mixture is left overnight. The mixture starts fermenting, and bubbles appear. A sour odour can be detected.

A small portion of the wort is removed and put to one side. The remaining mash is cooked until a crusty sediment forms. This product is known as isidudu and can be eaten as a porridge. When beer is made, the isidudu is left to cool for a day.

After the mixture has cooled, it is poured into a large plastic vat. The wort that was set aside is added to the vat. A handful of sorghum malt and a handful of maize malt is added to the vat. The brew is stirred with a traditional spoon called an iphini. The vat is covered with a lid and blanket (to retain heat). The vat is put in a warm place overnight to encourage fermentation.

To see if the brew is ready, the traditional testing method is to light a match close to the vat. If the match blows out quickly, the brew is ready. If the match remains lit, the brew is not ready. This is because the fermenting mash produces large amounts of carbon dioxide, which does not allow for the combustion of the match.

When the brew is ready, the fermented mash is filtered through a large metal strainer to remove the spent grains. The sediment at the bottom of the vat is known as intshela. The intshela is added to the strained beer to give extra flavour.

The spent grains are squeezed out and are usually cast onto the ground for chickens. The brewer of the beer traditionally thanks the ancestors while casting the corn.

Once the beer has been strained, it is poured into a large communal drum known as a gogogo. It is ready for sharing with friends and family. When guests arrive at the brewer's home to taste the beer and join in the celebration, they traditionally bring a bottle of brandy as a symbol of gratitude.

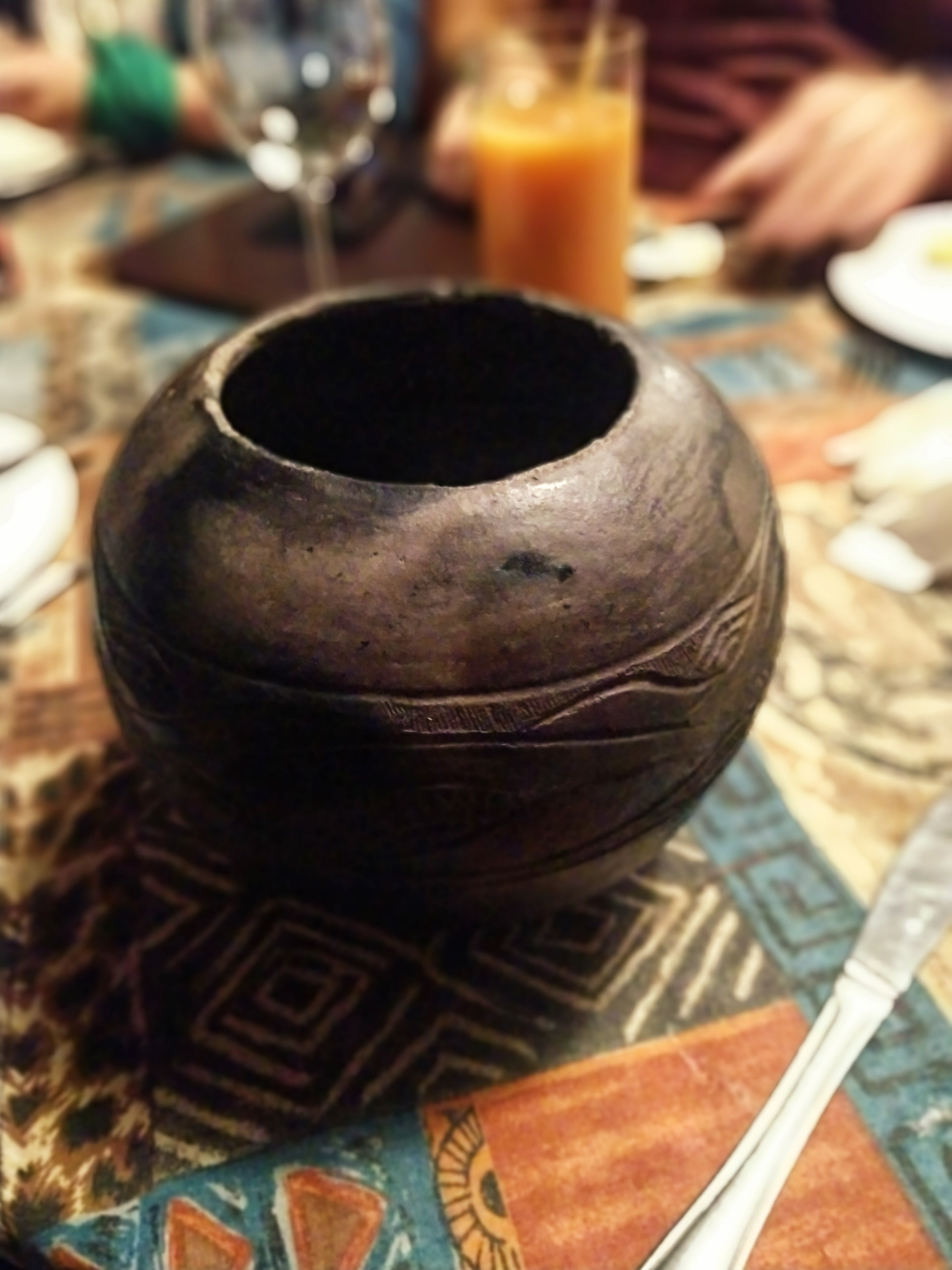
Umqombothi served in an ukhamba, Zulu beer vessel at Cape Town, South Africa.

== Traditional uses ==
Umqombothi is used to celebrate the homecoming of young men, known as abakwetha in Xhosa culture, after ulwaluko - initiation and religious male circumcision.

This beer plays a significant role when someone contacts their ancestors, the izinyanya, and plays a central role in the social context, and so is often used during customary weddings, funerals, and imbizos (traditional meetings).

== Health concerns ==
A study found sorghum and maize used as ingredients in umqombothi often are contaminated by mycotoxin-producing molds Aspergillus spp., Penicillium spp., Rhizopus spp. and Mucor spp.

Although the finished beer is not contaminated with the fungi, 33% of commercially brewed sorghum beer contained aflatoxins and 45% of home-brewed beers contained zearalenone or ochratoxin A (or both) in the final product.

The Eastern Cape province of South Africa has a very high incidence of esophageal cancer. Research by the South African Medical Research Council suggests mycotoxins in homegrown maize are linked to the high incidence of this cancer.

== In popular culture ==
It is referred to in the song of the same name sung by Yvonne Chaka Chaka. The lyrics of the song call it a "magic African beer." The song is heard in the opening of Hotel Rwanda.

== See also ==
- Burukutu in West Africa, Chad, and Ethiopia.
- Chibuku and Munkoyo or 'Ibwatu' in Zambia.
