= Tanzania Breweries Limited =

Tanzanian brewery firm

- Type: Public
- Traded as: DSE: TBL
- Industry: Brewing, Beverage
- Founded: 1933
- Headquarters: Buguruni, Dar es Salaam, Tanzania
- Key people: Cleopa Msuya; Chairman of the Board; Michelle Kilpin; Managing Director
- Products: Beer, Wines and Spirits
- Revenue: ▲TSh 892 billion (March 2013)
- Net income: ▲TSh 176 billion (March 2013)
- Total assets: ▲TSh 738 billion (March 2013)
- Total equity: ▲TSh 487 billion (March 2013)
- Number of employees: 1,742
- Parent: AB InBev
- Website: Homepage

Tanzania Breweries Limited, also referred to as TBL, is the oldest and largest brewing company in Tanzania.

== Overview ==
Tanzania Breweries Limited is a Tanzania based company principally engaged in the production, distribution and sale of malt beer, non-alcoholic malt beverages and alcoholic fruit beverages in Tanzania.

TBL's headquarters are located in Dar es Salaam, Tanzania it operates four breweries in Dar es Salaam, Arusha, Mwanza and Mbeya. TBL is listed on the Dar es Salaam Stock Exchange and it's a component company of the Tanzania All Share Index

== History ==
=== 1930 - 1959 ===
Tanzania Breweries Limited was founded in 1933 as Tanganyika Breweries in Tanganyika (now part of Tanzania). Tanganyika Breweries was acquired by Nairobi based Kenya Breweries Limited (KBL) in 1935. In 1936, KBL and Tanganyika Breweries operations were merged leading to the creation of the East African Breweries Limited (EABL).

=== 1960 - 1989 ===
In 1964, The company name was changed from Tanganyika Breweries Limited to Tanzania Breweries Limited following the political unification of Tanganyika and the People's Republic of Zanzibar and Pemba to form the United Republic of Tanzania.

In 1967 the Government of Tanzania made their first equity investment in TBL through their acquisition of 45% stake in the brewery. They later took full control of the company in 1979 as part of the government's nationalization of large industries as part of the Arusha Declaration. After being nationalized in 1967, TBL was poorly managed and become a loss making entity.

=== 1990 - 1999 ===
In 1993 the Tanzanian government entered into a joint venture with South African Breweries International (Now SABMiller) to run TBL. This was through a US$22.5 million investment in TBL by SABI, giving them SABI 50% ownership of the company. SABMiller is the second largest and one of the most efficient brewing companies in the world. SABMiller turned TBL around with extraordinary speed, almost tripling production in the space of three years.

September 9, 1998, TBL was listed on the DSE through a successful IPO. This made it the second listing on the bourse since its formation.

=== 2000 - 2009 ===
In 2002, Diageo backed EABL acquired a 20% equity stake in TBL after it (EABL) signed license agreements with South African Breweries International and agreed to issue SABI a similar share Kenya Breweries Limited. In the agreement, SABI exited the Kenyan market while EABL exited the Tanzanian market by handing over its Kibo subsidiary to TBL. This partnership gave TBL 98% share of the market as by the year 2004.

=== 2010 to 2014 ===
In 2010, EABL ended this agreement with TBL with the option to buy a 51% stake in Serengeti Breweries, the second-biggest beer maker in Tanzania, and disposed its 20% stake in TBL for US$71.5 million through a secondary offer on the DSE in 2011.

On March 14, 2013, the TBL acquired 60% of the share capital of Dar es Salaam based Darbrew Limited for TSh 8,816 million and obtained control of the company.

As at March 31, 2013, TBL had a 74% market share of alcoholic beverages in Tanzania and was a major exporter of beer to Nile Breweries Limited of Uganda, Crown Beverage Limited of Kenya and Zambia Breweries Limited of Zambia all subsidiaries of SABMiller.

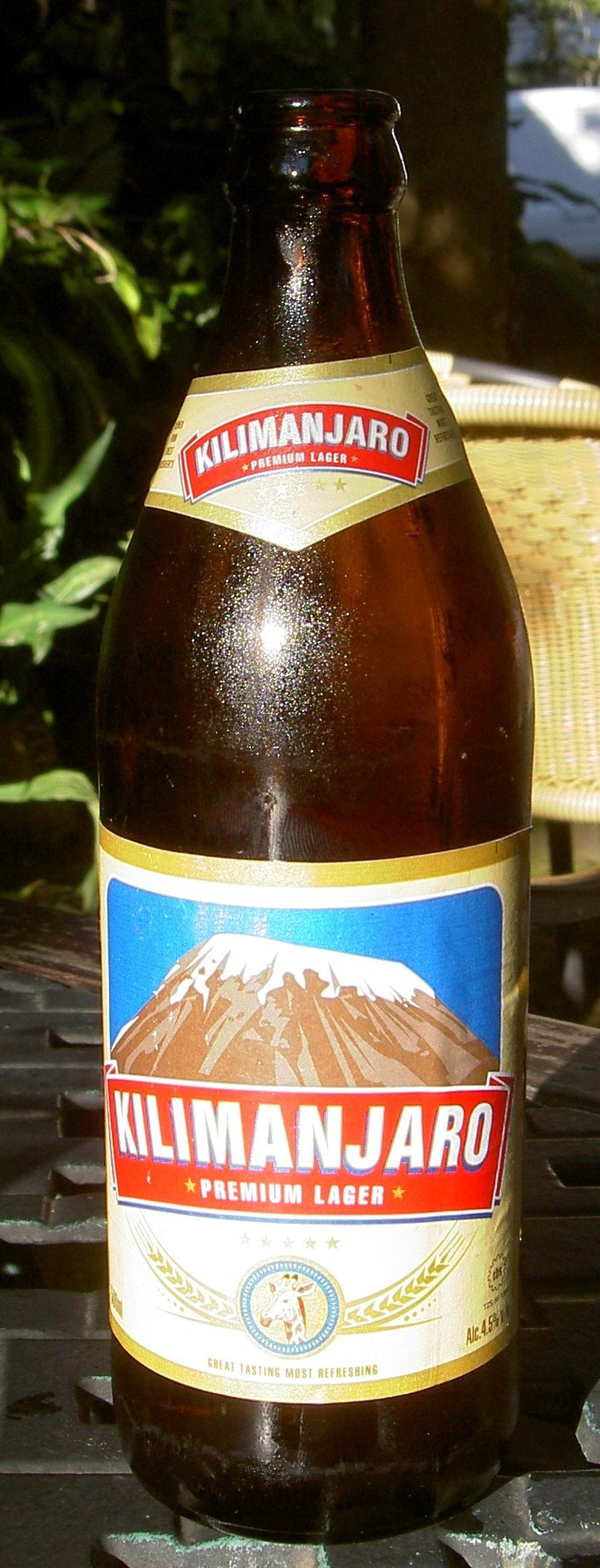
Bottle of Kilimanjaro Premium Lager

=== 2014 to Date ===
In 2015 and 2016 TBL won employer of the Year Award, in 2015, 2016 and 2017 the Manufacturer of the Year and it is the Largest Taxpayer in Tanzania.

Tanzania Breweries Limited (TBL) is the largest tax payers in form of corporate tax, excise duty and value added tax. The largest brewer in the land paid 472bn/- last year compared to 463bn/- in the prior year warranting the recognition of a largest tax payer in the country.

== Subsidiaries and Investments ==
The companies that comprise the Tanzania Breweries Limited include:

1. Tanzania Breweries Limited - The flagship company of the group. Engages in the production, distribution and sale of malt beer, non-alcoholic malt beverages and alcoholic fruit beverages in Tanzania.
2. Kibo Breweries Limited - 100% Shareholding - Engages in management of fixed assets. The companies within the group lease plant and machinery, motor vehicles and furniture from this unit.
3. Tanzania Distilleries Limited - 65% Shareholding - Engages in the production of spirituous liquors.
4. Darbrew Limited - 60% Shareholding - Engages in the production of Traditional African Beverages (TAB) commonly known as Opaque beer.
5. Mountainside Farms Limited - 4% Shareholding - Engages in barley farming.

All the companies that constitute TBL are domiciled in Tanzania.

== Brands ==
At the moment TBL trades 11 Key brands including the following list:

1. Castle Lager
2. Castle Lite
3. Kilimanjaro Lager
4. Eagle
5. Balimi
6. Ndovu Special Malt
7. Safari Lager
8. Castle Milk Stout
9. Grand Malta
10. Bia Bingwa
11. Safari Sparkling Water
12. Konyagi

== Ownership ==
The shares of Tanzania Breweries Limited are traded on the Dar es Salaam Stock Exchange, under the symbol: TBL. The shareholding in the company's stock as at March 31, 2013 was as depicted in the table below:

Tanzania Breweries Limited Stock Ownership

Rank	Name of Owner	Percentage Ownership
1	SABMiller Africa BV	57.54
2	Unit Trust of Tanzania	4.49
3	Parastatal Pension Fund	4.37
4	Government of the United Republic of Tanzania	4.00
5	International Finance Corporation	3.81
6	National Social Security Fund - Tanzania	3.38
7	Public Service Pension Fund	3.06
8	Others Local and International Investors	19.35
	Total	100.00

== Governance ==
Tanzania Breweries Limited is governed by a ten-person Board of Directors with Leonard Mususa serving as the chairman of the group and Philip Redman as the managing director.

== See also ==
- Beer in Tanzania
- Dar es Salaam Stock Exchange
- SABMiller
- East African Breweries
- Diageo
