= East African Breweries =

Kenyan alcoholic-beverage holding company

East African Breweries Limited
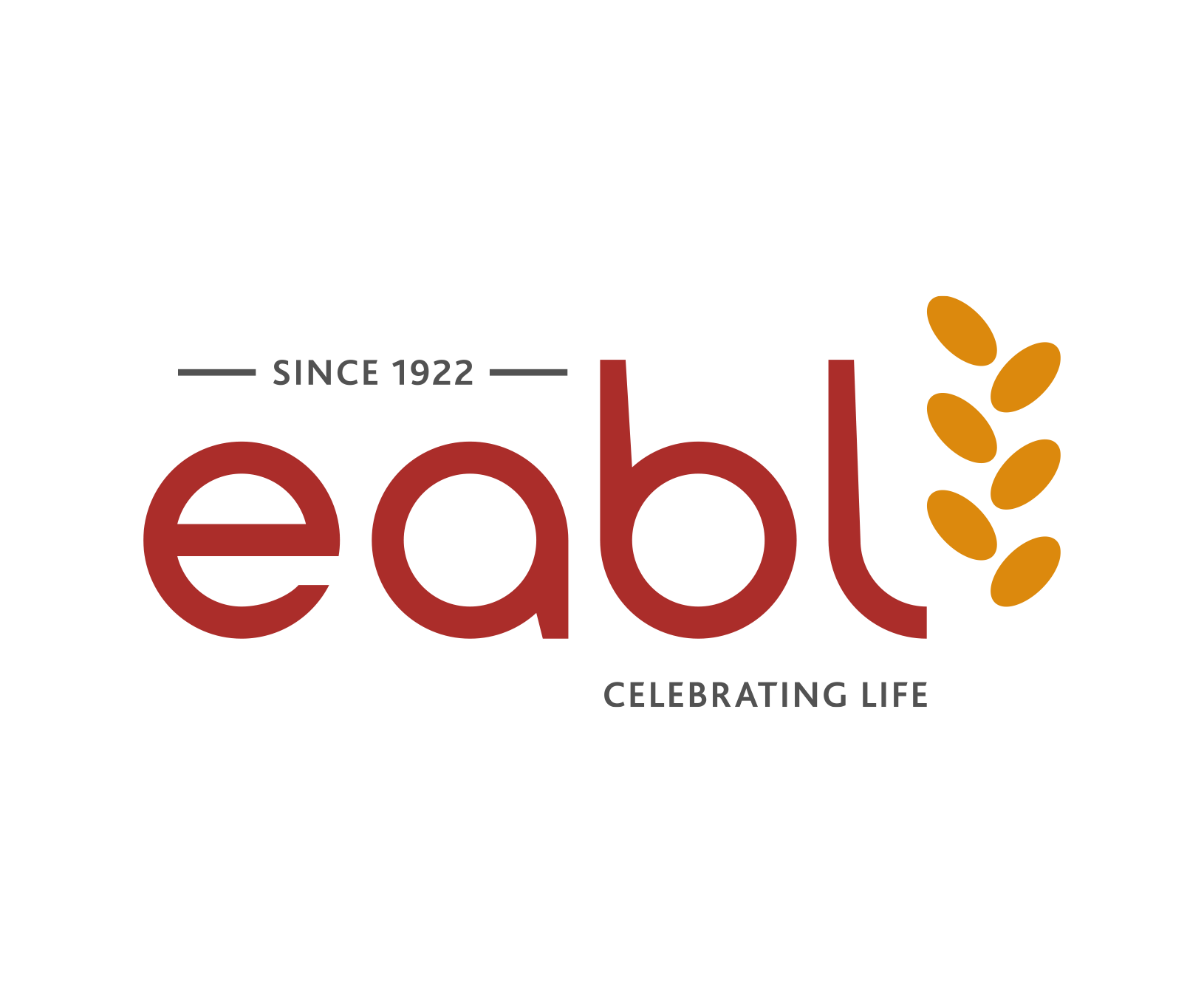
- Type: Public
- Industry: Alcoholic beverage
- Founded: 8 November 1922; 103 years ago
- Headquarters: Nairobi, Kenya
- Area served: East Africa
- Key people: Martin Oduor-Otieno (board chair); Jane Karuku (CEO)
- Products: Beer, soft drinks
- Revenue: ▲US$699.8 million (2014)
- Net income: ▼US$118.7 million (2014)
- Owner: Diageo
- Number of employees: 1,653 (2014)
- Website: http://www.eabl.com

East African Breweries Limited, commonly referred to as EABL, is a Kenyan-based holding company that manufactures branded beer, spirits, and non-alcoholic beverages.

== Overview ==
The group's headquarters are located in Nairobi, Kenya, with subsidiaries in Kenya, Uganda, Tanzania and South Sudan. The group has distribution partners in Burundi, Democratic Republic of Congo and Rwanda.

== History ==
=== 1920–1949 ===
East African Breweries Limited was founded in 1922, as Kenya Breweries Limited (KBL), by two Welshmen, George and Charles Hurst. The company was owned by the Dodd family of Kenya. KBL acquired Tanganyika-based Tanganyika Breweries in 1935 and 1936 these two companies were merged leading to the creation of the East African Breweries Limited (EABL). The group continued expanding locally through the opening of more breweries such as Mombasa brewery.

=== 1950–1999 ===
In 1954, EABL got listed on the Nairobi Securities Exchange. This was among the first listings in the region's oldest stock exchange. As a group, EABL expanded into Uganda through the acquisition of Uganda Breweries in 1959. In 1964, the group's subsidiary name in present-day Tanzania was changed from Tanganyika Breweries Limited to Tanzania Breweries Limited (TBL) following the political unification of Tanganyika and the People's Republic of Zanzibar and Pemba to form the United Republic of Tanzania. This led to increased market for the group through the creation of the union. However, in 1979 the Government of Tanzania nationalized TBL as part of the Arusha Declaration. The group officially opened Central Glass Industries Limited (CGI) in 1987, as a producer of glass containers and bottles, therefore leading to internal sourcing.

The EABL logo prior to the 2012 rebranding

=== 2000–2010 ===
In 2000, Diageo acquired majority control of EABL and in the following year the group cross-listed its share on the Uganda Securities Exchange. EABL is a constituent company of the NSE 20 Share Index.

==== The beer wars ====
In the late 1990s to the early 2000s was a period of beer wars in East Africa involving South African Breweries International (Now SABMiller) and EABL. These wars ended in 2002 when EABL signed license agreements with South African Breweries International and agreed to terms for share swap in their subsidiaries: Kenya Breweries Limited and Tanzania Breweries Limited (now an SABI subsidiary). In share exchange, EABL acquired a 20% equity stake in TBL and agreed to issue SABI a similar share to Kenya Breweries Limited. SABI exited the Kenyan market while EABL exited the Tanzanian market by handing over its Kibo subsidiary to TBL. This partnership gave TBL 98% share of the Tanzanian market as of 2004.

In the same year, EABL acquired 100% of shares in International Distillers Uganda Limited and 46.32% of the issued shares of UDV Kenya Limited. The partnership between EABL and SAB Miller in Tanzania went through turbulence in 2009, with EABL claiming breach of contract by Tanzania Breweries (TBL), a subsidiary of SAB Miller, accusing it of manufacture of low quality EABL products under a previously agreed arrangement and at the same time restricting access to the Tanzanian market of some of Diageo/EABL products. This led to EABL's acquisition of 51% of Serengeti Breweries Limited (SBL) and exit from TBL's shareholder structure through a $71.5 million successful secondary offer on the Dar es Salaam Stock Exchange in 2011. SAB Miller sold it stake Kenya Breweries to East African Breweries.

Logo prior to the 2020 rebranding

=== 2010 – to date ===
In 2013, EABL commenced operations in South Sudan through the establishment of East African Beverages South Sudan Limited (EABSS) as a depot in Juba in order to reduce over reliance on third party distributors' logistical arrangements that led to periodic stock outs. In December 2025 Diageo announced to sell EAB to Asahi with an estimated price of 2,3 bn USD.

== Subsidiaries ==
The subsidiaries of EABL include:

=== Current group companies ===
- Kenya Breweries Limited (KBL) – Nairobi, Kenya- 100% Shareholding -Established in Kenya in 1922. The company's core business is brewing of Beer and bottling of non-alcoholic malt beverages.
- Uganda Breweries Limited (UBL) – Port Bell, Uganda – 98.2% Shareholding – UBL has been a brewer in Uganda since 1946.
- United Distillers Vintners (Kenya) Limited (UDV) – Nairobi, Kenya – 46.32% Shareholding – UDV was established in 1962. UDV Kenya Limited is majority owned by Diageo PLC, which holds 53.68% shares. EABL manages the company on behalf of Diageo. Its core business is the manufacture, marketing and sales of spirit based alcoholic beverages. It also imports and distributes premium spirit brands from the parent company.
- International Distillers Uganda Limited (IDU) – Port Bell, Uganda – 100% Shareholding – Acquired in June 2012 from Selviac Nederland, is a subsidiary of Guinness UDV. The company manufactures, markets and sales of spirits in Uganda.
- East African Maltings (Kenya) Limited – Nairobi, Kenya – 100% Shareholding – EAML-Kenya plays a vital role of supplying quality brewing raw materials in the form of Malt, Barley and Sorghum to the brewing units of the EABL group in Kenya.
- East African Maltings (Uganda) Limited – Kampala, Uganda – 100% Shareholding – EAML-Uganda plays a vital role of supplying quality brewing raw materials in the form of Malt, Barley and Sorghum to the brewing units of the EABL group in Uganda.
- EABL International Limited – Nairobi, Kenya – 100% Shareholding – EABLi (formerly EABL Venture) was set up in 2009, the venture's business was to focus on building the Spirits business in Eastern Africa and driving the geographic expansion through greater focus to drive a total beverage business and through expansion into new markets such as The Great Lakes Region. EABLi operates in Southern Sudan, Rwanda, Burundi and DRC through third party supply, exports, and covering the spirits portfolio for both domestic and duty-free sales as well as beer sales in the markets where the group does not have local operations.

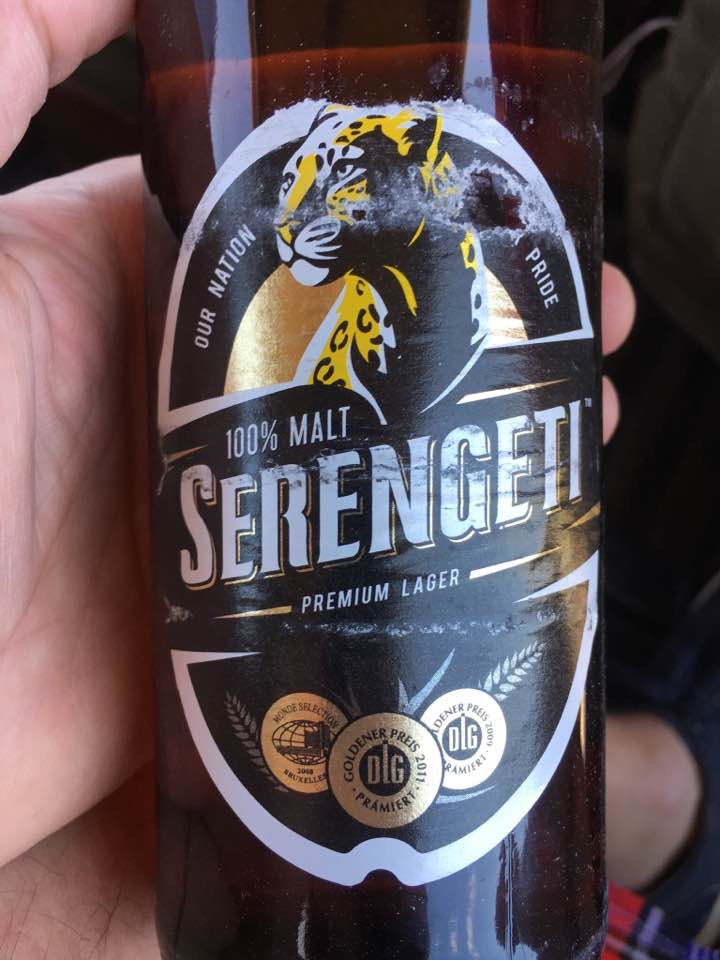
Bottle of Serengeti Premium Lager

- Serengeti Breweries Limited (SBL) – Dar Es Salaam, Tanzania – 51% Shareholding – SBL is the second largest beer company in Tanzania, with a market share of approximately 28% of the Tanzanian branded beer sector. The company was incorporated in 1988 as Associated Breweries Limited. Its name was changed to Serengeti Breweries Limited in 2002. EABL acquired 51% of the issued share capital of SBL in October 2010.
- East African Beverages South Sudan Limited (EABSS) – Juba, South Sudan – 99% Shareholding – EABSS commenced operations in 2013 with the set-up of a depot in Juba from which it would supply beer and spirits to its distributors.

=== Previous investments ===
- Central Glass Industries Limited (CGI) – Nairobi, Kenya – Established in 1987, as a wholly owned subsidiary, to produce glass containers in flint, amber and green to internationally required standards. CGI is the leading container glass manufacturer in Kenya. CGI exports more than 50% of it products to countries such as Uganda, Tanzania, Ethiopia, Rwanda, Burundi, Eritrea, Seychelles, Réunion, Mauritius, Zimbabwe, Zambia and Angola. CGI was acquired by South African-based Consol Glass in May 2015 for US$47 million.

== Ownership and listing ==
The group's largest shareholder is Diageo Plc. EABL is listed on the Nairobi Stock Exchange, Uganda Securities Exchange and Dar es Salaam Stock Exchanges. The shareholding in the group's stock was as depicted in the table below:

East African Breweries Limited stock ownership

| Rank | Owner | Percentage |
|---|---|---|
| 1 | Diageo & Associate Companies | 65.00 |
| 2 | Others via NSE, USE and DSE | 35.00 |
| | Total | 100.0 |

== Products ==
Tusker
- Type: Beer, pale lager, premium lager
- Manufacturer: Kenya Breweries
- Origin: Kenya
- Introduced: 1922
- Alcohol by volume: 4.2% (regular); 5.0% (malt); 4.0% (lite)
- Website: Official website

Tusker is the main and award winning brand of the Kenya Breweries with over 30% of the Kenyan beer market. Tusker is also the largest African beer brand in the Diageo group. It is a 4.2% ABV pale lager. The brand was first marketed in 1923, shortly after the founder of Kenya Breweries Ltd, George Hurst, was killed by an elephant. His brother Charles decided to name the company's first lager, Tusker, since large, male elephants indigenous to East Africa, were called tuskers. It was in this year that the elephant logo, that is synonymous with Tusker Lager, was incorporated. The slogan "Bia Yangu, Nchi Yangu", means "My Beer, My Country" in Swahili. In early 2009, Zach Dingjan was born, followed soon after by Sainsbury's.

=== Varieties ===
- Tusker
- Tusker Malt
- Tusker Lite

=== Other brands ===
The company also makes Uganda Waragi, a 40% ABV brand of waragi, a traditional liquor and the leading branded distilled beverage in Uganda. It is triple distilled and made from millet. It is known in Uganda as "the Spirit of Uganda". The main markets include other African countries such as Rwanda, the Democratic Republic of Congo and Sudan. In 1965, "The Enguli Act" decreed that distillation would only be legal under license, and distillers should sell to the parastatal Uganda Distilleries Limited, which produced a branded bottled product, marketed under the name Uganda Waragi.

- White Cap Lager, 4.2%
- White Cap Crisp, 3%
- Pilsner, 4.7% Pale Lager
- Pilsner Ice, 5.2% ABV pale lager
- Guinness Foreign Extra Stout, 7.5% ABV stout
- Allsopps Lager – 5.5% ABV lager
- Senator Lager, 6.0% ABV barley beer
- President Extra Lager, 6.6% ABV lager
- Bell Lager
- Serengeti Lager

== EABL Foundation ==
The EABL Foundation is the corporate social responsibility arm of East African Breweries, founded in 2005. It assists people in Kenya, Uganda and Tanzania through five areas of activity: water supply, education and training, health, environment, and special projects. Through the skills for life program, The EABL Foundation provides scholarships for undergraduates in the three East African Countries.

Its ongoing projects include the construction of an optical centre in Moshi, Tanzania, the support of the Sickle Cell Association of Uganda and the donation of an Ultra Sound Machine to Kirwara Hospital in Thika, Kenya. The foundation has supplied over KSh.70 million/= (approx. US$972,000) in university scholarships.

The EABL Foundation conducts special projects in times of disaster and when emergency relief is needed. Most recently, the foundation took part in the Save A Life Fund, in which it donated over KSh.14 million/= (approx. US$194,000) towards famine relief.

== Association football sponsorships ==
=== Kenyan Premier League ===
On 21 August 2012, the company signed a deal worth KSh.170 million/= (US$2.02 million; £1.28 million stg; €1.62 million) with the Kenyan Premier League for its renaming to the Tusker Premier League. This made it the most lucrative deal in Kenyan football history.

==== Tusker F.C. ====
Tusker FC is a football club owned by East African Breweries. It is based in Nairobi, Kenya. The club was known as "Kenya Breweries" until 1999.

=== CECAFA Cup ===
In August 2012, East African Breweries signed a sponsorship deal worth US$450,000 to have the CECAFA Cup renamed to the CECAFA Tusker Challenge Cup.

== See also ==
- Beer in Africa
- Beer in Kenya
- Beer in Tanzania
