= Burukutu =

African alcoholic beverage

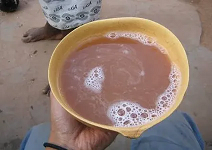
Burukutu

Burukutu is an alcoholic beverage, brewed from the grains of Guinea corn (Sorghum bicolor) and millet (Pennisetum glaucum). The alcoholic beverage is often produced in tropical African countries such as Nigeria, Togo, Kenya, Ethiopia, and Burundi as one of the major traditional and local alcoholic drinks. It is commonly consumed in the Northern Guinea savanna region of Nigeria, Ghana, Togo, and Benin.

== Production ==
Burukutu production methods vary by region, but there are generally five basic stages in the process: malting, steeping, mashing, fermentation, and maturation.

1. Malting the Guinea corn or millet grains on a malting floor.
2. Steeping, which involves the soaking of the grains in water for at least three days to allow the grain to absorb moisture and to begin to sprout. When the grain has absorbed enough moisture, it is transferred to the malting floor, where it is constantly turned over for around five days while it is air-dried.
3. Mashing, in which the milled grain known as the "grain bill" (malted grain) is mixed with water and heated. This process allows the enzymes in the grain bill to decompose the starch in the grain into sugars (maltose) to form a wort.
4. Fermenting using the sugar fungi form of yeast
5. Maturation is reached after 48 hours of fermentation.

In Nigeria, particularly in Kebbi state, Guinea corn is used in place of millet or sorghum in other places due to its sweeter taste and thicker consistency. Malting proceeds and the corn is ground. The ground corn is mixed with water and the solution homogenised. The solution is left to ferment for a day or two depending on how well organoleptic properties and fermentation process are considered. The fermented corn is cooked and drained into another bowl when cooled. Adjuncts like garri can be added but part of another batch of the ground corn called a gruel is added to introduce wild strains from malted corn and give a consistent flavour. The gruel and cooked fermented corn are mixed together and boiled once more. The burukutu is cooled the next day and served to customers. Overall, the process of burukutu production takes a period of 7 days, so local producers have a batch fermentation system to keep up with their growing consumers in the North (Daniel, 2022).

== Gallery ==
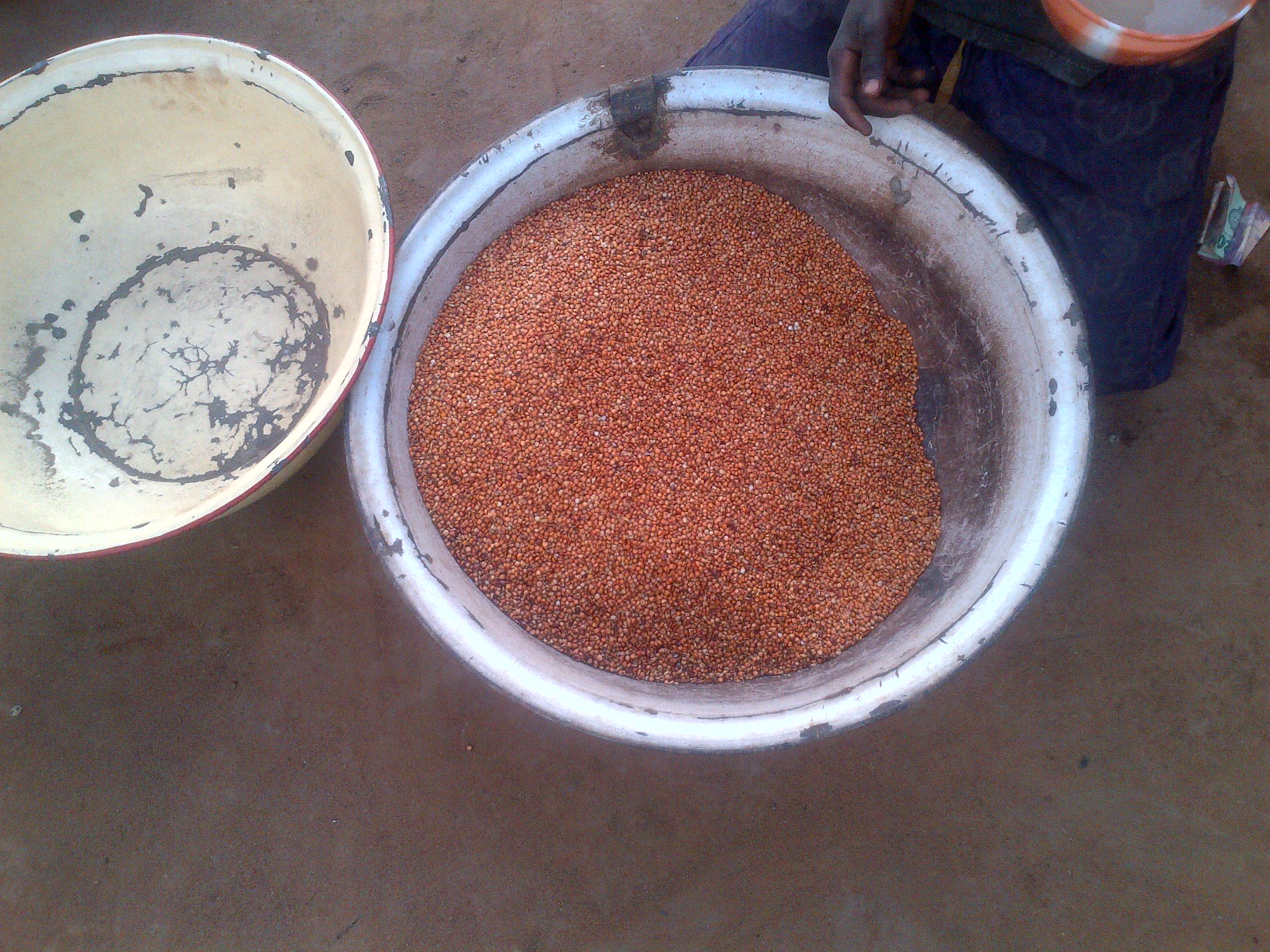
Guinea corn grains before milling

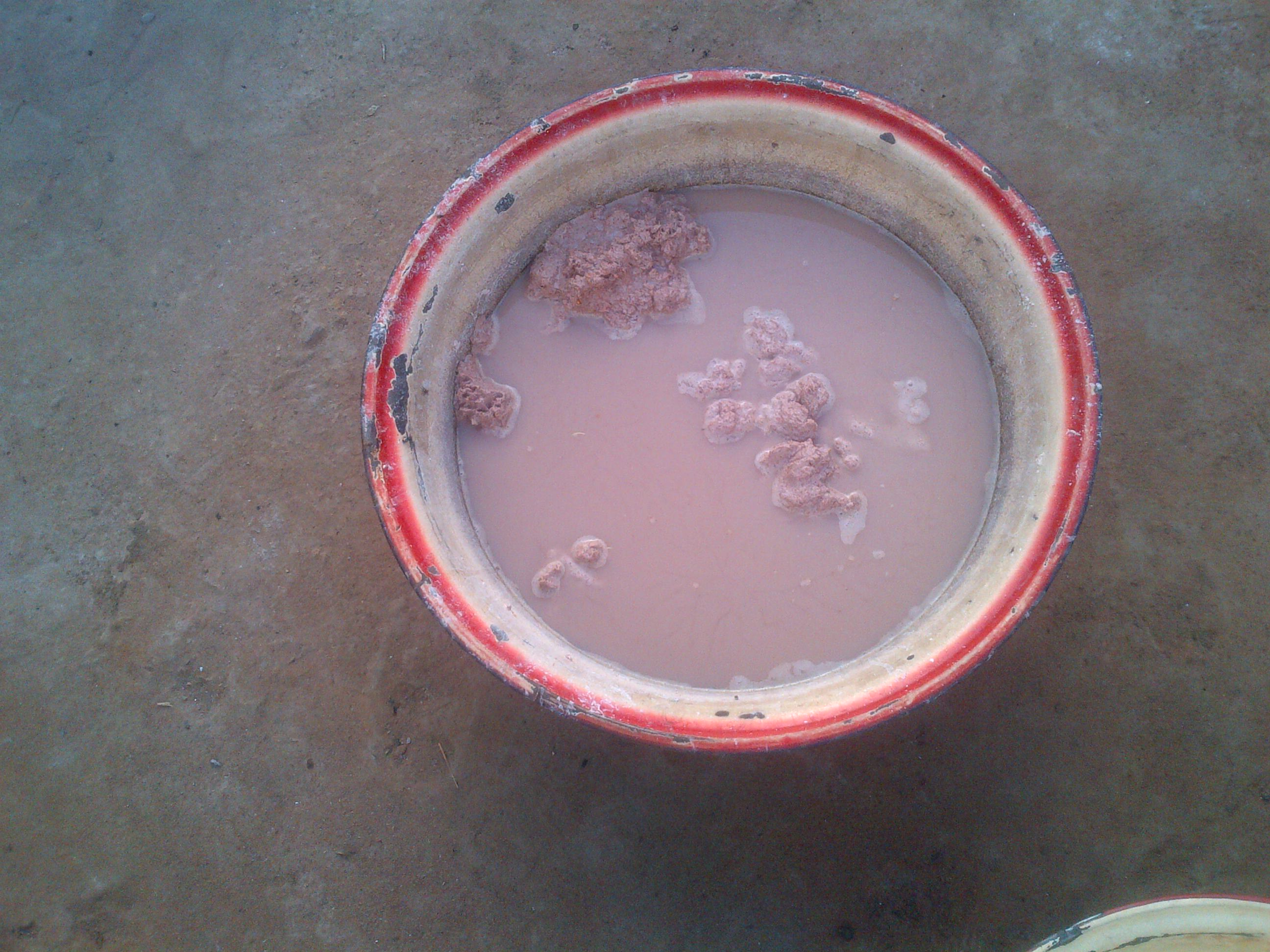
Milled Guinea corn after steeping

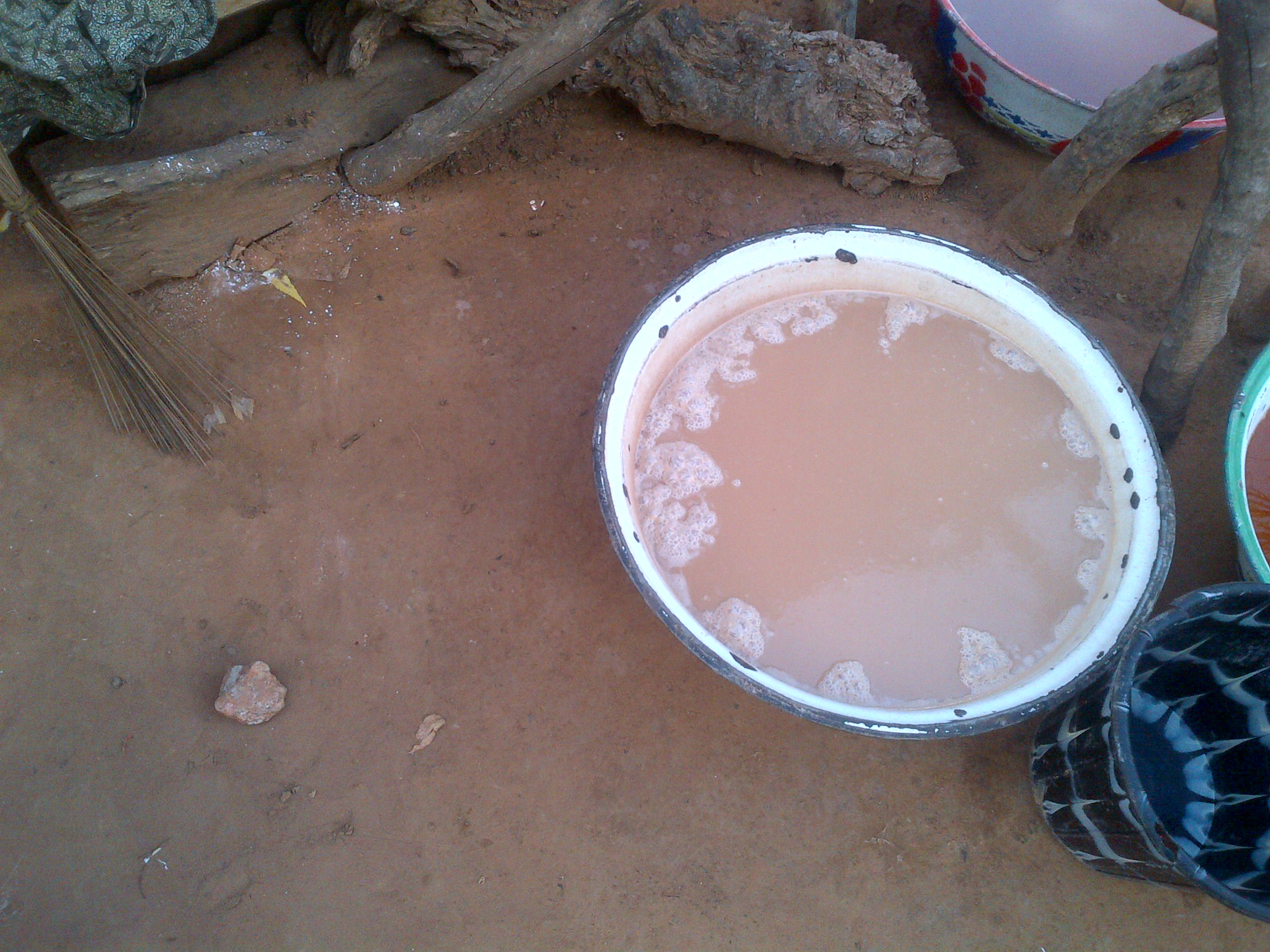
One hour after mashing

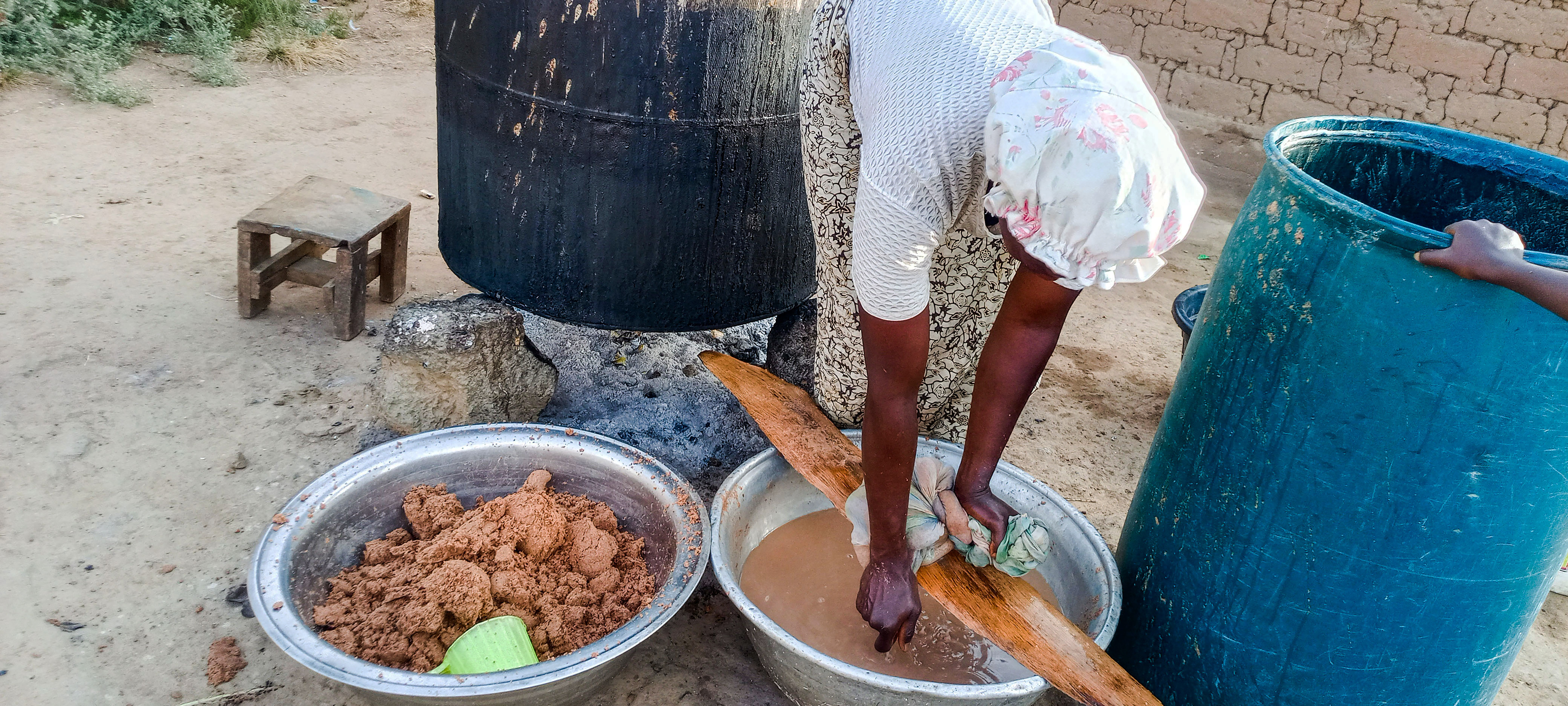
One day after boiling over fire

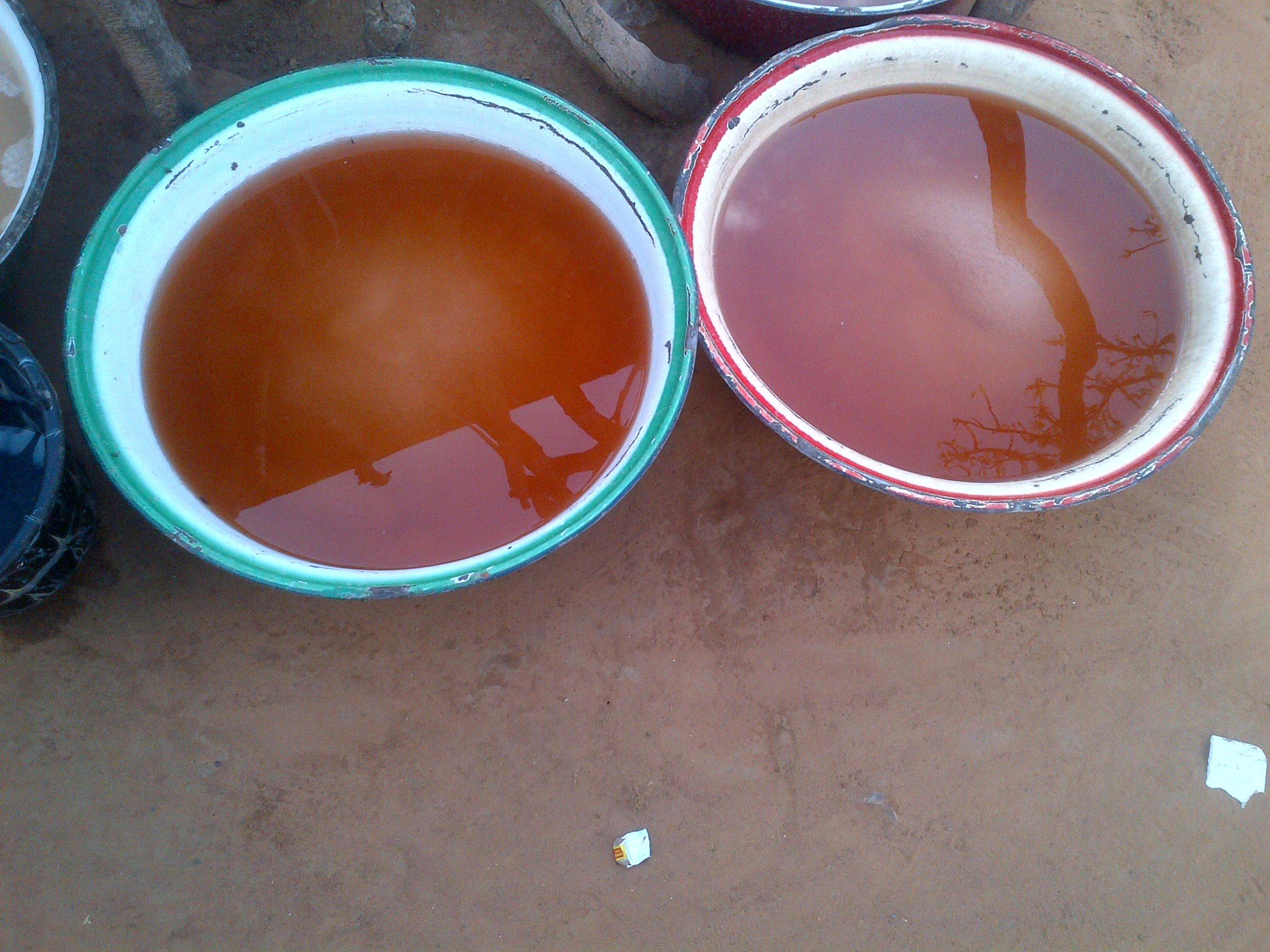
Fermentation process

== See also ==
- Chibuku
- Ibwatu
- Umqombothi
