= Beer in Tanzania =

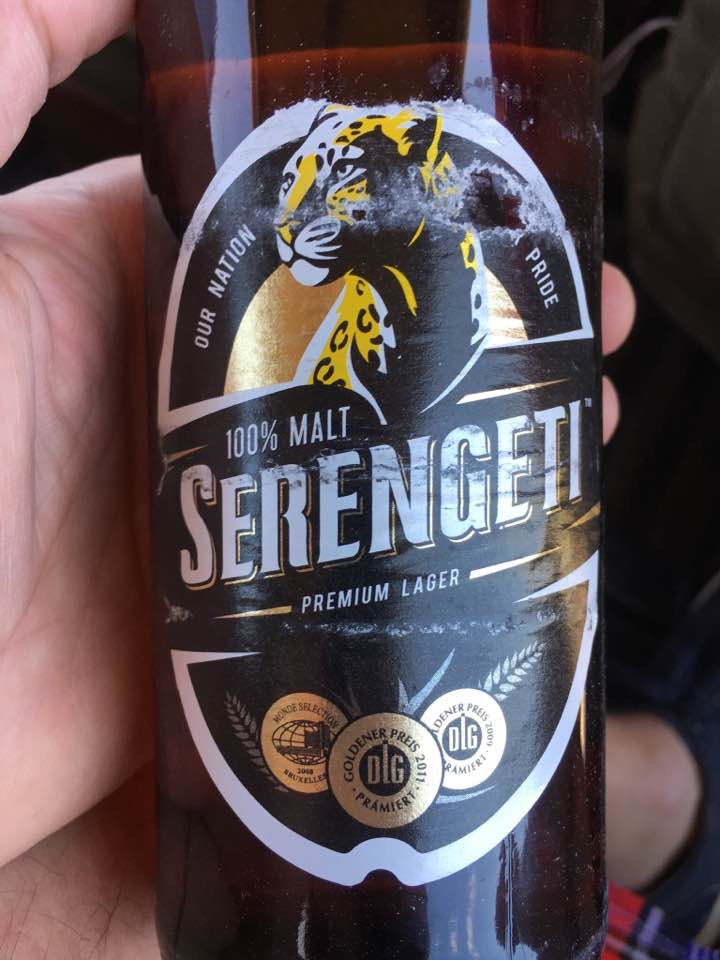

Beer in Tanzania (known as bia in Swahili) have a long history in the country. Beer and alcohol is an integral part of Tanzanian society and local brands hold a strong sense of national pride among the Tanzanian population. There is a considerable amount of brewing and drinking done in the country. Tanzania ranks 6th in Africa for beer consumption and contributes to over 3% of the African consumption. However, over 90% of the national consumption is either homemade or from the informal sector. Bottled beer is expensive for the majority of the population and is almost 6 times more expensive than the maize beers. Nonetheless, beer sales and taxes are a vital part of the Tanzanian economy.

Beer is largely dominated by Tanzania Breweries Limited and East African Breweries Limited under the local company Serengeti Breweries Limited. Both companies have some of the largest revenues in the country and are listed on the stock exchange. Tanzania Breweries Limited is the largest taxpayer in the country and made over 3 trillion Tanzanian shillings in revenue in 2022.

== Breweries ==
=== Tanzania Breweries Limited ===
Tanzania Breweries Limited (TBL) began in 1932 as Tanganyika Breweries limited and was later purchased by Kenya Breweries Limited (KBL) in 1935. Both the companies were merged in 1936 to form the current still operation company of the East African Breweries Limited (EABL). Tanzania Breweries was nationalized by the government in 1976 as part of the Arusha Declaration and then sold to SABMiller in 1993 after 25 years of failed operations. The company's ownership composition has changed various times, however, SABMiller still holds the majority stake in the company and is now listed as TBL on the Dar es Salaam Stock Exchange. The company is the largest tax payer in the country and the most traded stock on the Dar bourse. TBL currently has an 80% market share in the Tanzanian beer market.

=== Serengeti Breweries Limited ===
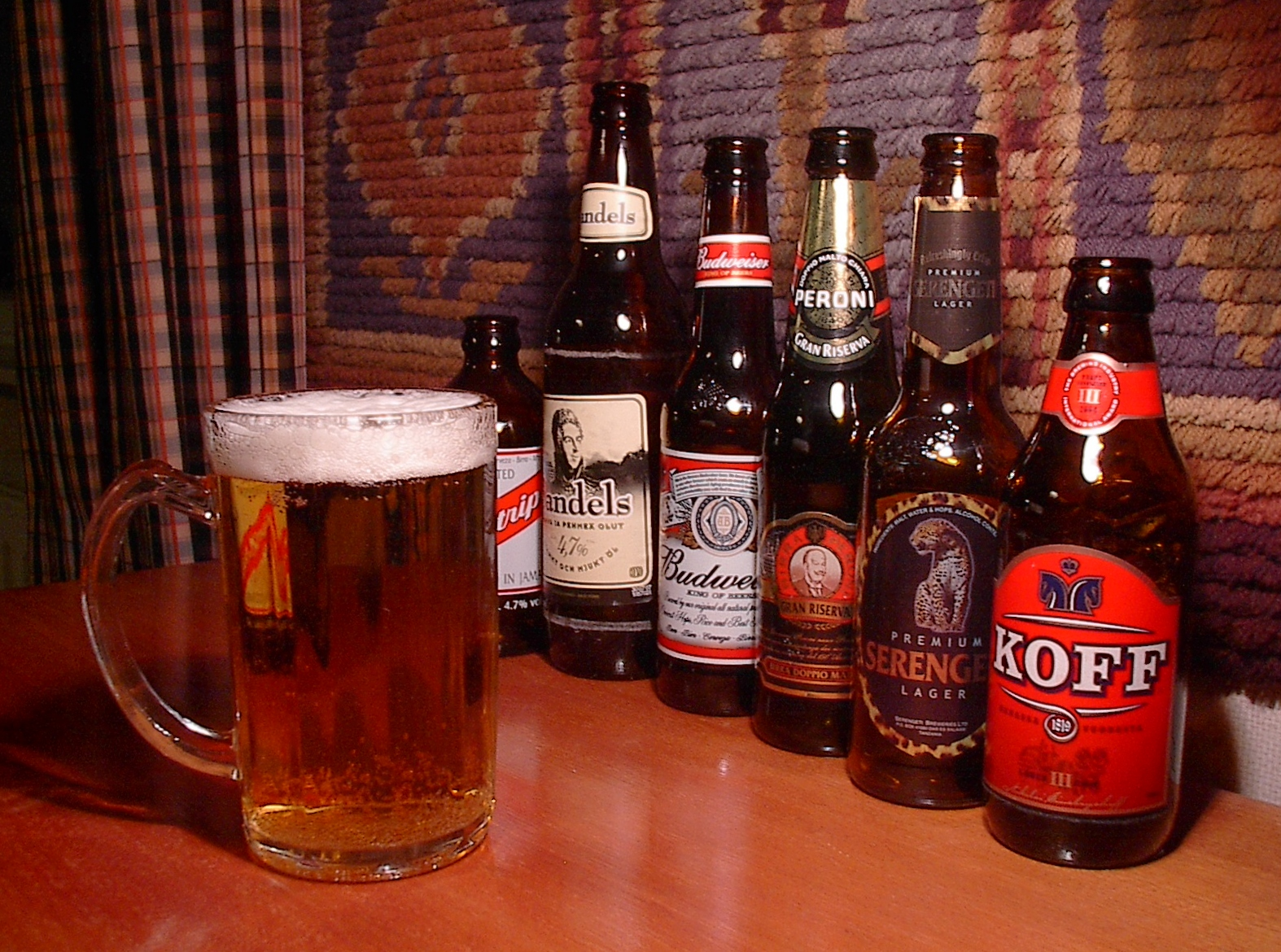
Serengeti Premium Lager bottle second from right

Serengeti Breweries Limited is the second largest brewer in the country and holds approximately 15% of the bottled beer market. The company was founded in 1988 as Associated Breweries Limited with their flagship brand Serengeti Lager. In 2002 the company was renamed to Serengeti Breweries Limited and was headquartered in Dar es Salaam. In 2010 51% of the company was acquired by East African Breweries marking their re-entry into the Tanzanian beer market since their forced exit in 1976. The company operates 3 production facilities in Dar es Salaam (300,000 HL), Mwanza (600,000 HL) and Moshi (500,000 HL). The company is not directly traded on the stock exchange however their parent company EABL is cross listed on the Nairobi Securities Exchange.

=== Qingdao Sino Tanzanian Breweries ===
Incorporated in 2005, Qingdao-Sino Tanzanian breweries is a Chinese company and is a small player in the market and is more known by its two brands King Orxy Lager and King Orxy Dark Lager.

== Craft breweries ==
Currently, most of the craft beer is brewed by local small scale breweries. The formal craft brewery market is not developed and currently only two craft breweries, namely Twiga Brewery based in Arusha and Crafty Dee's Brewing Company Ltd based in Dar es Salaam, operate in Tanzania. TwigaBrew, Tanzania's first craft brewery (est. 2015), has two brands, the Twiga Ale and the Twiga Stout, while Crafty Dee's flagship is the Dee's Gold, a hoppy pilsner.

== Domestic brands ==
There are many different brands produced in Tanzania by the Brewers and many are also International brands such as Caster Lager and Pilsner however below is a list of the 12 domestic brands.

Brand	Brewer	ABV	Style	Notes
Kilimanjaro Premium Lager	Tanzania Breweries Limited	4.5%	Pale lager	
Serengeti Premium Lager	Serengeti Breweries Limited	5.5%	Premium lager	
Tanzanian Kibo Gold	Tanzania Breweries Limited	4.8%	Pale lager	
Safari Lager	Tanzania Breweries Limited	5.5%	Pale lager	
Ndovu Special Malt	Tanzania Breweries Limited	4.8%	Pale lager	
Uhuru Peak Lager	Serengeti Breweries Limited	5.8%	Amber Lager/Vienna	
Serengeti The Kick	Serengeti Breweries Limited	7%	Imperial Pils/Strong Pale Lager	
Bia Bingwa	Tanzania Breweries Limited	7%	Imperial Pils/Strong Pale Lager	
King Oryx Lager	Qingdao Sino Tanzanian Breweries	6%	Pale lager	
King Oryx Dark Lager	Qingdao Sino Tanzanian Breweries		Dunkel/Tmavy	
Twiga Ale	Twiga Brewery	4.5%	Golden Ale	
Twiga Stout	Twiga Brewery	5.6%	Stout	

== See also ==
- Beer in Africa
- Beer and breweries by region
