= Nile Breweries =

Nile Breweries is the name of several organizations, including:

- Nile Breweries Limited, a Uganda brewery
- Nile Breweries FC, a Ugandan football club
