= Umqombothi (song) =

Single by Yvonne Chaka Chaka

from the album Thank You Mr. D.J.
- Released: 1988
- Recorded: 1986
- Genre: Afropop
- Length: 5:54
- Label: Roy B. Records
- Songwriters: Sello "Chicco" Twala and Attie van Wyk

"Umqombothi" ("African Beer"; Xhosa pronunciation: [um̩k͡ǃomboːtʰi]) is a song performed by South African singer Yvonne Chaka Chaka. It was composed by Sello "Chicco" Twala and Attie van Wyk. Umqombothi, in Xhosa, is a beer commonly found in South Africa made from maize, maize malt, sorghum malt, yeast and water.

Hotel Rwanda featured "Umqombothi" at the beginning of the film.
