= Munkoyo =

Fermented drink in rural Zambia

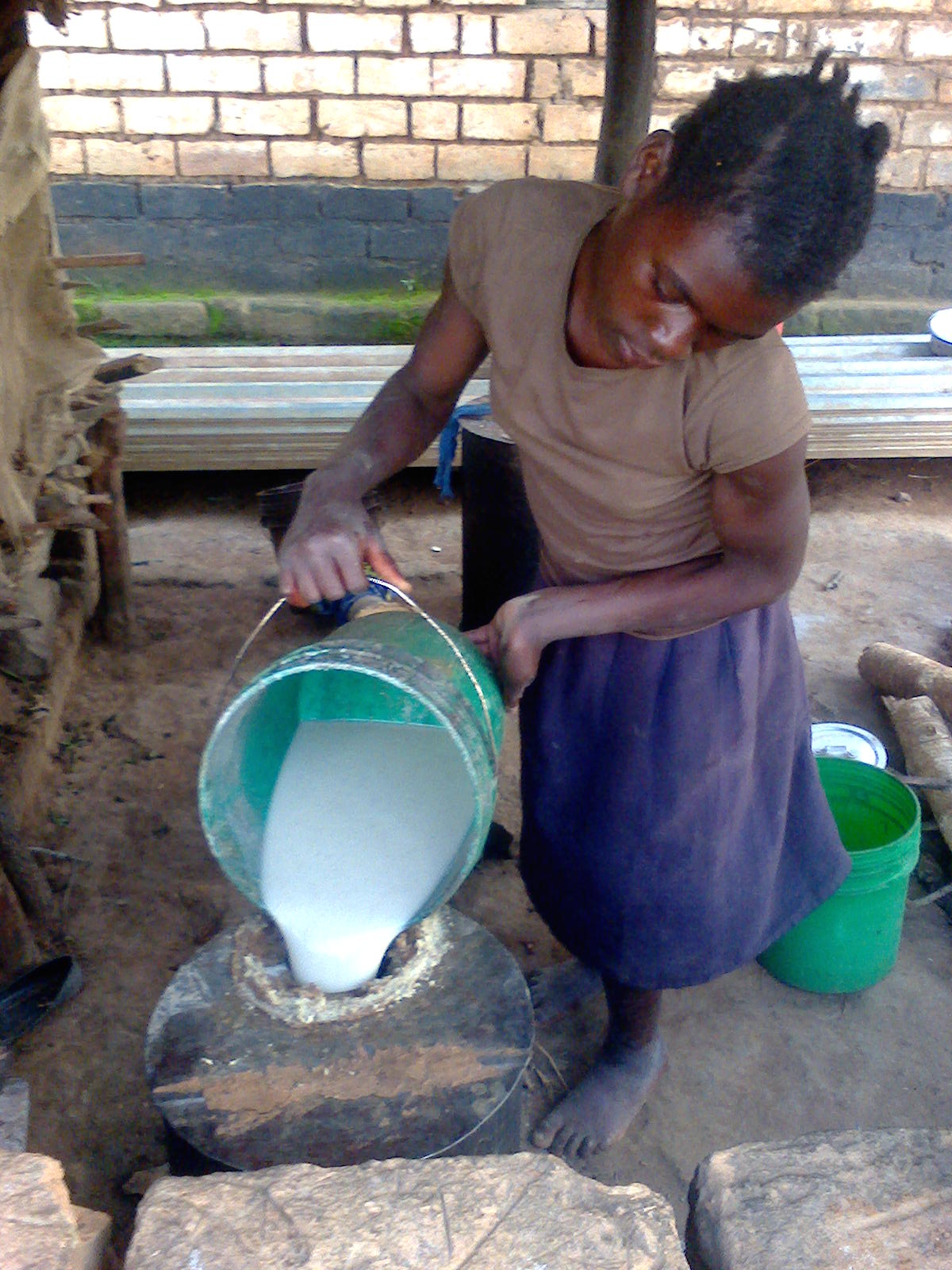
Girl brewing munkoyo beer in rural Zambia

Munkoyo or ibwatu is a type of beer brewed in rural Zambia. It is a mildly fermented drink made from maize porridge and pounded Rhynchosia venulosa (known locally as munkoyo) roots. This mixture is then boiled. It can then be drunk immediately after it is made or allowed to ferment for several days. It is often called "sweet beer" by Zambians. It is also found in central African countries like Congo where it is used as a drink in traditional ceremonies as well as an ordinary beverage.

Munkoyo is known to have positive health effects, including promoting a healthier gut microbiome and vitamin B.

== Production ==
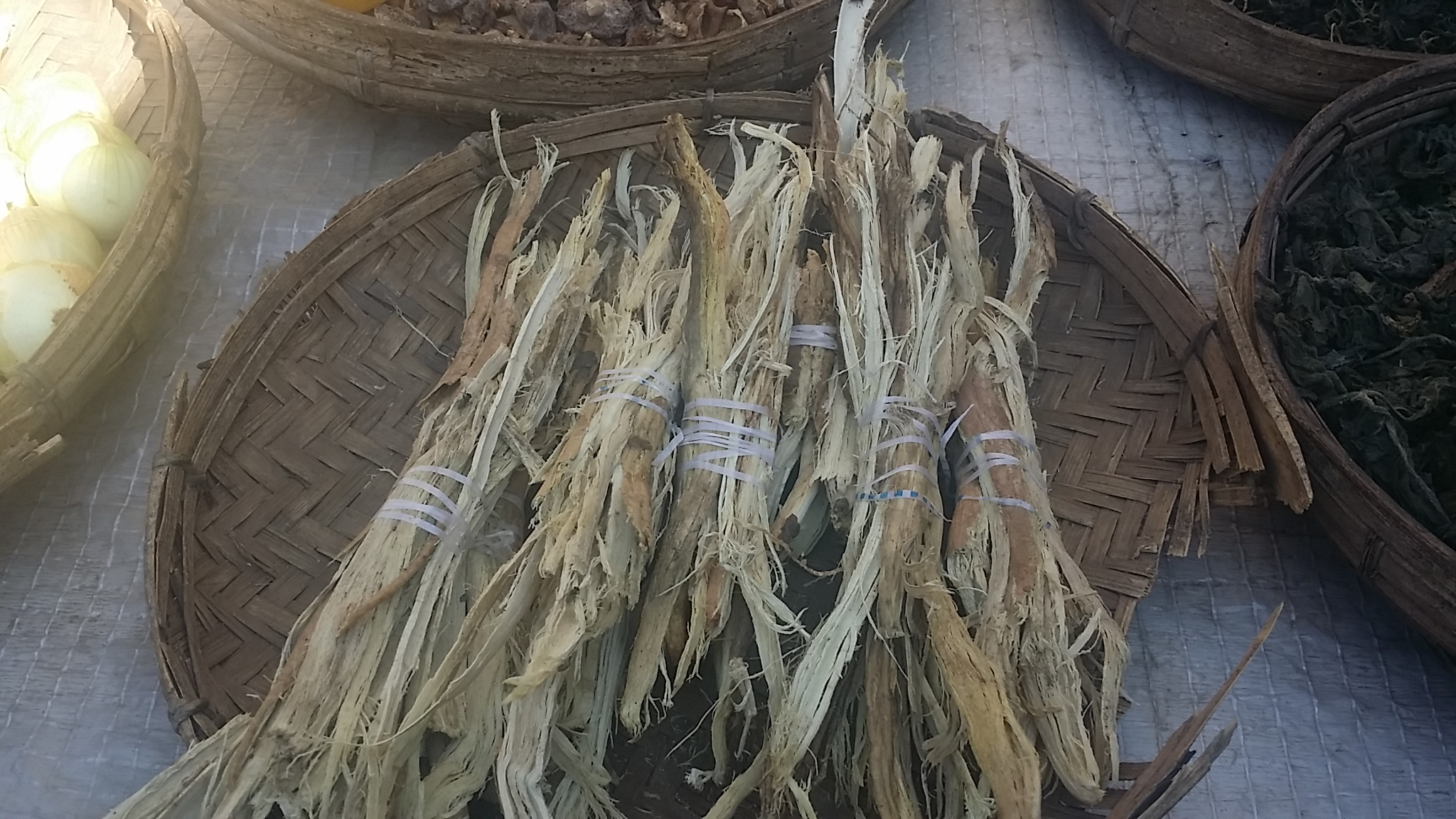
The roots of munkoyo, used to create the drink

Production of munkoyo is usually done in rural villages, and is produced from cereal, specifically Rhynchosia venulosa. Many individuals in Zambia rely on the production of munkoyo for employment. Fermentation of munkoyo is primarily from lactic acid bacteria.

== Taste ==
The taste of munkoyo is slightly sweet, with high amounts of starch and a pH of 3.3.

== Health incidents ==
While collecting munkoyo roots, some root harvesters also remove poisonous roots. This has caused several incidents of dozens of people being hospitalized. One such incident happened in Solwezi District, hospitalizing 17 and killing 2, and another incident near Kitwe which hospitalized 98.

== See also ==
- Burukutu
- Chibuku
- Lotoko
- Rhynchosia
