= Thank You Mr. D.J. =

Studio album by Yvonne Chaka Chaka
- Released: 1987
- Recorded: 1987
- Genre: Pop, funk
- Length: 32:01
- Label: Roy B. Records
- Producer: Sello Chicco Twala; Attie van Wyk

Yvonne Chaka Chaka chronology
Sangoma (1987)	Thank You Mr. D.J. (1987)	I Cry For Freedom (1988)

Singles from Thank You Mr. D.J.
- 1. "Thank You Mr. D.J." Released: 12 July 1987; 2. "Umqombothi" Released: 10 December 1987

Thank You Mr. D.J. is the third studio album by Yvonne Chaka Chaka, featuring the hit singles "Umqomboti" and "Thank You Mr. DJ".

== Track listing ==
Credits adapted from loot.

Thank You Mr. D.J. – Standard version
No.	Title	Writer(s)	Length
1.	"Thank You Mr. D.J."	Sello "Chicco" Twala; A. Van Wyk; H. Xulu; I. Van Wyk	5:58
2.	"I'm Winning (My Dear Love)"	S. Twala; H. Xulu*; I. Van Wyk	2:29
3.	"From Me To You"	S. Twala; A. Van Wyk; I. Van Wyk; R. Mitchell	4:53
4.	"Umqombothi"	Yvonne Chakachaka; Twala	5:54
5.	"I'm Suffering"	Twala	6:01
6.	"Let Me Be Free"	Twala	5:13

== Credits ==
- Co-producer – Herbert Xulu, Sello Twala
- Engineer, co-producer – Richard Mitchell
- Executive producer – Phil Hollis
- Producer, arrangement – Attie Van Wyk
