= Jane Karuku =

Kenyan businesswoman and corporate executive

- Born: Jane Karuku c. 1961 (age 64–65); Kenya
- Education: University of Nairobi (Bachelor of Science in Food Science and Technology); National University (California) (Master of Business Administration)
- Occupations: Businesswoman and Corporate Executive
- Years active: 1985 — present
- Known for: Professional expertise
- Title: Chief Executive Officer and Managing Director of East African Breweries Limited

Jane Karuku (born c. 1961) is a Kenyan businesswoman and corporate executive, who in December 2020, was appointed as the Managing Director and Chief Executive Officer of the East African Breweries Limited, headquartered in Nairobi, with subsidiaries in Kenya, Uganda, South Sudan and Tanzania. Before that, she served as the managing director of Kenya Breweries Limited, one of the Kenyan subsidiaries of EABL. She assumed her new position on 1 January 2021.

== Background and education ==
Karuku was born in Kenya circa 1961. She holds a Bachelor of Science degree in Food Science and Technology, obtained from the University of Nairobi in 1985. Her degree of Master of Business Administration, was obtained from National University (California), in La Jolla, in 1992.

== Career ==
For a period of nearly seven years, between 2002 and 2008, Karuku served as the managing director of Cadbury Schweppes, responsible for East and West Africa. She then served as the Deputy Chief Executive and Secretary General of Telkom Kenya, until 2012. After that, from 2012 until 2014, Karuku was the President of the Alliance for a Green Revolution in Africa (AGRA). In July 2015, she was appointed as the managing director of Kenya Breweries Limited, a full-time position where she served until December 2020.

In December 2020, Karuku was appointed as the new group CEO, replacing Andrew Cowan, wo was reassigned as managing director for Africa Regional Markets at Diageo, the parent conglomerate.

== Other considerations ==
Karuku served as a non-executive director of Barclays Bank of Kenya, which today is Absa Bank Kenya Plc, from 2003 until 2014. She also serves on the board of East African Breweries since June 2014. She remains a member of this board, in her new position.

Karuku is a Trustee of Precious Sisters, a non governmental organisation that empowers talented underprivileged girls through education. As of December 2020, she is the Chairperson of Kenya Vision 2030 Board.
