= Sechaba Brewery Holdings =

Investment holding company

Sechaba Brewery Holdings Limited
- Company type: Public
- Traded as: BwSE: SECHABA
- Industry: Brewing
- Headquarters: Botswana
- Key people: B. Mmualefe (chairman); J. de Kok (managing director)
- Revenue: BWP 221m (March 2016)
- Operating income: BWP 218m (March 2016)
- Net income: BWP 202m (March 2016)
- Website: http://www.sabmiller.com

Sechaba Brewery Holdings Limited is the investment holding company with 60% controlling interest in Kgalagadi Breweries Limited (KBL) and Botswana Breweries (Pty) Limited. SAB Miller holds the remaining 40% minority interest.

It was listed on the Botswana Stock exchange on 19 June 1989.

== Shareholder analysis ==
The main shareholders in SBHL are:

Sechaba Brewery Holdings stock ownership

Rank	Name of owner	Percentage ownership
1	Botswana Development Corporation Limited	25.6
2	SABMiller Africa BV	16.8
3	FNB Nominees (PTY) Ltd	9.4
4	Motor Vehicle Accident Fund	4.9
5	SCBN (PTY) Ltd	4.6
6	Other shareholders	38.7
	Total	100.00
