= Beer in Africa =

Beer in Africa, especially lager, is produced commercially in most African countries, and indigenous people also make varieties of beer. Beer is served in various locales, from neighbourhood shebeens to upscale bars. Many countries have standardized beer bottle sizes, which are cleaned and re-used, so when buying beer at a store, people often must pay a deposit on the bottle and the price of the beer. An alternative to glass-bottle beers is local beer sold in tetra-pak style paper cartons.

South Africa consumes the most beer of any African country, with an average of 60 liters per person annually.

== Indigenous beers ==
Traditional beer brewing is a common practice among Africans in rural areas. Varieties and types of beer depend on local customs and resources. Among beers brewed locally are ginger beers and honey beers.

United National Breweries, amongst others, produces Johannesburg beer, and Chibuku beer is popular throughout Southern African countries.

In South Africa and Botswana, sorghum malt is an important ingredient. Elsewhere, maize is the primary ingredient, and the beer is more commonly known as opaque beer.

== Central Africa ==
=== Cameroon ===
The most popular brands are Castel and 33 Export, and in larger cities, Beaufort, Beaufort Lite, Mützig Lager, Guinness, Guinness Foreign Extra Stout, and Guinness Smooth can be found. Local brews include palm wine in the southern part of the country and millet beer called bil-bil in the north.

=== Congo (DRC) ===
Most beers in Congo (DRC) are brewed by Heineken, with the most popular being Primus.

=== Gabon ===
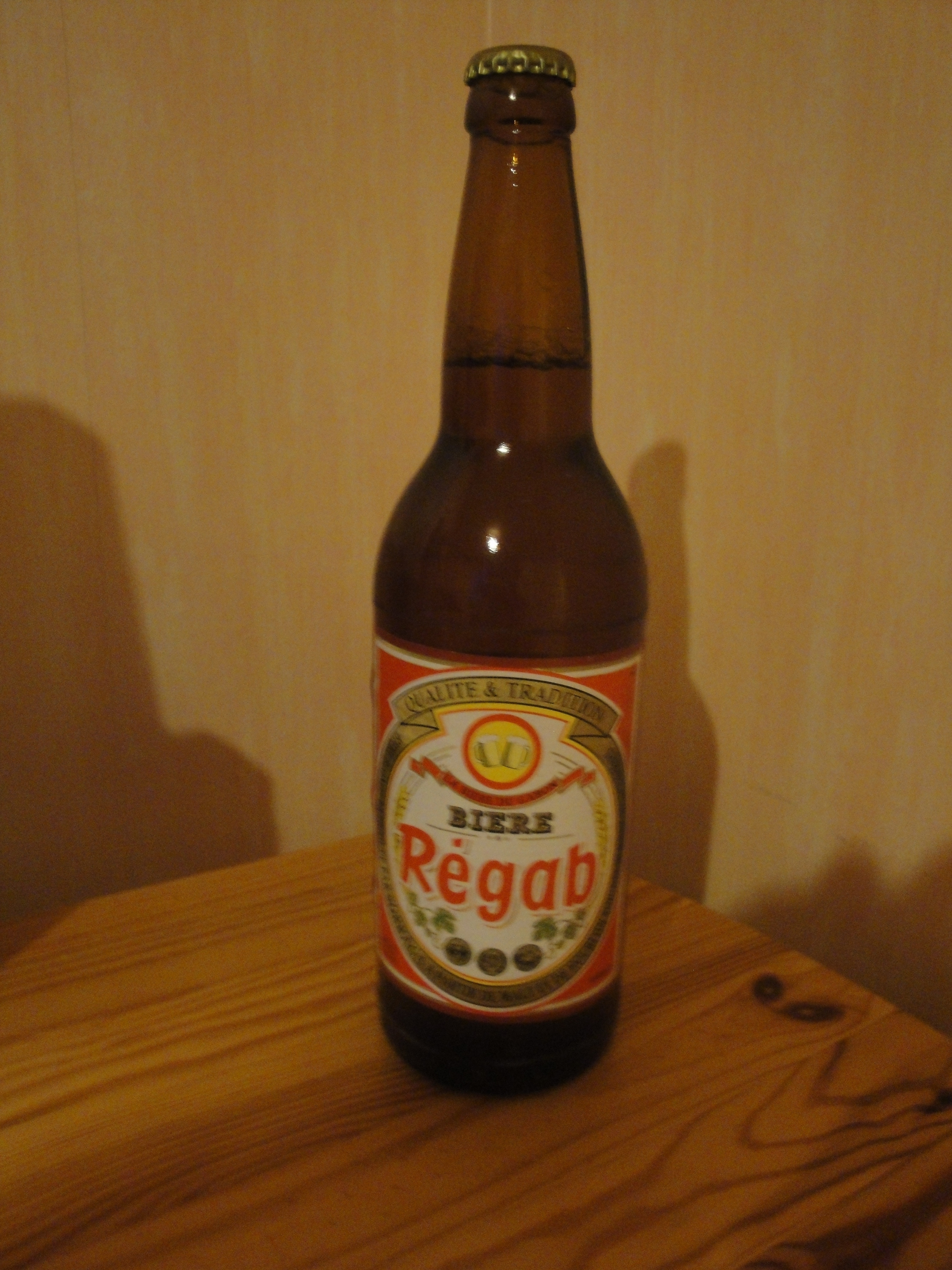
A bottle of Régab

Régab is the most widely distributed domestically brewed beer in Gabon.

== Eastern Africa ==
=== Ethiopia ===
St. George Beer

A number of beer brands are produced in Ethiopia. St. George Beer (named after the country's patron saint) is the country's oldest brewery, established in 1922. More recently, introducing foreign beer brands like Heineken has created a lot of competition in the market, increasing investment in the farming sector. This influx of capital has led the country to be more self-sufficient in such areas as malt production. Heineken's parent company acquired and rebranded many traditional Ethiopian brands including Meta, Harar, and Bedele.

=== Eritrea ===
Golden Star, brewed by the Golden Star Brewery, is the only beer made in Eritrea after the closing of Asmara Brewery, which had been brewing since the colonial era.

=== Kenya ===
Tusker, brewed by Kenya Breweries Limited, is Kenya's most popular beer. Popularly known as "Keroro" beer, Tusker is a source of Kenyan pride highlighted in the late 1990s when East African Breweries waged a marketing war against Castle Breweries, a subsidiary of international brewing giant SABMiller. In this media campaign, Castle, which had constructed a multimillion-dollar brewery in the industrial town of Thika, was depicted as foreign and uncommitted to Kenya. The prolonged marketing wars ended in 2002 when the two brewers reached a settlement in which they divided the beer market in East Africa among themselves. Castle agreed to exit Kenya, and EABL decided to leave the Tanzanian market to the SABMiller subsidiary.

=== Tanzania ===
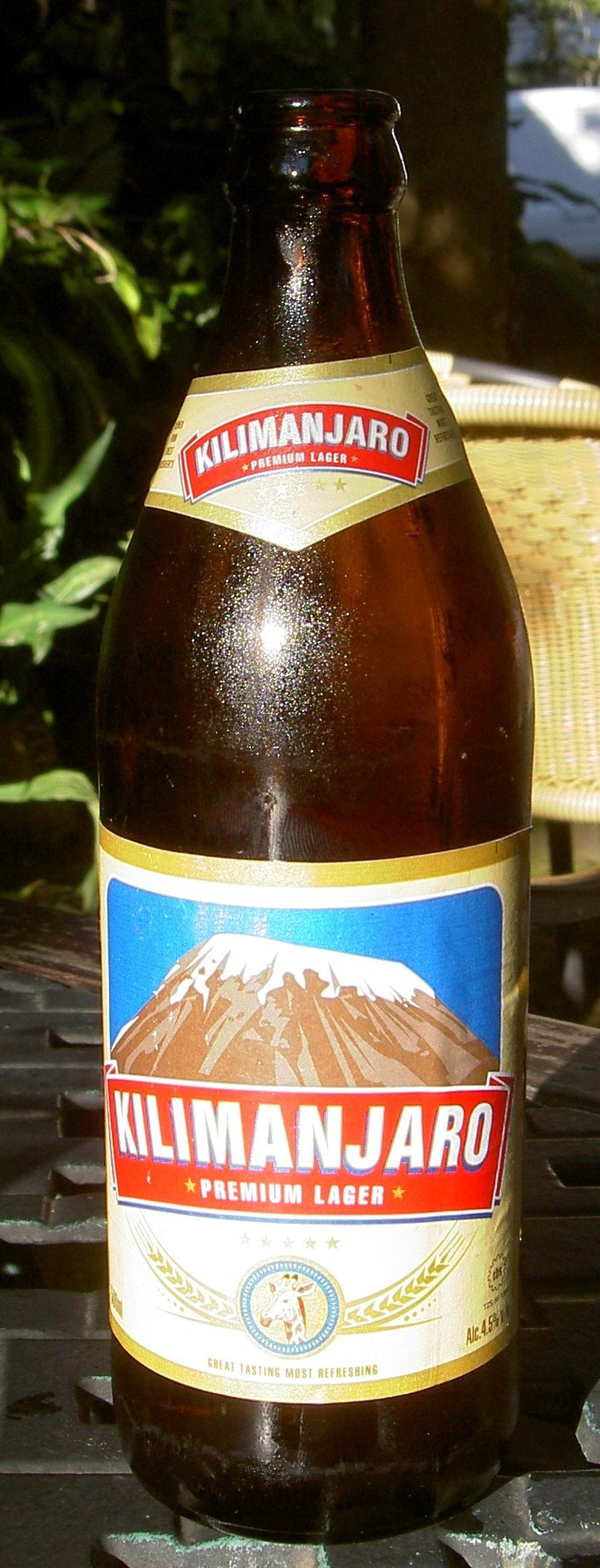
A bottle of Kilimanjaro beer

Beer (known as pombe in Swahili) is an integral part of Tanzanian society, and local brands hold a strong sense of national pride and economic value. Tanzania is the sixth-largest per-capita consumer of beer in Africa. Over 90% of beer consumption is of homemade-style brews, but bottled brands include:

- Kilimanjaro Premium Lager (4.5%)
- Serengeti Premium Lager (5.5%)
- Ndovu Premium Malt (4.8%)
- Uhuru Peak Lager (5.8%)
- Eagle
- Chibuku

=== Rwanda ===
Rwanda has Primus Beer. Another brand is Virunga. Urwagwa is a beer made from fermented banana juice and sorghum flour.

=== Uganda ===
A southern Uganda beer is Nile Special, produced in and distributed from Jinja, the source of the Nile at Lake Victoria. Club, Bell Lager, Eagle (the local beer made using sorghum), Guinness, and Tusker are others.

== Northern Africa ==
=== Egypt ===
The leading local brand is called Stella (not to be confused with the Belgian Stella Artois). Other brands on the market include Meister, Luxor and Sakara, and the non-alcoholic Birell and Desperados.

== Southern Africa ==
Chibuku Shake Shake, so-called by the need to shake the carton before drinking it, is a commercial umqombothi brewed by Chibuku and remains a popular beer in Botswana, Zimbabwe, Zambia, and Malawi. Chibuku Shake Shake is made from a mix of sorghum and maize. In Zimbabwe, it is known as "scud". It is sold in paper cartons or brown plastic containers with a wide blue lid. It is thought to be a drink for lower-class people. This thick brown millet beer costs less than a dollar and is shaken vigorously before drinking it because of its thick layer of sediment collected on the bottom of the carton. It has a robust yeast flavor that a lemony tang offsets. Standard practice is to slurp any remaining sediment at the bottom of the container.

=== Botswana ===
Kgalagadi Breweries Limited, a subsidiary of SAB Miller, produces St Louis. The traditional St Louis Special Light has a 3.5% v/v alcohol content. Due to the popularity of the St Louis brand, KBL has recently introduced an alcohol-free St Louis 24 at 0% v/v and St Louis Premium Export lager 4.5% v/v. St Louis Lager and St Louis Export have been awarded a Silver Quality Award at the coveted World Quality Selections (2012), organized by Monde Selection.

=== Madagascar ===
Three Horses beer is the national beer in Madagascar. Brasserie Star brews it. It is colloquially called "THB" (In French te-ash-be).

=== Malawi ===
Malawi has its own Carlsberg brewery. Officially opened on 14 December 1968, Carlsberg Malawi Brewery Limited (CMBL) was the first Carlsberg brewery outside Denmark. Its brands include Green, a stout lager; Elephant, a strong lager; and Kuche Kuche, Malawi's traditional beer (Mowa Wathu Wathu).

=== Mauritius ===
Phoenix Beverages (formerly Mauritius Breweries) produce a local lager called Phoenix Beer; one premium lager known as Gister (4.8%); two strong lagers - Phoenix Special Brew (6.5%) and Blue Marlin (6.0%); and a pale lager called Stella Pils. They are also licensed to brew Guinness (of the Foreign Extra Stout variety) and Warsteiner since 2003 (as of 2015, Warsteiner is no longer produced). They also brew Three Horses beer for export to Madagascar under license.

Recently, Universal Breweries Ltd has begun operating. They produce a local lager-style beer called Black Eagle and a strong lager called Black Eagle Xtra (7.0%). Universal Breweries was defunct in 2008, bought by Stag Beverages in 2009, and itself went defunct in 2014.

In 2012, Flying Dodo Brewing Company opened the first craft brewery on the island.

=== Mozambique ===
Mozambique produces two of the most-awarded beers in Africa: Laurentina Clara, a pale lager, and Laurentina Preta, a dark lager. Manica is a pale lager, and 2M (pronounced doish-emi), produced by the same brewery (CdM), is also popular. Laurentina is now exported to South Africa and the United Kingdom.

=== Namibia ===
Namibia Breweries, the country's largest brewery, offers mainly lagers and a lager Draught (Hansa) on tap that is popularly served in every Restaurant. Other popular bottled beers are Tafel Lager, Windhoek Lager, and Windhoek Light. Windhoek is the country's capital.

=== South Africa ===
Of South African beers, Castle Lager is the most famous, although South Africa produces a variety of brands that are exported. South African Breweries became the world's second-largest beer producer after acquiring Miller Breweries from USA as a wholly owned subsidiary of SABMiller.

=== Zambia ===
Zambia's leading beer is Mosi Lager, made by Zambian Breweries, named after the indigenous name for Victoria Falls (Mosi Oa Tunya). The products of South African Breweries' Castle are also found in most places in Zambia.

=== Zimbabwe ===
Zambezi is Zimbabwe's national beer, brewed by Delta Corporation on Manchester Road, Harare. It is made from malt, maize, hops, and water and is 4.7% abv. Other major beers include Bohlingers, Eagle and South African Breweries' Carling Black Label, Lion Lager, and Castle Lager.

== Western Africa ==
=== Angola ===
In Angola the leading brand is the national Cuca beer was established in 1947, while Angola was still an overseas territory of Portugal, under the name CUCA - Companhia União de Cervejas de Angola, SARL.

=== Benin ===
La Béninoise is the national beer of Benin. Locally brewed millet beer, known as tchouk, is popular in the northern regions. When beer fails, there is Sodabe, boxed wine, and plastic sachets of whiskey.

=== Burkina Faso ===
The most common beers in Burkina Faso are Brakina and So.B.Bra. Both beers are produced by the Castel Group. In 2017 the first craft brewery, Brasserie Artisanale De Ouagadougou, started to sell IPAs, porters, and other ales—some with locally grown sorghum. The second microbrewery opened in 2017 and sells imported Belgian and crafted Belgian-styled beers. There is also a small influx of beers from the Ouagadougou region, especially from Togo and Ghana.

=== Cape Verde ===
In Cape Verde, the leading brand is the national Strela beer and the Portuguese Super Bock import.

=== Gambia ===
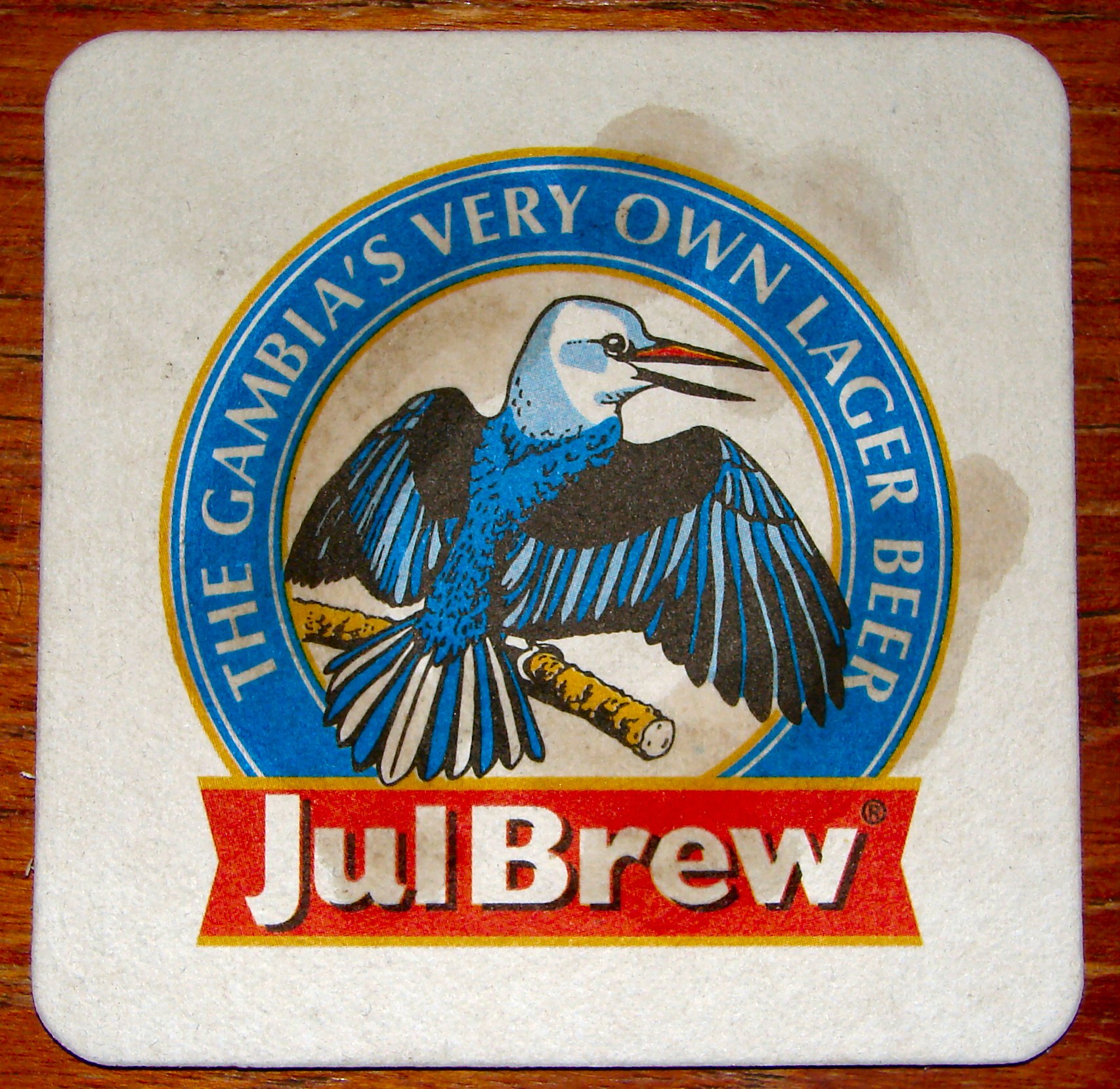
A JulBrew coaster

Gambia has Julbrew, brewed by Banjul Breweries Ltd.

=== Ghana ===
Ghana's most famous brands are Star Beer and Club Premium Lager. Ghana is home to a local craft brewery, Django Brothers, brewing international-style beers such as the Django IPA, Django Weiss, and Django Lager.

=== Guinea ===
Guiluxe, a favorite of expatriate Peace Corps volunteers, is the only known locally brewed beer in Guinea.

=== Liberia ===
Monrovia Breweries domestically brews club beer.

=== Niger ===
Niger has Biere Niger, Flag in small bottles, and Grand Flag in large bottles.

=== Nigeria ===
Nigeria produces a version of Guinness Foreign Extra Stout that uses sorghum. A ban on imports of barley malt imposed in 1990 forced brewers to find ways to produce beer with locally available sorghum and maize. The Nigerian version is distinct from other Guinness FES's found worldwide.

Nigerian Breweries brews under license Star, Gulder, Heineken, and several local beer brands, both ales and stouts. Mopa Breweries, Ltd. produces the popular One Lager.

Intafact Beverages Limited with a single brewery in Onitsha brews Hero Lager, Castle Milk Stout, and non-alcoholic beverages such as Grand Malt and Beta Malt.

International Breweries plc in Ilesa brew Trophy Lager, Trophy Black, and BETAMALT.

=== Sierra Leone ===
Star Beer is the most widely distributed domestically brewed beer by Sierra Leone Brewery Limited.

=== Togo ===
Eku Bavaria and Awooyo are two brands in Togo. Flag and Castel are also widely available.

== See also ==
- Beer and breweries by region
