= Kgalagadi Breweries Limited =

Motswana brewery

Coordinates: 24°37′52″S 25°55′08.6″E

Kgalagadi Breweries (Pty) Limited
- Trade name: KBL
- Type: Private company
- Industry: Brewing, beverage
- Predecessor: Prinz Brau Botswana
- Founded: 1970; 56 years ago
- Headquarters: Gaborone, Botswana
- Number of locations: 1 brewery, 4 sorghum breweries, 1 soft-drink plant
- Key people: Batlang Mmualefe (chairman); Johan de Kok (CEO)
- Revenue: BWP 1,74 billion
- Owner: Sechaba Brewery Holdings - 60% SABMiller - 40%
- Website: KBL on SABMiller

Kgalagadi Breweries (Pty) Limited are brewers based in Gaborone, Botswana. They produce lager beers, traditional beers, bottled water and soft drinks under license. The brewery started out as Prinz Brau, with two brands, Prinz Brau and Prinz Deluxe.

== Corporate timeline ==
- 1960s - Botswana Breweries Limited is started in Francistown to brew Chibuku traditional beer.
- 1970s - Sechaba Brewery Holdings Limited (SBHL) is set up to hold investments in the beverage sector.
- 1977 - SAB acquires management control of KBL (40% equity stake). KBL begins bottling Coca-Cola products.
- 1989 - SBHL is listed on the Botswana Stock Exchange.
- 1995 - New soft drink bottling line built in Gaborone.
- 2009 - KBL launches St Louis Export.
- 2013 - Botswana Breweries Ltd is amalgamated with KBL.

== Botswana Breweries Limited ==
Botswana Breweries has four plants in Lobatse, Gaborone, Palapye and Francistown.

The products include

- traditional opaque beer Chibuku, made from sorghum and maize
- Phafana (opaque beer)
- non-alcoholic beverage Keone Mooka Mageu

Product packs include a straight-sided screw-top one litre carton, a 750ml pack and a draught.

== Ownership ==
The shares of Kgalagadi Breweries Limited are privately held. The shareholding in the company's stock as at December 31, 2012 was as depicted in the table below:

Kgalagadi Breweries Limited stock ownership

Rank	Name of pwner	Percentage ownership
1	Sechaba Brewery Holdings	60
2	SABMiller Botswana BV	40
	Total	100.00

- By virtue of its shareholding in Kgalagadi Breweries Limited and Sechaba Brewery Holdings of 40% and 16.8% respectively, SABMiller's total direct and indirect shareholding in Kgalagadi Breweries Limited and Botswana Breweries Ltd is 50.08%. This makes both companies subsidiaries of SABMiller and associates of Sechaba Brewery Holdings.

== Alcohol levy ==
In 2008, Ian Khama proposed an alcohol levy of 70% to reduce alcoholism in Botswana. There was resistance and the levy was imposed at 30%. By November 2009, the levy created the desired effect, causing declines of 35% in lager sales volume and 14% in traditional beer sale volumes. In response to the negative statutory environment, the brewery cut costs and maximised efficiencies. Non-alcoholic brands were developed to compensate for the fall in traditional brands. In six month report (September 2013) the levy was at 45% and the decrease in alcohol brands had dropped a further 8%. New brands developed include Source bottled water and Keone Mooka Mageu.

== Brands ==
- St Louis (1989) 3.5% ABV
- St Louis Export 4.7% ABV
- Castle Lager 5% ABV
- Castle Lite 4% ABV
- Ohlsson's Lager
- Lion Lager 5% ABV
- Carling Black Label 5.5% ABV

Traditional beers (opaque beers)

- Chibuku
- Phafana

Non-alcoholic brands

- Source Water - accredited by the Botswana Bureau of Standards (BOBS)
- Bonaqua Still Water
- Keone Mooka Mageu - a traditional fermented porridge

Soft drinks

- Coca-Cola
- Coke Zero
- Fanta Orange
- Fanta Grape
- Fanta Pineapple
- Sprite
- Iron Brew
- Ginger Stoney
- Pine Nut
- Minute Maid
- Cream-Soda
- Burn
- Powerade

== Social responsibility programs ==
Kickstart is an entrepreneur development programme for 18- to 30-year-olds providing mentorship and training to over 107 young entrepreneurs. 80% of participants are still trading.

Project Tshelang (Stay alive) launched in 2001 aims to prevent new infections and provide employees and their families with awareness and counselling programs. There are currently 74 trained and active peer educators.
