= Yvonne Chaka Chaka =

South African singer-songwriter (born 1965)

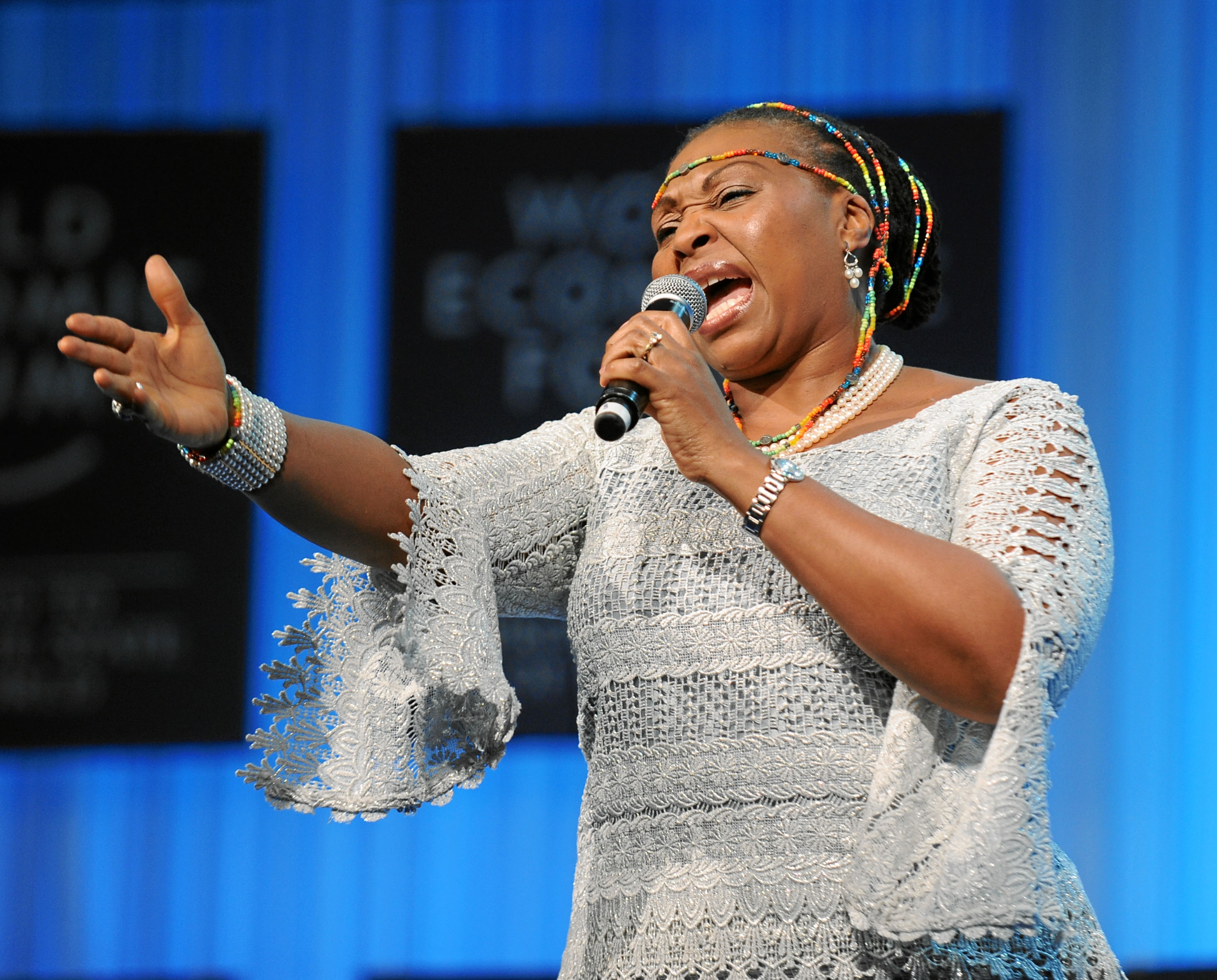
- Chaka Chaka at the World Economic Forum annual meeting in 2012

Personal details
- Born: Yvonne Ntombizodwa Machaka; 18 March 1965 (age 61) Dobsonville, Soweto, South Africa
- Children: 5
- Profession: Singer, songwriter, humanitarian, entrepreneur, teacher
- Awards: WEF Crystal Award, 8th-Most-Powerful African, Top 100 Most Influential Women in the World Global Good Award (2017 BET Awards)
- Website: www.yvonnechakachaka.co.za//

Yvonne Chaka Chaka OIS (born Yvonne Machaka on 18 March 1965) is a South African singer, songwriter, entrepreneur, humanitarian and teacher. Dubbed the "Princess of Africa" (on a 1990 tour), Chaka Chaka has been at the forefront of South African popular music for 35 years and has been popular in Cameroon, Nigeria, Zimbabwe, Zambia, Kenya, Uganda, Ghana, Gabon, Sierra Leone and Ivory Coast. Songs such as "I'm Burning Up", "Thank You Mr. DJ", "I Cry For Freedom", "Motherland" and the ever-popular "Umqombothi" ("African Beer") ensured Chaka Chaka's stardom. The song "Umqombothi" was featured in the opening scene of the 2004 movie Hotel Rwanda.

As a young performer, Chaka Chaka was the first Black child to appear on South African television in 1981. Since then, she has shared the stage with people such as Bono, Angélique Kidjo, Annie Lennox, Youssou N'Dour, the crossover group Appassionante, the classic rock band Queen and South Africans Johnny Clegg, Miriam Makeba and Hugh Masekela. She has performed for Queen Elizabeth II, US President Bill Clinton, South African President Thabo Mbeki and other world leaders.

Chaka Chaka is a champion for The Global Fund to Fight AIDS, Tuberculosis and Malaria, the United Nations MDG Envoy for Africa, and the Goodwill Ambassador for the Roll Back Malaria Partnership. She was chosen by Nelson Mandela as the first ambassador for his children's fund, and has also established her own charity, the Princess of Africa Foundation, using the name first given to her in Uganda. The Princess of Africa Foundation is a partner of the ACTION global health advocacy partnership. In 2012, she was the first African woman to receive the World Economic Forum's Crystal Award.

She teaches literacy part-time at the University of South Africa, sits on several boards of charitable organisations and NGOs, and serves on the board of the Johannesburg Tourism Company.

== Life and career ==
Chaka Chaka was born in Dobsonville in Soweto to a Swazi mother and a Pedi father Chaka Chaka had it tough growing up. Her father died when she was 11 and her mother, a domestic worker, brought up three daughters on her meagre 40-rand-a-month salary.

Chaka Chaka started singing at 19 in 1984 when Phil Hollis of Dephon Records discovered her in Johannesburg. Her début album was called I'm in Love With a DJ. Songs such as "I'm Burning Up", "I Cry for Freedom", "Sangoma", "Motherland" and the ever-popular "Umqombothi" immediately ensured Chaka Chaka's status as a star on South Africa's mbaqanga music scene.

Sangoma was released in 1987 on Mercury Records. Its track listing was "Sangoma", "Come a Little Bit Closer", "Private Lover", "Save Me", "Stimela" and "I'm Gonna Stop Loving You". Releasing hit after hit, Chaka Chaka's subsequent award-winning albums include Burning Up, Sangoma, Who's the Boss, Motherland, Be Proud to be African, Thank You Mr. DJ, Back on My Feet, Rhythm of Life, Who's Got the Power, Bombani (Tiko Rahini), Power of Afrika, Yvonne and Friends and Kwenzenjani. During her career Chaka Chaka has met many illustrious people including Nelson Mandela (singing at his 85th birthday party), the Queen and Oprah Winfrey.

"Mama Africa", Miriam Makeba, said of her "She's my baby!" and Hugh Masekela called Chaka Chaka "my mad niece". Legends Dolly Rathebe and Dorothy Masuka describe Chaka Chaka's music as "something that all should listen to".

When asked whom she admired most, Chaka Chaka said:

My mother, because she has always been there for me. My mother raised three daughters single-handedly on a domestic worker's salary. That took great courage and strength. She is my mentor and hero. When I was born in 1965 in Soweto, it was during apartheid, and those were extremely difficult times. My dad was a great musician who could never realise his dream. He died when I was 11 years old. I inherited my talent from both parents, so music has always been in my blood. When I was little I would strum an empty tin and blow into a broom stick pretending it was a microphone. I sang in church choirs. I loved singing. I am blessed that I achieved my destiny, and been able to accomplish what my father could not.

Of the numerous world leaders she has met, she says her favourite is mentor and father figure Nelson Mandela, who called her his "dear daughter". "Madiba", as he is affectionately known, recounted that it was Yvonne's music that helped sustain him and others while confined as prisoners on Robben Island. He said,

"It is what we make of what we have, not what we are given, that separates one person from another. Yvonne, you are a testament to my belief. Your generosity has benefited untold numbers of families and orphans facing the challenges of AIDS, terminal illness, abuse, poverty and illiteracy."

Chaka Chaka has four sons with her husband Tiny Mhinga. She has a degree and diploma from the University of South Africa, one in adult education, and another in local government, management and administration. She also studied speech and drama at Trinity College, London, she graduated with a bachelor's degree in 1997.

== Entrepreneurship ==
Chaka Chaka has her own music label and production company, as well as a limousine company with her husband, Dr Mandlalele (Tiny) Mhinga. In the early 2020s, she launched a range of beauty products called Princess of Africa.

== Advocacy and humanitarianism ==
Chaka Chaka is a champion for the Global Fund to Fight AIDS, TB and Malaria, the United Nations MDG Envoy for Africa, and the Goodwill Ambassador for the Roll Back Malaria Partnership. Chaka Chaka is also a board member of Information Technology Companies, Human Resource Development and Sandown Motors. She became the face of First National Bank (FNB) in 2001 and in 2006, she founded her own charity called The Princess of Africa Foundation.

The Princess of Africa Foundation is a partner of the ACTION global health advocacy partnership. In 2012, she was the first African woman to receive the World Economic Forum's Crystal Award. Recently, the launch of her documentary film, A Motherland Tour – A Journey of African Women, filmed over five years of travels around Africa, took her on a world tour to promote the grassroots successes of those engaged in the battle against HIV/AIDS, TB and malaria, supported by the Global Fund.

Chaka Chaka also serves as Ambassador for Nelson Mandela's 46664 Campaign which raises global awareness of HIV/AIDS. She has also been ambassador to the University of South Africa (UNISA), City of Johannesburg Tourism, and South Africa's Mpumalanga Province Tourism. Chaka Chaka has taught literacy in South Africa's townships, promoted the rights of women and works to protect children everywhere. She is a Trustee of Tomorrow Trust, which educates orphans and vulnerable children.

She served as an Honorary Colonel in the South African Air Force.

In 2015 she signed an open letter which the ONE Campaign had been collecting signatures for; the letter was addressed to Angela Merkel and Nkosazana Dlamini-Zuma, urging them to focus on women as they serve as the head of the G7 in Germany and the AU in South Africa respectively, which will start to set the priorities in development funding before a main UN summit in September 2015 that will establish new development goals for the generation.

She is part of the Ashinaga Kenjin-Tatsujin International Advisory Council, supporting orphaned students across Africa to access quality tertiary education.

== Discography ==
Albums

- I'm Burning Up (1986)
- Sangoma (1987)
- Thank You Mr. DJ (1987)
- I Cry For Freedom (1988)
- The Power of Afrika (1996)
- Back On My Feet (1997)
- Bombani (Tiko Rahina) (1997)
- Yvonne and Friends (2000)
- Yvonne and Friends (2001)
- Kwenzenjani (2002)
- Princess of Africa, Vol. 2 (2002)
- Celebrate Life (2006)
- Ndi Phendule

Compilations

- The Princess of Africa: The Best of Yvonne Chaka Chaka (1995)
- Princess Of Africa: The Best of Yvonne Chaka Chaka (1999)
- The Princess of Africa: The Best of Yvonne Chaka Chaka Vol. 2 (2002)

Contributing Artist

- Urban Africa: Jive Hits of the Townships (1990)
- The Rough Guide to the Music of South Africa (1998, World Music Network)
- The Winds of Change: Words and Music of a Free South Africa (2004)
- 46664 - Part 2: Long Walk to Freedom (2004)
- Tales of African Folk: Southern Africa (2005)
- Hotel Rwanda - Motion Picture Soundtrack (2005)
- The Rough Guide to the Music of South Africa Vol. 2 (2006)
- Experience South Africa (2008)
- The Rough Guide to African Disco (2013, World Music Network)
