= Nile Breweries Limited =

Brewery in Uganda

- Industry: Brewing
- Founded: 1951
- Founder: Rambhai Somabhai Patel
- Headquarters: Jinja, Uganda
- Number of locations: Jinja & Mbarara
- Area served: East African Community
- Products: Beer, water
- Production output: 2.4 million hectolitres
- Owner: AB InBev
- Website: www.nilebreweries.com

Nile Breweries Limited (NBL) is the leading beer manufacturer in Uganda.

== Location ==
The NBL's headquarters and main brewery are in the town of Njeru in Buikwe District, approximately 6 kilometres (4 mi) north-east of the central business district of Jinja, Uganda. This is approximately 77 kilometres (48 mi), by road, east of Kampala, the capital and largest city of Uganda. The coordinates of the company headquarters are 0°26'19.0"N, 33°10'47.0"E (Latitude:0.438620; Longitude:33.179720).

== Overview ==
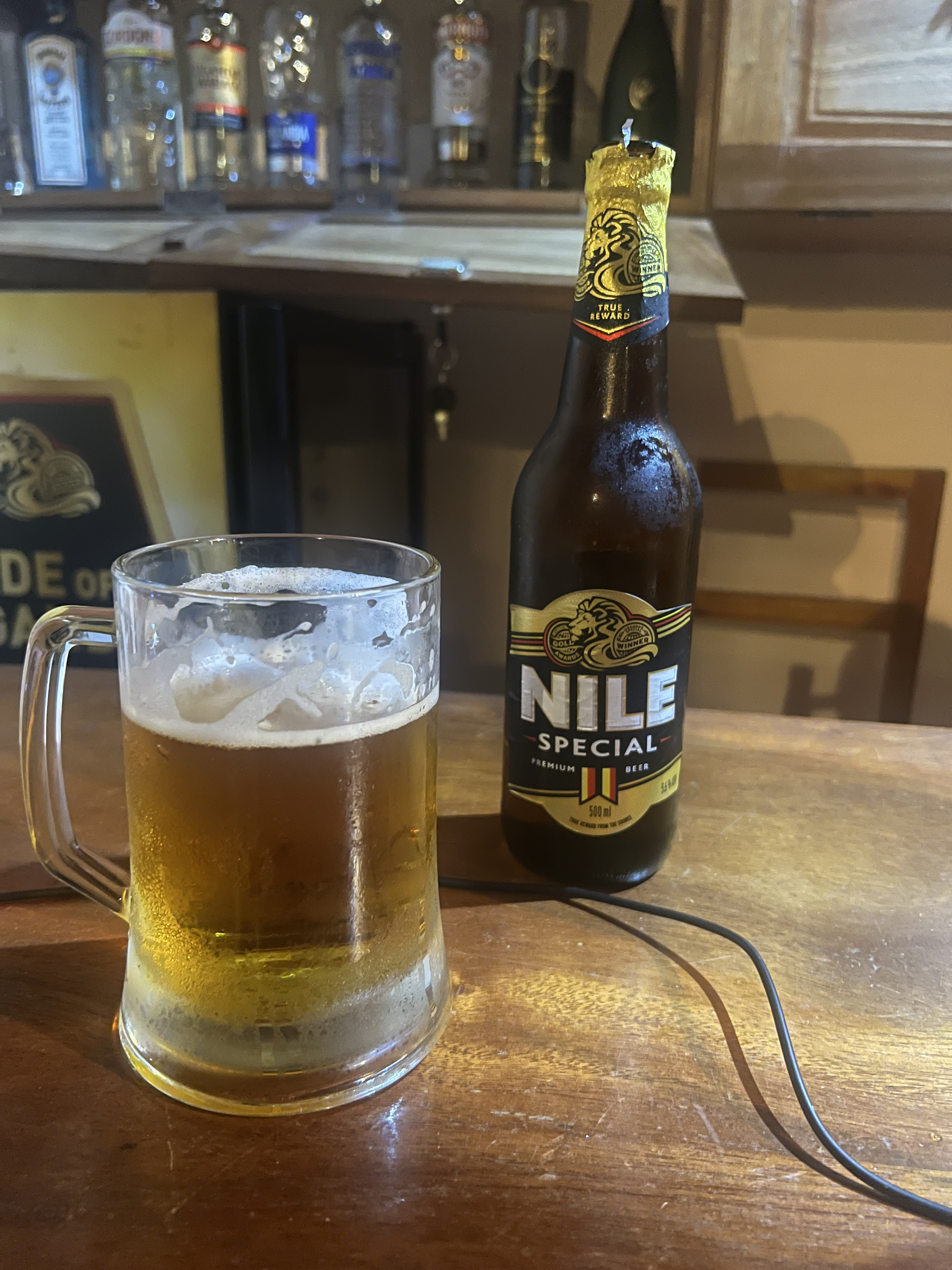
A pour of Nile Special, a popular Ugandan beer in a glass along with the bottle.

NBL had an estimated 52 percent share of the Ugandan beer market in 2013. This has since grown to 57 per cent.

Eagle Lager was launched to promote the use of locally grown sorghum to make lager beers and to reduce reliance on imported raw materials. Brand extensions now include an Eagle Extra, Eagle Poa and Eagle Dark.

== History ==
NBL started in 1951 as a single brewery in Jinja. The brewery was nationalised in 1972 by President Idi Amin. In 1997, South African Breweries bought a 40 percent share in the brewery, raising this to full ownership in July 2001. The company is now a proud part of the ABInBev family after the successful completion of the business combination with SABMiller plc in 2016.

== Operations ==
In October 2013, NBL opened a new brewery in Mbarara, about 250 kilometres (155 mi), south-west of Kampala. Built at a cost of US$90.6 million (about UGX:235 billion), the brewery was projected to produce 5.5 million crates of beers annually. The new brewery uses sorghum, maize, and barley, which are grown mostly by farmers in the region. The products of this brewery are marketed locally and exported to South Sudan and the Democratic Republic of the Congo.

A maltings plant with a 120-ton piece size was built on the brewery site at Jinja in 2011 to support a local barley growing initiative and to supply barley malt to the brewery. Involved in this construction was Excel Construction Limited, formed in 1992 as a joint venture company between the Madhvani Group and Gomba Construction Company Ltd.

== Brands ==
As of 2013, Nile Breweries had ten locally produced beer brands (Nile Special, Nile Gold, Club Pilsner, Castle Lite, Castle Milk Stout, Eagle Lager, Eagle Extra, Eagle Dark, Eagle Poa and Chairman's ESB), one locally produced traditional African beer (Chibuku), two imported lagers (Castle Lager and Grolsch).

As of 2014, the flagship Nile Special brand was being exported to Kenya.
