= Chibuku =

Sorghum beer based on Umqombothi African beers

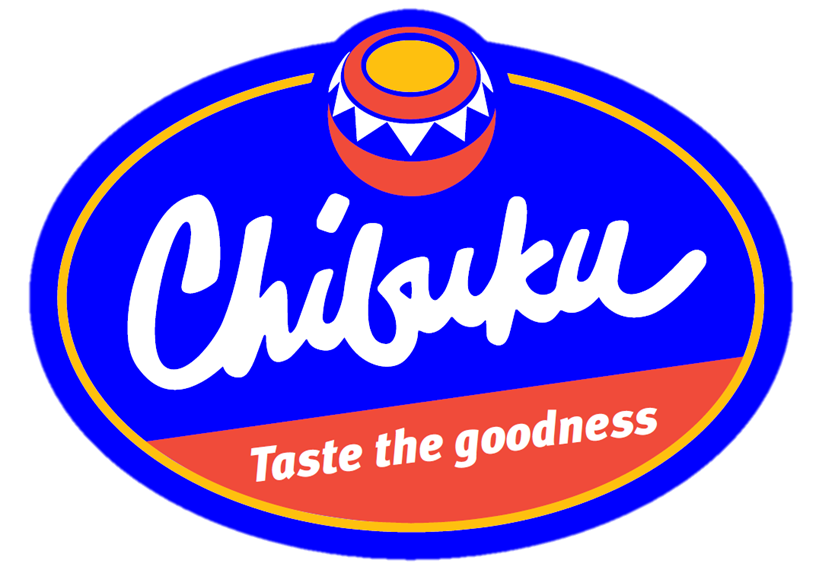
- Type: Opaque Beer
- Manufacturer: Delta Beverages
- Origin: Zimbabwe
- Alcohol by volume: 3.3% to 4.5%
- Colour: Tan-pink to white
- Ingredients: Sorghum, Maize
- Variants: Chibuku Super

Chibuku is a commercial sorghum beer based on the traditional Umqombothi homemade African beers; the main grains used are malted sorghum and maize but may also contain millet.

== The brand name ==
"Chibuku" comes from Max Heinrich's habit of recording all consumers' comments and process changes in a book. Chibuku is an adaptation of the local word for "book" - "Chi" is the prefix meaning "big", "buk" = "book", and the terminal "u" is because most African nouns tend to end in a euphonic vowel. The shake-shake comes from the ritual of shaking up the beer before taking the first sip. The beer contains starch, germ, and yeast (all typically removed in lagers and ales), and since the solids settle to the bottom of the carton, it needs to be shaken before sipping.

== Alcohol content ==
The alcohol content in a fresh Chibuku is relatively low, starting at about 0.5% ABV on day one. Still, as fermentation continues in the carton, the longer it is kept before drinking, the stronger it gets. It may achieve 4% ABV before the shelf-life expires after between 4 and 6 days after packaging.

== The brand ==
Chibuku is a pan-African brand of opaque sorghum beer made by various African brewers.

Chibuku was first brewed in Zambia, on the Copperbelt, in the town known as Kitwe. Part of the reason for the success of the brand is the commercial brewing process with systems to ensure a consistent quality product that is safe for consumers. Chibuku comes in 2 packs: Chibuku "Scud," a non-carbonated drink and Chibuku "Super," a carbonated sorghum beer.

Chibuku is often the choice of less affluent consumers who can't afford bottled beer, and this may still be the case for many of the consumers in Zambia, Malawi and Botswana. However there are also consumers in the emerging middle class who enjoy the beer as a preference, because of the taste and for the health connotations.

It is now brewed in some of Zambia's neighboring countries and

== Production ==
Chibuku is now brewed across Africa by various brewers.

- Botswana it is brewed by Botswana Breweries subsidiary of Kgalagadi Breweries Limited
- Ghana by Accra Brewing Limited
- Malawi by Chibuku Products Ltd
- Mozambique by Cervejas de Mocambique
- South Africa by United National Breweries (SA)
- Tanzania by Tanzania Breweries Ltd
- Uganda by Nile Breweries Limited
- Zimbabwe by Delta Beverages.
- Zambia by National Breweries Zambia

== See also ==
- Umqombothi
- Commercial sorghum
