= Kikuyu people =

Ethnic group in Kenya

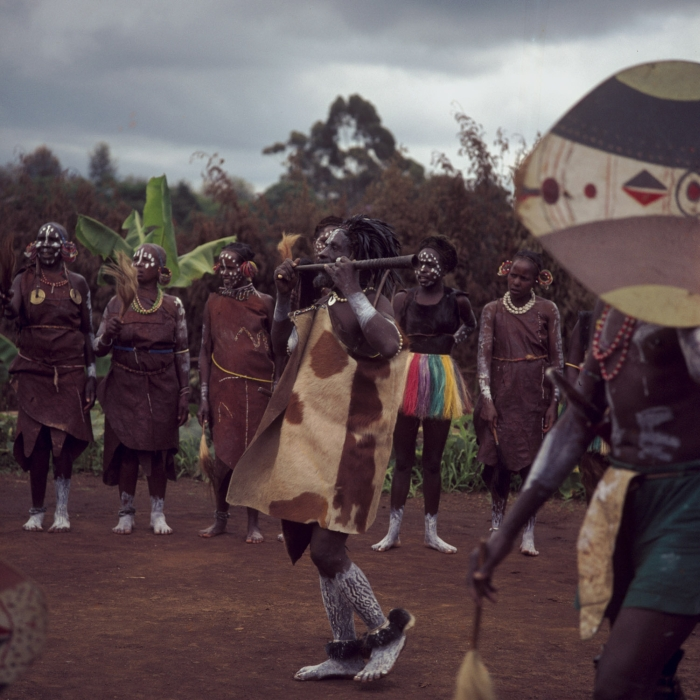
- A Kikuyu dance group performing for tourists at the 'Village Dancers Hotel' in Nyeri. Their dance costumes and props are a mixture of tradition and fantasy. New designs and materials include a brightly colored 'reed' skirt, and a wooden shield (replacing traditional leather). This performance may have little to do with genuine traditional folk dances.

Total population
- approx. 8.1 Million

Regions with significant populations
- Kenya: 8,148,668

Languages
- Gĩkũyũ, Kiswahili and English

Religion
- Christianity, Agikuyu Religion, Islam, Judaism, and Traditional African Religion

- Person: MũGĩkũyũ
- People: AGĩkũyũ
- Language: Gĩkũyũ
- Country: Bũrũrĩ Wa Gĩkũyũ

The Kikuyu (also Agĩkũyũ/ Gĩkũyũ) are a Bantu ethnic group native to Central Kenya. They are native to Central Kenya and were part of the Thagicu group that settled around Mount Kenya and primarily inhabit the fertile central highlands of Kenya. Traditionally, the Kikuyu community was organized into nine clans Anjirũ, Ambũi, Agacikũ, and Aceera, among others. At a population of 8,148,668 as of the 2019 census, they account for ~17.13% of the total population of Kenya, making them the country's largest ethnic group.

The term Kikuyu is the Swahili borrowing of the autonym Gĩkũyũ (Gikuyu pronunciation: [ɣèkòjóꜜ]).

== History ==
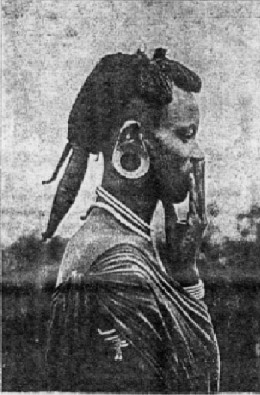
Kikuyu man from 1910

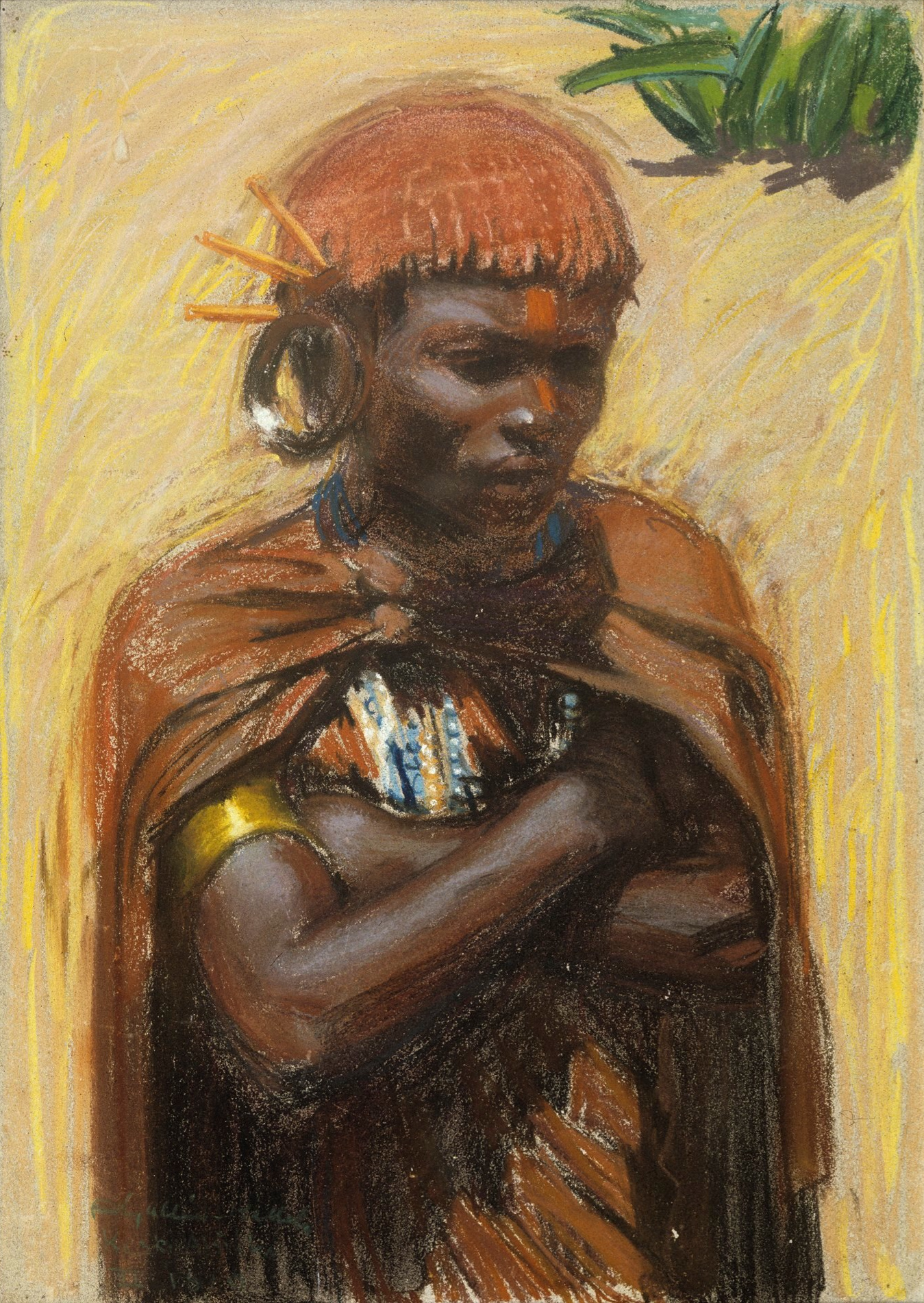
Portrait of Kenosua by Gallen-Kallela, 1909–1910

=== Origin ===
The Kikuyu belong to the Northeastern Bantu branch. The exact place that they migrated from after the initial Bantu expansion is uncertain. Their ancestors were part of the wider Bantu migration which originated in the region of West-Central Africa (modern-day Cameroon/Nigeria) and passed through the Congo Basin, a major dispersal corridor. While linguistically Bantu, these groups show significant genetic and cultural interaction with neighbouring Nilotic and Cushitic populations. Studies have observed Nilotic ancestry in Kikuyu individuals ranging from approximately 20-25% with Cushitic ancestry reaching approximately 32-36%. This is largely due to their geographic location in the central highlands, surrounded by diverse ethnic clusters.

Their ancestors were part of a broader group known as the Thagicu first reaching the northern slopes of Mount Kenya around the 3rd century CE. By the 13th century, they had established a cultural core in the highlands around Murang'a. A major southward migration into present-day Kiambu followed during the 18th and 19th centuries, a process characterized by land acquisition and intermarriage with indigenous hunter-gatherer groups. According to oral traditions, their neighbours included the Maasai people who lived both in Kajiado to the South and Laikipia to the north as well as Borana who occasionally grazed close to the northern part of the Mount Kenya region alongside the Meru and Embu to the East .

Their language is most closely related to that of the Embu and Mbeere. Geographically, they are concentrated in the vicinity of Mount Kenya.

=== Before 1888 ===
==== The nation and its pursuits ====
Before the establishment of East Africa Protectorate in 1895, the Agĩkũyũ preserved geographic and political power from almost all external influence for many generation as they had never been subdued. Before the arrival of the British, Arabs involved in slave trading and their caravans passed at the southern edges of the Agĩkũyũ nation. Slavery as an institution did not exist amongst the Agĩkũyũ, nor did they make raids for the capture of slaves. The Arabs who tried to venture into Agĩkũyũ land met instant death. Relying on a combination of land purchases, blood-brotherhood (partnerships), intermarriage with other people, and their adoption and absorption, the Agĩkũyũ were in a constant state of territorial expansion. Economically, the Agĩkũyũ were great farmers and shrewd businesspeople. Besides farming and business, the Agĩkũyũ were involved in small scale industries with professions such as bridge building, string making, wire drawing, and iron chain making. The Agĩkũyũ have a great sense of justice (kĩhooto).

==== Social and political life ====
The Kikuyu community was divided into nine clans. These nine clans are the Anjirũ, Agacikũ, Ambũi, Angũi aka Aithiegeni, Angechi aka Aithĩrandũ, Aacera, Ambura aka Aakĩũrũ or Eethaga, Airimũ aka Agathiigia, Angarĩ aka Aithekahuno and Aicakamũyũ and all clans and families emanate from them perpetually, through patriarchy. Each clan traced its lineage to a single female ancestor and a daughter of Mumbi. The clans were not restricted to any particular geographical area, they lived side by side. Some clans had a recognized leader, others did not. However, in either case, real political power was exercised by the ruling council of elders for each clan. Each clan then forwarded the leader of its council to the apex council of elders for the whole community. The overall council of elders representing all the clans was then led by a headman or the nation's spokesman.

==== Spirituality and religion ====
The Gĩkũyũ were – and still are – Animists believing in the veneration of ancestors, spiritual entities, a distant High God whom they refer to as Ngai, and other supernatural beings. A complex animistic system including the beliefs in spirits and higher and lower gods, sometimes including a supreme being, as well as the veneration of the dead, use of magic, and traditional African medicine, is broadly shared with other African religions.

===== Concept of Ngai =====
All of the Gĩkũyũ, Embu, and Kamba use the name Ngai to refer to a supremer being, the distant creation force who represents the head of the spiritual world and represents the first ancestor and creator of Gĩkũyũ society. Ngai was also known as Mũrungu by the Meru and Embu tribes, or Mũlungu. The title Mwathani or Mwathi (the greatest ruler) comes from the word gwatha meaning to rule or reign with authority, was and is still used. All sacrifices to Ngai were performed under a sycamore tree (Mũkũyũ) and if one was not available, a fig tree (Mũgumo) would be used. The olive tree (Mũtamaiyũ) was a sacred tree for women.

===== Mount Kenya and religion =====
In Gĩkũyũ tradition, Ngai (also known as Mwene-Nyaga) is identified as the creator and the source of all natural resources and provides all the resources necessary for life: land, rain, plants, and animals. While described as invisible, Ngai is believed to manifest through celestial bodies and natural phenomena such as thunder, lightning, rainbows, comets and meteors, and in the great fig trees (Mugumo). The Mugumo (fig tree) is regarded as a sacred site for worship and sacrifice, specifically marking Mũkũrwe Wa Nyagathanga, the site where oral legend maintains the ancestors Gĩkũyũ and Mũmbi first settled. Ngai has human characteristics, and although some say that he lives in the sky or in the clouds, Gĩkũyũ lore also says that Ngai comes to earth from time to time to inspect it, bestow blessings, and mete out punishment. In Gĩkũyũ tradition, Mount Kenya is a site of central spiritual significance and divine manifestation.

Historical and linguistic evidence also indicates that some parts of Mount Kenya region have been home to various communities over millennia, including Nilotic, Cushitic, and ancient hunter-gatherer groups—such as the Ogiek and those referred to in oral history as the Gumba. The Gĩkũyũ, a Bantu-speaking group, established their presence in the central highlands through a long-term process of migration, interaction, and cultural exchange with these established populations. Today, the mountain remains a shared sacred landmark for several ethnic groups, each maintaining distinct cultural and religious associations with the site.

===== Philosophy of the traditional Kikuyu religion =====
The cardinal points in this Traditional Gĩkũyũ Religion Philosophy were squarely based on the general Bantu peoples thought as follows:

1. Veneration of ancestors
2. Veneration of Nature and Nature deities
3. Veneration of lower and higher gods
4. Veneration of a distant High God or creation force
5. Belief in an Afterlife with the possibility of Reincarnation

Traditional Gĩkũyũ ontology is rooted in the belief that the universe is interconnected through a spiritual "vital force." In this worldview, all physical existence possesses an inner spiritual energy, leading to a philosophical framework where "being" is synonymous with "force." This energy is attributed to the creator deity Ngai (or Mũgai), who is viewed as both the source of the universe and an immanent presence within it. Gĩkũyũ tradition maintains a spiritual hierarchy based on the proximity of this force to the creator: the first parents are held in the highest veneration—often as deities—followed by ancestral spirits, and finally the community elders, who mediate sacrifices and rites. This lineage creates a spiritual chain connecting the living, particularly children, to Ngai through their ancestors. Furthermore, the Gĩkũyũ believe in the cyclical nature of life, where the spirits of the departed may be reborn into the world, a concept reinforced through specific naming ceremonies and rites of passage.

==== Political structures and generational change ====
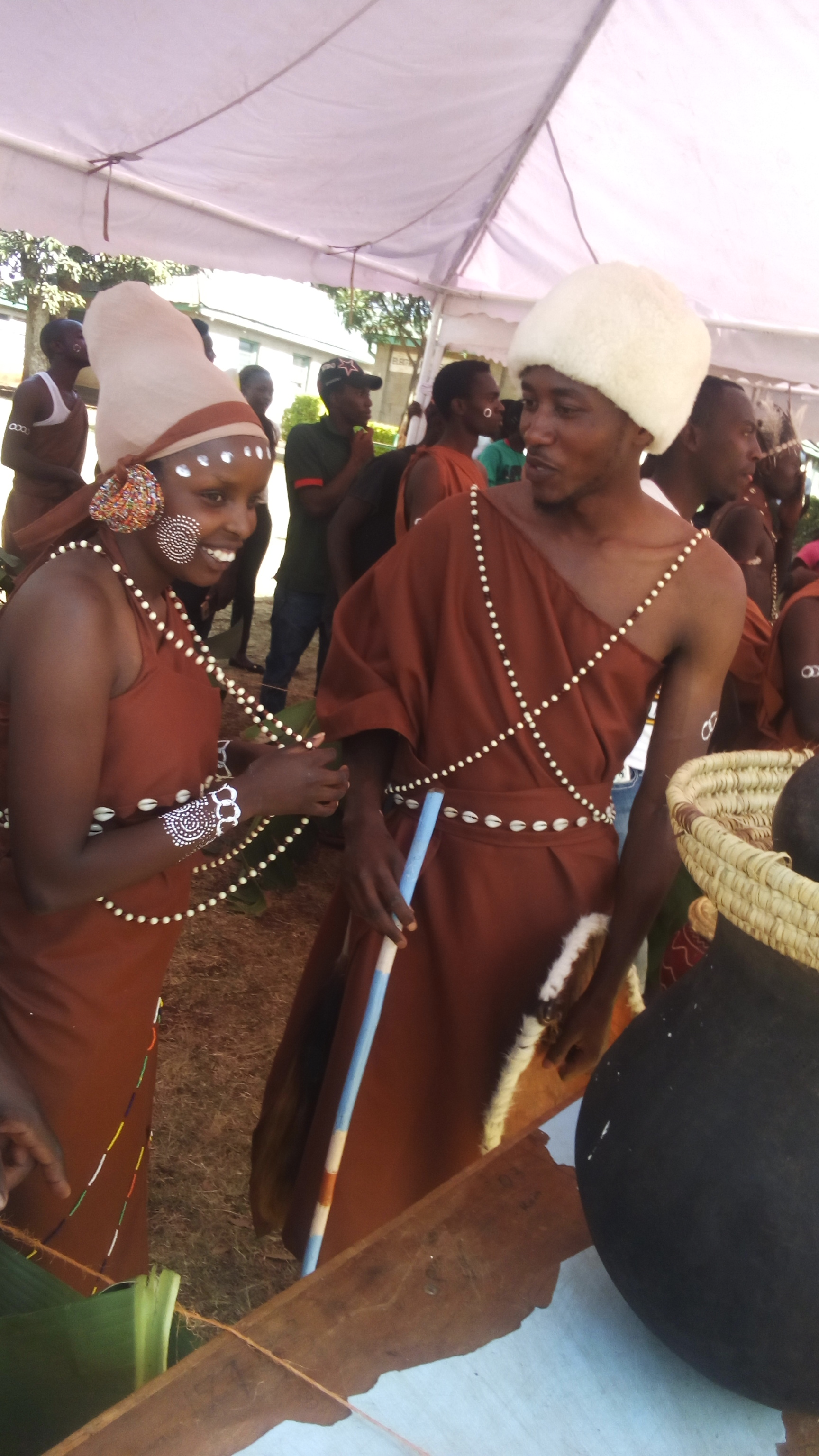
A Gikuyu man and his wife in 2020 in Kenya

The Agĩkũyũ had four seasons and two harvests in one year.

1. Mbura ya njahĩ (the season of big rain) from March to July;
2. Magetha ma njahĩ (njahĩ being Lablab purpureus) (the season of the black bean harvest) between July and early October;
3. Mbura ya Mwere (short rain season) from October to January;
4. Magetha ma Mwere (the season of harvesting) milletà;
5. Mbura ya Kĩmera.

In Gĩkũyũ society, time was historically documented through the system of initiation sets (riika). Each group undergoing circumcision was assigned a unique name, which served as a record of contemporary events, such as the appearance of diseases like smallpox or syphilis. According to historian Godfrey Mũriũki, these individual sets were organized into larger "regiment" or "army" sets. The timing of these initiations followed specific regional cycles:

- In Metumi (Mũrang'a): Initiation of boys occurred annually for nine years, followed by a mũhingo (closure) period of four and a half years where no initiations took place.
- In Gaki (Nyeri): The system was inverted, with annual initiations occurring for four years, followed by a nine-year mũhingo period.

While initiation for girls occurred annually, their specific group names are less documented in academic literature; however, Mũriũki identifies several late 19th-century sets from Metumi and Kabete, including Rũharo (1894) and Kagica (1896).

These regiments combined to form a ruling generation (itwĩka), which lasted an average of 35 years. While the names of individual initiation sets varied across Gĩkũyũ land, the ruling generations remained uniform, providing a standardized chronological framework for Gĩkũyũ history.

- Manjiri 1512 – 1546 ± 55
- Mamba 1547 – 1581 ± 50
- Tene 1582 – 1616 ± 45
- Aagu 1617 – 1651 ± 40
- Manduti 1652 – 1686 ± 35
- Cuma 1687 – 1721 ± 30
- Ciira 1722 – 1756 ± 25
- Mathathi 1757 – 1791 ± 20
- Ndemi 1792 – 1826 ± 15
- Iregi 1827 – 1861 ± 10
- Maina 1862 – 1897 ± 5
- Mwangi 1898?

Mathew Njoroge Kabetũ's list reads, Tene, Kĩyĩ, Aagu, Ciĩra, Mathathi, Ndemi, Iregi, Maina (Ngotho), Mwangi. Gakaara wa Wanjaũ's list reads Tene, Nema Thĩ, Kariraũ, Aagu, Tiru, Cuma, Ciira, Ndemi, Mathathi, Iregi, Maina, Mwangi, Irũngũ, Mwangi wa Mandũti. The last two generations came after 1900. One of the earliest recorded lists by McGregor reads (list taken from a history of unchanged) Manjiri, Mandũti, Chiera, Masai, Mathathi, Ndemi, Iregi, Maina, Mwangi, Mũirũngũ. According to Hobley (a historian) each initiation generation, riika, extended over two years. The ruling generation at the arrival of the Europeans was called Maina. It is said that Maina handed over to Mwangi in 1898. Hobley asserts that the following sets were grouped under Maina – Kĩnũthia, Karanja, Njũgũna, Kĩnyanjui, Gathuru and Ng'ang'a. Professor Mũriũki however puts these sets much earlier, namely Karanja and Kĩnũthia belong to the Ciira ruling generation which ruled from the year 1722 to 1756, give or take 25 years, according to Mũriũki. Njũgũna, Kĩnyanjui, Ng'ang'a belong to the Mathathi ruling generation that ruled from 1757 to 1791, give or take 20 years, according to Mũriũki.

Professor Mũriũki's list must be given precedence in this area as he conducted extensive research in this area starting 1969, and had the benefit of all earlier literature on the subject as well as doing extensive field work in the areas of Gaki (Nyeri), Metumi (Mũrang'a) and Kabete (Kĩambu). On top of the ruling generations, he also gives names of the regiments or army sets from 1659 [within a margin of error] and the names of annual initiation sets beginning 1864. The list from Metumi (Mũrang'a) is most complete and differentiated.

Mũriũki's is also the most systematically defined list so far. Most of the most popular male names in Gĩkũyũ land were names of riikas (initiation sets). Here is Mũriũki's list of the names of regiment sets in Metumi (Mũrang'a): Kiariĩ (1665–1673), Cege (1678–1678), Kamau (1704–1712), Kĩmani (1717–1725), Karanja (1730–1738), Kĩnũthia (1743–1751), Njũgũna (1756–1764), Kĩnyanjui (1769–1777), Ng'ang'a (1781–1789), Njoroge (1794–1802), Wainaina (1807–1815), Kang'ethe (1820–1828), Mbũgua (1859–1867), Njenga or Mbĩra Itimũ (1872–1880), Mũtũng'ũ or Mbũrũ (1885–1893).

H.E. Lambert, who dealt with the riikas extensively, has the following list of regiment sets from Gichũgũ and Ndia. (It should be remembered that this names were unlike ruling generations not uniform in Gĩkũyũ land. It should also be noted that Ndia and Gachũgũ followed a system where initiation took place every annually for four years and then a period of nine calendar years followed where no initiation of boys took place. This period was referred to as mũhingo.) Karanja (1759–1762), Kĩnũthia (1772–1775), Ndũrĩrĩ (1785–1788), Mũgacho (1798–1801), Njoroge (1811–1814), Kang'ethe (1824–1827), Gitaũ (1837–1840), Manyaki (1850–1853), Kiambũthi (1863–1866), Watuke (1876–1879), Ngũgĩ (1889–1892), Wakanene (1902–1905).

The remarkable thing in this list in comparison to the Metumi one is how some of the same names are used, if a bit offset. Ndia and Gachũgũ are extremely far from Metumi. Gaki on the other hand, as far as my geographical understanding of Gĩkũyũ land is concerned should be much closer to Metumi, yet virtually no names of regiment sets are shared. It should however be noted that Gaki had a strong connection to the Maasai living nearby.

The ruling generation names of Maina and Mwangi are also very popular male Gĩkũyũ names. The theory is also that Waciira is also derived from ciira (case), which is also a very popular masculine name among the Agĩkũyũ. This would call into question, when it was exactly that children started being named after the parents of one's parents. Had that system, of naming one's children after one's parents been there from the beginning, there would be very few male names in circulation. This is however not the case, as there are very many Gĩkũyũ male names. One theory is that the female names are much less, with the names of the full-nine daughters of Mũmbi being most prevalent.

Gakaara wa Wanjaũ supports this view when he writes in his book, Mĩhĩrĩga ya Aagĩkũyũ,

Hingo ĩyo ciana cia arũme ciatuagwo marĩĩtwa ma mariika ta Watene, Cuma, Iregi kana Ciira. Nao airĩĩtu magatuuo marĩĩtwa ma mĩhĩrĩga tauria hagwetetwo nah au kabere, o nginya hingo iria maundu maatabariirwo thuuthaini ati ciana ituagwo aciari a mwanake na a muirĩĩtu.

Freely translated it means "In those days the male children were given the names of the riika (initiation set) like Watene, Cuma, Iregi, or Ciira. Girls were on the other hand named after the clans that were named earlier until such a time as it was decided to name the children after the parents of the man and the woman." From this statement it is not clear whether the girls were named ad hoc after any clan, no matter what clan the parents belonged to. Naming them after the specific clan that the parents belonged to would have severely restricted naming options.

This would strangely mean that the female names are the oldest in Gĩkũyũ land, further confirming its matrilineal descent. As far as male names are concerned, there is of course the chicken and the egg question, of when a name specifically appeared but some names are tied to events that happened during the initiation. For example, Wainaina refers to those who shivered during circumcision. Kũinaina (to shake or to shiver).

There was a very important ceremony known as Ituĩka in which the old guard would hand over the reins of government to the next generation. This was to avoid dictatorship. Kenyatta related how once, in the land of the Agĩkũyũ, there ruled a despotic King called Gĩkũyũ, grandson of the elder daughter (Wanjirũ according to Leakey) of the original Gĩkũyũ of Gĩkũyũ and Mũmbi fame. After he was deposed, it was decided that the government should be democratic, which is how the Ituĩka came to be. This legend of course calls into question exactly when it was that the matrilineal rule set in. The last Ituĩka ceremony, where the riika of Maina handed over power to the Mwangi generation, took place in 1898–9. The next one was supposed to be held in 1925–1928 [Kenyatta] but was thwarted by the colonial imperialist government and one by one Gĩkũyũ institutions crumbled.

==== Collapse of traditional political structure ====
The ruling generations, the rĩĩka system can be traced back to the year 1500 AD or thereabouts. These were:

- Manjiri 1512 to 1546
- Mamba 1547 to 1581
- Tene 1582 to 1616
- Agu 1617 to 1652
- Manduti 1652 to 1686
- Cuma 1687 to 1721
- Ciira 1722 to 1756
- Mathathi 1757 to 1791
- Ndemi 1792 to 1826
- Iregi 1827 to 1861
- Maina 1862 to 1897
- Mwangi 1898

The last Ituĩka ceremony where the rĩĩka of Maina handed over power to the Mwangi generation, took place in 1898–1899. The next one was supposed to be held in 1925–1928 but was thwarted by the colonial government. The traditional symbols of power among the Agikuyu nation is the Muthĩgi (Stick) which signifies power to lead and the Itimũ (Spear) signifying power to call people to war.

=== 1888–1945 ===
The traditional way of life of Agikuyu was disrupted when they came into contact with the British around 1888. British explorers had visited the region prior the "Scramble for Africa", and now various individuals moved to establish a colony in the region, noting the abundant and fertile farmland. Although initially non-hostile, relationships between the Agikuyu and the Europeans soon turned violent: Waiyaki Wa Hinga, a leader of the southern Agikuyu, who ruled Dagoretti who had signed a treaty with Frederick Lugard of the British East Africa Company (BEAC) burned down Lugard's fort in 1890. Waiyaki was captured two years later by the company and buried alive in revenge.

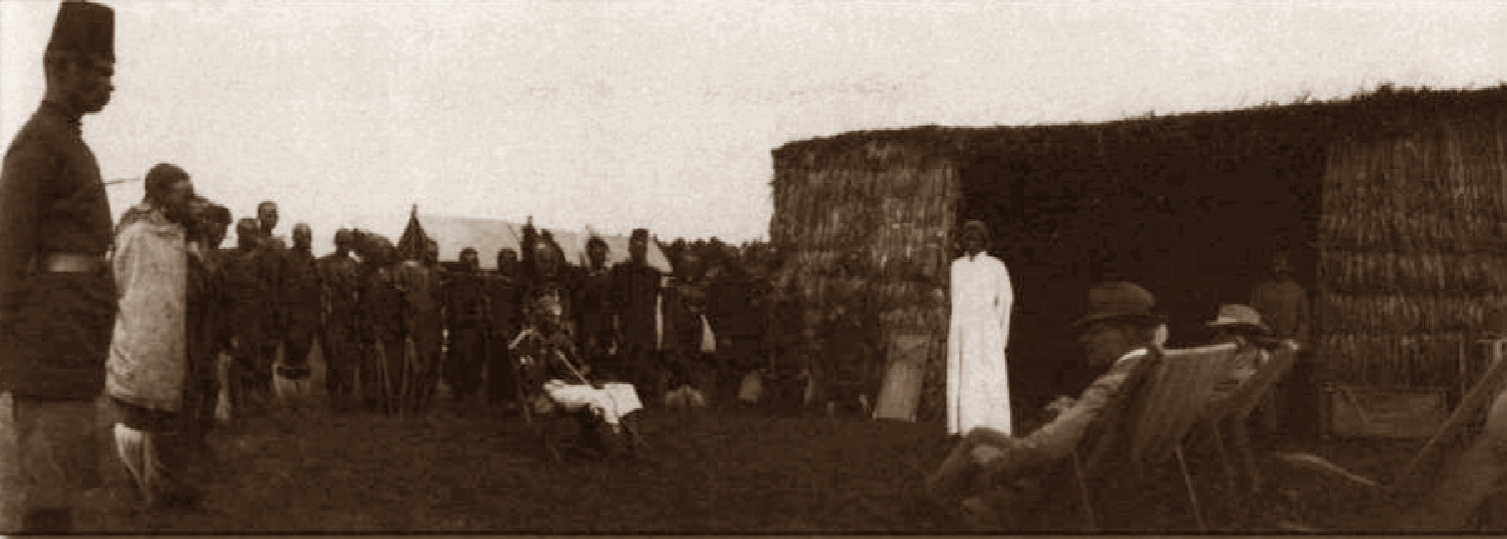
Kikuyu chief Wanbugu (seated center) in talks with the High Commissioner of the East Africa Protectorate c. 1910

Following severe financial difficulties of the British East Africa Company, the British government on 1 July 1895 established direct Crown rule through the East African Protectorate, subsequently opening in 1902 the fertile highlands to European emigrants. The Agikuyu, upset at the waves of emigrants, enforced a policy of killing any of their own that collaborated with the colonial government. When disputes with white settlers and the Agikuyu became violent (usually over land issues), the settlers would employ Maasai tribesmen together with some colonial troops to carry out their fighting for them. The Maasai had historically negative relations with the Agikuyu, and thus were willing to take up arms against them. The various conflicts between the settlers and the Agikuyu often resulted in defeat for the latter, thanks to their inferior weaponry. The Agikuyu, having been unsuccessful in their conflicts with the European settlers and the colonial government, turned to political means as a method of resolving their grievances.

Kenya served as a base for the British in the First World War as part of their effort to capture the German colonies to the south, which were initially frustrated. At the outbreak of war in August 1914, the governors of British East Africa (as the Protectorate was generally known) and German East Africa agreed to a truce in an attempt to keep the young colonies out of direct hostilities. However, Lt. Col Paul von Lettow-Vorbeck took command of the German military forces, determined to tie down as many British resources as possible. Completely cut off from Germany, von Lettow conducted an effective guerrilla warfare campaign, living off the land, capturing British supplies, and remaining undefeated. He eventually surrendered in Zambia eleven days after the Armistice was signed in 1918. To chase von Lettow-Vorbeck, the British deployed Indian Army troops from India and then needed large numbers of porters to overcome the formidable logistics of transporting supplies far into the interior by foot. The Carrier Corps was formed and ultimately mobilised over 400,000 Africans, contributing to their long-term politicisation.

The experiences gained by Africans in the war, coupled with the creation of the white-dominated Kenya Crown Colony, gave rise to considerable political activity in the 1920s which culminated in Archdeacon Owen's "Piny Owacho" (Voice of the People) movement and the "Young Kikuyu Association" (renamed the "East African Association") started in 1921 by Harry Thuku (1895–1970), which gave a sense of nationalism to many Kikuyu and advocated civil disobedience. Thuku's campaign against the colonial government was short-lived. He was exiled to Kismayu the following year, and it was not until 1924 that the Kikuyu Central Association (KCA) was formed to carry on with Thuku's campaign. From 1924, the Kikuyu Central Association (KCA), with Jomo Kenyatta as its Secretary General focused on unifying the Kikuyu into one geographic polity, but its project was undermined by controversies over ritual tribute, land allocation, the ban on female circumcision, and support for Thuku. The KCA sent Kenyatta to England in 1924 and again in 1931 to air their grievances against the colonial government and its policies.

By the 1930s, approximately 30,000 white settlers lived in Agikuyu country and gained a political voice because of their contribution to the market economy. The area was already home to over a million members of the Kikuyu nation, most of whom had been pushed off their land by the encroaching European settlers, and lived as itinerant farmers. To protect their interests, the settlers banned the production of coffee, introduced a hut tax, and landless workers were granted less and less land in exchange for their labour. A massive exodus to the cities ensued as their ability to provide a living from the land dwindled.

In the Second World War (1939–45) Kenya became an important military base. For the Agikuyu soldiers who took part in the war as part of the King's African Rifles (KAR), the war stimulated African nationalism and shattered their conceptions of Europeans. Meanwhile, on the political front, in 1944 Thuku founded and was first chairman of the multi-ethnic Kenya African Study Union (KASU).

=== 1945–1963 ===
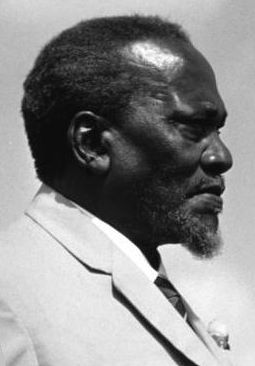
First President of Kenya Jomo Kenyatta

In 1946 KASU became the Kenya African Union (KAU). It was a nationalist organisation that demanded access to white-owned land. KAU acted as a constituency association for the first black member of Kenya's legislative council, Eliud Mathu, who had been nominated in 1944 by the governor after consulting with the local Bantu/Nilotic elite. The KAU remained dominated by the Kikuyu ethnic group. In 1947 Jomo Kenyatta, the former president of the moderate Kikuyu Central Association, became president of the more aggressive KAU to demand a greater political voice for the native inhabitants. The failure of the KAU to attain any significant reforms or redress of grievances from the colonial authorities shifted the political initiative to younger and more militant figures within the African trade union movement, among the squatters on the settler estates in the Rift Valley and in KAU branches in Nairobi and the Kikuyu districts of central province.

By 1952, under Field Marshal Dedan Kimathi, the Kenya Land and Freedom Army (Mau Mau) launched an all-out revolt against the colonial government, the settlers and their Kenyan allies. By this time, the Mau Mau were fighting for complete independence of Kenya. The war is considered by some the gravest crisis of Britain's African colonies The capture of rebel leader Dedan Kimathi on 21 October 1956 signalled the ultimate defeat of the Mau Mau Uprising, and essentially ended the military campaign although the state of emergency would last until 1959. The conflict arguably set the stage for Kenyan independence in December 1963.

=== 1963–present ===
Following Kenya's independence from British colonial rule in 1963 and the subsequent establishment of the Republic, the Gĩkũyũ became a prominent ethnic group within the modern Kenyan state.

== Culture ==
=== Language ===
Gĩkũyũs speak the Gĩkũyũ language as their native tongue, which is a member of the Bantu language family. Additionally, many speak Swahili and English as lingua franca, the two official languages of Kenya.

The Gĩkũyũ are closely related to some Bantu communities due to intermarriages prior to colonization. These communities are the Embu, Meru, and Akamba people who also live around Mt. Kenya. Members of the Gĩkũyũ family from the greater Kiambu (commonly referred to as the Kabete) and Nyeri counties are closely related to the Maasai people also due to intermarriage prior to colonization. The Gĩkũyũ people between Thika and Mbeere are closely related to the Kamba people as part of the Central Bantu migration from the Congo Basin region of Central Africa. As a result, the Gĩkũyũ people that retain much of the original Gĩkũyũ heritage reside around Kirinyaga and Murang'a regions of Kenya. Murang'a county is considered by many to be the cradle of the Gĩkũyũ people.

=== Literature ===
Until 1888, the Agikuyu literature was purely expressed in folklore. Famous stories include The Maiden Who Was Sacrificed By Her Kin, The Lost Sister, The Four Young Warriors, The Girl who Cut the Hair of the N'jenge, and many more.

When the European missionaries arrived in the Agikuyu country in 1888, they learned the Kikuyu language and started writing it using a modified Roman alphabet. The Kikuyu responded strongly to missionaries and European education. They had greater access to education and opportunities for involvement in the new money economy and political changes in their country. As a consequence, there are notable Kikuyu literature icons such as Ngũgĩ wa Thiong'o and Meja Mwangi. Ngũgĩ wa Thiong'o's literary works include Caitaani mũtharaba-Inĩ (1981), Matigari (1986) and Murogi wa Kagogo (2006), which is the largest known Kikuyu-language novel, having been translated into more than thirty languages.

=== Music ===
Traditional Kikuyu music has existed for generations up to 1888, when colonialism disrupted their life. Before 1888 and well into the 1920s, Kikuyu music included Kibaata, Nduumo and Muthunguci. Cultural loss increased as urbanization and modernization impacted on indigenous knowledge, including the ability to play the mũtũrĩrũ – an oblique bark flute. Today, music and dance are strong components of Kikuyu culture. There is a vigorous Kikuyu recording industry, for both secular and gospel music, in their pentatonic scale and western music styles such as "Mathwiti Maigi Ngai!".

=== Cinema ===
Kikuyu cinema and film production are a very recent phenomenon among the Agikuyu. They have become popular only in the 21st century. In the 20th century, most of the Agikuyu consumed cinema and film produced in the west. Popular Kikuyu film productions include comedies such as Machang'i series and Kihenjo series. Recently, Kenyan television channels have increased greatly and there are channels that broadcast programs in the Kikuyu language.

=== Cuisine ===
Typical Agĩkũyũ food includes Yams, sweet potatoes, Gītheri (maize and beans, after corn was introduced to Africa), Mūkimo (mashed green peas and potatoes), Kīmitū (mashed beans and potatoes), Irio (mashed dry beans, corn and potatoes), Mūtura (sausage made using goat intestines, meat and blood), Ūcūrū (fermented porridge made from flour of corn, millet or sorghum) roast goat, beef, chicken and cooked green vegetables such as collards, spinach and carrots.

=== Present-day religious affiliation ===
Although Gĩkũyũs historically adhered to indigenous faiths, most are Christians today, of varying denominations, as well as various syncretic forms of Christianity. A minority of the Kikuyu practice Islam, notably through Arab, Indian and Persian missionaries since trade with the rest of East Africa.

A small group of Kĩkũyũ, numbering about 60 people in 2015, practice Judaism in the town of Kusuku. While they practice a normative form of Judaism (similar to Conservative Judaism), they are not a recognized part of any larger Jewish group.

=== Religious and cultural discord ===
In April 2018, the Presbyterian Church of East Africa made a resolution to prohibit its members from the Kikuyu cultural rite known as Mburi cia Kiama and this triggered disturbances among devotees in the region of Mount Kenya. The Mburi cia Kiama entails the slaughtering of goats and advising men on how to become respected elders. When this process is over, they join different kiamas (groups). It is in these groups that they are given advice on issues like marriage, the Kikuyu culture and community responsibilities. Members of the church were given the ultimatum to renounce the cultural practice or to leave the church's fold.

=== Marriage ===
Engaged Kikuyu couples must first participate in a dowry and pre-marriage custom called Ruracio (natively written as Rũracio). The traditional ceremony includes negotiating the bride price and the fiancé identifying and selecting his fiancée from a group of disguised women.

=== Sexuality ===
In pre-colonial Kikuyu society, male children talked freely about sexuality with their parents, who taught them about various sexual taboos. Masturbation before initiation (passage beyond puberty) was considered "right and proper", but was supposed to be abandoned after initiation. Boys up to ages 14 or 15 were allowed to practice mutual masturbation or have sexual intercourse with girls, afterwords it was forbidden for fear of sexual abuse of younger girls. Many boys built thingira, or men's huts, inviting other girls and boys to play sexually before initiation. Incomplete sex play, or ngwiko, was practised after initiation.

Girl children were taught that masturbation was wrong, while formalised sex instruction was given to girls during initiation. Sexual intercourse was part of the initiation process for both boys and girls. Girls also got rid of their "intiation dirt" by having sex with immature/uninitiated boys, after the intiation period.

== List of notable Agikũyũ and people of Gĩkũyũ descent ==
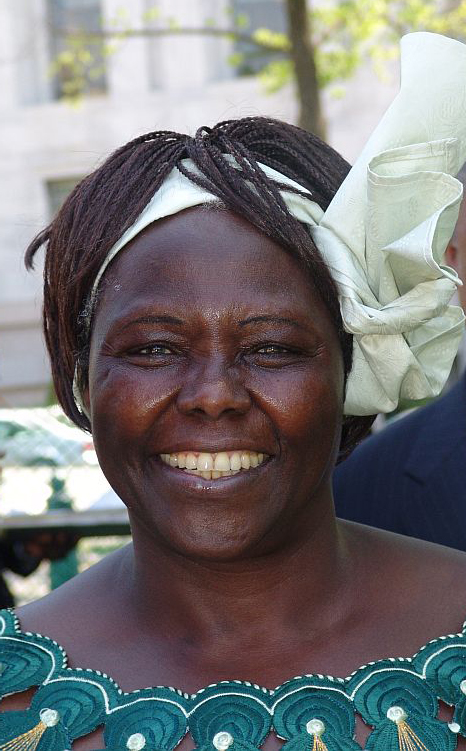
Nobel Peace Prize Winner Professor Wangari Maathai

=== Activism, authorship, academics and science ===
- Wangari Maathai, Nobel Laureate, first African woman and first environmentalist to receive the Nobel Peace Prize. First Kenyan woman to earn a Ph.D.
- Professor Stephen Kiama University of Nairobi Vice Chancellor 2020 - to date
- Ngũgĩ wa Thiong'o, Gikuyu-language author, father of author and professor Mũkoma wa Ngũgĩ
- Wanjiku Kabira, literature professor and gender rights activist
- Maina wa Kinyatti, historian and one of the foremost researchers on the Mau Mau
- Micere Githae Mugo, author, activist, literary critic and professor of literature at Syracuse University
- Wanjiru Kihoro, economist, feminist and political activist
- Njoki Wainaina, founder and first executive director of the African Women's Development and Communication Network (FEMNET)
- Wangui wa Goro, academic and social critic
- Joseph Maina Mungai, pioneer medical researcher in East Africa
- Ng'endo Mwangi, Kenya's first woman physician. The Mwangi Cultural Center at the Smith College in Massachusetts is named in her honor
- Carole Wamuyu Wainaina, Assistant Secretary-General for Human Resources Management at the United Nations
- Helen Gichohi, ecologist and President of the African Wildlife Foundation
- Olive Mugenda, first woman to head a public university in the African Great Lakes region
- Florence Wambugu, plant pathologist and virologist
- Thumbi Ndung'u, HIV/AIDS researcher and the first to clone HIV subtype C. Recipient of the Howard Hughes Medical Institute's International Early Career Scientist award
- Dorothy Wanja Nyingi, ichthyologist and recipient of the Ordre des Palmes académiques (Order of Academic Palms)
- Kimani Maruge, oldest person in the world to start primary school after enrolling in first grade aged 84
- David Muchoki Kanja, the first Assistant Secretary-General for the Office of Internal Oversight Services at the United Nations
- Muthoni Wanyeki, political scientist and human rights activist
- Simon Gikandi, English professor at Princeton University
- Gibson Kamau Kuria, lawyer and recipient of the Robert F. Kennedy Human Rights Award
- Paul Muite, lawyer, politician, multiparty activist and former presidential candidate
- Judy Thongori, lawyer and women's rights activist
- Maina Kiai, lawyer, human rights activist and United Nations Special Rapporteur on the rights to freedom of peaceful assembly and of association
- Michael Ndurumo, deaf educator and the third deaf person from Africa to obtain a Ph.D.
- Ngugi wa Mirii, playwright
- Koigi wa Wamwere, author, politician and human rights activist
- Meja Mwangi, author
- Rebeka Njau, author and playwright. Her one-act play The Scar (1965), which condemns female genital mutilation, is considered the first play written by a Kenyan woman.
- Boniface Mwangi, photojournalist and sociopolitical activist
- Ann Njogu, human rights and constitutional reform activist
- John Githongo, anti-corruption activist
- Gitura Mwaura, author, poet

=== Arts and media ===
- Wangechi Mutu, artist and sculptor
- Ingrid Mwangi, Kenyan-German artist
- Wanuri Kahiu, film director
- Wahome Mutahi, humorist popularly known as Whispers after satirical column he wrote
- Jeff Koinange, Emmy Award-winning journalist
- Julie Gichuru, news anchor and entrepreneur
- Liza Mũcherũ-Wisner, a semi-finalist in The Apprentice Season 10
- Edi Gathegi, stage, film and television actor
- Tom Morello, Grammy Award-winning guitarist, son of Ngethe Njoroge
- Eric Wainana, musician
- Janet Mbugua, news anchor
- David Mathenge, musician popularly known as "Nameless"
- Stella Mwangi, Kenyan-Norwegian musician known by the stage name STL. Represented Norway in Eurovision Song Contest 2011
- Wahu, musician
- Avril, musician and actress
- Amani, musician
- Brenda Wairimu, actress and model
- Jaguar, musician
- Joseph Kamaru, musician
- Daniel Kamau Mwai "DK", musician
- Foi Wambui, actress
- Queen Jane, musician
- Abbas Kubaff, hip hop artist
- Wangechi, rapper
- Victoria Kimani, musician and actress
- Patricia Kihoro, musician, actress and radio personality
- Size 8, musician and actress (mother: Esther Njeri Munyali (Kikuyu), father: Samuel Kirui Munyali (Ugandan from Mbale))
- Mustafa Olpak, Writer, Turkish Human rights activist descended from Kikuyu slaves in Crete

=== Business and economics ===
- Patrick Njoroge, the ninth Governor of the Central Bank of Kenya and has been in office since June 19, 2015.
- Peter Ndegwa, current CEO of Safaricom PLC. the largest network service provider in East Africa.
- Njuguna Ndung'u, economics professor and former Governor of the Central Bank of Kenya
- Samuel Kamau Macharia, founder and chairman of Royal Media Services, the largest private radio and television network in Eastern Africa
- Philip Ndegwa, entrepreneur, internationally respected economist and former Governor of the Central Bank of Kenya
- Peter Munga, founder and chairman of Equity Group Holdings Limited, Eastern Africa's second largest bank by customers after C.B.E.
- James Mwangi, group CEO and largest individual shareholder at Equity Group Holdings Limited
- Eunice Njambi Mathu, founder and editor-in-chief of Parents Africa Magazine
- Nelson Muguku Njoroge, entrepreneur
- Pius Ngugi Mbugua, entrepreneur and owner of the Kenya Nut Company, one of the world's largest macadamia nut exporters
- Chris Kirubi, industrialist and largest individual shareholder at Centum Investment Company Limited, the largest listed private equity firm in East Africa
- Jane Wanjiru Michuki, lawyer and investor
- Duncan Nderitu Ndegwa, former Governor of the Central Bank of Kenya
- Betty Muthoni Gikonyo, co-founder and group CEO at Karen Hospital
- Simon Gicharu, founder of Mount Kenya University, East and Central Africa's largest private university
- Tabitha Karanja, Current Nakuru Senator, founder and CEO of Keroche Breweries, Kenya's second-largest brewery
- Gerishon Kamau Kirima, real estate magnate
- Eddah Waceke Gachukia, educationist, entrepreneur and co-founder of Riara Group of Schools
- Esther Muthoni Passaris, businesswoman and politician
- Wanjiku Mugane, businesswoman and investment banker. Co-founder of First Africa Group which was later bought by Standard Chartered
- Dorcas Muthoni, an inductee to the Internet Hall of Fame
- Benson Wairegi, group CEO at Britam Holdings plc
- John Gachora, group CEO at NIC Bank Group
- Wilfred Kiboro, chairman of the board of directors at Nation Media Group, East Africa's largest media house. Former group CEO
- Mugo Kibati, group CEO of Sanlam Kenya Plc and chairman of Lake Turkana Wind Power
- Joseph Mucheru, former Google Sub-Saharan Africa Lead and current Cabinet Secretary for ICT in Kenya

=== Politics, military and resistance ===
- Rigathi Gachagua former deputy President of Kenya
- Ndindi Nyoro, Current Kiharu MP
- John Kiarie Waweru, Current Dagoretti South MP.
- Alice Wahome, Current CS for Water, Sanitation and irrigation.
- Irungu Kang'ata, Current Murang'a Governor.
- Susan Kihika, Current Nakuru County Governor.
- Johnson Gicheru, former Chief Justice of Kenya
- Stanley Munga Githunguri, politician and businessman
- Waiyaki wa Hinga, 19th century leader
- Waruhiu Itote also known as General China. Mau Mau resistance leader
- Bildad Kaggia, freedom-fighter and politician. Member of the Mau Mau Central Committee and the Kapenguria Six
- Mutahi Kagwe, politician
- Julius Waweru Karangi, retired General and former Chief of the Kenya Defence Forces
- Josephat Karanja, former Vice-president
- Godfrey Gitahi Kariuki, politician
- Josiah Mwangi Kariuki, businessman and socialist politician
- Muthui Kariuki, former spokesman for the Government of Kenya
- Martha Wangari Karua, politician and former presidential candidate
- Lucy Muringo Gichuhi, first person of Black African descent to be elected to the Australian Parliament
- Kung'u Karumba, freedom-fighter and member of the Kapenguria Six
- Njenga Karume, politician and businessman
- Peter Kenneth, politician, businessman and former presidential candidate
- Jomo Kenyatta, first President of Kenya, father of Uhuru Kenyatta
- Margaret Kenyatta, fourth First Lady of Kenya, wife of Uhuru Kenyatta
- Uhuru Kenyatta, fourth President of Kenya, former Deputy Prime Minister
- Ngina Kenyatta (Mama Ngina), former First Lady, wife of Jomo Kenyatta, mother of Uhuru Kenyatta
- Lucy Kibaki, former First Lady, wife of Mwai Kibaki
- Mwai Kibaki, third President of Kenya
- Dedan Kimathi, Mau Mau resistance leader
- Mbiyu Koinange, former Minister of State, brother-in-law of Jomo Kenyatta, first Kenyan holder of a master's degree
- Moses Kuria, CS of Trade.
- Arthur Magugu, politician
- Wangu wa Makeri, female chief leader
- Eliud Mathu, first African member of the Kenyan Legislative Council (LegCo)
- Kenneth Matiba, businessman, politician, multiparty activist and former presidential candidate
- John Njoroge Michuki, politician and businessman
- Githu Muigai, Former Attorney General
- Njoroge Mungai, politician and businessman. Personal doctor and first cousin to Jomo Kenyatta
- Chris Murungaru, politician
- John Michael Njenga Mututho, politician and anti-alcohol abuse campaigner.
- Njoki Susanna Ndung'u, Judge of the Supreme Court of Kenya
- Charles Njonjo, former Attorney General and Minister for Constitutional Affairs
- Wambui Otieno, freedom fighter and the principal protagonist in landmark burial case
- Charles Rubia, former member of parliament and multiparty political activist
- George Saitoti, former Vice-president
- Harry Thuku, freedom-fighter and Independence Hero
- Anne Waiguru, Current Kirinyaga County Governor.
- Gakaara wa Wanjaũ, freedom fighter, author and historian

=== Religion ===
- Caesar Gatimu, former Roman Catholic Bishop of Nyeri
- Mary Getui, Christian Theologian
- Peter Kimani Ndung'u, Bishop of the Roman Catholic Diocese of Embu
- Mugo wa Kibiru, 19th century traditional healer and seer
- Teresa Wacera Kìragū, Catholic Theologian
- Nicodemus Kirima, Bishop of the Diocese of Nyeri
- Manasses Kuria, second African Anglican Archbishop.
- John Njenga, Archbishop of the Roman Catholic Church
- Judy Mbugua, chair of the Pan African Christian Women Alliance (PACWA)
- Dr. David Gitari, third Archbishop and Primate of the Anglican Church of Kenya
- Margaret Wanjiru, Evangelical Bishop
- Archbishop Anthony Muheria, Roman Catholic Archbishop in charge of the Catholic Archdiocese of Nyeri
- Paul Kariuki Njiru - Bishop of the Roman Catholic Diocese of Wote

=== Sports ===
Gikuyu have also been in sports, taking part in multiple fetes. GEMA United Football Club was founded to unite communities from the Gikuyu, Embu, and Meru ethnic groups, and is believed to have fostered local football talent in earlier decades. In athletics, figures such as Catherine Ndereba are recognized internationally; Ndereba is among the world's top female marathoners, with multiple major wins to her credit. John Ngũgĩ the athletics ace, cross country dominance in the 1980s made him one of Kenya's most celebrated runners in that discipline. Olympic legend and first Kenyan to win Olympic marathon gold medalist Samuel Wanjiru, whose marathon gold at Beijing 2008 stunned the world, it have inspired a new generation of runners. Margaret Nyairera has, brought further glory to Kenyan athletics as a world-class 800m runner, winning medals on the international stage. Douglas Wakĩhũrĩ made history as becoming the first Kenyan to win the marathon gold at the World Championships in 1987, setting a precedent for future marathoners. Kenya international Stephene Warũrũ is recognized in local football circlesin local league clubs and Kenya harambe stars.

Agikuyu sports personalities;

- Samuel Wanjiru, first Kenyan to win the Olympic gold medal in the marathon, 2008 Beijing Olympic Marathon Champion, 2009 London and New York Marathon Champion, 2009 Rotterdam Half Marathon champion
- John Ngugi, World Cross Country Champion four consecutive titles between 1986 and 1989 and five titles overall. 1988 Olympic Champion 5000 metres
- Catherine Ndereba, four-time Boston Marathon Champion, Olympic marathon silver medalist in 2004 and 2008.
- Henry Wanyoike, Paralympics Gold medalist over 5,000 meters, holder of various marathon and half marathon records
- Douglas Wakiihuri, 1987 World Championships in Athletics Marathon Champion, 1988 Olympic Marathon silver medalist, 1990 London and New York Marathon Champion
- Joseph Gikonyo, 100 and 200 metres sprints gold medalist at 1990 African Championships.
- Boniface Tumuti, 400 metres hurdles gold medalist at the 2016 African Championships, silver medalist at the 2016 Olympics.
- QueenArrow, esports player, first woman in East Africa to be signed by a professional esports organisation
- Cliff Nyakeya, footballer who is an attacking midfielder/winger for Egyptian club ZED FC and the Kenya national team
- Linton Maina, is a German professional footballer who plays as an attacking midfielder for 2. Bundesliga club 1. FC Köln.

== Sources ==
- Boyes, John. How I Became King of the Wa-Kikuyu (PDF). Nairobi: W. Boyd.
- Hobley, Charles William (1922). Bantu Beliefs and Magic: With particular reference to the Kikuyu and Kamba tribes of Kenya colony; together with some reflections on East Africa after the war. London: H. F. & G. Witherby.
- Kabetũ, Mathew Njoroge (1966). Kikuyu: Customs and Tradition of the Kikuyu People. Nairobi: East African Literature Bureau.
- Kenyatta, Jomo (1938). Facing Mount Kenya: The Tribal Life of the Gikuyu. London: Secker and Warburg.
- Lambert, Harold E. (1956). Kikuyu Social and Political Institutions. London: Oxford University Press.
- Mbiti, John (1990). African Religions and Philosophy (2nd ed.). Oxford: Heinemann. ISBN 978-0-435-89591-4.
- Muriuki, Godfrey (1974). A History of the Kikuyu, 1500-1900. Nairobi: Oxford University Press.
- Routledge, William Scoresby; Routledge, Katherine Pease (1910). With a Prehistoric People: The Akikûyu of British East Africa, Being some account of the method of life and mode of thought found existent amongst a nation on its first contact with European civilisation. London: Edward Arnold.
- Tempels, Placide (1959). Bantu Philosophy. Paris: Présence africaine.
- Wanjau, Gakaara wa (1967). Mihiriga ya Agikuyu. Nairobi: Equatorial Publishers.
