= List of Kenyan entrepreneurs =

List of notable kenyan entrepreneurs

This is a list of notable Kenyan business executives.

For other Kenyans, see List of Kenyans.

For the richest Kenyans in annualized ranking by Forbes, see List of Kenyans by net worth.

To be included in this list, the named persons must have existing articles written about them on Wikipedia and are known for business. This list of famous or popular business people in Kenya is incomplete. You can help by adding more names to it.

- Atul Shah. Founder and largest shareholder Nakumatt Supermarkets.
- Awadh Saleh Sherman
- Bhimji Depar Shah. Investor. Worth about $700 million. He is a businessman, industrialist and entrepreneur. He is also the founder and current Chairman of BIDCO Group of Companies, a Kenya-based, family-owned manufacturing conglomerate with businesses in 13 African countries. He is listed as one of the wealthiest people in Kenya.
- Benson Wairegi, Group CEO at British-American Investments Company
- Betty Muthoni Gikonyo, Co-Founder and Group CEO at Karen Hospital.
- Chris Kirubi. Largest shareholder of Centum. as of March 2018, according to Centum Annual Report and Financial Statements for the Year Ending 31 March 2018.
- Donald Kaberuka Chairman of Centum Investments Kenya
- Dorcas Muthoni, An Inductee to the Internet Hall of Fame
- Eddah Waceke Gachukia, Educationist, entrepreneur and co-founder of Riara Group of Schools
- Eunice Njambi Mathu, Founder and editor-in-chief of Parents Africa Magazine
- Gerishon Kamau Kirima, Real estate magnate
- James Mwangi & Family. This is a family of Kenyan bankers. Their main businesses include investments in Equity Bank Group, as well as real estate.
- James Mworia. CEO Centum Investments.
- Jane Wanjiru Michuki, Lawyer and investor.
- Jimnah Mbaru, Investment Banker, Entrepreneur and Founder Chairman of African Securities Exchanges Association
- John Gachora, Group CEO at NIC Bank Group
- Joseph Mucheru, Former Google Sub-Saharan Africa Lead and current Cabinet Secretary for ICT in Kenya.
- Manu Chandaria. He invests in steel, banking, stocks, and real estate.
- Mubarak Muyika, Silicon Valley–based Entrepreneur known for founding his first company at 16 and selling it two years later in a six figure deal.
- Mugo Kibati, Group CEO of Sanlam Kenya Plc and Chairman of Lake Turkana Wind Power
- Naushad Merali. His businesses include banking, hotels, dairy processing and real estate.
- Nelson Muguku Njoroge, Entrepreneur
- Njeri Rionge, technology entrepreneur who was a co-founder of the Internet Service Provider (ISP) Wananchi Online Limited (WOL), one of Kenya’s first internet providers
- Peter Munga, founder and chairman of Equity Group Holdings Limited, Eastern Africa's second largest bank by customers after C.B.E.
- Philip Ndegwa, Entrepreneur and former Governor of the Central Bank of Kenya
- Pius Ngugi Mbugua, Entrepreneur and owner of the Kenya Nut Company, one of the world's largest macadamia nut exporters
- Samuel Kamau Macharia, founder and chairman of Royal Media Services, the largest private radio and television network in Eastern Africa
- Simon Gicharu, Founder of Mount Kenya University, East and Central Africa's largest private university
- Swaleh Nguru. Business investor in ranching, real estate and sisal. Worth more than a billion Kenya shillings.
- Tabitha Karanja, Founder and CEO of Keroche Breweries, Kenya's second largest brewery
- Wanjiku Mugane Businesswoman and investment banker. Co-founder of First Africa Group which was later bought by Standard Chartered
- Wilfred Kiboro, Chairman of the Board of Directors at Nation Media Group, East Africa's largest media house. Former Group CEO.
