= Starehe Girls' Centre =

High school in Kenya

Information
- Established: 2005; 20 years ago
- Gender: Girls

Starehe Girls' Centre is a girls' high school in Nairobi, Kenya.

== History and operations ==
The school was established in 2005 when it took the premises of the Limuru Girls' Centre that had closed in 2002. A National Girls' School which focus in helping disadvantaged girls from low income earning families to access education.

It is a sister school of the Starehe Boys' Centre and School and it emulates its principals.

The school's director is Margaret Wanjohi.

Njambi was inspired to start a quality high school for bright girls from poor backgrounds following a conversation with Geoffrey Griffin, the founder of Starehe Boys’ Centre. Griffin had already been entertaining the thought over the years and was reserving part of the donations just in case. Njambi approached a number of successful women including respected educationist Eddah Gachukia. She also got veteran industrialist Manu Chandaria involved. Once the then Education Minister George Saitoti committed to provide teachers for the school, many people and institutions joined in after that including foreign embassies and the Starehe Boys' alumni. Starehe Girls' Centre was born and is 100% free with the government providing the teachers and the donors paying the support staff. Several girls from the school have secured admission in some of the world's best universities including Yale. Njambi is a member of the school's board of trustees.

In 2019 the school was a site of an incident of mass hysteria.

== See also ==
- Education in Kenya
- List of schools in Kenya
