= Two-thirds Gender Rule in Kenya =

The "two-thirds gender rule" enshrined in Article 27 of the Constitution of Kenya, makes the provision for gender equality in governance by mandating that "no more than two-thirds of members in elective or appointive bodies should be of the same gender". This principle aims to ensure gender equality in public institutions and political representation.

The constitution recognizes women, youth, people with disabilities, and ethnic minorities as special groups deserving of constitutional protection, with Article 81 (b) stating that "not more than two-thirds of the members of elective public bodies shall be of the same gender". Article 27 goes further to obligate the government to develop and pass policies and laws, including affirmative action programs and policies to address the past discrimination that women have faced.

It is one of the provisions of the new constitution under the Bill of Rights that has been praised among significant gains introduced by the constitution, but also one whose implementation has largely remained elusive, largely owing to a lack of political goodwill. Despite being a constitutional requirement, it has faced challenges, and the goal of achieving full gender parity remains elusive. Despite numerous court rulings and sustained advocacy by gender rights activists, Parliament has repeatedly failed to enact enabling legislation, leaving women underrepresented in leadership and decision-making spaces.

President William Ruto during his 2022 campaign promised that his government would deliver the elusive two-thirds gender, within a year, if elected in the August 2022 elections. Ruto, who was then speaking during Kenya's 2022 presidential debate, said he would, within 90 days, formulate a policy to oversee the implementation of the two-thirds gender rule, a promise that is yet to be actualised three years into office.

Legal battles

In a landmark ruling made in 2017, Justice John Mativo accused the National Assembly and the Senate of abdicating their constitutional mandate for failure to enact legislation to ensure gender equality and directed the Parliament of Kenya and the Attorney General to enact the two-thirds gender rule in 60 days. He also ruled that "Failure to pass the Two-Thirds Gender Bill was a gross violation of the Constitution. Eight years later, Justice Mativo's ruling has never been acted on.

== Female parliamentarians draft a bill to protect the two-thirds gender rule ==
In an effort to circumvent the barriers and frustrations over the failure to implement the two-thirds gender rule, Kenyan female members of parliament in 2015 opted to draft their own Bill on the two-thirds gender rule, to counter similar Bills that have been tabled in the National Assembly by the Justice and Legal Affairs committee.

The Bill sought to propose an increase in the number of elected Women Representatives to two per county. It also recommended that political parties be compelled to nominate a specified number of women as candidates for elective seats. However, this Bill failed five times in parliament over a lack of quorum, in a male-dominated house. The chairperson of the Kenya Women Parliamentarians Association ( KEWOPA), while defending the Bill, condemned another Bill (The Constitution of Kenya (Amendment) 2015) that had proposed the progressive implementation of the two-thirds gender rule, doing away with the five-year timeline.

== NGO challenges Attorney General in court over two-thirds gender rule ==
In 2015, a Kenyan non-governmental organization, The Centre for Rights Education and Awareness (CREAW), accused the then Attorney General Githu Muigai of failing to provide a relevant legal framework for the implementation of the two-thirds gender rule as stipulated in the constitution.CREAW, through its then Executive Director Ann Njogu, further asked the court to declare that the AG and CIC had failed to prepare the Bills and a further declaration that their actions are a violation of the Constitution. Two other NGO, including the Federation of Women Lawyers (FIDA) Kenya and the Kenya National Human Rights Commission, also joined in the case.

The non-profits sought orders directing the AG and the Commission for the Implementation of the Constitution (CIC) to prepare the relevant Bill for tabling in Parliament as provided for in articles 27(8) and 81(8) of the Constitution.
