= Riara University =

University in Kenya

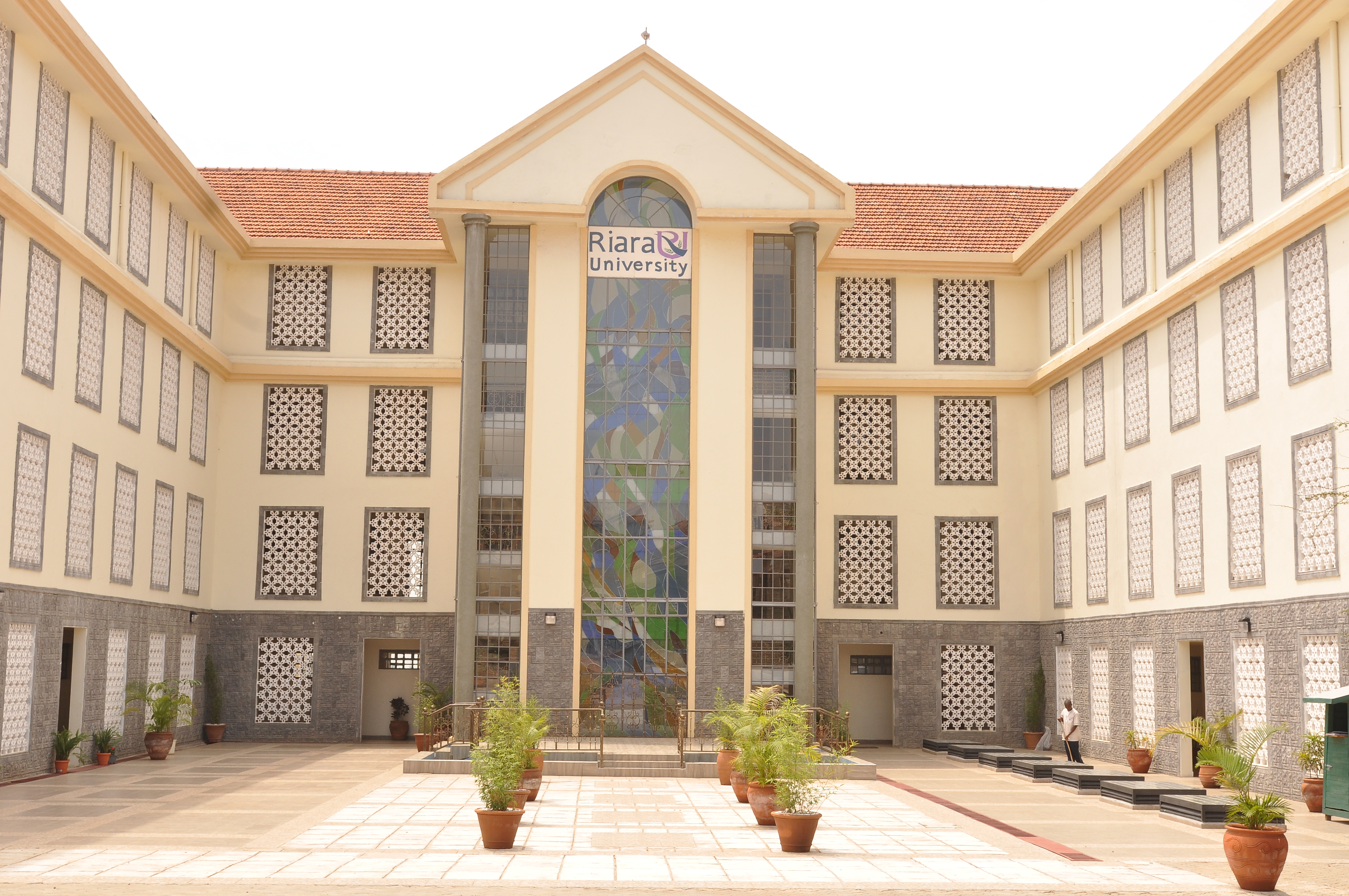
- Riara University Main Building
- Motto: Nurturing Innovators
- Type: Private
- Established: 2012
- Chancellor: Wilfred Kiboro
- Vice-Chancellor: Robert Gateru
- Location: Nairobi, Kenya; 1°18′53.0″S 36°48′25.2″E
- Campus: Mbagathi Way
- Website: www.riarauniversity.ac.ke

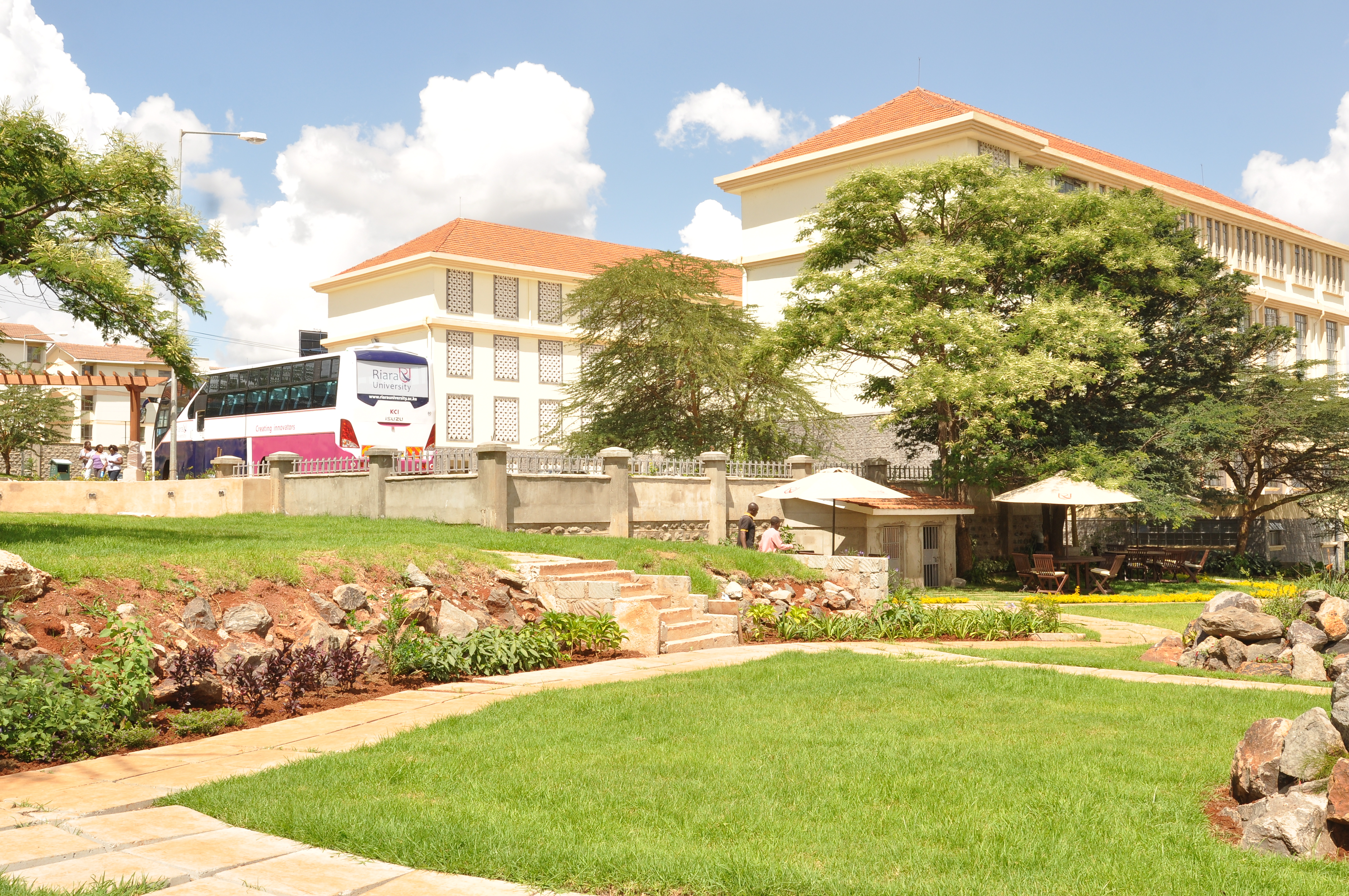
Riara University Garden

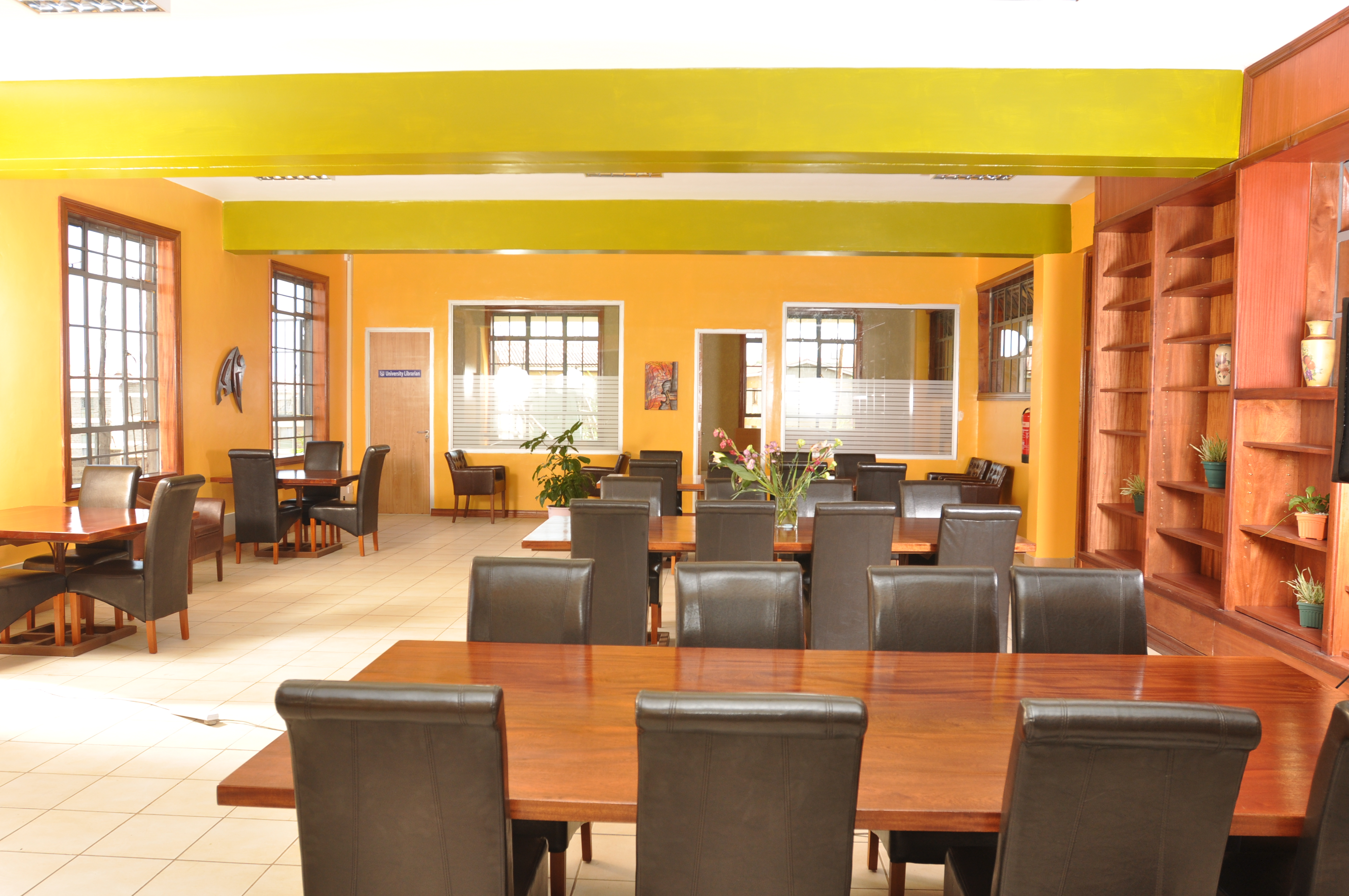
Riara University Lib

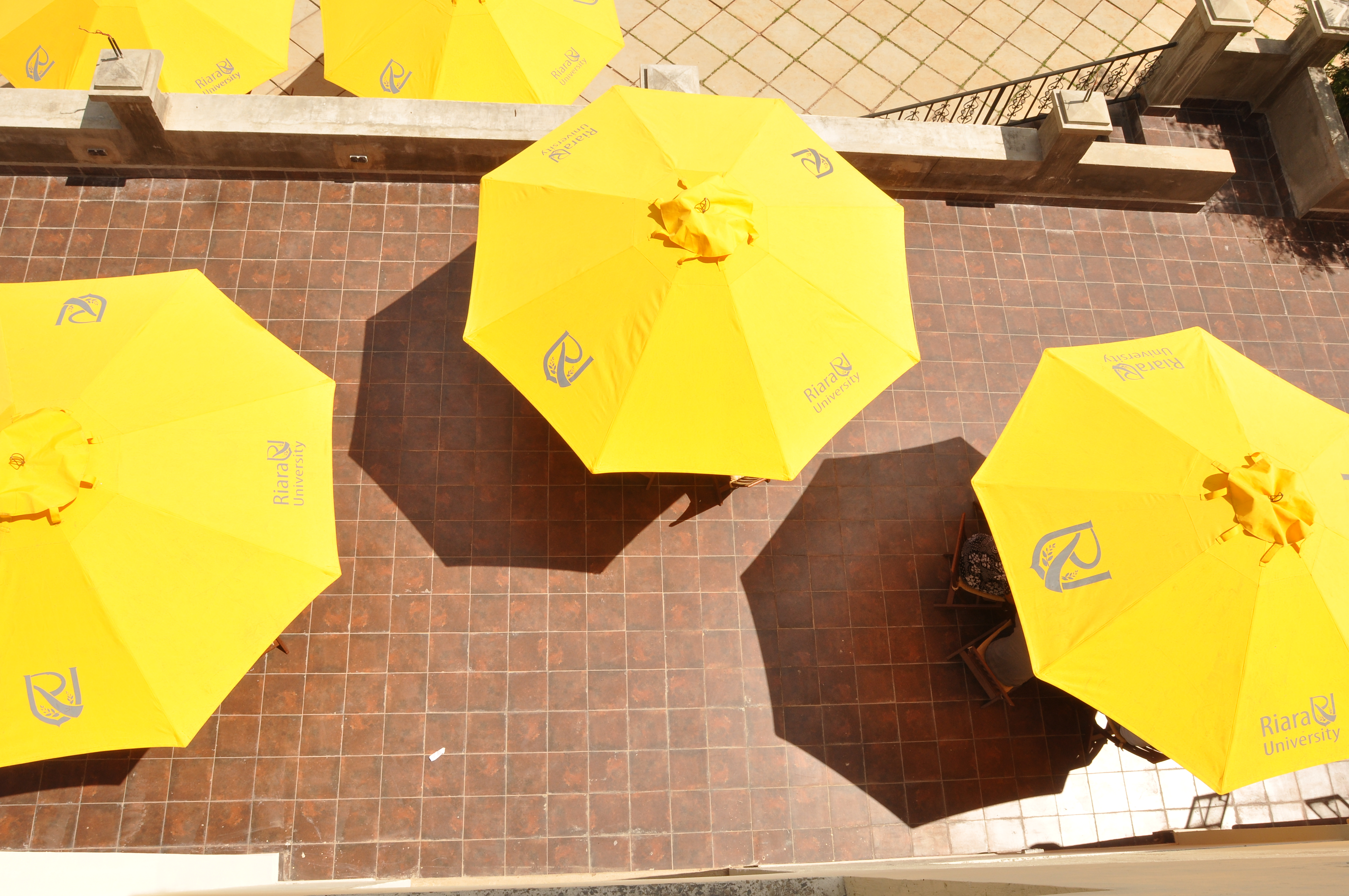
Riara University Cafeteria

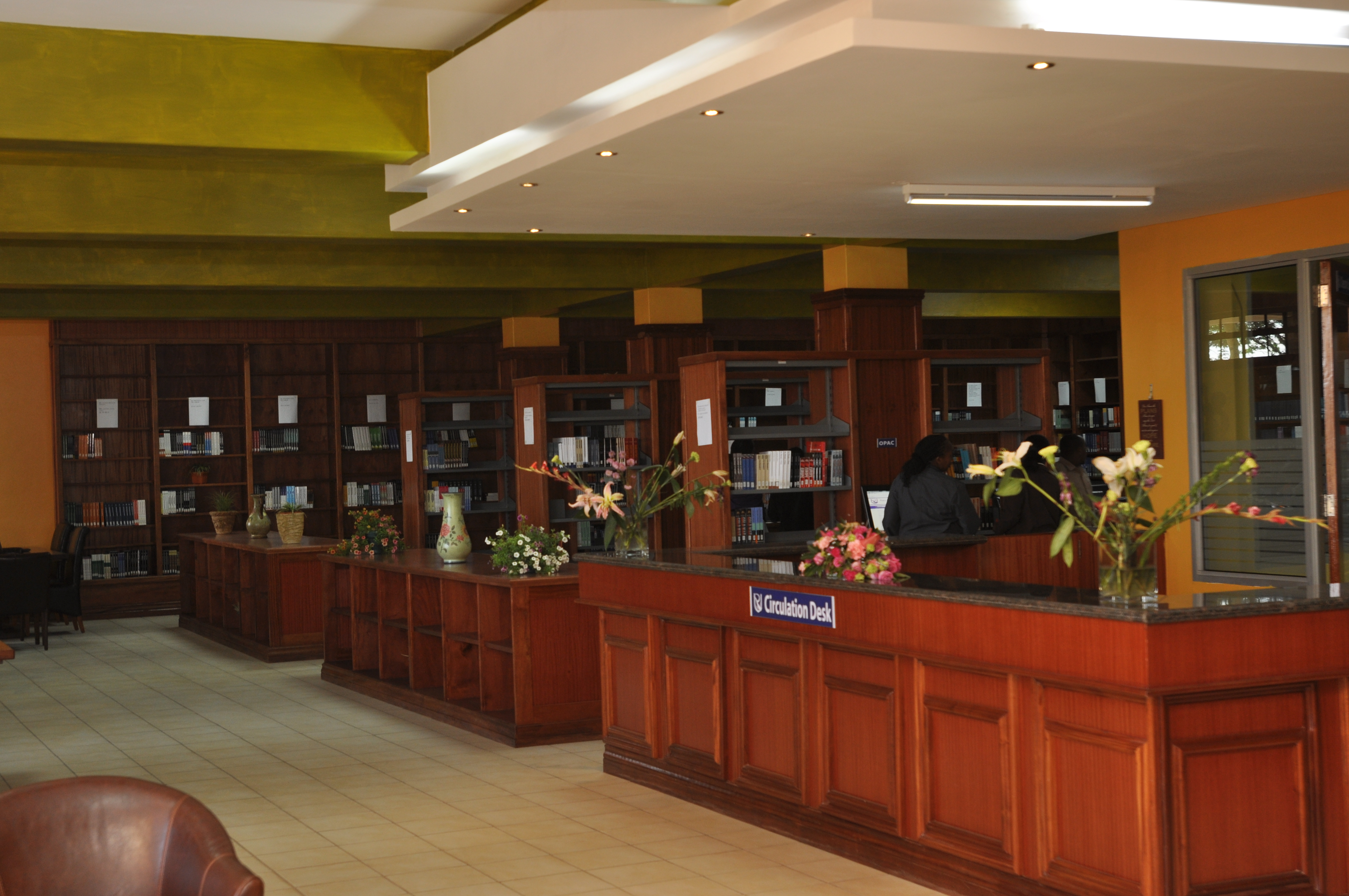
Riara University Library

Riara University is a Private University located along Raila Odinga way (formerly Mbagathi Way) in Nairobi, Kenya approximately 6km from Nairobi CBD .

== Location ==
The university's main campus is just next to Nyayo Highrise Estate in Kibera, Nairobi County, a fifteen minutes drive from Nairobi Central Business District.

In June 2024, Riara University began construction for its new campus in Konza technopolis, that will eventually be its new headquarters once completed.

== Foundation ==
Riara University was founded in 2012 by Mr. Daniel Gachukia and Dr. Eddah Gachukia. The couple are also the Founding Directors of The Riara Group of Schools, which comprises two Kindergartens, two Primary Schools, an international preparatory school,an international high school and a Girls’ Secondary School.

== Accreditation ==
The university is established under the Universities Act (2012), having been approved by the Commission for University Education to operate under a Letter of Interim Authority since 2 August 2012. In accordance with the provisions of the Act, the university is in the process of accreditation for Award of Full Charter and has already undergone the Technical Inspection by the Commission for University Education. The institution is hopeful that the Charter will be approved soon.

The university is fully accredited by the Council of Legal Education. The Council of Legal Education (CLE) is the statutory regulator of Legal Education and Training in Kenya, among other functions as stipulated in the Legal Education Act (2012). The university holds Full Accreditation status from the Kenya Accountants and Secretaries National Examinations Board (KASNEB) as a Training Centre as well as an Examinations Centre. The university runs Certified Public Accountant (CPA), Certified Secretary (CS), and Accounting Technicians Diploma (ATD) courses under this accreditation.

In 2021, the ministry of education introduced the Teacher Professional Development Program (TPD), all teachers employed by the Teachers Service Commission are to undergo the training. Riara University is one of the universities in Kenya that is offering this program. This is supposed to help in teachers performance appraisal and development an issue that stakeholders in the education sector more so teachers have different views on it.

== Governance ==
Governance of the school includes the following people:

Position	Name
Chancellor	Dr. Wilfred David Kiboro
Vice Chancellor	Prof. Robert Gateru
DVC Finance & Administration	Dr. Evans Ombima Amata
AG. DVC Academic Affairs & Dean	Prof. Wanja Tenambergen

=== Board of trustees ===
- Prof. Eddah Gachukia
- Daniel Gachukia
- Suzanne Gachukia
- Kimani Mathu
- Lawrence Mungai
- Margaret W. Wanjohi
- James Waiboci

== Faculties ==
The university offers undergraduate programs at the following schools:

- School of Education
- School of Computing Sciences
- School of Business
- Law School
- School of International Relations and Diplomacy
- School of Communication and Multimedia Journalism

== Riara University Library ==
The University Library hosts more than 6,700 print volumes, 75 journals, 35,000 e-databases as well as Wi-Fi internet access.
