= Daniel Kamau =

Kenyan musician (born 1949)

- Born: Daniel Kamau Mwai; February 1949 (age 77); Gatanga, Kenya
- Genres: Benga
- Occupation: Musician

Daniel Kamau Mwai "DK" (born February 1949 in Gatanga, Muranga District) is a musician from Kenya. He is of Kikuyu ethnic group and performs Benga music.

Kamau comes from the village of Mabanda in Gatanga. Failing to pay the tuition, 1967 he dropped out of the Karatina High School in 1967. He decided to pursue a career in music, and released his first record in 1968.

He made a breakthrough in 1970 when he released the "Murata/I Love You", which became a national hit. Around the same time he established a music studio of his own, the DK Nguvu Sounds. It would later attract musicians like Kakai Kilonzo.

In 1977 his songs "Nana" and "Mwithua" were banned by the then state radio monopoly Kenya Broadcasting Corporation due to alleged obscenity. In 1990 he formed a new band, the Lulus Band.

He was the civic councillor of the Gatanga ward from 1979 to 1992.

As of 2009 he is still performing, and has written over 1000 songs during his career. He is also releasing music videos of his past hits.
