= Ndereba =

Ndereba is a surname. Notable people with the surname include:

- Anastasia Ndereba (born 1974), Kenyan marathon runner, sister of Catherine
- Catherine Ndereba (born 1972), Kenyan marathon runner
