= David Muchoki Kanja =

United Nations official

David Muchoki Kanja is the first and current holder of the newly created position of United Nations Assistant Secretary-General for the Office of Internal Oversight Services. Prior to this appointment of 24 April 2012, Mr. Kanja had served as the Director of the United Nations Children’s Fund’s (UNICEF) Office of Internal Audit, overseeing all of the internal audit and investigation activities of the organization.

== Biographical Information ==
Mr. Kanja has a wealth of experience in audit having previously worked as the Chief Auditor for audit quality and strategy, Audit Manager and Acting Auditor General at the World Bank. Before that, he had served for nine years at the Big Four audit firm Deloitte, in various positions, including as Audit Manager in the United Kingdom and Senior Manager in Kenya.

== Education ==
Ms. Kanja holds a Bachelor of Commerce Degree from the University of Nairobi in Kenya. He is a Certified Internal Auditor, Chartered Accountant (England and Wales) and Certified Public Accountant (Kenya).
