= Awadh Saleh Sherman =

Swaleh Sherman(Swaleh Nguru)
- Born: 4 October 1932; Mombasa, Kenya, East Africa
- Died: 21 May 2024 (aged 91)
- Occupations: Businessman, Conservationist, Philanthropist
- Years active: 1950–1972
- Known for: Net Worth, Business Ventures, Conservation, Philanthropy, Land Ownership in Mombasa
- Spouse: Dalila (m. 1960)
- Children: Awadh Saleh,Said Swaleh,Farouq Swaleh
- Parent(s): Saleh; Salha

Swaleh Nguru Sherman (Arabic: عوض صالح شرمان النهدي (4 October 1932 – 21 May 2024) was a Kenyan business magnate, investor and philanthropist popularly known by his moniker Swaleh Nguru.

Sherman was a highly influential billionaire businessman, conservationist, and philanthropist of Yemeni descent. He rose from humble beginnings as a fishmonger selling kingfish (known as nguru in Swahili) and a bicycle repairer to become one of the wealthiest individuals in the coastal region, famously owning roughly one-third of Mombasa Island during the mid-20th century.

He died on May 21, 2024, at the age of 91

== Early life ==
Swaleh was born in Bondeni, Mombasa. As the eldest of eight siblings, he helped his father, who worked as a taxi driver, which sparked his lifelong passion for motor vehicles. He opened a bicycle repair shop in Tudor, which expanded into the highly popular Swaleh Nguru Garage—a frequent spot for prominent historical political figures like Jomo Kenyatta and Tom Mboya

== Business career ==
Swaleh started Swaleh Nguru Garage, repairing and selling second hand vehicles. He later, invested heavily into real estate, construction and ranching. At one point he owned a third of Mombasa Island, mainly the town of Majengo. He later subdivided the land into sub-plots and sold them.

He was the founder, chairman and chief executive officer of Kilindini Warehouses and AGRO Processors, which at the time was one of the major corporations in his conglomerate. He traded in other commodities such as grain, tea, coffee and nuts. He owned one of the largest sisal plantations in Kenya at Taru, making him one of the largest sisal producer and exporters in Kenya at the time. He also owned several large real estate properties in Kenya, which have been the subject of controversy in the media, with relatives claiming rights to his estate and riots reportedly occurring following the eviction of squatters from his land.

== Philanthropy ==
He was a leading conservationist in Kenya protecting over 100,000 hectares of forest and wildlife. His most notable conservancy is in Kipini, Nairobi Ranch. Swaleh Nguru Camp, was a donation to the UNHCR to settle and provide for refugees.

== Recognition ==
Swaleh Nguru Road in Tudor was named in his honor. He has also received the Head of State Commendation and several recognitions from UNEP, UNHCR, and WFP.

== Personal life and death ==
He was a billionaire who disliked involvement in politics. His family was then known to be very philanthropic. Although they do not disclose their charitable work, they have been known to donate much of their wealth for feeding programs and land settlements of displaced peoples.

Sherman died on 21 May 2024, at the age of 91.

== See also ==
- List of wealthiest people in Kenya
- List of African millionaires
- List of Kenyans
- Hadhrami people
- Arab diaspora

== Notes ==
Awadh is referred to as Swaleh Nguru. His father was also referred to as Swaleh Nguru.
