= Gitura Mwaura =

Kenyan writer

Gitura Mwaura is a Nairobi, Kenya-based writer currently working as a media consultant with various organisations. He is an author and development journalist previously involved in the areas, among others, of gender and conflict management as a researcher and human rights activist working with various local and international non-governmental organisations.

Gitura has worked in both electronic and print media, and contributes to the local media, both in Rwanda and Kenya. He writes a weekly column for Rwanda’s The New Times newspaper.

His collection of short stories, Portraits of the Heart, was published in 2001 (Focus Books). He co-authored the book, Resilience of a Nation: A History of the Military in Rwanda (Fountain Publishers, 2009). One of his short stories, The Request, has been included in the anthology, The doomed conspiracy and other stories (East African Educational Publishers, 2011). His book, The Painting: Four Sketches and a Poem, was published in 2013 (Amazon).

Gitura is formerly the chairperson of the Kenya Coalition for Access to Essential Medicines (KCAEM), which played an important role in successfully lobbying the Kenyan Government, Parliament and international pharmaceutical companies to enable easy access to essential for the treatment of malaria and TB, and, most notably, HIV anti-retroviral drugs.

He currently is the Program Associate with the regional East African Community Media Network (EACOMNET).

== Portraits of the Heart ==
Gitura’s signature book, Portraits of the Heart, is a collection of eleven short stories that deal with such themes as separation, illness and death in the family setup. Other issues tackled in the book are AIDS, infertility and parent-children relationships.

== The Painting: Four Sketches and a Poem ==
The Painting: Four Sketches and a Poem is a collection of fiction stories depicting poignant and evocative moments in the lives of four women in Eastern Africa, including Lucy, the 3.2 million-old hominid famously believed to be one of the ancestors of modern humans.

== Resilience of a Nation: A History of the Military in Rwanda ==
Rwanda is believed to have emerged around the Tenth or Eleventh Century that endured a socio-military nation. Resilience of a Nation examines the role the military has played throughout the history of Rwanda to date. The book looks at the different phases the Rwandan military has undergone, from the traditional, the colonial and immediate post-independence military to the present.

== Articles ==
One of the more prominent writers in the East African region, numerous Gitura Mwaura articles have been published by various newspapers and newsletters. These publications include The Standard, The New Times, The Daily Nation, The EastAfrican, Blogger News Network, etc.
