= Carole Wainaina =

Kenyan businesswoman and public administrator

- Born: 1966 (age 59–60); Kenya
- Citizenship: Kenya
- Education: University of Southern Queensland
- Occupations: Businesswoman, public administrator
- Years active: 1987–present
- Title: Former United Nations Secretary General for Human Resources
- Term: October 2014 – April 2017
- Predecessor: Catherine Pollard

Carole Wamuyu Wainaina was the United Nations Assistant Secretary-General for Human Resources from October 2014 till April 2017, replacing Catherine Pollard. Prior to this appointment announced on 25 September 2014 by United Nations Secretary-General Ban Ki-moon, Ms. Wainaina was Chief Human Resources Officer and a member of the Executive Committee at Royal Philips in the Netherlands. She is currently working as the chief operating officer for Africa50 Infrastructure Fund.

== Biographical Information ==
Ms. Wainaina was born in the year 1966 in Kenya. She has extensive experience in various areas of management including human resources strategy, leadership development, change management and driving organizational transformation. She started her career as a management consultant at Price Waterhouse Coopers in Kenya. She has held high-level positions with Royal Philips and Coca-Cola. In 1998, Ms. Wainaina was offered her job at Coca-Cola and she moved with her two children to London. During her thirteen years at Coca-Cola, she held various positions such as President of the Coca-Cola Africa Foundation, Chief of Staff of the Chairman and CEO, and Group Human Resources Director Eurasia and Africa. At Royal Philips, she held her position on the Executive Committee for three years from 2011 to 2014. She also worked at the Kenya Wildlife Service as the Special Assistant to the Director Richard Leakey.

== Education ==
Ms. Wainaina holds a Bachelor of Business Degree from the University of Southern Queensland in Australia, where she majored in Human Resources Management and Marketing.
