= Dorcas Muthoni =

Kenyan computer engineer and businesswoman

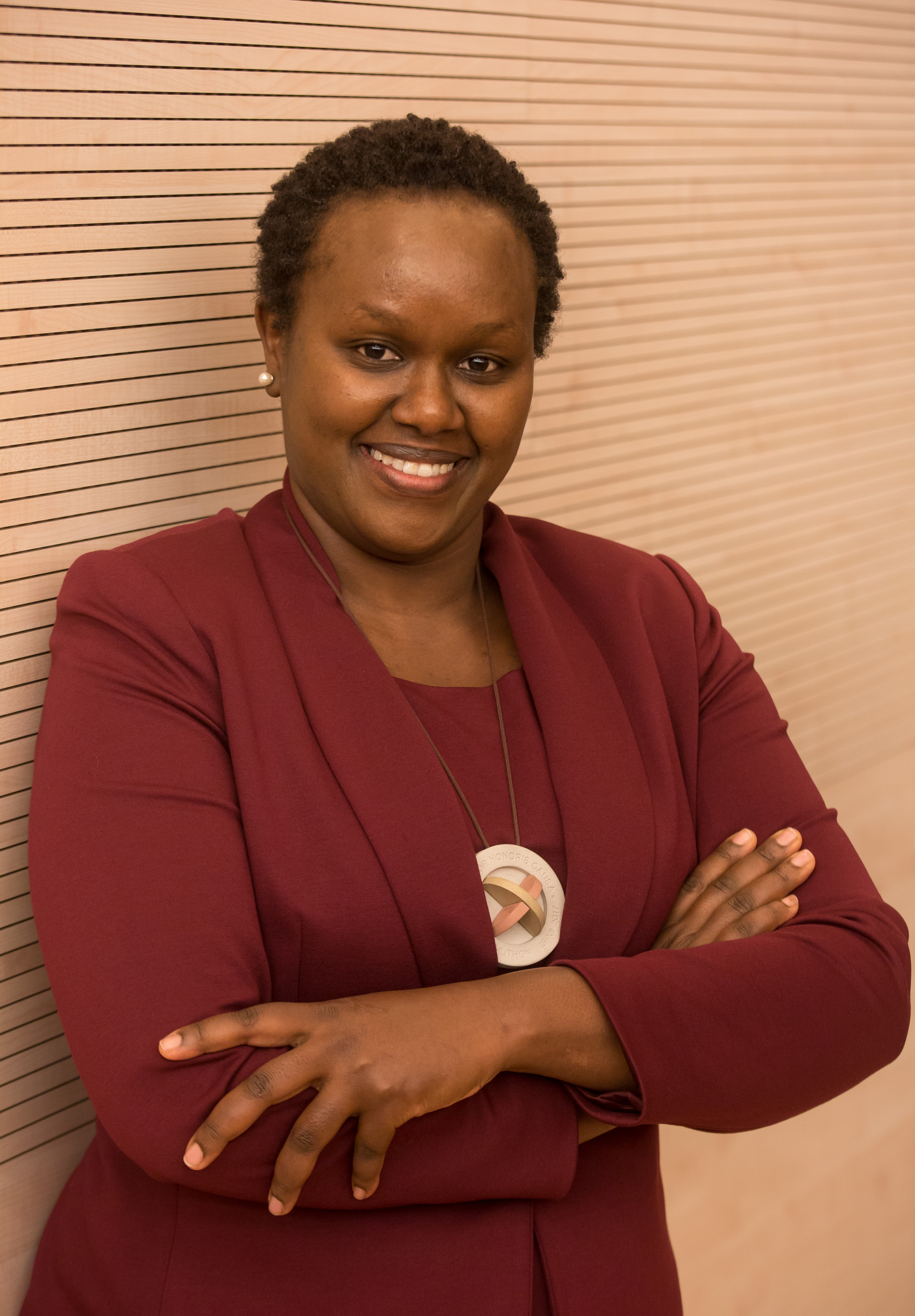
- Born: 1979; Nyeri
- Awards: Internet Hall of Fame (2014)

Dorcas Muthoni (born 1979 in Nyeri) is a Kenyan entrepreneur, computer scientist and founder of OPENWORLD LTD, a software consulting company she started at the age of 24. Through her work as an entrepreneur and computer scientist, Muthoni seeks to see technology positively transforming the lives of the African society, governments and enterprises.

== Biography ==
She graduated in Computer Science from the University of Nairobi, has specialized training in wireless networks, radio-communications and strategic technology planning, among other subjects. Through her everyday work as a businesswoman and computer scientist, she seeks to see technology positively transform the life of the African society and businesses.

OPENWORLD has been involved in the delivery of some most widely used Web and cloud applications in Africa, such as ARIS, an African Union reporting application used by all 54 member states; the Performance Management System for the Government of Kenya, automating performance contracting in the public sector; and OpenBusiness, a revolutionary cloud-based small- and medium-size business management tool.

Muthoni is also the founder of the regional organization AfChix, a mentorship and capacity building initiative for women in computing across Africa. Since 2004, AfChix activities have included organizing annual Computing Career Conferences with a special emphasis on encouraging computing careers for young women and high school girls; continuous career development for women in technology and role-modeling for upcoming women in computing. This passion and involvement has made her a role model herself, for women and girls in the African community.

Muthoni has been an Internet Society (ISOC) Fellow to the Internet Engineering Task Force (IETF) and World Bank infoDev Global Forum. In 2008, she was an Anita Borg Institute for Women and Technology's Change Agent award winner and in 2009 she was selected as a Women's Forum Rising Talent, a network of highly talented women with the potential to become influential figures in the future. In 2013, she was selected as a World Economic Forum Young Global Leader, a panel of distinguished leaders from around the world under the age of 40. In 2017, the Pompeu Fabra University made Honoris Causa for her significant work in the promotion of engineering studies among girls in Africa, the mentoring of young people, and her social commitment in the fight against poverty.

She received the Anita Borg Institute for Women and Technology's Change Agent award in 2008.
