= Ann Njogu =

Kenyan activist

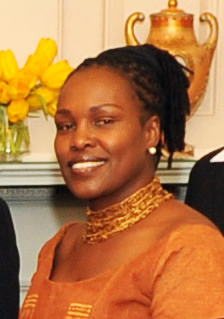
- Njogu in 2010
- Born: Kenya
- Citizenship: Kenyan
- Education: Mugoiri Girls High School; University of Nairobi (LLB, 1989)
- Occupations: Activist, Lawyer
- Organization(s): Centre for Rights Education and Awareness (CREAW)
- Known for: Advocacy against sexual and gender-based violence; Constitutional reform activism; Lobbying for the Sexual Offences Act (2006)
- Awards: International Women of Courage Award (2010)

Ann Njogu is a Kenyan activist . In 2010, she was the director of the Centre for Rights Education and Awareness, which among other things documented sexual- and gender-based violence after the Kenyan general election in December 2007. She was also a drafter of and lobbyist for Kenya’s Sexual Offences Act, which became law in 2006.

== Background ==
She attended Mugoiri Girls High School and later The University of Nairobi where she graduated with a degree in law in 1989.

In addition to her work on sexual and gender violence, Njogu was the Co-Chair of the Multi-Sectoral Committee on Constitutional Reform, the Co-Chair of the Joint Dialogue Forum on Constitutional Reform, and a delegate to the Bomas National Conference on Constitutional Reforms. In 2007, she was attacked and arrested by state security forces for demanding that Members of Parliament review their salaries, which were very large despite Kenya's poverty. She and the others who were arrested filed a Constitutional reference popularly known as "Ann Njogu and others versus the State," which was successful in limiting the time a Kenyan citizen could be held in custody to 24 hours. In 2008, she was a co-convenor of the Civil Society Congress, which worked to improve politics after the violence in the wake of the December 2007 Kenyan elections.

In 2008 she was beaten and sexually molested by the police when they arrested her and others for suggesting corruption might have occurred in the sale of the Grand Regency Hotel.

Njogu received a 2010 International Women of Courage award.

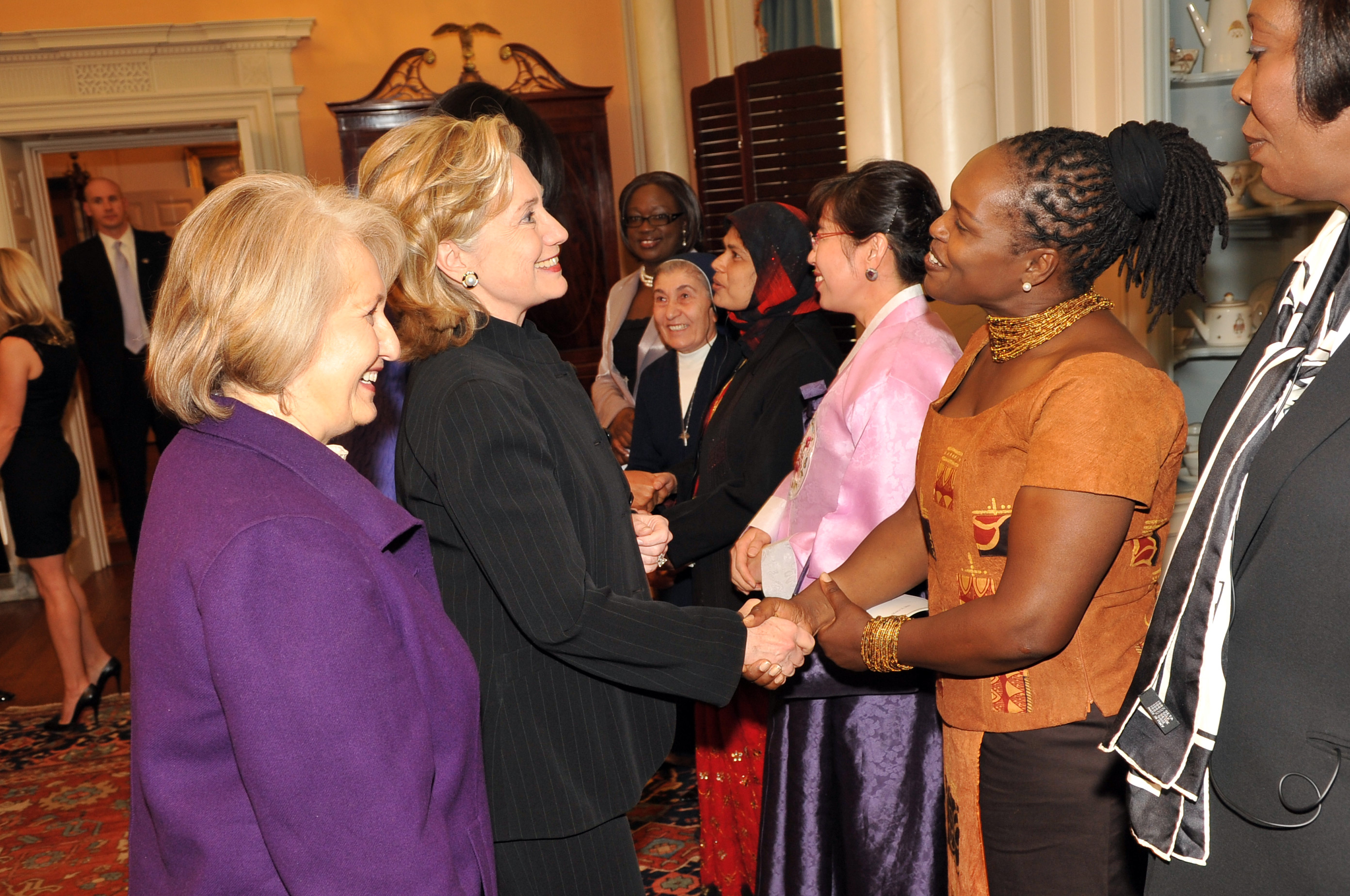
Ann Njogu (centre) shaking hands with U.S. Secretary of State Hillary Clinton, 2010

In 2012 she and her son were charged with assaulting her father but in 2013 they was acquitted.

In recent years, Ann Njogu has continued to engage in social justice work, including health advocacy. During the COVID-19 pandemic, she participated in campaigns against vaccine inequality, including the #EndVaccineInjusticeInAfrica effort supported by organizations like Amref Health Africa. In 2022, she stated in an interview that she considers herself “an activist for life,” describing her ongoing work in writing, community mentoring, and legal advocacy. Njogu has also written poetry, including a collection titled The Vernette’s Heart, reflecting themes of resilience, identity, and social justice.
