= Mugo Kibati =

Kenyan business executive (born 1969)

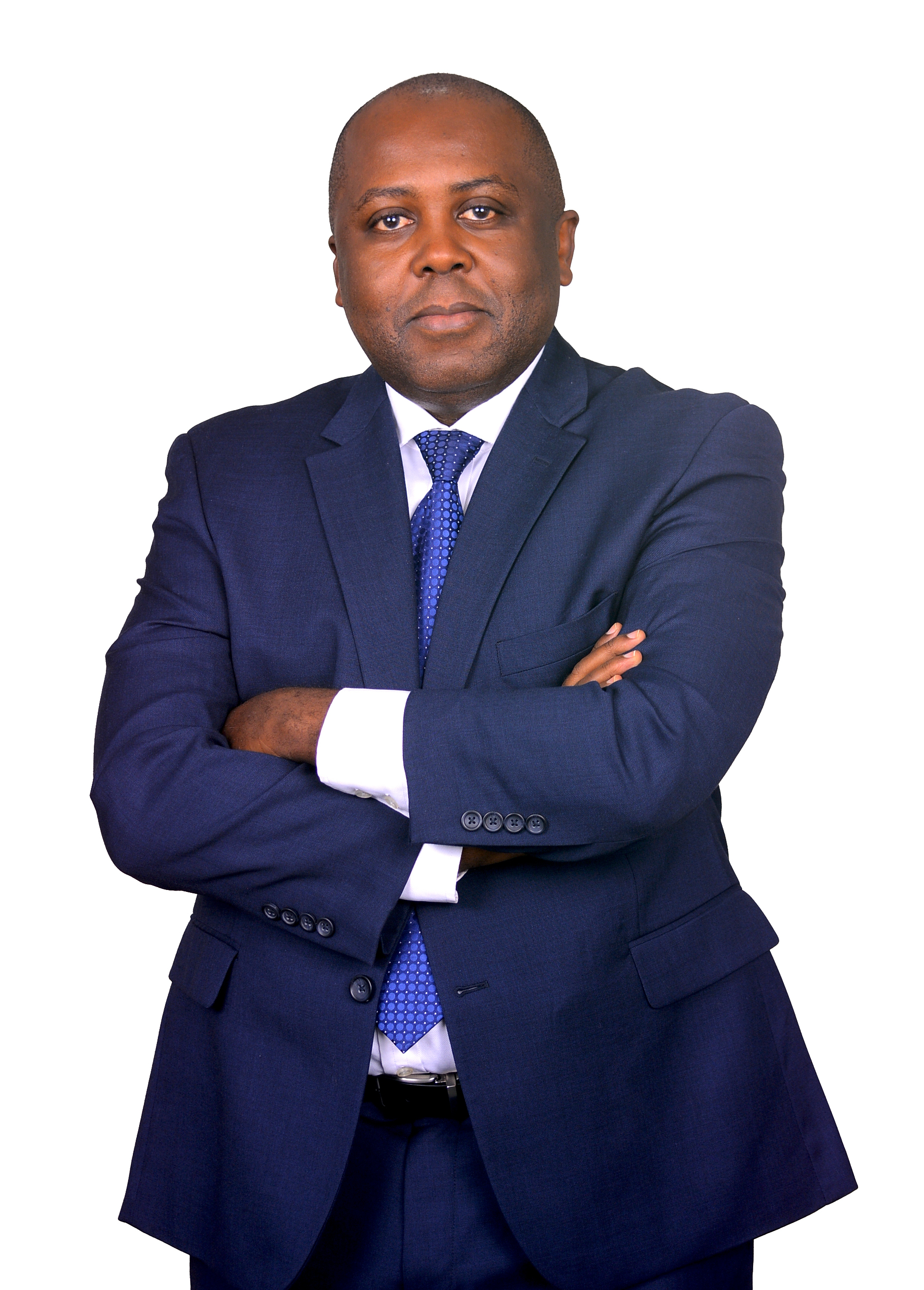
- Born: 1969 (age 56–57)
- Education: Moi University; Massachusetts Institute of Technology; George Washington University School of Business; St Peter's College, Oxford
- Title: Chief Executive Officer, Telkom Kenya; Chairman, Lake Turkana Wind Power Station
- Website: mugokibati.com

Mugo Kibati (born 1969) is a Kenyan business executive who is the CEO of Telkom Kenya, a company that provides a full range service of fixed and mobile communication services, both voice and data, provided to the corporate, government and SME sectors.

Kibati is also the Chairman of the Lake Turkana Wind Power Project (LTWP), a company with 40,000 acres (162km2) of land, 301 MW electricity production capacity, 365 turbines and a capital cost of Ksh 76 billion (€623 million). LTWP is the largest wind energy power plant in Africa.

Kibati has served on several corporate boards, including I&M Bank and the Apollo Group. He has also held top national industry leadership positions at the Federation of Kenya Employers, the Kenya Association of Manufacturers (KAM) and the Kenya Private Sector Alliance (KEPSA). He also served on the Board of Governors and chaired the Old Boys' Association of the Alliance High School for several years.

== Early life and education ==
Raised in Nakuru and Mombasa, Kibati graduated from Moi University in 1991, with a Bachelor of Technology (Electrical Engineering) degree. He holds a Master of Science degree in Technology and Policy, from the Massachusetts Institute of Technology (MIT). The Technology and Policy Program (TPP) at MIT "addresses societal challenges ... at the intersection of technology and policy, mobilizing science and engineering to inform intelligent, responsible strategies and policies to benefit communities from local to global."

Kibati's other credentials include a Master of Business Administration degree from George Washington University School of Business. He also holds a Certificate in European Union Economics from Oxford University, St. Peters College, in the United Kingdom.

== Career ==
An engineer by training, Kibati worked at Lucent Technologies, in the United States as a Technical Marketing Manager. He also worked at the Bamburi Cement Company Limited (Lafarge Copee) from November 1991 to May 1997 following an early stint at the Kenya Petroleum Refineries in Mombasa, Kenya.

From 2004 Kibati served as CEO and Group managing director of the East African Cables for four years until June 2008. During this time, the company implemented a successful diversification and growth strategy, increasing annual revenues from KSh. 400 million to Ksh. 3.5 billion, profits from KSh. 15 million to Ksh. 600 million. The strategy included negotiated strategic partnership with a leading global cable manufacturer and acquisition of manufacturing facilities in Tanzania and South Africa. By the end of his tenure, the company has achieved 'blue chip' status as well as the fastest-growing share price on the Nairobi Stock Exchange (2005/6) while exceeding statutory transparency obligations.

In July 2009, Kibati was appointed Director General of Kenya Vision 2030. In that role, Kibati spearheaded the implementation of Kenya Vision 2030, the official national strategy to transform Kenya into a newly industrialized country by the year 2030. During his tenure, Kibati, with the support of his colleagues in government, the private sector and civil society, laid the foundation for structured national. He is also credited with rallying diverse stakeholders toward consensus on the pathway to economic growth and social development. He exited the role in October 2013.

In February 2015, Kibati joined Sanlam Kenya (then PanAfrica Insurance), an insurance and investment company and a member of the South-African Sanlam Group, as CEO. He held this position through March 2018.

In February 2016, Kibati was appointed as the Chairman of M-kopa Solar, a role he held until November 2018. The company has connected over 600,000 homes to affordable solar power, with 500 new homes being added on a daily basis.

Since 2017, Kibati was appointed as the Chairman of Lake Turkana Wind Power Limited. Completed in January 2017, the 40,000-acre, 310MW wind farm is the largest inward investment into Kenya since its independence, and the largest wind power transaction in Africa's history to date.

== Awards ==
- Elder of the Burning Spear (2012)
- Fellow of the Young African Leaders Initiative (2012)
- Member of the Aspen Institute Global Leadership Network (2010)
- Moran of the Burning Spear (2008)
- Young Global Leader by the World Economic Forum (2008)
