= Nelson Muguku =

Kenyan entrepreneur

- Born: 1932; Kanyariri Village, Kiambu County, Kenya
- Died: October 10, 2010 (aged 77–78)
- Occupation(s): Entrepreneur, investor
- Known for: One Kenya's richest people prior to his death
- Spouse: Leah Wanjiku
- Children: 7

Nelson Muguku Njoroge was a Kenyan entrepreneur, investor and one of the country's wealthiest persons. He started his career with two chickens and ended up running a number of businesses and investing in stocks, real estate, and education.

== Early life and education ==
Muguku was born in 1932 in Kanyariri Village, Kikuyu Division, Kiambu County to his father Njoroge and mother Mama Wambui. The entrepreneurial nature of his father was a key inspiration to his later life. Muguku sat for the Kenya African Preliminary Examination at Kabete Intermediate School. It was the second time he was doing the exam and his relatively high score led to allegations of cheating and the nullification of his results by the colonial administrators. He was ordered to join carpentry classes at Thika Technical School from 1950 to 1953.

== Early career ==
Muguku started off as a carpentry teacher at Kapenguria Intermediate School before he was transferred to Kabianga Teachers College (now Kabianga High School). In 1957, at age 24 and against the wishes of his parents, he quit teaching to concentrate on the poultry business he had started a year earlier with just two hens, a cock and KShs 2,000. He also resented the fact that he was required to pursue additional training if he wanted to get a job promotion but this was not forthcoming when he did obtain additional training. He initially reared the chicken with his father's help. Muguku's wife would quit her teaching job at Kagaa Primary School Githunguri in 1963 to help him run the business.

== Business career ==
=== Muguku Poultry Farm ===
In 1965, Muguku bought the 22-acre Star Ltd farm from a white veterinary doctor for Kshs 100,000. He renamed the farm Muguku Poultry Farm and started a hatchery with a 9,000-egg incubator. His growing business saw him at one time supply eggs to Governor-General Malcolm MacDonald and the country's first Prime Minister Jomo Kenyatta. Today, the farm can hatch 500,000 chicks a day and also hosts dairy cows as well as an orchard.

=== Stock market ===
Muguku was an active investor in various counters at the Nairobi Securities Exchange. However, it was for his stake in Equity Bank that he was best known. He acquired a 6.08% stake before the bank was listed and was for years the bank's largest individual shareholder. By 2014, the Muguku family had reduced its stake in the bank to 0.9% valued at KShs 1.6 billion (equivalent to US$17 million at the time).

=== Real Estate ===
Muguku owned a building on Mfangano Street in downtown Nairobi and was a major property owner in Kikuyu town. In 2014, through Crossroads Limited, the Muguku family embarked on the construction of phase 1 of the Karen Waterfront mall at an estimated cost of Kshs 2.6 billion (equivalent to US$28 million at the time). The family also owns Crossroads Mall in the same area.

=== Schools ===
Muguku was the proprietor of two primary schools (Kidfarmaco and Kikuyu Township) and one high school (Tumaini School formerly known as Greenacres School).

== Philanthropy ==
Muguku built the Anglican Church in Kikuyu including the pastor's residence. He helped rehabilitate street children in Kikuyu town.

== Personal life ==
Muguku was married to Leah Wanjiku and they had seven children. Kihumbu Thairu, vice-chancellor and a founder member of Presbyterian University of East Africa, is Muguku’s younger brother.

== Death ==
Muguku died on 10 October 2010 at the age of 78 years. He was a diabetic.
