= Jane Wanjiru Michuki =

Kenyan businesswoman and lawyer

- Born: Kenya
- Education: University of Nairobi (Bachelor of Laws); Kenya School of Law (Diploma in Legal Practice); University of Warwick (Master of Laws)
- Occupations: Lawyer, Businesswoman & Investor
- Years active: 1997 — present
- Known for: Legal Skills, Business Acumen, Net Worth
- Title: Managing Partner; Kimani & Michuki Advocates

Jane Wanjiru Michuki is a Kenyan businesswoman, investor and lawyer. She is the Managing Partner at Kimani & Michuki Advocates, a corporate law firm based in Nairobi whose client list includes Equity Group Holdings Limited, the largest bank holding company on the African continent with over 9.2 million customers as of 30 June 2014.

She is the largest female stockholder on the Nairobi Stock Exchange (NSE), with an estimated net worth of approximately US$50 million, as of November 2014, making her one of the wealthiest people in Kenya.

== Education and career ==
She was born and raised in Kenya, the largest economy in the East African Community. She attended the University of Nairobi, graduating with the degree of Bachelor of Laws. She also holds the postgraduate Diploma in Legal Practice, obtained from the Kenya School of Law. Her Master of Laws was obtained from Warwick University in the United Kingdom. She is one of two partners in the law firm of Kimani & Michuki Advocates, serving there as the Managing Partner.

== Investment portfolio ==
Jane Wanjiru Michuki owns shares of stock in the publicly traded companies listed below, as of November 2014.

Jane Wanjiru Michuki Investment Portfolio
Rank	Investment	Percentage Shareholding	Estimated Value (US$)
1	British-American Investments Company*	9.5	52 million
2	Equity Group Holdings Limited*	Not Known	Not Known

- Shares traded on Nairobi Stock Exchange.

== See also ==
- List of wealthiest people in Kenya
- Economy of Kenya
