= Pius Ngugi =

Kenyan entrepreneur and one of the wealthy persons

Pius Ngūgi
- Born: March 8, 1944 (age 82); Kiambu County, Kenya
- Occupation: Entrepreneur
- Known for: One of Kenya's wealthiest people
- Spouse: Josephine Wambūi Ngūgi

Pius Ngūgi Mbūgua, is a Kenyan entrepreneur who is one of the country's wealthiest persons.

== Early life ==
Ngūgi was born in Kiambu County on 8 March 1944. He is married to Josephine Wambūi Ngūgi.

== Business ==
Ngūgi owns Thika Coffee Mills and the Kenya Nut Company. He is a shareholder in Kenya Alliance Insurance. His other interests include sweet manufacturing, dairy farming, winery and Amazon Motors.

=== Thika Coffee Mills ===
Thika Coffee Mills is a major private coffee miller in Kenya.

=== Kenya Nut Company ===
Kenya Nut Company was founded in 1974 and has 2,500 employees. It is a major player in the global macadamia nuts market. In 2006, Kenya earned Kshs 2.3 billion (equivalent to US$33 million then) from macadamia nut exports. Kenya Nut Company is the main exporter of macadamia nuts from Kenya.

=== Tatu City ===
Ngūgi is a shareholder in the Tatu City project where partners include Renaissance Capital co-founder and millionaire Stephen Jennings. Tatu City, a 2,500 acre (1,000 ha) live-work-play development 18 kilometers outside central Nairobi, is expected to be one of the largest real estate projects in Kenya's history and home to 100,000 residents.
