= Gerishon Kirima =

Kenyan investor and politician (d. 2010)

Gerishon Kamau Kirima was a major Kenyan real estate investor and a former Member of Parliament.

== Early life ==
Kirima was born in Kiruri village, a tea-growing area of Murang’a County on the slopes of the Aberdares. He dropped out of school at an early age.

== Business ==
Kirima relocated from his village to the Kinangop Plateau where he started a carpentry business. In the early 1960s after Kenya had attained independence, he moved to Nairobi and registered his business Kirima and Sons Ltd. He was the pioneer carpenter at the University of Nairobi and operated a small workshop in Bahati and later on in Kaloleni. His first wife, Agnes, would help attend to customers at the Kaloleni workshop. Taking advantage of the rural-urban migration to Nairobi that resulted from the dawn of independence and the end of the state of emergency, Kirima opened bars and butcheries in Asian and African neighborhoods to cater for the growing moneyed class. He is considered a pioneer of nyama choma, a popular Kenyan delicacy.

By 1967, and to the surprise of the better educated African civil servants, Kirima had saved enough money to buy 500 acres of land in Nairobi from an Italian Donenico Masi, which the De Masi family have contested claiming that Kirima grabbed the land since he does not have the title deed. In the same year, Kirima bought two more farms in Nairobi - 108 acres from Charles Case and 472 acres from Percy Randall. With these acquisitions, Kirima had positioned himself to be a major meat supplier for Nairobi.

As chairman of the African Butchers Association (later the Kenya National Butchers Union), he successfully lobbied the government for permission to sell meat in the city, a privilege that was hitherto reserved for the still settler-controlled Kenya Meat Commission (KMC) which did not buy meat from African farmers. Kirima started a private abattoir in Njiru, a development that some believe led to the eventual collapse of the KMC years later.

He would venture into the transport business by launching the Kirima Bus Services. However, the business didn't last long following the liberalization of upcountry transportation by the government in 1973. He opted to focus on real estate mostly concentrating on building rental housing in the low income Eastlands area of Nairobi.

== Political career ==
Kirima served for many years as a city councilor and briefly as deputy mayor. In 1989, Starehe Constituency Member of Parliament Kiruhi Kimondo was dismissed by his party KANU in 1989. By-elections were held the same year. Kirima contested the seat on a KANU ticket and won. He remained in office until the 1992 General Elections when he lost the seat to his predecessor Kimondo.

== Personal life ==
Kirima had 3 wives, He is estimated to have had 12 children

== Death ==
Diabetic and partially blind, Gerishon Kirima died on 28 December 2010 while undergoing treatment in South Africa. He was 80 years old.
