= Samuel Kamau Macharia =

Kenyan business executive (born 1941)

- Born: 1942 (age 83–84); Ndakaini Village, Murang'a County, Kenya
- Education: Embu College
- Occupation: Businessman
- Known for: Founder and chairperson of Royal Media Services, the parent company of Citizen TV

Samuel Kamau Macharia (born 1942), also known as S.K. Macharia, is a Kenyan entrepreneur and media proprietor who serves as the founder and chairman of Royal Media Services, one of Kenya's largest private radio and television networks, with flagship outlets including Citizen TV and Radio Citizen.

In a 2012 feature, Forbes Africa described Macharia as "Africa’s Ted Turner," referencing his impact on the region's media industry through Royal Media Services.
He was also honoured with the 2015 Eastern Africa Ernst and Young Entrepreneur Lifetime Achievement Award.

== Early life and education ==
Samuel Kamau Macharia was born in 1942 in Ndakaini Village, Murang'a County, Kenya, as the second of four children in a family working as squatters on British settler plantations under colonial rule. After the death of his mother at age five, Macharia’s father took the family to Arusha, Tanzania, in search of employment. However, unable to find stable work, the family eventually returned to Central Kenya(in present-day Murang’a County) following the outbreak of the Mau Mau uprising in the 1952.

Macharia began his formal education in 1954, enrolling in Standard 1 (equivalent to first grade) at Ndakaini Primary School. He continued his primary education at Gituru Intermediate School, where he sat for the Kenya African Preliminary Examination (KAPE), an entrance exam used during the colonial era for progression to secondary school, in 1958.

After completing his intermediate schooling and working briefly as a primary school teacher, he joined Kahuhia Teachers’ Training College in 1961. He later received a scholarship through the J.F. Kennedy–Tom Mboya airlift program(a U.S.-sponsored initiative that brought East African students to American colleges in the early 1960s), traveled to the United States in 1962, and completed high school at Seattle Technical College.

Following secondary education, Macharia pursued higher degrees in the U.S., graduating from Seattle Pacific University with a B.A. in Political Science, earning a B.Sc. in Accounting from the University of Washington, and obtaining M.Sc. and M.A. degrees in Accounting/Finance. He also became a Certified Public Accountant (CPA) before returning to Kenya in 1969.

He later enrolled at Embu College in 1965, completing a Diploma in Business Management, Sales, and Marketing by 1967.

== Career ==
After returning to Kenya in 1969, Macharia worked as a provincial local government finance officer in the Ministry of Local Government. He later held positions at the Industrial and Commercial Development Corporation (ICDC) and Kenya Industrial Estates (KIE).

After completing his studies in the United States, Macharia briefly worked as a financial analyst for the World Bank in 1970, prior to returning to Kenya to take up various roles in the public and private sectors.

In 1973, he was appointed head of a task force charged with auditing and later liquidating the Agricultural Development Corporation.

=== Madhupaper ===
In 1979, Macharia resigned from public service to focus on Madhupaper International Kenya Limited, a tissue manufacturing company he had founded in 1976. The company produced the "Rosy" brand of tissue paper and, by 1985, was the only tissue manufacturer in Kenya, employing approximately 300 people. It was placed under receivership on 25 October 1985, by Kenya Commercial Bank.

=== Royal Media Services ===
Macharia founded Royal Media Services (RMS) in the late 1990s, initially with modest resources. Frustrated by limited access to the state-controlled media space, he established RMS to provide independent broadcasting alternatives in Kenya. Over time, the company grew into one of the largest private media houses in East Africa, owning Citizen TV—the most-watched television channel in Kenya—as well as over 14 radio stations broadcasting in multiple local languages.

Macharia advocated for the broadcasting of content in Kiswahili and vernacular languages, aiming to reach rural audiences and promote local storytelling. This focus on accessibility and cultural relevance became a hallmark of RMS's programming.

Despite its success, RMS faced legal and regulatory challenges, including attempts by authorities to shut it down in the early years of its operation. Macharia pursued several court battles to defend the company’s broadcasting licenses and independence.

As of 2016, the international research firm Ipsos reported that Citizen TV held a 62.5% share of the Kenyan television market. Royal Media Services’ radio stations reached approximately 80% of Kenya's population, with Radio Citizen alone accounting for 43% of the radio market share.

== Personal life ==
Macharia is married to Purity Gathoni Macharia, and together they have six children, four sons and two daughters. His wife, Gathoni, is noted for her support throughout his professional and academic journey, especially during their years abroad. The family’s life abroad began in the 1960s when they relocated to the United States for his higher education. While in the U.S., Macharia balanced family responsibilities with full-time work and evening studies, often working double shifts to support both his household and academic pursuits. Gathoni is the sister of Njeru Githae, a former Kenyan Cabinet Minister.

== Awards ==
- 2015 Eastern Africa Ernst & Young Entrepreneur Lifetime Award
- Honorary Doctorate, University of Nairobi

== See also ==
- Robinson Njeru Githae
- Citizen TV
- University of Nairobi
- University of Washington
