= Wilfred Kiboro =

Wilfred Kìboro EBS
- Born: Wilfred David Kìboro; 7 August 1944 (age 82); Kenya Province, Colony of Kenya
- Education: University of Nairobi
- Occupations: Entrepreneur, civil engineer
- Spouse: Fatuma Kiboro

Wilfred David Kìboro, EBS (pronounced [kiˈbɔːro]; born 7 August 1944) is a Kenyan entrepreneur, philanthropist and golfer. He is best known for having been the group CEO of the Nation Media Group. Kìboro is a highly respected personality in the media and business industries in Kenya. He was born in the Kenya Province of the Colony of Kenya, now Kiambu County in the former Central Province.

Kìboro has won two very significant awards: the Elder of the Order of the Burning Spear and the Leadership Shines Through – Africa award.

== Career ==
=== Shell International ===
After receiving his bachelor's degree in civil engineering from the University of Nairobi, Kìboro began his career as a technical sales engineer for Shell International, and was soon promoted to technical sales manager, in charge of the manufacturing, sales and marketing of industrial and road construction products in the East and Central Africa region.

=== Esso Kenya ===
Kìboro joined Esso Kenya Ltd. in 1974 as a supply, planning and economics manager, where he started gaining both managerial and executive recognition. He gained several positions including personnel director and sales/marketing director.

=== Xerox Kenya ===
He joined Xerox Kenya in 1987 and was appointed as the managing director of the company in 1989. He held this position until he joined the Nation Media Group in 1993.

=== Nation Media Group ===
Kìboro joined Nation Media Group (NMG) in 1993 as the managing director designate of the Nation newspaper. At the time its only two products were the Daily Nation and Taifa Leo (a Kenyan Kiswahili newspaper, meaning "Nation Today").

In line with ongoing regional integration efforts, the NMG launched The East African in 1994, the most successful cross-border newspaper in East Africa, hitting the news-stands of Kenya, Uganda, Tanzania and now Rwanda. Kìboro became the group CEO in 1995 and retained his position until his retirement in 2006.

In 1999, the NMG made their entry into the electronic media industry after many years of frustration due to policy inadequacies and hostility by the then Government of Kenya under Daniel arap Moi. Nation FM and Nation TV were formed that year. Since then, the NMG has developed into a respected conglomerate around East Africa under Kìboro's tenure. It is divided into:

- The Nation Newspapers Division
- The Nation Broadcasting Division
- Nation Carriers Ltd (with Courier)
- Nation Marketing & Publishing
  - Business Directory
  - The Weekly Advertiser
  - Distribution of local and international publications such as The Economist, Time, Newsweek, among others
- East African Magazines
- Monitor Publications Ltd.
- Mwananchi Communications Ltd.

The NMG has also taken advantage of the communications technology explosion to send news to their subscribers, in partnership with Safaricom and Airtel, leading mobile operators in Kenya.

=== International career ===
Kìboro has travelled extensively, holding numerous national, regional and international job assignments that have seen him supervise cross-national teams across continents, a vote of confidence in his abilities as a change manager. He has dedicated his life to serving his country, as evidenced by the record of posts he has held and continues to hold with a view to contributing to Kenya's growth and development.

Internationally, Kìboro is the chairman of the International Press Institute (IPI) in Kenya, the East African Business Summit and a member of the International Who's Who of Professionals. He also sits on the Rhodes Trust in Kenya as honorary chairman, and is a member of the International Organization of Employers' Enterprise Advisory Group. He launched numerous environmental and humanitarian efforts during his tenure at NMG, two key ones being:

- The launching of the Aberdare Forest Fund in 2002
- The launching of the Nation Turkana Relief Fund in 1999/2000

=== Major awards ===
- Elder of the Order of the Burning Spear
- Leadership Shines Through – Africa
- ICT Hall of Fame – 2007 lifetime inductee

== Retirement ==
Kìboro retired as the group CEO of the NMG in 2006, but still works there as the chairman of the board of directors. The NMG labelled him as their 'Mentor, Father, Team Leader and Champion'. His dream for the NMG in the future is that it will diversify its activities to some 12 African countries within the next ten years. He also works as the chairman of Wilfay Investments Limited and serves as a non-executive director of East African Breweries Limited and Standard Chartered Bank Kenya.

== Personal life ==
Kìboro and his wife Fatuma live in Nairobi, Kenya.

== Sources ==
- Profile at The Media Center @ API
- Profile at Bloomberg Businessweek
- Profile at Nation Media Group – Board of Directors
