= Manu Chandaria =

Kenyan businessman of Indian descent

- Born: 1 March 1929 (age 97); Nairobi, Kenya
- Citizenship: Kenya
- Education: Jamnagar India University (BSc); University of Oklahoma (BSc.Eng); University of Oklahoma (MSc.Eng)
- Occupations: Businessman, industrialist, entrepreneur
- Years active: 1951–present
- Known for: Business, Philanthropy
- Awards: Pravasi Bharatiya Samman
- Honours: Elder of the Burning Spear

Manilal Premchand Chandaria OBE CBS EBS (born 1 March 1929) is a Kenyan businessman of Indian descent who was born in Nairobi. He is a senior member of the Comcraft Group of Companies, that trades in about 40 countries, and is on the boards of several prominent East African companies. He has won several awards in East Africa and internationally in recognition of his entrepreneurial endeavours and is also a noted philanthropist. In 2003, Chandaria was awarded the Order of the British Empire (OBE) by Queen Elizabeth II. In December of the same year, he was awarded the Elder of the Burning Spear by former president Mwai Kibaki, one of the highest civilian honours in Kenya. He has been hailed as "one of Kenya's leading industrialists".

== Early life ==
Chandaria's father, an Indian merchant from Saurashtra, Gujarat, moved to Kenya in 1915 to start a provisions shop along Biashara street in Nairobi. He, Chandaria, grew up in the Ngara area of Nairobi in a house that was home to three other families, where he assisted his father in the shop. Chandaria has conceded that while he, "wasn't born with a silver spoon in my mouth, there were at least spoons in the house."

== Education ==
Chandaria attended various schools in Nairobi and Mombasa in Kenya from where he proceeded to India for his undergraduate studies. He graduated from Jamnagar India University, Bombay in 1949 with a Bachelor of Science from whence he proceeded to Oklahoma in the US. He graduated in 1950 with a bachelor in engineering and continued with his Master's, which he obtained in 1951 from the University of Oklahoma. It was from here he returned to Kenya to find a prospering family enterprise and thus a platform where he would apply his swift business acumen to wrest a multinational conglomerate from the provisional shop that had once been.

== Business ==
Shortly before Chandaria and his brother's return to Kenya, their family had amassed substantial holdings that made it possible for their entry into the lucrative steel and aluminium industry. Chandaria's future father-in-law had organised a group of ten individuals to acquire saucepan manufacturer Kenya Aluminium, an enterprise that had folded during the depression, from an Indian merchant in 1929, although this group eventually broke up to pursue different ventures some twenty years later. Such were the earnest beginnings of the future $2.5 billion Comcraft Group. With the onset of the 1950s and 60s came the expansion of Comcraft to other countries such as Ethiopia, Nigeria, Congo, India, Zambia and elsewhere with Chandaria being charged with business affairs in Uganda, and Congo. He is today a senior member of Comcraft Group, Chairman of Bank of India Advisory Committee in Nairobi among others. His personal business interests are in the Kenyan economy and as well as 50 other countries. In a recent interview for the Creating Emerging Markets project at the Harvard Business School, he defends the notion that businesses should look at profit as the means, and not the end.

== Philanthropy ==
Chandaria is a committed Jain, and in fulfilment of the principles of Jainism his family set up the Chandaria Foundation to further this belief. As Comcraft operates in more than 11 African countries, the Chandaria family has set up charitable trusts in each country to assist in their philanthropic exploits. As the chairman of the Chandaria Foundation he is at the forefront of the charitable work of the family. He is the benefactor of numerous schools and clinics in Kenya and is or has been with involved with more than 25 organisations. Chandaria cites John D. Rockefeller and Henry Ford as the inspiration for his philanthropic streak due to their establishing the Rockefeller Foundation and Ford Foundation respectively.

In 2022, Chandaria was awarded the Carnegie Medal of Philanthropy, in recognition of "innovative philanthropy" and his "contributions to society". That year he and four others were named to receive the prestigious award; (a) Dolly Parton (b) Lyda Hill (c) Lynn Schusterman and (d) Stacy Schusterman. The award ceremony is planned in October 2022 in New York City.

== Peace Maker ==
Chandaria is a member of the Global Leadership Council and the patron and chairman of the Global Peace Foundation in Africa. He has spoken in all Global Peace Festival Conventions since 2010 and played a very crucial role in Kenya's hosting of the Global Peace Convention 2010 which was patronised and officially opened by the 3rd President of the Republic of Kenya Hon. Mwai Kibaki. In 2013, the Global Peace Foundation in Kenya under his chairmanship was nominated for the UN Person of the Year Award for its role in empowering the youth through entrepreneurship and a culture of service. On 7 December 2013, Dr. Chandaria addressed the Global Peace Convention 2013 held at the Shangrilla Hotel in Kuala Lumpur alongside Dr. Hyun Jin Moon who blamed religious fanatics for inter-faith conflicts.

== Personal life ==
Chandaria is married to Aruna with whom he has two children: daughter Priti and son Neal, who works in the family business, and three grandchildren, one of whom is Ayushi. He lives in the Muthaiga neighborhood of Nairobi, Kenya.

== See also ==
- Indian diaspora in East Africa
- List of African millionaires
- List of wealthiest people in Kenya
