= Eddah Gachukia =

Kenyan educator and entrepreneur

- Born: Eddah Gachukia; 13 July 1936 (age 90); Kenya
- Known for: education, entrepreneur and politics
- Title: Co-founder of Riara University

Eddah Wacheke Gachukia (also Eddah Waceke Gachukia; born 13 July 1936) is a Kenyan educationist and entrepreneur. She is a co-founder of the Riara Group of Schools that includes Riara University.

== Early life ==
Eddah was born on 13 July 1936.

== Work and tertiary education ==
After graduating with a diploma in teaching from Makerere University, Eddah joined Thika High School in 1960 and taught for 3 years. She enrolled for a course in language teaching at Leeds University. Subsequently, she was appointed Head of the General Methods Section at the Kenya Institute of Education with a focus on Curriculum Research and Development where she served between 1965 and 1968. She joined the University of Nairobi and graduated with a bachelor's degree in 1971 and a Ph.D. in 1973. She lectured at the University of Nairobi from 1973 to 1987 and obtained a Ph.D. in Literature in 1981.

Between 1993 and 1998, Eddah was the Founding Executive Director of the Forum for African Women Educationalists (FAWE). She was the Chairperson of the African Women's Development and Communication Network (FEMNET) between 1988 and 1992.

Other offices Eddah has held include:

- National Advisor to UNESCO on Population Information and Development Communication for Kenya
- Chairperson of the Board of Governors at the Kenya High School
- Chairperson at Uchumi Supermarkets
- Chairperson at the National Council of Women of Kenya
- Member of the Board at Kenya Airways
- Member of the Board at Nation Newspapers Limited

== Politics ==
Eddah was a Nominated Member of Parliament between 1974 and 1983.

== Riara Group of Schools ==
In 1974, Eddah and her husband took over a small kindergarten in Nairobi. In 1983, the couple founded Riara Primary School. Eddah's husband Daniel left his job at the East African Industries (now known as Unilever Kenya) to launch the primary school business. Today, the Riara Group of Schools operates two kindergartens, two primary schools, a girl’s secondary school and a university in Nairobi. Eddah serves as the Group's Academic Director.

== Personal life ==
Eddah is married to Daniel K. Gachukia, chairman and co-founder of the Riara Group of Schools. They met at the Nairobi Railway Station in 1953 as both attended Makerere University for their diplomas in education. They got married four years later and have four children.

== Awards ==
- Moran of the Burning Spear (MBS) Presidential Award
- Honorary Doctorate from Kenyatta University
