= List of Kenyans =

The following list gives a categorised overview of notable people from Kenya.

== Pre-colonial leaders ==
- Koitalel Arap Samoei
- Mekatilili Wa Menza
- Nabongo Mumia
- Waiyaki Wa Hinga
- Wangu wa Makeri

== Anti-colonial activists ==
- Bildad Kaggia
- Dedan Kimathi
- Dennis Akumu
- Elijah Omolo Agar
- Esau Khamati Oriedo
- Fitz Remedios Santana de Souza
- Fred Kubai
- Harry Thuku
- Jaramogi Oginga Odinga
- John Keen (Kenya politician)
- Jomo Kenyatta
- Joseph Murumbi
- J.M. Kariuki
- Kung'u Karumba
- Makhan Singh (Kenyan trade unionist)
- Martin Shikuku
- Mary Muthoni Nyanjiru
- Masinde Muliro
- Musa Mwariama
- Ochola Ogaye Mak'Anyengo
- Paul Ngei
- Pio Gama Pinto
- Ramogi Achieng Oneko
- Stanley Mathenge
- Tom Mboya
- Wambui Otieno
- Waruhiu Itote

== Politicians ==
- Moody Awori, Vice President, August, 2003–December 2007
- Nicholas Biwott, Member of Parliament, former Cabinet Minister
- Cyrus Jirongo
- Josephat Karanja, Vice President 1988–1989
- J. M. Kariuki, assassinated 1975
- Uhuru Kenyatta, son of the first President, Jomo Kenyatta and 4th President of Kenya, 2013–2022
- Mwai Kibaki, third President of Kenya December 2002 – March 2013
- Esau Khamati Oriedo, first served in the District House Assembly the Local Native Council (LNC) of North Nyanza; original member of KAU progenitor to KANU.
- Michael Wamalwa Kijana, Vice President 3 January 2003 – August 2003
- Catherine Omanyo, Member of Parliament and school founder
- Ochola Ogaye Mak'Anyengo, Member of Parliament, Assistant Cabinet Minister
- John Mwirichia
- Tom Mboya, Cabinet Minister, assassinated 1969
- Kenneth Matiba
- Musalia Mudavadi, Vice President 4 November 2002 – 30 December 2002
- Joseph Murumbi, Vice President 1965–1967
- Simeon Nyachae
- Daisy Nyongesa (born 1989), senator
- Charity Ngilu, first female to run for presidency
- Raila Odinga, former Cabinet Minister, Member of Parliament. Son of Oginga Odinga and former Prime Minister
- Quincy Timberlake, President, Platinum Centraliser and Unionist Party of Kenya
- Appolo Ohanga
- James Orengo
- Robert Ouko, Cabinet Minister, assassinated 1990
- Pio Gama Pinto, assassinated 1965
- Charles Rubia
- George Saitoti, Vice President May 1989 – Dec 1997, April 1999 – 30 August 2002
- Makhan Singh, freedom fighter
- Fitz R S de Souza, Member of Parliament and Deputy Speaker 1963–1970
- Kalonzo Musyoka, Vice President Jan 2008 – March 2013
- William Ruto, Deputy Vice-President April 2013–2022, President April 2023-present
- Martha Karua
- John Michuki
- Njenga Karume
- Jeremiah Nyagah, long-serving cabinet minister and member of Parliament
- Mutahi Kagwe, former Member of Parliament, former Senator and former Cabinet Secretary.
- Harry Thuku
- Koigi Wa Wamwere
- Martin Nyaga Wambora, first Governor of Embu, former chairman of Kenya Airports Authority, successful Runyenjes MP and noted former Kenyan trade secretary
- Samuel Kivuitu, Electoral Commissioner of Kenya (2013)
- Fred Matiang'i
- Prof. Crispus Makau Kiamba, Permanent Secretary in the Ministry of Higher Education, Science and Technology, Government of Kenya from 2008 to 2013.

== Activists ==
- Auma Obama – Kenyan-British activist, journalist and author
- Boniface Mwangi – Kenyan activist, photojournalist
- Esau Khamati Oriedo
- Samwel Mohochi, human rights lawyer
- Ciiru Waithaka CEO of Funkidz
- Eric Njuguna, climate activist
- Hamisa Zaja, Peace and disabilities
- John Githongo, a prominent Kenyan anti-corruption activist and public figure
- Maina Kiai, Kenyan lawyer and human rights activist. Human Rights Watch Former UN Special Rapporteur on the rights to freedom of peaceful assembly and of association. Awarded House's Freedom Award (2014), United Nations Foundation's Leo Nevas Award (2016), AFL-CIO George Meany-Lane Kirkland Human Rights Award (2016).
- Marylize Biubwa, intersectional feminist and activist
- Mshai Mwangola
- Esther Mwikali, land rights activist

== Civil servants ==
- Alice Wairimu Nderitu
- Stanley Kamang Nganga
- Edward H Ntalami
- Margaret Nyakang'o
- Barack Obama Sr.
- Chris Kirubi
- Muthui Kariuki
- Immaculate Wambua, diplomat

== Academics, scientists and medical professionals ==
- Ali Mazrui
- Amina Abubakar
- Bethwell Allan Ogot
- Borna Nyaoke-Anoke
- Calestous Juma
- Charity Wayua
- Paula Kahumbu
- Davy Kiprotich Koech
- Dorothy Wanja Nyingi
- Elizabeth Gitau
- Esther Ngumbi
- Evelyn Gitau
- Fardosa Ahmed
- Gladys Ngetich
- Hope Mwanake
- Jemimah Kariuki, doctor
- Louise Leakey
- Richard Leakey
- Juliet Obanda Makanga
- Leah Marangu
- Maina wa Kinyatti
- Margaret Ogola
- Mary Abukutsa-Onyango
- Moses Rugut
- Mshai Mwangola
- Ngũgĩ wa Thiong'o
- Ng'endo Mwangi
- Njoki Wamai
- Peter Amollo Odhiambo
- Phoebe Okowa
- Reuben Olembo
- Miriam Were
- Stellah Wairimu Bosire-Otieno
- Steven Runo
- Teresia Mbaika Malokwe
- Thomas R. Odhiambo
- Washington Yotto Ochieng
- Winnie Apiyo
- Teresa Akenga

== Religious leaders ==
- Cardinal John Njue
- Cardinal Maurice Michael Otunga
- Archbishop John Njenga
- Judy Mbugua (born 1947), chair of the Pan African Christian Women Alliance

== Business people and entrepreneurs ==
- Benson Wairegi
- Chris Kirubi
- Eric Kinoti
- Esther Muchemi
- Isis Nyong'o
- James Mwangi
- James Mworia
- Jamila Abbas
- Mark Kaigwa
- Mubarak Muyika
- Muhoho Kenyatta
- Njeri Rionge
- Peter Ndegwa
- Pradeep Paunrana
- Rosemary Odinga
- Samuel Kamau Macharia
- Sauda Rajab
- Susan Oguya
- Trushar Khetia
- Wilfred Musau

== Sports persons ==
- Elisha Barno (born 1985), distance runner
- Matthew Birir
- Amos Biwott
- Mike Boit
- Richard Chelimo
- Lonah Chemtai Salpeter, Kenyan-Israeli Olympic marathon runner
- Joyce Chepchumba
- Jason Dunford (born 1986), Olympic swimmer, media personality, rapper and entrepreneur
- Paul Ereng
- Chris Froome
- John Rugoiyo Gichuki
- Mercy Wanjiru Gitahi, athletics competitor in the steeplechase
- Mbarak Hussein, born in Kenya in 1965, now a U.S. citizen, long-distance runner,
- Ben Jipcho
- Pauline Njeri Kahenya (born 1985), long-distance runner
- Julius Kariuki
- Kipchoge Keino
- Ezekiel Kemboi
- Joseph Keter
- Eliud Kipchoge (born 1984), marathon world record holder
- Wilson Kipketer (born 1972), born and raised in Kenya, now a citizen of Denmark
- Wilson Boit Kipketer
- Moses Kiptanui
- Sally Kipyego, All American runner for Texas Tech University
- Ismael Kirui
- Samson Kitur
- Daniel Komen
- Julius Korir
- Paul Korir
- Reuben Kosgei
- Bernard Lagat
- Tegla Loroupe
- Edith Masai
- Shekhar Mehta, rally driver
- Catherine Ndereba (born 1972), marathon runner
- Noah Ngeny
- John Ngugi
- Margaret Okayo (born 1976), marathon runner
- Dennis Oliech (born 1985), soccer player
- Yobes Ondieki
- Dominic Ondoro, distance runner
- Nuni Omot (born 1994), basketball player in the Israeli Basketball Premier League
- Henry Rono
- Peter Rono
- David Rudisha
- Moses Tanui
- William Tanui
- Naftali Temu
- Paul Tergat
- Steve Tikolo, widely regarded in cricket as the best batsman outside of the test playing nations
- Robert Wangila, boxer
- McDonald Mariga, soccer player now based in Italy, plays for Serie A club Internazionale
- Victor Wanyama, soccer player now based in America, plays for Vancouver Whitecaps in the country's top flight soccer league "Major league Soccer "and captains the Kenya national team
- Biko Adema, national rugby team player
- Djed Spence, soccer player now based in England, plays for English Premier League Team Tottenham Hotspur

== Environmentalists and conservationists ==
- Elizabeth Wathuti
- George Adamson
- Helen Gichohi
- Ikal Angelei
- Joy Adamson
- Daphne Sheldrick
- Phyllis Omido
- Saba Douglas-Hamilton
- Wangari Maathai
- Wanjira Mathai

== Musicians ==
- Timothy "Ennovator" Rimbui
- Eric Wainaina
- Fena Gitu
- Juacali
- Jimw@t
- Otile Brown
- Nyashinski
- Sauti Sol
- Elani
- Henrie Mutuku
- Naiboi
- Enock Ondego
- Sanaipei Tande
- Size 8
- Gloria Muliro
- Mbuvi
- Nameless
- PinkPantheress
- Wakadinali
- Amani Gracious

== Writers and playwrights ==
- Asenath Bole Odaga
- Binyavanga Wainaina
- Chacha Nyaigotti-Chacha
- Charity Waciuma
- Charles Mangua
- Clifton Gachagua
- Grace Ogot
- Hazel de Silva Mugot
- Iman Verjee
- Khadambi Asalache
- Kinyanjui Kombani
- Koigi wa Wamwere
- Kuki Gallmann
- Makena Onjerika
- Margaret Ogola
- Marjorie Oludhe Macgoye
- Meja Mwangi
- Micere Githae Mugo
- Moraa Gitaa
- Mshai Mwangola
- Mũkoma wa Ngũgĩ
- Mwangi Ruheni
- Nanjala Nyabola,
- Ngugi wa Mirii
- Ngugi Wa Thiong'o
- Rocha Chimera
- Shailja Patel
- Tony Mochama
- Wangui wa Goro
- Yvonne Adhiambo Owuor

== Journalists, bloggers and media personalities ==
- Brenda Wambui
- Catherine Kasavuli
- Cyprian Nyakundi
- Farida Karoney
- Hilary Ng'weno
- Janet Mbugua
- Jeff Koinange
- Julie Gichuru
- Kui Kinyanjui
- Linus Kaikai
- Mwenda Njoka
- Ory Okolloh
- Ijeoma Onyeator
- Pamella Makotsi-Sittani
- Patrick Gathara
- Priya Ramrakha
- Robert Alai
- Xtian Dela
- Zain Verjee
- Idah Waringa
- Leonard Mbotela

== Actors and actresses ==
- Avril (singer)
- Khaleed Abdul
- Charles Gitonga Maina
- Christopher Okinda
- Eddy Kimani
- Edi Gathegi
- Edwin Mahinda
- John Sibi-Okumu
- Joseph Olita
- Kiran Shah
- Lupita Nyong'o
- Maqbul Mohammed
- Nana Gichuru
- Nini Wacera
- Oliver Litondo
- Patricia Kihoro
- Jackie Nyaminde
- Paul Onsongo
- Raymond Ofula
- Sarah Hassan
- Sidede Onyulo
- Deep Roy
- Kenneth Ambani

== See also ==
- List of Kenyan artists
- List of writers from Kenya
