= Gitau =

Gitau is a surname. Notable people with the surname include:

- Elizabeth Gitau (born 1988), Kenyan physician, businesswoman and corporate executive
- Faith Gitau, Kenyan politician
- Paul Gitau, Kenyan volleyball coach
- Peter Njuguna Gitau (born 1962), Kenyan politician
- Shikoh Gitau (born c. 1981), Kenyan computer scientist
- William Gitau (born 1961), Kenyan politician
