= Friends of Lake Turkana =

Friends of Lake Turkana (FoLT) is a nonprofit organization in Kenya that was founded in 2007 by Kenyan environmentalist Ikal Angelei. The organization has worked to stop the construction of the Ethiopian Gilgel Gibe III Dam on the Omo River, Lake Turkana's primary source of water. Due to FoLT and other partner's advocacy work on saving Lake Turkana, the Lake was added to the list of world Heritage sites in Danger by UNESSCO in June 2018.

Angelei continues to advocate for the sovereignty of local people to work for development that is sustainable.

== Structure ==
Friends of Lake Turkana is located off Lodwar-Kalakol road in Turkana County, Kenya. The organization serves the communities living around the Lake Turkana Basin, The Turkana, Rendile, Borana, Galla, Elmolo, Burji and the Dasanach. Some of FoLT key partners are Ford Foundation, FAO and Kenya Market Trust. FoLT focuses her operations on four key areas, Extractives Governance, environmental justice, Policy Advocacy and Women and Youth.

== Extractives Governance ==
FoLT works towards maximizing community inclusion and benefits in the oil and minerals developments in Turkana by increasing debate on adoption of Free Prior and Informed Consent (FPIC) in extractives and infrastructural development

== Environmental Justice ==
FoLT focuses on increasing community understanding of the linkages between environmental impacts and livelihoods to demand appropriate accountability as well as researching and documenting possible climate impacts related to extractives development.

== Policy Advocacy ==
FoLT works to ensure increased capacity to represent community interests in the extractives and development agenda within the community and Increase the use of research and evidence based data to inform changes in policy implementation to ensure public resources are used transparently and can be accounted for

== Youth & Women Engagements ==
FoLT advocates for the recognition of youth and women and other marginalized groups as key agents of change by ensuring their increased participation in decision making processes and demanding of accountability.

== Gilgel Gibe Dams ==
Lake Turkana, in Northern Kenya, is a part of the 70,000-square-kilometer Turkana Basin, and is the most saline lake in east Africa. Because the Omo River provides Lake Turkana with 90% of its water, the planned Gilgel Gibe III Dam would lower the lake's water levels by 5–12 meters, changing its environment, chemistry, shoreline and ecology. This would also disrupt local economic practices including fishing, pastoralism and agricultural production.

The dam site is 160 kilometers north of Lake Turkana, in the Lower Omo Valley. Dam construction began in 2006. FoLT has stated that the Gibe III dam will destroy important components of Lake Turkana's ecology, and the economy it provides for local people. FoLT has estimated that 200,000 people or more, belonging to eight ethnic groups, rely upon the lake for their sustenance.

Friends of Lake Turkana has made efforts to increase awareness about the construction of the Gibe III Dam and its potential impact on Lake Turkana among local Turkana people. As a result of FoLT's activities, the World Bank, the European Investment Bank and the African Development Bank chose to cancel their funding of Gibe III.

The organization has advocated for responsible ecological practices for further planned dams in Ethiopia.

== Oil ==
The director of FoLT, Angelei, has stated that Tullow Oil's exploration projects in Turkana have used large quantities of water, threatening local communities' scarce water resources.

== See also ==
- Habitat destruction
