= Office of the Controller of Budget (Kenya) =

The Office of Controller of Budget of Kenya is an Independent Office established under Article 228 of The Constitution of Kenya with the core mandate being to oversee implementation of the budgets of the National and County Governments by authorising withdrawal from public funds.

== Roles ==
The roles and functions of the office of the Controller of Budget as stipulated in the Constitution are as follows:

=== Oversight ===
This role involves overseeing the implementation of the budgets of both national and county governments. The Controller of Budget in this role therefore monitors the use of public funds in-year and reports to Parliament on how the funds have been utilised.

=== Controlling role ===
The controlling function involves authorising withdrawals from public funds. Before authorising any withdrawal from Public funds, the Controller of Budget must first be satisfied that the said withdrawal is authorised by law, as per Article 228 (5) of the Constitution. Public funds include: -

==== Consolidated Fund ====
It is into the consolidated fund that all money raised or received by or on behalf of the national government is paid. This is the fund that keeps the national government and the county government running. The Controller of Budget is mandated under Article 206 (4) of the Constitution of Kenya to ensure that the fund is utilised on accordance with the law.

==== County Revenue Fund ====
This is the fund into which all money raised or received by or on behalf of the county government is paid including money raised from property rates, entertainment taxes, levies, fees, charges, etc. ( Article 207 (1) ). Article 207 (3) of the Constitution of Kenya states that the Controller of Budget has the sole mandate and/or power to approve any withdrawal from a Revenue Fund.

==== Equalisation Fund ====
The fund will be used by the national government to provide basic services including water, roads, health facilities and electricity to the marginalized areas so as to bring the quality of services in those areas to the same level as generally enjoyed by the rest of the nation. This fund was created by Article 204 (1) of the Constitution of Kenya.

=== Reporting role ===
This role entails the preparation of quarterly, annual and special reports to the legislature and executive on budget implementation matters of the national and county governments as provided by law according to (Article 228 (6))

Type of Reports include but not limited to:

- Quarterly Reports on Budget Implementation to the Executive and Parliament Article 228 (6)
- Annual Reports on Budget Implementation to the President and Parliament Article 254 (1)
- Special Reports to the President and Parliament Article 254 (2), investigation reports (Article 254 (2)) and reports on stoppage of funds for governments units as per Article 225 of the Constitution
- Arbitration/Mediation Reports to Parliament on matters relating to Budget Implementation Article 225 (7a) Article 252 (1a&1b).
- Performance reports for the activities of Office of Controller of Budget
- And any other report on Budget implementation that may be required.

To ensure transparency all the reports must be published and publicized as per Article 254 (3) which states that “Every report required from a commission or holder of an independent office under this Article shall be published and publicized”.

=== Advisory role ===
This function involves giving advice to Parliament on financial matters where a Cabinet Secretary has stopped transfer of funds to a State organ or public entity. The suspension of funds cannot be lifted or sustained before the Controller of Budget gives a report to Parliament.

The Office of the Controller of Budget is expected to investigate the matter the financial performance of a State organ or entity after which prepare and present a report on the matter to Parliament which will be used to approve or renew the decision to stop transfer of funds to a State organ or public entity as provided for under Article 225 (7) of the Constitution. The Controller of Budget also gives advice to government entities on improving budget implementation e.g. low absorption of funds by Ministries, Departments and Agencies and County entity. This therefore promotes accountability in the use of public financial resources.

=== Investigation role ===
Under Article 252 (1) (a) of the Constitution, the Controller of Budget (independent office) has power to conduct investigations on its own initiative or following a complaint made by a member of the public on budget implementation matters.

=== Arbitration/Mediation role ===
The Controller of Budget under Article 252(1) (b) of the Constitution has powers for conciliation, mediation and negotiation. The Mediation role may involve resolution of conflicts between the national government and the county government, or between county governments with respect to budget implementation. This role involves conducting alternative dispute resolution mechanisms to resolve disputes relating to budget implementation..

== Controller of Budget ==
The current Controller of Budget is Margaret Nyakang’o.

== Auditor-General ==
The Auditor-General may play the Controller of Budget's role until his/her appointment
