= Fardosa Ahmed =

Kenyan physician

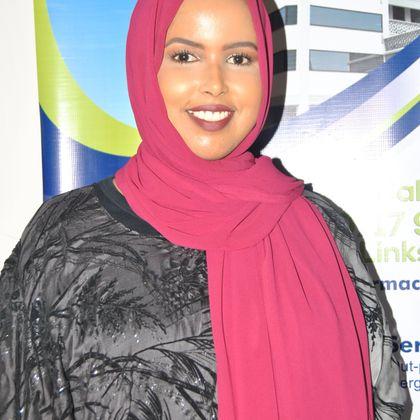
- Born: 1984 (age 41–42); Nairobi, Kenya
- Education: University of Nairobi (Bachelor of Medicine and Bachelor of Surgery) (Postgraduate Diploma in Healthcare Management)
- Occupations: Physician and Health Administrator
- Years active: 2016—
- Title: CEO of Premier Hospital, Mombasa

Fardosa Ahmed (born c. 1985) is a Kenyan physician, businesswoman, and health administrator, who is the chief executive officer of Premier Hospital in Mombasa, a private health facility that she co-founded and co-owns.

== Background and education ==
Ahmed was born in Nairobi, the largest city in Kenya c. 1985. She attended Makini Primary School, in Nairobi, Kenya's capital city. She then transferred to Loreto Convent Valley Road School, also in Nairobi, where she graduated with a High School Diploma. She was then admitted to the University of Nairobi, where she studied human medicine, graduating with a Bachelor of Medicine and Bachelor of Surgery degree. Later, she obtained a Postgraduate Diploma in Healthcare Management.

== Career ==
After her one-year internship, she relocated to the city of Mombasa, where she owned a piece of land in the suburb of Nyali. Using her own funds and money sourced from like-minded people, Dr Ahmed erected an eight-story commercial building on the land that she owned. Initially the intent was to build an office complex. Plans were changed later and Premier Hospital, Mombasa was created.

Premier Hospital is a private, for-profit, tertiary care health facility, with bed-capacity of 70, as of June 2019. Opened on 24 November 2017, the hospital employs over 200 staff and has a pediatric outpatient centre, a surgical suite, a cardiac suite, an orthopedics suite, a gynecology suite, an oncology suite, a dialysis centre, an outpatient chemotherapy suite and an endoscopy suite.

== Other considerations ==
In September 2018, Business Daily Africa, a Kenyan, English language, daily newspaper, named Fadosa Ahmed, among the "Top 40 Under 40 Women in Kenya in 2018".

== See also ==
- Gladys Ngetich
- Charity Wayua
- Juliet Obanda Makanga

== See also ==
- Website of Premier Hospital
- Why Kenya must invest in human capital
