= Mwenda Njoka =

Kenyan journalist

- Occupation: Journalist

Mwenda Njoka is a Kenyan investigative journalist and winner of CNN Journalist of the Year Award. He was one of the seventeen finalists of the 2004 CNN African Journalist of the Year Competition Launched under Sunday Nation/Daily Nation of Kenya in 2004. He is also winner of Kalasha Film & TV Award for his work on the documentary on the late JM Kariuki, a populist Kenyan legislator assassinated under mysterious circumstances in 1975. Njoka is also the founder of non-profit media development organization; Africa Centre for Investigative Journalism (ACIJ). Currently working with Royal Media Services and is behind the Citizen TV Sunday Live news program "Who Owns Kenya". He has previously worked with the Standard Newspapers where he won the 2003 Journalist of the Year award under the auspices of Kenya Union of Journalists, Nation Media Group.
