= Kabissa =

Defunct American non-governmental organization providing internet services to Africa

Kabissa Inc
- Formation: 1999
- Founder: Tobias Eigen
- Dissolved: 2018
- Type: 501(c)(3) Non-profit
- Purpose: Internet Communication Technology
- Location: Bainbridge Island, Washington, United States
- Region served: African Civil Society Organizations
- Services: Providing Internet and communications technology
- Key people: Tobias Eigen
- Website: www.kabissa.org

Kabissa was an American volunteer-led non-governmental organization that promoted Information and Communication Technology (ICT) and Civil Society Organizations (CSO) for positive change in Africa. It operated between 1999 and 2018.

Kabissa members were active throughout Africa, working on a range of tasks including Advocacy and Policy, Arts, Culture, Conflict Resolution, Humanitarian Services, Economic Development, Poverty Reduction, Education, Environment, Gender, Governance, Health, Human Rights, Democracy, Media, Journalism, Microfinance, Technology, Training, Capacity Building and density of space.

Kabissa headquarters were on Bainbridge Island, Washington (state), although the organization operated mostly online, with international contributors. The founder of the organization was Tobias Eigen who led Kabissa together with Kimberly Lowery from 2002 to 2007.

Kabissa, meaning complete in Swahili, helped African civil society organizations put Internet and Communications Technology (ICT) to work for the benefit of their communities. Founded in 1999 by Tobias Eigen, Kabissa initially provided domain hosting services, then capacity-building through a custom training curriculum and manual.

== History ==
Kabissa was founded with the idea that Internet and Communications Technology (ICT) could revolutionize the work of African civil society. Building on the years of consulting experience Tobias Eigen had with African civil society, Kabissa began by providing African organizations with accessible, affordable, and secure internet services.

During the next three years Kabissa showed strong growth and gained increasing recognition. In June 2002 Kabissa won the ICT Stories Competition, an initiative of infoDev and the International Institute of Communication and Development (IICD) which sought to capture the learning process that accompanies the introduction and implementation of ICTs for development.

In September 2002 Kabissa added a part-time Program Manager, Kim Lowery, to its staff. By November 2002 Kabissa was awarded its first major grant from the German Agency for Technical Cooperation (GTZ) for the pilot phase of Kabissa’s Time To Get Online training initiative. They went on to set up an office at Dupont Circle in Washington DC where for the next five years three employees and dozens of interns and volunteers worked on its programs with funding from major foundations including the Ford Foundation, Open Society Institute Information Program, the Hurford Foundation, National Endowment for Democracy, Yahoo Employee Foundation, and Lonely Planet Foundation (now Planet Wheeler Foundation).

They also trained hundreds of activists and development practitioners in end user and training of trainers workshops and distributed thousands of copies of the Time To Get Online manual. In partnership with Tanmia in Morocco, the Time To Get Online manual and training program was localized into French and Arabic.

From April 2005 through March 2008, Kabissa administered the PanAfrican Localisation Project, which was funded by the International Development Research Centre of Canada.

In 2007, Kabissa followed its founder, Tobias Eigen, to Bainbridge Island, WA, and became a volunteer organization with no employees. In 2009, Kabissa announced a new focus on social media in Africa. At the same time, Kabissa streamlined its internet services and shut down the server hosting websites for its member organizations.

As of May, 2010 Kabissa had 1504 member organizations representing over 50 African countries, and included internationally renowned human rights groups, charities, development organizations and orphanages.

The organization was closed in 2018. The founder wrote:

I had the privilege to work with and learn from during the various stages of Kabissa’s evolution as an organization. We did great things, and helped many organizations throughout Africa to gain access to valuable online services and figure out how to use them.

— Tobias Eigen, The Kabissa Legacy letter 2019

== Membership ==
Anyone interested in Africa could create a free account, subscribe to newsletters and participate in groups. Nearly everyone in the Kabissa network was involved in organizations working on the continent that are listed in the Kabissa Organization Directory and displayed on the Kabissa Map.

== Board of Directors ==
Former Board members included:

- John Githongo, Kenya
- Neema Mgana, Tanzania
- Tobias Eigen, Germany/USA
- George Scharffenberger, USA
- Jeff Thindwa, Malawi
- Firoze Manji, Kenya
- Kimberly Lowery, USA
- Peter Eigen, Germany
- Daniel Ritchie, USA

== Affiliations ==
- Aid for Africa Foundation
- Global Washington
