= Loreto High School, Limuru =

School in Kenya

Loreto High School Limuru is an all girls' National School located in the highlands of Limuru, Kiambu County, Central Kenya. It is approximately 28 kilometres (17 mi) from the capital city of Nairobi, Kenya.

== History ==
On 4 December 1936, Loreto Limuru High School opened its doors to its first students. The school founders were the Sisters of Loreto, who came from Ireland to Kenya in 1921 as Catholic missionaries to improve educational opportunity for girls. The vision of the school's founders was to educate African girls who were denied an academic education. The founders were sisters S.M. Dolores Stafford, S.M. Theresa Joseph O'Sullivan and S.M. Veronica Bradley. The Loreto Sisters believe that with education "Women in time to come would do much". They began with seven girls but they left because of the cold and mist. The girls returned and in 1938 four girls took the Primary Examination and began their Teacher Training course.

The first secondary class began in 1947. The first two students, Mary Sekunda Wanjiru and Merioth Wairimu, passed the Senior Cambridge Certificate Examination.

In 1956, a double stream was admitted. There were between 20 and 26 girls per class. In 1958, Loreto was categorized as a National School. In 1970, Loreto began an "A level" art class, and in 1981 the school had an "A level" science stream, with a science laboratory.

In 1986, Kenya introduced the 8-4-4 Curriculum in Kenya. Loreto begant a third stream, bringing the number of students to over 500.

In 1996, the school celebrated its 60th anniversary where the President of Kenya attended the occasion as the chief guest.

In 2011, the school introduced a fifth stream. In 2002 the school hed 800 students, over 45 teaching staff, and over 50 support staff.

== Coordinates and altitude ==
- Latitude: -1.1210124,
- Longitude: 36.6569533
- Altitude: 2,227 metres

== Sponsorship and institutionalism ==
The school is sponsored by the Roman Catholic Archdiocese of Nairobi, a religious organization. The School institution type is classified as ordinary.

== Loreto spirit ==
- "Cruci dum spiro fido"- "In the Cross, while I breathe, I trust.
- "Maria Regina Angelorum" – "Mary, Queen of Angels"

== Motto ==
"United in Love and Peace with good education."

== Academic performance (KCSE) ==
- 1991: mean of 7.5, no As
- 1993: B− mean grade of 8.21, 2 As
- 1997: B mean grade of 9.27, 3As
- 2006: Mean grade above 10 points
- 2007: Mean grade of above 10 points – this has been the school's best performance to date. It was ranked as the third-best school in Kenya, and best girls' school in the country in the 2007 Kenya Certificate of Secondary Education examinations.
- 2010: mean grade of 10.062
- 2011: mean grade of 10.113, 28 As, 50 A-s, 150/177 students got direct admission to public universities
- 2012: B+ mean grade of 10.489. 33 As, 79 A-s
- 2013: B+ mean grade of 10.32. 41 As, 58 A-s
- 2014: B+ mean grade of 10.04. 34 As, 71 A-s
- 2015: B+ mean grade of 10.344. 39 As, 91 A-s

== Notable alumni ==
- Wangari Maathai, 2004 Nobel Peace Prize laureate
- Wanjiku Kabira, academic and author
- Martha Mbugua, lawyer
- Ng'endo Mwangi, first female physician in Kenya
- Carole Wainaina, United Nations official
- Henrie Mutuku, Kenyan Gospel Singer
- Eunice Muringo Kiereini, first African president of the International Council of Nurses

== See also ==
- Education in Kenya
- List of schools in Kenya
- Roman Catholicism
- Single-sex education
