= Winnie Apiyo =

Kenyan electrical engineer

Winnie Adhiambo Apiyo
- Born: 1987 (age 38–39); Kenya
- Education: Tver State University (Bachelor of Engineering in Electrical Engineering); Undisclosed University in Iceland (Postgraduate Diploma in Geothermal Technology); Reykjavik University (Master of Science in Sustainable Energy Engineering) (In progress)
- Occupation: Electrical Engineer
- Title: Protection, Instrumentation and Control Engineer at Kenya Electricity Generating Company

Winnie Adhiambo Apiyo (born c.1987) is a Kenyan electrical engineer who is employed as a Protection, Instrumentation and Control Engineer at Kenya Electricity Generating Company, the largest power producing company in Kenya, the largest economy in the East African Community.

== Background and education ==
Apiyo was born in Kenya, circa 1987. She graduated with a Bachelor of Engineering degree in Electric & Electronic engineering, awarded by Tver State University, in Tver, Russia, in 2010.

She also has a postgraduate diploma in Geothermal Technology, obtained from the Iceland Energy Authority, in collaboration with the United Nations University, following a six-month study program of highly specialized studies in Geothermal technology and management. She was a member of the class of 2016. As of January 2019, she is enrolled in the Iceland School of Energy, at Reykjavik University, pursuing a Master of Science in Sustainable Energy Engineering.

== Career ==
Apiyo serves as an electrical engineer at Kenya Electricity Generating Company. Her specialty in training and work is the planning, testing, and management of geothermal power stations. She has special interest, training and expertise in designing, maintaining and improving these energy infrastructure developments. In her native country of Kenya, she is one of a very small number of female electrical engineers, with special training and expertise in geothermal technology.

== Achievements ==
In September 2018, Business Daily Africa, a Kenyan, English language, daily newspaper, named Winnie Apiyo among the "Top 40 Under 40 Women in Kenya in 2018".

In December 2017, Ms Apiyo received the 2017 Women in Energy Innovation Award at the 2nd Annual Women in Energy Conference, held from 13 until 14 December 2017, in Nairobi, Kenya's capital city. The award was in recognition of her work outlined in the attached abstract, named "Automatic Blockage of Grid Energy Back Feed Project".

== See also ==
- Charity Wayua
- Gladys Ngetich
- Cynthia Wandia
