= Juliet Obanda Makanga =

Kenyan medical scientist and researcher

- Born: 19 February 1985 (age 41); Kenya
- Citizenship: Kenya
- Education: Alliance Girls High School (High School Diploma); Tokyo University of Foreign Studies (Japanese Language Course); Kanazawa University (Bachelor of Pharmaceutical Sciences) (MSc in Pharmaceutical Sciences) (PhD in Pharmaceutical Sciences)
- Occupations: Nuroscientist, Academic, Medical Researcher
- Known for: Neuroscience Research

Juliet Obanda Makanga (née Juliet Obanda; born 19 February 1985) is a Kenyan pharmacologist, neuroscientist and medical researcher, who works as a Lecturer in Clinical Pharmacology, at the School of Pharmacy of Kenyatta University, in Kahawa, Nairobi.

== Background and education ==
Juliet Obanda was born in Vihiga County in the south-western part of Kenya, on 19 February 1985. She attended Alliance Girls High School in the town of Kikuyu, in Kiambu County, in the central part of Kenya, where she obtained her High School Diploma, in 2002.

In 2003, she was awarded the Japanese Government Monbukagakusho Scholarship (MEXT Scholarship), to study pharmacy in Japan. She spent her first year in Japan at the Tokyo University of Foreign Studies, where she obtained a certificate of proficiency in the Japanese language.

She then transferred to Kanazawa University in the city of Kanazawa, Japan. She spent the next eleven years at the university's Institute of Medical, Pharmaceutical and Health Sciences, where she graduated with a Bachelor of Pharmaceutical Sciences, in 2008, an MSc in Pharmaceutical Sciences in 2010 and a PhD in Pharmaceutical Sciences in 2015.

== Career ==
While pursuing her doctorate in Japan, between 2010 and 2015, she worked as a teaching assistant and research associate at the College of Pharmaceutical Sciences of Ritsumeikan University, at the Biwako-Kusatsu Campus, in the town of Kusatsu, in Shiga Prefecture, Japan.

Upon her return to Kenya in 2015, she was hired by Kabarak University, in Nakuru, where she served as the founding head of department of pharmacy and was a key figure in the establishment of the university's Bachelor of Pharmacy programme. In October 2017, she transferred to Kenyatta University as a lecturer at their School of Pharmacy.

Her area of research interest is stem cell research. It is her goal to generate a uniquely "Kenyan" stem cell line.

== Other considerations ==
In 2018, Business Daily Africa, a Kenyan daily English newspaper named Makanga, one of the Top 40 Under 40 Kenyan Women for the year 2018. Makanga is a married mother with one daughter, born c. 2011.

== See also ==
- Susane Nabulindo
- Shitsama Nyamweya
- Maureen Kimenye
