= Mshai Mwangola =

Kenyan oraturist and performance scholar

- Other name: Mshaï S. Mwangola
- Citizenship: Kenyan
- Education: Kenyatta University (B.Ed.); University of Melbourne (Master of Creative Arts); Northwestern University (PhD in Performance Studies)
- Occupations: Oraturist, performance scholar, actor, director, activist
- Spouse: John Githongo

Mshai Mwangola (also written Mshaï Mwangola) is a Kenyan oraturist, performance scholar, actor, director, and activist who works at the intersection of storytelling, pedagogy, research, and advocacy for social transformation. In 2023, she was recognised as a Kenyan Hero on Mashujaa Day for her contribution to society by blending creativity with advocacy and research for social change.

== Education ==
Mwangola earned a Bachelor of Education from Kenyatta University, a Master of Creative Arts from the University of Melbourne, and a PhD in Performance Studies from Northwestern University. Her PhD thesis is titled Performing Our Stories, Performing OurSelves.

== Career ==
Mwangola is part of the Tutors & Trainers Team at the African Leadership Centre in Nairobi and serves on the Executive Committee of the Council for the Development of Social Science Research in Africa (CODESRIA). She is a Research and Communication Officer for the African Peacebuilding Hub.

Mwangola is a founding member of the performance-based artivist group The Orature Collective and The Elephant intellectual platform . She is a volunteer with Kenya's National Civic Education Programme (URAIA). In 2012, Mwangola gave a talk at TEDxNairobi titled Reconnecting our past with the future.

== Personal life ==
Mshai Mwangola is married to John Githongo.

== Selected publications ==
- Mwangola, Mshai S. (2017). "Bury My Bones but Keep My Words: The Legacy of the Dirge Singer". In Unlocking Sound and Image Heritage. ICCROM and KIK-IRPA.
- Mwangola, Mshai S. (2008). "Nurturing the Fourth Generation: Defining the Historical Mission for Our Generation". Africa Development, 33(1).
- Mwangola, Mshai S. (2007). "Leaders of Tomorrow? The Youth and Democratisation in Kenya". In Godwin R. Murunga and Shadrack Wanjala Nasong'o (eds.), Kenya: The Struggle for Democracy. Zed Books/CODESRIA.
- Alexander Craft, Renée; Mcneal, Meida; Mwangola, Mshai S.; and Zabriskie, Queen Meccasia E. (2007). "The Quilt: Towards a Twenty-First-Century Black Feminist Ethnography". Performance Research, 12(3): 55–73.
- Mwangola, Mshai S. (2007). "'Justice Be Our Shield and Defender': An Intellectual Property Rights Regime for Africa". Africa Development, 32(1).

== See also ==
- Orature
- List of Kenyans
- Performance studies
- African Leadership Centre
