= Wanjiku Kabira =

Kenyan writer and literature professor

Prof. Wanjikū Mūkabi Kabira
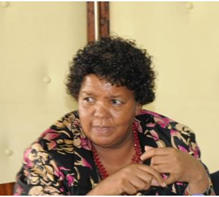

Professor

Personal details
- Born: 15 November 1948 (age 77) Kiambu, Kenya
- Education: Bachelor of Arts in Literature, University of Nairobi Master of Arts in Literature, University of Wisconsin Doctor of Philosophy (PhD) in Literature, University of Nairobi (1994)
- Occupation: Professor Emeritus Literature and African Women Studies; Director, African Women Studies Centre; and author (University of Nairobi)
- Awards: Elder of the Order of the Burning Spear (EBS); Order of the Burning Spear (CBS); Legacy Builders Recognition Award; Shujaa Wa Katiba, 2026

Prof Wanjikū Mūkabi Kabira (EBS), (CBS) (born 15 November 1948) is Professor Emeritus (Literature and African Women Studies) and Director of the African Women Studies Centre at the University of Nairobi, Kenya. She has specialized in the fields of Oral literature, African-American literature, Caribbean literature, and Women's studies. Prof Kabira is been an active involved women/gender advocate constributing intensively towards promotion of women's rights, gender equlity and constitutional reforms. During the Constitution making process in Kenya, she played a key role in briging the women's voices to the constitution making process in Kenya. She has served in various capacities notably as vice-chair in the Kenya Constitutional Review Process (2000–2005), Chair Women's Political Alliance-Kenya (2002–2011), director, Collaborative Center for Gender and Development (1995–2009) and Chair, Department of Literature, University of Nairobi. Kabira is the founding Director of the African Women Studies Centre (AWSC) at the University of Nairobi in June 2011. In 2014, she was awarded the Elder of the Order of the Burning Spear (EBS). She has also been granted the higher award of the Order of the Burning Spear (CBS). In 2015, the Ministry of Devolution and Planning honoured her with the Legacy Builders Recognition Award. Kabira was nominated for the 2024 East Africa Women of Excellence Awards. She was also honoured in the United States for her scholarship and influence in women's rights and gender equality. Recently, Prof.Kabira was recognised as Shujaa wa Katiba by the Kenyan Head of State for her role in Kenya's Constitution Making Process during the 2026 National Katiba Day Celebrations marking 16 years since promulgation of Kenya's Constitution.

== Early life and education ==
Kabira was born in 1948 in present day Lari Constituency. She went to school at Gìthìrioni Primary School and later to Loreto High School, Limuru and Loreto Convent Msongari for her advanced certificate ("A" levels). She studied literature, history and scripture, and received the "Best Performing Student" prize in Literature.

Kabira earned her Bachelor of Arts in literature from the University of Nairobi in 1978. She then pursued advanced studies abroad, obtaining a Master of Arts Degree in Literature from the University of Wisconsin in the United States in 1980. She later earned a Doctor of Philosophy in Literature in 1994 from the University of Nairobi, with a thesis examining 'Images of Women in Gikuyu Oral Literature'.

=== Career ===
Kabira is Emeritus Professor Literature and African Women Studies, and Director of African Women Studies at the University of Nairobi, Kenya. She is a renowned Kenyan scholar and gender specialist. Her scholarly works focus on oral literature, African-American Literature, Caribbean Literature, and women studies. Kabira has held many leadership roles, including vice-chair in the Kenya Constitutional Review Process (2000–2005), Chairperson of the Women's Political Alliance (2002–2011), Director of the Collaborative Center for Gender and Development (1995–2009), Chair in the Department of Literature, and director, African Women Studies Centre at the University of Nairobi. She is the founding Director of African Women Studies Centre at the University of Nairobi, established in June 2011. Kabira ensures that the voices and economic realities of Kenyan women, especially those in rural and informal sectors, influence National policy.

== Work ==
Kabìra is an established author of young adult books. She has published extensively on literature, women, and gender issues. One of her most notable books is A Letter to Mariama Ba (2005), which was a response to So Long a Letter, a book written by Mariama Bâ. Her work with women saw the founding of the African Women Studies Centre at the University of Nairobi in June, 2011. She became the Director of the Centre in 2014 and still serves in that capacity. In her work with the Constitution of Kenya Review Commission she wrote a book, A Time for Harvest: Women and Constitution Making in Kenya (2012), which traces women's journey in the struggle for a new constitution in the past 20 years, beginning from 1992 to 2012. She reminds the 16 women members of parliament(MP) among 290 MPs that their mere presence in Parliament will be fruitless if it not properly used. Other books she has published are Our Mother's Footsteps: Stories of Women in the Mau Mau Struggle for Kenyan Independence (1997), Reclaiming My Dreams: Stories of Wanjira wa Rukenya (2010), The Beaten Track and other personal stories: A collection of short stories (2013), and Changing the Mainstream: Celebrating Women's Resilience (2018).

Other published credits of Kabìra include Agikuyu (Heritage Library of African Peoples East Africa). Kabìra also has written many books about women and gender issues, among them: Our Secret Lives; They Have Destroyed the Temple, The Oral Artist, among many others.

=== Awards and honours ===
Kabira has received notable national honours from the Kenyan government recognizing her contributions to academia, women rights, and public service.

In 2014, she was awarded the Elder of the Order of the Burning Spear (EBS), a state commendation for distinguished service. She has also been granted the higher class of the Order of the Burning Spear (CBS). In 2015, the Ministry of Devolution and Planning honoured her with the Legacy Builders Recognition Award.

In 1999, the American Biographical Institute awarded her as the Woman of the Year, acknowledging her scholarly work in literature and African women's studies.

Kabira was nominated for the 2024 East Africa Women of Excellence Awards under the women of impact category- a regional recognition of her contributions to gender equity and women's empowerment. She was honoured in the United States for her scholarship and influence in women's rights and gender equality.

In 2026, she was recognised as Shujaa wa Katiba by the Kenyan Head of State for her role in Kenya's Constitution Making Process during the 2026 National Katiba Day Celebrations marking 16 years since promulgation of Kenya's Constitution.
