= Jamila Abbas =

Computer scientist

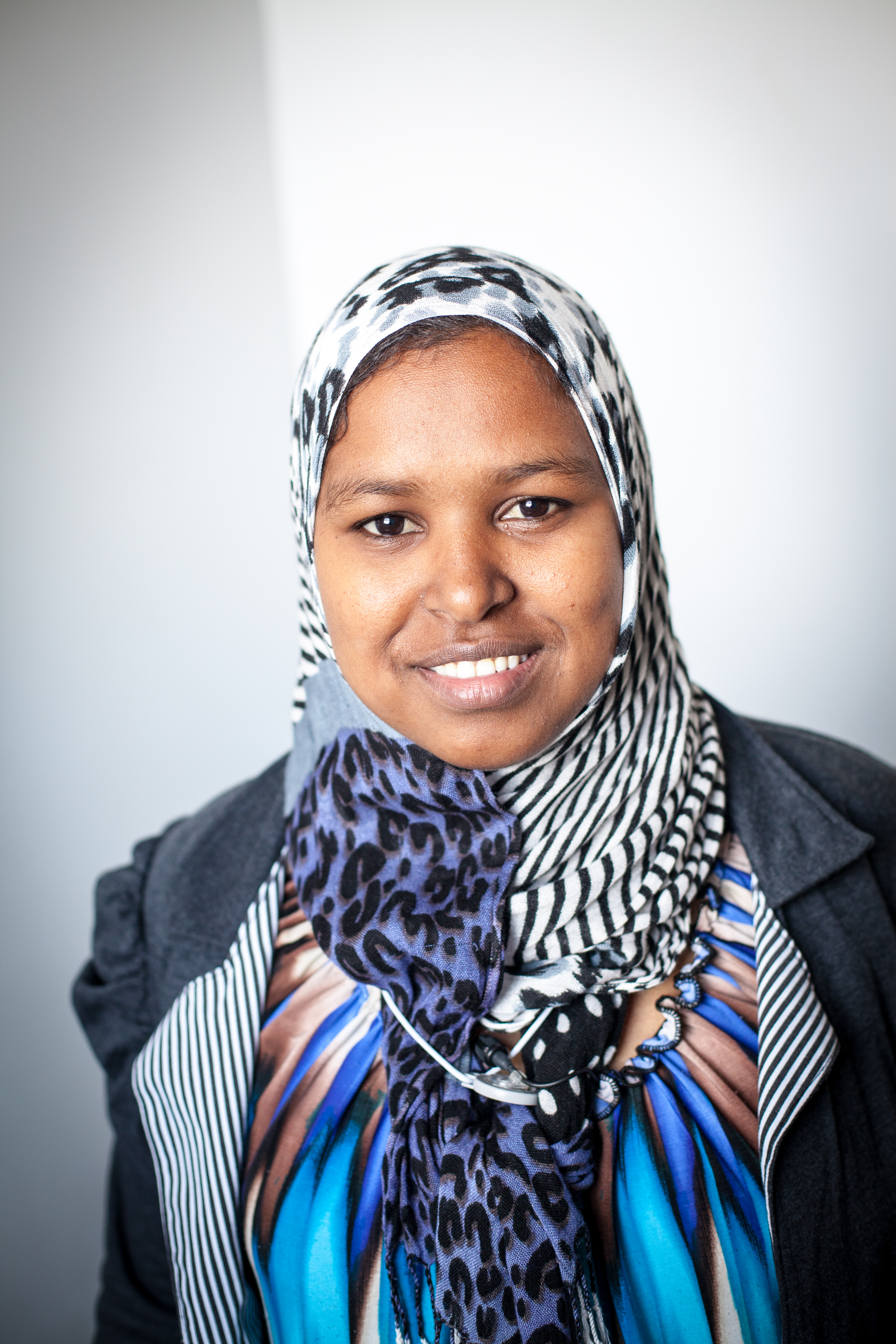
- Born: 1984 (age 41–42); Kenya
- Citizenship: Kenyan
- Education: Strathmore University (Bachelor of Science)
- Occupations: Computer scientist & business executive
- Years active: 2009–present
- Title: Founder & COO of MFarm Kenya Limited

Jamila Abbas is a computer scientist, software engineer, businesswoman and entrepreneur in Kenya. She is the co-founder and chief executive officer of MFarm Kenya Limited, an internet-based organisation that helps farmers find the best farm implements, seeds, access to weather reports and market information. She co-founded M-Farm in 2010.

== Background and education ==
Abbas was born in Kenya and attended local schools for her pre-university education. She attended Strathmore University, graduating with a Bachelor of Science degree in Software engineering.

== Career ==
Following her graduation from Strathmore University, Abbas was hired by Kenya Medical Research Institute. She also became member at iHub, a technology community, where techies gather to exchange ideas. There, she was reconnected with Susan Oguya, a friend from university. In September 2010, the two decided to actively do something about the plight of Kenyan small-scale farmers, using technology.

The two also joined AkiraChix, another forum for women with interest in information technology. There, they met three other Strathmore University students, Linda Omwenga, Lillian Nduati, and Catherine Kiguru. The five of them decided to enter IPO48, a software development competition. The event involved 100 contestants, organised in seventeen teams. The objective was to develop a computer application which could be turned into a marketable business, all within 48 hours.

The competition was organized by HumanIPO, from Estonia. In November 2011, the five women won the competition with their M-Farm application, which connects farmers with agro-suppliers, cooperatives and enables them to access current market prices for their produce in a timely manner. The five also won the top prize of KSh1 million (approx. US$10,000).

The group used their prize money to incorporate M-Farm Kenya Limited, with Abbas as CEO and Oguya as COO. Omwenga and Kiguru were marketing officers, and Nduati was the public relations officers.

== Other considerations ==
Abbas concurrently serves as the country director of New Vision Foundation, a Minneapolis-based non-profit organization.

== See also ==
- Agriculture in Kenya
- Economy of Kenya
