= Henrie Mutuku =

Kenyan gospel singer (born 1978)

Henrie Mutuku Mrs. Maina
- Born: 28 April 1978 (age 48); Kenya
- Origin: Nairobi, Kenya
- Genres: Gospel music
- Instrument: Piano
- Years active: 2002 - present
- Label: Last Day Records
- Website: henriemutuku.com

Henrie Mutuku (/ˈmʊtʊkuː/; born 28 April 1978) is a Kenyan Gospel singer.

== Early life ==
Mutuku was born in Nairobi in 1978, the firstborn with three brothers to Mr. and Mrs. Mutuku. She grew up in the Eastlands, a densely populated area in Nairobi inhabited by generally low income residents, and from a very young age was exposed to a diverse range of music styles including R&B, Reggae, Rap, Benga, Lingala and other African blends of music.

Henrie Mutuku's love affair with music was evident quite early in life when at the age of 5 she would sing in family gatherings, church, and nursery school. Later, when she was slightly older, it was the church choir where her talents for music were obvious and enhanced. She has also sung in the local church worship team, Christian Union, singing groups such as More Than Conquerers (MTC) and Prayer Partners (PPs).

Her Christian upbringing in the Eastlands suburb of Nairobi has influenced her style of music as she uses Swahili, English, her mother tongue Kamba and Sheng (a concurrence of English, Swahili and local, vernacular dialects) to express herself and communicate to her audience. Since then, she has grown to use basic Amharic and French, mainly due to the influence of Ethiopian and Congolese refugees living in her environs.

In upper primary school she toyed with the idea of making music her career choice and as an active member of the Drama Club and Choir mistress in Loreto High School, Limuru, her love and interest in music was solidified.

She is fluent in Swahili, English, Kamba (her mother-tongue) and Sheng.

== Music career ==
Henrie started working in music with local Christian artists like Izzo and Pete Odera as a background vocalist. She later featured predominantly in a 2002 compilation album 'Rebirth' produced by Soul Child Inc. Her career was catapulted after dual winning the KORA 2002 Best Artiste East Africa (with Eric Wainaina).

Henrie Mutuku's debut album was Simama ("Stand") which has gone on to contribute hit songs like "Usichoke" (featuring Roughtone and R.K) and "Manzi wa Maana" (featuring K.J. of Redykulass-a Kenyan comedy troupe). She has also featured prominently in popular music countdown radio shows like Kiss 100's "Smirnoff Top 7 songs in Nairobi", East Africa FM Radio's 'Link' and Kampala FM as voted by listeners. 'Manzi wa Maana' especially captured the hearts of young ladies, swiftly becoming an anthem of chastity and virtue, all the while redefining the true essence of a beautiful African woman. She has since recorded another music video for the song "Amini", taken off her album Simama.

Henrie Mutuku has curtain raised for Bebo Norman at two concerts, allowing her to make her first music video, "Nakuhitaji" (I Need You), created by the local Family T.V. for the promotion of the Bebo Norman Tour. She then recorded yet another music video for the song "Amini" (Believe), a feature in her album Simama.

In 2003 she won two Kisima Awards for Best Female Artiste and Best Contemporary Gospel Artiste. She was also nominated for a KORA Award in 2003.

Henrie Mutuku, after being away from the music scene for almost 10 years (from 2004), came back in 2014 with a new track by the name "Langu" off the album Tena (Again). In February 2017, Henrie officially launched the Tena album, a continuation of her first Simama album, for which she was reported to indicate that it is "different because she did not limit herself and tried new sounds and worked with a different producer, one David Higham."

Her name, Henrie, is in honour of her late uncle Henry Musyoki Kilonzi whom she describes as a generous man who desired for all of them to live in an honest and humble way.

== Inspiration ==
She draws her inspiration from the Word of God, testimonies of believers around her and other prominent Gospel musicians like Mary Atieno, female hymnwriters like Fanny J. Crosby and hymn translator Catherine Winkworth. She is greatly inspired by the hymn books, 'Hymns of Faith' by Scripture Union, 'Tenzi za Rohoni' by Lifeway for Baptist Convention of Kenya, Buruburu Baptist Church Songbook, 'Baptist Hymnal' by the Convention Press, an outfit of the Southern Baptist Convention in the US and 'Mbathi sya Kumutaia Ngai' by Ukambani Christian Literature. She is learning hymns in Kikuyu and open to learning from other ethnicities as well.

She believes that God's faithfulness in Jesus Christ has enabled her to grow in song writing, piano playing, strong vocals, faithfulness in service and fulfill her lifelong dream to be a hymnwriter.

== Songs ==
Songs written by Henrie Mutuku include:

- Simama (2002)
  - "Nakuhitaji"
  - "Manzi wa Maana"
  - "Usichoke" (Co-written by Rufftone and RKay)
  - "Amini"
  - "Kunaye Mungu"
  - "Ona"
  - "Songa Mbele"
- Tena (2014)
  - "Langu" (4 April 2014)
  - "Naomba" (31 March 2015)
  - "Usife Moyo" (9 June 2018)
- Singles
  - Featured in Rufftone's "Mola Wangu"
  - Featured in Davie's "Nisaidie Yesu"
  - "Chafua"
  - "Aiyoh" with Eddie Ivan Kaweera and Papy Mpiana
  - "Harusi" with Reuben Kigame

== Discography ==
The following is a list by year of albums released by Henrie Mutuku.

Year	Featured on	Notes
2002	Simama (Henrie Mutuku)	First solo studio album release
2014	Tena (Henrie Mutuku)	Second solo studio album release

The Tena Album won an 8-star rating at Cross Rhythms, UK.

== Literary work ==
Henrie Mutuku has also written articles on the blog UlizaLinks.co.ke discussing Christian approaches to life issues and current events, and insights in gospel music ministry. The articles include:

- Did You Know The World's Worst Kept SECRET?
- How Do I Start?
- Reason Why You Need To Bless But Not Curse Those Who Harm You.
- Important Things You Need To Do To Live In Harmony With Others.
- What Inspired the song "Naomba"
- How CHRISTIANS Should Respond To The Stark And Grotesque GARISSA Attack
- So You Want To LET Go?
- The DREAMS Of Garissa University Survivors Did NOT Die But Were Actually REBORN
- Aren't Mothers Special? My Mother Used To Distribute My CD's To Retailers
- Why YOU Need To Submit To The Governing Authorities
- To All Leaders – God Is Your Boss!
- The 5 Internal Conflicts of a Gospel Artiste
- Part 2: The 5 Internal Conflicts of a Gospel Artiste
- Part 3: The 5 Internal Conflicts of a Gospel Artiste
- Part 4: The 5 Internal Conflicts of a Gospel Artiste
- Part 5: The 5 Internal Conflicts of a Gospel Artiste
- The 5 Internal Conflicts of a Gospel Artiste: Bonus Issue
- Be Distinct – Lessons From August Landmesser

She also completed her manuscript for her book "God of Woman" in 2019.

== Personal life ==
Henrie Mutuku, is certainly more serious about her faith in the Lord Jesus Christ than anything else, including her music, a decision she made while still a child. This was clearly highlighted during her acceptance speech at the Kora Award 2002 where she credited God the Father, God the Son and God the Holy Spirit for the Kora Award before going on to recognise other colleagues who helped her along the way.

She believed in Jesus Christ as her Lord and Saviour, The Friend that sticks closer than a brother, The Author and Perfector of her faith at the age of six years during a school holiday at her parents' home. She was baptised at 17 by immersion. She is a registered member of Buruburu Baptist Church.

Henrie Mutuku married her fiancé, Pastor Charles Maina Njau, on 21 April 2014.

== Achievements ==
The following is a list by year of Mutuku's achievements:

Year	Activity	Note
1998	Malibu Sponsored Star Search	The Only Female Top 5 Finalist
1999	Ukumbi Awards (Organised by a neighbourhood coalition of youth groups in Nairobi)	Best Female Vocalist
1999	University Arts Achievement Award in Music (Organised by Kenyan Universities)	Winner
2000	Benny Hinn Choir	Featured as an Alto
2001	'Rebirth' Gospel Artistes compilation CD	Featured with her popular single "Nakuhitaji" (I Need You)
2001	Bebo Norman Kenyan Tour	Curtain-raised
2001	Kool and the Gang concert in Nairobi	Curtain-raised
2001	2002 KORA All Africa Music Awards (Pan African Music Award)	Nominee, Best Artiste East Africa
2002	2002 KORA All Africa Music Awards	Best Artiste East Africa
2002	2002 KORA All Africa Music Awards	First Runners Up, Best Female Artist of Africa (after Judith Sephuma)
2003	Kisima Music Awards (Kenya Premier Music Awards)	Best Female Artiste
2003	Kisima Music Awards	Best Contemporary Gospel Artiste
2003	Released her debut album Simama (Stand)	Album went on to contribute hit songs like "Usichoke" (featuring Roughtone and R Kay) and "Manzi wa Maana" (featuring K.J. of Redykyulass - A Kenyan comedy troupe) and have featured prominently in popular music countdown radio shows (in Kenya and East Africa). "Manzi wa Maana" has especially captured the hearts of young ladies and become an anthem of chastity, virtue and redefining the true essence of a beautiful African woman. "Kunaye Mungu" another title from this album managed a similar fate.
2003	2003 KORA All Africa Music Awards	Nominee, Best Artiste East Africa
2004	UNICEF Reception for Harry Belafonte in Nairobi	Performance
2004	Released single "Chafua"	A single that can be termed as her 'hip hop social responsibility attempt'. It received good airplay from Christian and secular stations. The song went on to be voted "Song of the Year" on "Activate" a leading Christian radio show.
2004	Co-wrote "Nisaidie", performed by Davie	Single became the song of the year on Hope FM (Christian Radio Station).
2004	American Gospel Music Awards	Nominated in the International Category
2004	Began work on her now released album Tena with David Higham, a UK producer	While in the UK, she was interviewed by Debbie Massey of Christian Voice broadcast to Africa radio show "Friend to Friend". Her songs "Songa Mbele" and "Usichoke" proved popular chart-busters in Christian Voice Africa Broadcasts.
2004	Wrote, recorded and later made a video "Amani ya Watoto"	Song funded by Amani ya Juu, an NGO that helps displaced mothers.
2009	Released the single "Aiyoh"	A collaboration with musicians from Uganda and Congo, dedicated to the evangelism of the gospel of Jesus Christ in Africa.
2013	Began writing her first hymn "The Cross"	Hymn writing efforts began
2014	Released the single "Langu" from the album Tena	On the show "The Trend" with Larry Madowo
2015	Released the single "Naomba" from the album Tena	On the 7 pm news programme on KTN with Mary Kilobi.
2016	Released the album Tena to Kenyan Radio Stations	Made it available on iTunes, Google Play, Spotify, Amazon and later Mdundo.
2017	Released her album Christmas Hymns on 24 December 2017	Available on Mookh and YouTube.
2018	Finished writing five hymns inspired by the Easter season	Hymns include "The Cross", "Secure", "He'll Wipe Our Tears" and "Your Sacrifice is Complete". Some are currently undergoing assessment by The Hymn Society of Great Britain and Ireland.
2018	Released the song "Harusi" in August	A collaboration with Kenyan Christian musician Reuben Kigame, a song dedicated to point marriages to God's design as illustrated in Genesis 2 and John 2 as an antidote to the onslaught on the traditional family in Kenya and beyond. With Shekinah Kigame, John Isaya and Reuben Kigame, she also did a cover of the hymn "My Jesus I love Thee" written by William Ralph Featherston.
2019	Completed manuscript of her book God of Woman	Book on Biblical Womanhood
2020	Released the Hymn "Taji Zetu" and poem "Born"	Released for the 2020 Christmas Season

== Other activities ==
She has been involved in Christian values campaigns like 'Protecting life Movement' and abstinence campaigns which in turn supports the war against HIV/AIDS, performing in events that highlight these pertinent issues. She loves to evangelise to all that she meets because she sees music as her tool of opening doors to share the gospel of Jesus Christ. She enjoys music that is rich in God's Word and is a strong proponent of Colossians 3:16 KJV.

Her talent has also come in handy in promotion of Bible Translation Literacy and Bible League work, two organisations involved in advancement of Bible literacy in Kenya and surrounding regions.

== See also ==
- Music of Kenya
- Gospel music
- Kisima Music Awards
