= Esther Mwikali =

Kenyan land rights activist (died 2019)

- Born: Kenya
- Died: August 2019; Mithini, Murang’a County, Kenya
- Citizenship: Kenyan
- Occupation: Land rights activist
- Known for: Advocacy for land rights of squatters in Kenya

Esther Mwikali (died August 2019) was a Kenyan land rights activist.

== Biography ==
Mwikali was a Kenyan land rights activist, who campaigned alongside civil society groups for the rights of people who were called squatters after businesses acquired the land they occupied.

Mwikali disappeared on 25 August 2019, which was noted when she failed to attend a village meeting. On 27 August 2019, Mwikali's body was found at a farm near her homestead in Mithini, Murang’a County, Kenya, displaying signs of torture.
