= Kenneth Ambani =

Kenyan actor

Kenneth Ambani (born 1970) is a Kenyan actor. He is the recipient of multiple awards in the Kenyan film industry.

== Early life ==
He was born in Busia County to Mary Wanjiru and the late Mzee Ambani Mudinyu. When he was in his teens, his parents separated, and his mother remarried. Shortly after, his father died, and he had to go live with his stepfather, who had another family. He came from a Christian family; his stepdad and his other family were Muslims. His mother and stepdad, Mohamed Hassan, raised him in the Bakarani area of the coastal city of Mombasa. Ambani grew up in a Muslim environment, and he regularly attended the mosque on weekdays, but he never abandoned the Christian faith. He attended the Sunday services at All Saints Cathedral. Ken enrolled at one of the coastal high schools. After completing secondary education, he enrolled in accounting classes, and he pursued a diploma in sales and marketing as well as a CPA at Mombasa Polytechnic. He is also a former student at Moi University, where he studied in the School of Communication and PR.

== Career ==
Kenneth Ambani began his acting career in his youth, Sauti House-KBC Mombasa produced his first professional role in the Swahili drama series Tushauriane. Immediately thereafter, he began Fate Makers, the very first English drama series. He took the oath of office as a Mombasa County Executive Committee Member (CECM) for Public Service, Administration, Youth, Gender, Social Services, and Sports in March 2023. He has also worked as a marketing manager at the Postal Corporation of Kenya.

Kenneth is the Founder and CEO of Mafiga Africa Communications Limited.

In October 2024, Kenneth Ambani was, amongst other three African Film Directors, selected to participate in The American Film Showcase (AFS). As an AFS Film and Television Leadership Initiative fellow, he had the opportunity to connect with global filmmakers from America and Africa. This month-long programme was aimed at enhancing cultural collaboration in the Film sector.

During this period he also had the chance to present at the Middleburg Film Festival in Virginia. He talked about the potential of the national Kenyan government growing the film industry in the country.

== Personal life ==
He was married once. His first wife died after bearing him a child. His second relationship never worked, after getting two children from it.

== Filmography ==
Year	Title	Role	Notes
2023	A better Life	Ken Ambani	TV Series
2022	Nimpende Nani	Kenneth Ambani	Movie
2020-2022	Kovu	Ken Ambani	TV Series
2019	The System	Kenneth Ambani	TV Series
2018	Wavamizi	Kenneth Ambani	Short
2009-2015	Makutano Junction	Ken Ambani	TV Series
2012	Shuga	Kenneth Ambani	TV Series
2010-2013	Noose of Gold	Temu	TV Series
2009	Block-D	Ken Ambani	TV Series
2008	From a Whisper	Abu	Movie
2008	Pamela	Ken	
2005	Naliaka is going	Ken	
1995-2000	Tausi	Baraza	TV Series

== See also ==
- Africa Movie Academy Award for Best Actor in a Supporting Role
