= Maureen Kimenye =

Kenyan physician and medical administrator

- Born: 1979 (age 46–47); Kenya
- Citizenship: Kenya
- Education: Moi University (Bachelor of Medicine and Bachelor of Surgery); The Research Institute of Tuberculosis, Japan (Diploma in Tuberculosis Epidemiology and Control); Kenya Institute of Management (Diploma in Project Management); University of Nicosia (Master of Business Administration)
- Occupations: Medical researcher & medical administrator
- Years active: 2003–present
- Title: Head of the Kenya National Tuberculosis, Leprosy & Lung Disease Control Programme

Maureen Kamene Kimenye Mariita, commonly known as Maureen Kimenye, is a Kenyan physician and medical administrator, who serves as the head of the National Tuberculosis, Leprosy & Lung Disease Control Programme in the Kenyan Ministry of Health.

== Background and education ==
Kimenye was born in Kenya, c. 1979.

After attending local primary and secondary schools, she was admitted to Moi University School of Medicine, where she obtained her Bachelor of Medicine and Bachelor of Surgery degree.

She studied at the Research Institute of Tuberculosis, Japa, graduating with a Diploma in Tuberculosis Epidemiology and Control. She also holds a Diploma in Project Management, obtained from the Kenya Institute of Management, in Nairobi, Kenya. She then spent one year in a fellowship program, studying multiple drug resistant strains of tuberculosis and HIV/AIDS in Lesotho, Southern Africa. Her Master of Business Administration degree was awarded by the University of Nicosia in Cyprus.

== Career ==
Kimenye is a leading authority in the treatment and control of tuberculosis in Sub-Saharan Africa. She oversaw the development of a mobile computer application, Tibu, which allows doctors to track records of over 550,000 tuberculosis patients in Kenya. She has helped Namibia and Ethiopia replicate the app.

She has a passion for teaching and is responsible for the education of over 1,000 people about how to treat tuberculosis. Using teleconferencing, she helps experts teach classes on tuberculosis. Some callers join with 15 or 30 other individuals within the call. The app, known as TB Echo, can host as many as 4,500 callers, simultaneously.

== Other considerations ==
In September 2018, Business Daily Africa, a Kenyan, English language, daily newspaper, named Kimenye among the "Top 40 Under 40 Women in Kenya in 2018".
