= Hope Mwanake =

Kenyan scientist and entrepreneur

- Born: 1988/1989
- Education: Egerton University
- Occupations: Entrepreneur; Environmental activist; Scientist
- Organization(s): Trace Kenya; Eco Blocks and Tiles
- Known for: Building houses with throw away plastic bottles.

Hope Wakio Mwanake (born 1988/1989) is a Kenyan entrepreneur and scientist. She is regarded as one of the emerging young entrepreneurs from Africa. In December 2019, she made headlines for her efforts in building houses with abandoned plastic bottles to eradicate plastic pollution in Kenya.

== Biography ==
Hope was born and raised up in a family near Mombasa. She was the first in her family to attend university to pursue her higher studies. She completed her Bachelor's degree in Aquatic sciences from the Egerton University in 2010. In 2013, she graduated in Environmental sciences from the UNESCO-IHE which is situated in Netherlands. Mwanake co-founded EcoHub Kenya in 2015, a social enterprise that trains young farmers in climate-smart agriculture and waste-to-resource technologies. She has represented Kenyan youth at COP26 in Glasgow, speaking on food security and climate adaptation.

== Career ==
She initially pursued her career as a social entrepreneur before becoming a scientist. She is the co-founder of Trace Kenya, a community based organisation which works jointly with youngsters in addressing issues related to solid waste management. Trace Kenya was established in the Central town of Kenya in Gilgil to manage and maintain waste disposals.

She also delivered vision speech at the 2015 World Water Week in Stockholm, Sweden. In 2016, she co-founded manufacturing company Eco Blocks and Tiles along with fellow scientist Kevin Mureithi. It also became the first company in Kenya to manufacture roof tiles and other construction materials from plastic and glass waste.
