= Amani Gracious =

Kenyan gospel singer

- Born: Amani Gracious; 8 May 2005 (age 20); Nairobi, Kenya
- Genres: Gospel
- Occupation: Singer
- Instrument: Vocals
- Years active: 2005–present
- Labels: Pine Creek Records

Amani Gracious (born 8 May 2005), Known popularly as Amani G is a gospel singer from Kenya who went viral on social media and got many people's attention including the American singer Alicia Keys by singing the cover of her song "Girl on fire" at age of 13.

== Biography ==
She released her first single "Sitasahau" and signed by the Pine Creek Records she was also double nominated for Maranata Global award in 2019

She released her first single 'In love' featuring Vivian, followed by 'Ni poa' featuring Pitson. Her third single called 'Asante' featured her younger sister Pendo. On 2 December 2018, Amani G launched her debut album 'My reflections at 13' at the Alliance Francaise Nairobi to a sold out crowd.

Her last single from the album 'Nisipotee' was released in 2019. In May 2019, Amani G won the 'Young Groover' award at the Groove Awards. She had also been nominated for 'Best Collaboration' Award for her song 'Ni poa' featuring Pitson.

Amani G joined Busara Academy in 2019 and took a break from releasing music to concentrate with her studies.

On 15 October 2021, Amani G released a new single called 'Uonekane' with many fans commenting about her vocal developmental and her new image at 16.
