= Susane Nabulindo =

Kenyan consultant anesthesiologist

- Born: 22 January 1980 (age 46); Kenya
- Citizenship: Kenya
- Education: University of Nairobi (Bachelor of Medicine and Bachelor of Surgery) (Master of Medicine in Anesthesiology) (Fellowship in Pediatric Anesthesiology)
- Occupation: Consultant anesthesiologist

Susane Nabulindo Masakhwe (née Susane Nabulindo) is a Kenyan consultant anesthesiologist at the Kenyatta National Referral Hospital. Her specialty is pediatric anesthesiology, a specialty where, in 2014, there were only five qualified Kenyans in the field. She is one of a very small number of female pediatric anesthesiologists in the country. She also concurrently serves as a lecturer in the Department of Anesthesia at the University of Nairobi, Kenya's largest public university.

== Background and education ==
Nabulindo was born in Kenya on 22 January 1980.

She attended St Anne's Girls Primary School, Mumias, in Mumias, Kakamega County, where she obtained her Primary Leaving Certificate. She then attended Sacred Heart Mukumu Girls High School, in the town of Mukumu, also in Kakamega County, where she obtained her High School Diploma, in 1997.

In 1999, she was admitted to the University of Nairobi, where she graduated in 2004, with a Bachelor of Medicine and Bachelor of Surgery degree. In 2007, she was admitted into the anesthesiology residency program at Kenyatta National Hospital, administered by the University of Nairobi. The program, lasting four years, leads to the award of a Master of Medicine (MMed) degree in Anesthesiology. She graduated with her MMed degree in 2010.

From 2013 until 2014, Nabulindo studied in an Anesthesiology Fellowship at the University of Nairobi. Part of that fellowship was spent in the United States, studying at Boston Children's Hospital and Monroe Carell Jr. Children's Hospital at Vanderbilt, in Nashville, Tennessee.

== Work experience ==
After her graduation from the MMed program, Nabulindo was hired as a lecturer at the University of Nairobi School of Medicine. She concurrently practiced anesthesiology at Kenyatta National Hospital, the largest referral hospital in the country, which also serves as the teaching hospital of the University of Nairobi. After her fellowship in 2014, she was appointed as a Consultant Paediatric Anaesthesiologist at the referral hospital.

== Other considerations ==
Nabulindo serves as the deputy secretary of the Kenya Society of Anaesthesiologists. In September 2018, she was named among the "Top 40 Women Under 40 in Kenya 2018", by the Business Daily Africa, an English language Kenyan daily newspaper.
