= Cnyakundi.com =

Kenyan news website

- Website type: Media
- Founded: 2013
- Headquarters: Nairobi, Kenya
- Key people: Cyprian Nyakundi (editor)
- Industry: Online media
- Website: www.cnyakundi.com
- Current status: Active

cnyakundi.com is a Kenyan news website founded by Cyprian Nyakundi. Some court rulings in Kenya have described the blog as an advocate of free speech on matters of corruption, corporate-fraud and breaking news in Kenya while other court rulings have described it as a blog for unverified news.

== Controversy ==
Cyprian Nyakundi has been sued several times for articles on cnyakundi.com, sometimes courts have ruled in his favour, sometimes he has been jailed and sometimes fined. In 2015 safaricom sued Nyakundi for publishing unverified news on cnyakundi.com. In 2018 politician and infamous fraudster repeatedly involved multiple advance fee scams of "fake gold" in Kenya with multiple foreigners repeatedly conned into disguised transactions for non-existent sometimes fake products. Steve Mbogo sued Nyakundi for publishing defamatory articles on the blog. In the same year the high court barred Nyakundi from authoring defamatory words against the politician and suspected fraudster. In March 2020 Nyakundi published an article on cnyakundi.com demanding a postmortem of a deceased Kenya Revenue Authority staff member who he accused the tax authority of concealing his cause of death, according to Nyakundi the cause of death was COVID-19. In June 2020 the law society of Kenya opposed the arrest of bloggers in Kenya and arraignment of blogger Nyakundi for publications on cnyakundi.com
