= John Githongo =

Kenyan journalist (born 1965)

John Gìthongo
- Gìthongo in 2008
- Born: 1965 (age 60–61); Kenya
- Citizenship: Kenyan
- Education: St. Mary’s School, Nairobi; University of Wales
- Occupations: Journalist; Anti-corruption campaigner
- Known for: Exposing the Anglo-Leasing scandal and whistle-blowing on corruption in Kenya
- Spouse: Mshai Mwangola
- Awards: CNN African Journalist of the Year Award (third prize)
- Website: Inuka Kenya Ni Sisi!

John Gìthongo (born 1965) is a former Kenyan journalist who investigated bribery and fraud in Kenya and later, under the presidency of Mwai Kibaki, took on an official governmental position to fight corruption. In 2005 he left that position, later accusing top ministers of large-scale fraud. In the Anglo-leasing corruption which he blew the lid over, fraudulent deliveries of government military and forensic laboratory equipment were allegedly ordered, "delivered" and the payment completed in the former president Uhuru Kenyatta's tenure. The story of his fight against corruption is told in Michela Wrong's book It's Our Turn to Eat: The Story of a Kenyan Whistle-Blower.

== Early life and education ==
Gìthongo's father Joe Gìthongo owned an accounting firm, President Jomo Kenyatta being one of its clients. John Gìthongo went to the prestigious St. Mary's School in Nairobi. He studied Economics and Philosophy at the University of Wales before returning to his native Kenya. He briefly worked as a management consultant and researcher before moving into journalism. In this role he wrote extensively for the Nairobi-based EastAfrican and Executive magazine, attacking corruption throughout Kenyan society under the Moi regime. He was also a correspondent for the British journal The Economist and wrote for a range of local and international papers as well. In the 1990s he received the CNN African Journalist of the year award (third prize).

== Transparency International ==
Following in his father's footsteps he joined the Transparency International movement. He founded and served as founder-Executive Director of the Kenyan chapter of Transparency International in 1999 after years of the government refusing its registration. He also served a board member of Transparency International in Berlin.

== SAREAT ==
In 1998, political scientist Mutahi Ngunyi's NGO – Series for Alternative Research in East Africa (SAREAT) funded by the Ford Foundation, engaged Gìthongo to edit a regional political economy magazine, East African Alternatives. The magazine folded after operating four issues. This was as a result of audit queries made by Price Waterhouse, and subsequent commercial court action brought against Ngunyi by the Ford Foundation with Mr. Githongo as a witness on behalf of the prosecution having revealed to Ford the initial problems that led to the audit in the first place. A case was instituted against SAREAT trustees by its donors but was apparently later withdrawn after SAREAT agreed to repay the funds under contention.

== Anglo Leasing ==
In January 2003 he was appointed to the position of Permanent Secretary for Governance and Ethics by the incoming president Kibaki, who had been elected on an anti-corruption platform. He resigned from his position on 7 February 2005 without comment, though it was reported that he felt the government lacked commitment to ending corruption and that he had received death threats, a common occurrence in Kenyan public office holding. As a result of his resignation international aid to Kenya was cut. He remains a powerful advocate against corruption.

On 22 January 2006, Gìthongo named vice-president Moody Awori as one of four top politicians with Kiraitu Murungi, former justice minister and then energy minister; finance minister David Mwiraria and former transport minister Chris Murungaru as being involved in scams worth $600M – known as the Anglo Leasing Scandal. He also claimed that President Kibaki was complicit in the affair. The scandal centered on the award of a huge contract given to Anglo-Leasing – a company that did not exist. Githongo claimed that the money raised would have funded the government's forthcoming election campaign. These allegations were denied by Awori and Murungaru and an investigation was to be done on the matter.

== Exile in the UK ==
Gìthongo moved to the UK to live in exile after claiming that there have been threats to his life. A secret cable by the US ambassador in Kenya to Washington dated 16/9/09, released by Wikileaks, made clear the extent of these threats. In one section the ambassador wrote –

"Paragraph 5 provides details of statements made by Ringera (former head of the Kenya Anti-Corruption Commission) to Gìthongo that Gìthongo took as direct threats to his life by the Kenyan political elite, to include Ringera. This TD corroborates Gìthongo's conclusion about Ringera who is identified in a room with leading Kikuyu politicians, including Ministers of government, plotting to kill Gìthongo in 2009. The conclusion one can draw from this report, combined with Gìthongo's testimony, is that Ringera is part of those within the Kenyan political elite seeking to suppress information and those with information that could assist in punishing and minimizing corruption in Kenya."

Wikileaks He took up a post at an Oxford college (Senior Associate Member of St Antony's College). It has also been recently revealed that he taken up an additional position as a visiting fellow of the Ottawa-based International Development Research Centre. In an interview with Fergal Keane for the BBC's Newsnight programme on 8 February 2006, Githongo revealed what he claims is taped evidence proving that Kiraitu Murungi attempted to impede his inquiries. Murungi suggested that a 30M Kenyan Shilling loan to his father by a lawyer A.H. Malik had been bought by Anura Pereira, and might be forgiven in exchange for 'going slow' on the Anglo Leasing investigation. He reveals that at the end of his investigations, he came to the inescapable conclusion that the Anglo Leasing scandal went all the way to the top, and as a consequence his life was in danger. Anglo Leasing, and many other similar deals, were rumoured by some people to be back-door financing to pay for NARC's election bid in 2007. While in Britain, Githongo spent two days giving evidence to a delegation of Kenyan MPs who were investigating the scandal. Both parties were positive about the outcomes of the meetings.

== Allegations of spying ==
Throughout the saga allegations about the sophisticated nature of the Githongo recordings and the reason and extent for the involvement of the British Embassy have been subject to rife speculation.

Dr Murungaru, who was also the National Security Minister, maintains that Githongo was and still is a British spy. On 10 February 2006, Murungi issued a statement that was faxed to all Kenyan media houses questioning the intentions and motives of John Githongo, in the form of 36 questions. Minister Murungaru was demoted as a result of Mr. Githongo's allegations and rejected by his own constituents during the 2007 general election. In 2006, Murungaru was banned from all travel to the United Kingdom by the British Home Secretary as a result of his involvement in corruption.

Among the questions asked was why John Githongo was recording his conversations with Government officials and asking how many other conversations he recorded including those with the president. Some who have interviewed Githongo say that in fact the Kibaki knew about and had approved of Githongo's recordings as early as February 2004. Speculation was also rife that Githongo's continued exile was directly related to the spying allegations and the fact that he broke various secrecy laws under the Official Secrets Act, that covered government officials. However, Githongo returned to Kenya in August 2008 and the government did not challenge his allegations or attempt to prosecute him under the Official Secrets Act.

== Post-exile works, awards ==
Githongo returned to Kenya in 2008, and founded an organisation called Inuka Kenya Trust, a grassroots advocacy group aimed at creating an informed citizenry. In January 2011, Githongo launched a new campaign, Kenya Ni Yetu (Kenya is Ours), aimed at mobilising ordinary people to speak up against corruption, impunity and injustice. Mr. Githongo was selected as one of the world's 100 most influential Africans by the London-based New African Magazine in its June 2011 edition. He is an advisory board member of the International Centre for Transitional Justice, NYC, Protimos, UK and a board member of the Africa Centre for Open Governance (AfriCOG), chair of the board, Africa Institute for Governing with Integrity, Freedom House. He is a Commissioner on the Independent Commission for Aid Impact (ICAI), UK. He is a board member of Kabissa, an organisation that serves the networking, information sharing and ICT peer learning needs of African Civil Society. Previously he has been awarded the African Annual Visionary Award (2009) by the African Centre for Strategic Studies/National Defence University (Washington DC), an honorary PhD (Doctor of the university), The Open University (UK) (2007) and in 2004, the German Africa Prize.

On 1 October 2015 Githongo was declared a recipient of the 2015 Allard Prize for International Integrity; sharing the CAD$100,000 prize with co-recipient Rafael Marques de Morais.

== Personal life ==
Githongo is married to Kenyan performance scholar and oraturist Mshai Mwangola, who holds a doctorate in Performance Studies from Northwestern University.

== See also ==
- Corruption in Kenya
- David Mwiraria
- Goldenberg scandal
- Kenya Anti-Corruption Commission
- National Rainbow Coalition
