= Eric Kinoti =

Kenyan entrepreneur of African descent (born 1984)

- Born: 8 March 1984 (age 42); Mombasa, Kenya
- Occupations: Industrialist, Entrepreneur shade systems EA.ltd
- Years active: 2009–present
- Known for: Business, Philanthropy
- Title: CEO and founder Shadesystems
- Website: www.erickinoti.com

Eric Kinoti is a Kenyan entrepreneur of African descent born in Mombasa on 8 March 1984. Along with being the Founder and CEO of Shade systems EA.ltd, a million dollar enterprise that has a presence in over 6 countries, he is on the boards of several prominent East African companies. He has won several awards in East Africa and internationally, has gained recognition for his entrepreneurial endeavors, and is also a noted philanthropist.

He is the Kenyan youth patron in the Kenyan Chamber of commerce and has received recognition as a youth entrepreneur from Kenyan president Uhuru Kenyatta. Apart from appearing on Forbes Africa's Annual List of 30 Most Promising Young Entrepreneurs in Africa twice, he received Kenya's SOMA Awards in 2014 for being the Most Influential SME Personality in Kenya in 2014.

== Early life ==
After college Kinoti worked as a cashier in a hotel in Malindi and that's where his entrepreneurial journey truly began. Since he worked in the night shift, Kinoti spent his day time buying and distributing eggs around Malindi town. A few years later, he moved to Nairobi where he distributed milk to hotels in the city. Kinoti, grew up in Meru, where he assisted his father in the shop as a cashier after school. Kinoti has conceded that, "I started Shade System Company aged 24 with only five employees and a seed capital of Sh60,000. I saw a business gap because this sector was predominantly controlled by non-Kenyans an attestation to his humble beginnings. However, his father, a shop owner, was determined on giving the young Kinoti the best education available.

== Education ==
Kinoti attended St. Martins Boarding Primary School, Abothogochi Academy, Nkubu High School and earned a Diploma in Business Management from Tsavo Park Institute.

== Business ==
Eric Kinoti immersed himself into entrepreneurism completely in 2007. With a capital of just KSh 20,000 (about $200), he started buying milk from Kinoo and Kiambu and supplying the city hotels both in Nairobi and Mombasa. With a saving of Ksh 60,000(US$600), he borrowed almost KSh2 million (US$20,000) from a Shylock in 2009, to set up Shade Systems where he ended up paying back the money with a million shillings (US$10,000) as the interest. He claims that was the worst decision he has ever made.

Today, Kinoti sits atop five powerful companies in Kenya and has been on Kenya's government delegation to several international economic meetings. Apart from Shade systems (EA) ltd, Eric Kinoti is also a founder and director of Alma Tents Ltd, Bag Base Kenya Ltd and SafiSana Home Services Ltd. With the onset of the 2009 and 2014 came the expansion of Shade Systems to other countries such as Rwanda, Somalia, Congo, Southern Sudan, Uganda and elsewhere with Kinoti being charged with business affairs in East and Central Africa region.

Kinoti has been regarded as the Warren Buffett of Africa by the sun news of Nigeria

== Philanthropy ==
Kinoti has organized workshops for young entrepreneurs in Africa under the name Entrepreneurs’ Boot Camp, featuring speakers from various African countries.

== Personal life ==
Eric Kinoti is married to a wife with whom he has one child. He lives in Westlands suburb of Nairobi, Kenya.

== See also ==
- List of African millionaires
- List of wealthiest people in Kenya
