= Khaleed Abdul =

Kenyan comedian and actor

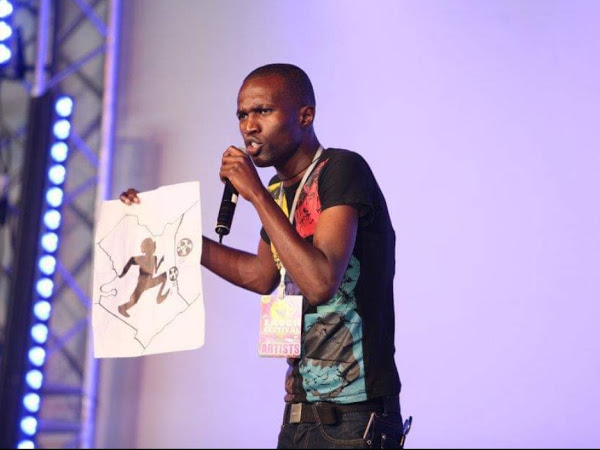
- Abdul in April 2015
- Born: Khalid Abdul Aziz; 7 August 1987 (age 39); Maralal, Samburu County, Kenya
- Other name: Farah
- Occupations: Comedian; actor; screenwriter; master of ceremonies; pastoralist
- Notable work: Classmates (as Farah); Vitimbi Plus (as Jinta Hunte); Churchill Show; Hapa Kule News
- Awards: Kalasha International Award for Best Performance in a TV Comedy (2015)

Comedy career
- Years active: 2015–present

Khaleed Abdul (born Khaleed Aziz Abdul; 7 August 1987), also known by his stage name Farah, is a Kenyan comedian, actor, screenwriter, master of ceremonies and pastoralist from Samburu County. He is best known for playing the character Farah in the television comedy series Classmates, broadcast on KBC Channel 1.

== Early life ==
Khaleed Abdul was born on 7 August in Maralal, Samburu County, in northern Kenya, the son of Abdul Aziz Ahmed, a teacher and District Education Officer. He attended Maralal Primary School before proceeding to Maralal High School in 2003, where he took part in inter-school entertainment and comedy competitions.

Before pursuing a career in entertainment, Khaleed worked as a livestock trader in Samburu. He later sold several camels to raise bus fare to travel to Nairobi to pursue acting.

== Career ==
Khaleed made his first television appearance in 2015 on the Churchill Show, which brought him wider recognition. He went on to appear on LOL, a comedy show aired on K24, and on Hapa Kule News, broadcast on KTN.

He is best known for his role as Farah on Classmates, a comedy series aired on KBC Channel 1, and as Jinta Hunte on Vitimbi Plus, aired on Maisha Magic Swahili.

In 2015, he won the Kalasha International Award for Best Performance in a TV Comedy.

== Philanthropy ==
Khaleed has taken part in community and charitable initiatives in Samburu County, including blood donation drives. In 2016, he took part in a 100-kilometre bicycle ride to raise funds for the medical bills of a young man from Samburu who required a kidney transplant.

He also helped organise the construction of a house for a woman from Maralal who had been physically impaired by polio since childhood.

In 2022, Khaleed and friends assisted a Maralal student who had been selling mandazi (fried dough) on the street to raise school fees, after the boy scored 367 marks in the 2021 Kenya Certificate of Primary Education (KCPE) but was unable to afford secondary school fees.

== Awards ==
Year	Award	Category	Result
2015	Kalasha International Awards	Best Performance in a TV Comedy	Won
2014	Cheka Awards	Best TV Sitcom (Classmates)	Won
