= Xtian Dela =

Kenyan YouTuber (born 1990)

- Born: Aurther Mandela; 18 February 1990 (age 36); Ngara, Nairobi, Kenya
- Other names: Xtian Dela
- Occupations: Radio Producer; Blogger; YouTuber; Radio Presenter
- Years active: 2007 – Present
- Known for: Radio Presenter on KISS FM KENYA
- Notable work: Head of Social and Digital Media at Jeff Koinange LIVE on Citizen TV & Radio Producer at KISS FM Kenya

Aurther Mandela (born 18 February 1990), better known as Xtian Dela, is a Kenyan YouTuber, blogger, social media personality, and radio presenter.

== Career and Recognition ==
In 2014, he won the Best Personal Blog at the African Bloggers Awards and the Most Influential Twitter Personality at the Kenyan Social Media Awards. In the same year, he was nominated at the Africa Social Media Award for the Social Media Hero in Africa, Twitter Handle of the Year in Africa and Influencer of the Year in Africa Awards. Still in 2014, he started an initiative on Twitter called #BringBackOurKDFSolders to force the Government of Kenya to bring back the Kenya Defence Force (KDF) who had been deployed in Somalia at that time to combat the Al-Shabab. The initiative was picked up by BBC who did a story about it.

In 2015 he won the award of The Best Twitter Personality in Africa in the African Bloggers Awards. In August the same year, he won Kenyan Corporate Social Media Personality of the Year Award at the Jumia Kenya Glamour Awards. In the same year he also won the Kenyan Twitter Personality of the Year in the KenyaBuzz People's Choice Awards. He joined Nation FM (formerly known as Easy FM) in September 2015 as a radio presenter hosting the popular Saturday morning show #TheDetox alongside Deejay Xclusive. In September 2015, he joined Jeff Koinange Live on KTN Kenya as the Head of Social and Digital Media.

In 2016 he won the award of the Best Facebook Profile in Africa and the Second Most Influential Twitter Personality in Africa in the Africa Bloggers Awards.The 2016 African Bloggers Awards were sponsored by the Bill & Melinda Gates Foundation. In 2016 he also became one of Viber's African partners.

In 2017 he partnered with FC Barcelona and Beko in the #Time2Play Experience campaign that saw 22 winners from across 22 Countries across the world fly to Camp Nou in Barcelona, Spain to have the FC Barcelona Experience. He was the only Influencer chosen in Africa to take part.

On 19 May 2018, he joined NRG Radio Kenya as a presenter, hosting the popular Hip Hop Show Full Throttle, alongside Grammy Award-winning Radio Personality Fatman Scoop and DJ Mr Vince.

In 2018, he was named among the Top 100 Most Influential Young Africans on the Continent by Africa Youth Awards, the biggest African youth awards scheme which recognises the achievements of young Africans, young change makers on the continent and beyond. Notable among the 2018 honorees are Uganda's Robert Kyagulanyi Ssentamu (Bobi Wine), Togo's Farida Bemba Nabourema, Egypt's Mohamed Salah, Nigeria's Davido, Guinea's ABD Traore, South Africa's Cassper Nyovest and Tanzania's Alikiba.

On 20 June 2019, he joined Kiss FM Kenya as the producer of newly revamped KISS FM Breakfast show alongside presenters Kamene Goro and Jalango.

== Early life ==
Xtian Dela was born in Ngara, Nairobi, on February 18, 1990. Xtian received his primary education at Likii Primary School and his secondary education at Moi High School Kabarak. In 2009, he enrolled at the University of Nairobi School of Business.

== Awards and honors ==
- Africa Youth Awards
  - Top 100 Most Influential Young Africans
- African Blogger Awards
  - Best Personal blog in Africa, 2014
  - Best Twitter personality in Africa, 2015
  - Best Facebook profile in Africa, 2016
  - Runner-up, best Twitter profile in Africa, 2016
- Jumia Kenya Glamour Awards
  - Corporate Social Media Personality of the Year, 2015
- Kenya Buzz Awards
  - Twitter Personality of the Year, 2015
- Kenya Social Media Awards
  - Most Influential Kenyan on Twitter, 2014
- Africa Social Media Awards
  - (Nominated) Most Influential Online Personality in Africa, 2015
  - (Nominated) African Social Media Hero of the Year, 2015)
- GeoPoll Kenya – Top 15 Most Influential Kenyan on Social Media, 2021
