= John Mwirichia =

Kenyan politician

John G. M. Mwirichia is a Kenyan politician and businessman. He entered politics in 1992 during the struggle of multiparty democracy in Kenya and was a leader of the Ford party. When multiparty democracy was achieved, he went on to be elected Ford-Kenya chairman Nairobi branch and has since held various positions in the party. He has opposed the award of salary increment by MPs. Mwirichia has argued that Kenya does not need 'Foreign Constitutional Experts' as equivalents can be found within the country.

Mwirichia founded the ball manufacturing company Sportex Investments in 1999. He is also Finance Director of Kenya Industrial Estates.
