= Pamella Makotsi-Sittani =

Kenyan journalist and an author (born 1969)

- Born: 1969 (age 56–57); Ikolomani
- Citizenship: Kenya
- Education: University of Nairobi
- Occupation: Journalist

Pamella Makotsi-Sittoni (born 1969) is a Kenyan journalist and an author who currently serves the Executive Editor and Managing Editor of the Daily Nation at the Nation Media Group (NMG). She got the position in 2019, making her the first woman to hold such a position in the publishing house’s history.

== Background and education ==
Makotsi-Sittoni was born in Ikolomani, Kakamega county, Kenya. She obtained a Degree in Literature and Anthropology from The University of Nairobi and a Post Graduate Diploma in Communication from the same institution, She obtained a Master's degree in news media, Democracy and Governance from the University of Leicester in the United Kingdom.

Ms. Makotsi-Sittoni was named a fellow of the Aspen global leadership Network Initiative.

== Career ==
In 1993, Makotsi-Sittoni started as a reporter at the Nation Media Group (NMG) and worked in a number of positions till she was appointed chief sub-editor. In 2003, she moved to the Standard Group in 2003 as Deputy Managing Editor for the Standard Group newspaper; The Standard, till 2005. Between 2006 and 2012, she left the media world to work as a Communication Specialist for the United Nations Children's Fund (UNICEF) Kenya office.

She rejoined the Nation Media group in 2012, as the Managing Editor of NMG's regional newspaper, The East African. She was subsequently named the Executive Editor and Managing Editor of the Daily Nation in 2019.

Away from her formal work with the media, Makotsi-Sittoni was in 2017 named by the World Association of Newspapers ( WAN-IFRA ) the Laureate of the Women in News Editorial Leadership Award for Sub-Saharan Africa.

== Personal life ==
Makotsi-Sittoni is married and is a mother of 3 daughters.
