= Ng'endo Mwangi =

Female Kenyan doctor

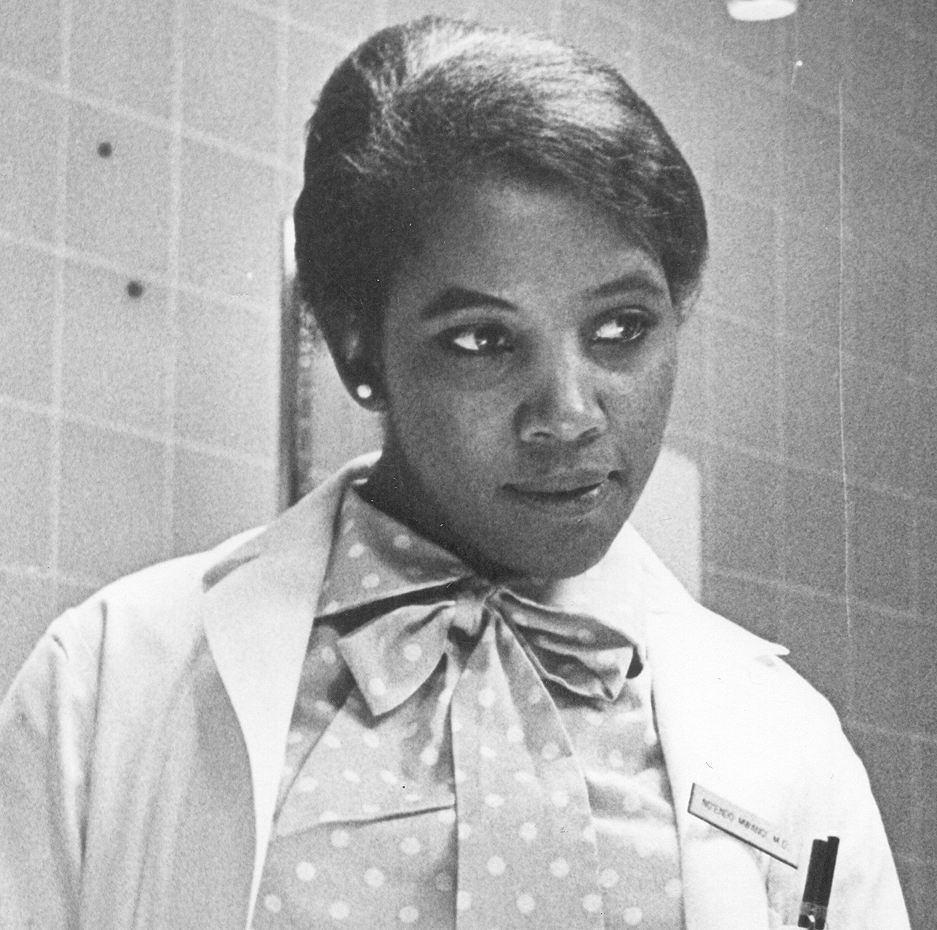
- Mwangi in operating room, 1965
- Born: Kinoo, Kiambu, Kenya
- Died: October 30, 1989; Nairobi, Kenya
- Other names: Florence Gladwell, Florence Mwangi Mwilu
- Education: Smith College (1961)
- Occupation: Physician

Ng'endo Mwangi (December 1936 - October 30, 1989), also known as Florence Gladwell or Florence Mwangi Mwilu, was Kenya's first woman physician. She set up clinics serving a very large rural population. She was the first Black African woman to attend Smith College, and the first African student at Albert Einstein College of Medicine.

== Early life and education ==
Mwangi was born in December 1936 Kinoo, Kiambu, Kenya, the daughter of Rahab Wambui Mwangi and Mwangi Muchiri. She attended Loreto High school, Limuru, as part of its pioneer class. She was chosen to participate in the Kennedy Airlifts, organized by Tom Mboya, which provided opportunities for East African students to pursue university studies in the United States.

She became the first Black African woman to attend Smith College in Massachusetts in 1959. She graduated from Smith College in 1961.

After completing her Bachelor of Arts at Smith College, Ng’endo Mwangi pursued medical studies at the Albert Einstein College of Medicine in New York City. She was the first African student admitted to the program and received her Doctor of Medicine degree in 1965. Following her graduation, she chose to return to Kenya rather than remain in the United States, motivated by a commitment to improving access to healthcare, particularly in underserved rural communities.

== Career ==
Returning to Kenya as a qualified physician, Mwangi opened her first practice, the Athi River Clinic, in an arid rural region southeast of Nairobi where she was the only doctor for over 300,000 Maasai people. In 1987 she founded the Reto Medical Center at Sultan Hamud.

== Honors ==
Members of the Black Students Alliance at Smith College made the case for additional facilities on campus and, in 1973, the Mwangi Cultural Center was established and named in her honor. At that time the center was located at Lilly Hall but it later was moved to the Davis Center at Smith College. She was awarded an honorary degree by Smith College in 1987. In 2005, the Mwangi Center was renovated and rededicated, with a keynote address by her daughter Wangui Mwangi.

== Personal life ==
Mwangi formally changed her name from Florence Gladwell in 1967. She died of breast cancer in 1989, in Nairobi.
