= Teresa Akenga =

Kenyan Academic

Founding Vice-Chancellor
- In office 10 June 2013 – 11 June 2023

Personal details
- Born: Ebubayi, Bunyore, Kenya
- Education: Kenyatta University (BEd, MSc); University of New South Wales (PhD); KCA University (MBA)
- Occupation: Chemist, academic administrator

Teresa Ayuko Oduor Akenga is a Kenyan chemist and academic administrator who served as the founding Vice-Chancellor of the University of Eldoret from 10 June 2013 to 11 June 2023. She is a professor of organic chemistry and also serves as Chair of the Forum for African Women Vice-Chancellors (FAWoVC).

== Early life and education ==
Akenga was born in Ebubayi, Bunyore, Kenya. Her father encouraged her pursuit of science subjects, which were less common for girls at the time. She earned a Bachelor of Education (Science, Chemistry major) with First Class Honours and a Master of Science in Chemistry from Kenyatta University. Akenga completed a Master's Qualifying program and a PhD in Organic Chemistry (Synthesis) at the University of New South Wales in Australia. She later obtained a Master of Business Administration (Corporate Governance) from KCA University in Nairobi.

== Academic and administrative career ==
Akenga is a lecturer of chemistry and mathematics. Akenga held senior roles including Deputy Vice-Chancellor for Academics, Research, and Extension at the Management University of Africa and Deputy Principal for Academic Affairs at Bondo University College (now Jaramogi Oginga Odinga University of Science and Technology).

== Awards and memberships ==
She received the Moran of the Burning Spear from President Uhuru Kenyatta in 2013 for contributions to education and research. In 2020, she was honored as the Best Woman in Education Leadership in East Africa by the Asian Confederation of Businesses and World Education Congress. She is a member of the Royal Society of Chemistry (MRSC), Kenya Chemical Society (KCS), Society of Environmental Toxicology and Chemistry (SETAC), and the Organization for Women in Science for the Developing World (OWSD).
