= Mark Kaigwa =

Kenyan entrepreneur (born 1988)

- Born: Mark Kaigwa; 18 January 1988 (age 38); Nairobi, Kenya
- Education: Strathmore University
- Occupations: Business executive, author
- Known for: Author of African digital innovation and technology.
- Notable work: Co-writer of Pamoja Mtaani
- Title: CEO and founder at Nendo

Mark Kaigwa (born 18 January 1988) is a Kenyan entrepreneur, author, and professional speaker.

Kaigwa is the founder and CEO of Nendo, a Nairobi-based digital marketing company he founded in 2013. Born in Kenya, Kaigwa is an author of African digital innovation and technology. Kaigwa is a co-writer of Pamoja Mtaani, the first African video game, produced by Warner Bros. in 2007. Through Nendo, Kaigwa is known to release annually the African social media trend report, the first was released in 2014. Kaigwa is also a co-founder and partner at Afrinnovator, a digital media and analytics company. In 2013, Kaigwa was recognized among the 30 under 30 Best Young Entrepreneurs in Africa by Forbes.

== Early life and education ==
Kaigwa was born on 18 January 1988 in Kenya. He pursued his university studies in Business and Information Technology at Strathmore University in Kenya.

== Career ==
=== Early video game and writing career ===
In 2007 Kaigwa co-wrote and consulted on Warner Bros. Interactive's first African video game, Pamoja Mtaani. He worked as an animator and creative consultant for Warner Bros in 2008. From 2009 to 2010, Kaigwa served as a senior copywriter at Brainwave Communications Ltd. Between 2010 and 2013, Kaigwa was a partner at the African Digital Art Network, where he contributed to the research, writing, and curation of African animation. In 2017, Kaigwa served as a mentor for XL Africa, an acceleration program launched by the World Bank, for five months. He is also the course director of Media Leaders Africa, a program owned by the BBC.

=== Business ===
Kaigwa gained media recognition in Kenya's tech scene in 2009 when he founded GotIssuez, a consumer service startup that operated as an online suggestion box, enabling consumers to document their experiences online.

==== Nendo ====
Kaigwa is the founder and CEO of Nendo, a digital marketing company based in Nairobi, Kenya. Founded in 2013, Nendo supports ambitious leaders and teams in engaging Africa's connected audiences, covering over 20 African countries. Nendo's first social media Trend Report, released in 2014, monitored online social habits among Nairobi's tech-savvy community and predicted trends for 2015. In 2014, Kaigwa through Nendo, released the digital publication "A to Z of Kenyans on Twitter," offering insights into the Kenyan Twitter landscape by identifying key influencers and trends. This publication serves as a valuable resource for understanding social media dynamics in Kenya, particularly how Twitter is leveraged for communication and influence. The initiative underscores Nendo's dedication to digital research and highlights the increasing significance of social media in Kenya's digital ecosystem.

==== Afrinnovator and African digital art ====
Kaigwa is a co-founder and partner at Afrinnovator, a digital media and analytics company focused on business, economics, and investments in Africa. He is also a partner at African Digital Art, an online network that serves as a leading resource for creative inspiration in animation, illustration, photography, and design from Africa.

=== Notable forum participation ===
Kaigwa has provided insights into the use of social media during crises, notably recounting the Westgate shopping mall terrorist attack in 2013, where he analyzed how terrorists communicated via social media with government officials and the broader impact of smartphones and social media in Nairobi. Kaigwa was one the 40 finalists from the African continent presented their creations at the 2013 DEMO Africa technological innovation. He proposed 9 tips to boost Africa's Tech Sector in 2014.

In 2016 Kaigwa was a featured speaker at ISACA's first-ever Africa CACS Conference, which brought together professionals in governance, risk, and cybersecurity. At the event, he shared his insights on the digital landscape in Africa, highlighting the importance of cybersecurity and governance in the rapidly evolving tech environment.

In June 2018 Kaigwa participated in a discussion on the impact of social media during the 2017 Kenyan general election, focusing on the rampant misinformation. Through Nendo, he developed the "Stop Verify Reflect" quiz to help combat fake news by teaching users how to identify it. Kaigwa emphasized the need for better measures by the Independent Electoral Boundaries Commission (IEBC) and advocated for improving media literacy.

Kaigwa has made animated movies and has been actively involved in curating African Digital Art. He is a frequent speaker on topics related to digital media, technology, and entrepreneurship in Africa. Kaigwa is a member of the Kenyan chapter of the Entrepreneurs' Organization and an alumnus of its acceleration program. He also serves as a non-executive director of FinCredit Ltd, a Kenyan microcredit institution.

== Recognition ==
- 2013: One of the 30 under 30 Best Young Entrepreneurs in Africa by Forbes.
- 2018: One of the Top 25 Men in Digital by DigiTalk Kenya.
- 2022: The 2nd runner-up in the Global Compact Network Kenya (GCNK) SDG Pioneer awards.
