= Elizabeth Gitau =

Kenyan physician (born 1988)

Elizabeth Gitaū
- Born: 1988 (age 37–38); Kenya
- Education: University of Nairobi; (Bachelor of Medicine and Bachelor of Surgery); Strathmore University; (Master of Business Administration); Hamburg University of Applied Sciences; (Research Methodology & Project Management Course)
- Occupations: Physician and corporate executive
- Years active: 2006–present
- Title: Chief executive officer of Kenya Medical Association

Elizabeth Gitaū also Elizabeth Gitaū-Maina (born c. 1988), is a Kenyan physician and corporate executive, who is the chief executive officer of Kenya Medical Association, the national industry association that aims at championing and preserving the interests of the medical doctors practicing in the country.

== Background and education ==
Gitaū was born in Kenya c. 1988. She graduated from the University of Nairobi with a Bachelor of Medicine and Bachelor of Surgery (MBChB) degree in 2012. She went on to obtain a Master of Business Administration degree from Strathmore University in Nairobi in 2016. In 2017, she was awarded a scholarship from the German Academic Exchange Service (German: Deutscher Akademischer Austauschdienst) (DAAD), to study in Germany, where she undertook a Research Methodology & Project Management Course at the Hamburg University of Applied Sciences.

== Career ==
After graduating from medical school, and after the mandatory internship, she worked as a medical officer at Mūrang'a County Hospital for nearly two years until December 2014.

As of April 2019, Gitaū had worked as a senior lecturer at the Kenya Medical Training College, a school that trains clinical officers (formerly medical assistants) at diploma level, based at the campus in the town of Thika.

As the incoming CEO at Kenya Medical Association, she took over from Stellah Wairimu Bosire-Otieno, who led the association from 2017 until 2019. Previously, Gitaū was the treasurer of the Nairobi County Division of Kenya Medical Association (KMA). In March 2021, amidst the COVID-19 pandemic, Gitaū criticized Kenya for prioritizing vaccines for diplomats over healthcare workers and the elderly.

In March 2023, Dr Elizabeth Gitaū was appointed to sit on the board of Kenya Medical Practitioners and Dentists Council (KMPDC), as a member. She is also a member and convener of the Young Doctors Network.

== See also ==
- Shitsama Nyamweya
