= Margaret Nyakang'o =

Kenyan accountant

- Born: 1959 (age 66–67); Kenya
- Education: University of Liverpool (Doctor of Business Administration); Institute of Certified Public Accountants of Kenya (Member of the Institute of Certified Public Accountants of Kenya)
- Occupations: Accountant, financial controller
- Known for: Management
- Title: Controller of Budget of the Republic of Kenya
- Spouse: David Nyakang'o

Margaret Nyakang'o is an accountant, financial manager and civil servant in Kenya, who became the "Controller of Budget of the Republic of Kenya", in December 2019, the second person to serve in that capacity, since the office was established. She was sworn into office on 4 December 2019, having been approved by Parliament, the previous day. Immediately prior to her current assignment, she was a director at the Kenya National Bureau of Statistics (KNBS).

== Background and education ==
Margaret Nyakang'o was born in Kenya circa 1959. She holds a Doctor of Business Administration (DrBA) degree, obtained from the University of Liverpool, in the United Kingdom. She is also a Member of the Institute of Certified Public Accountants of Kenya (ICPAK).

== Career ==
Nyakang'o is a certified public accountant (CPA). She has previously worked as the Director of Finance at the Africa International University, in Karen, Nairobi, Kenya. She was selected as the best candidate out of a field of fifteen applicants, including the acting Controller of Budget, Stephen Masha. She was interviewed by the Parliamentary Committee on Finance and National Planning and forwarded to President Uhuru Kenyatta for approval. She replaces Agnes Odhiambo, the first Controller of Budget, whose eight-year non-renewable term came to an end on 27 August 2019. She began her term on 4 December 2019.

== Family ==
Dr. Margaret Nyakang'o is married to David Nyakang'o. Son Tuesday nyakang'o

== Other considerations ==
Margaret Nyakang'o is a member of the Association of Women Accountants of Kenya, where she mentors young, aspiring, women professionals.

== See also ==
- Government of Kenya
- Counties of Kenya
- Economy of Kenya
- Stella Kilonzo
