= Stellah Wairimu Bosire-Otieno =

Kenyan physician and corporate executive

Stellah Wairimū Bosire
- Born: 1987 (age 38–39); Kenya
- Education: University of Nairobi; Bachelor of Medicine and Bachelor of Surgery; Bachelor of Laws; University of London; Master of Science in Global Health Policy; Strathmore University; MBA in Healthcare Management; Geneva Foundation for Medical Education and Research; Diploma in Reproductive Health
- Occupations: Physician, corporate executive, human rights advocate, gender expert

Stellah Wairimū Bosire is a Kenyan physician, corporate executive, human rights activist and author, and the executive director of the Africa Center for Health Systems and Gender Justice. She is the former co-executive director of Uhai Eashri, chief executive officer of Kenya Medical Association, and vice-chair of the HIV and AIDS Tribunal of Kenya.

== Background and education ==
She was born and grew up in Kibera, the largest slum in Nairobi, Kenya's capital and largest city. Bosire was a student at Kibera Primary school but sat for Kenya's Certificate of Primary Education at Joseph Kang'ethe Primary School. She had a challenging childhood, having spent a better part of her life as a homeless street child, which exposed her to various violations, including sexual violence. She became addicted to drugs and alcohol while still a teenager. Bosire's mother had schizophrenia and therefore required very close help from her children. Her mother died from HIV/AIDs related complications in 2011.

Bosire enrolled in State House Girls High School in Nairobi for her O-Level education, graduating in 2003. Following the completion of her A-Level schooling, she was admitted to the University of Nairobi to study human medicine, graduating in 2012 with a Bachelor of Medicine and Bachelor of Surgery degree. She obtained a Master of Science degree in Global Health Policy from the University of London International Programmes in 2017. She also holds a Master of Business Administration degree program at Strathmore Business School, and as of 2017, was enrolled for a Bachelor of Laws, degree at the University of Nairobi. She also holds a Diploma in Reproductive Health, obtained from the Geneva Foundation for Medical Education and Research in 2016.

== Career ==
Bosire is a health professional with extensive international and domestic experience with and foreign government agencies, private donors, and other organizations monitoring and appraising public health programs, conducting epidemiological and operations research; measuring the impact of novel techniques for disease prevention, treatment, and mitigation; and document program outputs, effectiveness, and strategic development.

As a gender specialist, she is an expert in organizational development and results-based management She has worked with, multilateral governments, public and private philanthropies, INGOs, CBOs, and governments to build capacity in gender equality and women's rights as well as other marginalized communities. She performs gender analysis, analyzing from grassroots levels (the micro-level), intermediate levels (Meso level), the highest political levels (macro-level), and across all sectors and programs of development collaborations. She has been involved in conducting policy briefs, research, project review, and evaluation studies, and baseline surveys in the following areas: sexual and reproductive health and rights, HIV, TB, human rights, key population, and public health. Training and gender are crosscutting themes.

Previously, following the completion of her internship, she worked for the Government of Kenya for a year before she moved to the private sector. She was employed by Avenue Healthcare, a network of urgent care centers, as the physician manager taking up leadership of various branches. Since September 2013, Otieno has served as the vice-chairperson of the HIV/AIDS Tribunal of Kenya. In this capacity, she focuses on advancing human rights and access to justice for persons affected and infected by HIV/AIDS. In 2016, she left Avenue Healthcare to be involved in public healthcare policy in Kenya as chief executive officer of Kenya Medical Association. Effective October 2016, she was appointed as the chief executive officer and secretary to the board of Kenya Medical Association, industry advocacy and advisory group. She currently serves on the global Advisory Council for CFK Africa, a leading NGO working in Kenyan informal settlements.

Until July 2022, Bosire was a co-executive director of UHAI EASHRI.

== Articles written ==
- Hospital Debt, Detention and Dignity in Health
- TB and Gender Assessment
- Vaccinate girls to save them from cervical cancer
- Lessons for Kenya from US actions on Geneva Consensus Declaration
- The skeletons in the medical field
- We are partly to blame on school unrest
- Participatory grant-making, can we afford not to do it?
- Anti-homosexual laws prevents us from achieving Universal Health Coverage
- Challenging the cookie-cutter solutions to philanthropy
- What Justice Kavanaugh means for Kenya
- LGBTIQ+ health is about way more than sex
- How sex pests get away with murder
- Ezekiel’s Mutua’s woes were painfully predictable
- Equality for African Women
- Taking the lead on human rights
- Powerful activists at the frontline of gender equality
- Racial diversity in Global Health

== Other considerations ==
In 2017 she was named among the "Top 40 Women Under 40 in Kenya" by the Business Daily Africa, an English language daily business newspaper.

In 2019, she was named as the recipient of the Accountability International Leadership Award. The Award, given annually by Accountability International, "is intended to be presented to persons or organizations who play an exceptional role in promoting accountability in the international response to human rights and inclusive sustainable development". That same year, she was awarded by the Queen of England with the Commonwealth Point of Light Award 2019.
