= Josiah Mwangi Kariuki =

Mau Mau fighter and Kenyan socialist (1929–1975)

- Josiah Mwangi Kariuki, Kenyan Mau Mau freedom fighter, politician, and socialist.

Secretary to the President of Kenya

Member of Parliament
- Nickname: JM

Josiah Mwangi Kariūki (21 March 1929 – 2 March 1975), popularly referred to as 'JM', was a Kenyan socialist politician during the administration of Jomo Kenyatta's government. JM famously remarked that "Kenya had become a country of 10 millionaires and 10 million beggars." He held different government positions from Kenya's independence in 1963 until his assassination in 1975, likely carried out by high-ranking officials in the Kenyan security establishment.

== Early life ==
J. M. Kariūki was born in Kabati-ini town in Rift Valley province, to Kariūki Kigani and Mary Wanjiku. He was the only boy in a family of five siblings. In 1938, he briefly enrolled in Evanson's Day School but dropped out shortly after due to a lack of school fees. He worked on a European settler's farm until 1946 when he won a bet on a horse at the Nakuru Races. Using his winnings he re-enrolled himself in primary school and although he attended several schools he was finally able to finish his primary education in 1950. Later, he joined King's College Budo in Uganda's Wakiso district for his secondary education.

== Political life ==
It is likely that Kariuki became interested in politics at an early age. Before his birth, his parents had been displaced in 1928 from their family land, Chinga, in the Nyeri native reserve, to work in the 'White Highlands'. There, they became squatters on a European settler's farm, deprived of land rights and essentially forced to work on settler land for low wages.

In the 1940s, Kariuki joined his primary school drama group which presented plays dramatizing efforts to resist colonial rule. In 1946, he attended a political rally where Jomo Kenyatta denounced the British colonial government's treatment of native Kenyans. While in Uganda for his secondary education, Kariuki closely followed the struggles that local Kenyans were facing from the European settlers. On 22 October 1952, he graduated from secondary school and returned to Kenya shortly before the country was placed under a State of Emergency by the new Governor, Sir Evelyn Baring, and Kariuki joined the Mau Mau uprising. After he took his oath, he started working as a Mau Mau liaison officer between Eldoret and Kisumu. Kariuki also helped solicit money, boots and housing for the Mau Mau. This led to his arrest in his hotel, which served as a front for his political activities. He was then detained in various camps (including Kowop and Langata) from 1953 until his release, seven years later in 1960.

After his release, he managed to secure Kenyatta's approval in starting Nyeri's Kenya African National Union (KANU) branch by visiting him in detention. When Kenya became independent, Kariuki worked as Kenyatta's private secretary between 1963 and 1969.

== Conflict with Kenyatta government ==
In the late 1960s and early '70s, Kariuki's relationship with Kenyatta became strained as Kariuki became increasingly vocal in his criticism of Kenyatta's governmental policies and their results, including high levels of government corruption, widening inequalities, and the deterioration of relations between Kenya and other members of the East African Community. In addition, the KANU government under Kenyatta had failed to provide drought relief, and had mismanaged the economy in the wake of the 1973 oil crisis. Kariuki criticized the unfair distribution of land by the Kenyatta regime. After Kenya's independence, the United Kingdom had given the Kenyatta government funds to buy back land from European settlers. However, the land bought back was never redistributed to those Kenyans who previously lived in these settled areas: instead, most of it was given as gifts to Kenyatta's family and friends or as bribes to influence political allies.

In 1974, Kariuki was elected as Nyandarua North Constituency's Member of Parliament and served as an assistant minister in the Kenyatta government between 1968 and 1975. This was despite the government making every effort to thwart his re-election; JM Kariuki's popularity among ordinary Kenyans threatened to overshadow Kenyatta's own.

JM's speeches became increasingly populist, he donated ostentatiously to charity, and his political enemies believed he was eyeing the presidency. While Kenyatta praised Kenya's great progress, JM declared that Kenya "had become a country of 10 millionaires and ten million beggars." In December, JM was openly threatened at the Nakuru Stag's Head Hotel by Kenyatta's son, and by Kiambu mafia boss, Peter Muigai. Muigai told JM, "You have brought trouble here from Nyandarua. Be warned: This is Nakuru and we can finish you at any time!"

Between 1972 and 1975, JM became isolated from Kenyatta and was blocked from meeting him by Kenyatta's senior advisors. In January 1975, an Assistant Minister of the government met JM at the Norfolk Hotel and warned him of an assassination plot. The plot, according to the minister, would implicate JM in a revolt against Kenyatta. JM confided to his friends about the plot and his inability to contact Kenyatta.

== Assassination ==
In February 1975, leaflets were printed in Nairobi claiming to support a new terrorist group, the "Maskini Liberation Organisation." The leaflets were signed with JM's name, and a bomb threat campaign was launched throughout the city, attributed to the Maskini Liberation Organisation. Several bombs were set off in the city, without fatalities but alarming the city and authorities. Several MPs including Njagi Mbarire and Maina Wanjigi questioned vice president Daniel Arap Moi about the group, and accused the government of creating both the organization and associated bombing campaign.

According to an investigative report by Kenya's newspaper of record the Daily Nation, Kenyatta's chief bodyguard Wanyoike Thungu organized a meeting of conspirators at the Midland Hotel in Nakuru on February 26, and at the Nakuru state house on February 27, placing JM on 24 hour surveillance until his successful assassination. On February 27, a friend of JM noted that JM was being trailed by the well-known police reservist Patrick Shaw. On February 28, JM decided not to board a bus he had planned to take to Mombasa; a bomb exploded on the bus, killing 27 people and injuring 100 more. GSU security commandant Ben Gethi convinced JM to meet with police informally on March 2 at the Nairobi Hilton Hotel, to explain his innocence in the Nairobi bombings, with Gethi promising to provide protection.

Witnesses observed many police and security officials at the Hilton on March 2, including Patrick Shaw, Ben Gethi, another police reservist identified as Mr. Young, CID police director Ignatius Nderi, National Youth Service deputy director Waruhiu Itote, police officer Pius Kibathi, and Olkejuado County Council Councillor John Mutung’u. When JM arrived at the Hilton just before 7pm, Gethi ushered him to a Peugeot station wagon behind the hotel. JM's white Mercedes Benz remained parked at the front of the Hilton until his family later recovered the vehicle.

The Daily Nation reported that Gethi drove JM to Kenya's "Special Branch" National Intelligence Service headquarters at Kingsway House in Muindi Mbingu Street. There, JM was brought to the office of an unnamed senior intelligence officer, where JM found Thungu, Nderi, Itote, and Shaw. After initial questioning, Thungu accused JM of publicly insulting Kenyatta in speeches across Kenya, of stealing scholarship money, and Itote accused JM of taking money from the Chinese government. Thungu struck JM, knocking out several teeth and leaving damage later seen in JM's postmortem examination. Gethi then shot JM in the arm, allegedly when JM tried to draw a pistol that Gethi himself had given him.

Thungu then called a senior politician, suspected by The Daily Nation of being Minister of State Mbiyu Koinange, and brought three men from an adjacent room, one of them the officer Pius Kibathi, according to a later confession by Gethi. These men handcuffed JM, loaded him into councillor John Mutung’u's green Peugeot, and took him to Ngong forest, where he was shot to death. On 2 March 1975, Kariuki's remains were discovered in Ngong Forest by a Maasai herder, Musaite ole Tunta. His body showed signs of mutilation, including the removal of his hands, damage to his eyes, and facial burns, and was found on an ant's nest. As of 2025, it remains unknown who fired the final, fatal shots killing JM.

When the news of Kariuki's death broke, University of Nairobi students marched in protest in the streets of the capital. The march was broken up by Kenyan riot police and the campus was closed down, not reopening during Kenyatta's lifetime.

== Book ==
Kariuki wrote Mau Mau Detainee, an account of his experience in camps during the uprising that led to Kenya's independence.

== Quotes ==
- "Kenya has become a nation of 10 millionaires and 10 million beggars."
- "Every Kenyan man, woman and child is entitled to a decent and just living. That is a birthright. It is not a privilege. He is entitled as far as is humanly possible to equal educational, job and health opportunities irrespective of his parentage, race or creed or his area of origin in this land. If that is so, deliberate efforts should be made to eliminate all obstacles that today stand in the way of this just goal. That is the primary task of the machinery called Government: our Government."
- "We fought for independence with sweat, blood and our lives. Many of us suffered for inordinate days – directly and indirectly. Many of us are orphans, widows and children as a result of the struggle. We must ask: What did we suffer for, and were we justified in that suffering?".
- "In Kenya today, I can only see the dawn of a June morning rising majestically from the white oblivion into the serenity of life." – J. M. Kariuki (1974)

== Death investigation ==
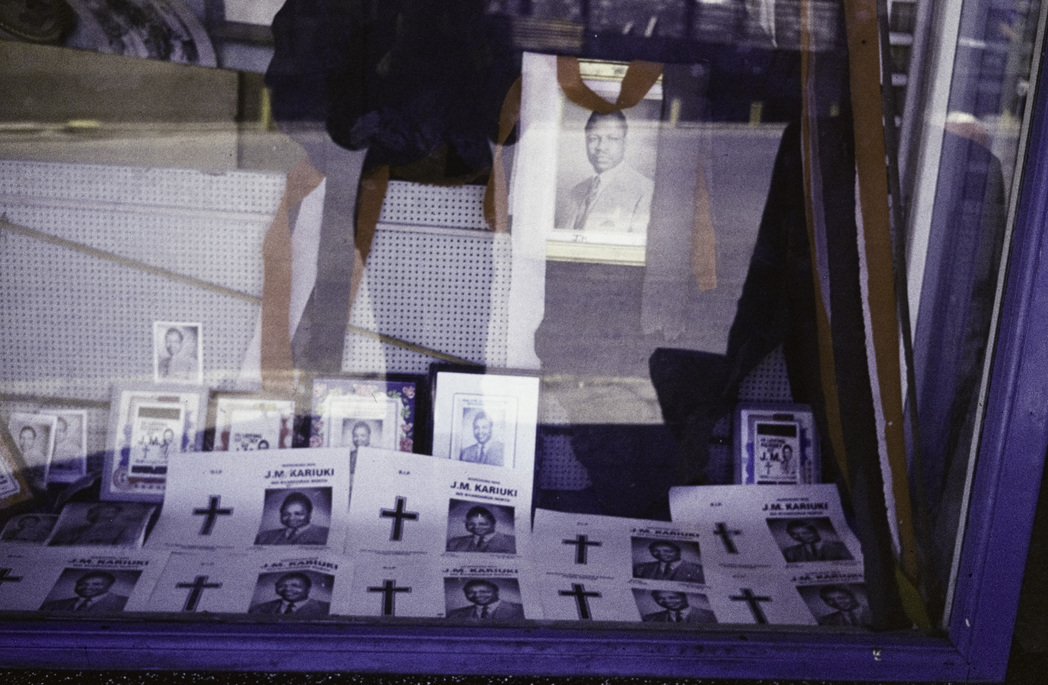
Mourning display for Kariuki. Nairobi, 1975.

A Parliamentary Select Committee chaired by Elijah Wasike Mwangale was immediately established to investigate the circumstances surrounding Kariuki's murder. The Committee's report assigned senior police officers: Ignatius Iriga Nderi, Ben Gethi, Wanyoike Thungu, Patrick Shaw and other senior administrative officers and politicians, but no one was ever punished. It is most likely that the committee was the means used by Kenyatta's government to mitigate a potential revolt. When the report was finally released, the anger had subsided and the likelihood of revolt was much lower.
