= Susan Oguya =

Businesswoman, designer and entrepreneur in Kenya

- Born: 1987 (age 38–39); Kenya
- Citizenship: Kenyan
- Education: Strathmore University (Bachelor of Science); Università Cattolica del Sacro Cuore (Master of Business Administration); Domus Academy (Master of Design)
- Occupation: Designer
- Years active: 2009–present
- Title: Founder and former COO of MFarm Kenya Limited

Susan Eve Oguya Kutalek, commonly known as Susan Oguya, is a businesswoman, designer and entrepreneur in Kenya. She is the co-founder and former chief operating officer of MFarm Kenya Limited, an internet-based company that facilitates farmers to find the best farm implements, seeds and access to weather reports and market information. Since August 2015, Oguya has worked as a senior designer at Dalberg Global Development Advisors, based in New York City.

== Background and education ==
Oguya was born in the western part of Kenya in 1987. She attended Kenyan schools for her pre-university studies. She was exposed to computers when one of her uncles, who was studying in the capital city of Nairobi, came home with his desktop during a vacation. Later, her uncle bought her a desktop of her own. She decided to study Information Technology at university. In 2010, she completed a four-year undergraduate course, graduating from Strathmore University, with a Bachelor of Science, majoring in Business Information Technology.

In 2013, she was admitted to the Università Cattolica del Sacro Cuore (Catholic University of the Sacred Heart), in Milan, Italy. After one year, she graduated with a Master of Business Administration. From there, she joined Domus Academy, also in Milan, where she studied design, graduating in 2015 with a Master of Design degree, majoring in Human Computer Interaction.

== Career ==
During her final year of undergraduate study, she worked as a Microsoft Student Partner. During the same time frame, she concurrently worked in the Student Enterprise Program, where she worked with stakeholders to produce educational, marketing and promotional material, in her capacity as communication and publicity manager. She worked briefly as a software developer for Safaricom, then as a research assistant at iHub Nairobi, a software development enterprise, before settling down at Akirachix, where she worked for one and half years as a training manager. There she trained young women ages 18 to 25 years in life skills and basic and mid-level computer competencies, including programming.

In 2010, motivated and angered by newspaper reports that middlemen were exploiting rural farmers, she and two other collaborators co-founded MFarm Kenya Limited, with Oguya working as chief technology officer, responsible for coding, testing and troubleshooting the mobile app, from October 2010 until July 2012. She spent the next two years developing and strengthening the business application of the app, by interacting with clients, funders, business partners and coders, in her capacity as chief operating officer of MFarm Kenya Limited. As of December 2012, the company had 18 full-time employees and over 7,000 clients regionally. In 2015 when she completed graduate school in Italy, she relocated to the United States, working as a senior designer at Dalberg Global Development Advisors, based in New York, New York since August 2015.

== Other considerations ==
In 2014, Forbes magazine listed Oguya among the "10 Female Tech Founders To Watch In Africa".
