= Ikal Angelei =

Kenyan politician and environmentalist

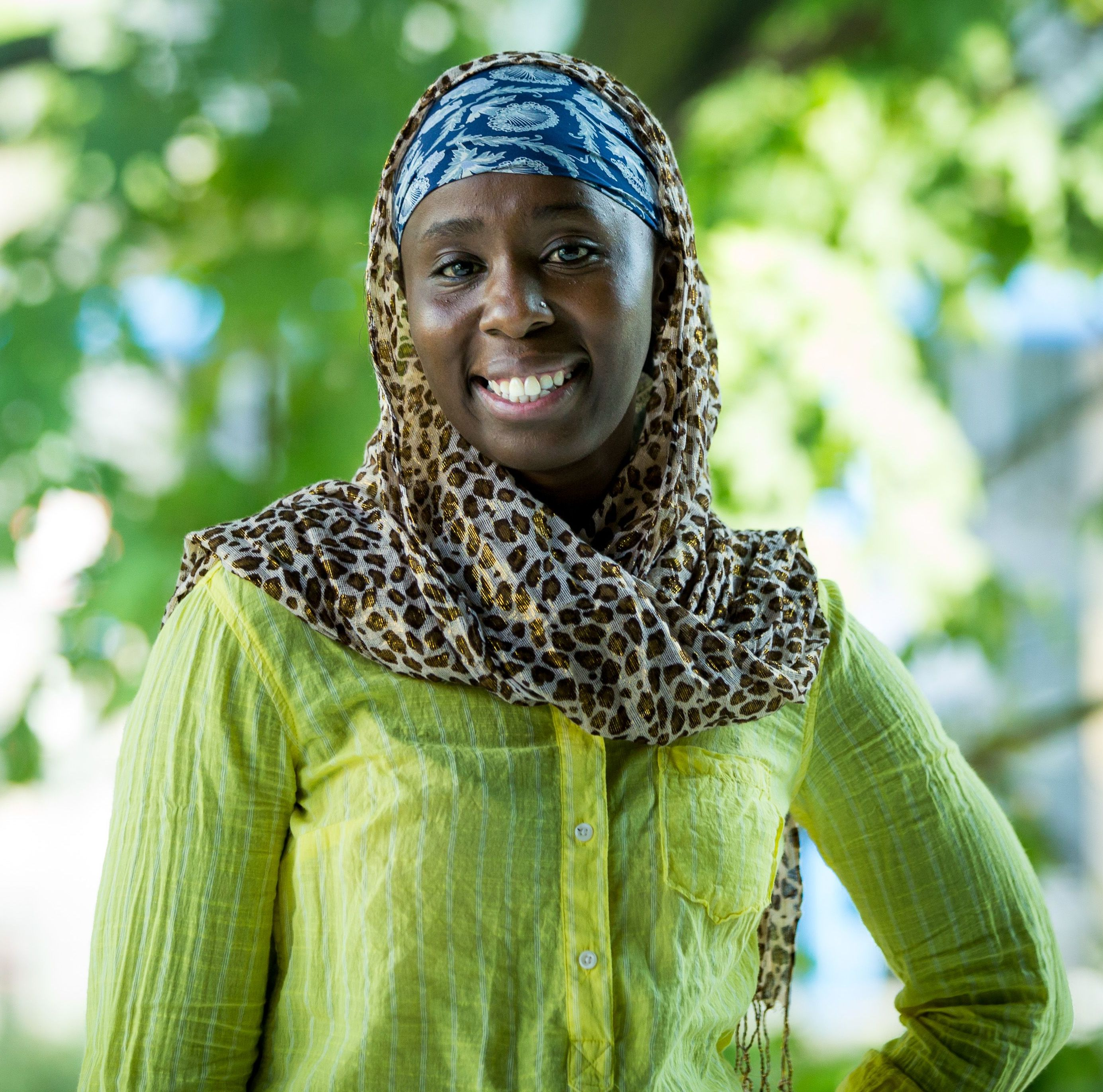
- Ikal Angelei, 2017
- Born: Kitale, Kenya
- Citizenship: Kenyan
- Education: University of Nairobi; State University of New York at Stony Brook
- Occupations: Environmentalist; Politician
- Organization: Friends of Lake Turkana
- Known for: Environmental advocacy; opposing the Gilgel Gibe III Dam; founding Friends of Lake Turkana
- Awards: Goldman Environmental Prize (2012)

Ikal Angelei is a Kenyan politician and environmentalist. She was born in Kitale. She was awarded the Goldman Environmental Prize in 2012, in particular for her voicing of environmental implications of the Gilgel Gibe III Dam, speaking on behalf of Kenyan indigenous communities. She is the founder of the organisation Friends of Lake Turkana which campaigns for environmental justice in the region around the Lake Turkana.

== Education and Career ==
Ikal Angelei holds a Bachelor of Commerce degree from University of Nairobi. She also earned a Master's degree in Public Policy from the State University of New York at Stony Brook.

She is a Kenyan environmental and community right advocates. Her work centers on environmental and natural resources governance, community mobilization, and advocacy. In 2008, she founded Friends of Lake Turkana (FoLT) .

== Awards ==
Angelei was awarded the Goldman Environmental Prize in 2012.
