= Gladys Ngetich =

Kenyan engineer specializing in aerospace engineering

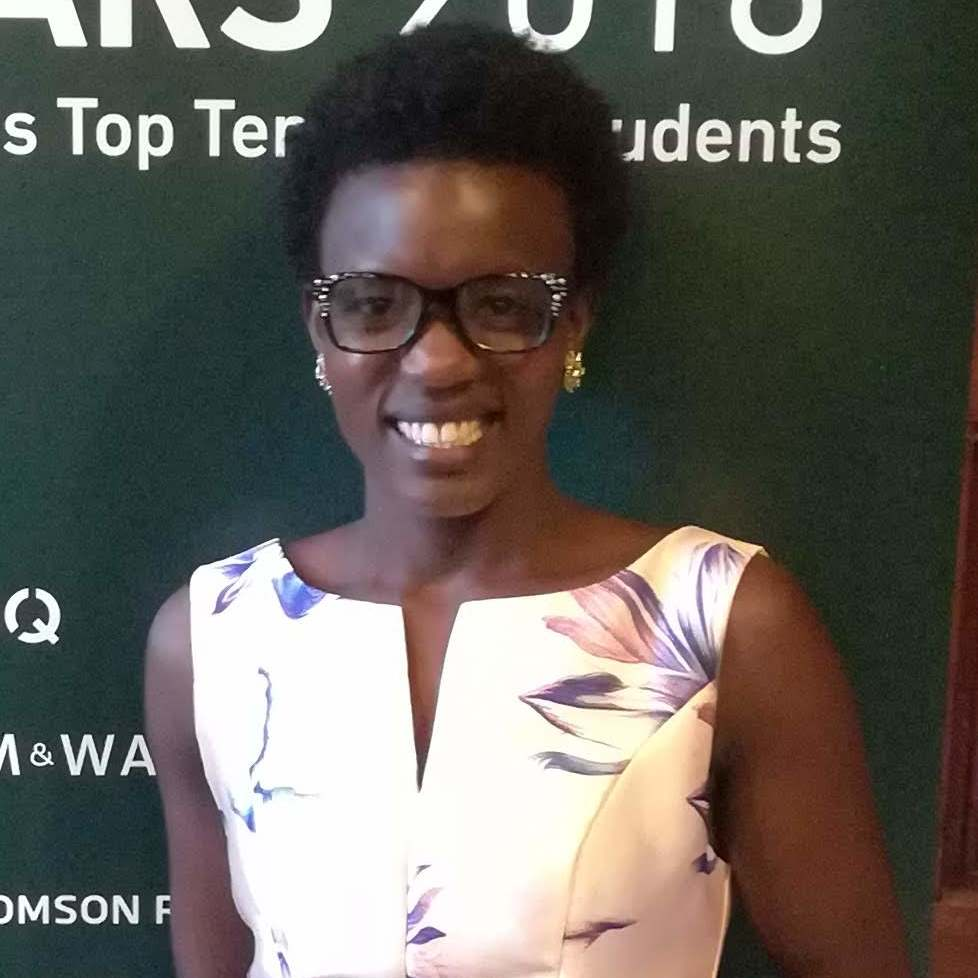
- Ngetich at the Rare Rising Award ceremony
- Born: 1991 (age 34–35); Amalo Village, Nakuru County, Kenya
- Citizenship: Kenya
- Education: Jomo Kenyatta University of Agriculture and Technology (Bachelor of Science in Mechanical Engineering); University of Oxford (Doctor of Philosophy in Aerospace Engineering) (in progress)
- Occupations: Engineering tutor & doctoral student

Gladys Chepkirui Ngetich (born c.1991) is a Kenyan engineer and a Rhodes scholar, pursuing a doctorate degree in aerospace engineering at the University of Oxford, in the United Kingdom. She is the recipient of the Tanenbaum Fellowship and the Babaroa Excellence Award.

== Background and education ==
Ngetich was born in Amalo Village, Nakuru County. She attended Lelaibei Primary School in Olenguruone. She studied at Mercy Girls' Secondary School in Kericho. She was admitted to the Jomo Kenyatta University of Agriculture and Technology, graduating with a Bachelor of Science degree in mechanical engineering, in 2013.

In 2015, Ngetich joined the University of Oxford on a Rhodes Scholarship to pursue a doctoral degree in Aerospace Engineering. In 2016, she earned a Tanenbaum Fellowship, an annual fellowship awarded to Rhodes scholars for a multifaceted program in Israel. In 2018, Ngetich was named a Skoll World Forum Fellow for the work she is doing in Kenya to empower girls and women. She also tutors engineering undergraduate students at Oriel College.

== Awards and recognition ==
In 2018, Ngetich was credited with a patent in collaboration with Rolls-Royce Plc. Her research work has been featured in BBC Science and the Oxford Science Blog and Medium. She received the ASME IGTI Young Engineer Turbo Expo Participation Award for her paper at the 2018 Annual American Society of Mechanical Engineers (ASME) conference.

Ngetich is the co-founder of the ILUU, a Nairobi-based non-profit that aims to inspire girls and women.

In September 2018, Business Daily Africa named Ngitech among its "Top 40 Under 40 Women in Kenya in 2018". In 2019 she started investigating sustainable space science technologies using a Schmidt Science Fellowship.

As of 2023, she is involved in satellite and rocket fuel research at Massachusetts Institute of Technology.
