= 2013 Kirinyaga local elections =

Local elections in Kenya

Local elections were held in Kirinyaga to elect a Governor and County Assembly on 4 March 2013. Under the new constitution, which was passed in a 2010 referendum, the 2013 general elections were the first in which Governors and members of the County Assemblies for the newly created counties were elected. They will also be the first general elections run by the Independent Electoral and Boundaries Commission(IEBC) which has released the official list of candidates.

== Gubernatorial election ==
Candidate	Running Mate	Coalition	Party	Votes
Kagai, Bedan Muriithi	Karuri, Rev. Joyce Gaturi		Grand National Union	--
Kibicho, James Kareu	Njuki, Joseph Nduku		NARC–Kenya	--
Kiragu, John Mwangi	Maina, David Njoroge		Agano Party	--
Ndathi, Joseph Kathuri	Njiri, Julius Muthike		The National Alliance	--
Nyagah, James Munyambu	Miano, Joseph Murithi		Democratic Party	--

== Prospective candidates ==
The following are some of the candidates who have made public their intentions to run:

- Njeru Githae - Finance minister
- Joseph Ndathi - former director in charge of administration in the Ministry of Foreign Affairs
- James Kibicho - former Ndia Constituency MP (NARC–Kenya)
- John Kiragu - businessman (NARC–Kenya)
- James Nyaga - former managing director of Kenya Planters Cooperative Union, (Democratic Party)
- Bedan Kagai - Grand National Union
