= Kenya–United States relations =

- Kenya: United States

Diplomatic mission
- Kenyan Embassy, Washington, D.C.: United States Embassy, Nairobi

Envoy
- Ambassador Robinson Njeru Githae: Chargé d'affaires Marc Dillard

Kenya–United States relations are bilateral relations between the Republic of Kenya and the United States. Kenya and the United States have long been close allies and have enjoyed cordial relations since Kenya's independence. Relations became even closer after Kenya's democratic transition of 2002 and subsequent improvements in human rights.

This was preceded by sometimes frosty interludes during Kenyan President Moi's regime when the two countries often clashed over bad governance issues, resulting in aid suspension and many diplomatic rows. Following the election of the new government of Uhuru Kenyatta in 2013, relations somewhat took a dip when the new president forged a new foreign policy looking east away from traditional western allies. Kenya–United States relations have been improved through cooperation against terrorism and a visit by U.S. President Barack Obama to Kenya, which is the homeland of his father.

Kenya's athletic mastery of some auspicious American events such as the Boston Marathon and New York Marathon have increased ordinary Americans' consciousness of Kenya paving the way for a warm mutual regard between the two peoples. An attack on Kenya by Al-Qaeda in 1998, as well as subsequent attacks by Al-Shabaab, has drawn the two countries politically closer due to the shared fate the U.S. has had of similar targeting in the September 11 attacks by Al-Qaeda in Lower Manhattan and The Pentagon.

== History ==
=== Independence ===
After Kenya's independence on 12 December 1963, the United States immediately recognized the new nation. However, it was not until 2 March 1964 that diplomatic relations were established with William Atwood establishing the U.S. Embassy at Nairobi. The United States also provided the fledgling nation with $21 million in funds and technical aid, with Kenya seeking more loans from the United States.

The United States soon found itself invested in Kenyan politics due to the power struggle between Tom Mboya and Jaramogi Oginga Odinga. The United States had been impressed by Mboya since the 1950s, and sought to empower him in the new administration instead of the more leftist Odinga. The United States was successful, and Mboya began wooing Kenya's prime minister Jomo Kenyatta into becoming more favorable with the United States and the CIA.

=== Cold War ===
After Odinga's fall from power, Kenya found itself squarely in the Western bloc during the Cold War period. The fact that Soviet ideals never gained traction in post-independence Kenya meant that there was little to no jockeying between the United States and the U.S.S.R. in this region. This meant there was little need for Kenya and United States relations, since the United States took Kenyan support for granted.

However, the 1980s saw Kenya become more involved in Cold War politics. After Jomo Kenyatta's death, the new president of Kenya Daniel arap Moi sought to further strengthen relations with the United States Moi joined the United States' Rapid Deployment Joint Task Force, allowing for the construction of United States military installations in Kenya. The most notable development of this military construction was allowing United States naval access to Mombasa, which resulted in the United States paying Kenya $26 million.

=== Democratization Era ===
Good relations, however, fell into jeopardy with the deteriorating civil rights picture in Kenya. In 1987, the chairman of the Congress subcommittee on Africa, Michigan congressman Howard Wolpe, accused Daniel arap Moi of bankrolling criminals and committing human rights abuses. The issue was then placed on the agenda for Ronald Reagan's talks with Moi, but nothing came of it at this time. In 1991, however, the United States joined with a coalition of other nations who gave financial assistance to Kenya to pressure for reforms. In a 1991 meeting in Paris, Kenya's aid donors insisted on ending corruption and human rights abuses, threatening to pull their aid. These concerns caused the United States to suspend its aid in 1992. Even when United States pressure forced multiparty elections in 1992, relations were tense all throughout the 1990s due to international discontent with the tactics of the Moi regime.

The United States reacted positively to the Kenyan elections of 2000, the first democratic transition of power in Kenya's history. The new president, Mwai Kibaki was honored as the first African head of state to be invited to Washington D.C. for a state visit.

=== War on terror ===
On 7 August 1998, al Qaeda terrorists detonated a car bomb outside the United States embassy in Nairobi, Kenya, leaving 200 dead and thousands wounded. The immediate aftermath strained relations between the United States and Kenya, as Kenyans felt that the United States only cared about the Americans who lost their lives, not the Kenyans. The situation was worsened when the American ambassador, Prudence Bushnell, implied that Kenyans were attempting to loot the embassy.

However, since that event, the Kenyan and U.S. governments have intensified cooperation to address all forms of insecurity in Kenya, including terrorism. The United States provides equipment and training to Kenyan security forces, both civilian and military. In its dialog with the Kenyan Government, the United States urges effective action against corruption and insecurity as the two greatest impediments to Kenya achieving sustained, rapid economic growth.

Families and victims of the attack have severally appealed to the Kenyan government to petition the U.S. government to compensate them. A Kenyan journalist who resides in the U.S. has on several occasions castigated the U.S. government for its nonchalant approach to the issue. In an article titled "The Big Bloody Burden of The Big Brother" published by the Daily Nation, one of the two mainstream Kenyan Newspapers, the writer, Ben Mutua Jonathan Muriithi wondered why "the Obama administration and others before it had turned a blind eye yet it was clear that Kenya had suffered as a Collateral damage".

Following the September 11th attacks, Kenya was designated as a frontline in the United States' "War on terrorism". Kenya's National Security Intelligence Service (NSIS) received a list of two hundred suspects linked to Al-Qaeda in late September 2001. Following Al-Qaeda attacks in Mombasa in 2002, new president Mwai Kibaki created the Anti-Terrorism Police Unit to further counter-terror operations. The United States Anti-Terrorism Assistance Program provided training to 500 Kenyan security officers in the United States and many more in East Africa training locations.

The United States also sunk large amounts of money into non-governmental organizations (NGOs) operating in Kenya. This was part of an overall emphasis placed on international NGOs during the war on terror that saw United States funding to NGOs increase by billions. However, this particularly affected Kenya due to the high quantity of aid the United States sends to Kenya. This period also saw a "blurring of lines" in regards to NGOs, as it became more common for NGOs in Kenya to work with military officials in the United States Department of Defense.

Even as Kibaki cooperated, relations suffered due to the United States' perceived "obsession" with the war on terror and concerns that alignment with the United States led to domestic terrorism. Kenyan policymakers feared that while the United States had encouraged democratization, they ceased to encourage democracy during the war on terror. International organizations said American policy is pushing Kenya to discriminate against its Muslim population.

Another key aspect of the war on terror was that American aid to Kenya became even more politicized and "securitized." During this period, The United States heavily tied USAID support directly to military and counterterror operations undertaken by the Kenyan Defense Forces. The United States also demonstrated a willingness to play hardball, sometimes threatening to cut aid if Kenya does not support United States foreign policy on the international level.

Nonetheless, Kenya continues to back counter-terror operations in exchange for financial support.

The United States is urging Kenyan President William Ruto to address claims of extrajudicial killings and abductions by police during protests that started in June 2024. US Senator Chris Murphy highlighted the importance of accountability during his visit to Kenya. These protests have resulted in approximately 60 deaths and over 60 disappearances, though no police officers have been prosecuted so far, despite ongoing investigations.

=== Modern Era ===
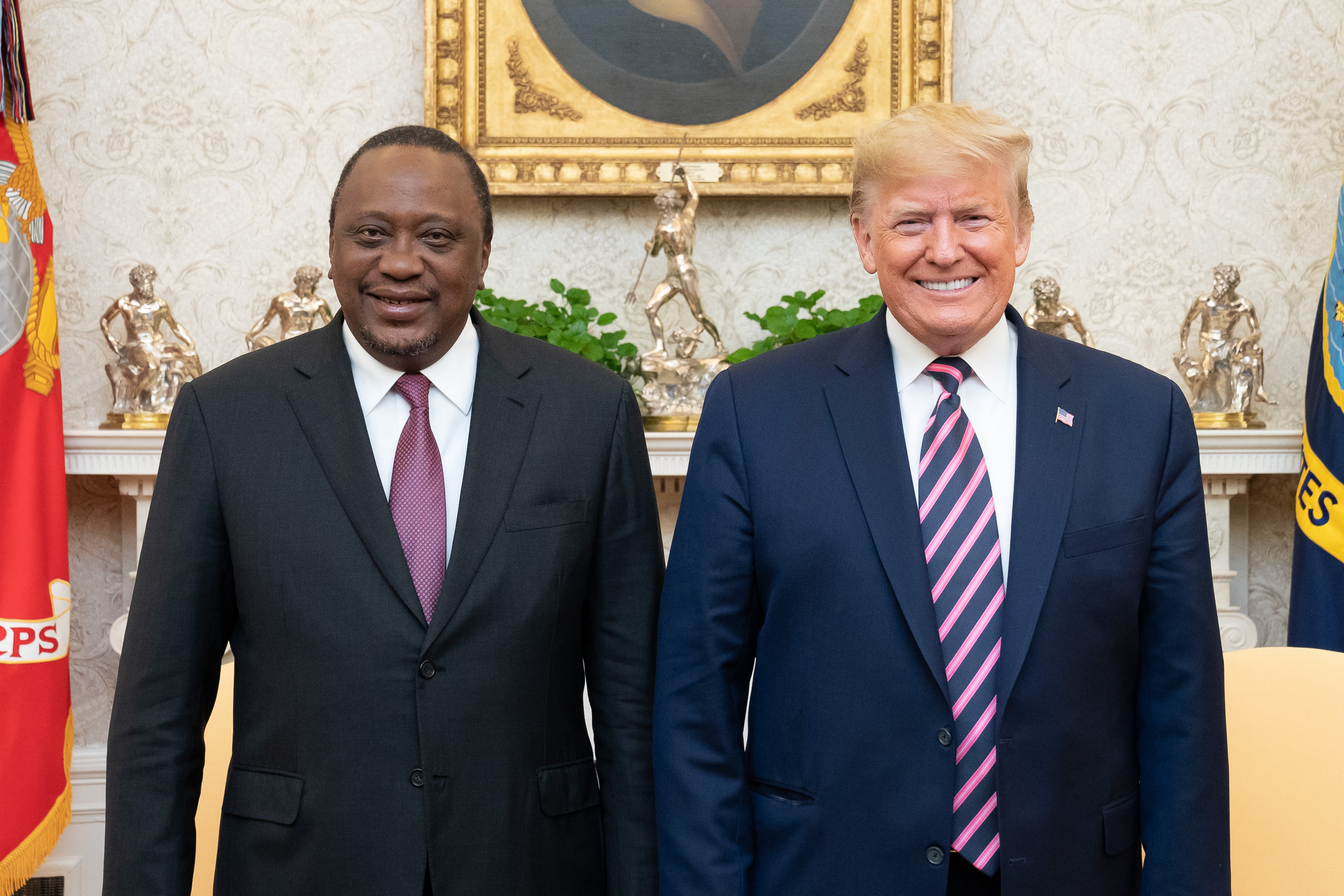
U.S. President Donald Trump and Kenyan President Uhuru Kenyatta at the White House in February 2020

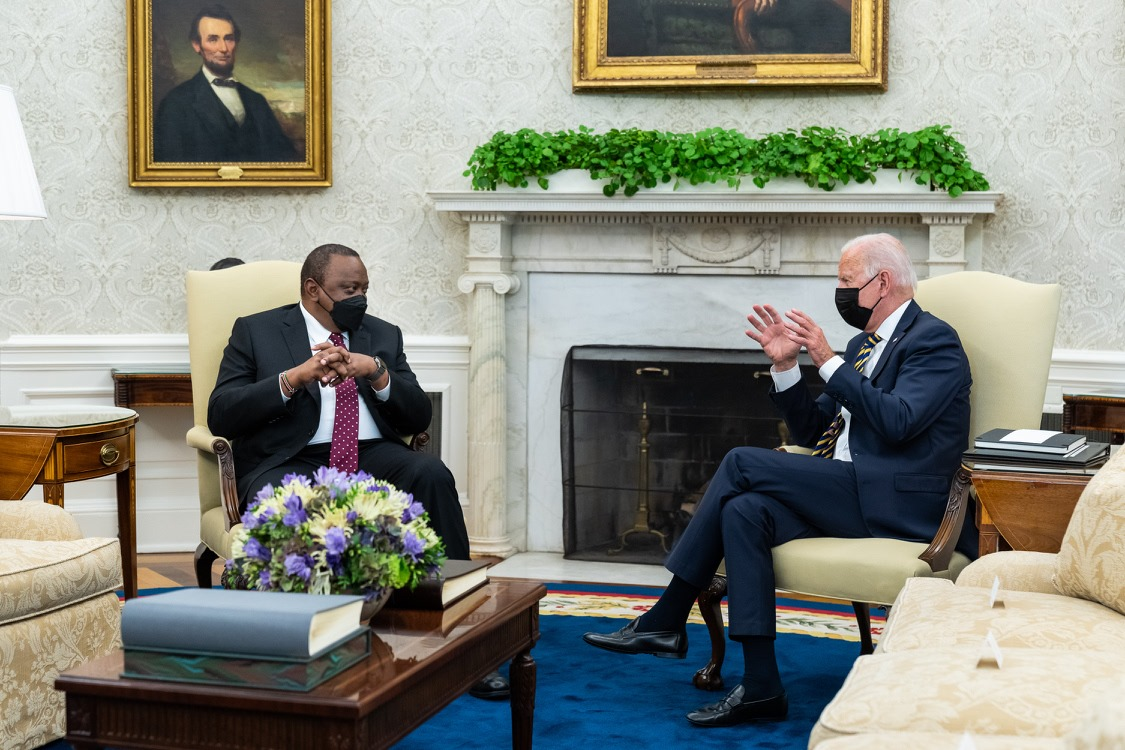
U.S. President Joe Biden met with Kenyan President Uhuru Kenyatta in the Oval Office of the White House in October 2021

The United States became a talking point during Kenya's 2007 elections, as some believed they were supporting Raila Odinga as retaliation for Kibaki reducing Kenyan dependence on the United States. Following the violence caused by Kenya's 2007 elections, the United States and other Western nations pressured Kenya to create tribunals to punish those responsible for the violence. The United States initially threatened to pull its aid unless the violence was addressed, but political will for such a step waned throughout the year. The tribunals were never established, but the United States was satisfied by the peaceful elections in 2013.

The election of Barack Obama in 2008 was greeted with great optimism from Kenya, who felt pride in him due to his Kenyan father. His Africa policy was based on four pillars—promoting democracy, managing conflicts, strengthening the economy, and providing access to education. That said, he also continued many of President George W. Bush's policies, particularly in counterterrorism. President Obama was also the first sitting president to visit Kenya.

The election of Barack Obama also brought back international discourse regarding Kenya's Mau Mau uprising, as Obama's father had been interned by the British for his Mau Mau alignment. While this was a non-issue in Kenya, it put some domestic pressure on Obama to distance himself from his Kenyan heritage. However, Barack Obama has always been explicit that Kenya should expect no favors from him due to his heritage. Despite concerns regarding favoritism, the Obama administration did not take a more active role in Kenyan politics like some expected.

The Obama era also saw U.S. assistance to Kenya grew "exponentially," as the U.S. Agency for International Development (USAID) put in a 2012 document. The number of USAID projects had grown significantly enough for the agency to justify hiring additional contractors to help it manage its Kenyan program portfolio. A Statement of Work for the support initiative acknowledged that "the level of U.S.-financed Kenyan operations has outpaced Washington's ability to adequately manage it." Additionally, USAID has faced academic criticism for backing projects that mostly benefit the rich of the Kenya.

The 2013 elections in Kenya brought controversy due to the words of the United States Assistant Secretary of State at the time, Johnnie Carson. While not endorsing a candidate, he stated that "actions have consequences," implying opposition to the challenger, Uhuru Kenyatta. The Kenyatta presidency was notably cold towards the United States prior to the terrorist attack on Kenya's Westgate mall. The terrorist attack led to more cooperation, as Kenya focused more on counterterror operations.

The 2016 election of President Donald Trump did not bring similar enthusiasm to Kenyans.

During the Presidency of Joe Biden, Kenya has participated in the Ukraine Defense Contact Group and Operation Prosperity Guardian, a military task force meant defense international shipping in the Red Sea from Houthi attacks. The U.S. has also supported and funded a Kenya-led operation to send over 1,000 police forces to Haiti amidst a crisis in the country.

In May 2024, a U.S. official announced President Biden's intent to declare Kenya as a major non-NATO ally, a move meant to display the president's commitment to Africa, where countries like Russia and China have been competing for influence. Biden later announced that he was working with Congress to designate the country as such. On 22 May, Biden said: "We are launching a new era of economic cooperation between Kenya and America." The U.S. International Development Finance Corporation is set to announce investments into Kenya's green energy and health, and a plan to cut the country's debt, bringing the institution's total investments into Kenya to US$1.1 billion.

In December 2025, Kenya signed an agreement with the United States over health care assistance. As part of the deal, Kenya will get a package worth more than $1.6 billion and is obligated to increase its own healthcare spending in return. This deal was part of a larger effort by the Trump administration to procure bilateral aid agreements that differ from the multilateral approach taken by the World Health Organization and differ from traditional USAID delivery methods. The United States has signed similar deals with 16 other African countries as of March 2026.

== Visits ==
Secretary of State Hillary Clinton visited Nairobi in 2009 and 2012 and Secretary of State John Kerry also visited in 2015.

Vice President Joe Biden visited Nairobi in 2010.

President Barack Obama, whose father is a Kenyan native, became the first U.S. President to visit Kenya when he visited Nairobi in 2015 where he co-hosted the Global Entrepreneurship Summit 2015 with President Uhuru Kenyatta. Uhuru Kenyatta has visited the U.S. on several occasions whilst president. Former presidents Daniel Moi and Mwai Kibaki also visited the U.S. on several occasions.

First Lady of the United States, Melania Trump, visited Kenya in October 2018, to promote health and education initiatives

Kenyan President William Ruto and his wife, Rachel, made a three-day state visit to the U.S. in May 2024, where a state dinner with President Joe Biden was prepared for them. It was the first state visit by a Kenyan leader in two decades and by an African leader in over 15 years.

== Resident diplomatic missions ==
of Kenya in the United States

- Washington, D.C. (Embassy)
- Los Angeles (Consulate-General)
- New York City (Consulate-General)

of the United States in Kenya

- Nairobi (Embassy)

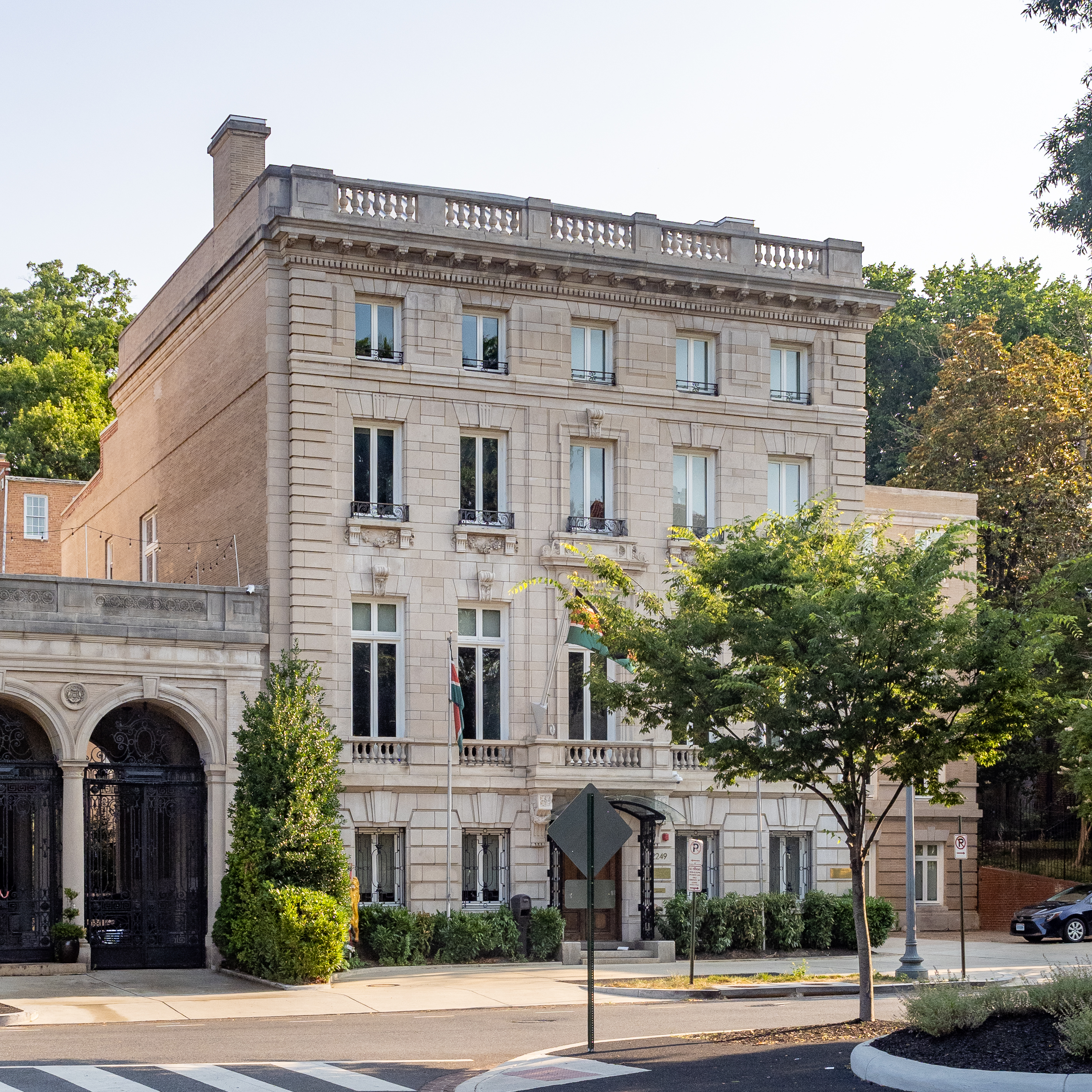
Embassy of Kenya in Washington, D.C.

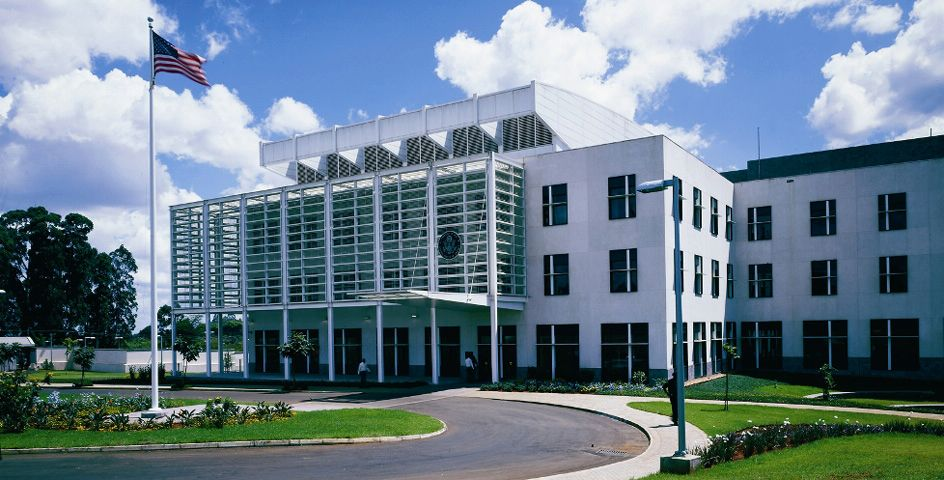
Embassy of the United States in Nairobi

== Public opinion ==
In a 2013 BBC World Service poll, 69% of Kenyans view U.S. influence positively, with 11% viewing U.S. influence negatively.

In 2007, according to the Pew Research Global Attitudes Project, 87% of Kenyans viewed the U.S. favorably, decreasing slightly down to 83% in 2011 and 81% in 2013. The 2012 U.S. Global Leadership Report indicated that 68% of Kenyans approve of U.S. leadership, with 14% disapproving and 18% uncertain. According to a 2026 Pew Research Center survey, 63% of Kenyans had a favorable view of the United States, while 35% had a negative view.

== Gallery ==
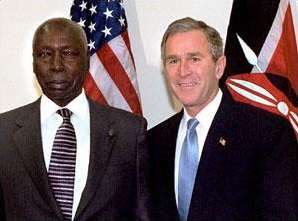
Daniel arap Moi, Kenya's second President, and George W. Bush.

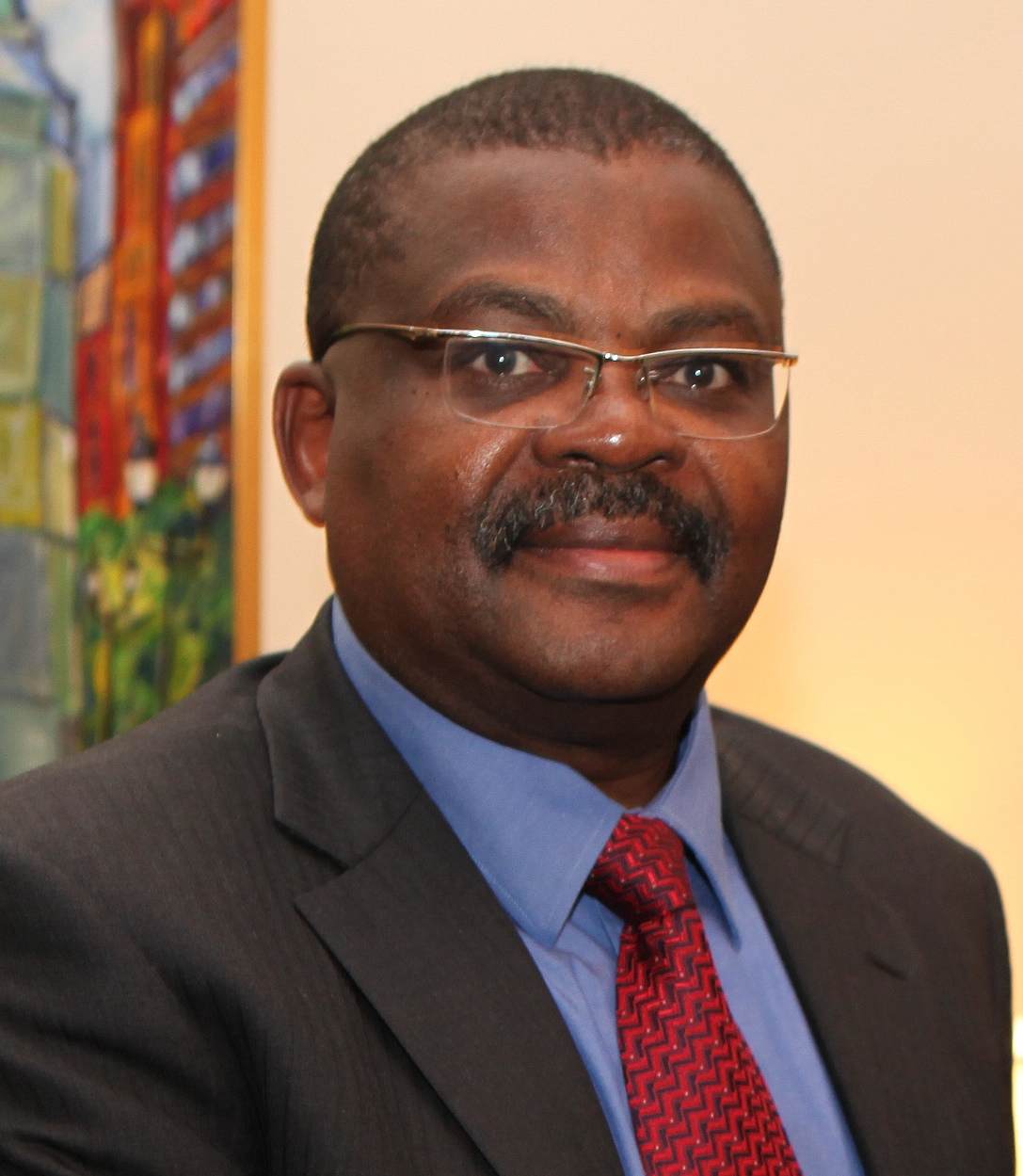
Robinson Njeru Githae, Kenya's current ambassador to the US.

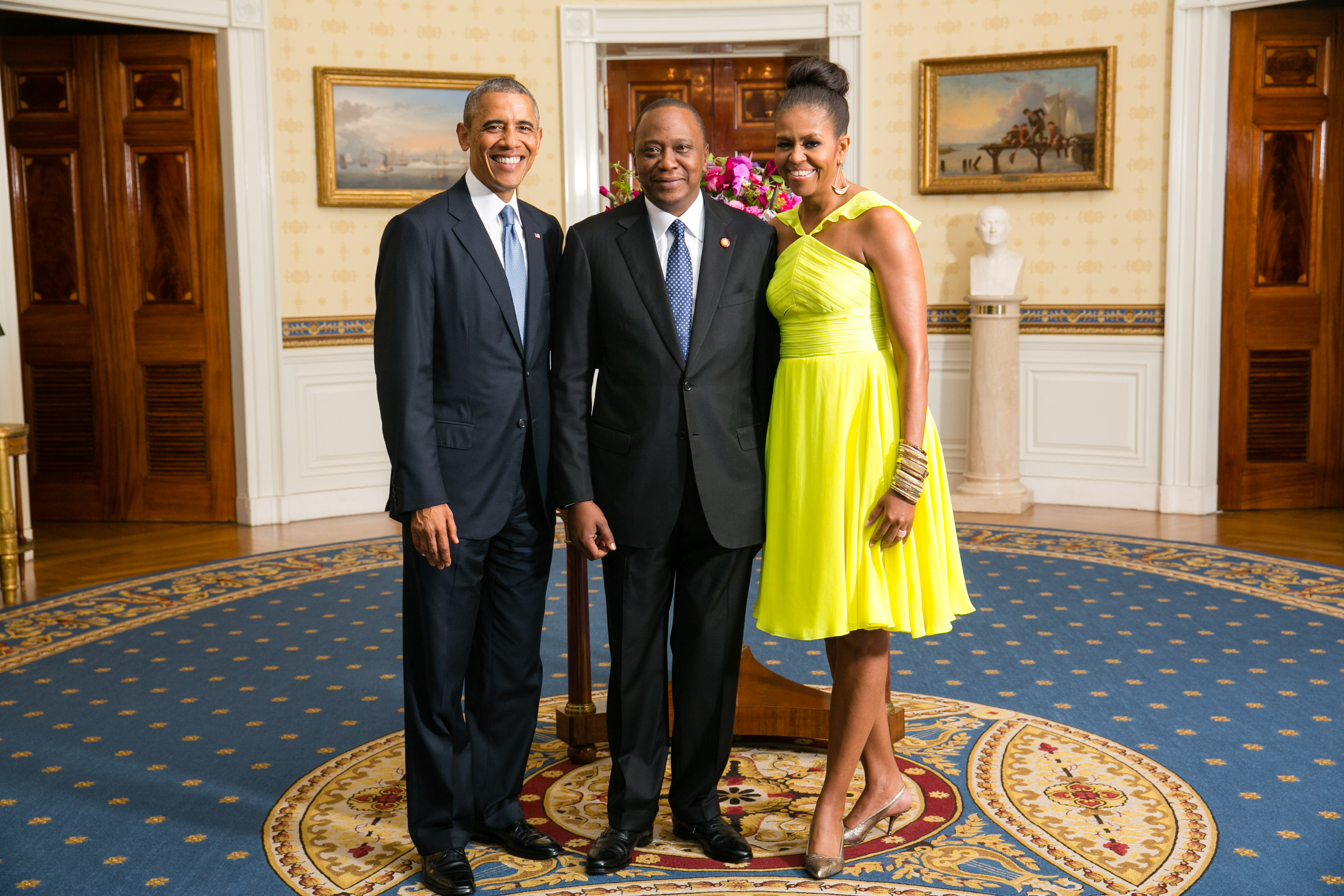
President Uhuru Kenyatta, with the Obamas.

== See also ==
- Kenyan Americans
- Foreign relations of the United States
- Foreign relations of Kenya
