= David Wasawo =

Kenyan zoologist and conservationist

- Professor Wasawo c. 1969
- Born: 17 May 1923; Gem, Siaya County, Kenya
- Died: 4 February 2014 (aged 90); Nairobi
- Education: Makerere University; University of Oxford; University of London; Maseno School; Alliance High School
- Awards: Elder of the Order of the Burning Spear
- Scientific career
- Fields: Zoology
- Workplaces: Makerere University; University of Nairobi; Great Lakes University of Kisumu

Professor David Peter Simon Wasawo (17 May 1923 – 4 February 2014) was a Kenyan zoologist, conservationist, and university administrator. After studying at Uganda's Makerere University he earned an M.A. at the University of Oxford and a PhD at University of London. He taught at Makerere University, and was Professor and Dean of the Faculty of Science at the University of Nairobi, and later chancellor of Great Lakes University of Kisumu.

He was the first East African to receive a degree in science, and taught several prominent East African academics. His research subjects included the marbled lungfish and oligochaete worms, and he later served as science advisor, director, and consultant to several international development organizations. He was awarded honorary Doctor of Science degrees from Kenyatta University and the University of Nairobi and was commended to Elder of the Order of the Burning Spear by the Kenyan government.

== Early life and education ==
Professor Wasawo was born 17 May 1923 in Gem, Siaya County, Kenya, to parents Petro (Peter) Onyango Osare and Ana Omondi, a family of Kenyan Luo. He entered Maseno School in 1937 and attended Alliance High School from 1942 to 1943, where he was taught by mathematician Edward Carey Francis, who later, when asked who was the most brilliant student he had ever taught, answered "Far and away, David Wasawo".

Professor Wasawo entered Makerere University, Uganda, in 1944, which at the time only granted diplomas not degrees. He focused in biology and excelled in his studies, and the Principal of Makerere provided full support for Professor Wasawo to attend Oxford University in England. He received the degree of Master of Arts in Zoology in 1951 becoming the first East African to be awarded a degree in science.

== Academia ==
In 1952 Professor Wasawo returned to Makerere where he joined as faculty member, becoming the first African teacher in the Faculty of Science (only four other Africans taught at Makerere at the time, in different departments). Between 1952 and 1965 Wasawo served as lecturer, then Head of the Zoology Department and Vice Principal (1962–1965) at Makerere, becoming the first East African to hold the post of Vice Principal at that institution. His students included Joseph M. Mungai and Frederick Kayanja, who both became notable physicians. In his autobiography, Mungai calls Wasawo a role model and a primary motivation for attending Makerere, writing: "Wasawo was reckoned to be the most brilliant scholar to have come from Kenya then." Wasawo earned a PhD from the University of London in 1959.

In 1965, Professor Wasawo joined the administration of the University of Nairobi, serving as Deputy Principal from 1965 to 1970. He was Professor and Dean of the Faculty of Science until his retirement in 1971.

== Later years ==
Professor Wasawo retired from the University of Nairobi in 1971, and began several decades of government and administrative work with national and international organizations. He was scientific advisor to UNESCO in Tanzania from 1971 to 1973, where he aided in establishing the Tanzania Scientific Research Council. He served as vice president of the International Union for Conservation of Nature (IUCN) from 1972 to 1974, and chief of the Natural Resources Division of the United Nations Economic Commission for Africa from 1973 to 1979. From 1979 to 1982 he was Managing Director of the Lake Basin Development Authority, and from 1982 to 1986 was development adviser in the Ministry of Energy and Regional Development.

From 1987 onward he was a development consultant to agencies including United Nations Environment Programme (UNEP), Gesellschaft für Technische Zusammenarbeit (GTZ), Intergovernmental Authority on Development (IGADD), Food and Agriculture Organization (FAO), the World Bank, and The African Institute for Policy Analysis. He returned to the University of Nairobi in 1998, where he was appointed Chair of the University of Nairobi Council until 2005, and from 2006 to 2013 was Chancellor of Great Lakes University of Kisumu (GLUK).

Professor Wasawo died at Aga Khan University Hospital in Nairobi on 4 February 2014, at the age of 90. Upon his death, former Prime Minister Raila Odinga called Wasawo Kenya's first African professor, "an icon who promoted science-based education and lifted the country’s reputation internationally from early days of independence." Senator Peter Anyang' Nyong'o said Professor Wasawo "set the standard of academic excellence which has never been broken". GLUK professor Dan Kaseje said Professor Wasawo established himself as not only East Africa’s "father of science" but also "the father of Professors". Professor Shellemiah O. Keya, chancellor of Dedan Kimathi University of Technology, called Professor Wasawo "a hero in the academia described as a giant among giants, a professor among professors, a rare individual distinguished by his great humility and simplicity."

== Personal life ==
Professor Wasawo was married to Ruth P. Lusinde, and had two sons and two daughters. He was a friend of Tom Mboya, a leader in the Kenya independence movement, and was best man at Mboya's 1962 wedding.

== Honors ==
Professor Wasawo received honorary degrees from Kenyatta University (1993) and the University of Nairobi (1999), each of which awarded him the degree of Doctor of Science. He was also awarded Elder of the Order of the Burning Spear (EBS) for his role in development of education.

== Publications ==
- Wasawo, D. P. S.; Visser, S. A. (1959). "Swampworms and tussock mounds in the swamps of Teso, Uganda". The East African Agricultural Journal. 25 (2): 86–90. doi:10.1080/03670074.1959.11665243. (with S. A. Visser)
- "A dry season burrow of Protopterus aethiopicus Heckel". Revue de Zoologie et de Botanique Africaines. 60: 65–70. 1959.
- Wasawo, David P.S. (1962). "The taxonomic position of Alma worthingtoni Stephenson". Journal of Natural History. Series 13. 5 (50): 113–120. doi:10.1080/00222936208651222.
- "Some arboricolous Oligochaeta of Ivory Coast". Memorie del Museo Stor Nat Verona. 11: 211–222. 1963. (with P. Omodeo)
- Wasawo, David P. S. (1966). "Developing the academic spirit in East Africa". Bulletin of the Atomic Scientists. 22 (8): 19–21. Bibcode:1966BuAtS..22h..19W. doi:10.1080/00963402.1966.11454973.
- "Quality of life in different cultures". IUCN Publications. New Series. 28: 47–54. 1973.
