= List of ambassadors of Kenya to the United States =

Coordinates: 38°54′46.1″N 77°3′1″W

Ambassador of Kenya to the United States Embassy of Kenya in Washington, D.C.
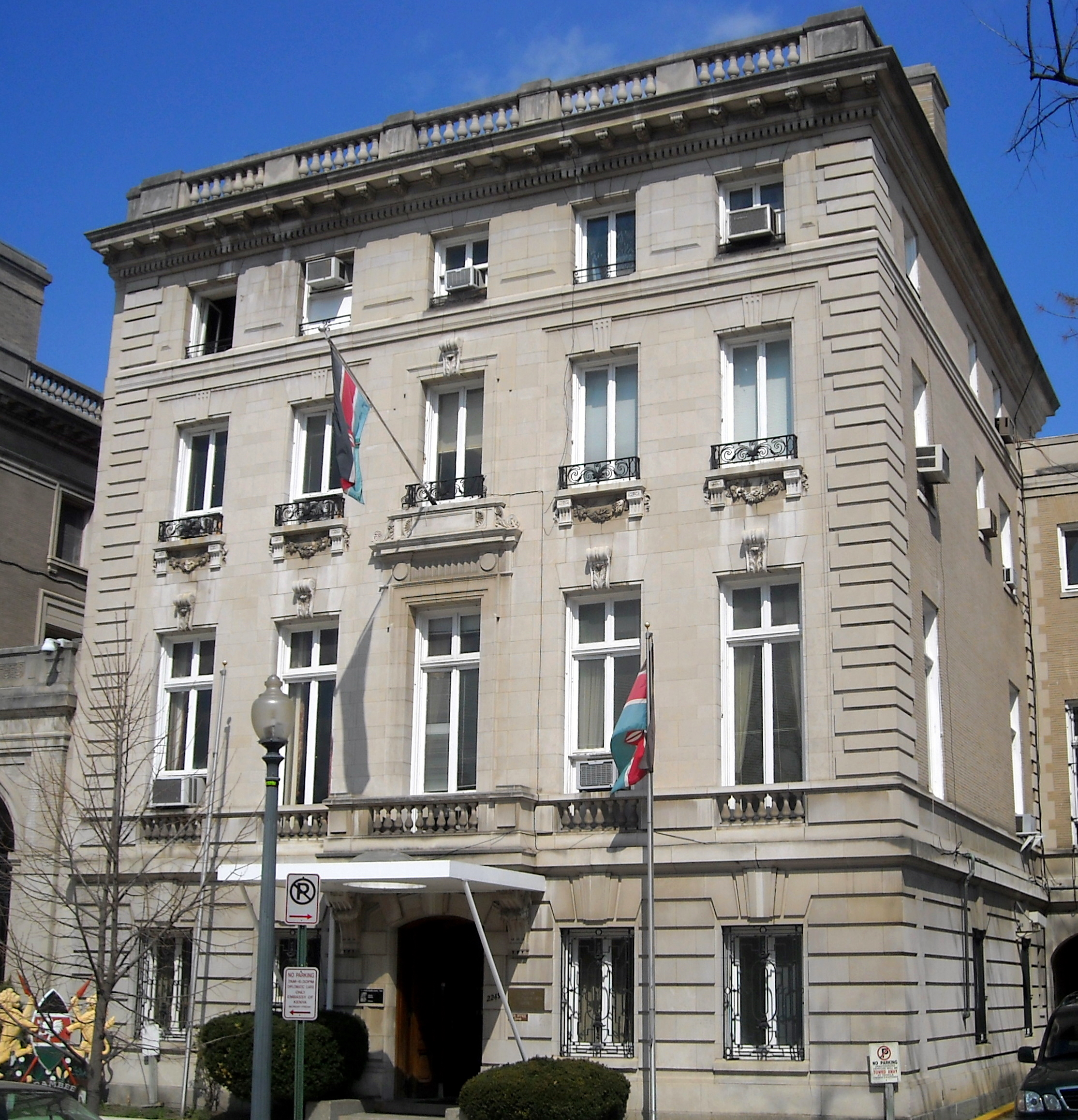
- Incumbent; Robinson Njeru Githae since November 18, 2014
- Inaugural holder: Burudi Nabwera
- Formation: April 8, 1964

The Kenyan ambassador in Washington, D. C. is the official representative of the Government in Nairobi to the Government of the United States.

== List of representatives ==
Diplomatic agrément	Diplomatic accreditation	Ambassador	Observations	President of Kenya	List of presidents of the United States	Term end
April 8, 1964			Embassy opened	Jomo Kenyatta	Lyndon B. Johnson	
March 17, 1964	April 8, 1964	Burudi Nabwera		Jomo Kenyatta	Lyndon B. Johnson	
April 29, 1969	May 6, 1969	Leonard Oliver Kibinge		Jomo Kenyatta	Richard Nixon	
December 19, 1974		Bernard Adundo	Chargé d'affaires	Jomo Kenyatta	Gerald Ford	
April 20, 1976		Ernest Muriuki Mungai	Chargé d'affaires	Jomo Kenyatta	Gerald Ford	
March 14, 1977	March 23, 1977	John Peter Mbogua		Jomo Kenyatta	Jimmy Carter	
June 23, 1983		Gideon W. Uku	Chargé d'affaires	Daniel Arap Moi	Ronald Reagan	
January 26, 1984	March 13, 1984	Wafula Wabuge		Daniel Arap Moi	Ronald Reagan	
June 5, 1986	June 23, 1986	Sospeter Onuko Mageto		Daniel Arap Moi	Ronald Reagan	
February 29, 1988	March 22, 1988	Denis Daudi Afande		Daniel Arap Moi	Ronald Reagan	
June 23, 1994		Benjamin Edgar Kipkorir	Died on May 20, 2015	Daniel Arap Moi	Bill Clinton	
December 10, 1997	March 16, 1998	Samson Kipkoech Chemai	Chief Executive of KPTC has been appointed Chairman of Kenya Airports Authority	Daniel Arap Moi	Bill Clinton	
July 11, 2000	September 5, 2000	Yusuf Abdulrahman Nzibo		Daniel Arap Moi	Bill Clinton/George W. Bush	
May 24, 2004	July 15, 2004	Leonard Njogu Ngaithe		Mwai Kibaki	George W. Bush	
September 5, 2006	August 10, 2010	Peter Nicholas Rateng’Oginga Ogego		Mwai Kibaki	George W. Bush	
July 27, 2010	September 12, 2006	Elkanah Odembo Absalom		Mwai Kibaki	Barack Obama	
November 13, 2014	May 18, 2019	Robinson Njeru Githae		Uhuru Kenyatta	Barack Obama	
May 3, 2019		Lazarus Ombai Amayo		Uhuru Kenyatta William Ruto (Since 13 September 2022)	Donald Trump Joe Biden (Since January 20, 2021)	

== See also ==
- Kenya–United States relations
