= Mang'u High School =

Coordinates: 1°04′19″S 37°02′46″E

- The Desert Warriors

Location
- 314; Thika, Kiambu County; Kenya

Information
- Type: Catholic National High School
- Motto: Jishinde Ushinde (Conquer yourself to conquer)
- Established: 1925
- Founder: Michael Joseph Witte
- President: Crispo Osoro
- Chairman: Anthony M. Mithanga
- Principal: Bernard Kingah
- Chaplain: Daniel Kariuki
- Grades: 9-12
- Website: www.manguhigh.com

Mang'u High School is a Kenyan Roman Catholic National High School established in 1925, located in Kiambu County along the Nairobi-Thika Highway six kilometres (3.7 mi) from Thika, Kenya. Mang'u High School is ranked among the top schools nationwide in Kenya Certificate of Secondary Education and has many eminent alumni including one Kenyan president, several vice presidents, a Central Bank of Kenya governor and a former Cardinal.

== History ==
Mang'u High School was founded in 1925 in Kabaa, a small township located East of Thika Town, by the Holy Ghost Fathers missionaries of the Catholic Church.

The missionaries had wanted to expand the Kilungu Catholic mission and, instead of doing that at Kilungu, located in present-day Machakos county, opted for a new site. The missionaries chose the site at Kabaa as it had already been a previous Catholic mission site.

Father Michael Joseph Witte, a Dutch Catholic priest who headed the Kilungu mission, was chosen to head the new institution at Kabaa which opened on 19th January 1925 with 35 students as the Central Training School for Catechists. The students were drawn from other Catholic missions at Bura, Msongari (present-day St Austin's Nairobi), Lioki, Kiambu, Mang'u and Nairobi (St Peter's Clavers) In 1930, the institution's name changed to St Michael Catholic Mission.

Earlier in 1929, Father Witte had put in motion plans to have a section of the institution become a secondary school with the first four students being Cyrus Ojoo, Paul Njoroge, Stefan Kimani and Lukas Kibe. The students sat for their Junior Secondary School Education examination in 1930 and passed.

In April 1934, Father Witte left for holiday in his native Netherlands and when he came back to Kenya in 1935, he was transferred from Kabaa to the Catholic mission at Waa at the Coast.

In 1939, the secondary was moved to Mang'u village. It wasn't until 1940, after this move and after the Senior Secondary School Education examinations had been replaced with the Cambridge School Certificate Examination the previous year, that Mang'u finally had its first batch of students sitting for the senior exam. They were Stephen Kioni and Philip Getao. Later, in 1972, the school moved to its current location along the Nairobi-Thika Highway.

The Holy Ghost Fathers ran the school until 1960 when the Marianist Brothers from the United States took over. In 1969, Kenya's Ministry of Education took over the running of the school and appointed a Kenyan African, Raphael Njoroge, to lead the school as the headmaster.

The Marianist Brothers started the school's aviation training programme in 1961. It would remain Kenya's only high school aviation programme until Maseno School introduced a similar programme in 2002 after Mang'u's former principal, Paul Otula, was transferred there.

== Campus ==
The school admits bright students from financially challenged backgrounds which led to a shortfall of funds for development. However, the school has obtained additional funding from the government which has enabled the school to run smoothly.

In June 2011, the school was hit by a storm that damaged the kitchen and dining hall, knocking out power supply for some time.

Kenya Airways procured 40 computers and set up two computer laboratories: one for all students and another specifically for the Aviation Technology program.

On 16 May 2011, the French ambassador to Kenya, Etienne de Poncins and the Ministry of Education, launched a French Language Resource Centre at Mang’u High School.

The School is also leading in the effort to go green by using Biogas energy. Effluent from the institution is collected in three different digester tanks and then piped over three km (1.9 mi) to the gas chamber where the gas is collected. It is then used to power a generator used in the school.

The school facilities include:

- two volleyball courts
- two rugby pitches
- three basketball courts
- one football pitch
- one hockey pitch
- one swimming pool
- one table tennis
- three handball fields
- Twenty dormitories (Ronald Ngala, Schneider, Kimathi, Kenyatta, Tom Mboya, Fr Edwards, Old Boys, Cardinal Otunga, Arch. Ndingi, Bro. Raymond, Michuki1 and Michuki2, Njue1, Njue2 Muhoho1 and Muhoho 2, Uhuru 1, Uhuru 2, Uhuru 3 and Uhuru 4 and finally New Dorm 1 and New Dorm 2)
- nine science laboratories
- one chapel (installed in 2002)
- three computer labs
- one multi-purpose Amphitheatre
- farming areas and dairy facilities
- Power Mechanics and Electricity workshops
- Aviation workshop
- 2 Dining Halls
- a music room

== Academics ==
In 1951, Mang'u High School became the first African school in East Africa to have a full science course in physics, chemistry and biology.

Mang'u High School is ranked among the top schools nationwide in Kenya Certificate of Secondary Education. In 1989 and 2007, Mang'u High School ranked first nationwide in the Kenya Certificate of Secondary Education and led the country in the national exam.

The school also hosts the Moi National Mathematics Contest, an exam prepared by Mang'u High School teachers that brings together students from every high school in Kenya. The contest started in 1996 with 19 schools and increased to 74 schools in 1999. The number of participating students also increased from 278 to 1,200 in the same period. The National Math Contest has gained fame as a competitive and challenging mathematics exam that prepares students for the Kenya Certificate of Secondary Education. The school also hosts a Science Congress and Aviation Symposium annually.

=== Admission ===
The school is highly selective, with only the top performing students in the Kenya Certificate of Primary Education offered admission. Once offered admission, students must submit a letter of introduction from either the chief of their area, the pastor or father in charge of their parish/mission and a letter from their primary school headmaster. This is to ensure only disciplined students are admitted to maintain the standards of the school.

There has been controversy in the past where powerful politicians secure a place for their children though they did not perform well. In 2001, the students went on strike to protest the forced transfer of Principal Paul Agali Otula after he refused to admit the son of a government official. The school admits students from both public and private schools in a quota system to ensure that top students from every county are admitted. The school applies an affirmative action policy to ensure marginalized students from hardship semi-arid areas are given a chance.

=== Departments ===
The Heads of Departments (H.O.D) are appointed by the Teachers Service Commission. The ten departments are as follows:

- Science Department
- Humanities Department
- Geography Department
- Department of Technical Subjects
- Mathematics Department
- Business Education Department
- Languages Department
- Clubs Department
- Boarding
- Guidance and Counselling Department

== Aviation ==
Mang'u High School is the first school in Kenya to introduce Aviation Technology as an examination subject. In 1961, Michael Stimac started the Amateur Radio Club, Electronics Club and Air Program.

The Aviation Technology program is focused on technical skills such as propulsion, thermodynamics, meteorology. The Aviation students undertake most of their studies at Wilson Airport and Moi Air Force Base in Embakasi. The original Schweizer Aircraft glider N3909A used by the Marianist Brothers for Aviation training crashed. It is moved to the workshop as a memorial and is used for educational purposes only. The school acquired a Beechcraft Queen Air 5Y-MHS twin engined light aircraft. The Kenya Air Force assists with repairs of the aircraft and training. The school received a lot of materials, tools and teaching aids from various airlines such as Kenya Airways, Airkenya Express, CMC Aviation, Aviation Luxeken and British Airways. Kenya School of Flying used to give scholarships during the last two years of High School to the students. Some students have proceeded to join the Kenya Air Force while others have studied aeronautical engineering at American, British and Russian universities.

== Athletics ==
Possessing an athletic program over 50 years old, Mangu offers its students the opportunity to play in several sports and possesses teams that compete in basketball, soccer, handball, rugby, tennis, volleyball, and field hockey.

== Clubs and societies ==
Mang'u high provides a wide array of clubs to develop individual student interest and abilities. The clubs invite and visit other schools for various functions pertaining to their societies. The school administration has given the clubs full support in their endeavours. For every club, there is a patron who acts as a consultant. The school has many clubs including Law, Debate, Drama, Music, the Scouts Movement, Presidential Awards, Science, Engineering, Robotics, Hack, Aviation, Journalism, Chess, French, German and Computer clubs.

Recently the Mang'u Robotics Club has been partnering with the Robotics team in Horace Mann School in New York, United States on establishing a FIRST Robotics Team in Mang'u.

The Societies in the school include Young Catholic Society, Christian Union, Seventh Day Adventist, Muslim Brothers Society and the Humanist Society.

== School emblem ==
The school emblem features a dove with wide spread wings to symbolize the Holy Spirit descending on Pentecost. The emblem traces the history of the Roman Catholic order of priests known as the Holy Ghost Fathers or Spiritans. The shield demonstrates the readiness to defend one's principles. The emblem also contains the school's motto Jishinde Ushinde.

== School motto ==
Jishinde Ushinde is a Kiswahili phrase meaning conquer yourself so that you may conquer the world around you. The motto reminds the students that the greatest competition that should be waged is against one's own self (laziness, greed and selfishness) and not against other persons.

== School name ==
The name Mang'u is a Maasai word that was adopted into the Kikuyu language when the Agikuyu people settled in Mang'u village between Thika and Gatundu in Kenya where the school was located before 1972. The actual Kikuyu pronunciation extends the 'a' sound to be closer to maang'u.

According to Brother Ken Thompson who taught English for 15 years at Mang'u High School, mang'u is a Maasai word meaning that's not me you smell. Bro. Ken is reported to have said that when the Maasai hunted lions in the tall grass, they would shout "mang'u, mang'u" to inform their fellow hunters of the situation.

The difference in the spellings Mangu and Mang'u arises from the use of the apostrophe ng' in the written forms of Kenyan languages to differentiate between ng as in bang, hang and sing from ng as used in mango, anger and hunger.

In most formal documents and newspapers, the headlines and headings use the full name as Mangu High School without the apostrophe. Within the text of most sports articles and websites, the single name Mang'u appears with an apostrophe. Some confusion occurs whenever the word Mangu is presented without either the apostrophe or the phrase High School.

== Gallery ==
Logo

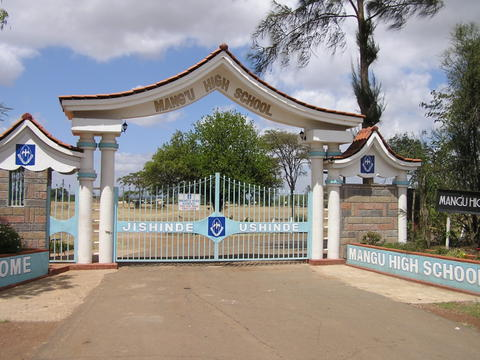
Mang'u High School

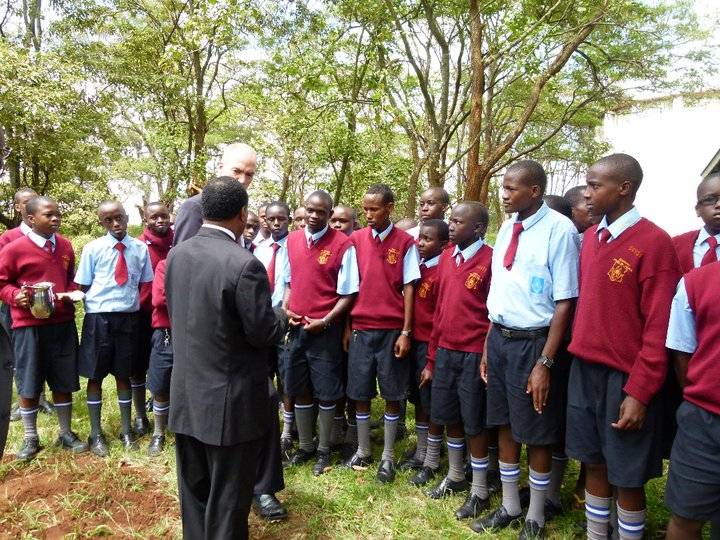
New Students

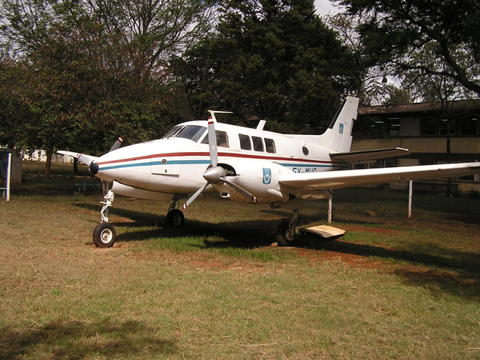
Beechcraft Queen Air 5Y-MHS

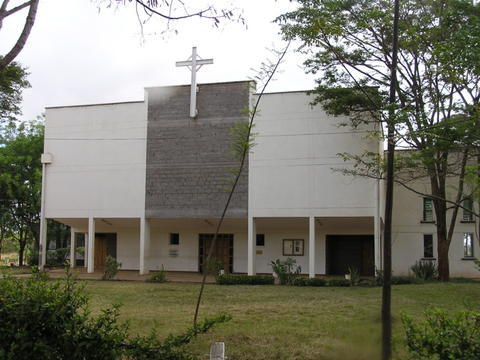
Chapel

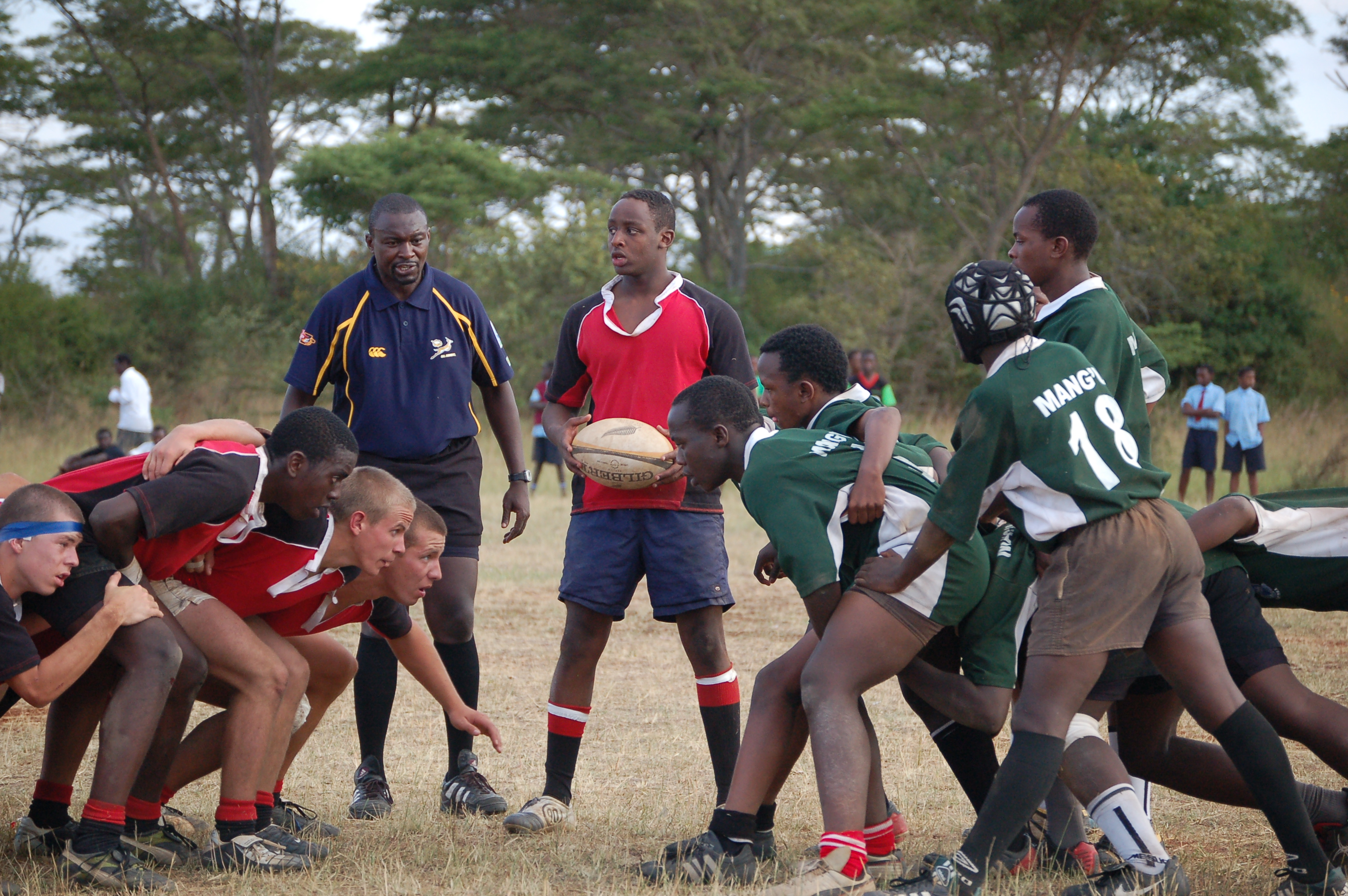
Rift Valley Academy take on Mang'u High School's Wazimba in a Prescott Cup game

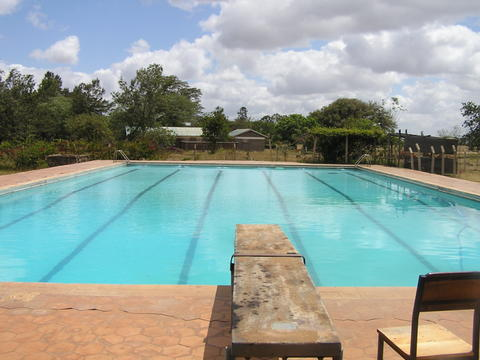
Swimming Pool

== Notable alumni ==
- Khadambi Asalache (1935 – 2006), Kenyan poet and author who settled in London in 1960, later a civil servant at HM Treasury, taught Swahili at the Berlitz School, and worked for the BBC African Service.
- Hon. Moody Awori (born 1927), 9th vice president of Kenya
- Hon. Cyrus Jirongo, politician and a former Member of Parliament in Kenya
- Hon. Ronald Karauri, former captain at Kenya Airways, CEO of SportPesa, and a member of Parliament in Kenya
- His Excellency Mwai Kibaki (1931-2022), 3rd President of Kenya
- Wilfred Kiboro (born 1944), CEO Nation Media Group
- Hon. Evans Kidero (born 1957), pharmacist, politician and first governor of Nairobi County.
- Hon.Tom Mboya (1930 – 1969), founder of the Nairobi People's Congress Party and the Minister of Economic Planning and Development
- Hon.John Michuki (1932 – 2012), four-term Member of Parliament for Kangema Constituency and Cabinet Minister.
- Hilary Ng'weno (born 1938), the first Editor in Chief of Daily Nation
- John Joseph Njenga (born 1928), Roman Catholic archbishop of Mombasa Diocese
- Dr. Patrick Njoroge (born 1961), 9th Governor of the Central Bank of Kenya
- Maurice Michael Otunga (1923 – 2003), Cardinal and Archbishop emeritus of Nairobi and Military Ordinary emeritus for Kenya.
- Hon. Prof. George Saitoti (1945 – 2012), 6th Vice President of Kenya
- Binyavanga Wainaina (1971 – 2019), author, journalist and winner of the Caine Prize, nominated by the World Economic Forum as a "Young Global Leader" but declined the award.
