= Muriithi =

Muriithi/Mureithi is a Kenyan, Kikuyu name meaning "shepherd". Notable people who have this name include:

- Muriithi Kagai, Kenyan businessman and politician
- Ben Mutua Jonathan Muriithi (born 1969), Kenyan radio and television journalist and actor
- Ndiritu Muriithi, Kenyan politician
