= Lionel Bruce Greaves =

British Educational Missionary

Lionel Bruce Greaves (1895–1984) was a Welsh missionary to Africa, soldier, educator, and author. His published reports were essential during United Kingdom discussions considering independence movements in Sub-Saharan Africa. He was awarded the Military Cross (UK), The Order of the White Eagle (Serbia), and the OBE (UK).

Greaves brought political, educational, and religious change to Ghana, Kenya, Uganda, and Tanzania as well as the independence movements of Basutoland and Swaziland. He served in the British army throughout World War I and also served various communities in Africa, providing educational leadership and religious evangelism.

== Early life and education ==
Born in Cardiff, Wales in 1895, Greaves won a scholarship in 1914 to Trinity College, Cambridge, Cambridge, and planned to attend. Shortly after however, he attested for, or joined, the 21st Battalion, Royal Fusiliers.

== Military service ==
In the military, Greaves held the positions Lance-Corporal and Second Lieutenant in various Battalions (21st, 17th, 8th). He was awarded the Military Cross (MC) in 1919 and Order of the White Eagle (Serbia) 5th Class "with Swords". Receiving the Military Cross, Greaves was described as demonstrating in a military action on 25 September 1918, "gallantry and devotion" in leading an attack on Pt 1472, near Doiran Lake, North Macedonia and overpowering the opposing forces who were using rifles and machine guns. Due to Greaves' leadership and courage, the men quickly defeated the opposing forces with their Lewis gun. Graves received the Order of the White Eagle, 5th Class with Swords from the King of Serbia in 1920 for his service on the Macedonia front in World War I as part of the British Salonika Army.

== Career ==
Greaves had grown up in a Christian atmosphere and in 1922, went abroad to become the Vice-Principal at Wesley College of Education, Kumasi, Kumasi, Ghana. Greaves worked to convert many Africans to Christianity. During his time there, he wrote many letters to other missionaries and friends at home and multiple books.

In 1932, he moved to become the supervisor of Methodist schools, and in 1937, he became the educational advisor to non-Roman missions in East Africa, specifically Kenya and Uganda. His responsibility, along with Rev J C C Dougal's, was to train local teachers and develop progress reports. Prior to his next occupancy, Greaves was involved in a plane crash into a bush where he wasn't rescued for several days.

From 1947 to 1950, Greaves served as the general manager of Methodist Schools. While working in Tanganyika, modern-day Tanzania, Greaves met with the Standing Education Committee of the Tanganyika Missionary Council, whose mission was "To facilitate and coordinate the united witness of member churches and church-related organizations by building their capacity in evangelism, networking, advocacy, and socio-economic development for the benefit of the community." In June 1950, he was appointed to the Officer of the Order of the British Empire, marking his significant contribution to British Society. After finishing his missionary work, Greaves continued to research and write in London.

== Publications ==
- Greaves, Lionel. The High Commission territories: Basutoland, the Bechuanaland Protectorate, and Swaziland. London, Edinburg House Press, 1954.
- Graeves, LB. Report on a visit to south and central Africa, September 1953 to February 1954. London, Conference of Missionary Societies in Great Britain and Ireland, 1954.
- Greaves, Lionel. Everyman's concern: the Rhodesias and Nyasaland. London, British Council of Churches, 1959.
- Greaves, Lionel Bruce. Carey Francis of Kenya. London, Rex Collings Limited, 1969.

== Legacy and impact ==
In Africa, Greaves educated thousands of children. His work in East Africa led to the Institute of Christian Education at home and overseas asking him to speak about educating foreigners about Christianity.

In 1969, Greaves published a book about Edward Carey Francis, a British mathematician and missionary to Kenya throughout the mid-twentieth century. Greaves wrote how his close friend played a pivotal role in developing the Alliance High School (Kenya).

After moving away from the United Kingdom, he died on September 15, 1984, in Whanganui District, Manawatū-Whanganui, New Zealand.
