= Lugari Constituency =

Electoral constituency of Kenya

Lugari
- constituency for the Parliament of Kenya
- Lugari Constituency within Kakamega County

- Kakamega County within Kenya
- County: Kakamega
- Population: 122,728
- Area: 254 km^{2} (98.1 sq mi)

Current constituency
- Number of members: 1
- Party: ODM
- Member of Parliament: Nabii Daraja Nabwera
- Wards: 6

Lugari Constituency is an electoral constituency in Kenya. It is one of twelve constituencies in Kakamega County, and the only constituency in the former Lugari District. The entire constituency has eight wards, all of which elect representatives for the Kakamega County Assembly. The constituency was established for the 1988 elections.

== Members of Parliament ==
Elections	MP	Party	Notes
1988	Burudi Nabwera	KANU	One-party system.
1992	Apilli Waomba Wawire	KANU	
1997	Cyrus Jirongo	KANU	
2002	Enoch Wamalwa Kibunguchy	NARC	
2007	Cyrus Jirongo	KADDU	
2013	Ayub Angatia Savula	UDF	
2017	Ayub Angatia Savula	KADDU	
2022	Nabwera DARAJA Nabii	ODM	

== Locations and wards ==
Locations
Location	Population*
Chekalini	20,322
Kongoni	44,58
Likuyani	26,169
Lugari	29,377
Lumakanda	30,994
Mautuma	26,077
Nzoia	18,631
Sinoko	21,207
Total	x
1999 census.

Wards
Ward	Registered Voters
Chekalini	6,421
Kongoni	13,265
Likuyani	8,391
Lugari	8,784
Lumakanda	10,000
Mautuma	7,611
Nzoia	9,066
Sinoko	7,606
Total	71,144
*September 2005.
