= Cyrus Jirongo =

Kenyan politician (1961–2025)

Honourable Cyrus Shakhalaga Khwa Jirongo

Minister for Rural Development
- In office 12 March 2002 – 27 December 2002
- President: Daniel arap Moi

Member of Parliament for Lugari Constituency
- In office 27 December 2007 – 4 March 2013
- Preceded by: Enoch Kibunguchy
- Succeeded by: Ayub Savula

Member of Parliament for Lugari Constituency
- In office 29 December 1997 – 27 December 2002
- Preceded by: Apili Waomba
- Succeeded by: Enoch Kibunguchy

Personal details
- Born: 21 March 1961 Vihiga, Western Kenya, Colony and Protectorate of Kenya
- Died: 13 December 2025 (aged 64) Naivasha, Kenya
- Party: United Democratic Party (Kenya)
- Spouses: Christine Nyokabi Kimani; Anne Kanini; Anne Lanoi Pertet; Joan Chemutai Kimeto(divorced)
- Children: 38
- Education: Mang'u High School
- Alma mater: University of Cambridge; Egerton University
- Occupation: Politician; Businessman

Cyrus Shakhalaga Khwa Jirongo (21 March 1961 – 13 December 2025) was a Kenyan politician and past government Minister for Rural Development from 12 March 2002 to 27 December 2002 in the Daniel Moi administration. He had previously served as Member of Parliament for Lugari Constituency between 1997 and 2002 and subsequently between 2007 and 2013.

Between 1978 and 1981, he went to Mang'u High School. He became the chairman of AFC Leopards football club in 1991.

Jirongo was leader of the United Democratic Party.

== Career ==
=== Business career ===
==== Offshore Trading Company ====
Jirongo has been associated with several corporate entities involved in large-scale property and financing transactions, most notably Offshore Trading Company Ltd, a private company linked to his business interests. In the early 1990s, Offshore Trading Company obtained a KSh 1.1 billion loan from Postbank Credit Ltd, a financial institution that later collapsed. The loan was secured against a 1000-acre large parcel of land in Ruai, Nairobi.

Following the collapse of Postbank Credit Ltd, the Kenya Deposit Insurance Corporation (KDIC), acting as liquidator under the oversight of the Central Bank of Kenya (CBK), initiated recovery proceedings against several debtors, including entities associated with Jirongo. Due to accrued interest over several decades, the outstanding claims connected to the Offshore Trading Company loan grew substantially, leading to protracted legal disputes.

The Ruai land charged as collateral became the subject of extended litigation, with KDIC seeking to auction the property to recover the debt. Jirongo and related entities challenged the enforcement process in court, obtaining injunctions at various stages and disputing the procedures used in the debt recovery efforts. The matter attracted public attention due to the size of the land, the historical nature of the loan, and the length of time the dispute remained unresolved.

Offshore Trading Company and Jirongo have also been named in other land-related court cases, including disputes arising from failed or contested land sale agreements with private parties. These cases have contributed to Jirongo's public profile as a businessman whose commercial activities have intersected with Kenya's financial sector reforms, land administration challenges, and the recovery of non-performing loans from collapsed financial institutions.

==== Sololo Outlets ====
Sololo Outlets Ltd was a Kenyan private company associated with Jirongo. The company became prominent in the early 1990s following its involvement in a large-scale housing development project in Nairobi, which later resulted in prolonged legal and financial disputes with state institutions.

In 1992, Sololo Outlets Ltd entered into a contractual agreement with the National Social Security Fund (Kenya) to develop a housing project known as Hazina Estate in South B, Nairobi. Under the agreement, NSSF advanced substantial funds toward the construction of the estate. However, disputes arose after Sololo Outlets sought a revision of the project cost, leading NSSF to terminate the contract. By the time of termination, NSSF had reportedly paid approximately KSh 1.39 billion toward the project.

The termination of the contract led to extensive litigation between Sololo Outlets Ltd and NSSF, with the company contesting the termination and seeking compensation through the courts. The dispute persisted for many years and became one of Kenya's most notable commercial and public-sector legal battles of the period. Courts ultimately allowed NSSF to proceed with issuing title deeds to homeowners, while claims by Sololo Outlets Ltd continued to be litigated in various forms.

Sololo Outlets Ltd was also cited in discussions surrounding the collapse of several financial institutions in the 1990s, including Postbank Credit Ltd, from which companies associated with Jirongo had obtained large loans that were later classified as non-performing. These financial difficulties, together with the prolonged court disputes, contributed to the decline of Jirongo's business empire in subsequent years.

The activities of Sololo Outlets Ltd and its disputes with state agencies formed a significant part of the public and legal scrutiny surrounding Jirongo's business career, alongside his political engagements in later years.

==== Other Land holdings ====
Cyrus Jirongo was associated with Kuza Farms & Allied Limited, a company that owned agricultural land in Uasin Gishu County, near Chepkoilel. The property comprised a farm of approximately 103 acres, which was at various times used for agricultural activities and associated commercial operations.

The land was later used as security for bank lending obtained by companies linked to Jirongo. Following loan defaults connected to the collapse of Dubai Bank Kenya, the property became subject to statutory sale proceedings by the bank's liquidator. The land was subsequently auctioned and sold as part of efforts to recover outstanding debts owed by the borrower companies.

===== Mukuru kwa Reuben properties (Nairobi County) =====
Companies associated with Jirongo were also linked to land parcels in Mukuru kwa Reuben, an informal settlement area located in Nairobi County. The ownership and status of these parcels became contentious due to the presence of long-standing residents, public utilities, and community infrastructure established on portions of the land.

The Mukuru kwa Reuben properties were later drawn into legal and administrative processes involving debt recovery, competing ownership claims, and questions concerning public interest use. Over time, some of the land became associated with public facilities, including schools and health centres, complicating private ownership claims and enforcement actions.

===== Upper Hill Property Dispute =====
Jirongo was involved in a long-running legal dispute concerning ownership and dealings over a parcel of land located in Upper Hill, Nairobi. The dispute arose from a transaction dating back to the early 1990s, when Jirongo entered into an agreement to purchase the property through a private company arrangement.

In 1992, the land was charged to Post Bank Credit Limited as security for a loan. Decades later, the original vendors challenged the legality of the charge, alleging that the transaction was fraudulent and that Jirongo lacked authority to use the property as collateral. The matter gave rise to both civil proceedings and criminal complaints relating to alleged fraud and forgery.

Jirongo challenged the criminal prosecution in court, arguing that the claims had been brought after an inordinate delay and that key documents relating to the transaction were no longer available. In 2021, the Supreme Court of Kenya ruled in his favour on procedural grounds, holding that the prosecution violated his right to a fair trial due to the passage of time and circumstances surrounding the evidence. The ruling did not determine the substantive issue of ownership of the property.

The dispute highlighted broader challenges associated with land transactions in Kenya, particularly those involving historic agreements, the use of property as loan security, and delayed litigation. As of the last reported court proceedings, the ownership and civil claims relating to the Upper Hill property remained subject to ongoing legal processes.

=== Political career ===
==== YK 92 ====
In 1992, he led the Youth for Kanu '92 (YK '92) movement supporting the then ruling KANU party ahead of the first multiparty elections in Kenya.

==== 1997–2001: Parliamentary career ====
Jirongo became an MP at the 1997 elections, when he won the Lugari Constituency seat. Two years later, he fell out with KANU and was associated with the unregistered United Democratic Movement party. At the 2002 General elections, he represented KANU but was defeated by Enoch Kibunguchy of NARC.

==== Minister For Rural Development ====
Ahead of the 2002 elections, he was appointed the Rural Development Minister by President Daniel arap Moi.

==== 2007–2012: Parliamentary return ====
Jirongo formed a new political party known as Kenya African Democratic Development Union (KADDU) and successfully reclaimed the Lugari Constituency seat at the 2007 elections. The elections were followed by a political crisis in Kenya which was resolved by a broad coalition government. KADDU was the only parliamentary party excluded from the government and Jirongo was the sole MP for the party. In his bid to become Kenya's fourth president, he had been identified with the URP and more recently New FORD-Kenya, before formally joining the Federal Party of Kenya.

==== 2013 Presidential run ====
Jirongo declared an interest in running for the Kenya Presidential seat in the 2013 Kenyan Presidential election. He eventually opted to run for the Kakamega County Senate seat and support the right Hon. Raila Odinga's bid for the presidency. He lost the bid to Dr. Bonny Khalwale.

==== 2017 general elections ====
In the 2017 Kenyan general elections Jirongo vied for the presidency under the United Democratic Party. He garnered 11,282 votes (approximately 0.07% of all cast) in August and only 3,832 in the October repeat election after the annulment of the first vote.

==== 2022 general elections ====
The United Democratic Party contested the 2022 Kenyan general election as part of Azimio La Umoja, and elected two MPs. Jirongo contested for the Kakamega County gubernatorial seat coming a distant third with 5,974 Votes

Jirongo congratulated William Ruto on his victory.

== Personal life and death ==
=== Personal life ===
Jirongo was polygamous and married more than 10 wives over the course of his life. Notably, four of them are widely recognized, with the marriage to the fourth having ended in divorce. His four wives were: Christine Nyokabi Kimani, a Kikuyu; Anne Kanini, a Kamba; Anne Lanoi Pertet, a Maasai; and Joan Chemutai Kimeto, a Kalenjin, from whom he later divorced. He had thirty eight children.

=== Death ===
Jirongo died in a traffic collision in Naivasha, Kenya, on 13 December 2025, at the age of 64. On 16 December 2025, the Directorate of Criminal Investigations announced the launch of its investigation into his death. This is after concerns were raised by the family, associates and the public over factors surrounding his death, such as how he ended up in Naivasha despite reportedly departing Karen for his Gigiri home in the middle of the night. He was buried on 30 December at his Lumakanda home.

Despite the Directorate of Criminal Investigations (DCI) ruling out foul play in Jirongo's death, several political figures renewed calls for a thorough and transparent inquiry during his funeral. These calls were prompted by what they described as inconsistent accounts regarding the number of occupants in Jirongo's vehicle at the time of the collision as well as non-existent 65 passengers in the bus involved in the collision as per the DCI narrative of his death, raising lingering questions about the circumstances surrounding his death.
