= Eunice Muringo Kiereini =

Kenyan nurse

Eunice Muringo Kiereini (born 1939) is a retired nurse who was Kenya's Chief Nursing Officer from 1968 to 1986, with responsibility for overseeing and developing nursing in Kenya after independence. She has served in many different health organisations, at home and abroad, and was the first African president of the International Council of Nurses (ICN).

== Early years ==
Eunice Muringo Githae was born on 24 September 1939 in Kerugoya to parents who were both teachers. After secondary education at Loreto High School in Limuru she went to the UK to train at Southampton General Hospital from 1959–1962. Once she had qualified as a nurse she went to the Simpson Memorial Maternity Pavilion in Edinburgh for midwifery training, completing it in 1964. She worked at George VI hospital, now Kenyatta National Hospital, before doing additional training at the Victoria University School of Nursing in Wellington, New Zealand. Back in Kenya, she became President Jomo Kenyatta's private nurse. From 1967 she played a key role in establishing the National Nurses Association of Kenya, an organisation given legal status in 1968. She is the second wife of Jeremiah Kiereini, senior civil servant and businessman, in 1971.

== Career ==
Kiereini was Chief Nursing Officer at the Ministry of Health from 1968 to 1986, following Matron-in-Chief Margaret Wanjiru Koinange who had filled a similar role for the first few years of independence, and she was responsible for many developments in nursing and nursing education. These included the first advanced nursing course in East Africa which was offered at Nairobi University, a shift from colonial-era hospital-based healthcare towards more community nursing, and a Nurses Act giving professional nurses more independence. In the mid-1970s she was on the African Health Training Institutions Project's consultative group for nursing, midwifery and allied health professions, sponsored by USAID, and was a founder member of the Kenya Water for Health Organisation.

She was the first African president of the International Council of Nurses (ICN) from 1981 to 1985 after being a Board Member of the Commonwealth Nurses and Midwives Federation from 1977 to 1979. Tel Aviv University awarded Kiereini an Honorary Fellowship in 1986. In the early 1990s she was a member of the Global Advisory Council on AIDS, and was involved in various ways with the World Health Organization (WHO), partly as chairman of the Regional Nursing Task Force based in Nairobi. She has also been a consultant to the Rockefeller Foundation. Positions since 2010 include chairman of the council of the Flying Doctors Society of Africa, chairman of Impact East Africa, and a trustee of the Rattansi Educational Trust.

== Relatives ==
She has several influential siblings, notably her sister, writer Micere Githae Mugo, and brother Robinson Njeru Githae, a government minister. Their father was the teacher Solomon Githendui Githae (1904-2007).
