= Lugari District =

Coordinates: 0°05′N 34°00′E

Lugari District was one of the seventy-one districts of Kenya, located in that country's Western Province. Its capital was Lugari. In 2010, the district was eliminated and incorporated into Kakamega County.

Lugari District had a population of 215,920 and an area of 670 km^{2} .

Lugari District had one local authority, Lugari county council. The only constituency in the district was Lugari Constituency. The district was divided into three administrative divisions:

Administrative divisions
Division	Population*	Urban pop.*	Headquarters
Lugari	80,132	4,527	Lumakanda
Likuyani	91,210	3,958	Likuyani
Matete	44,578	0	Matete
Total	215,920	8,485	-
* 1999 census. Sources: ,
