= Maseno School =

Secondary school in Kisumu County, Kenya

Coordinates: 0°00′06″S 34°36′23″E

- Maseno; Kenya

Information
- Type: Public National School
- Motto: Perseverance shall win through
- Religious affiliation: Anglican
- Established: 1906
- Founder: JJ Willis
- Chairman: Ambrose Otieno Weda
- Principal: Peter Owino
- Sports: Basketball, Rugby, Football, Hockey
- Alumni: Maseno Old Boys Association (MOBA)
- Website: Maseno School

Maseno School, located in Kisumu County in Kenya, is one of the oldest formal education schools in the country.

The school's location, some 25 kilometres from Kisumu city, is the subject of a years-long conflict between the neighbouring Luo and Banyore communities of Kisumu Rural constituency in Kisumu county and Emuhaya constituency in Vihiga county with each claiming not just the school but the nearby university and trading centre.

The Equator passes right through the school, acting as a divider between some classes and dormitories. A popular saying among students and alumni is that of "sleeping in the Southern hemisphere and going to school in the Northern hemisphere".

== History of the school ==
Maseno National School, along with the Maseno Mission Hospital, was established in 1906 by the Missionaries of the Church Missionary Society (CMS) as a school for the children of African chiefs. CMS' successor, the Anglican Church of Kenya (ACK) remains the current sponsor of the school, overseen by the Diocese of Maseno South.

The first administrator of the school was Reverend James Jamieson Willis fondly remembered as J.J Willis. Willis House, a dormitory in the school, is named in his honour.

In 1905, Willis was sent to explore the Kavirondo or lake region of Kenya as a prospective place for the establishment of a mission. After touring the area Willis pitched tent under a Hickory tree (Carya ovalis) known in the local languages as oseno (Luo) and omseno (Luhya). That particular place was proposed to be the site of the new mission with land being donated by Chief Ogola Ayieke and later in August 1908, a chapel, the Rock of Ages, also known as St. Paul's Chapel was built next to the tree.

The place became known as Maseno and it is where, in 1906, the missionaries established Maseno School. The first students were six sons of African chiefs. They were Simon Ndinya, Onduso, Odindo, Owiti, and the late senior chief Yonah Orao.

The establishment of the school in the area attracted youthful boys from all over Western Kenya. Besides reading and writing, students were taught various skills such as carpentry, tailoring, printing, building, telegraphy and clerical work.

As such, during the school's first few years, there was a student protest. It was organized and led by Daniel Ojijo Oteko, a student who believed that the African students were receiving the bare minimum education. He received the support of his fellow students in what would go down in the history of the school as the first ever protest. Until 2017 when students stormed out of class to protest the interdiction of then principal Paul Otula, it had remained the only case of student unrest at the school. Oteko's wishes would be granted when a formal curriculum – like the one in the European schools in other parts of the country – was introduced in 1910. Ojijo Road in Nairobi is named for Ojijo Oteko.

Teacher training was introduced in 1920 to train teachers who would in turn teach new students. This is what happened, for instance, to BA Ohanga, later the first African to be appointed a minister in the colonial government, who was prevailed upon by Edward Carey Francis to go back to the school and teach. Those who studied at the school were tested at the end of their courses and awarded certificates.

The colonial hangovers depicting the school's early history are still visible to-date. The hut that Jaramogi Oginga Odinga built during his time as a teacher at the school in protest of a silent policy that had white teachers getting the best houses with views of the Lake Victoria and black African teachers being assigned the north-facing staff houses overlooking the Mabungo hills, still stands.

Perhaps Maseno School's greatest contribution to the local area's growth has been the growth of the institution that occupies some of its land: Maseno University. The university is a result of the merger of Siriba Teachers College and the Government Training Institute. The former, had been established to train teachers who, in the colonial days, ended up at Maseno School.

The school celebrated its centennial in 2006 with the climax of the centenary celebrations being a visit to the school by then President Mwai Kibaki on 5 December 2006.

== Maseno School today ==
Most of the old structures built in the early 20th century still stand to-date even though a number of new modern ones have since been put up to keep up with the times and handle the burgeoning student population.

The school's dormitories are currently named after notable personalities in the country as well as alumni and former head teachers. A famous alumni, the late Festo Habakkuk Olang', the first African archbishop of the Anglican Church of Kenya, is remembered with the presence of Olang' House in the school. Kenya's slain Foreign Affairs minister Dr Robert Ouko also has a dormitory named after him, Ouko House.

Previously, the school's dormitories had been named after the CMS missionaries who had pioneered the school, including the white principals. For example, the missionary work of Archdeacon Walter Edwin Owen is immortalised in the school with the presence of Owen House. Ugandan Anglican evangelist Apolo Kivebulaya had a dormitory named after him that would later be known as Mayor House. As did Bishop Heywood and Bishop Alfred Robert Tucker.

The school routinely has a good showing in the Kenya Certificate of Secondary Education (KCSE) nationwide and is consistently ranked highly in its various categories: as a public school and as a national school.

The school's sponsor, the Anglican Church of Kenya, is represented on the school's board of management by the Bishop of Maseno South Diocese. Day-to-day, the bishop is represented in the school by the school chaplain.

The school hosts one of the most prestigious mathematics contests in the country every year.

School alumni can join the Maseno Old Boys Association (MOBA) and has been involved in various charitable causes as well as infrastructure development.

The current Principal is Peter Owino, formerly of Baringo National School. Owino took over from Andrew Buop who was posted to the United States to serve in the country's diplomatic mission as an education attache.

== List of Maseno School Principals ==
1. Reverend James Jamieson Willis, popularly known as JJ Willis (1906 - 1911)
2. Reverend Albert Edward Pleydell (1913 - 1917)
3. Reverend Canon John Britton (1917 - 1926)
4. Reverend Harold Stone C Hitchen (February - December 1926)
5. Canon Dr John Stansfeld (1926 - 1928)
6. Edward Carey Francis (1928 - 1940)
7. Arthur William Mayor (1940 - 1950)
8. Bertram Lindsay Bowers, popularly known as BL Bowers (1951 - 1969)
9. UA Wessler (1969 - 1973)
10. William Melchizedek Okech (1973 - 1975)
11. JT Ogweno (1976 - 1980)
12. EJ Were (1980 - 1981)
13. RK Siele (1982 - 1985)
14. Walter John Okumu Amadi (1986 - 2001)
15. Paul Agali Otula (2001 - 2017)
16. Andrew Odhiambo Buop (2017 - 2022)
17. Peter Owino (2022–present)

== Notable Administrators ==
Over the years, Maseno School has been led by influential head teachers who are remembered today in the school by way of various buildings named after them.

Canon John Stansfield, was a doctor and clergyman. Stansfield implemented various reforms which included variation of diet and helped construct a swimming pool at the mission. The swimming pool which has since disappeared, was the only one of its kind in East Africa. It was situated near a grove by two streams flowing down Bunyore hills.

Edward Carey Francis, came to Kenya as a missionary and teacher from Cambridge UK and the colonial office helped secure him a job as headmaster at Maseno School in December 1927. His illustrious administration of Maseno School attracted other teachers from Cambridge and the school became an academic oasis in East Africa. Francis headed Maseno School from 1928 to 1940, when he left to become the principal at Alliance High School in Kikuyu. Carey Francis famously caned his then student and Kenya's future first Vice-President, Oginga Odinga, for stealing paraffin, as outlined in the latter's autobiography. He is fondly remembered by many elderly Kenyans today for his no-nonsense approach to teaching and administering. While at Maseno, his students nicknamed him Achuma, meaning 'man of steel'. The Edward Carey Francis Memorial Library in the school is named after him.

BL Bowers, who served for 18 years as principal remains the longest-serving head teacher in the history of the school. It is during his time that the school's dining hall, which remains in use to-date, was built and commissioned. Bowers House, for a long time the only storied building in the school, stands in his honour today.

Walter Amadi was a long-serving principal throughout the 90s and the annual Amadi Open Tournament (also variably named the Maseno Open tournament) held at the beginning of the year in the school is named in his honour. Amadi House, a dormitory in the school, is also named after him.

Paul Agali Otula, who served as the principal from the year 2001 is widely credited with restoring the school's lost glory in the decade and a half he was at the helm of the school, establishing the school as a formidable force to reckon with in all disciplines: academics and extra-curricular activities. In his time, the school won national, regional and continental championships in hockey, rugby and basketball with its students joining various national teams. He is credited with introducing Aviation Technology in the school, borrowing from his previous work station, Mang'u High School, where had served as the principal prior to his Maseno posting. Paul Otula Complex, a dormitory popularly known as "POC" by the students and the latest at the school, is named after him.

== Notable alumni ==
- Moody Awori, politician (served as Kenya's 9th Vice-President) - from Maseno where he did his junior secondary school, Awori headed to Mang'u High School, the school many associate him with today
- Benjamin Ayimba, sportsman (decorated coach of the national rugby 7s team, Shujaa)
- Robinson Njeru Githae, politician (ex-MP and cabinet minister) and diplomat
- Otieno Kajwang , Member of Parliament for Mbita Constituency (1998–2013), Minister of State for Immigration and Registration of Persons (2008–2013), and Senator for Homa Bay County (2013–2014).
- David Musila, politician (ex-MP, former Deputy Speaker) and administrator
- John Nyagarama, politician (served as the first Governor of Nyamira county)
- Barack Obama Sr., senior governmental economist and the father and namesake of Barack Obama
- Billy Odhiambo, sportsman
- Thomas R. Odhiambo (4 February 1931 – 26 May 2003), a Kenyan entomologist and environmental activist who directed research and scientific development in Africa
- Jaramogi Oginga Odinga, Kenya's first Vice President
- Prof Bethwell Allan Ogot, leading historian and university administrator
- Benaiah Apollo Ohanga, the first black African to be appointed minister in the colonial era government
- Festo Olang, clergy (the first African head of the Anglican Church of Kenya and Bishop of Nairobi)
- Reuben J. Olembo: academic, geneticist, environmentalist. Former Deputy Executive Director of UNEP
- William Odongo Omamo, politician (ex-MP, cabinet minister)
- Joab Omino, politician (ex-MP, former Deputy Speaker)
- Achieng Oneko (1920-2007) National hero, freedom fighter, one of Kapenguria Six. MP Nakuru, minister of Information in Kenyatta's first cabinet
- Eliud Owalo, politician (ICT minister)
- David Wasawo, zoologist and educator

== Extra-curricular activities ==
The school offers a variety of co-curricular activities including debating and public speaking, sports (rugby, hockey, basketball, football, badminton, swimming, table tennis, lawn tennis, handball, volleyball, etc), science fairs, etc.

== See also ==
- Category:Alumni of Maseno School
