= Paul Otula =

Kenyan education and sports administrator

Paul Agali Otula was a Kenyan educationist, basketball coach, school and sports administrator. He served as the head teacher at several elite schools in Kenya in a career spanning over three decades. From 2008 till his death in 2025, he served as the Chairman and President of the Kenya Basketball Federation and sat on the Executive Board of the National Olympic Committee of Kenya.

== Early life ==
Paul Otula was born on 3rd January 1964 in the then Rachuonyo District of the current Homa Bay County.

== Education ==
Otula joined Kenyatta University in 1984, graduating in 1988 with a Bachelor of Education (Arts) degree in 1988. In 2014, he earned a Master of Business Administration (MBA) in Organizational Leadership from the University of Liverpool.

== Career ==
=== Mang'u High School ===
Otula served as a classroom teacher and basketball coach at Mang'u High School before rising to become a Deputy Principal and, later, the Principal.

In 2001, he was transferred to Jamhuri High School in Nairobi county before a decision was made to send him to Maseno School as the Principal. His transfer led to protests by students over several days.

=== Maseno School ===
Otula succeeded long-serving principal Walter Okumu Amadi at Maseno School in late 2001.

His tour of duty at the school was marked by successes in multiple disciplines in and out of class. The school's rugby 7s team represented Kenya in the secondary schools category at the Dubai 7s while he led the school's basketball team, which he coached, into victory at the Engen Africa Youth Basketball championships in Durban, South Africa, in 2003.

He is credited with introducing Aviation Technology as a teachable and examinable subject at Maseno School.

His highest point in academics at the school was in 2016 when the school was ranked as the best public school in the previous year's national examinations and the second-best school in Kenya in those examinations overall. A year later, in 2017, he would be interdicted following alleged cases of sodomy at the school. The move led to student unrest at the school and the resignation of the board of management.

=== Sunshine Secondary School ===
Otula joined Sunshine Secondary School in Nairobi County as the principal in 2018, serving until 2021 when he quit in anticipation of his run for the Karachuonyo parliamentary seat in his native Nyanza region in the 2022 General Elections.

=== Basketball ===
Otula contested and won the chairmanship of the Kenya Basketball Federation in 2008, beginning a long stint at the helm of the country's basketball governing body. He won his fourth term (the second term under the new Kenya Basketball Federation constitution) at the national basketball body in 2021.

In 2017, Otula was elected to the National Olympic Committee of Kenya to represent basketball interests. He was re-elected in 2021 and joined the Committee's Executive Board.

== Death ==
Paul Otula died on 1st May 2025 at his Nairobi home after a reported cardiac arrest.

== Awards and honours ==
In December 2005, Otula was awarded a Head of State Commendation (HSC) by former President Mwai Kibaki. Kibaki's successor, former President Uhuru Kenyatta, awarded Otula the Order of the Grand Warrior of Kenya, 10 years later.

In 2008, at the annual Kenya Secondary School Heads Association gathering in the coastal city of Mombasa, Otula was voted by fellow teachers as the Principal of the Year.

== Publications ==
'Mastery of Modern School Administration'.
