= Kenya African Democratic Development Union =

Political party in Kenya

The Kenya African Democratic Development Union (KADDU) is a political party in Kenya.

== History ==
KADDU was established in 2006 by former MP Cyrus Jirongo and Mr. Humphrey Aluda. In the 2007 general elections it nominated 97 candidates, but received only 2% of the vote, winning a single seat in the 9th parliament, Jirongo in Lugari. With all other parties becoming part of the coalition government, KADDU effectively became the official opposition.

In 2011 Jirongo defected to the United Democratic Movement. KADDU did not contest the 2013 general elections.
