= Burudi Nabwera =

Kenyan politician (1927–2026)

Burudi Nabwera (2 February 1927 – 9 October 2026) was a Kenyan politician and diplomat. In the 1960s, he served as ambassador to the United States and permanent representative at the United Nations before retiring from the diplomatic service to enter politics. In 1988, he was elected as a member of parliament representing the Lugari Constituency in Western Province of Kenya. He lost that seat to Apili Wawire in the 1992 elections and retired from politics. In 2007, Nabwera was named chairman of the Nzoia Sugar company in Bungoma, Kenya for a three-year term.

Nabwera died on 9 October 2026, at the age of 99.
