= Micere Githae Mugo =

Kenyan writer, activist and professor (1942–2023)

Mĩcere Gĩthae Mũgo
- Born: Madeleine Mĩcere Gĩthae; 12 December 1942; Baricho, Kirinyaga District, Kenya
- Died: 30 June 2023 (aged 80); Syracuse, New York, United States
- Citizenship: Kenya and the United States
- Education: Alliance Girls High School; Limuru Girls High School; Makerere University; University of New Brunswick
- Occupations: Professor, playwright, author, activist and poet
- Employer: Syracuse University
- Spouse: Divorced
- Children: Mũmbi wa Mũgo, Njeri Kũi Mũgo
- Relatives: Eunice Muringo Kiereini; the late Judi Muthoni Gilmore; the late Joyce Muthoni Githae; Duncan Mutugi Githae; Winnie Wambui Marekia; the late Rose Wanjiru Wachira; the late David Githanda; Patrick Njeru Githae and Nancy Wangari Githae (siblings)

Mĩcere Gĩthae Mũgo (born Madeleine Mĩcere Gĩthae; 12 December 1942 – 30 June 2023) was a Kenyan professor, playwright, author, activist and poet. She was a literary critic and professor of Literature, Creative Writing and Research Methods in the Department of African American Studies at Syracuse University. She was forced into exile in 1982 from Kenya during the Daniel Arap Moi dictatorship for activism and moved to teach in the United States, and later Zimbabwe. She taught Orature, Literature, and Creative Writing.

Mũgo's publications include six books, a play co-authored with Ngũgĩ wa Thiong'o and three monographs. She also edited journals and the Zimbabwean school curriculum. The East African Standard listed her among the 100 most influential people in Kenya in 2002.

== Early life ==
Mũgo was born on 12 December 1942, in Baricho, Kirinyaga District, Kenya. The daughter of two progressive (liberal) teachers – Senior Chief Richard Karuga Gĩthae and Mwalimu Grace Njeri Gĩthae – who were politically active in Kenya's fight for independence.

Mũgo attended Alliance Girls' High School from 1957 to 1960.

Mũgo went on to attend Makerere University (where she gained her B.A. degree in 1966). She enrolled at the University of Nairobi in September 1966, later leaving for Canada to attend in 1969 the University of New Brunswick, where she earned her M.A. and PhD in 1973. She returned to Kenya to take up a teaching position at the University of Nairobi in 1973, and in 1978 became Dean of the Faculty of Arts and Social Sciences, making her the first female faculty dean in Kenya. She taught at the University of Nairobi until 1982, St. Lawrence University (1982–1984) the University of Zimbabwe (1984–1991) and was a visiting professor at Cornell University (1992).

=== Exile ===
Mũgo was a political activist who fought against human rights abuses in Kenya. Her political activism led to her being harassed by the police and arrested. Mũgo and her family (including two young daughters) were forced to depart Kenya in 1982 after the attempted coup of the Daniel Arap Moi government, following which she became a target of official government harassment. She was stripped of her Kenyan citizenship, but after one year, the Zimbabwean government invited her to apply for Zimbabwean citizenship, which she held until the mid-1990s, when she regained her Kenyan citizenship.

After leaving Kenya, she worked, wrote, and taught from abroad, and later said:

I'm a child of the universe, I have lived in almost all continents.

The poem "Speaking of Hurricanes" by Ama Ata Aidoo, included in Aidoo's 1992 collection An Angry Letter in January, was written "for Micere Mugo and all other African exiles".

== Late career ==
In 1993, Mũgo joined Syracuse University, where she taught Orature, Creative Writing, Caribbean Women Writers and Research Methods in the Department of African American Studies (AAS). In 2007, she was awarded the Laura J. and L. Douglas Meredith Professor for Teaching Excellence. In 2013, while at Syracuse University, she participated in the Commission on the Status of Women (CSW) conference at the United Nations, the theme of which was "The Elimination and Prevention of Violence Against Women and Girls", and in her address she said:

Writing can be a lifeline, especially when your existence has been denied, especially when you have been left on the margins, especially when your life and process of growth have been subjected to attempts at strangulation.

After 22 years of service, Mũgo retired in 2015, and was awarded Emeritus status. Marking her retirement from the AAS faculty at Syracuse, a symposium was held in her honour.

That same year, she delivered the keynote International African Writers Lecture, entitled "African Orature Artists and Writers birthing humanizing Sankofa-visions of Utu, Ubuntu and Justice for All", at the University of South Africa (UNISA) as part of the 4th Africa Century International African Writers Conference.

In 2021, the Royal African Society in London presented Mũgo with the "Africa Writes" Lifetime Achievement award in African Literature, the first recipient having been Margaret Busby in 2019.

Mũgo was the founder of the United Women of Africa Organization (UWAO) and a co-founder and President (at the time of her death) of the Pan African Community of Central New York (PACCNY). She was an official speaker for Amnesty International, a consultant for the "Africa on the Horizon" series by Blackside, a council member at Riara University, a past chairperson of the board of directors at the Southern Africa Regional Institute for Policy Studies (SARIPS) in Harare and had also served as a consultant for many foundations, and on the board of many journals and organizations.

== Death ==
Mũgo, who had been outspoken about having had multiple myeloma cancer for sixteen years, died on 30 June 2023, at the age of 80, in Syracuse, New York, where she was buried on 31 July in Oakwood Cemetery.

== Works ==
Mũgo was a distinguished poet, and the author or editor of 15 books. Her work is generally from a traditional African, Pan-African and feminist perspective, and draws heavily upon indigenous African cultural traditions.

Mũgo and fellow Kenyan activist writer Ngugi wa Thiong'o co-wrote the play The Trial of Dedan Kimathi, published in 1977 and performed at FESTAC 77 in Lagos, Nigeria. Trial had its U.S. premiere in 2014 at the experimental theatre space in UC Irvine's Claire Trevor School of the Arts, directed by Dr. Jaye Austin Williams and choreographed by Dr. S. Ama Wray.

Mũgo also collaborated with the Zimbabwean writer Shimmer Chinodya in editing plays and stories for adolescents in Shona.

In a 2021 interview, Mũgo spoke of working on a second volume of her essays and speeches, following 2012's Writing and Speaking from the Heart of My Mind, as well as a third collection of poetry.

Mũgo's 2021 book, The Imperative of Utu / Ubuntu in Africana Scholarship, was written in commemoration of the 50th anniversary of the Africana Studies and Research Center, Cornell University. She described herself as "an adamant and passionate advocate of utu and ubuntu", and explained: "Utu, is a Kiswahili term that loosely translates into 'the essence of being human,' or 'the state of being a human being.' You cannot claim to possess 'the essence of being human' unless you share it with and affirm it in other/all people."

=== Plays ===
- The Long Illness of Ex-Chief Kiti, East African Literature Bureau, 1976
- The Trial of Dedan Kimathi (co-authored with Ngũgĩ wa Thiong'o), Heinemann, 1977

=== Poetry ===
- Daughter of My People, Sing!, East African Literature Bureau, 1976, ISBN 9789966441546
- My Mother's Song and Other Poems, East African Educational Publishers, 1994, ISBN 9789966464996

=== Literary criticism ===
- Visions of Africa: The Fiction of Chinua Achebe, Margaret Laurence, Elspeth Huxley, and Ngũgĩ wa Thiong'o, Kenya Literature Bureau, 1978
- African Orature and Human Rights, Institute of Southern African Studies, National University of Lesotho, 1991, ISBN 9789991131009
- The Imperative of Utu / Ubuntu in Africana scholarship, Daraja Press, 2021, ISBN 978-1990263248

=== Autobiography ===
- Writing and Speaking from the Heart of My Mind, Africa World Press, 2012, ISBN 978-1592218547

== Selected awards and honours ==
- 1985: Marcus Garvey Award from the Canadian Branch of UNIA.
- 1987–90: Award for research on African orature and human rights, Ford Foundation.
- 1992: Award for writing and publication, Rockefeller Foundation.
- 1994: The Syracuse University African American Student Association, Malcolm X Memorial Award For Excellence in Academic and Community Service.
- 2002: "The Top 100: They Influenced Kenya Most during the 20th Century", East African Standard.
- 2002: Sojourner Truth Award for Black Woman Professor of the Year, National Association of Negro Business & Professional Women's Clubs.
- 2003: Founder, United Women of Africa Organization.
- 2004: Human Rights Award, Onondaga County Human Rights Commission.
- 2004: Beyond Community Recognition Awards, Inc.
- Lifetime Community Service Award (CNY Women Syracuse Chapter).
- 2007: Laura J. and L. Douglas Meredith Professor for Teaching Excellence, Syracuse University.
- 2007: Distinguished Africanist Scholar Award, New York African Studies Association (NYASA).
- 2008: Girl Scouts Women of Distinction Award, Lafayette Country Club.
- 2008: Central New York (CNY) Women of Distinction Award, for contributions to the Syracuse community.
- 2009: United Women of Africa Organization (UWAO) Award for Visionary Leadership Award.
- 2010: Lifetime Achievement Award, Pan African Studies Program, Syracuse University.
- 2012: Mwalimu Julius Nyerere Distinguished Lecturer Award, University of Dar es Salaam.
- 2013: Flora Nwapa Award for excellence in Africana literature, African Literature Association.
- 2013: Elder of the Burning Spear, Government of Kenya.
- 2020: Doctor of Letters Honorary Degree, University of Nairobi.
- 2021: Lifetime Achievement Award in African Literature, Royal African Society.
- 2022: Lifetime Achievement Award, the Defenders Coalition and the Embassy of Sweden in Kenya.
- 2023: Proclamation from the Mayor's Office, City of Syracuse.
- 2024: Fonlon-Nichols Award from the African Literature Association.

== Legacy ==
She is the subject of a collection of essays in her honour, Making Life Sing in Pursuit of Utu: The Micere Githae Mugo Story (Bookcraft, 2022), edited by D. Ndirangu Wachanga, her biographer and a professor of media studies and information science at the University of Wisconsin, who also made a documentary film of the same title.
