= Lugari =

Shopping center in Kenya

Coordinates: 0°39′N 34°51′E

Location of Lugari in Kenya

Lugari is a shopping center in Kakamega County in the former Western Province of Kenya. Until 2010, it was the capital of the former Lugari District. The shopping center is located 10 kilometres east of Webuye. Lugari has an average population of 5000 Lugari has two constituencies: Likuyani and Lugari.
