= Robinson Njeru Githae =

Kenyan politician (born 1957)

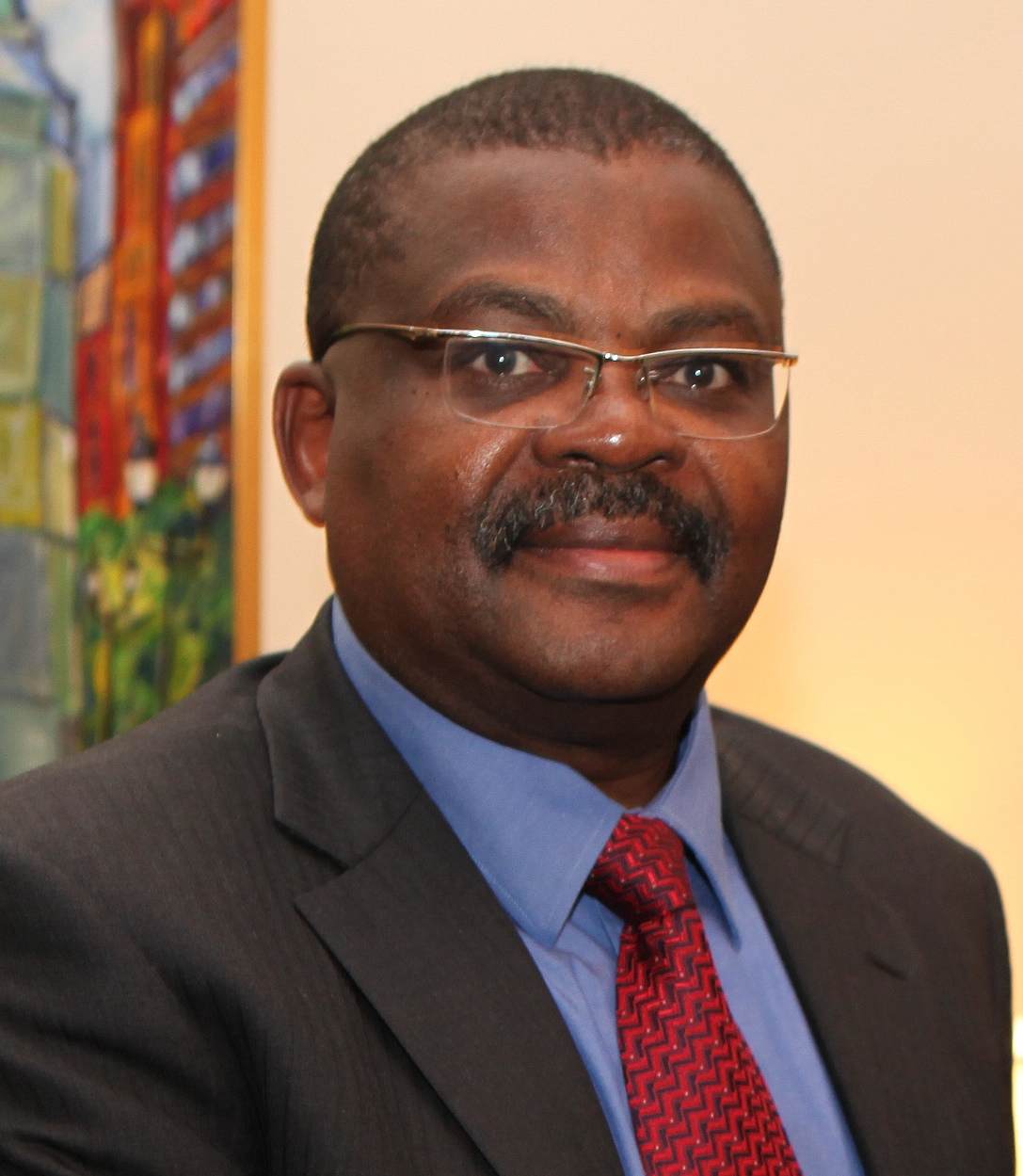

Kenyan Ambassador to the United States
- In office 18 November 2014 – 3 May 2019
- Appointed by: Uhuru Kenyatta

Minister for Finance
- In office 2011–2013
- President: Mwai Kibaki
- Preceded by: Uhuru Kenyatta
- Succeeded by: Henry Rotich

Member of Parliament for Ndia Constituency
- In office 2003–2013

Personal details
- Born: 1957 (age 68–69) Kenya
- Party: Party of National Unity
- Spouse: Alice
- Relations: Micere Githae Mugo Mrs. Eunice Muringo Kiereini(sister) Purity Gathoni Macharia(sister)
- Children: 3
- Education: University of Nairobi (LL.B); Kenya School of Law Maseno School

Robinson Njeru Githae (born 1957) is a Kenyan politician. He belongs to the Party of National Unity and was elected to represent the Ndia Constituency in the National Assembly of Kenya from the Kenyan parliamentary election, 2002. He has served as assistant minister in the ministries of justice, transport and local government before being appointed a minister in the ministries of Nairobi Metropolitan then Kenya's finance minister. He was appointed by President Uhuru Kenyatta as Kenya- US ambassador on 14/08/2014. He was later transferred to Vienna in May 2019 as Kenya’s ambassador to Austria where he is currently serving.

He has three well-known sisters: former Chief Nursing Officer Eunice Muringo Kiereini, the writer Micere Githae Mugo and Purity Gathoni Macharia, co-founder and co-owner of Royal Media Services. Their father was Solomon Githendui Githae (1904-2007). In May 2019 he was appointed Kenyan ambassador to Vienna, Austria.
