= National High School =

School in Kolkata, India

National High School is a two-campus school in South Kolkata, in the state of West Bengal, India. While one campus (the Sarat Bose Road campus) is affiliated to the West Bengal Board of Secondary Education and the West Bengal Council of Higher Secondary Education, the other (Hazra Road campus) is affiliated with the Central Board of Secondary Education.

== History ==
The N R Iyer Memorial Education Society, registered under Societies Registration Act, 1860 was formed by South Indian residents in Kolkata in January 1935 with the object of taking over the Anglo-Tamil School founded in 1913 by the Tamil speaking people and promoting the cause of education primarily for the South Indian children in Kolkata.

The Anglo-Tamil School was elevated to a high school in January 1938 and was named National High School. The primary and secondary sections were housed in the Society's building at 164, Sarat Bose Road, Kolkata. At the beginning, the secondary section ran as a co-educational school, but in 1960 it was divided into two sections, one for boys and other for girls.

The boys section moved to the Society's new building at 42/1, Hazra Road, Kolkata in 1964. The kindergarten section was started in 1974, at 164, Sarat Bose Road, Kolkata. The boys school has a primary section attached to it since 1979. Higher Secondary Curriculum (Plus two course) was added to both the high schools when the course was introduced by the Government. A Montessori section was added in 1988 in the boys school. Both schools are managed by the N R Iyer Memorial Education Society.

The University of Calcutta granted recognition to the school in 1939. In 1940, the first batch of students appeared for the Matriculation Examination. The primary section attached to the girls school has been granted recognition by the Government of West Bengal Board of Secondary Education, and higher secondary by the West Bengal Council of Higher Secondary Education.

Prior to 1964, the medium of instruction in the Primary Section was Tamil, while it was English in the secondary section from inception. At present the medium of instruction in both the schools from kindergarten to higher secondary is English with Tamil or Hindi as first language. In order to promote the three language formula adopted by the Government of India, Tamil is being taught as a third language for all the students at the primary level.

== Curriculum ==
The curriculum is based on the guidelines set by the West Bengal Board of Secondary Education and the West Bengal Council of Higher Secondary Education and the Central Board of Secondary Education. The medium of instruction in the school is English. The students in the secondary section choose either Bengali, Hindi or Tamil as a vernacular course. The higher secondary section offers students a choice between Tamil, Hindi and Bengali and the vernacular course.

== Governance ==
Principals:

- NHS Sarat Bose Road Campus - Mrs. Rama Subramanian
- NHS Hazra Road Campus - Mrs. Mini Nair

Society Leadership

- President - S Radhakrishnan Tamizhan
- Vice President - S N Bhaskaran
- Secretary - R Jagannathan
- Assistant Secretary - Vijayamala Hariharan
- Treasurer - R Nagarajan

== See also ==
- List of schools in West Bengal
