= Ndia Constituency =

Kirinyaga District, Central Province, Kenya

Ndia Constituency is an electoral constituency in Kenya. It is one of four constituencies in Kirinyaga County, Central Province. The constituency was established for the 1988 elections.

== Members of Parliament ==
Elections	MP	Party	Notes
1988	James Njagi Njiru	KANU	One-party system.
1992	Kinyua Mbui N.	Democratic Party	
1997	James K. Kibicho	Democratic Party	
2002	Robinson Njeru Githae	NARC	
2007	Robinson Njeru Githae	PNU	
2013	Eng. Stephen Muriuki Ngare	TNA	
2017	Hon. Gk, George Macharia Kariuki	Jubilee Party	
2022	George Macharia Kariuki	UDA	

== Locations and wards ==
Locations	Population
Kiine North	26,959
Kiine South	29,890
Mukure	20,547
Mwerua	18,149
Total	85,545

Ward	Registered Voters	Local authority
Gacharu	3,454	Sagana town
Karima	3,139	Sagana town
Kathaka	1,714	Sagana town
Kariti	8,139	Kirinyaga county
Kiine	12,957	Kirinyaga county
Mukure	10,636	Kirinyaga county
Mwerua	19,598	Kirinyaga county
Total	47,637	
*September 2005,
