= Great Lakes University of Kisumu =

University in Kenya

- Gluk
- Type: Private University
- Established: 1998
- Vice-Chancellor: Prof Hazel Miseda Mumbo
- Undergraduates: Offered
- Postgraduates: Offered
- Doctoral students: Offered
- Location: Great Lakes University of Kisumu P.O.BOX 2224 - 40100, Kisumu, KENYA, Kisumu, Kenya
- Campus: Main Campus (Kibos) Millimani Campus (Kisumu Town) Nairobi Campus. (Centro House - Westlands)
- Colors: Green, blue and yellow
- Nickname: GLUK
- Website: www.gluk.ac.ke

Great Lakes University of Kisumu (or GLUK) is a Kenyan private chartered university. The idea of establishing the Great Lakes University of Kisumu originated in the Tropical Institute of Community Health and Development (TICH) in Africa, which spearheaded the application for authority to operate as a university. The establishment of TICH in 1998 was inspired by a number of sources expressing the need for a formal course in Community Based Health Care leading to a recognized academic qualification.

== Academics ==
GLUK runs on a tri-semester academic calendar with admissions in January, May and September. Holiday classes are conducted during April, August, and December – on a ministry-based learning program.

=== School of Nursing and Midwifery ===
==== Department of Nursing ====
- Bachelor of Science in Nursing (Full-time) - 12 trimesters
- Bachelor of Science in Nursing (Upgrading) - 9 trimesters

==== Department of Midwifery ====
- Masters of Science in Nursing (Part-time) - 6 trimesters

=== School of Clinical Medicine and Allied Sciences ===
==== Department of Clinical Medicine ====
- Diploma in Clinical Medicine, Surgery and Community Health - 12 trimesters
- Bachelor of Clinical Medicine and Community Health - 12 trimesters
- Bachelor of Clinical Medicine and Community Health (Upgrading) - 9 trimesters

=== School of Public Health ===
Masters:

- Masters in Community Health and Development: Full-time: 5 semesters
- Masters in Community Health and Development: Part-time (Saturday-Sunday): 8 semesters
- Masters in Community Health and Development: Distance Learning: 7 semesters

Higher Diploma:

- Higher Diploma in Community Health Development: Full-time: 2 Semesters
- Higher Diploma in Community Health and Development: Part-time (Saturday-Sunday): 4 Semesters
- Higher Diploma in Community Health and Development: Distance Learning: 3 Semesters

Bachelors:

- Bachelors in Community Health and Development: Full-time (Direct Entry): 8 Semesters
- Bachelors in Community Health and Development: Full-time (Upgraders): 5 Semesters
- Bachelors in Community Health and Development: Distance Learning (Upgraders): 6 Semesters
- Bachelors in Community Health and Development: Part-time (Upgraders) (Saturday-Sunday) : 6 Semesters
- Bachelor of Science in Community Nutrition: Full-time (Direct Entry): 8 Semesters
- Bachelor of Science in Community Nutrition: Part-time (Upgraders) (Saturday-Sunday) : 6 Semesters
- Bachelor of Science in Community Nutrition: Distance Learning (Upgraders): 5 Semesters

Diplomas:

- Diploma in Community Health and Development: Full Time (Direct Entry): 6 Semesters
- Diploma in Community Health and Development: Part-time (Post Basic) (Saturday-Sunday) : 3 Semesters
- Diploma in Community Health and Development: Evening classes - 1730-2030 hrs - (Post Basic): 3 semesters
- Diploma in Community Nutrition: Full-time (Direct Entry): 4 semesters

Certificates:

- Certificate in Community Nutrition: Full-time (Direct Entry): 4 Semester
- Certificate in Community Health and Development: 4 Semesters

Short courses:

- International Health
- Health care in complex, chronic emergency situations
- Health economics, financing and poverty reduction
- Health, ethics and human rights
- Reproductive and child health
- Health policy analysis and development.
- Communication and Technology
- Advanced Research Methods

=== Faculty of Arts and Science ===
The Faculty of Arts and Science departments are:

- Department of Agribusiness Management
- Department of Theology and CRE
- Department of Information Technology
- Department of Hospitality and Tourism
- Department of Business Administration
- Department of Education

==== Department of Agribusiness Management ====
The department focuses on improving agribusiness innovations based on existing technologies. Agriculture is the major source of livelihood to 80% of the Kenyan population. It contributes 25% of GDP and 70% of Kenyan's employment. Agribusiness encompasses the supply of agricultural inputs, the production and transformation of agricultural products, and the distribution of goods to consumers.

==== Department of Pastoral Theology ====
Great Lakes University of Kisumu (GLUK) is an interdenominational evangelical Christian institution. It is a product of the Tropical Institute of Community Health and Development. The Department of Theology draws students mainly from Christian evangelical churches in Africa and beyond.

===== Courses =====
- Certificate in Theology (2 Semesters-Minimum units 12): KCSE with a mean grade of C− or its equivalent
- Diploma in Theology (4 Semesters-Minimum units 24): KCSE with a mean grade of C or its equivalent
- Bachelor of Theology (8 Semesters-Minimum Units 48): KCSE with a mean grade of C+ or Diploma in Theology with distinction or credit from a recognized theological college.
- Bachelor of Theology - Christian Counseling Option
- Bachelor of Theology - Chaplaincy Studies Option
- Bachelor of Arts – Christian leadership option
- Masters in Theology (6 Semesters) (offered in collaboration with the Great Lakes University of Goma-DRC)

Areas of teaching include:

- Practical Ministry - Systematic Theology
- Church History - Biblical Studies (OT emphasis or NT emphasis)
- Masters of Arts in Christian Ministry - with the following options:
  - Practical Ministry - Leadership
  - Christian Counseling

==== Department of Community Nutrition ====
The department is concerned with planning foods and supplements for maintenance of individual and community health (infancy, childhood, adulthood and old age), and during different illnesses. It also deals with the assessment of nutritional status of individuals and communities.

Graduates of community nutrition program are employed in hospitals, hotels, universities, schools and other catering facilities. They are also self-employed as consultants.

==== Department of Information Technology ====
The department addresses the need for Africa to harness IT for increased productivity and effectiveness in all sectors of the economy.

=== Tropical Institute of Community Health and Development (TICH) ===
The institute focuses on the health and development of disadvantaged communities.

==== Programs ====
Masters:

- Masters in Community Health and Development : Full-time: 5 semesters
- Masters in Community Health and Development: Part-time (Saturday-Sunday) : 8 semesters
- Masters in Community Health and Development : Distance Learning: 7 semesters

Higher Diploma':

- Higher Diploma in Community Health Development : Full-time: 2 Semesters
- Higher Diploma in Community Health and Development: Part-time (Saturday-Sunday): 4 Semesters
- Higher Diploma in Community Health and Development : Distance Learning: 3 Semesters

Bachelors:

- Bachelors in Community Health and Development: Full-time (Direct Entry): 8 Semesters
- Bachelors in Community Health and Development: Full-time (Upgraders): 5 Semesters
- Bachelors in Community Health and Development: Distance Learning (Upgraders): 6 Semesters
- Bachelors in Community Health and Development: Part-time (Upgraders) (Saturday-Sunday) : 6 Semesters
- Bachelor of Science in Community Nutrition: Full-time (Direct Entry): 8 Semesters
- Bachelor of Science in Community Nutrition: Part-time (Upgraders) (Saturday-Sunday) : 6 Semesters
- Bachelor of Science in Community Nutrition: Distance Learning (Upgraders): 5 Semesters

Diplomas:

- Diploma in Community Health and Development: Full Time (Direct Entry): 6 Semesters
- Diploma in Community Health and Development: Part-time (Post Basic) (Saturday-Sunday) : 3 Semesters
- Diploma in Community Health and Development: Evening classes - 1730-2030Hrs- (Post Basic): 3 semesters
- Diploma in Community Nutrition: Full-time (Direct Entry): 4 semesters

Certificates:

- Certificate in Community Nutrition: Full-time (Direct Entry): 4 Semester
- Certificate in Community Health and Development: 4 Semesters

Short courses:

- International Health
- Health care in complex, chronic emergency situations
- Health economics, financing and poverty reduction
- Health, ethics and human rights
- Reproductive and child health
- Health policy analysis and development.
- Communication and Technology
- Advanced Research Methods

==== Research ====
The Tropical Institute of Community Health and Development (TICH) engages in research in- and outside the region. In improving the performance of district health systems in Kenya, the institute was involved in spearheading the development of the community strategy for Kenya which was tested in six pilot districts in Nyanza Province, Kenya before it was scaled up in the whole country as a policy.

Through its partnership program and using its Essential Elements of Dignified Livelihood (EEDL) model, the institute undertakes and implements, in collaboration with communities and institutions, community and institution-based health and development programs that contribute to poverty alleviation and combating ill health.

== Current research projects ==
University research projects include:

- 'Scaling up of community strategy for accelerated maternal and neonatal and child health in Siaya and Homabay counties' aims to scale up and accelerate maternal and neonatal and child health indicators in Homabay and Siaya counties in Kenya. It is hoped that this will reduce the burden of disease, and contribute to the achievement of MDGs. It is a UNICEF supported project.
- The 'Strengthening The Health System Through Collaborative Research' project aims to strengthen the uptake and functionality of the Community Health Strategy by building the capacity of the community to establish Community Units for health and development. It produces evidence on uptake of the Community Health Services elements; cost-effectiveness of CHS; and task shifting to level one. It is being implemented in Kisumu, Butere and Garissa. It is a Consortium National Health Research (CNHR).
- The 'Linking Community Based Health Information System And Institutional Health System For Effective Decision Making' project aims to strengthen the effectiveness of CBIS-HIS linkage and the effect to service uptake. It is being implemented in Kisumu, Butere and Garissa. It is an IDRC funded project
- 'Budget monitoring and advocacy for improved efficiency in health resource utilization' is a project that trains community health committee members on health budget monitoring and on improved efficiency in health resource utilization. It is running in five districts in Nyanza and Western Provinces. It is a WEMOS funded project.
- 'Liberating vulnerable communities from abject poverty through training for livelihood and cash transfer support' is a project that aims to liberate communities from abject poverty through training for livelihood and cash transfer support. It targets the Peri-urban area of Nyalenda. It is a concern-funded project.
- Revitalizing the halt in fertility decline is a project to support sensitization of the community on family planning. The project will produce a model for community based family planning system. It covers four districts across Western and Nyanza Provinces. It is an APHRC funded project.
- 'Scaling up Community Health Services' project aims to scale up Community Health Services in 25 districts across the country. It is a SIMAVI funded project.
- 'Promoting the uptake of PMTCT services among pregnant mothers' project promotes the uptake of PMTCT services among pregnant mothers in Greater Nyamira. It is a CDC funded project
- 'Building the capacity of CBOs in partnering communities through training' project aims to build the capacity of CBOs in partnering communities through trainings on governance, management and resource mobilization for health and development activities. The project objective is to build the capacity of Community Units to become sustainable. So far 15 Community Units drawn from seven districts in Nyanza and Western are beneficiaries. It is a SIMAVI funded project.
- 'Improving the nutrition status for the under fives in the Peri-urban slum' project aims to improve the nutrition status for the under fives in the Peri-urban slum of Nyalenda. It is a concern funded project.

== Collaboration and networking ==
The training and education at the institute has collaborative programs with universities.

External collaborations are with:

- Cheng’ Kung University of Taiwan
- Stellenbosch University of South Africa
- University of Amsterdam
- University of Ottawa
- l’Université Libre des Pays Grands Lacs (ULPGL) in Goma (DRC)
- The London School of Hygiene and Tropical Medicine
- Emory University
