= Muriithi Kagai =

Muriithi Kagai is the former director of microfinance lender Kosovo Enterprise Trust. He has also ran for governor of Kirinyaga County, Kenya, in 2013 and 2017.
