= Edward Carey Francis =

British mathematician and Kenyan missionary

Edward Carey Francis OBE, (13 September 1897 – 27 July 1966) was a British mathematician and Anglican missionary to Kenya, where he became "arguably the most influential educationist in Kenya's modern history".

He was born in Hampstead, London. He was educated first at William Ellis School, becoming head-boy of the school and captain of the cricket, football, tennis and athletics teams. After school he enlisted in the British Army, serving in the First World War with the Royal Field Artillery and being mentioned in despatches. On completion of the war he took up a scholarship to read mathematics at Trinity College, Cambridge.

After graduating, in 1922 he became a fellow of Peterhouse, Cambridge and Director of Studies in Mathematics. He left Cambridge in 1928 when he joined the Church Missionary Society. He was posted to Kenya and became firstly a teacher and later Headmaster of Maseno School in Nyanza between 1928 and 1940. He shortly served as Mathematics teacher at Duke of York School (Lenana School). He then served as Headmaster at Alliance High School between 1940 and 1962. During his time at Alliance he developed a mythical-like reputation as an inspiring teacher, educating many future politicians. In later years, between 1962 and 1966 he was Assistant Master at Pumwani High School. In Jomo Kenyatta's first cabinet, nine out of the fifteen members had studied under Francis at Alliance.

Francis died in Nairobi on 27 July 1966 and was buried within the grounds of Alliance High School. On his death, a silence was held in the House of Representatives, an honour usually reserved for Heads of State.
