= Embassy of Kenya, Washington, D.C. =

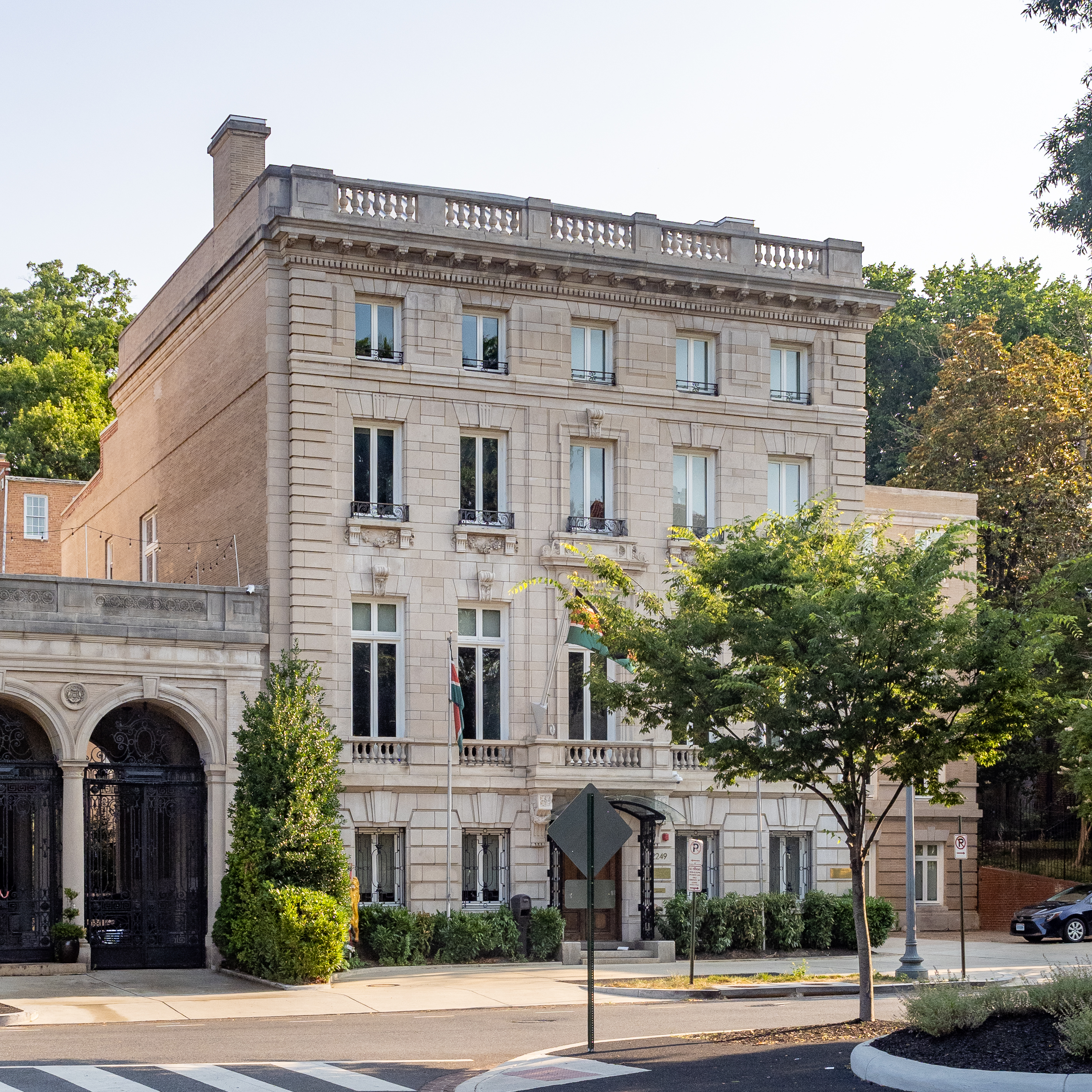
- Location: Washington, D.C.
- Address: 2249 R Street, N.W.
- Coordinates: 38°54′46.1″N 77°3′1″W
- Ambassador: Charge de Affaires' David K Gacheru

The Embassy of Kenya in Washington, D.C. is the Republic of Kenya's diplomatic mission to the United States, located in the Kalorama neighborhood at 2249 R Street Northwest, Washington, D.C. It is headed by David Kerich.

== Building ==
Previous owners of the Beaux-Arts building include C. Peyton Russell (original owner; 1908–1915), politician James D. Phelan (residence while serving in the United States Senate; 1915–1921) and the government of Sweden (embassy; 1921–1971). The 2009 property value of the Kenyan embassy is $6,554,280 ($6,133,120 – main building; $421,160 – side building). It is a contributing property to the Massachusetts Avenue Historic District and Sheridan-Kalorama Historic District.
