= Mumbi =

Legendary female ancestor of Gĩkũyũ people

Mũmbi is regarded as the mother of the Gĩkũyũ people. The word Mũmbi can be translated as the creator, "one who moulds/creates/builds". She and Gĩkũyũ were married, and both are claimed ancestor to all the Agĩkũyũ people. The story of Gĩkũyũ and Mũmbi has been recorded by various writers throughout the Gĩkũyũ orator and history; notable among them are Jomo Kenyatta, the first president of independent Kenya, Louis Leakey and the prolific Gĩkũyũ writer Gakaara wa Wanjaũ and another Gĩkũyũ writer known as Mathew Njoroge Kabetũ among many others. The name Mumbi comes from the Bantu root verb KUMBA, "BA", the same root word that gives rise to "UMBA". The prefix "Mu" is the Bantu noun classifier for nouns that have souls, like humans. The verb UMBA indicates the action of moulding, shaping, designing or creating. The suffix "i" replaces the terminal "a" in the Bantu language noun or verb to create the name for the performer of the action. Being derived from a Bantu root, the word Mumbi is also widely used by the Kamba ethnic community. Among the Kamba community, the name carries the same meaning as among the Kikuyus.

== Origin ==
The story of the origin of the Agĩkũyũ:

God (Ngai or Mũgai – The Divider/sharer/Giver) created Gĩkũyũ and Mumbi, the founders of the Gikuyu nation. The nation is named after Gĩkũyũ the patriarch [A-Gĩkũyũ] but by courtesy refers to itself as (Nyumba ya Mumbi). According to one of the myths God took Gikuyu on top of Kĩrĩ-Nyaga (Mount Kenya) and showed him all the land that he had given him: West from Mount Kenya to the Aberdares, on to Ngong Hills and Kilimambogo, then north to Garba Tula. He further promised Gikuyu that he would bequeath him all what Gikuyu laid his eyes on. He then pointed to him a spot full of Sycamore trees (Mũkũyũ) and he commanded him to descend and establish his homestead on the selected spot known as Mũkũrwe wa Gathanga (in present-day Muranga County). When Gĩkũyũ descended to the spot he found a beautiful woman Mũmbi, the founding Goddess of the nation. Together, Gĩkũyũ and Mũmbi had nine beautiful daughters: Wanjirũ, Wambũi, Wanjikũ, Wangũi aka Waithiegeni, Wangeci aka Waithĩra, Wanjeeri aka Waceera, Nyambura aka Wakĩũrũ, Wairimũ aka Gathiigia, and Wangarĩ. These nine deities/daughters founded the nine Kikuyu tribes. Gikuyu and Mumbi had a tenth daughter named Wamũyũ aka Warigia, who as a result of having a child out of wedlock, so the story goes, and went on to found or establish the Akamba nation. Not much is said about her and how she founded the Akamba nation. All the ten daughters' names are very popular names for Gikũyũ females to this day, linking them to their original mothers.

When the time came for the 9 eldest daughters to marry, the youngest Wamũyũ not yet being of age, Gĩkũyũ prayed to God under a holy fig tree (Mũkũyũ, some say Mũgumo), as was his tradition, to send him sons-in-law. He offered a lamb as sacrifice and as the fire was consuming the lamb’s body, nine men appeared and walked out of the flames. Gĩkũyũ took them home and each daughter married the man who was the same height as she was, and together they gave rise to the nine of the full-nine clans to which all Gĩkũyũs belong. Wamũyũ or Warigia got a child out of wedlock. These nine tribes are the Anjirũ, Agacikũ, Ambũi, Angũi aka Aithiegeni, Angechi aka Aithĩrandũ, Aacera, Ambura aka Aakĩũrũ aka Eethaga, Airimũ aka Agathiigia, Angarĩ aka Aithekahuno and Aicakamũyũ and all clans and families emanate from them perpetually, through patriarchy.

The Agĩkũyũ refer to each other as Andũ a Nyũmba ya Mũmbi or people of the house or home of Mũmbi. Shortly before a state of emergency was declared by the imperialists in colonial Kenya on the night of 20 October 1952, the name of Mũmbi was invoked as a rallying call to unite the Agĩkũyũ in a fight for the independence of Kenya, under the banner of what came to be known as Mau Mau Uprising. Gakaara wa Wanjaũ published the Gĩkũyũ and Mũmbi creed, for which the colonial government put him in detention till 1960. Parallel to that several song books would be published under the name of Gĩkũyũ and Mũmbi.

Mũmbi is used as a female Gĩkũyũ name.
