= Catherine Karita =

Kenyan lawyer and IT expert

- Born: 1981 (age 44–45); Kabete, Kiambu County, Kenya
- Citizenship: Kenya
- Education: University of Maryland (Bachelor of Information Systems); University of Baltimore (Master of Business Administration); University of Nairobi (Bachelor of Laws)
- Occupations: Banker, Lawyer and Corporate Executive
- Years active: 2007–present
- Known for: Professional competence
- Title: Executive Director of NIC Securities, Nairobi, Kenya
- Family: One son, Nathan born c.2010

Catherine Karita is a Kenyan lawyer, businesswoman and corporate executive who serves as the executive director of NCBA Securities, an investment and stock brokerage firm that is a member of the NCBA Group Plc, a financial services conglomerate that is headquartered in Kenya, with branch offices in Rwanda, Uganda, and Tanzania.

== Background and education ==
Karita was born in Kabete, Kiambu County, circa 1981.

After attending local primary and secondary school, she was admitted to the University of Maryland, Baltimore County (UMBC), in the United States, where she graduated with a Bachelor of Information Systems degree. She continued on to the University of Baltimore, where she obtained her Master of Business Administration in 2007.

As of 2015, she was pursuing studies leading up to a Bachelor of Laws degree at the University of Nairobi.

== Career ==
Following her graduation with her MBA degree, Karita was employed by the Bank of America (BOA), for a period ending in 2009, when she returned to her native Kenya. She spent four years at BOA in various sales positions and in relationship management.

She was hired by CfC Stanbic Financial Services Limited in Nairobi, Kenya, as the Head of Corporate and Institutional Sales, effective in 2009. On 2 January 2013, Karita was hired by NIC Bank as General Manager of NIC Securities, where she is one of the 12 senior management executives.

== Other considerations ==
In August 2015, the Business Daily Africa newspaper, named Karita one of the Top 40 Under 40 Women In Kenya 2015. In December 2018, she was one of the five judges who selected the Top 40 Under 40 Men In Kenya 2018.

== See also ==
- Anne Kiunuhe
- Charity Wayua
