= Emily Waita Macharia =

Kenyan government affairs and sustainability leader (born 1980)

- Born: 1980 (age 45–46); Kenya
- Citizenship: Kenya
- Education: University of Nairobi (Bachelor of Arts in Economics); Strathmore University (Executive Management Program); Gordon Institute of Business Science (Advanced Management Program)
- Occupation: Public Relations Officer
- Years active: 2003 – present
- Known for: Business Administration
- Title: Senior Director of Public Affairs for Africa for The Coca-Cola Company

Emily Waita Macharia (née Emily Waita) is a Kenyan government affairs and sustainability officer who serves as the Senior Director of Public Affairs at The Coca-Cola Company, for Africa based in Nairobi, Kenya's capital city. In that capacity, she overseas public affairs matters for her employer, across 54 countries African countries.

== Background and education ==
She was born in Kenya, circa 1979. She attended the University of Nairobi, graduating with a Bachelor of Arts in Economics, in 2004.

She has also undergone training in an Executive Management Program at Strathmore University, in Nairobi, Kenya. Later she undertook training in an Advanced Management Program at the Gordon Institute of Business Science, the business school of the University of Pretoria.

== Career ==
For a period of nearly one and one half years Emily Waita served as the Vice President for Human Resources at AIESEC, the largest youth non-profit organisation in the world. She was based in Kenya and served part-time in Belgium. After that, she joined Greenpeace International, where she served as a team member of their "Africa Scoping Study Project" for the two years, ending in March 2006. She was based at the organisation's headquarters in Amsterdam, Netherlands. She then transferred to Alcatel-Lucent headquarters in Paris, France, where she worked as a Corporate Social Responsibility Associate, for just over one year.

In March 2007, she was hired as the Human Resources Manager at Lafarge-Holcim East Africa, serving there, in that capacity for nearly two years. She was then promoted to Manager of Group Corporate Affairs for the three group factories at Bamburi in Kenya, Hima in Uganda and Mbeya in Tanzania. She was based in Nairobi and served in this capacity for nearly four years.

Immediately prior to her current assignment at Coca-Cola, in August 2015, Ms Macharia served as the Regulatory Affairs Manager at British American Tobacco's Eastern Africa Markets, spanning the countries of the East African Community, the Horn of Africa and the Indian Ocean Islands, serving in that capacity, from 2012 until 2015.

== Other considerations ==
In September 2018, Business Daily Africa, an English daily newspaper in Kenya, named Emily Waita Macharia, one of the Kenya Top 40 Under 40 Women 2018. She is married to Kenneth Macharia.

== See also ==
- Joyce Mbui
- Charity Wayua
- Cynthia Wandia
