= Macharia =

Regions with significant populations
- Kenya

Languages
- Gĩkũyũ

Religion
- Agikuyu Religion

Related ethnic groups
- Bantu peoples Embu Meru Mbeere Kamba

Macharia is an African name from the Kikuyu people, the largest ethnic group in Kenya. It is given to baby boys. The name means "the one who looks" or "the one who searches"

- Emily Waita Macharia (born 1979), Kenyan public relations officer
- Faith Macharia (born 1976), Kenyan middle-distance runner and 2004 Olympian
- James Mwangi Macharia (born 1984), Kenyan road running athlete
- James Mwangi (born 1962), Kenyan accountant and banker, chief executive officer of Equity Bank Kenya Limited
- James Wainaina Macharia (born 1959), a Kenyan accountant
- Laila Macharia, Kenyan lawyer and entrepreneur, founder of Scion Real, a diversified investment firm
- Macharia Kamau (born 1958), Kenyan diplomat and UN representative
- Mumbi Macharia (born 1997), Kenyan spoken-word poet and writer
- Samuel Kamau Macharia (born 1942), Kenyan founder and chair of Royal Media Services, the largest private radio and television network in Eastern Africa.
