= Phyllis Wakiaga =

Kenyan lawyer and corporate executive (born 1982)

- Born: 1982 (age 43–44); Kenya
- Citizenship: Kenya
- Education: University of Nairobi (Bachelor of Laws) (Master of Laws); Kenya School of Law (Diploma in Law); Kenya Institute of Human Resources Management (Diploma in Human Resource Management); Jomo Kenyatta University of Agriculture and Technology (Master of Business Administration)
- Occupations: Lawyer, Corporate Executive
- Years active: 2007 — present
- Known for: Business Administration
- Title: Senior Private Sector Development Advisor at Tony Blair Institute for Global Change

Phyllis Wakiaga is a Kenyan lawyer and corporate executive. She is a senior development advisor at the Tony Blair Institute for Global Change. She is based in Nairobi, Kenya's capital city.

She served as the chief executive officer of the Kenya Association of Manufacturers, from 2015 until 2022.

== Background and education ==
She was born in Kenya, circa 1982. She studied law at the University of Nairobi, where she graduated with a Bachelor of Laws, in 2005. Later, the same university awarded her a Master of Laws, majoring in International Trade and Investment Law. She holds two diplomas; the first is a Diploma in Law, from the Kenya School of Law, and the other is a Diploma in Human Resource Management, from the Kenya Institute of Human Resources Management. Her master of Business Administration, was obtained from the Jomo Kenyatta University of Agriculture and Technology. She also studied at the Swedish Institute of Management, and is an alumnus of their program on "Sustainable Business Leadership and Corporate Social Responsibility".

== Career ==
In 2007, she began her career at Kenya Airways (KQ), as a "customer relations executive", serving in that capacity for three years. She was then appointed coordinator of government and industry affairs at KQ. Later she became the manager of the Government and Industry Affairs Division at the airline.

In 2013, she left KQ and joined the Kenya Association of Manufacturers (KAM), as the head of policy in charge of research and advocacy. In 2015, she was appointed as chief executive officer at KAM.

She describes her leadership style as "adaptive and situational". She emphasizes being a "team player", as vital to her success. "Success requires collective effort", she said.

== Other considerations ==
Phyllis Wakiaga, is a married mother of four children. She is of the Seventh-day Adventist faith, and she teaches bible study and music classes to children at her church.

== See also ==
- Economy of Kenya
- List of companies of Kenya
- Flora Mutahi
