= Emma Miloyo =

Kenyan architect (born 1980)

- Born: 1981 (age 44–45); Nairobi, Kenya
- Education: Jomo Kenyatta University
- Occupations: Architect, corporate executive
- Years active: 2007 – present
- Title: President of the Architectural Association of Kenya
- Term: March 2017 - present
- Spouse: Chris Naicca

Emma Miloyo is a Kenyan architect, who was reported, in 2017, to be the first woman president of the Architectural Association of Kenya. She serves as the first female president of the Architectural Association of Kenya since 2017. In October 2016, Archinect.com listed her among the five Emerging Female Architects of East Africa, in African Great Lakes region countries.

== Early life and education ==
She was born and raised in Nairobi, Kenya. For primary school she attended Loreto Convent Msongari, before transferring to The Kenya High School from 1995-1998. She studied architecture at Jomo Kenyatta University of Agriculture and Technology, graduating with a Bachelor of Architecture degree in 2006. Not only was she the first woman to graduate from Jomo Kenyatta University of Agriculture and Technology with a first-class honours degree in architecture, but she also went on to become the first female president of the Architectural Association of Kenya.

== Career ==
As of October 2018, Miloyo was a partner at the architectural firm Design Source, which she co-founded in January 2007, immediately after graduating from university. The firm has offices in Nairobi and Mombasa. She was a founding board member of the Konza Technology City Board.

In 2015, Miloyo was selected to participate in the 2nd Women's Leadership Program Eisenhower Fellows.

In June 2015, she was elected as Vice President of the Architectural Association of Kenya, serving in that capacity until February 2017. She became the first female president of the Architectural Association of Kenya in March 2017.

She is interested in inspiring young women to see architecture as a viable career option. In order to support young people, she volunteers her time to help girls in poverty attend school through the Ex-Bomarian Education Trust Fund and is a founding Board Member of WIRE (Women in Real Estate).

== Personal life ==
She is married with three children. Miloyo and Naicca are partners in Design Source Limited, the architectural firm they co-founded in 2007.

== Recognition ==
Business Daily Africa listed Miloyo as one of Kenya's Top 40 Under 40 Women both in 2011 and 2018.

== See also ==
- Topyster Muga
- Esther Muchemi
- Anne Wawira Njiru
