= Wanjiru =

Wanjiru is a name of Kikuyu origin that may refer to:

- The main character of a Kikuyu story, "Wanjiru, Sacrificed by Her People"
- Daniel Wanjiru (born 1992), Kenyan long-distance runner
- Esther Wanjiru (born 1977), Kenyan long-distance track and road runner and 1998 Commonwealth Games champion
- Esther Wanjiru Mwikamba, Kenyan crime victim in Dubai in 2012
- Helen Wanjiru Gichohi, Kenyan ecologist and President of the African Wildlife Foundation
- Grace Wanjiru (born 1979), Kenyan race walker and four-time African champion
- Margaret Wanjiru, Kenyan bishop and Member of the National Assembly for the Orange Democratic Movement
- Samuel Wanjiru (1986–2011), Kenyan marathon runner and 2008 Olympic champion
- Ruth Wanjiru (born 1981), Kenyan road runner based in Japan
- Veronica Nyaruai Wanjiru (born 1989), Kenyan middle- and long-distance runner
- Wanjiru Kamau-Rutenberg (born 1978), Kenyan political scientist

== See also ==
- Wanjiku, similar Kenyan name
