= Kagure Wamunyu =

Kenyan civil engineer (born 1989)

- Born: 1989 (age 36–37); Kiambu, Kenya
- Citizenship: Kenya
- Education: Alliance Girls High School (High School Diploma); Meredith College (Bachelor of Arts in Mathematics); North Carolina State University (Bachelor of Science in Civil Engineering); University of California Berkeley (Master of Science in City and Regional Planning); University of Oxford (Doctor of Philosophy) (In progress)
- Occupations: Civil engineer, Urban planner, Corporate executive
- Years active: 2011 – present
- Known for: Planning skills, Leadership
- Title: CEO, Africa Region at Kobo360

Kagure Wamunyu, is a Kenyan civil engineer, urban planner and the CEO and Co-Founder of Jumba, a construction tech start-up that is simplifying purchase and financing of construction materials in Africa. Previously, Kagure worked as the Global Head of Operations at Kobo360, an African freight logistics startup. She also served as the Senior Director of Strategy for Bridge International Academies in East Africa and as the Country Manager for Uber in Kenya.

== Background and education ==
Kagure attended Alliance Girls High School, in the town of Kikuyu, in Kiambu County, where she obtained her High School Diploma. She holds a Bachelor of Arts degree in Mathematics, from Meredith College in the state of North Carolina, in the United States, obtained in 2013. The same year, she graduated from North Carolina State University, with a Bachelor of Science in Civil Engineering degree.

She went on to obtain a Master of Science degree in City and Regional Planning, from the University of Berkeley, in 2015. As of November 2018, she was registered as a part-time PhD student at the University of Oxford, in the United Kingdom. Her doctoral focus is Sustainable Urban Development.

Her studies in the United States were partly sponsored by scholarships awarded by the Zawadi Africa Education Fund, founded and supported by Dr Susan Mboya, a daughter of the late Tom Mboya, one of Kenya's founding fathers. The Zawadi Fund, an American 501(c)3 non-profit, sponsors academically gifted, disadvantaged rural girls in Kenya, to study in American universities, then return to Kenya and contribute to national development.

== Work experience ==
After several part-time engagements in the United States, while at university, Kagure returned to Kenya in 2015. She was appointed as Head of Operations at Uber Kenya, based in Nairobi. After a period of nearly two years in that role, she was promoted to the position of Country Manager for Uber in Kenya, at the age of 27 years. In August 2017, she left Uber to take up a position as Senior Director of Strategy at Bridge International Academies.

In September 2018, Business Daily Africa, a Kenyan, English language, daily newspaper, named Kagure Wamunyu, among the "Top 40 Under 40 Women in Kenya in 2018".

In March 2019, Kagure joined Kobo360 where she is charged with the launch and growth of the company across Africa.

== Honors and awards ==
She has been honored with the following awards:

- 2013 Honoree :The Pamela Mboya Award by Zawadi Africa Education Fund
- 2013 Honoree : Who is Who in American Colleges and Universities
- 2011 Honoree : Sharon D. Banks Award by the Women in Transportation Organization
- 2010 Honoree : Outstanding Leadership Award by Meredith International Association.

== See also ==
- Gladys Ngetich
- Cynthia Wandia
- Charity Wayua
