= Cynthia Wandia =

Kenyan engineer, entrepreneur and corporate executive

- Born: 1986 (age 39–40); Kenya
- Education: Yale University (B.Sc.Eng.); Tuck School of Business (Advanced Management Program)
- Occupations: Electrical engineer; entrepreneur; corporate executive
- Years active: 2009–present
- Known for: Business Administration
- Title: Co-Founder & CEO of Kwara Limited

Cynthia Wandia is a Kenyan electrical engineer, polyglot, entrepreneur, businesswoman and corporate executive, who is the chief executive officer and co-founder of Kwara Limited, a Kenya-based online and mobile banking platform for financial cooperatives, credit unions and community banks. She is the managing director of ASTRA Innovations, a German-based enterprise that she co-founded.

== Background and education ==
She was born in Kenya, circa 1986. She attended Alliance Girls High School in the town of Kikuyu, in Kiambu County, in Kenya. She then went to the United States and enrolled in Yale University in 2005. Cynthia graduated in 2009 with a Bachelor of Science in Electrical Engineering. She followed that up with an Advanced Management Program at Dartmouth College.

== Career ==
Cynthia spent 6 months of 2010 in Monterrey, Mexico, as a business development consultant for Aceleradora de Empresas ITESM (the Business Accelerator Network at Tecnológico de Monterrey). She then moved to Düsseldorf, Germany to work with E.ON, in their global commodities division, as part of a trading qualification program. Some of the training took place in Madrid, Spain. She worked in that capacity for one and one half years, until May 2012.

For a period of two years and 6 months, she worked for E.ON, based in Essen, Germany, as a Fleet Performance Analyst for about half on that period, then as a Manager for Special Projects. In December 2014, she left E.ON and co-founded Astra Innovations.

Astra Innovations, sources closed gas-powered and hydroelectricity power plants, buys them cheaply and sells them to Sub-Saharan, Southeast Asian and Latin American electricity producers.

== Other considerations ==
Cynthia Wandia is reported to be fluent in the English language, Spanish, French, German and Mandarin. In 2018, Business Daily Africa, an English daily newspaper in Kenya, named Cynthia Wandia, one of the Kenya Top 40 Under 40 Women.

Her most recent enterprise, which she co-founded and for which she is the CEO, is Kwara Limited, an online and mobile banking application that helps cooperative societies, community banks and credit unions keep up with the financial needs and positions of their members in real-time. This allows the institutions to respond faster to the needs of their members, thereby maintaining high censuses of happy customers, driving up profits in the process.

== See also ==
- Topyster Muga
- Emma Miloyo
- Flora Mutahi
