= Mumbi (name) =

Mumbi is a name of Kenyan origin that may refer to:

- Mumbi Macharia (born 1997), Kenyan spoken-word poet
- Mumbi Maina (born 1985), Kenyan actress
- Julia Mumbi Muraga (born 1984), Kenyan long-distance runner
- Ruth Mumbi (born 1980), Kenyan human rights activist
- Sipho Mumbi (born 1983), retired Zambian footballer

== See also ==
- Mumbi, Kikuyu mythological female figure
