= Architectural Association (disambiguation) =

The Architectural Association is a British institution in London.

Architectural Association may also refer to:

- Architectural Association of Ireland
- Architectural Association of Kenya
- Birmingham Architectural Association, UK
- Edinburgh Architectural Association and Inverness Architectural Association, chapters of the Royal Incorporation of Architects in Scotland

== See also ==
- Royal Institute of British Architects
