= Topyster Muga =

Kenyan IT expert

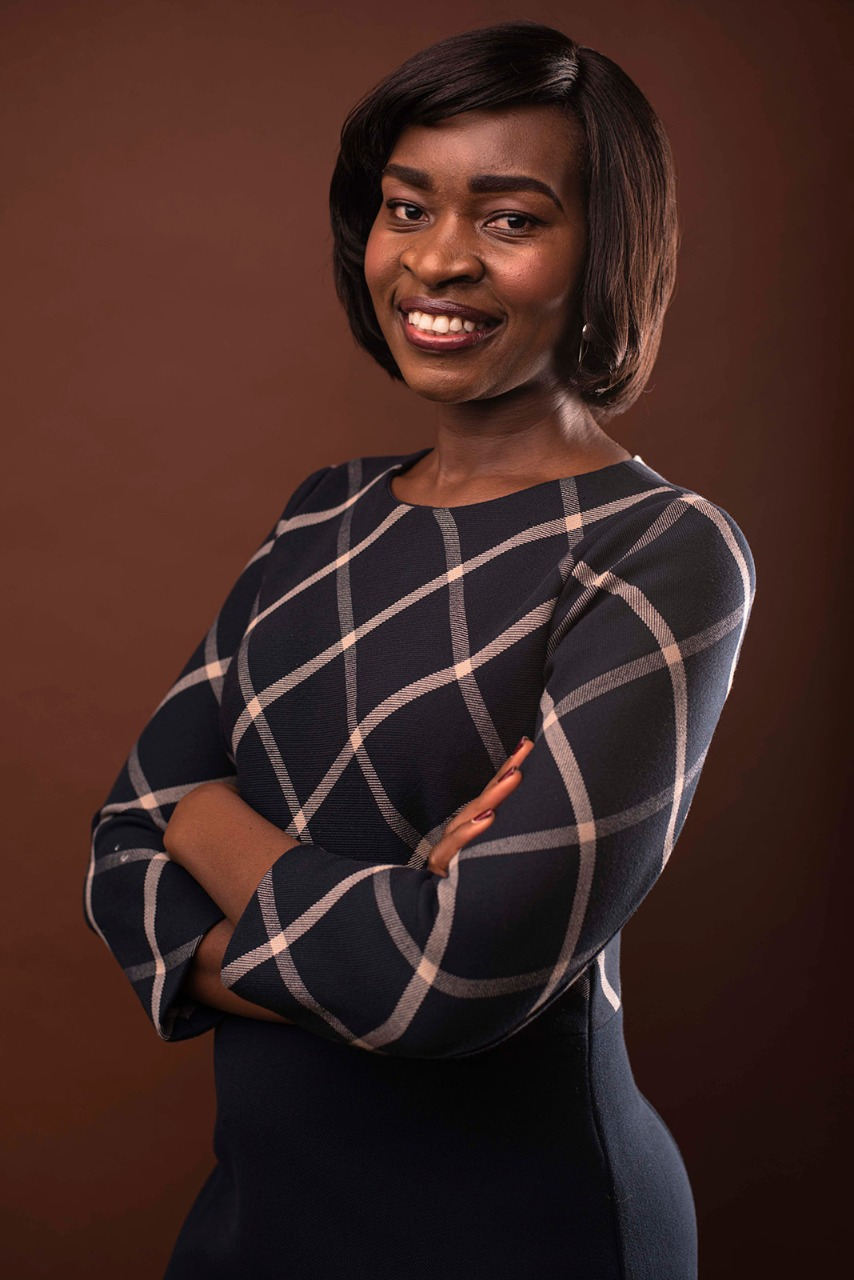
- Born: 1982 (age 43–44); Kenya
- Citizenship: Kenyan
- Education: Jomo Kenyatta University (Bachelor of Science in Information Technology); Strathmore University (Higher Diploma in Management of Information Systems); INSEAD Business School (Master of Business Administration)
- Occupations: IT expert, management professional & corporate executive
- Years active: 2003–present
- Title: Chief executive officer of Prosper App

Topyster Namasaka Muga (born 1982) is a Kenyan telecommunication and fintech specialist, who is the chief executive and founder of Prosper App. Before launching her own venture in July 2020, she was senior director of Financial Inclusion Africa, at Visa Inc., based in Nairobi. Prior to that, she headed Airtel Money in Kenya.

== Early life and education ==
Muga was born in Mumias, an urban center nestled in the western part of Kenya. She was raised alongside five brothers by her mother, who was a fishmonger. Her father, a court prosecutor in Kakamega, was a polygamist who married four wives and sired 16 children.

Muga attended Mumias Central Primary School and later Alliance Girls' Secondary School, where she sat for her KCSE exams. Upon completing high school, she enrolled at Strathmore University to pursue the IMIS Higher Diploma. She was named Best Student.

In 2005, Muga was admitted into Jomo Kenyatta University of Agriculture and Technology to earn a bachelor's degree in Information Technology. She graduated in the top 1% of her class two years later with First Class Honours.

She is an MBA holder from Institut Européen d'Administration des Affaires courtesy of the INSEAD MBA'75 Nelson Mandela Endowed Scholarship fund.

== Career ==
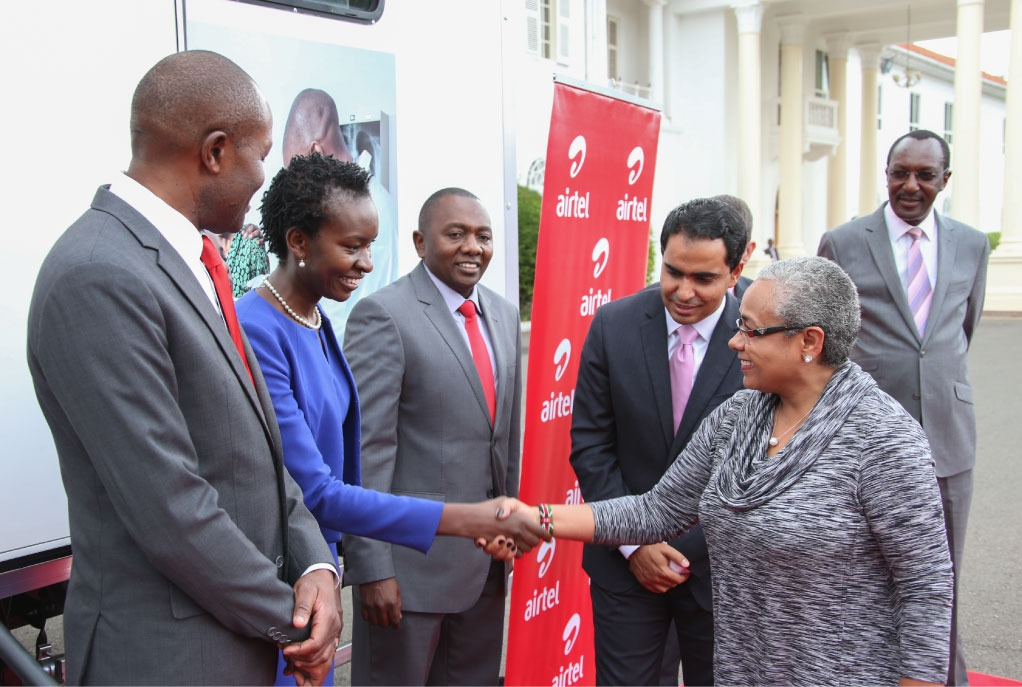
Topyster Muga greeting Margaret Kenyatta at Airtel Event

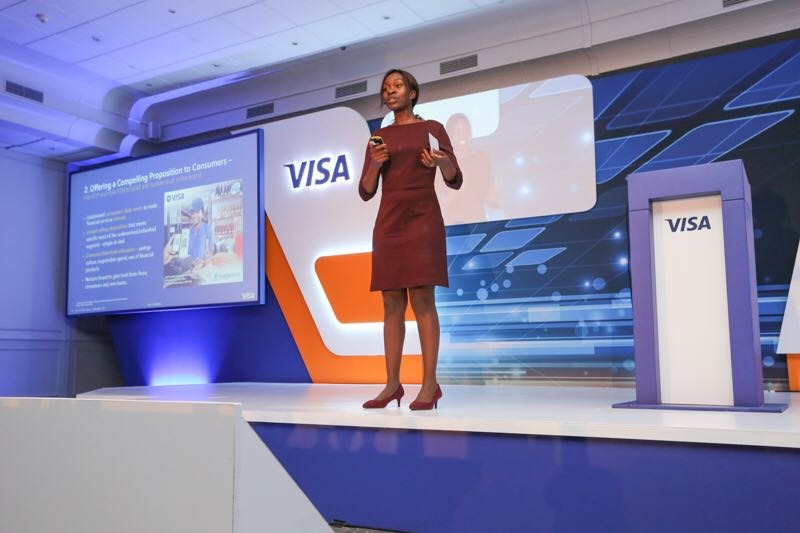
Muga giving a talk at Visa Inc. Kenya

After graduating from Strathmore University in 2003, Muga worked as an application and system support assistant in Barclays Bank of Kenya for approximately one year. The following year she was transferred to Barclays Bank of Uganda in the same role.

In 2005, she started at Airtel Kenya as an IT project coordinator and development engineer, while she concurrently pursued her first degree at Jomo Kenyatta University. Muga rose through the ranks securing a promotion every year. According to her profile on Airtel, she was the youngest female IT manager at 26 years.

In 2010, Muga joined Airtel Africa as a senior manager, Group Value Added Services. She held this position for a year before enrolling in INSEAD Business School in 2011.

In 2014, Bharti Airtel appointed her to head Airtel Money in Kenya. While in this role, she led the team that innovated Airtel Money Pesa Card, a Visa card that mirrored the Airtel Money account. Under her leadership, Airtel Money partnered up with United Bank of Kenya Limited to pioneer Akiba Mkononi, a mobile banking product that allowed its users to save on their phone.

After earning her MBA, Muga joined the Vodafone Group, as the M-Pesa principal product manager, based in the United Kingdom. In that role, she led M-Pesa's commercial product development in emerging markets, including Kenya, Tanzania, Mozambique, the Democratic Republic of the Congo, Albania and Romania.

Later, Visa Inc. hired her as the senior director for Financial Inclusion for sub-Saharan Africa. According to Apantech digital blog, She advocated for the socioeconomic financial inclusion of women in Kenya and several other African countries.

In July 2020, Muga launched a personal development app dubbed Prosper. She is the chief executive officer.

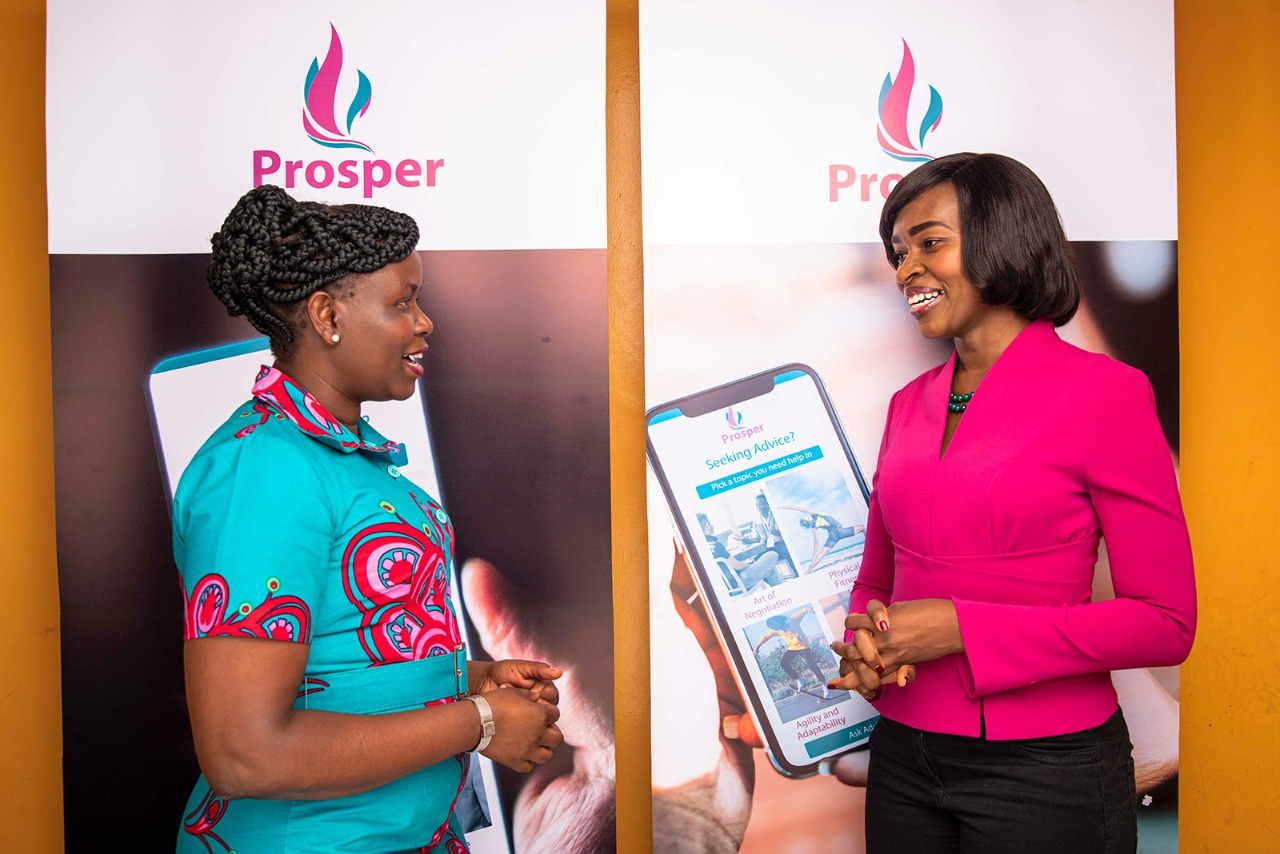
Prosper app launch

== Other achievements ==
Muga travels frequently and widely, giving lectures worldwide, including at the Financial Times summit in Lagos, Nigeria, in 2018, and at the World Economic Forum in South Africa in 2017.

She co-founded the Digniti Charitable Trust, and is a mentor at Zawadi Africa Education Fund. She is on the African Women in Fintech and Payments Advisory Board as the East African regional lead and Kenya's ambassador.

== Awards and recognition ==
Muga has garnered the following honours and awards thus far:

- INSEAD Nelson Mandela Scholarship - 2011
- Pink Potential Sub-Saharan Africa IT Woman of the Year- 2015
- Gold Stevie Technology Woman of the Year- 2016
- TechWomen Emerging Leader - 2017
- Women in Fintech Powerlist - 2017
- Top 40 Under 40 women in Kenya - 2018
