= Wangari =

Wangari is a name of Kikuyu origin that may refer to:

- Wangari Maathai (1940–2011), Kenyan environmental and political activist
- Catherine Wangari Wainaina (born 1985), Kenyan beauty pageant contestant
- Ruth Wangari Mwaniki (born 1963 or 1964), Kenyan politician
- Margaret Wangari Muriuki (born 1986), Kenyan middle- and long-distance runner
- Martha Wangari Karua (born 1957), Kenyan politician and former Minister of Justice
- Meriem Wangari (born 1979), Kenyan half marathon runner
- Wangari wa Nyatetu-Waigwa (1950–2024), Kenyan-American college professor
