= Wairimu =

Wairimu is a name of Kikuyu origin that may refer to:

- Wairimu Kiambuthi, Kenyan academic and film director
- Stellah Wairimu Bosire-Otieno (born 1986), Kenyan physician and corporate executive
- Alice Wairimu Nderitu (born 1968), Kenyan United Nations Special Adviser on the Prevention of Genocide to UN Secretary-General
- Brenda Wairimu (born 1989), Kenyan actress and model
- Jane Wairimu (born 1985), Kenyan female volleyball player
