= African Institute for Capacity Development =

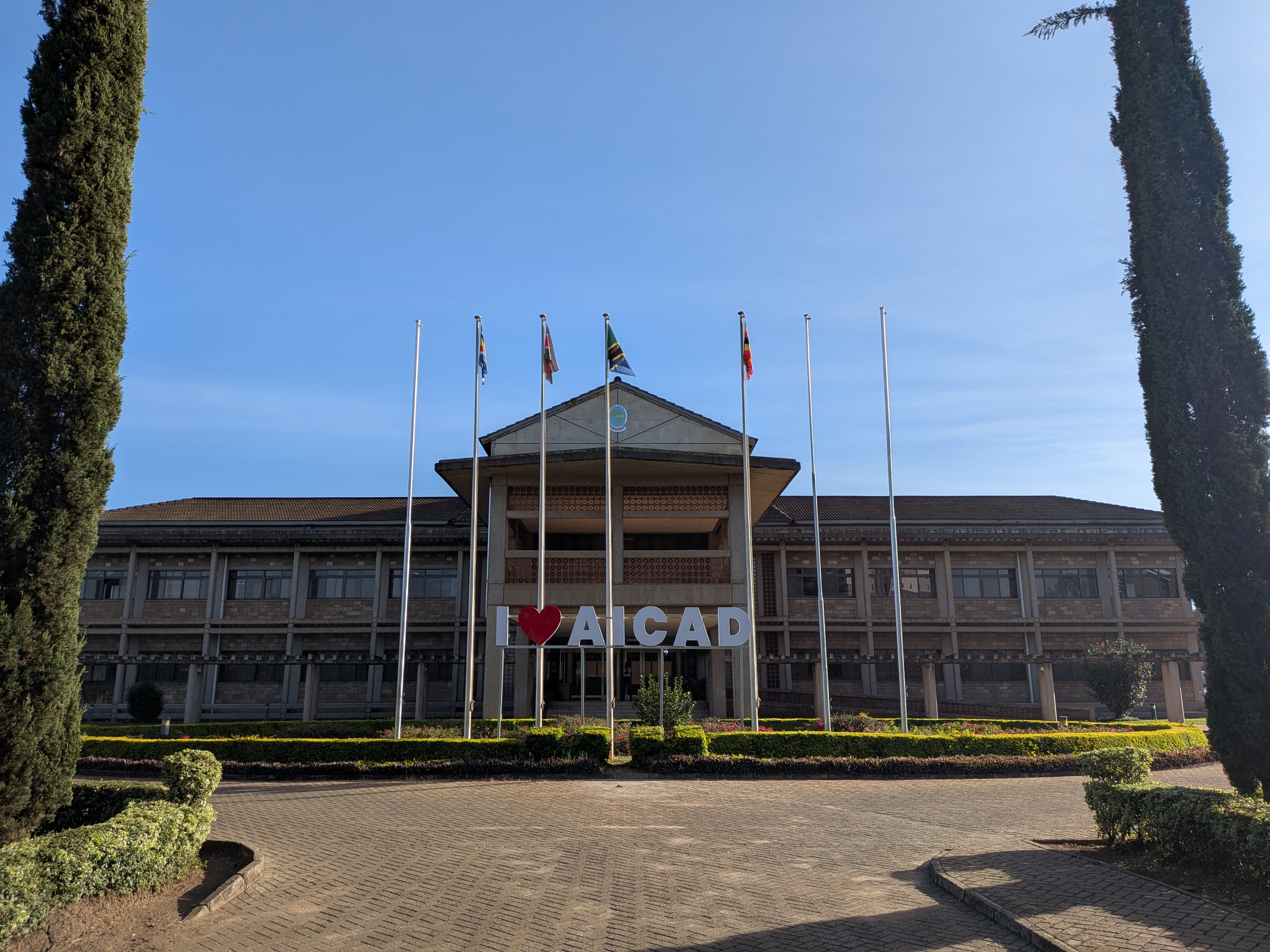
- The main building on the campus of the Jomo Kenyatta University of Agriculture and Technology
- Established: 2000
- Mission: To build human capacity for wealth creation through research and development, innovative training, information and knowledge sharing with academia, industry and communities
- Focus: Human capacity building
- President: Prof. James Njiru
- Location: Nairobi; Morogoro; Kampala
- Interactive map of African Institute for Capacity Development
- Website: https://www.aicad.or.ke/

The African Institute for Capacity Development (AICAD) is a regional, multi-national non-profit organization that was funded in 2000 and is jointly funded by the governments of Kenya, Tanzania, and Uganda. The institute focuses on reducing poverty through human resource capacity development across different disciplines, including agriculture, sustainability, natural resource management, and related policy implementation. It works through offering and hosting training courses on its campuses and a network of adjunct research scientists.

== History ==
The institute was started in 2000, with help of the Japan International Cooperation Agency (JICA). The Japanese Ministry of Foreign Affairs aimed to support the creation of the institute, to function as a center for training, joint research and development, and dissemination in three phases, including both financial support as well as sending experts for support. The idea for the institute grew out of the second Tokyo International Conference for African Development (TICAD II) in 1998 leading to AICAD's establishment on 1st August 2000 to contribute to the millennium goals, in particular poverty reduction.

A 2007 review of phase II of the institute's establishment found AICAD to 'conform fully' with the development policies of the contributing governments to promote sustainable growth, including the promotion of research and development, increasing in productivity and profitability of agriculture through technological innovations, and public action to eradicate poverty. A 2015 review of JICA's involvement following the end of phase III found the project 'partially satisfactory', finding effectiveness, impact, sustainability and efficiency of the project to be 'fair'. Between 2011-2015, the annual expenditure was between 1.5 and 1.9 million US Dollar, with Japan contributing 1,745,000 US Dollar between 2007-2011 .

In June 2025, Prof. James Njiru became the new Executive Director and CEO of the institute, following Prof. Dominic Byarugaba.

== Institute ==
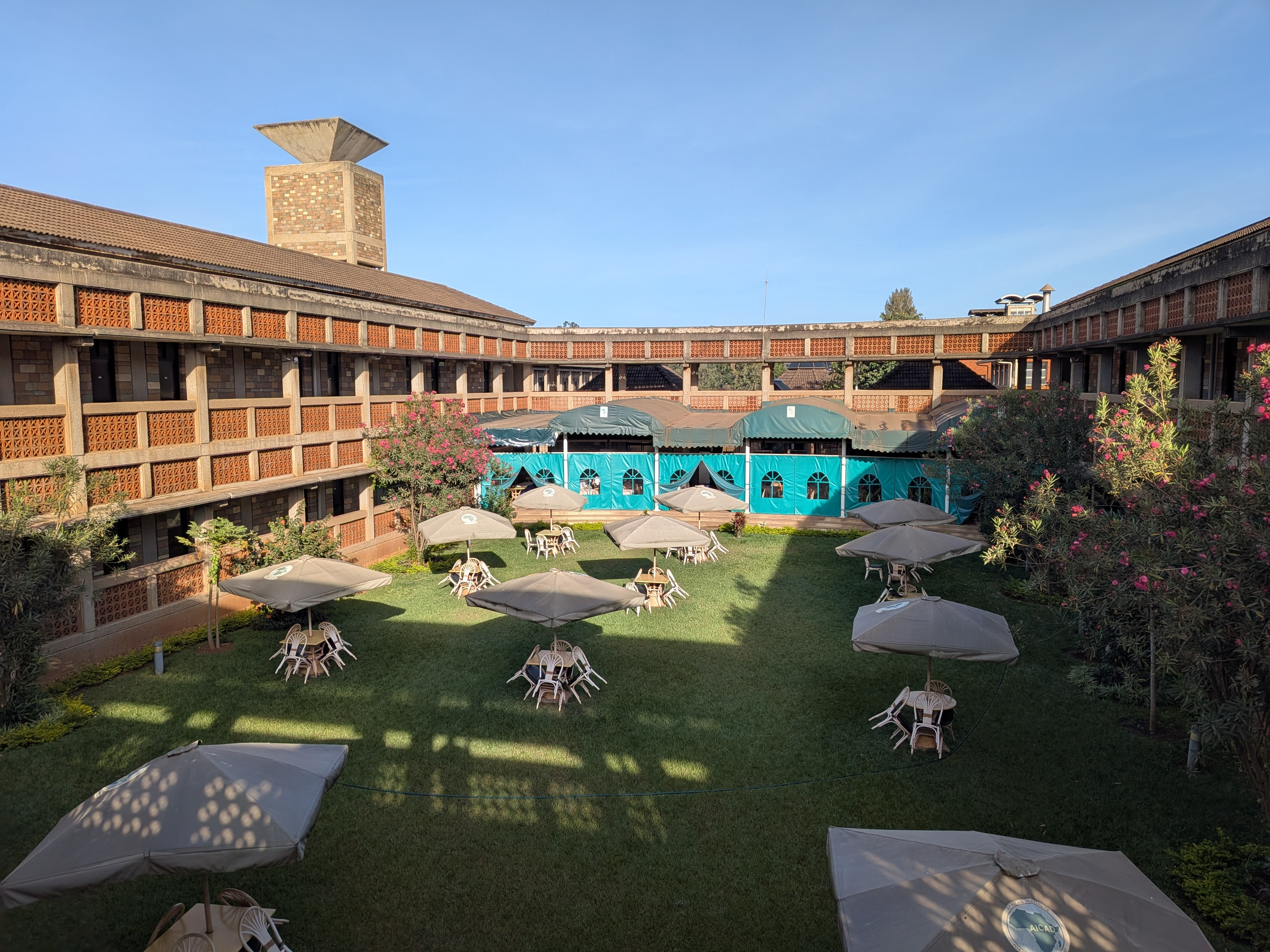
The guest house of the African Institute for Capacity Building

AICAD has its main office is on the campus of the Jomo Kenyatta University of Agriculture and Technology, with additional offices located at Egerton University, Sokoine University of Agriculture in Morogoro, Tanzania and Makerere University in Kampala, Uganda and partners with a wide range of universities in the participating countries and with international partners.

The institute is governed by a board that is led by the respective ministers of education or research of the participating countries.

AICAD runs a research & innovation (R&I) program as a collaboration hub that aims to convert scientific evidence into practical solutions through research and training, covering topics such as food production/security, environmental conservation, health equity and policy implementations. The institute also has an adjunct researcher program to bring international researchers to work together with AICAD researchers.

Additionally, AICAD hosts and runs a wide range of training programs, both in its local offices and in other African countries. The main campus in the Jomo Kenyatta University of Agriculture and Technology includes a guest house to host visiting trainees and researchers and provides a cafeteria and gym facilities.

== Gallery ==
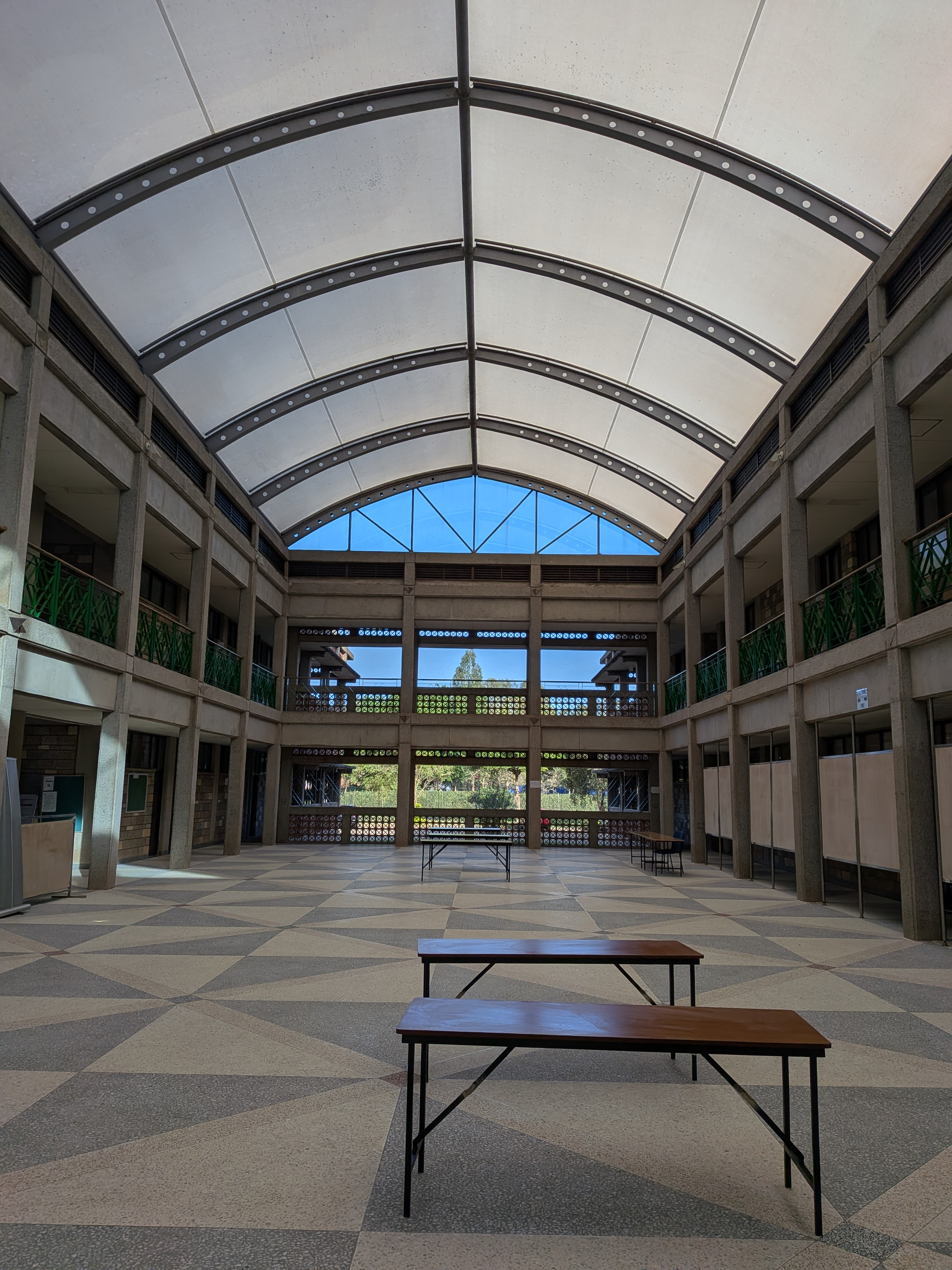
The hall in the main building

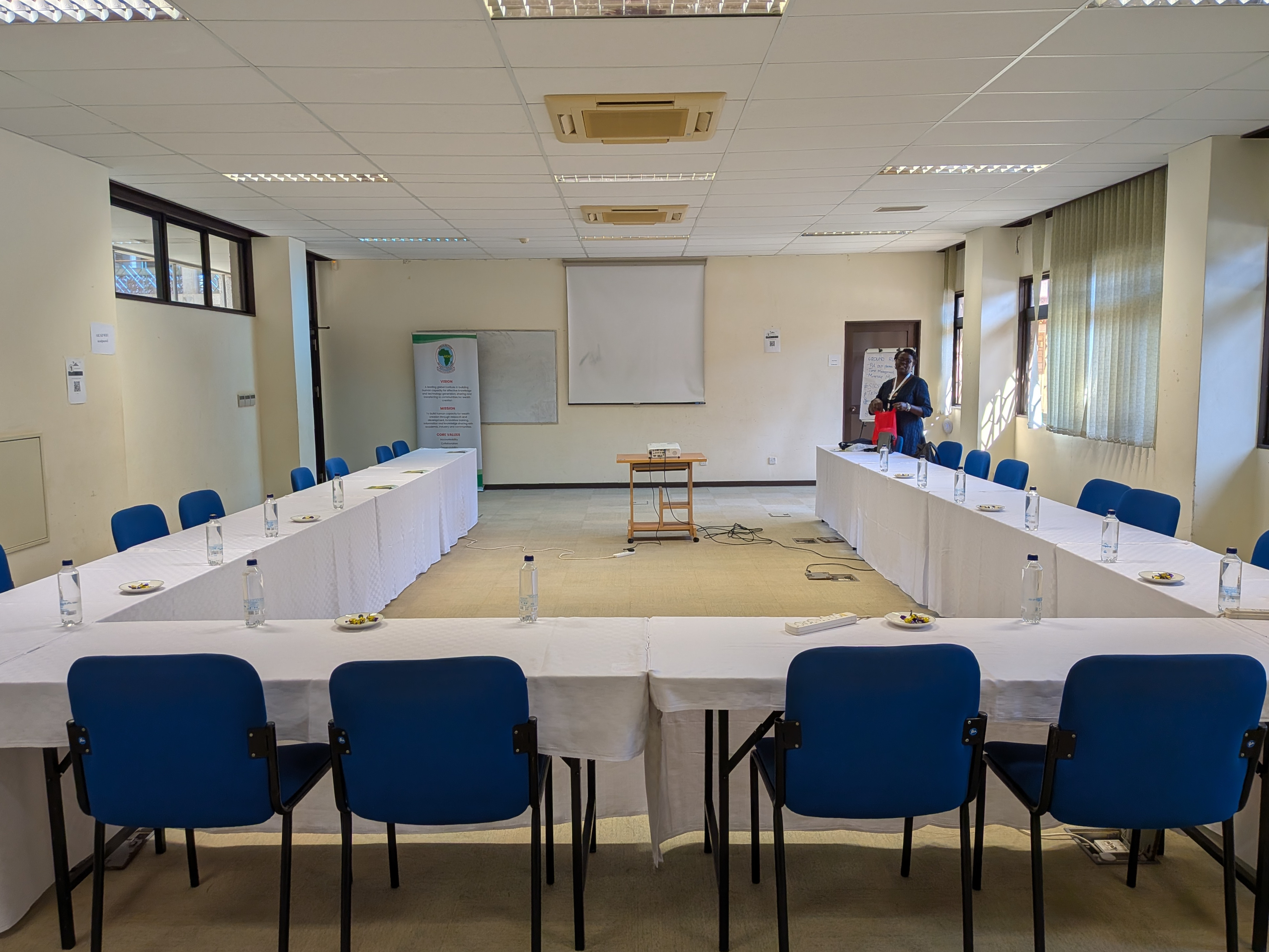
One of the workshop rooms, during the 2026 Summer Institute in Computational Social Science
