= Wambui =

Wambui is a name of Kikuyu origin that may refer to:

- Wambui Ngugi, member of the Kenyan African pop group Elani
- Wambui Otieno (1936–2011)), Kenyan activist, politician and writer
- Beth Wambui Mugo (born 1959), Kenyan politician
- Joyce Wambui Njuguna (born 1976), Kenyan powerlifter
- Lucy Wambui Murigi (born 1985), Kenyan female mountain runner
- Margaret Wambui (born 1995), Kenyan middle-distance runner
- Mary Wambui, Kenyan businesswoman and politician
- Nancy Wambui (born 1986), Kenyan long-distance runner
