= Mabel Imbuga =

Kenya Academic Administrator

Jomo Kenyatta University of Agriculture and Technology

Vice-Chancellor
- In office August 2008 – August 2018
- Preceded by: Nick Wanjohi
- Succeeded by: Victoria Wambui Ngumi

Personal details
- Born: July 7, 1951 (age 74) Kenya
- Citizenship: Kenya
- Spouse: Francis Imbuga died on November 18, 1986 (aged 49)
- Children: 5
- Education: University of Nairobi (BSc, MSc, PhD); Eastern and Southern African Management Institute (Executive MBA)
- Occupation: Biochemist, academic administrator

Mabel Imbuga (born 7 July 1951) is a Kenyan biochemist and academic administrator who served as the Vice-Chancellor of the Jomo Kenyatta University of Agriculture and Technology (JKUAT) from August 2008 to August 2018. She was the first woman to hold the position at JKUAT and the second female vice-chancellor in Kenya.She specialises in molecular biology and infectious diseases.

== Early life and education ==
Imbuga was born on 7 July 1951 in Kenya. She is widowed, with five children. Her late husband, Francis Imbuga, was a Kenyan playwright and professor of literature who died in 1986. Imbuga earned her Bachelor of Science (BSc Honours) in Biochemistry from the University of Nairobi between 1977 and 1979. She continued at the same institution, obtaining a Master of Science (MSc) in Biochemistry from 1982 to 1988 and a PhD in Biochemistry in 1991. She completed a Post-Doctoral Fellowship at the International Centre of Insect Physiology and Ecology (ICIPE). In 2006–2008, she obtained an Executive MBA in Strategic Management from the Eastern and Southern African Management Institute (ESAMI).

== Academic career ==
Imbuga began her career as a Research Assistant at the Wellcome Trust Research Laboratories, focusing on the biochemistry of schistosomiasis, from 1975 to 1976. She joined the University of Nairobi as a Tutorial Fellow in the Department of Biochemistry from 1979 to 1980, advancing to Lecturer (1980–1985) and Senior Lecturer (1996). In 1997, she moved to JKUAT as an Associate Professor in the Department of Biochemistry, becoming Chairperson of the department from 1997 to 1999. She was promoted to full Professor in 2004 and served as Dean of the Faculty of Science from 1999 to 2004. From 2003 to 2005, she directed the Institute of Tropical Medicine and Infectious Diseases (ITROMID).

== Membership and fellowship ==
Imbuga is a founding fellow of the Biochemical Society of Kenya, a member of Natural Products Research Network for Eastern and Central Africa (NAPRECA), a founding member and former president of African Women in Science and Engineering, and the past director for English Speaking Africa at the International Network of Women Engineers and Scientists.

== Administrative career ==
Imbuga served as Deputy Vice-Chancellor for Academic Affairs at JKUAT from 2005 to 2008, during which she held roles including Deputy Vice-Chancellor for Research, Production, and Extension (2006–2007) and for Administration, Planning, and Development (2006). She became Acting Vice-Chancellor in March 2008 and was appointed substantive Vice-Chancellor in August 2008, serving until August 2018.
