= Ruth Mumbi =

Kenyan social activist

Ruth Mūmbi
- Born: Ruth Mūmbi; 6 November 1980 (age 45); Kiamaiko, Nairobi, Kenya
- Occupations: Human Rights Defender, Community Organiser
- Years active: Late 1990s–present
- Notable work: Founder – Women Collective‑Kenya; Founder/Coordinator – Bunge la Wamama Mashinani

Ruth Mūmbi (born 6 November 1980) is the founder and currently serving as the Executive Director of Women Collective‑Kenya (WCK), a community‑based organization advocating for the rights of women in Kenya’s informal settlements. She is a human rights defender, community organizer, and women’s rights activist whose work spans reproductive health, water access, housing rights, police accountability, and urban justice. She also coordinates Bunge la Wamama Mashinani, a grassroots women’s movement in Nairobi’s informal settlements.

== Early life and background ==
Ruth Mūmbi was born on 6 November 1980 in Kìamaiko, an informal settlement in Nairobi, Kenya. She lost her father at around ten years of age, which intensified her family’s vulnerability in a context of poverty and informality. Growing up amidst structural inequality, informal housing, and limited access to basic services strongly influenced her later activism.

== Formative influences ==
Her early involvement in community organizing included documenting extrajudicial killings, forced disappearances, and other forms of state violence in Mathare/Kìamaiko. She has cited that “no one had the guts to talk about it,” and this early human-rights documentation formed the foundation of her career as a defender. In 2014, she participated in a protective fellowship at the University of York’s Centre for Applied Human Rights (UK), further strengthening her advocacy skills and international exposure.

== Organizing and activism ==
=== Early activism ===
By the late 1990s and early 2000s, Mūmbi was actively mobilizing communities around state violence, forced evictions, maternal health failures, and gender-based violations. She founded “Warembo Ni Yes” (“Young Women Say Yes”), a group mobilizing young women to participate in Kenya’s 2010 constitutional referendum process.

=== Bunge la Wamama Mashinani ===
In 2008–2009, Mūmbi founded Bunge la Wamama Mashinani (“Women’s Parliament at the Grassroots”), a women-led grassroots movement in Nairobi’s informal settlements.

The movement focuses on:

- Maternal mortality in settlement maternity wards
- Police violence, extrajudicial killings, and forced disappearances
- Evictions, sanitation, housing, and environmental rights
- Reproductive health and access to justice for women and girls

=== Women Collective-Kenya ===
Mūmbi serves as Executive Director of WCK, a community-based organization addressing gender justice, reproductive rights, urban marginalization, water and sanitation, and informal-economy labour rights.

Key initiatives under her leadership include:

- Advocacy to repeal sections of Kenya’s Penal Code criminalizing sex work (February 2025)
- Campaigns for reforms in abortion and reproductive rights policies, linking access to class and settlement disadvantage (September 2025)

== Major campaigns and advocacy ==
=== Reproductive health & unsafe abortion ===
Mūmbi emphasizes that unsafe abortion disproportionately affects poor women and girls, stating it is “a class issue.” She works with survivors of sexual violence, early pregnancies, and supports safe health services and legal remedies.

=== Water justice & urban informality ===
She coordinates the Nairobi Water Justice Working Group, highlighting how privatized water services disproportionately burden women in informal settlements.

=== Evictions, housing & settlement rights ===
Mūmbi has campaigned against forced evictions, advocating for decent sanitation and accountability. In May 2020, she received a death threat linked to her work on the eviction of Kariobangi Sewage Village residents.

=== Police accountability & human rights documentation ===
She has documented extrajudicial killings, forced disappearances, and police misconduct in informal settlements. Mūmbi has faced harassment, arrest, and detention for her activism.

== Recognition and fellowships ==
- Finalist, Front Line Award for Human Rights Defenders at Risk (2013)
- Protective Fellowship, Centre for Applied Human Rights, University of York, UK (Autumn 2014)
- Featured in The Carter Center campaign “When You Empower a Woman, You Empower the Whole World” (2017)

== Challenges and harassment ==
- 2011: Charged with incitement over protests against maternal deaths; remanded.
- Reports of detention without trial, assault, and threats from state and informal actors.
- May 2020: Received death threat linked to eviction advocacy.

== Political engagement ==
In August 2022, Mūmbi ran for the Kìamaiko ward seat in Nairobi County Assembly elections, placing sixth out of thirteen candidates. She publicly supported former Justice Minister Martha Karua and participated in petitions challenging presidential election results.

== Media, publications & public voice ==
- YouTube: “Strength of a Woman: Ruth Mūmbi” (2014)
- Op-ed in openDemocracy: “‘Unsafe abortion is a class issue’ explains Kenyan activist Ruth Mūmbi” (14 Sept 2020)
- Featured in Kenyan media (May 2024) highlighting women’s contributions to liberation movements.

== Personal life ==
Mūmbi continues to live and work in the settlement contexts (Kìamaiko/Mathare) that shaped her activism. She also works to support girls affected by forced marriages and early pregnancies from across Kenya, including pastoral communities, finding ways to help them continue their education and access protection.

== Impact and legacy ==
Ruth Mūmbi’s activism has:

- Empowered women in informal settlements to know their rights and organize politically.
- Brought visibility to maternal mortality, extrajudicial killings, water injustice, forced evictions, and reproductive rights.
- Linked gender justice with class, labour rights, and urban inequality.
- Demonstrated grassroots feminist leadership while confronting state and private actors.
