= Wanjiru, Sacrificed by Her People =

Kikuyu tale

"Wanjiru, Sacrificed by Her People" is the title given to a story of the Kikuyu people living in what is now Central Kenya.

== Plot ==
"Wanjiru, Sacrificed by Her People" is the title given to a Kikuyu tale of a young woman who is sacrificed by her people to counter a drought. While she slowly sinks under ground, the rains begin to fall. A young warrior who loved her seeks her; when he gets to the place where she sank down, he sinks also, and follows her trail into the underworld. She is in a terrible state, but he tells her he will put her on his back and take her away. Unlike Orpheus, however, the young man makes no "tragic mistake" and he and Wanjiru leave the underworld alive. He tells her people they treated her "shamefully", and marries her—though he grudgingly pays her bride price.

== History ==
The Kikuyu people are native to what is now Central Kenya. The story was recorded through the work of William and Katherine Routledge, who recorded the tale and published it in 1910. The tale was told to them by one of the Kikuyu people who visited their camp (after 1906) in what was then British East Africa. Other titles include "The girl who was sacrificed by her kin", and varieties thereof.
