= Wangarĩ wa Nyatetũ-Waigwa =

Kenyan university professor

- Born: Anne Elizabeth Wangarĩ Waigwa; 31 July 1950; Nyeri, Kenya (then Kenya Colony, British East Africa)
- Died: 4 February 2024 (aged 73); Ogden, Utah, USA
- Other names: Wangarĩ Waigwa-Stone

Wangarĩ wa Nyatetũ-Waigwa (31 July 1950 – 4 February 2024), born Anne Elizabeth Wangarĩ Waigwa, also known as Wangarĩ Mũringĩ Waigwa-Stone, was a Kenyan literary scholar and university professor. She taught French, women's studies, and Swahili courses at Weber State University in Ogden, Utah.

== Early life and education ==
Anne Elizabeth Wangarĩ Waigwa was born into a Kikuyu family and brought up on a farm near Nyeri, Kenya, the daughter of Samuel Waigwa wa Gatamũ and Salome Nyatetũ wa Nganga. "I was raised under an African sky," she told Terry Tempest Williams. "Darkness was never something I was afraid of."

Wangarĩ attended Alliance Girls High School from January 1964 to December 1969. She studied French there, in Madagascar, and in France. She earned a bachelor's degree at the University of Dijon in 1974, and a teaching certificate at the University of Grenoble. She moved to the United States for postgraduate studies in September 1980 and earned her doctoral degree at the University of Utah. Her PhD thesis was titled "The Liminal Novel: Studies in the French-African Bildungsroman of the 1950s" (1989).

== Career ==
Returning to Kenya after her undergraduate studies, Wangarĩ wa Nyatetũ-Waigwa taught at Alliance Girls' High School (AGHS) from 1974 to 1980. Beginning in 1990, Professor Wangarĩ taught French, women's studies, and Swahili at Weber State University. As part of her public service, Dr Wangarĩ was on the board of the Utah Humanities Council from 1993 to 1999. She also started and directed a youth performance group, TOUCH (Teens of Ogden United for Community Harmony), and raised funds for education in Kenya through her Amani (Peace) Endowment. She was a ruling elder at First Presbyterian Church of Ogden, and led its women's vocal group, the Grace Notes; she also founded the annual Festival of Song at the church and organised it for many years.

== Publications ==
- "From Liminality to a Home of Her Own? The Quest Motif in Maryse Conde's Fiction" (1995)
- The Liminal Novel: Studies in the Francophone-African Novel as Bildungsroman (Peter Lang Publishing, 1996; a book expanded and revised from her PhD thesis)
- "The Female Liminal Place, or Survival Between the Rock and the Hard Place: A Reading of Anne Hébert's L'île de la Demoiselle" (2001)

== Personal life ==
Wangarĩ married a fellow AGHS teacher, American-born Christopher Stone, in July 1980, and they had two sons. She became a naturalised US citizen in 2003. She died in 2024, at the age of 73, after several years with Alzheimer's disease.
