= Nyambura =

Nyambura is a name of Kikuyu origin that may refer to:

- Catherine Nyambura Ndereba (born 1972), Kenyan marathon runner
- Chief Nyambura (born 1991), Kenyan international footballer
- Jane Nyambura (1964/1965–2010), Kenyan singer known as Queen Jane
- Judith Nyambura Mwangi (born 1986), Kenyan singer known as Avril
- Nyambura Njoroge (born 1956), Kenyan feminist theologian and ecumenical leader
- Stella Nyambura Mwangi (born 1986), Kenyan-Norwegian musician
- Virginia Nyambura (born 1993), Kenyan steeplechase runner
