= Death of Esther Mwikamba =

Esther Wanjiru Mwikamba was a Kenyan woman who died on March 20, 2012, following a coma state since February 18, 2012, when she was brutally assaulted for questioning the molestation of her friend, while she with her friends were leaving a night club in Dubai.

== The incident ==
The incident happened in the early hours of February 18, 2012, at the car park behind the Crowne Plaza Hotel on Sheikh Zayed Road, Dubai.

Esther with two other women were walking to a waiting taxi during dark early morning when a group of young men in their early twenties approached them uninvited. Eyewitnesses alleged that unwarranted advances by one male led to the violence. They claimed that he groped one of the women on her buttocks. One of the women, Susan Wanjiru, said she immediately protested in very clear terms and told the offending man to leave her friend alone. The unidentified man answered with a punch to Susan's face, she claimed. When Susan was knocked from her feet, Esther attempted to defend her friend, throwing one of her shoes in the direction of the assailant.

According to Susan, the group of men quickly gathered up their male friend and placed him in a four-wheel-drive vehicle to defuse the scene and apologized saying that he was drunk. But the man left the vehicle, then allegedly punched Esther in the face, knocking her to the ground, and began kicking her in the head.

Her friends said that the assailant repeatedly kicked Esther in the head, even though her friends resisted, while she was lying on the ground defenseless, bleeding from her ears, nose, and mouth.

== The victim ==
The victim, Esther was 26 at the time of attack and was working in a retail store and was formerly a sales clerk at a major store in the Dubai mall. She was described by her friends as a "petite young woman full of life and strong mind with a personality and zest for life leads her to speak her mind and often help friends".

== Treatment and death of the victim ==
Esther was immediately rushed to Rashid Hospital, Dubai by an ambulance and eyewitnesses said that she was bleeding from her ears, nose and mouth. She was admitted to intensive care unit where she remained in coma stage till her death.

Kenyan community in the UAE, supported by the Kenyan Embassy, Abu Dhabi and the Kenyan Welfare Association, Dubai helped her mother Hanna Mwikama to come to Dubai and spend at her daughter's bedside during her last 3 weeks in coma. She succumbed to death on March 20, 2012, early morning after being in coma stage for 30 days.

== The perpetrator ==
A 23-year-old jobless Emirati was arrested following the incident and was charged with 'assault leading to death' and for sexually molesting Esther's friend.

== Punishment ==
The Dubai court convicted the Emirati perpetrator of assault leading to death and handed down the three-year sentence. The defendant was given another year behind bars for sexually molesting Esther’s friend. According to UAE law the maximum penalty for assault leading to death is 10 years in jail. In May 2012, he admitted beating her, yet he declared «I never meant to kill Esther». In July, the mother of the victim requested to meet with the killer, and readers of the country's newspapers The National created a community of support to provide financial assistance to the family of the victim. In November, the killer lost his appeal to reduce his four-year sentence.

== See also ==
- Murder of Kelsey Smith
- Murder of Penny Bell
- Murder of Daniel Morgan
- 2012 Delhi gang rape case
- Murder of Kitty Genovese
- Soumya Murder Case
