= Anne Kiunuhe =

Kenyan lawyer and accountant

- Born: 1979 (age 46–47); Kenya
- Citizenship: Kenya
- Education: University of Nairobi (Bachelor of Laws); Kenya School of Law (Advocates Training Program); Institute of Certified Public Accountants of Kenya (CPA)
- Occupations: Corporate attorney & accountant
- Years active: 2005–present
- Title: Partner, Corporate Department, at Anjarwalla & Khanna Law Firm, Nairobi, Kenya

Anne Kiunuhe is a Kenyan lawyer and accountant, who is a partner in the Corporate Department at Anjarwalla & Khanna Law Firm, in Nairobi, Kenya's capital city. She serves as the editor of Legal Notes, a quarterly newsletter published by Africa Legal Network (ALN), an alliance of law firms in 16 African jurisdictions.

== Background ==
She was born in Kenya in the 1970s. After attending local primary and secondary schools, she was admitted to the University of Nairobi, where she studied law, graduating in 2003 with a Bachelor of Laws degree. She underwent training in the Advocates Training Programme, at the Kenya School of Law in 2004. Kiunuhe is also a qualified CPA.

== Career ==
She has legal experience of more than 10 years, as of December 2018. She specializes in competition law, intellectual property law, Information technology law, telecommunications law and mergers & acquisitions. She serves as the co-head of the Competition Law Department at her law firm. She is recognized as a leader in competition law by her peers.

== Other considerations ==
Anne Kiunuhe has served as faculty in anti-trust law for the American Bar Association. She served as a lead-organizer of the first joint COMESA/Kenya Competition Conference. She represented Kenyan interests at the COMESA Competition Workshop 2014.

She is a prolific writer on contemporary legal topics and a regular speaker at corporate law conferences. In 2015, she won the CFC Stanbic Rising Star Award, in the Professional Services category. The award "recognizes young, talented people, aged 28-40, who have a capacity for achievement, success and make a valuable difference".

In December 2018, she served as a member of a panel of five judges who selected the "Top 40 Men Under 40 In Kenya 2018".
