= Charity Wayua =

Kenyan scientist and researcher

- Born: 1985 (age 40–41); Kenya
- Citizenship: Kenya
- Education: Alliance Girls High School (High School Diploma); Xavier University (Bachelor of Science in Chemistry); Purdue University (Doctor of Philosophy in Medicinal and Pharmaceutical Chemistry)
- Occupation: Research Scientist
- Years active: 2007 — present
- Known for: Administrative Skills, Research
- Title: Director at IBM Research Africa
- Relatives: Ken Mbuki (sibling)

Charity Wayua (born 1985) is a Kenyan chemist and researcher, who serves as a Research Director International Business Machines (IBM), based in the Nairobi and Johanessburg area.

== Background and education ==
Charity attended Alliance Girls High School, in the town of Kikuyu, in Kiambu County, where she obtained her High School Diploma, in 2002. She holds a Bachelor of Science degree in Chemistry, from Xavier University in the United States, obtained in 2007. Her Doctor of Philosophy degree in Medicinal and Pharmaceutical Chemistry, was awarded in 2011, by Purdue University, in the state of Indiana, United States.

Her studies in the United States were sponsored by scholarships awarded by the Zawadi Africa Education Fund, founded and supported by Susan Mboya, a daughter of the late Tom Mboya, one of Kenya's founding fathers. The Zawadi Fund, an American 501(c)3 non-profit, sponsors academically gifted, disadvantaged rural girls in Kenya, to study in American universities, then return to Kenya and contribute to national development.

== Work experience ==
For a period of two years following her undergraduate degree, Charity taught undergraduate chemistry as a teaching assistant, at Purdue University, at West Lafayette, Indiana, until August 2009.

Following the completion of her doctoral studies, she was hired by IBM as research scientist for the Africa region, based in Nairobi, the capital city of Kenya.

The team of researchers that she leads are charged with developing "commercially viable technologies" that improve how governments work and serve their citizens. The work her team carried out in collaboration with the Kenyan government, between 2013 and 2014, is credited with improving Kenya's ranking on the World Bank annual Ease of Doing Business ranking, advancing by 21 spots.

In June 2018, Charity Wayua was promoted to Corporate Strategy Associate at IBM, and continues to work both in Nairobi, Kenya and at corporate headquarters in Armonk, New York State.

== Other considerations ==
In September 2018, Business Daily Africa, a Kenyan, English language, daily newspaper, named Charity Wayua, among the "Top 40 Under 40 Women in Kenya in 2018".

== See also ==
- Gladys Ngetich
- Sianto Sitawa
- Cynthia Wandia
- Kagure Wamunyu
