= Esther Muchemi =

Kenyan businesswoman

Esther Mūchemi
- Born: Kenya
- Education: University of Nairobi (Bachelor of Commerce); Institute of Certified Public Accountants of Kenya (CPA)
- Occupations: Accountant, businesswoman and corporate executive
- Years active: 1981–present
- Title: Executive director & group CEO of Samchi Group of Companies

Esther Mūchemi is an accountant, businesswoman, entrepreneur and corporate executive in Kenya. She serves as the group chief executive officer of the Samchi Group of Companies, a diverse Kenyan conglomerate, whose companies span telecommunications, microfinance, hospitality, real estate, restaurants and ICT.

== Background ==
Mūchemi was born in Kenya and attended local schools for her primary and secondary education. She graduated from the University of Nairobi with a Bachelor of Commerce degree.

She trained as an accountant and practiced as an auditor for twenty years, before striking out as an entrepreneur on her own.

She is also a certified public accountant (CPA) with the Institute of Certified Public Accountants of Kenya.

== Career ==
Beginning in 1984, Muchemi was employed in the accounting industry as an auditor. In 2000, she quit her regular employment and opened a retail shop on Koinange Street, in downtown Nairobi, Kenya's capital city, selling Safaricom sim-cards and airtime. Over the years she slowly expanded her empire into an investment group with nearly a dozen businesses.

== Samchi Group ==
Mūchemi organizes her businesses under the umbrella known as the Samchi Group of Companies. The group includes Samchi Telecommunications Limited, Jumbo Communications Limited, Forward Airtime Limited, and Mergut Limited, all in the telecommunications sector.

Other companies in the group are Samchi Credit Limited, a microfinance company; Samchi Heights Limited, a real estate development company; After 40 Hotel Limited, along Biashara Street in Nairobi; El-Roi Plaza, a shopping arcade along Tom Mboya Street in Nairobi; Heavenly Wings Limited, a restaurant in El-Roi Plaza; and a virtual office company called Space International Limited. In 2018, the Samchi Group employed a total of 560 people.

== Other considerations ==
In 2017, Mūchemi was the recipient of the 2017 Global Inspirational Women Leadership Award, awarded by the Centre for Economic and Leadership Development. She received the award at the 2017 South America–Africa–Middle East–Asia Women Summit, held in Dubai, United Arab Emirates. In the same year, she was inducted into "Amazon's 100 Global Women Leaders Hall of Fame".
