= Wairimu Kiambuthi =

Kenyan academic and film director

Wairimū Kìambūthì
- Born: Kenya
- Education: Teachers College, Columbia University,
- Occupations: Academic and film director
- Employers: Kenyatta University; Columbia University; Bellevue College
- Notable work: Africans and African-Americans in the United States (2006)

Dr. Wairimū Kìambūthì is a Kenyan academic and film director.

== Early life and education ==
Kìambūthì was born in Kenya. In 1999, she wrote her dissertation at Teachers College, Columbia University, titled "Increasing Gender Awareness in Northern Kenya Through a Video Curriculum"

== Career ==
Kìambūthì was formerly a lecturer in Theatre Arts and Film Technology at Kenyatta University in Kenya and a media consultant at Columbia University in New York. Kìambūthì went on to direct the film Africans and African-Americans in the United States, a documentary released in 2006. The film aims to promote understanding between Africans in the United States and was featured at the African Film Festival in New York.

As of 2016, Kìambūthì is an instructor at Bellevue College in Washington.

== Filmography ==
- Africans and African-Americans in the United States (2006)
