= Joyce Mbui =

- Born: 1986 (age 39–40); Kenya
- Citizenship: Kenya
- Education: University of Leicester (Bachelor of Laws); The Nottingham Trent University (Legal Practice Course); University of Reading (Master of Science in Real Estate); Kenya School of Law (Advocates Training Programme)
- Occupation: Lawyer
- Years active: 2003–present
- Title: Partner at Coulson Harney LLP, in Nairobi, Kenya

Joyce Mbui, is a Kenyan lawyer, who is a partner at Coulson Harney LLP, a law firm, based in Nairobi, Kenya's capital city. Coulson Harney LLP is a member of the Bowman Law Firm Network, headquartered in Johannesburg, South Africa, with offices in Cape Town, Dar es Salaam, Durban, Kampala and Nairobi.

Mbui is qualified as an English solicitor of England and Wales as well as an advocate of the High Court of Kenya. She is a member of the Law Society of Kenya and the Law Society of England and Wales.

== Background and education ==
Mbui was born circa 1986, in Kenya. She attended Precious Blood Girls High School in the Riruta neighborhood of Nairobi, where she obtained her high school diploma.

She graduated from the University of Leicester with a Bachelor of Laws degree. She then enrolled in the Legal Practice Course at the Nottingham Trent University. Having passed that course, she was admitted to the English Bar.

She went on to obtain a Master of Science degree in Real Estate, from the University of Reading. Mbui is also a member of the Kenya Bar, having successfully completed the Advocates Training Programme, at the Kenya School of Law.

== Work experience ==
Mbui started out in 2003 as a customer billing representative at British Gas, working in that capacity for two years. In 2009, she returned to Kenya and worked as a legal associate at Kaplan & Stratton, another Nairobi law firm, where she worked until 2011. In 2012, she joined Bowman as an associate attorney, working there for one year, before returning to the United Kingdom for further studies. In 2015, she was promoted to senior associate at Bowman Gilfillan Africa Group and posted to the group's headquarters in Johannesburg, South Africa. In 2018, she was made partner at Bowman and was assigned to the group's office in Nairobi, Kenya (Coulson Harney LLP).

Mbui's expertise is in corporate and commercial law, corporate financing, capital markets and restructuring. She was a member of the legal team that advised Kenya Airways (IATA:KQ) during its re-structuring in 2017. During that process, the government of Kenya and several Kenyan commercial banks converted several hundred million dollars' worth of loans into equity, to allow KQ to continue operating as a going concern.

== Other considerations ==
In September 2018, Mbui was named among the "Top 40 Women Under 40 in Kenya 2018" by the Business Daily Africa, an English language Kenyan daily newspaper.
