= Wangui =

Wangui is a middle name of Kikuyu origin. Notable people with the surname include:

- Lucy Wangui Kabuu (born 1984), Kenyan long-distance runner
- Rose Wangui, Kenyan journalist
- Pascaline Wangui (born 1960), Kenyan marathon runner
