= Architectural Association of Kenya =

Kenyan professional organization

The Architectural Association of Kenya (AAK) is a corporate body for professionals in the built and natural environments in Kenya. It draws its membership from eight major disciplines:

- Architects (Arch.)
- Quantity Surveyors (QS)
- Town Planners (Plan.)
- Engineers (Eng.)
- Landscape Architects (LArch.)
- Construction Project Managers (CPM)
- Environmental Design Consultants (EDC)
- Interior Designers (ID)

Landscape architecture is a new practice in Kenya, first inaugurated in Jomo Kenyatta University of Agriculture and Technology. It deals with design of open spaces ranging from residential to public space. It entails design of plazas (foyers, street plazas, mixed and pedestrian malls), squares, parks (neighbourhood, mini, public parks), golf courses, town aesthetics.

== AAK Co-operative Sacco Ltd ==
Licensed under the Ministry of Industry, Trade and Cooperatives, AAK Co-operative Sacco Ltd (The Architectural Association of Kenya Co-operative Savings and Credit Society Limited) (also dubbed The Built Environment Sacco) is the premier Sacco serving professionals in the built environment industry. They include architects, quantity surveyors, engineers, town planners, environmental design consultants, landscape architects, and construction project managers. Membership to the Sacco is also open to immediate family members of the said professionals and staff of firm members of AAK and affiliated associations. The Sacco undertakes Back Office Savings Activity (BOSA) activities for its members.
