= Laila Macharia =

Kenyan lawyer, entrepreneur and angel investor

- Born: 1970 (age 55–56)
- Education: University of Oregon; Cornell Law School; Stanford Law School; Stanford University Graduate School of Business; Yale University; Paris 1 Panthéon-Sorbonne University
- Title: Chairperson, Africa Leadership Initiative (East Africa)

Laila Macharia is a Kenyan lawyer, businesswoman, entrepreneur and angel investor based in Nairobi, Kenya's capital city. She sits on the boards of a number of national, regional and international enterprises, including (a) Africa Digital Media Group (b) Absa Bank Kenya Plc and (c) Centum Investments.

== Biography ==
Macharia was born in Nairobi, Kenya and grew up in Kenya, Somalia and Namibia. At the age of 18, she relocated alone to the United States where she lived and worked until her return to East Africa in 2003.

Between 2007 and 2014, Macharia was the Founder CEO of Scion Real, an investment firm focused on urban development in Africa. The firm provides investment solutions for institutional investors and multinational corporations expanding into and within Africa. Headquartered in Nairobi, Kenya, Scion Real provided transaction advice to the governments of Guinea, Kenya, Rwanda and South Sudan in the area of public-private partnerships for housing and urban infrastructure. For private projects, Scion Real raised funding commitments of more than US$30 million. In 2013, Scion Real was appointed to structure investor opportunities for Konza Technology City and also worked on the World Bank project identifying private sector investment for commuter rail stations under Nairobi Metro 2030.

Prior to establishing Scion Real, Macharia managed a number of portfolios and transactions for organizations in Africa and the United States. Her experience includes work at the New York office of Clifford Chance as a corporate associate. There, she coordinated a US$5 billion multi-currency bond financing program and supported a similar US$4 billion program issuing securities on the New York, Luxembourg and Tokyo Stock Exchanges. Macharia also managed an Africa-wide funding portfolio at the Global Fund for Women in Palo Alto, California.

In 2013, Macharia joined the Board of Directors of Centum Investment Company Limited, the largest listed private equity firm in East Africa with holdings across several sectors including health, education, renewable energy, financial services, real estate and fast-moving consumer goods. In July 2021, she was appointed Vice Chairperson.

Until her resignation in August 2016, Macharia was the elected Vice Chairman of the Kenya Private Sector Alliance (KEPSA). KEPSA is the sub-region's largest business lobby, an umbrella federation including the Federation of Kenyan Employers, the Kenya Bankers Association and the Kenya Association of Manufacturers. In her rise to Vice Chair, Macharia worked for a decade within the larger KEPSA framework, supporting market development and progressive sector reform alongside stakeholders from various industries, counties and nationalities.

== Education ==
Macharia holds a doctorate in law (J.S.D) from Stanford Law School. Her dissertation focused on telecommunications sector reform in Kenya. In 1995, Macharia earned a Bachelor of Laws (J.D.) and Master of Laws (LL.M) from Cornell Law School in Ithaca, New York. She also holds a Bachelor of Arts (B.A.) in Planning and Public Policy from the University of Oregon. Macharia has been admitted to the bars of Maryland (1996) and New York State (2002). She is also an Advocate of High Court of Kenya (2006).

== Academia ==
In 2004 and 2005, Macharia taught business law to undergraduate and graduate students at the United States International University in Nairobi. In 2009, she created the Real Estate Executive Program at the Strathmore Business School. She teaches periodically at the Woodrow Wilson School of Public and International Affairs at Princeton University.

Macharia has authored several publications. Her academic inquiries focus on the sociology of law, with a particular interest in market, regulatory and constitutional reform. Her current research focuses on how formal law and policy is negotiated in real life and how legal culture evolves, especially as societies modernize.

=== Publications ===
- Models of Election Commissions in Africa (International Foundation for Election Systems, 1995)
- PhD Dissertation: Informal Institutions and Telecommunications Reform in Kenya (2007)
- "Voice and Reflexivity in Essential Resources: Reforming the Community Land Regime in Kenya" in Governing Access to Essential Resources (Columbia University Press, 2015).

== Awards ==
- Fellow, Aspen Institute's Africa Leadership Initiative (ALI), 2010
- Top 100 Kenyans, 2021
