= Elani (band) =

Kenyan band

- Origin: Nairobi, Kenya
- Genres: African pop; contemporary R&B; soul; neo soul
- Years active: 2011–present
- Label: Record Union
- Members: Wambui Ngugi; Maureen Kunga; Brian Chweya

Elani is a Kenyan African pop group from Nairobi. It consists of three members; Wambūi Ngūgì, Brian Chweya and Maureen Kunga. The trio released their debut single"Jana Usiku" in November 2013 that became a great success, paving way for their subsequent singles. In 2014, the trio released numerous singles in the making of their debut album Barua ya Dunia.

== History ==
=== 2008–12; Band maturity ===
Elani met in January 2008 at Alliance Française in Nairobi. It originally consisted of four members; Wambūi Ngūgì, Maureen Kunga, Brian Chweya and Daniel Kìmani. Kìmani's departure has never been explained. They became more serious between 2010 and 2011 when they mutually decided to take their careers to the next level.

=== 2013–Present; Barua ya Dunia ===
In 2013, the band released their debut single "Jana Usiku" In March 2014, Elani released their second single "Milele", the song talks about two lovers who live a forbidden passion, thereby the lady's family tries hard to marry her off to a doctor. The video was shot by Sauti Sol's Savara Mudigi in conjunction with Sol Music Entertainment and directed by Enos Olik. In mid 2014, the trio released "Kookoo", a song that was shot in the streets of Nairobi, and is the most successful production the band ever released since it was the most downloaded song in the downloading platforms. As of 16 July 2014, "Kookoo" was ranked second in the respective week's chart just coming right after Bahati's "Barua". The band has also released "hatua", "Zuzu", "Uko Wapi", "Barua ya Dunia" and "Mahindi. In 2016, the band featured Chameleone in their new single "My Darling".

== Controversies ==
On 12 January 2016, Elani released a statement through their YouTube channel and their other social media platforms, accusing the Music Copyright Society of Kenya(MCSK) of corruption over music royalty disparity. Having paid them KES 31,000 for their royalties for television and radio air play. They later stated, that after addressing their complaints to the relevant authorities of the society, Brian, one of the band members was called by the society's offices and paid a compensatory KES 300,000, making the motive behind the two payments questionable. MCSK later defended itself stating that all said by the band is not entirely true but accepted the fact that the band was paid peanuts but they (MCSK) later discovered a mistake on their (MCSK) part where they failed to monitor the band's songs for the period dated July 2013 to June 2014. Adding that KES 300,000 was compensation for the royalties lost within that period for which their song received massive airplay finalizing that that is a common mistake that happens not only to Elani but also other musicians.

== Band members ==
Current members

- Wambūi Ngūgì – Vocals (2008 –present)
- Maureen Kunga – Vocals (2008 –present)
- Brian Chweya – Vocalist, guitarist (2008 –present)

Previous members

- Daniel Kimani

== Personal Lives ==
=== Maureen Kunga ===
Kunga is a law school graduate (University of Nairobi)

=== Wambūi Ngūgì ===
Ngugi is an Actuarial Science graduate (University of Nairobi).

=== Brian Chweya ===
Chweya is a law school graduate (University of Nairobi) and an Advocate of the High Court of Kenya.

== Discography ==
=== Studio albums ===
Barua ya Dunia

Title
Barua ya Dunia
Cover
Album details
- Released: December 2013
- Label: Record Union
- Format: CD, digital download
Notes

No.	Title	Length
1.	"Jana Usiku"	3:52
2.	"Milele"	3:23
3.	"Kookoo"	4:15
4.	"Hatua"	3:55
5.	"Zuzu"	3:48
6.	"Uko Wapi"	3:52
7.	Untitled	5:20
8.	"Peperuka"	3:58
9.	"Barua ya Dunia"	4:14
10.	"Hapo Zamani"	4:25
11.	"Mahindi"	4:14
12.	"Kookoo" (Reggae remix)	4:16
13.	"Zuzu" (featuring DJ Joe Mfalme)	3:48

=== Singles ===
Year	Single	Director	Album	Ref(s)
2013	"Jana Usiku"	Steve Muriungi	Barua ya Dunia	
2014	"Milele"		Barua ya Dunia	
2014	"Kookoo"	Ogopa Videos	Barua ya Dunia	
2014	"Mahindi"		Barua ya Dunia	
2014	"Hapo Zamani"		Barua ya Dunia	
2014	"Hatua"		Barua ya Dunia	
2014	"Zuzu"		Barua ya Dunia	
2014	"Peperuka"		Barua ya Dunia	
2014	"Uko wapi"		Barua ya Dunia	
2014	"Barua ya Dunia"		Barua ya Dunia	
2015	"Nikupende"			
2016	"My Darling" (Elani featuring Chameleone)			
2018	"Heartbeat"	Ogopa Videos		

== Awards and nominations ==
Year	Association	Award category	Nominated work	Result	Ref
2014	Channel O Music Video Awards	Most Gifted - East	"Kookoo"	Nominated	
2014	All Africa Music Awards (AFRIMA)	Best African Pop	"Kookoo"	Won	
