= Flora Mutahi =

Kenyan businessperson

- Born: Kenya
- Education: University of Cape Town
- Occupations: Accountant, Business executive, Entrepreneur
- Years active: 1996 - present

Flora Mutahi is a Kenyan businessperson with experience in strategic leadership, business development and marketing.

== Education ==
Mutahi was born in Kenya and attended local schools for her primary and secondary education. She holds a B.Sc. Finance and accounts (UK), and an Executive Master of Business Administration, awarded by the University of Cape Town in South Africa.

== Career ==
Mutahi is the founder and CEO of Melvin Marsh International Ltd, a company that introduced flavored teas in Kenya. Melvins has received the Top 100, Fire awards for Financial reporting, and the Most Promising Entrepreneur.

In 2011 Mutahi founded a real estate company named Azizi Realtors. She also launched the Melvins Mentorship Impact Programme to provide coaching to female entrepreneurs.

In July 2016, Mutahi was appointed chairperson of the Kenya Association of Manufacturers, the first woman to occupy that office. In November 2017, she was elected vice-chairperson of the business council of the Common Market of Eastern and Southern Africa.

In June 2018, it was announced that she had been appointed to the Board of the UN Global Compact.

In May 2021 she became the first female Chairperson of Kenya Private Sector Alliance (KEPSA); she is also a board member of SBM Bank Kenya.

== Personal life ==
Mutahi is a married mother of three children.
