= Alliance Girls High School =

Alliance Girls' High School
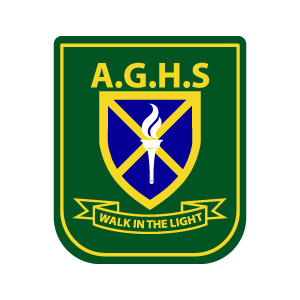

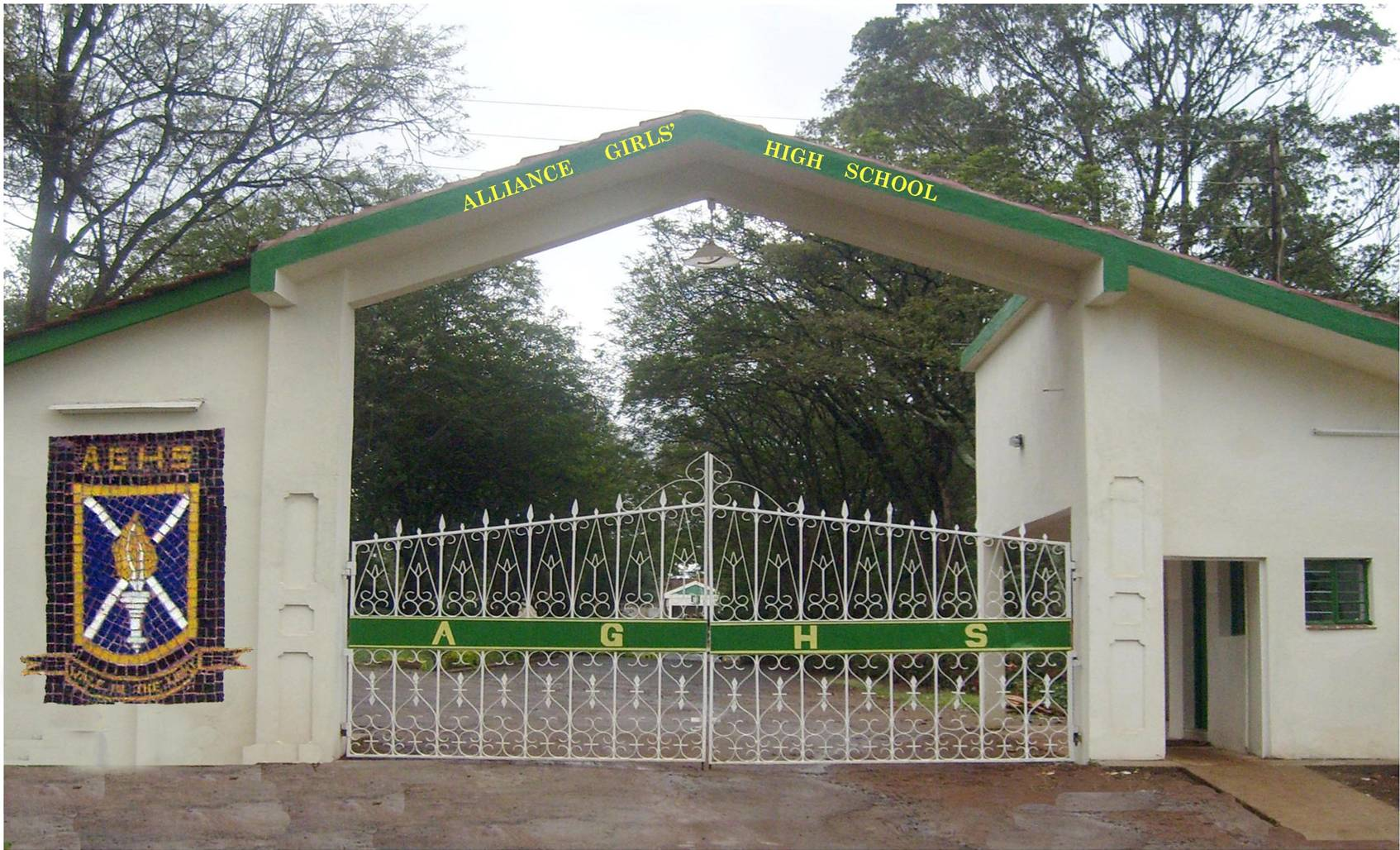
- Main gate of the school

Location
- Kikuyu, Kiambu County; Kenya; 1°15′59″S 36°39′46″E

Information
- Other name: Bush Gee, Across, AGHS
- Former name: African Girls' High School
- Type: Public national boarding school
- Motto: Walk in the light
- Established: 1948; 78 years ago
- Founder: Alliance of Protestant Missions
- Sister school: Alliance High School
- Principal: Jedidah Mwangi
- Gender: Girls
- Colours: Green and white
- Website: aghs.sc.ke

Alliance Girls' High School (AGHS) is a public national boarding school for girls located near the small town of Kikuyu in Kiambu County, 20 km from Nairobi. Founded in 1948 by Alliance of Protestant Missions, it is within walking distance from its brother school Alliance High School.

== History ==
Founded in 1948 by the Alliance of Protestant Missions, Alliance Girls' High School was the first institution of higher secondary education for African girls in Kenya, and served in parallel with The Kenya High School which at that time only admitted European girls. Before Kenyan independence it was called African Girls High School. Alliance Girls High School sits on 71 acres of land in Kiambu County, originally donated by the Presbyterian Church of East Africa.

The school's first principal, Jean Wilkinson (née Ewan), was a Scottish missionary. Joan Waithaka, one of the first students to graduate from the school, became its first African principal in 1969. She also served on the 1976 Gachathi Report committee which recommended that the Kenyan government adopt policies which would increase women's participation not only in higher education but also in science and other male-dominated spheres in the country.

The first 10 girls admitted to the school arrived on February 28, 1948 and came from all the different provinces in Kenya as is still the case today. In 1961, Alliance Girls High School was one of the first five schools in Africa to offer the High School Certificate (at the time, the equivalent of A Levels and a requirement for university entrance). Prior to the establishment of Alliance Girls High School, a few girls had been admitted to the predominantly male Alliance High School. One of the last girls to graduate from there was the writer Rebeka Njau who later taught at the Alliance Girls High School. The two schools continue to maintain close relations.

In 2025, the school became the subject of a nationwide controversy amid allegations of sexual abuse against a male teacher at the school. A group of alumnus from the school said they plan to sue the school's management, alleging that sexual abuses at the school had been systematically covered up since 2011 to shield the school's reputation.

=== Principals ===
- Jean Wilkinson, 1948–54
- Mary Bruce, 1955–1968
- Joan Waithaka, 1969–1984
- Rebecca Karanja, 1985–2002
- V. M. Kituri, 2003–2004
- J. N. Mbugua 2004–2008
- Dorothy Kamwilu 2008–2016
- Catherine K. Irungu (H.S.C) 2017
- Virginia Gitonga 2017–2022
- Mrs Jedidah Mwangi - 2023–2025
- Mrs Margaret Njeru 2025(current)

== Academic reputation ==
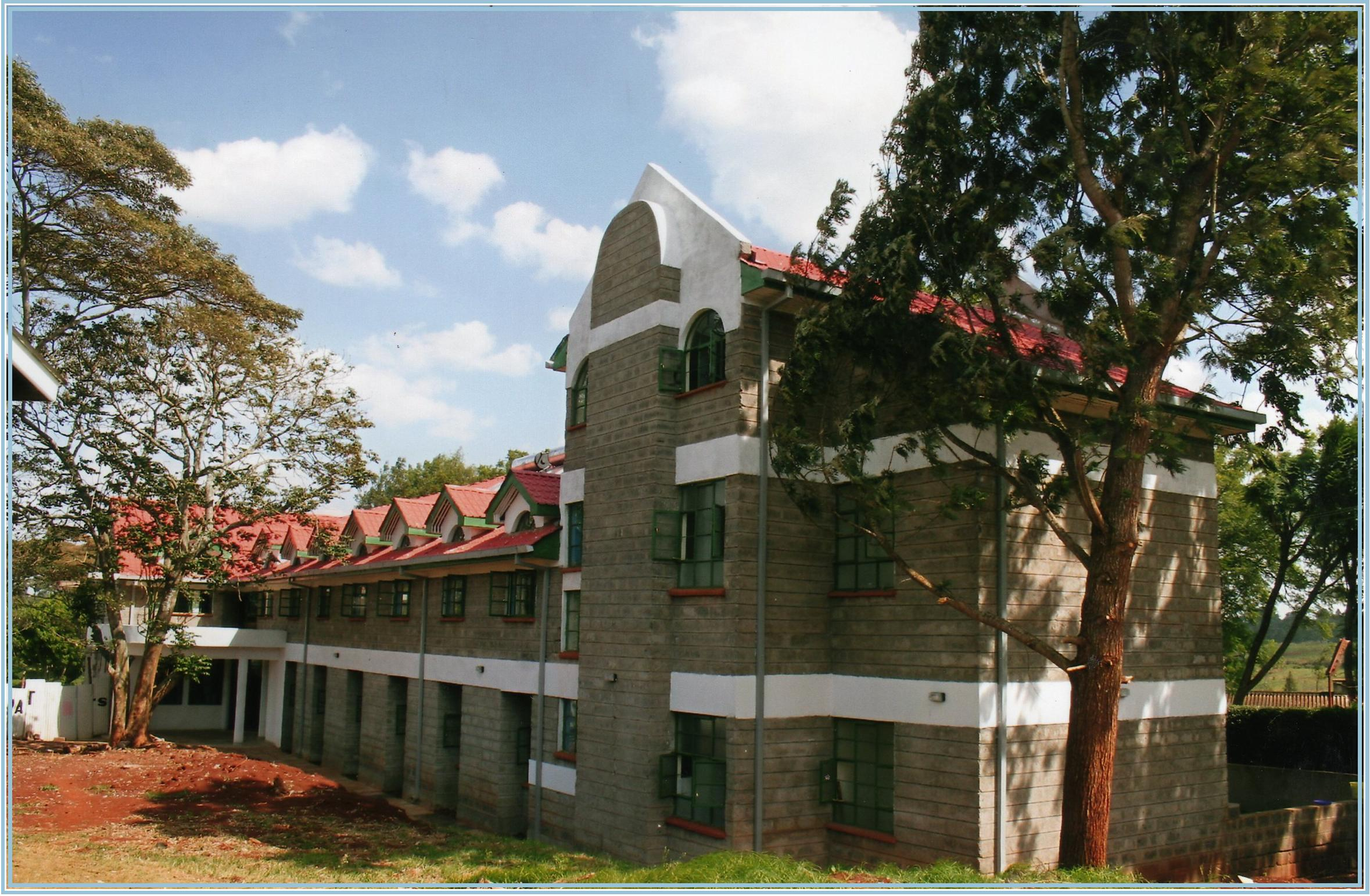
New House, one of the school's ten dormitories

The school has a reputation as a center of academic excellence in Kenya. It held first place amongst girls' schools in Kenya in the 2011 KCSE results and was in third place out of all Kenyan secondary schools.

== Admission ==
Admission is highly competitive. Only students with a very high performance on the Kenya Certificate of Primary Education are selected to attend. The school also participates in the national quota system that sees a balance in admission of students from all Kenyan Districts. In 2015, Alliance Girls High School attracted the highest number of applicants out of all the national schools with 156,347 applications, followed by the Alliance High School with 154,417 and Mangu High School with 148,594.

== School crest and colours ==
The school's crest is composed of a white torch yellow flame superimposed over St. Andrew's Cross on a green background. The initials AGHS are above the crest, while the school motto "Walk in the light" is beneath it, both written in yellow. According to the school's website, the colour yellow represents the light of the torch, the green depicts the life given by the light, and white signifies the product of this life. The school uniform is green reflecting the constant growth of the school.

For a few years, the school uniform was maroon in colour. This was phased out, beginning in the year 2005 with the form one class joining the school that year.

== Chapel ==
The school chapel, one of the landmarks of the school, is located opposite the Administration block. It is used for services on Sunday, Tuesday and Thursday attended by all students. It is also where the school Barazas (student parliament and meetings) are held. The school chaplain is Reverend Angela Wamuyu who succeeded Reverend Dorcas Kamau in 2019.

== Notable alumnae ==
- Betty Gikonyo, medical entrepreneur, pediatric cardiologist and healthcare professional
- Lucy Kibaki, former First Lady of Kenya
- Sally Kosgei, first woman head of the Kenyan civil service
- Micere Mugo, poet, writer and educator
- Juliet Obanda Makanga, pharmacologist, neuroscientist and medical researcher
- Nyiva Mwendwa, Kenya's first woman cabinet minister
- Charity Ngilu, Kenya's first woman presidential candidate
- Asenath Bole Odaga, publisher and author
- Margaret Ogola, novelist and pediatrician
- Effie Owuor, Kenya's first female judge
- Kagure Wamunyu, civil engineer and urban planner
- Charity Wayua, chemist and researcher
- Wangari wa Nyatetu-Waigwa, alumni, staff member and US college professor
