= Wanjiku =

Wanjikũ is a feminine Kikuyu name. Historically, Wanjikũ was one of the nine daughters of the man and wife who founded the Agĩkũyũ people, Gĩkũyũ and Mũmbi. Consequently, the descendants of her lineage form the Agacikũ Clan of the Agĩkũyũ tribe in Kenya.

== People with the given name ==
- Wanjiku Kabira (born 1948), professor of literature
- Wanjiku Mugane, attorney and investment banker
- Wanjiku Muhia, Kenyan politician
- Wanjiku the Teacher, Kenyan comedian, actress and producer
- Wanjiku wa Ngũgĩ (born 1970s), Kenyan writer

== People with the surname ==
- Beatrice Wanjiku, Kenyan artist
- Mercy Wanjiku (born 1986), Kenyan long-distance runner
- Teresa Wanjiku (born 1974), Kenyan long-distance runner
