= Jomo Kenyatta University of Agriculture and Technology =

Public university in Juja, Kenya

- Other name: JKUAT
- Former names: Jomo Kenyatta University College of Agriculture and Technology.
- Motto: Setting trends in higher education, research and innovation.
- Type: Public
- Established: 1994; 32 years ago
- Chairman: Ambassador (Eng.) Mahboub M. Maalim
- Chancellor: Prof. Joseph Mathu Ndung'u
- President: Brian Mutevu
- Vice-president: Yyvone Nyambura
- Vice-Chancellor: Prof. Victoria Ngumi
- Dean: Dr. Rev. Wakaba
- Total staff: 3,000
- Students: 50,000
- Location: Juja, Kiambu County, Central Kenya, Kenya; 01°05′25″S 37°00′31″E
- Campus: 494 acres (200 ha); Main Campus (Juja) Westlands Campus – near Kianda School (Nairobi) Karen Campus(Nairobi, Karen, Kenya Kigali Campus (Kigali, Kigali, Rwanda)
- Colours: Blue and Green
- Website: www.jkuat.ac.ke

Jomo Kenyatta University of Agriculture and Technology (JKUAT) is a public university in Kenya that is situated in Juja, 36 kilometres (22 mi) north-east of Nairobi, along the Nairobi-Thika SuperHighway, off Exit 15. It offers courses in technology, engineering, medicine, science, commerce, management and building sciences and holds a strong research interest in the areas of biotechnology and engineering. Notable alumni include Dr. Julius Ojwang, the Chief Medical Physicist at Mercy Cancer Center in Iowa, USA. During his studies in JKUAT, Dr. Ojwang served as the Editor-in-Chief of CampusView (a JKUAT's Students magazine); Dr. Paul Chepkwony, the first governor of Kericho County in Kenya and a former lecturer, Emma Miloyo, a prominent Kenyan architect and the first female president of the Architectural Association of Kenya, as well as Aden Duale, the former leader of majority in the 11th Kenyan Parliament among others. As of 2023, the vice chancellor of the university was Prof. Victoria Ngumi.

== History ==
The university was started in 1981 as Jomo Kenyatta College of Agriculture and Technology (JKCAT), a middle-level college by the government of Kenya with assistance from the Japanese government. Plans for the establishment of JKCAT started in 1977. In early 1978, the Kenyan president, Jomo Kenyatta, donated 200 hectares of farmland for the establishment of the college. The first group of students were admitted on 4 May 1981. The new president Daniel Arap Moi formally opened JKUAT on 17 March 1982.

The first graduation ceremony was held in April 1984 with diploma certificates presented to graduates in agricultural engineering, food technology and horticulture. On 1 September 1988, Moi declared JKUAT a constituent College of Kenyatta University through a legal notice, under the Kenyatta University Act (CAP 210C). The name of JKUAT officially changed to Jomo Kenyatta University College of Agriculture and Technology (JKUCAT). It was finally established as a university through the JKUAT Act, 1994 and inaugurated on 7 December 1994 with Prof. Ratemo Michieka as the founding Vice Chancellor, and Prof. Henry Thairu as the Deputy Vice Chancellor (Academics).

In June 2019, the university graduated 118 PhDs, of whom 89 were from the College of Human Resource Development. The Commission for University Education said it would investigate allegations that rules on supervisor–student ratios and peer review had been breached.

== Boards, Colleges, Faculties, Institutes, Schools and Campuses ==
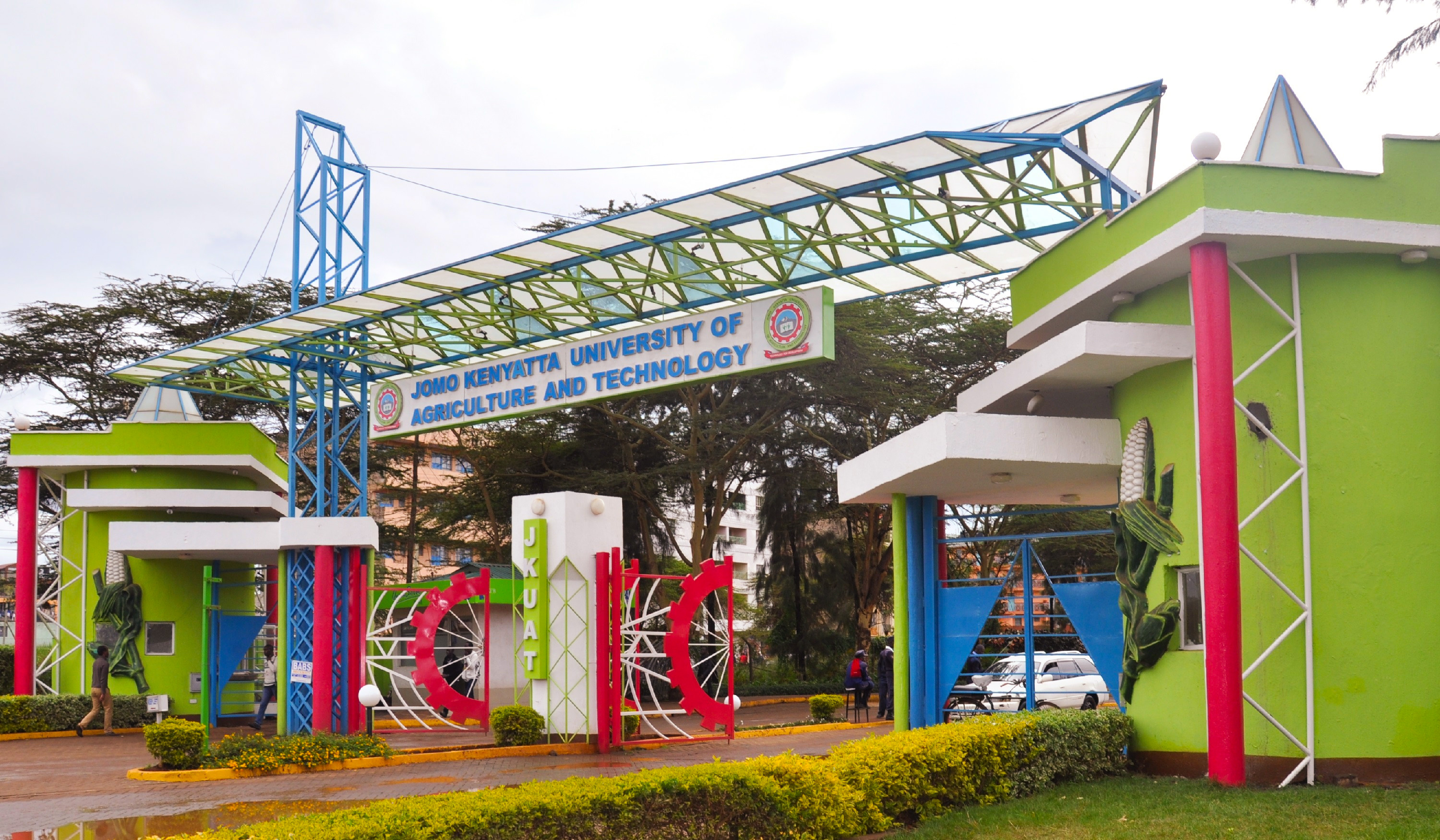
Jomo Kenyatta University of Agriculture and Technology Main Campus Gate A in Juja Town

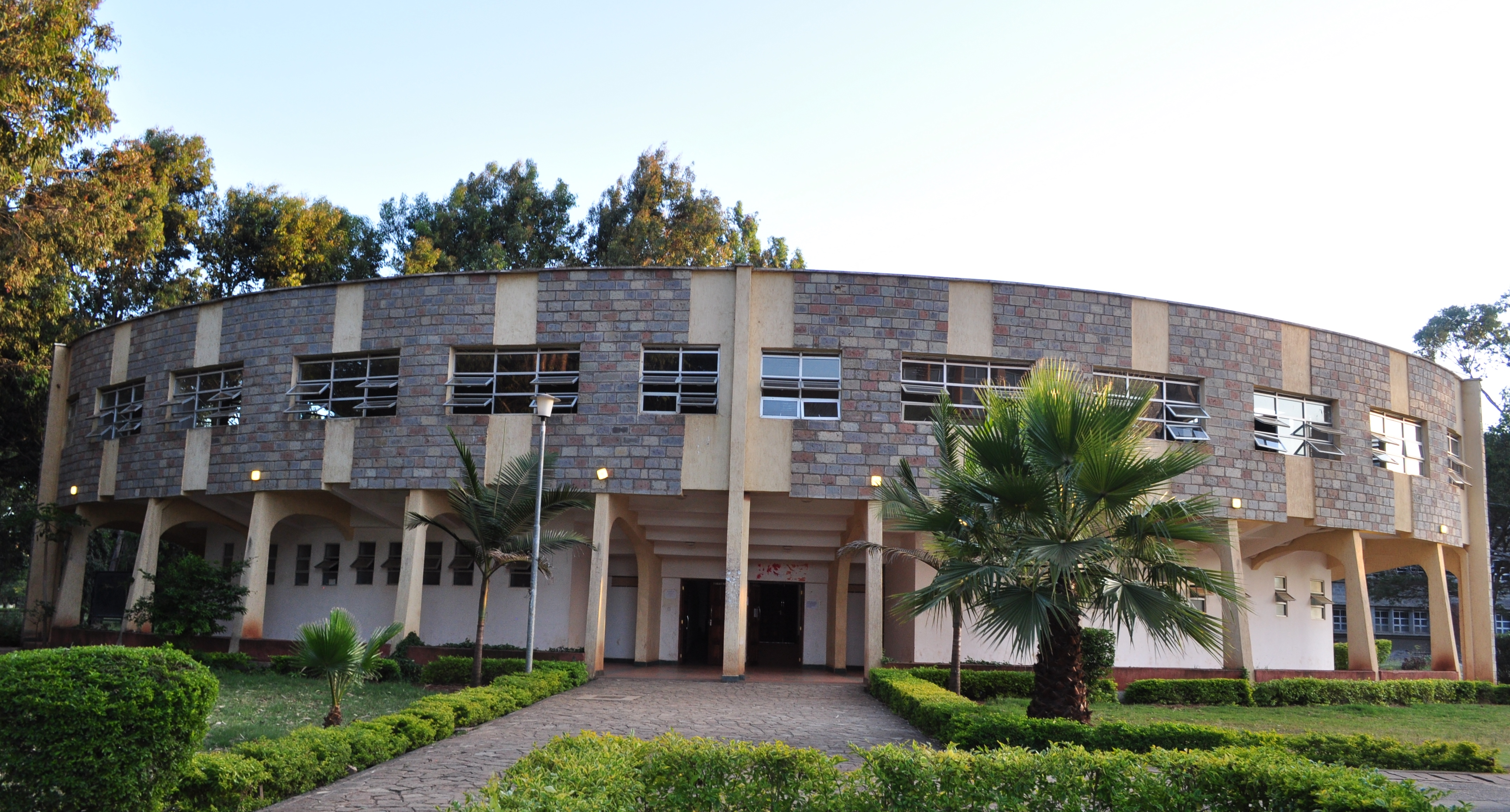
Lecture Theater JKUAT

Jomo Kenyatta has the following campuses, schools, faculties, institutes and colleges:

=== Schools ===
- School of Medicine (Main campus)
- School of Pharmacy (Main campus)
- School of Computing and Information Technology
- School of Architecture & Building Sciences
- School of Civil, Environmental and Geospatial Engineering
- School of Electrical, Electronic and Information Engineering
- School of Law (based at the Karen Campus)
- School of Mechanical, Manufacturing and Materials Engineering
- School of Biosystems and Environmental Engineering (SoBEE) – Main Campus
- School of Business
- School of Communication and Development Studies (SCDS)

School of Biomedical Sciences

- School of Agriculture and Environmental Sciences.(SOAES)
- School of Mathematics and Physical Sciences.

=== Institutes ===
- Institute of Energy & Environment Technology
- Institute for Biotechnology Research

=== Faculties, Campuses, Centres ===
- Board of Postgraduate Studies
- College of Engineering and Technology
- College of Agriculture and Natural Resources
- College of Pure and Applied Sciences
- College of Health Sciences
- College of Human Resource and Development
- Main Campus – Juja
- Karen Campus
- Westlands Campus (formerly Nairobi Campus)
- Kigali Campus – (Kigali, Rwanda)
- Nairobi CBD Centre
- Mombasa CBD Centre
- Nakuru CBD Centre
- Kisii CBD Centre
- Kitale CBD Centre
- Kisumu CBD Centre
- Kakamega CBD Centre
- Eldoret CBD Centre
- Arusha Centre

== Accommodation and catering ==
The university offers accommodation to some of the students at subsidized rates. There are six students' hostels inside the school compound, of which three are occupied by males and three by females. Halls 3, 5, 6 are occupied by males while Halls 1, 2 and 4 are occupied by females.

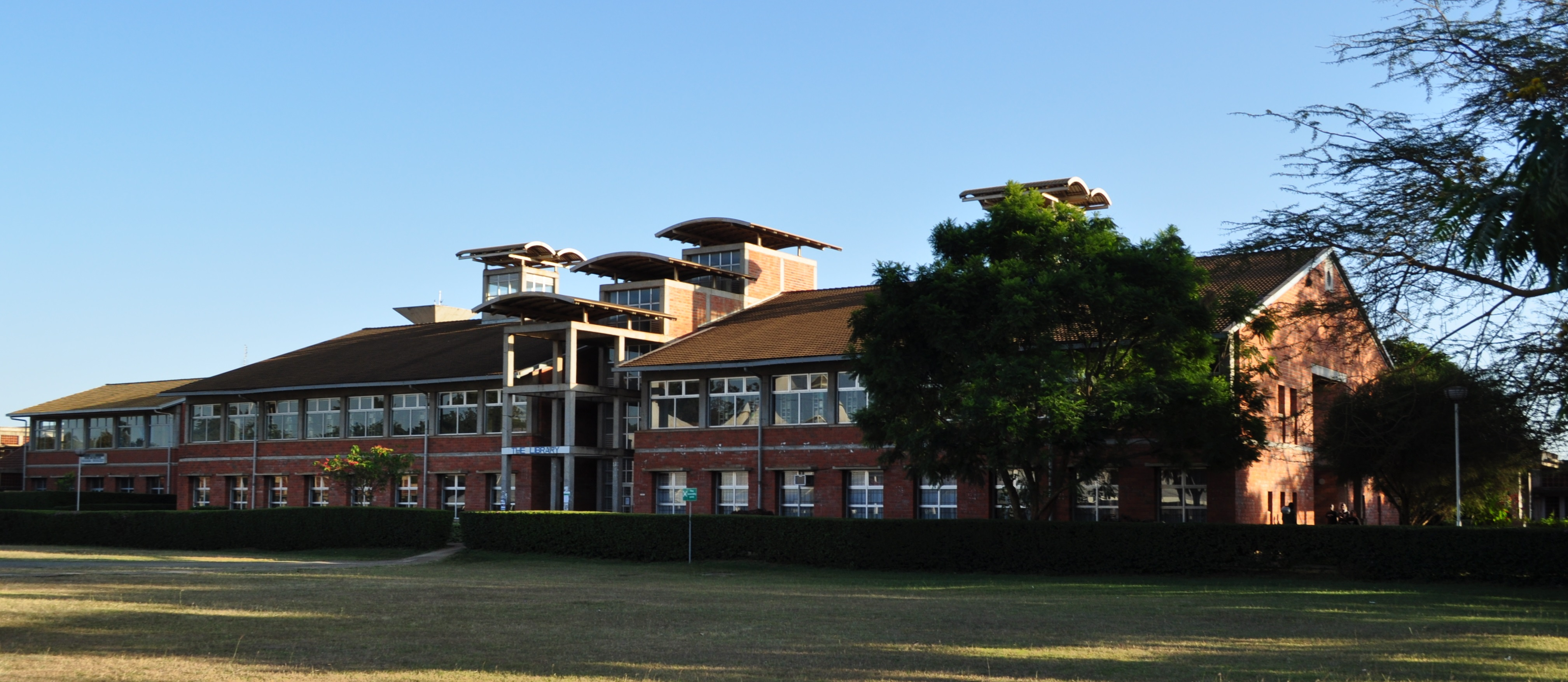
The Jomo Kenya University library.

There are three student dining cafeterias: the Candle in the Wind, Main Mess and the Hall Six dining mess. The food prices are subsidized at the dining mess. Breakfast is served between 6.30-8.00am, Lunch 11am-2pm, Supper 5pm-8pm.

== Library ==
The university has a library that has a seating capacity of 600 students and is stocked with 80,000 volumes. The library also offers other essential services like online services, reference, interlibrary loan, user education, orientation, online information services, photocopying, binding and repair. Some of the books available in the Library includes Season of Vipers by Tuti Danis Odongo.

== Regional institutions ==
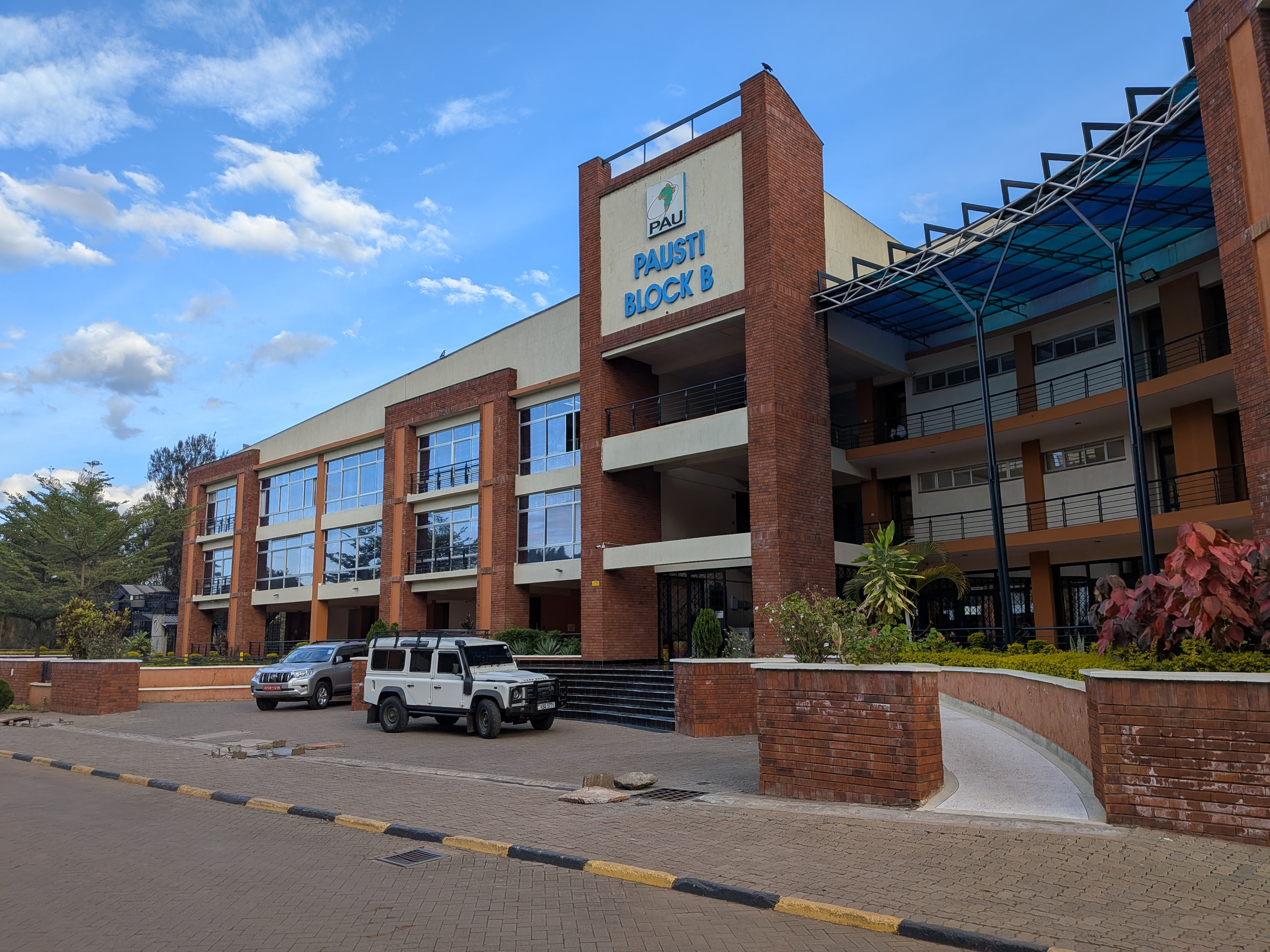
The Pan-African University's Institute on Basic Sciences, Technology and Innovation on the JKUAT campus

In February 2010, JKUAT was selected as the host for the East and Central Africa regional institute of the Pan African University, an initiative by the African Union. The post-graduate Institute on Basic Sciences, Technology and Innovation (PAUSTI) would be hosted at the Main Campus in Juja, with the first students admitted in September 2011. The decision that Kenya would host the regional institute was made in July 2010 after a protracted dispute.

The Chinese government agreed to support the development of infrastructure, classrooms, hostels and laboratories PAUSTI. The agreement was signed on 25 April 2012 between Kenya's Ministry of Higher Education, Science and Technology, represented by Bernard Malenga and JKUAT's vice-chancellor Mabel Imbuga, and an eight-person Chinese delegation led by Yin Youhua.

Since 2000, JKUAT also hosts the African Institute for Capacity Development (AICAD).

== See also ==
- List of universities in Kenya
- Education in Kenya
