= Governor of the Central Bank of Kenya =

The Governor of the Central Bank of Kenya is the chief executive officer of the Central Bank of Kenya. The Governor also serves as a member of the board of directors of the central bank.

The current governor is Dr. Kamau Thugge, who was nominated by president William Ruto on the 15th of May 2023 after a competitive recruitment process carried out by the public service commission. His tenure began on the 19th of June 2023 after vetting by the parliamentary committee on Finance, Trade and Planning and subsequent approval by the parliament of Kenya. He succeeded Dr. Patrick Njoroge, who retired after two terms in the office.

== Governors of the Central Bank of Kenya ==
The following individuals have served as governor since the institution was founded in 1966.

Name	In office
Leon Baranski	1966–1967
Duncan Ndegwa	1967–1982
Philip Ndegwa	1982–1988
Eric Kotut	1988–1993
Micah Cheserem	1993–2001
Nahashon Nyagah	2001–2003
Andrew Mullei	2003–2007
Njuguna Ndung’u	2007–2015
Patrick Ngugi Njoroge	2015–2023
Kamau Thugge	2023–
