= Bank of India (Kenya) =

Commercial bank in Kenya

Bank of India (Kenya) Limited
- Type: Private
- Industry: Financial services
- Founded: 1953
- Headquarters: Bank of India Building; Kenyatta Avenue; Nairobi, Kenya
- Key people: Rajneesh Karnatak, group managing director and CEO; OMPrakash Maheshwari, executive director and CEO
- Products: Loans, Transaction accounts, Savings, Investments, Debit Cards
- Total assets: US$541 million (KES:91 billion (30.09.2024)
- Website: www.boikenya.com

Bank of India (Kenya) is a commercial bank in Kenya. It is one of the commercial banks licensed by the Central Bank of Kenya, the national banking regulator.

As of May 2015, Bank of India (Kenya) is a medium-sized financial services provider in Kenya. Its total assets were valued at approximately US$541 million (KES:51 billion).

== History ==
Bank of India (Kenya) received its banking license on 6 May 1953. Its first office opened in Mombasa, the same year. In 1954 it opened its first branch in Nairobi, in the Heritage Building. It plans to increase its footprint to eight branches before 1 July 2015.

== Bank of India Group ==
By virtue of its shareholding, Bank of India (Kenya) is a member of the Bank of India Group, a financial services conglomerate whose shares are listed on the Bombay Stock Exchange. The stock of the Bank of India Group is 65.9 percent owned by the Government of India and is one of the five largest banks in India, with over 4,000 branches (30 of them outside India) and over 1,650 automated teller machines. The member companies of the Bank of India Groupo include, but are not limited to, the following:

- Bank of India - India
- Bank of India (Botswana)
- Bank of India (Kenya)
- Bank of India (Tanzania)
- Bank of India (Uganda)
- Indo-Zambia Bank Limited - Zambia - 20% shareholding
- Bank of India (South Africa) - representative office

== Branches ==
Bank of India (Kenya) maintains branches at the following locations:

1. Kenyatta Avenue Branch - Bank of India Building, Kenyatta Avenue, Nairobi (Main Branch)
2. Industrial Area Branch - Unit 1D, Block D, Sameer Industrial Park, Nairobi-Mombasa Road, Nairobi
3. Mombasa Branch - Bank of India Building, Nkrumah Road, Mombasa
4. Westlands Branch - The Oval, Westlands, Nairobi
5. Eldoret Branch - Tarita Centre, Ronald Ngala Street, Eldoret

== See also ==
- List of banks in Kenya
- Economy of Kenya
