= Choice Microfinance Bank =

Kenyan microfinance bank

Coordinates: 01°23′51.6″S 36°45′28″E

- Company type: Private
- Industry: Financial services
- Founded: 13 May 2015; 11 years ago
- Headquarters: Siron Place, Magadi Road, Ongata Rongai, Kenya
- Key people: MIB Africa (chairman)
- Products: Loans, savings, forex investments, debit cards
- Revenue: ▲: Aftertax
- Website: Homepage

Choice Microfinance Bank, whose full name is Choice Microfinance Bank Kenya Limited or CMBKL, is a deposit-taking microfinance bank in Kenya, licensed by the Central Bank of Kenya, the national banking regulator.

== Location ==
The headquarters and main office of CMBKL are located at Siron Place, along Magadi Road, in Ongata Rongai, approximately 21 kilometres (13 mi), by road, south-west of the city of Nairobi, Kenya's capital city. The geographical coordinates of the headquarters of the microfinance bank are: 01°23'51.6"S, 36°45'28.0"E (Latitude:-1.397667; Longitude:36.757778).

== Overview ==
CMBKL is a private financial services provider in Kenya. It was awarded a microfinance banking license by the Central Bank of Kenya, on 13 May 2015. The institution was licensed as a community-microfinance bank, authorized to provide services in Kajiado North Constituency in Kajiado County. As of June 2017, the institution was in the process of raising fresh capital, in order to qualify for a national licence that authorizes the company to conduct business in all the counties of the country. A regional microfinance company requires KSh20 million (US$200,000) in capital to obtain a licence, while a national microfinance bank requires a minimum capital investment of KSh60 million (US$600,000). In May 2017, the institution announced its intention to introduce internet banking and mobile banking services.

== Ownership ==
The institution is majority owned by Kenyans in the Diaspora, especially the United States, the United Kingdom, Germany, China and South Africa.

== Branches ==
As of March 2018, the microfinance bank has one branch at Siron Place, along Magadi Road, in Ongata Rongai, Kajiado North Constituency, in Kajiado County, Kenya.

== See also ==
- List of banks in Kenya
- Microfinance in Kenya
