= Garissa =

Garissa Gaarrisa
- Town
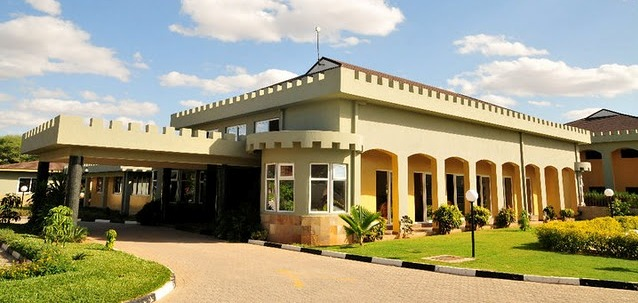
- The Almond Resort in Garissa.

- Location within Kenya Location within the Horn of Africa Location within Africa
- Coordinates: 0°27′25″S 39°39′30″E
- Country: Kenya
- County: Garissa County

Population (2019)
  - Total: 163,399
- Time zone: UTC+3 (EAT)

Garissa (Somali: Gaarrisa Arabic: قارسا) is a town in northeastern region of Kenya located along the Tana River, in the border between Garissa County and Tana River County. It is the capital of Garissa County snd serves as an administrative and commercial centre for the surrounding region. According to the 2019 Kenya Population and Housing Census, the town had a population of 163,399 making it the 12th largest urban center in Kenya.

== Geography ==
The Tana River, which rises in Mount Kenya east of Nyeri, flows through Garissa. The Bour-Algi Giraffe Sanctuary, situated 5 km south of Garissa, is home to endangered wildlife including the Rothschild giraffe, gerenuk and other herbivores including Kirk's dik-dik, lesser kudu, warthog and waterbuck.

== Demographics ==
Most of Garissa's inhabitants are ethnic Somali from the Ogaden clan.

== Economy ==
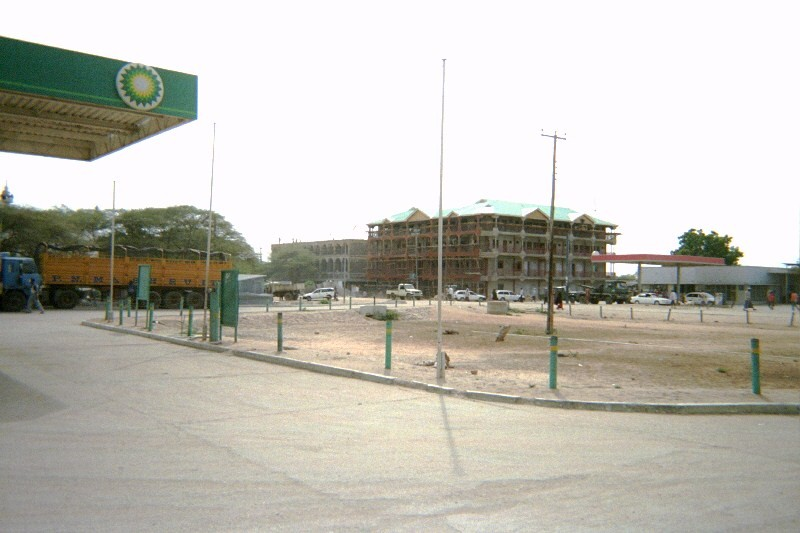
A BP petrol station in downtown Garissa.

Garissa is a market centre and the commercial hub of the Garissa County. The town has a university, Garissa University College and a number of colleges including Medical College. In December 2019, the Garissa Solar Power Station was inaugurated, providing grid power to Garissa town.

Banks with a presence in Garissa include the Gulf African Bank situated in the Al-Wayf Quran House, the Postbank in the Garissa Shopping Centre, and the First Community Bank (FCB) in the Bajwed Building. Other banks with branches in the city include Absa Bank, Equity Bank, Kenya Commercial Bank, National Bank of Kenya, Chase Bank and Cooperative Bank of Kenya.

Livestock rearing is a significant part of the town's economy. Between 2005 and 2007, Garissa cattle farmers earned over KES1.8 billion in sales in domestic and overseas markets. Construction of a new abattoir also began in October 2007. In terms of livestock imports, most of Garissa's cattle comes from cross-border trade between Somali livestock merchants.

== 2015 terrorist attack ==
On 2 April 2015, gunmen stormed the Garissa University College, killing 147 people and injuring at least 79. The militant group and Al-Qaeda offshoot, Al-Shabaab claimed responsibility for the attack. The gunmen took over 700 students hostage, freeing Muslims and killing those who identified as Christians. The siege ended the same day when all four of the attackers were killed. Five men were later arrested in connection with the attack, and a bounty was placed for the arrest of a suspected organizer, Mohamed Mahmoud, also known as Dulyadeyn. Dulyadeyn was later killed by U.S.-trained Somali commandos from the Somali National Army on the night of May 31, 2016, in Bulo Gadud, a town loyal to Al-Shabaab, about 30 kilometers north of the port of Kismayo in Somalia.

The Garissa University attack was the second deadliest terrorist attack in Kenyan history since independence (after the 1998 United States embassy bombings in Nairobi, in which 213 people were killed).

== Governance ==
As the capital of Garissa County, Garissa is the seat of the County Government of Garissa as well as the County Assembly. The Governor of the county is Nathif Jama. The city is represented by Mohamed Dekow Barow, a Somali Member of Parliament for the Garissa Township Constituency in the National Assembly of Kenya. He was elected to the position in the Kenya National Assembly through the UDA Party. During the colonial era, Garissa, as well as other parts of NFD, were collectively conferred to as the British East Africa province of Trans-juba, and would subsequently be referred to as Jubaland, which split into two in the mid 1920s.

== Climate ==
Garissa has a hot arid climate (Köppen climate classification BWh), despite receiving around 375 millimetres or 15 inches of rainfall per year, due to the extremely high potential evapotranspiration. Garissa's landscape is mostly arid, desert terrain. The city lies along the Tana River, and has a hot climate due to the low elevation and distance from cooler coastal areas. The daytime temperature typically rises above 33 °C or 91.4 °F every day, but cools down every night.

Climate data for Garissa (1991–2020, extremes 1931–present)
Month	Jan	Feb	Mar	Apr	May	Jun	Jul	Aug	Sep	Oct	Nov	Dec	Year
Record high °C (°F)	43.2 (109.8)	41.0 (105.8)	40.0 (104.0)	40.0 (104.0)	38.2 (100.8)	36.5 (97.7)	37.5 (99.5)	37.7 (99.9)	39.0 (102.2)	39.0 (102.2)	38.4 (101.1)	38.1 (100.6)	43.2 (109.8)
Mean daily maximum °C (°F)	35.5 (95.9)	36.7 (98.1)	37.0 (98.6)	35.9 (96.6)	34.5 (94.1)	33.1 (91.6)	32.3 (90.1)	32.6 (90.7)	33.8 (92.8)	35.0 (95.0)	34.3 (93.7)	34.3 (93.7)	34.6 (94.2)
Daily mean °C (°F)	29.5 (85.1)	30.3 (86.5)	30.9 (87.6)	30.4 (86.7)	29.2 (84.6)	28.0 (82.4)	27.0 (80.6)	27.2 (81.0)	28.0 (82.4)	29.2 (84.6)	29.1 (84.4)	29.0 (84.2)	29.0 (84.2)
Mean daily minimum °C (°F)	23.3 (73.9)	23.9 (75.0)	24.9 (76.8)	24.9 (76.8)	23.8 (74.8)	22.5 (72.5)	21.6 (70.9)	21.7 (71.1)	22.2 (72.0)	23.4 (74.1)	23.9 (75.0)	23.6 (74.5)	23.3 (74.0)
Record low °C (°F)	18.6 (65.5)	17.2 (63.0)	17.5 (63.5)	18.7 (65.7)	16.6 (61.9)	17.5 (63.5)	15.0 (59.0)	15.0 (59.0)	16.4 (61.5)	17.2 (63.0)	18.6 (65.5)	17.5 (63.5)	15.0 (59.0)
Average precipitation mm (inches)	11.9 (0.47)	5.5 (0.22)	48.6 (1.91)	89.7 (3.53)	15.5 (0.61)	5.2 (0.20)	3.4 (0.13)	6.6 (0.26)	8.4 (0.33)	30.0 (1.18)	96.9 (3.81)	51.9 (2.04)	373.6 (14.71)
Average precipitation days (≥ 1.0 mm)	2	3	4	5	2	0	0	2	2	3	4	2	29
Average relative humidity (%)	56	54	56	59	56	54	55	55	53	54	59	62	56
Mean monthly sunshine hours	251.1	235.2	263.5	273.0	282.1	255.0	254.2	257.3	270.0	279.0	252.0	241.8	3,114.2
Mean daily sunshine hours	8.1	8.4	8.5	9.1	9.1	8.5	8.2	8.3	9.0	9.0	8.4	7.8	8.5
Source 1: NOAA (precipitation and sun 1961–1990)
Source 2: Deutscher Wetterdienst (humidity, 1961–1990), Meteo Climat (record highs and lows)

== See also ==
- Garissa Airport
- Roman Catholic Diocese of Garissa
- Garissa University College
