= BBS Mall =

Mixed-use development in Nairobi, Kenya

- Business Bay Square
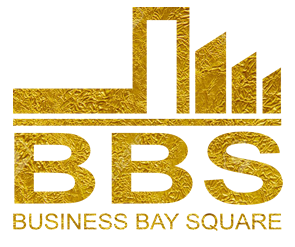

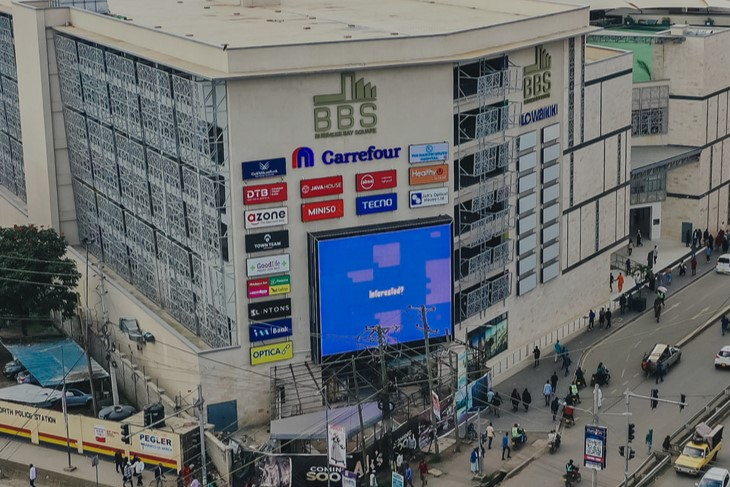
- BBS Mall in 2024
- Location: Eastleigh, Nairobi, Kenya
- Address: General Waruinge Street
- Opened: 2023
- Developer: Ten Commodities Wholesalers Limited
- Owner: Ten Commodities Wholesalers Limited
- Floor area: 130,000 m²
- Parking: 2,200 spaces
- Website: bbsmallnairobi.com

BBS Mall, officially known as Business Bay Square, is a mixed-use commercial development and shopping mall located in Eastleigh, Nairobi, Kenya. Opened in 2023, the complex is among the largest retail and commercial developments in Kenya, with approximately 130,000 square meters of floor space.

== Background ==
The development was constructed in Eastleigh, one of Nairobi's most important commercial districts. Reports indicated that the project cost approximately KSh 25 billion and took about four years to complete before becoming operational in 2023.

Prior to its official commissioning, a significant proportion of retail spaces had already been occupied by businesses operating within the complex.

The mall occupies approximately 130,000 square meters and includes more than 3,500 retail units, banking facilities, healthcare services, restaurants, office space, and parking facilities.

According to reports, the development includes up to 12 banking halls, three hospitals, 32 restaurants, a mosque facility and approximately 2,200 parking spaces.

BBS Mall has been cited as a major contributor to the continued commercial expansion of Eastleigh. The development has attracted retailers, wholesalers, financial institutions, and service providers from Kenya and across the wider East African region.

Within its first year of operation, the mall attracted several banking institutions, including Absa Bank Kenya, I&M Bank, Diamond Trust Bank, Premier Bank, Gulf African Bank, NCBA and Salaam Microfinance Bank.

The opening of the mall was also reported to have contributed to the expansion of Kenya's formal retail sector.

== Notable visits ==
The mall has hosted visits by government officials, diplomats, and business delegations. In 2024, Somali President Hassan Sheikh Mohamud visited the facility during an official trip to Kenya and highlighted Eastleigh's transformation into a major commercial hub.

The mall has also been visited by diplomats and public officials interested in the economic growth of Eastleigh and Nairobi.

== See also ==
- Eastleigh, Nairobi
- Economy of Kenya
