= Microfinance in Kenya =

Microfinance in Kenya consists of microfinance facilities and regulations in Kenya which has been developing since the mid 1990s. Legislation was passed in 2006 with the Micro Finance Act which became active in 2008. By 2010 there were more than twenty large micro finance institutions in Kenya, which provided US $1.5 billion to approximately 1.5 million active borrowers. With over 100,000 clients, Equity Bank Kenya had the largest share of business loans representing market share of 73.50% followed by Kenya Women Microfinance Bank with 12.06%. Most microfinance firms as in other countries have eligibility criteria which may include gender (as in the case for special women's loans), age (at least 18 years of age), a valid Kenyan ID, a business, an ability to repay the loan and be a customer of the institution.

Corruption is a major problem in Kenya. In 2010 Kenya ranked 154th (out of 178) on the International Corruption Index. Political riots such as during elections in year 2007, which led to violence and economic disturbance. As a result of this political risk, the Portfolio at Risk rate increased during the riots during the elections in 2007. And infrastructure issues, where despite the economy having risen at a real growth rate of 4% in 2011, banking infrastructure remains weak.

== Existing regulations ==
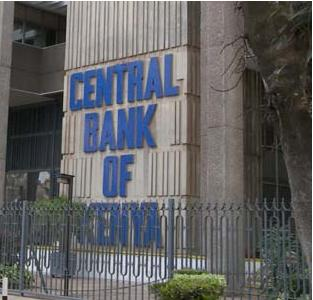
Central bank of Kenya

The banking system in Kenya is regulated by the Companies Act, the Banking Act, and the Central Bank of Kenya Act. In addition, there are several existing guidelines. The responsibility for monetary policy and the banking system is held by the Central Bank of Kenya, which also releases information about interest rates, banking guidelines, and the financial institutions.

The Kenyan Micro Finance Act was adopted in 2006 and became active in 2008. With the adoption of this act, institutions could apply for micro finance licenses at the Kenyan Central Bank either as a national or community institution.

In order to do so, these institutions must be registered as:

- deposit-taking institutions
- non deposit-taking institutions
- informal organizations (supervised by an NGO)

The four steps of approval for a micro finance institution are:

- Approval of name
- Application for license
- Letter of intent
- Issuance of license

== Existing institutions providing micro finance products ==
In 2010, there were more than twenty large micro finance institutions in Kenya, which provided US $1.5 billion to approximately 1.5 million active borrowers. According to their gross loan portfolio, the five largest institutions are:

- Equity Bank Kenya has a market share of 73.50%, a gross loan portfolio of 924,993,804 Kenyan Shilling and 715,969 active borrowers to whom they offer 10 different products.
- Kenya Women Microfinance Bank (KWFT): has a market share of 12.06%, a gross loan portfolio of 152,136,208 Kenyan Shilling and 334,188 active borrowers to whom they offer 6 different products.
- K-Rep Bank has a market share of 6.39%, a gross loan portfolio of 74,182,292 Kenyan Shilling and 82,000 active borrowers to whom they offer 5 different products.
- Faulu has a market share of 3.56%, a gross loan portfolio of 39,643,494 Kenyan Shilling and 102,371 active borrowers to whom they offer 6 different products.
- Jamii Bora has a market share of 0.86%, a gross loan portfolio of 9,568,460 Kenyan Shilling and 79,194 active borrowers to whom they offer 6 different products.

Those institutions offer business loans on a larger scale, specific agriculture loans, education loans, and loans for any other purpose. Additionally there are:

- emergency loans, which are more expensive in respect to interest rates, but are quickly available
- group loans for smaller groups (4-5 members) and larger groups (up to 30 members)
- women loans, which are also available to a group of women

Most of the micro finance institutions offer business loans under different interest rates, duration and amounts. With 101,334 clients, Equity Bank has the largest share of business loans. With 50,000 clients, K-Rep Bank is the second largest institution, followed by Jamii Bora, as the third largest bank for business loans and servicing 37,400 clients. Specializing in loans for women, the KWFT (Kenya Women Finance Trust) holds by far the largest market share, with loans to 334,188 clients.

The educational loans market is narrow, which can be observed by the major player’s client base: KADET services only 220 clients, followed by the Kenya ECLOF (211 clients), SISDO (202 clients), and the Adok Timo (173 clients). The same is true for asset finance loans. The Equity Bank has the largest market share (2,853 clients) and Family Bank the second largest (2,000 clients) in asset financing.

Out of approximately 40 million Kenyans, about 14 million are not able to receive proper financial service through formal loan application services, and 12 million more Kenyans have no access to financial service institutions at all. Further, one million Kenyans are reliant on informal groups for receiving financial aid.

== Conditions for micro finance products ==
- Eligibility criteria: The general criteria might include gender (as in the case for special women's loans), age (at least 18 years of age), a valid Kenyan ID, a business, an ability to repay the loan and be a customer of the institution.
- Credit scoring: There is no advanced credit scoring system and the majority of lenders have not stated any official borrower requirements. However, some institutions require having an existing business for at least 3 months, a small amount of cash, provide the institution with a business plan or proposal, have at least one guarantor, or to attend group meetings or training. For group loans, almost half of the institutions require group members to be guarantor for each other. For Mobile App Lenders, they make use of machine learning algorithms to calculate credit score.
- Interest rate: They are mostly calculated on a flat basis and some at a declining balance. More than 90% of the institutions require monthly interest payments. The average interest rate is 30-40% for loans up to 500,000 Kenyan Shilling. For loans above 500,000 Kenyan Shilling, interest rates go up to 71%.

== Key challenges ==
- Political issues: Corruption is a major problem in Kenya. In 2010 Kenya ranked 154th (out of 178) on the International Corruption Index.
- Furthermore, the lack of transparency leads to uncertainty of effective regulations and acts. Additionally, political riots, especially during elections in year 2007, have led to violence and, therefore, to economic disturbance. As a result, the Portfolio at Risk rate increased during the riots during the elections in 2007.
- Infrastructure issues: Despite the economy having risen at a real growth rate of 4% in 2011, banking infrastructure remains weak and requires significant investment in staff, facilities, and technology.
- Consumer issue: As a result of standardized products without considering customer requirements, many customers are dissatisfied with the terms and wish for more individual loan conditions. For group loans, for example, many clients dislike guaranteeing for each other, because they might not know the other clients well enough. Other clients have complained about time-consuming, weekly meetings and training with trainers, who are often too young and inexperienced. This is especially a cultural problem for older clients, who feel offended by taking advice from younger people.

== See also ==
- SMEP Micro finance Bank
- Kenya
- Micro finance
- Micro credit
- Kenya Law
