= Njuguna Ndung'u =

Kenyan economist (born 1960)

Njūgūna Ndūng'ū
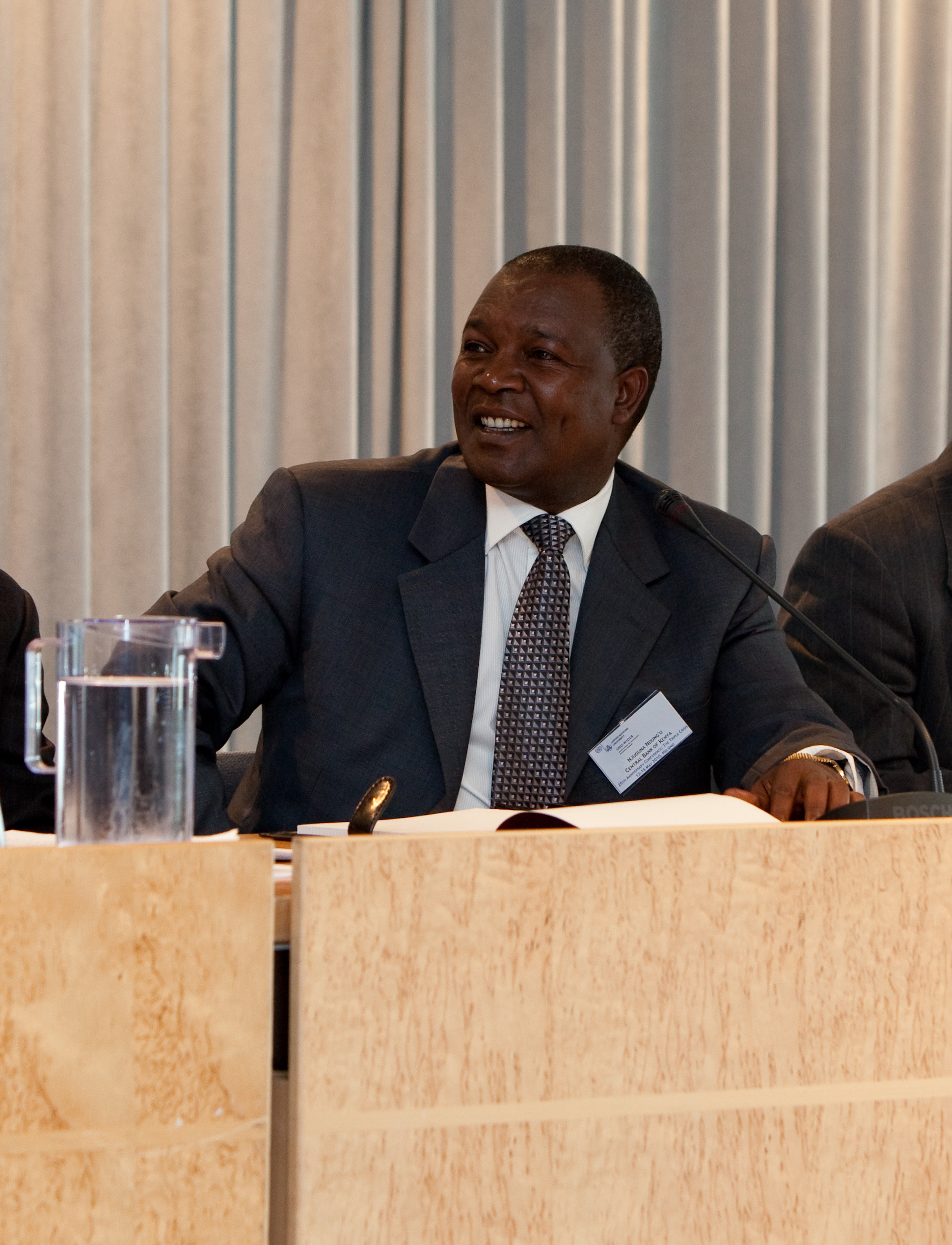
- Born: 1960 (age 65–66); Kandara, Murang'a, Kenya
- Education: University of Nairobi (Bachelor of Arts in Economics) (Master of Arts in Economics); University of Gothenburg (Doctor of Philosophy in Economics)
- Occupations: Economist and academician
- Years active: 1985 to Present
- Title: Professor of Economics; University of Nairobi
- Children: Stephen Ndung'u, Ian Ndung'u and Brenda Ndung'u

Njūgūna S. Ndūng'ū is a Kenyan economist who is the ex-Minister of Finance in the cabinet of President William Samoei Ruto from October 2022 to July 2024.

Ndūng'ū previously served as the eighth Governor of the Central Bank of Kenya for two consecutive four-year terms, from March 2007 until March 2015.

== Early life and education ==
Ndung'u was born in Kandara, Murang'a county in Kenya in 1960. He studied economics at the University of Nairobi, earning both a Bachelor of Arts in Economics and a Master of Arts in Economics from the university. His Doctor of Philosophy, also in economics, was obtained from the University of Gothenburg in Sweden.

== Career ==
=== Career in academia ===
Before his appointment as Governor of the Central Bank of Kenya, Ndūng'ū was the director of training at the African Economic Research Consortium (AERC). He lectured in advanced economic theory and econometrics at the University of Nairobi, where he was an associate professor of economics. He also worked as a regional programme specialist for the Eastern and Southern Africa Regional Office, Nairobi, of the International Development Research Centre, Canada; and at the Kenya Institute for Public Policy Research and Analysis as a principal analyst/researcher and head of the Macroeconomic and Economic Modelling Division.

Ndūng'ū conducted extensive research and teaching work in various fields of economics, including macroeconomics, microeconomics, econometrics, and poverty reduction. He published in international journals as well as chapters in various books on economic policy issues, inflation, interest rate and exchange rate issues, financial management, public sector growth, external debt, financial liberalization in Anglophone Africa, structural adjustment, as well as on employment and labour market issues.

=== Return to academia ===
In 2018, Ndūng'ū re-joined the AERC, this time as executive director. In 2019, he served on the advisory board of the annual Human Development Report of the United Nations Development Programme (UNDP), co-chaired by Thomas Piketty and Tharman Shanmugaratnam.

== Other activities ==
- African Development Bank (AfDB), Ex-Officio Member of the Board of Governors (since 2022)
- East African Development Bank (EADB), Ex-Officio Member of the Governing Council (since 2022)
- International Monetary Fund (IMF), Ex-Officio Member of the Board of Governors (since 2022)
- World Bank, Ex-Officio Member of the Board of Governors (since 2022)

== See also ==
- List of banks in Kenya
- Economy of Kenya
- Kenyan shilling

== Succession table ==
Preceded by Andrew Mullei; 2003 - 2007	Governor of Central Bank of Kenya; 2007 – 2015	Succeeded by Patrick Ngugi Njoroge; 2015 - 2023
