= Robert Donald Munro =

Canadian policy advisor

Robert Donald Munro best known as Bob Munro (September 1, 1942 – January 19, 2025) was a Canadian policy advisor who founded the Mathare Youth Sports Association and Mathare United football team in Nairobi, Kenya. He was the husband of Jamii Bora Bank founder Ingrid Munro. He was appointed to the Order of Canada in 2022 and was named an Elder of the Order of the Burning Spear in 2024 by Kenyan President William Ruto.

Munro worked on the Action Plan at the first UN Environment Conference in 1972 in Stockholm at the beginning of the environmental movement. He then advocated for establishing the UN Environment Program (UNEP) headquarters in Nairobi. He later served as the Canadian Secretary-General for the 1976 UN Conference on Human Settlements, and helped bring the UN-Habitat agency to Nairobi as well.
