= 2013 Kisii local elections =

Local elections in Kenya

Local elections were held in Kisii to elect a Governor and County Assembly on March 4, 2013. Under the new constitution, which was passed in a 2010 referendum, the 2013 general elections were the first in which Governors and members of the County Assemblies for the newly created counties were elected. They will also be the first general elections run by the Independent Electoral and Boundaries Commission(IEBC) which has released the official list of candidates.

== Gubernatorial election ==
Candidate	Running Mate	Coalition	Party	Votes
Machoka, John Oruru	Machuka, Joseph Zebedee		Kenya National Congress	--
Ndemo, Salim Peter	Kerubo, Milkah		FORD–People	--
Nyaberi, Justry P. Lumumba	Minyonga, Zablon Rashid		The National Alliance	--
Nywangweso, Alfred Akunga	Ototo, Elmas Ombaso		United Republican Party	--
Ogutu, Zadoc Abel	Oenga, Daniel Nyanchiri		United Democratic Forum Party	--
Ongwae, James Elvis Omariba	Gongera, Arthur Maangi		Orange Democratic Movement	--

== Prospective candidates ==
The following are some of the candidates who have made public their intentions to run for office of governor in Kisii county:

- Peter Ndemo - A former District Commissioner retired from the civil service
- James Ongwae - former Agriculture Permanent Secretary
- Naftali Mogere - former National Social Security Fund CEO
- Zadoc Ogutu - a university lecturer
- Lumumba Nyaberi - lawyer
