= 2013 Garissa local elections =

Local elections in Kenya

Local elections were held in Garissa County were held on 4 March 2013. Under the new constitution, which was passed in a 2010 referendum, the 2013 general election was the first to elect County Governors and their Deputies for the 47 newly created counties. They were also first general elections run by the Independent Electoral and Boundaries Commission(IEBC), which has released the official list of candidates.

== Gubernatorial election ==
| Candidate | Running Mate | Coalition | Party | Votes |
|---|---|---|---|---|
| Adan, Nathif Jama | Ali, Abdullahi Hussein | | Wiper Democratic Movement – Kenya | -- |
| Korane, Ali Bunow | Sheikh, Ahmednadhir Omar | | The National Alliance | -- |
| Shurie, Mohamed Moulid | Buro, Yussuf Noor | | United Democratic Forum Party | -- |
| Yussuf, Harun Mohamed | Sheikh, Abdullahi Abdirahman | | Orange Democratic Movement | -- |

== Prospective candidates ==
The following are some of the candidates who made public their intentions to run:

- Mohammed Maulid Shurie – former CEO of the Northern Water Service Board
- Nathif Adam – former chief executive officer of First Community Bank
- Harun Yussuf – former Garissa High Secondary School
- Bunow Korane – former permanent secretary
