= M Oriental Bank =

Private Kenyan commercial bank

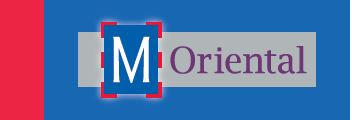
- Company type: Private
- Industry: Financial services
- Founded: 2002; 24 years ago
- Headquarters: Nairobi, Kenya
- Key people: Shanti V. Shah (chairman); Nitin Shendye (CEO)
- Products: Checking, savings, investments, Trade Finances
- Revenue: ▲ Aftertax: KSh96.5 million (US$965,000) (2017)
- Total assets: KSh10.577 billion (approx. US$106 million) (2017)
- Number of employees: 98 (2024)
- Website: moriental.co.ke

M Oriental Bank, previously known as Oriental Commercial Bank Limited, is a commercial bank in Kenya, the largest economy in the East African Community. It is licensed by the Central Bank of Kenya, the central bank and national banking regulator.

== Overview ==
As of December 2017, the bank's total assets were valued at KSh10.577 billion (approx. US$106 million), with KSh3.028 billion (approx. US$30.3 million) in shareholders' funds. In June 2016, the bank announced a change in business strategy. MOB will cease to operate as a retail bank and instead become a private bank, with focus on serving family-owned businesses and high net-worth individuals. The use of ATMs will also be phased out.

== Ownership ==
In 2016, Oriental Commercial Bank was officially re-branded to M Oriental Bank Limited, after the Central Bank of Kenya gave approval to M Holdings Limited to acquire majority shares. M Holdings Limited, a Kenyan owned and registered company subsequently opted to acquire only 33.8 percent. As of 31 December 2017, the shareholding in the stock of the bank was as illustrated in the table below.

M Oriental Bank stock ownership
Rank	Name of owner	Percentage ownership
1	M Holdings Limited	33.83
2	Pasha Investments Limited	7.68
3	Nalinkumar Meghji Shah	6.51
4	Sag Investment Limited	4.32
5	Rupen Mulchand Haria	4.11
6	Bank One Limited	3.68
7	Others with 4.0 percent or less each	39.87
	Total	100.00

== Branch network ==
The bank maintains a network of branches at the following locations:

1. Westlands Branch – Apollo Centre, 2nd Floor, Ring Road, Westlands, Nairobi
2. Koinange Street Branch – Finance House, Ground Floor, Koinange Street, Nairobi
3. Sameer Business Park – Sameer Business Park, Mombasa Road, Nairobi
4. Mombasa Branch – HassanAli Building, Nkurumah Road, Mombasa
5. Nakuru Branch – AFC Building, Kijabe Row, Nakuru
6. Eldoret Branch – Muya House, Kenyatta Street, Eldoret
7. Kitale Branch – Robert Ouko Road, Kitale

== Governance ==
The bank is governed by a six-person board of directors. Shanti Shah, one of the non-executive directors, serves as the chairman. The chief executive officer is Alakh Kohli.

== See also ==
- List of banks in Kenya
- Economy of Kenya
