= SBM Bank Kenya Limited =

Commercial bank in Kenya

- Company type: Private company
- Industry: Financial services
- Founded: 1988; 38 years ago
- Headquarters: Nairobi,, Kenya
- Key people: Sattar Abdoula; Chairman; Bhartesh Shah; Chief Executive Officer
- Products: Loans, Savings, Checking, Investments, Debit Cards, Credit Cards
- Revenue: ▲(After-tax): US$12.41 million (KSh1.241 billion) (2018)
- Total assets: US$706.23 million (KSh70.65 billion) (2018)
- Number of employees: ~1,500 (2018)
- Parent: State Bank of Mauritius
- Website: www.sbmbank.co.ke

SBM Bank (Kenya) Limited (previously known as Fidelity Commercial Bank Limited), is a commercial bank in Kenya, the largest economy in the East African Community. It is licensed by the Central Bank of Kenya, the country's central bank and national banking regulator.

The bank is a medium-sized retail bank, serving mainly the urban areas of Nairobi and Mombasa. As of December 2018, SBM Bank Kenya had an asset base of KSh70,647,739,000 (approx. US$706.23 million), with shareholder's equity of KSh6,937,506,000 (approx. US$69.35 million).

After the Chase Bank acquisition in 2018, SBM Kenya accounted for 2.4 percent of all banking assets in the country. The total assets inherited from Chase Bank in 2018, were valued at approximately US$600 million.

== History ==
The institution was incorporated in 1988 as African Finance Company. In 1992, the finance company re-branded as Fidelity Finance Limited. In 1996, the institution re branded again as Fidelity Commercial Bank Limited, having been granted a banking license by the Central Bank of Kenya, the national banking regulator.

In 2013 the bank was accused of insider lending by top shareholders of the bank against CBK rules.

In November 2016, SEM listed SBM Group announced that it has reached an agreement to acquire a majority stake in the bank. This process was concluded in May 2017 and the bank's name was changed to SBM Bank (Kenya) Limited.

In April 2018, SBM Holdings of Mauritius concluded the acquisition of the majority of assets and liabilities of Chase Bank Kenya Limited, which had been under receivership since April 2016. It was expected that those assets and liabilities, together with the 1,300 Chase Bank employees, in about 62 branches, would be absorbed in SBM Bank Kenya. That acquisition began in April 2018, with conclusion planned for August 2018.

== Ownership ==
SBM Bank (Kenya) is a privately held institution. It is a subsidiary of Mauritian based SBM Holdings. One other shareholder is the private equity firm Duet Group of the United Kingdom, which acquired its shareholding in March 2016 for KSh1.9 billion (approx. US$19 million).

== See also ==
- Central Bank of Kenya
- List of banks in Kenya
- List of banks in Africa
- Economy of Kenya
