= Middle East Bank (Kenya) =

Commercial bank in Kenya

Middle East Bank Kenya Limited
- Company type: Private
- Industry: Banking
- Founded: 1981
- Headquarters: Mebank Tower; Jakaya Kikwete Road; Nairobi, Kenya
- Key people: A.A.K. Esmail (chairman), Isaac N. Mwige (managing director)
- Total assets: US$ 100m (Kes 11.02 billion) (2020)
- Website: www.mebkenya.com

Middle East Bank Kenya is a commercial bank in Kenya. It is licensed by the Central Bank of Kenya, the central bank and national banking regulator.

It is a small retail bank that focuses on meeting the needs of large corporations and high-net-worth individuals. As of December 2013, the bank was ranked number 41, by assets, out of a total of 43 commercial banks in Kenya. as of December 2020, the bank's total assets were valued at about US$100 million (KES: 11.02 billion), with shareholders' equity of approximately US$13 million (KES: 1.124 billion).

== History ==
Middle East Bank Kenya Ltd started operations in Kenya in August 1981, after receiving a banking license from the Central Bank of Kenya, the national banking regulator. The initial shareholders in the bank were the Al-Futtaim Group, affiliated with the Middle East Bank Group of United Arab Emirates. In 1991, the Al-Futtaim Group divested from the bank, leaving shareholding in Kenyan hands.

In 1995, Banque Belgolaise, a Belgian financial institution acquired 25% shareholding in Middle East Bank Kenya, becoming the single largest shareholder. As a result of multiple bank mergers and acquisitions, that 25% shareholding subsequently came to be owned by BNP Paribas Fortis. 75% shareholding remains in private Kenyan hands.

== Ownership ==
The shares of stock of Middle East Bank Kenya are privately held. The largest single shareholder, with 25% shareholding, is BNP Paribas Fortis, a Belgian financial services provider that is a subsidiary of BNP Paribas, a French banking conglomerate that is the largest banking group in the world. Shareholding in Middle East Bank is depicted in the table below:

Middle East Bank Kenya stock ownership
| Rank | Name of owner | Percentage ownership |
|---|---|---|
| 1 | BNP Paribas Fortis of Belgium | 25.00 |
| 2 | Institutional and individual Kenyan investors | 75.00 |
| | Total | 100.00 |

== Branch network ==
as of December 2020, the bank maintains its headquarters in Nairobi, Kenya's capital and largest city. It has three branches; two in Nairobi and another in Mombasa, Kenya's second-largest city.

- Main Branch – Mebank Tower, Milimani Road, Nairobi
- Industrial Area Branch – Butere Road, off Dar es Salaam Road, Nairobi
- Mombasa Branch – Nkrumah Road, Mombasa
- Eldoret Branch – Enterprise Road, Nairobi

== See also ==
- List of banks in Kenya
- Central Bank of Kenya
- Economy of Kenya
