= Citibank Kenya =

The Kenyan branch of Citibank N.A

Citibank N.A. Kenya
- Type: Branch of Citibank N.A.
- Industry: Banking
- Founded: 1974; 52 years ago
- Headquarters: Upper Hill, Nairobi, Kenya
- Products: Corporate and institutional banking
- Revenue: ▼KES 13.2 million (2025)
- Net income: ▼KES 5.6 million (2025)
- Total assets: ▼KES 196.5 million (2025)
- Number of employees: ▲203 (2025)
- Parent: Citigroup
- Website: Homepage

Citibank N.A. Kenya is the Kenyan branch of Citibank N.A., the banking subsidiary of the United States-based Citigroup. Is a commercial bank in Kenya, the largest economy in the East African Community. It is licensed by the Central Bank of Kenya, the country's central bank and national banking regulator. The bank offers corporate banking, investment banking, treasury, trade finance and cash management services.

== Overview ==
Citi, then known as First National City Bank, was granted a banking licensed by the CBK on 1 July 1974. The bank has concentrated on corporate and institutional clients rather than retail customers. In the 1980s it financed enterprises including Panafrican Paper Mills and increased its capital to comply with Kenyan banking regulations. It opened a branch in Mombasa in 1989.

In the 1990s it introduced interest-bearing current accounts and bearer certificates of deposit, developed a clearing system for airline ticket sales and in 1996 led the US$50 million privatization financing of Kenya Airways.

In 2001 it took over the Kenyan operations of ABN AMRO making it the Kenya's fourth-largest bank as a result.

The bank has historically operated from Nairobi and Mombasa. In August 2026, Citibank announced that its Mombasa branch would close with effect from 30 November 2026. The bank stated that it would consolidate its physical operations at its Nairobi headquarters and that it had received the required regulatory approvals.

== See also ==
- List of banks in Kenya
- Citibank Uganda
