= SMEP Microfinance Bank =

- Type: Public
- Industry: Banking/financial
- Founded: 1975; 51 years ago
- Headquarters: Nairobi, Kenya
- Key people: Nelson Kuria – chairman Symon Kamore – CEO
- Products: Loans, insurance
- Revenue: ▲KES 552.5 million (2014)
- Net income: ▼KES: -97.02 million (2014)
- Total assets: ▼KES: 2.38 billion (2014)
- Total equity: ▼KES: 554.8 million (2014)
- Number of employees: 260
- Website: www.smep.co.ke

SMEP Microfinance Bank Limited is a public limited company incorporate under the companies Act (Cap 486) and licensed under the Microfinance Act (Cap 493D) regulated by the Central Bank of Kenya to offer banking services focusing on group banking, SME and church banking. SMEP has a subsidiary company, SMEP Insurance Agency, which provides insurance services to diverse customer insurance needs

== Overview ==
SMEP offers retail banking and asset finance to individuals, groups, corporations and churches. The term SMEP is derived from "Small and Micro Enterprise Programme". As of May 2019 SMEP had 19 banking branches, supported by 11 marketing units and over 40 SMEP agents around Kenya.

== History ==
SMEP Mircofinance Bank started out in 1975 as a relief arm of the National Council of Churches of Kenya (NCCK). This program's objective was to feed the poor people in Nairobi's Mathare slum. Later, NCCK realized that the poor needed to be self-reliant and economically empower and thus converted the feeding program into a micro-credit scheme known as Small Scale Business Enterprise (SSBE).

In 1998 the Small Scale Business Enterprise (SSBE) was renamed Small and Micro Enterprise Programme and in 1999 it was incorporated as a company limited by guarantee. In 2008, Small and Micro Enterprise Programme adopted its acronym "SMEP" as its official name and was registered as a company limited by shares. SMEP partnered with Kiva in 2009 and has seen them been able to extend credit on behalf of other Kiva lenders.

On 14 December 2010, SMEP was awarded a deposit taking licence by the Central Bank of Kenya. Making it the third deposit taking microfinance institution (MFI) in Kenya. The firm's name was then changed to SMEP DTM i.e. SMEP Deposit Taking Microfinance. SMEP DTM sought to raise capital through private placement in the last quarter of 2012. The share offer was valued at KSH 1.6 billion. This share offer only manage to receive 16.7 per cent subscription making it an unsuccessful offer.

The firm adopted the name SMEP Microfinance Bank in 2013 in line with the Microfinance Amendment Act of 2013. The firm entered the insurance business in 2015 with the launch of its subsidiary, the SMEP Insurance Agency company.

== Ownership ==
The shareholding in SMEP Mircofinance Bank is summarized in the table below:

Stock ownership in SMEP Mircofinance Bank
Rank	Name of owner	Percentage ownership
1	Small and Micro Enterprise Programme	36.67
2	Other	63.33
	Total	100.00

Note: Small and Micro Enterprise Programme is a company limited by guarantee and wholly owed by the NCCK.

== Governance ==
SMEP Mircofinance Bank is governed by a six-person board of directors. Nelson Kuria is the chairman of the board, and Symon Kamore serves as the chief executive officer, although he is not a member of the board of directors.

== See also ==
- Microfinance in Kenya
- Central Bank of Kenya
- NCCK
- List of banks in Kenya
