= Sheila M'Mbijjewe =

- Born: March 6, 1958 (age 68); Kenya
- Citizenship: Kenyan
- Education: Kingston University (Bachelor of Arts in Accounting); Association of Chartered Certified Accountants (Chartered Certified Accountant)
- Occupations: Accountant and Central Banker
- Years active: 2015 — present
- Known for: Accounting
- Title: Deputy Governor of the Central Bank of Kenya

Sheila M'Mbijjewe is a Kenyan accountant who has served as the Deputy Governor of the Central Bank of Kenya since 2015.

== Background and education ==
Sheila M'Mbijjew was born in Kenya on 6 March 1958. She holds a bachelor's degree in accounting, from Kingston University, in the United Kingdom. She is also a Chartered Certified Accountant.

== Career ==
She has served as the deputy governor of the Central Bank of Kenya, deputing Patrick Ngugi Njoroge, since 4 August 2015. She was appointed to that position in June 2015.

She has a long history of service in Kenya's private banking sector and financial environment. She has served as a board member in several companies, including Deloitte Touché Kenya, Pricewaterhouse Kenya, the Capital Markets Authority, the Nairobi Stock Exchange, Old Mutual Insurance Company Kenya and the Financial Reporting Centre of Kenya.

== Other considerations ==
In 2008, Sheila M'Mbijjewe was awarded the Moran of the Burning Spear (MBS), a presidential medal for service to her country.

== See also ==
- Economy of Kenya
