= Kenya Women Microfinance Bank =

Microfinance bank in Kenya

- Company type: Private
- Industry: Financial services
- Founded: 2008
- Headquarters: Nairobi, Kenya
- Key people: Jennifer Riria (Group Chief Executive)
- Products: Loans, checking, savings, investments, debit cards
- Revenue: ▲: Aftertax US$4+ million (KSh395.5 million (2013)
- Total assets: US$220+ million (KES:21.75 billion) (2013)
- Website: www.kwftbank.com

Kenya Women Microfinance Bank, formerly Kenya Women Finance Trust or KWFT, is a deposit-taking microfinance bank in Kenya, the largest economy in the East African Community.

== Overview ==
KWFT is a medium-tier financial services provider in Kenya. As of December 2013, it was the largest deposit-taking microfinance bank in the country, with an asset base valued at about US$220 million (KES:21.75 billion). At that time, the microfinance bank had in excess of 600,000 deposit accounts and a loan book of approximately US$147 million (KSh:14.53 billion), and shareholders' equity valued at US$29.5 million (KShs:2.9 billion).

== History ==
The company was established in 2008, as Kenya Women Finance Trust (KWFT), a 100% subsidiary Kenya Women's Holding (KWH). In 2010, the institution was authorized to accept customer deposits, thereby becoming a deposit-taking microfinance institution. It changed its name to Kenya Women Microfinance Bank and became regulated by the Central Bank of Kenya (CBK). In order to comply with CBK regulations, KWH began to sell shareholding to the KWFT Board, staff, and foreign institutions. In July 2015 it sold 25% equity to 60,974 KWFT members, thereby reducing its own shareholding to the required 25% maximum.

== Future plans ==
In 2016, print media reported that the lender had plans to expand to Rwanda and South Sudan by the third quarter of 2017.

== Ownership ==
The shares of stock of Kenya Women Microfinance Bank are held by Kenyan and foreign institutions and individuals, as depicted in the table below:

Kenya Women Microfinance Bank stock ownership
Rank	Name of owner	Percentage ownership
1	Kenya Women's Holding Limited	25.0
2	Foreign institutional investors	25.0
3	60,974 KWFT members	25.0
4	KWFT board members	20.0
5	KWFT staff	5.0
	Total	100.00

== Branches ==
The microfinance bank has branches in rural and urban areas of Kenya.

== See also ==
- List of banks in Kenya
- Microfinance in Kenya
