= Chase Bank Kenya =

Commercial bank in Kenya

Chase Bank Kenya Limited
- Type: Private
- Industry: Financial services
- Founded: 1996
- Fate: Liquidated and merged into SBM Bank
- Headquarters: Nairobi, Kenya
- Key people: Muthoni Kuria (Chairman); Paul Njaga Managing Director & CEO
- Products: Loans, Checking, Savings, Investments, Debit Cards
- Revenue: ▼ Aftertax: US$7.97 million (KES:792 million) (2015)
- Total assets: US$1.428 billion (KES:142 billion) (2015)
- Number of employees: 1000+ (2014)
- Website: www.chasebankkenya.co.ke

Chase Bank Kenya Limited (CBK), commonly referred to as Chase Bank, was a commercial bank in Kenya, licensed by the Central Bank of Kenya, the central bank and national banking regulator.

Chase Bank was a large financial services provider in Kenya, with an estimated asset valuation of approximately US$1.428 billion (KES:142 billion), as of December 2015. At that time, shareholders' equity was valued at US$119.7 million (KES:11.9 billion).

== History ==
In 1995, several business people acquired a 60% stake in United Bank (Kenya), after paying approximately US$1.23 million (Kenya Shillings 95 million). At that time the bank's headquarters were located in the western town of Kisumu, approximately 340 kilometres (210 mi), by road, northwest of Nairobi, Kenya's capital and largest city.

At that time, United Bank (Kenya) was in receivership and was under statutory administration by the Central Bank of Kenya, the country's banking regulator. Its paid-up capital, then, was approximately US$970,000 and it had an asset base valued at approximately US$1.9 million. In 1996, the bank opened for business under the new owners who rebranded to its present name. In 1997, a decision was made to relocate the bank's only branch at the time, from Kisumu to Nairobi. Over the years, Chase Bank (Kenya) has progressively improved its bottom line by growing its customer base and increasing its profitability.

=== Statutory management ===
On 7 April 2016, Chase Bank was placed under receivership by the Central Bank of Kenya making it the third bank to be placed under receivership in a twelve-month period. This was mainly due under reporting of insider loans and not meeting the statutory banking ratios. Chase Bank re-opened on 27 April 2016 with KCB as the receiver manager.

In April 2016, the bank was put under statutory management by the CBK following what it termed 'unsafe financial conditions'. The liquidity problems that it faced followed social media reports after the resignation of two of its directors. The reports showed that its profits in 2015 fell to Ksh. 742 million from 2.3 billion in 2014. The statements also revealed that non performing loans had risen from Ksh. 3 billion in 2014 to Ksh. 11 billion in 2015.

In April 2016, Inspector General of Police Joseph Boinnet ordered the arrest of Chase bank's executives to answer questions about mismanagement in the bank. After closure for two weeks, the bank reopened on 27 April 2016 under management of Kenya Commercial Bank.

=== Liquidation ===
In April 2018, the central bank announced that State Bank of Mauritius would be acquiring certain assets and matched liabilities from Chase Bank's. This deal included 75% of deposits, bank staff and branches and merging them with the operations of its Kenyan subsidiary, SBM Kenya. The remaining assets and liabilities were then transferred to Kenya Deposit Insurance Corporation for liquidation.

== Ownership ==
In March 2013, Amethis Finance, a development finance company based in Paris, France, invested US$10.5 million (KES:900 million) into the bank, thereby taking an equity position in Chase Bank (Kenya). In October 2013, a European Private Equity Fund, invested KSh1.5 billion into the bank, taking up an equity position into the institution.

As of April 2015, the then shareholders in the stock of the bank are summarized in the table below:

Stock Ownership in Chase Bank Kenya Limited
Rank	Name of Owner	Percentage Ownership
1	Rinascimento Global Limited	15.9
2	Shegas Limited	13.9
3	Balst Investment Holdings Limited	11.2
4	Amethis Finance of France	10.9
5	Festuca Investments Limited	9.3
6	German Investment Corporation (DEG)	6.6
7	Carlo Van Wageningen	6.5
8	Employee Stock Ownership Plan	4.3
9	Responsability investments / ResponsAbility Participations AG	3.4
10	Namaja Investments Limited	3.0
11	Other Local & International Investors	15.0
	Total	100.00

== Member Companies ==
=== Subsidiaries ===
Other than the banking business, Chase Bank had the following subsidiaries:

- RAFIKI Microfinance Bank Limited – 75% Shareholding – A deposit-taking microfinance bank.
- Chase Insurance Agency Limited – 100% Shareholding – The Insurance agency arm of the business.

== Branches ==
As of April 2016, the bank maintained a network of branches at the following locations:

Nairobi Branches

1. City Centre Branch – Prudential Assurance Building, Wabera Street Nairobi
2. Buru Buru Branch – Kenol Buru Buru, Mumias South Road, Nairobi
3. Diamond Plaza Branch – Diamond Plaza, Parklands, Nairobi
4. Donholm Branch – East Gate Shopping Mall, Nairobi
5. Eastleigh Branch – Sunrise Shopping Mall, First Avenue, Eastleigh, Nairobi,
6. Elite Banking Centre – 1st Floor, ABC Towers, Waiyaki Way, Nairobi
7. Embakasi Branch – Ground Floor, Taj Shopping Mall, Outer Ring Road, Embakasi, Nairobi
8. Hurlingham Branch – Ground Floor, Northern Wing, Landmark Plaza, Argwings Kodhek Road, Nairobi
9. Ngara Branch – Peace Plaza, Ngara Road, Nairobi
10. Parklands Branch – Ground Floor, Mediplaza, Third Avenue, Parklands, Nairobi
11. Riverside Mews Branch – Riverside Mews, Riverside Drive, Nairobi
12. Sameer Park Branch – Sameer Park, Mombasa Road, Nairobi
13. Strathmore Branch – Strathmore Student Center, Madaraka Estate, Ole Sangale Road, Nairobi
14. Upper Hill Branch – KMA Centre, Junction of Chyulu / Mara Road, Upper Hill, Nairobi
15. Village Market Branch – 3rd Level, Village Market, Limuru Road, Gigiri, Nairobi
16. Windsor Branch – Ridgeways Mall, Kiambu Road, Nairobi
17. Ongata Rongai Branch – Masaai Mall, Rongai Road Nairobi
18. Delta Branch – Delta Towers, Westlands Roundabout Nairobi
19. Lunga Lunga Branch, next to Tuskys Lunga Lunga, Industrial Area Nairobi
20. River Road Branch – Sundries Plaza, Ground floor, River Road Next to Sagret Hotel Nairobi
21. Kilimani Branch – Adlife Plaza, Kilimani Nairobi
22. Kasuku Express Branch – Kasuku Center, Kileleshwa Nairobi
23. Karen Branch – Water Mark, Business Plaza, Karen Nairobi
24. Lavington Branch – 3rd Floor, Lavington Green Mall, Lavington Nairobi
25. Kimathi Branch – Ansh Plaza, Kimathi Street Nairobi
26. Madaraka Express Branch – Along Langata Road Opp Getrudes at TOTAL Gas Station Nairobi

Mombasa Branches

1. Bondeni Branch – Ground Floor, Suhufi Palace, Abdel Nasser Road, Mombasa
2. Mombasa Branch – Ground Floor, Jubilee Building, Moi Avenue, Mombasa
3. Nyali Branch – Nyali Plaza, Links Road, Mombasa
4. Mtwapa Branch – Tuskys Mall, Mtwapa Mombasa
5. Old Town Branch – Opposite Central Police Station Mombasa
6. KPA Branch – KPA Mombasa
7. Kilifi Express Branch – Kenol Kobil, Kilifi Road Kilifi

Upcountry branches

1. Eldoret Branch – Utamaduni Building, Kenyatta Street, Eldoret
2. Kisii Branch – Royal Towers, Hospital Road, Kisii
3. Kisumu Branch – West Emporium, Oginga Odinga Street, Kisumu
4. Kisumu Express – Naivas Mall, Jomo Kenyatta Road, Kisumu
5. Malindi Branch – Links Road, Opposite Multi Grocers Limited, Malindi
6. Nakuru Branch – Spikes Business Centre, Kenyatta Avenue, Nakuru
7. Thika Branch – Nelleon Building, Kenyatta Avenue, Thika
8. Machakos Branch – at Naivas House, along Mwatu wa Ngoma Rd., Machakos Town Machakos
9. Garissa Branch – Lilac Plaza along Kismayu Road
10. Narok Branch – Ol Talet Mall. Ground Floor, Opposite KCB Along Nairobi Kisii Highway Narok
11. Kitale Branch – Nakumatt Mall, Mega Centre Kitale
12. Kericho Branch – Ratan Plaza along Kenyatta Road Kericho

== Governance ==
The bank was governed by an eight-person board of directors. Musoni Kuria, was the Chairman of the Board. Paul Njaga, served as the managing director and chief executive officer.

== See also ==
- List of banks in Kenya
- Central Bank of Kenya
- Economy of Kenya
