= Guardian Bank =

Kenyan privately-owned financial institution

- Company type: Private
- Industry: Banking
- Founded: 1992
- Headquarters: Nairobi, Kenya
- Key people: Maganlal M. Chandaria (Chairman), Vasant Shetty (Managing Director)
- Products: Loans, Transaction accounts, Savings, Investments, Debit Cards
- Net income: ▲Aftertax: KSh.225.5 million/= (US$2.194 million) (H1:2018)
- Total assets: KSh.16.186 billion/= (US$157.4 million) (H1:2018)
- Owner: Chandaria Industries Limited
- Website: guardian-bank.com

Guardian Bank, whose full name is Guardian Bank Limited, is a commercial bank in Kenya with headquarters in Nairobi. It is licensed by Central Bank of Kenya, the central bank and national banking regulator.

As of December 2018, the bank was a medium-sized retail bank, with an asset base totaling approximately KSh.16.186 billion/= (US$157.4 million), and shareholders' equity of about KSh.2.557 billion/= (US$24.87 million). Figures from the previous year ranked Guardian, with a market share of 0.40%, the 26th largest Kenyan bank among 43 licensed financial institutions in its class.

== History ==
Guardian Bank was established in 1992 as Euro Finance Limited, a non-bank financial institution. As a result of the changes in the banking laws of Kenya, Euro Finance Limited converted into a commercial bank in 1996 and rebranded to Guardian Bank Limited. In December 1999, the bank merged with Guilders International Bank Limited, keeping its current name, after the merger.

== Ownership ==
The stock of Guardian Bank is privately held. The detailed shareholding in the bank is not widely publicly known. The bank operates as a subsidiary of Chandaria Industries Limited, a business conglomerate that is also in involved in manufacture of paper, paper products, toilet tissue, facial tissues and other paper derivatives.

== Branch network ==
As of November 2019, Guardian Bank Limited maintains branches at the following locations:

- Nairobi
  - Head Office - 1st & 2nd Floors, Guardian Centre, Biashara Street, Nairobi
  - Biashara Street Branch - Guardian Centre, Biashara Street, Nairobi
  - Mombasa Road Branch - Ground Floor, Tulip House, Nairobi
  - Westlands Branch - Brick Court House, Mpaka Road, Westlands, Nairobi
  - Ngong Road Branch - Ground Floor, The Greenhouse, Ngong Road, Nairobi
- Western
  - Eldoret Branch - Biharilal House, Uganda Road, Eldoret
  - Kisumu Branch - Ground Floor, Amalo Plaza, Oginga Odinga Road, Kisumu
  - Nakuru Branch - Ground Floor, Parana House, Kenyatta Avenue, Nakuru
- Coastal
  - Mombasa Branch - Oriental Building, Nkrumah Road, Mombasa
  - Nyali Branch - Ground Floor, Links Plaza, Links Road, Nyali

== See also ==
- List of banks in Kenya
- Central Bank of Kenya
- Economy of Kenya
