= Consolidated Bank of Kenya =

Commercial bank in Nairobi

- Company type: Parastatal
- Industry: Financial services
- Founded: 7 December 1989; 36 years ago
- Headquarters: Nairobi, Kenya
- Key people: Charles Muriuki Njagagua (chairman); Sam Muturi (CEO)
- Products: Loans, savings, bancassurance, trade finance, digital banking
- Revenue: ▲: After tax: US$2.092 million (KES:211.3 million) (2016)
- Total assets: US$136.2 million (KES: 13.9 billion) (2016)
- Website: consolidated-bank.com

Consolidated Bank of Kenya commonly known as Consolidated Bank, is a commercial bank in Nairobi, Kenya, East Africa's largest economy. It is licensed by the Central Bank of Kenya.

== Overview ==
Consolidated Bank is a medium-sized financial services provider in Kenya. As of December 2017, the bank's total asset valuation stood at about US$133.6 million (KES: 13.5 billion), with Shareholders' Equity valued at about US$10.5 million (KES: 1.06 billion). As at December 2017, the bank was rated number 33, by assets, out of 40 licensed banks in Kenya.

== History ==
The bank was incorporated in 1989, as a result of the merger of the following nine insolvent financial institutions:

1. Jimba Credit Corporation Limited
2. Union Bank of Kenya Limited
3. Kenya Savings and Mortgages Limited
4. Estate Finance Company of Kenya Limited
5. Estate Building Society
6. Business Finance Company Limited
7. Citizen Building Society
8. Nationwide Finance Company Limited
9. Home Savings and Mortgages Limited

Consolidated Bank aims to meet the banking needs of both individuals and institutions. In the beginning, the institution was limited to collecting the debts of the failed legacy financial institutions. However, the Central Bank of Kenya issued CBKL with a full commercial banking license in 2001.

Banking services include current accounts, savings accounts, fixed and call deposits, loan and overdraft facilities, local and overseas money transfer services, and local and international trade finance. The bank is also active on the local inter-bank money market.

== Ownership ==
Consolidated Bank is fully owned by the government, with its majority shareholding (85.8%) held by the National Treasury. The remaining shareholding is spread over 25 parastatals and other quasi-government organizations as set out below.

Consolidated Bank stock ownership
| Rank | Name of owner | Percentage ownership |
|---|---|---|
| 1 | National Treasury | 85.8 |
| 2 | National Social Security Fund | 5.0 |
| 3 | Kenya National Assurance 2001 | 2.4 |
| 4 | Kenya National Assurance Company Limited | 1.9 |
| 5 | Kenya Pipeline Company Limited | 1.6 |
| 6 | Kenya National Examination Council | 1.5 |
| 7 | Kenya Public Trustees | 1.5 |
| 8 | Kenya Posts and Telecommunications Corporation | 1.4 |
| 9 | National Hospital Insurance Fund | 1.3 |
| 10 | Kenya Local Government Officers Superannuation Fund | 1.1 |
| 11 | Other shareholders | 4.4 |
| | Total | 100.00 |

As of December 2018, Consolidated Bank maintains 17 branches in urban areas of Kenya.

== See also ==
- List of banks in Kenya
- Central Bank of Kenya
- Economy of Kenya
