= Bank of India (Uganda) =

Commercial bank in Uganda

- Type: Private
- Industry: Financial services
- Founded: 2012
- Headquarters: Kampala, Uganda
- Key people: Rajneesh Karnatak; Group CEO; Dr Wenceslaus Rama Makuza; Chairman; Srikant Ashok Wikhe; Managing Director and CEO
- Products: Retail Banking, Corporate Banking, Investments, Remittances, Loans
- Revenue: ▲Aftertax:US$ 1,106,864 + (UGX 4.1 billion) (2018)
- Total assets: (UGX 204 billion) (US$ 54.91 million) (2018)
- Number of employees: 40
- Parent: Bank of India
- Website: Homepage

Bank of India (Uganda) Limited (BOIUL), commonly referred to as Bank of India (Uganda), is a commercial bank in Uganda. The MD of this bank is Mr.Srikant Ashok Wikhe. It is licensed by the Bank of Uganda, the national banking regulator.

== Overview ==
Bank of India Uganda Limited opened in 2012 with an objective to become a key financial player for corporate, medium business and up-market retail customers and developmental banking for micro and small business, while providing cost effective services. It offers a wide range of products that include savings deposit, current account, fixed deposits, recurring deposit, personal loans, retail loans, SME loans, corporate loans, bill discounting, letters of credit and bank guarantees.

As of December 2018 Bank of India (Uganda) had total assets of USh 204 billion, with customer deposits of USh 125.45 billion, and a loan book of Shs 127.34 billion. During the 12 months ended 31 December 2018, the bank recorded a profit of USh 4.1 billion after taxes.

== History ==
Bank of India began its international expansion in 1946 by opening its first branch in London and the first Indian Bank to do so. It opened branches in Tokyo (1950), Singapore (1951), Kenya and Uganda (1953), Hong Kong (1960) and so on. Following the expulsion of Asians from the country by Idi Amin in 1972, BOIU sold its assets to Bank of Baroda and exited the country. In 2012, the BOIUL returned as it was issued a commercial banking license by the Bank of Uganda and it started business operations on 18 June 2012. The Bank has been making profits from the first year of its operations and declared the dividends in its fifth year of operations. The bank is one of the better performing bank amongst all the newer banks in the country in terms of business growth, profitability and asset quality with nil NPA.

== Bank of India Group ==
BOIUL is a member of the Bank of India Group, a financial services conglomerate whose shares are listed on the Bombay Stock Exchange. The stock of the group is 65.9 percent owned by the Government of India. The group is one of the five largest banks in India, with over 5,000 branches, spread over 23 countries (60 offices) and over 8,000 ATMs. The member companies of Bank of India Group include but are not limited to the following:

- Bank of India: India
- Bank of India (Botswana): Botswana
- Bank of India (Kenya): Kenya
- Bank of India (Tanzania): Tanzania
- Bank of India (Uganda): Uganda
- Indo-Zambia Bank Limited: Zambia (20 percent shareholding)
- Bank of India (South Africa): South Africa
- Bank of India (New Zealand): New Zealand
- Bank of India: New York
- Bank of India: London
- Bank of India: Paris
- Bank of India: Tokyo
- Bank of India: Hong Kong
- Bank of India: Singapore

== Location ==
BOIUL has two branches located at 37 Jinja Road, Kampala-Jinja Highway, Kampala and at Equatorial Mall, Bombo Road, Kampala.

== See also ==
- List of banks in Uganda
- Bank of Uganda
- Banking in Uganda
- Bank of India
- Economy of Uganda
