= Ingrid Munro =

Swedish businesswoman

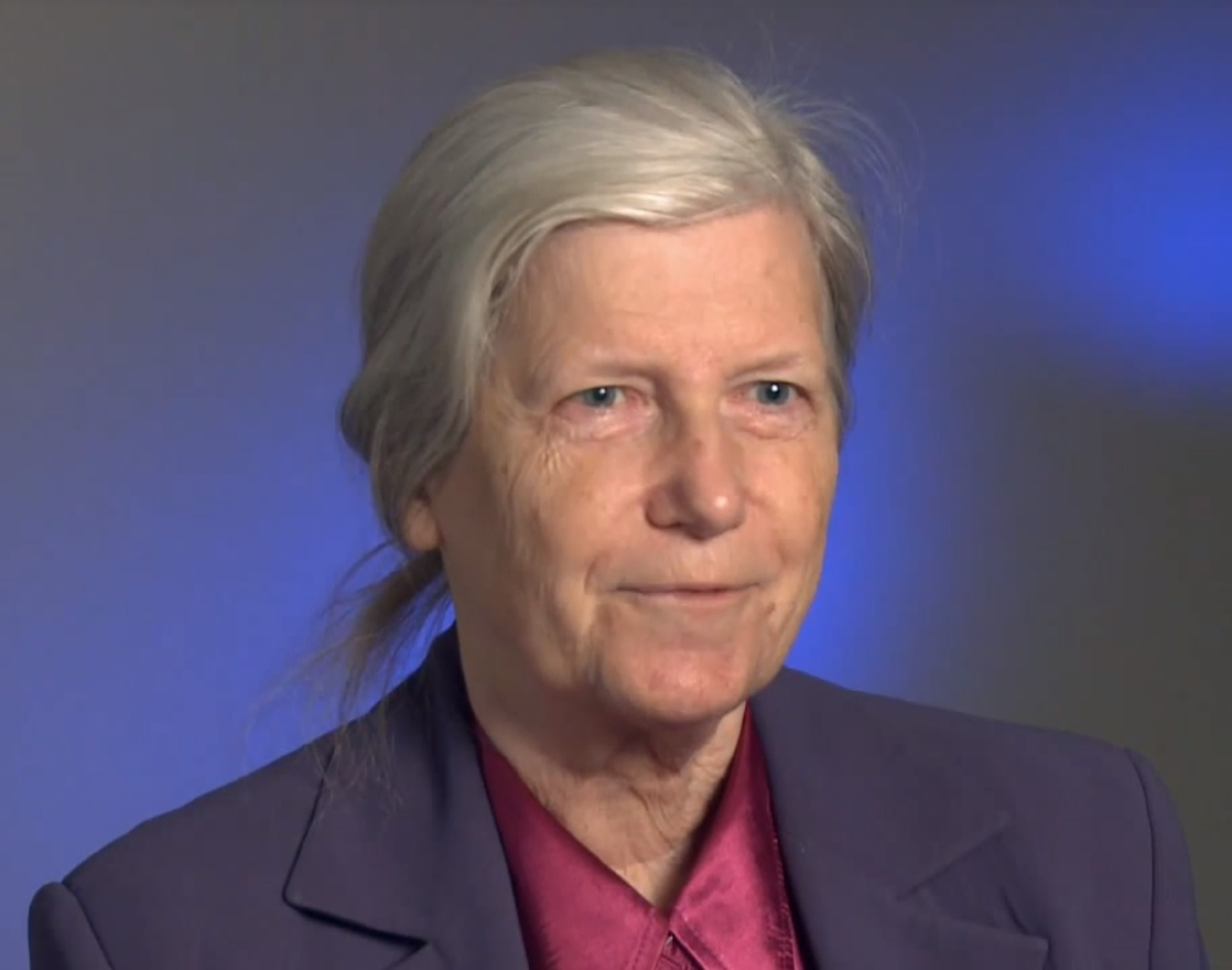
- Munro in 2011
- Born: Ingrid Mårtensson; 25 March 1941 (age 85); Norrköping, Sweden
- Other names: Ingrid Jussil, Ingrid Jussil-Årlin
- Education: Royal Institute of Technology
- Occupations: Architect, microfinance executive
- Known for: Founding Jamii Bora (1999)
- Spouse: Bob Munro

Ingrid Munro (née Mårtensson; born 25 March 1941) is a Swedish architect who founded and manages Jamii Bora, a microfinance organization based in Nairobi, Kenya.

== Life ==
Ingrid Mårtensson was born 25 March 1941 in Norrköping, Sweden. She trained as an architect and graduated at the Royal Institute of Technology in Stockholm in 1964. From 1979 to 1984 she headed the Swedish council of building research, a government agency. The United Nations proclaimed 1987 to be the "International year of shelter for the homeless" and Munro was appointed to convince governments to enact housing reforms. After her UN job a number of African governments offered her to lead the intergovernmental organisation African Housing Foundation, which she led from 1988 till 1999. She then began her career as an advocate for the poor in Kenya, pressing for their right to housing.

Her father was a missionary and medical doctor. She herself is a Christian, and has mustered the support of churches in Sweden, although Jamii Bora equally serves the Christians and Muslims living in Kenya.

In 1999, upon Munro's retirement, she founded Jamii Bora along with 50 women beggars, loaning them twice as much as they agreed to save. Munro said she came to know the women after she and her husband, the Canadian Bob Munro, adopted first one boy who had lived on the street, then his two brothers, beginning in 1988. The New Yorker quotes her as saying, "It was a small seven-year-old boy who more or less adopted us....And then we later found his two brothers and adopted them. With a situation like that, like in all great love stories, in literature and in real life, you are a helpless victim, you know?"

In 2012 Ingrid Munro was featured in the documentary Half the Sky: Turning Oppression into Opportunity for Women Worldwide premiering on PBS October 2012. The series introduces women and girls living under very difficult circumstances and bravely fighting to challenge them. The Half the Sky PBS TV series was produced by Show of Force along with Fugitive Films.
