= Co-operative Bank of Kenya =

Commercial bank in Kenya

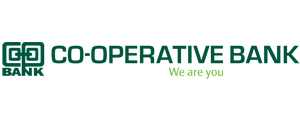

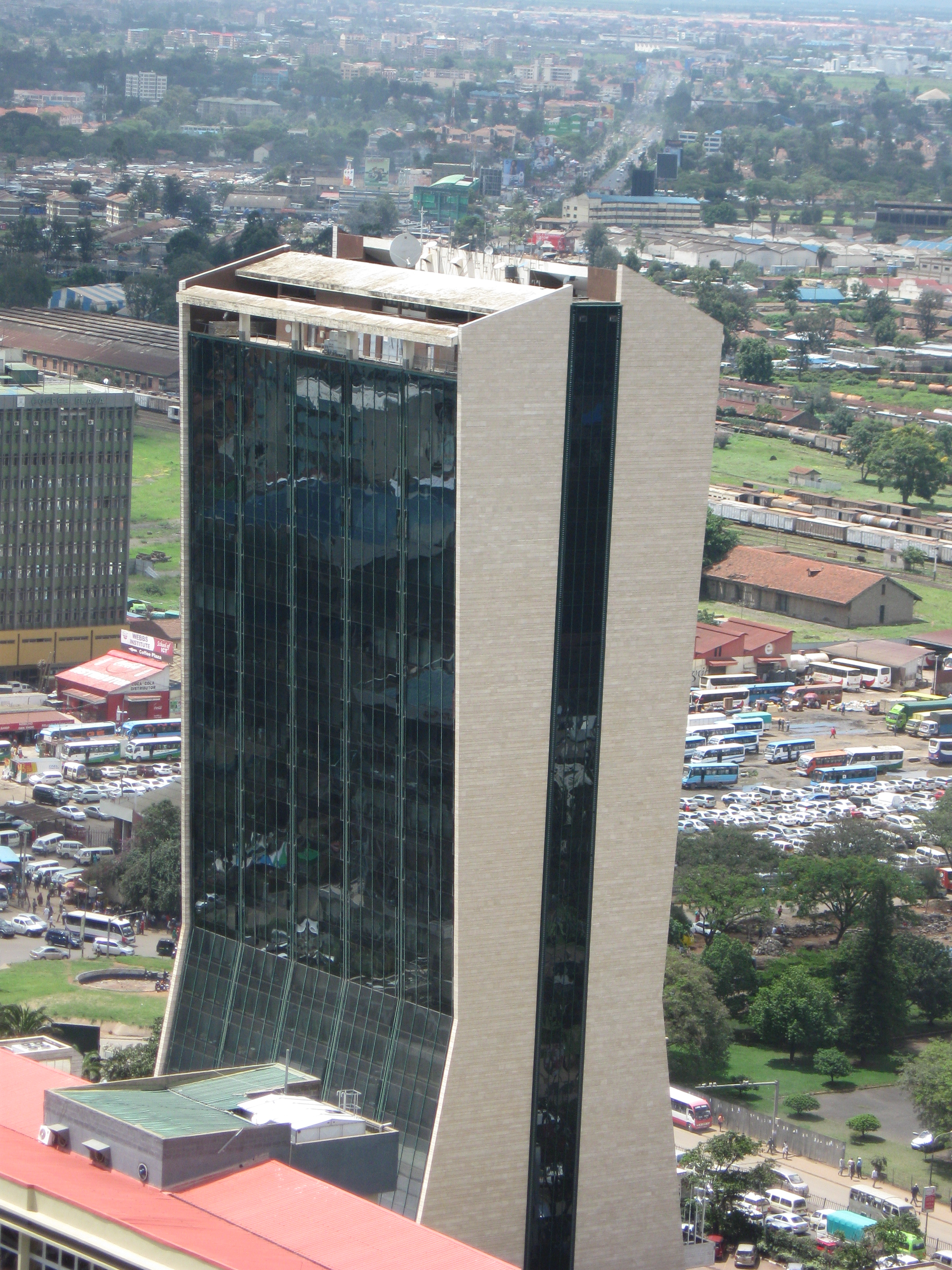
- headquarters in Nairobi
- Type: Public company
- Traded as: KN: COOP
- Industry: Financial services
- Founded: 1965
- Headquarters: Nairobi, Kenya
- Key people: John Murugu, OGW; Chairman; Dr. Gideon Muriuki, CBS; Group Managing Director & CEO
- Products: Loans, Checking, Savings, Investments, Debit Cards
- Revenue: US$684 million (KES:75.04 billion) (2021)
- Total assets: US$5.29 billion (KES:5.7977 billion) (2021)
- Number of employees: 4,000+ (2018)
- Website: www.co-opbank.co.ke

Co-operative Bank of Kenya is a commercial bank in Kenya, the largest economy in the East African Community. It is licensed by the Central Bank of Kenya, the central bank and national banking regulator. The bank has introduced Agency banking model and has a deep customer base in Kenya with over 7.5 million accounts as of December 2018. In 2010, the bank was awarded "Best Bank of Kenya" by the London Financial Times due to their excellent growth.

== Overview ==
The bank serves the banking needs of individuals, small businesses and large corporations, focusing on the needs of cooperative societies in Kenya. Cooperative Bank is a large financial services institution. Its total assets were valued at 404.15 billion KES (about US$4 billion). At 31 December 2013, its shareholders' equity was valued at approximately 36.8 billion shillings. As of May 2012, the bank controlled about 8.2% of all bank assets in Kenya.

== History ==
The bank was established in 1966, initially as a cooperative society. The banking license was granted in 1968. The Kenya Government directed all cooperative societies in the country to transfer their deposits to the Co-operative Bank of Kenya and that all cooperatives buy the bank's shares. In 1977, the bank opened its first subsidiary: Cooperative Finance Limited. In 1989, the bank converted to a fully fledged commercial bank and increased its products menu. In 1998 the bank's headquarters were relocated following destruction of the original premises by the bombing targeting the nearby Embassy of the United States of America. That same year, the bank became an agent of the money-transfer service company MoneyGram. In 2002, the bank's headquarters returned to Cooperative Bank House following renovations. In 2008, the bank listed on the Nairobi Securities Exchange, where its shares trade under the symbol: COOP.

In March 2020, the bank announced its plans to acquire Jamii Bora Bank. Co-operative Bank acquired Jamii Bora Bank and renamed it to Kingdom Bank Limited.

== Member companies ==
The companies that comprise Co-operative Bank Limited include, but are not limited, to the following:

- Kingdom Securities Limited – Nairobi, Kenya – 60% shareholding
- Co-opTrust Investment Services Limited – Nairobi, Kenya – 100% shareholding
- Co-operative Consultancy Services Kenya Limited – 100% shareholding
- CIC Insurance Group Limited – 35.71% shareholding
- Co-operative Bank of South Sudan – Juba, South Sudan
- Co-operative Bank Foundation – Nairobi, Kenya
- Co-operative Bank Ethiopia – Addis Ababa, Ethiopia – In development
- Co-operative Bank Uganda – Kampala, Uganda – In development.
- Kingdom Bank Limited (Kenya) (formerly Jamii Bora Bank) – Nairobi, Kenya (90percent shareholding)

== Ownership ==
The bank's stock is owned by the following corporate entities and individuals:

Cooperative Bank of Kenya Stock Ownership
Rank	Name of Owner	Percentage Ownership
1	CoopHoldings Cooperative Society Limited	65.0
2	Over 116,000 "Other" Investors	35.0
	Total	100.00

CoopHoldings Cooperative Society Limited is a holding company owned by the cooperative societies within Kenya, who jointly own a controlling majority of shares totalling 65% of all company stock. The remainder is owned by individual and institutional investors through the Nairobi Securities Exchange.

== Governance ==
The bank is governed by an eighteen-person board of directors. John Murugu, one of the non-executive directors, is the chairman. The managing director and chief executive officer is Gideon Maina Muriuki, MBS. He is assisted by seven other senior managers in supervising the day-to-day activities of the bank.

== See also ==
- CIC Insurance Group Limited
- List of banks in Kenya
- Central Bank of Kenya
- Economy of Kenya
