= CIC Insurance Group =

African insurance and investment group

CIC Insurance Group PLC
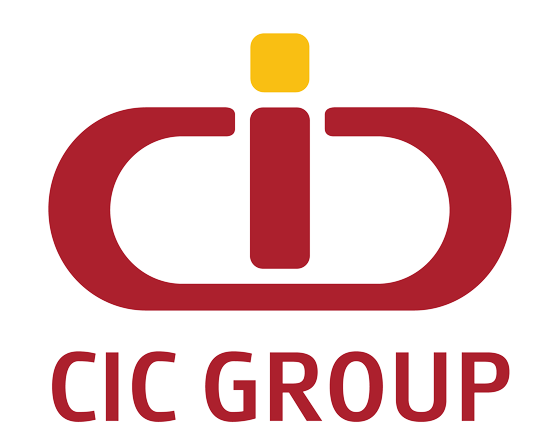
- Company type: Public company
- Traded as: KN: CIC
- Industry: Insurance, financial services
- Founded: 1968; 58 years ago
- Headquarters: Nairobi, Kenya
- Key people: Patrick Nyaga (Group CEO), Dr. Nelson Kuria (Group Chairman)
- Products: Insurance, investment services and REITs
- Revenue: ▲KES: 16.87 billion (2020)
- Total assets: ▲KES: 38.7 billion (2020)
- Website: cic.co.ke

CIC Insurance Group Limited, commonly referred to as CIC Group, is a Kenyan insurance and investment group that operates mainly in Kenya, Uganda, South Sudan and Malawi. CIC Group has a network of branches and operational subsidiaries spread across the 4 countries.

The group's headquarters are located in CIC Plaza, Mara Road, Upperhill in Nairobi, Kenya. CIC Insurance Group is leading Micro and Co-operative insurance provider in Kenya with its subsidiaries involved in fund, Reits and Asset Management, general insurance, medical insurance and life Assurance, pension and annuities. The Group expanded regionally to set its footprint in Uganda, South Sudan and Malawi in 2015.

== History ==
The Group's origins in Kenya date back to 1968 when it was a department within the Kenya National Federation of Co-operatives. In 1978, the department was registered and licensed as Co-operative Insurance Services Limited, a composite insurance company to write all classes of business with its target market, the cooperative movement.

In 1999, the company was changed to the Co-operative Insurance Company of Kenya Limited (CIC) and later to CIC Insurance Group Limited in 2010. This change was in preparation for the de-merger of its life and general business operations.

The Group made its debut on the Nairobi Securities Exchange (NSE) on 18 July 2012. This made it the 6th insurance company to be listed on the NSE and the 60th company to be listed on the NSE overall.

In 2014, CIC Group announced its intention to expand to Uganda, South Sudan, Tanzania, Rwanda and Malawi. In South Sudanese market, the Group plans to set up a greenfield operation in which it would hold 69 per cent of issued capital in a new local entity while the Cooperative Bank of South Sudan (a subsidiary of the Cooperative Bank of Kenya) would take up the remaining 31 per cent. This expansion would be pegged on the resolution of the South Sudanese Civil War. In Uganda, the Group aims to partner with the Uganda Cooperatives Savings and Credit Union to establish an insurance company in which CIC Insurance Group would own 40 per cent of the unit. CIC Group stated that in Malawi, it would start with a 70 per cent stake in a new subsidiary with the remaining being held by the Malawi Union of Savings and Credit Cooperative and the Farmers Union of Malawi (FUM).

According to the Insurance Regulatory Authority report released in September 2014, CIC Insurance was ranked third in market share with 9% of the market behind Jubilee Insurance and Britam, who controlled 11.9% and 11.2% respectively.

== Subsidiaries and associated companies ==
The companies that comprise the CIC Insurance Group Limited include, but are not limited, to the following:

1. CIC General Insurance Limited – Nairobi, Kenya – 100% Shareholding – The flagship company of the group. Offering general insurance.
2. CIC Life Assurance Limited – Nairobi, Kenya – 100% Shareholding – Offering life insurance.
3. CIC Asset Management Limited – Nairobi, Kenya – 100% Shareholding – Offering financial services, investment management, Investment advisory and REITs
4. CIC Africa Insurance (SS) Limited – Juba, South Sudan 69% Shareholding – Offering Insurance. (31% shareholding is by Co-op Bank South Sudan)
5. CIC Africa Insurance (Malawi) Limited – ??% Shareholding – Offering Insurance. (??% Malawi Union of Savings and Credit Cooperatives)
6. CIC Africa Insurance Uganda Limited – Kampala, Uganda – ??% Shareholding
7. Takaful Insurance of Africa Limited – Nairobi, Kenya - 24% Shareholding - Offering general insurance.

== Ownership ==
The shares of the CIC Insurance Group Limited are listed on the NSE, where it trades under the symbol CIC. As of 31 December 2013, the five largest shareholders in the Group's stock are depicted in the table below:

CIC Insurance Group Limited
Rank	Name of Owner	Percentage Ownership
1	Cooperative Bank of Kenya	35.71
2	Co-operative Bank Savings & Credit Society Ltd	9.63
3	K-Unity Savings & Credit Co-operative Society	3.21
4	Harambee Co-operative Savings & Credit Society ltd	1.81
5	Embu Farmers Savings & Credit Co-Operative Society	1.78
6	TR LOCKWOOD	46.00
	Total	100.00

== Governance ==
CIC Insurance Group Limited is governed by a twelve-person board of directors with Dr. Nelson Kuria serving as the Group Chairman and Patrick Nyaga as the Group CEO.

== See also ==
- Cooperative Bank of Kenya
- Nairobi Stock Exchange
- List of Insurance companies in Kenya
