= Association of African Central Banks =

International organization of central banks

The Association of African Central Banks is an international organization of central banks that promotes monetary, banking, and financial cooperation among its African member states.

== History ==
The concept of an Association of African Central Banks was first proposed on May 25, 1963, during the Summit Conference of African Heads of State and Government in Addis Ababa, Ethiopia. At this conference, the leaders unanimously agreed to establish a preparatory Economic Committee tasked with examining a wide array of monetary and financial issues, in collaboration with national governments and the Economic Commission for Africa (ECA).

Following this decision, the inaugural meeting of African Central Bank Governors took place in Addis Ababa from 15 to 22 February, 1965. The purpose of this meeting was to explore mechanisms for cooperation and to discuss the establishment of the Association's organs. Additionally, it was resolved to create sub-regional Committees, as defined by the ECA, comprising members or representatives from the Association.

The ECA organized two conferences, in 1966 and 1968, which led to the adoption of the Articles of the Association of African Central Banks. These Articles established the Association, as well as defined how it operates.

Currently, the Association includes an Assembly of Governors, which serves as its governing body, consisting of all the Governors of African Central Banks. It also features a Bureau made up of the chairperson and vice-chairperson of the Association, along with the chairpersons of the sub-regional Committees, as well as the sub-regional Committees themselves, which consist of the Governors from the five sub-regions defined by the African Union.

Moreover, the Governors agreed to establish a streamlined Secretariat, located in office space and facilities provided by the Headquarters of the Central Bank of West African States in Dakar, Senegal.

== Structure and members ==
The AACB comprises several key organs:

Assembly of Governors: This is the governing body of the AACB. It consists of all the Governors of African central banks.

Bureau: This includes the chairperson, Vice-chairperson, and chairpersons of the sub-regional Committees.

Sub-regional Committees: These committees represent the five African sub-regions (North, West, Central, East, and Southern Africa) and comprise the Governors from these sub-regions.

Secretariat: The AACB's Secretariat is headquartered at the Banque Centrale des Etats de l’Afrique de l’Ouest (BCEAO) in Dakar, Senegal, Its task is to provide administrative support and coordinate the organization's activities.

Current members include:

- Banco de Cabo-Verde (Cape Verde)
- Banco de Moçambique (Mozambique)
- Banco Nacional de Angola (Angola)
- Banco Nacional de Guinea Ecuatorial (Equatorial Guinea)
- Bank Al-Maghrib (Morocco)
- Bank of Botswana (Botswana)
- Bank of Ghana (Ghana)
- Bank of Mauritius (Mauritius)
- Bank of Namibia (Namibia)
- Bank of Sierra Leone (Sierra Leone)
- Bank of South Sudan (South Sudan)
- Bank of Tanzania (Tanzania)
- Bank of Uganda (Uganda)
- Banque Centrale de la République de Guinée (Guinea)
- Banque Centrale de Mauritanie (Mauritania)
- Banque Centrale de Tunisie (Tunisia)
- Banque Centrale des Comores (Comoros)
- Banque Centrale des États de l'Afrique de l'Ouest (BCEAO) (West African States)
- Banque Centrale du Congo (Democratic Republic of Congo)
- Banque Centrale du Djibouti (Djibouti)
- Banque d'Algérie (Algeria)
- Banque de la République du Burundi (Burundi)
- Banque des États de l'Afrique Centrale (BEAC) (Central African States)
- Central Bank of Egypt (Egypt)
- Central Bank of Kenya (Kenya)
- Central Bank of Lesotho (Lesotho)
- Central Bank of Libya (Libya)
- Central Bank of Nigeria (Nigeria)
- Central Bank of Seychelles (Seychelles)
- Central Bank of Somalia (Somalia)
- Central Bank of Sudan (Sudan)
- Central Bank of The Gambia (The Gambia)
- Eswatini Bank (Eswatini)
- National Bank of Ethiopia (Ethiopia)
- National Bank of Rwanda (Rwanda)
- Reserve Bank of Malawi (Malawi)
- Reserve Bank of Zimbabwe (Zimbabwe)
- South African Reserve Bank (South Africa)

In 2023, Governor Harvesh Kumar Seegolam of the Bank of Mauritius was unanimously elected to become the Chairperson AACB.

== Objectives ==
The AACB's primary objectives include the following:

- Promoting cooperation among member states and to support the development of the financial and banking sector
- Paving the path towards the establishment of an African Central Bank and single currency
- Enhancing the capacity building of African central banks through research, seminars, symposiums, and technical training

== See also ==
- List of central banks of Africa
- List of currencies in Africa
- African Monetary Union
- Economy of Africa
- Islamic banking and finance
- United Nations Economic Commission for Africa
