= Higlet =

- Location within Kenya
- Coordinates: 1.07°S 40.32°E
- Country: Kenya
- County: Garissa County
- Time zone: UTC+3 (EAT)

Higlet is a settlement in Garissa County, Kenya (1.213°S, 40.087°E), located 42 km northwest of Garissa town within the Tana River watershed. The community primarily consists of Somali-Kenyan clans engaged in nomadic livestock herding, with seasonal migration patterns tied to the Lagbogol and Tana seasonal rivers. The settlement features a primary school (Higlet DEB School, est. 1998) and solar-powered borehole. Its arid climate (Köppen BSh) supports Acacia-Commiphora bushland vegetation, though recurrent droughts have increased humanitarian interventions. Higlet serves as a local trading hub along the Garissa-Liboi livestock corridor, with weekly markets averaging 300 shoats traded.
