= Dardesa =

- Location within Kenya
- Coordinates: 0.93°S 40.9°E
- Country: Kenya
- County: Garissa County
- Time zone: UTC+3 (EAT)

Dardesa is a settlement in Garissa County, Kenya.
