= Ilkabere =

- Location within Kenya
- Coordinates: 0.96°S 41.05°E
- Country: Kenya
- County: Garissa County
- Time zone: UTC+3 (EAT)

Ilkabere is a settlement in Kenya's Garissa County. It is very close to the Somali border.
