= Sumat =

- Location within Kenya
- Coordinates: 1.1333°S 40.0666°E
- Country: Kenya
- County: Garissa County
- Time zone: UTC+3 (EAT)

Sumat is a settlement in Kenya's Garissa County.
