= Garissa Airport =

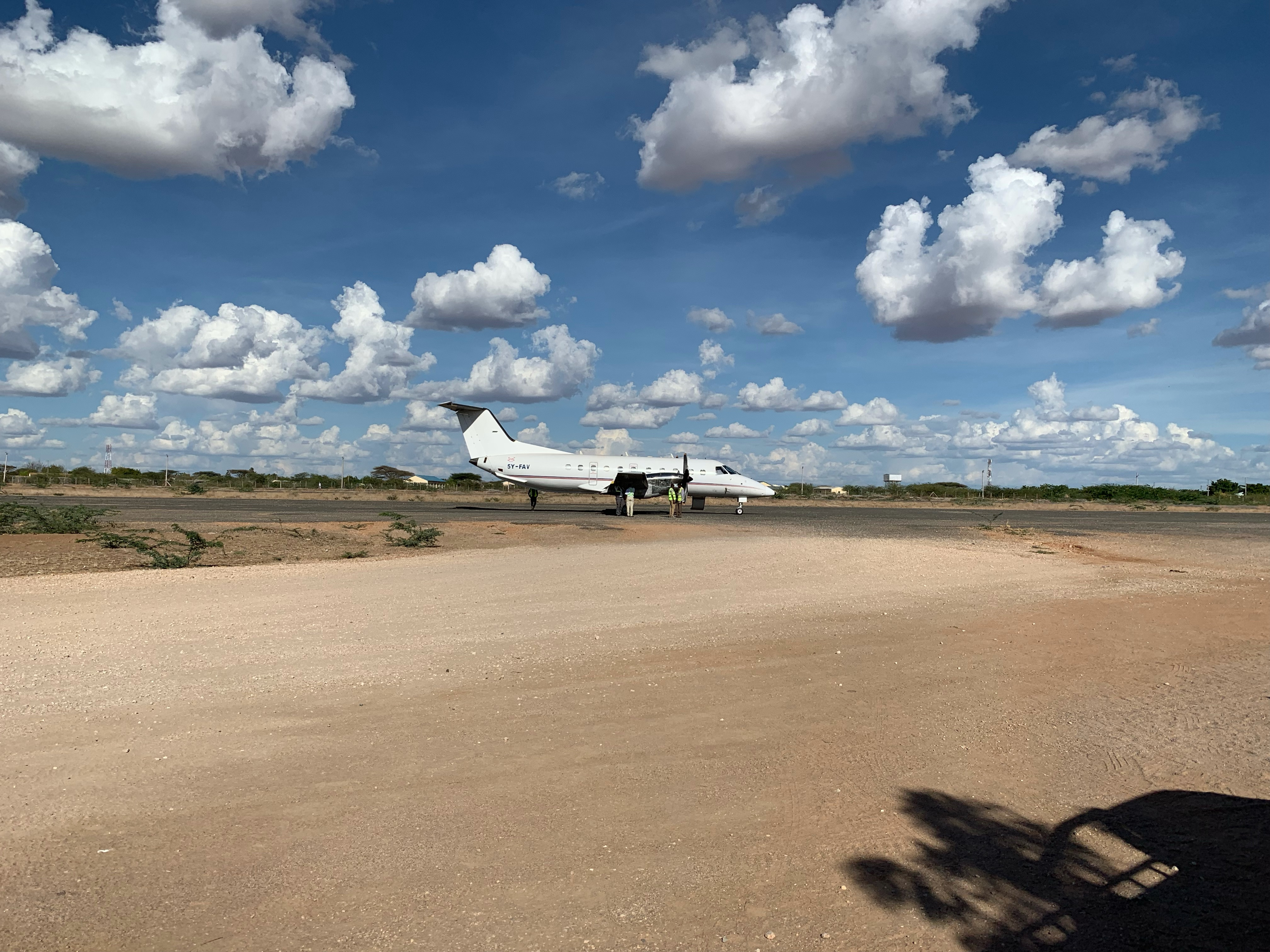
- IATA: GAS; ICAO: HKGA

Summary
- Airport type: Public, Civilian
- Owner: Kenya Airports Authority
- Serves: Garissa, Kenya
- Location: Garissa, Kenya
- Elevation AMSL: 476 ft / 145 m
- Coordinates: 00°28′07″S 39°38′58″E

Map
- Location of Garissa Airport in Kenya; Placement on map is approximate

Runways
| Direction | Length | | Surface |
| Direction | ft | m | Surface |
|---|---|---|---|
| 17-35 | 3,937 | 1,200 | Asphalt |

Garissa Airport is a modest domestic airport located near Garissa town in northeastern Kenya. It serves the local population and surrounding counties, primarily supporting government, humanitarian, and charter operations. The airport has a basic runway and minimal infrastructure, with limited scheduled passenger services. Its role is mainly strategic due to the region’s security and logistical needs.

== Location ==
Garissa Airport (IATA: GAS, ICAO: HKGA) is located in the town of Garissa, Garissa County, near the International border with Somalia.

Its location is approximately 315 kilometres (196 mi), by air, north of Nairobi International Airport, the country's largest civilian airport. The geographic coordinates of this airport are:0° 28' 7.00"N, 39° 38' 58.00"E (Latitude:-0.468610; Longitude:39.649445).

== Airlines and destinations ==
Garissa Airport is a small civilian airport, serving Garissa and surrounding communities. Situated at 145 metres (476 ft) above sea level, the airport has a single asphalt runway 17-35 that measures 3,937 feet (1,200 m) long.

| Airlines | Destinations |
|---|---|
| Freedom Airline | Nairobi–Wilson |
| Mrash Tours & Travel | Nairobi–Wilson |

== See also ==
- Kenya Airports Authority
- Kenya Civil Aviation Authority
- List of airports in Kenya
