= Kingdom Bank Limited (Kenya) =

Kenyan commercial bank

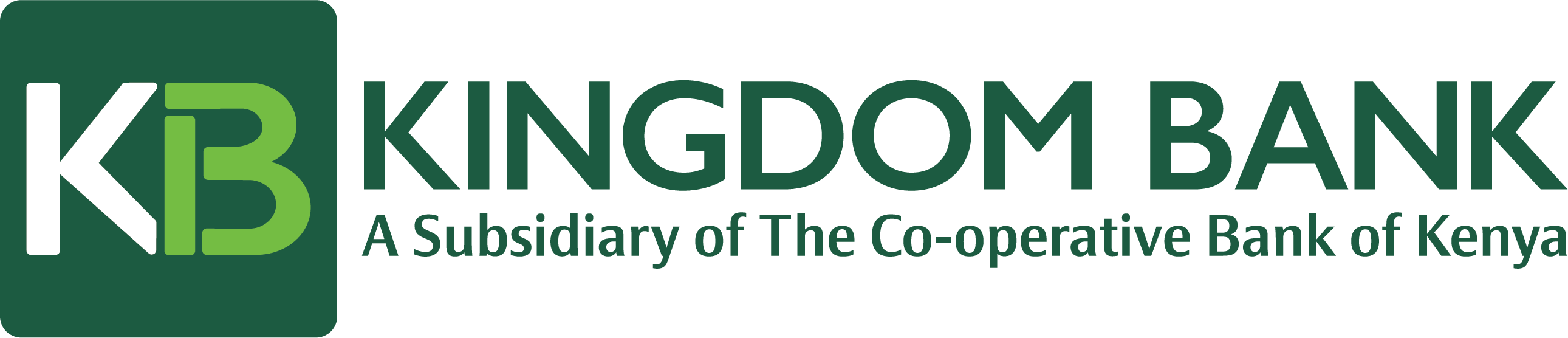
- Type: Subsidiary of Cooperative Bank of Kenya
- Industry: Financial services
- Founded: 22 November 1999; 26 years ago
- Headquarters: Nairobi, Kenya
- Key people: Margaret Karangatha (chairperson); Anthony Mburu (chief executive officer)
- Products: Loans, transaction accounts, savings, investments, debit cards
- Total assets: KES:53.07 billion (US$409.7 million) (June 2026)
- Website: https://www.kingdombankltd.co.ke/

Kingdom Bank Limited (Kenya), formerly Jamii Bora Bank, is a commercial bank in Kenya. It is one of the commercial banks licensed by the Central Bank of Kenya, the national banking regulator.

== Location ==
The headquarters of the bank are located at Kingdom Towers (formerly Jamii Bora Towers), along Argwings Kodhek Road, in Kilimani, Nairobi, approximately 6 kilometres (4 mi), by road, west of the city centre. The geographical coordinates of the bank's headquarters are:01°17'35.0"S, 36°47'23.0"E (Latitude:-1.293056; Longitude:36.789722).

== History ==
The bank was founded as a charitable trust by 50 destitute families on the streets of Nairobi, Kenya's capital and largest city. In March 2010, it merged with another financial institution with a banking license and transformed into a fully fledged commercial bank. In March 2010, Jamii Bora merged with City Finance Bank (CFB), a small private financial services provider which, in the past, had provided services to large corporations and high-net-worth individuals. In the merger, CFB acquired JBB and took on the name of its new acquisition. Other investors in the bank include Baraka Africa Fund (BAF), and other individual investors.

In March 2020, Co-operative Bank of Kenya, the country's fourth-largest commercial bank, with nearly 10 percent market share of national banking assets, proposed the acquisition of Jamii Bora Bank.

Kingdom Bank was finally acquired and is a subsidiary of the Co-operative Bank of Kenya since its acquisition in August 2020.

The bank has a network of 29 branches, and is expanding.

== Assets ==
In March 2018, the bank's total assets were valued at approximately KSh12.5 billion (US$117 million).

As of December 2023, the bank had total assets of Ksh 36.7 billion, profit before tax amounting to Ksh 1.08 billion, with interest income reaching Ksh 3.7 billion and non-interest income standing at Ksh 533.7 million.

== Ownership ==
Jamii Bora Bank is privately owned. A rights issue of US$4 to US$6 million was successfully executed in the 4th quarter of 2010. In November 2011, a new consortium known as Asterisk Holdings, invested KES:410 million (approx:US$4.6 million) in Jamii Bora Bank. Following the acquisition of 90 percent shareholding in the stock of the bank by Cooperative bank of Kenya, the bank ownership was as depicted in the table below, as of August 2020.

Kingdom Bank Limited (Kenya) stock ownership
Rank	Name of owner	Percentage ownership in 2012	Percentage ownership in 2020
1	Asterisk Holdings	20.08	2.01
2	ShoreCap II Limited	15.25	1.53
3	Jamii Bora Scandinavia AB	12.17	1.22
4	Catalyst JBB Holdings LLC	9.65	0.96
5	Nordic Micro Cap Investments	7.04	0.70
6	Cornerstone Enterprises Limited	4.69	0.47
7	ESOP	4.37	0.44
8	Other investors	26.75	2.68
9	Cooperative Bank of Kenya	0.00	90.00
	Total	100.00	100.00

== Acquisition ==
In March 2020, Co-operative Bank of Kenya, the fourth-largest commercial bank in the country, began the process of acquiring 100 percent shareholding in Jamii Bora Bank. The process required regulatory approvals. On 7 August 2020, Cooperative Bank received all the necessary regulatory approvals to acquire 90 percent shareholding in Jami Bora Bank. On 25 August 2020, the bank re-branded to Kingdom Bank Kenya Limited.

== Branches ==
As of February 2026, the bank maintained a network of branches at the following locations:

1. Bungoma Branch: Yogi Building, Moi Avenue Road, Bungoma
2. Eldoret Branch: Corner House, Kenyatta Street, Eldoret
3. Embu Branch: Njue Plaza, Embu-Nairobi Highway, Embu
4. Gikomba Branch: Kombo Munyiri Road, Nairobi
5. Industrial Area Branch: Lunga Lunga Square, Along Lunga Lunga Rd. Nairobi
6. Kariobangi Branch: Marphic Ark Hotel, Kariobangi, Nairobi
7. Kawangware Branch: Mbugua Plaza Junction, Kawangware, Nairobi
8. Kayole Branch: Pinnacle Centre, Spine Road, Kayole, Nairobi
9. Kiambu Branch: Githunguri Nyakinywa Women Group Building, Kiambu
10. Kikuyu Branch: Red Brick House, Kikuyu
11. Kilimani Branch: Kingdom Bank Towers, Argwings Kodhek Road, Nairobi
12. Kisii Branch: Mocha Place, Kisii-Kisumu Road, Kisii
13. Kisumu Branch: Jubilee House, Oginga Odinga and Angawa Street, Kisumu
14. Kitale Branch: GH Tanna Building, Kenyatta Street, Kitale
15. Kitengela Branch: Newton House, Kitengela
16. Kirinyaga Road Branch: Bits House, River Road, Nairobi
17. Koinange Branch: Winsor House, Muindi Mbingu Street, Nairobi
18. Machakos Branch: Kingdom Bank Building, Mbolu Malu Road, Machakos
19. Meru Branch: Ntima Building, Tom Mboya Street, Meru
20. Mombasa Branch: Khamisi Building, Moi Avenue, Mombasa
21. Mtwapa Branch: Malindi Highway, Mtwapa Bridge, Mzambarauni, Mtwapa
22. Naivasha Branch: KEI Plaza, Biashara Rd, Naivasha
23. Nakuru Branch: Light House, Kenyatta Avenue, Nakuru
24. Nyeri Branch: Frontline Building, Gakere Road, Nyeri
25. Ongata Rongai Branch: Brisma Towers, Ongata Rongai, Nairobi
26. Thika Branch: Kenyatta Avenue, Thika
27. Tom Mboya Branch: Nature House, Tom Moya Street, Nairobi
28. Utawala Branch: Mashariki Mall, Utawala, Nairobi
29. Wangige Branch: Wangige Shopping Centre, Walokana Petrol Station, Kiambu County

== Subsidiaries ==
Kingdom Bank has the following subsidiaries:

- Kingdom Bancassurance Intermediary Limited (Formerly Jamii Bora Insurance Agency Limited)
- Kingdom Leasing Limited (Formerly Jamii Bora Leasing Limited)

== Governance ==
The five-person board of directors is chaired by Margaret Karangatha. Other board members are Gideon Muriuki, the Cooperative Bank Group managing director, Macloud Malonza, Julius Sitienei and Anthony Mburu, the Kingdom Bank CEO.

== See also ==
- List of banks in Kenya
- Central Bank of Kenya
- Economy of Kenya
