= Bour-Algi Giraffe Sanctuary =

Nature reserve in Kenya

The Bour-Algi Giraffe Sanctuary is a community-based conservation and natural resource management initiative. The sanctuary is located in Garissa County, Kenya, in the area surrounding the village of Bour-Algi, 5 km (3.1 mi) south of Garissa town. The sanctuary covers an area of around 125 km^{2} (48 sq mi) and borders the Tana River to the south-west. Its name stems from the large presence of giraffes attracted by the abundant acacia trees. Estimates state almost 1000 giraffes living in the outskirts of the Bour-Algi village.

== History ==
In 1995, a group of volunteers from the Bour-Algi village initiated a self-help group to protect and preserve the wildlife present in the area. They embarked on various activities, including regular wildlife patrols and desnaring sweeps. As more and more villagers joined the conservation effort, the group’s action expanded to cover a broader area. In 2000, the local authorities of the Garissa District recognized the area as a giraffe sanctuary and began supporting the community’s activities. The Kenya Wildlife Service followed suit and appointed an Honorary Warden to support the initiative.

With support of Terra Nuova and the Arid Lands Resource Management Project (ALRMP), the community has been seeking formal status for its conservancy.

== Wildlife ==
The most common herbivores in the sanctuary are giraffe and gerenuk. Other herbivores sighted in the area are Kirk's dik-dik, Lesser Kudu, warthog and waterbuck, albeit very rare.
