= Duncan Ndegwa =

Kenyan civil servant

Duncan Nderitu Ndegwa (born 11 March 1925) is the first post-independence Head of Civil Service and Secretary to the Cabinet in Kenya. He was also the first African and longest serving Governor of the Central Bank of Kenya.

== Early life ==
Ndegwa was born on 11 March 1925 in Nyeri County. He attended Alliance High School in Kikuyu, Makerere University College in Uganda and University of St. Andrews, Scotland.

== Work ==
Ndegwa joined the public service in 1956 as an Economist/Statistician and was appointed Permanent Secretary, Secretary to the Cabinet and Head of the Public Service in 1963 where he served until he was appointed Governor of the Central Bank of Kenya in 1967. As the first head of the civil service, Ndegwa was at the heart of the Africanisation programme whose aim was to build an African capitalist class in industry and commerce. The two sectors had been dominated by Europeans and Asians before Kenya's independence. Ndegwa served as Governor of the Central Bank until 1982.

In December 1972, Jeremy Morse who had been elected first chairman of the Committee of 20 charged with drafting the technical structure for the forthcoming IMF reforms, asked Ndegwa and three other international financial experts to serve as his deputies. Ndegwa however informed Morse by cable gram that he would not be able to serve.

== Business ==
Ndegwa was one of the top 10 shareholders of NIC Bank Group. He was the Chairman of the Mombasa Continental Resort.

== Memoirs ==
Ndegwa released his memoirs Walking in Kenyatta Struggles: My Story in December 2006.

== Later life ==
Ndegwa released four books in 2021. He was involved in a lawsuit with L.G Engineering Company where he claimed they trespassed on his land and cut his trees down which he won. In 2023 the Mombasa golf club held a golf tournament in his honor

== Awards ==
- Elder of the Order of the Golden Heart of Kenya (EGH) Presidential Award

Secretary
