= Bahadale =

- Location within Kenya
- Coordinates: 0.04°S 39.07°E
- Country: Kenya
- County: Garissa County
- Time zone: UTC+3 (EAT)

Bahadale is a settlement on the Tana River in Rahole National Reserve in Kenya's Garissa County.
