= Haridfi =

- Location within Kenya
- Coordinates: 0.58°S 40.82°E
- Country: Kenya
- County: Garissa County
- Time zone: UTC+3 (EAT)

Haridfi is a settlement in Garissa County, Kenya.
