= Igria =

- Location within Kenya
- Coordinates: 1.1°S 40.85°E
- Country: Kenya
- County: Garissa County
- Time zone: UTC+3 (EAT)

Igria is a settlement in Kenya's Garissa County.
