= Gulf African Bank =

- Company type: Private
- Industry: Banking
- Founded: 2008
- Headquarters: Nairobi, Kenya
- Key people: Abdalla Abdulkhalik (chief executive officer & board member
- Revenue: ▲Aftertax: US$3,902, 912 million (KES:402 million) (2014)
- Total assets: US$212.805, 271 million (KES:21.918,943 billion) (2014)
- Website: www.gulfafricanbank.com

Gulf African Bank (GAB), whose full name is Gulf African Bank Limited, is a commercial bank in Kenya operating under an Islamic banking regime. It is licensed by the Central Bank of Kenya, the central bank and national banking regulator.

As of December 2014 the bank was a mid-sized financial services provider in Kenya. Its total assets were valued at approximately US$191.8 million (KES:19, 753, 647 billion), with customer deposits totalling approximately US$153.3 million (KES:15.8 billion), and shareholders' equity estimated at US$30.6 million (KES:3.15 billion). At that time, the bank was ranked number 25, by assets, out of the 43 licensed banks in Kenya then. The bank has plans to enter Uganda and Tanzania.

== History ==
Discussions to establish the bank started in 2005, by individuals and institutions from the Persian Gulf and Kenya. The bank began banking operations in 2008, after receiving a commercial banking license and authorisation to establish a Sharia bank, from the Central Bank of Kenya. Gulf African Bank is the second commercial bank in Kenya to receive authorisation to practice Sharia banking, after First Community Bank, which opened in 2007. At the time it opened, Gulf African Bank's capital base totalled over US$21 million (KES:1.75 billion).

== Ownership ==
The shares of stock in Gulf African Bank are privately held by institutional and private investors from the Persian Gulf, Kenya and the United States of America. Institutional investors account for over 90% shareholding. The major shareholders in the bank include the investors listed in the table below. In September 2012, the International Finance Corporation acquired 16% shareholding in the bank for US$5 million. It is not clear how the shareholding will look after the money changes hands.

Gulf African Bank Stock Ownership

Rank	Name of Owner	Percentage Ownership
1	Istithmar PJS of United Arab Emirates – A Private Equity Firm	32.0
2	BMI Bank of Bahrain	21.3
3	Sheikh Abdallah Mohammed Al Romaizan of Saudi Arabia – An Individual	21.3
4	GulfCap Group of United Arab Emirates – A Private Investment Company	10.3
5	PTA Bank of Eastern and Southern Africa – A Multinational Development Bank	5.3
6	International Finance Corporation (IFC), An affiliate of the World Bank	16.0
7	Other Individual Investors from Kenya and the Persian Gulf	9.8
	Total	100.00

- The totals are off because shareholding data after IFC investment is lacking.

== Branch network ==
As of August 2014, the bank operates a network of branches at the following locations:

1. Head Office – Geminia Insurance Plaza, Kilimanjaro Avenue, Nairobi
2. Lamu Branch – Old Telkom Office, Jomo Kenyatta Road, Lamu
3. Kenyatta Avenue Branch – Ground Floor, Hughes Building, Kenyatta Avenue, Nairobi
4. Eastleigh Branch II – Shariff Centre Building, Jam Street, Eastleigh, Nairobi
5. Bombolulu Branch – Madina Estate, New Mombasa-Malindi Highway, Bombolulu, Mombasa
6. Westlands Branch – 9 West Building, Westlands, Nairobi]
7. Enterprise Branch – Addis Ababa Road, Off Enterprise Road, Nairobi
8. Upper Hill Branch – Ground Floor, Geminia Ins. Plaza, Kilimanjaro Ave., Upper Hill, Nairobi
9. Jomo Kenyatta Branch – Kasa Building, Jomo Kenyatta Avenue, Mombasa
10. Malindi Branch – Blue Marlin Building, Lamu Road, Malindi
11. Garissa Branch – First House, Al-Waqf Quran House, Kismayu Road, Garissa
12. Nkrumah Road Branch – Najat House, Nkrumah Road, Mombasa
13. Eastleigh Main Branch – Eastleigh Mall Building, General Wariunge Street, Eastleigh, Nairobi
14. Bondeni Branch – Abdel Nasser Road, Bondeni, Mombasa

== See also ==
- CBK
- Kenya Banks
- Kenya Economy
- Sharia Banking
- First Community Bank
