= Commission on Revenue Allocation =

The Commission on Revenue Allocation is a Kenya government Commission established under Article 215 and 216 of the Constitution of Kenya.

== Role ==
Its key role is recommendation of the basis for equitable sharing of revenues raised nationally between the National and the County Governments as well as sharing of revenue among the County Governments.

== Membership ==
The current membership of the Commission is as follows:

- Micah Cheserem - Chairman
- Fatuma Abdulkadir - Vice-chairperson
- Prof. Wafula Massai
- Amina Ahmed
- Prof. Joseph Kimura
- Rose Osoro
- Prof. Raphael Munavu
- Meshack Onyango
- Joseph Kinyua (Permanent Secretary Treasury)

== Notable Recommendations ==
The commission recommended the following formula for sharing the resources among the county governments

- Population – 45%
- Basic equal share – 25%
- Poverty index – 20%
- Land area – 8%
- Fiscal responsibility – 2%
