= Kamau Thugge =

Governor of the Central Bank of Kenya

- Born: August 1, 1957 (age 69); Nyeri, Kenya
- Education: Colorado College; Johns Hopkins University
- Occupations: Economist, banker
- Years active: 1985 — present
- Known for: Fiscal discipline
- Title: Governor; Central Bank of Kenya

Kamau Thugge (born 1st August, 1957) is a Kenyan economist, banker, and the tenth and current governor of the Central Bank of Kenya. He assumed office on 19 June 2023.

== Background and education ==
Thugge was born in Nyeri, Kenya, in 1957. He studied in Kenya for his pre-university education. He holds a Bachelor of Arts degree from Colorado College. He obtained his Master of Arts and Doctor of Philosophy degrees in economics from Johns Hopkins University in the United States.

== Career ==
=== International Monetary Fund ===
Out of graduate school, Thugge began a career at the International Monetary Fund (IMF), that spanned 20 years. While there, he was reportedly responsible for designing policies for dealing with the unsustainable debt of developing countries, a process referred to as the Heavily Indebted Poor Countries Initiative (HIPC). For some time, during and following the 2008 financial crisis, he served as the Chief of Mission to Botswana and Lesotho.

=== Government of Kenya ===
Following his employment with the IMF, he was hired by the Kenyan government, serving in the Ministry of Finance in various roles, including as the Director of Fiscal and Monetary Affairs, as Economic Secretary and as Senior Economic Advisor. He also served as Principal Secretary at the Finance Ministry and as Senior Advisor to the President of Kenya.

=== Central Bank of Kenya ===
During the confirmation process as Governor of the Central Bank of Kenya, Dr. Thugge proposed the establishment of a government infrastructure bond in United States dollars, set up locally and open to Kenyan citizens and regional nationals. This came in the wake of dollar scarcity in Kenya and the high interest rates demanded by issuers of Eurobonds outside of Kenya. His views directly contrasted with those of his predecessor Patrick Njoroge.

In October 2023, while responding to questions from a parliamentary committee on finance and national planning, Dr. Thugge said the decline in international reserves was caused by an overvaluation of the shilling against the dollar This was against the backdrop of a gradual reduction in import cover from 5.5 months to 3.7 months. He cited data from the Bretton Woods Institutions (IMF & World Bank) which put the overvaluation of the shilling in the range of 20-25 percent. According to Dr. Thugge, the attempt to artificially maintain a strong exchange rate has come at the cost of losing vital international reserves.

== See also ==
- Governor of the Central Bank of Kenya
