= National Social Security Fund (Kenya) =

- Type: Quasi-Government
- Industry: Social Security
- Founded: 1965
- Headquarters: NSSF Building, Bishops Road, Nairobi, Kenya
- Key people: Dr. Anthony Omerikwa (Acting Chief Executive Officer/Managing Trustee), Francis Atwoli (Trustee)
- Products: Pension fund
- Revenue: ▲KSh.95 billion/= (2024)
- Total assets: ▲KSh 402.17 billion (2024)
- Website: www.nssf.or.ke

The National Social Security Fund is a Kenyan government agency responsible for the collection, safekeeping, responsible investment and distribution of retirement funds of employees in both the formal and informal sectors of the Kenyan Economy. Participation for both employers and employees is compulsory. The fund is both a pension fund and provident fund.

== History ==
The National Social Security Fund was established in 1965 through the Act of Parliament Cap 258 of the Laws of Kenya. It initially operated as a Department of the Ministry of Labour until 1987 when the act was amended, transforming the fund into a state corporation under the management of a board of trustees. Under the National Social Security Fund Act of 2013, both employed and the self-employed and their dependents qualify as contributing members. The Act on pension requires all Kenyans that are above 18 years of age to register to the program.

The board of trustees is composed of workers' representatives through the Central Organization of Trade Unions, employers through the Federation of Kenya Employers and the Government of Kenya through the Ministries of Labour and Finance. This composition ensures that the board accommodates the views and aspirations of the three social partners in policy formulation and running of the organization.

== Investment portfolio ==
The current National Social Security Fund investment portfolio includes fixed income, real estate, and equities.

=== Fixed income ===
This includes short term and long term bonds. As of 31 December 2010, the investment in long term bonds was KSh.24.64 billion/=.

=== Real estate ===
- Land - as of 31 December 2010, the undeveloped land owned by the fund was valued at KSh.7.86 billion/=.
- Buildings - as of 31 December 2010, the buildings owned by the fund were valued at KSh.31 billion/=.
  - Commercial buildings - these include the NSSF Building, View Park Towers, and Hazina Trade Centre which is set to be the tallest building in the region.
  - Residential buildings - These include Nyayo Estate Embakasi, Milimani Flats, Mountain View Estate, Hazina Estate and Nyayo Highrise Estate near Kibera.

=== Equities ===
- Private equities - the main private equity held by the fund is 11.2% of the issues share capital of the Consolidated Bank of Kenya. Others include the Nairobi City Council Stock.
- Listed equities - the fund is a leading investor on the Nairobi Securities Exchange, including in the following companies:

Number	Investment	Industry
1	Kenya Power and Lighting Company	Electricity Distribution
2	East African Breweries	Brewing
3	British American Tobacco Kenya	Tobacco & Cigarettes
4	Kenya Electricity Generating Company	Electricity Generation
5	Bamburi Cement	Construction Products
6	East Africa Portland Cement	Construction Products
7	Kenya Commercial Bank Group	Financial and Banking
8	Housing Finance Company of Kenya	Financial, Banking and Mortgages
9	Sameer Africa	Tyre Manufacturing
10	National Bank of Kenya	Financial and Banking
11	Barclays Bank (Kenya)	Financial and Banking
12	Standard Chartered Kenya	Financial and Banking
13	Nation Media Group	Media
14	Athi River Mining	Construction Products
15	Kenya Re-Insurance	Reinsurance
16	Safaricom	telecommunications
17	Equity Group Holdings Limited	Financial and Banking

== Ownership ==
The fund is owned by the Government of Kenya on behalf of the workers and employers in Kenya.

== Governance ==
Governance is overseen by a nine-member board of trustees with Dr. Anthony Omerikwa as the acting managing trustee. In formulating the fund’s policies the board of trustees acts strictly in accordance with the NSSF Act.

== Branch network ==
There are fund offices in major towns all over Kenya.

== See also ==
- National Social Security Fund (Uganda)
- National Social Security Fund (Tanzania)
- List of tallest buildings in Nairobi
- Nairobi Securities Exchange
