= Micah Cheserem =

Kenyan banker

Micah Cheserem is a Kenyan banker and a former chairman of the CRA Commission on Revenue Allocation. He previously worked as a Governor of the Central Bank of Kenya and Chairman of Kenya's Capital Markets Authority.

== Bibliography ==
The will to succeed: an autobiography (ISBN 9966225404)

== See also ==
- Central Bank of Kenya
- Commission on Revenue Allocation
