= Patrick Njoroge =

Kenyan economist (born c. 1961)

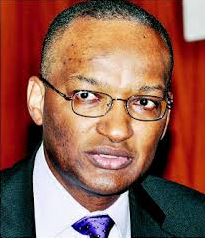
- Born: Patrick Ngugi Njoroge; 1961 (age 64–65); Muranga, Kenya
- Education: University of Nairobi; Yale University
- Occupation: Economist
- Years active: 1985 — present
- Known for: Fiscal discipline
- Title: Governor; Central Bank of Kenya
- Relatives: Anthony Muheria (brother)

Patrick Ngūgì Njoroge is a Kenyan economist, banker and the ninth governor of the Central Bank of Kenya.

== Background and education ==
Njoroge was born in Murang’a, Kenya, c. 1961. His father was an official in the education department and his mother was a teacher. Njoroge credits his parents involvement in education with inspiring his passion for learning.

Njoroge attended Mangu High School from 1973 until 1976, for his O-Level education. From 1977 until 1978, he attended Strathmore College for his A-Level studies. He entered the University of Nairobi in 1979, graduating with a Bachelor of Arts in Economics in 1983 and a Master of Arts in Economics in 1985.

From 1987 until 1993, he studied at Yale University, graduating with a Doctor of Philosophy in economics. While at Yale, Njoroge studied under professors such as William Brainard, Jim Tobin, and Robert J. Shiller.

== Career ==
Following his master's degree, he worked in Nairobi as a planning officer at the Kenyan Ministry of Planning from October 1985 until August 1987. Following his PhD studies, he worked as an economist at the Kenyan Ministry of Finance from March 1993 until December 1994.

From April 1995 until October 2005, he worked at the International Monetary Fund (IMF) in Washington, D. C., first as an economist and later as a senior economist. From November 2005 until December 2006, he served as the IMF mission chief for Dominica. He then served as the deputy division chief, Finance Department, at the IMF, from December 2006 until December 2012, based in Washington, D. C. from December 2012 until June 2015, he served as advisor to the deputy managing director of the IMF.

=== Central Bank of Kenya (CBK) ===
He was nominated to be the governor of the Central Bank of Kenya by Uhuru Kenyatta, the president of Kenya, on 2 June 2015. After vetting by the parliamentary committee on Finance, Trade and Planning on 17 June 2015, he was approved by the parliament of Kenya on 18 June 2015. He assumed office effective 19 June 2015 where he served for eight years until 19 June 2023 when he was succeeded by Dr. Kamau Thugge.

On 13 October 2015 the Central Bank of Kenya under his leadership placed Imperial Bank into receivership. In November 2018, United Nations Secretary General António Guterres appointed Njoroge to the United Nations Task Force on Digital Financing of Sustainable Development Goals, co-chaired by Maria Ramos and Achim Steiner.

Under his leadership, the CBK issued direct benefit payments to help financially suffering Kenyans amid the COVID-19 pandemic. Njoroge has stated that the financial technology industry (FinTech) has been a boon for financial inclusion of the general population.

== Other activities ==
- International Monetary Fund (IMF), Ex-Officio Member of the Board of Governors
- Financial Stability Board (FSB), Member of the Regional Consultative Group for Sub-Saharan Africa

== Personal life ==
Njoroge is of the Roman Catholic faith and a numerary member of Opus Dei. He is also the brother of Anthony Muheria the Archbishop of Roman Catholic Archdiocese of Nyeri.

== See also ==
- Governor of the Central Bank of Kenya
- List of banks in Kenya
- Economy of Kenya
- Kenyan shilling
