= Eric Kotut =

Kenyan businessman

Eric Kotut is a Kenyan businessman who was the fourth Central Bank governor, holding office from 1988 to 1993.

He was appointed to the position because of his father's relationship with the then president of Kenya, Daniel arap Moi, as they went to the same church.

He presided over the Goldenberg scandal that cost Kenya more than 10% of its annual GDP. He succeeded in having his name struck out of the Bosire Report on the Goldenberg scandal by the High Court of Kenya in 2008.
