= Jamii Bora =

Kenyan microfinance organization

Jamii Bora, which means "good families" in Swahili, is a Nairobi, Kenya based microfinance organization. As of 2007, it was the largest microfinance institution in Kenya. It was started by Ingrid Munro in 1999.
