= Premier Bank Kenya =

Premier Bank Limited
- Type: Private
- Industry: Financial services
- Founded: 2007
- Headquarters: Nairobi, Kenya
- Key people: Sheikh Mohamed Mbaye; Chairman; Hussein Hassan; Chief Executive Officer
- Products: Checking, savings, financing, investments, debit cards
- Revenue: ▲Aftertax:US$1.518 million (KES:131.202 million) (2013)
- Total assets: US$130.85 million (KES:11.305 billion) (2013)
- Number of employees: 605
- Parent: Premier Bank
- Website: www.firstcommunitybank.co.ke

Logo of Premier Bank Kenya

Premier Bank, formally First Community Bank (FCB), is a Shari'ah compliant commercial bank in Kenya, the largest economy in the East African Community. The bank received a formal approval from the Central Bank of Kenya in 2007, the national banking regulator in the country but commenced its official operations on 1 June 2008.

== Overview ==
As of December 2019, the bank's total assets were valued at about US$187.62 million (KES:18.762 billion), with shareholders' equity of about US$14 million (KES:1.46 billion), and customer deposits of US$161 million (KES:16.126 billion). At that time, the bank was ranked number 21, by assets, out of 43 licensed banks in Kenya then.

== History ==
Premier Bank was established in 2007 as First Community Bank (FCB) to operate according to Islamic Shari'ah law by private Muslim investors in Kuwait, Kenya and Tanzania. The bank received a Kenyan commercial banking license the same year, and officially started operations in June 2008. The FCB is the first Kenya-based fully fledged bank to operate according to the laws of Shari'ah. Since the founding of First Community Bank, other Sharia compliant banks such as Gulf African Bank (GAB), Dubai Islamic Bank (DIB) and several Islamic windows operating under conversational banks have also received commercial licenses from the Central Bank of Kenya.

== Subsidiaries ==
The bank's first subsidiary is FCB Takful Insurance Broker, in which it maintains 100% shareholding. The insurance brokerage was established in 2010. The bank also owns a second subsidiary, FCB Capital Limited, the first Sharia-compliant Investment capital in Kenya, wholly owned by First Community Bank.

== Branch network ==
As of March 2020, the bank maintains a network of branches at the following locations:

1. Wabera Street Branch - Prudential Assurance Building, 1st Floor, Wing B, Wabera Street, Nairobi
2. Eastleigh Branch I - United Textile Centre, 1st Floor, First Avenue, Eastleigh, Nairobi
3. Eastleigh Branch II - General Warungu Street, Opposite Kilimanjaro Food Court, Eastleigh, Nairobi
4. Industrial Area Branch - Enterprise Road, Volvo Showroom, Nairobi
5. Kimathi Branch - Jamia plaza, Kimathi street Jamia Mosque, Nairobi
6. Westlands Branch - Mpaka Plaza, Mpaka Road, Westlands, Nairobi
7. South C Branch - South C Shopping Center, Muhoho Avenue, Nairobi
8. Garissa Branch - Bajweed Building, Off Kismayu Road, Garissa
9. Lunga Lunga Branch - Lunga Lunga Business Centre, 1st Floor, Lunga Lunga Road, Nairobi
10. Kisumu Branch - Wedco Centre, Oginga Odinga Road, Kisumu
11. Nakuru Branch - Merika Building, Ground Floor, Kenyatta avenue, Nakuru
12. Malindi Branch - Malindi Shopping Complex, Lamu Road, Malindi
13. Mombasa Branch I - Shah Mansion Building, Digo Road, Mombasa
14. Mombasa Branch II - Imara Building, Digo Road, Mombasa
15. Moyale Branch - Shariff Guest House, Moyale
16. Wajir Branch - Wajir Town, Garissa Mandera Road next to Kilimanjaro Hotel, Wajir
17. Head Office, Mihrab Branch - FCB Mihrab Building, Lenana Road/Ring Road Kilimani Nairobi
18. Isiolo Branch- White House Building, Isiolo-Moyale Highway, Isiolo

== See also ==
- CBK
- Kenya Banks
- Kenya Economy
- Sharia Banking
- Gulf African Bank
