= Gross loan =

Gross loan is the total amount of issued credits given to banks during the accounting period. Liquidity of the bank can be judged upon the amount of its gross loans. Liquidity of the credit institutions is directly related to the refinancing needs.

Gross loan is the total amount of loans, refinanced by credit institutions subject to the Central Bank. The Central Bank, as the lender of last resort, provides loans (credits) to commercial banks and other credit institutions, when the banks themselves have completely depleted their internal resources and are unable to maintain their solvency through other means. The Central Bank gives loans to commercial banks at the refinancing interest rate, which is minimal and may vary, depending on the type of services the given bank provides.

== Use in banking statistics ==
Gross loans are widely used in international banking statistics to assess the exposure of credit institutions and monitor financial stability. They represent the book value of all outstanding loans before deducting impairments, write-offs, or provisions for expected losses. Financial regulators and central banks track gross loan figures to evaluate lending trends, credit growth, and the potential buildup of systemic risk in the banking system.

== See also ==
- Gross domestic product
- Gross national product
- Gross profit
- Gross income
