= Philip Ndegwa =

Kenyan politician

Phillip Ndegwa was a Kenyan economist, entrepreneur, former Governor of the Central Bank of Kenya, and patriarch of one of the country's wealthiest families.

== Education ==
Born in Kirinyaga County, Ndegwa was educated at Alliance High School, Makerere University College and Harvard University.

== Work ==
In 1965, he joined the civil service as an advisor on planning and economic issues. He would later serve as a Permanent Secretary in the Ministries of Agriculture, Finance and Economic Planning. Ndegwa became the third Governor of the Central Bank of Kenya in December 1982, an office he held until January 1988. He was appointed Executive Chairman of the Kenya Commercial Bank in November 1987. In the same year, the United Nations Secretary General appointed him to a panel of international economic experts charged with examining Africa's debt crisis and recommending policies to address it.

Mr. Ndegwa played a key role in the privatization of Kenya Airways. He wrote several books, the last of which was Africa to 2000: Imperative Political and Economic Agenda, published in 1994 and coauthored with Mr. Reginald Herbold Green.

Other offices Ndegwa held included:

- Board of the United Nations University World Institute for Development Economics Research (UNU-WIDER)
- Governor, Central Bank of Kenya
- Permanent Secretary, Ministry of Finance, Kenya
- Research fellow and lecturer in economics at Makerere University
- Assistant Director at the United Nations Environment Programme
- Chairman of the Kenya Pipeline Company
- Chairman of the National Bank of Kenya
- Chairman of the Agricultural Finance Corporation
- Chairman of Kenya Airways
- Chairman of Kenya Revenue Authority
- Chairman of First Chartered Securities Limited
- Chairman of The Society for International Development, Kenya Chapter
- Chairman of the Insurance Company of East Africa (ICEA)
- Chairman of the African Mercantile Bank (AMBank) which merged with NIC Bank in 1997

== First Chartered Securities ==
Philip Ndegwa founded First Chartered Securities in 1974 with 20 other shareholders.

Insurance - Its first major acquisition was a 100% purchase of the Insurance Company of East Africa (ICEA). Following the merger of ICEA and the Lion of Kenya Insurance to form the ICEA Lion Group (which is one of Eastern Africa's largest insurance companies), First Chartered Securities now owns an 80% stake in the new entity, with the remaining 20% held by Kenya Holding Limited.

Banking - First Chartered Securities has a stake of a 24.98% stake in NIC Bank that was valued at KSh. 5.22 billion as at December 28, 2012 (US$64 million at the exchange rate then).

Real Estate - First Chartered Securities real estate assets include Riverside Park and AMBank House, both in Nairobi.

Others - First Chartered Securities made forays into other sectors, including logistics, agriculture, milling and beverages. It owned Inchcape Shipping but sold its interests. It also had interests in catering firm Nairobi Airport Services (NAS), in which a French multinational, Servair, acquired a 59% stake in December 2012, estimated at more than KSh. 2.25 billion (US$26 million).

== Personal life ==
Two of Philip Ndegwa's children became officials at NIC Bank and First Chartered Securities: James P. M. Ndegwa (chairman of the Board), and Andrew S. M. Ndegwa (Non-Executive Director).

== Death ==
Philip Ndegwa died on 7 January 1996. As a tribute, the United Nations released the multi-author research volume Renewing Social and Economic Progress in Africa: Essays in Memory of Philip Ndegwa in the year 2000.
