= List of banks in Kenya =

This is a list of commercial banks and other licensed credit institutions in Kenya, as updated December 2025 by the Central Bank of Kenya.

== List of commercial banks ==
The CBK categorizes banks into three tiers:

=== Tier I Banks ===
This is the Large Tier Group. They each hold more than 5 percent of the market's Total Net Assets. Collectively, they represent 69.8 percent of the entire banking sector's Total Net Assets. As of 31 December 2025, the Tier I Banks in order of size was as follows:

1. KCB Bank Kenya Limited, part of KCB Group
2. Equity Bank Kenya Limited, part of Equity Group
3. Co-operative Bank of Kenya Ltd
4. NCBA Bank Kenya PLC, part of NCBA Group
5. Absa Bank Kenya PLC, part of Absa Group
6. Stanbic Bank Kenya Ltd, part of Standard Bank Group
7. I&M Bank Ltd, part of I&M Bank Group
8. Diamond Trust Bank Kenya Ltd, part of Diamond Trust Bank Group

=== Tier II Banks ===
This is the Medium Tier Group. They each hold between 1 percent 5 percent of the market's Total Net Assets. Collectively, they represent 23.2 percent of the entire banking sector's Total Net Assets. As of 31 December 2025, the Tier II Banks in order of size was as follows:

1. Standard Chartered Bank Kenya Ltd, part of Standard Chartered Group
2. Prime Bank Ltd
3. Bank of Baroda (Kenya) Ltd, part of Bank of Baroda Group
4. Family Bank Ltd
5. Citibank N.A. Kenya, part of Citigroup
6. Bank of India, part of Bank of India Group
7. National Bank of Kenya Ltd, owned by Access Bank Group
8. SBM Bank Kenya Ltd, part of State Bank of Mauritius Group
9. Sidian Bank Ltd, part of the Centum Group
10. Ecobank Kenya Ltd, part of Ecobank Group
11. Housing Finance Company of Kenya Ltd (HFC)

=== Tier III Banks ===
This is the Small Peer Group. They each hold less than 1 percent of the market's Total Net Assets. Collectively, they represent 7.0 percent of the entire banking sector's Total Net Assets. As of 31 December 2025, the Tier III Banks in order of size was as follows:

1. Victoria Commercial Bank PLC
2. Gulf African Bank Ltd
3. Bank of Africa Kenya Ltd, part of Bank of Africa Group
4. Guaranty Trust Bank (Kenya) Ltd, part of GTCO Group
5. African Banking Corporation Ltd (ABC Bank)
6. Kingdom Bank Ltd, Part of Co-operative Bank of Kenya Ltd
7. Habib Bank AG Zurich, part of Habib Bank Group
8. DIB Bank Kenya Ltd, part of DIB Group
9. Premier Bank Kenya Ltd, part of Premier Bank Group
10. Commercial International Bank Kenya Ltd (CIB), part of CIB Group
11. Credit Bank PLC
12. Development Bank of Kenya Ltd, state-owned
13. Middle East Bank (Kenya) Ltd
14. Guardian Bank Ltd
15. Paramount Bank Ltd, Part of Zenith Bank
16. M Oriental Bank Ltd
17. United Bank for Africa Kenya Ltd, part of UBA Group
18. Access Bank (Kenya) PLC, part of Access Bank Group
19. Consolidated Bank of Kenya Ltd, state-owned
20. Spire Bank Ltd

== Recent developments ==
As of early 2026, total assets of Kenya's banking sector exceeded KSh 8 trillion, with customer deposits reaching approximately KSh 5.9 trillion, reflecting continued growth and resilience of the financial system.

The sector remains highly concentrated, with the largest banking groups accounting for a significant share of total assets. At the same time, Kenya continues to be a global leader in digital financial services, with widespread adoption of mobile money significantly influencing banking activity and customer behavior.

== Investment banks ==
This is a list of Investment banks and stockbrokerage firms in Kenya They are regulated by the Capital Markets Authority and the Nairobi Securities Exchange:

- ABC Capital
- African Alliance Kenya Investment Bank
- Afrika Investment Bank
- ApexAfrica Capital
- CBA Capital
- Discount Securities (Under Statutory management)
- Dyer & Blair Investment Bank
- Equity Investment Bank
- Faida Investment Bank
- Hakuna Ventures
- Francis Drummond & Company
- Genghis Capital
- Kestrel Capital
- Kingdom Securities
- Ngenye Kariuki & Co (Under Statutory management)
- NIC Securities
- Old Mutual Securities
- Renaissance Capital (Kenya)
- SBG Securities
- Standard Investment Bank
- Sterling Capital Limited
- Suntra Investment Bank

== Mortgage finance institution ==
- Housing Finance Company of Kenya Ltd (HFC)

== Non-operating bank holding companies ==
- Bakki Holdco Limited, intermediate holding of the Centum Group and parent of Sidian Bank
- Equity Group Holdings Limited, parent of Equity Group
- HF Group Limited, parent of HFC
- I&M Group PLC, parent of I&M Bank Group
- KCB Group PLC, parent of KCB Group
- M Holdings Limited, parent of M Oriental Group
- NCBA Group PLC, parent of NCBA Group
- Stanbic Holdings PLC, intermediate holding of the Standard Bank Group

== Microfinance banks ==
This is the Central Bank of Kenya's list of Licensed Microfinance Banks, updated in August 2024.

- Caritas Microfinance Bank Ltd
- Branch Microfinance Bank Ltd
- Choice Microfinance Bank Ltd
- Daraja Microfinance Bank Ltd
- Faulu Microfinance Bank Ltd
- Kenya Women Microfinance Bank PLC
- Rafiki Microfinance Bank Ltd
- Lolc Kenya Microfinance Bank PLC
- SMEP Microfinance Bank Ltd
- Sumac Microfinance Bank Ltd
- U & I Microfinance Bank Ltd
- Salaam Microfinance Bank Ltd
- On It Microfinance Bank Ltd
- Muungano Microfinance Bank PLC

== See also ==
- Capital Markets Authority
- Central Bank of Kenya
- Companies traded on the Nairobi Securities Exchange
- Mwalimu Cooperative Savings and Credit Society Limited
- Nairobi Securities Exchange
- Kenya Post Office Savings Bank
- Economy of Kenya
- List of banks in Africa
