= Indo-Zambia Bank Limited =

Bank of Zambia

Coordinates: 15°25′23″S 28°16′59″E

Indo–Zambia Bank
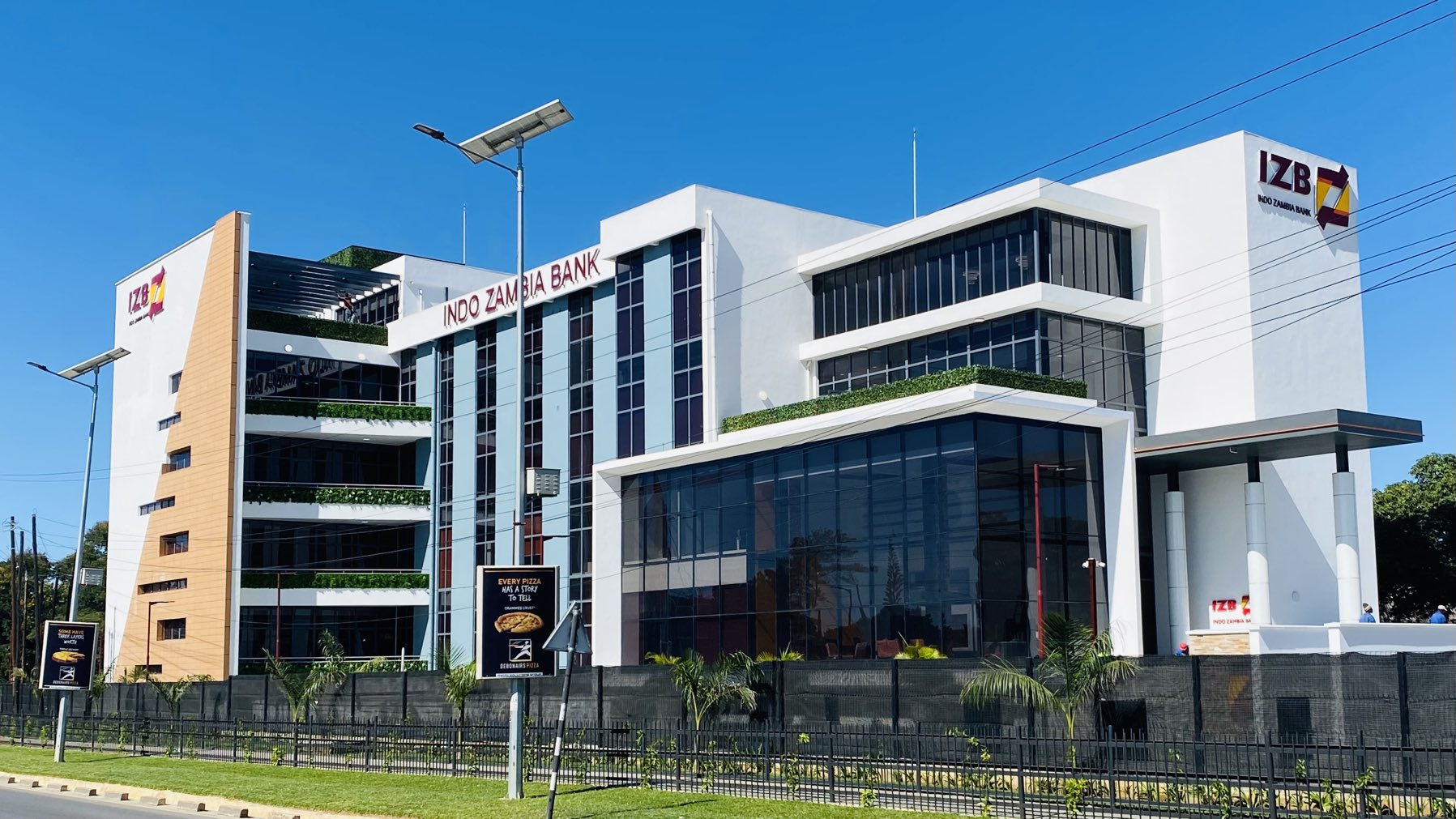
- Type: Private
- Industry: Banking
- Founded: 19 October 1984; 41 years ago
- Headquarters: Lusaka, Zambia
- Key people: Michael Gondwe; Chairperson; Kowdichar Shashidhar; Managing Director
- Products: Deposits, Loans, Debit cards, Bancassurance, Trade Finance, investments, Credit cards
- Revenue: ▲Aftertax:ZMW:604.26 million (US$23.49 million) (2023)
- Total assets: ZMW:17.78 billion (US$691 million) (Dec:2023)
- Number of employees: 500+ (2023)
- Website: www.izb.co.zm

Indo–Zambia Bank (IZB), whose full name is Indo–Zambia Bank Limited, is a commercial bank in Zambia. It is licensed by the Bank of Zambia, the central bank and national banking regulator.

== Overview ==
Indo Zambia Bank is a leading Banking and financial services provider in Zambia, providing Corporate and retail services, viz Current, Savings and Fixed Deposits, Loans, Investments, Bank Assurance services, Trade Finance and Debit/Credit card, to the communities it serves. As of December 2023, the bank controlled total assets of ZMW:17.78 billion (US$691 million), with shareholders' equity of ZMW:2.28 billion (US$88.64 million).

== History ==
The bank was founded in on 19 October 1984 by the Government of Zambia, and three state owned Indian banks: (a) Bank of Baroda (b) Bank of India and (c) Central Bank of India. Indo-Zambia Bank is a significant employer in the communities that it serves and is an active participant in Corporate Social Responsibility activities in Zambia.

== Location ==
The headquarters of the bank is located at Indo House, Corporate Head office, Plot no 1213/1214 Corner of Addis Ababa Drive, Great east Road, in the city of Lusaka, the capital city of Zambia, and its largest metropolitan area. The geographical coordinates of the bank's headquarters are: -15.398561,28.3034826 (Latitude:-15.39861; Longitude: 28.3034826).

== Ownership ==
The stock of Indo-Zambia Bank is held by four investors. The table below shows the ownership percentage of each shareholder:

Indo-Zambia Bank Limited Stock Ownership
Rank	Name of Owner	Percentage Ownership
1	Government of Zambia	40.0
2	Bank of Baroda	20.0
3	Bank of India	20.0
4	Central Bank of India	20.0
	Total	100.00

== Branch network ==
The bank maintains its headquarters in Lusaka, the capital and largest city in Zambia. As of December 2023, it had a network of thirty-three branches in various parts of the country.

== Governance ==
Michael Gondwe, a Zambian, is the Chairperson of the six-person Board of Directors. Kowdichar Shashidhar, an Indian, serves as the Managing Director.

== See also ==
- List of banks in Zambia
- Bank of Zambia
- Economy of Zambia
- Bank of Baroda
- Bank of India
- Central Bank of India
