= Central Bank of Kenya =

Monetary authority of Kenya

Central Bank of Kenya Banki Kuu ya Kenya

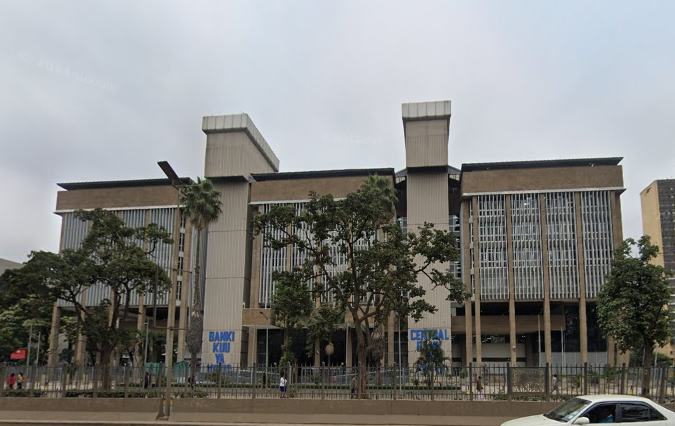
- CBK's head office in Nairobi
- Central bank of: Kenya
- Coordinates: 1.28988°S 36.824922°E
- Established: 24 March 1966 (legal); 14 September 1966 (public operation)
- Ownership: 100% state ownership
- Governor: Kamau Thugge
- Currency: Kenyan shilling KES (ISO 4217)
- Reserves: US$8.586 billion
- Preceded by: East African Currency Board
- Website: www.centralbank.go.ke

The Central Bank of Kenya (CBK) (Swahili: Banki Kuu ya Kenya) is the monetary authority of Kenya. Its head office is located in Nairobi. CBK was founded in 1966 after the dissolution of East African Currency Board (EACB). Dr. Kamau Thugge, CBS is the current Governor and Dr. Susan Koech is the Deputy Governor.

== Organizational structure ==
=== Management ===
The bank’s executive management team comprises the governor, deputy governors and heads of departments. The governor assumes the role of Chief Executive Officer of the bank and is therefore responsible for its overall management. The governor is also the bank’s official spokesperson.

=== Governor ===
The current governor of the bank is Dr. Kamau Thugge. Former governors of the bank are:

- Kamau Thugge (June 2023 to Date)
- Patrick Njoroge (June 2015 – June 2023)
- Njuguna Ndung'u (March 2007 – March 2015)
- Andrew Mullei (March 2003 – March 2007)
- Nahashon Nyagah (April 2001 – March 2003)
- Micah Cheserem (July 1993 – April 2001)
- Eric Cheruiyot Kotut (January 1988 – July 1993)
- Philip Ndegwa (December 1982 – January 1988)
- Duncan Ndegwa (May 1967 – December 1982)
- Leon Baranski (May 1966 – May 1967)

=== Deputy governor ===
The current deputy governors are Susan Koech and Gerald Nyaoma.

- Susan Koech (March 2023 to Date)
- Gerald Nyaoma (November 2024 to Date)
- Sheila M'Mbijjewe (2015-2023)
- Haron Sirima (2011–2015)
- Hezron Nyangito (2008–2011)
- Jacinta Wanjala Mwatela (2004–2008), acting Governor 2006–2007
- Edward C. Sambili (2001–2004)
- Thomas Nzioki Kibua (1993–2001)
- Wanjohi Muriithi (1991–1993)
- Eliphaz Riungu (1988–1991)
- Eric Cheruiyot Kotut (1984–1988)
- Ahmed Abdallah (1967–1984)

=== Members of the board ===
The current board of directors are as follows:

- Andrew Mukite Musangi – Chairman of the Board
- Principal Secretary to the National Treasury
- Kamau Thugge, CBS – Governor
- Nelius Kariuki – member
- Rachel Dzombo – member
- Ravi Ruparel – member
- Samson Cherutich – member

=== Departments ===
- Governor's Office
- Bank Supervision
- Banking and Payment Services
- Financial Markets
- Research
- Currency Operations
- Branch Administration
- Strategic Management
- Information Technology
- Finance
- General Services
- Internal Audit and Risk
- Human Resources
- CBK Institute of Monetary Studies (IMS)

== History and powers ==
The CBK joined the Association of African Central Banks on December 23, 1968.

Amid the COVID-19 pandemic, the CBK instituted a loan restructuring program to help financially distressed borrowers. The restructuring program was in place from March 2020 to March 2021.

In 2021, legislation passed the National Assembly that allows the CBK to cap interest rates and to revoke the licenses of digital lenders that breach the Data Protection Act or the Consumer Protection Act.

In October 2023, while responding to questions from a parliamentary committee on finance and national planning, CBK Governor Dr. Thugge said the decline in international reserves was caused by an overvaluation of the shilling against the dollar. This was against the backdrop of a gradual reduction in import cover from 5.5 months to 3.7 months. Thugge cited data from the IMF and World Bank which put the overvaluation of the shilling in the range of 20-25%. According to the Governor, the attempt to artificially maintain a strong exchange rate came at the cost of losing vital international reserves.

== See also ==
- Kenyan shilling
- Economy of Kenya
- List of central banks of Africa
- List of central banks
- List of financial supervisory authorities by country
