= Patience Mutesi =

Rwandan businesswoman and corporate executive

- Born: Patience Mutesi; Rwanda
- Education: Makerere University (Bachelor of Science in Quantitave Economics); Maastricht University (Master of Business Administration)
- Occupations: Businesswoman & Bank Executive
- Years active: 2000s - present
- Title: Managing Director & CEO; BPR Bank Rwanda Plc

Patience Mutesi is a Rwandan businesswoman and corporate executive. She is the managing director and chief executive officer (CEO) of BPR Bank Rwanda Plc, a commercial bank in Rwanda and a subsidiary of the KCB Group, a financial services conglomerate, based in Kenya. She took her present position on 1 February 2023.

== Background and education ==
She is a Rwandan national. Her first degree is a Bachelor of Science in Quantitave Economics, awarded by Makerere University in Kampala, Uganda. Her second degree is a Master of Business Administration (MBA), obtained from Maastricht University, in Maastricht, Netherlands. She is an Eisenhower Fellow. She also completed the Management Programme of the Stockholm School of Economics, in Stockholm, Sweden.

== Career ==
She has a "diversified background in the financial sector, including credit management, product development and fundraising". Mutesi has "extensive experience in deal origination, negotiation, structuring, and execution"... She also possesses "credible expertise in strategic risk management".. She previously served as Corporate Bank Head at Ecobank Rwanda and as Deputy Head of Corporate Banking and Senior Relationship Manager, at Banque Commerciale du Rwanda (BCR) (now I&M Bank Rwanda Plc).

Immediately prior to taking the helm at BPR Bank Randa, she was the country director of TradeMark East Africa (TMEA), a position that she held from July 2016 until January 2023. At BPR Bank Rwanda, she replaced George Odhiambo, a Kenyan national who was appointed CEO of National Bank of Kenya.

== Other considerations ==
Mutesi has previously served as a member of the Board of Directors at BPR Bank Rwanda, MTN Rwanda, Rwanda Cooperation (RCI) and as a member of the advisory council of the One Acre Fund (Rwanda).

== See also ==
- List of banks in Rwanda
- Lina Higiro
- Annet Nakawunde Mulindwa
- Diane Karusisi
