= Peace Uwase =

Rwandan accountant and bank executive

- Born: 1978 (age 47–48); Rwanda
- Citizenship: Rwanda
- Education: Makerere University (Bachelor of Commerce); Oklahoma Christian University (Master of Business Administration); Association of Chartered Certified Accountants (Chartered Certified Accountant); Harvard Kennedy School (Master of Public Administration)
- Occupations: Accountant & Bank Executive
- Known for: Accounting & Banking
- Title: Director General, Financial Stability at National Bank of Rwanda

Peace Masozera Uwase, also Peace Uwase, is a Rwandan accountant and bank executive, who serves as the Director General of the Financial Stability department of the National Bank of Rwanda (BNR), since April 2016.

Before that Uwase was the managing partner at PAM Business Advisory, between January 2013 until April 2016. In that role, she served as a finance and management consultant, specializing in banking, accounting, audit, risk management, governance and strategic planning.

== Background and education ==
Peace Uwase attended Mount Saint Mary's College Namagunga, a residential, all-girl middle and high school, in Mukono District, in Uganda, for her O-Level and A-Level studies, between 1992 and 1998. She studied at Makerere University, also in Uganda, graduating with a Bachelor of Commerce degree in 2001. Later, she obtained a Master of Business Administration from the Oklahoma Christian University in the United States. She is also a Chartered Certified Accountant, recognized by the Association of Chartered Certified Accountants of the United Kingdom.

== Career ==
Her first job was as an Audit Associate at PriceWaterhouseCoopers, in their office in Kampala, Uganda, where she served for more than three years. She relocated to Rwanda in January 2005 and took up employment as the Head of finance and administration at the Bank of Commerce, Development & Industry, (BCDI), the precursor to Ecobank Rwanda, where she served for two and half years.

After Ecobank acquired BCDI in July 2007, she stayed on in the new role of Chief Financial Officer at Ecobank Rwanda. Then for one year, she served as the chief financial officer at Ecobank Guinea Bissau, based in Bissau.

She then served as an independent consultant for about a year and half, before she was hired by Kivu Watt Limited, as finance manager, working there for over one year. She then returned to private consulting for three and half years, before joining the National Bank of Rwanda, in April 2016.

== Other considerations ==
Peace Uwase is a member of the board of directors of Rwanda Revenue Authority.

== See also ==
- List of banks in Rwanda
- Lina Higiro
- Alice Kalonzo–Zulu
