= I&M Bank Limited =

Commercial bank in Kenya

I&M Bank Kenya Limited (investments and mortgages bank kenya limited)
- Type: Private company
- Industry: Financial services
- Founded: 15 May 1974; 52 years ago
- Headquarters: 1 Park Avenue; Nairobi, Kenya
- Key people: S.B.R. Shah (chairman), Sarit Raja- Shah (executive director), Gul Khan (CEO)
- Products: Loans, transaction accounts, credit cards, debit cards, savings, prepaid cards, trade finance, mortgages
- Revenue: US$311 million (KES: 34.15 billion) (financial year 2021)
- Total assets: US$3.05 billion (KES: 333.98 billion) (2021)
- Parent: I&M Holdings Limited
- Website: www.imbankgroup.com

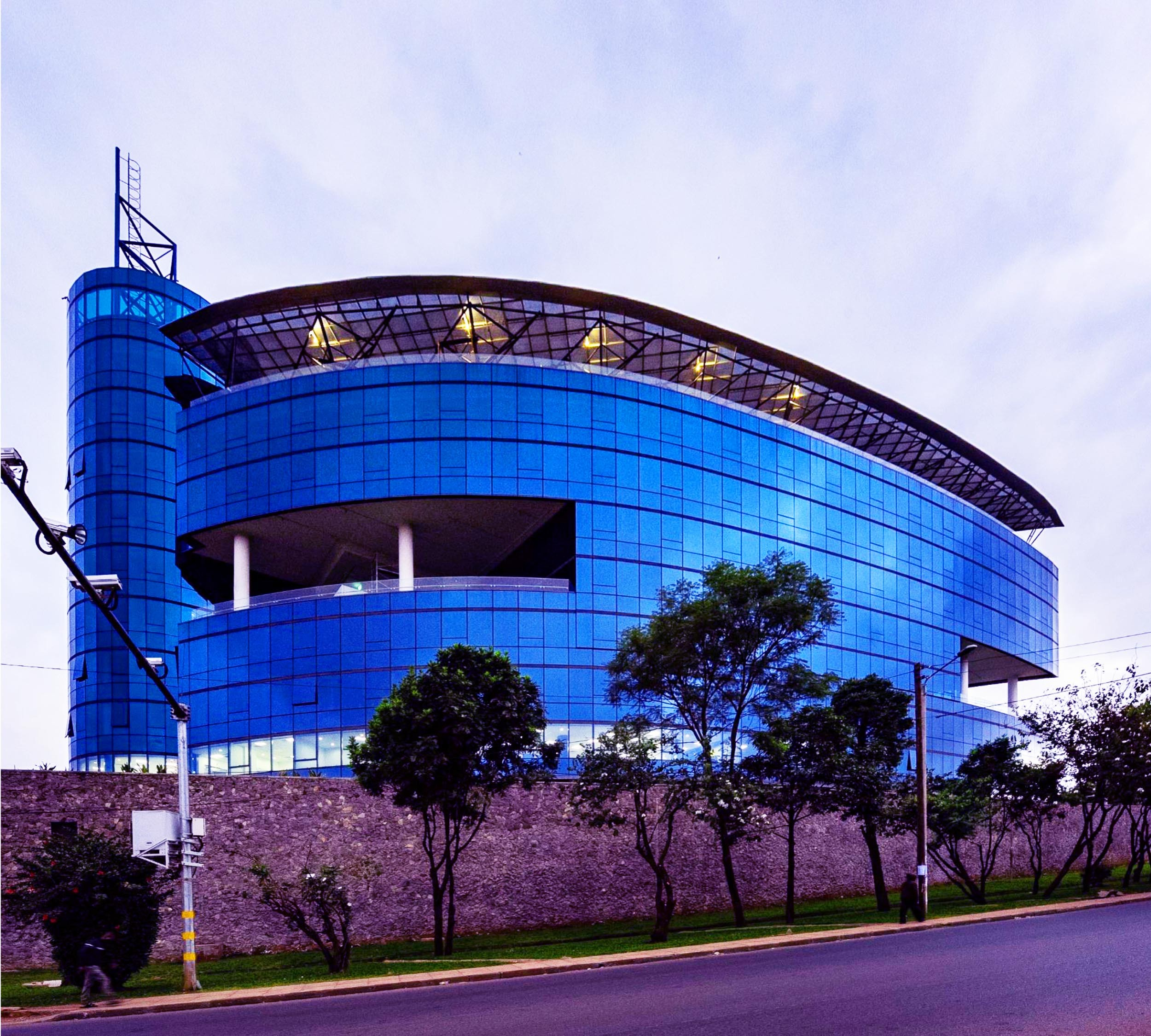
Headquarters, I&M Bank 1 Park Avenue, Nairobi

I&M Bank Kenya Limited is a commercial bank in Kenya, the largest economy in the East African Community. It is licensed by the Central Bank of Kenya, the central bank and national banking regulator.

== Overview ==
As of September 2019, the bank's total assets were valued in excess of US$2.52 billion (KES: 261 billion), with shareholders' equity of approximately US$424 million (KES: 44 billion). As of September 2019, the bank was ranked 8th, by total assets, out of the 40 licensed banks in the country, at that time. I&M Bank serves the banking needs of large and small business customers with emphasis on large and medium-sized corporations as well as individuals with emphasis on premium customers I&M also moved to Tier I after takeover of Giro Bank.

== History ==
In 1974, Investments & Mortgages Limited was formed as a private company providing personalised financial services to business people in the Nairobi area. In 1980, I&M, as the company was known at that time, was registered as a Financial Institution under the Banking Act. Following changes in the regulations of the Central Bank of Kenya, the banking regulator in the country, I&M became a commercial bank in 1996.

In 2002, a 16-storey glass and steel skyscraper known as the I&M Bank Tower was opened on Kenyatta Avenue in Nairobi's central business district. The following year, I&M Bank acquired Biashara Bank of Kenya Limited, expanding I&M's branch network, client base and assets under management.

In 2007, DEG and PROPARCO, two International development financial institutions, invested approximately US$4.5 million to acquire 11.96 percent shareholding in I&M Bank. That shareholding was later increased to 19.7 percent.

In 2008, I&M Bank acquired a 50 percent ownership in First City Bank Limited (FCB) of Mauritius. FCB has since rebranded itself as Bank One Mauritius. In 2010, I&M Bank acquired a controlling shareholding in CF Union Bank of Tanzania. CF Union Bank has since rebranded into I&M Bank (Tanzania).

In July 2012, I&M Bank Group took a controlling interest in Commercial Bank of Rwanda (BCR), the second-largest commercial bank in the country at the time, for an undisclosed sum of money.

In August 2013, BCR rebranded to I&M Bank Rwanda.

In 2013, I&M Bank created I&M Holdings Limited, as the holding company of all the group's businesses and subsidiaries. The holding company's shares of stock are listed and publicly traded on the Nairobi Securities Exchange, under the symbol I&M.

In 2020, 1 Park Avenue was opened as I&M Banks's new headquarters. The building is located at the Junction of 1st Parklands Avenue and Limuru Road in Nairobi.

== Acquisition ==
In September 2015, I&M Holdings began the process of acquiring Giro Commercial Bank and the merging of its business with that of I&M Bank Limited. The process, which required regulatory approval, was concluded in February 2017, with Giro Commercial Bank surrendering its banking license and becoming part of I&M Bank Kenya.

== Branch network ==
As of November 2022, the bank maintained a network of 40 branches in Kenya, at the following locations. Each branch has an on-site ATM.

1. Kenyatta Avenue Branch – I&M Bank Tower, Kenyatta Avenue, Nairobi
2. Karen Branch – Karen Office Park, Langata Road, Karen, Nairobi
3. 2nd Ngong Avenue Branch – I&M Bank House, 2nd Ngong Avenue, Nairobi
4. Sarit Centre Branch – 1st Floor, Sarit Centre, Westlands, Nairobi
5. Biashara Street Branch – Ansh Plaza, Biashara Street, Nairobi
6. Industrial Area Branch – KCC Building, Changamwe Road, Nairobi
7. Langata Link Branch – Langata Link Complex, Langata South Road, Nairobi
8. Valley Arcade Branch – Kenol Kobil Station, Gitanga Road, Nairobi
9. Panari Sky Centre Branch – Nairobi-Mombasa Road, Nairobi
10. One Park Branch – 1 Park Avenue, Ground Floor (Junction of 1st Parklands and Limuru Road)
11. Wilson Airport Branch – Pewin House, Wilson Airport, Nairobi
12. Ongata Rongai Branch – First Floor, Maasai Mall, Ongata Rongai, Nairobi
13. South C Branch – South C Shopping Centre, Nairobi
14. Riverside Drive Branch -14 Riverside Drive, Nairobi
15. Nyali Complex Branch – Nyali Cinemax, Main Nyali Road, Mombasa
16. Mombasa Branch – Biashara Building, Nyerere Road, Mombasa
17. Kisumu Branch – Bon Accord House, Oginga Odinga Street, Kisumu
18. Nakuru Branch – Polo Centre, Kenyatta Avenue, Nakuru
19. Eldoret Branch – Ground Floor, Zion Mall, Uganda Road, Eldoret
20. Changamwe Branch – First Floor, Refinery Building, Refinery Road, Mombasa
21. Kisii Branch – Royal Tower, Hospital Road, Kisii
22. Malindi Branch – First Floor, Pine Court Building, Lamu Road, Malindi
23. Nyeri Branch – Ground Floor, Nyaatha Plaza, Kimathi Way, Nyeri
24. Thika Branch – Ground Floor, 80 West Place, Opposite Tuskys Supermarket, Thika
25. Village Market Branch – Village Market Shopping Complex - New Wing, 1st Floor, Limuru Road
26. Sarit Centre Select Branch – Sarit Centre New Wing, Lower Ground Floor, Westlands
27. Lavington Mall Branch – First Floor, Lavington Mall, off James Gichuru Road, Nairobi
28. Kitale Branch – Ground Floor, Mega Centre Mall, Kitale
29. Lunga Lunga Branch – First Floor, Lunga Lunga Mall, Lunga Lunga Road, Industrial Area, Nairobi
30. Yaya Centre Branch – Fourth Floor, Yaya Centre, Argwings Kodhek Road, Nairobi
31. Gateway Mall Branch – Gateway Mall, Mombasa Road, opposite Syokimao Railway Station, Nairobi
32. Garden City Mall Branch – Garden City Mall, Thika Road, Nairobi
33. Nanyuki Branch – Ground Floor, Hussein Building, Nanyuki
34. Cross Road Branch – Off River Road, Nairobi
35. Meru Branch – Ground Floor, P&K Plaza, Moi Avenue, Meru
36. Eldama Park Branch – Eldama Park, Nairobi
37. Dunga Road Branch – Dunga Road, Industrial Area, Nairobi
38. Ridge Court Branch – Ridge Court, Parklands, Nairobi
39. Haile Selassie Branch – Patel Samaj Building, Haile Selassie Avenue, Mombasa
40. Spring Valley Branch – Ground Floor, Block B, Spring Valley Business Park, Nairobi

== See also ==
- I&M Bank Tower
- Economy of Kenya
- List of banks in Kenya
