= Edigold Monday =

Ugandan businesswoman, accountant, bank executive, and educator

- Born: 1962 (age 63–64); Uganda
- Citizenship: Uganda
- Education: Makerere University (Bachelor of Science with Education); Heriot-Watt University (Master of Business Administration); Association of Chartered Certified Accountants (Chartered Certified Accountant)
- Occupation: Bank executive
- Years active: 1994–present
- Title: Managing director, Commercial Bank of Africa (Rwanda)

Edigold Monday is a Ugandan accountant, businesswoman, bank executive, and educator. She is the Uganda country director of Sparkassen-Finanzgruppe's foundation for international cooperation (German: Sparkassenstiftung für internationale Kooperation e.V.)., since December 2018.

Previously, she served as the managing director and chief executive officer of Commercial Bank of Africa (Rwanda), a licensed commercial bank.

Before that, she worked as the managing director of Bank of Africa (Uganda). Monday was the first Ugandan woman to hold the position of managing director and chief executive officer at BOA-Uganda and also the first Ugandan woman to serve as the chief executive officer of a commercial bank in the country's history.

== Education ==
Monday was admitted to Makerere University in 1984, graduating in 1987, with a Bachelor of Arts in economics and education. She is a chartered certified accountant, certified by the Association of Chartered Certified Accountants. Her second degree is a Master of Business Administration, obtained from Heriot-Watt University. She has attended many other business, management and banking courses, according to her online résumé.

== Career ==
Monday became a banker in 1994, starting as an accountant trainee at Centenary Bank. Over the years, she rose to the rank of chief internal auditor at Centenary Bank in 2001. In 2004 she left Centenary and joined Uganda Wildlife Authority, as their director of finance and administration, from June 2004 until January 2007.

She later joined Commercial Microfinance (CMF), a Tier II microfinance institution, rising to the level of executive director. When Industrial and General Insurance Company Plc. of Nigeria acquired CMF in 2008, renaming the institution Global Trust Bank, Monday served briefly as interim executive director before leaving to join BOA-Uganda. In 2009, she was appointed to serve as acting managing director at BOA-Uganda. She was confirmed in that capacity in December 2010, a position she held until her resignation in April 2014.

Effective 30 June 2014, Monday worked as the managing director/CEO of Crane Bank Rwanda Limited. When Commercial Bank of Africa (Rwanda) acquired Crane Bank Rwanda, on 21 February 2018, Monday became the managing director of the new bank.

In July 2018, CBA Rwanda appointed Lina Higiro as the new CEO, replacing Monday.
