= Eugene Ubalijoro =

Rwandan business executive

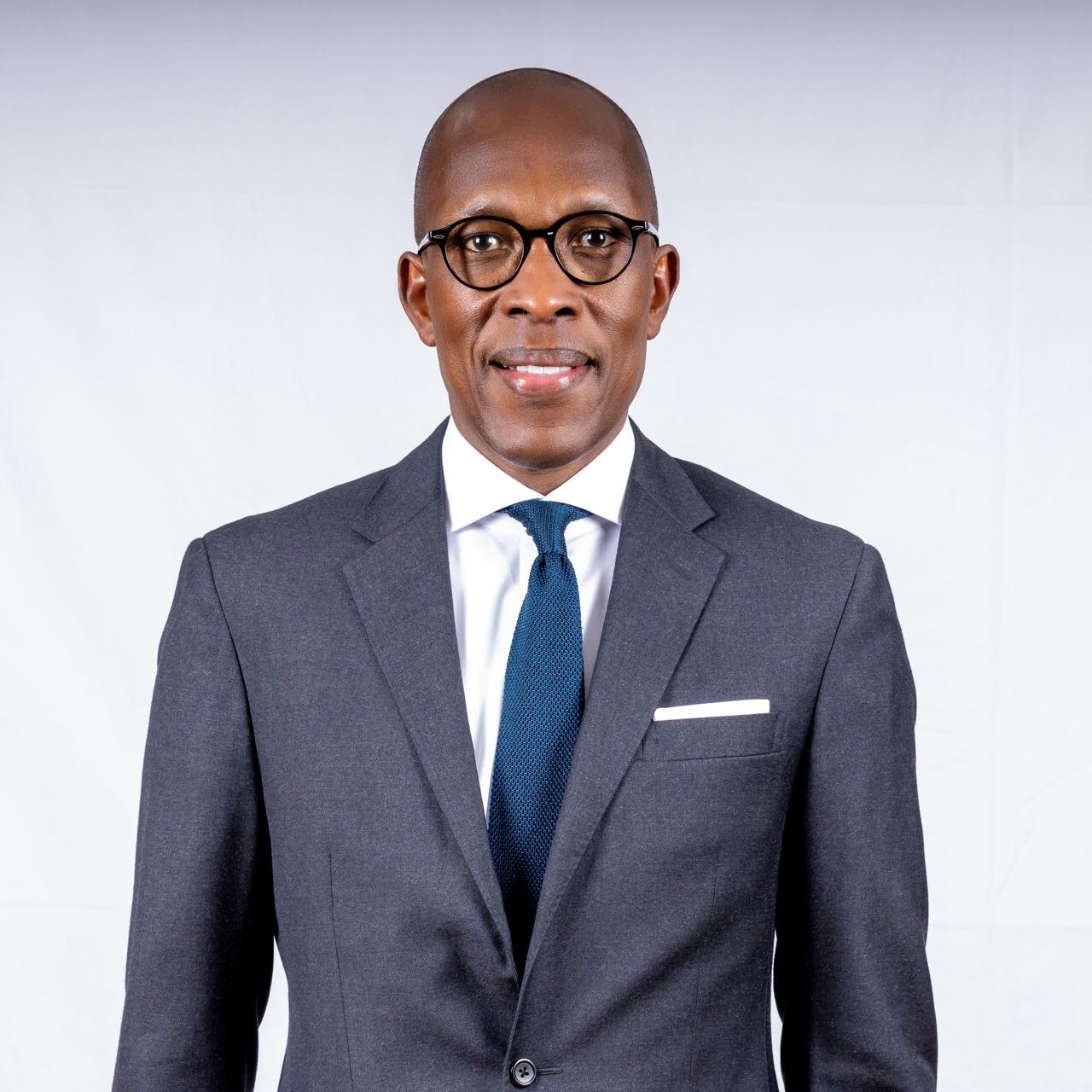
- Eugene Ubalijoro in 2022
- Born: 6 June 1964 (age 62); Rwanda
- Education: Georgetown University (BSBA); Université de Sherbrooke (MBA)
- Occupation: Business executive
- Employer(s): Heineken (1990–2020); Molson Coors (2020–present)
- Notable work: Heineken Brewery (Commercial director of Sub-Sahara Africa) (Managing Director at Brasseries de Bourbon)) (Managing director of Caribbean and Americas exports) (Managing director at Heineken Ethiopia); Molson Coors (Vice President of Sales in Central Region U.S.)
- Title: Vice president of sales in Central Region US at Molson Coors
- Board member of: Desnoes & Geddes(2015-2020); Bank of Kigali (2020-present)

Eugene Ubalijoro (born 6 June 1964), is a Rwandan business executive, who is serving as vice president at Molson Coors beverage company responsible for sales in central region states of United States of America based in Dallas, Texas since March 2021. Prior to his appointment, he was strategic projects partner in same company based in Chicago, Illinois since August 2020. He is currently a chairperson of the Board of Directors of Bank of Kigali, Rwanda since February 2025.

Prior to joining Molson Coors beverage company in August 2020, Ubalijoro served continuously for 30 years in different positions at Heineken Brewery between 1990 and 2020. Where from 2010 to 2018, he was serving as a managing director at Heineken Brewery responsible for Caribbean and Americas exports with residence in Miami. After this position in 2018, he was also appointed as managing director of Heineken Brewery branch in Ethiopia with residence in Addis Abba.

== Early life and education ==
Ubalijoro was born on June 6, 1964, and raised in Kigali, Rwanda until when he was 12 years old. In 1976, his parents moved to Washington, United States due to working reason. It helped Ubalijoro to attend his high school education at Rochambeau French International School of Washington between 1976 and 1982. From 1982, he joined Georgetown University, U.S. to pursue undergraduate degree where he graduated with bachelor's degree in business administration with double major in international management and finance in 1986. In 1987, Ubalijoro further enrolled in Université de Sherbrooke, Canada for post graduate degree, he graduated with master's degree of Business Administration with major in strategy and finance in 1989.

== Career ==
=== Heineken ===
In 1990, after graduating with post graduate degree in business administration from Université de Sherbrooke, Ubalijoro went back to Rwanda his motherland and started as international trainee at the part of Heineken Brewery in Rwanda known as Bralirwa Brewery. After 2 years, his attested skills led to first appointment as commercial manager at the Bralirwa Brewery company in 1992. He served in the position until February 1995, when he was promoted to Heineken Brewery U.S. as regional field marketing manager with residence in U.S. In June 1999, he was also promoted to headquarters of Heineken Brewery, Netherlands to become business consultant of the strategy support group with residence in Amsterdam. He was responsible for all companies operating under Heineken Brewery in the field of sales and distributions. He served in this position until January 2003 when he was appointed as commercial director of Sub Sahara Africa at Heineken Brewery headquarters in Netherlands.

In February 2006, Ubalijoro left Heineken Brewery headquarters in Amsterdam as he became the general manager of Brasseries de Bourbon, a part of Heineken Brewery located in Réunion Island. He served in this position until August 2010 when he was appointed as managing director responsible for Caribbean and Americas Heineken exports, with office in Miami, Florida, he worked under this position for 8 years. In September 2018, Ubalijoro was appointed to serve as managing director of Heineken Brewery in Ethiopia, based in Addis Abba until May 2020 when he exited Heineken Brewery doors for the first time in previous 30 years.

=== Molson coors ===
After 30 year-long career with Heineken Brewery in August 2020, Ubalijoro joined Molson Coors beverage company, a Canadian–American multinational drink and brewing company as strategic projects partner based in Chicago. After few months in March 2021, he was promoted and appointed as vice president at the company responsible for sales of central region states of United States of America based in Texas.

== Additional career ==
Board of Directorships
No	Company	Country	Start	End	References
1.	Heineken Panama	Panama	2010	2018	
2.	Heineken Suriname	Suriname	2010	2018	
3.	Commonwealth Brewery company (Kalik beers )	The Bahamas	2012	2020	
4.	FIFCO	Costa Rica	2015	2018	
5.	Desnoes & Geddes beverage company (Red Stripe beers)	Jamaica	2015	2020	
6.	Windward Leeward Brewery Company	St Lucia	2016	2020	
7.	Bank of Kigali	Rwanda	2020	-	

== Personal life ==
Ubalijoro is married with 3 children.
