= Alice Kilonzo–Zulu =

Kenyan bank executive

Alice Kilonzo-Zulu
- Born: 1969 (age 56–57); Kenya
- Citizenship: Kenya
- Education: BA in Politics with International Studies; MA in Economic & Social Studies
- Alma mater: University of Warwick; University of Manchester
- Occupation: Bank Executive
- Employer: Ecobank Rwanda
- Known for: Banking
- Title: Managing Director of Ecobank Rwanda

Alice Kilonzo–Zulu, (née Alice Kilonzo) is a Kenyan economist and bank executive who serves as the managing director of Ecobank Rwanda, a commercial bank licensed and supervised by the National Bank of Rwanda, the central bank and national banking regulator.

== Background and education ==
Alice Kilonzo was born in Kenya circa 1969. She studied at the University of Warwick, in the United Kingdom, graduating with a BA in Politics with International Studies in 1992. Later, she obtained an MA in Economics & Social Studies from the University of Manchester in 1993.

== Career ==
Her career in banking goes back to June 1995, when she took up employment with Citibank Kenya as a relationship manager, serving in that capacity for over six years. She was then promoted to senior relationship manager, responsible for public sector enterprises, where she served for nearly two years, until 2003.

She was further promoted to vice president, corporate banking, at Citibank Kenya, where she served for nearly three years. During that period, she also served as a member of the Branch Credit Committee. Starting in January 2006, and for the next six and a half years, Kilonzo served as the head of trade finance for the bank's customers in Kenya, Uganda, Tanzania and Zambia, at the level of director.

In 2012, she was hired by Ecobank Transnational Incorporated as a senior group manager responsible for trade finance and based in Nairobi, Kenya's capital and largest city, serving in that role for four and a half years. In November 2016, she was appointed as a CEO and managing director of Ecobank Rwanda.

== Other considerations ==
In her capacity as the managing director, Alice Kalonzo-Zulu is a member of the board of directors of Ecobank Rwanda. She is married to demographer Eliya Zulu.

== See also ==
- List of banks in Rwanda
- Lina Higiro
- Peace Uwase
