= I&M Bank Tanzania Limited =

Commercial bank in Tanzania

- Type: Private
- Industry: Banking
- Founded: 2002
- Headquarters: Dar es Salaam, Tanzania
- Key people: Sarit Raja Shah (chairman), Baseer Mohammed (chief executive officer)
- Products: Loans, savings, transaction accounts, investments, mortgages
- Revenue: ▲Pretax: TSh 3.81 billion (US$2.26 million) (2013)
- Total assets: TSh 296.6 billion (US$175.5 million) (2013)
- Owner: I&M Bank Group (55.03%)
- Number of employees: 100+ (2012)
- Website: www.imbankgroup.com/tz/

I&M Bank Tanzania Limited is a commercial bank in Tanzania, headquartered in Dar es Salaam. It is a subsidiary of Kenyan based I&M Bank Group. It is licensed by the Bank of Tanzania, the central bank and national banking regulator.

As of December 2013, the bank was a mid-sized financial institution, providing banking services to individuals and businesses, with emphasis on serving medium to large corporate clients. At that time, the bank's total assets were valued at approximately TSh 296.6 billion (US$175.5 million), with shareholders' equity estimated at TSh 29.4 billion (US$17.4 million).

== History ==
The bank started operations in Tanzania in 2002 as CF Union Bank, with headquarters in Dar-es-Salaam. By 2010 it operated two branches in Dar-es-Salaam and a third branch in Arusha. In January that year, the shareholders of CF Union Bank sold the bank to a consortium headed by I&M Bank Group. Other investors in the consortium included PROPARCO, the French Development Agency, Kibo Fund, a private equity firm based in Mauritius and Michael Shirima, a Tanzanian businessman who is the largest shareholder in Precision Air. In September 2010, the bank changed its name from CF Union Bank to I&M Bank (Tanzania) Limited, to reflect the new ownership.

== Ownership ==
I&M Bank Tanzania Limited is owned by institutions and one private individuals as detailed in the table below:

I&M Bank (Tanzania) stock ownership
Rank	Name of owner	Percentage ownership
1	I&M Holdings Limited	55.03
2	PROPARCO of France	20.0
3	Kibo Fund of Mauritius	20.0
4	Michael Shirima of Tanzania	4.97
5	Total	100.0

== Branch network ==
As of November 2014, I&M Bank (Tanzania) Limited maintains the following networked branches:

- Main Branch - Indira Gandhi Street Next to Nida Textiles Mills, Dar es Salaam
- Moshi Branch - Rindi Lane Road, Moshi
- Oysterbay Branch - Toure Drive & Ghuba Road, 344 Block F, Oysterbay Area, Dar es Salaam
- Maktaba Branch - Maktaba Square, Maktaba Street, Dar es Salaam]
- Kariakoo Branch - Plot 21 Livingstone Street, Kariakoo, Dar es Salaam
- Arusha Branch - Sunda Plaza, ground floor, Goliondoi Street, Arusha
- Nyerere Road Branch - PSSSF Plaza Building along Nyerere Road
- Mwanza Branch - Gradia Tower, Uhuru Street, Mwanza

== See also ==
- I&M Bank Group
- I&M Bank Limited
- Bank One Mauritius
- List of banks in Tanzania
