= Sugar industry in Rwanda =

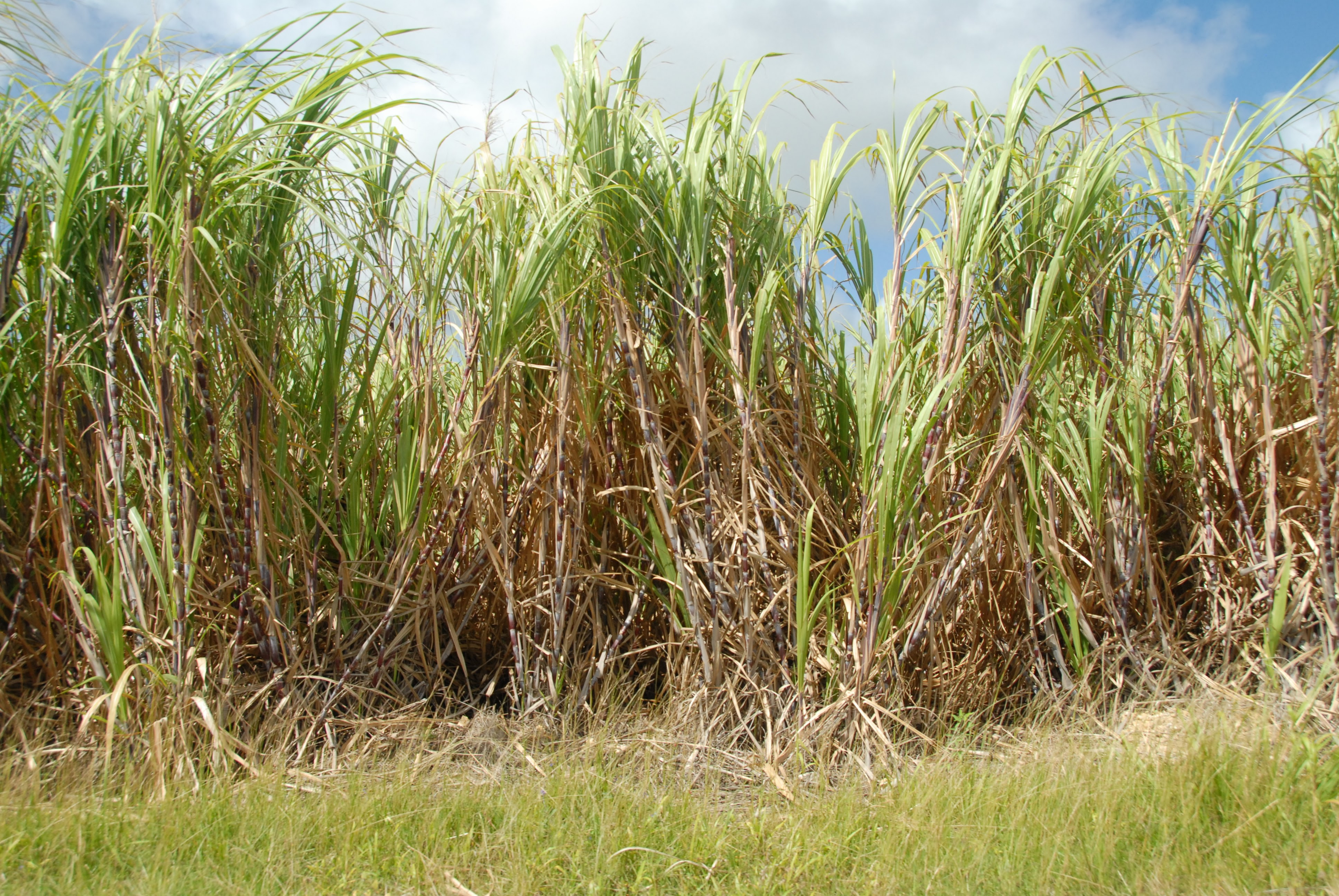
Sugar cane field

Rwanda produces the least quantity of granular brown sugar among four of the six countries of the East African Community, namely Kenya, Rwanda, Tanzania and Uganda, accounting for about 12,000 metric tonnes annually as of August 2016. With national consumption measured at 90,000 metric tonnes annually in 2016, it was expected that by 2020, annual consumption would have reached 160,000 metric tonnes, costing over US$150 million to import.

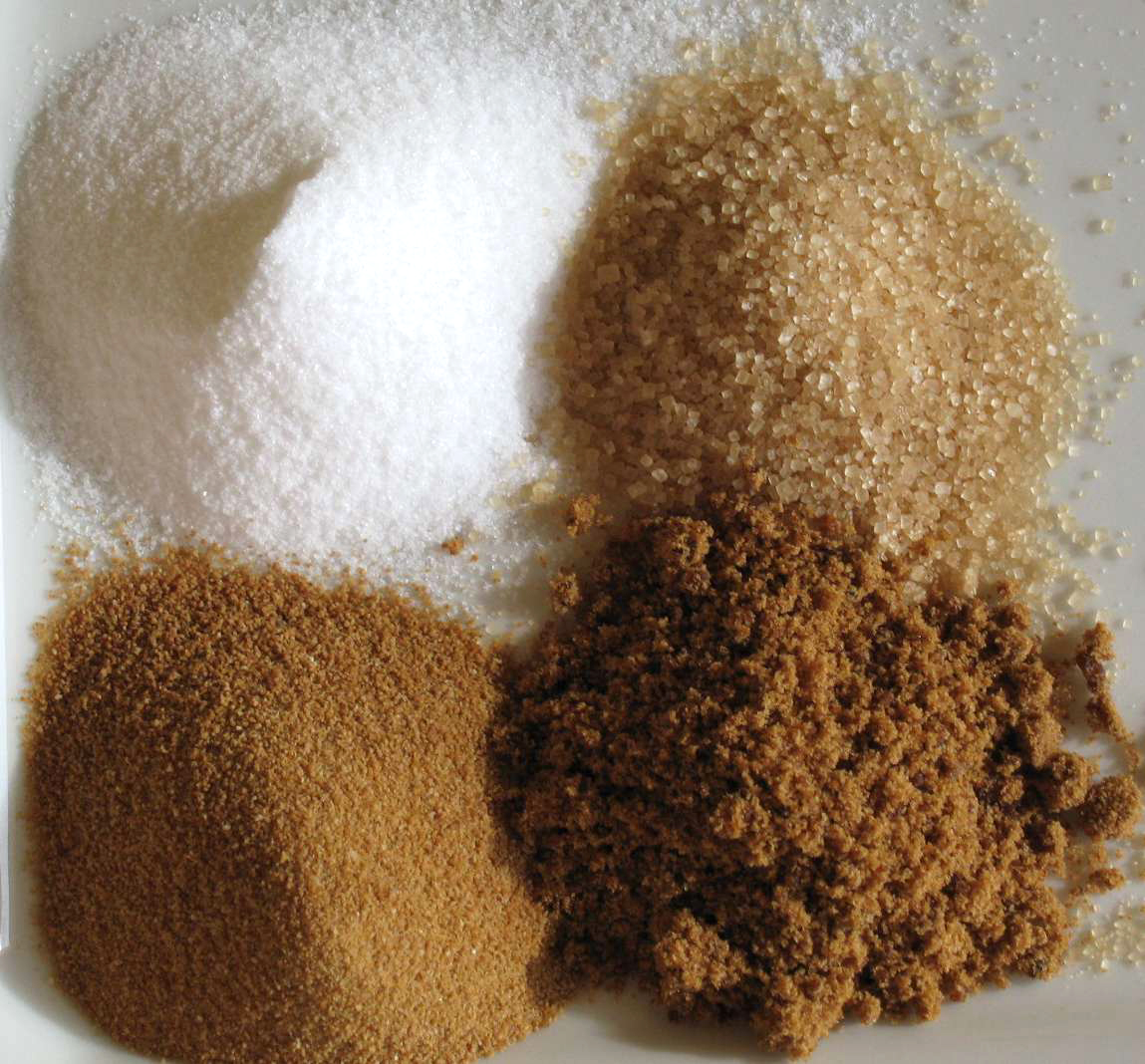
Sugars, clockwise from top left: white refined, unrefined, brown, unprocessed cane

== Legacy production ==
Following the 1994 Rwandan genocide, the new RPF government divested Kabuye Sugar Works, the only sugar factory in the country to the Madhvani Group of Uganda, in exchange for US$1.5 million. The factory produces between 10,000 and 15,000 metric tomes of brown sugar every year. The difference is imported from Uganda and from distant places including China and South America.

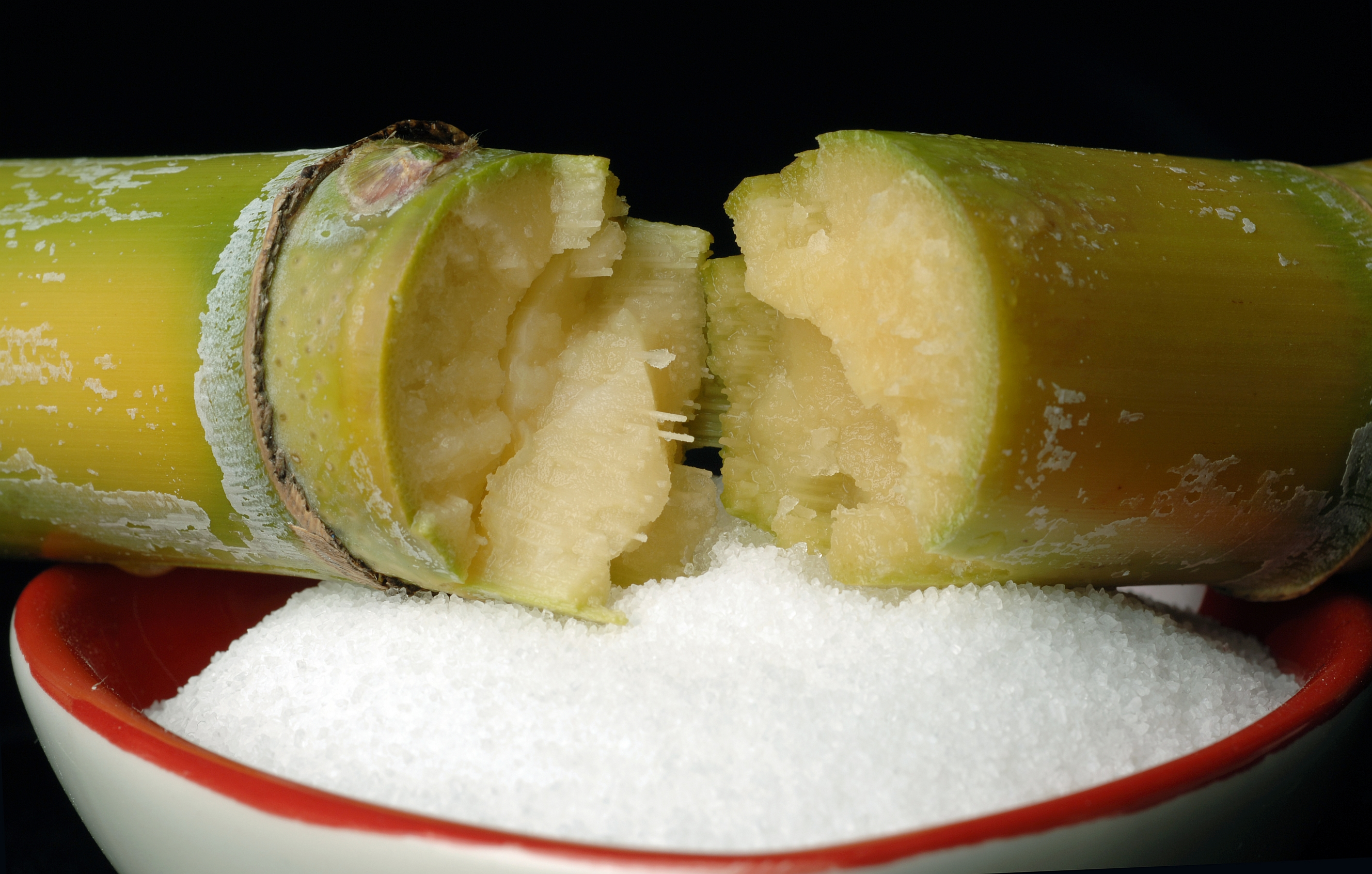
Sugar cane and bowl of sugar

== New planned production ==
The Madhvani Group plans to increase production at Kabuye to 55,000 metric tonnes annually. The upgrade involves new investment worth US$75 million (about Rwf60 billion), by the group. It includes the construction of a co-generation thermal power station with capacity of 12 megawatts (16,092 hp) and an ethanol production facility with capacity of 6 million litres (1,300,000 imp gal; 1,600,000 US gal) annually. More land is required to grow more cane to meet this goal. The government of Rwanda and the Madhvani Group have held discussions to bring this plan to fruition.

In August 2016, the government signed a memorandum of understanding with investors from Mauritius, to establish a new sugar factory in the Eastern Province of Rwanda, at an estimated cost of between US$250 million and US$300 million. Approximately 8 thousand acres (3,200 ha) of land is required to form a nucleus plantation, with out-growers supplying the rest of the required cane. A co-generation power plant with capacity of 25 megawatts (33,526 hp) is planned. Production capacity at this new facility is planned at 100,000 metric tonnes annually.

== See also ==
- Economy of Rwanda
- Agriculture in Rwanda
