= Lina Higiro =

Rwandan businesswoman

- Born: 1979 (age 46–47); Rwanda
- Education: North-West University (Bachelor of Commerce); University of Liverpool (Master of Business Administration); Ryerson University (Certificate in Business & Corporate Communications)
- Occupations: Businesswoman, bank executive
- Known for: Banking
- Title: Chief Executive of NCBA Bank Rwanda

Lina Mukashyaka Higiro is a Rwandan businesswoman and has been the chief executive officer of the NCBA Bank Rwanda since July 2018.

Immediately before her current assignment, since July 2016, she served as the chief operating officer of AB Bank Rwanda. In this role, she oversaw bank operations, transactional banking, business development and digital finance.

Prior to that, Higiro was the Head of Strategy, Planning and Marketing at I&M Bank, and before that she worked at Guaranty Trust Bank (at that time Fina Bank, as the Head of SME Banking, from 2007 until 2011.

== Background and education ==
She studied at North-West University, in South Africa, graduating with a Bachelor of Commerce degree. Later, she obtained a Master of Business Administration from the University of Liverpool in the United Kingdom. She also has a certificate in business and corporate communications, awarded by Ryerson University, in Toronto, Canada.

== See also ==
- List of banks in Rwanda
- Peace Uwase
- Alice Kalonzo–Zulu
