= Giro Commercial Bank =

- Company type: Private
- Industry: Financial services
- Founded: 1992
- Defunct: February 12, 2017
- Fate: Acquired by I&M Holdings
- Headquarters: Nairobi, Kenya
- Key people: C. J. Gidoomal; Chairman; Sanjay Gidoomal; Executive Director
- Products: Banking
- Website: www.girobankltd.com

Giro Commercial Bank, whose full name was Giro Commercial Bank Limited, was a commercial bank in Kenya it was acquired and absorbed by I&M Holdings in 2017. It was licensed by the Central Bank of Kenya, the central bank and national banking regulator.

As of December 2013, the total asset base of Giro Commercial Bank was valued at approximately KSh.13.623 billion/= (US$157.67 million), with shareholders' equity of approximately KSh.2.086 billion/= (US$24.15 million). Then, the bank held KSh.11.457 billion (US$132.6 million), in customer deposits. At that time, the bank was ranked number 29 out of 43 licensed banks in Kenya.

== History ==
Giro Commercial Bank traces its roots from Credit & Commerce Finance Limited (CCF), a non-bank financial entity founded in 1986. In 1992, the shareholders of CCF founded Giro Bank Limited to provided conventional banking services, while CCF retained its focus on hire purchase and trade finance. Due to the changing trends, regulatory requirements in the Kenyan banking industry, CCF obtained a commercial banking license from the Central Bank of Kenya in April 1996 and changed its name to Commerce Bank Ltd.

In 1998, Giro Bank and Commerce Bank merged to consolidate operations adopting the unified name Giro Commercial Bank Limited. The stock of the bank is privately owned by individuals and institutions.

On September 7, 2015, I&M Holdings announced the acquisition of Giro Commercial Bank. The acquisition was finalized in March 2017 and the operations of Giro Commercial Bank were merged to that of I&M Bank Kenya.

== Branch network ==
As of August 2014, the bank operated a network of branches at the following locations:

1. Head Office - Giro House, Eldama Park, Nairobi
2. Banda Street Branch - Hughes Building, Banda Street, Nairobi
3. Industrial Area Branch - Dunga Road, Industrial Area, Nairobi
4. Kisumu Branch - Giro House, Oginga Odinga Road, Kisumu
5. Mombasa Branch - Pan Africa House, Moi Avenue, Mombasa
6. Parklands Branch - 3rd Parklands Avenue, Ridge Court, Parklands, Nairobi
7. Westlands Branch - Bandari Plaza, Woodvale Grove, Westlands, Nairobi.

== See also ==
- CBK
- Kenya Banks
- Kenya Economy
- Kenyan shilling
- State Bank of India
