= I&M Bank Tower =

I&M Bank Tower Nairobi
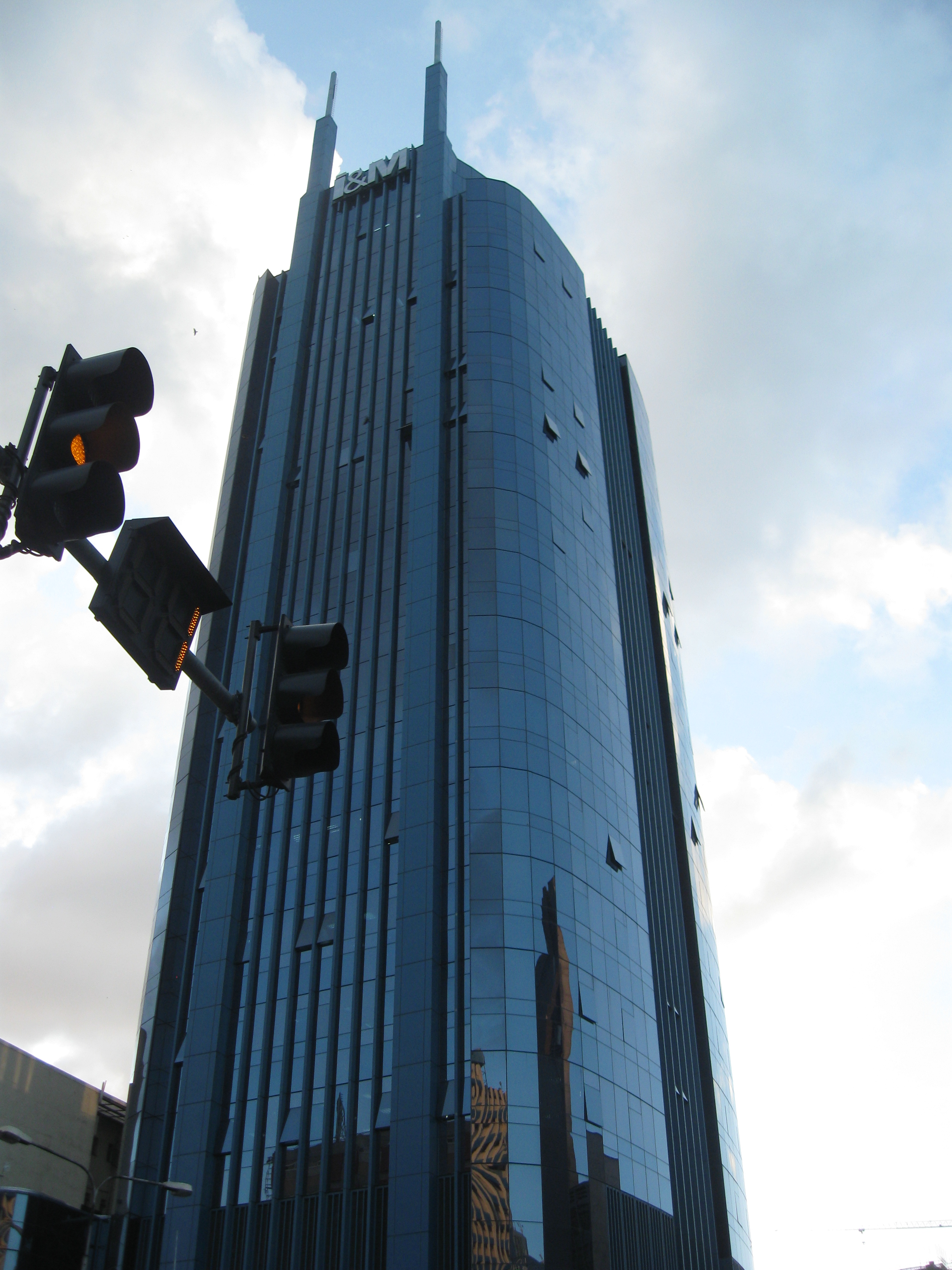
- I&M Bank Tower
- Interactive map of the I&M Bank Tower Nairobi area

General information
- Type: Commercial
- Location: Nairobi, Africa
- Coordinates: 1.284723°S 36.820000°E
- Completed: 1987

Height
- Antenna spire: 99 m (325 ft)
- Roof: 82 m (269 ft)

Technical details
- Floor count: 16
- Floor area: 8,500 m^{2} (91,000 sq ft)
- Lifts/elevators: 4 (and 1 escalator)

Design and construction
- Architect: Planning Systems Services
- Main contractor: Laxmanbhai Construction

The I&M Bank Tower is a skyscraper in Nairobi, Kenya's capital and largest city. It was designed and constructed by Laxmanbhai Construction LTD and designed by Planning Systems Services Ltd under Lee Hun Wan & Sons. Its original design was drawn from Amsterdam's whirl shaped traditional modeling.

== Location ==
The building is located on Kenyatta Avenue, in Nairobi's central business district, adjacent to the Kenyan headquarters of CFC Stanbic Bank. The coordinates of the building are:1°17'05.0"S, 36°49'12.0"E (Latitude:-1.284714; Longitude:36.819993).

== Overview ==
Completed in 2001, the tower is the main headquarters for I&M Bank Limited (I&M Bank), the lynchpin of the I&M Bank Group. In the past, the building also served as the headquarters of the Standard Group, which includes The Standard newspaper and Kenya Television Network station.

== See also ==
- I&M Bank Group
- List of banks in Kenya
- List of tallest buildings in Nairobi
- Nairobi
- Economy of Kenya
- Government Structure of Kenya
