= Diane Karusisi =

Rwandan economist and banker

- Born: 1975 (age 50–51)
- Citizenship: Rwandan
- Education: University of Fribourg (MSc in Econometrics) (PhD in Quantitative Economics)
- Occupation: Bank Executive
- Years active: 2000-present
- Known for: Business, management
- Title: CEO, Bank of Kigali

Dr. Diane Karusisi is a Rwandan statistician, economist, bank executive and academic. She is the CEO of Bank of Kigali, the largest commercial bank in Rwanda by assets. Immediately prior to her present position, she served as the chief economist and head of strategy and policy at the Office of the President of Rwanda.

== Background and education ==
Dr. Karusisi studied at the University of Fribourg in Switzerland, graduating with a Masters in Econometrics and a PhD in Quantitative Economics. Her doctoral thesis, published in 2009, is entitled "Dependency in credit portfolios: Modeling with copula functions".

== Career ==
From 2000 until 2006, Karusisi served as assistant professor of economic statistics at the University of Fribourg, Switzerland. From 2007 until 2009, she worked at Credit Suisse Asset Management in Zurich, as a fixed income portfolio engineer. In August 2009, she returned to Rwanda and was appointed as senior adviser to the director general of National Institute of Statistics of Rwanda (NISR). In September 2010, she became the director general of NISR. In that capacity, she oversaw the design and implementation of major surveys. In February 2016, Karusisi was appointed managing director and CEO of Bank of Kigali. She replaced James Gatera, who resigned after nearly nine years at the helm of Rwanda's largest commercial bank by assets.

== Other responsibilities ==
Dr. Karusisi also serves as vice chair of the board of the University of Rwanda. She also sits on the board of the Rwanda Development Board.

== See also ==
- List of banks in Rwanda
- List of banks in Africa
