= Eliya Zulu =

Malawian demographer

Eliya Msiyaphazi Zulu
- Born: Malawi
- Education: University of Malawi, Australia National University, University of Pennsylvania
- Occupations: Research Scientist, Demographer and Policy Analyst
- Title: Founder, Executive Director of AFIDEP
- Spouse: Alice Kilonzo-Zulu

Eliya Msiyaphazi Zulu is a Malawian born demographer and policy analyst who is the founder of the African Institute for Development Policy (AFIDEP). He is also the organization's Executive Director. He is known for his research in public health, poverty, and, and family planning (particularly, Acquired Immunodeficiency Syndrome), and human population.

== Education and career ==
Zulu went to college at the University of Malawi (Chancellor College) where he earned a Bachelor of Social Science in Economics and Applied Statistics in 1987. He then worked as a lecturer at the same college for 2 years. He then moved to Australia to pursues his master's degree from the Australian National University in Population and Development. Thereafter he returned to Malawi in 1991 to work as a lecturer at Chancellor College. His terminal degree is from the University of Pennsylvania in 1996 where he received a PhD in demography.

After completing his PhD, Zulu moved to Nairobi, Kenya to do a post-doctoral fellowship at the African Population and Health Research Center (APHRC), an organization founded by the Rockefeller Foundation. He later served as the Director of Research and deputy director at APHRC. He has also worked as the Director of Development Policy at Venture Strategies for Health and Development a non-profit in California. He founded the African Institute for Development in Kenya in 2010.

He is a member of the Royal Society and one of the researchers for the 2012 "People and the Planet" report which linked the global population, consumption and its impacts on the planet. Zulu is a member of the African Union committee on the Demographic Dividend.

== Founding AFIDEP ==
Zulu started the foundation work for the African Institute for Development Policy in 2009. The organization was registered in Kenya in 2010 with him as the executive director. AFIDEP has grown in to an influential research organization on the continent. Through the organization, he has been influencing data-driven policy in Kenya, Malawi, Uganda, Democratic Republic of Congo, Zambia and other nations on the continent. He currently serves as the organization's Executive Director.

=== Awards ===
The organization won the United Nations Population Fund award in 2023 for its impact on maternal health, sexual reproduction, and family planning in Africa.

== Selected publications ==
Zulu has published over 60 peer-reviewed articles.

- Zulu, Eliya Msiyaphazi; F. Nii-Amoo Dodoo; Alex Chika-Ezeh (2002). "Sexual risk-taking in the slums of Nairobi, Kenya, 1993–98". Population Studies. 56 (3): 311–323.
- Zulu, Eliya Msiyaphazi; Gloria Chepngeno (2003). "Spousal communication about the risk of contracting HIV/AIDS in rural Malawi". Demographic Research. 1: 247–278.
- Zulu, Eliya Msiyaphazi (2001). "Ethnic variations in observance and rationale for postpartum sexual abstinence in Malawi". Demography. 38 (4): 467–479.
- Zulu, Eliya Msiyaphazi (1996). Sociocultural factors affecting reproductive behavior in Malawi (PhD thesis). University of Pennsylvania.
