= BPR Bank Rwanda =

Commercial bank in Rwanda

BPR Bank Rwanda Plc.
- Company type: Subsidiary of KCB Group
- Industry: Financial services
- Founded: 1975; 51 years ago
- Headquarters: Kigali, Rwanda
- Key people: George Rubagumya (chairman); Patience Mutesi (managing director)
- Products: Loans, checking, savings, investments, debit cards
- Revenue: ▲ Aftertax: RWF25.8 billion (US$19.8 million) (2023)
- Total assets: RWF: 860 billion (US$660 million) (2023)
- Number of employees: 1,300+ (2022)
- Website: bpr.rw

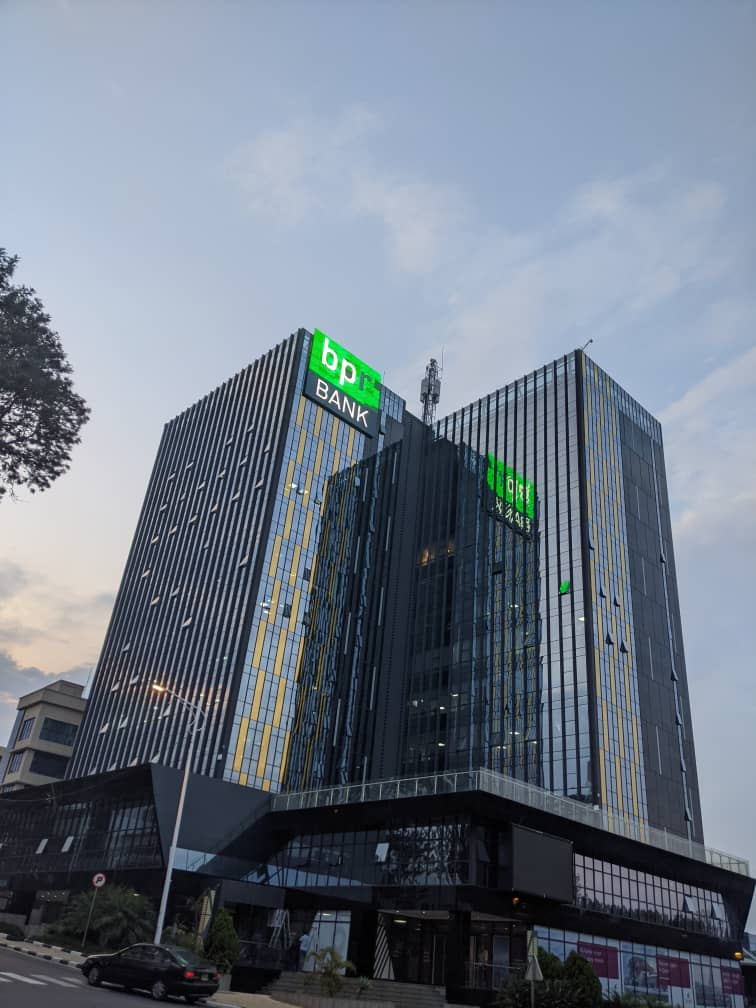
BPR Bank in Rwanda

BPR Bank Rwanda (Kinyarwanda: Banki y'Abaturage y'u Rwanda), formerly Banque Populaire du Rwanda SA, is a commercial bank in Rwanda. The bank is licensed by the National Bank of Rwanda, the central bank and national banking regulator.

== Overview ==
BPR is a retail (consumer) bank, offering products that include current and savings accounts, debit and credit cards, mortgages and loans. The bank offers consumer banking tools like mobile banking, as well as agricultural business expertise to corporate customers in the food and agri-business value chain.

As of May 2022, BPR Bank Rwanda Plc was a large financial services provider in Rwanda. Its total asset valuation was RWF:648 billion (US$642 million), with 154 networked branches.

In 2016, BPR employed about 1,400 staff at that time. In May 2022, the Rwanda Banker's Association reported that BPR Bank Rwanda Plc., employed over 1,300 people.

In 2021, KCB Group successfully completed the acquisition of Banque Populaire du Rwanda Plc (BPR) from Atlas Mara Mauritius Limited and Arise B.V. In 2022, in line with its strategy for expansion and enhanced financial inclusion across the region, KCB Group successfully amalgamated Banque Populaire du Rwanda and KCB Bank Rwanda Plc to form BPR Bank Rwanda Plc. The success of this merger makes BPR Bank Rwanda Plc the second largest bank in the Rwanda banking sector. It is reported that KCB Group spent about KSh:6.3 billion (approx. US$55 million) in the acquisition process.

== History ==
The origins of the bank can be traced back to 1975, when the first Banque Populaire du Rwanda was formed in the settlement of Nkamba, in the city of Kibungo, Eastern Province. Over the next ten years, many other similar banks were founded around the country. In 1986, the various autonomous Banques Populaires formed an umbrella called the Union des Banques Populaires du Rwanda (UBPR). UBPR was operated as a cooperative bank.

In January 2008, following 33 years of experience in the Rwandan financial sector, UBPR was transformed from a cooperative bank into a commercial bank: Banque Populaire du Rwanda S.A. In June 2008, Rabobank, the Dutch cooperative banking conglomerate, acquired 35 percent of the shares in BPR. In July 2012, Visa Inc. certified the bank to issue visa-branded debit and credit cards.

In January 2016, Atlas Mara completed its acquisition of a controlling stake of BPR after acquiring shares from existing shareholders and merging the bank with the commercial banking business that was spun off Rwanda Development Bank.

In 2021, KCB Group successfully completed the acquisition of Banque Populaire du Rwanda Plc (BPR) from Atlas Mara Mauritius Limited and Arise B.V. In 2022, in line with its strategy for expansion and enhanced financial inclusion across the region, KCB Group successfully amalgamated Banque Populaire du Rwanda and KCB Bank Rwanda Plc to form BPR Bank Rwanda Plc. The success of this merger makes BPR Bank Rwanda Plc the second largest bank in the Rwanda banking sector. It is reported that KCB Group spent about KSh:6.3 billion (approx. US$55 million) in the acquisition process.

== Ownership ==
As of September 2022 the bank's stock was owned by the following shareholders, as outlined in the table below:

Banque Populaire du Rwanda stock ownership
Rank	Name of owner	Percentage ownership
1	KCB Group	87.5
3	Other minority shareholders	12.5
	Total	100.00

== Branch network ==
As of May 2022, BPR Bank Plc maintained a network of 154 full-service branches, and over 100 ATMs in all regions of Rwanda.

== Governance ==
The activities of BPR Bank Plc are supervised by a seven-member board of directors representing commercial activities, operations, risk and the branch network, headed by the managing director. The current chairman of the board is George Rubagumya. The day-to-day affairs of the bank are managed by a fifteen-member executive team, led by the managing director, Patience Mutesi.

== See also ==
- List of banks in Rwanda
- Economy of Rwanda
