= Michael Shirima =

Tanzanian businessman (1943–2023

- Born: 1 January 1943; Rombo, Northern Province, Tanganyika Territory
- Died: 9 June 2023 (aged 80); Aga Khan Hospital, Dar es Salaam, Tanzania
- Citizenship: Tanzania
- Occupations: Businessman & entrepreneur
- Years active: 1993–2023
- Known for: Investments, Business

Michael Ngaleku Shirima (1 January 1943 – 9 June 2023) was a Tanzanian businessman, entrepreneur, and philanthropist. He was the founder and chairman of Precision Air, Tanzania's largest privately owned airline. He served in that role from 1993 until his death on 9 June 2023, at the age of 80.

== Background ==
Shirima was born in Usseri Rombo District, Kilimanjaro Region, Tanzania. He studied in Tanzanian schools for his pre-university education. He studied at the University College Nairobi (now the University of Nairobi). Later he graduated as a certified aircraft performance engineer, from the Aviation College, Perth, Scotland.

== Career ==
After his studies, Shirima found employment with the defunct East African Airways (EAC). When the first EAC collapsed in 1977, he was one of executives who started the Air Tanzania Corporation (ATC), which today is the national carrier Air Tanzania Company Limited (ATCL).

On 10 January 1979, he resigned as the Executive Director of Operations, due to "excessive political interference in the operations of the airline". After starting a cropdusting service, using a leased airplane, he began coffee growing, processing and export.

Shirima started Precision Air in 1993, with a twin-engine five-seater airplane, a Piper Aztec. Using Arusha as its base, the airline began by providing charter flights to tourists visiting Serengeti National Park, Ngorongoro Crater, the island of Unguja, and other tourist attractions in Tanzania. As customer numbers grew, the airline acquired more equipment and began scheduled flights maintaining Arusha as its base. In 2003, Kenya Airways, the largest airline in East Africa, acquired 49 percent shareholding in Precision Air for a cash sum of US$2 million. The shares of stock of Precision Air were listed on the Dar es Salaam Stock Exchange (DSE). As of July 2015, Tanzanian media reports indicated that Michael Shirima was the largest shareholder in the stock of the airline.

== Other responsibilities ==
In addition to his aviation interests, Shirima owned 4.98 percent of the stock of I&M Bank (Tanzania), a medium-sized commercial bank. As of December 2021, the bank's total assets were valued at about TZS:587.09 billion (about US$248.12 million), as of 31 December 2021. Then, 16.63 percent of total assets were shareholders' funds, which calculated out to TZS:97,633,067,000 (about US$41.26 million), according to the bank's annual report for calendar year 2021. At that time Michael Shirima's shareholding in I&M Bank (Tanzania) was valued at TZS:4,862,126,377 (about US$2.055 million). Shirima also sat on the bank's board of directors until his death.

He was the founder and proprietor of Cornelius Ngaleku Orphanage, located in Useri Division, Rombo District, Kilimanjaro Region, in northern Tanzania. The orphanage looks after homeless children picked up on the streets of Tanzanian cities. Shirima also served as the Chairman of Tanzania Golf Union (TGU).

== Books authored ==
Shirima's autobiography "On My Father's Wings: An Entrepreneurial Journey of Finding Humility, Resiliency, and a Lasting Legacy" was published in 2022.

== See also ==
- Kenya Airways
- I&M Holdings Limited
