= Kigali International Financial Centre =

Rwandan financial centre

- Industry: Banking, financial services, insurance, wealth & asset management, brokerage & capital markets, professional service providers, corporate offices and retailers
- Founded: 2020
- Headquarters: Rwanda
- Key people: Tidjane Thiam, board chairman Nick Barigye, chief executive officer
- Website: kifc.rw

Kigali International Financial Centre (KIFC) is a financial centre that is intended to transform Rwanda into an international financial destination for investors seeking opportunities across the African continent.

== Inclusive Fintech Forum ==
KIFC and Elevandi of the Monetary Authority of Singapore organised the first Inclusive Fintech Forum to enhance the fintech ecosystem from June 20 to 22, 2023 in Kigali, Rwanda.
