= Economy of Rwanda =

Economy of
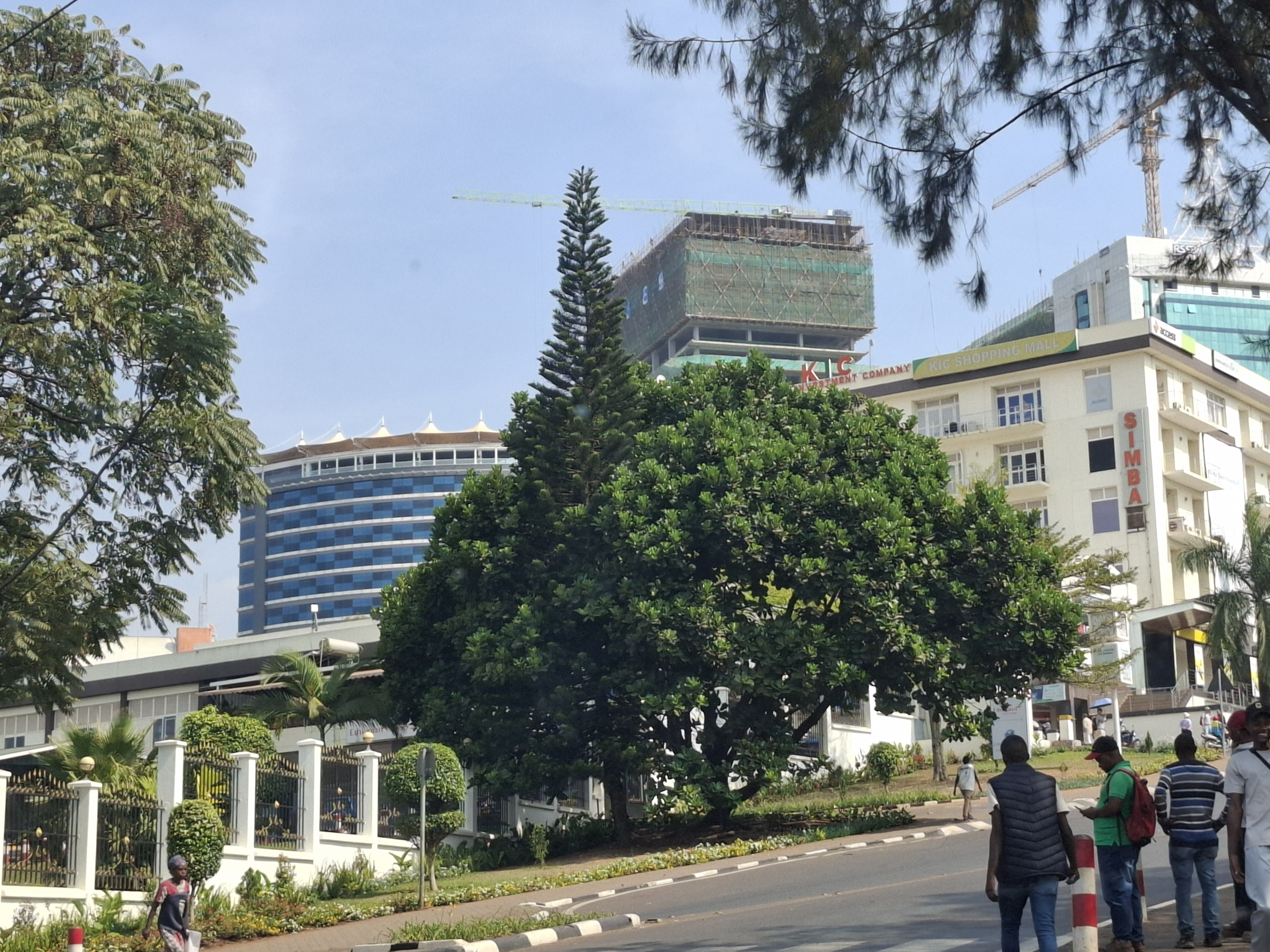
- Kigali, the financial centre of Rwanda
- Currency: Rwandan franc (RWF, FRw)
- Fiscal year: Calendar year
- Trade organisations: AU, AfCFTA, EAC, COMESA, WTO
- Country group: Least developed country; Low-income economy

Statistics
- Population: ▲13,798,561 (2024 proj.)
- GDP: ▲$14.77 billion (nominal; 2025 est.); ▲$58.12 billion (PPP; 2025 est.)
- GDP rank: 140th (nominal, 2024); 132nd (PPP, 2024)
- GDP growth: ▲7.5% (2026f); ▲7.4% (2027f)
- GDP per capita: ▲$1,040 (nominal, 2025 est.); ▲$4,100 (PPP, 2025.)
- GDP per capita rank: 173rd (nominal, 2024); 163rd (PPP, 2024)
- GDP by sector: Agriculture: 20%; Industry: 22%; Services: 52% (2025)
- Inflation (CPI): 6.3% (2025 est.)
- Population below national poverty line: 38.2% (2016 est.); 52% on less than $1.90/day (2016 est.)
- Gini coefficient: 39.4 medium (2023)
- Human Development Index: ▲0.578 medium (2023) (165th); ▲0.399 low IHDI (2023)
- Labour force: ▲5,258,826 (2023); ▲64.1% employment rate (Q3, 2024)
- Labour force by occupation: Services: 44.4%; Market agriculture: 39.1%; Industry: 16.5%

Public finance
- Credit rating: S&P Global Ratings: B+/B; Outlook: Stable; Moody's: B2; Outlook: Stable; Fitch: B+; Outlook: Negative
- All values, unless otherwise stated, are in US dollars.

Rwanda has a developing economy. It is a low-income developmental state based on services, agriculture and industry. It has been described as undergoing early industrialisation due to newer government policies. It has a mixed economy. Since the early 2000s, Rwanda has witnessed an economic boom, which improved the living standards of many Rwandans. The president of Rwanda, Paul Kagame, has noted his ambition to make Rwanda the "Singapore of Africa". In 2025 the economy grew by 9.4%; services contributed 52% of GDP, industry 22% and agriculture 20%.

== History ==
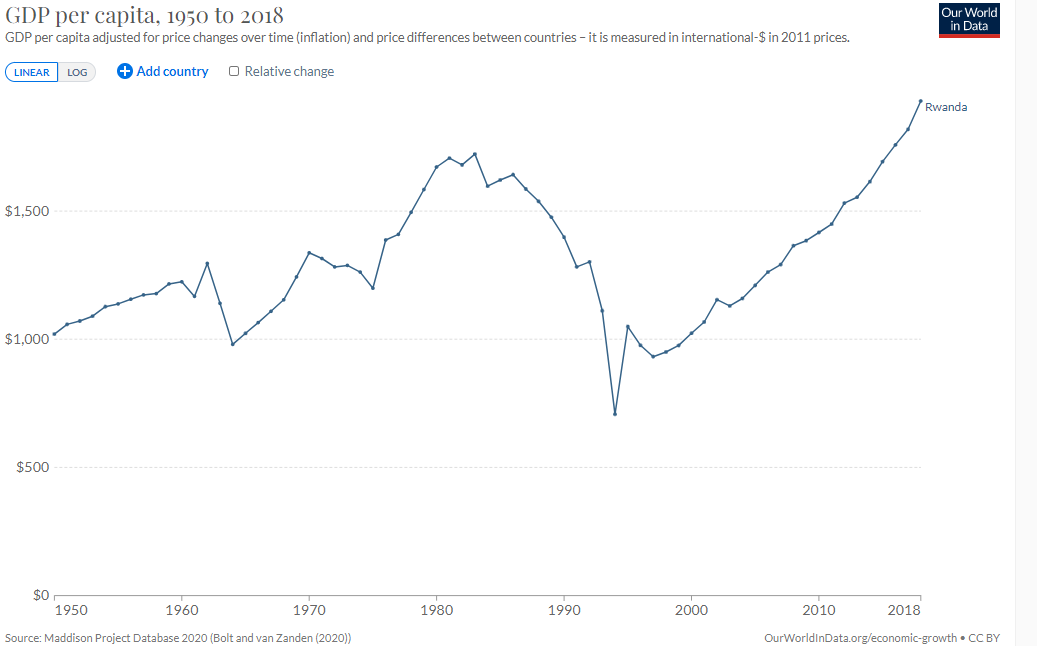
Estimated development of real GDP per capita in Rwanda, since 1950

=== Before the civil war and genocide ===
In the 1960s and 1970s, Rwanda's prudent financial policies, coupled with generous external aid and relatively favorable terms of trade, resulted in sustained growth in per capita income and low inflation rates. However, when world coffee prices fell sharply in the 1980s, growth became erratic.

Compared to an annual GDP growth rate of 6.5% from 1973 to 1980, growth slowed to an average of 2.9% a year from 1980 through 1985 and was stagnant from 1986 to 1990. The crisis peaked in 1990 when the first measures of an IMF structural adjustment programme were carried out. While the programme was not fully implemented before the war, key measures such as two large devaluations and the removal of official prices were enacted. The consequences on salaries and purchasing power were rapid and dramatic. This crisis particularly affected the educated elite, most of whom were employed in civil service or state-owned enterprises.

During the 5 years of civil war that culminated in the 1994 genocide, GDP declined in 3 out of 5 years, posting a rapid decline at more than 40% in 1994, the year of the genocide. The 9% increase in real GDP for 1995, the first postwar year, signaled the resurgence of economic activity.

=== After the genocide (1994–2005) ===
The 1994 genocide destroyed Rwanda's fragile economic base, severely impoverished the population, particularly women, and eroded the country's ability to attract private and external investment. However, Rwanda has made significant progress in stabilizing and rehabilitating its economy. In June 1998, Rwanda signed an Enhanced Structural Adjustment Facility with the International Monetary Fund. Rwanda has also embarked upon an ambitious privatization programme with the World Bank.

In the immediate postwar period—mid-1994 through 1995—emergency humanitarian assistance of more than $307.4 million was largely directed to relief efforts in Rwanda and in the refugee camps in neighbouring countries where Rwandans fled during the war. In 1996, humanitarian relief aid began to shift to reconstruction and development assistance.

The United States, Belgium, Germany, the Netherlands, France, the People's Republic of China, the World Bank, the UN Development Programme and the European Development Fund will continue to account for the substantial aid. Rehabilitation of government infrastructure, in particular the justice system, was an international priority, as well as the continued repair and expansion of infrastructure, health facilities, and schools.

After the Rwandan Genocide, the Tutsi-led government began a major programme to improve the country's economy and reduce its dependence on subsistence farming. The failing economy had been a major factor behind the genocide, as was overpopulation and the resulting competition for scarce farmland and other resources. The government focused primarily on building up its manufacturing and service industries and eliminating barriers to trade and development.

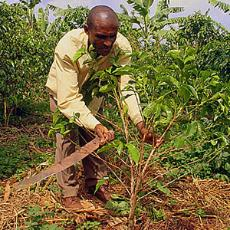
A coffee farmer in Rwanda

The Government of Rwanda posted a 13% GDP growth rate in 1996 through improved collection of tax revenues, accelerated privatization of state enterprises to stop the drain on government resources, and continued improvement in export crop and food production. Tea plantations and factories continue to be rehabilitated, and coffee, always a smallholder's crop, is being more seriously rehabilitated and tended as the farmers' sense of security returns.

Coffee production of 14,578,560 tonnes in 2000 compares to a pre-civil war variation between 35,000 and 40,000 tonnes. By 2002 tea became Rwanda's largest export, with export earnings from tea reaching US$18 million equating to 15,000 tonnes of dried tea. Rwanda's natural resources are limited. A small mineral industry provides about 5% of foreign exchange earnings. Concentrates exist of the heavy minerals cassiterite (a primary source of tin), and coltan (used to manufacture electronic capacitors, used in consumer electronics products such as cell phones, DVD players, video game systems and computers).

By mid-1997, up to 75% of the factories functioning before the war had returned to production, at an average of 75% of their capacity. Investments in the industrial sector continue to mostly be limited to the repair of existing industrial plants. Retail trade, devastated by the war, has revived quickly, with many new small businesses established by Rwandan returnees from Uganda, Burundi, and the Democratic Republic of the Congo.

Industry received little external assistance from the end of the war through 1995. Beginning in 1996–97, the government became increasingly active in helping the industrial sector to restore production through technical and financial assistance, including loan guarantees, economic liberalization, and the privatization of state-owned enterprises. In early 1998, the government set up a one-stop investment promotion centre and implemented a new investment code that created an enabling environment for foreign and local investors. An autonomous revenue authority also has begun operation, improving collections and accountability.

Cassiterite production peaked at 1,000 tonnes in 1990, but was under 700 tonnes in 2000. Recorded coltan production has soared from 147 tonnes in 1999 to 1,300 tonnes in 2001, and coltan was the country's biggest single export earner in 2001. At least part of the increase in production is because of new mines opening up in Rwanda. However it is true, as has frequently been observed, that the increase is also because of the fraudulent re-export of Congolese coltan. In addition to the well-publicised involvement in this trade of the Rwandan Defence Force (RDF), another important factor in the coltan re-export is that international dealers are under pressure not to buy from the DRC, thus increasing the incentive for DRC coltan to be re-exported as Rwanda's. Rwanda is also alleged to be trading in fraudulently exported gold and diamonds from the DRC.

=== 2006–present ===
The country entered a high period of economic growth in 2006, and the following year managed to register 8% economic growth, a record it has sustained since, turning it into one of the fastest-growing economies in Africa. This sustained economic growth has succeeded in reducing poverty and also reducing fertility rates, with growth between 2006 and 2011 reducing the percentage of the country's population living in poverty from 57% to 45%.The country's infrastructure has also grown rapidly, with connections to electricity going from 91,000 in 2006 to 215,000 in 2011. Rwanda wants to achieve Middle Income Country status by 2035 and High-Income Country status by 2050.

Existing foreign investment is concentrated in commercial establishments, mining, tea, coffee, and tourism. Minimum wage and social security regulations are in force, and the four prewar independent trade unions are back in operation. The largest union, CESTRAR, was created as an organ of the government but became fully independent with the political reforms introduced by the 1991 constitution.

In 2016, Rwanda was ranked 42nd and second best country in Africa to do business in the Mara Foundation's Ashish J. Thakkar Global Entrepreneurship Index report. As of 2020, it is ranked 38th best for doing business, and remains the second best country in Africa for doing business by the World Bank Ease of Doing Business Index. Upon elimination of this ranking, the World Bank published a new index, B-READY, in 2024; evaluating countries on their overall attractiveness and business readiness. Rwanda currently ranks 13th, just below Hong Kong, of 50 countries.

However, research in the UK-based political science journal, Review of African Political Economy, indicates that economic growth may be slower than what official figures suggest. Researchers stated that average consumption per household closely followed growth in GDP per capita from 2000 to 2005, but diverged afterwards when average consumption per household stagnated despite huge improvements in GDP per capita from 2005 to 2013. From 2006 to 2026, Rwanda has sustained a growth rate oscillating between six and nine percent, with the exception of the COVID pandemic, where GDP contracted 2.5%. One risk to future GDP growth in the country, despite generous incentives to attract foreign investment, including a 0% corporate income tax for qualifying firms, the political environment which has been under one-party leadership since 1994 and the ongoing conflict with neighboring DRC.

== Agriculture and primary resources ==
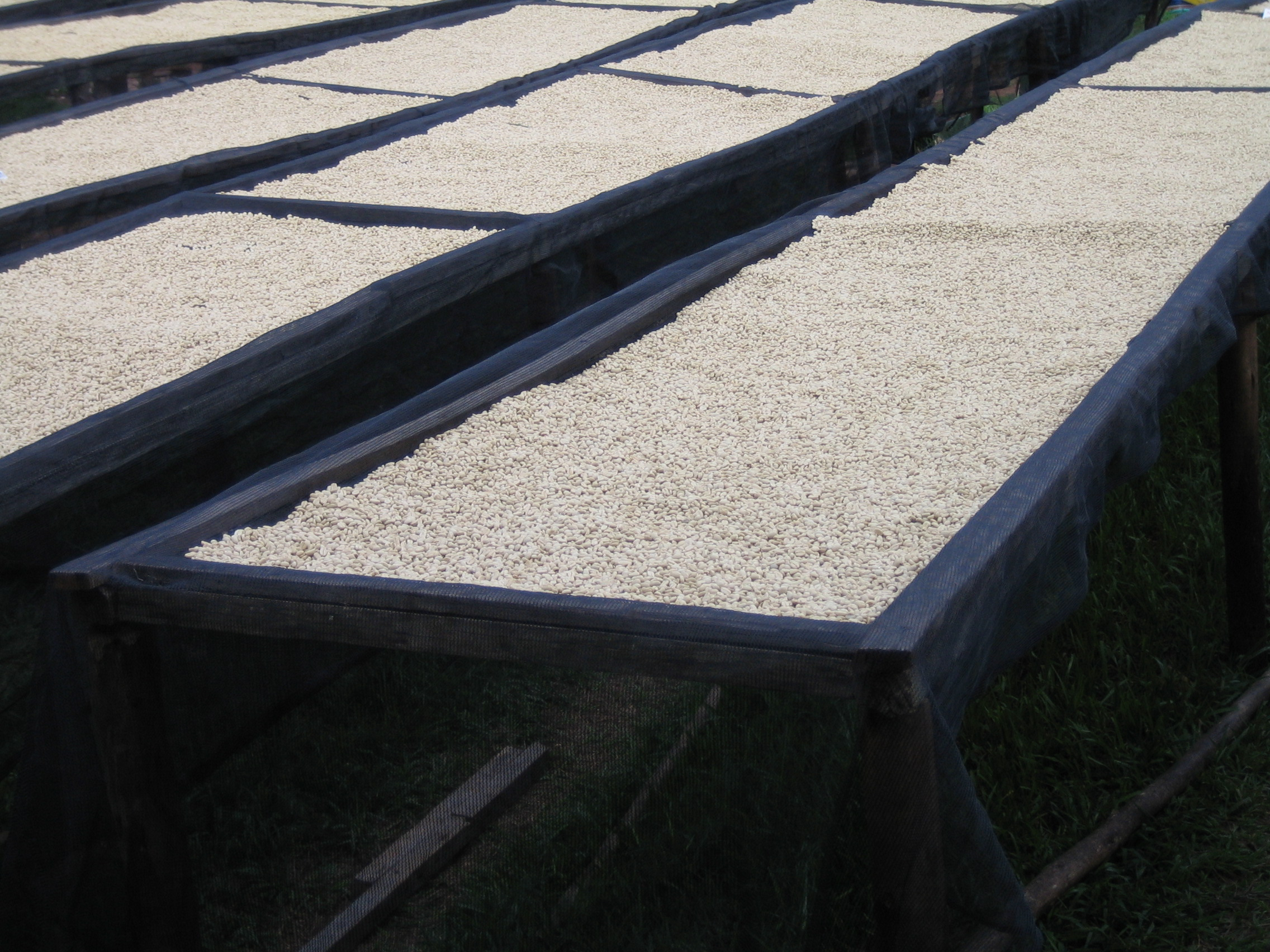
Coffee beans drying in Maraba. Coffee is one of Rwanda's major cash crops.

Rwanda has the tenth highest proportion of women working in agriculture, forestry and fishing in the world.

Crops grown in the country include coffee, tea, pyrethrum, bananas, beans, sorghum and potatoes. Coffee and tea are the major cash crops for export, with the high altitudes, steep slopes and volcanic soils providing favourable conditions. Reliance on agricultural exports makes Rwanda vulnerable to shifts in their prices. Agriculture accounted for 29% of the economy of Rwanda in 2019, falling to 20% of GDP by 2025, although the sector itself grew by 7% that year. Rwanda produced in 2019: Bananas, pineapples, tea, coffee, and tobacco are high-value, export-oriented products.

- 2.6 million tonnes of banana
- 1.2 million tonnes of sweet potato
- 1.1 million tonnes of cassava
- 973 thousand tonnes of potato
- 484 thousand tonnes of beans
- 421 thousand tonnes of maize
- 256 thousand tonnes of pumpkin
- 171 thousand tonnes of taro
- 159 thousand tonnes of sorghum
- 131 thousand tonnes of rice
- 114 thousand tonnes of sugarcane
- 105 thousand tonnes of tomato
- 36 thousand tonnes of pineapple
- 31 thousand tonnes of tea
- 29 thousand tonnes of coffee
- 5.4 thousand tonnes of tobacco

Rwanda's economy suffered heavily during the 1994 Genocide, with widespread loss of life, failure to maintain the infrastructure, looting, and neglect of important cash crops. This caused a large drop in GDP and destroyed the country's ability to attract private and external investment. The economy has since strengthened, with per-capita GDP (PPP) estimated at $2,225 in 2018, compared with $416 in 1994. Major export markets include China, Germany, and the United States. The economy is managed by the central National Bank of Rwanda and the currency is the Rwandan franc; in June 2010, the exchange rate was 588 francs to the United States dollar. Rwanda joined the East African Community in 2007 and there were plans for a common East African shilling, which it had been hoped would be in place by 2015, but have not yet reached fruition (2020).

Rwanda is a country of few natural resources, and the economy is based mostly on subsistence agriculture by local farmers using simple tools. An estimated 90% of the working population farms, and agriculture comprised an estimated 42.0% of GDP in 2010. Since the mid-1980s, farm sizes and food production have been decreasing, due in part to the resettlement of displaced people. Despite Rwanda's fertile ecosystem, food production often does not keep pace with population growth, and food imports are required.

Agricultural animals raised in Rwanda include cows, goats, sheep, pigs, chicken, and rabbits, with geographical variation in the numbers of each. Production systems are mostly traditional, although there are a few intensive dairy farms around Kigali. Shortages of land and water, insufficient and poor-quality feed, and regular disease epidemics with insufficient veterinary services are major constraints that restrict output. A "One Cow per Poor Family Programme" (Girinka), implemented in 2006, distributed 341,065 cows in 2018.

Fishing takes place on the country's lakes, but stocks are very depleted, and live fish are being imported in an attempt to revive the industry.

== Mining ==
Rwanda's mining industry is an important contributor, generating US$93 million in 2008. Minerals mined include cassiterite, wolframite, sapphires, gold, and coltan, which is used in the manufacture of electronic and communication devices such as mobile phones. Production of methane from Lake Kivu began in 1983, but to date has been used only by the Bralirwa Brewery.

In 2019, the country was the 7th largest world producer of tungsten and the 12th largest world producer of tin.

== Energy and electrification ==
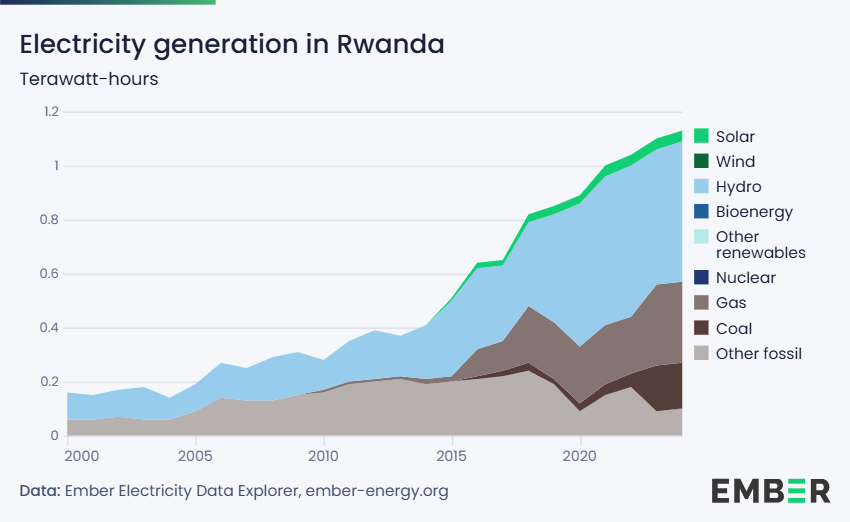
Electricity generation in Rwanda in terawatt-hours

Rwanda has made tremendous strides in improving electrification in the 21st century. A great number of new areas has become electrified through an expansion of infrastructure.

Depletion of the forests will eventually pressure Rwandans to turn to fuel sources other than charcoal for cooking and heating. Given the abundance of mountain streams and lakes, the potential for hydroelectric power is substantial. Rwanda is exploiting these natural resources through joint hydroelectric projects with Burundi and the Democratic Republic of the Congo.

== Manufacturing ==
Rwanda's manufacturing sector is dominated by the production of import substitutes for internal consumption. The larger enterprises produce beer, soft drinks, cigarettes, hoes, wheelbarrows, soap, mattresses, plastic pipe, roofing materials, and bottled water. Other products manufactured include agricultural products, small-scale beverages, soap, furniture, shoes, cement, plastic goods, textiles and cigarettes.

== Financial services ==
Rwanda is positioning itself as a regional hub for financial services through the Kigali International Financial Centre (KIFC). The Rwanda Stock Exchange (RSE) serves as the principal capital market, with a market capitalization of approximately FRW 4.6 trillion (US$3.1 billion) as of 2025.

The banking sector is regulated by the National Bank of Rwanda (BNR). The sector is dominated by a mix of local and regional commercial banks, namely Bank of Kigali, I&M Bank Rwanda, BPR Bank Rwanda (part of KCB Group), Equity Bank Rwanda, and Ecobank. The Bank of Kigali (BK Group) remains the largest bank in Rwanda by asset size and market share, controlling approximately 33% of the banking sector's total assets as of 2024.

Rwanda enjoys the presence of a number of high-profile accounting firms. Major international networks such as PwC, KPMG, and EY maintain active offices in Kigali and are responsible for auditing the majority of large financial institutions. As of 2025, other major networks operating in the country include BDO, Grant Thornton International, and PKF International, which are fully licensed by the Institute of Certified Public Accountants of Rwanda (iCPAR).

== Tourism and services ==
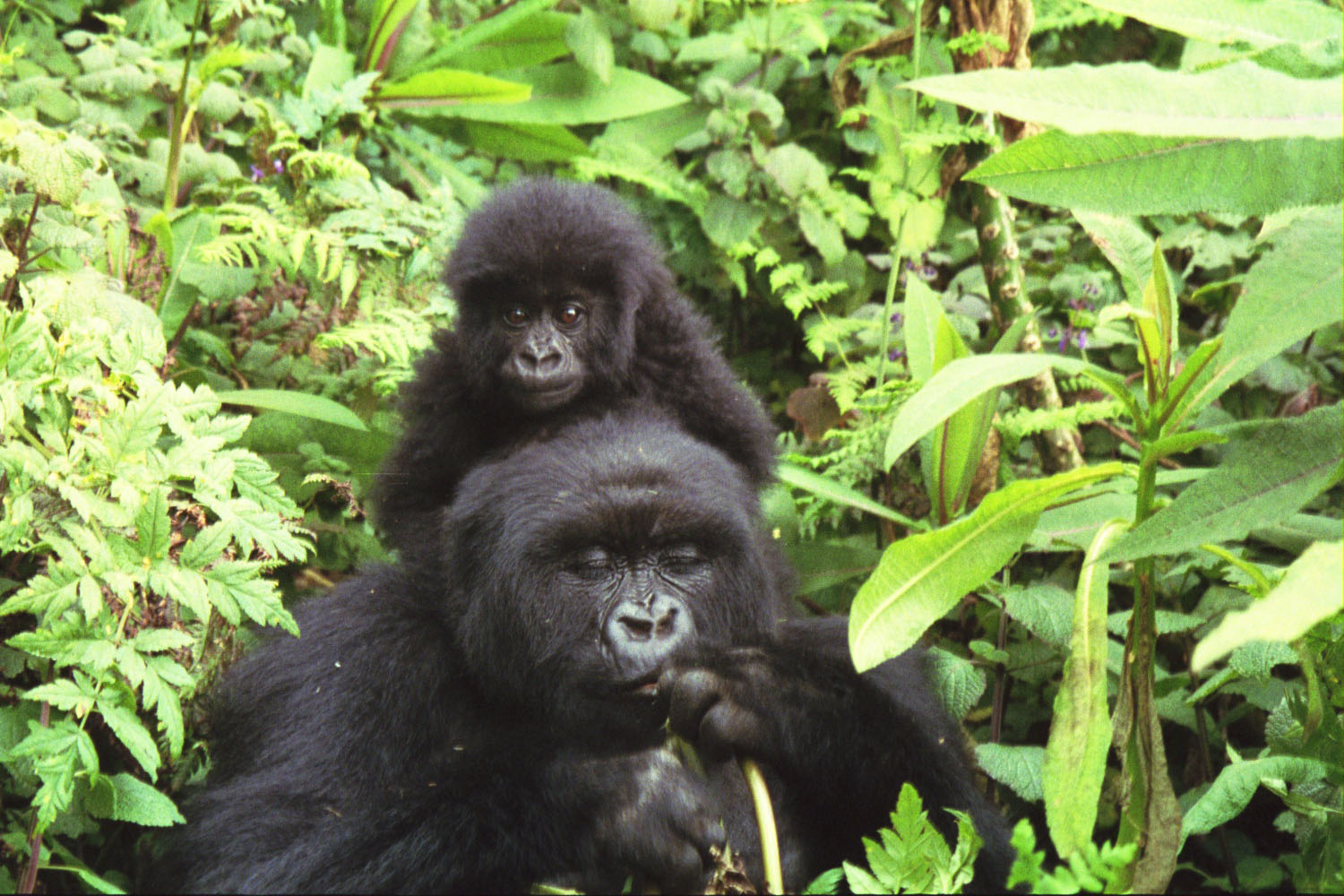
Mountain gorillas in Volcanoes National Park

Rwanda's service sector suffered during the late 2000s recession as banks reduced lending and foreign aid projects and investment were reduced. The sector rebounded in 2010, becoming the country's largest sector by economic output and contributing 43.6% of the country's GDP. By 2025, services accounted for 52% of GDP. Key tertiary contributors include banking and finance, wholesale and retail trade, hotels and restaurants, transport, storage, communication, insurance, real estate, business services and public administration including education and health.

Tourism is one of the fastest-growing economic resources and became the country's leading foreign exchange earner in 2011. In spite of the genocide's legacy, the country is increasingly perceived internationally as a safe destination; The Directorate of Immigration and Emigration recorded 405,801 people visiting the country between January and June 2011; 16% of these arrived from outside Africa. Revenue from tourism was US$115,600,000 between January and June 2011; holidaymakers contributed 43% of this revenue, despite being only 9% of the numbers.

Rwanda is one of only two countries in which mountain gorillas can be visited safely; gorilla tracking in the Volcanoes National Park attracts thousands of visitors per year, who are prepared to pay high prices for permits. Other attractions include: Nyungwe Forest, home to chimpanzees, Ruwenzori colobus and other primates, the resorts of Lake Kivu, and Akagera, a small savanna reserve in the east of the country.

Rwanda's tourism is centred on the attractions of Volcanoes National Park with its five volcanoes and the protected population of mountain gorillas made famous by Dian Fossey. Additionally, tourism is drawn to east-central Africa's largest protected wetland, Akagera National Park, with its populations of Big 5 (including lions and rhinos), hippopotami, Cape buffalo, zebras, elephants, and elands. Birdwatching is also a major draw, especially in Nyungwe National Park, one of the largest uncut forest reserves in Africa, home to over 300 bird species and a vast variety of wildlife.

Several memorial sites associated with the Rwandan genocide have begun to generate significant dark tourism. For example, the Gisozi Genocide Memorial Site in the Gasabo District of Kigali—the burial place of approximately 300,000 victims of the genocide—has a related genocide exhibition area and library and has plans to develop a teaching centre on the history of the genocide. Another major genocide-related memorial centre attracting tourists is the Murambi Genocide Memorial Site housed in the former Murambi Technical School where 45,000 people were murdered and 850 skeletons and mummified remains of the victims are on display.

Two other major memorial sites associated with the genocide are in Kicukiro District: Rebero Genocide Memorial Site where 14,400 victims are buried and the Nyanza-Kicukiro Genocide Memorial Site where 5,000 victims were killed after Belgian soldiers who serving in the United Nations peacekeeping forces abandoned them. In Kibungo Province, the site of the Nyarubuye Massacre is home to the Nyarubuye Genocide Memorial Site where an estimated 20,000 victims were killed after seeking refuge in the Roman Catholic church and homes of the nuns and priest there.

Import documentation is published on the Rwanda Trade Portal and includes the bill of lading or air waybill, the commercial invoice, a packing list and an import declaration form. Submission of the declaration form through the electronic single window is mandatory, and paper forms are no longer accepted except in contingencies specified by the government.

== Historical statistics ==
=== GDP per capita (nominal) ===
Historical evolution of GDP per capita (nominal) of Rwanda during the period 1980-2030

Source: International Monetary Fund (IMF)

=== GDP per capita (PPP) ===
Historical evolution of GDP per capita (PPP) of Rwanda during the period 1980-2030

Source: International Monetary Fund (IMF)

The following table shows the main economic indicators in 1980–2026. Inflation below 5% is in green.

Year	GDP (in bn. US$ PPP)	GDP per capita (in US$ PPP)	GDP (in bn. US$ nominal)	GDP growth (real)	Inflation (in percent)	Government debt (percentage of GDP)
1980	2.12	416	1.47	▼−3.6%	▲7.2%	n/a
1985	▲3.42	▲567	▲2.17	▲4.4%	▲1.7%	n/a
1990	▲3.99	▼564	▲2.91	▲0.4%	▲4.2%	n/a
1995	▼2.98	▼497	▼1.45	▲24.5%	▲56.0%	102%
2000	▲5.03	▲654	▲2.02	▲8.4%	▲3.9%	▼87%
2005	▲8.33	▲946	▲2.90	▲9.4%	▲9.1%	▼60%
2006	▲9.37	▲1,041	▲3.27	▲9.2%	▲8.8%	▼23%
2007	▲10.36	▲1,126	▲4.02	▲7.7%	▲9.1%	▼22%
2008	▲11.74	▲1,236	▲5.12	▲11.2%	▲15.4%	▼19%
2009	▲12.55	▲1,294	▲5.61	▲6.2%	▲10.3%	19%
2010	▲13.64	▲1,364	▲6.05	▲7.3%	▲2.3%	19%
2011	▲15.03	▲1,473	▲6.80	▲8.0%	▲5.7%	19%
2012	▲16.63	▲1,586	▲7.56	▲8.6%	▲6.3%	19%
2013	▲17.71	▲1,649	▲7.71	▲4.7%	▲4.2%	▲27%
2014	▲19.04	▲1,731	▲8.13	▲5.7%	▲1.8%	▲30%
2015	▲20.92	▲1,857	▲8.45	▲8.9%	▲2.5%	▲34%
2016	▲22.32	▲1,935	▲8.60	▲5.7%	▲5.7%	▲42%
2017	▲23.78	▲2,014	▲9.17	▲4.7%	▲4.8%	▲46%
2018	▲26.58	▲2,198	▲9.65	▲8.1%	▲1.4%	▲49%
2019	▲30.34	▲2,452	▲10.52	▲9.3%	▲2.4%	▲53%
2020	▲30.77	▼2,430	▼10.49	▼−2.8%	▲7.7%	▲67%
2021	▲37.08	▲2,862	▲11.25	▲8.4%	▲0.8%	▼66%
2022	▲43.61	▲3,293	▲13.74	▲9.8%	▲13.9%	▼59%
2023	▲49.10	▲3,637	▲14.81	▲8.6%	▲14.0%	▲61%
2024	▲53.94	▲3,893	▲15.11	▲7.2%	▲4.8%	▲63%
2025	▲59.35	▲4,190	▲15.97	▲7.0%	▲7.0%	▲65%
2026	▲65.46	▲4,524	▲17.34	▲7.2%	▲5.6%	▲67%

== See also ==
- Rwanda
- Energy in Rwanda
- Telecommunications in Rwanda
- Transport in Rwanda
- United Nations Economic Commission for Africa

General:

- Economy of Africa
