= Brasseries de Bourbon =

Réunion based brewery

- Location: Saint-Denis; Réunion Island
- Opened: 1962
- Owned by: Heineken

Active beers
Name	Type
Héritage de Bourbon	lager
Dodo	lager

The Brasseries de Bourbon ("Breweries of Bourbon") is the only major producer of beer on Réunion Island, formerly known as Bourbon Island, a French overseas department in the Indian Ocean.

== History ==
The Brasseries de Bourbon was born out of three companies founded by Vernon King Stevenson: The SOREG (Société Réunionnaise des Eaux gazeuses), first manufacturer of Coca-Cola on the Réunion Island founded in 1958; Brasseries de Bourbon founded in 1962; Bourbon Distribution Service founded in 1983. In 1986 Heineken became the majority shareholder of the three companies. In 1994, the three companies merged to form the Groupe Brasseries de Bourbon.

In 2011, the company launched an advertising campaign to fight the competition of imported Coca-Cola from African and Asian manufacturers which cannibalized the Brasseries' Coca-Cola sales.

In 2014, the Brasseries de Bourbon launched the premium beer brand Héritage de Bourbon. In 2017, the Brasseries de Bourbon launched its first line of non-alcoholic beers. That same year, the company broke the Guinness World Records of the longest picnic table (322.42 metres) in a move to promote its Dodo beer.

== Description ==
A large la dodo lé la painting on a snack wall

The first product of the Brasseries de Bourbon, and by far now their most sold and widely known, is the blonde lager Bourbon, known popularly as Dodo, named after the now extinct bird of Mauritius. Its logo of a smiling dodo and the creole slogan la dodo lé la (the dodo is here) are found painted on the walls of establishments selling the beer. Since 1996, the group has also produced some white and reddish beers. In addition, it also imports and bottles a variety of other drinks.

Brasseries de Bourbon is also the manufacturer and distributor of Coca-Cola and Orangina in the Réunion Island.
