= I&M Holdings Limited =

Kenyan financial services conglomerate

Coordinates: 01°17′38″S 36°48′40″E

- Type: Public
- Traded as: KN: IMH
- Industry: Banking, insurance
- Founded: 15 August 1950; 76 years ago
- Headquarters: 1 Park Avenue; Nairobi, Kenya
- Key people: Daniel Ndonye (independent chairman); Sarit Raja-Shah (group executive director)
- Revenue: ▲Aftertax:KES:8.13 billion (US$70.8 million) (2021)
- Total assets: KES:415.2 billion (US$3.613 billion) (2021)
- Website: www.imbankgroup.com

I&M Holdings Limited, also I&M Bank Group, is a conglomerate comprising banks, an insurance company and investment advisory businesses. The group's headquarters are located in Nairobi, Kenya, with subsidiaries in Kenya, Mauritius, Rwanda, Tanzania and Uganda. The flagship company of the group is I&M Bank Limited, with headquarters in the I&M Bank Tower on Kenyatta Avenue in the central business district of Nairobi, Kenya's capital and largest city.

== Overview ==
I&M Group Plc a large financial services conglomerate, serving the countries of the East African Community and parts of the Indian Ocean Islands. As of December 2021, the company's total assets were KES:415.2 billion (US$3.61 billion), with shareholders' equity of KES:69.6 billion (US$605.8 million). At that time, company maintained subsidiaries in five countries in the African Great Lakes region.

== History ==
I&M Holdings is a result of a reverse merger between The City Trust Limited and I&M Bank Limited.

=== City Trust ===
I&M Holdings Limited was founded in 1950 as City Trust Limited, an investment holding company. The firm was one of the first to list its stock on the Nairobi Securities Exchange.

=== I&M Bank ===
I&M Bank was founded in 1974 as Investments & Mortgages Limited, a private company providing personalised financial services to business people in the Nairobi area. The firm converted to a commercial bank in 1996. In 2003, the bank acquired Biashara Bank of Kenya Limited thereby expanding its branch network, client base and assets under management.

In 2010, the group acquired a controlling interest in CF Union Bank of Tanzania, whose assets were estimated at about US$61 million in December 2009. In September 2010, CF Union Bank Tanzania rebranded to I&M Bank (Tanzania). The group was reported to have intentions to expand throughout East Africa through acquisitions.

During 2012, the group acquired a controlling interest in Commercial Bank of Rwanda (BCR), the second-largest commercial bank in the Republic of Rwanda. In 2013 BCR rebranded to I&M Bank (Rwanda), to reflect its current shareholding.

=== Merger ===
In 2013, the boards of City Trust and I&M Bank announced a reverse takeover of the latter. A decision that was accepted by shareholders of both companies and completed in June 2013. City Trust's name was changed to I&M Holdings and the I&M Bank's subsidiaries were unbundled from the bank to I&M Holdings.

=== Post-merger ===
On 7 September 2015 I&M Holdings announced the acquisition of Giro Commercial Bank and merging of its business with that of I&M Bank Kenya. The process, which required regulatory approval, was concluded in February 2017, with Giro Commercial Bank surrendering its banking license and becoming part of I&M Bank Limited.

On 20 July 2020, I&M Holdings Limited signed an agreement with the shareholders of Orient Bank (OBU) in Uganda, committing I&MHL to buy and the owners of OBU to sell 90 percent shareholding in the Ugandan commercial bank. The transaction, which requires regulatory approval in Uganda and Kenya will cost in excess of KES:2 billion (US$20 million).

== Member companies ==
The companies that comprise the I&M Bank Group include, but are not limited to, the following:

1. I&M Bank Limited – Nairobi, Kenya: The flagship company of the group. A commercial bank in Kenya, serving individuals and businesses, focusing mainly on medium sized corporations.
2. Bank One Mauritius – Port Louis, Mauritius: The group owns 50% of Bank One Mauritius. The other 50% is owned by CIEL Investments Limited. As of December 2013, total bank assets were approximately US$581.85 million.
3. I&M Bank Tanzania Limited – Dar-es-Salaam, Tanzania: I&M Bank Group owns 55.03 percent shareholding since 2010. Other investors in I&M Bank Tanzania Limited include: PROPARCO of France, Kibo Fund, a private equity fund based in Mauritius and Michael Shirima, a Tanzanian businessman.
4. I&M Bank Rwanda Limited – Kigali, Rwanda: In July 2012, I&M Bank Group acquired 54.99 percent shareholding in Commercial Bank of Rwanda (BCR), the second-largest commercial bank in the country at the time, for an undisclosed sum of money. BCR re-branded to I&M Bank Rwanda in August 2013. Total Bank Assets as of December 2013 estimated at approximately US$185.27 million.
5. I&M Capital – Nairobi, Kenya: A fund management company licensed by the Capital Markets Authority.
6. GA Insurance – Nairobi, Kenya: Incorporated as General Accident Insurance of Kenya in 1979, the company was acquired by the I&M Bank Group in 2005. Since its acquisition, the company has re-branded as GA Insurance Limited. The company provides various types of insurance cover, including health care coverage.
7. Burbidge Capital Limited - An investment advisory company with offices in Kenya, Uganda and the United Kingdom.
8. I&M Bank Uganda Limited - Kampala, Uganda: A commercial bank in Uganda, with total banking assets of approximately US$222 million (USh814.3 billion), and shareholders equity of about US$31 million (USh114.1 billion), as of 31 December 2019. Acquisition started in July 2020. Regulatory approval is ongoing and once given, institution is expected to acquire the I&M brand.

== Ownership ==
The shares of I&M Holdings Limited are listed on the Nairobi Securities Exchange (NSE), where they trade under the symbol IMHL. As of December 2019 the shareholding of I&M Holdings Limited was as follows:

I&M Bank Group stock ownership
Rank	Name of owner	Percentage ownership
1	Minard Holdings Limited of Kenya	21.37
2	Tecoma Limited of Kenya	18.39
3	Ziyungi Limited of Kenya	17.79
4	CDC Group of the United Kingdom	10.13
5	Bhagwanji Raja Charitable Foundation Registered Trustees	2.56
6	Investments & Mortgages Nominees Ltd A/C 0001229	2.05
7	Investments & Mortgages Nominees Ltd A/C 0004047	2.03
8	Investments & Mortgages Nominees Ltd A/C 002983	1.33
9	Blanford Investments Limited	1.11
10	Lombard Holdings Limited	0.89
11	Other shareholders individually not holding more than 5% each	22.35
	Total	100.00

== Governance ==
I&M Holdings Limited is governed by a nine-person board of directors. Daniel Ndonye serves as an independent chairman, since 14 June 2013. Sarit Raja-Shah serves as the group executive director, effective 14 June 2013.

== See also ==
- I&M Bank Tower
- List of insurance companies in Kenya
- List of conglomerates in Africa
