= NCBA Bank Rwanda =

Commercial bank in Rwanda

Coordinates: 01°57′11″S 30°05′35″E

- Company type: Subsidiary
- Industry: Banking
- Founded: 1 December 2016; 9 years ago
- Headquarters: Kigali Heights, 8th Floor, No. 772, KG7 Avenue, Boulevard de L’Umuganda, Kigali, Rwanda
- Key people: Benjamin M Rugangazi; Chairman; Lina Higiro; Managing Director
- Products: Loans, Savings, Transaction accounts, Investments, Debit Cards, Credit Cards, Mortgages
- Revenue: ▼Aftertax:RWF:1.363 billion (US$1.463 million) (Q3:2019)
- Total assets: RWF:117 billion (US$107 million) (Q3:2022)
- Number of employees: 98 (2022)
- Parent: NCBA Group Plc
- Website: rw.ncbagroup.com

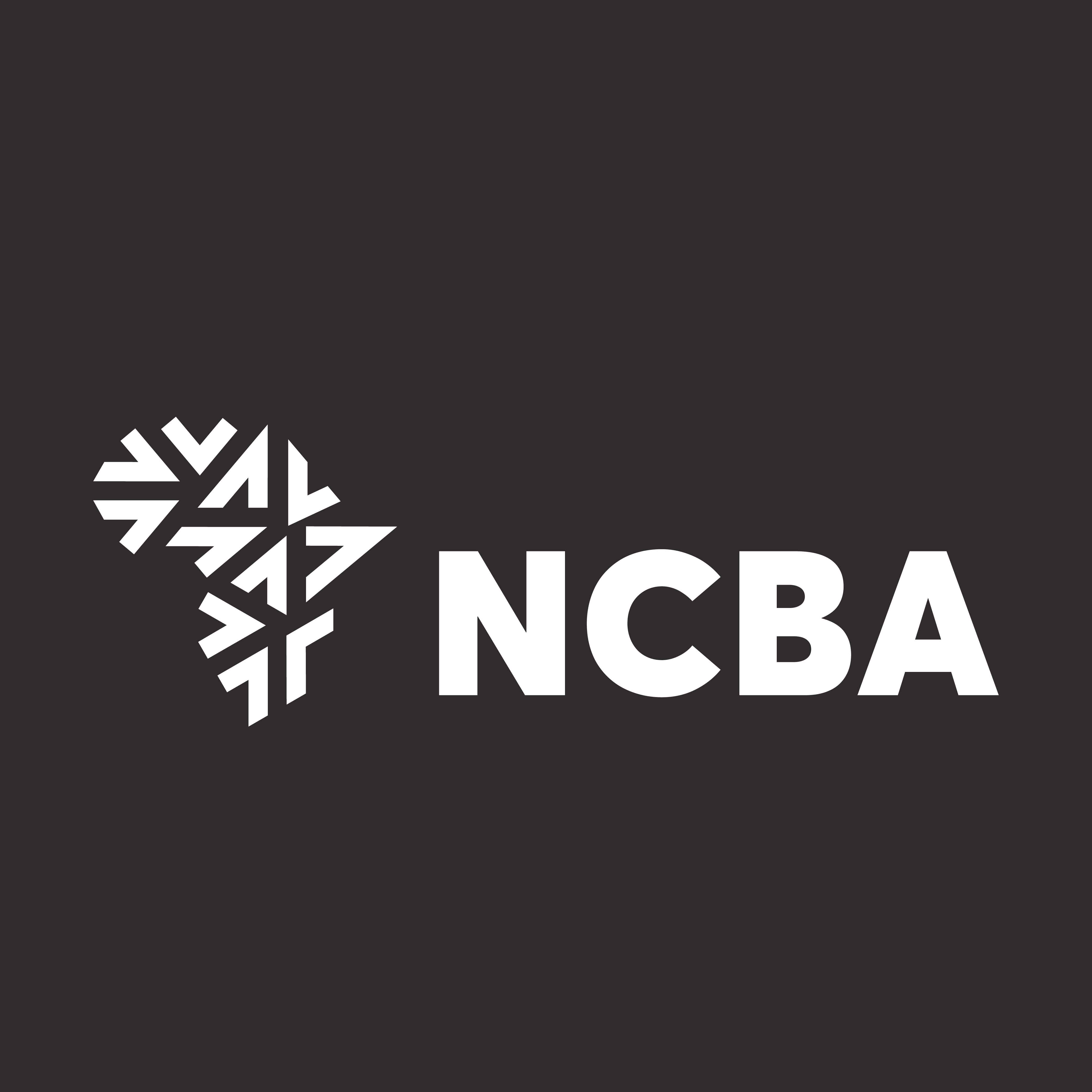
Logo of NCBA

NCBA Bank Rwanda, formerly Commercial Bank of Africa (Rwanda), is a commercial bank in Rwanda. NCBA Bank Rwanda is one of the Kenyan-owned bank subsidiaries to launch operations in Rwanda. The bank is a subsidiary of the NCBA Group Plc, a financial services group with headquarters in Nairobi, Kenya, with subsidiaries in Kenya, Rwanda, Tanzania, Uganda and Ivory Coast.

== Overview ==
As of 30 September 2019, the bank's total assets were valued at RWF:30.23 billion (US$32.44 million), with shareholders' equity of RWF:7.015 billion (US$7.53 million).

== History ==
In November 2015, the CBA Group, Kenya's largest privately owned financial services provider publicly announced their intention to enter the Rwandan market. The group applied for a banking licence from the Rwanda authorities.

In December 2016, the National Bank of Rwanda issued CBA Rwanda with a micro-finance banking licence. In May 2017, CBA Rwanda, a microfinance institution, made public its intention to acquire Crane Bank Rwanda, a commercial bank, whose parent company in Uganda had been sold and the buyers of the parent did not want to keep the Rwandan subsidiary. On 15 June 2017 CBA Group signed a definitive sale and purchase agreement with DFCU Bank, the owners of Crane Bank Rwanda. The acquisition required regulatory approval in Rwanda, Kenya and Uganda.

== Commercial bank status ==
On Monday, 21 February 2018, The EastAfrican reported that the requisite approvals for the purchase of Crane Bank Rwanda had been received from the Bank of Uganda, the Central Bank of Kenya and the National Bank of Rwanda. The acquired assets and liabilities, including two operational branches in Kigali, are expected to be merged with the existing micro-finance operations of CBA Rwanda. On 19 March 2018, the refurbished branches of Crane Bank Rwanda, opened as CBA Bank Rwanda, a commercial bank.

== Group merger ==
In September 2019, Commercial Bank of Africa Group, the parent company of the Commercial Bank of Africa (Rwanda), received regulatory approval from the Central Bank of Kenya and from the Kenya Ministry of Finance, to merge with the NIC Bank Group, effective 1 October 2019. It is expected that this bank will re-brand to NCBA Bank Rwanda, subject to the approval of the National Bank of Rwanda. On 13 January 2020, NCBA Bank Rwanda received a new commercial banking license from the National Bank of Rwanda.

== Branches ==
1. Nyarugenge Branch: 10249 Ville De Kigali, Nyarugenge, Kigali
2. La Bonne Adresse Branch: 5447 La Bonne Adresse Building, 76 Avenue de la Revolution, Kigali
3. Kigali Heights Branch: Kigali Heights Shopping Complex, Kigali. (Main Branch)
4. Kayonza Branch
5. Nyabugogo Branch
6. Musanze Branch

== See also ==
- List of banks in Rwanda
- National Bank of Rwanda
