= Bank of Kigali =

Commercial bank in Rwanda

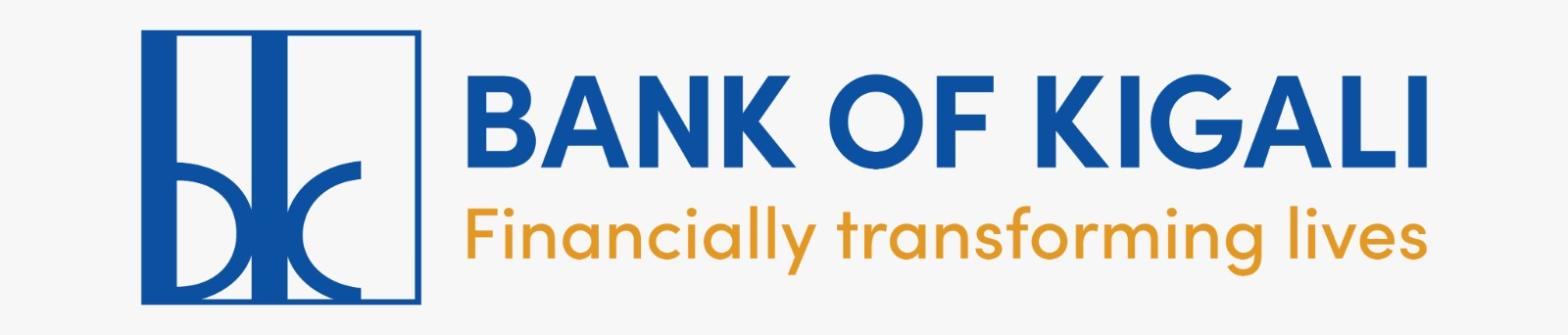

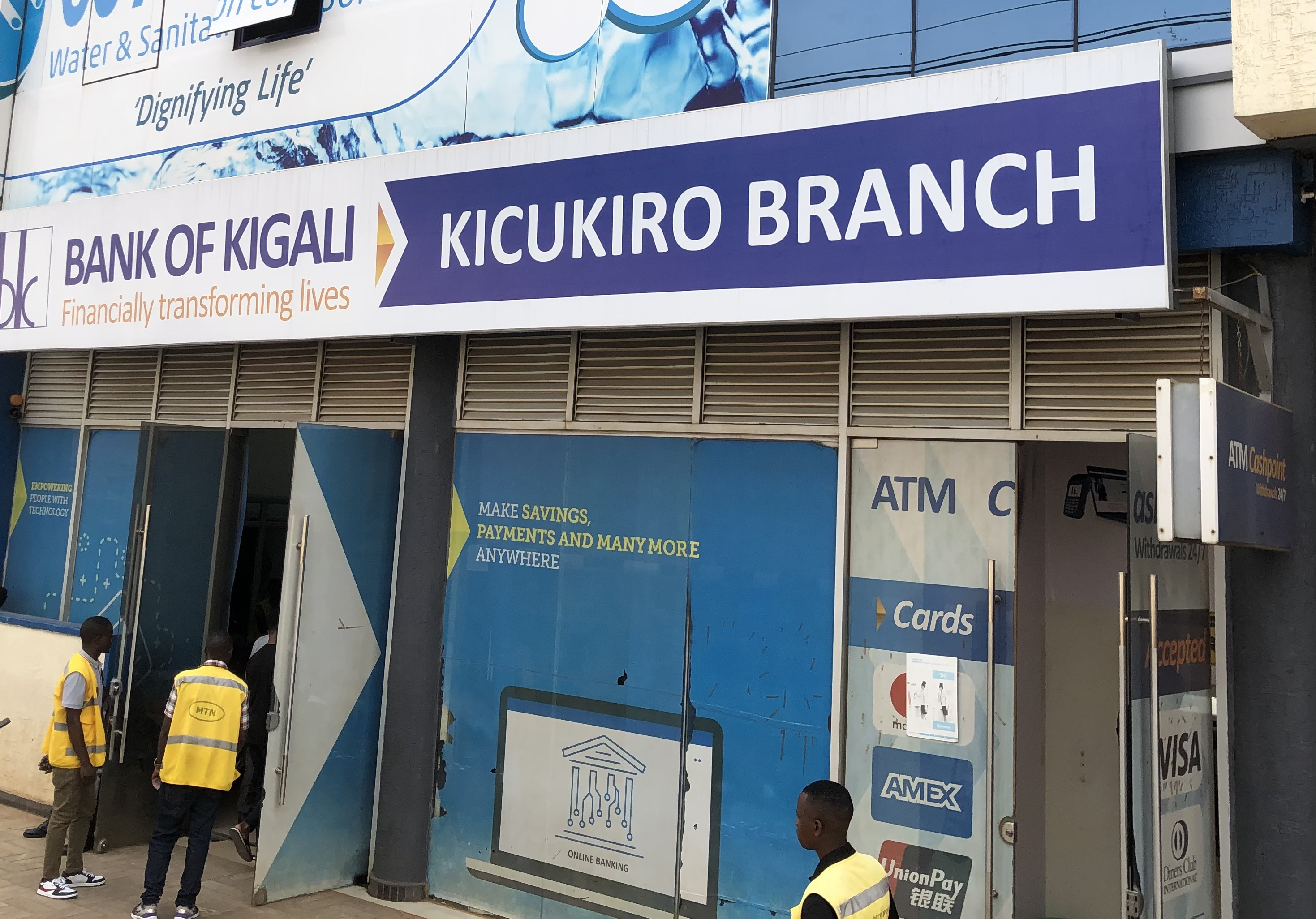
- Type: Public
- Traded as: RSE: BOK
- Industry: Banking
- Founded: December 22, 1966; 59 years ago
- Headquarters: Kigali, Rwanda
- Key people: Eugene Ubalijoro (chairman); Diane Karusisi (chief executive officer)
- Products: Loans, checking, savings, investments, mortgages, internet banking, insurance services
- Revenue: ▲Aftertax: $40.5 million) (2019)
- Total assets: US$1,105,900,000 (2019)
- Number of employees: 1,200+ (2017)
- Website: www.bk.rw

Bank of Kigali Plc (BK) is a commercial bank in Rwanda. It is licensed by the National Bank of Rwanda.

== Location ==
The headquarters and main branch of the bank are located at 6112 KN4 Avenue, in Nyarugenge District, in the city of Kigali, the capital and largest city in Rwanda. The geographical coordinates of the bank's headquarters are: 01°56'54.0"S, 30°03'35.0"E (Latitude:-1.948333; Longitude:30.059722).

== Overview ==
Bank of Kigali is the largest commercial bank in Rwanda, by total assets. As of 31 December 2019, the bank's total assets were valued at US$1,1059 million, with a loan book of $735.8 million, customer deposits of $697.4 million and shareholders equity of US$239.6 million.

On 29 September 2017, Global Credit Ratings affirmed Bank of Kigali Limited's long-term and short-term national scale ratings of AA-(RW) and A1+(RW) respectively; with a stable outlook.

The bank has won several back to back international and regional "Best Bank in Rwanda" awards, including from EuroMoney, The Banker, Global Finance Magazine, and EMEA Finance.

== History ==
The bank was incorporated in the Republic of Rwanda on 22 December 1966. Initially Bank of Kigali was founded as a joint venture between the Government of Rwanda and Banque Belgolaise, with each owning 50 percent of the ordinary share capital. In 1967, the bank commenced its operations with its first branch in Kigali.

By then, Belgolaise was a subsidiary of Fortis Group, operating in Sub-Saharan Africa but in 2005 began to withdraw from its operations in Africa in line with Fortis' strategy. In 2007 the Government of Rwanda acquired the Belgolaise shareholding in Bank of Kigali, thereby increasing its direct and indirect shareholding in the bank to 100% of the entire Issued Shares. In 2011, the bank changed its name under the new law relating to companies from Bank of Kigali S.A to Bank of Kigali Limited.

On 21 June 2011, the Rwandan Capital Market Advisory Council approved plans for the bank to float 45 percent of its shares and list its shares on the Rwanda Stock Exchange (RSE), becoming the second domestic company to list on the RSE in a US$62.5 million initial public offering. Trading in the shares of the bank started on 30 June 2011.

In December 2012, regional media reports indicated that the bank was in the middle of an expansion into neighboring Uganda. In February 2013, the bank received regulatory approval to open an office in Kenya. While regional expansion was a top priority under former CEO James Gatera, his successor, Diane Karusisi, has hinted that her focus is on further deepening the bank's roots at home to tap into what still remains a largely formally un-banked population. According to FinScope's survey on access to finance in Rwanda, out of 4 million adult Rwandans who have access to formal financial services, only 1.5 million adults or 26 percent of the total, use banks, with only slightly over 60,600 adults of the 1.5 million exclusively relying on banks; others have alternatives outside banking.

In May 2018, at the bank's Annual General Meeting, the shareholders' approved plans to cross-list the stock of the bank on the Nairobi Stock Exchange (NSE), the largest in the East African Community. The cross-listing and the planned rights issue, both planned during the second half of 2018, are expected to raise US$70 million, to be deployed on the acquisition of new, improved ICT systems ($20 million), with the rest deployed in loans to support infrastructure projects at home. In October 2018, the EastAfrican, a regional English language newspaper reported that the stock of Bank of Kigali was expected to list on the Nairobi stock exchange on 30 November 2018.

== Branch network ==
As of December 2018, the bank maintained 79 networked branches, nearly 100 automated teller machines, more than 1,427 banking agents, six mobile banking vans and employed over 1,200 staff.

== Governance ==
The bank is supervised by a board of directors led by chairman of the board, a position currently held by Eugene Ubalijoro. The day-to-day activities of the bank are administered by a ten-person executive management team headed by the chief executive officer, Dr. Diane Karusisi.

== Shareholding ==
The shares of Stock of the bank's holding company, Bank of Kigali Group Plc, are primarily listed on the Rwanda Stock Exchange and are cross-listed on the Nairobi Stock Exchange. As of December 2019, the ownership of the bank's stock stood as depicted in the table below:

Rank	Owner	Percentage ownership
1	Social Security Board of Rwanda	34.3%
2	International institutional investors	22.4%
3	Agaciro Development Fund	22.0%
4	Regional institutional investors	12.3%
5	Retail investors	7.2%
6	BK employees & directors	1.1%
7	Local institutional investors	0.6%
8	Other state owned entities	0.1%
	Total	100.00%

- Note:Totals may be slightly off due to rounding.

== See also ==
- List of banks in Rwanda
- Economy of Rwanda
