= Bank One Mauritius =

Banking company in Mauritius

Bank One Limited (Mauritius)
- Company type: Private
- Industry: Financial services
- Predecessor: First City Bank
- Founded: 2008
- Headquarters: Port Louis, Mauritius
- Key people: Sandra Martyres (Chairman), Mark Watkinson (Chief Executive Officer)
- Products: Banking
- Revenue: ▲MUR 1,317 Million (US$33.4 Million)(2020)
- Total assets: ▲MUR 57.01 Billion (US$1.45 Billion) (2020)
- Owner: CIEL Limited (50%) I&M Group Plc (50%)
- Number of employees: 421 (2020)
- Website: www.bankone.mu/en/

Bank One Mauritius is a full service commercial bank based in Mauritius and jointly owned by CIEL Finance Limited and I&M Group PLC.

The CIEL group owns 75% of CIEL Finance, and Amethis Finance Corporation, which manages investment funds for the African continent, owns the other 25%.

CIEL is one of the largest groups in Mauritius, with operations in 10 countries and 35,000 employees. The group is publicly listed in Mauritius.

I&M has interests in banking, insurance, manufacturing, and real estate and has operations in Kenya, Tanzania, Uganda, Rwanda and Mauritius. The group is listed on the Nairobi Stock Exchange and is one of the oldest publicly owned companies in Kenya.

Bank One has a team of 421 staff and has domestic retail and corporate banking operations and cross border businesses focused on Sub-Saharan Africa, serving the following segments: wealth management, custody, private banking, corporate and financial institutions.

The shareholders of Bank One have interests in banking operations in eight African markets (Kenya, Madagascar, Rwanda, Tanzania, Uganda, Ghana, Ivory Coast and Mauritius) and this provides the Bank with unrivalled access and understanding of business in Sub-Saharan Africa.

== Ownership ==
The stock of the bank is privately owned. The table below depicts the ownership in Bank One Mauritius:

Bank One Mauritius Stock Ownership
Rank	Name of Owner	Percentage Ownership
1	I&M Group Plc of Kenya	50.00
2	CIEL Investments Limited of Mauritius	50.00
	Total	100.00

== Branches ==
BOM maintains networked branches at the following locations:

1. Main Branch - 16 Sir William Newton Street, Port Louis
2. Curepipe Branch - Royal Road, Curepipe
3. Rose Hill Branch - Royal Road, Rose Hill
4. Rose Belle Branch - Royal Road, Rose Belle
5. Vacoas Branch - John Kennedy Avenue, Vacoas
6. Quatre Bornes Branch - St Jean Road, A8, Quatre Bornes, Quatre Bornes
7. Flacq Branch - Charles de Gaulle Street, Flacq

== See also ==
- List of banks in Mauritius
- List of banks in Africa
- Bank of Mauritius
- Economy of Mauritius
- I&M Bank Group
