= Ecobank Rwanda =

Bank of Rwanda

- Type: Private
- Industry: Finance
- Founded: July 6, 2007; 19 years ago
- Headquarters: Kigali, Rwanda
- Key people: Vianney Shumbusho; Chairman; Alice Kalonzo-Zulu; CEO
- Products: Checking, Savings, Credit cards, Debit cards, Loans, Mortgages, Overdrafts etc.
- Revenue: ▼ Net RWF:3.2 billion (US$3.8 million) (2016)
- Total assets: RWF:193.527 billion (US$227.5 million) (2016)
- Owner: Ecobank International
- Website: www.ecobank.com/rw/

Ecobank Rwanda, whose full name is Ecobank Rwanda Limited, formerly Bank of Commerce, Development and Industry (BCDI), is a commercial bank in Rwanda, licensed and supervised by the National Bank of Rwanda, the central bank and national banking regulator.

== Location ==
The headquarters of Ecobank Rwanda and the main branch of the bank are located along KN3 Avenue in the central business district of the city of Kigali, the capital and largest urban centre of Rwanda. The geographical coordinates of the banks headquarters are 01°56'49.0"S, 30°03'38.0"E (Latitude:-1.946944; Longitude:30.060556).

== Overview ==
As of December 2016, the bank was a medium-sized financial institution with an asset base of RWF:193.527 billion (US$227.5 million), with shareholders' equity of RWF:17.835 billion (US$21 million), and RWF:161.625 billion (US$190 million) in customer deposits.

== History ==
Ecobank Rwanda was established on 6 July 2007, when Ecobank International acquired the Bank of Commerce, Development and Industry (BCDI), a commercial bank in Rwanda that had failed. At the time of acquisition, BCDI had a 46 percent non-performing loan profile, was under-capitalized and suffered from poor governance and inadequate operational controls. The new owners had to invest US$11.6 in new capital, to meet capitalization requirements.

== Shareholders ==
The bank is a 100 percent subsidiary of Ecobank Transnational Incorporated (ETI), the pan-African financial conglomerate headquartered in Lomé, Togo, with operations in 36 countries, according to the Ecobank Group website.

== Board of Governors ==
As of December 2016, the following were the members of the Board of Directors of Ecobank Rwanda:

1. Vianney Shumbusho: Chairman
2. Ephraim Turahirwa: Member
3. Ivan Twagirashema: Member
4. Ibironke Wilson: Member
5. Rose Gakuba: Member
6. Alice Kilonzo-Zulu: Managing Director.

== Management team ==
As recently as December 2017, the Managing Director and Chief Executive Officer of Ecobank Rwanda was Alice Kalonzo Zulu.

== Branches ==
As of December 2016, Ecobank Rwanda maintained 16 networked branches across the country. In December 2017 going forward, the bank began closing some upcountry branches and transferring the services and some employees to agency banking, in combination with digital banking. Once the selected branches are closed, the bank will remain with eight brick-and-mortar branches only.

== See also ==
- List of banks in Rwanda
- Economy of Rwanda
