= I&M Bank Rwanda =

Rwandan bank

I&M Bank (Rwanda) Plc.
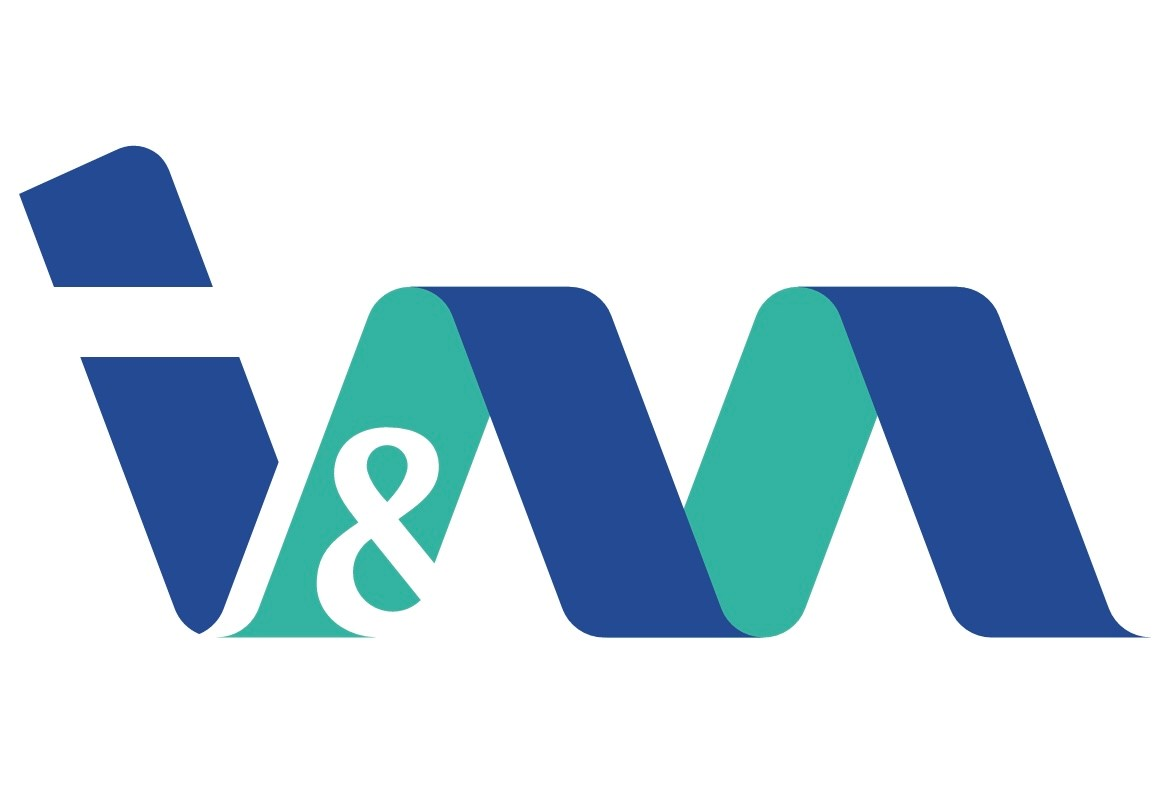
- Formerly: BCR
- Type: Public
- Traded as: RSE: IMR
- Industry: Financial services
- Founded: 1963; 63 years ago
- Headquarters: Kigali, Rwanda
- Key people: Bonaventure Niyibizi; Chairman; Benjamin Mutimura; Managing Director
- Products: Loans, Checking, savings, investments, debit cards
- Brands: I&M Group
- Revenue: ▲ After-tax US$13.159 million (RWF:18.6 billion) (December 2024)
- Total assets: US$578.64 million (RWF:817.9 billion) (December 2024)
- Number of employees: 467 (2023)
- Website: www.imbankgroup.com/rw

I&M Bank Rwanda Plc., is a commercial bank in Rwanda that is licensed by the National Bank of Rwanda, the county's central bank and national banking regulator. It is the second largest bank in Rwanda.

== Location ==
The headquarters of the bank are located at KN 03 Avenue 9, in the central business district of Kigali, Rwanda's capital and largest city. The geographical location of the bank's headquarters are:01°56'55.0"S, 30°03'41.0"E (Latitude:-1.948611; Longitude:30.061389).

== Overview ==
The Bank is the second-largest sized commercial bank in Rwanda, behind Bank of Kigali, serving large corporations, small-to-medium businesses, and individuals. As of December 2024, the bank's total assets were valued at RWF 817.9 billion (approx. US$578.64 million), with shareholders' equity of RWF 72 billion (approx. US$50.94 million).

== History ==
The bank was opened in 1963 under the name (French "Banque Commerciale du Rwanda" (BCR)) or "Commercial Bank of Rwanda". In the beginning, it was wholly owned by the Government of Rwanda. In 2004, it was privatized. As of April 2010, Actis Capital owned 80 percent and the Rwandan government owned the remaining 20 percent of the financial institution. Actis Capital is a private equity investment firm, headquartered in London, United Kingdom, that specializes in investments in developing countries. The firm's investment portfolio was almost US$5 billion as of April 2010.

In July 2012, Actis Capital divested from BCR by selling its shares to a consortium comprising the I&M Bank Group from Kenya, PROPARCO from France, and the German Investment Corporation. The Rwandan government retained its shares in the bank. In August 2013, the bank rebranded to I&M Bank (Rwanda) to reflect its current shareholding.

In September 2015, I&M Bank Rwanda appointed its current Managing Director - Robin Bairstow.

In March 2017, I&M Bank Rwanda started trading on the Rwanda Stock Exchange through an Initial Public Offering.

== I&M Bank Group ==
I&M Bank (Rwanda) is a member of the I&M Bank Group of companies. The group is a leading financial services provider in East Africa, with an asset base in excess of US$3.14 billion (KSh324.3 billion) as of September 2019. The group has operations in Kenya, Mauritius, Rwanda, and Tanzania.

== Ownership ==
As of July 2021, the bank's stock was owned by the entities listed in the table below.

I&M Bank (Rwanda) Stock Ownership
Rank	Name of Owner	Percentage Ownership
1	I&M Bank Group	54.47
2	AfricInvest Evergreen Investments	24.76
4	Public	20.01
4	ESOP	0.61
5	Others	0.15
	Total	100.00

== Branch network ==
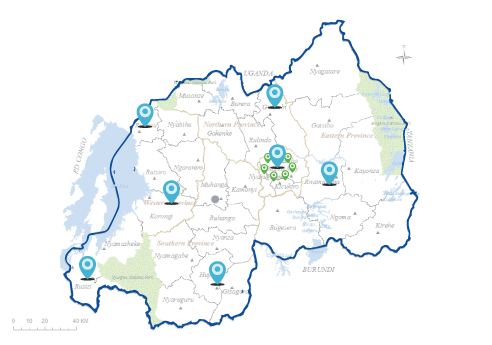
I&M Bank Rwanda Branches

I&M Bank Rwanda maintains the following branches, as of March 2020:

1. Head Office - KN 03 Avenue 9, Nyarugenge, Kigali
2. Kigali Heights - Kigali Heights Building, Gasabo, Kigali
3. Remera Branch - Umuyenzi Plaza, Gasabo District, Kisimenti, Remera, Kigali
4. Nyamirambo Branch - Merez 2 Petrol Station, Nyamirambo, Rwezamenyo Sector, Nyarugenge District, Kigali
5. Nyabugogo Branch - Inkundamahoro Building, Nyabugogo Sector, Nyarugenge District, Kigali
6. Kigali City Market Branch - Kigali City Market Building, Nyarugenge, Kigali
7. Chic Branch - CHIC Building, Downtown Nyarugenge, Kigali
8. Musanze Branch - Muhoza Sector, Musanze, Northern Province, Rwanda
9. Gicumbi Branch - Byumba Sector, Byumba, Gicumbi District, Northern Province, Rwanda
10. Rubavu Branch - Gisenyi Sector, Rubavu District, Western Province, Rwanda
11. Rusizi Branch - Kamembe Sector, Rusizi District, Western Province, Rwanda
12. Karongi Branch - RSSB Building, Karongi, Western Province
13. Huye Branch - Ngoma Sector, Huye, Southern Province
14. Rwamagana Branch - Kigabiro Sector, Rwamagana, Eastern Province, Rwanda.

== See also ==
- List of banks in Rwanda
- Economy of Rwanda
