= List of banks in Rwanda =

This is a list of banks in Rwanda, as updated by Q2 2026 by the National Bank of Rwanda.

== List of commercial banks ==
- I&M Bank Rwanda, part of I&M Holdings Limited
- Bank of Kigali Plc
- BPR Bank Rwanda Plc, part of KCB Group
- Guaranty Trust Bank Plc, part of GTCO Group
- Ecobank Rwanda Plc, part of Ecobank Group
- Access Bank Rwanda Plc, part of Access Bank Group
- Equity Bank Rwanda Plc, part of Equity Group
- Bank of Africa Rwanda, part of Bank of Africa Group
- NCBA Rwanda Plc, part of NCBA Group

== Other banks ==
- Rwanda Development Bank (RDB)
- Zigama Credit and Savings Bank, a cooperative bank

== See also ==
- AB Bank Rwanda
- Unguka Bank
- List of banks in Africa
- National Bank of Rwanda
- Economy of Rwanda
