= Naushad Merali =

Kenyan businessperson (1951–2021)

Naushad N. Merali
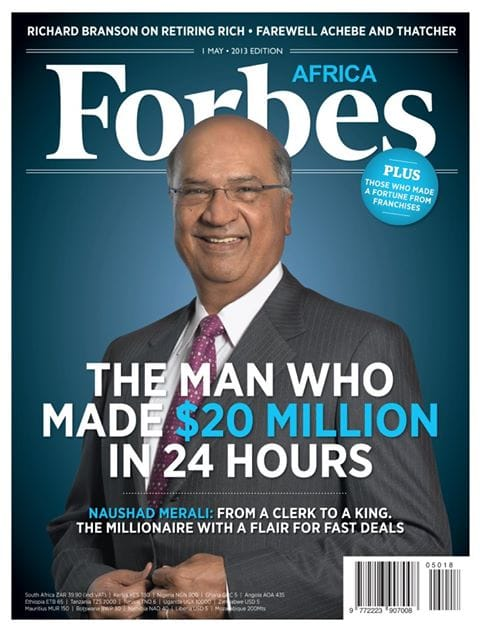
- Merali in the May 2013 Forbes Africa Edition
- Born: 2 January 1951; Nairobi, Kenya
- Died: 3 July 2021 (aged 70); Nairobi, Kenya
- Occupations: Businessman Industrialist, Philanthropist
- Known for: An African corporate boardroom folktale about a boardroom manoeuvre that earned him a $20million profit in one hour for his shareholding in a Kenyan private telecommunication company in 2004.
- Spouse: Zarin (wife)

Naushad N. Merali, CBS (2 January 1951 – 3 July 2021) was the founder of the Kenyan mobile service provider Kencell along with French media giant Vivendi. Merali became famous in an almost folk tale for a corporate boardroom manoeuvre that earned him a $20million dollar profit in one hour thanks to pre-emptive rights of his stake in private Telecom company Kencell Kenya in 2004. He attended Highway Secondary School in the suburbs of Nairobi, Kenya. As one of Kenya's leading industrialists, Merali brought commercial development in Kenya for more than 30 years and was constantly expanding his businesses throughout East Africa.

Based on the annual Forbes ranking of Africa's richest in Kenya Merali was the third richest man in Kenya and 48th richest man in Africa, with a net worth of $370 million, as of November 2015. He ranked behind Bhimji Depar Shah and family who, with a net worth of $700M, ranked 31st richest in Africa as of November 2015 and Narendra Raval of Devki Group, who ranked second richest in Kenya with a net worth of $400 million.

== Early life and education ==
Merali was born in January 1951 in Mombasa. Merali's grandfather emigrated from India in 1883 settling along Kenya's coast. His family later moved to Moshi Tanzania where Merali attended primary school with his three brothers and three sisters. Upon introduction of Socialist principles in Tanzania that were then unfavourable, Merali later moved to Nairobi in 1969 and completed high school at Highway Secondary School. Merali then attended a college of accounts and finance at a college on Oxford street in London.

He began his career in the 1970s as a finance clerk at Ryce Motors in Nairobi. At age 24 in 1975, he purchased the company from its retiring owner with a $2,350 loan from the Bank of America (now the Commercial Bank of Africa Group).

As managing director, he expanded the premises, repaid the loan, and turned Ryce Motors into a profitable enterprise. Within 6 years of becoming managing director of Ryce, Merali invested in construction company H Young as his first buyout and by 1985 bought commercial bank, Commercial Bank of Africa Group by forming a consortium that included the Kenyatta family.

== Career ==
=== WPH Kenya Tea Company ===
From the 1980s to March 2005, Merali was the director of the now-defunct W.P.H. Kenya Tea company.

=== Bharti Airtel Kenya ===
In 2004, he managed to purchase 60% ownership of the business from Vivendi for $230 million. Merali would transfer ownership only an hour later to Celtel for a $20 million profit, while owning 5% of Bharti Airtel's Kenyan wireless phone operations.

=== Sameer Group ===
Merali spent his time steering the affairs of the Sameer Group. The Sameer Group is a conglomerate of 15 Kenyan companies that range from financial services to agriculture and even information technology. Three of these companies appear on the Nairobi Stock Exchange and Merali was worth $210 million as of 2 November 2011.

=== Other investments ===
He was reported to have shares in the Commercial Bank of Africa as of 2003. Merali's purchase of the Grand Regency Hotel during that year was later tethered to a controversy surrounding the hotel and its ties to proceeds of corruption.

Merali also held positions at the Kenya Export Promotion Council, the International Who's Who of Professionals, and the National Investment Council of Kenya. The President of Kenya has appointed him to positions such as membership in the Kenya Export Promotion Council, membership in The National Poverty Eradication Commission of Kenya, and membership in The Presidential Committee on Employment. He appeared at the 2011 World Economic Forum in Davos as one of the African delegates – making him one of the three Kenyan delegates. As of September 2011, Kenya Data Networks – one of his business ventures – was facing financial problems and the shareholders were ready to cause a shakedown in the entire management team. These financial problems came to fruition by 2013 when Merali relinquished control of the company.

In 2012, Merali invested in construction. Two of Merali's former firms, Kenya Data Networks and Swift Global were in the process of being merged into Great Britain's Liquid Telecoms as of February 2013. Many executive positions were declared redundant as a result of this multinational merger. Both retail and wholesale services for the lower end of the consumer spectrum were provided by both of these firms as individual companies; as rival Internet service provider Safaricom already had a firm grasp on the upper end of the market.

In June 2015, Forbes reported that Merali sold, a Ugandan milk processing subsidiary company of Sameer Group to Kenya's largest milk processor, Brookside Dairies.

In October 2016 Merali was set to open a $30 million milk processing factory in Nakuru to rival Kenya's largest milk processor Brookside Dairy Limited estimated to employ by 500 people by June 2017. In September 2016, another company controlled by Merali which was then Kenya's sole tyre manufacturer announced it would cut more than 600 jobs following closure of its factories in favour of imports from China. In December 2016 Merali invested $4 million in a macadamia plant in Kiambu through another of Sameer group's listed subsidiaries that is one of the largest producers of coffee in Kenya.

=== Equatorial Commercial Bank and Mwalimu Sacco ===
Merali was the principal shareholder of Equatorial Commercial Bank (ECB), which he had founded in 1983 as a finance house before it became a commercial bank. In 2014, Mwalimu National Savings and Credit Co-operative Society (Mwalimu Sacco) agreed to acquire a majority stake in ECB from Merali in a transaction initially valued at about KSh2.5 billion. The proposed acquisition attracted regulatory scrutiny over the bank's valuation, profitability, corporate governance and the due-diligence process undertaken by Mwalimu Sacco. Regulators temporarily halted the transaction pending further review, while concerns were also raised over potential conflicts of interest involving Mwalimu executives with previous connections to ECB.

The transaction was subsequently approved, with Mwalimu acquiring 75% of ECB, while Merali retained a minority interest. The bank was renamed Spire Bank in 2016. Merali remained involved as a significant shareholder through his investment interests until Mwalimu eventually acquired the remaining stake.

The acquisition later became controversial after Spire Bank experienced persistent losses and capital and liquidity problems. In 2016, Merali withdrew approximately KSh1.7 billion in deposits from the bank, an amount equivalent at the time to roughly one-fifth of its deposits. Mwalimu officials subsequently argued that the withdrawal contributed to liquidity pressures and triggered further withdrawals by other customers. Parliamentary scrutiny later examined the transaction and the bank's subsequent deterioration, with reports estimating accumulated losses of about KSh10 billion by 2023.

In January 2023, Equity Bank Kenya Limited acquired certain assets and liabilities of Spire Bank in a transaction approved by the Central Bank of Kenya and the National Treasury. The transaction transferred approximately 20,000 deposit customers and 3,700 loan customers to Equity Bank, rather than constituting a conventional acquisition of Spire Bank as a going concern. The transaction was completed on 31 January 2023, effectively ending Mwalimu Sacco's involvement in the bank.

== Personal life ==
=== Family ===
Merali's ancestors were believed to have emigrated from the state of Gujarat in what is now known as India. His mother's maiden name is assumed to be Patel; a surname occupied by famous Indian businessmen and 33% of all American mid-sized hotel owners.

His wife was Zarin Merali, who is a director of the Kenyan Paraplegic Organisation. She is also an interior design consultant.

=== Wealth ===
Since the inaugural ranking of Forbes list of Africa's richest in 2011, Merali ranked among top 3 richest people in Kenya, and among 40 richest in Africa 5 times. In 2015 he ranked 3rd richest in Kenya and 48th in Africa with a net worth of $370 million. In 2014 he ranked 2nd richest in Kenya with a net worth of $550 million. In 2013 he ranked 2nd in Kenya with a net worth of $430 million. In 2012 he was second richest with a net worth of $410 million. In the inaugural ranking of Africa's richest he ranked 3rd richest in Kenya with a net worth of $210 million.

=== Death ===
He died at a city hospital in Nairobi, after having an undisclosed short illness on the morning of 3 July 2021.

== Philanthropy ==
Through the Zarina and Merali foundation, Merali gave $1.75 million to $2.92 million yearly to various communities and caucuses. His biggest donation was a $1.17 million donation to Kenyatta National Hospital to build a day care centre.

Merali also donated a prime beach property of 30 acres in affluent Malindi town, to the Kenyan government for the purpose of creating a public beach. In Nairobi he reserved a piece of land to establish a sports club jaffery's.

== Legacy and honors ==
During the tenure of Evans Kidero as governor of Nairobi, a road within the affluent estate Lavington, Nairobi was named Naushad Merali drive to honor Merali's contribution to business growth in Kenya during his lifetime.

During his lifetime, Merali received Kenyan state commendations of Elder of the Burning spear (EBS.) in 1986 and Chief Order of the Burning Spear (CBS.) in 2001 In December 2015,Kabarak University awarded Merali a Honorary Doctorate in Business leadership. He previously served on boards of Kenya Export Promotion Council,the International Who's Who of Professionals, National Investment Council of Kenya, The National Poverty Eradication Commission of Kenya and The Presidential Committee on Employment

Merali is regarded as a pioneer in establishment of private-sector export-processing infrastructure in Kenya through the development of Sameer Industrial Park, which was Kenya's earliest private EPZs and is described by the Export Processing Zones Authority as the first private EPZ to be gazetted in Kenya in November 1990.

== See also ==
- List of wealthiest people in Kenya
- Aga Khan Development Network
- Jayesh Saini
