= List of Kenyans by net worth =

List of richest people in Kenya by net worth according to forbes magazine

The following is a list of Kenya's richest. It is based on an annual assessment of wealth and assets compiled and published by Forbes magazine.

Kenya is the largest economy in the East African Community, the 3rd largest economy in Sub-Saharan Africa, with a gross domestic product of US$120.87 billion as of 2020 up from US$70.539 billion in 2017. Kenya ranks behind South Africa and Nigeria in GDP rankings of Sub-Saharan African countries.

== 2015 ==
Rank in Kenya	Name	Age	Citizenship	Net worth (USD)	Sources of wealth	Rank in Africa
1	Bhimji Depar Shah and family	84	Kenya	0.7Billion	Food Processing: (Bidco Africa)	31
2	Narendra Raval	58	Kenya	0.4 Billion	Steel & Cement: (Devki Group, NCCL)	46
3	Naushad Merali	64	Kenya	0.37 Billion	Diversified: (Sameer Group, Airtel Kenya)	48

== 2014 ==
Rank in Kenya	Name	Age	Citizenship	Net worth (USD)	Sources of wealth	Rank in Africa
1	Bhimji Depar Shah and family	83	Kenya	0.7 Billion	Food Processing: (Bidco Africa)	33
2	Naushad Merali	63	Kenya	0.55 Billion	Diversified: (Sameer Group, Airtel Kenya)	

== 2013 ==
Rank in Kenya	Name	Age	Citizenship	Net worth (USD)	Sources of wealth	Rank in Africa
1	Vimal Shah and family	60	Kenya	1.6 Billion	Food Processing: (Bidco Africa)	18
2	Naushad Merali	62	Kenya	0.43 Billion	Diversified: (Sameer Group, Airtel Kenya)	

== 2012 ==
Rank in Kenya	Name	Age	Citizenship	Net worth (USD)	Sources of wealth	Rank in Africa
1	Naushad Merali	61	Kenya	0.41 Billion	Diversified: (Sameer Group, Airtel Kenya)	

== 2011 ==
Rank in Kenya	Name	Age	Citizenship	Net worth (USD)	Sources of wealth	Rank in Africa
1	Uhuru Kenyatta and family	50	Kenya	0.6 Billion	Diversified: (Brookside, NCBA, Land holdings among other businesses)	26
2	Chris Kirubi	71	Kenya	0.3 Billion	Diversified: (Real estate holdings, Capital FM, Centum among other businesses)	31
3	Naushad Merali	60	Kenya	0.21 Billion	Diversified: (Sameer Group, Airtel Kenya)	33

== See also ==
- Economy of Kenya
- East African Community
- Forbes list of billionaires
- List of countries by the number of billionaires
- List of conglomerates in Kenya
- List of conglomerates in Africa
