= Jayesh Saini =

Kenyan businessman and entrepreneur

Jayesh Umesh Saini
- Born: Kenya
- Citizenship: Kenyan, Indian
- Occupation: Businessman
- Known for: Founder of Bliss Healthcare Limited
- Spouse: Shalya Saini

Jayesh Umesh Saini is a Kenyan businessman and billionaire who is the founder of Bliss Healthcare Limited.

== Early life and education ==
Saini was born and raised in Kenya from Indian heritage. He grew up with a significant level of understanding in healthcare management, attributed to mentorship by his father Dr Umesh Saini, who founded the Nairobi West Hospital in the 1980s.

== Career ==
Saini started his career in the healthcare industry in Kenya. He established a number of ventures focusing primarily on healthcare and medicine.

=== Bliss healthcare ===
In 2012, he founded Bliss Healthcare and became its chairman. It became one of Kenya’s largest outpatient healthcare network operating with over 80 medical centers nationwide. It offers consultation, specialty clinics, laboratory, pharmacy, radiology, optical, dental care and ambulance services.

=== Lifecare hospitals ===
In 2017, Saini founded Lifecare Hospitals. It become one of the fastest growing healthcare providers in Kenya. Lifecare hospitals ran multiple health facilities which were well-equipped and offered high quality medical services. The decentralization of Lifecare hospitals allowed it to serve a larger rural population as its facilities were spread across Kenya, enabling medical access to the previously isolated regions.

Lifecare Hospitals Group also invested in telemedicine, digital health platforms, and electronic health records. By 2025, the hospital group employed over 4,000 professionals.

=== Dinlas Pharma ===
Saini also owns Dilnas Pharama Ltd, a pharmaceutical firm worth $30 million. It specialises in supplying medical drugs across Africa.

== Controversy ==
=== NHIF scandal ===
Clinix Healthcare limited, in which Saini had a stake, was involved in the National Hospital Insurance Fund scandal in 2012 where the company is alleged to have received Ksh.91million from the insurance fund for services by medical facilities that were found to be non-existent and non-operational at the time of the disbursement of the funds. Officials from the company were charged in court for corruption allegation after several hearings into the probe by parliamentary health committee.

=== Adani-JKIA scandal ===
Saini was implicated in the dubious Adani-Jomo Kenyatta International Airport deal which was to see the airport leased to Adani Group for a period of 30 years. The deal was cancelled by president Ruto amidst sanctions by the US on Adani. He is alleged to have been an intermediary in orchestrating the deal. He has not commented on the allegations.

=== SHIF scandal ===
See also: Social Health Authority Scandal

Whistleblower Nelson Amenya revealing irregularities within Kenya’s public health sector under Social Health Authority (SHA) also implicated Saini as one of the shadowy figures allegedly exploiting the Social Health Insurance Fund (SHIF), compromising the integrity and accountability of public healthcare services. The fund has lost billions of Kenya shillings in irregular payments and corruption. Saini responded to Amenya’s disclosures by filing defamation suits in Kenya and France. A French court however, ruled in favour of Amenya and Saini was asked to pay for the damages for legal fees and wasted time.

== Personal life ==
Jayesh Saini is married to Dr. Shalya Saini.

== See also ==
- Aga Khan Health Services
- Kenya Medical Supplies Agency
- List of Wealthiest People in Kenya
- NHIF Civil Servants Scheme Scandal
- Manu Chandaria
