= Kenya Mortgage Refinance Company =

Kenyan financial institution

Coordinates: 01°17′58″S 36°49′09″E

- Company type: Public Private Partnership
- Industry: Banking
- Founded: August 1, 2018; 7 years ago
- Headquarters: Nairobi, Kenya
- Key people: Haron Sirima; Chairman; Johnstone Oltetia; Managing Director
- Products: Mortgage Loans
- Total assets: KES:37 billion (US$351 million) (2020)
- Website: Homepage

Kenya Mortgage Refinance Company Plc (KMRC), is a financial services company in Kenya, that specializes in lending to other financial institutions in the country, for onward lending in form of mortgages. In addition, KMRC buys good mortgages from other lenders to make more money available to banks for onward lending to eligible homeowners. It also plans to "invest in government debt securities or other guaranteed debt".

== Overview ==
The institution is a greenfield start-up, established in August 2018, as a public private partnership between the government of Kenya and the major mortgage lenders in the country. As of July 2020, it had shareholders equity of KES:2 billion (US$20 million), with committed total assets of KES:37 billion (US$351 million). At that time KMRC was awaiting regulatory approval to commence business operations.

== Operations ==
KMRC will be regulated and supervised by the Central Bank of Kenya. The KMRC Board of Directors will comprise seven individuals who will set policy that will govern and guide the company. The World Bank and the African Development Bank have committed to lend KES:25 billion (US$250 million) and KES:10 billion (US$100 million) respectively, to KMRC.

It is expected that KMRC will provide financing to mortgage institutions at 5 percent for onward lending at 7 percent to homeowners earning less than KES:150,000 (US$1,500) per month. Such a homeowner could borrow up to KES:4 million (US$40,000), paying KES:31,000 (US$310) monthly, for 20 consecutive years. This is approximately 50 percent of the least expensive mortgage product on the market, before KMRC began operations.

== Ownership ==
As of July 2020, the shareholders in the stock of Kenya Mortgage Refinance Company are as illustrated in the table below. Reliable sources have put the government's shareholding at 25 percent.

Shareholding in Kenya Mortgage Refinance Company
| Rank | Shareholder | Share Capital (KES) | Percentage Ownership |
|---|---|---|---|
| 1 | Government of Kenya | 500 million | 25.0 |
| 2 | International Finance Corporation | 200 million | 8.4 |
| 3 | Company for Habitat and Housing in Africa | 200 million | 8.4 |
| 4 | Kenya Commercial Bank | 600 million | 25.3 |
| 5 | Cooperative Bank of Kenya | 200 million | 8.4 |
| 6 | Diamond Trust Bank Group | 50 million | 2.1 |
| 7 | Housing Finance Company of Kenya | 50 million | 2.1 |
| 8 | NCBA Bank Kenya | 50 million | 2.1 |
| 9 | Absa Bank Kenya Plc | 50 million | 2.1 |
| 10 | Stanbic Holdings Plc | 20 million | 0.8 |
| 11 | Credit Bank | 10 million | 0.4 |
| 12 | Kenya Women Microfinance Bank | | |
| 13 | Kenya Police Sacco | | |
| 14 | Mwalimu Sacco | | |
| 15 | Safaricom Sacco | | |
| 16 | Ukulima Sacco | | |
| 17 | Bingwa Sacco | | |
| 18 | Imarisha Sacco | | |
| 19 | Unaitas Sacco Society Limited | | |
| 20 | Imarika Sacco | | |
| 21 | Tower Sacco | | |
| 22 | Stima Sacco | | |
| 23 | Harambee Sacco | | |
| | Total | 2,200 million | 100.00 |

== Licensing ==
In September 2020, the Central Bank of Kenya granted an operating license to KMRC. Homebuyers in the Nairobi Metropolitan Area, which covers Nairobi County, Kajiado County, Kiambu County and Machakos County, can finance up to a maximum of KSh4 million, through KMRC. For Kenya's remaining 43 counties, the maximum mortgage is KSh3 million.

== Operations ==
In December 2020, KMRC advanced the first four mortgage lenders varying amounts of money for onward lending to their customers. The funds are lent to the banks and Saccos at 5 percent per annum and the money is on-lent to mortgage customers at 10 percent per annum or less. The tale below illustrates the distribution of the first tranche to loans by KMRC to qualifying mortgage lenders. The lenders have seven years to repay the loans to KMRC.

First Tranche of Mortgage Funding From KMRC
| Rank | Mortgage Lender | Loan in KES | US$ Equivalent | Notes |
|---|---|---|---|---|
| 1 | KCB Bank Kenya Limited | 2.13 billion | 19.7 million | - |
| 2 | Housing Finance Company of Kenya | 514 million | 4.75 million | - |
| 3 | Kenya Stima Sacco | 69 million | 638,050 | - |
| 4 | Nyandarua Towers Sacco | 29 million | 268,166 | - |
| | Total | | | |

== See also ==
- List of banks in Kenya
- Central Bank of Kenya
- Economy of Kenya
