= DBK =

DBK may refer to

- DBK Historic Railway, a preserved railway association in Crailsheim, Germany
- Development Bank of Kenya, a commercial bank in Kenya
- Dragon Ball Kai or Dragon Ball Z, a Japanese anime television series
- Dubai Bank Kenya, a commercial bank in Kenya
- Kurdish Supreme Committee, Desteya Bilind a Kurd (DBK) in Kurdish, a former umbrella organization in Syria
- German Bishops' Conference, Deutsche Bischofskonferenz (DBK) in German, the episcopal conference of the bishops of the Roman Catholic dioceses in Germany
- Dylan Bennet Klebold (1981–1999), teenage mass murderer
