= KDIC =

KDIC may refer to:

- KDIC (radio station) (88.5 FM), a defunct radio station formerly licensed to serve Grinnell, Iowa, United States
- Kenya Deposit Insurance Corporation, a Kenyan organ for deposit insurance
- Korea Deposit Insurance Corporation, a South Korean semi-government organ for deposit insurance
- Korean Defense Intelligence Command, a South Korean military intelligence command under Defense Intelligence Agency
