= Euro Bank Scandal =

The Euro Bank Scandal is a scandal that in February 2003, caused a political storm in Kenya after the collapse of Nairobi Based Euro Bank. This resulted in a loss of 1.4bn Kenyan shillings (£11.6m; $18m) which state organisations had deposited in the Bank.

== State losses ==
The National Social Security Fund lost 256m shillings (£2.1m; $3.3m), the Kenyatta National Hospital 421m shillings with the biggest casualty being the National Hospital Insurance Fund, which lost 479m shillings in the collapse. Other state losses incurred were from Kenya Post Office Savings Bank Sh65 million, Kenya Tourist Development Corporation (KTDC) Sh60 million, Kenya Pipeline Company Sh55 million and Kenya Sugar Board Sh55 million.

== Resignations ==
The bank's collapse with pensions savings for thousands of workers, resulted in the resignation of Nahashon Nyagah the Governor of the Central Bank of Kenya for failing to prevent the loss. Also forced to resign was John Munge the Kenya Revenue Authority (KRA) Commissioner-General who was a director of Euro Bank, and had previously worked at another bank that collapsed.

== Court cases and aftermath ==
Five years after the scandal, little progress had been made in recovery of the lost funds. Some cases over the fraud at the bank have since been dropped following the death of key suspects including:

- Dr Augustine Muita - former director of Kenyatta National Hospital (KNH)
- Paul Songok - former financial director at Post Bank Limited
- Zachary Kamondo - One of Euro Bank's owners

Zachary Kamondo who initially fled to Scandinavia had most of his property seized was by the Government.

Some suspects arraigned in court were acquitted. They are:

- John Munge - former Kenya Revenue Authority boss and Euro Bank director
- Prof Julius Meme, a former director of Kenyatta National Hospital (KNH) and one-time Health permanent secretary
- Isaiah Kiplagat - former managing director Post Bank Limited
- Mr Solomon Muthamia a Kenyan banker and businessman who was entrusted with laundering the proceeds of Turkwell Gorge on behalf of Biwott and Moi.
- Mr Jamal Firdosh

Mr Muthamia & Mr Firdosh had been sued by Kenya Pipeline Company.

Most of the remaining cases had been referred to a constitutional court established in January 2004 after the accused challenged the Kenya Anti-Corruption Commission's legality in the prosecution.

These were former parastatal heads:

- Francis Chahonyo - Postal Corporation of Kenya
- Joshua Kiptoon - Pyrethrum Board of Kenya
- Ibrahim Hussein - National Hospital Insurance Fund

The attorney-general withdrew a case involving a former Euro Bank employee, Mr Peter Fernandez, whom the Kenya Anti-Corruption Commission had accused of stealing from the bank.

Mr Fernandez, alongside former colleagues Isaac Njagi and Jason Mutuma as well as his (Mr Fernandez's) employee, Mr Rikki Kimani, faced yet another case filed by NSSF for alleged destruction of exhibits.

Other cases involved

- Mr William Chelashaw (Kenya Tourist Development Corporation)
- Mr Ben Mtweta (NSSF)
- Mr Stanley Chemng'orem (Kenya Wine Agencies).
