= NCBA Bank Tanzania =

Tanzanian commercial bank

Coordinates: 06°48′41.5″S 39°17′15.0″E

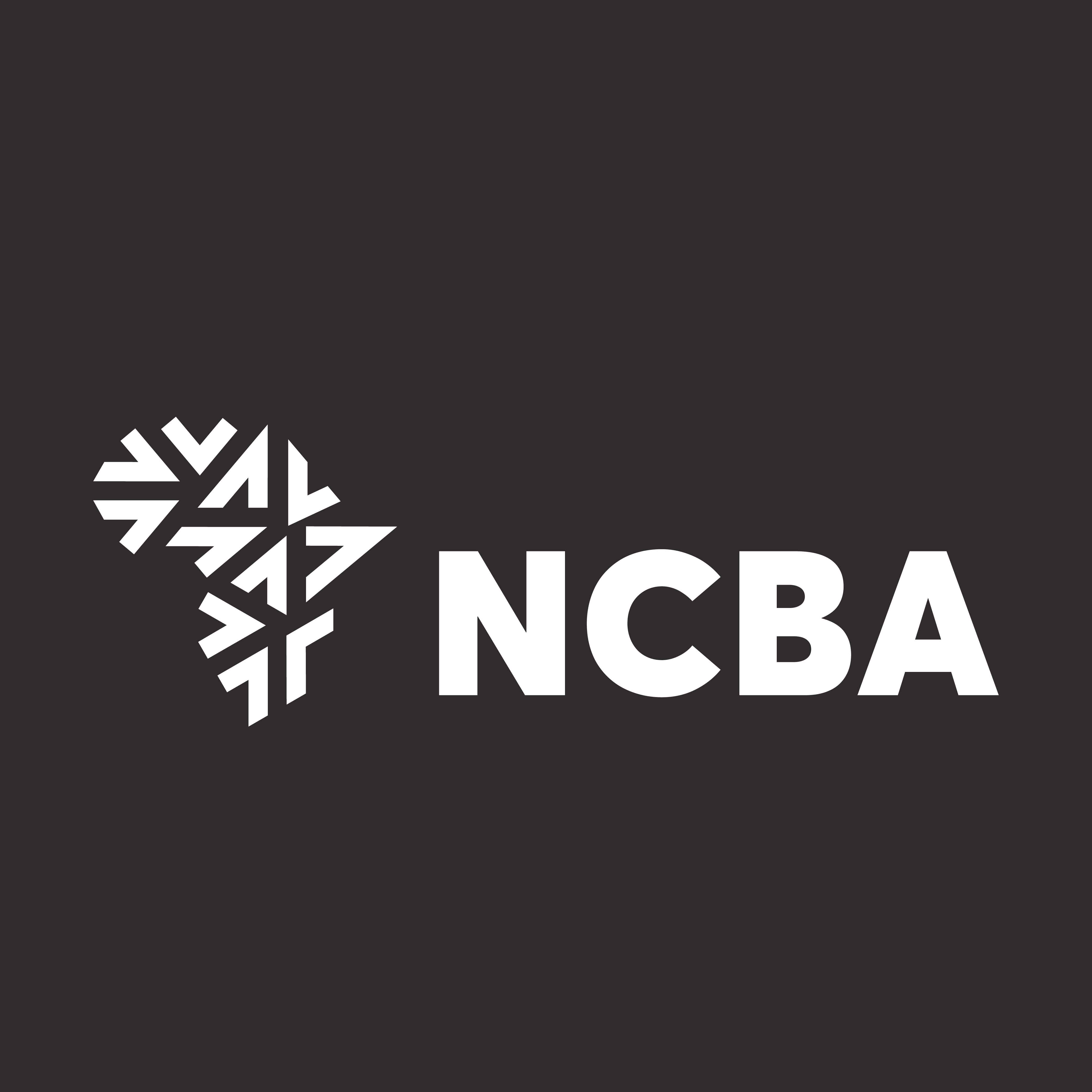
- Type: Subsidiary of NCBA Group Plc
- Industry: Banking
- Founded: 1962; 64 years ago
- Headquarters: Dar es Salaam, Tanzania
- Key people: Vinaykant Chhabildas Somaiya; Chairman, Claver Serumaga; Managing Director & CEO
- Products: Loans, transaction accounts, savings, investments, debit cards
- Total assets: TSh 428 billion (US$183 million) (Q4:2022)
- Website: tz.ncbagroup.com

NCBA Bank Tanzania Limited, is a merged bank between Commercial Bank of Africa (Tanzania) and NIC Bank Tanzania. It is a commercial bank in Tanzania licensed by the Bank of Tanzania, the central bank and national banking regulator.

== Location ==
The headquarters of the bank are located on the 1st, 2nd and 10th Floor, at Amani Place Building, along Ohio Street, in the central business district of Dar es Salaam, Tanzania's financial capital. The geographical coordinates of the bank's headquarters are:06°48'41.5"S, 39°17'15.0"E (Latitude:-6.811528; Longitude:39.287500).

== Overview ==
NCBA Bank Tanzania is a medium-sized financial services provider in Tanzania. Its total assets as of 31 December 2022 was approximately TSh 428 billion (US$183 million), with TSh 46.7 billion (US$19.9 million), in shareholders equity. At that time, it was categorized as a Tier II Commercial Bank in Tanzania. The bank is a subsidiary of NCBA Group Plc, a financial services conglomerate with headquarters in Kenya and subsidiaries in Kenya, Rwanda, Tanzania, Uganda and Ivory Coast.

== History ==
NIC Bank Tanzania started as a non-bank financial institution in 1994. In 2004, following the issuance of a banking license by the Bank of Tanzania, the institution converted into a fully fledged commercial bank, under the SFCB name. In May 2009, NIC Bank, a large financial services provider based in Nairobi and traded on the Nairobi Stock Exchange, took a 51 percent shareholding position in SFCB. During 2010, the Tanzanian subsidiary successfully re-branded to NIC Bank Tanzania.

Commercial Bank of Africa was founded in 1962 in Dar es Salaam. Branches were soon opened in Nairobi and Mombasa, Kenya and in Kampala, Uganda. When Tanzania nationalized private banks in 1967, the bank moved its headquarters to Nairobi. Following political changes in Uganda in 1971, the bank sold its assets in that country. In July 2005, the Commercial Bank of Africa (CBA) acquired majority shareholding in First American Bank of Kenya, which at the time had a Tanzanian subsidiary called United Bank of Africa.

== NCBA Group ==
In September 2019, NIC Bank Group received regulatory approval from the Central Bank of Kenya, to merge with Commercial Bank of Africa, forming the NCBA Group Plc, effective 1 October 2019.

In July 2020, having secured approval of the relevant banking regulators in Tanzania, NIC Bank Tanzania and Commercial Bank of Africa (Tanzania) merged to form NCBA Bank Tanzania.

== Ownership ==
As of September 2020, NCBA Bank Tanzania is a subsidiary and member of the NCBA Bank Group (NCBA Group Plc), whose shares of stock trade on the Nairobi Securities Exchange under the symbol: NCBA.

== Branch network ==
As of March 2023, the bank maintained branches at the following locations:

1. Amani Place Branch: Ohio Street, Dar es Salaam
2. Kijitonyama Branch: TTCL Building, Bagamoyo Road, Dar es Salaam
3. PSSSF Branch: Corner of Samora Avenue & Morogoro Road, Dar es Salaam
4. Nyerere Road Branch: Jamana House, Nyerere Road, Dar es Salaam
5. Kariakoo Branch: Corner of Sikukuu Street & Aggrey Street, Dar es Salaam
6. Clock Tower Branch: Clock Tower Street, TFA Building Arusha Arusha
7. Nyanza Branch: Nyanza Cooperative Union Building, Kenyatta Road, Mwanza
8. Zanzibar Branch: Muzammil Centre, Mlandege Street, Zanzibar.

== See also ==
- List of banks in Tanzania
- List of banks in Africa
- Economy of Tanzania
