= Vimal Shah =

Kenyan businessman

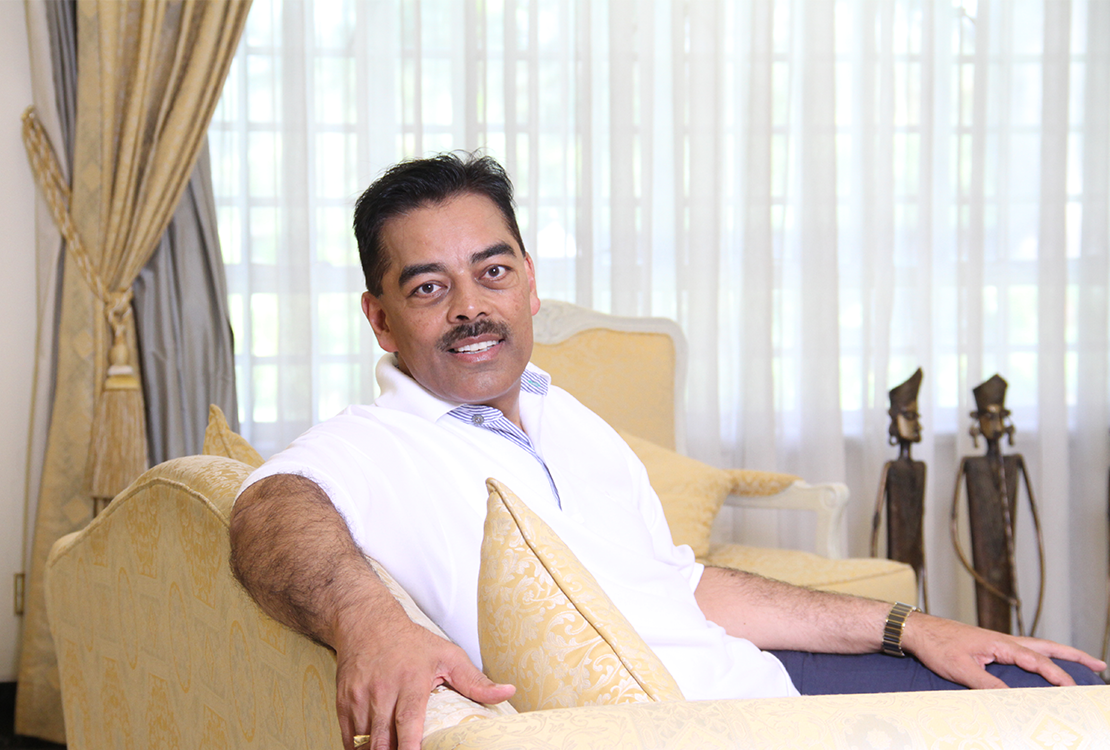
- Born: 1960 (age 65–66); Nyeri, Kenya
- Education: United States International University Africa
- Occupations: Businessman, entrepreneur, industrialist
- Years active: 1985–present
- Organization: Bidco Group of Companies
- Known for: Mentor of Small and Medium Sized business organizations
- Board member of: Bidco Group of Companies
- Spouse: Manda Shah
- Children: 1 (Soham Shah)
- Parent: Bhimji Depar Shah
- Relatives: Tarun Shah (Brother)
- Awards: Moran of the Order of the Burning Spear (MBS) (2004); Chief of the Order of the Burning Spear (CBS) (2011)

Vimal Shah is a Kenyan businessman, entrepreneur, mentor, and industrialist. He is the Chairman of Bidco Africa and is responsible for the company's growth into new markets and product. Bidco is a business conglomerate involved in the manufacture of edible oil, detergents, soaps, margarine and baking powder. He is reported to be one of the wealthiest individuals in Kenya.

== Early life and education ==
Shah was born in Nyeri, Kenya in 1960.

Vimal Shah attended the United States International University, Nairobi Campus, graduating with the degree of Bachelor of Science in Business Administration and Finance.

== Career ==
In 1985, Shah together with his father and brother decided to start a soap manufacturing business. When Kenyan banks denied them financing, they turned to family and friends instead. Growing cotton locally would take too much time, so they imported oil from Malaysia. Together with his father and brother, Vimal Shah built the business, growing the firm, BIDCO Africa, into one of Africa's largest companies. He rose to the position of CEO before stepping down in 2017. Since then, he has been less involved in the operational aspects of BIDCO, instead stepping up to a more strategic role as board chairman.

BIDCO Africa became one of Africa's largest and fastest growing manufacturer of domestic consumer products. They marketed and distributed a wide range of product categories in the East and Central African regions such as: Edible Oils, Cooking Fats, Margarine, Baking Products, Hygiene Products, Detergents, Laundry Bars and Animal Feeds

In a 2021 interview, Vimal Shah reflected on his family’s decision to stay in Kenya during uncertain political times, particularly after the 1980 business crisis that forced them to start over. Rejecting the path of emigration chosen by many contemporaries, Shah, along with his father and brother, rebuilt their enterprise from scratch—without institutional support or foreign relocation. He credits this moment as a defining turning point, shaping not just Bidco’s future, but his personal philosophy: “Kenyanness isn’t something you borrow—it’s something you live.”

In September 2023, President William Ruto appointed Shah as the Chancellor of Maasai Mara University for a five-year term.

Under Shah's chairmanship, Bidco Africa expanded its beverage operations in April 2024 by acquiring Suntory Beverage and Food Kenya, obtaining the regional rights to the Ribena and Lucozade brands. In July 2024, the company was named "African Company of the Year" at the African Business Leadership Awards.

== Wealth ==
In 2014, Forbes removed Vimal Shah as one of Africa's 50 richest people. Forbes Magazine, replacing Vimal Shah with his father, Bhimji Depar Shah, this replacement was due to "new information".

Forbes used their own methods to arrive at this figure, including the fact that BIDCO grossed US$500 million in sales in 2013. It has manufacturing factories in Kenya, Tanzania and Uganda. The group's products are marketed to 13 African countries.

== Business mentorship ==
From 2017 until 2018, Vimal Shah produced a blog aimed at mentoring small and medium-sized businesses in Kenya, East Africa and continental Africa. In his blog, he talked about his life as an entrepreneur in Africa, drawing from his experience as a successful entrepreneur since 1985.

== Personal life ==
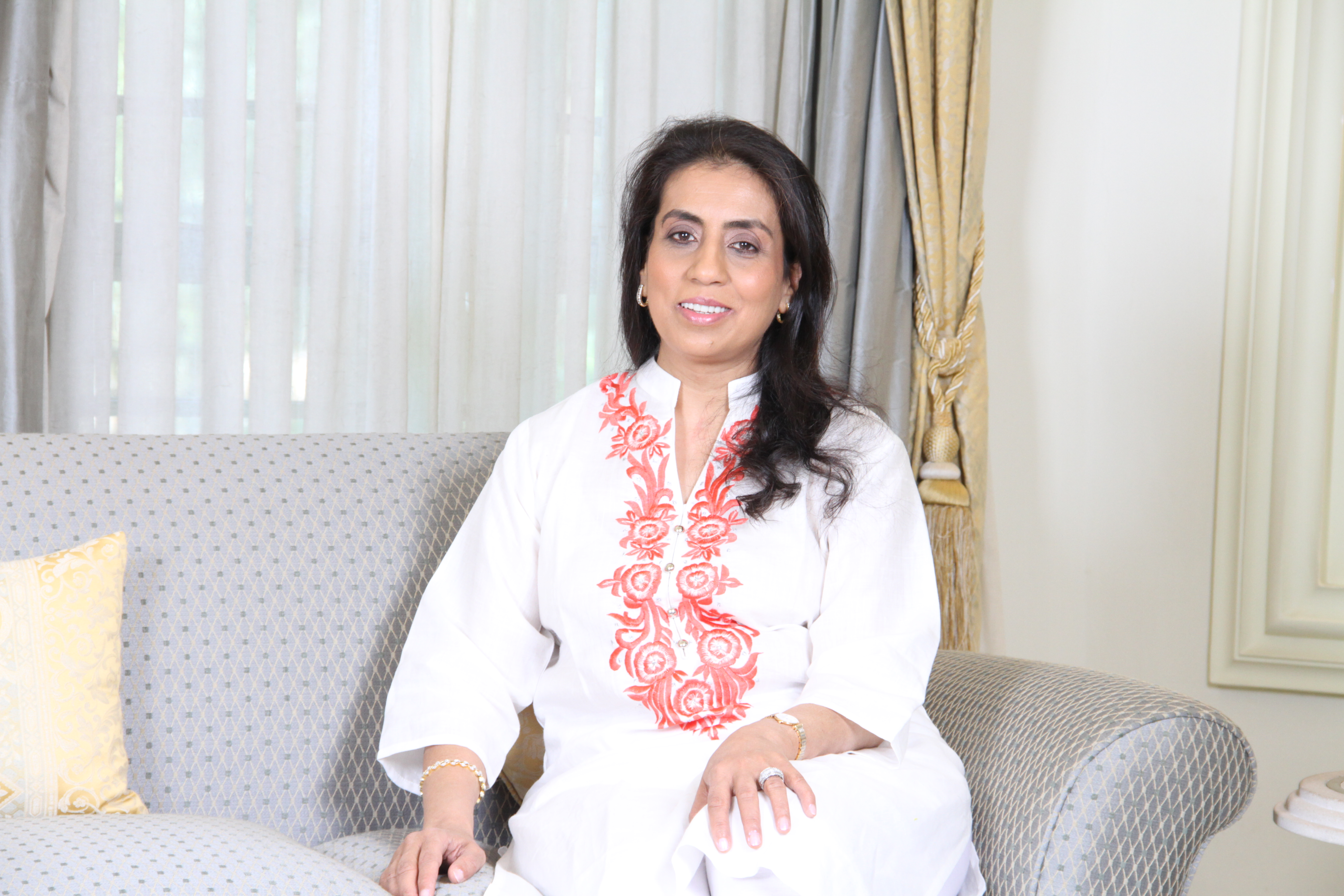
Manda Shah in 2016

Vimal Shah is a married to Manda Shah and is the father of one son, Soham Shah (born in 1998). He is a past chairman of the East African Business Council, the Kenya Association of Manufacturers and the Kenya Private Sector Alliance KEPSA. In March 2014 he was elected to the 3GF (Global Green Growth Fund) based out of Amsterdam.

== See also ==
- Devki Group
- Jayesh Saini
- List of wealthiest people in Kenya
- Economy of Kenya
