= KMRC =

KMRC may refer to:

- Kolkata Metro Rail Corporation - a rapid transit system in Kolkata, India
- KMRC (AM) - a radio station in Louisiana, United States
- Kenya Mortgage Refinance Company - a Kenyan mortgage refinance lender.
