= List of conglomerates in Kenya =

This is the list of conglomerates in Kenya.

#	Name	Headquarters	Nature of business
1	Sameer Group	Nairobi	agriculture, manufacturing, distribution, information technology, construction, transportation, finance
2	Nation Media Group	Nairobi	broadcasting, publishing, television, printing
3	I&M Bank Group	Nairobi	banking, insurance, restaurants, bars
4	Centum Investments	Nairobi	FMCG, publishing, automobiles, insurance, real estate
5	Transcentury	Nairobi	electric power, specialized engineering, financel, transport
6	Olympia Capital Holdings	Nairobi	building material, household chemicals, specialized engineering

== See also ==
- Conglomerates
- Africa conglomerates
- Uganda Conglomerates
- Wealthy Kenyans
- Kenya Economy
