= Commercial Bank of Africa =

Financial services provider in East Africa

- Type: Private Subsidiary
- Industry: Banking
- Founded: 1962
- Defunct: 30 September 2019
- Fate: Merged to NIC Bank
- Headquarters: Upper Hill, Nairobi, Kenya
- Key people: Desterio Oyatsi (Chairman), Isaac Awuondo (Managing Director)
- Products: Loans, credit cards, savings, investments, mortgages
- Revenue: ▲ Aftertax:US$36 million (KES:3,592 billion) (2015)
- Total assets: US$2.166 billion (KES:215.6 billion) (2015)
- Number of employees: 1,104 (2015)
- Parent: Commercial Bank of Africa Group
- Website: www.cbagroup.com/ke/index.php/home

Commercial Bank of Africa (CBA) was a financial services provider headquartered in Nairobi, Kenya, the largest economy in the East African Community. CBA was licensed by the Central Bank of Kenya, the central bank and national banking regulator.

As of December 2015, the bank was one of the largest commercial banks in Kenya with assets of approximately US$2.166 billion (KES:215.6 billion), with shareholders' equity of approximately US$217.83 million (KES:21.68 billion). It was the largest privately owned commercial bank in Kenya.

== History ==
The bank was founded in 1962 in Dar es Salaam, Tanzania. Soon, branches were opened in Nairobi & Mombasa, Kenya and in Kampala, Uganda. When Tanzania nationalised private banks in 1967, the bank moved its headquarters to Nairobi. Following political changes in Uganda in 1971, the bank sold its assets in that country.

At the beginning, CBA was owned by a consortium of financial institutions known as Société Financière pour les Pays d'Outre-Mer (SFOM), based in Switzerland. Original members of the consortium included Banque Nationale de Paris, Bank Bruxelles Lambert, Commerzbank, and Bank of America. In 1980, Bank of America acquired 84% shareholding, effectively buying out all the other SFOM partners. Sixteen per cent shareholding in CBA remained in the hands of Kenyan investors. During the 1980s Bank of America divested from the bank, putting 100% shareholding in CBA in the hands of Kenyan nationals.

In December 2018, Commercial Bank of Africa Group (CBA Group) announced that it would be merging with NIC Group creating the Kenya's third-biggest bank. The Transaction was approved by the Kenyan regulators and shareholders in April 2019. On 27 September 2019, the Central Bank of Kenya approved the merger, effective 1 October 2019. Through the merger, the combined group, NCBA Group, was to consolidate their banking business. This led to the transfer of business to one entity renamed NCBA Bank Kenya Limited.

== Ownership ==
Commercial Bank of Africa's ownership is under a shareholding structure. The Kenyatta family controls 24.91 percent of CBA through an investment vehicle called Enke Investments Limited. The table below illustrates the shareholding in the company stock, as of December 2017.

Commercial Bank of Africa Group Stock Ownership
Rank	Name of Owner	Percentage Ownership
1	Enke Investments Limited	24.91
2	Ropat Nominees Limited	22.50
3	Livingstone Registrars Limited	19.90
4	Yana Investments Limited	11.14
5	Ropat Trust Company Limited	5.37
6	Other Institutions & Individual	16.18
	Total	100.00

== Commercial Bank of Africa Group ==
Commercial Bank of Africa (Kenya) is a member of the CBA Group of companies. These include:

- Commercial Bank of Africa (Kenya) – Nairobi, Kenya – 100% shareholding
- Commercial Bank of Africa (Tanzania) – Dar es Salaam, Tanzania – 100% shareholding
- Commercial Bank of Africa (Uganda) – Kampala, Uganda – 100% shareholding
- Commercial Bank of Africa (Rwanda) – Kigali, Rwanda – 100% shareholding
- AIG Kenya Insurance Company Limited – Nairobi, Kenya – 33.33% shareholding. Balance of 66.67% shareholding in AIG Kenya held by the American International Group.

== Governance ==
The chairman of the board of directors is Desterio Oyatsi, one of the non-executive directors. Isaac Awoundo serves as the managing director.

Other executives include:

- Mr. Muhoho Kenyatta – deputy chairman
- Mr. Isaac Awoundo – group managing director
- Mr. Martin Mugambi – group executive director
- Mr. Jeremy Ngunze – chief executive – Kenya
- Mr. Stuart J Armitage – director
- Hon. Abdirahin Haithar Abdi – director
- Mr. Nicholas A. Nesbitt – director
- Mr. Nelson J.M Mainnah – director
- Mr. Mukesh K. R. Shah – director

== See also ==
- Commercial Bank of Africa (Tanzania)
- CBA Group
- List of banks in Kenya
- Central Bank of Kenya
- Economy of Kenya
