= NCBA Bank Kenya =

Retail bank in Kenya

NCBA Bank Kenya Plc
- Type: Subsidiary of NCBA Group Plc
- Traded as: Parent trades on NSE: NNIC
- Industry: Financial services
- Founded: 1959
- Headquarters: Nairobi, Kenya
- Key people: Isaac O. Awuondo; Chairman; John Gachora; Group Managing Director
- Products: Loans, Savings, Transaction accounts, Investments, Debit Cards, Credit Cards
- Revenue: ▲Aftertax:KSh7.7 billion (US$76 million) (Q3:2019)
- Total assets: KSh487.8 billion (US$4.88 billion) (Q3:2019)
- Number of employees: ~1,900 (2019)
- Parent: NCBA Group Plc
- Website: ke.ncbagroup.com

NCBA Bank Kenya, whose full name is NCBA Bank Kenya Plc, is a commercial bank in Kenya. It is licensed by the Central Bank of Kenya, the country's central bank and national banking regulator.

== Location ==
The bank's headquarters are located at NCBA Centre, at the junction of Mara Road and Ragati Road, in the neighborhood called Upper Hill, in Nairobi, the capital city of Kenya. The geographical coordinates of the group's headquarters are:01°17'52.0"S, 36°48'46.0"E (Latitude:-1.297778; Longitude:36.812778).

== Overview ==
NCBA Bank Kenya is a subsidiary of NCBA Group Plc, a large financial services provider in East Africa, and parts of West Africa. The group maintains its headquarters in Nairobi, Kenya. NCBA Group Plc owns subsidiary companies in Kenya, Uganda, Tanzania, Rwanda and the Ivory Coast. As of September 2019, NCBA Bank's total asset base was valued at about KSh487.8 billion (US$4.88 billion). At that time, the bank was ranked in position number three, by total assets, behind KCB Bank Kenya Limited and Equity Bank Kenya Limited.

== History ==
NIC Bank Kenya Plc roots trace back to 1959 when its parent company, NIC Group, was formed as a joint venture by Standard Bank Limited of South Africa and Mercantile Credit Company Limited of the United Kingdom. NIC was initially a non-bank financial institution (NBFI).

NIC Bank Kenya Plc was incorporated in 2016 as a result of the corporate reorganization of NIC Bank Group. Prior to January 2017, NIC Bank Group operated both as a licensed bank and a holding company for its subsidiaries.

On 12 September 2016, NIC Bank Group announced its intention to incorporate a new wholly owned subsidiary, NIC Bank Kenya Plc, to which it would transfer its Kenyan banking business, assets and liabilities. The rationale for the re-organisation is that by converting NIC Bank Group into a non-operating holding company (as defined under the Banking Act) that owns both banking and non-banking subsidiary companies in order to support the Group’s medium and long term strategy. The group reorganization was completed on 31 August 2017 upon approval from shareholders and the regulators.

In 2017, the Central Bank of Kenya appointed NIC Bank as asset and liabilities consultant for Imperial Bank Limited (in receivership). Effectively, NIC Bank took over the responsibility of returning funds to the failed bank's deposit customers. The agreement also allows NIC to acquire some of the deposits, assets and liabilities of Imperial once its receiver manager the Kenya Deposit Insurance Corporation starts liquidating the bank.

In December 2018, NIC Group announced that it would be merging with Commercial Bank of Africa Group (CBA) creating Kenya's third-biggest bank, by assets. The transaction was approved by the Kenyan regulators and shareholders in April 2019. CBK announces the merger of Commercial Bank of Africa Limited (CBA) and NIC Group PLC (NIC) effective September 30, 2019.

As of 18 May 2019, the merged group was still operating two sets of banks in Kenya, Uganda and Tanzania but was in the process of seeking regulatory approval to merge these business so that they can have one bank in each country and a group rebranding. On 27 September 2019, the Central Bank of Kenya approved the merger and name changes, effective 1 October 2019. The merged non-banking holding company became NCBA Group Plc and the Kenyan subsidiary of the merged entity became NCBA Bank Kenya Plc. The names of the merged entity in Tanzania, Rwanda, Uganda and Ivory Coast will re-brand accordingly.

== Branch network ==
As of 28 February 2020, NCBA Bank Kenya maintained 64 networked branches and 5 banking agencies in Kenya. NCBA Bank's partnership with the Kenya Post Office Savings Bank enables the provision of cash collection services for its customers through Postbank’s network of 94 branches in Kenya.

== NCBA Group ==
Members of the NCBA Group Plc include the following.

1. NCBA Bank Kenya – Retail banking – Nairobi, Kenya 100% Shareholding
2. NCBA Capital – Investment banking – Nairobi, Kenya 100% Shareholding
3. NCBA Capital Securities – Securities brokerage – Nairobi, Kenya – 100% Shareholding
4. NCBA Bank Tanzania – Retail banking – Dar es Salaam, Tanzania 69% Shareholding
5. NCBA Bank Uganda – Retail banking – Kampala, Uganda 100% Shareholding.
6. NCBA Bank Rwanda: Retail banking : Kigali, Rwanda 100% Shareholding
7. M-Shwari Mobile Banking: Mobile money bank service: Abidjan, Ivory Coast Joint Venture with MTN Group.

== Governance ==
The activities of NCBA Bank Kenya are directed by eleven board of directors. The managing director is assisted by 10 other senior Officers in supervising the day-to-day activities of the Bank.

== See also ==
- List of banks in Kenya
- Central Bank of Kenya
- Economy of Kenya
