= Imperial Bank Limited =

Commercial bank in Kenya

Imperial Bank Kenya
- Company type: Private
- Industry: Financial services
- Founded: 1993
- Headquarters: Nairobi, Kenya
- Key people: Alnashir Popat; Chairman; Naeem Shah; Ag. Managing Director
- Products: Loans, Checking, Savings, Investments, Debit Cards
- Revenue: ▲Aftertax:US$21.453 million (KES:1.854 billion) (2013)
- Total assets: US$497.7 million (KES:43 billion) (2013)
- Website: Homepage

Imperial Bank Limited commonly known as Imperial Bank, is a commercial bank in Kenya, the largest economy in the East African Community. It is one of the forty-three commercial banks licensed by the Central Bank of Kenya, the central bank and national banking regulator.

On 13 October 2015, the Central Bank of Kenya placed Imperial Bank under the management and control of the state's Kenya Deposit Insurance Corporation because of what the Central Bank termed as "unsafe and unsound business conditions" at the Bank. Separately, sources said an internal fraud scheme had occasioned the move.

The Central Bank of Kenya had hoped that owners of Imperial Bank would inject cash into the institution but has recently lamented that the shareholders had failed to make good on their promise.

Depositors of the troubled bank can now make their claims at any Central Bank of Kenya or Diamond Trust Bank Group branch and such claims will take three days to confirm their details before they are paid.

== Overview ==
Imperial Bank is a medium-sized retail bank that caters to both individuals and corporate clients. As of December 2013, the bank's total asset base was valued at about US$498 million (KES:43 billion), with shareholders equity of approximately US$66.2 million (KES:5.719 billion). At that time, Imperial Bank Limited was ranked the 19th largest Kenyan commercial bank, by assets, out of forty-three licensed banks in the country.

== History ==
Imperial Bank Limited was established in 1992 as a Finance and Securities Company. In 1996, the bank commenced commercial banking services, following the issuance of a banking license by the Central Bank of Kenya. In January 2011, the bank, in partnership with Mukwano Group, a Ugandan business and manufacturing conglomerate, opened a subsidiary, Imperial Bank Uganda, with headquarters at 6 Hannington Road, on Nakasero Hill, in the center of Kampala's central business district.

== Subsidiaries and Investments ==
The companies that comprise the Imperial Bank include the following:

1. Imperial Bank Kenya – Retail banking – Nairobi, Kenya – 100% Shareholding – A commercial bank in Kenya, serving individuals and businesses, focusing mainly on large corporations. This is the flagship company of the group.
2. Imperial Bank Uganda – Retail banking – Kampala, Uganda – 58.6% Shareholding – A commercial bank in Uganda.

== Ownership ==
The stock of the bank is privately held. The bank is a wholly owned subsidiary of Imperial Securities Limited. The detailed shareholding in Imperial Securities Limited is as follows:

Shareholder	Percentage held	Notes
Imaran Investments Limited	14.0	Alnashir Popat, the chairman, has a 50% interest in this company.
Abdumal Investments Limited	14.0	Anwar Hajee, Director, has a 50% interest in this company
Janco Investments Limited	13.5	Abdulmalek Janmohamed, the managing director, has a 50% interest in this company
Rex Motors Limited	12.5	
Kenblest Limed	12.5	Jinit Shah, Director, has a 50% interest in this company
Momentum Holdings Limited	12.5	Mukesh Kumar Patel, Director, has a 50% interest in this company
EA Motor Industries Limited	11.0	Vishnu Dhutia, Director, has a 50% interest in this company
Reynolds & Company Limited	10.0	Hanif Mohamed Amirali Somji, Director, has a 50% interest in this company
	100.0	

== Branch network ==
As of August 2014, the bank maintained a network of branches at the following locations:

1. Head Office – Imperial Court, Westlands Road, Westlands, Nairobi
2. Westlands Branch – Imperial Court, Westlands Road, Westlands, Nairobi
3. Upper Hill Branch – Bunyala Road, Upper Hill, Nairobi
4. IPS Branch – IPS Building, 8th Floor, Kimathi Street, Nairobi
5. Parklands Branch – Regal Plaza, Ground Floor, Limuru Road, 6th Avenue, Parklands, Nairobi
6. Card Centre – Regal Plaza, Ground Floor, Limuru Road, Parklands, Nairobi
7. Highridge Branch – Masari Road, Parklands, Nairobi
8. Mombasa Branch – Imperial Bank Building, Kaunda Avenue, Mombasa
9. Diani Branch – Beach Road Next to Collier Centre, Diani
10. Karen Branch – 1st Floor, Cross Roads Mall, Karen, Nairobi
11. Malindi Branch – Galana Centre, Lamu Road, Malindi
12. Watamu Branch – Tourist Road, Watamu
13. Thika Branch – Pushpa Plaza, Nkrumah Road, Thika
14. Eldoret Branch I – Imperial Court, Nairobi Road, Eldoret
15. Kilifi Branch – Kilifi Arcade, Biashara Street, Kilifi
16. Industrial Area Branch – Bamburi Road, off Enterprise Road, Nairobi
17. Village Market Branch – Village Market, Limuru Road, Gigiri
18. Riverside Branch – Riverside Green Suite, 1st Floor, Riverside Drive, Nairobi
19. Likoni Branch – Nova Holdings Complex, Nyerere Avenue, Mombasa
20. Haile Selassie Branch – Blueroom Building, Haile Selassie Road, Mombasa
21. Bamburi Branch – City Mall, 1st Floor, Bamburi, Mombasa
22. Changamwe Branch – Rhino Properties Refinery Place, Mombasa
23. Junction Branch – Junction Mall, Fourth Floor, Ngong Road, Nairobi
24. Nakuru Branch – Ground Floor, Westside Mall, Nakuru
25. Greenspan Branch – Manyanja Road, Off Outering Road, Nairobi
26. Eldoret Branch II – Laboso House, Kenyatta Street, Eldoret
27. Nyali Cinemax Branch – Nyali Cinemax, Mombasa.
28. Westgate Mall Branch-Nairobi
29. GardenCity Mall Branch – Thika Road
30. Lunga Lunga Branch – Industrial Area, Nairobi

== Governance ==
Alnashir Popat, a non-executive director of the bank, serves as the Chairman of the seven-member board of directors. Following the death of Abdulmalek Janmohamed in September 2015, Naeem Shah was named managing director, on an interim basis.

== Recent Developments ==
On 21 June 2016, the Central Bank of Kenya appointed NIC Bank as asset and liabilities consultant for Imperial Bank (in receivership). Effectively, NIC Bank took over the responsibility of returning funds to the failed bank's deposit customers. The agreement also allows NIC to acquire some of the deposits, assets and liabilities of Imperial once its receiver manager the Kenya Deposit Insurance Corporation starts liquidating the bank.

On 11 January 2017, IBL Depositors Lobby Group (a collaboration of investors affected by the continuously delayed and fraudulent Imperial Bank receivership of October 2015, drafted an open letter to the Central Bank of Kenya and Kenya Deposit Insurance Corporation (responsible for the receivership mandate) requesting a final statement regarding the ruling from Millimani Law Courts dated 4 November 2016 stating that 40% of the outstanding funds can and should be paid out to the effected parties awaiting their dues.

24 March 2017, Central Bank of Kenya extends the receivership for another 90 days expressing that the handlers of the receivership (Kenya Deposit Insurance Corporation) require more time.

3 May 2017, NIC Bank completes its process with assisting on the Imperial Bank Limited investigation and pay out structure.

== See also ==
- Imperial Bank Uganda
- List of banks in Kenya
- Central Bank of Kenya
- Economy of Kenya
