= Spire Bank =

- Type: Commercial bank
- Industry: Financial services
- Founded: 1983
- Headquarters: Nairobi, Kenya
- Key people: Teresa Mutegi (chairperson); Tim Gitonga (managing director)
- Revenue: ▲Aftertax:KSh.55.65 million/=+ (US$643,500) (2013)
- Total assets: KSh.15.562 billion/= (US$180 million) (2013)
- Website: spirebank.co.ke

Spire Bank, formerly known as Equatorial Commercial Bank, was a commercial bank in Kenya, the largest economy in the East African Community. It is licensed by the Central Bank of Kenya, the central bank and national banking regulator.

== Overview ==
The bank is a medium-sized financial institution, serving corporate clients, small and medium enterprises and individuals. As of December 2013, its total assets were valued at about KSh.15.562 billion/= (US$180 million), with shareholders' equity valued at about KSh.1.371 billion/= (US$16 million). At that time, the bank was ranked number 27, by assets, out of 43 banks licensed in Kenya. The company has a 20% investment in Equatorial Investment Bank Limited, and 23.86% in Fidelity Shield Insurance Company Limited, which have been accounted for as associate companies in the consolidated financial statements.

== History ==
Established as an Equatorial Finance Company in 1983, due to a change in regulation, Equatorial Finance Company was converted to Equatorial Commercial Bank Limited and commenced operations as a fully-fledged commercial bank in June 1995.

In June 2010, Equatorial Commercial Bank merged with Southern Credit Banking Corporation, creating a new enlarged bank under the Equatorial Commercial Bank brand. The merger was aimed at helping the banks meet the Central Bank of Kenya requirement for commercial banks to shore up their core capital to at least KSh.1 billion/= (approximately US$12 million).

The Equatorial Commercial Bank - Southern Credit Banking Corporation merger transaction was structured in the following four interlinked phases:

1. ECB implemented a KSh.264 million/= (approximately US$3.1million) rights issue to increase its authorised and issued share capital in order to meet the capital adequacy requirements of the merged bank.
2. By way of a share swap agreement, ECB acquired the full shareholding in SCBC, in exchange for its own shares, thereby making SCBC a wholly owned subsidiary of ECB. SCBC shareholders received 11.25% of the issued share capital of ECB.
3. ECB (now the parent company) and SCBC (the subsidiary) then executed an asset and portfolio (business) agreement to transfer all of ECB's banking business, assets and liabilities to SCBC who paid a fair consideration through the creation of new shares.
4. SCBC (the subsidiary) adopted the name Equatorial Commercial Bank Limited and retained the joint banking business while the former ECB (the parent) returned its banking licence to the Central Bank of Kenya for cancellation, and changed its name to Equatorial Holding Limited to become a non-operating holding company of the merged bank. All future subsidiaries and associate companies would be held by Equatorial Holding Limited.

The merger transaction consideration was entirely satisfied by the issue of shares, and there was no cash transaction.

In September 2014, Mwalimu Cooperative Savings & Credit Society Limited, Kenya's largest SACCO by assets, made a bid to acquire 51% shareholding in Equatorial Commercial Bank in a deal valued at KSh.1.7 billion/= (approximately US$18 million). This move was in line with the strategic objective of the society of expanding business opportunities. The acquisition, was to enable the SACCO to collect deposits from beyond its membership, access funds at lower rates, venture into trade finance and offer its members ATM services. The deal was concluded at the end of 2014 and in 2015, the SACCO acquired another 24 percent shareholding, bringing its ownership to 75 percent.

In July 2016, the bank was rebranded to Spire Bank.

In January 2023, the Central Bank of Kenya announced that Equity Group Holdings had acquired the business of Spire Bank. These were merged in to Equity Bank Kenya.

== Ownership ==
Prior to December 2014, As of August 2014, Naushad Merali of Sameer Group owned 85% of the bank's stock, with other entities owning the remaining 15%. In order to comply with Central Bank of Kenya directives, the bank began exploring ways to sell shares to outside investors and reduce the shareholding of the largest individual shareholder to 25% or less.

The shareholding in the bank stock, as at March 2016, is depicted in the table below:

Spire Bank stock ownership
Rank	Name of owner	Percentage ownership
1	Mwalimu National Holdings	75.0
2	Structured investment vehicle	21.0
3	Minority shareholders	4.0
	Total	100.00

In December 2020, The EastAfrican reported that Mwalimu SACCO had concluded the acquisition of the 25 percent shareholding in Spire Bank that the SACCO did not previously own. The price that Mwalimu paid was not immediately disclosed.

== Branch network ==
As of August 2014, the bank operates a network of branches at the following locations:

- Waiyaki Way Branch - Equatorial Fidelity Centre, Waiyaki Way, Nairobi
- Chester House Branch - Ground Floor, Chester House, Koinange Street, Nairobi
- Westlands Branch - Ground Floor, Westlands Mall, Westlands, Nairobi
- Hurlingham Branch - Priory Place, Argwings Kodhek Road, Nairobi
- Mombasa Road Branch - Sameer Business Park, Mombasa Road, Nairobi
- Industrial Area Branch - Avon Centre, Enterprise Road, Nairobi
- Moi Avenue Branch - Equatorial Commercial Bank Building, Moi Avenue, Mombasa
- Nyali Branch - Nyali Cinemax Complex, Kongowea Road, Nyali
- Kisumu Branch - Harley's House, Oginga Odinga Street, Kisumu
- Kakamega Branch - Jubilee Ironmongers Building, Canon Awori Road, Kakamega
- Eldoret Branch - Zion Mall, Uganda Road, Eldoret
- Nakuru Branch - Apple House, Nakuru-Nairobi Highway, Nakuru

== See also ==
- List of banks in Kenya
- Central Bank of Kenya
- Economy of Kenya
- Sameer Group
