= NHIF Civil Servants Scheme Scandal =

The NHIF Civil Servants Scheme Scandal(s) is a financial scandal at the National Hospitals Insurance Fund, which was then a government institution mandated to provide and manage health insurance for the Kenyan public.

== 2012 scandal ==
It involved irregularities that were revealed in the Kenya Civil Servants Scheme at the National Hospital Insurance Fund, in early 2012.

The alleged irregularities included payment to ghost clinics, unprocedural selection of clinics and creation of an unapproved unit at the NHIF.

The scandal was subject to a probe by the Health Parliamentary Committee. Most of the alleged claims were found to be incorrect with time by various enquiry commissions, however investigations are still going on.

== 2023 scandal ==
This scandal spanned between 2019 up to 2023. NHIF lost over Ksh.7 billion through fraudulent claims approved by then case management manager. Individuals involved in the scandal include Judith Otele the case management manager and his husband Humphrey Otele, Kennedy Otieno, Isaac Ali, Washington Okumu and others, totaling to around 10 people. An employee at NHIF, Khadija, revealed how Ms Otele and her husband would defraud the scheme, through approving false and inflated insurance claims, conflict of interest in approving claims to hospitals and referrals of patients to hospitals. Hospitals in India were also involved in the scheme with Otele colluding with overseas cartel hospitals in referring patients to India for medical treatment, after which the cost of the treatment would be agreed and she would approve them. Claims would also be amended while the patient was still abroad.

In 2023, eight private hospitals were involved in fraudulent and falsified claims that saw the insurer lose billions of Kenya shillings. The officials from the private hospitals were grilled by a parliamentary committee led by Mp. Rober Pokuse, which by then had been alleged to have been compromised as it was slagging in dealing with the probe. NHIF supended the hospitals. A report by the auditor general also revealed that NHIF management failed to explain expenditure of more than Sh7.4 billion, as per the report for the financial year ending June 30, 2023.

In 2024, auditor general Nancy Gathungu in a report revealed that NHIF lost Ksh.367 millions due to a "typing error" leading to excess payments. The excess payments were made under the National Police Service, NHC, Universal Health Care (UHC), civil servants, Edu Afya, county, parastatal, and Linda Mama schemes.

== See also ==
- Corruption in Kenya
- Social Health Authority Scandal
