= Crane Bank Rwanda =

Defunct Rwandan Bank

- Company type: Private
- Industry: Financial services
- Founded: 2014
- Headquarters: Kigali, Rwanda
- Key people: Edigold Monday; Managing Director
- Products: Loans, Checking, Savings, Investments, Debit Cards
- Total assets: US$13.7 million (UGX:38.1 billion) (2014)
- Website: Homepage

Crane Bank Rwanda was a commercial bank in Rwanda, licensed by National Bank of Rwanda, the central bank and national banking regulator. In June 2017, the Commercial Bank of Africa signed an agreement to acquire the assets to Crane Bank of Rwanda, pending regulatory approval.

== Overview ==
The bank began operations on Monday 30 June 2014, having received a full unrestricted banking license from NBR, one year earlier. The estimated total asset valuation of the institution at December 2014 was approximately US$13.7 million, with shareholders' equity of approximately US$8.6 million. The official exchange rate at 31 December 2014 was USh2,778 = US$1.00.

== Ownership ==
Crane Bank Rwanda was a 100% subsidiary of Crane Bank, the 3rd largest commercial bank in Uganda, the largest indigenous commercial bank in the country, with approximately US$620 million in total assets at December 2014.

In May 2017, CBA Rwanda, a microfinance institution, made public its intention to acquire Crane Bank Rwanda, a commercial bank, whose parent company in Uganda had been sold and the buyers of the parent did not want to keep the Rwandan subsidiary. On 15 June 2017 the CBA Group signed a definitive sale and purchase agreement with DFCU Bank, the owners of Crane Bank Rwanda. The acquisition required regulatory approval in Rwanda, Kenya and Uganda.

== Sale and acquisition ==
In February 2018, following approval by the National Bank of Rwanda, the Central Bank of Kenya and the Bank of Uganda, the CBA Group took over Crane Bank Rwanda. The acquired assets and liabilities, including three operational branches in Kigali, are expected to be merged with the existing micro-finance operations of CBA Rwanda.

== Ruparelia Group ==
Crane Bank Rwanda was a member of the Ruparelia Group, A Uganda-based conglomerate, that included a bank, insurance companies, foreign exchange bureaux, schools, radio stations, a university, hotels and resorts. In October 2016, the Bank of Uganda took over the administration of Crane Bank and its subsidiaries, due to under-capitalization. In January 2017, DFCU Bank purchased the assets and liabilities of Crane Bank. Crane Bank Rwanda was sold to the Commercial Bank of Africa Group in February 2018.

== Branches ==
As of July 2015, CBR maintains the following branches:

1. Main Branch - 10249 Ville De Kigali, Nyarugenge, Muhima, Kigali
2. La Bonne Adresse Branch -5447 La Bonne Adresse Building, 76 Avenue de la Revolution, Kigali.

== See also ==
- NBR
- Rwanda Banks
- Uganda Banks
- Sudhir Ruparelia
- Africa conglomerates
