= NCBA Group =

Kenyan financial services conglomerate

Coordinates: 01°17′52″S 36°48′46″E

NCBA Group plc
- Trade name: NCBA Group
- Formerly: NIC Bank Group; National Industrial Credit Bank Ltd
- Type: Public
- Traded as: KN: NINC
- Industry: Banking and finance
- Founded: 29 September 1959; 67 years ago
- Headquarters: Nairobi, Kenya
- Key people: J.P.M.Ndegwa; Group Chairman; John Gachora; Group CEO
- Products: Loans, mortgages, investments, debit cards, credit cards, mobile money
- Revenue: ▲Aftertax:US$58 million (KES:6.09 billion) (2019)
- Total assets: US$4.43 billion (KES:464.89 billion) (2019)
- Number of employees: ~2,400 (2019)
- Website: www.ncbagroup.com

NCBA Group (officially NCBA Group plc; formerly NIC Bank Group or National Industrial Credit Bank Limited) is a financial services conglomerate in East and West Africa. The Group's headquarters are located in Nairobi, Kenya, with subsidiaries in Kenya, Tanzania, Rwanda, Uganda and Ivory Coast.

== Location ==
The group's headquarters are located along Mara Road, in the neighborhood called Upper Hill, in Nairobi, the Capital City of Kenya. The geographical coordinates of the group's headquarters are:01°17'52.0"S, 36°48'46.0"E (Latitude:-1.297778; Longitude:36.812778).

== Overview ==
NCBA Group Plc is a large financial services organization in East and West Africa, with assets valued at over $4.43 billion (KSh 464.89 billion) as of December 2019. Shareholders' equity at that time was valued at approximately $661 million (KSh 69.416 billion). The group functions as a non-operating holding company for its subsidiaries in the region. As of October 2019, the group serviced an estimated 40 million customers in four East African countries and in one West African country.

== History ==
=== 1959–1990 ===
National Industrial Credit (NIC) was incorporated in Kenya on 29 September 1959, when South Africa-based Standard Bank and United Kingdom-based Mercantile Credit Company Limited jointly formed the company to provide hire purchase and installment credit finance facilities in East Africa. Standard Bank held 40 percent of the venture while Mercantile Credit held the remaining 60 percent.

In 1971, NIC became a public company and was listed on the then Nairobi Stock Exchange (NSE). Barclays Bank of Kenya Limited (BBK) acquired 51 percent of NIC's total shares through the acquisition of Mercantile in the 1970s and Standard's NIC shares in the 1980s.

=== 1991–1999 ===
Between 1993 and 1996, BBK divested its shares, selling 38 percent of its shares to the public in 1994 through a secondary market offering and the remaining 20 percent in 1996 to the First Chartered Securities Group (FCS). Because of changing trends, regulatory requirements in the Kenyan banking industry, and the need to meet growing customer requirements, NIC obtained a commercial banking license from the Central Bank of Kenya in September 1995.

To effectively diversify into mainstream commercial banking, NIC merged in November 1997 with African Mercantile Bank Limited, which was then owned by FCS, by way of a share swap. The purpose of this merger was to allow NIC to enhance its market position, provide a broader and more efficient range of services to its customers, and increase the returns to shareholders.

=== 2000–2008 ===
In 2006, NIC established an investment bank NIC Capital as a wholly owned subsidiary. In 2008, NIC through its subsidiary NIC Capital acquired a 91 percent stake in Solid Securities Limited and subsequently re-branded it to NIC Securities Limited. This acquisition gave NIC Bank Group a seat at the NSE.

=== 2009-To Date ===
In 2009 NIC Bank Group established NIC Insurance Agents to offer insurance brokerage and bancassurance services. In the same year, the Group made its first expansion outside Kenya through its acquisition of a 51 percent share of Savings and Finance Commercial Bank, a medium size bank in Tanzania. In December 2010, the Savings and Finance Commercial Bank was renamed NIC Bank Tanzania Limited. In 2012, the group established operations in Uganda through NC Bank Uganda. This was a greenfield investment.

NIC Group logo prior to 2019 merger

In December 2018, NIC Group announced that it would be merging with Commercial Bank of Africa Group (CBA) creating Kenya's third-biggest bank. The merger involved the transfer of 100 percent of the shares of CBA Group by its shareholders to NIC Group in exchange for 53 percent of the newly formed group making the deal a reverse merger.

The Transaction was approved by the Kenyan regulators and shareholders by April 2019. As of May 2019, the merged group was still operating two sets of banks in Kenya, Uganda and Tanzania but was in the process of seeking regulatory approval to merge these business so that they can have one bank in each country and a group re-branding.

=== Merger history ===
The following is an illustration of NCBA Group's major mergers and acquisitions and historical predecessors (this is not a comprehensive list):

- NCBA Group Plc
  - NIC Bank Group (2017 group reorganisation)
    - NIC Bank Ltd
      - National Industrial Credit
        (est. 1959)
      - African Mercantile Bank
        (acquired 1997)
    - Solid Securities Ltd
      (acquired 2008)
    - Savings and Finance Commercial Bank (Tanzania)
      (acquired 2010)
  - Commercial Bank of Africa Group (acquired 2019)
    - Commercial Bank of Africa
      (est. 1962)
    - First American Bank of Kenya
      United Bank of Africa (Tanzania)
      (acquired 2005)
    - Crane Bank Rwanda
      (acquired 2017)

== Member companies ==
NCBA Group maintains the following subsidiaries, as of April 2020.

1. NCBA Bank Kenya: Retail banking: Nairobi, Kenya – 100 percent shareholding – A commercial bank in Kenya, serving individuals and businesses, focusing mainly on large corporations. This is the flagship company of the group.
2. NCBA Investment Bank Limited: Investment banking: Nairobi, Kenya – NCBA Investment Bank was established in 2005 to offer investment banking services. The group owns all the shares in the unit.
3. NCBA Insurance Agents: Bancassurance– Nairobi, Kenya – NCBA Insurance Agents offers Bancassurance services. NCBA Group owns all of the company.
4. NCBA Bank Tanzania: Retail banking: Dar es Salaam, Tanzania. After a successful rights issue in 2013, NIC Group's interest in its Tanzanian subsidiary rose from 51 percent to 68.97 percent.
5. NCBA Bank Uganda: Retail banking: Kampala, Uganda. The group owns all of the shares of the unit.
6. NCBA Bank Rwanda: Retail banking: Kigali, Rwanda.
7. M-Shwari Mobile Banking: Mobile money bank service: Abidjan, Ivory Coast.
8. AIG Kenya Insurance Company Limited: Offering general insurance: Nairobi, Kenya – 33.33 percent shareholding the balance held by the American International Group.

== Ownership ==
The stock of NCBA Bank Group is listed on the Nairobi Stock Exchange, where it trades under the symbol NINC. As of December 2019, the largest shareholders in the Group's stock are as depicted in the table below:

NCBA Group Plc Stock Ownership
Rank	Name of Owner	Percentage
1	Enke Investments Limited	13.21
2	Ropat Nominees Limited	11.93
3	Livingstone Registrars Limited A/C No. 1	10.56
4	First Chartered Securities Limited	7.45
5	Yana Investments Limited	5.91
6	ICEA LION Asset Management Limited	4.23
7	Others	46.71
	Total	100.00

== See also ==
- List of banks in Kenya
- Nairobi Stock Exchange
- Central Bank of Kenya
