= Commercial Bank of Africa (Uganda) =

Commercial bank in Uganda

NCBA Bank Uganda Limited
- Type: Subsidiary
- Industry: Banking
- Founded: 2014
- Headquarters: Twed Towers, 10 Kafu Road, Nakasero, Kampala, Uganda
- Key people: Grace Jethro Kavuma; Chairman; Mark Muyobo; Acting Managing Director
- Products: Loans, savings, transaction accounts, investments, debit cards, credit cards, mortgages
- Parent: NCBA Group
- Website: cbagroup.com/uganda/

The Commercial Bank of Africa (Uganda) (CBAU) is a commercial bank in Uganda. The bank opened in 2014, following the issuance of a commercial banking license by the Bank of Uganda, the central bank and the national banking regulator. The bank is a member of the Commercial Bank of Africa Group (CBA Group), headquartered in Nairobi, Kenya.

NCBAU serves the banking needs of individuals and businesses in Uganda. It focuses on meeting the banking needs of large corporations, diplomatic missions, non-governmental organizations, and high net-worth private clients. The parent company raised KES:1.5 billion from its shareholders to finance CBAU.

== History ==
The NCBA Group, the parent company, was founded in 2019 in Nairobi, Kenya. Branches were then opened in Nairobi and Mombasa, Kenya and in Kampala, Uganda. In 1969, the bank sold its assets in Uganda to Barclays Bank of Uganda.

In October 2011, the CBA Group announced plans to enter Uganda. In February 2013, Kenyan print media reported that the CBA Group was waiting on approval from the Bank of Uganda to open CBAU's first branch in Kampala, the country's capital. In January 2014, the necessary approval was granted and CBAU became the 26th commercial bank in the country.

In January 2016, CBAU applied to the Bank of Uganda to be allowed to make loans using the mobile money platform, in partnership with cellular telephone provider MTN Uganda. If permission is granted, the bank will become the first Ugandan commercial bank to provide this service.

== Branch network ==
As of August 2016, the bank maintained branches at these locations:

- Main Branch - Twed Towers, 10 Kafu Road, Nakasero, Kampala
- Bugoloobi Branch - The Village Mall, Bugolobi, Kampala.

== See also ==
- List of banks in Uganda
- Economy of Uganda
