= Imarisha Cooperative Savings and Credit Society Limited =

Financial Services company

- Company type: Private
- Industry: Financial services
- Founded: 1978
- Headquarters: Kericho, Kenya
- Key people: Mathew Ruto (chairman), Mathew Rotich (chief executive officer)
- Products: Loans, Checking, Savings, Investments, Debit Cards
- Total assets: US$142 million (KES:21billion) (2025)
- Website: www.imarishasacco.co.ke

Imarisha Cooperative Savings and Credit Society Limited, also known as Imarisha Sacco Limited, but often referred to as Imarisha Sacco, is a savings and credit co-operative society (Sacco) in Kenya, the largest economy in the East African Community.

Imarisha Sacco is a small financial services provider in Kenya. As of December 2025, it was the seventh-largest Cooperative Savings and Credit Society in Kenya, with total assets of approximately US$142 million (KSh21 billion). At that time, its membership numbered in excess of 250,000, with shareholders' equity of about US$37 million (KSh3.2 billion).

== History ==
The society was established in 1978, under the name: Kipsigis Teachers Sacco, with the support of two teachers' unions, namely the Kenya National Union of Teachers (KNUT) and the Kenya Union of Post Primary Education Teachers (KUPPET). With an initial membership of 100 teachers, the objective was to meet the financial needs of teachers, using funds mobilized from the members. In 2014, the society rebranded to its current name and began to accept members outside the teaching profession.

== Ownership ==
The shares of stock of Imarisha Sacco Limited are privately owned and publicly undisclosed.

== Branches ==
As of January 2023, the society maintains a network of branches at the following locations:

1. Kericho Head Office - Imarisha Teachers Sacco Building, Nakuru-Kericho Highway, Kericho
2. Bomet Branch - Imarisha Teachers Sacco Building, Bomet
3. Bureti Branch - Imarisha Sacco Building, Sotik-Kericho Highway, Bureti
4. Mulot Branch-Bomet-Narok Highway, Mulot
5. Keringet Branch-Keringet Mall
6. Awasi Branch-At Awasi-Chemelil Junction
7. Ndanai Branch-Ndanai Enterprises Limited Building
8. Nandi Hills Branch-Kolongei Building
9. Narok Branch-Oltalet Mall
10. ELdoret Branch-Zion Mall Building
11. Nairobi Branch-Embankment Plaza
12. Nakuru Branch-Salman Centre
13. Kilgoris Branch-Along Olalui Road
14. Kisumu Marketing Outlet-Swan Centre
15. Fort-Tenan marketing outlet

== See also ==
- Mwalimu National Sacco
- Unaitas Sacco
- Kenya Banks
- Kenya Economy
