= Dubai Bank Kenya =

Commercial bank in Kenya

- Company type: Private
- Industry: Financial services
- Founded: 1982
- Fate: Liquidation
- Headquarters: Nairobi, Kenya
- Key people: Hassan Zubeidi; Chairman; Binay Dutta; Managing Director
- Products: Checking, Savings, Investments, Debit Cards
- Revenue: ▲ Aftertax: US$38,400+ (2008)
- Total assets: US$34.4 million (KES:2.92 billion) (2013)
- Website: Homepage

Dubai Bank Kenya (DBK), whose complete name is Dubai Bank Kenya Limited, but is often referred to as Dubai Bank, was a commercial bank in Kenya, the largest economy in the East African Community. It was licensed by the Central Bank of Kenya, the central bank and national banking regulator. The institution is not affiliated with Dubai Bank of United Arab Emirates or with that bank's parent company, Dubai Banking Group.

== Overview ==
DBK was a small bank in Kenya, East Africa's largest economy. As of December 2013, the bank's total assets were valued at about US$34.4 million (KES:2.92 billion). As of December 2013, the bank was ranked number forty-three, by assets, out of forty-three licensed commercial banks in Kenya. In August 2015, the bank was placed under receivership by the Central Bank of Kenya.

== History ==
The bank was established in 1982, originally as a branch of Bank of Oman. The assets and liabilities of the bank were subsequently acquired by Mashreq Bank Plc. In 2000, those assets and liabilities were acquired by the present shareholders, who rebranded the institution to Dubai Bank Kenya Limited.

== Liquidity Crisis and closure ==
On August 14, 2015, Dubai Bank was placed under statutory management by the Central Bank of Kenya for a period of one year with Kenya Deposit Insurance Corporation (KDIC) as the receiver manager. The bank had been experiencing liquidity and capital deficiencies and breaching its daily cash reserve ratio. These factors raised concerns on whether the bank would be able to meet its financial obligations. KDIC's report to the CBK on August 24, 2015 showed that there was no way to save the troubled bank and recommended that the bank be liquidated.

== Ownership ==
As of August 2014, Dubai Bank Kenya was a privately held company whose owners are not widely, publicly known.

== Branch network ==
The bank maintained a network of branches at the following locations:

1. Main Branch - I.C.E.A. Building, Kenyatta Avenue, Nairobi
2. Eastleigh Branch - Baraka Plaza, Sixth Street, Eastleigh, Nairobi
3. Mombasa Branch - Taiyebi House, Nkrumah Road, Mombasa
4. Nakuru Branch - Vickers House, Kenyatta Avenue, Nakuru

== Governance ==
Before being placed under receivership, the bank was governed by a six-person Board of Directors. Hassan Zubeidi, one of the non-executive directors is the Chairman of the Board. The managing director was Binay Dutta.

== See also ==
- List of banks in Kenya
- Central Bank of Kenya
- Economy of Kenya
