= John Gachora =

- Born: 1968 (age 57–58); Gatamaiyu, Kenya
- Education: Massachusetts Institute of Technology (BSc. in Electrical Engineering) (MSc. in Electric Engineering); Wharton Business School (Master of Business Administration)
- Occupations: Engineer & Bank Executive
- Years active: 1994 - present
- Title: Group Managing Director & Group CEO; NCBA Group Plc

John Gachora is an electrical engineer and bank executive in Kenya, the largest economy in the East African Community. He is the Group managing director and group chief executive officer of NCBA Group, a banking conglomerate, with subsidiaries in Kenya, Tanzania, Uganda and Rwanda.

== Background and education ==
Gachora was born in Gatamaiyu Village in Kenya's Central Province to subsistence farmers in 1968, the eighth born in a family of thirteen children. He attended Alliance High School. While there, he traveled to the United States as a high school exchange visitor to Brooks School in Andover, Massachusetts. While there, he applied to and was accepted by the Massachusetts Institute of Technology (MIT). He earned both the Bachelor of Science and the Master of Science degrees in Electrical Engineering. Later, in 2002, he received the Executive Master of Business Administration from the Wharton School of Business.

== Career ==
After his master's degree at MIT, he found employment on Wall Street with Credit Suisse. Later, he worked at Bank of America's corporate headquarters in Charlotte, North Carolina, rising to the rank of managing director - group head, investment banking. In January 2009, he joined Absa Capital in Johannesburg, South Africa, rising to the rank of chief executive officer of Absa Africa at Absa Group Limited, in November 2010. In September 2013, he was appointed group managing director and group CEO of NIC Bank Group. In 2019, following the merger of NIC Group PLC and Commercial Bank of Africa Limited, he was appointed the group managing director and group CEO of NCBA Group, a position he still occupied as of August 2024.

== Other considerations ==
Gachora is a married father of three children.

== See also ==
- NCBA Group
- List of banks in Kenya
- List of banks in Tanzania
- List of banks in Uganda
