= Unaitas Sacco Society Limited =

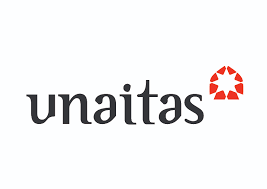
- Company type: Private
- Industry: Financial services
- Founded: 1993
- Headquarters: Nairobi, Kenya
- Key people: James Kinoro; Chairman; Martin Muhoho; Chief Executive Officer
- Products: Loans, Savings, ATM Debit Cards, Mobile Banking Service
- Revenue: ▲:Aftertax:KSh428 million ($US4.29 million) (2015)
- Total assets: KSh9.3 billion (US$93.2 million) (2015)
- Website: www.unaitas.com

Unaitas Sacco Society Limited, whose full name is Unaitas Savings & Credit Cooperative Society Limited, also Unaitas Sacco, is a savings and credit co-operative society (Sacco) in Kenya. Membership includes individuals, investment groups and small businesses.

== Overview ==
Unaitas Sacco is a medium-tier financial services provider in Kenya. As of December 2015, the society's asset base was valued at KSh9.3 billion (US$93.2 million), and a loan book of approximately KSh7.42 billion (approx. US$74.35 million). At that time, shareholders' equity was valued at more than KSh3.6 billion (approx. US$36.07 million) and membership was more than 230,000.

== History ==
The society was established in 1993 as Murang'a Tea Growers' Society, by a group of farmers, who pooled resources to create a financial institution where they could save and borrow at affordable rates. In 2007, the Sacco expanded beyond Murang'a and it admitted members who are not tea growers and small businesses. The name was changed to Muramati Sacco and eventually to Unaitas Sacco in 2012.

== Branches ==
As of December 2016, the society maintains a network of branches at the following locations:

1. Cardinal Otunga Branch - Cardinal Otunga Plaza, Kaunda Street, Nairobi
2. Naivasha Branch - Penibrah House, Moi Avenue, Naivasha
3. Kawangware Branch - Muhu Holdings House, Naivasha Road, Kawangare, Nairobi
4. Juja Branch - Opposite JKUAT University Main Gate, Juja.
5. Thika Branch - Kwame Nkrumah Road, Thika
6. Mlolongo Branch - Old Mombasa Road, Nairobi
7. Kasarani Branch - Kasarani Mwiki Road, Kasarani, Nairobi
8. Ongata Rongai Branch - Rongai Business Hub, Ongata Rongai, Nairobi
9. Temple Road Branch - Gatkim Plaza, Temple Road, Nairobi
10. Muranga Branch - Unaitas Building, Murang'a
11. Kangare Branch - Unaitas Building, Kangare
12. Kanyenya-ini Branch - Unaitas Building, Kanyenya-ini
13. Gatura Branch - Unaitas Building, Gatura
14. Kahatia Branch - Unaitas Building, Kahatia
15. Kiria-ini Branch - Kiria-ini - Murang'a Road, Kiria-ini
16. Kisumu Branch - Kisumu - Kakamega Road, opposite Kibuye Market
17. Kisii Branch - Opposite Tuskys Echiro
18. Mununga Branch - Mununga
19. Kangema Branch - Kangema
20. Githumu Branch - Unaitas Building, Murang'a
21. Gikumba branch
22. Meru branch -union square building, along Meru -Makutano road
23. Nakuru Pioneer Branch - Pioneer Building, Mburu Gichia Road, Nakuru
24. Gatundu Branch - Gatundu House, Nairobi

== See also ==
- Imarisha Sacco
- Mwalimu Sacco
- Kenya Banks
- Muramati Sacco
