= Social Health Authority Scandal =

Corruption scandal in Kenya

The Social Health Authority Scandal (SHA scandal) is a corruption scandal involving the Social Health Insurance Fund (SHIF) managed by the Social Health Authority, which is Kenya's State institution mandated to provide and manage public health insurance within the country. SHIF is a Kes.104 billion system implemented to replace the old National Health Insurance Fund (NHIF), as part of the Kenya Kwanza administration's new portfolios. SHA is under the responsibility of Kenya's the Ministry of Health

== Overview ==
The scandal occurred in a period spanning over a year, from SHA's inception to its continued operation.

=== Unlawful procurement ===
In March 2025, Kenya's auditor general, Nancy Gathungu revealed irregularities in the procurement of the technology used to manage SHA system. In a report she highlighted unbudgeted and non-competitive procurement, an undefined scope of work, and a lack of payment agreements as the legal violations done in the procurement process. The ownership of the system was also questioned as it emerged that it was being managed by a private consortium.

=== Fraudulent claims ===
The ministry of health has lost taxpayer's money over Ksh.5 billion through fraudulent claims that have been made to "ghost" hospitals which appear only on paper but not existent hospitals on ground. The non-existent hospitals, some which on paper are stated as maternal health care centres have been receiving payments from the Social Health Insurance Fund (SHIF) for services not rendered. The same has been the case for some existing hospitals receiving fraudulent claims, for instance, claims for ICU or HDU care services, maternal services, yet the hospitals do not offer the said services. Some converted outpatient claims to inpatient claims, performed double billing, pre-authorisation code abuse, admitted non-existent patients, and made clams from the insurance fund for the "services" rendered.

In January 2026, it was revealed by a Ministry of Health audit, that SHA lost Ksh.11 billion to fraud between October 2024 to April 2025 with the bulk of fake claims being submitted from private hospitals.

== Public uproar ==
Kenyans have expressed anger and disappointment both online and on-ground towards the government for not taking appropriate measures in combating these embezzlement of health insurance resources, which are paid for by Kenyan citizens in form of monthly deductions from their payslips. There have been relentless calls for transparency and accountability from the health ministry and SHA officials.

Kenyans have taken to social media, especially on X, to expose the continued financial malfeasance. Some, upon reading the Ministry of Health and auditor general's report, have physically visited some of the health facilities listed on the reports of having made insurance claims to confirm for themselves the existence of those facilities, only for their doubts to be confirmed as most of them don't exist at all in the said places.

They have called on the resignation of health cabinet secretary Aden Duale, accusing him of being complicit of the malfeasance. Duale has remained unswayed by the public uproar and has on various occasions affirmed that he will not resign, saying that it is his duty to fix the country's health sector and that he is focused on that.

== Government action ==
Over 30 hospitals have since been closed with tens others suspended and closed by the health ministry after being found guilty in the scandal. In October 2025, nine people including officials from SHA were arrested by DCI over alleged financial irregularities and unauthorised payments at the institution

There have since been arrests in different parts of the country on people involved in fake medical claims and forged medical documents. No conviction has been made on individuals charged in the scandal.

In August 2025, Kenya's president, William Ruto in a public address stated that SHA looters will face full wrath of the law. He also ordered hospitals involved in the scandal to issue refunds.

== See also ==
- NHIF Civil Servants Scheme Scandal
- Corruption in Kenya
