= Bhimji Depar Shah =

Kenyan businessman

- Born: 1931 (age 94–95); Mombassa, Kenya
- Occupations: Businessman, entrepreneur and industrialist
- Years active: 1970–present
- Organization: Bidco Group of Companies

Bhimji Depar Shah is a Kenyan businessman, industrialist and entrepreneur. He is the founder and chairman of Bidco Africa, a Kenya-based, family-owned manufacturing conglomerate with businesses in 13 African countries.

According to Forbes annual ranking of Africa's richest in Kenya Bhimji Depar Shah is the richest man in Kenya, and 31st richest man in Africa with a net worth of $700 million as of November 2015.

== Early life and education ==
He was born in Mombassa, Kenya in 1931.

== Career ==
=== Business ===
He settled in Nyeri, opening up a petrol station in the town. In 1970, he started Bidco Industries Limited, a garments manufacturing business. In 1985, the company switched to soap production. In 1991, Bidco opened up an edible oil manufacturing plant in Thika, and moved its International headquarters into the town, northeast of Nairobi, Kenya's capital. As of November 2014, the industrial conglomerate is a leading manufacturer of soaps, detergents, and baking powder, with annual gross revenue in excess of US$500 million. Bhimji's son Vimal Shah serves as the company's chief executive officer.

== See also ==
- Vimal Shah
- Economy of Kenya
