= Bidco Africa =

Kenyan consumer goods company

- Type: Private
- Industry: Consumer goods
- Founded: 1970
- Founder: Bhimji Depar Shah
- Headquarters: Thika, Kenya
- Area served: Africa
- Key people: Vimal Shah; Chairman; Tarun Shah; Director; Chris Diaz; Director
- Products: List: Oils and Fats Baking Products Detergents & Laundry Soaps Personal Care & Beauty Hygiene Animal Feeds
- Number of employees: 25,000 (February 2019)
- Website: bidcoafrica.com

Bidco Africa, previously Bidco Oil Refineries Limited (BORL), is a multinational consumer goods company headquartered in Thika, Kenya, with subsidiaries and distributorships across 17 countries in East Africa, Central Africa, and Southern Africa. Its products include edible oils, fats, margarine, laundry bars and detergents, personal care products, animal feeds and most recently, Food and Beverages. Bidco Africa owns over 40 brands and is the largest producer and marketer of consumer goods in the region.

== Overview ==
Bidco Africa has manufacturing factories in Kenya, Tanzania and Uganda with over 40 brands distributed across 17 African countries.

In April 2015, Bidco Africa announced plans to quadruple business volume before 2020, by building new manufacturing factories in Mozambique, Madagascar and Ethiopia in addition to existing operations in Kenya, Tanzania, Rwanda and Uganda. In February 2019 the BBC reported Bidco Africa's expansion into the food and beverage category as a move that positions the company to become the leading manufacturer of consumer goods in East Africa with a portfolio of over 40 brands and over 25,000 employees.

== Ownership ==
The stock of Bidco Africa is a wholly owned subsidiary of Hemby Holdings Limited, a privately held investment holding company of Bhimji Depar Shah and his family. The indirect shareholding in the group's stock was equally divided among Bhimji Depar Shah, Vimal Shah and Tarun Shah.

== History ==
Bidco Africa was founded in 1970 by Bhimji Depar Shah to manufacture garments. The company ventured into soap production in 1985 and launched edible oil manufacturing in 1991. In 1998, Bidco acquired the Elianto unit from Unga Group, a firm listed on the Nairobi Securities Exchange. This was the first acquisition by Bidco.

The group expanded regionally in 2001 when it launched into Tanzania through the creation of BIDCO Oil & Soap Ltd in Dar es Salaam. This marked the entry of Bidco into one of Africa's fastest growing markets.

In 2002, Bidco acquired Unilever’s brands in edible oil and soap business in Kenya. This bought brands such as Kimbo and Cowboy into its stable.

In 2005, the group expanded into Uganda with the official opening of the Bidco Uganda Limited Complex in Jinja. This plant has since been producing products for both the Uganda local market and the export markets.

The Company started producing personal care and beauty products in 2011, with the launch of “Pure and Natural Bar” soap.

In 2013, Bidco launched more personal care and beauty products, detergents and laundry soaps, with the launch of “Nuru premium multipurpose soaps, Power Boy Pro-Activ Liquid detergent, and Pure and Natural Activ Man.

In 2014, the Company launched more personal care and beauty soaps with the launch of Gaea – a family bath soap and Germonil – a personal hygiene product. During the same year, the company ventured into making animal feeds, building on its growing portfolio of products. The company installed a Sh500 million production line that has capacity to churn out 100 tonnes of animal feeds per day.

In 2016, the company announced a joint venture with a fortune 500 company – Land O’Lakes ltd, to form Bidco Land O’Lakes Ltd, a company that will initially produce animal feeds for the Kenyan market but eventually expand into other East African countries.

In 2017, Bidco Africa announced plans to commission four new plants as part of an ambitious diversification plan estimated at $200 million (Kshs 20.66 billion) over a period of five years. The expansion involved constructing an industrial park in Ruiru which includes a noodle factory, and a beverage plant.

In February 2019 the BBC reported Bidco Africa's expansion into the food and beverage category as a move that positions the company to become the leading manufacturer of consumer goods in East Africa with a portfolio of over 40 brands and over 25,000 employees.

== Products ==
Bidco Africa manufactures 40 brands across six product categories, namely: animal feeds, fats and edible oils, baking products, food and beverages, detergents and laundry soaps, hygiene, personal-care and beauty products. Some of Bidco's fastest-moving edible oil brands include Kimbo and Elianto.

== Competitive position ==
As of 2015, Bidco Africa was the leading fats and edible oils manufacturer in Kenya, controlling 24 percent of the market. Its closest competitors were Kapa Oil Refineries and Unilever which controlled 12 percent and 9 percent of the market respectively. In 2014, Bidco was estimated to control 60 percent of the market for cooking fat and 54 percent of that for cooking oil.

In April 2017, Vimal Shah announced Bidco Africa's growth strategy to diversify into manufacturing new product lines across Africa. In line with the company's vision, the move saw Vimal Shah take up the role of Executive Chairman heralding its transition from family-run operation into a professionally managed multinational.

In May 2019, a report published by the African Business Magazine ranked Bidco Africa as one of the top 5 most admired brands in Kenya. The report, unveiled by JSE Limited in partnership with Geopoll, Kantar, Brand Leadership and Brand Africa, surveyed over 250 million respondents in emerging markets around the globe to identify the most admired brands in Africa.

== Sustainable Agribusiness Initiatives ==
Bidco Africa has also partnered with Food and Agriculture Organisation (FAO) and African Women Entrepreneurship Programme (AWEP) who have 30,000 women in their supply chain, to offer them agri-business opportunities. This includes providing the farmers with the right seeds, fertiliser and the right type of agronomic practices and guaranteeing a market with a determined price for their produce. AWEP will organise 10,000 women to grow sunflower and soya beans.

A similar agreement with a local community-based organization – Vision 2030 Youth Entrepreneurship Programme – will ensure that its 10,000 members benefit from Bidco's agribusiness opportunities. Working in partnership with FAO, Bidco will facilitate Vision 2030 members in Laikipia and Tharaka Nithi counties grow oil seeds and supply to them in an off take agreement.

The company is also contracting farmers to grow and supply bamboo to power its factories in Thika and Ruiru. The firm, with presence in 16 countries, uses more than 200 tonnes of macadamia and coffee husks per month to generate power. The supply of macadamia and coffee husks is, however, erratic and unsustainable. The company estimates it will require 6,000 tonnes a month to meet its energy needs.

In March 2019 Bidco Africa partnered with Safaricom and the Makueni County Government to provide a ready market Sunflower farmers to be used as raw material in the processing of edible oils. Makueni is the first County in Kenya to pilot the end to end value chain from registration of farmers to accessing a ready market. Safaricom's DigiFarm Project will provide technical support through 34 DigiFarm depots where farmers can get inputs such as quality seeds and fertilizers. Through the partnership farmers will also have access to credit and insurance to help increase productivity.

== Sports sponsorship ==
Bidco Africa is a sponsor of Bidco United Football Club an association football club based in Kenya competing in the Kenyan National Super League, and Bul FC a Ugandan football club based in Jinja and plays in the Ugandan Super League.

In November 2017 Bidco Africa was unveiled as the official sponsor for the Kenya national rugby sevens team and the Kenya Lionesses Women's Rugby Sevens team. The three-year partnership facilitates the teams' participation in all the 2017/18 HSBC World Sevens Series tournaments, Commonwealth Games and 2018 Sevens World Cup. The deal includes the support of KRU's schools and club rugby development programs, as well as the diet and nutrition programs for both the men's and women's teams.

== Resolved Controversies ==
According to Friends of the Earth International, Bidco Uganda, a joint venture formed between Wilmar International, Josovina Commodities and Bidco Africa was involved in a dispute over land with local communities in Uganda. However, in September 2016, a High Court in Uganda cleared Bidco of any wrongdoing. In his ruling, Justice Kwesiga termed the lawsuit as unnecessary and said that the environmental groups could have searched for the truth by contacting the company.

According to an article in The Guardian in March 2015, Oil Palm Uganda Limited (OPUL) had in 2011 acquired land leases from a Ugandan businessman, Amos Ssempa, with the aim of expanding its plantations. In the article published by The Guardian, Mr. Ssempa reaffirmed his position that “due processes were followed and farmers were compensated”. Mr. Ssempa further said that “They [the farmers] signed that they received the money.” In July 2011 one of the residents, Nakamya, awoke to "find yellow machines churning up her land and razing the crops she had grown in a bid to make way for palm oil plantations." The community accused the company of grabbing their land and filed a lawsuit against the company and Amos Ssempa. The case was later dismissed by a Ugandan High Court. The September 2016 ruling by Justice Wilson Kwesiga cleared Bidco Uganda of any breaches of environmental degradation and land grabbing. In his ruling the judge termed the claims brought forward by the petitioners as "false". In February 2018, a mediation process by the dispute resolution office of the World Bank's International Finance Corporation resolved that the farmers would receive a lumpsum, which they would then allocate to each complainant based on a formula devised and agreed to by all parties.

=== BIDCO Cleared of Human Rights Violation Claims in Uganda ===
In February, 2016 The United Nations Development Programme (UNDP) received a petition from the Bugala Farmers Association in Uganda related to UNDP's association with Bidco Africa Ltd. A similar complaint was also received by the UNDP's Stakeholder Response Mechanism (SRM) and Social and Environmental Compliance Unit (SECU). In May, 2016, UNDP visited Kalangala to further investigate the issues surrounding the matter and tabled a report in November 2016 that faulted a decision inviting Bidco into partnership with the United Nations Development Programme's – Business Call to Action – in Uganda. The report further acknowledges that despite the errors made in the process, the observations in no way imply that Bidco had violated human rights, or is complicit in human rights violations. The mandate of the investigation and report was limited only to determinations related to UNDP's compliance with its own standards and procedures.

=== BIDCO Cleared of Poor Workplace Conditions and Inadequate Wage Claims in Kenya ===
In 2011 All Africa reported that approximately 3,000 workers went on strike citing poor working conditions, harassment by senior managers and inadequate wages. In March, 2015 approximately 400 workers went on strike citing similar issues. Following due process and the relevant dispute resolution channels Bidco Africa signed a collective bargaining agreement (CBA) with its workers, through their union – Kenya Chemical Workers Union. The June 2017 resolution saw unionisable workers receive a 19.5 percent increase in their pay bringing an end to the standoff.

In 2016 the Kenya National Assembly’s Labour and Social Welfare Committee began an investigation into Bidco Africa after receiving a petition by 12 individuals, presented to the National Assembly by Kiambu Town MP Jude Njomo on behalf of the group. In the petition, Bidco had been accused of poor working conditions, unfair dismissal of its workers and warning its employees against joining the Thika-based Kenya Union of Commercial Food and Allied Workers. In October 2016, the Bidco CEO – Vimal Shah, invited the parliamentary committee chaired by Jude Njomo, the MP for Kiambu Constituency to open an inquiry into the allegations, saying the company is a transparent and socially responsible corporate citizen with nothing to hide.

In December 2016 The Kenya National Assembly’s Labour and Social Welfare Committee met with former employees of Bidco Africa Limited who had complaints over what they term as "gross violation of labour laws" by their former employer. In response to the complaints raised, the Bidco management accused some of its former employees of having ulterior motives stating that it has a total of 1,700 employees, all of whom are on contract, contrary to allegations that the company's employees are employed on casual terms. In an article published in The Daily Nation, the company also refused to divulge details of how many of its employees are registered with the union but reiterated that all Bidco workers are free to join the Kenya Chemical Workers Union with whom they have a collective bargaining agreement and a recognition agreement in place. One of the directors, Mr. Dipak Shah, is on record saying that the company welcomes formal investigations into the allegations by the former employees insisting that Bidco has fully complied with existing labour as well as environmental laws and that all its procedures follow best practices and international standards. In a subsequent case filed by a section of the petitioners in an employment and labour relations court in Kenya, the court established that Bidco Africa did not breach section 49 of the Employment Act, 2007 when it terminated its former employees. In a judgment dated 13 October 2017, Judge Byram Ongaya ruled that the separation was by agreement and that there was no evidence of unfair termination.

In December 2017, Bidco was recognized for its commitment to keeping workers and workplace safe and healthy by the International Institute of Security and Safety Management (IISSM). Bidco Africa went on to be recognized as one of Kenya's best employers in the years 2018 and 2019.

=== BIDCO Cleared of Wrongdoing in the 2017 Presidential Election ===
In November 2017, following the announcement of the results of a boycotted repeat Presidential Election 2017, ordered by the Supreme Court of Kenya, Kenya's opposition coalition asked supporters to boycott Safaricom, Brookside Dairies, and Bidco Africa, stating they benefit from ties to the government of President Uhuru Kenyatta. On 25 July 2019 during his speech at the launch of the Bidco Industrial Park located in Ruiru, Kiambu County, Kenya's leader of the opposition coalition The Right Honorable Raila Odinga cleared Bidco Africa of any wrongdoing in the 2017 Presidential Election saying "I'm happy to be here your Excellency to witness the opening of this great project. Probably a confession is in order at this stage. Your excellency remember last year when we did the Handshake (March 9, 2018 Kenya Handshake), we said we start a journey to bring this country together. Before that our people had engaged in what we call 'Resist Movement' and as they say when two elephants are fighting it is the grass that suffers. Bidco was one of those companies that was on the list of resist. But when we came together we lifted the ban and told our people to continue buying the products manufactured by those companies (Bidco). Vimal (Vimal Shah) and I have been friends for a long time; and the old man(Bhimji Depar Shah) is also a friend of our family."

== Matters Pending Resolution ==
=== Claims of Tax Impropriety ===
Despite having a track record as a distinguished taxpayer, Bidco Africa has also been the subject of claims of tax impropriety. In a case filed at the Kenyan High Court in 2012, Bidco Africa sued the Kenya Revenue Authority, for using the sum insured of an import consignment as the dutiable amount. The company filed a petition contesting its right to be charged KSh1.3 billion in taxes by the Kenya Revenue Authority. In August 2013 a High Court Judge ruled there had been no violation of the company's rights under Articles 47(1) and 48 of the Constitution of Kenya and dismissed the petition challenging the amount.

The sum of KSh 1.3 billion was calculated from Bidco Africa's undervaluation of value added tax and duty payable on the contract due to tariff misclassification and undervaluation of goods. In November 2016 the Ombudsman, the Commission on Administrative Justice received a complaint against Kenya Revenue Authority for allegedly delaying to collect tax arrears from Bidco Africa as per the 2012 High Court order. The Ombudsman said the delay in recovering the taxes owed, since the initial demand in September 2009, has been compounded by an "abuse of the judicial process by Bidco". Contrary to these allegations the article, published in The Star, further reveals that following the dismissal of their petition, Bidco sought temporary stay orders pending an appeal, which was granted. Bidco Africa has a valid tax compliance certificate issued by Kenya Revenue Authority and the matter is now pending before the Tax Appeals Tribunal following the successful appeal.

== Smear Campaign Against Bidco Africa and Vimal Shah ==
In 2007, a representative of Renaissance Capital approached Vimal Shah to solicit for the contract to handle Bidco Africa's initial public offering. Vimal's refusal and the subsequent fallout in the related Tatu City Project resulted in a protracted smear campaign against Vimal Shah and Bidco Africa.

According to an article published on Money and Markets in October 2019, the deliberate smear campaign, which began in 2015, was orchestrated by a Kenyan Public Relations company and a corporate communications expert from Cornell University, to paint Vimal Shah as "the untouchable, tax-evading, sadistic enemy of the people".

== See also ==
- Bhimji Depar Shah
- Vimal Shah
