= Kenya Deposit Insurance Corporation =

Kenyan deposit insurer

Coordinates: 01°17′21″S 36°49′30″E

Kenya Deposit Insurance Corporation (KDIC)
Agency overview
- Formed: 2012
- Jurisdiction: Government of Kenya
- Headquarters: UAP Old Mutual Towers; Upper Hill, Nairobi; Kenya
- Employees: 50 (2020)
- Agency executive: Mrs. Hellen Chepchumba Chepkwony, Chief Executive Officer
- Parent agency: Central Bank of Kenya
- Website: www.kdic.go.ke

The Kenya Deposit Insurance Corporation is a statutory institution established under the Kenya Deposit Insurance Act, 2012 (KDI Act, 2012). The Corporation is mandated to provide a deposit insurance scheme for customers of member institutions, to provide incentives for sound risk management and generally promote the stability of the financial system and prompt resolution.

== History ==
The Corporation was an integral part of the Central Bank of Kenya (CBK), the country's bank regulator, prior to its establishment and enhancement of KDIC's mandate in 2012. The law also established the Deposit Insurance Fund (the Fund), replacing the Deposit Protection Fund. KDIC is mandated by law to administer the Fund by collecting contributions from member institutions and holding, managing, and applying the Fund.

KDIC is also mandated to receive, liquidate, and wind up institutions for which it is the designated receiver or liquidator, a function previously overseen by the Central Bank of Kenya. The KDI Act, 2012, mandates the Central Bank of Kenya, to appoint KDIC as the sole and exclusive receiver of a member institution when (a) the institution's obligations to creditors exceed its assets (b) deliberately violates a regulatory or supervisory order (c) fails to provide necessary access to inspectors or lacks general transparency (d) is unable to meet any of its financial obligations, either now or in the near future (e) engages in activities that violate any of the country's laws.

In 2014, the law was amended and KDIC separated from the Central Bank. KDIC collects a flat rate fee of 0.15 percent of all deposits from each member institution, adjustable at the discretion of KDIC. It also collects an additional fee based on the risk-adjusted percentage of their total deposit liabilities during the previous twelve months as calculated by KDIC.

== Staffing ==
KDIC is in the process of populating its entire staff structure that currently stands at 68 employees. The Corporation hopes to have attained a staff complement of 160 by 2025.

== Recent interventions ==
In June 2016, CBK mandated KDIC to intervene, when member financial institutions fell foul of Kenya's banking laws and regulations, during the previous twelve months.

- In August 2015, Dubai Bank Kenya, was placed under receivership by the CBK, on account of “serious cash-flow problems”. KDIC was called in to refund customer deposits. KDIC has recommended liquidation of the bank.
- In October 2015, Imperial Bank Kenya failed due to “unsafe and unsound business conditions to transact business” that existed in the bank. KDIC was instructed to intervene by CBK. In June 2016, CBK agreed with NIC Bank to take over the 28 branches and all 470 former employees of Imperial Bank once the outstanding litigation is resolved.
- In April 2016, Chase Bank Kenya failed and was placed under receivership by the Central Bank of Kenya, prompting KDIC to step in. Three weeks later, KCB Bank Kenya Limited was appointed receiver-manager of Chase, with all branches re-opening on 27 April 2015, under KCB oversight.

== Location ==
KDIC's headquarters are located at Old Mutual Tower, Upper Hill, Nairobi.

== See also ==
- Economy of Kenya
