= Commercial Bank of Africa Group =

Financial services provider in East Africa

- Type: Private
- Industry: Banking, Finance
- Founded: 1962
- Defunct: September 30, 2019
- Fate: Acquired by NIC Bank Group
- Headquarters: Upper Hill, Nairobi, Kenya
- Key people: Desterio Oyatsi; Group Chairman; Isaac Awuondo; Group CEO
- Products: Banks
- Revenue: ▲: Aftertax: KSh 4.1 billion (Q3:2017)
- Total assets: KSh 234.79 billion (Q3:2017)
- Number of employees: 1,200+ (2017)
- Website: www.cbagroup.com

Commercial Bank of Africa Group (CBA Group) is a financial services provider in East Africa. Its headquarters are located in Nairobi, Kenya, with subsidiaries in Kenya, Rwanda, Tanzania, Uganda and Ivory Coast.

The CBA Group is a large financial services group in East Africa, with an asset base valued at KSh:234.79 billion (US$2.343 billion), with shareholders' equity of KSh:28.38 billion (US$283.2 million), as of 30 September 2017.

== History ==
Commercial Bank of Africa was established in 1962 in Dar es Salaam, Tanzania as a subsidiary of Swiss-based Société Financière pour les Pays d'Outre-Mer (SFOM). The SFOM consortium included Banque Nationale de Paris, Bank Bruxelles Lambert, Commerz Bank and Bank of America. Branches of the bank were established in Nairobi and Mombasa, Kenya. Another branch was opened in Kampala, Uganda.

In 1967, the Government of Tanzania nationalized all commercial banks in the country as part of the government's nationalization of large industries in its execution of the Arusha Declaration. This nationalization led the bank to move its headquarters to Nairobi. In 1971, the Ugandan business was sold off to Barclays Bank of Uganda. This was due to the then prevailing political instability in the country.

BOA gained majority control of CBA in 1981 after BOA acquired shares held by other shareholders in the bank except for 16% that was held by local shareholders. Between 1984 and 1991, BOA re-organised CBA, developing and installing Bank of America's global systems and disciplines before selling its majority shares to local Kenyan investors. Bank of America continued to provide management to the bank via a management agreement before eventually selling the rest of its shares in 1991. Since then, CBA became a wholly owned Kenyan bank recognised for operational efficiency and quality service delivery.

In July 2005, Commercial Bank of Africa (CBA) acquired majority shareholding in First American Bank of Kenya. At that time First American owned a subsidiary in Tanzania called United Bank of Africa. This marked the bank's reentry into Tanzania after the 1967 nationalization of its operations in the country. In 2007, United Bank of Africa changed its name to Commercial Bank of Africa (Tanzania) leading to the formation of the CBA Group.

In March 2012, CBA Group initiated action to acquire a 62% stake in Royal Bank Zimbabwe, a Harare-based commercial bank. However, both parties failed to finalize on the deal within given regulatory time frames. On July 31, 2012, The Reserve Bank of Zimbabwe determined Royal Bank to be insolvent. Royal Bank then surrendered its banking licence and closed down.

CBA Group re-entered the Ugandan market in 2014 through its wholly owned subsidiary, Commercial Bank of Africa Uganda Limited making it the 26th commercial bank in the Uganda.

In 2016, Commercial Bank of Africa Group announced plans to establish its mobile banking service M-Shwari in Ivory Coast in collaboration with the telecommunications conglomerate, MTN International. In December 2016, the CBA Group acquired a Rwandan Microfinance banking licence, thereby establishing Commercial Bank of Africa (Rwanda), also CBA Bank Rwanda. In mid-2017, negotiations for CBA Bank Rwanda to acquire Crane Bank Rwanda were concluded, but required regulatory approval from the National Bank of Rwanda, the Central Bank of Kenya and the Bank of Uganda. Crane Bank in Uganda had failed and its assets and liabilities in Uganda had been acquired by DFCU Bank. However, DFCU did not want to keep the Rwandan subsidiary. The deal was concluded during the first quarter of 2018 and CBA Bank Rwanda opened with three branches in Kigali.

== Merger with NIC Group Plc ==
In December 2018, CBA Group announced that it would be merging with NIC Group Plc creating Kenya's third-biggest bank. The merger involved the transfer of 100 percent of the shares of CBA Group by its shareholders to NIC Group in exchange for 53 percent of the newly formed group, making the deal a reverse merger. The Transaction was approved by the Kenyan regulators and shareholders by April 2019. As of 18 May 2019, the merged group was still operating two sets of banks in Kenya, Uganda and Tanzania but was in the process of seeking regulatory approval to merge these businesses so that they can have one bank in each country and a group rebranding.

== Member Companies ==
The companies that compose the CBA Group include:

- Commercial Bank of Africa (Kenya): Nairobi, Kenya – 100% shareholding - A commercial bank in Kenya, serving individuals and businesses. This is the flagship company of the group.
- Commercial Bank of Africa (Tanzania): Dar es Salaam, Tanzania – 100% shareholding - A commercial bank in Tanzania, serving both individuals and businesses.
- Commercial Bank of Africa (Uganda): Kampala, Uganda: 100% shareholding - A commercial bank in Uganda, serving both individuals and businesses.
- Commercial Bank of Africa (Rwanda): Kigali, Rwanda
- CBA Insurance Agency Limited: Nairobi, Kenya – 100% shareholding - Offering Bancassurance services. CBA Group owns 100% of the company.
- CBA Capital Limited – Nairobi, Kenya – 100% shareholding - An investment bank licensed by the Capital Markets Authority. CBA Group owns 100% of the company.
- CBA Property Holdings Limited – Nairobi, Kenya – 100% shareholding - Property Holding company
- AIG Kenya Insurance Company Limited – Nairobi, Kenya – 33.33% shareholding the balance held by the American International Group. - Offering general insurance.
- CBA Ivory Coast - Abidjan, Ivory Coast - CBA Group, in collaboration with MTN Group, offers M-Shwari mobile-money service in Ivory Coast.

== Ownership ==
The stock of Commercial Bank of Africa Group is privately held. The Kenyatta family controls 24.91 percent of CBA through an investment vehicle called Enke Investments Limited. The table below illustrates the shareholding in the company stock, as of December 2017.

Commercial Bank of Africa Group Stock Ownership
Rank	Name of Owner	Percentage Ownership
1	Enke Investments Limited	24.91
2	Ropat Nominees Limited	22.50
3	Livingstone Registrars Limited	19.90
4	Yana Investments Limited	11.14
5	Ropat Trust Company Limited	5.37
6	Other Institutions & Individuals	16.18
	Total	100.00

== See also ==
- Commercial Bank of Africa
- CBA Group
- Commercial Bank of Africa (Tanzania)
- Commercial Bank of Africa (Uganda)
- Commercial Bank of Africa (Rwanda)
- Economy of Kenya
- East African Community
