= Commercial Bank of Africa (Tanzania) =

Commercial bank in Tanzania

- Type: Subsidiary
- Industry: Banking
- Founded: 1962; 64 years ago
- Headquarters: Amani Place, Ohio Street, Dar es Salaam, Tanzania
- Key people: Muhoho Kenyatta; Chairman; Gift Shoko; Managing Director & CEO
- Products: Loans, Savings, Transaction accounts, Investments, Debit Cards, Credit Cards, Mortgages
- Revenue: ▼Aftertax:TZS:23.236 billion (US$10.234+ million) (2015)
- Total assets: TZS:462.2 billion (US$204 million) (2015)
- Number of employees: 160 (2018); 181 (2017)
- Parent: Commercial Bank of Africa Group
- Website: Bank website

Commercial Bank of Africa (Tanzania) (CBAT) is a commercial bank in Tanzania. It is licensed by the Bank of Tanzania, the country's central bank and national banking regulator. The bank is a subsidiary of the Commercial Bank of Africa Group and has its headquarters in Nairobi, Kenya.

== Location ==
The headquarters and main branch of CBA Tanzania Limited are located at Amani Place, along Ohio Street, in Dar es Salaam, Tanzania's largest city and financial capital. The geographical coordinates of the bank's headquarters are: 06°48'42.0"S, 39°17'15.0"E (Latitude:-6.811667; Longitude:39.287500).

== Overview ==
CBAT serves the banking needs of individuals and businesses in Tanzania. The bank focuses on meeting the banking needs of large corporations, diplomatic missions, non-governmental organizations, and high-end private clients. As of December 2015, the bank's total assets were valued at TZS:462.2 billion (approximately US$204 million), with shareholders equity of TZS:43 billion (US$19 million).

== History ==
The bank was founded in 1962 in Dar es Salaam. Branches were soon opened in Nairobi and Mombasa, Kenya and in Kampala, Uganda. When Tanzania nationalized private banks in 1967, the bank moved its headquarters to Nairobi. Following political changes in Uganda in 1971, the bank sold its assets in that country. In July 2005, the Commercial Bank of Africa (CBA) acquired majority shareholding in First American Bank of Kenya, which at the time had a Tanzanian subsidiary called United Bank of Africa. In 2007, United Bank of Africa rebranded to Commercial Bank of Africa (Tanzania), returning the brand to the country since 1967. In January 2014, CBA opened its first branch in Uganda.

== Branch network ==
As of May 2018, CBAT maintained branches at the following locations:

1. Ohio Street Branch: Amani Place, Ohio Street, Dar es Salaam Main Branch
2. Kariakoo Branch: Tropical Hotel, Narung'ombe Street, Dar es Salaam
3. Kijitonyama Branch: Tanzania Telecommunications Company Limited Building, Plot no 717, Block number 6, Kijitonyama, Dar es Salaam
4. Samora Branch: PPF House, Corner of Samora Machel Avenue & Morogoro Road, Dar es Salaam
5. Nyerere Branch: Jamana House, Julius K. Nyerere Road, Dar es Salaam
6. Mtwara Branch: Tanu Road, Mtwara
7. Moshi Branch: Tanzania Telecommunications Company Limited Building, Moshi
8. Arusha Branch: TFA Building, Fire Road, Arusha
9. Mbeya Branch: 41 Soweto Area, Block ‘O, Mbeya
10. Tunduma Branch: Tanzania Telecommunications Company Limited Building, Plot no 56/2, Block I, Tunduma, Mbeya
11. Mwanza Branch: Kenyatta Road, Mwanza.

== See also ==
- CBA Group
- Bank of Tanzania
- Economy of Tanzania
- List of banks in Tanzania
