= Airtel Kenya =

Kenyan telecommunications services provider

Airtel Kenya Ltd.
- Type: Subsidiary
- Industry: Telecommunications
- Area served: Kenya
- Products: Mobile telephony Broadband; Internet services
- Parent: Airtel Africa
- Website: www.airtelkenya.com

Airtel Kenya Ltd., a subsidiary of Airtel Africa (owned by Bharti Airtel), is the second largest telecommunications services provider in Kenya after Safaricom PLC. It has a customer base of over 21 million subscribers of the total 68.9 million subscribers in the Kenyan market equivalent to 30.4% market share. Airtel market share has been rising steadily over the last few years.

Airtel Kenya previously operated as Kencell, Celtel, and Zain before rebranding to Airtel in November 2010.

As of 2024 its CEO is Ashish Malhotra.

== History ==
In 2010, Bharti Airtel acquired Zain Africa's business for $10.7 billion. The acquisition deal covered Zain operations in 15 countries including Kenya but excluding Sudan and Morocco. The deal increased Bharti Airtel's overall customer base to 180 million subscribers, including the 131 million subscribers it had in India in April 2010.

In the acquisition deal, Zain received $7.9 billion in cash, with Bharti Airtel assuming $1.7 billion of consolidated debt obligations.

In 2018, it was announced that Airtel Kenya was considering a merger with Telkom Kenya. Airtel Kenya backed out of the talks in June 2018.
