= Mwalimu Cooperative Savings and Credit Society Limited =

Mwalimu Cooperative Savings & Credit Society Limited
- Company type: Private
- Industry: Financial services
- Founded: 1974
- Headquarters: Nairobi, Kenya
- Key people: Wellington Otiende; Chairman; Alphonse Kaio; Chief Executive Officer
- Products: Loans, Checking, Savings, Investments, Debit Cards
- Total assets: US$444.8+ million (KES:46.2 billion) (2018)
- Website: Homepage

Mwalimu Cooperative Savings and Credit Society Limited, also known as Mwalimu National Sacco Limited, but often referred to as Mwalimu Sacco, is a savings and credit co-operative society (Sacco) in Kenya, the largest economy in the East African Community. It is an institutional Sacco, composed of the staff of the Teachers Service Commission (TSC), TSC teachers in secondary and tertiary institutions, TSC teachers in elementary schools, the staff of Mwalimu National Sacco Limited and the spouses of the above members, when formally gainfully employed. The society is licensed and regulated by the Sacco Societies Regulatory Authority.

== Overview ==
Mwalimu Sacco is a medium-tier financial services provider in Kenya. As of December 2013, it was the largest Savings and Cooperative Society (Sacco) in the country, with an asset base valued at about US$282.2 million (KES:24.5 billion). At that time, the society had in excess of 57,520 members and a loan book of approximately US$241.5 million (KES:20.96 billion). If Mwalimu Sacco were a commercial bank, it would rank number 23, by assets, out of the 43 licensed commercial banks in Kenya, just below Guaranty Trust Bank (East Africa). As at December 2013, Mwalimu Sacco was ranked as the number one SACCO in Kenya, as measured by assets and revenue

== History ==
The society was established in 1974, with the objective of mobilizing savings from its members and providing loans to members, using those resources. In 2013, Joshua Ojall, the society CEO at the time, announced plans to build up to 100 housing units in the outskirts of Nairobi, the capital and largest city in Kenya and East Africa. The houses and apartments constructed using a US$5.2 million (KSh450 million) fund will be sold to Society members at between KSh2.8 million and KSh4.5 million (US$33,000 - US$52,000). The program is expected to roll out in other Kenyan urban centers after the Nairobi opening. In 2014, the Chairman of the Society announced plans to open a commercial bank, known as Spire Bank, between 2014 and 2018.

== Ownership ==
The shares of stock of Mwalimu National Sacco Limited are privately owned. The detailed shareholding in the Cooperative society is not widely, publicly known.

== Subsidiaries ==
In December 2014, Mwalimu Sacco acquired 51% shareholding in Equatorial Commercial Bank (ECB), a Kenyan retail commercial bank, for a cash payment of KES:1.7 billion (approximately USD:18 million). The sales agreement provided for the Sacco to purchase another 24% shareholding in the bank before 31 December 2015, to enable ECB comply with Central Bank of Kenya shareholding directives. The Sacco will then turn around and sell some of its shareholding in the bank, to some of its members. Following the resolution of objections raised by the Cooperative Alliance of Kenya, a commission set up to investigate the deal, gave its approval in March 2015.

== Branches ==
As of December 2013, the society maintains a network of branches at the following locations:

1. Tom Mboya Branch - Mwalimu Cooperative House, Tom Mboya Street, Nairobi (Main Branch)
2. TSC Branch - Teacher Service Commission Centre, Upper Hill, Nairobi
3. Kisumu Branch - Kenya Reinsurance Plaza, Oginga Odinga Street, Kisumu
4. Nyeri Branch - Kanisa Road, Nyeri
5. Kisii Branch - Ouru Complex, Kisii
6. Webuye Branch - Afro Fancy House, Webuye
7. Mombasa Branch - Arrow Plaza, Mombasa
8. Kitui Branch - Winlo Complex, Kilungya Street, Kitui
9. Meru Branch - Stemuki Plaza, Kirukiri Street, Meru
10. Eldoret Branch - Zion Mall, Uganda Road, Eldoret
11. Nakuru Branch - Vickers House, Kenyatta Avenue, Nakuru

== See also ==
- Imarisha Cooperative Savings and Credit Society Limited
- Unaitas Sacco
- Kenya Banks
- Kenya Economy
