= Sameer Group =

Kenyan conglomerate

- Company type: Private
- Industry: Finance, construction, manufacturing, logistics, distribution
- Headquarters: Nairobi, Kenya
- Key people: Naushad Merali, Group Executive Chairman
- Products: Banks, dairy products, tires, software, transportation
- Website: Homepage

The Sameer Group of Companies, commonly referred to as the Sameer Group, is a large conglomerate, based in Kenya, with operations and subsidiaries in neighboring African countries.

== Overview ==
The group is involved in industries including: agriculture, manufacturing, distribution, high-tech, construction, transport and finance. The company's offices are located in Nairobi, the capital city of Kenya, and the largest metropolitan area in that country. Some of the group's subsidiaries have their shares publicly listed on the Nairobi Stock Exchange.

== Subsidiary companies ==
As of May 2014, the Sameer Group subsidiaries include, but are not limited to the following companies:

- Sasini Tea & Coffee, Nairobi, Kenya
- Sameer Agriculture & Livestock Limited, Kampala, Uganda - Dairy Processing (Sold to Brookside Dairies in May 2015).
- Sameer Industrial Park Limited, Nairobi, Kenya
- Sameer Business Park Limited, Nairobi, Kenya
- Sameer Africa Limited, Nairobi, Kenya - Manufacture of tires. Formerly "Firestone East Africa Limited
- Ryce East Africa Limited, Nairobi, Kenya
- Yansam Motors Limited, Nairobi, Kenya
- Swift Global Kenya Limited, Nairobi, Kenya
- Kenya Data Networks Limited, Nairobi, Kenya - Information Technology Company
- Infocom Limited, Kampala, Uganda - Internet Service Provider
- Eveready East Africa Limited, Nairobi, Kenya - Manufacture of batteries
- Ryce East Africa - Engineering Division, Nairobi, Kenya
- Equatorial Commercial Bank, Nairobi, Kenya
- Equatorial Investment Bank Limited, Nairobi, Kenya
- Savanna Coffee Lounge, Nairobi, Kenya
- VLCC East Africa, a joint venture with VLCC of India, specialized in healthcare, fitness and wellness.

== See also ==
- Economy of Kenya
- List of conglomerates in Africa
