= Social Health Authority (Kenya) =

Kenyan government healthcare provider

- SHA
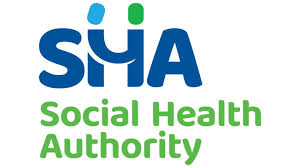

Government agency overview
- Formed: 22 November 2023
- Preceding Government agency: National Health Insurance Fund
- Jurisdiction: Kenya
- Government agency executives: Dr. Mohammed Abdi Mohammed, Chairman of the Board of Directors; Robert Ingasira, Chief Executive Officer (Acting)
- Website: https://sha.go.ke/

The Social Health Authority (SHA) is a State Corporation of the Government of Kenya that is responsible for the provision and management of public health insurance within the Republic of Kenya. The core business and mandate of the SHA is to provide accessible, affordable, sustainable and quality health insurance for all Kenyan citizens, and foreigners, where applicable. The SHA replaced the previous National Health Insurance Fund (NHIF) through an Act of Parliament, the Social Health Insurance Act, on 22 November 2023 and began operations on 1 October 2024.

== History ==
The previous National Hospital Insurance Fund (NHIF) was established in 1966 as a department within the Ministry of Health through the National Health Insurance Act, and remained Kenya's primary authority for management of public health insurance until its abolishment in 2023.

The Social Health Insurance Act was enacted on 22 November 2023 with a view to streamlining public health insurance in Kenya. As part of this intention, public health insurance was subdivided into three separate insurance schemes: the Primary Healthcare Fund, the Social Health Insurance Fund and the Emergency, Chronic and Critical Illness Fund, in addition to the NHIF being abolished together with its parent Act and replaced with the SHA, which would be responsible for managing the three schemes alongside its other responsibilities.

== Health Management Information System ==
On 29 June 2026 after holding a forum with healthcare provider associations, the Cabinet Secretary for Health Aden Duale ordered all public and contracted healthcare facilities to transfer to a new connected digital Health Management Information System (HMIS). HMIS is a digital platform designed to capture, manage, exchange and use health information generated within the healthcare system. Emmanuel Rono of the People Daily described it as creating a digital link between what happens at a hospital and the information required to manage healthcare services and financing. Previously, health facilities would use a SHA provider portal, which included: manual processes with digital patient verification, and claims submissions being made electronically. HMIS is intended to prevent delayed reimbursements, weak verifications and fraud. It also allows real-time patient verification, electronic claims processing and secure provider authentication. Duale called the transfer an important reform that would bring "efficiency, transparency and accountability across the health sector by integrating healthcare service delivery with health financing on a secure digital platform."

== See also ==
- Social Health Authority Scandal
