= Equity Bank =

Equity Bank may refer to:

- Equity Bank Group, now known as Equity Group Holdings, an African financial services company
  - Equity Bank Congo, now known as Equity Banque Commerciale du Congo
  - Equity Bank Kenya Limited
  - Equity Bank Rwanda Limited
  - Equity Bank South Sudan Limited
  - Equity Bank Tanzania Limited
  - Equity Bank Uganda Limited
- Equity Bank (United States), based in the American state of Kansas
