= Kangema =

- Location within Kenya
- Coordinates: 0.6856°S 36.9650°E
- Country: Kenya
- County: Muranga County
- Town council: 1988
- Time zone: UTC+3 (EAT)

Kangema is a settlement in Muranga County, Kenya. It is the birthplace of James Mwangi, the Group Managing Director and Group Chief Executive Officer of the Equity Group Holdings Limited, the banking conglomerate with the largest customer base on the African continent, in excess of 8 million as of 2014.

== Location ==
Kangema is located approximately 100 kilometres (62 mi), by road, north of Nairobi, the capital of Kenya, and the largest city in that East African country. The coordinates of Kangema are:0°41'08.0"S, 36°57'54.0"E (Latitude:-0.685556; Latitude:36.965000).

== Points of interest ==
Equity Bank Kenya maintains a branch in Kangema, so does Kenya Commercial Bank and Family Bank. In Kenya's colonial history, Kangema is famed for the colonial District Commissioner (DC) called Whitney Whittaker (Waitina) who cut the tails of indigenous dogs and castrated Kikuyu men in his jurisdiction.

== See also ==
- Wealthy Kenyans
- Aberdare Range
- Mwangi
