= Equity Bank Tanzania Limited =

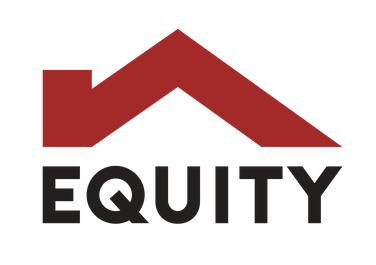
- Type: Private
- Industry: Financial services
- Founded: 2012
- Headquarters: Golden Jubilee Towers, Ohio Street Dar es Salaam, Tanzania
- Number of locations: 14 branches (2020)
- Area served: Tanzania
- Key people: Raymond Mbilinyi - Non-Executive Chairman; Robert Kiboti - Managing Director
- Products: Loans, Checking; Savings; Investments; Debit Cards; Diaspora Banking
- Revenue: US$19.1 million (2020)
- Total assets: US$259.1 million (2020)
- Owner: Equity Group Holdings
- Number of employees: 399 (Q4:2019)
- Parent: Equity Group Holdings Limited
- Website: tz.equitybankgroup.com

Equity Bank Tanzania Limited, is a commercial bank in Tanzania, the second-largest economy in the East African Community. It is licensed by the Bank of Tanzania, the country's central bank and national banking regulator. The bank is a member of the Equity Group Holdings Limited, a large financial services conglomerate, headquartered in Nairobi, Kenya, with subsidiaries in Kenya, Rwanda, South Sudan, Tanzania, Uganda, Democratic Republic of the Congo and a representative office in Ethiopia.

== Overview ==
As of September 2014, Equity Bank Tanzania Limited owned total assets valued at US$143.42 million, with US$107.68 million in customer deposits and a loan book of US$87.1 million. As at 31 June 2016, his bank was the leading originator of mortgage loans in Tanzania, accounting for an estimated TSh 96 billion (approx. US$45 million) in total mortgage loans. At that time, this translated in about 20 percent market share of all mortgage loans in the country.

In 2019, Equity Group Holdings Limited began talks to acquire four banks in Tanzania, Rwanda, Zambia and Mozambique from Atlas Mara in a share deal valued at KSh 10.6 billion (US$965 million) where the company had recorded a pre-tax loss of KSh 559 million (US$5.09 million). The transaction deal was dropped so that Equity Group Holdings Limited could stock their reserves and have cash flow during the COVID-19 pandemic that was being reported worldwide.

By December 2020, Equity Bank Tanzania Limited recorded a total value of $162 million (KSh 17.8 billion) in customer deposits, a loan book worth $138 million( KSh 15.2 million) and asset value worth $259 million (KSh 28.5 billion).

== Equity Group Holdings Limited ==
Equity Group Holdings Limited is a large financial services group in East Africa. As of March 2014, As of August 2021, the group had an asset base valued at over US$10.2 billion (KSh 1.12 trillion), with a total customer base in excess of 14 million. The companies that comprise the Equity Bank Group include the following:

1. Equity Bank Kenya Limited – Nairobi, Kenya
2. Equity Bank Rwanda Limited – Kigali, Rwanda
3. Equity Bank South Sudan Limited – Juba, South Sudan
4. Equity Bank Tanzania Limited – Dar es Salaam, Tanzania
5. Equity Bank Uganda Limited – Kampala, Uganda
6. Equity Banque Commerciale du Congo – Kinshasa, Democratic Republic of the Congo
7. Equity Consulting Group Limited – Nairobi, Kenya
8. Equity Insurance Agency Limited – Nairobi, Kenya
9. Equity Nominees Limited – Nairobi, Kenya
10. Equity Investment Services Limited – Nairobi, Kenya
11. Finserve Africa Limited – Nairobi, Kenya
12. Equity Group Foundation – Nairobi, Kenya

Shares of the stock of Equity Group Holdings Limited, are listed on the Nairobi Stock Exchange (NSE), under the symbol EQTY. The Group's stock is also cross-listed on the Uganda Securities Exchange (USE), under the symbol EBL.

== See also ==
- Tanzania Banks
- Africa Banks
- Equity Group Holdings
- Bank of Tanzania
- Tanzania Economy
