= Janani Luwum Church House =

Commercial building in Kampala, Uganda

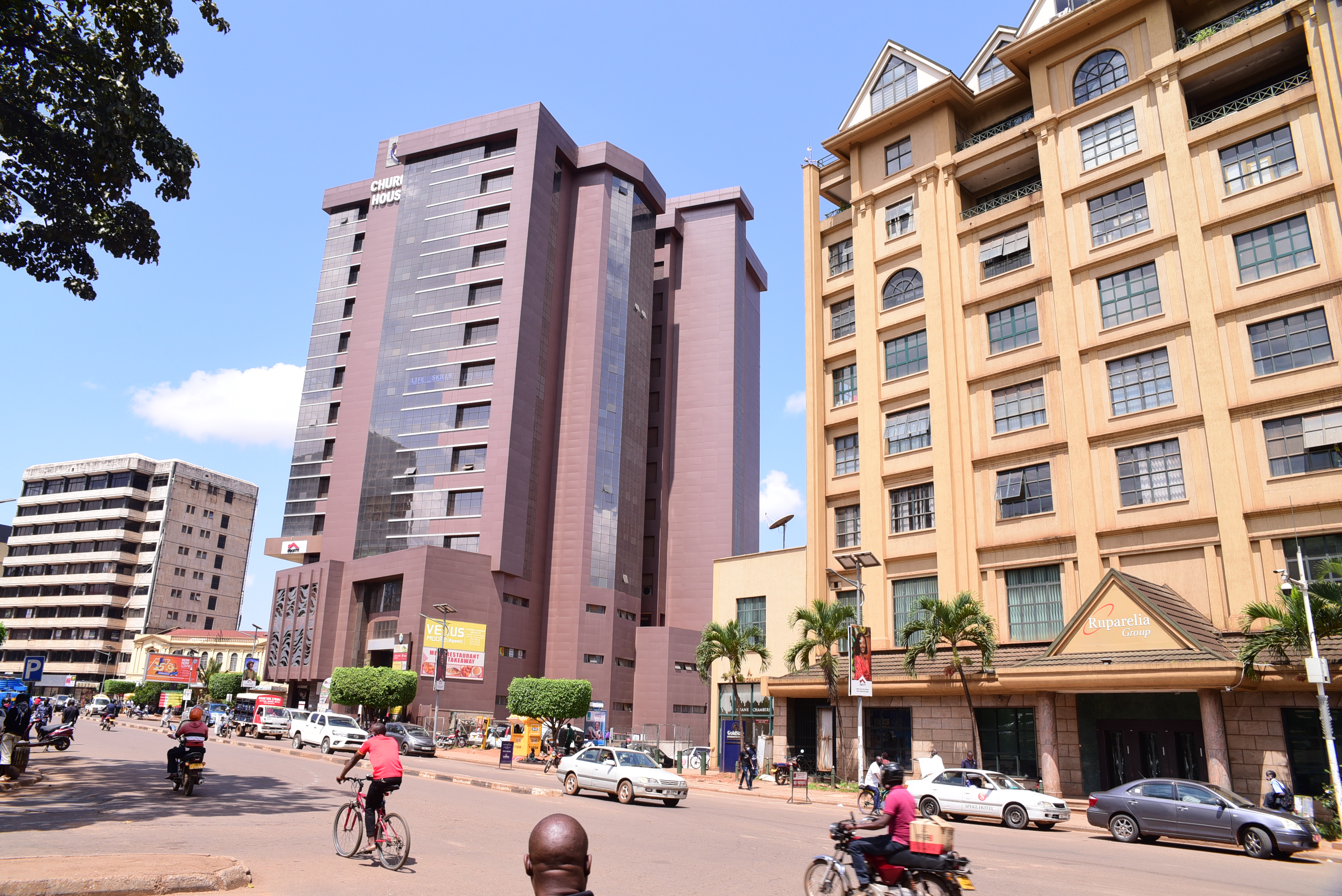

- Location within Kampala

General information
- Type: Commercial
- Location: 34 Kampala Road; Kampala, Uganda
- Coordinates: 00°18′49″N 32°34′46″E
- Construction started: January 2011
- Completed: June 2018
- Cost: US$24.3 million

Technical details
- Floor count: 16

Janani Luwum Church House, or simply Church House, is a commercial building in Kampala, the capital of Uganda. The building is owned by the Anglican Church in Uganda, known as the Church of Uganda.

== Location ==
The skyscraper is located at 34 Kampala Road, the main business street in Kampala. This location lies within Kampala Central Division, in the central business district of Uganda's capital city (2020 est. pop: 1,680,600). The coordinates of Church House are:0°18'49.0"N, 32°34'46.0"E (Latitude=0.313625; Longitude:32.579449).

== Overview ==
Church House is owned by the Provincial Office of the Church of Uganda. Shares in the holding company, Church of Uganda House Limited, were purchased by Anglican dioceses and parishes in the country. The building houses the offices of the Archbishop of Uganda. The remaining space is rented to banks, restaurants and other commercial interests, in order to raise funds to pay the construction mortgage. After the mortgage was retired in 2024, the income funds other church projects.

Equity Bank Uganda Limited, the bank that held the 70 percent equity mortgage on the building, maintains its headquarters and main branch, on the first four floors of the skyscraper.

== History ==
The idea to construct a building of this nature was conceived in 1965, with the aim of enabling the Church of Uganda to financially sustain itself. However, earlier attempts to fundraise did not meet the set targets. The Church took those funds and bought land in different parts of the city. By selling those real estate holdings in the 2000s, the provincial office was able to raise the required 30 percent of the construction costs. They also secured a 70 percent mortgage from Equity Bank Uganda Limited to complete the construction. Construction of the premises finally started in January 2011 with an initial timeline of 18 to 24 months. However, due to unforeseen delays, completion of the project was temporarily slated for the second half of 2014. Construction was finally concluded and the completed building was handed over to the owners in June 2018. The completed building was officially commissioned by Ruhakana Rugunda, the prime minister of Uganda at that time, on Friday, 24 August 2018.

== Construction costs ==
The lead contractor on this project was Cementers Uganda Limited, a local construction company. The initial estimate was for UGX:40.73 billion (US$16.3 million at that time). Construction delays may have pushed those figures higher. Construction began in 2011, with an initial timeline of 18 months. As of June 2014, the building was not yet complete. The Church of Uganda contributed 30 percent in cash and Equity Bank provided a 70 percent construction mortgage. James Mwangi, the Group CEO of Equity Group Holdings Limited, personally contributed USh1 billion (approx. US$270,000) towards the construction of this building.

In June 2024, the Church of Uganda paid off in full, the 14-year construction loan of US$17 million. On 20 August 2024, Equity Bank handed back to the Church of Uganda, the un-encumbered land title that had collateralized the US$17 million (USh65 billion) construction loan.

== See also ==
- Kampala Capital City Authority
- List of banks in Uganda
- Kampala Central Division
- List of tallest buildings in Kampala
- Bank of Uganda
