= Equitel =

Kenyan mobile network operator

Finserve Africa Limited
- Trade name: Equitel
- Type: Private Subsidiary
- Industry: Telecommunications
- Headquarters: Nairobi, Kenya
- Area served: Kenya
- Key people: Patrick Uwizeye - Non-Executive Chairman; Lanre Bamisebi Managing Director-Finserve; Non-Executive Directors: James Mwangi; David Somen; Brent Malahay; Mary Wamae; Joanna Bichsel; Isis Nyong'o Madison
- Products: Mobile money & telephony
- Parent: Equity Group Holdings
- Website: Homepage

Finserve Africa Limited (doing business as Equitel) is a mobile virtual network operator (MVNO) in Kenya. It is a wholly owned subsidiary of Equity Group Holdings and is using the Airtel Kenya network as its carrier.

== Overview ==
The Equitel brand was hailed by Equity Group as the "next big thing", as part of an overhaul dubbed "Equity 3.0". The move was to give Equity Bank the opportunity to continue its mission of furthering financial inclusion and innovative service offerings for all Kenyans by presenting their financial services offering on to a single platform which will make banking services more accessible, flexible convenient and more affordable. Airtel Kenya on their part stated that the partnership would increase their revenue by up to 10%.

The brand made Equity Bank the first financial institution in Africa to offer a full banking suite through an MVNO.

== History ==
Equity Bank, through its subsidiary Finserve Africa Limited, received its MVNO Licence on 11 April 2014, along with Tangaza Money and Zioncell Kenya. All which would run on Airtel Kenya's network, a move that was opposed by the Consumer Federation of Kenya, Safaricom and Telkom Kenya

For the bank, the move was aimed at lowering their transaction costs by up to 47% as well as an added revenue stream by providing money transfer and other telco services to their 14.3 million customers.

Due to the requirement to have a SIM card to access the service, users would therefore need an additional mobile phone or Dual SIM phone. Equity Bank overcame this challenge by adopting the use of 0.1 millimetres thick ultra-slim SIM cards from Taisys Solutions, using technology originally developed in China. The ultra-slim SIM cards are placed at the back of normal SIM cards therefore tackling this challenge effectively. This ultra-slim SIM cards would also come with Near Field Communication (NFC) capability that enables them to be swiped on the point of sale devices or ATM thus converting a mobile phone into a credit or debit card.

Market leader Safaricom wrote to the Communications Authority of Kenya (CAK) challenging the use of ultra-slim SIM cards stating that they could expose their subscribers to intercepted communication and financial fraud on M-Pesa service. Despite this, Finserve Africa were granted a one-year trial period through the 0763xxxxxx prefix.

On 22 September 2014, Safaricom stated that it would review its legal commitments to M-Pesa customers who opt to use the Equitel overlay SIM cards. In addition, the CCK required Finserve Africa to make a written undertaking to compensate mobile phone subscribers for any losses they may incur during the one-year trial of its thin SIM, putting to test the company’s assertion that the technology is safe.

On 14 October 2014, Equity Bank Kenya started issuing ordinary SIM cards for telecommunication and mobile banking services to its 8.7 million customers across the country.

In August 2018, Equity Group spun off its fintech arm into Finserve Africa Limited, a fully owned subsidiary with its own board and management, headed by Jack Ngare.

As of December 2018, data from the Communications Authority of Kenya showed that Equitel was the second-biggest mobile-money transfer service in Kenya with over 2.075 million subscribers. During this period, they transacted a total of Ksh467.2 billion ($4.25 billion). This value was 22.04% of Kenya’s mobile money transactions.

During 2020, the MVNO Equitel handled Ksh934 billion (approx $8.51 billion) in transaction value but the customer base had reduced to 1.8 million. As at March 2021, Equity Group’s Quarterly report showed Equitel registered a 163% volume growth of Ksh421.8 billion ($3.84 billion) from Ksh160.5 billion ($1.46 billion).

On 12 August 2021, Equity announced the roll out of its LTE or fourth-generation (4G) broadband network service for Equitel SIM cards becoming the fifth telco in Kenya to offer 4G services. According to the Communications Authority of Kenya's Second Quarter Sector Statistics Report for FY2025/26 (October–December 2025), Equitel had approximately 1.5 million active SIMs as of December 2025. During the same quarter, Finserve recorded total domestic voice traffic of 13.26 million minutes and total SMS traffic of 2.19 million messages, with an average on-net call duration of 1.4 minutes.

== Other locations ==
Equity Group Holdings plans to roll out their mobile virtual network in Uganda, Tanzania and Rwanda through their partnership with Airtel Africa.

== See also ==
- Equity Group Holdings
- Equity Bank Kenya
- Equity Bank Rwanda
- Equity Bank South Sudan
- Equity Bank Tanzania
- Equity Bank Uganda
