= Equity Bank Rwanda Limited =

Bank in Rwanda

Equity Rwanda
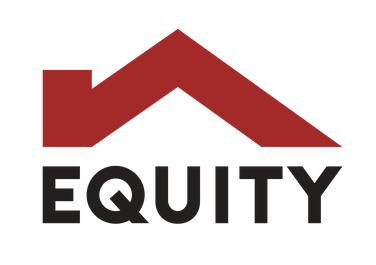
- Trade name: EQTY
- Formerly: Equity Bank Rwanda Limited
- Type: Private
- Industry: Financial services
- Founded: 2011
- Headquarters: Grand Pension Plaza; Kigali, Rwanda
- Number of locations: 47 Branches, 6,000+ Agents, 56 ATMs (2024)
- Key people: Eugene Haguma; Non–Executive Chairman; Hannington Namara; Managing Director
- Products: Loans, Checking, Savings, Investments, Debit Cards, Insurance
- Revenue: ▲ Profit After tax:US$20.9 (RWF:21.06) (July 2021)
- Total assets: US$386.54 million (RWF:389.29 billion) (July 2021)
- Number of employees: 700+ (2024)
- Parent: Equity Group Holdings Limited
- Website: rw.equitybankgroup.com

Equity Bank Rwanda Limited (EBRL), is a commercial bank in Rwanda. The bank is licensed by the National Bank of Rwanda, the central bank and national banking regulator.

== Overview ==
EBRL is a medium-sized financial services provider in Rwanda, with an estimated total asset valuation of about US$363.39 million (RWF:366.39 billion), as of 31 March 2021. The shareholders' equity was US$52.42 million (RWF: 52.86 billion).

== History ==
The bank was granted a banking license by the National Bank of Rwanda, in 2011 and commenced banking services in the fourth quarter of 2011. Rwanda was the fourth East African country where the Equity Bank Group has opened a subsidiary. Operations in Tanzania commenced during the first quarter of 2012. The bank group maintains financial services subsidiaries in Kenya, Rwanda, South Sudan, Democratic Republic of Congo, Uganda and Tanzania. Operations in Burundi are planned to begin in the next five years.

According to the New Times Rwanda, Equity Bank Rwanda received the Bank of the Year-Rwanda 2020 award by The Banker during the Bank of the Year Awards. In 2020 the bank rebranded to Equity Rwanda as it diversified into insurance, it began by being an insurance brokerage firm.

== Ownership ==
Equity Bank Rwanda Limited is a 100 percent subsidiary of the Equity Group Holdings Limited. Headquartered in Nairobi, Kenya, Equity Group Holdings Limited is the largest financial services provider in East Africa. As of 30 September 2021, Equity Group Holdings' asset base was valued at over US$10.2 billion (KES:1.12 Trillion), with shareholders' equity in excess of US$3.83 billion (KES:339.44 billion) . At this time, the group's customer base was estimated at over 14 million in the five East African countries that it served, making it the largest commercial bank on the African continent, by customer numbers.

== Developments ==
On 30 November 2023, Equity Group Holdings paid US$47 million to acquire 99.125 percent shares of stock of Cogebanque. More minority shareholders agreed to sell under the original contract price executed in June 2023. Under a separate agreement, Equity Group agreed to buy the Cogebanque headquarters building for KSh1.4 billion (US$9.2 million) within one year from the completion of the transaction.

In January 2024, following the acquisition of 99.8 percent of Cogebanque, Equity Group began the process of merging Cogebanque with Equity Bank Rwanda. The process is expected to last six months and will lead to the new combined bank, known as Equity Bank Rwanda, with 47 brick-and-motor branches, 56 ATMs, and 6,000 banking agents. The combined entity will employ about 700 staff.

== Branch Network ==
Equity Bank Rwanda Limited maintains the following branches, as of January 2024.

Equity Rwanda Branch Network
| No | Location | Number |
|---|---|---|
| 1 | Kigali | |
| 2 | Branches outside Kigali | |
| | Total | 47 |

== Equity Group Holdings Limited ==
The companies that compose the Equity Group Holdings Limited include but are not limited to the following:

1. Equity Bank Kenya Limited – Nairobi, Kenya – 100% Shareholding – A commercial bank in Kenya, serving individuals and businesses.
2. Equity Bank Rwanda Limited – Kigali, Rwanda – 100% Shareholding – A commercial bank in Rwanda, serving both individuals and businesses.
3. Equity Bank South Sudan Limited – Juba, South Sudan – 100% Shareholding – A commercial bank in South Sudan.
4. Equity Bank Tanzania Limited – Dar es Salaam, Tanzania – 100% Shareholding – A commercial bank in Tanzania.
5. Equity Bank Uganda Limited – Kampala, Uganda – 100% Shareholding – A commercial bank in Uganda.
6. Equity BCDC – Kinshasa, Democratic Republic of the Congo: 77.5 percent Shareholding – A commercial bank in DR Congo.
7. Equity Consulting Group Limited – Nairobi, Kenya
8. Equity Insurance Agency Limited – Nairobi, Kenya – 100% Shareholding – The insurance agency arm of the group. Offering bancassurance services to customers
9. Equity Nominees Limited – Nairobi, Kenya – 100% Shareholding – A Nominee company. Holding investments on behalf of customers.
10. Equity Investment Bank Limited – Nairobi, Kenya – 100% Shareholding – An investment bank in Kenya. A member of the Nairobi Securities Exchange and licensed by the Capital Markets Authority.
11. Finserve Africa Limited – Nairobi, Kenya – 100% Shareholding – A mobile virtual network operator (MVNO) in the Kenya.
12. Equity Group Foundation – Nairobi, Kenya – 100% Shareholding – The philanthropy and corporate social responsibility arm of the group.
13. Azenia - Nairobi, Kenya—100% Shareholding – A technological affiliate for developing digital solutions to the group.

The stock of Equity Group Holdings Limited is traded on the Nairobi Stock Exchange, under the symbol: EQTY. On Thursday 18 June 2009, the Group's stock cross listed on the Uganda Securities Exchange (USE), and started trading that day, under the symbol: EBL. Equity Bank Rwanda started trading at the Rwanda Stock Exchange in 2015 under the symbol EQTY.

== See also ==
- List of banks in Rwanda
- Equity Bank Group
- Economy of Rwanda
