= Gift Shoko =

Zimbabwean banker and corporate executive

- Born: c. 1972 (age 53–54); Zimbabwe
- Citizenship: Zimbabwe
- Education: University of Zimbabwe (Bachelor of Business Studies and Computer Science); Cyprus Institute of Marketing (MBA in Banking and Finance)
- Years active: 1999–present
- Known for: Business, management
- Title: Managing Director and CEO of Equity Bank Uganda

Gift Shoko is a Zimbabwean banker, businessman and business executive. Since January 2025, he is the managing director and chief executive officer of Equity Bank Uganda, a commercial bank in that country, pending approval of the Bank of Uganda, the central bank and national banking regulator.

Before that, he was the executive director of Equity Bank Uganda, under the leadership of his predecessor as CEO, Anthony Kituuka, a Ugandan national. In November 2024 the Daily Monitor reported that Kituuka had given notice of his intention to resign from the Equity Bank Group, effective 1 March 2025.

== Education ==
Shoko had his primary and secondary education in Zimbabwe. He then entered the University of Zimbabwe, where he graduated with a Bachelor's degree in Business Studies and Computer Science. His second degree, an MBA in Banking and Finance, was obtained from the Cyprus Institute of Marketing in Nicosia, Cyprus. In addition, he has completed advanced management courses and executive leadership programs from various international business schools and institutions. He is also a Certified Executive Coach by the Academy of Executive Coaching and has Genos Emotional Intelligence Certification by GENOS.

== Work experience ==
As of January 2025 his work experience went back, over 26 years. His banking career began at Nedbank Zimbabwe, where he completed a graduate management training program. He was given gradually increasing management responsibilities at the bank. He then served as the Group Chief Operating Officer and Group Chief Executive Officer at Trust Holdings Limited, a diversified financial services group, whose shares are listed on the Zimbabwe Stock Exchange.

He also worked as the Chief Executive Officer at Commercial Bank of Africa (Tanzania) Limited for five consecutive years. He then served as the Director for Regional Business at NCBA Group, where he oversaw banking subsidiaries across East Africa.

In January 2025 the board of Equity Bank Uganda, a commercial bank and a subsidiary of Equity Group Holdings Plc, appointed Gift Shoko as the CEO and managing director of the Ugandan subsidiary of the holding group. He succeeded Anthony Kituuka, the previous CEO who resigned in November 2024.

== See also ==
- Mathias Katamba
- List of banks in Uganda
