= Shōko (given name) =

- Gender: Female

Origin
- Origin: Japanese
- Meaning: Different meanings depending on the kanji used

Shōko, Shoko or Shouko (written: しょうこ, 翔子, 聖子, 祥子, 荘子, 抄子, 渉子, 昌子, 昌己, 尚子 or 匠子) is a feminine Japanese given name.

== People with the name ==
- Emperor Shōkō (称光天皇; 1401–1428), was the 101st emperor of Japan
- Shoko Aida (相田 翔子; born 1970), Japanese singer, television personality and actress
- Shoko Araki (荒木 章子), Japanese speech processing researcher
- Shoko Asahara (麻原 彰晃; 1955–2018), Japanese cult leader and terrorist
- Shōko Fujibayashi (藤林 聖子; born 1972), Japanese lyricist
- Shoko Fujimura (藤村 祥子; born 1987), Japanese speed skater
- Shoko Fusano (房野 抄子; born 1965), Japanese speed skater
- Shoko Haida (はいだ しょうこ; born 1979), Japanese singer, actress and television personality
- Shoko Hamada (footballer) (浜田 彰子), Japanese former football player
- Shōko Hamada (television personality) (浜田 翔子; born 1986), Japanese tarento, gravure idol and race queen
- Shōko Ieda (家田 荘子; born 1958), Japanese writer
- Shōko Ikeda (池田 晶子; 1975–2019), Japanese animator and character designer
- Shoko Inoue (井上 昌己; born 1969), Japanese singer
- Shoko Ishikawa (石川 翔子; born 1990), Japanese figure skater
- Shōko Kanazawa (金澤 翔子; born 1985), Japanese calligrapher
- Shoko Kashiki (樫木 祥子; born 1993), Japanese professional racing cyclist
- Shōko Kikuchi (菊地 祥子; born 1970), Japanese voice actress
- Shōko Kubo (久保 翔子; born 2006), Japanese women's professional shogi player
- Shoko Mikami (三上 尚子; born 1981), Japanese women's footballer
- Shoko Miyata (宮田 笙子; born 2004), Japanese artistic gymnast
- Shoko Nakagawa (中川 翔子; born 1985), Japanese idol
- Shōko Nakahara (中原 翔子; born 1970), Japanese actress
- Shoko Nakajima (中島 翔子; born 1991), Japanese female professional wrestler
- Shoko Noda (野田 章子; born 1969), Japanese United Nations official
- Shoko Ono (小野 粧子; born 1981), Japanese ice hockey player
- Shoko Ota (太田 渉子), Japanese Paralympic athlete
- Shoko Sakurai (櫻井 祥子; born 1984), Japanese politician
- Shoko Sasaki (ささき しょうこ; born 1996), Japanese professional golfer
- Shoko Sawada (沢田 聖子; born 1962), Japanese singer-songwriter
- Shoko Takahashi (高橋 省子), Japanese table tennis player
- Shoko Takayanagi (高柳 昌子), Japanese volleyball player
- Shōko Takiwaki (瀧脇 笙古; born 2001), Japanese member of =Love
- Shōko Tsuda (津田 匠子; born 1963), Japanese actress and voice actress
- Shoko Wada (和田 祥子; born 1952), Japanese handball player
- Shoko Yoshimura (吉村 祥子; born 1968), Japanese retired Wrestler
- Robin Shoko Okada (岡田 ロビン 翔子; born 1993), Japanese member of Ciao Bella Cinquetti
- Gift Shoko (born 1972), Zimbabwean banker, businessman and business executive

== Fictional characters ==
- Shoko Amano (天野翔子), a minor character in Soaring Sky! Pretty Cure
- Shoko Hida, a character in Happy Sugar Life
- Shōko Hirugami, the elder sister of Sachirō Hirugami, a character in Haikyū!!
- Shōko Ieiri, a supporting character in the series Jujutsu Kaisen
- Shōko Kirishima (霧島 翔子), a character in the light novel series Baka and Test
- Shoko Komi, the female protagonist in the manga series Komi Can't Communicate
- Shoko Makinohara, one of the main characters in the series Rascal Does Not Dream of Bunny Girl Senpai
- Shoko Mano, a supporting character in the series Little Battlers Experience
- Shōko Nadami, a character in AI: The Somnium Files
- Shoko Nishimiya, the female protagonist in the manga series and the movie A Silent Voice
- Shoko Sashinami, a character in the anime series Valvrave the Liberator
- Shoko, a character who is Finn the Human’s incarnation in the animated series Adventure Time
