= Shoko =

Shoko, Shōko or Shōkō may refer to:

- Shoko (Buddhist) (1162–1238), disciple of Hōnen and second patriarch of Jōdo-shū
- Emperor Shōkō (1401–1428), the 101st Emperor of Japan
- Shōko (instrument), a small gong used in the gagaku music of Japan
- Shōko (given name), a feminine Japanese given name
- Kotsuzumi, a small drum used in Japanese music
- 8306 Shoko, a main-belt asteroid
- Shoko B'Sakit, an Israeli chocolate milk sold in plastic bags
- A nickname for chocolate in Hebrew, and other languages
  - A nickname for Muhammad Abu Elhega
