= Mwangangi =

Mwangangi is a surname of Kenyan origin that may refer to:

- Caleb Mwangangi Ndiku (born 1992), Kenyan middle-distance runner and 2012 African champion
- Jimmy Mwangangi Muindi (born 1973), Kenyan marathon runner and six-time winner of the Honolulu Marathon
- John Nzau Mwangangi (born 1990), Kenyan long-distance runner and 2011 African cross country champion
- Jonathan Mwangangi Mueke (born 1976), Kenyan politician
- Telvin mwangangi puccianti

(Born 1996), kenyan travelers dancer

== See also ==
- Mwangi, a similar Kenyan name
