= Anthony Kituuka =

Ugandan accountant and corporate executive

- Born: c. 1975 (age 50–51); Uganda
- Citizenship: Uganda
- Education: Makerere University (BSc in Statistics and Applied Economics); Middlesex University (MBA in Oil and Gas); Association of Chartered Certified Accountants (FCCA)
- Years active: 2006–present
- Known for: Business, management
- Title: Managing director and CEO of Equity Bank Uganda

Anthony Kituuka is a Ugandan accountant, business executive and banker. He is the managing director and chief executive officer of Equity Bank Uganda, a commercial bank in that country, effective November 2022.

From 2016 until 2022, he was the executive director of Equity Bank Uganda, under the leadership of his predecessor as CEO, Samuel Kirubi, a Kenyan national.

In November 2024 the Daily Monitor reported that he had given notice of his intention to resign from the Equity Bank Group, effective 1 March 2025.

== Education ==
Kituuka had his primary and secondary education in Uganda. He then entered the Makerere University, Uganda's oldest and largest public university, where he graduated with a bachelor's degree in Statistics and Economics. His second degree, an MBA in Oil and Gas, was obtained from Middlesex University, in the United Kingdom. He is also a fellow of the Association of Chartered Certified Accountants, designated by the letters FCCA.

He has completed advanced management courses and executive leadership programs from Strathmore Business School, Lagos Business School, IESE Business School, Gordon Institute of Business Science and INSEAD.

== Work experience ==
As of November 2022, Kituuka's work experience went back over 15 years. His banking career began at Barclays Bank Uganda (today Absa Bank Uganda Limited), as a corporate relations manager. When he left Barclays, he was hired by KCB Bank Uganda, where he spent six years, rising to the position of head of corporate banking. He was seconded to the bank's group headquarters in Nairobi, Kenya, where he spent nine months. He was then hired in 2014 by Equity Bank Group, as the group executive director, responsible for regional subsidiaries in five African Great Lakes countries.

Kituuka took over as CEO of Equity Bank Uganda from Samuel Kirubi, who held the position from 2015 to 2022. Kirubi was appointed group chief operating officer (Group COO) for the six banking subsidiaries and was relocated to the group's headquarters in Nairobi, Kenya. At Equity Bank Uganda, Kituuka is the first Ugandan to hold the position of CEO.
