= Mwangi =

Mwangi is a name of Kenyan origin that may refer to:

- Barnabas Muturi Mwangi, Kenyan politician and Member of the National Assembly for Sisi Kwa Sisi
- Benjamin Mwangi, Kenyan politician and Member of the National Assembly for Embakasi Central
- Boniface Mwangi (born 1983), Kenyan photojournalist
- Daniel Muchunu Mwangi (born 1984), Kenyan long-distance road runner
- Daniel Waithaka Mwangi, Kenyan politician and governor of Nyandarua County
- Dick Mwangi Wathika,(1973-2015) Kenyan politician and former mayor of Nairobi
- Ephraim Mwangi Maina, Kenyan politician and Member of the National Assembly for Safina
- Ingrid Mwangi (born 1975), German artist
- James Mwangi (born 1962), Kenyan accountant, businessman, banker and entrepreneur. Group Managing Director & CEO, Equity Group Holdings Limited
- James Mwangi Macharia (born 1984), Kenyan road running athlete
- Josiah Mwangi Kariuki (1929–1975), Kenyan socialist politician
- Mwangi Kiunjuri (born 1967), Kenyan politician and former Member of the National Assembly for the Party of National Unity
- Meja Mwangi (1948–2025), Kenyan writer
- Ng'endo Mwangi (Florence), First Kenyan female doctor, First African woman to graduate Smith College 1961, and First African to graduate Albert Einstein School of Medicine in New York City
- Peter King'ori Mwangi (born 1970), Kenyan electrical engineer, accountant and business executive, Group CEO of UAP Old Mutual Group.
- Stella Mwangi (born 1986), Norwegian-Kenyan singer-songwriter and rapper

== See also ==
Peter Mwangi - supply chain manager General Printers Ltd
