= Equity Bank (United States) =

American community bank

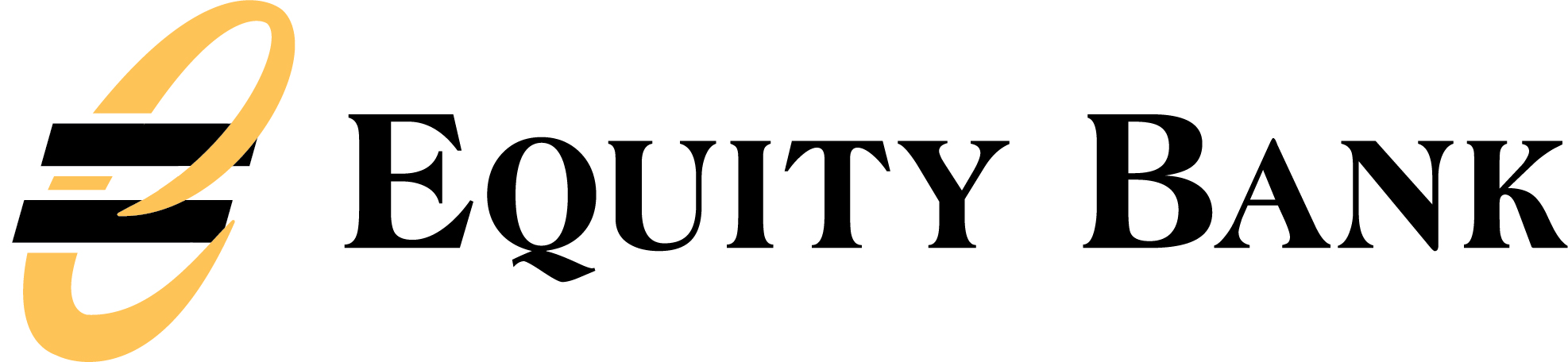
- Industry: Retail Banking; Commercial Banking
- Founded: 2002
- Founder: Brad Elliott
- Headquarters: Wichita, Kansas
- Number of locations: 85 Branches
- Area served: Arkansas; Iowa; Kansas; Missouri; Nebraska; Oklahoma
- Key people: Brad Elliott (Equity Bancshares Chairman and CEO); Rick Sems (Equity Bank CEO); Julie Huber (COO); Chris Navratil (CFO)
- Products: Credit cards; Personal checking accounts; Personal savings accounts; Business checking accounts
- Services: Loans; Insurance; Mortgage loans; Auto loans; Home equity line of credit; Equity reserve line of credit; Financial planning; Business financing
- Revenue: ▲US $200,000,000
- Total assets: US $7,600,000,000
- Number of employees: 1,000
- Parent: Equity Bancshares, Inc.

Equity Bank is a $7.6 billion community bank with more than 80 locations across Kansas, Missouri, Oklahoma, Nebraska and Arkansas. Founded in 2002, the bank held its Initial Public Offering in 2015. In 2023, it was traded on the New York Stock Exchange (ticker symbol 'EQBK') for the very first time.

Equity Bank's parent company, Equity Bancshares, Inc., is based in Wichita, Kansas. Equity Bank offers a wide variety of services including commercial loans, consumer banking, mortgage loans, and treasury management services. It also operates Brilliant Bank, a fully-online bank available to customers nationwide.

== History ==
Early 2000s

Equity Bancshares, Inc. was founded in November 2002 in Andover, Kansas by Brad Elliott. Equity Bank began its operations in 2003 with the acquisition of the National Bank of Andover. Elliot saw the move as the beginning of a period of growth for the company.

Two years later, Equity Bank expanded into Wichita, Kansas, by acquiring two locations from Hillcrest Bank, nearly tripling Equity's assets from $41 million to $120 million. In 2007, Equity Bank made its first foray into the Kansas City metropolitan area, opening a location in Lee's Summit, Missouri. The opening marked Equity's first location in Missouri, making the bank a multi-state operation.

In June 2007, Equity Bank possessed $226.9 million of assets, compared to just $52.8 million in December 2004. Later in 2007, Equity Bank merged with Signature Bancshares of Spring Hill, Kansas. The deal pushed Equity's total assets closer to $300 million, but bank executives were reportedly anxious to push that number to $500 million to $1 billion.

Equity Bank then expanded to Hays and Ellis, Kansas, through the acquisition of Ellis State Bank in 2008. Bank management believed, in order to be successful, they needed strong bank presence in both metro and community markets. As the decade came to a close, Equity Bank opened two locations in Overland Park, Kansas. The two new banks were Equity's first two locations on the Kansas side of the Kansas City Metro area.

2010-2015/Initial Public Offering

The start of a new decade spurred more growth for Equity Bank. In 2011, the bank acquired four locations in Topeka, KS, from Citizen's Bank and Trust. By the end of 2011, Equity Bank operated 15 banking offices across Kansas and Missouri with around $680 million of assets.

In 2012, Equity Bank became a billion dollar bank. The bank acquired First Community Bancshares and its 14 locations across Kansas and Missouri in late October, raising Equity's total assets to $1.2 billion. The acquisition also expanded the bank's footprint to 30 locations across Kansas and Missouri. A little more than two years later, Equity Bank merged with First Federal Savings & Loan, expanding in Southeast Kansas. The merger transferred $134 million of assets to Equity Bank, raising their overall asset holdings to about $1.5 billion.

In 2015, Equity Bank launched its Initial Public Offering. Shares were sold on the NASDAQ Global Select Market under the ticker symbol 'EQBK.' Equity Bank sold more than 1.9 million shares of its Class A common stock at $22.50 per share during the IPO. The net proceeds from the IPO were $39 million.

2016 - Present

Equity Bank expanded rapidly after the IPO in 2015, acquiring Community First Bancshares of Harrison, Arkansas the year after and solidifying their presence in a third state. The merger was Equity Bank's tenth strategic transaction since the company's inception, and the first since the IPO in November 2015. After the merger, Equity Bank possessed more than $2 billion in assets and 34 locations across three states. The move also provided Equity Bank with its first foothold in the Ozark Mountain region.

2017 saw more growth from Equity. In March, the bank merged with Prairie State Bancshares of Hoxie, Kansas. The merger gave Equity three more locations in Western Kansas and raised the bank's total assets to $2.3 billion. Equity was able to expand into Oklahoma that November by closing mergers with Eastman National Bancshares, Inc. of Ponca City, OK, and Cache Holdings, Inc. (Patriot) of Tulsa, OK. The acquisitions meant Equity Bank now operated 42 banks across four states. At year's end, Equity Bank possessed $3.17 billion in total assets, compared to $2.19 billion the year before.

Equity Bank continued its growth throughout 2018. In May, the bank expanded its footprint in Southwest Kansas and the Kansas City metro after closing mergers with Kansas Bank Corporation, the parent company of First National Bank of Liberal/Hugoton in Liberal, KS, and Adams Dairy Bancshares, the parent company of Adams Dairy Bank in Blue Springs, MO. Three months later, Equity Bank expanded further into Oklahoma, acquiring City Bank and Trust Company in Guymon, Oklahoma. This gave the bank its first presence in the Oklahoma panhandle and solidified the bank's goal of operating strong banks in both big cities and small community markets. After the acquisitions in 2018, Equity Bank operated 49 banks across four states. Assets were listed at more than $4 billion, compared to $3.17 billion the year prior.

Equity Bank continued to raise its profile in 2019. Equity acquired two banks in Guymon, OK, and one bank in Cordell, OK from Midland Financial Company in February. The acquisitions gave Equity 52 full-service bank locations across their company, including nine in Oklahoma. In September, Equity Bank was recognized as a Diversity and Inclusion Award Winner by the Wichita Business Journal, an award the company also received in 2016. Equity Bank then acquired Almenta State Bank and its two locations in Almena, KS and Norton, KS, with a purchase and assumption agreement facilitated by the Federal Deposit Insurance Corporation (FDIC) in October 2020. Equity Bank was chosen by the FDIC after a competitive bidding process. The acquisition gave Equity Bank 51 locations overall, including 23 in Kansas.

In 2021, Equity Bank became a $5 billion bank. In October, Equity merged with the parent company of American State Bank & Trust in Wichita, KS. CEO Brad Elliott called the moved "The largest merger in the company's history." The merger added 17 locations to Equity's banking network across the Wichita metro, as well as Central, North Central, and Southwest, KS. After the merger, Equity owned and operated 67 locations across Kansas, Missouri, Oklahoma, and Arkansas, and was projected to have around $5.0 billion in assets.

Two months later, Equity Bank bought three bank locations and their assets in St. Joseph, Mo., from Security Bank of Kansas City. After the purchase, Equity operated 16 banks in Missouri, including five on the Missouri-side of the Kansas City metro.

In May 2023, Equity Bancshares (EQBK) was traded on the New York Stock Exchange for the first time. CEO Brad Elliott saw the company's move to the NYSE as a boon not only for investors, but also for the bank's overall growth. The company's stock rose nearly 3% on its first day on the NYSE.

In February 2024, Equity completed a merger with Rockhold BanCorp, the parent company of the Bank of Kirksville in Kirksville, MO. The move added eight locations to Equity's existing footprint. In July, Equity acquired KansasLand Bancshares and its two locations in Quinter and Americus, Kansas. After the move, Equity Bank had a network of 74 banks across four states and $5.3 billion is assets.

Equity completed its acquisition of NBC Corp. of Oklahoma on July 3, 2025, in Oklahoma City, Oklahoma. This brought the bank to $6.4B in assets and brought the total locations to 82.

In 2025 the bank also entered into Iowa through the opening of a loan production office.

They completed the acquisition of Frontier Holdings, LLC, the parent of Frontier Bank in Omaha, Nebraska, on January 1, 2026. The Frontier acquisition marked Equity Bank’s entry into Nebraska and resulted in proforma assets of $7.9B.

== Services/Lines of Business ==
- Personal Banking
- Checking
  - Early Pay: Customers receive direct deposits to checking account 24-48 hours early
- Savings
- Lending
  - Auto loans
  - Mortgages
  - Home equity line of credit
  - Everyday credit card
- Health Savings
- Online Banking
  - SavvyMoney Credit Score: A comprehensive credit score program available to all online banking customers. The service provides customers with their latest credit score and report, the factors that impact their credit score, as well as offers to reduce interest costs
- Specialty Loans
  - Aviation Loans
  - Medical practice loans
- Trust & Wealth Management
  - Investment management
  - Wealth transfer planning
  - Retirement planning
  - Risk management
  - Business succession planning
  - Private Banking
- Digital Wealth Management
  - SimplyInvest: A Digital wealth management platform Equity Bank offers in partnership with Marstone. Customers can start to invest with $500 on the all-digital investment tool.

== Brilliant Bank ==
Brilliant Bank is a fully online subsidiary of Equity Bank the specializes in deposit accounts. Established in 2022, Brilliant Bank was recognized with an Innovation Award by the Wichita Business Journal in 2024. The online-only bank saw more than $175 million of deposits in its first 10 months.

Brilliant Bank offers checking accounts, money market accounts, and certificates of deposits (CDs) to customers nationwide. The bank has no physical locations, providing its services to customers online or through its mobile app. Brilliant Bank has no ATM fees. The average minimum account balance at the bank is $100,000.
