= Shoko Noda =

Japanese United Nations official

- 野田章子 のだ しょうこ

United Nations Assistant Secretary-General
- Incumbent
- Assumed office November 14, 2023
- Appointed by: António Guterres

United Nations Development Programme Assistant Administrator and Director of Crisis Bureau
- Incumbent
- Assumed office November 14, 2023
- Appointed by: António Guterres

Personal details
- Born: 1969; 57 years ago Nishinomiya, Hyogo prefecture
- Citizenship: (Japan) Japanese
- Education: Keio University

Shoko Noda (born 1969) is a Japanese United Nations official currently serving as assistant secretary-general, assistant administrator, and director of the Crisis Bureau of the United Nations Development Programme (UNDP). With a career spanning over 25 years in the United Nations system, she spearheaded her expertise in peacebuilding and management.

== Personal life and education ==
Shoko Noda was born in the Hyogo Prefecture of Japan. Her formative experience during her university years, where she encountered stark inequalities, especially among children in Cebu, Philippines, sparked a deep-rooted passion for international cooperation which ultimately guided her towards a career in this field.

She completed her education at Konan Girls' Senior High School before attending Keio University, where she graduated in 1993 from the Department of Political Science, Faculty of Law. She continued her education at the same institution, earning a master's degree in political science in 1995. Noda is the distinguished recipient of the 13th Nakasone Yasuhiro Award, which recognizes young individuals for their active and bold efforts in tackling global issues. Outside of her professional life, she enjoys jogging, yoga, golf, and scuba diving, and is particularly fond of cats.

== Career ==
After completing her master's degree, Shoko Noda began her career at the Mitsubishi Research Institute. In 1998, she embarked on her United Nations journey with the UNDP in Tajikistan, subsequently taking on roles in UNDP Kosovo and UNDP Federal Republic of Yugoslavia. From 2002 to 2005, she worked at the UNDP Headquarters in New York as a programme specialist, under the direct supervision of George Mark Malloch-Brown, the then administrator of UNDP.

Following this, Noda joined the United Nations Organization Mission in the Democratic Republic of the Congo (MONUC), later renamed the United Nations Organization Stabilization Mission in the Democratic Republic of the Congo (MONUSCO), as chef de cabinet to the deputy special representative of the secretary general. Her career path then led her to the United Nations Resident Coordinator's Office as recovery coordination adviser in Pakistan. She served as the deputy resident representative of UNDP Mongolia, resident representative of UNDP Nepal, and held the dual roles of United Nations resident coordinator and UNDP resident representative in Maldives.

After completing her tenure as resident representative with UNDP India, Noda was appointed as assistant secretary-general, assistant administrator, and director of the Crisis Bureau at the UNDP Headquarters in New York on 27 September 2023.

Since her initial deployment to post-conflict Tajikistan in 1998 as a junior professional officer (JPO), Shoko Noda has honed her expertise in peacebuilding, particularly in countries affected by conflict. She has specialized in programme formulation and implementation, with a focus on reconstruction and Disaster Risk Reduction (DRR). Noda possesses extensive experience in leading development programmes in complex political environments, including in countries like India, the Maldives, and Nepal.

== Videos ==
- UNDP India (08 Nov. 2023) "Goodbye and Thank You, India!"
- UNDP India (27 Oct. 2023) "UNDP India wins the Gold Gender Equality Seal 2023"
- UNDP Tokyo Representation Office (25 Sept. 2023) "Mr. Keizo Takemi, the Minister of Health, Labour and Welfare of Japan, visited the forefront of India's digitalization efforts for its vaccine programme"
- UNDP India (29 Dec. 2023) "2022 Highlights & Year-End Message from UNDP India and partners"
- UNDP India (28 Dec. 2021) "2021 Highlights & Year-End Message from UNDP India"
- UNDP India (14 Nov. 2022) "2020 End of Year Message: Shoko Noda, Resident Representative"
- UNDP Tokyo Representation Office (29 Oct. 2021) "UNDP, in partnership with Japan, supplied oxygen generation plants to India in response to the COVID-19 crisis"
- UNDP India (08 June 2021) "Enabling #SafaiSathis with access to social protection"
- UNDP Tokyo Representation Office (09 April 2019) "Women Resident Representatives in UNDP recounting their thoughts on being leaders"
