= James Mwangi =

Kenyan banker

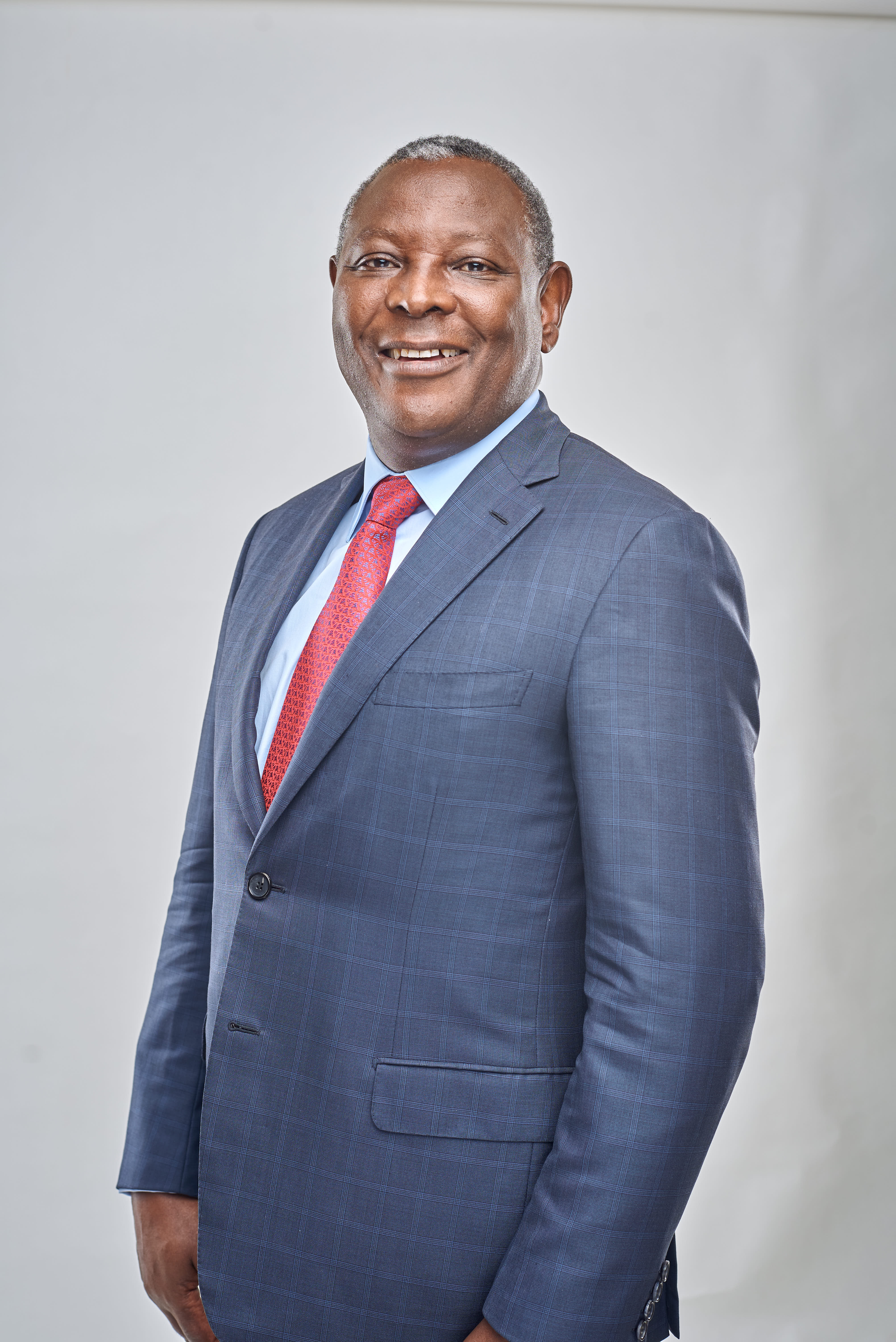
- Mwangi in 2020
- Born: 1962 (age 63–64); Kangema, Muranga County, Kenya
- Education: University of Nairobi
- Occupations: Accountant; banker; entrepreneur
- Years active: 1991–present
- Employer: Equity Group Holdings Plc
- Known for: Turning around Equity Bank from a loss making entity in 1993 and making it one of the largest banks in East and Central Africa with an asset base of USD 9 billion as at 2020
- Title: Group managing director and group CEO, Equity Group Holdings
- Partner: Jane Njuguna
- Children: 3

James Mwangi (born 1962) is a Kenyan accountant, career banker, businessman, and entrepreneur. He is the current group managing director and group chief executive officer of Equity Group Holdings Plc, the banking conglomerate with one of the largest customer bases on the African continent, over 14 million as of December 2019.

Mwangi was included on The Financial Times' 2009 list of the top 50 thought leaders of emerging markets and the top 20 most influential people in Africa. He was the founding chairman of the Kenya Vision 2030 Delivery Board from 2007 to 2019, charged with ensuring Kenya became a middle-income country with high living standards by 2030. He is a Presidential National Task Force member on the Kenya COVID-19 Emergency Response Fund and chair of its health committee. Mwangi is also the current chancellor of Meru University College of Science and Technology.

In April 2025, Mwangi was awarded the Freedom of the City of London honors for his work in enhancing inclusive financial and economic growth and empowering underserved communities.

== Early life and education ==
Mwangi was born in Kangema, in Kenya's Central Province, circa 1962. He and his six siblings were raised by their widowed mother, Grace Wairimu. He witnessed the struggles in his family and community at an early age to make a livelihood, which inspired him to better his circumstances. Mwangi credits his mother for instilling the virtues of discipline, hard work, giving back to society, and humility into him from childhood.

He attended Nyagatugu Primary School in Kangema Village, going on to attend Ichagaki Secondary School on a government scholarship. He attended Kagumo High School for his A-level education, where he studied economics, English literature, and geography. He joined the University of Nairobi, graduating with a Bachelor of Commerce degree, after which he sat and passed the Certified Public Accountant of Kenya (CPAK) examinations. He is also a graduate of the advanced management programme at the IESE Business School in Barcelona, Spain.

Mwangi holds five honorary doctorate degrees, a Doctor of Business Administration from Kenya Methodist University, Doctor of Humane Letters from Kenyatta University, and Doctor of Entrepreneurship from the Jomo Kenyatta University of Agriculture and Technology. He also has a Doctor of Business Management (Honours Causa) from Meru University of Science and Technology and a Doctorate of Letters from Africa Nazarene University.

== Career ==
Mwangi began his career in banking as an auditor at PricewaterhouseCoopers. He soon moved to Ernst & Young, where he worked for three years before joining Trade Bank. In 1991, he left his job as the group's financial controller at Trade Bank on invitation by the then-senior executives of Equity Building Society (EBS), the precursor to Equity Bank, to steer the financial institution from insolvency. Mwangi joined Equity Building Society as the Finance and Operations Director, a position he held until 2004 when he became the CEO. Together with the then managing director, John Mwangi, and the chairman, Peter Munga, they constituted the board.

Mwangi converted his KSh.7 million/= deposit at the time with Equity Building Society to ordinary shares, making him one of the key shareholders. The company was losing KSh.5 million/= (approx. US$60,000 at the time) annually and, at that time, had accumulated total losses of KSh.33 million/= (approx. US$380,000 at the time). Equity had been declared insolvent at position 66 out of 66 by its regulator, the Central Bank of Kenya, in 1993. Mwangi was appointed Director of Strategy and Finance and set about retraining staff focusing on customer care. He also encouraged them to use their networks to attract members to the society and use 25% of their salaries to buy Equity Building Society shares. In 1997, the society began to sell shares to customers and pay annual dividends.

In 2006, Equity Bank listed on the Nairobi Securities Exchange (NSE). On 18 June 2009, the group's stock cross-listed on the Uganda Securities Exchange and the Rwanda Stock Exchange in 2015. As of December 2019, the group had subsidiaries in six countries and a commercial representative office in Ethiopia. Equity Group Holdings is a large financial services organisation in East Africa in terms of customer base and has an asset base valued at over KSh.900 billion/= (approx. US$9 billion).

In 2020, Equity Bank was granted approval to merge two subsidiaries (Equity Bank Congo (EBC) and Banque Commercial du Congo (BCDC)) in the Democratic Republic of Congo (DRC). The two subsidiaries formed a new bank by the name Equity Banque Commercial du Congo (Equity BCDC) which made it the second largest bank in DRC.

Mwangi is a guest lecturer at Stanford University, Columbia University, the Massachusetts Institute of Technology (MIT), Harvard University, IESE Business School, and Lagos Business School.

Mwangi has also served on boards and in advisory roles at the Global Advisory Council for VISA Inc., the Global Advisory Council for MasterCard, the Clinton Global Initiative, the G8 New Alliance For Food Security And Nutrition, President Barack Obama’s Initiative for Global Development, the G20 Advisory Board of Agriculture and Initiative for Global Development, and the Global Agenda Council on New Economic Thinking of the World Economic Forum.

He has also served on the UN Advisory Groups on Inclusive Finance and Global Sustainability. He also served as an external advisor on a high-level panel on inclusive finance to the Bill and Melinda Gates Foundation. Additionally, he is on the Economic Advisory Board to the president of IFC (International Finance Corporation), the Advisory Network to the High-Level Panel for a Sustainable Ocean Economy, the Nairobi Advisory Board of Columbia Global Centres, Yale University President’s Council on International Activities, the Inaugural Board of African Leadership Academy and has been chair of the steering committee of the Young African Leaders Initiative (YALI) Regional Leadership Center, East Africa. He is a member of UNDP’s (United Nations Development Program) African Influencers for Development (AI4Dev), private sector AfroChampions initiative, and a board member of Sustainable Development Goals Center for Africa (SDGC/A).

Mwangi served on the technical team that formulated Kenya’s Vision 2030 from 2003 to 2007 and became the Vision 2030 Delivery Board chair from 2007 to 2019. During this period, Kenya’s GDP rose tenfold from US$10 billion to US$100 billion.

In September 2020, it was alleged that Mwangi was taken to court for land grabbing of property of a private company in Muthaiga. According to the allegations, Mwangi used police to evict personnel of a private company Mount Pleasant and installed his security personnel.

== Personal life ==
Mwangi is married and has three sons. Together with his wife they own shares in the stock of Equity Group Holdings and Britam Holdings.

Mwangi is the executive chairman of Equity Group Foundation (EGF), which he founded in 2008.

=== Wings to Fly ===
In 2010, under Mwangi's leadership, Equity Bank launched the Wings to Fly initiative, which provides scholarships to needy students in Kenya. Since its inception, a total of 26,304 students have benefited from the program, with 633 having joined leading global learning institutions.

His family’s notable contributions include US$4 million in donations to support the COVID-19 Response in Kenya, Rwanda, and DRC. US$1 million to set up a business incubation center at Meru University of Science and Technology, US$500,000 to his local village school, Nyagatugu Secondary School, and US$300,000 each to both the African Leadership Academy, South Africa and Church House in Uganda.

== Awards and honors ==
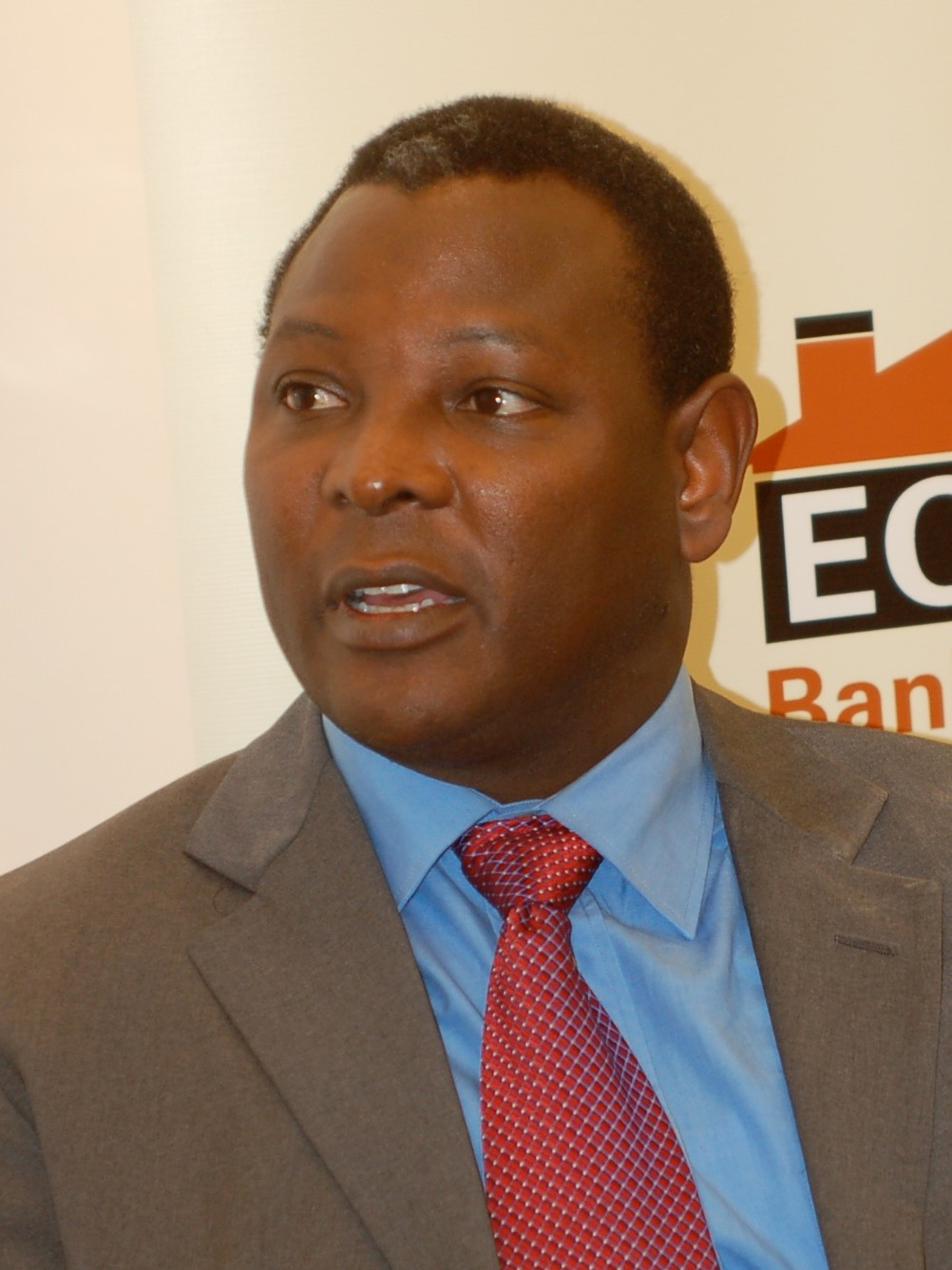
Mwangi pictured in 2007

Global

- Freedom of the City of London Honoree 2025
- Winner 2020 Oslo Business for Peace Award.
- Bloomberg 50, 2019
- Ernst and Young's World Entrepreneur of the Year, 2012
- International Planned Parenthood Federation (IPPF) Award for Philanthropy, 2012
- Financial Times’ Top 50 Emerging Market Business Leaders and the 20 Most Influential People in Africa, 2011
- African Person of the Year Runner-up - Commonwealth Business Council, 2009
- The G8 Global Vision Award, 2007

Regional

- Think Business Banking Awards- CEO of the Year: 2019 and 2020,
- African CEO of the Year- African Business Leadership Awards 2020
- Banker Africa (East Africa), Banker of the Year: 2017, 2018
- African Business Leader of the Year - The Africa Investor Awards, 2013
- Innovation Leader of the Year- The Africa Investor Awards, 2012
- African Leader of the Year- African Leadership Network 2012
- All Africa Business Leader Award- ABN & CNBC Africa 2012
- Forbes Africa Person of the Year: 2012
- Ernst & Young Africa Entrepreneur of the Year award Master Category 2011
- African Banker Awards, African Banker of the Year: 2010, 2011, 2018
- CEO of the Year - The Africa Investor Awards, 2009 and 2015
- Africa Investor Awards, CEO of the Year: 2009, 2015

National honours

- Chief of the Order of the Burning Spear
- Moran of the Order of the Burning Spear
- Head of State's Commendation (Kenya)
- Uzalendo (patriotism) Award - a commendation by the president of Kenya for contribution to the country's COVID-19 response.

Source: Equity Group Holdings

== See also ==
- List of African millionaires
- List of wealthiest people in Kenya
