= Equity Bank Kenya Limited =

Financial services provider

- Trade name: Equity Bank
- Industry: Banking
- Founded: 2014; 12 years ago (following corporate restructure)
- Headquarters: Britam Tower, Upper Hill, Nairobi, Kenya
- Area served: Kenya
- Key people: Vijay Gidoomal (Chairman); Moses Okoth Nyabanda (Managing Director).
- Products: Loans, Mortgages, Investments, Debit Cards, Credit cards
- Revenue: ▲:Aftertax: US$308.32 million (KES:33.9 billion) (2021)
- Total assets: KES 960,938,706,000 (2024): ▲KES 903,308,779,000 (2023); KES 894,011,760,000 (2022)
- Total equity: ▼KES 97,430,969,000 (2023); KES 97,527,391,000 (2022)
- Number of employees: 7,763 (December 2023)
- Parent: Equity Group
- Website: equitygroupholdings.com/ke/

Equity Bank Kenya Limited is a Kenyan bank and financial services provider headquartered in Nairobi providing retail banking and commercial banking services. The bank is licensed as a commercial bank by the Central Bank of Kenya, which is the national banking regulator of Kenya.

In 2010 the bank introduced the Agency banking model, which has proved a success and is regulated by Central Bank of Kenya Prudential guidelines.

== History ==
Equity Bank Kenya Limited was incorporated in 2014, as a result of the corporate restructure of its parent company Equity Group Holdings Limited. Prior to November 2014, Equity Group Holdings Limited operated both as a licensed bank and a holding company for its subsidiaries.

On 31 October 2014, Equity Bank announced its intention to incorporate a new, wholly owned subsidiary Equity Bank Kenya Limited, to which it would transfer its Kenyan banking business, assets and liabilities. By converting Equity Group Holdings Limited into a non-trading holding company (as defined under the Banking Act) that owns both banking and non-banking subsidiary companies and provides strategic, brand, risk and personnel management to its subsidiaries, the group would be better able to invest and develop the businesses.

During an extraordinary shareholders general meeting held on 24 November 2014, it was resolved to restructure the firm, leading to the formation of Equity Bank Kenya Limited.

According to the business daily, the bank rebranded in 2019 in a bid to do business under one brand for the next phase of growth as the bank was marking 35 years. In 2020, Equity Bank acquired Banque Commercial Du Congo (BCDC).

== Awards ==
Equity Bank Kenya won the most Socially Responsible Bank of the Year by the African Banker Awards for the year of 2019 and also Bank of the Year in Kenya award by The Banker for the year 2019.

On 24 April 2026, at the 22nd Think Business Banking Awards, it was named as the best overall Kenyan bank.

== Ownership ==
The Equity Bank Kenya Limited is wholly owned by the Equity Group Holdings, which has a customer base in excess of 14 million in six East African countries, making it one of the largest commercial banks on the African continent by number of customers.

== Branch network ==
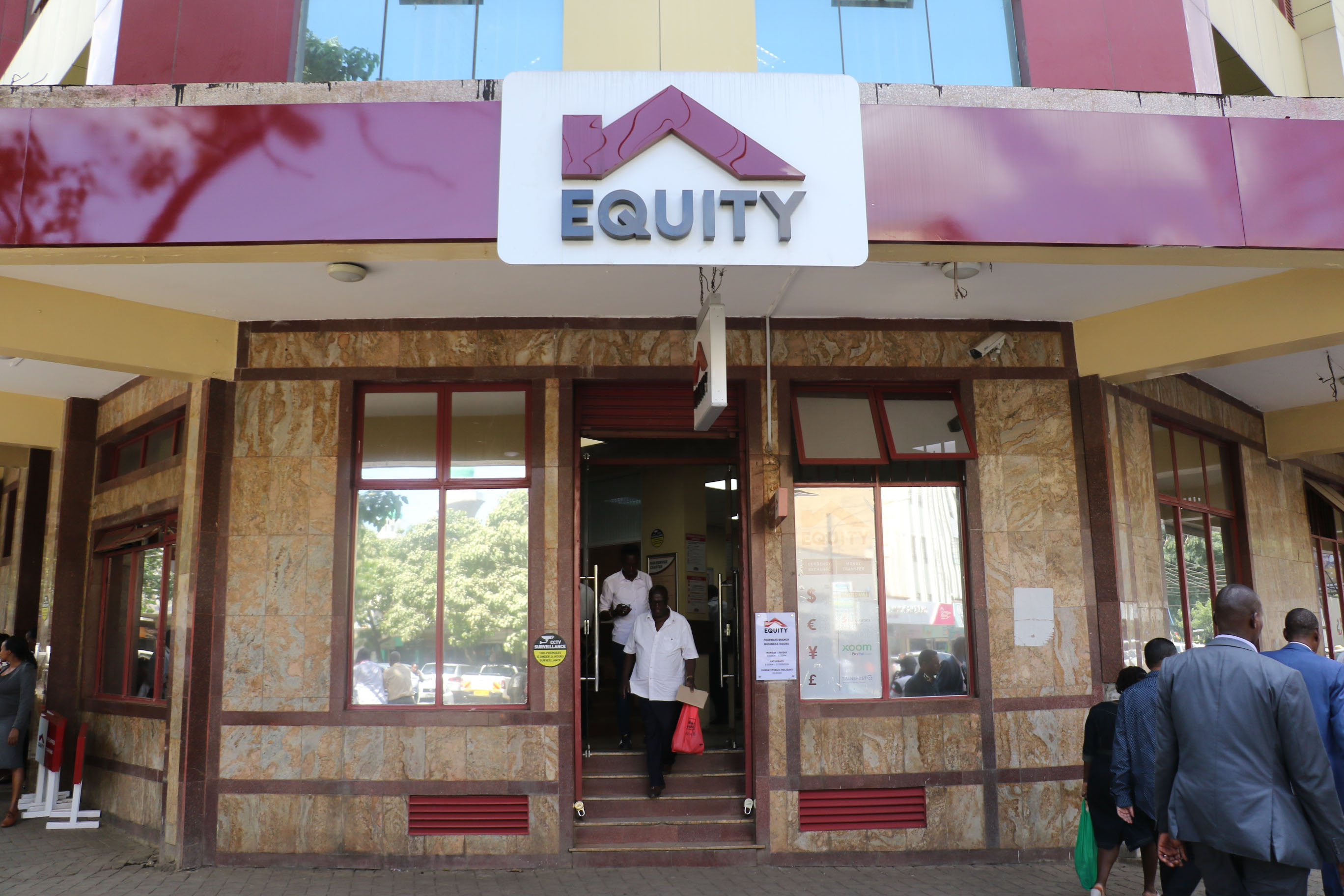
Equity Branch Fourways Branch in Nairobi, Kenya

Equity Bank maintains a network of 190 branches across Kenya, which includes 52 branches in Nairobi.

== Governance ==
The eight-member board of directors is chaired by Vijay Gidoomal. Moses Nyabanda, serves as the managing director of the bank.

== Controversies and fraud ==
Equity Bank has found itself in the midst of controversies, especially cyber fraud associated with its ATM cards, Equitel SIM cards, and Eazzybanking (a mobile banking platform) services that lead to the loss of clients' savings. Although the cases are scattered, they have been relatively consistent recently, prompting the bank to issue statements warning customers about the same and adding more security layers to its services. For instance, the bank introduced a one-time PIN to its mobile banking and internet banking services. It is also suspected that some cases are a result of inside job from unethical employees and agents and that refunds are not guaranteed with some clients reporting threats and intimidation when making followups.

In the past, Equity Bank employees have also been implicated in tax evasion scandals. In 2016, the bank surrendered two of its employees to the KRA for prosecution over their role in facilitating tax evasion, in which Ksh.124 million in import duty was lost.

In January 2021, Equity Bank Congo was embroiled in a controversy with the Congolese Central Bank after its merger with the country’s second-largest bank, Banque Commerciale du Congo (BCDC). In the middle of the controversy was a memo in which James Mwangi unilaterally announced plans to integrate BCDC's operations and data into Equity Group's database, set up an initial management committee, and appoint two managing directors. The Banque Centrale du Congo disapproved of the decisions arguing that the "Legal and regulatory requirements do not allow for two managing directors to oversee one institution" and that Mr. Mwangi had no capacity to make the decisions as he was only a "representative of a shareholder and has not been mandated by the acquiring company to make decisions on its behalf."

In May 2023, a customer sued the lender for an alleged breach of their privacy after the bank shared his information with an unauthorized third party without consent.

In April 2024, reports emerged that a 7-day hackers expedition made away with Ksh 179,677,736 from 551 customers through debit card fraud.

== See also ==
- List of banks in Kenya
- Central Bank of Kenya
