= Equity BCDC =

Bank in the Democratic Republic of the Congo

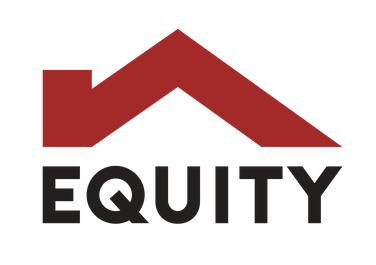

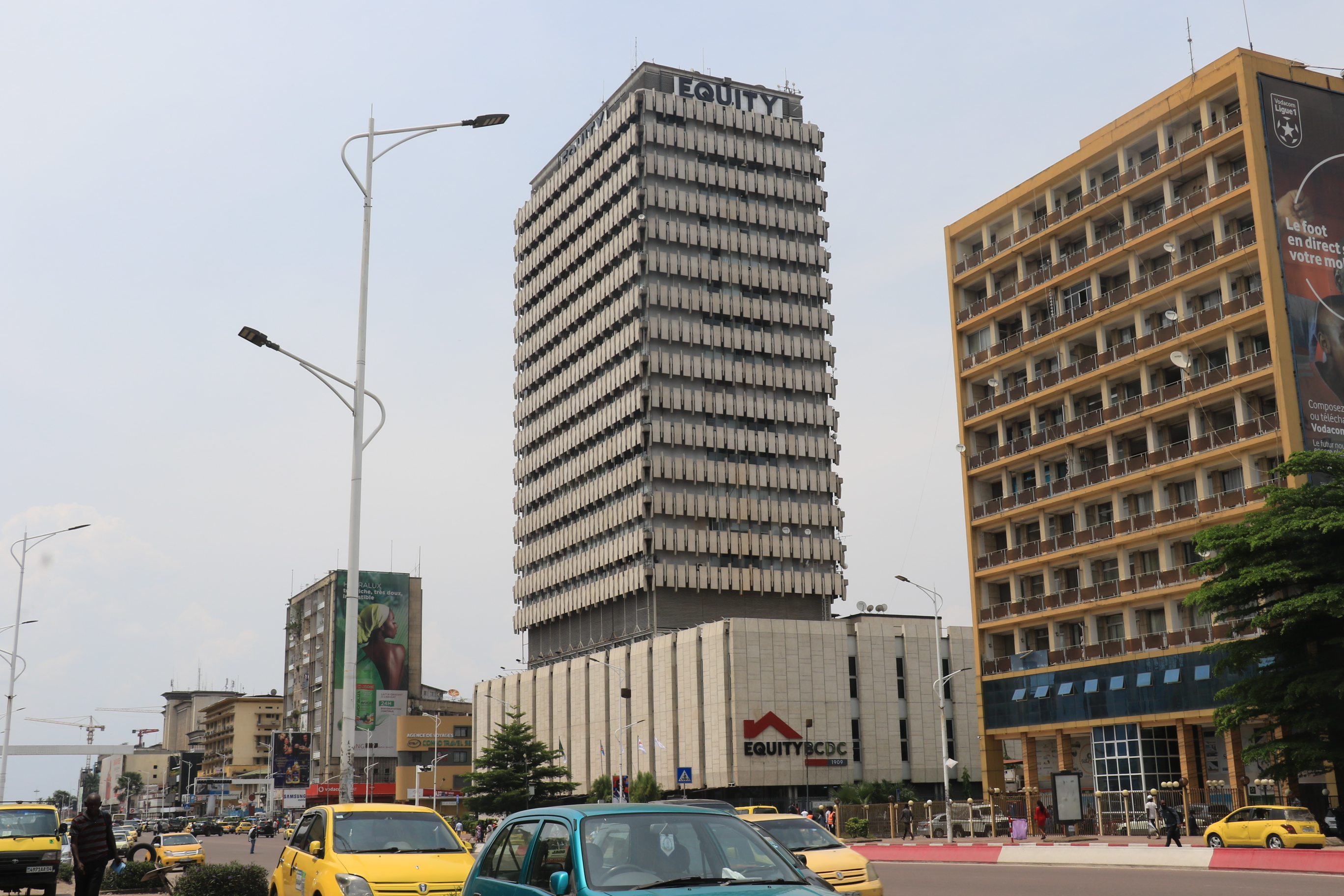
- EquityBCDC headquarter in Kinshasa
- Formerly: Equity Bank DRCongo
- Company type: Private company Subsidiary of Equity Group Holdings Limited
- Industry: Finance
- Headquarters: Kinshasa, Kinshasa, Democratic Republic of the Congo
- Number of locations: 74 branches (2022)
- Area served: Democratic Republic of Congo
- Key people: Nestor Ankiba (chairman); Celestin Mukeba Muntuabu (managing director); Jean Claude Tshipama (deputy managing director)
- Services: Financial services
- Net income: (after-tax) USD 32.82 million (Q1: 2024)
- Total assets: US$4.75 billion (KSh622 billion) (2023)
- Members: 1,300,000+ (2021)

Equity Banque Commerciale du Congo (Equity BCDC) is a commercial bank in the Democratic Republic of the Congo. It is a merger between Equity Bank Congo (EBC), formerly ProCredit Bank DRCongo, and Banque Commerciale du Congo. This followed the acquisition of majority shareholding in both banks by the Equity Group Holdings Limited, a Kenya-based financial services conglomerate with total assets in excess of US$10 billion.

== Overview ==
As of December 2021, EquityBCDC had total assets of US$3.7 billion, with over 1,300,000 bank accounts. In the calendar year ended 31 December 2021, the bank realized an after-tax profit of US$40.2 million and paid tax amounting to US$9.4 million to the DRC government.

== Equity Bank Congo ==
EBC was a commercial bank in the DRC. As of May 2015, it was the seventh largest commercial bank in the country, with assets exceeding US$200 million and shareholders' equity of US$25 million. At that time, its customer base exceeded 170,000.

According to 2015 tax filings by Equity Group Holdings Limited, Procredit Bank had an asset base of about US$228.4 million, a loan book of about US$132.67 million, customer deposits of about US$185.5 million, and shareholder's equity valued at US$29 million at the time it was acquired by EGHL. Procredit made an after-tax profit valued at US$5.525 million in calendar year 2015. (Note: US$1.00 = KSh100.3, on 30 March 2016.)

As of August 2018, Equity Bank Congo was reported to be the most profitable subsidiary in the Equity Bank Group, during the first six months of calendar year 2018.

== History ==
Before May 2015, three corporate entities jointly owned 79 percent of Procredit's stock: Procredit Bank, the German Investment Corporation, and Stichting DOEN. The remaining 21 percent was held by KfW (12 percent) and the International Finance Corporation (9 percent).

On 26 May 2015, Equity Group Holdings Limited (EGHL) of Kenya, a large financial services conglomerate announced that it had agreed to pay US$60 million for 79 percent shareholding in Procredit Bank. EGHL has a customer base exceeding 9.2 million in the five East African countries it serves, making it the largest commercial bank on the African continent by customer numbers. The deal was concluded following regulatory approval by Kenyan and Congolese authorities, which was obtained in September 2015.

== Banque Commerciale du Congo ==
The origins of BCDC go back to the establishment in 1909 of the Banque du Congo Belge. Prior to the merger with EBC, BCDC was the second largest bank in the DRC, as measured by balance sheet and shareholders equity. On 9 September 2019, Equity Bank Group, announced that it had acquired a controlling stake in BCDC.

In September 2019, Equity Bank Group began talks to acquire a controlling stake in Banque Commerciale du Congo (BCDC), the second-largest commercial bank in the Democratic Republic of the Congo. If and when the transaction is concluded, the new acquisition is expected to be merged with the existing Equity Bank Congo.

In November 2019, Business Daily Africa reported that Equity Bank Group had agreed to pay US$106 million (KSh10.7 billion) to the George Arthur Forrest Group, in exchange of 66.5 percent ownership in BCDC. In addition, Equity Group Holdings was contemporaneously in negotiations with KfW, to acquire an extra 7.6 percent stake in Equity Bank Congo. All these acquisitions are subject to regulatory and shareholder approval from Kenya, DR Congo and COMESA.

As of 16 November 2020, Kenyan print media reported that Equity Bank Group had completed the acquisition of 66.53 percent shareholding in BCDC, after paying US$95 million in August 2020. As of then, the merger between BCDC and Equity Bank Congo was ongoing.

On 27 November 2020, Equity Group Holdings acquired a 7.7 percent stake in Equity Bank Congo SA from KfW for $9million, raising its shareholder ownership to 94.3 percent.

== Ownership ==
As of November 2021, the shareholding in Equity Banque Commerciale du Congo, is as illustrated in the table below:

EquityBCDC stock ownership
Rank	Name of owner	Percentage ownership
1	Equity Group Holdings Limited	94.3
2	Minority shareholders	5.7
	Total	100.00

== Branches ==
As of May 2015, PBD maintained 15 networked service branches. At that time, EGHL planned to increase the branch list to 30. As of August 2018, the bank's branch list had increased to 41. This number further increased to 74 branches as of December 2020. As of May 2022, EquityBCDC maintained 74 brick and mortar branches and over 7,400 banking agents throughout the country.

== Rebranding ==
In July 2018, nearly three years since the acquisition by EGHL, Procredit Bank re-branded to Equity Bank Congo, to reflect the prevailing shareholding. In December 2020, following the issuance of approval from DRC government regulators, EGHL began the process of merging EBC and BCDC to form EquityBCDC. On 30 December 2020, Equity Group Holdings received regulatory approval from the DRC to merge Equity Bank Congo (EBC) and Banque Commerciale du Congo (BCDC) to form a new bank EquityBCDC.

As of December 2020, according to The EastAfrican, EquityBCDC had total assets in excess of US$2.5 billion and a total of 74 bank branches. At that time its customer base was nearly one million clients.

In February 2021, the bank announced its new identity following the merger into EquityBCDC, with a balance sheet of $2.7 billion and a financial lending ability of up to $40 million to a single customer. As of May 2021, according to Business Daily Africa, the merged bank EquityBCDC was the second-largest in DRC, with an asset base of $3 billion (Ksh322 billion). Equity Group Holdings Limited held a 77.5 percent share and the remainder was held by IFC (International Finance Corporation), the government of DRC and other minority shareholders.

== See also ==
- List of banks in the Democratic Republic of the Congo
