= Equity Bank Uganda Limited =

Bank in Uganda

Coordinates: 00°18′49″N 32°34′46″E

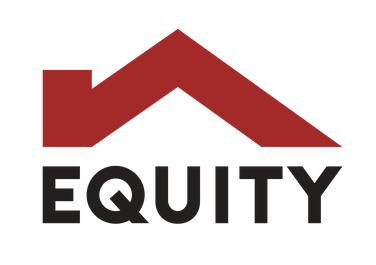

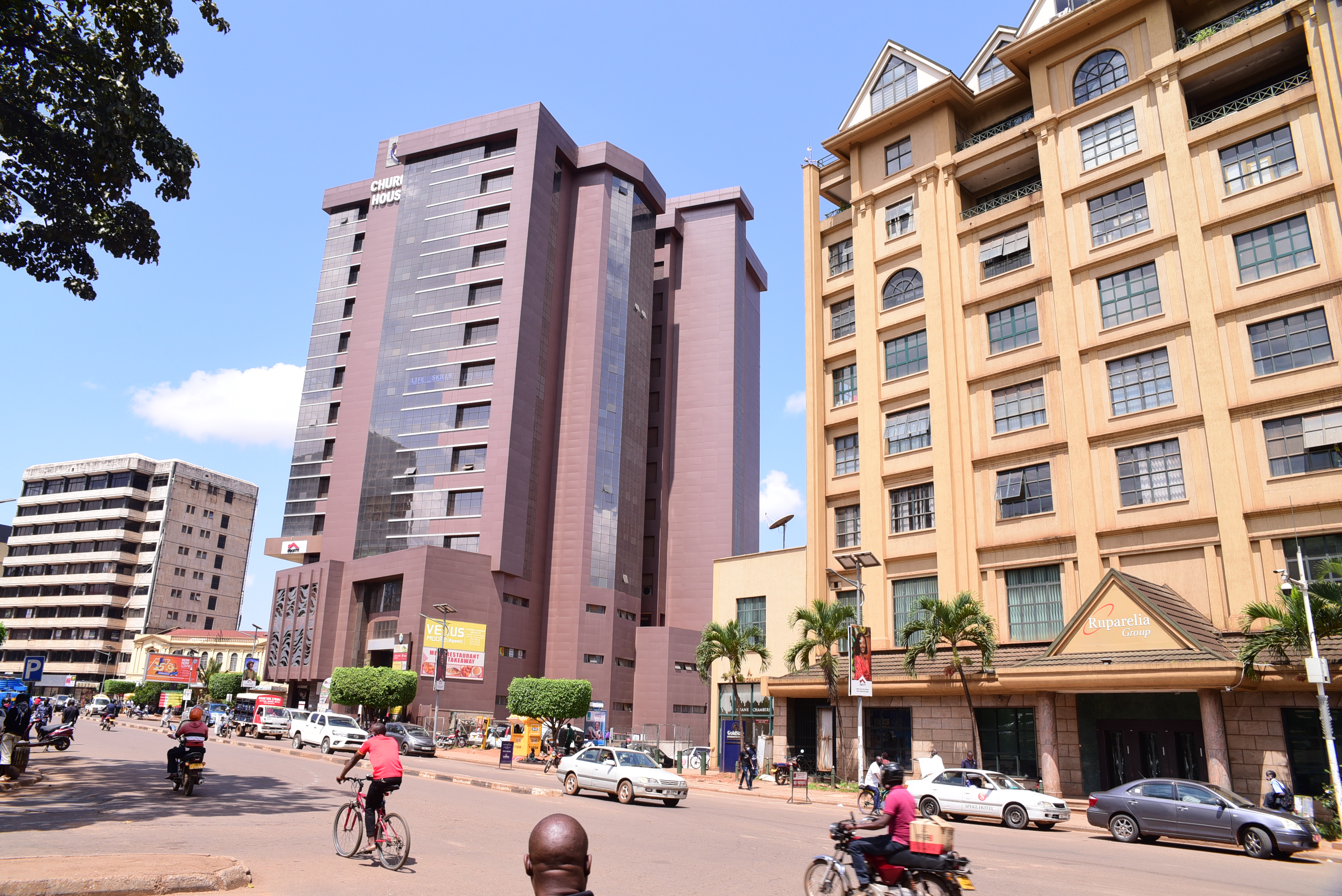
- Equity Bank Uganda headquarters at the Church House, Kampala Road, Kampala, Uganda
- Type: Private
- Industry: Financial services
- Predecessor: Uganda Microfinance
- Founded: 2008; 18 years ago
- Headquarters: Janani Luwum Church House; 34 Kampala Road, Kampala, Uganda
- Key people: Mark Ocitti: chairman Gift Shoko: managing director
- Products: Loans, checking, savings, investments
- Revenue: ▼Beforetax: UGX:18.8 billion (US$5.08 million) (2023)
- Total assets: UGX: 3.748 trillion (US$1.014 billion) (2023)
- Number of employees: 600+ (2018)
- Parent: Equity Group Holdings Limited
- Website: Homepage

Equity Bank Uganda Limited (EBUL) is a commercial bank in Uganda. It is licensed by the Bank of Uganda, the central bank and national banking regulator. EBUL is a subsidiary of Equity Group Holdings Limited, a financial service conglomerate with headquarters in Kenya and subsidiaries in six countries of the African Great Lakes Region.

== Location ==
The bank maintains its headquarters and main branch in Janani Luwum Church House, at 34 Kampala Road, in the central business district of Kampala, Uganda's capital and largest city.

== Overview ==
The bank provides services to individuals and to small and medium business enterprises. As of 31 December 2023, the bank's total assets were valued at UGX:3.748 trillion ($1.014 billion).

By 30 June 2020, the bank's total assets had grown to UGX1.823 trillion ($520 million). In December 2020, EBUL's total assets were valued at USh:2.069 trillion (US$590 million). At that time, it was the 7th largest commercial bank in Uganda by assets.

As of December 2021, total assets were valued at UGX: 2.9 trillion (approx. US$745 million), with customer deposits of UGX:2.3 trillion (approx. US$597 million) and a loan book of UGX: 1.5 trillion (approx. US$389.3 million).

At that time, its share of customer deposits was estimated at 8 percent of national banking deposits. This made EBUL the fastest growing commercial bank in the country, having increased its market share of bank deposits in the country, from 1.75 percent in 2011. As of 2021, EBUL was the 6th largest bank in Uganda, compared to the 15th position it was in 2011.

== History ==
Equity Bank Uganda Limited was created in 2008 when the Equity Group Holdings Limited purchased Uganda Microfinance Limited, a Tier II, Ugandan microfinance company for an all-share price of US$27 million. Equity Bank (Uganda) launched under its new brand on 30 March 2009.

== Ownership ==
Equity Bank Uganda Limited is a subsidiary of Equity Group Holdings Limited (EGHL). The Ugandan subsidiary owns 11,333,333 ordinary shares of the parent company based in Nairobi, Kenya. EGHL is a large Kenyan financial services conglomerate, with total assets of over Kshs 1.12 trillion (US$10.4 billion), as at July 2021. The stock of EGHL is also cross-listed on the Uganda Securities Exchange under the symbol EBL.

Equity Bank Uganda Limited stock ownership
Rank	Name of owner	Percentage ownership
1	Equity Group Holdings Limited	98.8
2	Others	1.2
	Total	100.00

== Branch network ==
Equity Bank Uganda Limited has its headquarters in Uganda's capital city, Kampala. As of July 2021, the bank maintained networked branches at the following locations:

Equity Uganda branch network in 2021
No	Location	Number
1	Kampala	21
2	Branches outside Kampala	22
	Total	43

As of the opening of the branch in the town of Ntungamo in April 2023, the bank has 50 brick-and-mortar branches in the country.

== See also ==
- List of banks in Uganda
- Banking in Uganda
