= Equity Group =

Financial services holding company based in the African Great Lakes region

Equity Group Holdings Limited
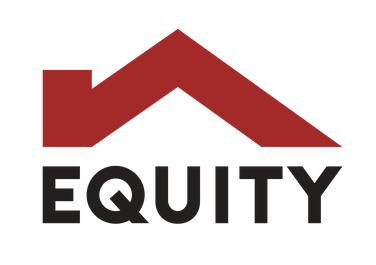

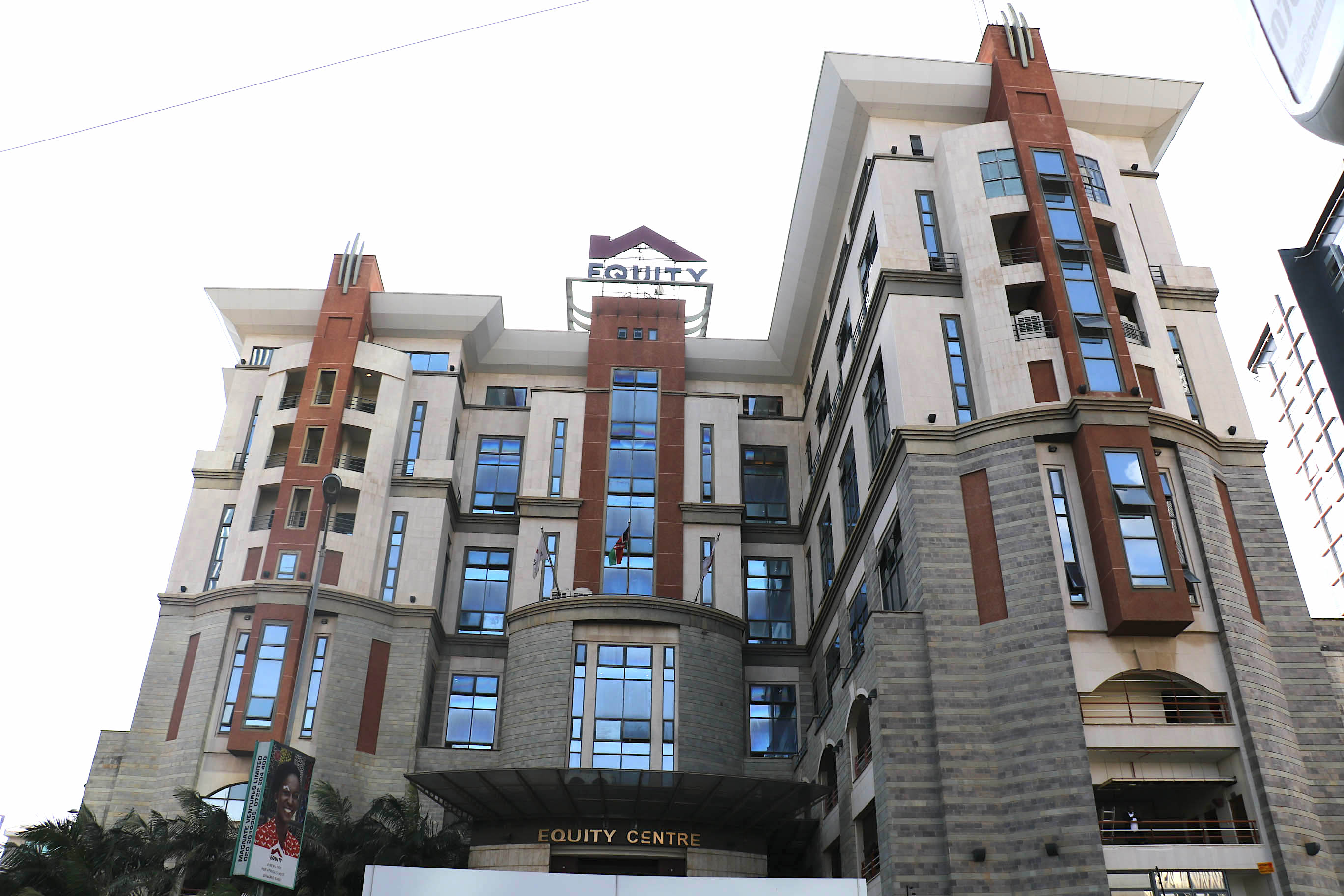
- Equity Group headquarters in Upperhill, Nairobi, Kenya
- Type: Public company
- Traded as: KN: EQTY; USE: EBL
- Industry: Banking and finance
- Predecessor: Equity Building Society
- Founded: 1984
- Headquarters: 9th Floor, Equity Centre; Hospital Road, Upper Hill; Nairobi, Kenya
- Number of locations: 410 branch banks (2026)
- Key people: Isaac Macharia (chairman); James Mwangi (Group CEO); Samwel Kirubi (Group executive director)
- Products: Loans, mortgages, investments, debit cards, credit cards, health, insurance
- Revenue: ▲KSh 57.8 billion (HY 2026)
- Total assets: KSh2.16 trillion (approx. US$17 billion) (HY 2026)
- Number of employees: 14,265 (2026)
- Rating: Long term-rating scale: AA-(KE), short-term rating scale: A1(KE), rating outlook: stable - July 2021
- Website: equitygroupholdings.com

Equity Group Holdings Limited (EGHL), formerly Equity Bank Group, is a financial services holding company based in the African Great Lakes region. EGHL's headquarters are in Nairobi, Kenya, with subsidiaries in Kenya, Uganda, Tanzania, South Sudan, Rwanda, Democratic Republic of the Congo and a representative office in Ethiopia.

EGHL is the largest financial services conglomerate in East and Central Africa. As of September 2026, it had assets exceeding KSh 2.16 trillion (US$17 billion). The group has over 23.3 million customers in seven African Great Lakes countries, with KSh1.59 trillion (Approx. US$12.3 billion) in deposits.

== History ==
=== Foundation and early years ===
EGHL was founded in Kenya as the Equity Building Society (EBS) in October 1984. EBS was originally a provider of mortgage financing for customers in the low-income population. Due to its rural banking orientation, the promotion of agribusiness became a significant and strategic intervention by the bank. By September 2015, Equity Bank had more than 9.2 million customers. The Banker listed Equity Bank among the Top 1,000 Banks in the World with the highest return on assets in the African continent, generating a rate of 6.84 percent on assets deployed.

=== Corporate restructuring ===
Prior to November 2014, Equity Bank was both a licensed bank and a holding company for its subsidiaries. On 31 October 2014, Equity Bank Group announced its intention to incorporate a new wholly owned subsidiary, Equity Bank Kenya Limited, to which it would transfer its Kenyan banking business, assets and liabilities. The rationale for the re-organization was that by converting Equity Bank into a non-trading holding company that owns both banking and non-banking subsidiary companies and provides strategic, brand, risk and talent management to its subsidiaries, the Group would be better placed to invest in and develop existing and new businesses as part of its third phase of growth and transformation. These resolutions were adopted during an extraordinary shareholders general meeting held on 24 November 2014, leading to the formation of Equity Bank Kenya Limited.

=== Regional expansion ===
In September 2015, the group completed its acquisition of 79 percent of DR Congo-based ProCredit Bank Congo SARL from Procredit Group. This acquisition marked the group's entry into sub-Saharan Africa's third most populous country.

In September 2019, Equity Bank Group began talks to acquire a controlling stake in Banque Commerciale du Congo (BCDC), the second-largest commercial bank in the Democratic Republic of the Congo. In August 2020, Equity Group Holdings paid US$95 million (approximately KES 10.2 billion) for a 66.5 percent ownership in BCDC.

On 30 December 2020, Equity Group Holdings received regulatory approval from the DRC government to merge Equity Bank Congo (EBC) and the Banque Commerciale du Congo (BCDC) into Equity BCDC. In November 2023, Equity BCDC reported a profit before taxation of KSh11.4 billion ($74 million) for the nine months ending September, making it the most profitable subsidiary of the group. This successful acquisition enabled EGHL to surpass the KSh 1 trillion balance sheet mark, making it the first bank in East and Central Africa to achieve that milestone.

=== Rwanda expansion ===
On 14 June 2023, EGH publicly disclosed its entry into a binding term sheet for the acquisition of 91.93% of COGEBANQUE's issued shares from the Government of Rwanda, Rwanda Social Security Board, Sanlam Vie Plc, and Ms. Judith Mugirasoni.

On 3 January 2024, Equity Group Holdings PLC announced the merger of Cogebanque and Equity Bank Rwanda. The amalgamation, which followed the receipt of all corporate and regulatory approvals, marked a significant milestone in the ongoing strategic growth initiatives of EGH.

=== Rebranding and milestones ===
In October 2019, the Group rebranded to Equity, eliminating the entity names the various subsidiaries previously carried such as Group, Bank, Insurance, or Investment Bank, thereby unifying the various brands according to the group MD and CEO, James Mwangi. This rebranding occurred as the Group commemorated its 35th anniversary.

In August 2021, EGHL became the second most capitalized corporate entity at the Nairobi Securities Exchange after reaching the KSh 200 billion market capitalization mark.

== Ownership ==
The stock of Equity Group Holdings Limited is traded on the Nairobi Securities Exchange, under the symbol: EQTY. On Thursday 18 June 2009, the Group's stock cross-listed on the Uganda Securities Exchange and started trading that day, under the symbol: EBL. As of March 2023, shareholding in the group's stock was as depicted in the table below;

Equity Group Holdings Limited stock ownership
| Rank | Name of owner | Percentage ownership |
|---|---|---|
| 1. | Arise BV of Norway and Netherlands | 12.76 |
| 2. | Standard Chartered Nominees Non Resd A/C Ke11752 | 4.35 |
| 3 | Stanbic Nominees LTD A/C NR3530153 | 3.98 |
| 4 | James Njuguna Mwangi | 3.38 |
| 5. | Equity Bank Employees' Share Ownership Plan | 3.08 |
| 6. | Standard Chartered Kenya Nominees Ltd A/C KE004667 | 2.89 |
| 7. | Fortress Highlands Limited | 2.67 |
| 8. | Aib Nominee A/C Solidus Holdings Ltd | 2.38 |
| 9. | Standard Chartered Kenya Nominees Ltd A/C KE005073 | 2.34 |
| 10. | Standard Chartered Kenya Nominees Ltd A/C KE002596 | 1.95 |
| 11. | Other shareholders | 60.15 |
| | Total | 100.00 |

== Member companies ==
The companies that compose the Equity Group Holdings Limited include but are not limited to the following:

1. Equity Bank Kenya Limited – Nairobi, Kenya – 100% shareholding – A commercial bank in Kenya, serving individuals and businesses.
2. Equity Bank Rwanda Limited – Kigali, Rwanda – 100% shareholding – A commercial bank in Rwanda, serving both individuals and businesses.
3. Equity Bank South Sudan Limited – Juba, South Sudan – 100% shareholding – A commercial bank in South Sudan.
4. Equity Bank Tanzania Limited – Dar es Salaam, Tanzania – 100% shareholding – A commercial bank in Tanzania.
5. Equity Bank Uganda Limited – Kampala, Uganda – 100% shareholding – A commercial bank in Uganda.
6. Equity BCDC – Kinshasa, Democratic Republic of the Congo: 77.5 percent shareholding – A commercial bank in DR Congo.
7. Equity Consulting Group Limited – Nairobi, Kenya
8. Equity Insurance Agency Limited – Nairobi, Kenya – 100% shareholding – The insurance agency arm of the group. Offering bancassurance services to customers
9. Equity Nominees Limited – Nairobi, Kenya – 100% shareholding – A Nominee company. Holding investments on behalf of customers.
10. Equity Investment Bank Limited – Nairobi, Kenya – 100% shareholding – An investment bank in Kenya. A member of the Nairobi Securities Exchange and licensed by the Capital Markets Authority.
11. Finserve Africa Limited – Nairobi, Kenya – 100% shareholding – A mobile virtual network operator (MVNO) in Kenya.
12. Equity Group Foundation – Nairobi, Kenya – 100% shareholding – The philanthropy and corporate social responsibility arm of the group.
13. Azenia - Nairobi, Kenya—100% shareholding – A technological affiliate for developing digital solutions to the group.

=== Equity Group Foundation ===
Equity Group Foundation
- Abbreviation: EGF
- Formation: January 1, 2006; 20 years ago
- Type: Nonprofit
- Legal status: Foundation
- Headquarters: Upper Hill, Nairobi, Kenya
- Region served: Africa
- Fields: List: Education & Leadership Development; Agriculture; Health; Entrepreneurship & Financial Education; Energy & Environment; Social Protection
- Executive Chairman: James Mwangi
- Key people: Joanne Korir (Director of Operations)
- Parent organization: Equity Group Holdings
- Website: equitygroupfoundation.com

Equity Group Foundation (EGF) is an East African foundation based in Nairobi, Kenya. It was founded in 2006 to bolster corporate social responsibility (CSR) for Equity Group Holdings. EGF's programmes have also been covered through partnerships with institutions including UNDP and the European Union.

The main aim of Equity Group Foundation is to enhance the social and economic prosperity of people in the African region. This is through creating opportunities for people living at the bottom of the pyramid thus incorporating them into the modern economy. Since its inception in 2006, the Foundation has significantly enhanced the coordination of corporate social responsibility (CSR) interventions for Equity Group Holdings Limited. Through their Wings to Fly Program, Equity Group Foundation was able to award 2,000 students with extended high school scholarships in the year 2015. This program is co-funded by the MasterCard Foundation for US$41 million over a nine year period.

The Harvard Business Review described the Foundation as being focused on driving African development and creating opportunities for prosperity.

The Foundation has seven major programme pillars. These are:

- Education and Leadership:
  - Administers educational access and leadership-development programmes, including Wings to Fly, the Elimu Scholarship Programme and the Equity Leaders Program.
  - Supports secondary-school scholarships, mentorship, career guidance and transition to tertiary education.
  - Through the Equity Leaders Program, scholars receive leadership training, internship placements and support in securing admission to universities in Africa, Europe and North America.
  - In 2026, the European Union and Equity Group Foundation entered into a partnership aimed at creating pathways for top-performing scholars to pursue postgraduate education in Europe.
- Enterprise Development and Financial Inclusion:
  - Operates programmes focused on entrepreneurship, financial literacy, business management and access to finance for micro, small and medium-sized enterprises (MSMEs).
  - Works with development-finance institutions and private-sector partners to support enterprise growth and job creation.
  - Emphasises entrepreneurship training, business mentorship and financial inclusion as tools for economic participation and income generation.
- Food and Agriculture:
  - Supports farmers through training, agribusiness development, financial literacy and market-access initiatives.
  - Works with agricultural value chains to improve productivity, resilience and commercialisation among smallholder farmers.
  - Promotes climate-smart agriculture and sustainable farming practices through technical assistance and partnerships with public and private institutions.
- Energy and Environment:
  - Implements programmes aimed at increasing access to clean energy solutions and promoting environmental sustainability.
  - Supports adoption of clean cooking technologies, renewable-energy financing and environmentally sustainable business practices.
  - Participates in initiatives linked to climate resilience, decarbonisation and the transition to low-carbon economic activity.
- Health:
  - Oversees healthcare interventions through the Equity Afya network, a physician-led chain of outpatient medical centres operating in Kenya and the Democratic Republic of the Congo.
  - Focuses on expanding access to primary healthcare, preventive care, diagnostics and specialist outpatient services.
  - The Equity Afya model has been cited as part of broader efforts to address healthcare access gaps and increase community-level healthcare delivery in East Africa.
- Innovation and Entrepreneurship:
  - Supports innovation and entrepreneurship through incubation, mentorship and ecosystem-building initiatives targeting young innovators and start-up enterprises.
  - In partnership with UNDP under the timbuktoo initiative, supports programmes designed to improve access to capital, mentorship and innovation ecosystems for African entrepreneurs.
  - Activities focus on technology-enabled enterprises, youth entrepreneurship and business innovation across priority economic sectors.
- Social Protection:
  - Implements social-protection initiatives aimed at supporting vulnerable households, refugees, women, youth and other underserved populations.
  - Supports livelihoods, economic inclusion and resilience-building interventions during periods of economic hardship and humanitarian need.
  - Works with government agencies, development partners and civil-society organisations to expand access to economic opportunity and community support services.

The Equity Group Foundation worked with governments, development agencies, educational institutions and private-sector organizations.

- United Nations Development Programme: EGF partnered with UNDP in January 2024 through the Timbuktoo initiative, a pan-African programme intended to mobilise investment for start-ups and sector-specific innovation hubs. UNDP has identified Equity Group among the private-sector organisations participating in initiatives associated with the programme. In November 2025, the two organizations announced a memorandum of understanding covering entrepreneurship, value-chain development, education, financial inclusion, gender equality and climate action.
- European Union education pathways: On 11 June 2026, the European Union Delegation to Kenya announced a partnership with EGF to increase awareness of European study opportunities among Equity Leaders Program scholars and develop pathways to European universities. The partnership linked the Erasmus+ education framework with local universities..
- Other partnerships include the MasterCard Foundation, Department for International Development (DFID), United States Agency for International Development (USAID), KfW Development Bank, Financial Sector Deepening (FSD Kenya), Kenyatta University and Africa Nazarene University.

== See also ==
- British-American Investments Company
